= 1964 European Nations' Cup squads =

These are the squads for the 1964 European Nations' Cup in Spain, which took place from 17 to 21 June 1964. The players' listed ages are their ages on the tournament's opening day (17 June 1964).

== Denmark ==
Manager: Poul Petersen

No.	Pos.	Player	Date of birth (age)	Caps	Club
	GK	Leif Nielsen	28 May 1942 (aged 22)	0	(Denmark) Frem
	GK	Svend Aage Rask	14 July 1935 (aged 28)	0	(Denmark) B 1909
	DF	John Amdisen	8 July 1934 (aged 29)	9	(Denmark) Aarhus GF
	DF	Bent Hansen	13 September 1933 (aged 30)	44	(Denmark) B 1903
	DF	Jens Jørgen Hansen	4 January 1939 (aged 25)	13	(Denmark) Esbjerg fB
	DF	Kaj Hansen	16 August 1940 (aged 23)	1	(Denmark) Frem
	DF	Birger Larsen	27 March 1942 (aged 22)	2	(Denmark) Frem
	DF	Bent Wolmar	8 August 1937 (aged 26)	0	(Denmark) Aarhus GF
	MF	Carl Bertelsen	15 November 1937 (aged 26)	18	(Denmark) Esbjerg fB
	MF	Helge Jørgensen	17 September 1937 (aged 26)	6	(Denmark) Odense KFUM
	MF	Erling Nielsen	2 January 1935 (aged 29)	1	(Denmark) B 1909
	MF	Ole Sørensen	25 November 1937 (aged 26)	14	(Denmark) KB
	FW	John Danielsen	13 July 1939 (aged 24)	24	(Denmark) B 1909
	FW	Ole Madsen (captain)	21 December 1934 (aged 29)	31	(Denmark) HIK
	FW	Jørgen Rasmussen	19 February 1937 (aged 27)	0	(Denmark) B 1913
	FW	Tom Søndergaard	2 January 1944 (aged 20)	0	(Denmark) B 93
	FW	Kjeld Thorst	13 May 1940 (aged 24)	7	(Denmark) AaB

== Hungary ==
Manager: Lajos Baróti

No.	Pos.	Player	Date of birth (age)	Caps	Club
	GK	József Gelei	29 June 1938 (aged 25)	0	(Hungary) Tatabányai Bányász
	GK	Antal Szentmihályi	13 June 1939 (aged 25)	16	(Hungary) Vasas SC
	DF	Kálmán Ihász	6 March 1941 (aged 23)	4	(Hungary) Vasas SC
	DF	Sándor Mátrai	20 November 1932 (aged 31)	60	(Hungary) Ferencvárosi TC
	DF	Kálmán Mészöly	16 July 1941 (aged 22)	26	(Hungary) Vasas SC
	DF	Dezső Novák	3 February 1939 (aged 25)	5	(Hungary) Ferencvárosi TC
	DF	László Sárosi	27 February 1932 (aged 32)	41	(Hungary) Vasas SC
	MF	Imre Komora	5 June 1940 (aged 24)	0	(Hungary) Budapesti Honvéd
	MF	István Nagy	14 April 1939 (aged 25)	12	(Hungary) MTK FC
	MF	Gyula Rákosi	9 October 1938 (aged 25)	19	(Hungary) Ferencvárosi TC
	MF	Ferenc Sipos	13 December 1932 (aged 31)	60	(Hungary) MTK FC
	MF	Ernő Solymosi	21 June 1940 (aged 23)	31	(Hungary) Újpesti Dozsa
	FW	Flórián Albert	15 September 1941 (aged 22)	40	(Hungary) Ferencvárosi TC
	FW	Ferenc Bene	17 December 1944 (aged 19)	6	(Hungary) Újpesti Dózsa
	FW	János Farkas	27 March 1942 (aged 22)	5	(Hungary) Vasas SC
	FW	Máté Fenyvesi	20 September 1933 (aged 30)	63	(Hungary) Ferencvárosi TC
	FW	Lajos Tichy (captain)	21 March 1935 (aged 29)	70	(Hungary) Budapesti Honvéd
	FW	Zoltán Varga	1 January 1945 (aged 19)	0	(Hungary) Ferencvárosi TC

== Soviet Union ==
Manager: Konstantin Beskov

No.	Pos.	Player	Date of birth (age)	Caps	Club
	GK	Ramaz Urushadze	17 August 1939 (aged 24)	1	(Soviet Union) Torpedo Kutaisi
	GK	Lev Yashin	22 October 1929 (aged 34)	50	(Soviet Union) Dynamo Moscow
	DF	Viktor Anichkin	8 December 1941 (aged 22)	1	(Soviet Union) Dynamo Moscow
	DF	Vladimir Glotov	23 January 1937 (aged 27)	1	(Soviet Union) Dynamo Moscow
	DF	Eduard Mudrik	18 July 1939 (aged 24)	2	(Soviet Union) Dynamo Moscow
	DF	Albert Shesternyov	20 June 1941 (aged 22)	5	(Soviet Union) CSKA Moscow
	DF	Viktor Shustikov	28 January 1939 (aged 25)	2	(Soviet Union) Torpedo Moscow
	MF	Alexey Korneyev	6 February 1939 (aged 25)	0	(Soviet Union) Spartak Moscow
	MF	Yuri Shikunov	8 December 1939 (aged 24)	0	(Soviet Union) SKA Rostov
	MF	Valery Voronin	17 July 1939 (aged 24)	22	(Soviet Union) Torpedo Moscow
	FW	Igor Chislenko	4 January 1939 (aged 25)	13	(Soviet Union) Dynamo Moscow
	FW	Gennadi Gusarov	11 March 1937 (aged 27)	7	(Soviet Union) Dynamo Moscow
	FW	Valentin Ivanov (captain)	19 November 1934 (aged 29)	48	(Soviet Union) Torpedo Moscow
	FW	Galimzyan Khusainov	27 June 1937 (aged 26)	8	(Soviet Union) Spartak Moscow
	FW	Oleg Kopayev	28 November 1937 (aged 26)	0	(Soviet Union) SKA Rostov
	FW	Eduard Malofeyev	2 June 1942 (aged 22)	2	(Soviet Union) Dinamo Minsk
	FW	Viktor Ponedelnik	22 May 1937 (aged 27)	21	(Soviet Union) SKA Rostov
	FW	Kazbek Tuaev	13 November 1940 (aged 23)	0	(Soviet Union) Neftjanik Baku

== Spain ==
Manager: José Villalonga

No.	Pos.	Player	Date of birth (age)	Caps	Club
	GK	José Ángel Iribar	1 March 1943 (aged 21)	2	(Spain) Athletic Bilbao
	GK	Salvador Sadurní	3 April 1941 (aged 23)	1	(Spain) Barcelona
	DF	Isacio Calleja	6 December 1936 (aged 27)	10	(Spain) Atlético Madrid
	DF	Gallego	4 March 1944 (aged 20)	0	(Spain) Sevilla
	DF	Ferran Olivella (captain)	22 June 1936 (aged 27)	10	(Spain) Barcelona
	DF	Severino Reija	25 November 1938 (aged 25)	5	(Spain) Zaragoza
	DF	Feliciano Rivilla	21 August 1936 (aged 27)	19	(Spain) Atlético Madrid
	MF	Luis del Sol	6 April 1935 (aged 29)	13	(Italy) Juventus
	MF	Josep Maria Fusté	15 April 1941 (aged 23)	2	(Spain) Barcelona
	MF	Paquito	14 February 1938 (aged 26)	5	(Spain) Valencia
	MF	Chus Pereda	15 June 1938 (aged 26)	9	(Spain) Barcelona
	MF	Ignacio Zoco	31 July 1939 (aged 24)	10	(Spain) Real Madrid
	FW	Amancio	16 October 1939 (aged 24)	5	(Spain) Real Madrid
	FW	Carlos Lapetra	29 November 1938 (aged 25)	3	(Spain) Zaragoza
	FW	Marcelino	29 April 1940 (aged 24)	3	(Spain) Zaragoza
	FW	Luis Suárez	2 May 1935 (aged 29)	25	(Italy) Internazionale
