= 1964 European Nations' Cup final tournament =

The final tournament of the 1964 European Nations' Cup was a single-elimination tournament involving the four teams that qualified from the quarter-finals. There were two rounds of matches: a semi-final stage leading to the final to decide the champions. The final tournament began with the semi-finals on 17 June and ended with the final on 21 June at the Santiago Bernabéu in Madrid. Spain won the tournament with a 2–1 victory over the Soviet Union.

All times Central European Time (UTC+1)

== Format ==
Any game in the final tournament that was undecided by the end of the regular 90 minutes was followed by thirty minutes of extra time (two 15-minute halves). If scores were still level, a coin toss would be used in all matches but the final. If the final finished level after extra time, a replay would take place at a later date to decide the winner.

== Teams ==
Team	Method of qualification	Date of qualification	Finals appearance	Last appearance	Previous best performance
Denmark	Quarter-final winner	18 December 1963	1st	—	Debut
Hungary	Quarter-final winner	23 May 1964	1st	—	Debut
Soviet Union	Quarter-final winner	27 May 1964	2nd	1960	Winners (1960)
Spain (host)	Quarter-final winner	8 April 1964	1st	—	Debut

== Bracket ==
Semi-finals
17 June – Madrid
Spain (a.e.t.)	2
Hungary	1
17 June – Barcelona
Denmark	0
Soviet Union	3

Final
21 June – Madrid
Spain	2
Soviet Union	1
Third place play-off
20 June – Barcelona
Hungary (a.e.t.)	3
Denmark	1

== Semi-finals ==
=== Spain vs Hungary ===
17 June 1964
20:00

Spain	2–1 (a.e.t.)	Hungary
Pereda 35'; Amancio 112'	Report	Bene 84'

Santiago Bernabéu, Madrid
Attendance: 34,713
Referee: Arthur Blavier (Belgium)

Spain	Hungary

GK	1	José Ángel Iribar
RB	2	Feliciano Rivilla
LB	3	Ferran Olivella (c)
RH	4	Isacio Calleja
CH	5	Ignacio Zoco
LH	6	Josep Maria Fusté
OR	7	Amancio
IR	8	Chus Pereda
CF	9	Marcelino Martínez
IL	10	Luis Suárez
OL	11	Carlos Lapetra
Manager:
José Villalonga

GK	1	Antal Szentmihályi
RB	2	Sándor Mátrai
LB	4	László Sárosi
RH	3	Kálmán Mészöly
CH	5	István Nagy
LH	6	Ferenc Sipos
OR	7	Ferenc Bene
IR	8	Imre Komora
CF	9	Flórián Albert
IL	10	Lajos Tichy (c)
OL	11	Máté Fenyvesi
Manager:
Lajos Baróti

=== Denmark vs Soviet Union ===
17 June 1964
22:30

Denmark	0–3	Soviet Union
	Report	Voronin 19'; Ponedelnik 40'; Ivanov 87'

Camp Nou, Barcelona
Attendance: 38,556
Referee: Concetto Lo Bello (Italy)

Denmark	Soviet Union

GK	1	Leif Nielsen
RB	2	Jens Jørgen Hansen
LB	3	Kaj Hansen
RH	4	Bent Hansen
CH	5	Birger Larsen
LH	6	Erling Nielsen
OR	7	Carl Bertelsen
IR	8	Ole Sørensen
CF	9	Ole Madsen (c)
IL	10	Kjeld Thorst
OL	11	John Danielsen
Manager:
Poul Petersen

GK	1	Lev Yashin
RB	2	Viktor Shustikov
CB	3	Albert Shesternyov
CB	4	Eduard Mudrik
LB	6	Viktor Anichkin
CM	5	Valery Voronin
CM	10	Gennadi Gusarov
RW	7	Igor Chislenko
LW	11	Galimzyan Khusainov
CF	9	Viktor Ponedelnik
CF	8	Valentin Ivanov (c)
Manager:
Konstantin Beskov

== Third place play-off ==
20 June 1964
20:30

Hungary	3–1 (a.e.t.)	Denmark
Bene 11'; Novák 107' (pen.), 110'	Report	Bertelsen 82'

Camp Nou, Barcelona
Attendance: 3,869
Referee: Daniel Mellet (Switzerland)

Hungary	Denmark

GK	1	Antal Szentmihályi
RB	2	Dezső Novák
LB	3	Kálmán Mészöly
RH	4	Kálmán Ihász
CH	5	Ernő Solymosi
LH	6	Ferenc Sipos (c)
OR	7	János Farkas
IR	8	Zoltán Varga
CF	10	Ferenc Bene
IL	9	Flórián Albert
OL	11	Máté Fenyvesi
Manager:
Lajos Baróti

GK	1	Leif Nielsen
RB	2	Bent Wolmar
LB	3	Kaj Hansen
RH	4	Bent Hansen
CH	5	Birger Larsen
LH	6	Erling Nielsen
OR	7	Carl Bertelsen
IR	8	Ole Sørensen
CF	9	Ole Madsen (c)
IL	10	Kjeld Thorst
OL	11	John Danielsen
Manager:
Poul Petersen

== Final ==
21 June 1964
18:30

Spain	2–1	Soviet Union
Pereda 6'; Marcelino 84'	Report, lineups	Khusainov 8'

Santiago Bernabéu, Madrid
Attendance: 79,115
Referee: Arthur Holland (England)

Spain	Soviet Union

GK	1	José Ángel Iribar
RB	2	Feliciano Rivilla
CB	5	Ferran Olivella (c)
LB	3	Isacio Calleja
RH	4	Ignacio Zoco
LH	6	Josep Maria Fusté
OR	11	Carlos Lapetra
IR	10	Luis Suárez
CF	9	Marcelino Martínez
IL	8	Chus Pereda
OL	7	Amancio
Manager:
José Villalonga

GK	1	Lev Yashin
RB	6	Viktor Anichkin
CB	2	Viktor Shustikov
CB	3	Albert Shesternyov
LB	4	Eduard Mudrik
CM	5	Valery Voronin
CM	10	Alexey Korneyev
RW	7	Igor Chislenko
LW	11	Galimzyan Khusainov
CF	8	Valentin Ivanov (c)
CF	9	Viktor Ponedelnik
Manager:
Konstantin Beskov

== See also ==
- Denmark at the UEFA European Championship
- Hungary at the UEFA European Championship
- Soviet Union at the UEFA European Championship
- Spain at the UEFA European Championship
