= 1964 European Nations' Cup final =

International football match

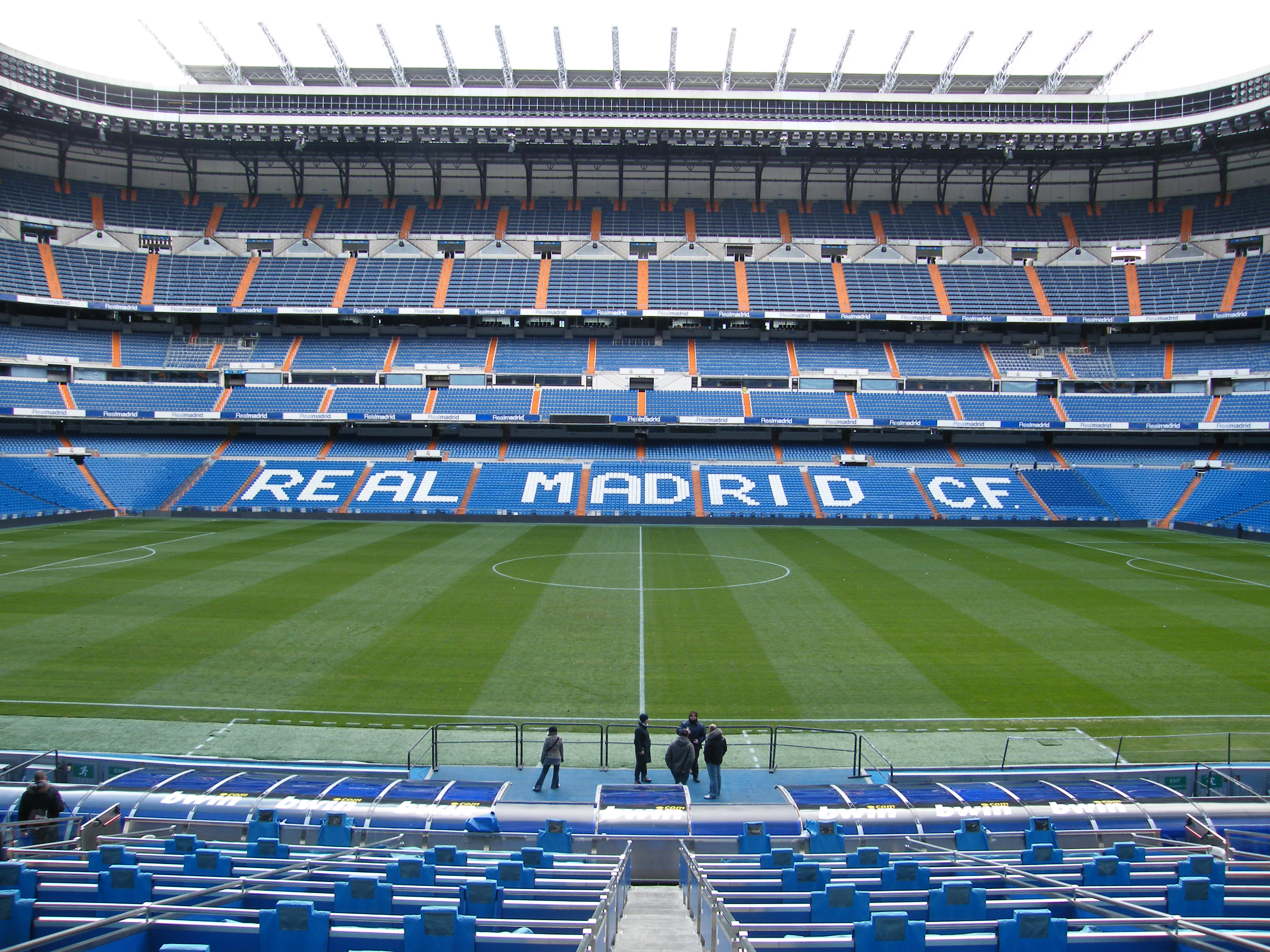
- The Santiago Bernabéu (pictured in 2009) held the final.
- Event: 1964 European Nations' Cup
Spain	Soviet Union
2	1
- Date: 21 June 1964
- Venue: Santiago Bernabéu, Madrid
- Referee: Arthur Holland (England)
- Attendance: 79,115

The 1964 European Nations' Cup final was a football match played at the Santiago Bernabéu Stadium in Madrid, Spain, on 21 June 1964, to determine the winners of the 1964 European Nations' Cup. It was the second final of what has since been known as the European Championship, UEFA's quadrennial football competition for national teams. The match was contested between Spain and the Soviet Union, the previous tournament winners.

En route to the final, Spain defeated Romania, Northern Ireland, and the Republic of Ireland over two-legged ties, before beating Hungary in the semi-finals. The Soviet Union received a bye in the qualifying round, before beating Italy, Sweden, and Denmark en route to the final.

The referee for the final, played in front of an attendance of 79,115 spectators, was Arthur Holland from England. Spain won the match 2–1 to earn their first European Championship title.

== Background ==
The 1964 European Nations' Cup was the second edition of what is now called the UEFA European Football Championship, UEFA's quadrennial football competition for national teams. Qualifying rounds were played on a home-and-away basis between November 1962 and May 1964. The semi-finals and final took place in Spain between 17 and 21 June 1964. A third-place play-off match took place the day before the final, in which Hungary defeated Denmark 3–1 after extra time.

The Soviet Union had won the inaugural final four years prior, defeating Yugoslavia 2–1 after extra time. Spain had refused to play against the Soviet Union in the quarter-final and withdrew from the 1960 tournament, allowing their opponents a walkover. In the 1962 FIFA World Cup, Spain had failed to progress beyond the group stage, losing to both Czechoslovakia and Brazil. The Soviet Union went out of the competition at the quarter-final stage after suffering a 2–1 defeat by Chile. The 1964 European Nations' Cup Final was the first match played between the Soviet Union and Spain.

Spain's manager was José Villalonga Llorente, who had been in charge at Real Madrid and Atlético Madrid before taking the national position in 1962. His opposite number for the Soviet Union was Konstantin Beskov, who had played in the 1940s and 1950s for Dynamo Moscow before moving into club management. He was appointed national manager in 1963.

== Road to the final ==
=== Spain ===
Spain's route to the final
Round	Opposition	Score
Preliminary round	Romania	6–0 (H), 1–3 (A)
Round of 16	Northern Ireland	1–1 (H), 1–0 (A)
Quarter-final	Republic of Ireland	5–1 (H), 2–0 (A)
Semi-final	Hungary	2–1 (a.e.t.) (N)

Spain started their 1964 European Nations' Cup campaign in the preliminary round in which they faced Romania in a two-legged tie. The first match was held at the Santiago Bernabéu Stadium in Madrid on 1 November 1962 and was the first competitive fixture between Spain and Romania. In front of 51,608 supporters, Spain were 4–0 ahead inside the first twenty minutes of the match, with two goals from Vicente Guillot and one each from José Luis Veloso and Enrique Collar. Guillot completed his hat-trick with 20 minutes of the match remaining before an own goal from Ion Nunweiller sealed a 6–0 victory for Spain. The second leg was played later that month at the Stadionul 23 August in Bucharest, in front of 72,762 spectators. The home side took an early 2–0 with goals from Nicolae Tătaru and Cicerone Manolache within the opening eight minutes. Gheorghe Constantin made it 3–0 midway through the second half before Veloso scored for Spain. Despite Romania winning the match 3–1, Spain progressed to the round of 16 with a 7–3 aggregate victory. They faced Northern Ireland, the first leg taking place at the San Mamés Stadium in Bilbao on 30 May 1963 in what author Daniel O'Brien describes as "one of the great forgotten performances in Northern Ireland's history". The Northern Ireland goalkeeper, Bobby Irvine, twice denied Amancio Amaro before Amaro opened the scoring on the hour-mark after an error from Alex Elder. Willie Irvine levelled the score with less than a quarter of an hour remaining and then missed an open goal minutes later, shooting over the Spain crossbar. The return leg was played at Windsor Park in front of 45,809 spectators on 30 October 1963. The first half ended goalless and with twenty minutes of the second half remaining, Spain took the lead. A long-range strike from Paco Gento gave them a 1–0 victory in the match and a 2–1 aggregate win.

Spain's opponents for the quarter-final were the Republic of Ireland with the first leg being held at the Ramón Sánchez Pizjuán Stadium in Seville on 11 March 1964. The Republic of Ireland's team selection was compromised when Manchester United refused to allow Noel Cantwell and Tony Dunne leave to play, and with Charlie Hurley playing his third game in five days. In rainy conditions, Amancio capitalised on a mistake from Hurley to give Spain a 12th-minute lead. Josep Maria Fusté doubled his side's lead two minutes later with a 25 yards (23 m) strike. Andy McEvoy reduced the deficit for the Republic of Ireland midway through the first half, but Amancio restored the two-goal lead on 30 minutes after he scored from Marcelino's cross. Three minutes later, Marcelino himself scored from close range, and after McEvoy was withdrawn through injury leaving the Republic of Ireland with ten players, Spain dominated the second half. With two minutes remaining, Marcelino scored his side's fifth goal after the ball took a deflection off Hurley, to give Spain a 5–1 first leg victory. Although Cantwell and Dunne were included for the return leg at Dalymount Park in Dublin, it made no difference. Spain dominated possession and though Alan Kelly made several saves, debutant Pedro Zaballa scored in both halves: a header from Carlos Lapetra's cross midway through the first half was followed by a strike from 10 yards (9 m) with three minutes of the match remaining. This secured a 2–0 win for Spain, a 7–1 aggregate victory, and qualification for the final tournament which they themselves would host.

Spain's semi-final opposition were Hungary, whom they faced at the Santiago Bernabéu Stadium on 17 June 1964 in front of a crowd of 75,000. For Spain, Luis del Sol, the prominent Juventus winger, was unavailable while Gento was excluded after a disagreement with manager Villalonga. Hungary were without Gyula Rákosi, János Göröcs and Károly Sándor through injury. In the 35th minute, Luis Suárez crossed the ball for Chus Pereda who headed it into the top corner with Hungary's goalkeeper Antal Szentmihályi static, to give the host nation the lead. With six minutes of the match remaining, István Nagy's shot was fumbled by Spain's goalkeeper José Ángel Iribar and Ferenc Bene scored to level the match and send it into extra time. Szentmihályi saved a shot from Amancio before Marcelino headed Lapetra's corner goal-bound and Amancio diverted the ball into the Hungary goal in the 112th minute to give Spain a 2–1 victory and progression to the tournament final.

=== Soviet Union ===
The Soviet Union's route to the final
Round	Opposition	Score
Preliminary round	Bye	—N/a
Round of 16	Italy	2–0 (H), 1–1 (A)
Quarter-final	Sweden	1–1 (A), 3–1 (H)
Semi-final	Denmark	3–0 (N)

The Soviet Union's European Nations' Cup campaign saw them receive a bye in the preliminary round so their first match was their round-of-16 tie against Italy. The match took place at the Central Lenin Stadium in Moscow on 13 October 1963 in front of a crowd of more than 102,000 and was the first competitive between the sides. Midway through the first half, Viktor Ponedelnik gave the Soviet Union the lead, and three minutes before half-time, Igor Chislenko scored to make it 2–0. The second leg was played at the Stadio Olimpico in Rome a month later with an attendance of almost 70,000. Gennadi Gusarov gave the Soviet Union a first-half lead before Lev Yashin saved a penalty from Sandro Mazzola. Gianni Rivera equalised for Italy in the 89th minute, but the match ended 1–1 with the Soviet Union winning 3–1 on aggregate to qualify for the quarter-finals. They faced Sweden with the first leg being played at the Råsunda Stadium in Stockholm on 13 May 1964. After a goalless first half, the dominance of the Soviet Union finally resulted in a goal when Valentin Ivanov scored in the 62nd minute. Failing to capitalise on other chances to score, the Soviet Union conceded the equalising goal with two minutes of the match remaining when Kurt Hamrin struck the ball past Yashin to secure a 1–1 draw. The sides met two weeks later at the Central Lenin Stadium in front of almost 100,000 spectators and Yashin received the 1963 Ballon d'Or award on the pitch before the match. Ponedelnik opened the scoring for the Soviet Union when he ran with the ball before shooting between Arne Arvidsson's legs to make it 1–0 after 32 minutes, before doubling his and his side's tally 11 minutes into the second half with a 25-yard (23 m) strike. Hamrin scored past Yashin in the 78th minute before Valery Voronin shot the ball through Arvidsson's legs following a pass from Ponedelnik. The match ended 3–1 and 4–2 on aggregate to the Soviet Union who progressed to the semi-finals in Spain.

They faced Denmark at the Camp Nou in Barcelona on 17 June 1964 in front of 38,556 spectators. Denmark had enforced an "amateur-only" policy to their side which meant that Erik Sørensen, Kai Johansen and Harald Nielsen were no longer available having signed professional contracts, while Jens Petersen and John Madsen were also otherwise engaged. The Soviet Union dominated the early stages, Voronin opening the scoring midway through the first half from a corner before Ponedelnik beat Leif Nielsen in the Denmark goal with a strike five minutes before half-time. Late in the second half, Ivanov beat three Denmark defenders before scoring his side's third, and the Soviet Union won 3–0 to progress to their second consecutive European Nations' Cup final.

== Match ==
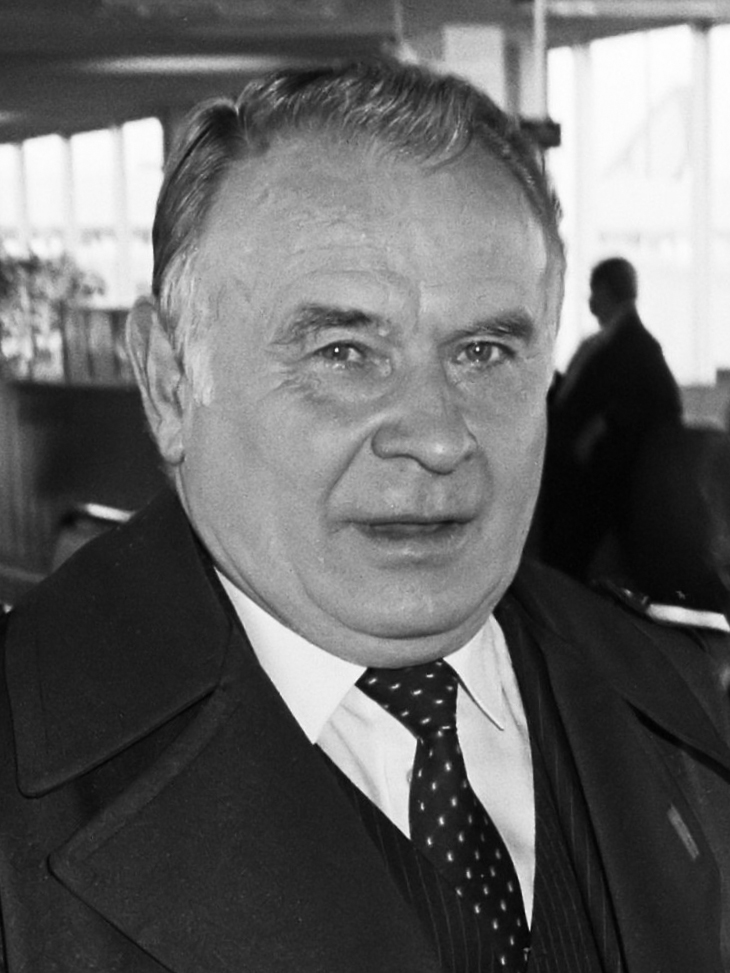
Konstantin Beskov (pictured in 1982) was appointed manager of the Soviet Union team in 1963.

=== Pre-match ===
The referee for the match was Arthur Holland, who became the second Englishman to officiate a European Nations' Cup Final after Arthur Ellis had fulfilled the role in the previous tournament. Before the match, Francisco Franco led future king of Spain Juan Carlos I onto the pitch while Yashin met his childhood hero Ricardo Zamora prior to kick-off. The Soviet Union had won the pre-match coin toss and as such were playing in their usual red-and-white kit while Spain wore dark blue shirts.

=== Summary ===
The final was played at the Santiago Bernabéu Stadium in Madrid on 21 June 1964 in front of 79,115 spectators. Spain's Suárez struck an early free kick over the Spain crossbar before his pass to Marcelino was cut out by Yashin. In the sixth minute, Suárez dispossessed Ivanov, took the ball past Eduard Mudrik and, after making a one-two with Lapetra, crossed for Pereda who scored to give Spain a 1–0 lead. Two minutes later, Viktor Anichkin passed to Galimzyan Khusainov down the left side of the pitch, and his weak shot was mishandled by the Spain goalkeeper Iribar to allow the equaliser. Despite the two early goals, the remainder of the half saw both sides competing in the midfield with several misplaced passes and fouls, although Yashin saved shots from both Pereda and Fusté before Iribar kept Chislenko's attempt out.

In the early stages of the second half, Spain began to dominate but missed several chances to score. Amancio struck the ball into the side netting before he then ran clear of the Soviet Union defence and passed to Marcelino, whose shot was tipped over the Soviet Union crossbar by Yashin. Chislenko then beat three Spain defenders before being brought down by Ignacio Zoco, but the referee allowed play to continue. Voronin then clashed with Suárez who appeared to be injured in the exchange, before the Soviet Union player saw his low shot pushed behind by Iribar. On the hour mark, Iribar saved a shot from Ponedelnik, and twelve minutes later Pereda was brought down by Anichkin. Despite Spain's strong appeals for a penalty, the referee awarded a free-kick on the edge of the Soviet Union penalty area, which came to nothing. With six minutes of the match remaining, Feliciano Rivilla passed to Pereda who first beat Anichkin and then sent in a cross, which Viktor Shustikov was unable to clear, allowing Marcelino a header for the winning goal inside the near post. Spain won the match 2–1 to claim their first European Championship title.

=== Details ===
21 June 1964
18:30 CET

Spain	2–1	Soviet Union
Pereda 6'; Marcelino 84'	Report, lineups	Khusainov 8'

Santiago Bernabéu, Madrid
Attendance: 79,115
Referee: Arthur Holland (England)

Spain	Soviet Union

GK	1	José Ángel Iribar
RB	2	Feliciano Rivilla
CB	5	Ferran Olivella (c)
LB	3	Isacio Calleja
RH	4	Ignacio Zoco
LH	6	Josep Maria Fusté
OR	11	Carlos Lapetra
IR	10	Luis Suárez
CF	9	Marcelino Martínez
IL	8	Chus Pereda
OL	7	Amancio
Manager:
José Villalonga

GK	1	Lev Yashin
RB	6	Viktor Anichkin
CB	2	Viktor Shustikov
CB	3	Albert Shesternyov
LB	4	Eduard Mudrik
CM	5	Valery Voronin
CM	10	Alexey Korneyev
RW	7	Igor Chislenko
LW	11	Galimzyan Khusainov
CF	8	Valentin Ivanov (c)
CF	9	Viktor Ponedelnik
Manager:
Konstantin Beskov

== Post-match ==
All but three of UEFA's team of the tournament had featured in the final, including six Spain and two Soviet Union players. Beskov was dismissed upon his return to Moscow following a meeting with Nikita Khrushchev who had been "incensed" that images of celebrating Franco had been broadcast live in the Soviet Union. Spain's Iribar said "When we won, we were full of joy, we were so into it. Then a few days passed and we realised that if we'd lost, the situation would have been so different. It was a game we had to win at all costs, otherwise there would have been a hunt for culprits. Some players would never have been picked again. We would've gone from heroes to zeros." After the match, Franco received the winning side at the Royal Palace of El Pardo.

The Soviet Union were knocked out in the second qualifying round of the 1964 Summer Olympics by East Germany: a tiebreaker was required after both legs of the match ended 1–1, and East Germany progressed with a 4–1 victory. Spain also failed to qualify for the final tournament in Tokyo, losing 5–1 on aggregate to Hungary.

Villalonga was dismissed from his post two years later after suffering defeats against West Germany and Argentina during Spain's failure to progress past the group stage of the 1966 FIFA World Cup. The Soviet Union beat North Korea, Italy and Chile in their group stage. After defeating Hungary, they lost to West Germany in the semi-final and were defeated by Portugal in the third-place play-off.

== See also ==
- Soviet Union at the UEFA European Championship
- Spain at the UEFA European Championship
