= Hungary at the UEFA European Championship =

International football delegation

As of 2024, Hungary have appeared in five UEFA European Championships. At the 1964 European Nations' Cup, they finished third after winning their play-off against Denmark, and at Euro 1972 they placed fourth.

In the 2016 edition, Hungary finished in the round of 16, after winning the group. This was their best result in nearly four decades. They qualified again for Euro 2020 and were one of the eleven chosen host countries, but were eliminated in the group stage.

== 1964 European Nations' Cup ==
=== Final tournament ===
Semi-finals

17 June 1964
20:00

Spain	2–1 (a.e.t.)	Hungary
Pereda 35'; Amancio 112'	Report	Bene 84'

Santiago Bernabéu, Madrid
Attendance: 34,713
Referee: Arthur Blavier (Belgium)

Third place play-off

20 June 1964
20:30

Hungary	3–1 (a.e.t.)	Denmark
Bene 11'; Novák 107' (pen.), 110'	Report	Bertelsen 82'

Camp Nou, Barcelona
Attendance: 3,869
Referee: Daniel Mellet (Switzerland)

== Euro 1972 ==
=== Final tournament ===
Semi-finals

14 June 1972
20:00

Hungary	0–1	Soviet Union
	Report	Konkov 53'

Stade Émile Versé, Brussels
Attendance: 1,659
Referee: Rudi Glöckner (East Germany)

Third place play-off

17 June 1972
20:00

Hungary	1–2	Belgium
Kű 53' (pen.)	Report	Lambert 24'; Van Himst 28'

Stade Maurice Dufrasne, Liège
Attendance: 6,184
Referee: Johan Einar Boström (Sweden)

== Euro 2016 ==
=== Group stage ===
Pos	Team	Pld	W	D	L	GF	GA	GD	Pts	Qualification
1	Hungary	3	1	2	0	6	4	+2	5 (Note: Tied on head-to-head result (Iceland 1–1 Hungary). Overall goal difference was used as the tiebreaker.)	Advance to knockout stage
2	Iceland	3	1	2	0	4	3	+1	5	Advance to knockout stage
3	Portugal	3	0	3	0	4	4	0	3	Advance to knockout stage
4	Austria	3	0	1	2	1	4	−3	1	

Source: UEFA
Rules for classification: Group stage tiebreakers
Notes:
14 June 2016
18:00

Austria	0–2	Hungary
	Report	Szalai 62'; Stieber 87'

Stade de Bordeaux, Bordeaux
Attendance: 34,424
Referee: Clément Turpin (France)

18 June 2016
18:00

Iceland	1–1	Hungary
G. Sigurðsson 40' (pen.)	Report	Sævarsson 88' (o.g.)

Stade Vélodrome, Marseille
Attendance: 60,842
Referee: Sergei Karasev (Russia)

22 June 2016
18:00

Hungary	3–3	Portugal
Gera 19'; Dzsudzsák 47', 55'	Report	Nani 42'; Ronaldo 50', 62'

Parc Olympique Lyonnais, Décines-Charpieu
Attendance: 55,514
Referee: Martin Atkinson (England)

=== Knockout stage ===
Round of 16

26 June 2016
21:00

Hungary	0–4	Belgium
	Report	Alderweireld 10'; Batshuayi 78'; Hazard 80'; Carrasco 90+1'

Stadium Municipal, Toulouse
Attendance: 28,921
Referee: Milorad Mažić (Serbia)

== Euro 2020 ==
=== Group stage ===
Pos	Team	Pld	W	D	L	GF	GA	GD	Pts	Qualification
1	France	3	1	2	0	4	3	+1	5	Advance to knockout stage
2	Germany (H)	3	1	1	1	6	5	+1	4 (Note: Head-to-head result: Portugal 2–4 Germany.)	Advance to knockout stage
3	Portugal	3	1	1	1	7	6	+1	4	Advance to knockout stage
4	Hungary (H)	3	0	2	1	3	6	−3	2	

Source: UEFA
Rules for classification: Group stage tiebreakers
(H) Hosts
Notes:
15 June 2021
18:00

Hungary	0–3	Portugal
	Report	Guerreiro 84'; Ronaldo 87' (pen.), 90+2'

Puskás Aréna, Budapest
Attendance: 55,662
Referee: Cüneyt Çakır (Turkey)

19 June 2021
15:00

Hungary	1–1	France
Fiola 45+2'	Report	Griezmann 66'

Puskás Aréna, Budapest
Attendance: 55,998
Referee: Michael Oliver (England)

23 June 2021
21:00

Germany	2–2	Hungary
Havertz 66'; Goretzka 84'	Report	Ád. Szalai 11'; Schäfer 68'

Allianz Arena, Munich
Attendance: 12,413
Referee: Sergei Karasev (Russia)

== Euro 2024 ==
=== Group stage ===
Pos	Team	Pld	W	D	L	GF	GA	GD	Pts	Qualification
1	Germany (H)	3	2	1	0	8	2	+6	7	Advance to knockout stage
2	Switzerland	3	1	2	0	5	3	+2	5	Advance to knockout stage
3	Hungary	3	1	0	2	2	5	−3	3	
4	Scotland	3	0	1	2	2	7	−5	1	

Source: UEFA
(H) Hosts
15 June 2024
15:00

Hungary	1–3	Switzerland
Varga 66'	Report	Duah 12'; Aebischer 45'; Embolo 90+3'

RheinEnergieStadion, Cologne
Attendance: 41,676
Referee: Slavko Vinčić (Slovenia)

19 June 2024
18:00

Germany	2–0	Hungary
Musiala 22'; Gündoğan 67'	Report

MHPArena, Stuttgart
Attendance: 54,000
Referee: Danny Makkelie (Netherlands)

23 June 2024
21:00

Scotland	0–1	Hungary
	Report	Csoboth 90+10'

MHPArena, Stuttgart
Attendance: 54,000
Referee: Facundo Tello (Argentina)

Ranking of third-placed teams

Pos	Grp	Team	Pld	W	D	L	GF	GA	GD	Pts	Qualification
1	D	Netherlands	3	1	1	1	4	4	0	4 (Note: Disciplinary points: Netherlands −2, Georgia −6.)	Advance to knockout stage
2	F	Georgia	3	1	1	1	4	4	0	4	Advance to knockout stage
3	E	Slovakia	3	1	1	1	3	3	0	4	Advance to knockout stage
4	C	Slovenia	3	0	3	0	2	2	0	3	Advance to knockout stage
5	A	Hungary	3	1	0	2	2	5	−3	3	
6	B	Croatia	3	0	2	1	3	6	−3	2	

Source: UEFA
Rules for classification: 1) Points; 2) Goal difference; 3) Goals scored; 4) Wins; 5) Lower disciplinary points total; 6) European Qualifiers overall ranking (or drawing of lots, if hosts Germany had been involved in the tiebreaker).

== Overall record ==
Champions Runners-up Third place Fourth place

UEFA European Championship record									Qualification record						
Year	Round	Position	Pld	W	D*	L	GF	GA	Position	Pld	W	D	L	GF	GA
(France) 1960	Did not qualify								FR	2	0	0	2	1	4
(Spain) 1964	Third place	3rd	2	1	0	1	4	3	QF	6	4	2	0	14	8
(Italy) 1968	Did not qualify								QF	8	5	1	2	17	8
(Belgium) 1972	Fourth place	4th	2	0	0	2	1	3	QF	9	5	3	1	17	9
(Socialist Federal Republic of Yugoslavia) 1976	Did not qualify								2nd	6	3	1	2	15	8
(Italy) 1980	Did not qualify								2nd	6	2	2	2	9	9
(France) 1984	Did not qualify								4th	8	3	1	4	18	17
(West Germany) 1988	Did not qualify								3rd	8	4	0	4	13	11
(Sweden) 1992	Did not qualify								4th	8	2	4	2	10	9
(England) 1996	Did not qualify								4th	8	2	2	4	7	13
(Belgium) (Netherlands) 2000	Did not qualify								4th	10	3	3	4	14	10
(Portugal) 2004	Did not qualify								4th	8	3	2	3	15	9
(Austria) (Switzerland) 2008	Did not qualify								6th	12	4	0	8	11	22
(Poland) (Ukraine) 2012	Did not qualify								3rd	10	6	1	3	22	14
(France) 2016	Round of 16	13th	4	1	2	1	6	8	3rd (PO winners)	12	6	4	2	14	10
(Europe) 2020	Group stage	20th	3	0	2	1	3	6	4th (PO winners)	10	6	0	4	13	13
(Germany) 2024	Group stage	18th	3	1	0	2	2	5	1st	8	5	3	0	16	7
(United Kingdom) (Republic of Ireland) 2028	To be determined								To be determined						
(Italy) (Turkey) 2032	To be determined								To be determined						
Total	Third place	5/17	14	3	4	7	16	25	Total	139	63	29	47	226	181

*Denotes draws including knockout matches decided via penalty shoot-out.
**Red border colour indicates that the tournament was held on home soil.

== Head-to-head record ==
Opponent	Pld	W	D	L	GF	GA
Austria	1	1	0	0	2	0
Belgium	2	0	0	2	1	6
Denmark	1	1	0	0	3	1
France	1	0	1	0	1	1
Germany	2	0	1	1	2	4
Iceland	1	0	1	0	1	1
Portugal	2	0	1	1	3	6
Scotland	1	1	0	0	1	0
Soviet Union	1	0	0	1	0	1
Spain	1	0	0	1	1	2
Switzerland	1	0	0	1	1	3
Total	14	3	4	7	16	25

== See also ==
- Hungary at the FIFA World Cup
