= Russia at the UEFA European Championship =

International football delegation

Russia have participated in twelve UEFA European Championships, the second-most among all participants of the Euro after Germany, equalled to Spain, five of which were as the Soviet Union and one of which was representing the CIS (Commonwealth of Independent States). As the Soviet Union, their best performance was becoming champions in the inaugural 1960 edition in France, while their best performance as Russia came in the 2008 tournament held in Austria and Switzerland, when they reached the semi-finals.

== Overview ==
=== Overall record ===
- 1960–1992 as Soviet Union (CIS replaced Soviet Union for UEFA Euro 1992)
- 1992– as Russia

Champions Runners-up Third place

UEFA European Championship record									Qualification record						
Year	Round	Position	Pld	W	D*	L	GF	GA	Pld	W	D*	L	GF	GA	Campaign
as Soviet Union									as Soviet Union						
(France) 1960	Champions	1st	2	2	0	0	5	1	2	2	0	0	4	1	1960
(Spain) 1964	Runners-up	2nd	2	1	0	1	4	2	4	2	2	0	7	3	1964
(Italy) 1968	Fourth place	4th	2	0	1	1	0	2	8	6	0	2	19	8	1968
(Belgium) 1972	Runners-up	2nd	2	1	0	1	1	3	8	5	3	0	16	4	1972
(Socialist Federal Republic of Yugoslavia) 1976	Did not qualify								8	4	1	3	12	10	1976
(Italy) 1980	Did not qualify								6	1	3	2	7	8	1980
(France) 1984	Did not qualify								6	4	1	1	11	2	1984
(West Germany) 1988	Runners-up	2nd	5	3	1	1	7	4	8	5	3	0	14	3	1988
as CIS									as CIS						
(Sweden) 1992	Group stage	8th	3	0	2	1	1	4	8	5	3	0	13	2	1992
as Russia									as Russia						
(England) 1996	Group stage	14th	3	0	1	2	4	8	10	8	2	0	34	5	1996
(Belgium) (Netherlands) 2000	Did not qualify								10	6	1	3	22	12	2000
(Portugal) 2004	Group stage	10th	3	1	0	2	2	4	10	5	3	2	20	12	2004
(Austria) (Switzerland) 2008	Semi-finals	3rd	5	3	0	2	7	8	12	7	3	2	18	7	2008
(Poland) (Ukraine) 2012	Group stage	9th	3	1	1	1	5	3	10	7	2	1	17	4	2012
(France) 2016	Group stage	23rd	3	0	1	2	2	6	10	6	2	2	21	5	2016
(Europe) 2020	Group stage	18th	3	1	0	2	2	7	10	8	0	2	33	8	2020
(Germany) 2024	Banned								Banned						
(United Kingdom) (Republic of Ireland) 2028	Banned								Banned						
(Italy) (Turkey) 2032	To be determined								To be determined						2032
Total	1 Title	12/20	36	13	7	16	40	52	128	80	29	19	262	89	Total

== Head-to-head record ==
=== as Soviet Union ===
Opponent	Pld	W	D	L	GF	GA
Czechoslovakia	1	1	0	0	3	0
Denmark	1	1	0	0	3	0
England	2	1	0	1	3	3
Hungary	1	1	0	0	1	0
Italy	2	1	1	0	2	0
Netherlands	2	1	0	1	1	2
Republic of Ireland	1	0	1	0	1	1
Spain	1	0	0	1	1	2
Yugoslavia	1	1	0	0	2	1
West Germany	1	0	0	1	0	3
Total	13	7	2	4	17	12

=== as CIS ===
Opponent	Pld	W	D	L	GF	GA
Germany	1	0	1	0	1	1
Netherlands	1	0	1	0	0	0
Scotland	1	0	0	1	0	3
Total	3	0	2	1	1	4

=== as Russia ===
Opponent	Pld	W	D	L	GF	GA
Belgium	1	0	0	1	0	3
Czech Republic	2	1	1	0	7	4
Denmark	1	0	0	1	1	4
England	1	0	1	0	1	1
Finland	1	1	0	0	1	0
Germany	1	0	0	1	0	3
Greece	3	2	0	1	3	2
Italy	1	0	0	1	1	2
Netherlands	1	1	0	0	3	1
Poland	1	0	1	0	1	1
Portugal	1	0	0	1	0	2
Slovakia	1	0	0	1	1	2
Spain	3	0	0	3	1	8
Sweden	1	1	0	0	2	0
Wales	1	0	0	1	0	3
Total	20	6	3	11	22	36

== 1960 European Nations' Cup (as Soviet Union) ==
=== Final tournament ===
Semi-finals

6 July 1960
21:30

Czechoslovakia	0–3	Soviet Union
	Report	Ivanov 34', 56'; Ponedelnik 66'

Stade Vélodrome, Marseille
Attendance: 25,184
Referee: Cesare Jonni (Italy)

Final

10 July 1960
20:30

Soviet Union	2–1 (a.e.t.)	Yugoslavia
Metreveli 49'; Ponedelnik 113'	Report	Galić 43'

Parc des Princes, Paris
Attendance: 17,966
Referee: Arthur Ellis (England)

== 1964 European Nations' Cup (as Soviet Union) ==
=== Final tournament ===
Semi-finals

17 June 1964
22:30

Denmark	0–3	Soviet Union
	Report	Voronin 19'; Ponedelnik 40'; Ivanov 87'

Camp Nou, Barcelona
Attendance: 38,556
Referee: Concetto Lo Bello (Italy)

Final

21 June 1964
18:30

Spain	2–1	Soviet Union
Pereda 6'; Marcelino 84'	Report, lineups	Khusainov 8'

Santiago Bernabéu, Madrid
Attendance: 79,115
Referee: Arthur Holland (England)

== UEFA Euro 1968 (as Soviet Union) ==
=== Final tournament ===
Semi-finals

5 June 1968
18:00

Italy	0–0 (a.e.t.) Italy won on coin toss	Soviet Union
	Report

Stadio San Paolo, Naples
Attendance: 68,582
Referee: Kurt Tschenscher (West Germany)

Third place play-off

8 June 1968
18:45

England	2–0	Soviet Union
B. Charlton 39'; Hurst 63'	Report

Stadio Olimpico, Rome
Attendance: 68,817
Referee: István Zsolt (Hungary)

== UEFA Euro 1972 (as Soviet Union) ==
=== Final tournament ===
Semi-finals

14 June 1972
20:00

Hungary	0–1	Soviet Union
	Report	Konkov 53'

Stade Émile Versé, Brussels
Attendance: 1,659
Referee: Rudi Glöckner (East Germany)

Final

18 June 1972
16:00

West Germany	3–0	Soviet Union
Müller 27', 58'; Wimmer 52'	Report

Heysel Stadium, Brussels
Attendance: 43,437
Referee: Ferdinand Marschall (Austria)

== UEFA Euro 1988 (as Soviet Union) ==
=== Group stage ===
Pos	Team	Pld	W	D	L	GF	GA	GD	Pts	Qualification
1	Soviet Union	3	2	1	0	5	2	+3	5	Advance to knockout stage
2	Netherlands	3	2	0	1	4	2	+2	4	Advance to knockout stage
3	Republic of Ireland	3	1	1	1	2	2	0	3	
4	England	3	0	0	3	2	7	−5	0	

Source: UEFA
Rules for classification: Group stage tiebreakers
12 June 1988
20:15

Netherlands	0–1	Soviet Union
	Report	Rats 52'

Müngersdorfer Stadion, Cologne
Attendance: 54,336
Referee: Dieter Pauly (West Germany)

15 June 1988
20:15

Republic of Ireland	1–1	Soviet Union
Whelan 38'	Report	Protasov 74'

Niedersachsenstadion, Hanover
Attendance: 38,308
Referee: Emilio Soriano Aladrén (Spain)

18 June 1988
15:30

England	1–3	Soviet Union
Adams 16'	Report	Aleinikov 3'; Mykhaylychenko 28'; Pasulko 73'

Waldstadion, Frankfurt
Attendance: 48,335
Referee: José Rosa dos Santos (Portugal)

=== Knockout stage ===
Semi-finals

22 June 1988
20:15

Soviet Union	2–0	Italy
Lytovchenko 58'; Protasov 62'	Report

Neckarstadion, Stuttgart
Attendance: 61,606
Referee: Alexis Ponnet (Belgium)

Final

25 June 1988
15:30

Soviet Union	0–2	Netherlands
	Report	Gullit 32'; Van Basten 53'

Olympiastadion, Munich
Attendance: 62,770
Referee: Michel Vautrot (France)

== UEFA Euro 1992 (as CIS) ==
=== Group stage ===
Pos	Team	Pld	W	D	L	GF	GA	GD	Pts	Qualification
1	Netherlands	3	2	1	0	4	1	+3	5	Advance to knockout stage
2	Germany	3	1	1	1	4	4	0	3	Advance to knockout stage
3	Scotland	3	1	0	2	3	3	0	2	
4	CIS	3	0	2	1	1	4	−3	2	

Source: UEFA
Rules for classification: Group stage tiebreakers
12 June 1992
20:15

CIS	1–1	Germany
Dobrovolski 64' (pen.)	Report	Häßler 90'

Idrottsparken, Norrköping
Attendance: 17,410
Referee: Gérard Biguet (France)

15 June 1992
20:15

Netherlands	0–0	CIS
	Report

Ullevi, Gothenburg
Attendance: 34,440
Referee: Peter Mikkelsen (Denmark)

18 June 1992
20:15

Scotland	3–0	CIS
McStay 7'; McClair 16'; McAllister 84' (pen.)	Report

Idrottsparken, Norrköping
Attendance: 14,660
Referee: Kurt Röthlisberger (Switzerland)

== UEFA Euro 1996 ==
=== Group stage ===
Pos	Team	Pld	W	D	L	GF	GA	GD	Pts	Qualification
1	Germany	3	2	1	0	5	0	+5	7	Advance to knockout stage
2	Czech Republic	3	1	1	1	5	6	−1	4 (Note: Head-to-head result: Czech Republic 2–1 Italy.)	Advance to knockout stage
3	Italy	3	1	1	1	3	3	0	4	
4	Russia	3	0	1	2	4	8	−4	1	

Source: UEFA
Rules for classification: Group stage tiebreakers
Notes:
11 June 1996
16:30

Italy	2–1	Russia
Casiraghi 5', 52'	Report	Tsymbalar 21'

Anfield, Liverpool
Attendance: 35,120
Referee: Leslie Mottram (Scotland)

16 June 1996
15:00

Russia	0–3	Germany
	Report	Sammer 56'; Klinsmann 77', 90'

Old Trafford, Manchester
Attendance: 50,760
Referee: Kim Milton Nielsen (Denmark)

19 June 1996
19:30

Russia	3–3	Czech Republic
Mostovoi 49'; Tetradze 54'; Beschastnykh 85'	Report	Suchopárek 5'; Kuka 19'; Šmicer 88'

Anfield, Liverpool
Attendance: 21,128
Referee: Anders Frisk (Sweden)

== UEFA Euro 2004 ==
=== Group stage ===
Pos	Team	Pld	W	D	L	GF	GA	GD	Pts	Qualification
1	Portugal (H)	3	2	0	1	4	2	+2	6	Advance to knockout stage
2	Greece	3	1	1	1	4	4	0	4 (Note: Tied on head-to-head result (Greece 1–1 Spain) and overall goal difference (0). Overall goals for was used as the tiebreaker.)	Advance to knockout stage
3	Spain	3	1	1	1	2	2	0	4	
4	Russia	3	1	0	2	2	4	−2	3	

Source: UEFA
Rules for classification: Group stage tiebreakers
(H) Hosts
Notes:
12 June 2004
19:45

Spain	1–0	Russia
Valerón 60'	Report

Estádio Algarve, Faro/Loulé
Attendance: 28,182
Referee: Urs Meier (Switzerland)

16 June 2004
19:45

Russia	0–2	Portugal
	Report	Maniche 7'; Rui Costa 89'

Estádio da Luz, Lisbon
Attendance: 59,273
Referee: Terje Hauge (Norway)

20 June 2004
19:45

Russia	2–1	Greece
Kirichenko 2'; Bulykin 17'	Report	Vryzas 43'

Estádio Algarve, Faro/Loulé
Attendance: 24,347
Referee: Gilles Veissière (France)

== UEFA Euro 2008 ==
=== Group stage ===
Pos	Team	Pld	W	D	L	GF	GA	GD	Pts	Qualification
1	Spain	3	3	0	0	8	3	+5	9	Advance to knockout stage
2	Russia	3	2	0	1	4	4	0	6	Advance to knockout stage
3	Sweden	3	1	0	2	3	4	−1	3	
4	Greece	3	0	0	3	1	5	−4	0	

Source: UEFA
Rules for classification: Group stage tiebreakers
10 June 2008
18:00

Spain	4–1	Russia
Villa 20', 44', 75'; Fàbregas 90+1'	Report	Pavlyuchenko 86'

Tivoli-Neu, Innsbruck
Attendance: 30,772
Referee: Konrad Plautz (Austria)

14 June 2008
20:45

Greece	0–1	Russia
	Report	Zyryanov 33'

Stadion Wals-Siezenheim, Salzburg
Attendance: 31,063
Referee: Roberto Rosetti (Italy)

18 June 2008
20:45

Russia	2–0	Sweden
Pavlyuchenko 24'; Arshavin 50'	Report

Tivoli-Neu, Innsbruck
Attendance: 30,772
Referee: Frank De Bleeckere (Belgium)

=== Knockout stage ===
Quarter-finals

21 June 2008
20:45

Netherlands	1–3 (a.e.t.)	Russia
Van Nistelrooy 86'	Report	Pavlyuchenko 56'; Torbinski 112'; Arshavin 116'

St. Jakob-Park, Basel
Attendance: 38,374
Referee: Ľuboš Micheľ (Slovakia)

Semi-finals

26 June 2008
20:45

Russia	0–3	Spain
	Report	Xavi 50'; Güiza 73'; Silva 82'

Ernst-Happel-Stadion, Vienna
Attendance: 51,428
Referee: Frank De Bleeckere (Belgium)

== UEFA Euro 2012 ==
=== Group stage ===
Pos	Team	Pld	W	D	L	GF	GA	GD	Pts	Qualification
1	Czech Republic	3	2	0	1	4	5	−1	6	Advance to knockout stage
2	Greece	3	1	1	1	3	3	0	4 (Note: Head-to-head result: Greece 1–0 Russia.)	Advance to knockout stage
3	Russia	3	1	1	1	5	3	+2	4	
4	Poland (H)	3	0	2	1	2	3	−1	2	

Source: UEFA
Rules for classification: Group stage tiebreakers
(H) Hosts
Notes:
8 June 2012
20:45 CEST

Russia	4–1	Czech Republic
Dzagoev 15', 79'; Shirokov 24'; Pavlyuchenko 82'	Report	Pilař 52'

Stadion Miejski, Wrocław
Attendance: 40,803
Referee: Howard Webb (England)

12 June 2012
20:45 CEST

Poland	1–1	Russia
Błaszczykowski 57'	Report	Dzagoev 37'

National Stadium, Warsaw
Attendance: 55,920
Referee: Wolfgang Stark (Germany)

16 June 2012
20:45 CEST

Greece	1–0	Russia
Karagounis 45+2'	Report

National Stadium, Warsaw
Attendance: 55,614
Referee: Jonas Eriksson (Sweden)

== UEFA Euro 2016 ==
=== Group stage ===
Pos	Team	Pld	W	D	L	GF	GA	GD	Pts	Qualification
1	Wales	3	2	0	1	6	3	+3	6	Advance to knockout stage
2	England	3	1	2	0	3	2	+1	5	Advance to knockout stage
3	Slovakia	3	1	1	1	3	3	0	4	Advance to knockout stage
4	Russia	3	0	1	2	2	6	−4	1	

Source: UEFA
Rules for classification: Group stage tiebreakers
11 June 2016
21:00

England	1–1	Russia
Dier 73'	Report	V. Berezutski 90+2'

Stade Vélodrome, Marseille
Attendance: 62,343
Referee: Nicola Rizzoli (Italy)

15 June 2016
15:00

Russia	1–2	Slovakia
Glushakov 80'	Report	Weiss 32'; Hamšík 45'

Stade Pierre-Mauroy, Villeneuve-d'Ascq
Attendance: 38,989
Referee: Damir Skomina (Slovenia)

20 June 2016
21:00

Russia	0–3	Wales
	Report	Ramsey 11'; Taylor 20'; Bale 67'

Stadium Municipal, Toulouse
Attendance: 28,840
Referee: Jonas Eriksson (Sweden)

== UEFA Euro 2020 ==
=== Group stage ===
Pos	Team	Pld	W	D	L	GF	GA	GD	Pts	Qualification
1	Belgium	3	3	0	0	7	1	+6	9	Advance to knockout stage
2	Denmark (H)	3	1	0	2	5	4	+1	3 (Note: Tied on head-to-head points (3). Head-to-head goal difference: Denmark +2, Finland 0, Russia −2.)	Advance to knockout stage
3	Finland	3	1	0	2	1	3	−2	3	
4	Russia (H)	3	1	0	2	2	7	−5	3	

Source: UEFA
Rules for classification: Group stage tiebreakers
(H) Hosts
Notes:
12 June 2021
21:00 (22:00 UTC+3)

Belgium	3–0	Russia
Lukaku 10', 88'; Meunier 34'	Report

Krestovsky Stadium, Saint Petersburg
Attendance: 26,264
Referee: Antonio Mateu Lahoz (Spain)

16 June 2021
15:00 (16:00 UTC+3)

Finland	0–1	Russia
	Report	Miranchuk 45+2'

Krestovsky Stadium, Saint Petersburg
Attendance: 24,540
Referee: Danny Makkelie (Netherlands)

21 June 2021
21:00

Russia	1–4	Denmark
Dzyuba 70' (pen.)	Report	Damsgaard 38'; Poulsen 59'; Christensen 79'; Mæhle 82'

Parken Stadium, Copenhagen
Attendance: 23,644
Referee: Clément Turpin (France)

== Goalscorers ==
Successor team of Soviet Union (1960–1988) and CIS (1992).

Player	Goals	1960	1964	1968	1972	1988	1992	1996	2004	2008	2012	2016	2020
Roman Pavlyuchenko	4									3	1		
Alan Dzagoev	3										3		
Valentin Ivanov	3	2	1										
Viktor Ponedelnik	3	2	1										
Andrey Arshavin	2									2			
Oleg Protasov	2					2							
Sergei Aleinikov	1					1							
Vasili Berezutski	1											1	
Vladimir Beschastnykh	1							1					
Dmitri Bulykin	1								1				
Igor Dobrovolski	1						1						
Artem Dzyuba	1												1
Denis Glushakov	1											1	
Galimzyan Khusainov	1		1										
Dmitri Kirichenko	1								1				
Anatoli Konkov	1				1								
Gennady Litovchenko	1					1							
Slava Metreveli	1	1											
Aleksei Mikhailichenko	1					1							
Aleksei Miranchuk	1												1
Alexander Mostovoi	1							1					
Victor Pasulko	1					1							
Vasily Rats	1					1							
Roman Shirokov	1										1		
Omar Tetradze	1							1					
Dmitri Torbinski	1									1			
Ilia Tsymbalar	1							1					
Valeri Voronin	1		1										
Konstantin Zyryanov	1									1			
Total	40	5	4	0	1	7	1	4	2	7	5	2	2

== See also ==
- Russia at the FIFA Confederations Cup
- Russia at the FIFA World Cup
