= Kaj Hansen =

Kaj Hansen may refer to:

- Kaj Hansen (footballer, born 1917) (1917–1987), Danish footballer who played 27 Danish national team games
- Kaj Hansen (footballer, born 1940) (1940–2009), Danish footballer who played seven Danish national team games
