= Wolmar (surname) =

Wolmar is a surname. Notable people with the surname include:

- Bent Wolmar (1937–2024), Danish footballer
- Christian Wolmar (born 1949), British journalist, politician and railway historian
- Isabel Wolmar (1933–2019), actor
- Melchior Wolmar (1497–1560)

See also Valmiera, city in Latvia.
