= Miguel Jones =

Spanish footballer (1938–2020)

Personal information
- Full name: Miguel Jones Castillo
- Date of birth: 27 October 1938
- Place of birth: Santa Isabel, Spanish Guinea (now Malabo, Equatorial Guinea)
- Date of death: 8 April 2020 (aged 81)
- Place of death: Bilbao, Spain
- Height: 1.78 m (5 ft 10 in)
- Position: Midfielder

Senior career*
Years	Team	Apps	(Gls)
1956	Baracaldo	15	(4)
1956–1959	Indauchu	56	(24)
1959–1967	Atlético Madrid	80	(28)
1967–1968	Osasuna	10	(2)
Total		161	(58)
- * Club domestic league appearances and goals as of 8 September 2006 ‡ National team caps and goals as of 8 September 2006

Miguel Jones Castillo (Spanish pronunciation: [mi'ɣel 'xones]; 27 October 1938 – 8 April 2020) was a Spanish footballer who played as a midfielder for SD Indautxu and Atlético Madrid during the 1950s and 1960s.

== Early life ==
Although born in Spanish Guinea, now known as Equatorial Guinea, Jones grew up in Bilbao. He was partly Krio Fernandino as his paternal grandfather was a descendant from Liberated Africans who had moved to Fernando Poo from Sierra Leone. His maternal side, the Castillo, was of Cuban descent.

== Football career ==
Jones began his career with local sides Barakaldo and Indautxu, where his teammates included the veteran Lezama and another emerging young player, Chus Pereda. Jones and Pereda, and later a third Indautxu player, José Eulogio Gárate, were all controversially rejected by Athletic Bilbao because the club's signing policy required for them to be born in Biscay; he maintained throughout his life that his rejection was not due to racism, as the other shunned players were white.

Jones eventually joined Atlético Madrid where under coach José Villalonga he was a prominent member of an Atlético team that also included Enrique Collar and Adelardo. He played in two successive Copa del Generalísimo finals for Atlético against Real Madrid in 1960 and 1961. Atlético won on both occasions and in the 1960 final Jones scored the opening goal in a 3–1 victory. He made a third appearance in a Copa final in 1964 as Atlético lost 2–1 to Zaragoza. Jones also played for Atlético in two successive European Cup Winners Cup finals in 1962 and 1963. He scored again in the 1962 final as Atlético beat Fiorentina 3–0 after a replay but finished on the losing side when they lost 5–1 to Tottenham Hotspur in 1963. He also won a La Liga title with Atlético in 1966.

In October 1967, Jones was signed for a season with Osasuna, his last club.

== Later life ==
After retiring as a player he returned to live in Bilbao and served as a director at SD Indautxu. Jones was a teammate and friend of Luis Aragonés; when the Spain manager was accused of racism in 2004, he cited his friendship with Jones as proof that he was not.

Jones died on 8 April 2020 at the age of 81. He had cancer for a long period before dying in Bilbao during the coronavirus pandemic.

== Honours ==
- Spanish Champions: 1
  - 1966
- Copa del Generalísimo: 3
  - 1960, 1961, 1965
- European Cup Winners Cup: 1
  - 1962
