= José Villalonga =

Spanish football manager (1919–1973)

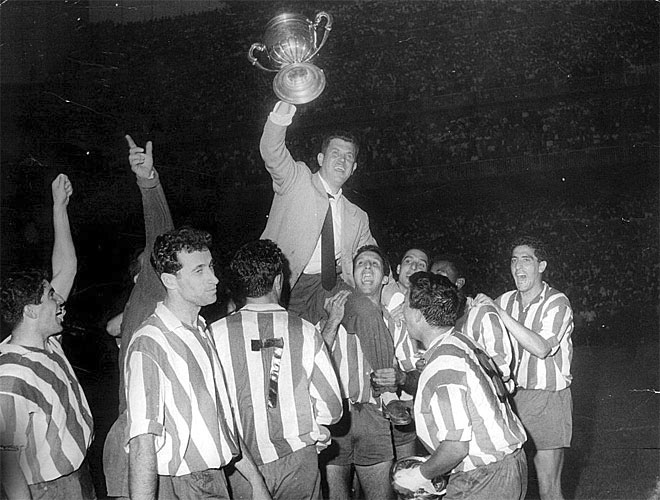
- Villalonga being lifted by his players after winning the 1960 Copa del Generalísimo final

Personal information
- Full name: José Villalonga Llorente
- Date of birth: 12 December 1919
- Place of birth: Córdoba, Spain
- Date of death: 7 August 1973 (aged 53)
- Place of death: Madrid, Spain

Managerial career
- Years: Team
- 1954–1957: Real Madrid
- 1959–1962: Atlético Madrid
- 1962–1966: Spain
Medal record
Representing Spain (as manager)
European Nations' Cup
Winner	1964 Spain

José "Pepe" Villalonga Llorente (12 December 1919 – 7 August 1973) was a Spanish football manager during the 1950s and 1960s. He coached Real Madrid, Atlético Madrid, and the Spain national team, winning major trophies with all three.

== Managerial career ==
=== Real Madrid ===
Villalonga was appointed manager of Real Madrid during the middle of the 1954–55 season and subsequently coached a team that included Alfredo Di Stéfano, Francisco Gento, Miguel Muñoz, Hector Rial and later, Raymond Kopa. During his first season they achieved a double, winning both La Liga and the Latin Cup. In 1956, Villalonga became the first manager to win the European Cup. At 36 years and 184 days at the time, he also remains to date the youngest manager to win the title. During his final season at Real he guided the team to a double: La Liga and the European Cup.

=== Atlético Madrid ===
In 1959, Villalonga became manager at Atlético Madrid. With Villalonga in charge and with a team that included Enrique Collar, Miguel Jones and Adelardo, Atlético defeated Real in two successive Copa del Generalísimo finals in 1960 and 1961. They finished as runners-up in 1961 La Liga. In 1962, they won the European Cup Winners Cup, beating Fiorentina 3–0 after a replay.

=== Spain ===
In 1962, Villalonga was appointed manager of Spain. In 1964, the team won the European Championship title. With a squad that included Luis Suárez, Francisco Gento, Josep Maria Fusté and José Ángel Iribar, Spain beat Romania, Northern Ireland and the Republic of Ireland in the qualifying rounds before hosting the semi-finals and final. In the semi-final, Spain beat Hungary 2–1. In the final, Spain successfully contested the USSR 2–1 in front of a crowd of 125,000 at the Bernabéu. Chus Pereda put Spain ahead after six minutes but a late Marcelino Martínez header was needed to win after Galimzian Khusainov equalised with a free-kick.

Villalonga took Spain to a less successful 1966 World Cup in England. Two consecutive defeats to Germany and Argentina after a 2–1 win over Switzerland left Spain and Villalonga to an early return home. The loss to Germany was his last of 22 games in charge of Spain.

Villalonga devoted his time to teaching at the technical level. In 1967, he was appointed director of the National Coaches School, a position he held until his death in 1973, and was the first Teacher of Football in the INEF Madrid.

He died in Madrid, as a result of a myocardial infarction on 7 August 1973, at the age of 53.

== Managerial honours ==
=== Club ===
Real Madrid

- European Cup:
  - 1955–56, 1956–57
- Spanish Championship:
  - 1954–55, 1956–57
- Latin Cup:
  - 1955, 1957

Atlético Madrid

- Copa del Generalísimo:
  - 1959–60, 1960–61
- Spanish Championship:
  - Runners-up 1960–61
- UEFA Cup Winners' Cup:
  - 1961–62

=== International ===
Spain

- European Championship:
  - 1964

== See also ==
- List of European Cup and UEFA Champions League winning managers
