= Yuri Shikunov =

Soviet and Russian footballer and manager (1939–2021)

Personal information
- Full name: Yuri Ivanovich Shikunov
- Date of birth: 8 December 1939
- Place of birth: Taganrog, Russian SFSR, Soviet Union
- Date of death: 15 March 2021 (aged 81)
- Height: 1.73 m (5 ft 8 in)
- Position: Midfielder

Senior career*
Years	Team	Apps	(Gls)
1957–1958	Torpedo Taganrog	52	(15)
1959–1967	SKA Rostov-on-Don	215	(15)
1968	Rostselmash	26	(7)
Total		293	(37)

Managerial career
- 1983–1984: SKA Rostov-on-Don (director)
- 1991–1995: Rostselmash (director)
- 1993: Rostselmash-D (assistant)
- 1997: Shakhtyor Shakhty
Medal record
Representing Soviet Union
UEFA European Championship
Runner-up	1964 Spain
- * Club domestic league appearances and goals

Yuri Ivanovich Shikunov (Russian: Юрий Иванович Шикунов; 8 December 1939 – 15 March 2021) was a Soviet and Russian footballer and manager who played as a midfielder.

== Honours ==
=== Club ===
- Soviet Top League runner-up: 1966

=== Country ===
- UEFA European Championship runner-up: 1964

=== Individual ===
- Included in list of the 33 best players of the USSR
  - No. 2: 1960
  - No. 3: 1961

=== Awards ===
- Master of Sports of the USSR: 1960
- Honoured Coach of the Russian SFSR: 1990
