= Poul Petersen (footballer) =

Danish footballer and manager (1921–1997)

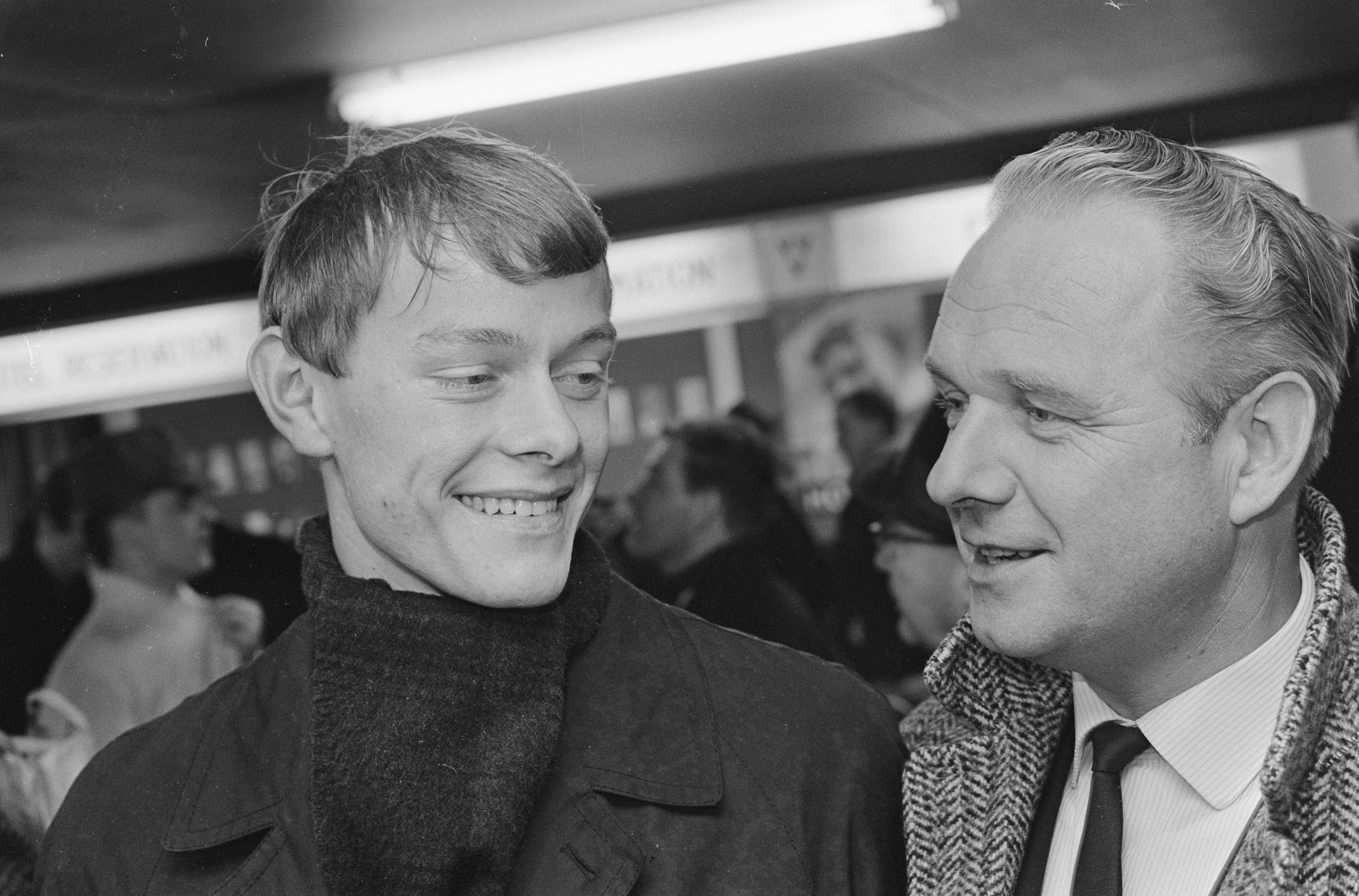
- Poul Petersen (right) with Henning Munk Jensen.

Personal information
- Full name: Poul Eyvind Petersen
- Date of birth: 11 April 1921
- Place of birth: Copenhagen, Denmark
- Date of death: 31 May 1997 (aged 76)
- Place of death: Tisvildeleje, Denmark
- Height: 5 ft 11 in (1.80 m)
- Position: Defender

Senior career*
Years	Team	Apps	(Gls)
–	AB		

International career
1945	Denmark U-21	1	(0)
1946–1952	Denmark	34	(0)

Managerial career
- 1962–1966: Denmark
- 1973–1976: Hillerød G&IF
- * Club domestic league appearances and goals

Olympic medal record

Men's Football

Representing Denmark
Bronze medal – third place	1948 London	Team competition

Poul Eyvind Petersen (11 April 1921 – 31 May 1997) was a Danish amateur football player and manager. During his career he played for AB, and earned 34 caps for the Denmark national football team from 1946 to 1952. He won a bronze medal in football at the 1948 Summer Olympics, and also participated four years later in the 1952 Olympics. He was manager of the national team from 1962 to 1966.

== Biography ==
Poul Petersen started his career as an attacker, and was one of legendary centre forward Carl "Skoma'r" Hansen's best students. Petersen was a quick player, with great technique and a fierce shot. He made his senior debut for Akademisk Boldklub (AB) in the inside forward position, but eventually settled in the defense as a full-back. He was expected to hoof the ball away whenever he had stripped an opposition player of the ball, but instead he did smart dribbles and passes, and received some criticism for his adventurous style.

Poul Petersen made his debut for the Danish national team in June 1946, and quickly established himself in the starting line-up. In 1947, Petersen was selected for the Europe XI team, which played an exhibition game against the Great Britain national football team, losing 1–6 at Hampden Park. This game earned him the nickname "Europa-Poul". In the run-up to the 1948 Summer Olympics, Petersen suffered an injury. He was a part of the Danish team at the tournament, but despite declaring himself fit to play, he was left out of the starting line-up for the entire competition. Denmark won bronze medals at the tournament, but while most of the Danish players went on to sign professional contracts with foreign teams, Poul Petersen stayed in Denmark. He was a part of the Danish team which competed at the 1952 Summer Olympics in Helsinki. Denmark was eliminated in the quarter-finals by the Yugoslavia national football team, in what was Poul Petersen's last international game.

He was appointed manager of the Danish national team in 1962, replacing Arne Sørensen, who had managed Denmark to silver medals at the 1960 Summer Olympics. Unfortunately for Petersen, most of the 1960 silver medalists were now banned from the amateur-only national team for having signed professional contracts, and Danish football didn't have the amateur players to follow up on the success. He managed Denmark to fourth place of four participants at the 1964 European Nations' Cup, having beaten the Malta national football team, Albania national football team, and Luxembourg national football team in the qualification games. Poul Petersen was in charge of Denmark for 47 games until November 1966, winning 17 and losing 22 games.
