= Arthur Blavier =

Belgian football referee

- Blavier in 1961
- Full name: Antoine Blavier
- Born: 28 January 1914; Namur, Belgium
- Died: 15 September 1991 (aged 77); Namur, Belgium

Domestic
Years	League	Role
–1964	Belgian First Division A	Referee

International
Years	League	Role
1960–1964	FIFA listed	Referee

Antoine "Arthur" Blavier (28 January 1914 – 15 September 1991) was a Belgian football referee.

== Refereeing career ==
Blavier spent his career refereeing in the Belgian First Division A, the top flight of Belgian football. In 1960, he was appointed as a FIFA referee.

In 1962, Blavier was selected as a referee for the 1962 FIFA World Cup, where he officiated a group stage match between England and Bulgaria.

Two years later, Blavier was appointed as a referee for the 1964 European Nations' Cup, where he officiated a semi-final match between Spain and Hungary.

Blavier retired from refereeing in 1964.
