= Imre Komora =

Hungarian footballer (1940–2024)

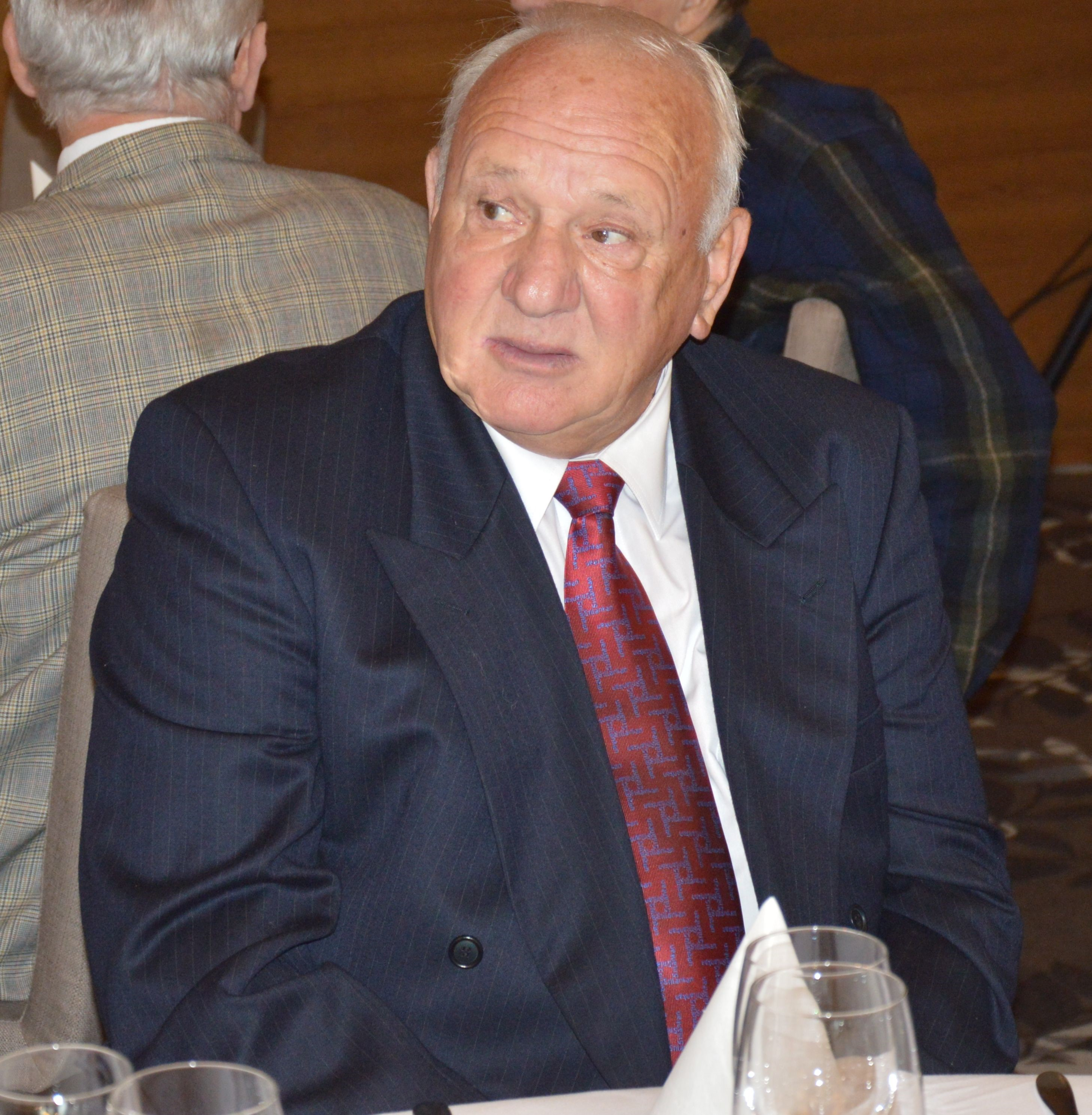
- Komora in 2013

Personal information
- Date of birth: 5 June 1940
- Place of birth: Budapest, Hungary
- Date of death: 15 August 2024 (aged 84)
- Place of death: Budapest, Hungary
- Position: Midfielder

Senior career*
Years	Team	Apps	(Gls)
1959–1960	Szombathelyi Haladás	35	(8)
1961–1972	Budapest Honvéd	277	(64)
Total		312	(72)

International career
1964–1968	Hungary	2	(0)

Managerial career
- 1982–1986: Budapest Honvéd
- 1986: Hungary
- 1987: Budapest Honvéd
- 1989–1990: Olympiacos
- 1997–1998: Budapest Honvéd
- 1999: Budapest Honvéd
Medal record
Men's football
Representing Hungary
Olympic Games
Gold medal – first place	1964 Tokyo	Team competition
UEFA European Championship
Bronze medal – third place	1964 Spain	Team competition
- * Club domestic league appearances and goals

Imre Komora (5 June 1940 – 15 August 2024) was a Hungarian footballer, who played as a midfielder for Szombathelyi Haladás and Budapest Honvéd. For the Hungary national team, he participated in the 1964 European Nations' Cup. He also won a gold medal in football at the 1964 Summer Olympics.

Later he served as the head coach of the Hungary national team in 1986. As a coach, they won three consecutive championship titles with Honvéd, as well as the Hungarian Cup in 1985. He was the father-in-law of Lajos Détári who was once married to Komora's daughter.

Komora died in Budapest on 15 August 2024, at the age of 84.
