= Erling Nielsen (footballer) =

Danish footballer (1935–1996)

Erling Nielsen (2 January 1935 – 15 September 1996) was a Danish footballer. During his club career he played for Boldklubben 1909. He earned 3 caps for the Denmark national football team, and was in the finals squad for the 1964 European Nations' Cup.
