= Ferenc Sipos =

Hungarian footballer and trainer

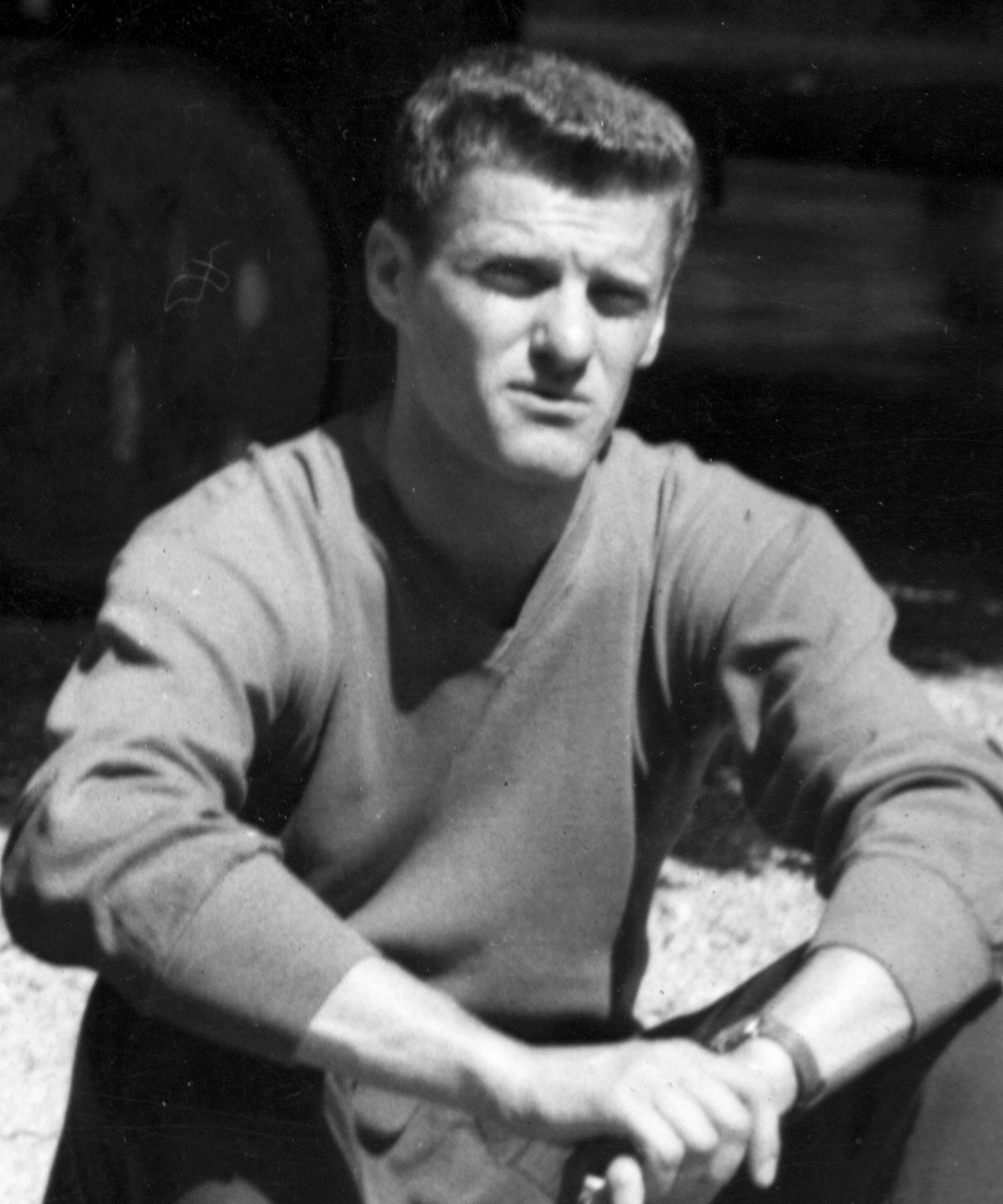
- Sipos in 1958

Personal information
- Date of birth: 13 December 1932
- Place of birth: Budapest, Hungary
- Date of death: 17 March 1997 (aged 64)
- Place of death: Budapest, Hungary
- Position: Defender

Senior career*
Years	Team	Apps	(Gls)
1955–1964	MTK Hungária FC		
1964–1968	Budapest Honvéd FC		

International career
1957–1966	Hungary	77	(1)
- * Club domestic league appearances and goals

Ferenc Sipos (13 December 1932 – 17 March 1997) was a Hungarian footballer and trainer.

During his club career he played for MTK Hungária FC and Budapest Honvéd FC. He earned 77 caps and scored 1 goal for the Hungary national football team from 1957 to 1966, and participated in the 1958 FIFA World Cup, the 1962 FIFA World Cup, the 1964 European Nations' Cup, and the 1966 FIFA World Cup.
