= Kálmán Ihász =

Hungarian footballer (1941–2019)

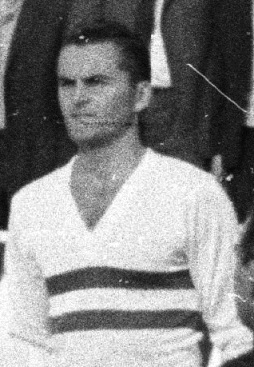

Personal information
- Full name: Kálmán Ihász
- Date of birth: 6 March 1941
- Place of birth: Budapest, Hungary
- Date of death: 31 January 2019 (aged 77)
- Place of death: Budapest
- Position: Defender

Senior career*
Years	Team	Apps	(Gls)
1958–1972	Vasas	363	(19)

International career
1962–1969	Hungary	27	(0)
Medal record
Men's football
Representing Hungary
Olympic Games
Gold medal – first place	1964 Tokyo	Team competition
- * Club domestic league appearances and goals

Kálmán Ihász (6 March 1941 – 31 January 2019) was a Hungarian footballer.

During his club career he played for Vasas SC. For the Hungary national football team, he participated in the 1962 FIFA World Cup, the 1964 European Nations' Cup, and the 1966 FIFA World Cup. He also won a gold medal in football at the 1964 Summer Olympics.

== Sources ==
- Kálmán Ihász at WorldFootball.net
