= Daniel Mellet =

Swiss football referee (1923–2017)

- Born: 8 June 1923; Lausanne, Switzerland
- Died: 29 July 2017 (aged 94); Lausanne, Switzerland

Domestic
Years	League	Role
1955–1964	Swiss Super League	Referee

International
Years	League	Role
1959–1964	FIFA listed	Referee

Daniel Emile Mellet (8 June 1923 – 29 July 2017) was a Swiss football referee.

== Refereeing career ==
In 1955, Mellet began refereeing in the Swiss Super League, the top flight of football in Switzerland. In 1959, he was appointed as a FIFA referee.

In 1964, Mellet was appointed as a referee for the 1964 European Nations' Cup, where he officiated the third place play-off between Hungary and Denmark. Mellet retired from refereeing in 1964.
