= Birger Larsen (footballer) =

Danish footballer (1942–2024)

Personal information
- Full name: Birger Hvirring Larsen
- Date of birth: 27 March 1942
- Place of birth: Copenhagen, Denmark
- Date of death: 28 January 2024 (aged 81)
- Position: Centre half

Youth career
- 1951–1960: Boldklubben Frem

Senior career*
Years	Team	Apps	(Gls)
1961–1969	Boldklubben Frem	199	(1)

International career
1961	Denmark U23	5	(0)
1963–1966	Denmark	12	(0)
- * Club domestic league appearances and goals

Birger Hvirring Larsen (born Ole Hvirring Larsen; 27 March 1942 – 28 January 2024) was a Danish football player who spent his entire career with Boldklubben Frem. He played 12 games for the Denmark national football team, and participated in the 1964 European Championship. After finishing his career Larsen worked in insurance.
