= Alexey Korneyev =

Russian footballer

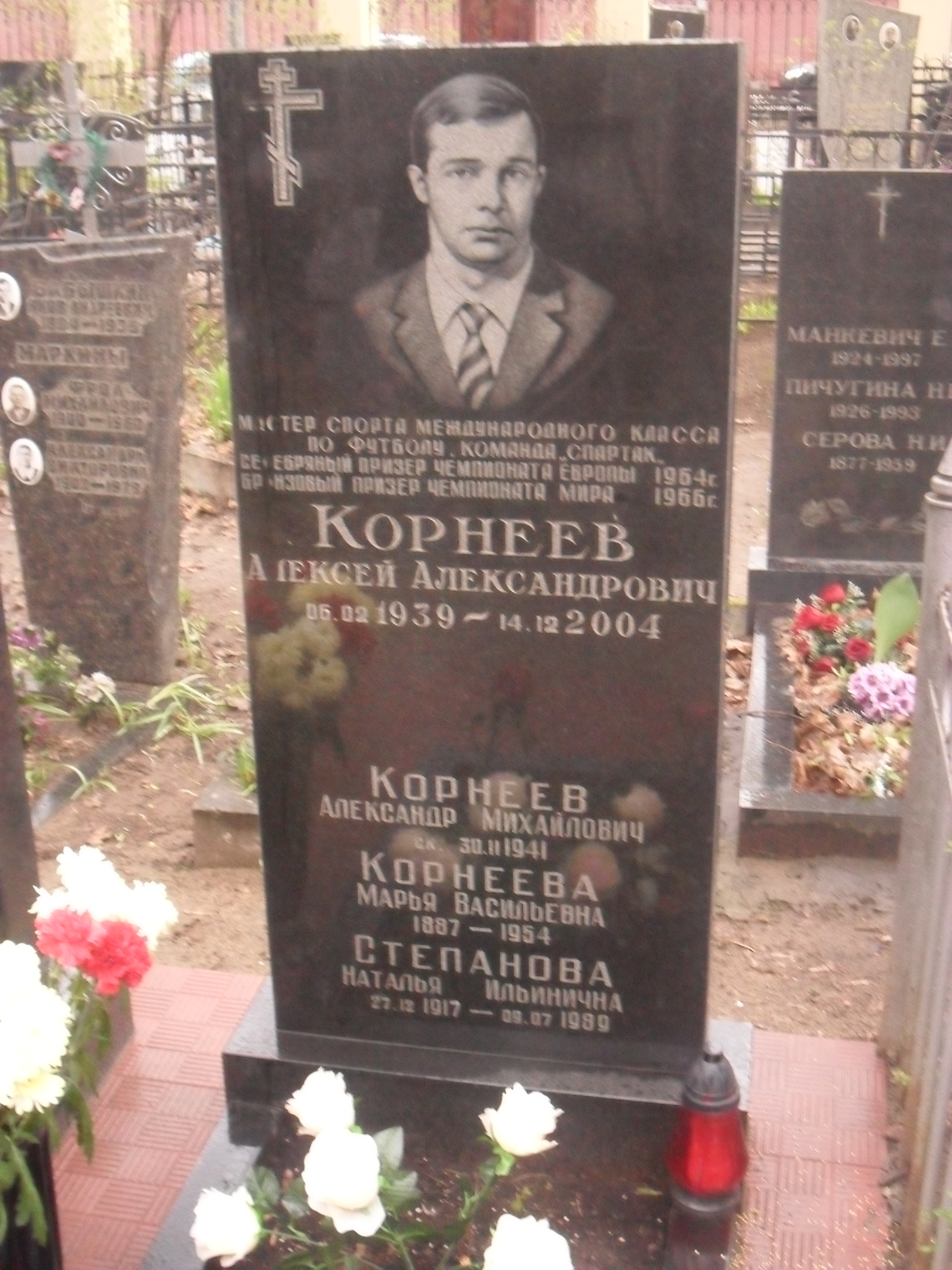

Personal information
- Full name: Alexey Aleksandrovich Korneyev
- Date of birth: February 6, 1939
- Place of birth: Moscow, USSR
- Date of death: December 14, 2004 (aged 65)
- Place of death: Moscow, Russia
- Height: 1.78 m (5 ft 10 in)
- Positions: Midfielder; defender

Youth career
- FC Spartak Moscow

Senior career*
Years	Team	Apps	(Gls)
1957–1967	FC Spartak Moscow	177	(0)
1968–1969	FC Shinnik Yaroslavl	46	(0)
Total		223	(0)

International career
1964–1966	USSR	6	(0)

Managerial career
- 1970–1984: Iskra Moscow
- 1990–1992: FC Asmaral Moscow (director)
Medal record
Representing Soviet Union
UEFA European Championship
Runner-up	1964 Spain
- * Club domestic league appearances and goals

Aleksey Aleksandrovich Korneyev (Russian: Алексей Александрович Корнеев; February 6, 1939 – December 14, 2004) was a Russian footballer.

== Honours ==
- Soviet Top League winner: 1962.
- Soviet Cup winner: 1963, 1965.

== International career ==
He earned 6 caps for the USSR national football team, and participated in the 1964 European Nations' Cup, where the Soviets were the runners-up, and the 1966 FIFA World Cup, where the Soviets finished fourth.
