= Viktor Shustikov =

Soviet-Russian footballer (1939–2025)

Personal information
- Full name: Viktor Mikhailovich Shustikov
- Date of birth: 28 January 1939
- Place of birth: Moscow, Russian SFSR, Soviet Union
- Date of death: October 2025 (aged 86)
- Position: Defender

Senior career*
Years	Team	Apps	(Gls)
1958–1973	Torpedo Moscow	427	(16)

International career
1963–1964	USSR	8	(0)

Managerial career
- 1974–1980: Torpedo Moscow (assistant)
- 1983: Volgar Astrakhan
- 1984–1997: Torpedo Moscow (youth teams)
- 2003: Torpedo-ZIL Moscow (scout)
Medal record
Representing Soviet Union
UEFA European Championship
Runner-up	1964 Spain
- * Club domestic league appearances and goals

Viktor Mikhailovich Shustikov (Russian: Виктор Михайлович Шустиков; 28 January 1939 – October 2025) was a Russian footballer who played as a defender. From Moscow, he played for the club Torpedo Moscow for the entirety of his senior career, from 1958 to 1973. He made 427 appearances for them, a record, and helped them win the Soviet Top League championship twice as well as the Soviet Cup three times. He also made eight appearances for the USSR national football team, being a member of their silver medal-winning team at the 1964 European Nations' Cup. After his playing career, he worked as a coach.

== Early life and playing career ==
Shustikov was born on 28 January 1939 in Moscow, Russian SFSR, Soviet Union, the son of a factory worker. He played several sports growing up and played football for the youth squad of the Fili club starting in 1952, where he won two Moscow championships. While playing for Fili, Shustikov was noticed by scouts for the club Torpedo Moscow, who invited him to the Youth Football School, where he was coached by Konstantin Beskov. As a youth, he played many positions, including forward and goalkeeper, though by his professional career he played mainly as a defender.

In 1958, Shustikov made his debut for the Torpedo Moscow senior team. He ended up spending his entire adult career as a member of Torpedo Moscow, playing for them through 1973. Shustikov was one of the team's leading defensive players during their most successful period. In 1960, he helped them to both the Soviet Cup and Soviet Top League championships, which was the fourth time in history a team won both in a season. The next year, they were runner-up in both competitions. Three seasons later, Shustikov helped them to another appearance in the Top League championship, with Torpedo losing the match in extra time. He won the Soviet Top League title for a second time in 1965 and later won the Soviet Cup in 1968 and 1972.

Shustikov served as Torpedo's captain from 1968 until 1972. He was named to the list of the league's top players six times: in 1959, 1960, 1961, 1963, 1964 and 1965, including first-team all-league honors in 1963 and 1964. He was also named national footballer of the year in 1963 and 1964. He finished his career having appeared in a total of 427 matches for Torpedo, a team record. This also stood as the second-highest number of matches played in Soviet Top League history, only behind Oleg Blokhin. Of his 427 matches, he played the entirety of the match in 253, which stands as a record.

During his career, Shustikov was known for his modesty, never giving interviews.

== International career ==
Shustikov played for a Soviet youth national team at a tournament in Belgium in 1958, winning the event. He played for the USSR national team for the first time in 1963, in a draw to Hungary. He was a member of the Soviet team at the 1964 European Nations' Cup, playing all 90 minutes in both the semifinals, a win against Denmark, and the finals, a loss to Spain. In total, he appeared in eight matches for the national team.

== Managerial career, personal life and death ==
After his playing career, Shustikov worked as a manager, working as an assistant coach at Torpedo from 1974 to 1980. He coached Volgar Astrakhan in 1983 but then returned to Torpedo the following year, working with their youth teams. Among players he coached in this position was Sergei Ignashevich. He worked as a scout for Torpedo-ZIL Moscow in 2003 and thereafter worked as a consultant for FC Moscow while being honorary president of Torpedo-ZIL Moscow.

Shustikov wrote a book on his life, titled Football for Life (Футбол на всю жизнь, Futbol na vsyu zhizn). He held the title Honored Master of Sports of the USSR from 1964 and was awarded the Medal of the Order "For Merit to the Fatherland", second degree, in 1997. He had a son, Sergei Shustikov, who played for Torpedo and later worked as a coach until his death in 2016. His grandson, Sergei Shustikov Jr., also played for Torpedo. Shustikov died in October 2025, at the age of 86. (Note: Some sources mislabel his age as "87".) At the time of his death, he was the last surviving member of Torpedo's 1960 championship team.

== Honours ==
Torpedo Moscow

- Soviet Top League: 1960, 1965; runner-up 1961, 1964; bronze 1968
- Soviet Cup: 1960, 1968, 1972

Individual

- Top 33 players year-end list: 1959, 1960, 1961, 1963, 1964, 1965
