= Leif Nielsen =

Danish footballer (1942–2026)

Personal information
- Full name: Leif Bernhard Nielsen
- Date of birth: 28 May 1942
- Place of birth: Copenhagen, Denmark
- Date of death: 11 June 2026 (aged 84)
- Place of death: Skovlunde, Denmark
- Position: Goalkeeper

Senior career*
Years	Team	Apps	(Gls)
1961–1967	BK Frem	164	(0)
1968	Houston Stars	30	(0)
1969–1971	Greenock Morton	54	(0)
Total		248	(0)

International career
1960	Denmark U19	2	(0)
1963	Denmark U21	1	(0)
1964–1967	Denmark	28	(0)

Managerial career
- Hero
- 1978–1979: Brønshøj
- * Club domestic league appearances and goals

Leif Bernhard Nielsen (28 May 1942 – 11 June 2026) was a Danish footballer who played as a goalkeeper.

== Career ==
Nielsen played for BK Frem in Denmark, and is regarded as one of the club's greatest players of all time. He was named the 1966 Danish Player of the Year. In 1968, he played for the Houston Stars of the North American Soccer League before finishing his career with Scottish club Greenock Morton. At international level, he played 28 games for the Denmark national team, participating in the 1964 European Championship.

== Death ==
Nielsen died in Skovlunde on 11 June 2026, at the age of 84. Towards the end of his life he suffered from dementia, and spent his last nine months in a care home in the city.

== Honours ==
- Danish Player of the Year: 1966
