= Antal Szentmihályi =

Hungarian footballer

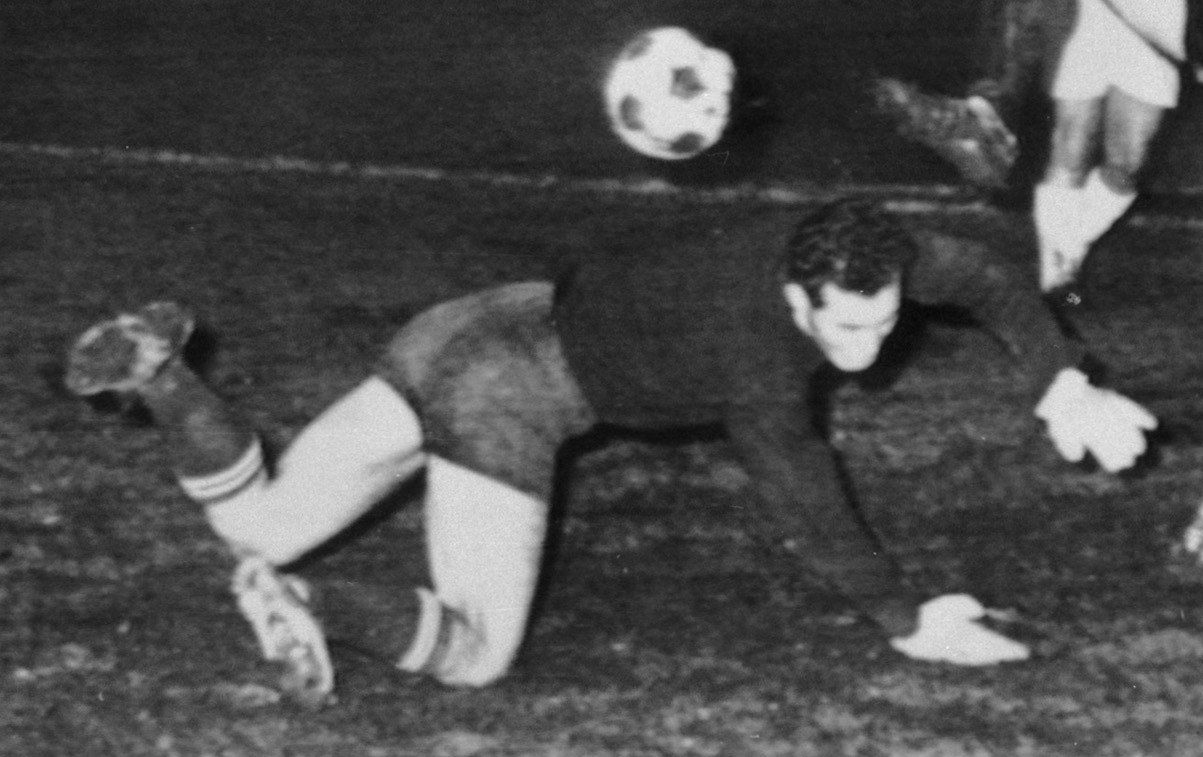
- Antal Szentmihályi concedes a goal to Feyenoord's Piet Kruiver, 1962

Personal information
- Date of birth: 13 June 1939 (age 87)
- Place of birth: Győr, Hungary
- Position: Goalkeeper

Senior career*
Years	Team	Apps	(Gls)
1958–1959	Győri ETO		
1959–1964	Vasas		
1965–1974	Újpest		

International career
1961–1969	Hungary	31	(0)

Managerial career
- 1977–1979: Székesfehérvári MÁV Előre
- 1979–1980: Tatabánya
- 1980: MTK
- 1981–1982: Videoton
- 1982–1983: BVSC Budapest
- 1983–1984: Al-Shabab
- 1984–1986: Al Jahra
- 1987–1988: Kecskeméti SC
- 1988–1990: Tatabánya
- 1991–1992: Al Taawon
- 1993: Club Valencia
- 1994: Diósgyőri VTK
Medal record
Men's football
Representing Hungary
Olympic Games
Gold medal – first place	1964 Tokyo	Team competition
Bronze medal – third place	1960 Rome	Team competition
- * Club domestic league appearances and goals

Antal Szentmihályi (born 13 June 1939) is a former Hungarian footballer. He played for Győri ETO, Vasas SC and Újpesti Dózsa as a goalkeeper. He played 31 games for the Hungary national football team. Szentmihályi is most famous for his participation in the gold medal-winning Hungarian team in the 1964 Olympic Games, and for playing in the 1962 and 1966 FIFA World Cup, and the 1964 European Nations' Cup. He retired in 1977.
