= Eduard Mudrik =

Soviet Russian footballer

Personal information
- Full name: Eduard Nikolayevich Mudrik
- Date of birth: 18 July 1939
- Place of birth: Starobilsk, Ukrainian SSR
- Date of death: 27 March 2017 (aged 77)
- Place of death: Moscow, Russia
- Height: 1.79 m (5 ft 10 1/2 in)
- Position: Defender

Youth career
- Vympel Kaliningrad
- FC Dynamo Moscow

Senior career*
Years	Team	Apps	(Gls)
1957–1968	FC Dynamo Moscow	172	(5)

International career
1963–1964	USSR	8	(1)
Medal record
Representing Soviet Union
UEFA European Championship
Runner-up	1964 Spain
- * Club domestic league appearances and goals

Eduard Nikolayevich Mudrik (Russian: Эдуард Николаевич Мудрик; 18 July 1939 – 27 March 2017) was a Soviet footballer of Jewish ethnicity.

== Honours ==
- Soviet Top League winner: 1959, 1963.
- 1964 European Nations' Cup runner-up.

== International career ==
He earned 8 caps for the USSR national football team, and participated in the 1964 European Nations' Cup, where the Soviets were the runners-up.
