= Kaj Hansen (footballer, born 1940) =

Danish footballer

Personal information
- Full name: Kaj Hansen
- Date of birth: 16 August 1940
- Place of birth: Copenhagen, Denmark
- Date of death: 2 July 2009 (aged 68)
- Place of death: Sweden
- Position: Defender

Youth career
- Boldklubben Frem

Senior career*
| Years | Team | Apps | (Gls) |
| 1960–1967 | Boldklubben Frem | 193 | (20) |
| 1968 | Washington Whips | | |
- Helsingborgs IF
- Fagersta

International career
| 1961–1962 | Denmark U-21 | 5 | (0) |
| 1963–1967 | Denmark | 7 | (0) |
- * Club domestic league appearances and goals

Kaj Hansen (16 August 1940 – 2 July 2009) was a Danish former footballer, who spent the majority of his career with Boldklubben Frem. He played seven games for the Denmark national football team, and represented his country at the 1964 UEFA European Football Championship. He was born in Copenhagen and died in Sweden.
