= Viktor Anichkin =

Russian footballer (1941–1975)

Personal information
- Full name: Viktor Ivanovich Anichkin
- Date of birth: 8 December 1941
- Place of birth: Sverdlovsk, USSR
- Date of death: 5 January 1975 (aged 33)
- Place of death: Moscow, USSR
- Height: 1.78 m (5 ft 10 in)
- Position: Defender

Youth career
- Avangard Moscow
- FShM Moscow

Senior career*
| Years | Team | Apps | (Gls) |
| 1960–1972 | Dynamo Moscow | 282 | (9) |
| 1972 | Dynamo Bryansk | 14 | (2) |
| Total | | 296 | (11) |

International career
| 1964–1968 | USSR | 20 | (1) |
Medal record
Representing Soviet Union
UEFA European Championship
| Runner-up | 1964 Spain |
- * Club domestic league appearances and goals

Viktor Ivanovich Anichkin (Russian: Виктор Иванович Аничкин; 8 December 1941 – 5 January 1975) was a Russian footballer. A defender, he scored 15 goals from 322 matches in all competitions for Dynamo Moscow, of which 6 goals came from 282 league matches. He also played for Dynamo Bryansk.

== International career ==
Anichkin earned 20 caps for the USSR national team, and participated in the 1964 European Nations' Cup, where the Soviets were the runners-up, and also four years later in UEFA Euro 1968.

== Honours ==
Dynamo Moscow

- Soviet Top League: 1963; runner-up 1967, 1970
- Soviet Cup: 1967, 1970
- UEFA Cup Winners' Cup finalist: 1972

Individual

- Top 33 players year-end list: 1964, 1966, 1967, 1968, 1970
