= István Nagy (footballer, born 1939) =

Hungarian footballer

Personal information
- Full name: István Nagy
- Date of birth: 14 April 1939
- Place of birth: Hungary
- Date of death: 22 October 1999 (aged 60)

Senior career*
Years	Team	Apps	(Gls)
- MTK Budapest

International career
	Hungary	22	(0)
- * Club domestic league appearances and goals

István Nagy (14 April 1939 – 22 October 1999) was a Hungarian footballer. He was born in Budapest. During his club career he played for MTK Hungária FC. For the Hungary national football team, he participated in the 1962 FIFA World Cup, the 1964 European Nations' Cup, and the 1966 FIFA World Cup.
