= Bent Wolmar =

Danish footballer (1937–2024)

Personal information
- Date of birth: 8 August 1937
- Place of birth: Fredericia, Denmark
- Date of death: 6 September 2024 (aged 87)
- Position: Defender

Senior career*
Years	Team	Apps	(Gls)
- AGF

International career
1962	Denmark B	2	(0)
1964	Denmark	6	(0)
- * Club domestic league appearances and goals

Bent Wolmar (8 August 1937 – 6 September 2024) was a Danish footballer who played as a defender. During his club career he played for AGF. He earned six caps for the Denmark national team, and was in the finals squad for the 1964 European Nations' Cup. Wolmar died on 6 September 2024, at the age of 87.
