= Feliciano Rivilla =

Spanish footballer (1936–2017)

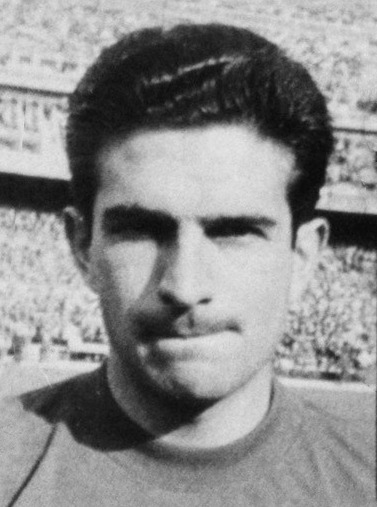
- Rivilla in 1962

Personal information
- Full name: Feliciano Muñoz Rivilla
- Date of birth: 21 August 1936
- Place of birth: Ávila, Spain
- Date of death: 6 November 2017 (aged 81)
- Place of death: Madrid, Spain
- Height: 1.70 m (5 ft 7 in)
- Position: Right-back

Youth career
- Ávila

Senior career*
Years	Team	Apps	(Gls)
1952–1953	Ávila		
1953–1954	Murcia	11	(0)
1954–1968	Atlético Madrid	248	(4)
1955–1956	→ Plus Ultra (loan)	26	(14)
1956–1958	→ Rayo Vallecano (loan)	71	(11)
Total		352	(29)

International career
1959	Spain U21	1	(0)
1960–1965	Spain	26	(0)
Medal record
Representing Spain
European Nations' Cup
Winner	1964 Spain
- * Club domestic league appearances and goals

Feliciano Muñoz Rivilla (21 August 1936 – 6 November 2017) was a Spanish professional footballer who played as a right-back.

He spent the better part of his 16-year senior career with Atlético Madrid, playing 356 competitive games and scoring seven goals. He won four major honours with that club, including the 1965–66 La Liga.

A Spain international in the 60s, Rivilla represented the nation in two World Cups and the 1964 European Championship, winning the latter tournament.

== Club career ==
Born in Ávila, Castile and León, Rivilla started playing football with local Real Ávila CF, moving to Real Murcia CF from Segunda División at the age of 17. At the end of the season he signed with La Liga club Atlético Madrid, who them loaned him for three years to Plus Ultra and Rayo Vallecano, with both teams hailing from the Community of Madrid and competing in the second tier and where he featured mostly as a winger.

Rivilla played his first top-flight match with Atlético on 21 September 1958, in a 4–2 away loss against Valencia CF. He scored his first league goal the following 1 February, in a 3–3 away draw with Sevilla FC.

Already reconverted to a right back, Rivilla was an undisputed starter for the Colchoneros in the following years, notably winning two Copa del Generalísimo trophies and the 1966 national championship, contributing one goal from 24 appearances to the latter conquest. Additionally, he featured in nine games in the team's victorious campaign in the UEFA Cup Winners' Cup of 1961–62.

After having Pelé and Santos FC appear at his testimonial match in September 1969, one year after retiring at 32, Rivilla went on to work in home appliance and act as president of Atlético's veterans association.

== International career ==
Rivilla won 26 caps for the Spain national team over five years, his debut coming on 10 July 1960 in a 3–1 away friendly win against Peru. He only played once in the 1962 FIFA World Cup due to a foot fracture, but was the starter when the country won the 1964 European Nations' Cup held on home soil.

Rivilla was again selected to the 1966 World Cup, being an unused squad member in England. He also took part in the under-21 side's first-ever game, against Italy in 1959.

== Death and personal life ==
Rivilla died on 6 November 2017 at the age of 81, in Madrid. His grandson, Álvaro Muñoz, played professional basketball.

== Honours ==
Atlético Madrid

- La Liga: 1965–66
- Copa del Generalísimo: 1959–60, 1960–61, 1964–65
- UEFA Cup Winners' Cup: 1961–62

Spain

- UEFA European Championship: 1964

Individual

- UEFA European Championship Team of the Tournament: 1964
