= Ferran Olivella =

Spanish footballer (1936–2023)

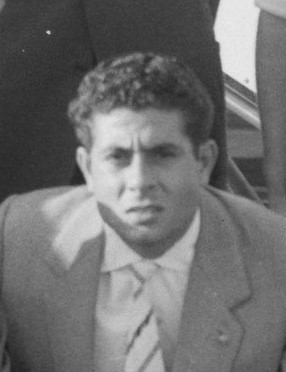
- Olivella in 1960

Personal information
- Full name: Ferran Olivella Pons
- Date of birth: 22 June 1936
- Place of birth: Barcelona, Spain
- Date of death: 14 May 2023 (aged 86)
- Place of death: Spain
- Height: 1.74 m (5 ft 9 in)
- Position: Defender

Youth career
- Poble Sec
- 1953–1954: Barcelona

Senior career*
Years	Team	Apps	(Gls)
1954–1956	España Industrial	17	(0)
1956–1969	Barcelona	214	(1)
Total		231	(1)

International career
1953–1954	Spain U18	8	(0)
1955	Spain amateur	3	(0)
1956–1958	Spain B	6	(0)
1957–1965	Spain	18	(0)
1966–1968	Catalonia	2	(0)
Medal record
Representing Spain
European Nations' Cup
Winner	1964 Spain
UEFA European Under-18 Championship
Winner	1954 West Germany
- * Club domestic league appearances and goals

Ferran Olivella Pons (22 June 1936 – 14 May 2023) was a Spanish footballer who played as a defender.

== Club career ==
Born in Barcelona, Catalonia, Olivella joined FC Barcelona's youth ranks at the age of 17. He started playing as a senior with neighbouring SD España Industrial in the Segunda División, returning to the Camp Nou in 1956.

Olivella appeared in 320 competitive games during his spell with his main club. He won back-to-back La Liga championships from 1958 to 1960, scoring his only goal as a professional on 14 February 1960 in an 8–0 home demolition of UD Las Palmas.

== International career ==
Olivella earned 18 caps for the Spain national team in eight years. He made his debut on 31 March 1957, in a 5–0 friendly win against Belgium.

When the country won the 1964 European Nations' Cup, Olivella acted as captain. He was also selected for the 1966 FIFA World Cup held in England, being an unused squad member in an eventual group-stage exit.

== Death ==
Olivella died on 14 May 2023, at the age of 86.

== Honours ==
Barcelona

- La Liga: 1958–59, 1959–60
- Copa del Generalísimo: 1957, 1958–59, 1962–63, 1967–68
- Inter-Cities Fairs Cup: 1955–58, 1958–60, 1965–66
- Small Club World Cup: 1957

Spain

- UEFA European Championship: 1964

Spain U18

- UEFA European Under-18 Championship: 1954

Individual

- UEFA European Championship Team of the Tournament: 1964

Preceded by Igor Netto; Soviet Union	UEFA European Championship; Winning Captain; 1964	Succeeded by Giacinto Facchetti; Italy
