= Dezső Novák =

Hungarian footballer

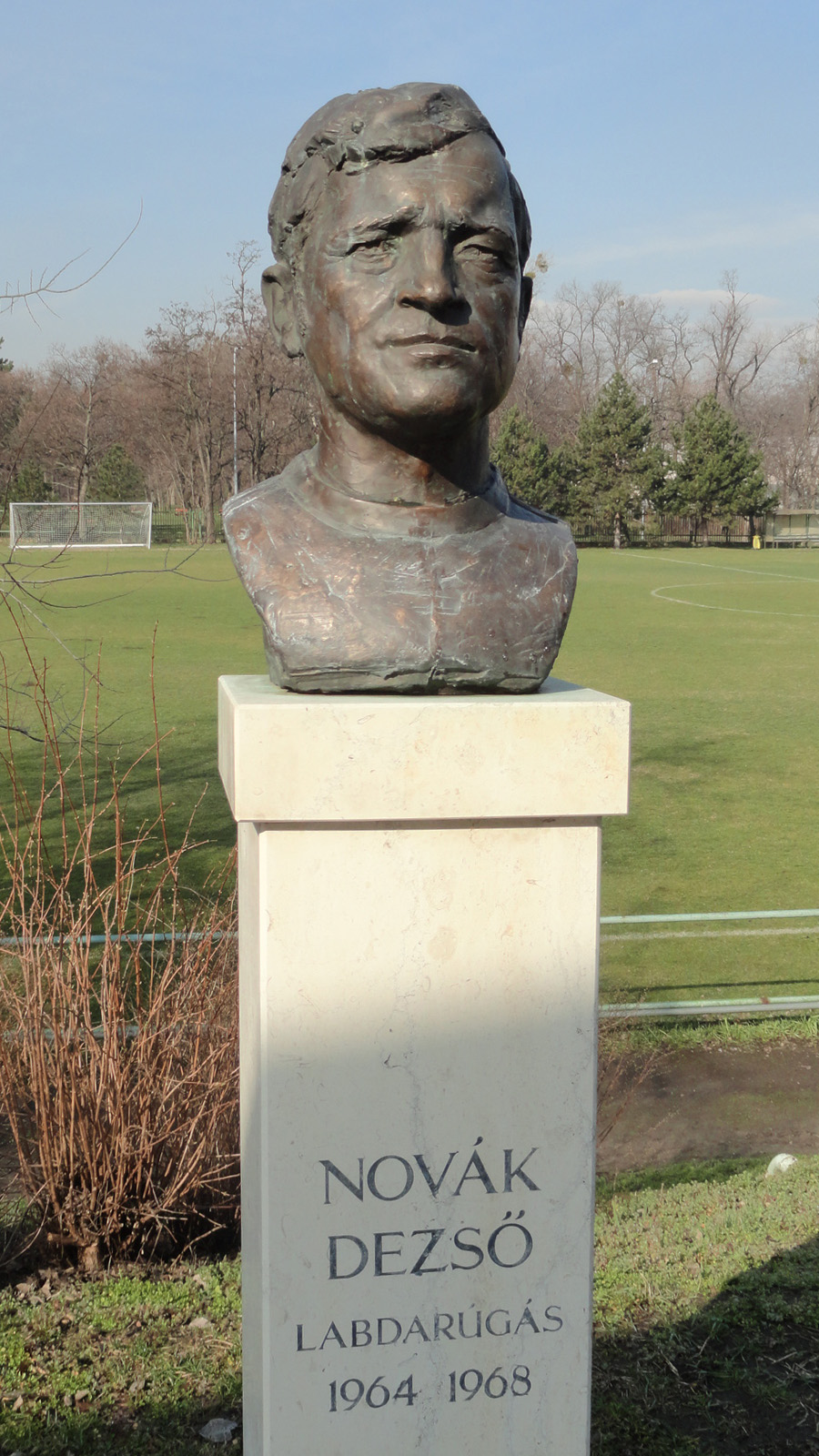

Personal information
- Date of birth: 3 February 1939
- Place of birth: Ják, Hungary
- Date of death: 26 February 2014 (aged 75)
- Position: Defender

Senior career*
Years	Team	Apps	(Gls)
1955	Szombathelyi Postás		
1956–1961	Szombathelyi Haladás		
1961–1972	Ferencváros		

International career
1959–1968	Hungary	9	(3)

Managerial career
- 1973: Ferencváros
- 1976–1980: Dunaújvárosi Kohász
- 1980–1983: Ferencváros
- 1984–1985: Bajai SC
- 1985–1986: Volán
- 1987–1988: Szombathelyi Haladás
- 1994–1996: Ferencváros
- 1997: Al-Ittihad
Medal record
Men's football
Representing Hungary
Olympic Games
Bronze medal – third place	1960 Rome	Team competition
Gold medal – first place	1964 Tokyo	Team competition
Gold medal – first place	1968 Mexico City	Team competition
- * Club domestic league appearances and goals

Dezső Novák (3 February 1939 – 26 February 2014) was a Hungarian footballer who played as a defender, and also a football manager.

During his club career he played for Ferencvárosi TC. For the Hungary national team, he participated in the 1964 European Nations' Cup. In three Olympic Games, he also won two gold medals in 1964 and 1968, and a bronze medal in 1960.

Later he served as the head coach of Ferencvaros in 1973.

In 2004, he received the Hungarian Order of Merit Officer's Cross.

Novák died on 26 February 2014, at age 75.

== Honours ==
Hungary

- Olympic Games: 1964, 1968, third place: 1960

Individual

- UEFA European Championship Team of the Tournament: 1964
