= Viktor Ponedelnik =

Russian footballer and manager (1937–2020)

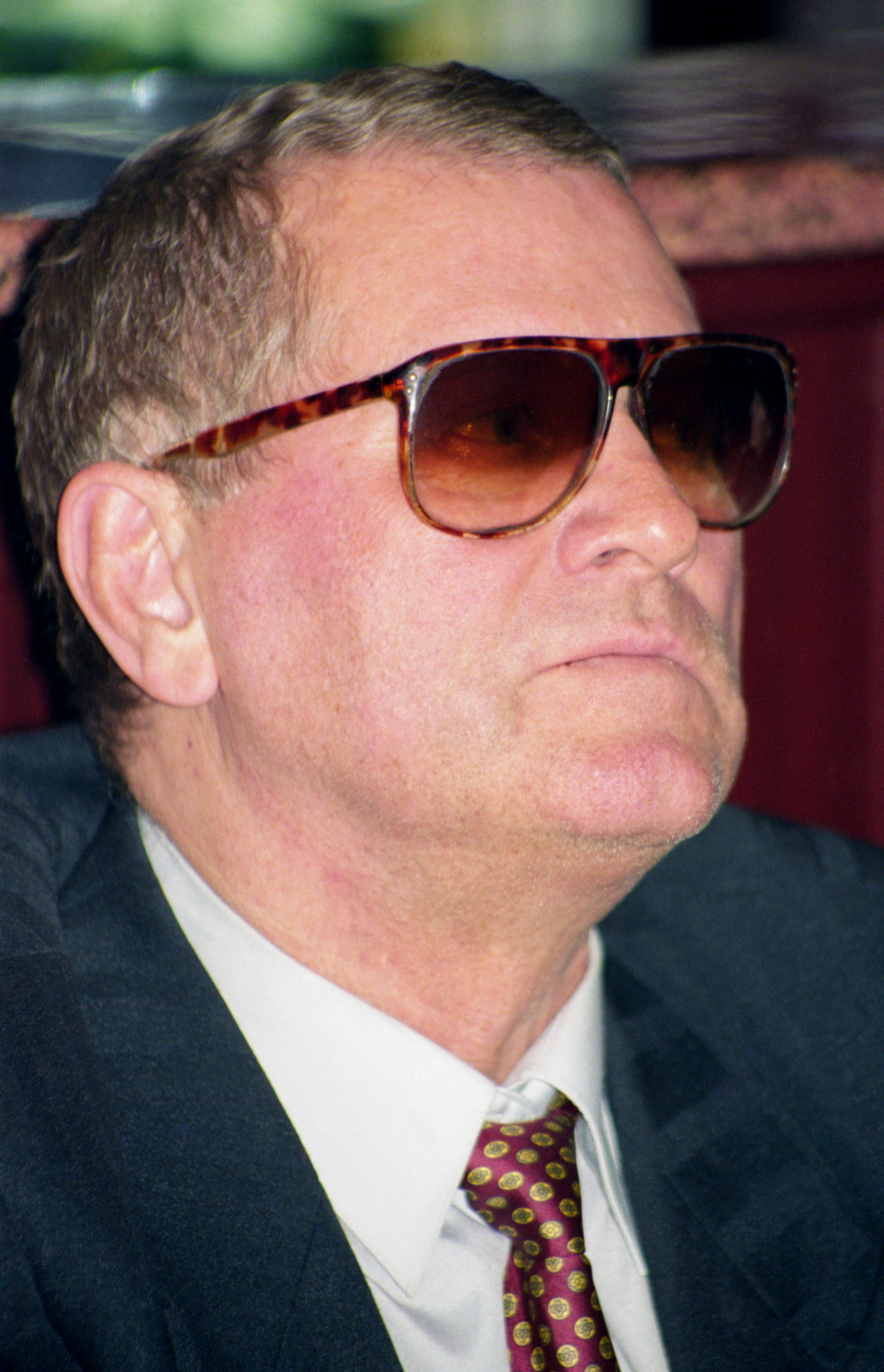
- Ponedelnik in 1998

Personal information
- Full name: Viktor Vladimirovich Ponedelnik
- Date of birth: 22 May 1937
- Place of birth: Rostov-on-Don, Russian SFSR, Soviet Union
- Date of death: 5 December 2020 (aged 83)
- Place of death: Moscow, Russia
- Height: 1.80 m (5 ft 11 in)
- Position: Striker

Youth career
- Burevestnik Rostov-on-Don
- Rostov Military College

Senior career*
Years	Team	Apps	(Gls)
1956–1958	Torpedo/Rostselmash	50	(31)
1959–1960	FC SKA Rostov-on-Don	45	(17)
1961	CSKA Moscow		
1961–1965	SKA Rostov-on-Don	111	(37)
1966	FC Spartak Moscow		

International career
1960–1964	Soviet Union	29	(20)

Managerial career
- 1969: Rostselmash Rostov-on-Don
Medal record
Representing Soviet Union
UEFA European Championship
Winner	1960 France
Runner-up	1964 Spain
- * Club domestic league appearances and goals

Viktor Vladimirovich Ponedelnik (Russian: Виктор Владимирович Понедельник, 22 May 1937 – 5 December 2020) was a Russian footballer and manager, who played for the Soviet Union national team.

== Biography ==
Ponedelnik first started playing for a local team, Rostselmash, in 1956. In 1958, he switched to SKA Rostov-on-Don and was invited to join the Soviet national team. In the 1960 European Championship, the only major Championship ever won by the Soviet Union, Ponedelnik headed home the winning goal in extra time in the final game against Yugoslavia. Ponedelnik retired in 1966 after gaining weight and undergoing surgery for appendicitis. He scored 20 (according to some accounts, 21) goals in 29 games for his country.

In later years, Ponedelnik worked as a coach, a sports journalist, an editor of a sports publication, and an advisor to the President of the Russian Federation. Later, a journalist, editor, and in-chief of the weekly Football. He received numerous awards for his contribution to Soviet and Russian sport. He was married and had three children and four grandchildren.

In Rostov-on-Don at the stadium, Olimp-2 28 August 2015 a monument depicting a young Ponedelnik with the cup in his hands.

Ponedelnik died on 5 December 2020 at the age of 83. He was the last surviving member of the 1960 European Nations' Cup winning squad of Soviet Union, that became the inaugural European Champions at international level.

== Honours ==
USSR

- UEFA European Championship: 1960, runner-up: 1964

Individual

- The best 33 football players of the Soviet Union (5): No. 1 (1960-1963); No. 3 (1959)
- UEFA European Championship: Golden Boot / Team of the Tournament 1960
- Honored Master of Sports
- Order of the Badge of Honour: 1980
- Order of Friendship: 1997
- Cavalier of the Order of the Ruby League For Merit: 2009
- Order For Services to the Rostov Oblast: 2013

== Books ==
- My Love, Football (1970)
- Penalty Area (1977)
- Ball, the Gate (1980)
- Confessions of a Central Striker (1987)
