= Galimzyan Khusainov =

Soviet footballer (1937–2010)

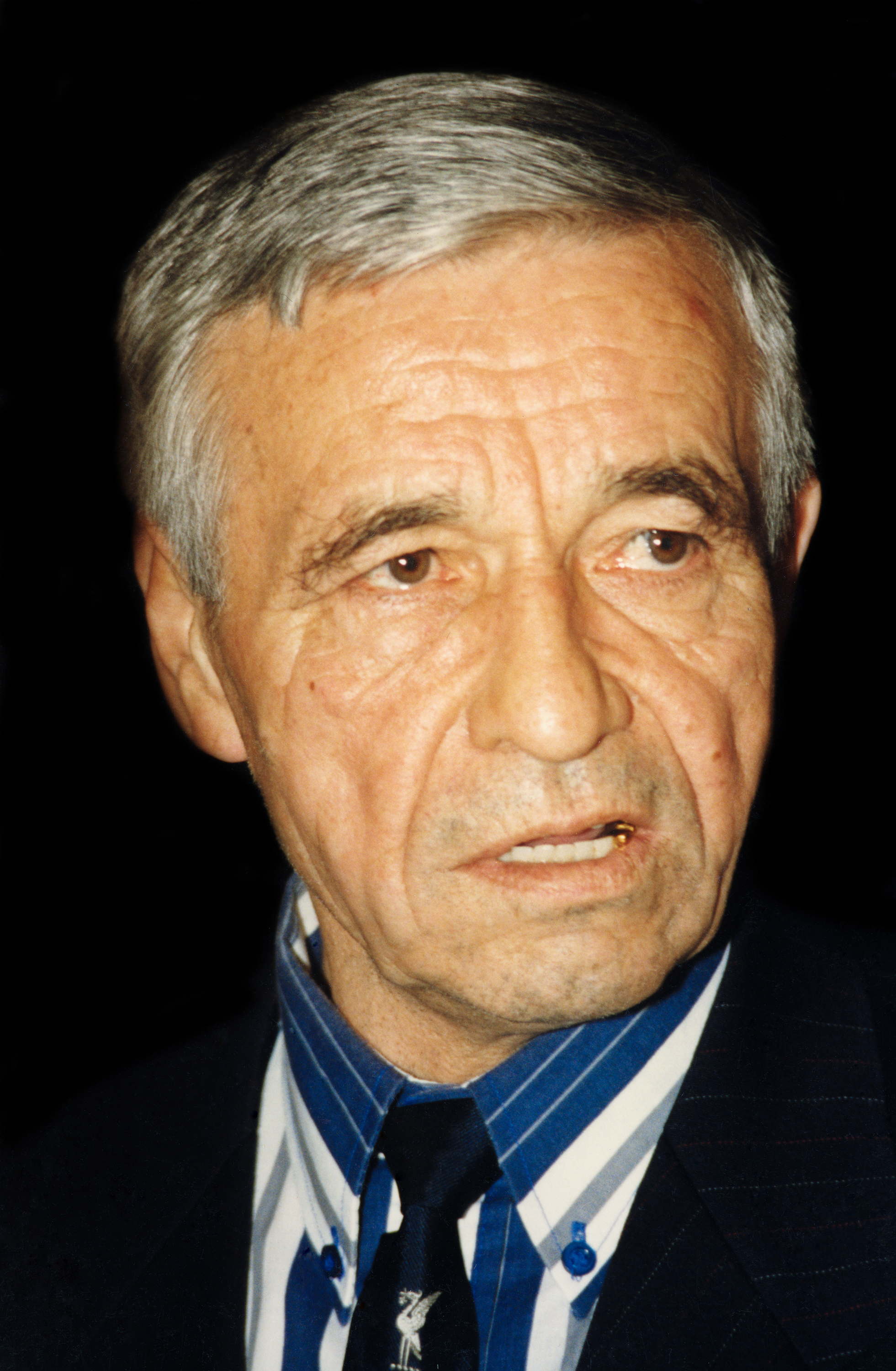

Personal information
- Full name: Galimzyan Salikhovich Khusainov
- Date of birth: 27 June 1937
- Place of birth: Novoye Ishlaikino, Russian SFSR
- Date of death: 5 February 2010 (aged 72)
- Place of death: Moscow, Russia
- Height: 1.63 m (5 ft 4 in)
- Position: Striker

Youth career
- Dynamo Kuibyshev

Senior career*
Years	Team	Apps	(Gls)
1957–1960	Krylia Sovetov Kuibyshev	64	(13)
1961–1973	Spartak Moscow	350	(102)
Total		414	(115)

International career
1960–1966	USSR	33	(4)

Managerial career
- 1974: Spartak Nalchik (assistant)
- 1975: Soviet Union U17 (assistant)
- 1976: Spartak Moscow (assistant)
- 1980–1982: Pakhtakor Tashkent (assistant)
Medal record
Representing Soviet Union
UEFA European Championship
Runner-up	1964 Spain
- * Club domestic league appearances and goals

Galimzyan Salikhovich Khusainov (Tatar: Галимҗан Салих улы Хөсәенев, Russian: Галимзян Салихович Хусаинов) (27 June 1937 – 5 February 2010) was a Soviet footballer who played as a striker.

== International career ==
Khusainov played for the Soviet Union national team scoring 4 goals in 33 appearances. He was a participant at the 1962 FIFA World Cup, 1966 FIFA World Cup and at the 1964 European Nations' Cup, where the Soviet Union squad won the silver medal and he scored a goal in the final.

== Honours ==
Spartak Moscow

- Soviet Top League: 1962, 1969
- Soviet Cup: 1963, 1965, 1971

Soviet Union

- European Nations' Cup runner-up: 1964

Individual

- Grigory Fedotov club member
