= Chus Pereda =

Spanish footballer (1938–2011)

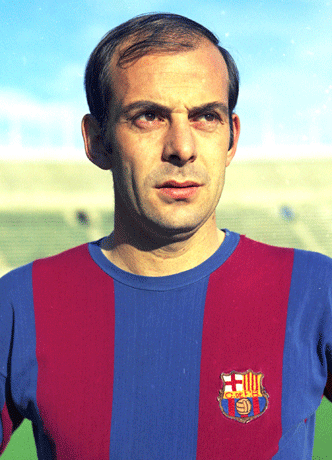
- Pereda with Barcelona

Personal information
- Full name: Jesús María Pereda Ruiz de Temiño
- Date of birth: 15 June 1938
- Place of birth: Medina de Pomar, Spain
- Date of death: 27 September 2011 (aged 73)
- Place of death: Barcelona, Spain
- Height: 1.70 m (5 ft 7 in)
- Position: Midfielder

Youth career
- Alcázar
- Balmaseda

Senior career*
Years	Team	Apps	(Gls)
1956–1958	Indautxu	52	(26)
1958–1959	Real Madrid	2	(1)
1958–1959	→ Valladolid (loan)	27	(9)
1959–1961	Sevilla	56	(13)
1961–1969	Barcelona	134	(42)
1969–1970	Sabadell	5	(0)
1970–1972	Mallorca	53	(7)
Total		329	(98)

International career
1960	Spain U21	2	(0)
1960	Spain B	1	(0)
1960–1968	Spain	15	(6)
1966–1968	Catalan XI	2	(1)

Managerial career
- 1973–1975: Catalonia (youth)
- 1976–1993: Spain U18
- 1977–1991: Spain U20
- 1979–1992: Spain U19
- 1980: Spain U16
- 1987–1988: Spain U16
- 1987–1990: Spain U17
- 1988–1992: Spain U21
- 1995–1996: Xerez
- 1998: Castile and León
Medal record
Representing Spain
European Nations' Cup
Winner	1964 Spain
- * Club domestic league appearances and goals

Jesús María Pereda Ruiz de Temiño (15 June 1938 – 27 September 2011), also known as Chus Pereda, was a Spanish football midfielder and manager.

In a 16-year professional career, he played mainly for Barcelona, amassing La Liga totals of 197 matches and 55 goals for four teams – including Real Madrid. In 1964 he helped Spain win the European Championship, being an international throughout the decade.

After retiring, Pereda was in charge of several Spain youth teams, including the under-20 and the under-21 teams.

== Club career ==
Although born in Medina de Pomar, Province of Burgos, Castile and León, Pereda was raised in Balmaseda in Biscay, and, as a schoolboy, he captained the provincial U-16 team. He began his senior career with Bilbao club SD Indautxu, where his teammates included veteran goalkeeper Raimundo Lezama and Miguel Jones – Pereda and Jones, and later a third player, José Eulogio Gárate, were all controversially rejected by Athletic Bilbao because of their birthplaces, with Pereda moving to Real Madrid and the others to Atlético Madrid.

With the Merengues, Pereda only appeared in two La Liga games, scoring once in a 3–0 home win against Real Zaragoza as the team won the national championship. During his spell in the Spanish capital, he was also loaned to Real Valladolid in Segunda División – after falling out with coach Luis Carniglia– returning to the top flight with Sevilla FC and netting 11 goals in his first season.

Pereda joined FC Barcelona in summer 1961, going on to appear in 293 competitive matches during eight years (104 goals). During that time he won the Copa del Generalísimo twice, scoring the opening goal in the 1963 final, a 3–1 victory over Zaragoza at the Camp Nou.

Aged 31, Pereda left Barcelona and joined Catalonia neighbours CE Sabadell FC, appearing rarely during the top flight season. He closed out his career after two second level campaigns with RCD Mallorca.

In 1995–96, Pereda had his first and only head coaching experience at club level, leading Xerez CD to the 11th position in Segunda División B.

== International career ==
Pereda scored six goals in 15 appearances for Spain, during eight years. His debut was on 15 May 1960 in a 3–0 friendly win with England, at the Santiago Bernabéu Stadium.

Two of Pereda's international goals came at the 1964 European Nations' Cup, in which he appeared alongside Barcelona teammate Josep Maria Fusté. He scored in both the semi-final against Hungary and the final against the Soviet Union, as the national team won the tournament on home soil; in the decisive match he also assisted Marcelino in the 2–1 winner, although No-Do newsreels showed Amancio as the author of the pass.

During 15 years, Pereda managed both the Spain under-20 and under-21 teams, leading the former to the second place in the 1985 FIFA World Championship in the Soviet Union. In 1988, he was in charge of the Castile and León autonomous side for one game, a 1–1 draw with Aragon. Four years later, he replaced Vicente Miera at the helm of the Spain senior team for one match – he worked in his coaching staff as assistant – due to illness.

== Death ==
Pereda died in Barcelona on 27 September 2011 at the age of 73, from cancer.

== Career statistics ==
Scores and results list Spain's goal tally first, score column indicates score after each Pereda goal.

List of international goals scored by Chus Pereda
No.	Date	Venue	Opponent	Score	Result	Competition
1	17 July 1960	Nacional, Santiago, Chile	Chile	3–0	4–1	Friendly
2	17 June 1964	Santiago Bernabéu, Madrid, Spain	Hungary	1–0	2–1	1964 European Nations' Cup
3	21 June 1964	Santiago Bernabéu, Madrid, Spain	Soviet Union	1–0	2–1	1964 European Nations' Cup
4	27 October 1965	Sánchez Pizjuán, Seville, Spain	Republic of Ireland	1–1	4–1	1966 FIFA World Cup qualification
5	27 October 1965	Sánchez Pizjuán, Seville, Spain	Republic of Ireland	2–1	4–1	1966 FIFA World Cup qualification
6	27 October 1965	Sánchez Pizjuán, Seville, Spain	Republic of Ireland	3–1	4–1	1966 FIFA World Cup qualification

== Honours ==
=== Player ===
Real Madrid

- La Liga: 1957–58
- European Cup: 1957–58

Barcelona

- Copa del Generalísimo: 1962–63, 1967–68
- Inter-Cities Fairs Cup: 1965–66

Spain

- UEFA European Championship: 1964

Individual

- UEFA European Championship: Golden Boot/Team of the Tournament 1964

=== Manager ===
Spain U16

- UEFA European Championship: 1988

Spain U20

- FIFA U-20 World Cup: Runner-up 1985
