= 1964 European Nations' Cup =

Football tournament

Eurocopa España 1964

Tournament details
- Host country: Spain
- Dates: 17–21 June
- Teams: 4
- Venues: 2 (in 2 host cities)

Final positions
- Champions: Spain (1st title)
- Runners-up: Soviet Union
- Third place: Hungary
- Fourth place: Denmark

Tournament statistics
- Matches played: 4
- Goals scored: 13 (3.25 per match)
- Attendance: 156,253 (39,063 per match)
- Top scorer(s): (Hungary) Ferenc Bene (Hungary) Dezső Novák (Spain) Chus Pereda (2 goals each)
- Best player: (Spain) Luis Suárez

The 1964 European Nations' Cup was the second edition of the UEFA European Championship. The final tournament was held in Spain. It was won by the hosts 2–1 over the defending champions, the Soviet Union.

The tournament was a knockout competition; 29 teams entered (Greece withdrew after the draw after refusing to play Albania). The Soviet Union, Austria and Luxembourg received byes to the round of 16. The teams played home-and-away matches until the semi-finals; the final four teams would move on to the final tournament, whose host was selected after the teams became known.

Luxembourg proved to be the giant-killers of the qualifying rounds; they beat the Netherlands 3–2 on aggregate (1–1 and 2–1), and then drew with Denmark 3–3 and 2–2, before losing the replay 1–0. Denmark thus became the most surprising of the qualifiers for the final tournament, joining the Soviet Union, Spain, and Hungary. In the semi-finals, the Soviet Union defeated the Danes 3–0 in Barcelona, and Spain beat Hungary 2–1 in extra time in Madrid, the winning goal being scored by Amancio. This set up a showdown between Spain and the Soviet Union in the final, only four years after Spain had been disqualified for refusing to travel to Moscow to play the Soviet Union. On this occasion – and with the championship of Europe on the line – General Franco let his team play the Soviets. In front of more than 79,000 people, including Franco himself, at the Santiago Bernabéu in Madrid, the hosts won 2–1 after a late goal from Marcelino.

== Qualified teams ==
Team	Qualified as	Qualified on	Previous appearances in tournament (Note: Bold indicates champion for that year.)
Denmark	Quarter-final winner	18 December 1963	0 (debut)
Spain (host)	Quarter-final winner	8 April 1964	0 (debut)
Hungary	Quarter-final winner	23 May 1964	0 (debut)
Soviet Union	Quarter-final winner	27 May 1964	1 (**1960**)

== Venues ==
1964 European Nations' Cup is located in Spain	Madrid	Barcelona
1964 European Nations' Cup is located in Spain	Santiago Bernabéu	Camp Nou
1964 European Nations' Cup is located in Spain	Capacity: **80,000**	Capacity: **105,000**

== Match officials ==
Country	Referee	Matches refereed
Belgium	Arthur Blavier	Semi-final: Spain 2–1 Hungary
England	Arthur Holland	Final: Spain 2–1 Soviet Union
Italy	Concetto Lo Bello	Semi-final: Denmark 0–3 Soviet Union
Switzerland	Daniel Mellet	Third place play-off: Hungary 3–1 Denmark

== Final tournament ==
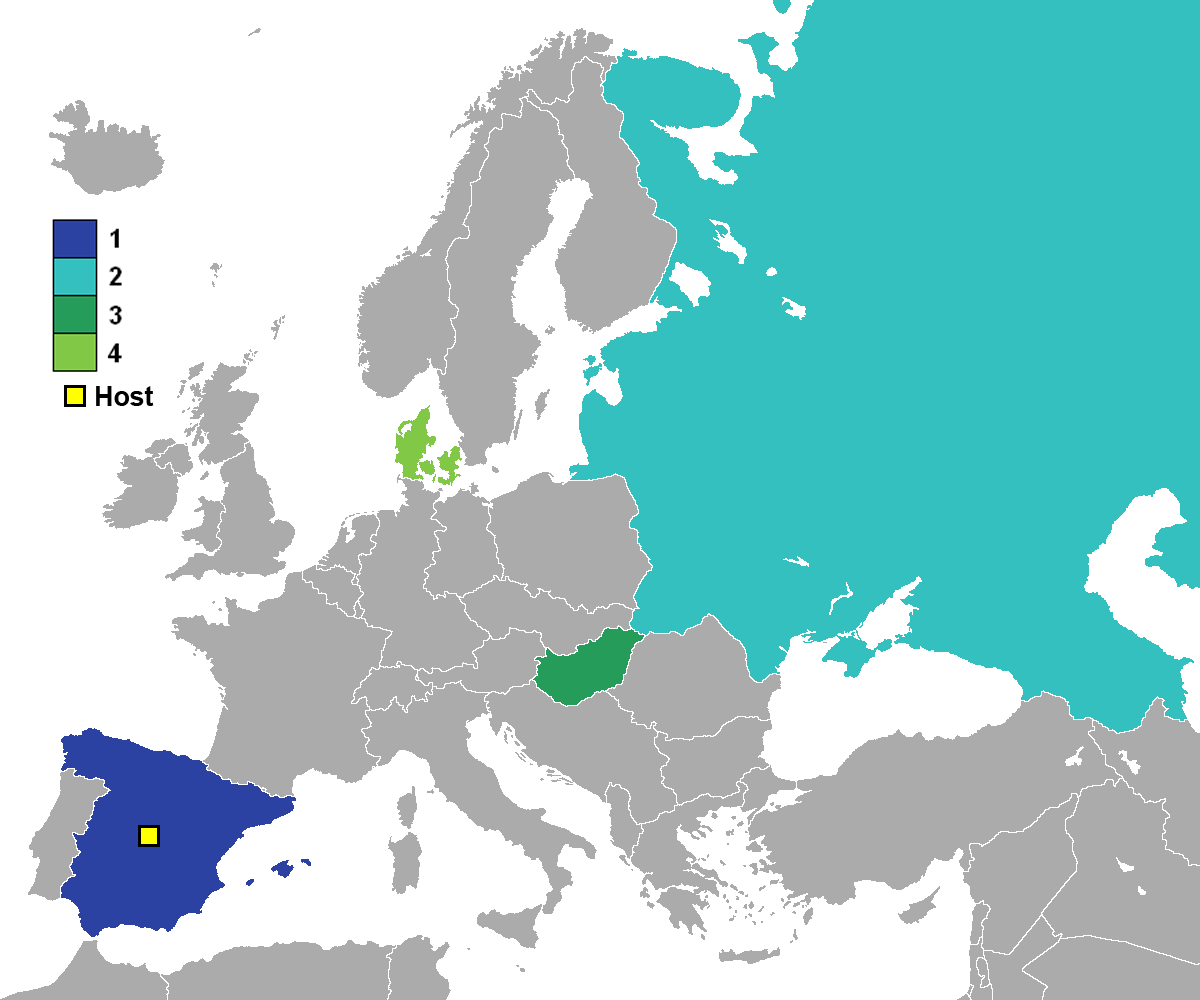
1964 European Nations' Cup finalists.

In all matches but the final, extra time and a coin toss were used to decide the winner if necessary. If the final remained level after extra time, a replay would be used to determine the winner.

All times are local, CET (UTC+1).

=== Bracket ===
Semi-finals
17 June – Madrid
**Spain (a.e.t.)**	**2**
Hungary	1
17 June – Barcelona
Denmark	0
**Soviet Union**	**3**

Final
21 June – Madrid
**Spain**	**2**
Soviet Union	1
Third place play-off
20 June – Barcelona
**Hungary (a.e.t.)**	**3**
Denmark	1

=== Semi-finals ===
17 June 1964
20:00

Spain	2–1 (a.e.t.)	Hungary
Pereda 35'; Amancio 112'	Report	Bene 84'

Santiago Bernabéu, Madrid
Attendance: 34,713
Referee: Arthur Blavier (Belgium)

17 June 1964
22:30

Denmark	0–3	Soviet Union
	Report	Voronin 19'; Ponedelnik 40'; Ivanov 87'

Camp Nou, Barcelona
Attendance: 38,556
Referee: Concetto Lo Bello (Italy)

=== Third place play-off ===
20 June 1964
20:30

Hungary	3–1 (a.e.t.)	Denmark
Bene 11'; Novák 107' (pen.), 110'	Report	Bertelsen 82'

Camp Nou, Barcelona
Attendance: 3,869
Referee: Daniel Mellet (Switzerland)

=== Final ===
21 June 1964
18:30

Spain	2–1	Soviet Union
Pereda 6'; Marcelino 84'	Report, lineups	Khusainov 8'

Santiago Bernabéu, Madrid
Attendance: 79,115
Referee: Arthur Holland (England)

== Statistics ==
=== Goalscorers ===
There were 13 goals scored in 4 matches, for an average of 3.25 goals per match.

2 goals

- (Hungary) Ferenc Bene
- (Hungary) Dezső Novák
- (Spain) Chus Pereda

1 goal

- (Denmark) Carl Bertelsen
- (Soviet Union) Valentin Ivanov
- (Soviet Union) Galimzyan Khusainov
- (Soviet Union) Viktor Ponedelnik
- (Soviet Union) Valery Voronin
- (Spain) Amancio Amaro
- (Spain) Marcelino

=== Awards ===
UEFA Team of the Tournament

Goalkeeper	Defenders	Midfielders	Forwards
(Soviet Union) Lev Yashin	(Hungary) Dezső Novák (Spain) Ferran Olivella (Spain) Feliciano Rivilla (Spain) Ignacio Zoco	(Soviet Union) Valentin Ivanov (Spain) Amancio Amaro (Spain) Luis Suárez	(Hungary) Flórián Albert (Hungary) Ferenc Bene (Spain) Chus Pereda
