= 1960 European Nations' Cup final tournament =

The final tournament of the 1960 European Nations' Cup was a single-elimination tournament involving the four teams that qualified from the quarter-finals. There were two rounds of matches: a semi-final stage leading to the final to decide the champions. The final tournament began with the semi-finals on 6 July and ended with the final on 10 July at the Parc des Princes in Paris. The Soviet Union won the tournament with a 2–1 victory over Yugoslavia.

All times Central European Time (UTC+1)

== Format ==
Any game in the final tournament that was undecided by the end of the regular 90 minutes was followed by thirty minutes of extra time (two 15-minute halves). If scores were still level, a coin toss would be used in all matches but the final. If the final finished level after extra time, a replay would take place at a later date to decide the winner.

== Teams ==
Team	Method of qualification	Date of qualification
Czechoslovakia	Quarter-final winner	27 March 1960
France (host)	Quarter-final winner	22 May 1960
Soviet Union	Quarter-final winner	28 May 1960
Yugoslavia	Quarter-final winner	29 May 1960

== Bracket ==
Semi-finals
6 July – Marseille
Czechoslovakia	0
Soviet Union	3
6 July – Paris
France	4
Yugoslavia	5

Final
10 July – Paris
Soviet Union (a.e.t.)	2
Yugoslavia	1
Third place play-off
9 July – Marseille
Czechoslovakia	2
France	0

== Semi-finals ==
=== France vs Yugoslavia ===
6 July 1960
20:00

France	4–5	Yugoslavia
Vincent 12'; Heutte 43', 62'; Wisniewski 53'	Report	Galić 11'; Žanetić 55'; Knez 75'; Jerković 78', 79'

Parc des Princes, Paris
Attendance: 26,370
Referee: Gaston Grandain (Belgium)

France	Yugoslavia

GK	1	Georges Lamia
RB	2	Jean Wendling
LB	4	Bruno Rodzik
RH	3	Robert Herbin
CH	5	Jean-Jacques Marcel
LH	6	René Ferrier
OR	10	François Heutte (c)
IR	8	Lucien Muller
CF	9	Maryan Wisniewski
IL	7	Michel Stievenard
OL	11	Jean Vincent
Manager:
Albert Batteux

GK	1	Milutin Šoškić
RB	2	Vladimir Durković
LB	3	Fahrudin Jusufi
RH	4	Ante Žanetić
CH	5	Branko Zebec (c)
LH	6	Željko Perušić
OR	7	Tomislav Knez
IR	8	Dražan Jerković
CF	9	Milan Galić
IL	10	Dragoslav Šekularac
OL	11	Bora Kostić
Managers:
Ljubomir Lovrić; Dragomir Nikolić; Aleksandar Tirnanić

=== Czechoslovakia vs Soviet Union ===
6 July 1960
21:30

Czechoslovakia	0–3	Soviet Union
	Report	Ivanov 34', 56'; Ponedelnik 66'

Stade Vélodrome, Marseille
Attendance: 25,184
Referee: Cesare Jonni (Italy)

Czechoslovakia	Soviet Union

GK	1	Viliam Schrojf
RB	2	František Šafránek
LB	3	Ján Popluhár
RH	4	Ladislav Novák (c)
CH	5	Titus Buberník
LH	6	Josef Masopust
OR	7	Josef Vojta
IR	8	Anton Moravčík
CF	9	Andrej Kvašňák
IL	10	Vlastimil Bubník
OL	11	Milan Dolinský
Manager:
Rudolf Vytlačil

GK	1	Lev Yashin
RB	2	Givi Chokheli
LB	4	Anatoly Krutikov
RH	5	Yuriy Voynov
CH	3	Anatoli Maslyonkin
LH	6	Igor Netto (c)
OR	7	Slava Metreveli
IR	9	Viktor Ponedelnik
CF	10	Valentin Bubukin
IL	8	Valentin Ivanov
OL	11	Mikheil Meskhi
Manager:
Gavriil Kachalin

== Third place play-off ==
9 July 1960
21:30

Czechoslovakia	2–0	France
Bubník 58'; Pavlovič 88'	Report

Stade Vélodrome, Marseille
Attendance: 9,438
Referee: Cesare Jonni (Italy)

Czechoslovakia	France

GK	1	Viliam Schrojf
RB	2	František Šafránek
LB	3	Ján Popluhár
RH	4	Ladislav Novák (c)
CH	5	Titus Buberník
LH	6	Josef Masopust
OR	7	Ladislav Pavlovič
IR	8	Josef Vojta
CF	9	Pavol Molnár
IL	10	Vlastimil Bubník
OL	11	Milan Dolinský
Manager:
Rudolf Vytlačil

GK	1	Jean Taillandier
RB	2	Bruno Rodzik
LB	4	André Chorda
RH	5	Jean-Jacques Marcel
CH	3	Robert Jonquet (c)
LH	6	Robert Siatka
OR	7	François Heutte
IR	8	Yvon Douis
CF	9	Maryan Wisniewski
IL	10	Michel Stievenard
OL	11	Jean Vincent
Manager:
Albert Batteux

== Final ==
10 July 1960
20:30

Soviet Union	2–1 (a.e.t.)	Yugoslavia
Metreveli 49'; Ponedelnik 113'	Report	Galić 43'

Parc des Princes, Paris
Attendance: 17,966
Referee: Arthur Ellis (England)

Soviet Union	Yugoslavia

GK	1	Lev Yashin
RB	2	Givi Chokheli
CB	3	Anatoli Maslyonkin
LB	4	Anatoly Krutikov
RH	5	Yuriy Voynov
LH	6	Igor Netto (c)
OR	7	Slava Metreveli
IR	8	Valentin Ivanov
CF	9	Viktor Ponedelnik
IL	10	Valentin Bubukin
OL	11	Mikheil Meskhi
Manager:
Gavriil Kachalin

GK	1	Blagoje Vidinić
RB	2	Vladimir Durković
CB	5	Jovan Miladinović
LB	3	Fahrudin Jusufi
RH	4	Ante Žanetić
LH	6	Željko Perušić
OR	7	Željko Matuš
IR	10	Dragoslav Šekularac
CF	8	Dražan Jerković
IL	9	Milan Galić
OL	11	Bora Kostić (c)
Managers:
Ljubomir Lovrić; Dragomir Nikolić; Aleksandar Tirnanić

== See also ==
- Czech Republic at the UEFA European Championship
- France at the UEFA European Championship
- Slovakia at the UEFA European Championship
- Soviet Union at the UEFA European Championship
- Yugoslavia at the UEFA European Championship
