= 1960 European Nations' Cup squads =

This is a list of squads for the 1960 European Nations' Cup in France, which took place from 6 to 10 July 1960. The players' listed ages are their ages on the tournament's opening day (6 July 1960).

== Czechoslovakia ==
Manager: Rudolf Vytlačil

No.	Pos.	Player	Date of birth (age)	Caps	Club
16	GK	Justín Javorek	14 September 1936 (aged 23)	0	(Czechoslovakia) ČH Bratislava
1	GK	Viliam Schrojf	2 August 1931 (aged 28)	9	(Czechoslovakia) ŠK Slovan Bratislava
6	DF	Ladislav Novák (captain)	5 December 1931 (aged 28)	48	(Czechoslovakia) Dukla Prague
4	DF	Ján Popluhár	12 August 1935 (aged 24)	14	(Czechoslovakia) ŠK Slovan Bratislava
3	DF	František Šafránek	2 January 1931 (aged 29)	15	(Czechoslovakia) Dukla Prague
2	DF	Jiří Tichý	6 December 1933 (aged 26)	7	(Czechoslovakia) ČH Bratislava
24	MF	Titus Buberník	12 October 1933 (aged 26)	10	(Czechoslovakia) ČH Bratislava
10	MF	Josef Masopust	9 February 1931 (aged 29)	30	(Czechoslovakia) Dukla Prague
7	MF	Anton Moravčík	3 June 1931 (aged 29)	24	(Czechoslovakia) ŠK Slovan Bratislava
5	MF	Svatopluk Pluskal	28 October 1930 (aged 29)	28	(Czechoslovakia) Dukla Prague
8	FW	Vlastimil Bubník	18 March 1931 (aged 29)	7	(Czechoslovakia) RH Brno
20	FW	Milan Dolinský	14 July 1935 (aged 24)	6	(Czechoslovakia) ČH Bratislava
11	FW	Andrej Kvašňák	19 May 1936 (aged 24)	1	(Czechoslovakia) Spartak Praha Sokolovo
12	FW	Pavol Molnár	13 February 1936 (aged 24)	19	(Czechoslovakia) ČH Bratislava
14	FW	Ladislav Pavlovič	8 April 1926 (aged 34)	11	(Czechoslovakia) Tatran Prešov
15	FW	Josef Vacenovský	9 July 1937 (aged 22)	0	(Czechoslovakia) Dukla Prague
18	FW	Josef Vojta	19 April 1935 (aged 25)	2	(Czechoslovakia) Spartak Praha Sokolovo

== France ==
Manager: Albert Batteux

No.	Pos.	Player	Date of birth (age)	Caps	Club
	GK	Georges Lamia	14 March 1933 (aged 27)	5	(France) Nice
	GK	Jean Taillandier	22 January 1938 (aged 22)	0	(France) Racing Paris
	DF	André Chorda	20 February 1938 (aged 22)	1	(France) Nice
	DF	Robert Herbin	30 March 1939 (aged 21)	0	(France) Saint-Étienne
	DF	Robert Jonquet (captain)	3 May 1925 (aged 35)	57	(France) Reims
	DF	Bruno Rodzik	29 May 1935 (aged 25)	1	(France) Reims
	DF	Robert Siatka	20 June 1934 (aged 26)	0	(France) Reims
	DF	Jean Wendling	29 April 1934 (aged 26)	6	(France) Reims
	MF	René Ferrier	7 December 1936 (aged 23)	7	(France) Saint-Étienne
	MF	Jean-Jacques Marcel	13 June 1931 (aged 29)	35	(France) Racing Paris
	MF	Lucien Muller	3 September 1934 (aged 25)	7	(France) Reims
	FW	Yvon Douis	16 May 1935 (aged 25)	9	(France) Le Havre
	FW	François Heutte	21 February 1938 (aged 22)	4	(France) Racing Paris
	FW	Paul Sauvage	17 March 1939 (aged 21)	0	(France) Reims
	FW	Michel Stievenard	21 September 1937 (aged 22)	0	(France) Lens
	FW	Jean Vincent	29 November 1930 (aged 29)	39	(France) Reims
	FW	Maryan Wisniewski	1 February 1937 (aged 23)	18	(France) Lens

== Soviet Union ==
Manager: Gavriil Kachalin

No.	Pos.	Player	Date of birth (age)	Caps	Club
	GK	Vladimir Maslachenko	5 March 1936 (aged 24)	1	(Soviet Union) Lokomotiv Moscow
	GK	Lev Yashin	22 October 1929 (aged 30)	30	(Soviet Union) Dynamo Moscow
	DF	Givi Chokheli	27 June 1937 (aged 23)	0	(Soviet Union) Dinamo Tbilisi
	DF	Vladimir Kesarev	26 February 1930 (aged 30)	13	(Soviet Union) Dynamo Moscow
	DF	Anatoly Krutikov	21 September 1933 (aged 26)	2	(Soviet Union) Spartak Moscow
	DF	Anatoli Maslyonkin	29 June 1930 (aged 30)	15	(Soviet Union) Spartak Moscow
	DF	Viktor Tsaryov	2 June 1931 (aged 29)	11	(Soviet Union) Dynamo Moscow
	MF	Igor Netto (captain)	9 January 1930 (aged 30)	35	(Soviet Union) Spartak Moscow
	MF	Yuriy Voynov	29 November 1931 (aged 28)	20	(Soviet Union) Dynamo Kyiv
	FW	German Apukhtin	12 June 1936 (aged 24)	3	(Soviet Union) CSKA Moscow
	FW	Valentin Bubukin	23 April 1933 (aged 27)	3	(Soviet Union) Lokomotiv Moscow
	FW	Valentin Ivanov	19 November 1934 (aged 25)	26	(Soviet Union) Torpedo Moscow
	FW	Zaur Kaloev	24 March 1931 (aged 29)	0	(Soviet Union) Dinamo Tbilisi
	FW	Yury Kovalyov	6 February 1934 (aged 26)	1	(Soviet Union) Dynamo Kyiv
	FW	Mikheil Meskhi	12 January 1937 (aged 23)	3	(Soviet Union) Dinamo Tbilisi
	FW	Slava Metreveli	30 May 1936 (aged 24)	4	(Soviet Union) Torpedo Moscow
	FW	Viktor Ponedelnik	22 May 1937 (aged 23)	1	(Soviet Union) SKA Rostov

== Yugoslavia ==
Managers: Ljubomir Lovrić, Dragomir Nikolić and Aleksandar Tirnanić

No.	Pos.	Player	Date of birth (age)	Caps	Club
	GK	Milutin Šoškić	31 December 1937 (aged 22)	9	(Socialist Federal Republic of Yugoslavia) FK Partizan
	GK	Blagoje Vidinić	11 June 1934 (aged 26)	4	(Socialist Federal Republic of Yugoslavia) Radnički Beograd
	DF	Tomislav Crnković	17 June 1929 (aged 31)	50	(Socialist Federal Republic of Yugoslavia) Dinamo Zagreb
	DF	Vladimir Durković	6 November 1937 (aged 22)	10	(Socialist Federal Republic of Yugoslavia) Crvena Zvezda
	DF	Fahrudin Jusufi	8 December 1939 (aged 20)	6	(Socialist Federal Republic of Yugoslavia) FK Partizan
	DF	Žarko Nikolić	16 October 1938 (aged 21)	1	(Socialist Federal Republic of Yugoslavia) Vojvodina Novi Sad
	MF	Jovan Miladinović	30 January 1939 (aged 21)	6	(Socialist Federal Republic of Yugoslavia) FK Partizan
	MF	Željko Perušić	23 March 1936 (aged 24)	4	(Socialist Federal Republic of Yugoslavia) Dinamo Zagreb
	MF	Ante Žanetić	18 November 1936 (aged 23)	4	(Socialist Federal Republic of Yugoslavia) Hajduk Split
	MF	Branko Zebec	17 May 1929 (aged 31)	59	(Socialist Federal Republic of Yugoslavia) Crvena Zvezda
	FW	Milan Galić	8 March 1938 (aged 22)	4	(Socialist Federal Republic of Yugoslavia) FK Partizan
	FW	Dražan Jerković	6 August 1936 (aged 23)	1	(Socialist Federal Republic of Yugoslavia) Dinamo Zagreb
	FW	Tomislav Knez	9 June 1938 (aged 22)	4	(Socialist Federal Republic of Yugoslavia) Borac Banja Luka
	FW	Bora Kostić (captain)	14 June 1930 (aged 30)	16	(Socialist Federal Republic of Yugoslavia) Crvena Zvezda
	FW	Željko Matuš	9 August 1935 (aged 24)	0	(Socialist Federal Republic of Yugoslavia) Dinamo Zagreb
	FW	Muhamed Mujić	25 April 1932 (aged 28)	19	(Socialist Federal Republic of Yugoslavia) Velež Mostar
	FW	Dragoslav Šekularac	8 November 1937 (aged 22)	15	(Socialist Federal Republic of Yugoslavia) Crvena Zvezda
