= 1960 European Nations' Cup final =

Association football match

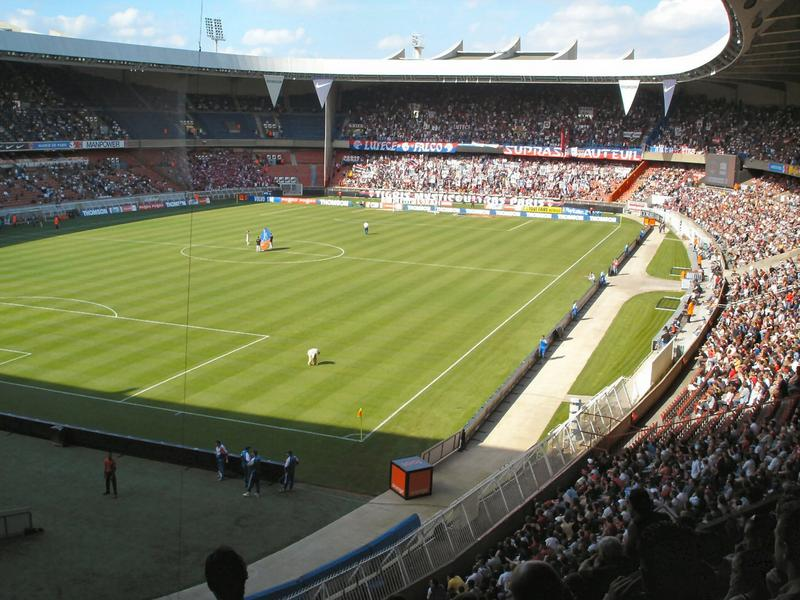
- The Parc des Princes (pictured in 2004) held the final
- Event: 1960 European Nations' Cup
Soviet Union	Yugoslavia
2	1
- After extra time
- Date: 10 July 1960
- Venue: Parc des Princes, Paris
- Referee: Arthur Ellis (England)
- Attendance: 17,966

The 1960 European Nations' Cup final was a football match played at Parc des Princes in Paris, France, on 10 July 1960, to determine the winners of the 1960 European Nations' Cup. It was the first European Championship final, UEFA's top football competition for national teams. The match was contested by the Soviet Union and Yugoslavia.

En route to the final, the Soviet Union defeated Hungary over a two-legged tie, before receiving a walkover in the quarter-finals after Spain withdrew from the tournament. In the semi-finals, the Soviet Union won 3–0 against Czechoslovakia. Meanwhile, Yugoslavia defeated Bulgaria, Portugal and France, the host nation for the final tournament, en route to the final match.

The referee for the final, played in front of 17,966 spectators in rainy conditions, was Arthur Ellis from England. The Soviet Union would secure a 2–1 victory after extra time, winning the inaugural edition of the tournament.

== Background ==
The 1960 European Nations' Cup was the first edition of the UEFA European Football Championship, UEFA's football competition for national teams. Opening rounds were played on a home-and-away basis before the semi-finals and final taking place in France, between 6 and 10 July 1960. A third-place play-off match took place the day before the final.

The Soviet Union had made their international football tournament debut in the 1958 FIFA World Cup where they were beaten 2–0 at the quarter-final stage by hosts Sweden. Yugoslavia also played at the World Cup two years before and had similarly been knocked out in the quarter-finals, by West Germany. The last meeting between the Soviet Union and Yugoslavia was in the 1956 Summer Olympics where the Soviet Union won 1–0 in the final.

== Road to the final ==
=== Soviet Union ===
The Soviet Union's route to the final
Round	Opposition	Score
Round of 16	Hungary	3–1 (H), 1–0 (A)
Quarter-final	Spain	Walkover
Semi-final	Czechoslovakia	3–0 (N)

The Soviet Union started their inaugural European Nations Cup campaign in the round of 16 where they faced Hungary in a two-legged tie. The first match was held at the Central Lenin Stadium in Moscow on 28 September 1958 in front of a crowd of 100,572. Anatoli Ilyin gave the Soviet Union an early lead when he scored the first European Championship goal in the fourth minute. He dispossessed the sweeper Ferenc Sipos inside the Hungary penalty area before shooting past the goalkeeper Béla Bakó. Slava Metreveli doubled the lead in the 20th minute before Valentin Ivanov scored twelve minutes later to make it 3–0 at half-time. Hungary's János Göröcs scored with six minutes remaining to reduce the deficit and the match ended 3–1. The second leg of the round of 16 match took place almost one year later, at the Népstadion in Budapest on 27 September 1959 with an attendance of 78,481. A second-half goal from Yuriy Voynov saw the match end 1–0 to the Soviet Union who progressed to the quarter-final with a 4–1 aggregate victory.

In the quarter-final, the Soviet Union were drawn against Spain but the country's dictatorial leader Francisco Franco ordered the Royal Spanish Football Federation president Alfonso de la Fuente to withdraw the side from the tournament. UEFA penalised Spain financially and awarded the Soviet Union a walkover into the semi-final. There they faced Czechoslovakia at the Stade Vélodrome in Marseille on 6 July 1960 in front of 25,184 spectators. Viktor Ponedelnik went close to scoring for the Soviet Union in the 24th minute but it was Ivanov who gave his side a 1–0 lead with a low left-footed strike from inside the Czechoslovakia penalty area. He doubled his tally and his side's lead eleven minutes after half time with another close range strike. Ponedelnik then scored midway through the second half with a right-footed shot from the edge of the six-yard box. No further goals were scored and the Soviet Union progressed to the inaugural European Nations Cup final with a 3–0 victory.

=== Yugoslavia ===
Yugoslavia's route to the final
Round	Opposition	Score
Round of 16	Bulgaria	2–0 (H), 1–1 (A)
Quarter-final	Portugal	1–2 (A), 5–1 (H)
Semi-final	France	5–4 (N)

Yugoslavia's first European Nations Cup tournament began with a two-legged tie against Bulgaria, the first match of which took place at the Stadion JNA in Belgrade on 31 May 1959. The home side took an early lead through Milan Galić who scored in the first minute. Lazar Tasić then doubled Yugoslavia's lead with three minutes to go to secure a 2–0 victory. The second leg was played at the Vasil Levski National Stadium in Sofia on 25 October 1959. After a goalless first half, Todor Diev gave Bulgaria the lead five minutes after the interval but Muhamed Mujić equalised for Yugoslavia six minutes later. No further goals were scored and the game ended 1–1, with Yugoslavia progressing to the quarter-final with a 3–1 aggregate win. There they faced Portugal with the first leg being hosted at the Estádio Nacional in Lisbon on 8 May 1960. Although Yugoslavia dominated the match, Portugal took a 2–0 lead with goals from Santana and Matateu. With less than ten minutes remaining, Bora Kostić halved the deficit and the match ended 2–1 to Portugal. The second leg took place on 22 May 1960 at Stadion JNA in Belgrade. Dragoslav Šekularac gave Yugoslavia an early lead when he scored in the eighth minute. Domiciano Cavém equalised for Portugal 21 minutes later but Zvezdan Čebinac restored Yugoslavia's lead just before half-time. Two second-half goals from Bora Kostić and one from Galić secured a 5–1 win for Yugoslavia and a 6–3 aggregate victory.

The semi-final saw Yugoslavia face hosts France at the Parc des Princes on 6 July 1960. Eleven minutes into the game, Galić struck the ball from outside the France penalty area and into the top corner of the goal past goalkeeper Georges Lamia. Jean Vincent levelled the match a minute later with a curling shot. François Heutte then gave France a half-time lead with a 43rd-minute strike. Maryan Wisniewski made it 3–1 to France eight minutes after the interval before Ante Žanetić beat Lamia at the near post to reduce Yugoslavia's deficit. Midway through the second half, Heutte restored France's two-goal lead despite Yugoslavia's players' appeals for offside. With 15 minutes remaining, Tomislav Knez made it 4–3 before Dražan Jerković scored twice within a minute, capitalising on errors from Lamia, to secure a 5–4 victory for Yugoslavia and qualification for the inaugural final. As of 2021, the semi-final remains the highest-scoring game in the finals in European Championship history.

== Match ==
=== Pre-match ===
The match was televised live and was played in poor weather conditions. Yugoslavia, managed by a committee, elected to change their goalkeeper, bringing in Blagoje Vidinić in place of Milutin Šoškić who was suffering from an eye problem. They also included debutant Željko Matuš in their starting eleven. The referee for the match was Englishman Arthur Ellis, who had previously officiated the inaugural European Cup Final in 1956 at the Parc des Princes, between Real Madrid and Reims.

=== Summary ===
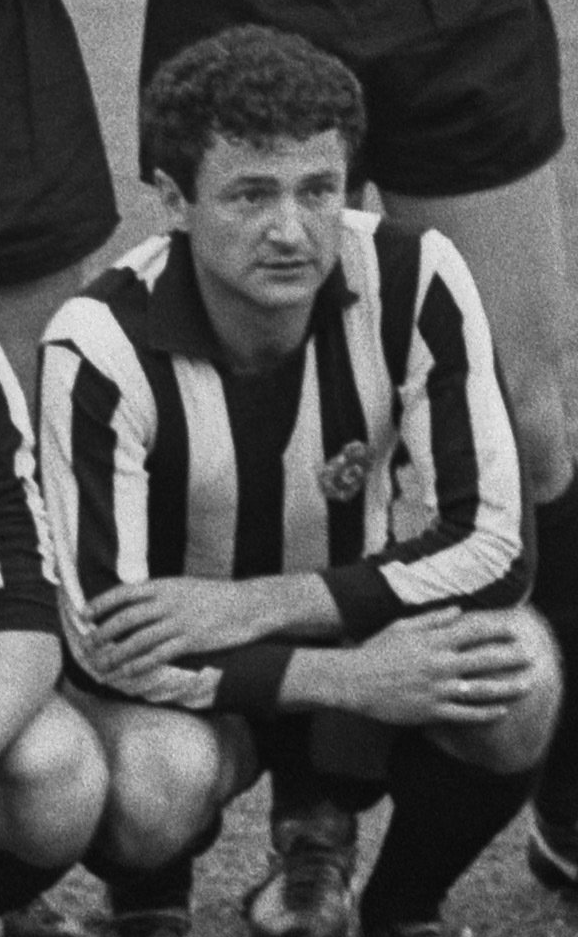
Milan Galić (pictured in 1966) scored Yugoslavia's goal.

The final was played on 10 July 1960 at the Parc des Princes in front of a crowd of 17,966. Yugoslavia dominated the early stages of the match and Soviet Union goalkeeper Lev Yashin was forced to save two free kicks from Kostić. Šekularac's shot then passed just wide with Yashin static. Two minutes before half-time, Yugoslavia took the lead. Jerković played in a low cross which was deflected into the goal past Yashin. Analysis of video of the match is inconclusive: the goal was either scored by Galić or diverted into his own net by the Soviet Union's Igor Netto who was marking the Yugoslavian player. However, historically Galić is credited with the goal. During the interval, former Soviet Union player Boris Kuznetsov who was with the squad, added spikes to his side's boots to cope with the wet conditions underfoot. Four minutes after half-time, the Soviet Union equalised: Valentin Bubukin struck a left-footed shot from around 25 yards (23 m) which was mishandled by Vidinić and Metreveli scored from close range. Late in the match, Metreveli's cross-shot passed across the goalmouth and was missed by Ponedelnik before Ivanov struck it wide from close range. Regular time ended 1–1 and the match went into extra time.

During the additional period, Yashin came out to clear a corner, but Jerković's header went wide. Early in the second half, Žanetić played in a low cross but Galić missed the opportunity to score. In the 113th minute of the final, Ivanov played a cross to Ponedelnik who headed it across the goal and into the corner of the net to give the Soviet Union the lead. Despite a late goalmouth scramble in the Soviet Union penalty area, Ellis blew the whistle to end the match 2–1: the Soviet Union were inaugural European Champions

=== Details ===
10 July 1960
20:30 CET

Soviet Union	2–1 (a.e.t.)	Yugoslavia
Metreveli 49'; Ponedelnik 113'	Report	Galić 43'

Parc des Princes, Paris
Attendance: 17,966
Referee: Arthur Ellis (England)

Soviet Union	Yugoslavia

GK	1	Lev Yashin
RB	2	Givi Chokheli
CB	3	Anatoli Maslyonkin
LB	4	Anatoly Krutikov
RH	5	Yuriy Voynov
LH	6	Igor Netto (c)
OR	7	Slava Metreveli
IR	8	Valentin Ivanov
CF	9	Viktor Ponedelnik
IL	10	Valentin Bubukin
OL	11	Mikheil Meskhi
Manager:
Gavriil Kachalin

GK	1	Blagoje Vidinić
RB	2	Vladimir Durković
CB	5	Jovan Miladinović
LB	3	Fahrudin Jusufi
RH	4	Ante Žanetić
LH	6	Željko Perušić
OR	7	Željko Matuš
IR	10	Dragoslav Šekularac
CF	8	Dražan Jerković
IL	9	Milan Galić
OL	11	Bora Kostić (c)
Managers:
Ljubomir Lovrić; Dragomir Nikolić; Aleksandar Tirnanić

== Post-match ==
The winning goalscorer Ponedelnik later said: "The Soviet national team became the first ever European champions. No one can forget such moments of glory. As for myself, that 113th-minute winner was the most important of my whole career. That was the star moment of my life". All but two of UEFA's team of the tournament had featured in the final, including five Soviet Union and four Yugoslavia players. They celebrated until dawn in Paris, Voynov recalling "... to sit in a Paris cafe with a glass of wine was enough. We didn't drink much. We were drunk on victory." Each of the winning players received $200 in prize money and were celebrated the day after the final at a reception held at the Eiffel Tower. Upon their return to Moscow, they were lauded by more than 100,000 people at a victory parade held in the Central Lenin Stadium. Speaking later, of the sparse attendance, Šekularac suggested that "crowds in France wanted western European glamour, not mysterious teams from the other side of Europe".

Yugoslavia qualified for the 1962 FIFA World Cup where they finished second in Group 1 behind the Soviet Union against whom they had lost 2–0, before defeating West Germany in the quarter-final. They were knocked out in the semi-final by Czechoslovakia and lost to Chile, who had beaten the Soviet Union in the quarter-final, in the third place play-off.

== See also ==
- Soviet Union at the UEFA European Championship
- Yugoslavia at the UEFA European Championship
