= Serbia at the UEFA European Championship =

International football delegation

After the completed dissolution of Yugoslavia in 2006, the Serbia national team did not qualify for the next four UEFA European Championships it played qualifiers for, before finally securing a spot at Euro 2024. Its official predecessor teams Yugoslavia and FR Yugoslavia/Serbia & Montenegro were more successful: the team representing "larger" Yugoslavia became European vice-champions twice (in 1960 and 1968) while the union of Serbia and Montenegro (still named "Yugoslavia" until 2003) reached the quarter-finals at Euro 2000.

== Overall record ==
| UEFA European Championship record | | | | | | | | | Qualification record | | | | | |
| Year | Round | Position | Pld | W | D | L | GF | GA | Pld | W | D | L | GF | GA |
as part of Yugoslavia
| (France) 1960 | Runners-up | 2nd | 2 | 1 | 0 | 1 | 6 | 6 | 4 | 2 | 1 | 1 | 9 | 4 |
| (Spain) 1964 | Did not qualify | | | | | | | | 4 | 2 | 1 | 1 | 6 | 5 |
| (Italy) 1968 | Runners-up | 2nd | 3 | 1 | 1 | 1 | 2 | 3 | 6 | 4 | 1 | 1 | 14 | 5 |
| (Belgium) 1972 | Did not qualify | | | | | | | | 8 | 3 | 4 | 1 | 7 | 5 |
| (Socialist Federal Republic of Yugoslavia) 1976 | Fourth place | 4th | 2 | 0 | 0 | 2 | 4 | 7 | 8 | 6 | 1 | 1 | 15 | 5 |
| (Italy) 1980 | Did not qualify | | | | | | | | 6 | 4 | 0 | 2 | 14 | 6 |
| (France) 1984 | Group stage | 8th | 3 | 0 | 0 | 3 | 2 | 10 | 6 | 3 | 2 | 1 | 12 | 11 |
| (West Germany) 1988 | Did not qualify | | | | | | | | 6 | 4 | 0 | 2 | 13 | 9 |
| (Sweden) 1992 | Qualified, but suspended | | | | | | | | 8 | 7 | 0 | 1 | 24 | 4 |
as part of FR Yugoslavia / Serbia and Montenegro
| (England) 1996 | Suspended | | | | | | | | Suspended | | | | | |
| (Belgium) (Netherlands) 2000 | Quarter-finals | 8th | 4 | 1 | 1 | 2 | 8 | 13 | 8 | 5 | 2 | 1 | 18 | 8 |
| (Portugal) 2004 | Did not qualify | | | | | | | | 8 | 3 | 3 | 2 | 11 | 11 |
as Serbia
| (Austria) (Switzerland) 2008 | Did not qualify | | | | | | | | 14 | 6 | 6 | 2 | 22 | 11 |
| (Poland) (Ukraine) 2012 | Did not qualify | | | | | | | | 10 | 4 | 3 | 3 | 13 | 12 |
| (France) 2016 | Did not qualify | | | | | | | | 8 | 2 | 1 | 5 | 8 | 13 |
| (Europe) 2020 | Did not qualify | | | | | | | | 10 | 5 | 3 | 2 | 20 | 19 |
| (Germany) 2024 | Group stage | 19th | 3 | 0 | 2 | 1 | 1 | 2 | 8 | 4 | 2 | 2 | 15 | 9 |
| (United Kingdom) (Republic of Ireland) 2028 | To be determined | | | | | | | | To be determined | | | | | |
| (Italy) (Turkey) 2032 | To be determined | | | | | | | | To be determined | | | | | |
| Total | Runners-up | 7/17 | 17 | 3 | 4 | 10 | 23 | 41 | 122 | 64 | 30 | 28 | 221 | 137 |

Serbia's European Championship record
| First match | France 4–5 Yugoslavia (Paris, France; 6 July 1960) |
| Biggest win | France 4–5 Yugoslavia (Paris, France; 6 July 1960); Yugoslavia 1–0 England (Florence, Italy; 5 June 1968); Norway 0–1 FR Yugoslavia (Liège, Belgium; 18 June 2000) |
| Biggest defeat | Denmark 5–0 Yugoslavia (Lyon, France; 16 June 1984); Netherlands 6–1 FR Yugoslavia (Rotterdam, Netherlands; 25 June 2000) |
| Best Result | Runners-up in 1960 and 1968 |
| Worst Result | Group stage in 1984 and 2024 |

== List of matches ==
=== As Yugoslavia ===
==== 1960 European Nations' Cup ====
Final tournament

Semi-finals

6 July 1960
20:00

| France | 4–5 | Yugoslavia |
|---|---|---|
| Vincent 12'; Heutte 43', 62'; Wisniewski 53' | Report | Galić 11'; Žanetić 55'; Knez 75'; Jerković 78', 79' |

Parc des Princes, Paris
Attendance: 26,370
Referee: Gaston Grandain (Belgium)

Final

10 July 1960
20:30

| Soviet Union | 2–1 (a.e.t.) | Yugoslavia |
|---|---|---|
| Metreveli 49'; Ponedelnik 113' | Report | Galić 43' |

Parc des Princes, Paris
Attendance: 17,966
Referee: Arthur Ellis (England)

==== Euro 1968 ====
Final tournament

Semi-finals

5 June 1968
21:15

| Yugoslavia | 1–0 | England |
|---|---|---|
| Džajić 86' | Report |

Stadio Comunale, Florence
Attendance: 21,834
Referee: José María Ortiz de Mendíbil (Spain)

Final

Original match

8 June 1968
21:15

| Italy | 1–1 (a.e.t.) | Yugoslavia |
|---|---|---|
| Domenghini 80' | Report | Džajić 39' |

Stadio Olimpico, Rome
Attendance: 68,817
Referee: Gottfried Dienst (Switzerland)

Replay

10 June 1968
21:15

| Italy | 2–0 | Yugoslavia |
|---|---|---|
| Riva 12'; Anastasi 31' | Report |

Stadio Olimpico, Rome
Attendance: 32,886
Referee: José María Ortiz de Mendíbil (Spain)

==== Euro 1976 ====
Final tournament

Semi-finals

17 June 1976
20:15

| Yugoslavia | 2–4 (a.e.t.) | West Germany |
|---|---|---|
| Popivoda 19'; Džajić 30' | Report | Flohe 64'; Müller 82', 115', 119' |

Red Star Stadium, Belgrade
Attendance: 50,652
Referee: Alfred Delcourt (Belgium)

Third place play-off

19 June 1976
20:15

| Netherlands | 3–2 (a.e.t.) | Yugoslavia |
|---|---|---|
| Geels 27', 107'; W. van de Kerkhof 39' | Report | Katalinski 43'; Džajić 82' |

Stadion Maksimir, Zagreb
Attendance: 6,766
Referee: Walter Hungerbühler (Switzerland)

==== Euro 1984 ====
Group stage

| Pos | Team | Pld | W | D | L | GF | GA | GD | Pts | Qualification |
|---|---|---|---|---|---|---|---|---|---|---|
| 1 | France (H) | 3 | 3 | 0 | 0 | 9 | 2 | +7 | 6 | Advance to knockout stage |
| 2 | Denmark | 3 | 2 | 0 | 1 | 8 | 3 | +5 | 4 | Advance to knockout stage |
| 3 | Belgium | 3 | 1 | 0 | 2 | 4 | 8 | −4 | 2 | |
| 4 | Yugoslavia | 3 | 0 | 0 | 3 | 2 | 10 | −8 | 0 | |

Source: UEFA
Rules for classification: Group stage tiebreakers
(H) Hosts
13 June 1984
20:30

| Belgium | 2–0 | Yugoslavia |
|---|---|---|
| Vandenbergh 28'; Grün 45' | Report |

Stade Félix-Bollaert, Lens
Attendance: 41,525
Referee: Erik Fredriksson (Sweden)

16 June 1984
20:30

| Denmark | 5–0 | Yugoslavia |
|---|---|---|
| Arnesen 8', 69' (pen.); Berggreen 16'; Elkjær 82'; Lauridsen 84' | Report |

Stade de Gerland, Lyon
Attendance: 34,736
Referee: Augusto Lamo Castillo (Spain)

19 June 1984
20:30

| France | 3–2 | Yugoslavia |
|---|---|---|
| Platini 59', 62', 77' | Report | Šestić 32'; D. Stojković 84' (pen.) |

Stade Geoffroy-Guichard, Saint-Étienne
Attendance: 47,510
Referee: André Daina (Switzerland)

=== As FR Yugoslavia ===
==== Euro 2000 ====
Group stage

| Pos | Team | Pld | W | D | L | GF | GA | GD | Pts | Qualification |
|---|---|---|---|---|---|---|---|---|---|---|
| 1 | Spain | 3 | 2 | 0 | 1 | 6 | 5 | +1 | 6 | Advance to knockout stage |
| 2 | FR Yugoslavia | 3 | 1 | 1 | 1 | 7 | 7 | 0 | 4 (Note: Head-to-head result: Norway 0–1 FR Yugoslavia.) | Advance to knockout stage |
| 3 | Norway | 3 | 1 | 1 | 1 | 1 | 1 | 0 | 4 | |
| 4 | Slovenia | 3 | 0 | 2 | 1 | 4 | 5 | −1 | 2 | |

Source: UEFA
Rules for classification: Group stage tiebreakers
Notes:
13 June 2000
20:45

| FR Yugoslavia | 3–3 | Slovenia |
|---|---|---|
| Milošević 67', 73'; Drulović 70' | Report | Zahovič 23', 57'; Pavlin 52' |

Stade du Pays de Charleroi, Charleroi
Attendance: 18,500
Referee: Vítor Melo Pereira (Portugal)

18 June 2000
20:45

| Norway | 0–1 | FR Yugoslavia |
|---|---|---|
| | Report | Milošević 8' |

Stade Maurice Dufrasne, Liège
Attendance: 28,750
Referee: Hugh Dallas (Scotland)

21 June 2000
18:00

| FR Yugoslavia | 3–4 | Spain |
|---|---|---|
| Milošević 30'; Govedarica 50'; Komljenović 75' | Report | Alfonso 38', 90+5'; Munitis 51'; Mendieta 90+4' (pen.) |

Jan Breydel Stadium, Bruges
Attendance: 26,611
Referee: Gilles Veissière (France)

Knockout stage

Quarter-finals

25 June 2000
18:00

| Netherlands | 6–1 | FR Yugoslavia |
|---|---|---|
| Kluivert 24', 38', 54'; Govedarica 51' (o.g.); Overmars 78', 90+1' | Report | Milošević 90+2' |

Feijenoord Stadion, Rotterdam
Attendance: 44,000
Referee: José María García-Aranda (Spain)

=== As Serbia ===
==== Euro 2024 ====
Group stage

| Pos | Team | Pld | W | D | L | GF | GA | GD | Pts | Qualification |
|---|---|---|---|---|---|---|---|---|---|---|
| 1 | England | 3 | 1 | 2 | 0 | 2 | 1 | +1 | 5 | Advance to knockout stage |
| 2 | Denmark | 3 | 0 | 3 | 0 | 2 | 2 | 0 | 3 (Note: Tied on head-to-head result (Slovenia 1–1 Denmark), overall goal difference and overall goals scored. Disciplinary points: Denmark −6, Slovenia −7.) | Advance to knockout stage |
| 3 | Slovenia | 3 | 0 | 3 | 0 | 2 | 2 | 0 | 3 | Advance to knockout stage |
| 4 | Serbia | 3 | 0 | 2 | 1 | 1 | 2 | −1 | 2 | |

Source: UEFA
Notes:
16 June 2024
21:00

| Serbia | 0–1 | England |
|---|---|---|
| | Report | Bellingham 13' |

Arena AufSchalke, Gelsenkirchen
Attendance: 48,953
Referee: Daniele Orsato (Italy)

20 June 2024
15:00

| Slovenia | 1–1 | Serbia |
|---|---|---|
| Karničnik 69' | Report | Jović 90+5' |

Allianz Arena, Munich
Attendance: 63,028
Referee: István Kovács (Romania)

25 June 2024
21:00

| Denmark | 0–0 | Serbia |
|---|---|---|
| | Report |

Allianz Arena, Munich
Attendance: 64,288
Referee: François Letexier (France)

== See also ==
- Serbia at the FIFA World Cup
