= Hugo Ruševljanin =

Yugoslav football coach (1927–1990)

Personal information
- Full name: Hugo Ruševljanin
- Date of birth: 4 June 1927
- Date of death: 1990 (aged 62–63)

Managerial career
- Years: Team
- 1958: Novi Sad
- 1961–1964: Yugoslavia
- 1963–1964: Partizan (sporting director)
- Vardar

Hugo Ruševljanin (Serbian Cyrillic: Хуго Рушевљанин; 4 September 1927 – 1990) was a Yugoslav football coach. He was most notable as a long serving coach of Novi Sad while the lower ranked Yugoslavian club has entered top flight level. Later, he coached Partizan and FK Vardar. Since 1961, Him, Prvoslav Mihajlović, Ljubomir Lovrić and Milovan Ćirić - have formed the training committee to manage the Yugoslavia national football team. In 1963-64 he has remained in same position together with Ljubomir Lovrić. He died in 1990.

== Influence ==
Along with managing teams, Ruševljanin was also a mentor to younger coaches, making a huge impact on coaches such as Dragoljub Bekvalac and Milan Živadinović.
