= Šeki snima, pazi se =

- Directed by: Marijan Vajda
- Written by: Dragutin Dobričanin
- Produced by: Jadran Film
- Starring: Dragoslav Šekularac; Lola Novaković; Pavle Minčić; Aleksandar Stojković; Zoran Longinović; Fraho Konjhodžić
- Edited by: Ljerka Stanojević
- Music by: Darko Kraljić
- Production company: Milorad Marković
- Release date: 31 March 1962
- Running time: 100 minutes
- Country: FPR Yugoslavia
- Language: Serbo-Croatian

Šeki snima, pazi se (English: Šeki is Filming, Watch Out!) is a Yugoslav comedy film directed by Marijan Vajda. It was released in 1962.

Considering football sensation Dragoslav Šekularac (nicknamed Šeki, hence the film's title) was probably the first sports superstar in Yugoslavia whose fame transcended sporting bounds, the popularity he enjoyed during his playing heyday was the main reason that Šeki snima, pazi se came about. The film was football-related and was built around his public persona.

The film featured other cult-figure pop icons in smaller roles such as singer Lola Novaković, the band Sedmorica mladih and actor Jovan "Burduš" Janićijević.
