= Givi Chokheli =

Georgian footballer

Personal information
- Full name: Givi Dmitriyevich Chokheli
- Date of birth: 27 June 1937
- Place of birth: Telavi, Georgian SSR, USSR
- Date of death: 25 February 1994 (aged 56)
- Place of death: Tbilisi, Georgia
- Height: 1.82 m (6 ft 0 in)
- Position: Defender

Senior career*
Years	Team	Apps	(Gls)
1956	Nadikvari Telavi		
1956–1965	Dinamo Tbilisi	159	(4)

International career
1960–1962	USSR	19	(0)

Managerial career
- 1966–1968: Dinamo Tbilisi (assistant)
- 1969–1970: Dinamo Tbilisi
- 1971–1972: Dinamo Tbilisi (assistant)
- 1974: Dinamo Tbilisi
Medal record
Representing Soviet Union
UEFA European Championship
Winner	1960 France
- * Club domestic league appearances and goals

Givi Dmitriyevich Chokheli (Georgian: გივი ჩოხელი; Russian: Гиви Дмитриевич Чохели) (27 June 1937 in Telavi – 25 February 1994 in Tbilisi) was a Georgian football defender.

Chokheli played most of his career for Dinamo Tbilisi. After ending his playing career he worked in various coaching positions for Dinamo Tbilisi and in 1969-1970 and 1974 was a head coach. He was classified as a Master of Sport of the USSR in 1959.

He played for Soviet Union national team (19 matches), and was a participant at the 1962 FIFA World Cup and at the 1960 UEFA European Football Championship, where the Soviet Union won the gold medal. The Soviet back line was anchored by the famous trio of Chokheli, Anatoli Maslyonkin, and Anatoly Krutikov in the early 1960s.

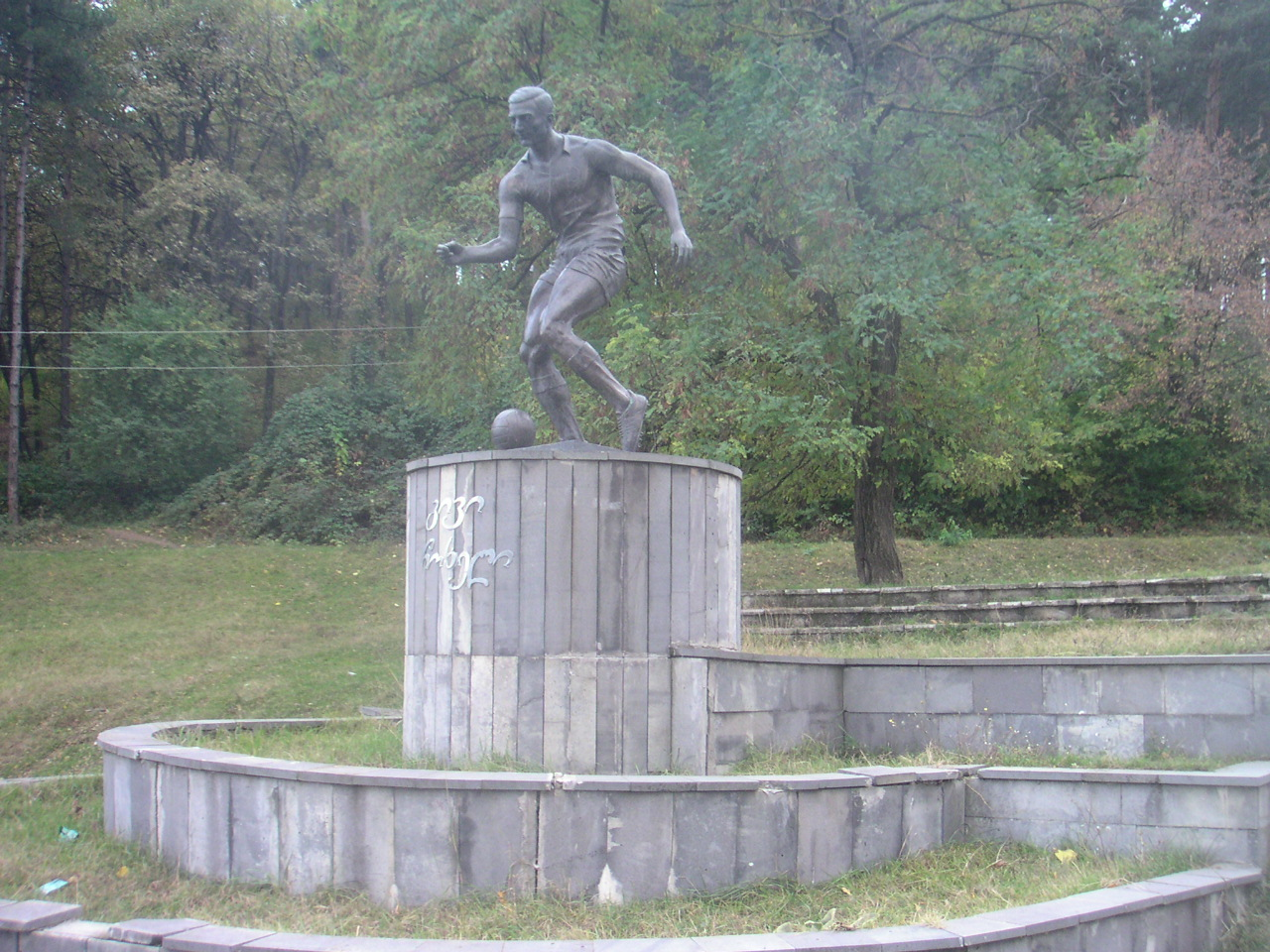
The statue of Chokheli in front of Municipal Stadium, Telavi.

Telavi's Municipal Stadium features a statue of Chokheli in front of it.
