= Cesare Jonni =

Italian football referee

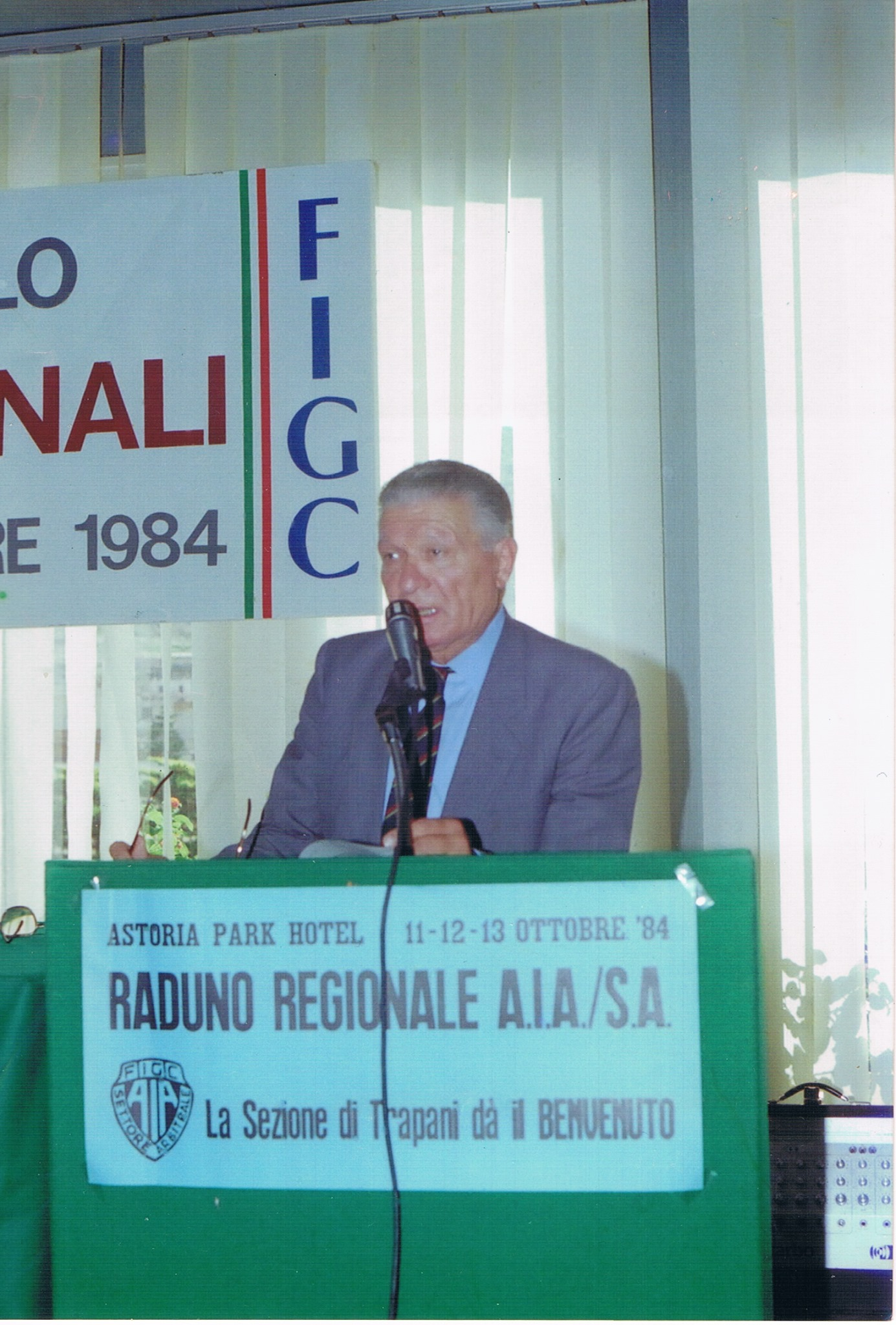
- Born: 21 January 1917; Macerata, Italy
- Died: 11 July 2008 (aged 91); Macerata, Italy

Domestic
Years	League	Role
1951–1964	Serie A	Referee

International
Years	League	Role
1954–1964	FIFA listed	Referee

Cesare Jonni (21 January 1917 – 11 July 2008) was an Italian football referee.

== Refereeing career ==
In 1951, Jonni assigned to referee in Serie A, the top flight of football in Italy. Three years later, he was appointed as a FIFA referee.

In 1960, Jonni was appointed as a referee for the 1960 European Nations' Cup, where he officiated two matches. The first was a semi-final match between Czechoslovakia and the Soviet Union. The second match he officiated was the third place play-off between Czechoslovakia and France.

Less than two months later, Jonni was appointed as a referee for the 1960 Summer Olympics, where he officiated two group stage matches.

In 1962, Jonni was appointed as a referee for the 1962 FIFA World Cup, where he officiated a group stage match between the Soviet Union and Uruguay.

Jonni retired from refereeing in 1964.
