= Jean Wendling =

French footballer (born 1934)

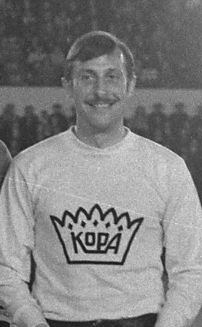

Personal information
- Full name: Jean Wendling
- Date of birth: September 23, 1934 (age 92)
- Place of birth: Bischheim, Bas-Rhin, France
- Position: Defender

Youth career
- SC Schiltigheim

Senior career*
Years	Team	Apps	(Gls)
1951–1957	Strasbourg	42	(0)
1957–1959	Toulouse		
1959–1965	Reims		
1965–?	Vauban Strasbourg		

International career
1959–1963	France	26	(0)
- * Club domestic league appearances and goals

Jean Wendling (born 29 April 1934 in Bischheim, Bas-Rhin) is a French former football defender. He played for France in the Euro 1960.

== Titles ==
- French championship in 1960, 1962 with Stade de Reims
