= Jean Taillandier =

French footballer (born 1938)

Personal information
- Date of birth: January 22, 1938 (age 88)
- Place of birth: Auzances, Creuse, France
- Height: 1.77 m (5 ft 10 in)
- Position: Goalkeeper

Senior career*
Years	Team	Apps	(Gls)
1955–1964	RC Paris		
1964–1969	Lens		

International career
1960	France	3	(0)
- * Club domestic league appearances and goals

Jean Taillandier (born 22 January 1938) is a French former football goalkeeper. He played for France in the Euro 1960.
