= Michel Stievenard =

French footballer (1937–2026)

Michel Stievenard (21 September 1937 – 29 May 2026) was a French footballer who played as a forward for Lens (1954–1961) and Angers (1961–1969). He earned two caps for the France national team in 1960, and was part of the squad that competed in the 1960 European Nations' Cup.

Stievenard died on 29 May 2026, at the age of 88.
