= Valentin Ivanov (footballer, born 1934) =

Soviet footballer (1934–2011)

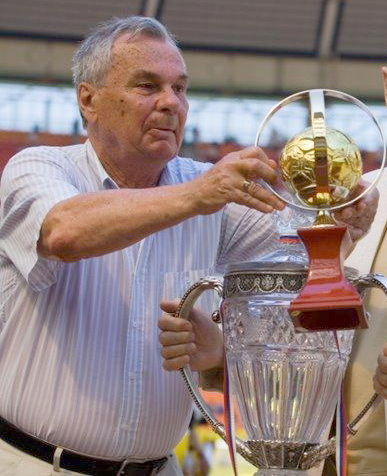
- Ivanov in 2007

Personal information
- Full name: Valentin Kozmich Ivanov
- Date of birth: 19 November 1934
- Place of birth: Moscow, Russian SFSR, Soviet Union
- Date of death: 8 November 2011 (aged 76)
- Place of death: Moscow, Russia
- Height: 1.78 m (5 ft 10 in)
- Position: Midfielder

Youth career
- 1950–1952: Krylia Sovetov Moscow

Senior career*
Years	Team	Apps	(Gls)
1952–1966	Torpedo Moscow	286	(124)

International career
1955–1965	Soviet Union	59	(26)

Managerial career
- 1967–1970: Torpedo Moscow
- 1973–1978: Torpedo Moscow
- 1980–1991: Torpedo Moscow
- 1992–1993: Raja Casablanca
- 1994: Asmaral Moscow
- 1994–1996: Torpedo-Luzhniki Moscow
- 1998: Torpedo Moscow
- 2003: Torpedo-Metallurg Moscow
Medal record
Representing Soviet Union
Men's Football
Gold medal – first place	1956 Melbourne	Team
UEFA European Championship
Winner	1960 France
Runner-up	1964 Spain
- * Club domestic league appearances and goals

Valentin Kozmich Ivanov (Russian: Валентин Козьмич Иванов, 19 November 1934 – 8 November 2011) was a Russian footballer who played as a midfielder. He was the co-leading scorer at the 1962 World Cup, and the co-1960 European Nations' Cup top scorer.

Ivanov appeared 59 times for the Soviet Union, scoring 26 goals. He is the Soviet national football team's third-highest goalscorer of all time, behind only Oleg Blokhin and Oleg Protasov. One of the finest Russian players ever, Ivanov was noted for his pace, dribbling quality and technical ability.

Ivanov's four goals in the 1962 World Cup saw him named the tournament's top-scorer, along with five other players; he also scored one in the 1958 edition. He spent most of his club career with Torpedo Moscow, scoring 124 goals in 286 appearances in the Soviet Championship, the 9th all-time best record.

== Personal life and death ==
Ivanov married Lidiya Ivanova, an Olympic champion in gymnastics in 1956 and 1960. Their son, also named Valentin (born 1961), is a retired international football referee.

Ivanov died on 8 November 2011, shortly before his 77th birthday, following a long struggle with Alzheimer's disease.

== Career statistics ==
=== Club ===
Appearances and goals by club, season and competition
Club	Season	League		
Club	Season	Division	Apps	Goals
Torpedo Moscow	1953	Top League	19	4
Torpedo Moscow	1954	Top League	22	7
Torpedo Moscow	1955	Top League	13	5
Torpedo Moscow	1956	Top League	21	13
Torpedo Moscow	1957	Top League	22	14
Torpedo Moscow	1958	Top League	18	14
Torpedo Moscow	1959	Top League	21	6
Torpedo Moscow	1960	Top League	17	8
Torpedo Moscow	1961	Top League	23	9
Torpedo Moscow	1962	Top League	13	4
Torpedo Moscow	1963	Top League	36	17
Torpedo Moscow	1964	Top League	30	14
Torpedo Moscow	1965	Top League	22	7
Torpedo Moscow	1966	Top League	11	2
Total			287	124

=== International ===
Appearances and goals by national team and year
National team	Year	Apps	Goals
Soviet Union	1955	1	1
Soviet Union	1956	8	5
Soviet Union	1957	5	1
Soviet Union	1958	8	3
Soviet Union	1959	3	1
Soviet Union	1960	4	4
Soviet Union	1961	7	0
Soviet Union	1962	7	5
Soviet Union	1963	5	1
Soviet Union	1964	6	2
Soviet Union	1965	5	3
Total		59	26

Scores and results list Soviet Union's goal tally first, score column indicates score after each Ivanov goal.

List of international goals scored by Valentin Ivanov
No.	Date	Venue	Opponent	Score	Result	Competition
1	26 June 1955	Råsunda, Stockholm, Sweden	Sweden	6–0	6–0	Friendly
2	23 May 1956	Central Dynamo Stadium, Moscow, Soviet Union	Denmark	1–0	5–1	Friendly
3	11 July 1956	Central Dynamo Stadium, Moscow, Soviet Union	Israel	2–0	5–0	1956 Summer Olympics qualification
4	11 July 1956	Central Dynamo Stadium, Moscow, Soviet Union	Israel	4–0	5–0	1956 Summer Olympics qualification
5	15 September 1956	Niedersachsenstadion, Hanover, West Germany	West Germany	2–1	2–1	Friendly
6	1 December 1956	Olympic Park Stadium, Melbourne, Australia	Indonesia	2–0	4–0	1956 Summer Olympics
7	20 October 1957	Stadion Śląski, Chorzów, Poland	Poland	1–2	1–2	1958 FIFA World Cup qualification
8	18 May 1958	Central Lenin Stadium, Moscow, Soviet Union	England	1–1	1–1	Friendly
9	11 June 1958	Ryavallen, Borås, Sweden	Austria	2–0	2–0	1958 FIFA World Cup
10	28 September 1958	Central Lenin Stadium, Moscow, Soviet Union	Hungary	3–0	3–1	1960 European Nations' Cup
11	6 September 1959	Central Lenin Stadium, Moscow, Soviet Union	Czechoslovakia	3–1	3–1	Friendly
12	19 May 1960	Central Lenin Stadium, Moscow, Soviet Union	Poland	1–0	7–1	Friendly
13	19 May 1960	Central Lenin Stadium, Moscow, Soviet Union	Poland	6–1	7–1	Friendly
14	6 July 1960	Stade Vélodrome, Marseille, France	Czechoslovakia	1–0	3–0	1960 European Nations' Cup
15	6 July 1960	Stade Vélodrome, Marseille, France	Czechoslovakia	2–0	3–0	1960 European Nations' Cup
16	27 April 1962	Central Lenin Stadium, Moscow, Soviet Union	Uruguay	4–0	5–0	Friendly
17	31 May 1962	Estadio Carlos Dittborn, Arica, Chile	Yugoslavia	1–0	2–0	1962 FIFA World Cup
18	3 June 1962	Estadio Carlos Dittborn, Arica, Chile	Colombia	1–0	4–4	1962 FIFA World Cup
19	3 June 1962	Estadio Carlos Dittborn, Arica, Chile	Colombia	3–0	4–4	1962 FIFA World Cup
20	6 June 1962	Estadio Carlos Dittborn, Arica, Chile	Uruguay	2–1	2–1	1962 FIFA World Cup
21	22 September 1963	Central Lenin Stadium, Moscow, Soviet Union	Hungary	1–0	1–1	Friendly
22	12 September 1964	Råsunda, Stockholm, Sweden	Sweden	1–0	1–1	1964 European Nations' Cup quarter-finals
23	17 June 1964	Camp Nou, Barcelona, Spain	Denmark	3–0	3–0	1964 European Nations' Cup
24	23 May 1965	Central Lenin Stadium, Moscow, Soviet Union	Greece	2–1	3–1	1966 FIFA World Cup qualification
25	23 May 1965	Central Lenin Stadium, Moscow, Soviet Union	Greece	3–1	3–1	1966 FIFA World Cup qualification
26	30 May 1965	Central Lenin Stadium, Moscow, Soviet Union	Wales	1–0	2–1	1966 FIFA World Cup qualification

== Honours ==
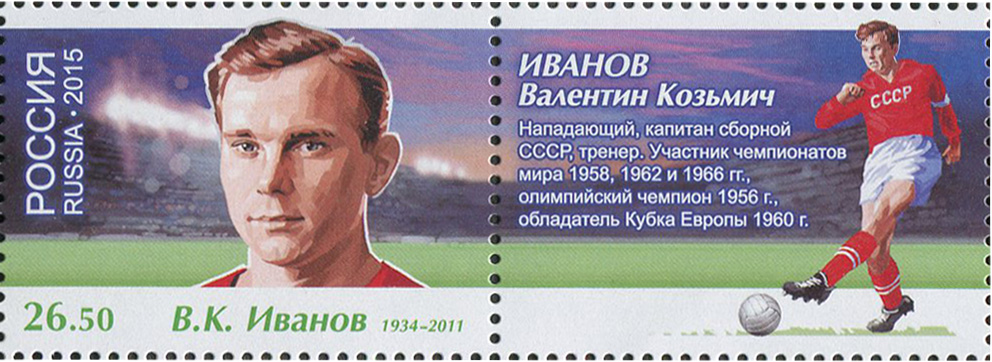
Ivanov on a 2016 Russian stamp from the series "Football Legends"

Torpedo Moscow

- Soviet Top League: 1960, 1965
- Soviet Cup: 1960

Soviet Union

- UEFA European Football Championship: 1960, runner-up 1964
- Olympic Gold Medal: 1956

Individual

- The best 33 football players of the Soviet Union (12): No. 1 (1955, 1957-1964); No. 2 (1953, 1956, 1965)
- UEFA European Championship Golden Boot: 1960
- UEFA European Championship Team of the Tournament: 1960, 1964
- FIFA World Cup Top Scorer: 1962
- Soviet Footballer of the Year: Second Place: 1964
- UEFA Jubilee Poll (2004): #45

== See also ==
- List of FIFA World Cup top goalscorers
