= Jovan Miladinović =

Serbian footballer

Personal information
- Full name: Jovan Miladinović
- Date of birth: 30 January 1939
- Place of birth: Belgrade, Kingdom of Yugoslavia
- Date of death: 11 September 1982 (aged 43)
- Place of death: Belgrade, SFR Yugoslavia
- Height: 1.77 m (5 ft 9 1/2 in)
- Position: Midfielder

Youth career
- 1953–1966: Partizan

Senior career*
Years	Team	Apps	(Gls)
1956–1966	Partizan	120	(11)
1966–1967	1. FC Nürnberg	5	(0)

International career
1959–1964	Yugoslavia	17	(0)

Managerial career
- 1976: Partizan
- 1979: Partizan
Medal record
Men's Football
Representing Yugoslavia
European Championship
Silver medal – second place	1960 France	Team
- * Club domestic league appearances and goals

Jovan Miladinović (30 January 1939 – 11 September 1982), commonly known as Zoran, was a Yugoslav football player and coach.

During his club career he played for FK Partizan and 1. FC Nürnberg. He earned 17 caps for the Yugoslavia national team and participated in the 1960 European Nations' Cup.

His entire coaching career was tied to FK Partizan, where he worked as assistant to various head coaches and filled in at the head position during two separate stints that lasted a few months. He was married and had two children.

== Playing career ==
From 1953, since he was 13 years old he went through all the youth selections of Partizan and was among the first talents raised by coach Florijan Matekalo in 1957. He made his debut on the First League stage. As an excellent defensive player, mostly in the position of wing half and center half, he played a total of 271 games for Partizan and scored 64 goals. A very talented player, according to the general opinion, due to injuries and bohemian lifestyle, he did not realize even a part of his potential. He won four titles of the Yugoslav champion: 1960/61, 1961/62, 1962/63 and 1964/65, along with one national cup trophy: 1956/57.

He played one season for the German club 1. FC Nürnberg (1966/1967), but he played only five games in the Bundesliga due to illness.

With one youth match (1959), he played 17 games for Yugoslavia. He made his debut on October 11, 1959 against Hungary (2–4) in Belgrade, and he played his last game on November 22, 1964 against the Soviet Union (1–1) in Belgrade. He played in the final tournament of the 1960 European Nations' Cup in France and in the Summer Olympics in 1964 in Japan.

At only 28 years old, he had to end his career. His untimely death found him in the position of a member of the professional staff of Partizan, where he started working in 1974.
