= František Šafránek =

Czech footballer (1931–1987)

Personal information
- Date of birth: 2 January 1931
- Place of birth: Prague, Czechoslovakia
- Date of death: 27 June 1987 (aged 56)
- Position: Defender

Youth career
- 1939–1949: Sportovní sdružení Vršovice

Senior career*
Years	Team	Apps	(Gls)
1949–1952	Spartak Sokolovo		
1952–1966	Dukla Prague		
1966–1970	Spartak BS Vlašim		
1974–1976	RH Strašnice		

International career
1951–1961	Czechoslovakia	22	(1)
- * Club domestic league appearances and goals

František Šafránek (2 January 1931 – 27 June 1987) was a Czech football player.

Šafránek played for several clubs, including Spartak Sokolovo (1949–1952) and Dukla Prague (1952–1966).

He played for Czechoslovakia national team (22 matches and one goal), and was a participant at the 1954 FIFA World Cup, where he played in two matches, at the 1958 FIFA World Cup, and at the 1960 UEFA European Football Championship.

He died from heart failure during the match of former Dukla Prague players in June 1987.
