= Gaston Grandain =

Belgian football referee (1911–2000)

- Born: 16 April 1911; Ixelles, Belgium
- Died: 2000 (aged 88–89)

International
Years	League	Role
1956–1961	FIFA listed	Referee

Gaston Grandain (16 April 1911 – 2000) was a Belgian football referee.

== Refereeing career ==
Grandain was assigned as a FIFA referee in 1956.

In 1960, Grandain was appointed as a referee for the 1960 European Nations' Cup, where he officiated a semi-final match between France and Yugoslavia.

Grandain retired from refereeing in 1961. He died in 2000.
