= Dragoslav Šekularac =

Yugoslav and Serbian footballer and coach (1937–2019)

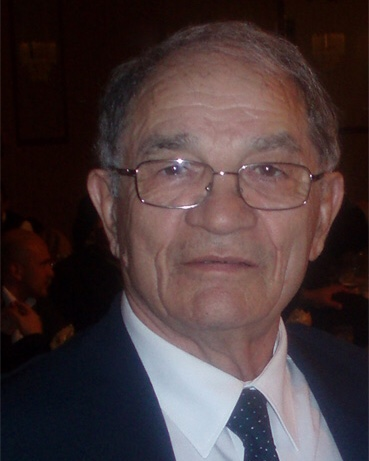
- Šekularac in November 2007

Personal information
- Full name: Dragoslav Šekularac
- Date of birth: 8 November 1937
- Place of birth: Štip, Vardar Banovina of Kingdom of Yugoslavia (present-day North Macedonia)
- Date of death: 5 January 2019 (aged 81)
- Place of death: Belgrade, Serbia
- Height: 1.71 m (5 ft 7 in)
- Position: Attacking midfielder

Youth career
- 1951–1955: Red Star Belgrade

Senior career*
Years	Team	Apps	(Gls)
1955–1966	Red Star Belgrade	153	(31)
1966–1967	Karlsruher SC	17	(2)
1967	St. Louis Stars	8	(1)
1968–1969	OFK Belgrade	38	(5)
1969–1971	Santa Fe	42	(3)
1972	Atlético Bucaramanga	4	(1)
1973	Millonarios	23	(1)
1974	América de Cali	7	(0)
1975	Paris	9	(2)
1975	Serbian White Eagles		

International career
1954–1956	Yugoslavia U20	8	(2)
1955–1956	Yugoslavia U21	2	(0)
1956–1966	Yugoslavia	41	(6)

Managerial career
- 1975: Serbian White Eagles (player-coach)
- 1976–1977: Mladenovac
- 1978: New York Eagles
- 1984–1985: Guatemala
- 1986–1987: Footscray JUST
- 1989–1990: Red Star Belgrade
- 1990–1991: América
- 1992: Al-Nassr
- 1993: Heidelberg United
- 1994–1995: Marbella
- 1996: Daewoo Royals
- 1996–1997: Napredak Kruševac
- 1999: Obilić
- 2006: Serbian White Eagles
Medal record
Men's Football
Representing Yugoslavia
Olympic Games
Silver medal – second place	1956 Melbourne	Team
European Championship
Silver medal – second place	1960 France	Team
- * Club domestic league appearances and goals

Dragoslav Šekularac (Serbian Cyrillic: Драгослав Шекуларац, pronounced [drǎgoslaʋ ʃekulârats]; 8 November 1937 – 5 January 2019) was a Yugoslav and Serbian professional footballer and coach.

Nicknamed Šeki, he played as an attacking midfielder, and his enormous popularity throughout FPR Yugoslavia during the early 1960s transcended sports as he easily became one of the most recognizable individuals in the country. As a coach, he led several clubs in Canada, Colombia, Australia, Serbia, Mexico, and Spain, as well as the Guatemala national team in the 1986 FIFA World Cup qualification.

Šekularac is considered one of the most important players in the history of Red Star Belgrade: he is the second (and one of only five players) to have been awarded the Zvezdina zvezda status.

== Early life ==
Šekularac was born on 8 November 1937 in Štip, Vardar Banovina, Kingdom of Yugoslavia present day North Macedonia to mixed family Montenegrin Serb father Bogosav from the village of Kurikuće, Berane Municipality (the Vasojevići region in northern Montenegro) and Macedonian mother Donka (née Markovska). His father was a lawyer whose job took him to Štip where he got married and started a family. Dragoslav was a six-month-old infant when the family moved to the Yugoslav capital Belgrade as a result of his father landing a job at the Ministry of Agriculture. The family resided in central Belgrade, on Hilandarska Street near the Politika office building, and their second son, Dragoslav's younger brother Mirko, was born in 1941.

Šekularac was born bowlegged, much like Garrincha, a footballer whom he was later often compared to. The youngster took up street football very early, right after World War II ended, playing on concrete in his school yard and displaying exceptional dribbling skills.

Young Šekularac simultaneously became a fan of the recently established Red Star Belgrade football club, sneaking into their matches at the old SK Jugoslavija ground. Though lacking in height and having a stocky build, he nevertheless also enjoyed basketball—frequently going to the Mali Kalemegdan outdoor concrete court to watch Red Star Belgrade basketball club games featuring their stars Aleksandar Gec, Tullio Rochlitzer, and Srđan Kalember.

Well versed in street football, the youngster's first attempt at structured association football took place via a tryout at the Red Star Belgrade under-14 youth squad. Adjudged to be short and physically underdeveloped, young Šekularac was rejected. Months later, he would experience another rejection before eventually being accepted on his third try, under the youth team coach Dimitrije Milojević whom Šekularac and the rest of the youth squad referred to as Čika Mitke (Uncle Mitke).

== Club career ==
=== Red Star Belgrade ===
Šekularac made his senior debut at only 17 years of age on 6 March 1955 during the latter part of Red Star's 1954–55 league campaign under head coach Milovan Ćirić. The youngster would record only one more league appearance by the end of that season.

However, the next season, 1955–56, signaled immediate breakthrough. In addition to securing a spot in the first team, he also became an integral part of the squad that won the Yugoslav league title in convincing fashion. He contributed to the cause with 7 goals in addition to many eye-catching midfield displays that would soon become a staple of his game.

By the start of the 1956–57 season, eighteen-year-old Šekularac had already made his senior national team debut. And, in November and December 1956 during the league's winter break, he represented FPR Yugoslavia at the 1956 Melbourne Olympics. Despite added pressures and responsibilities, he turned in another stellar league season helping Red Star to another title. He also played an important part in Red Star's European Champions' Cup campaign that ended at semi-final stage versus AC Fiorentina.

All the success led to coach Ćirić receiving and taking the S.S. Lazio head coaching offer position. In his place came Miša Pavić who previously mentored Šekularac in the club's youth setup. The season was not much of a success, however, either team-wise or for Šekularac individually. Increased opponents' defensive focus multiplied the number of hits and knocks he was forced to endure during games. He battled injury problems that caused him to miss almost half of the season as Red Star quickly fell out of title contention.

Though the next 1958–59 season brought continued injury issues, Šekularac, by now a bona fide star across the league, managed to lead his team to league-cup double, both at the expense of arch-rival FK Partizan. In 1959 after winning the league and cup double with Red Star, Italian industrialist Gianni Agnelli spared no expense in order to bring 21-year-old Šekularac to Juventus. The transfer was reportedly stopped by the highest echelons of communist nomenclature in FPR Yugoslavia, with even the interior minister Aleksandar Ranković commenting that Šeki is needed in the country to "entertain the working class".

Šekularac is also remembered as the perpetrator of an infamous on-pitch incident in fall 1962 when he assaulted referee Pavle Tumbas in the middle of a league match. He ended up serving a year and a half long suspension.

He ended up playing 375 official competitive matches (156 of those in the league) for Red Star and scoring over 119 goals (32 league goals).

=== Playing abroad ===
He later played for Independiente Santa Fe in Colombia for five seasons, before transferring to Millonarios from Bogotá. He eventually ended his playing career in France with Paris FC and later on as a player-coach in Canada with the Serbian White Eagles in 1975. While in Toronto, Šekularac posed for a photograph beside the royal insignia of pre-war Serbia for which he had his passport temporarily revoked by the Yugoslav government. While playing in Colombia, he was referred to as el Pelé blanco (the white Pelé).

== International career ==
At only 18, he made his national team debut on 30 September 1956. He was on the national side that won the silver medal at the 1956 Summer Olympics in Melbourne, Australia, and also participated in the World Cups of 1958 and 1962. He went on to make 41 senior international appearances, scoring 6 goals.

A highlight of his international career was the 1960 European Nations' Cup, where Šekularac earned the spot in the Team of the Tournament. Forty years later, he reminisced on the matches:

"Do I remember that match? To this day, I dream about it. We had a great team that won over the French fans. Against the home side, I took part in one of the best games in the history of football. I was convinced that the trophy would be in our hands. Against the Russians, we've never had luck. It was like that in the final match as well. I remember that we missed a few goal chances and that the Russians at times during the match were totally inferior. That Ponedelnik however was without mercy. He scored on us and prevented us from celebrating our (potentially) biggest triumph."

He played his final international in June 1966 against Bulgaria.

== Playing style ==
He was known for his speed, ball control, and technical ability. His style of play, which emphasized creativity and individual skill, contributed to his popularity among spectators. During the early 1960s, he was a prominent figure in Yugoslav football and became widely recognized within the country.

In addition to the swelling of praise and accolades for his skills, he also attracted criticism over lack of team play and overall attitude on the pitch that some found to be disrespectful to the game. Others point to his lack of effectiveness and a seeming disproportion between his talent and his overall career statistics.

== Coaching career ==
=== Guatemala national team ===
Šekularac was head coach of the Guatemala national team for eighteen months from 1984 to 1985. Under Šekularac, Guatemala was undefeated in 36 home matches but narrowly missed out on the 1986 World Cup after losing away to Canada in a decisive 1985 CONCACAF Championship match.

=== Serbian White Eagles FC ===
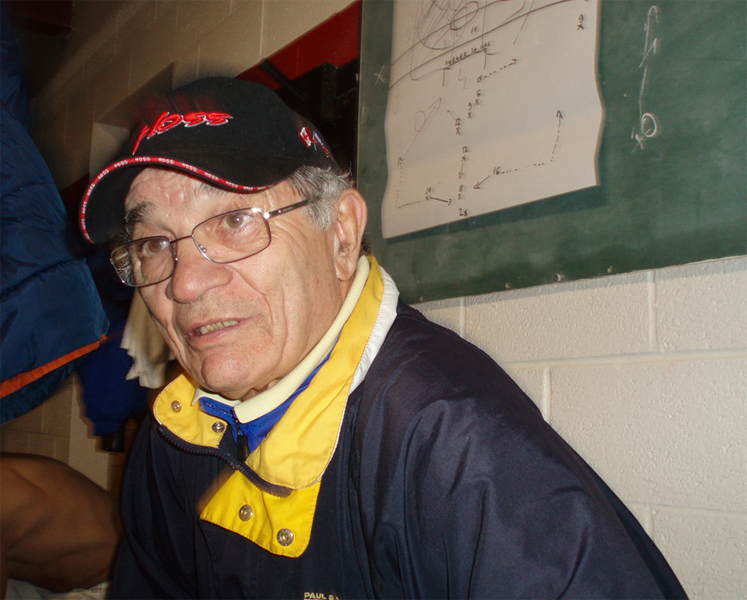
Šekularac as coach of Serbian White Eagles in 2006

In February 2006, prior to the start of the 2006 Canadian Soccer League season, it was announced that Šekularac would once again become head coach of the expansion Serbian White Eagles, re-founded in February of the same year, with first assistant being Stevan Mojsilović. With seasoned internationals being brought over from Serbia and the rest of Europe, the team was set.

The stint, though short-lived, was not without success. The club was a hit in its first season, finishing first in the International Conference with 55 points and first overall (tallying both conferences). In the regular season, Šeki guided the club to 17 wins, 4 ties and 1 loss with a whopping goal differential of 66:13.

The Eagles advanced to the knockout-stage, easily beating Toronto Supra Portuguese in the quarterfinals with a score of 3-0 and also easily beating the Windsor Border Stars in the semifinal 6–1. The season was almost brought to a happy end but the Serbian White Eagles lost to the Italia Shooters in the final by a score of 1–0.

== Personal life ==
Šekularac had a son named Marko and three daughters named Aleksandra (nicknamed Sanja), Ivana and Katja. He had a younger brother named Mirko (born 1941) who was also a footballer. Mirko’s grandson Kristian is also a professional footballer.

Along with Serbian, English and Spanish, Šekularac also spoke conversational Portuguese.

Šekularac was a keen chess player. At the age of 81, only weeks before his death, he drew his game in a simultaneous exhibition against Anatoly Karpov in Valjevo.

=== In popular culture ===
- Šekularac was probably the first sports superstar in Yugoslavia whose fame transcended sporting bounds. The popularity he enjoyed during his playing heyday was such that he even starred in a 1962 full-length comedy feature Šeki snima, pazi se – a football-related movie built around his public persona.
- In 2006, a biography of Šekularac titled Čovek za sva vremena (The All-Time Man) by Dušan Popović was published in Belgrade
- In 2011, Šekularac (along with Serbian sports journalist Jovo Vuković) wrote an autobiography titled Ja, Šeki (I, Šeki). The book was also published in Belgrade.

== Death and legacy ==
Šekularac died on 5 January 2019 in Belgrade, Serbia. He is interred in the Alley of Distinguished Citizens in the Belgrade New Cemetery in a joint grave with Milunka Lazarević, next to the grave of actor Božidar Stošić and across the graves of Ranko Žeravica and Branislav Pokrajac.

The Serbian White Eagles Academy was posthumously named in his honour.

== Honours ==
=== Player ===
Red Star Belgrade

- Yugoslav First League: 1955–56, 1956–57, 1958–59, 1959–60, 1963–64
- Yugoslav Cup: 1957–58, 1958–59, 1963–64

Independiente Santa Fe

- Categoría Primera A: 1971
- Copa Simón Bolívar: 1970

Yugoslavia

- Summer Olympics Second place: 1956
- UEFA European Championship runner-up: 1960

Individual

- UEFA European Championship Team of the Tournament: 1960

=== Manager ===
Red Star Belgrade

- Yugoslav First League: 1989–90
- Yugoslav Cup: 1989–90

Heidelberg United

- NSL Cup: 1992–93

Serbian White Eagles

- Canadian Soccer League (International Division): 2006
- Canadian Soccer League (Play-offs): 2006 (runner-up)

== Sources ==
- Janković, Dobrivoje (2017). Beskrajni Šekularac. Belgrade: Službeni glasnik. ISBN 9788651920199.
