= Bruno Rodzik =

French footballer (1935-1998)

Personal information
- Full name: Bruno Rodzik
- Date of birth: 29 May 1935
- Place of birth: Giraumont, France
- Date of death: 12 April 1998 (aged 62)
- Place of death: Thionville
- Position: Defender

Senior career*
Years	Team	Apps	(Gls)
1957–1964	Reims	197	(3)
1964–1968	Nice	91	(0)
Total		288	(3)

International career
1960–1963	France	21	(0)
- * Club domestic league appearances and goals

Bruno Rodzik (29 May 1935 – 12 April 1998) was a French former football defender. He played for France in the Euro 1960.

== International career ==
Rodzik was born in France and was of Polish descent. He was an international footballer for the France national football team.

== Titles ==
- French championship in 1958, 1960, 1962 with Stade de Reims
- European Cup runner-up in 1959 with Stade de Reims
