= Sedmorica mladih =

Yugoslav musical group

- Also known as: 7 mladih
- Origin: Belgrade, Serbia, Yugoslavia
- Genres: Pop
- Years active: 1959 – 1999
- Labels: ZKP RTLJ, Jugoton, PGP-RTB, Jugodisk
- Past members: Nebojša Dančević; Milutin Vasović; Ljubiša Stošić; Branislav Todorović; Zarije Raković; Ljubiša Milić; Vladislav Vasilić; Jovan Radovanović; Nebojša Kunić

Sedmorica mladih (Serbian Cyrillic: Седморица младих; trans. Seven Young Men, also 7 mladih) was a former Yugoslav pop rock band from Belgrade.

In 1991 they entered the Guinness Book of Records as an ensemble that played continuously for 33 years.

Sold out Vatroslav Lisinski Concert Hall 14 times in a row and Berliner Philharmonie 7 times in a row.

First Yugoslavian showbiz group that toured USSR after Stalin's death.

Played for cosmonauts Gagarin and Titov the night before Gagarin's deadly plane crash.

In Norilsk, Russia they played 17 concerts in only 3 days.

Tito loved them. Personally freed them of military service. They were with him the night before surgery and death with his family and couple of generals.

Fidel Castro offered them boat filled with Cuban cigars.

== Gallery ==
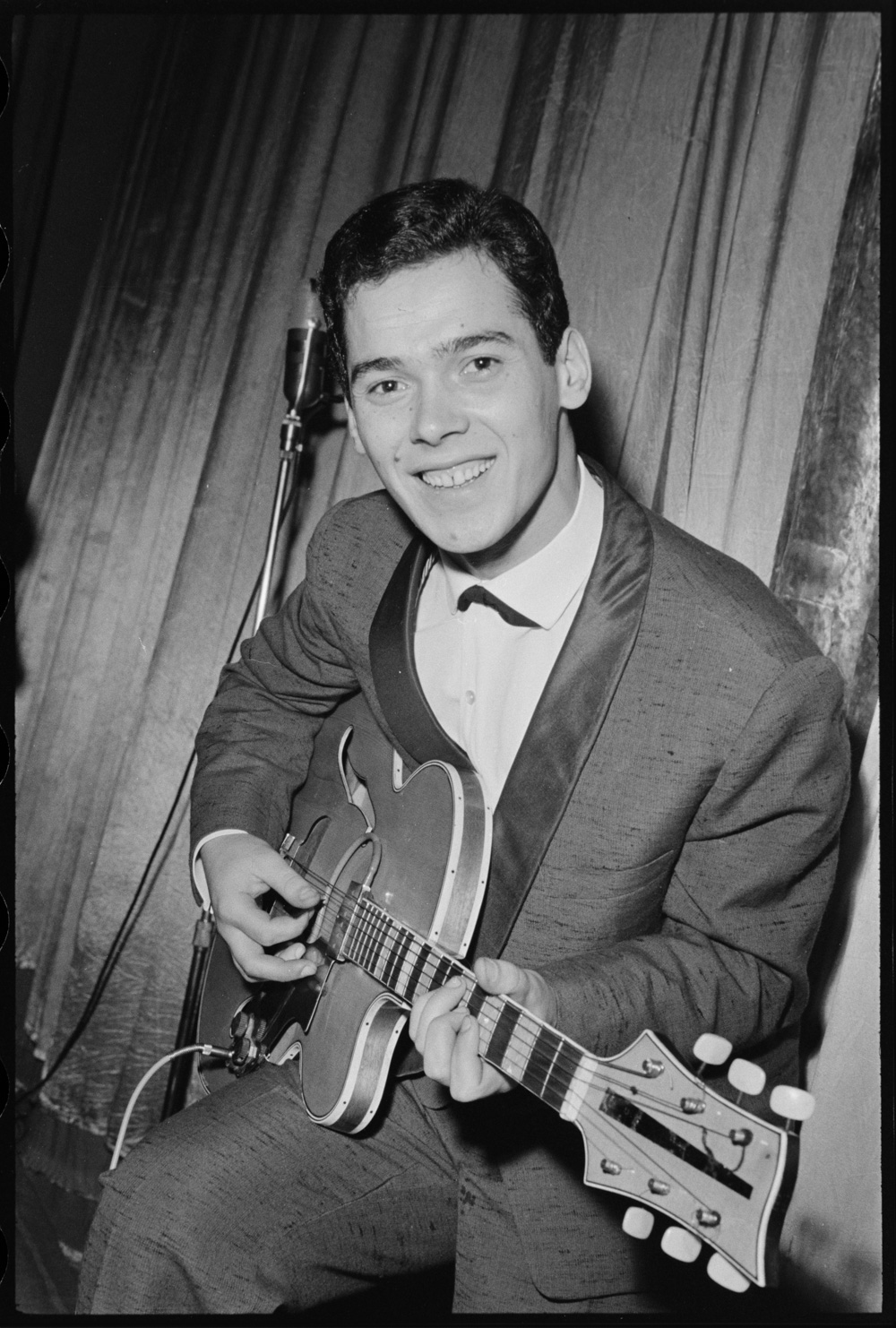
Milutin Vasović on guitar

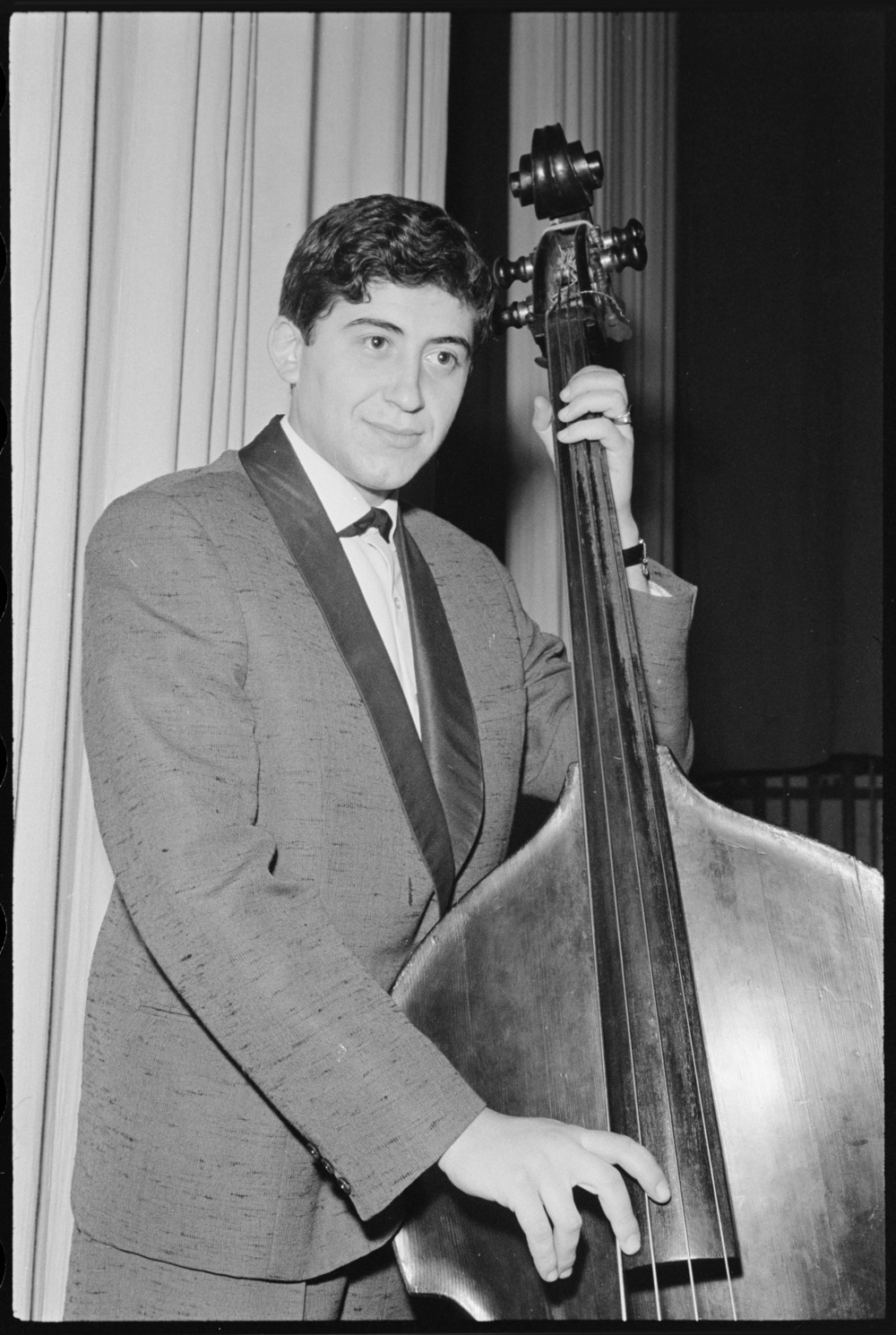
Ljubiša Stošić on bass

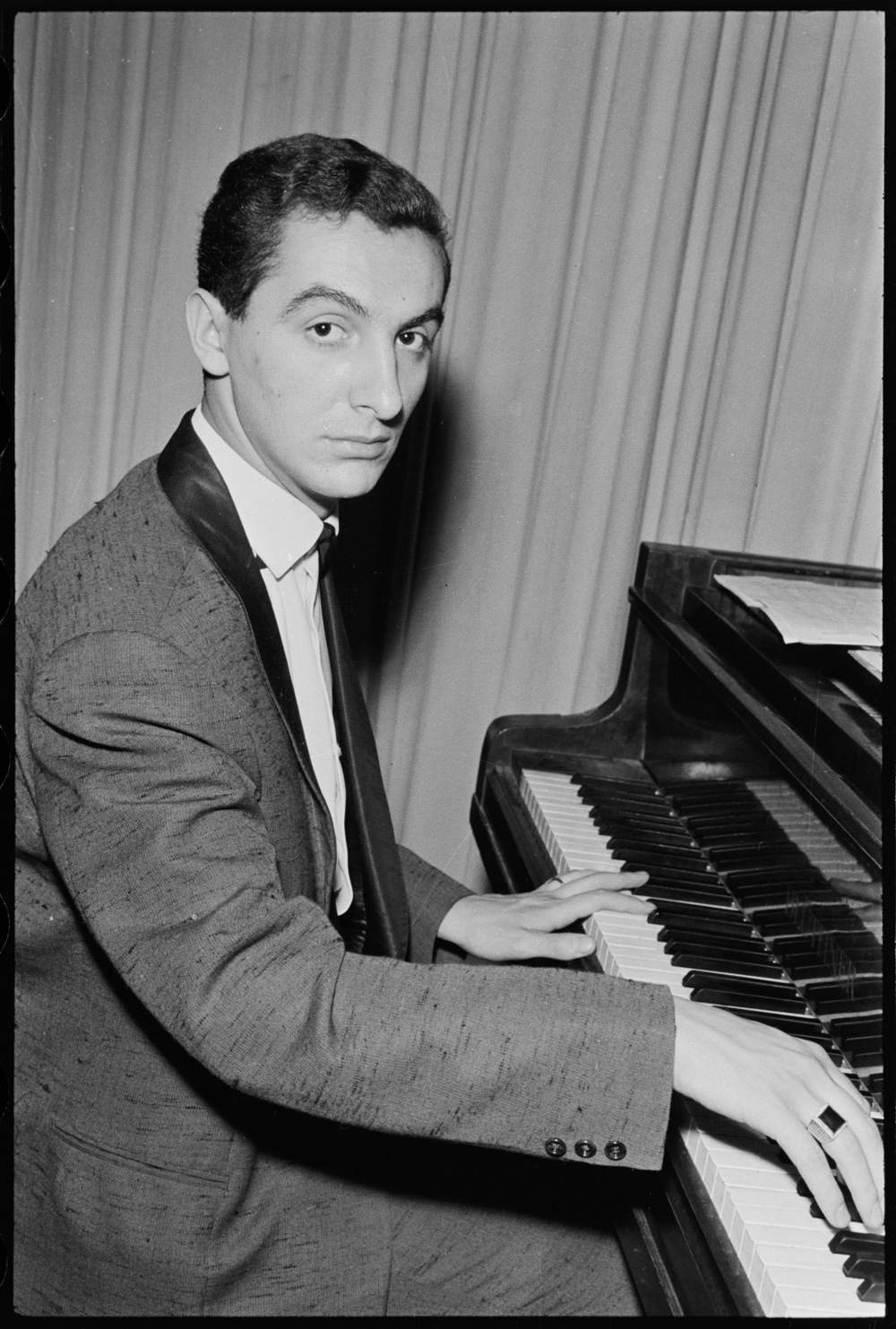
Nebojša Dančević on piano

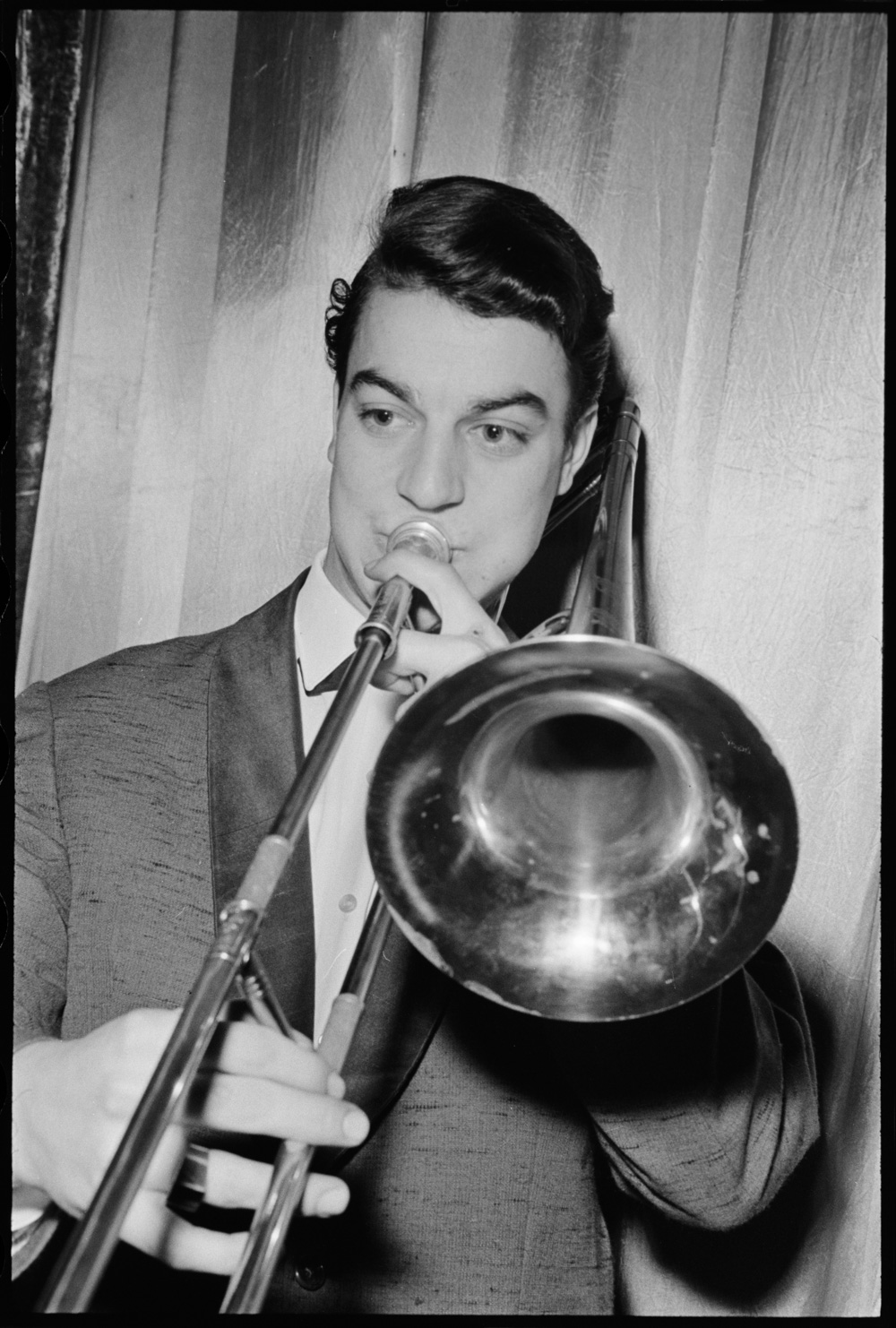
Ljubiša Milić on trombone

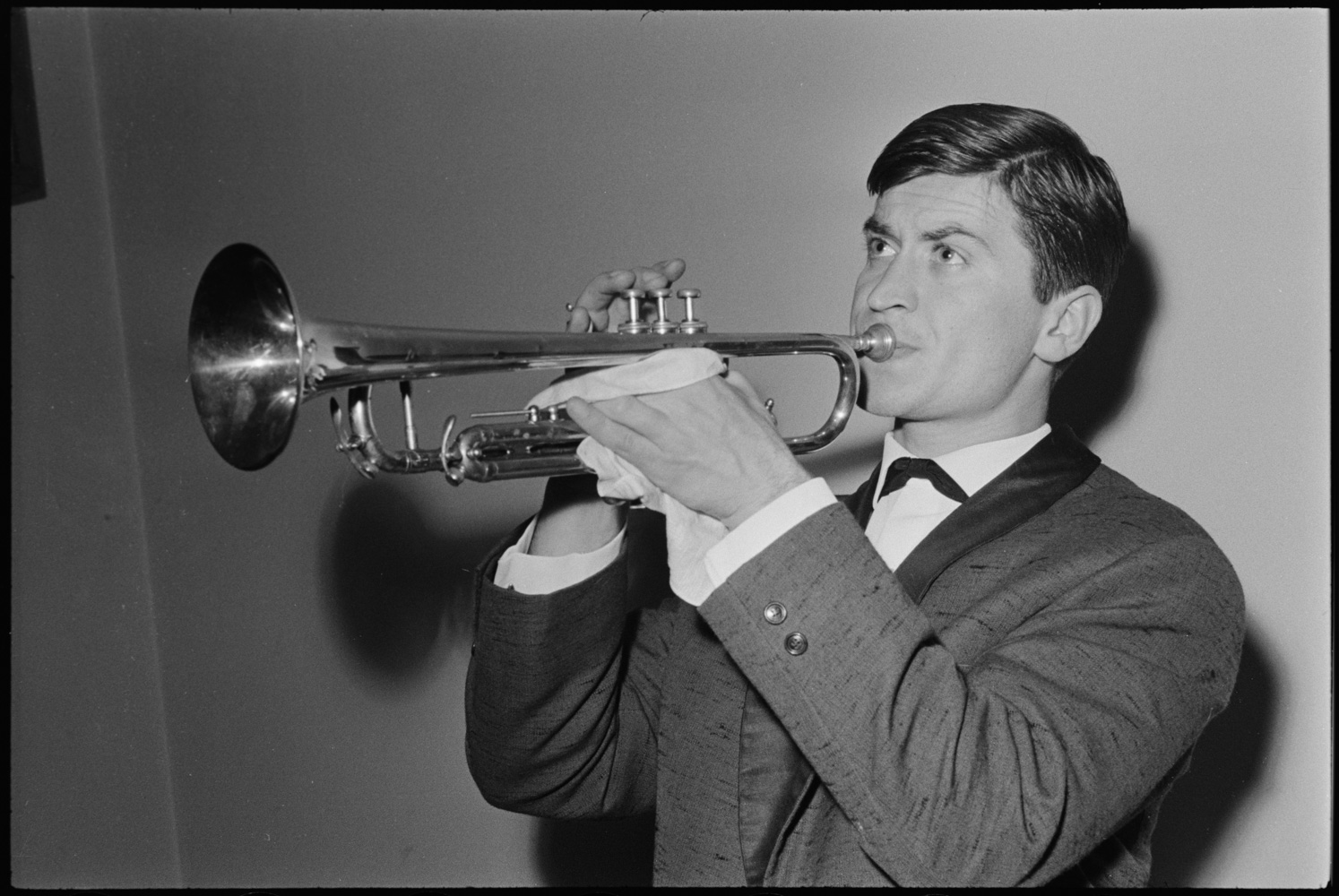
Zoran Zarije Raković on trumpet

== Sources ==
- EX YU ROCK enciklopedija 1960-2006, Janjatović Petar; ISBN 978-86-905317-1-4
