= Georges Lamia =

French footballer (1933-2014)

Personal information
- Full name: Georges Lamia
- Date of birth: 14 March 1933
- Place of birth: La Calle, French Algeria
- Date of death: 10 March 2014 (aged 80)
- Place of death: Nice
- Height: 1.69 m (5 ft 7 in)
- Position: Goalkeeper

Youth career
- RC La Calle
- JBAC
- 1956–1957: Nice

Senior career*
Years	Team	Apps	(Gls)
1957–1963	Nice		
1963–1966	Rennes		

International career
1959–1962	France	7	(0)
- * Club domestic league appearances and goals

Georges Lamia (14 March 1933 – 10 March 2014) was a French former football goalkeeper. He played for France at the Euro 1960. He died on 10 March 2014, aged 80, from natural causes.
