= Dragomir Nikolić =

Serbian football manager

Dragomir Nikolić was a Serbian football manager. He was joint head coach of the Yugoslavia national football team together with Aleksandar Tirnanić and Ljubomir Lovrić from 1959 to 1961.
