= Anatoly Krutikov =

Russian footballer and manager (1933–2019)

Personal information
- Full name: Anatoly Fyodorovich Krutikov
- Date of birth: 21 September 1933
- Place of birth: Slepushkino, Moscow Oblast, USSR
- Date of death: 8 November 2019 (aged 86)
- Height: 1.75 m (5 ft 9 in)
- Position: Defender

Senior career*
| Years | Team | Apps | (Gls) |
| 1952–1953 | Khimik Moscow | | |
| 1954–1958 | CDSA Moscow aka CSK MO Moscow | 34 | (0) |
| 1959–1969 | FC Spartak Moscow | 269 | (9) |

International career
| 1959–1960 | USSR | 9 | (0) |

Managerial career
- 1975: FC Spartak Nalchik
- 1976: FC Spartak Moscow
- 1977: FC Shakhter Karagandy
- 1979: FC Spartak Nalchik
Medal record
Representing Soviet Union
UEFA European Championship
| Winner | 1960 France |
- * Club domestic league appearances and goals

Anatoly Fyodorovich Krutikov (Russian: Анатолий Фёдорович Крутиков; 21 September 1933 – 8 November 2019) was a Russian footballer and manager.

== Club career ==
Krutikov played in nearly 300 Soviet league matches for FC Spartak Moscow, winning the Soviet Top League in 1962 and the Soviet Cup in 1963 and 1965.

== International career ==
He earned 9 caps for the USSR national football team, and participated in the first ever European Nations' Cup in 1960, where the Soviets were champions. He was selected for the 1964 European Nations' Cup squad, but did not play in any games at the tournament.

== Coaching career ==
He has the dubious distinction of being the only FC Spartak Moscow coach to get the team relegated from the top division in USSR or Russia (in 1976).

On 8 November 2019, FC Spartak Moscow announced that Krutikov had died.

== Honours ==
- Soviet Top League winner: 1962.
- Soviet Cup winner: 1963, 1965.
