= Anatoli Maslyonkin =

Russian footballer

Personal information
- Full name: Anatoli Yevstigneyevich Maslyonkin
- Date of birth: June 29, 1930
- Place of birth: Moscow, USSR
- Date of death: May 16, 1988 (aged 57)
- Place of death: Moscow, USSR
- Height: 1.78 m (5 ft 10 in)
- Positions: Defender; midfielder

Senior career*
| Years | Team | Apps | (Gls) |
| 1954–1963 | FC Spartak Moscow | 216 | (8) |
| 1964–1966 | FC Shinnik Yaroslavl | 89 | (0) |
| Total | | 305 | (8) |

International career
| 1955–1962 | USSR | 33 | (1) |
Medal record
Representing Soviet Union
Association football at Summer Olympics
| Gold medal – first place | 1956 Melbourne |
UEFA European Championship
| Winner | 1960 France |
- * Club domestic league appearances and goals

Olympic medal record

Representing Soviet Union

Men's Football
| Gold medal – first place | 1956 Melbourne | Team competition |

Anatoli Yevstigneyevich Maslyonkin (Russian: Анатолий Евстигнеевич Маслёнкин; June 29, 1930 – May 16, 1988) was a Soviet Russian footballer.

== Honours ==
- Soviet Top League winner: 1956, 1958, 1962.
- Soviet Cup winner: 1958.

== International career ==
He earned 33 caps for the USSR national football team, and participated in two World Cups, as well as the first ever European Nations' Cup in 1960, where the Soviets were champions. He also won a gold medal in Football at the 1956 Summer Olympics.
