= François Heutte =

French footballer (born 1938)

Personal information
- Full name: François Heutte
- Date of birth: 21 February 1938 (age 88)
- Place of birth: Chaumont-en-Vexin, France
- Position: Striker

Senior career*
Years	Team	Apps	(Gls)
1955–1957	Rouen	33	(12)
1957–1959	Lille	64	(21)
1959–1964	RC Paris	135	(47)
1964–1965	Saint-Etienne	24	(8)
1965–1966	Lille	31	(13)
1966–1967	Reims	33	(9)
1967–1969	Clermont	60	(40)
1969–1972	RC Paris		

International career
1959–1961	France	9	(4)
- * Club domestic league appearances and goals

François Heutte (born 21 February 1938) is a French former football striker. He appeared for France in the first edition of the 1960 European Nations' Cup tournament, in which they finished fourth. For 4 years he was the European Championship top goalscorer with 2 goals, until in 1964 Viktor Ponedelnik got his third goal.
