= Ljubomir Lovrić =

Serbian footballer

Personal information
- Date of birth: 28 May 1920
- Place of birth: Novi Sad, Kingdom of Serbs, Croats and Slovenes
- Date of death: 26 August 1994 (aged 74)
- Place of death: Belgrade, Serbia, FR Yugoslavia
- Position: Goalkeeper

Youth career
- 1934–1937: Jugoslavija

Senior career*
Years	Team	Apps	(Gls)
1937–1944	Jugoslavija		
1945–1952	Red Star Belgrade	241	(0)

International career
1939–1948	Yugoslavia	5	(0)

Managerial career
- 1959–1964: Yugoslavia
Medal record
Men's Football
Representing Yugoslavia
Olympic Games
Silver medal – second place	1948 London	Team
- * Club domestic league appearances and goals

Ljubomir Lovrić (Serbian Cyrillic: Љубомир Ловрић; 28 May 1920 – 26 August 1994) was a Yugoslav football goalkeeper and later a football manager and journalist.

== Career ==
On the national level he played for Yugoslavia national team (5 matches) and was a participant at the 1948 Olympic Games, where his team won a silver medal. Lovrić later worked as a journalist and football manager, he coached Yugoslavia at the 1962 FIFA World Cup.
