= Yugoslavia national football team =

Former men's national association football team representing Yugoslavia

(Socialist Federal Republic of Yugoslavia) Yugoslavia
1920–1992
- Nickname(s): Plavi (The Blues); Jadranske ajkule (The Adriatic Sharks); Brazilci Evrope (The Brazilians of Europe)
- Association: Football Association of Yugoslavia
- Most caps: Dragan Džajić (85)
- Top scorer: Stjepan Bobek (38)
- Home stadium: Stadium Rajko Mitić, Belgrade
- FIFA code: YUG
First colours	Second colours

First international
- Czechoslovakia 7–0 Kingdom of SCS (Antwerp, Belgium; 28 August 1920)

Last international
- Netherlands 2–0 Yugoslavia (Amsterdam, Netherlands; 25 March 1992) (Note: As of 1992 before the split of SFR Yugoslavia; for later data see FR Yugoslavia national football team.)

Biggest win
- Yugoslavia 10–0 Venezuela (Curitiba, Brazil; 14 June 1972)

Biggest defeat
- Czechoslovakia 7–0 Kingdom of SCS (Antwerp, Belgium; 28 August 1920); Uruguay 7–0 Kingdom of SCS (Paris, France; 26 May 1924); Czechoslovakia 7–0 Kingdom of SCS (Prague, Czechoslovakia; 28 October 1925)

World Cup
- Appearances: 8 (first in 1930)
- Best result: Fourth place (1930, 1962)

European Championship
- Appearances: 4 (first in 1960)
- Best result: Runners-up (1960, 1968)

Olympic Games
- Appearances: 11 (first in 1920)
- Best result: Gold medal (1960)
Medal record
Men's football
UEFA European Championship
Silver medal – second place	1960 France	Team
Silver medal – second place	1968 Italy	Team
Olympic Games
Gold medal – first place	1960 Rome	Team
Silver medal – second place	1948 London	Team
Silver medal – second place	1952 Helsinki	Team
Silver medal – second place	1956 Melbourne	Team
Bronze medal – third place	1984 Los Angeles	Team
Balkan Cup
Gold medal – first place	1934–35 Greece	Team
Gold medal – first place	1935 Bulgaria	Team
Mediterranean Games
Gold medal – first place	1971 İzmir	Team
Gold medal – first place	1979 Split	Team

The Yugoslavia national football team (Note: Serbian: Фудбалска репрезентација Југославије, Fudbalska reprezentacija Jugoslavije; Croatian: Jugoslavenska nogometna reprezentacija; Slovene: Jugoslovanska nogometna reprezentanca; Macedonian: Фудбалска репрезентација на Југославија, romanized: Fudbalska reprezentacija na Jugoslavija) represented Yugoslavia in international association football.

Although the team mainly represented the pre-war Kingdom of Yugoslavia and the post-war SFR Yugoslavia, various iterations of the state were formally constituted in football, including the:

- Kingdom of Serbs, Croats and Slovenes (1918–1929)
- Kingdom of Yugoslavia (1929–1945)
- Democratic Federal Yugoslavia (1945)
- Federal People's Republic of Yugoslavia (1945–1963)
- Socialist Federal Republic of Yugoslavia (1963–1992)

It enjoyed success in international competition, reaching the semi-finals (Note: 1930 World Cup didn't feature a match for the third place. Retroactively, FIFA established rankings based on overall tournament record, placing Yugoslavia at the fourth place) at the 1930 and 1962 FIFA World Cups. In 1992, during the Yugoslav wars, the team was suspended from international competition as part of the United Nations sanctions on Yugoslavia.

== History ==
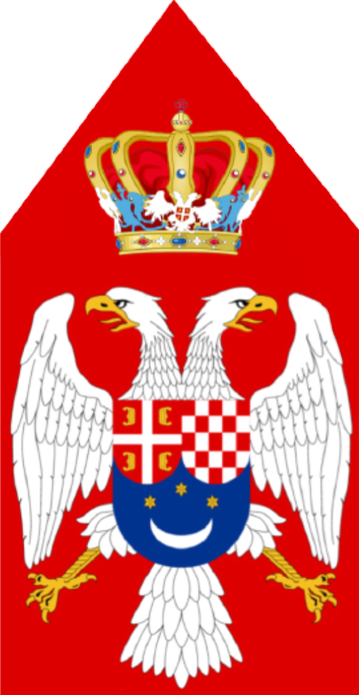
The logo of the team before the Second World War

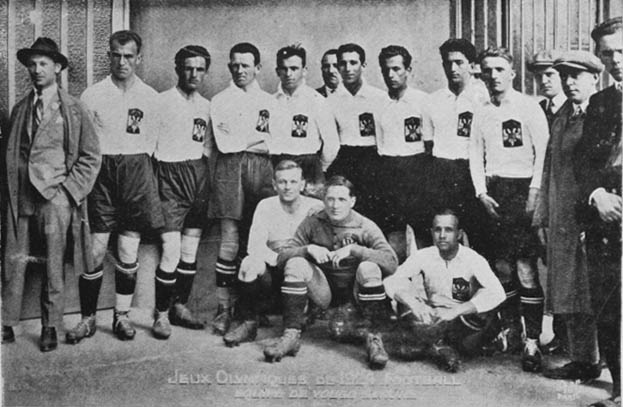
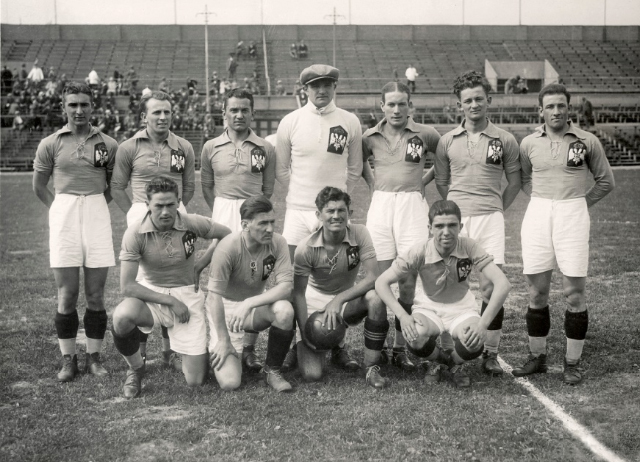
The Kingdom of Serbs, Croats and Slovenes at the Summer Olympics in 1924 (left) and 1928 (right)

The first national team was in the kingdom that existed between the two world wars. The Football Federation of what was then the Kingdom of Serbs, Croats and Slovenes was founded in Zagreb in 1919 under the name Jugoslavenski nogometni savez (and admitted into FIFA), and the national team played its first international game at the Summer Olympics in Antwerp in 1920. The opponent was Czechoslovakia, and the historic starting eleven that represented Kingdom of SCS on its debut were: Dragutin Vrđuka, Vjekoslav Župančić, Jaroslav Šifer, Stanko Tavčar, Slavin Cindrić, Rudolf Rupec, Dragutin Vragović, Artur Dubravčić, Emil Perška, Ivan Granec, and Jovan Ružić. They lost by a huge margin 0–7, but nonetheless got their names in the history books.

=== 1930 World Cup ===
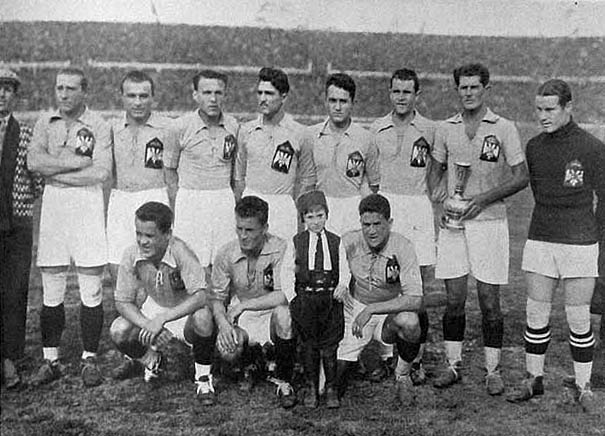
A Yugoslavia line-up at the 1930 FIFA World Cup

In 1929, the country was renamed to Yugoslavia and the football association became Fudbalski savez Jugoslavije and ordered to move its headquarters from Zagreb to Belgrade. The national team participated at the 1930 FIFA World Cup, finishing in fourth place. In its first ever World Cup match in Montevideo's Parque Central, Yugoslavia managed a famous 2–1 win versus mighty Brazil, with the following starting eleven representing the country: Milovan Jakšić, Branislav Sekulić, Aleksandar Tirnanić, Milutin Ivković, Ivica Bek, Momčilo Đokić, Blagoje Marjanović, Milorad Arsenijević, Đorđe Vujadinović, Dragoslav Mihajlović, and Ljubiša Stefanović. The team was the youngest squad at the inaugural World Cup at an average age of just under 22 years old, and became quite popular among the Uruguayan public, who dubbed them "Los Ichachos". The national team consisted of players based in Serbian football clubs, while the Zagreb Subassociation forbid players from Croatian clubs, some of whom were regulars in the national team until then, to play in the World Cup due to the relocation of football association's headquarters from Zagreb to Belgrade.

=== Post-World War II period ===
The federation and football overall was disrupted by World War II. After the war, a socialist federation was formed and the football federation reconstituted. It was one of the founding members of the UEFA in 1954.

=== Silver Medal at 1948 Summer Olympics ===
Yugoslavia began their football campaign by defeating Luxembourg 6–1, with five different players scoring the goals. In the quarter-finals and the semi-finals, they would take out Turkey and Great Britain by the same score of 3–1. In the final though, they would lose to Sweden.

=== Silver Medal at 1952 Summer Olympics ===
Having a team with many players from the 1948 generation, Yugoslavia was a formidable side at the 1952 Summer Olympics and finished as runners-up behind the famous "Golden Team" representing Hungary. Against the USSR, Yugoslavia was 5–1 up with 15 minutes of their first round match to go. The Yugoslavs, understandably, put their feet up. Arthur Ellis, the match referee, recorded what happened next in his book, The Final Whistle (London, 1963): "The USSR forced the most honourable draw ever recorded! [Vsevolod] Bobrov, their captain, scored a magnificent hat-trick. After the USSR had reduced the lead to 5–2, he, almost single-handed, took the score to 5–5, scoring his third in the last minute. For once, use of the word sensational was justified." Although Bobrov's early goal in their replay presaged a miraculous recovery, Yugoslavia recovered sufficiently to put out their opponents easily in the second half.

=== Later decades ===
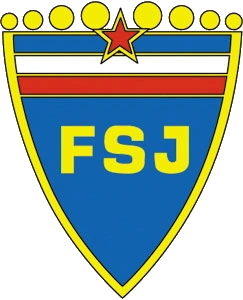
The logo until 1990

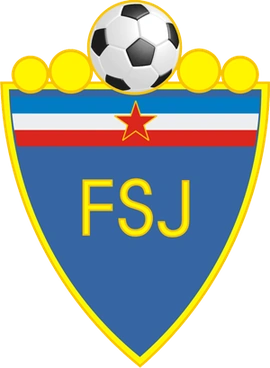
The logo in 1991

In 1976, Yugoslavia organized the European Championship played in Belgrade and Zagreb. The national team participated in eight World Cups and four Euros, won the Olympic football tournament in 1960 at the Summer Games (they also finished second three times and third once), and developed a reputation for skillful and attacking football, leading them to be dubbed "the Brazilians of Europe".

Dragan Džajić holds the record for the most national team caps at 85, between 1964 and 1979. The best scorer is Stjepan Bobek with 38 goals, between 1946 and 1956.

=== Dissolution and UN embargo ===
During the collapse of communism in Europe, Yugoslavia's republics introduced multiparty politics and held elections in 1990. During the same time, conflicts between the republics and the national communities intensified and federal institutions weakened. Just weeks after the first Croatian elections and after a Dinamo Zagreb-Red Star riot at the same stadium, at the Yugoslavia-Netherlands friendly in preparation for the 1990 World Cup, the Croatian crowd in Zagreb jeered the Yugoslav team and anthem and waved Dutch flags (owing to its resemblance to the Croatian tricolour). With the dissolution of Yugoslavia, the team split up and players joined the newly emerging national teams. The Belgrade-based team of the Federal Republic of Yugoslavia (FRY) was banned from competing at Euro 92 under UN sanctions. The decision was made on 31 May 1992, just 10 days before the competition commenced. The SFRY Yugoslav team had earned the top spot of their group during the disintegration, and the FRY team was unable to take its spot in the competition due to United Nations Security Council Resolution 757. Their place was taken by group runners-up Denmark, who went on to win the competition.

After the breakup of Yugoslavia, Serbia and Montenegro proclaimed the state of FRY, which claimed to be the continuation of the previous Yugoslavia. A claim which was not generally accepted by the international community, except by FIFA and UEFA.

In 1992, Yugoslavia had also been drawn as the second seed in Group 5 of the European Zone in the qualifying tournament for the 1994 World Cup. FRY was barred from competing, rendering the group with only five remaining members instead of six.

In 1994, when the boycott was lifted, the union of Serbia and Montenegro competed under the name "Yugoslavia", as the Federal Republic of Yugoslavia national football team. The Serbia and Montenegro national team continued under Yugoslavia's naming until 2003 when the country and team were renamed Serbia and Montenegro.

The Serbia national football team inherited Yugoslavia's spot within FIFA and UEFA and is considered by both organizations as the only successor of Yugoslavia (and of Serbia and Montenegro).

== Youth teams ==
The under-21 team won the inaugural UEFA U-21 Championship in 1978.

The Yugoslav under-20 team won the FIFA World Youth Championship 1987.

== Kits ==
1930	1950–1968	1974	1976	1982	1984	1990	1992

== Head coaches ==
Head coach	Period	Record			
Head coach	Period	Games	Won	Drawn	Lost
(Socialist Federal Republic of Yugoslavia) Ivica Osim	1986–1992	51	27	10	14
(Socialist Federal Republic of Yugoslavia) Ivan Toplak (Socialist Federal Republic of Yugoslavia) Ivica Osim	1986	3	1	1	1
(Socialist Federal Republic of Yugoslavia) Miloš Milutinović	1984–1985	15	7	3	5
(Socialist Federal Republic of Yugoslavia) Todor Veselinović	1982–1984	18	9	3	6
(Socialist Federal Republic of Yugoslavia) Miljan Miljanić	1979–1982	22	18	2	2
(Socialist Federal Republic of Yugoslavia) Dražan Jerković	1978	1	1	0	0
(Socialist Federal Republic of Yugoslavia) Ante Mladinić	1978	2	0	0	2
(Socialist Federal Republic of Yugoslavia) Slavko Luštica	1978	0	0	0	0
(Socialist Federal Republic of Yugoslavia) Stevan Vilotić	1978	2	0	2	0
(Socialist Federal Republic of Yugoslavia) Marko Valok (Socialist Federal Republic of Yugoslavia) Stevan Vilotić (Socialist Federal Republic of Yugoslavia) Gojko Zec	1977	6	1	2	3
(Socialist Federal Republic of Yugoslavia) Ivan Toplak	1976–1977	8	2	0	6
(Socialist Federal Republic of Yugoslavia) Ante Mladinić	1974–1976	15	9	2	4
(Socialist Federal Republic of Yugoslavia) Miljan Miljanić (Socialist Federal Republic of Yugoslavia) Milan Ribar (Socialist Federal Republic of Yugoslavia) Sulejman Rebac (Socialist Federal Republic of Yugoslavia) Tomislav Ivić (Socialist Federal Republic of Yugoslavia) Milovan Ćirić	1973–1974	11	3	3	5
(Socialist Federal Republic of Yugoslavia) Vujadin Boškov	1971–1973	27	10	12	5
(Socialist Federal Republic of Yugoslavia) Rajko Mitić	1967–1970	34	13	10	11
(Socialist Federal Republic of Yugoslavia) Aleksandar Tirnanić (Socialist Federal Republic of Yugoslavia) Miljan Miljanić (Socialist Federal Republic of Yugoslavia) Rajko Mitić (Socialist Federal Republic of Yugoslavia) Vujadin Boškov (Socialist Federal Republic of Yugoslavia) Branko Stanković	1966	4	2	0	2
(Socialist Federal Republic of Yugoslavia) Aleksandar Tirnanić (Socialist Federal Republic of Yugoslavia) Miljan Miljanić	1966	2	0	1	1
(Socialist Federal Republic of Yugoslavia) Aleksandar Tirnanić (Socialist Federal Republic of Yugoslavia) Milan Antolković (Socialist Federal Republic of Yugoslavia) Miljan Miljanić	1966	3	1	0	2
(Socialist Federal Republic of Yugoslavia) Aleksandar Tirnanić (Socialist Federal Republic of Yugoslavia) Milan Antolković (Socialist Federal Republic of Yugoslavia) Miljan Miljanić (Socialist Federal Republic of Yugoslavia) Abdulah Gegić	1965	7	2	3	2
(Socialist Federal Republic of Yugoslavia) Ljubomir Lovrić	1964	11	3	1	7
(Socialist Federal Republic of Yugoslavia) Ljubomir Lovrić (Socialist Federal Republic of Yugoslavia) Hugo Ruševljanin	1963–1964	7	5	0	2
(Socialist Federal Republic of Yugoslavia) Ljubomir Lovrić (Socialist Federal Republic of Yugoslavia) Prvoslav Mihajlović (Socialist Federal Republic of Yugoslavia) Hugo Ruševljanin	1961–1963	22	15	2	5
(Socialist Federal Republic of Yugoslavia) Dragomir Nikolić (Socialist Federal Republic of Yugoslavia) Aleksandar Tirnanić (Socialist Federal Republic of Yugoslavia) Ljubomir Lovrić	1959–1961	29	16	8	5
(Socialist Federal Republic of Yugoslavia) Aleksandar Tirnanić	1955–1958	34	13	11	10
(Socialist Federal Republic of Yugoslavia) Branko Pešić (Socialist Federal Republic of Yugoslavia) Aleksandar Tirnanić (Socialist Federal Republic of Yugoslavia) Leo Lemešić (Socialist Federal Republic of Yugoslavia) Franjo Wölfl (Socialist Federal Republic of Yugoslavia) Milovan Ćirić	1954	9	5	2	2
(Socialist Federal Republic of Yugoslavia) Milorad Arsenijević (Socialist Federal Republic of Yugoslavia) Aleksandar Tirnanić (Socialist Federal Republic of Yugoslavia) Leo Lemešić	1952–1954	18	14	2	2
(Socialist Federal Republic of Yugoslavia) Milorad Arsenijević	1949–1952	23	15	3	5
(Socialist Federal Republic of Yugoslavia) Milorad Arsenijević (Socialist Federal Republic of Yugoslavia) Aleksandar Tirnanić	1946–1948	18	12	1	5
(Kingdom of Yugoslavia) Svetozar Popović	1940–1941	3	1	2	0
(Kingdom of Yugoslavia) Boško Simonović	1939–1940	4	1	1	2
(Kingdom of Yugoslavia) Svetozar Popović	1939	1	0	0	1
(Kingdom of Yugoslavia) Boško Simonović	1939	4	1	0	3
(Kingdom of Yugoslavia) Svetozar Popović	1937–1938	13	4	5	4
(Kingdom of Yugoslavia) Nikola Simić	1936	4	1	1	2
(Kingdom of Yugoslavia) Boško Simonović	1935	5	3	2	0
(Kingdom of Yugoslavia) Ivo Šuste (Kingdom of Yugoslavia) Mata Miodragović (Kingdom of Yugoslavia) Petar Pleše	1934–1935	6	3	0	3
(Kingdom of Yugoslavia) Boško Simonović	1933–1934	6	3	1	2
(Kingdom of Yugoslavia) Branislav Veljković	1933	6	3	1	2
(Kingdom of Yugoslavia) Boško Simonović	1930–1932	24	12	1	11
(Kingdom of Yugoslavia) Ante Pandaković	1926–1930	19	7	2	10
(Kingdom of Yugoslavia) Dušan Zinaja	1924–1925	3	0	0	3
(Kingdom of Yugoslavia) Todor Sekulić	1924	1	0	0	1
(Kingdom of Yugoslavia) Veljko Ugrinić	1920–1924	10	3	1	6

== Player statistics ==
=== Most appearances ===
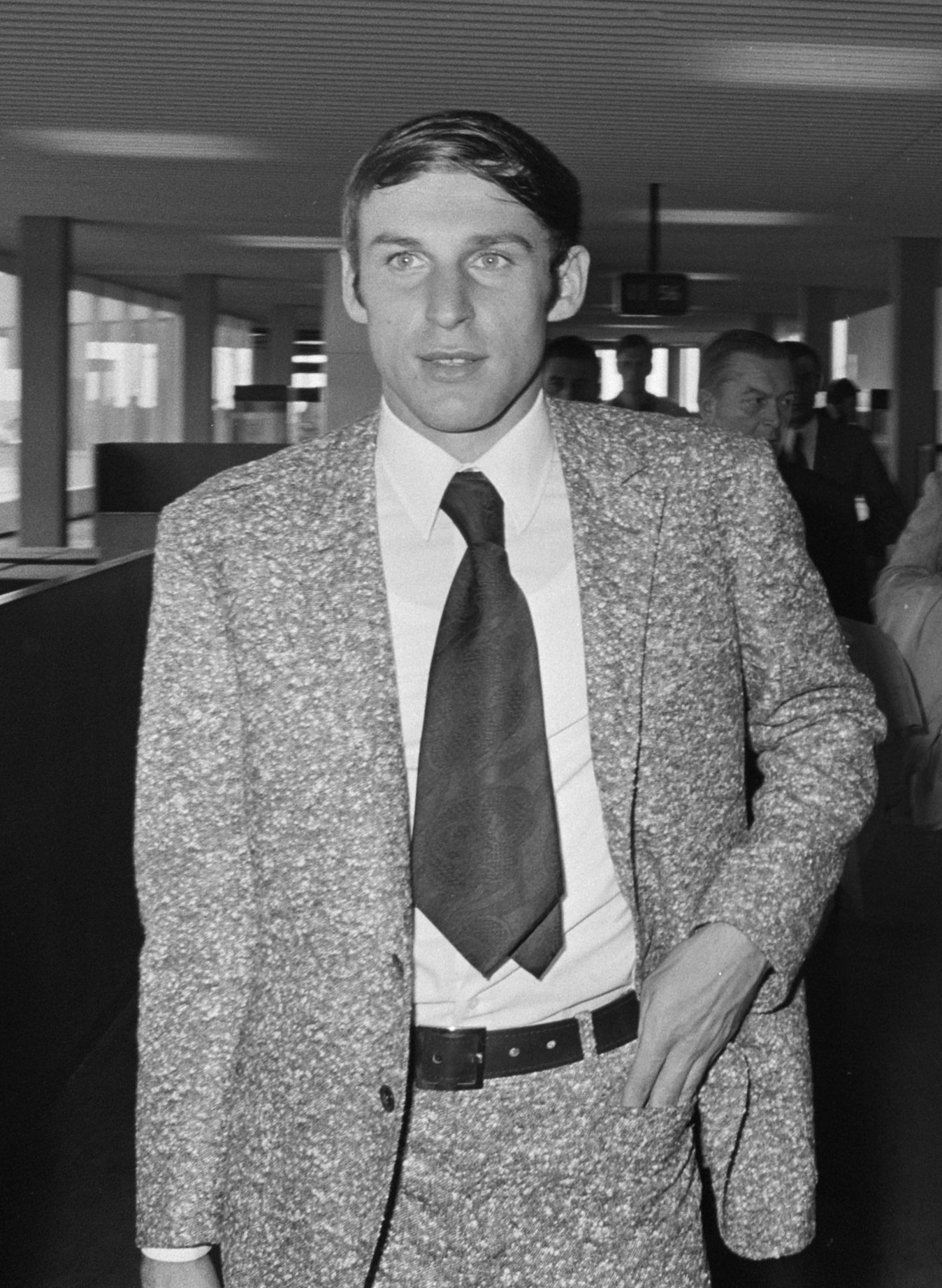
Dragan Džajić is the most capped player in the history of Yugoslavia with 85 caps.

Rank	Name	Caps	Goals	Position	Career
1	Dragan Džajić	85	23	MF	1964–1979
2	Zlatko Vujović	70	25	FW	1979–1990
3	Branko Zebec	65	17	DF	1951–1961
4	Stjepan Bobek	63	38	FW	1946–1956
5	Faruk Hadžibegić	61	6	DF	1982–1992
5	Branko Stanković	61	3	DF	1946–1956
7	Ivica Horvat	60	0	DF	1946–1956
8	Vladimir Beara	59	0	GK	1950–1959
8	Rajko Mitić	59	32	FW	1946–1957
8	Bernard Vukas	59	22	MF	1948–1957

=== Top goalscorers ===
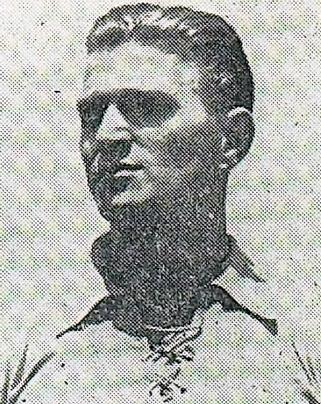
Stjepan Bobek is the top scorer in the history of Yugoslavia with 38 goals.

Rank	Name	Goals	Caps	Ratio	Career
1	Stjepan Bobek	38	63	0.60	1946–1956
2	Milan Galić	37	51	0.73	1959–1965
2	Blagoje Marjanović	37	58	0.64	1926–1938
4	Rajko Mitić	32	59	0.54	1946–1957
5	Dušan Bajević	29	37	0.78	1970–1977
6	Todor Veselinović	28	37	0.76	1953–1961
7	Borivoje Kostić	26	33	0.79	1956–1964
8	Zlatko Vujović	25	70	0.36	1970–1977
9	Dragan Džajić	23	84	0.27	1964–1979
10	Bernard Vukas	22	59	0.37	1948–1958

== Competitive record ==
=== FIFA World Cup ===
Champions Runners-up Third place Fourth place

FIFA World Cup record										Qualification record					
Year	Round	Position	Pld	W	D	L	GF	GA	Squads	Pld	W	D	L	GF	GA
(Uruguay) 1930	Fourth place (Note: Yugoslavia earned 4th place below the loser of the other semi-finals, the United States, because of a lower goal difference (0 to the United States' +1). No third place match was played.)	4th	3	2	0	1	7	7	Squad	Invited					
(Italy) 1934	Did not qualify									2	0	1	1	3	4
(France) 1938	Did not qualify									2	1	0	1	1	4
(Brazil) 1950	Group stage	5th	3	2	0	1	7	3	Squad	5	3	2	0	16	6
(Switzerland) 1954	Quarter-finals	7th	3	1	1	1	2	3	Squad	4	4	0	0	4	0
(Sweden) 1958	Quarter-finals	5th	4	1	2	1	7	7	Squad	4	2	2	0	7	2
(Chile) 1962	Fourth place	4th	6	3	0	3	10	7	Squad	4	3	1	0	11	4
(England) 1966	Did not qualify									6	3	1	2	10	8
(Mexico) 1970	Did not qualify									6	3	1	2	19	7
(West Germany) 1974	Quarter-finals (Note: Last 8 held as second group stage.)	7th	6	1	2	3	12	7	Squad	5	3	2	0	8	4
(Argentina) 1978	Did not qualify									4	1	0	3	6	8
(Spain) 1982	Group stage	16th	3	1	1	1	2	2	Squad	8	6	1	1	22	7
(Mexico) 1986	Did not qualify									8	3	2	3	7	8
(Italy) 1990	Quarter-finals	5th	5	3	1	1	8	6	Squad	8	6	2	0	16	6
Total	Fourth place	8/14	33	14	7	12	55	42	—	66	38	15	13	130	68

=== UEFA European Championship ===
Champions Runners-up Third place Fourth place

UEFA European Championship record										Qualification record					
Year	Round	Position	Pld	W	D	L	GF	GA	Squads	Pld	W	D	L	GF	GA
(France) 1960	Runners-up	2nd	2	1	0	1	6	6	Squad	4	2	1	1	9	4
(Spain) 1964	Did not qualify									4	2	1	1	6	5
(Italy) 1968	Runners-up	2nd	3	1	1	1	2	3	Squad	6	4	1	1	14	5
(Belgium) 1972	Did not qualify									8	3	4	1	7	5
(Socialist Federal Republic of Yugoslavia) 1976	Fourth place	4th	2	0	0	2	4	7	Squad	8	6	1	1	15	5
(Italy) 1980	Did not qualify									6	4	0	2	14	6
(France) 1984	Group stage	8th	3	0	0	3	2	10	Squad	6	3	2	1	12	11
(West Germany) 1988	Did not qualify									6	4	0	2	13	9
(Sweden) 1992	Banned after qualification (Note: Suspended because of United Nations Security Council Resolution 757 during the Yugoslav Wars. Yugoslavia was replaced by Denmark, who went on to win the tournament.)									8	7	0	1	24	4
Total	Runners-up	4/9	10	2	1	7	14	26	—	56	35	10	11	114	54

== Head-to-head record ==
Positive Record Neutral Record Negative Record

Opponents	Pld	W	D	L
Albania	5	4	1	0
Algeria	1	1	0	0
Argentina	6	2	1	3
Australia	1	0	0	1
Austria	17	8	4	5
Belgium	11	5	2	4
Bolivia	2	1	1	0
Brazil	14	2	6	6
Bulgaria	28	17	5	6
Chile	1	0	0	1
China	1	1	0	0
Colombia	3	3	0	0
Cyprus	4	4	0	0
Czechoslovakia	31	9	4	18
Denmark	9	7	0	2
East Germany	7	3	2	2
Ecuador	1	0	0	1
Egypt	5	4	0	1
England	14	4	5	5
Ethiopia	1	1	0	0
Faroe Islands	2	2	0	0
Finland	4	2	1	1
France	25	10	7	8
Great Britain	1	1	0	0
Greece	20	16	2	2
Honduras	1	1	0	0
Hong Kong	1	1	0	0
Hungary	29	5	9	15
India	2	2	0	0
Indonesia	3	3	0	0
Iran	2	1	1	0
Israel	9	6	1	2
Italy	18	4	6	8
Japan	2	2	0	0
Luxembourg	9	8	1	0
Mexico	4	3	0	1
Morocco	3	3	0	0
Netherlands	7	3	1	3
Northern Ireland	7	5	1	1
Norway	12	9	1	2
Paraguay	2	1	1	0
Poland	19	6	4	9
Portugal	5	2	0	3
Republic of Ireland	2	1	0	1
Romania	40	17	5	18
Saar	1	1	0	0
Scotland	8	1	5	2
South Korea	3	3	0	0
Soviet Union	17	2	4	11
Spain	16	5	4	7
Sweden	11	5	2	4
Switzerland	9	5	2	2
Tunisia	4	3	0	1
Turkey	11	7	3	1
United Arab Emirates	1	1	0	0
United States	1	1	0	0
Uruguay	5	2	0	3
Venezuela	1	1	0	0
Wales	7	4	3	0
West Germany and Germany1908-1942	24	9	4	11
Zaire	1	1	0	0

== Honours ==
=== Global ===
- Olympic Games
  - Gold medal: 1960
  - Silver medal: 1948, 1952, 1956
  - Bronze medal: 1984

=== Continental ===
- UEFA European Championship
  - Runners-up: 1960, 1968

=== Regional ===
- Balkan Cup
  - Champions: 1934–35, 1935
- Mediterranean Games
  - Gold medal: 1971, 1979

=== Summary ===
Competition	1st place, gold medalist(s)	2nd place, silver medalist(s)	3rd place, bronze medalist(s)	Total
Olympic Games	1	3	1	5
UEFA European Championship	0	2	0	2
Total	1	5	1	7

== See also ==
- List of Yugoslavia international footballers
- List of Yugoslavia national football team goalscorers
- Yugoslavia national football team results (1920–1941)
- Yugoslavia national football team results (1946–1969)
- Yugoslavia national football team results (1970–1992)
- Yugoslavia national under-21 football team
- Yugoslavia national under-20 football team

=== Teams from successor states ===
- Bosnia and Herzegovina national football team (member of UEFA and FIFA since 1990s)
- Croatia national football team (member of UEFA and FIFA since 1990s)
- Slovenia national football team (member of UEFA and FIFA since 1990s)
- North Macedonia national football team (member of UEFA and FIFA since 1990s)
- Serbia and Montenegro national football team (considered successor of Yugoslavia by UEFA and FIFA), later:
  - Montenegro national football team (member of UEFA and FIFA since 2006)
  - Serbia national football team (considered successor of Serbia and Montenegro, as Serbia since 2008)
- Kosovo national football team (member of UEFA and FIFA since 2016)

== Bibliography ==
- Gigi Riva (2016). L'ultimo rigore di Faruk. Una storia di calcio e di guerra [The Faruk's last penalty. A story about football and war] (in Italian). Palermo: Sellerio. ISBN 978-8838935640.
