= 1960 European Nations' Cup =

European association football championship

Coupe d'Europe des nations de football France 1960 (in French)

Tournament details
- Host country: France
- Dates: 6–10 July
- Teams: 4
- Venues: 2 (in 2 host cities)

Final positions
- Champions: Soviet Union (1st title)
- Runners-up: Yugoslavia
- Third place: Czechoslovakia
- Fourth place: France

Tournament statistics
- Matches played: 4
- Goals scored: 17 (4.25 per match)
- Attendance: 78,958 (19,740 per match)
- Top scorer(s): (France) François Heutte (Soviet Union) Valentin Ivanov (Soviet Union) Viktor Ponedelnik (Socialist Federal Republic of Yugoslavia) Milan Galić (Socialist Federal Republic of Yugoslavia) Dražan Jerković (2 goals each)

The 1960 European Nations' Cup was the inaugural tournament of the UEFA European Championship, held every four years and organised by UEFA. The first tournament was held in France. It was won by the Soviet Union, who beat Yugoslavia 2–1 in Paris after extra time.

The tournament was a knockout competition, with just 17 teams entering. There were some notable absences, including West Germany, Italy, Netherlands and England, each of whom had voted against the creation of the tournament in 1957. The entrants would play home-and-away matches until the semi-finals; the final four teams would then move on to the final tournament, whose host was selected after the teams became known.

In the quarter-finals, Spain, who were under Francoist rule, refused to travel to the Soviet Union for political reasons. After a proposal to play the tie over one leg at a neutral venue was rejected by the Soviets, Spain was disqualified: accordingly, three of the final four teams were from communist countries: the USSR, Czechoslovakia, and SFR Yugoslavia, to go with hosts France.

In the semi-finals, the Soviets made easy work of the Czechoslovaks in Marseille, beating them 3–0. The other match saw a nine-goal thriller as Yugoslavia came on top 5–4 after coming back from a two-goal deficit twice. Czechoslovakia beat the French 2–0 for third place.

In the final, Yugoslavia scored first, but the Soviet Union, led by legendary goalkeeper Lev Yashin, equalised in the 49th minute. After 90 minutes the score was 1–1, and Viktor Ponedelnik scored with seven minutes left in extra time to give the Soviets the inaugural European Championship.

== Qualified teams ==
Team	Qualified as	Qualified on
France (host)	Quarter-finals winner	27 March 1960
Yugoslavia	Quarter-finals winner	22 May 1960
Soviet Union	Quarter-finals winner (Note: Won by walkover after the withdrawal of Spain.)	28 May 1960
Czechoslovakia	Quarter-finals winner	29 May 1960

== Venues ==
1960 European Nations' Cup is located in France	Paris	Marseille
1960 European Nations' Cup is located in France	Parc des Princes	Stade Vélodrome
1960 European Nations' Cup is located in France	Capacity: 40,000	Capacity: 40,000

== Match officials ==
Country	Referee
England	Arthur Ellis
Belgium	Gaston Grandain
Italy	Cesare Jonni

== Final tournament ==
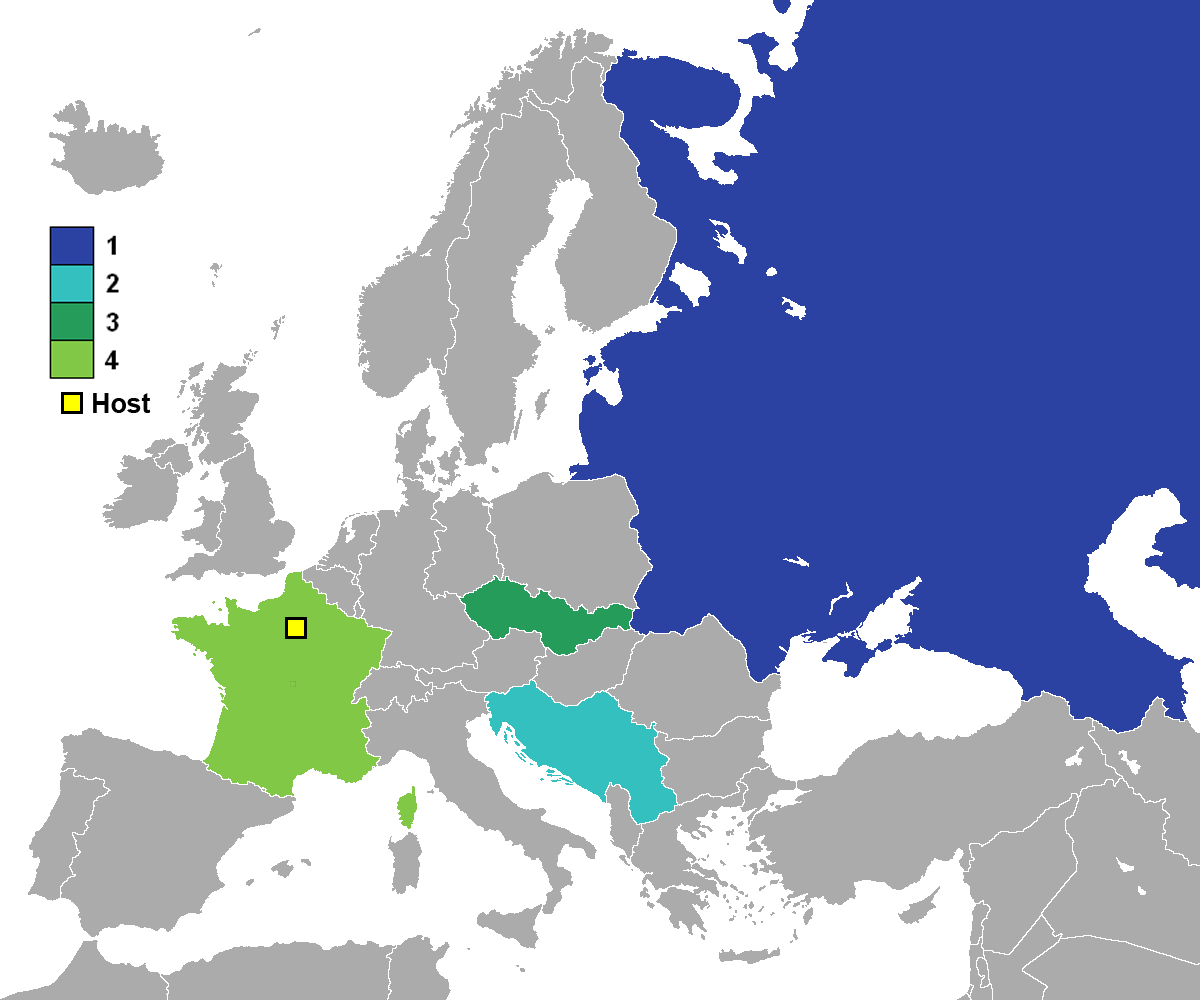
1960 European Nations' Cup finalists

In all matches but the final, extra time and a coin toss were used to decide the winner if necessary. If the final remained level after extra time, a replay would be used to determine the winner.

All times are local, CET (UTC+1).

=== Bracket ===
Semi-finals
6 July – Marseille
Czechoslovakia	0
Soviet Union	3
6 July – Paris
France	4
Yugoslavia	5

Final
10 July – Paris
Soviet Union (a.e.t.)	2
Yugoslavia	1
Third place play-off
9 July – Marseille
Czechoslovakia	2
France	0

=== Semi-finals ===
6 July 1960
20:00

France	4–5	Yugoslavia
Vincent 12'; Heutte 43', 62'; Wisniewski 53'	Report	Galić 11'; Žanetić 55'; Knez 75'; Jerković 78', 79'

Parc des Princes, Paris
Attendance: 26,370
Referee: Gaston Grandain (Belgium)

6 July 1960
21:30

Czechoslovakia	0–3	Soviet Union
	Report	Ivanov 34', 56'; Ponedelnik 66'

Stade Vélodrome, Marseille
Attendance: 25,184
Referee: Cesare Jonni (Italy)

=== Third place play-off ===
9 July 1960
21:30

Czechoslovakia	2–0	France
Bubník 58'; Pavlovič 88'	Report

Stade Vélodrome, Marseille
Attendance: 9,438
Referee: Cesare Jonni (Italy)

=== Final ===
10 July 1960
20:30

Soviet Union	2–1 (a.e.t.)	Yugoslavia
Metreveli 49'; Ponedelnik 113'	Report	Galić 43'

Parc des Princes, Paris
Attendance: 17,966
Referee: Arthur Ellis (England)

== Statistics ==
=== Goalscorers ===
There were 17 goals scored in 4 matches, for an average of 4.25 goals per match.

2 goals

- (France) François Heutte
- (Soviet Union) Valentin Ivanov
- (Soviet Union) Viktor Ponedelnik
- (Socialist Federal Republic of Yugoslavia) Milan Galić
- (Socialist Federal Republic of Yugoslavia) Dražan Jerković

1 goal

- (Czechoslovakia) Vlastimil Bubník
- (Czechoslovakia) Ladislav Pavlovič
- (France) Jean Vincent
- (France) Maryan Wisniewski
- (Soviet Union) Slava Metreveli
- (Socialist Federal Republic of Yugoslavia) Tomislav Knez
- (Socialist Federal Republic of Yugoslavia) Ante Žanetić

=== Awards ===
UEFA Team of the Tournament

Goalkeeper	Defenders	Midfielders	Forwards
(Soviet Union) Lev Yashin	(Czechoslovakia) Ladislav Novák (Socialist Federal Republic of Yugoslavia) Vladimir Durković	(Czechoslovakia) Josef Masopust (Soviet Union) Valentin Ivanov (Soviet Union) Igor Netto	(Soviet Union) Slava Metreveli (Soviet Union) Viktor Ponedelnik (Socialist Federal Republic of Yugoslavia) Milan Galić (Socialist Federal Republic of Yugoslavia) Bora Kostić (Socialist Federal Republic of Yugoslavia) Dragoslav Šekularac
