= UEFA Euro 1968 squads =

EFC squads for the 1968 championship in Italy

These are the squads for the UEFA Euro 1968 tournament in Italy, that took place between 5 June and 10 June 1968. The players' listed ages is their age on the tournament's opening day (5 June 1968).

Every player in the tournament played for a club in his native country.

== England ==
Manager: Alf Ramsey

No.	Pos.	Player	Date of birth (age)	Caps	Club
1	GK	Gordon Banks	30 December 1937 (aged 30)	43	(England) Stoke City
2	DF	Keith Newton	23 June 1941 (aged 26)	9	(England) Blackburn Rovers
3	DF	Ray Wilson	17 December 1934 (aged 33)	61	(England) Everton
4	MF	Alan Mullery	23 November 1941 (aged 26)	10	(England) Tottenham Hotspur
5	DF	Brian Labone	23 January 1940 (aged 28)	9	(England) Everton
6	DF	Bobby Moore (captain)	12 April 1941 (aged 27)	61	(England) West Ham United
7	MF	Alan Ball	12 May 1945 (aged 23)	26	(England) Everton
8	FW	Roger Hunt	20 July 1938 (aged 29)	30	(England) Liverpool
9	MF	Bobby Charlton	11 October 1937 (aged 30)	85	(England) Manchester United
10	FW	Geoff Hurst	8 December 1941 (aged 26)	20	(England) West Ham United
11	MF	Martin Peters	8 November 1943 (aged 24)	19	(England) West Ham United
12	GK	Alex Stepney	18 September 1942 (aged 25)	1	(England) Manchester United
13	GK	Gordon West	24 April 1943 (aged 25)	0	(England) Everton
14	DF	Cyril Knowles	13 July 1944 (aged 23)	4	(England) Tottenham Hotspur
15	DF	Jack Charlton	8 May 1935 (aged 33)	28	(England) Leeds United
16	DF	Tommy Wright	21 October 1944 (aged 23)	0	(England) Everton
17	MF	Nobby Stiles	18 May 1942 (aged 26)	24	(England) Manchester United
18	FW	Mike Summerbee	15 December 1942 (aged 25)	3	(England) Manchester City
19	DF	Norman Hunter	29 October 1943 (aged 24)	8	(England) Leeds United
20	MF	Colin Bell	26 February 1946 (aged 22)	2	(England) Manchester City
21	FW	Jimmy Greaves	20 February 1940 (aged 28)	57	(England) Tottenham Hotspur
22	MF	Peter Thompson	27 November 1942 (aged 25)	14	(England) Liverpool

== Italy ==
Manager: Ferruccio Valcareggi

No.	Pos.	Player	Date of birth (age)	Caps	Club
1	GK	Enrico Albertosi	2 November 1939 (aged 28)	18	(Italy) Fiorentina
2	FW	Pietro Anastasi	7 April 1948 (aged 20)	0	(Italy) Varese
3	DF	Angelo Anquilletti	25 April 1943 (aged 25)	0	(Italy) Milan
4	DF	Giancarlo Bercellino	9 October 1941 (aged 26)	5	(Italy) Juventus
5	DF	Tarcisio Burgnich	25 April 1939 (aged 29)	21	(Italy) Internazionale
6	FW	Giacomo Bulgarelli	24 October 1940 (aged 27)	29	(Italy) Bologna
7	DF	Ernesto Castano	2 May 1939 (aged 29)	2	(Italy) Juventus
8	MF	Giancarlo De Sisti	13 March 1943 (aged 25)	2	(Italy) Fiorentina
9	FW	Angelo Domenghini	25 August 1941 (aged 26)	12	(Italy) Internazionale
10	DF	Giacinto Facchetti (captain)	18 July 1942 (aged 25)	34	(Italy) Internazionale
11	MF	Giorgio Ferrini	18 August 1939 (aged 28)	5	(Italy) Torino
12	MF	Aristide Guarneri	7 March 1938 (aged 30)	19	(Italy) Bologna
13	MF	Antonio Juliano	26 December 1942 (aged 25)	10	(Italy) Napoli
14	MF	Giovanni Lodetti	10 August 1942 (aged 25)	16	(Italy) Milan
15	FW	Sandro Mazzola	8 November 1942 (aged 25)	29	(Italy) Internazionale
16	FW	Pierino Prati	13 December 1946 (aged 21)	2	(Italy) Milan
17	FW	Gigi Riva	7 November 1944 (aged 23)	6	(Italy) Cagliari
18	MF	Gianni Rivera	18 August 1943 (aged 24)	31	(Italy) Milan
19	DF	Roberto Rosato	18 August 1943 (aged 24)	15	(Italy) Milan
20	DF	Sandro Salvadore	29 November 1939 (aged 28)	29	(Italy) Juventus
21	GK	Lido Vieri	16 July 1939 (aged 28)	4	(Italy) Torino
22	GK	Dino Zoff	28 February 1942 (aged 26)	1	(Italy) Napoli

As in 1966 World Cup, the players were sorted alphabetically.

== Soviet Union ==
Manager: Mikhail Yakushin

No.	Pos.	Player	Date of birth (age)	Caps	Club
1	GK	Yuri Pshenichnikov	2 June 1940 (aged 28)	15	(Soviet Union) CSKA Moscow
2	MF	Viktor Anichkin	8 December 1941 (aged 26)	20	(Soviet Union) Dynamo Moscow
3	DF	Valentin Afonin	22 December 1939 (aged 28)	32	(Soviet Union) CSKA Moscow
4	FW	Anatoliy Banishevskiy	23 February 1946 (aged 22)	38	(Soviet Union) Neftchi Baku
5	FW	Anatoliy Byshovets	23 April 1946 (aged 22)	16	(Soviet Union) Dynamo Kyiv
6	MF	Valery Voronin	17 July 1939 (aged 28)	66	(Soviet Union) Torpedo Moscow
7	FW	Gennady Yevriuzhikin	4 July 1944 (aged 23)	7	(Soviet Union) Dynamo Moscow
8	DF	Yuriy Istomin	3 July 1944 (aged 23)	9	(Soviet Union) CSKA Moscow
9	GK	Anzor Kavazashvili	19 July 1940 (aged 27)	20	(Soviet Union) Torpedo Moscow
10	DF	Vladimir Kaplichny	26 May 1944 (aged 24)	7	(Soviet Union) CSKA Moscow
11	FW	Eduard Malofeyev	2 June 1942 (aged 26)	38	(Soviet Union) Dynamo Minsk
12	MF	Vladimir Muntyan	14 September 1946 (aged 21)	0	(Soviet Union) Dynamo Kyiv
13	FW	Givi Nodia	2 January 1948 (aged 20)	2	(Soviet Union) Dinamo Tbilisi
14	GK	Evgeni Rudakov	2 January 1942 (aged 26)	1	(Soviet Union) Dynamo Kyiv
15	DF	Vladimir Levchenko	18 February 1944 (aged 24)	2	(Soviet Union) Dynamo Kyiv
16	MF	Murtaz Khurtsilava	5 January 1943 (aged 25)	30	(Soviet Union) Dinamo Tbilisi
17	MF	Igor Chislenko	4 January 1939 (aged 29)	53	(Soviet Union) Dynamo Moscow
18	DF	Albert Shesternyov (captain)	20 June 1941 (aged 26)	59	(Soviet Union) CSKA Moscow
19	MF	Aleksandr Lenev	25 September 1944 (aged 23)	6	(Soviet Union) Torpedo Moscow
20	MF	Kakhi Asatiani	1 January 1947 (aged 21)	2	(Soviet Union) Dinamo Tbilisi
21	DF	Gennady Logofet	15 February 1942 (aged 26)	9	(Soviet Union) Spartak Moscow
22	FW	Nikolai Smolnikov	10 March 1949 (aged 19)	3	(Soviet Union) Neftchi Baku

== Yugoslavia ==
Manager: Rajko Mitić

No.	Pos.	Player	Date of birth (age)	Caps	Club
1	GK	Ilija Pantelić	2 August 1942 (aged 25)	15	(Socialist Federal Republic of Yugoslavia) Vojvodina Novi Sad
2	DF	Mirsad Fazlagić (captain)	4 April 1943 (aged 25)	16	(Socialist Federal Republic of Yugoslavia) FK Sarajevo
3	DF	Milan Damjanović	15 October 1943 (aged 24)	3	(Socialist Federal Republic of Yugoslavia) Partizan Belgrade
4	MF	Borivoje Đorđević	2 August 1948 (aged 19)	3	(Socialist Federal Republic of Yugoslavia) Partizan Belgrade
5	DF	Blagoje Paunović	4 June 1947 (aged 21)	3	(Socialist Federal Republic of Yugoslavia) Partizan Belgrade
6	DF	Dragan Holcer	19 January 1945 (aged 23)	13	(Socialist Federal Republic of Yugoslavia) Hajduk Split
7	MF	Ilija Petković	22 September 1945 (aged 22)	1	(Socialist Federal Republic of Yugoslavia) OFK Belgrade
8	MF	Ivica Osim	6 May 1941 (aged 27)	12	(Socialist Federal Republic of Yugoslavia) FK Željezničar
9	FW	Vahidin Musemić	29 October 1946 (aged 21)	3	(Socialist Federal Republic of Yugoslavia) FK Sarajevo
10	MF	Rudolf Belin	4 November 1942 (aged 25)	20	(Socialist Federal Republic of Yugoslavia) Dinamo Zagreb
11	FW	Dragan Džajić	30 May 1946 (aged 22)	25	(Socialist Federal Republic of Yugoslavia) Red Star Belgrade
12	GK	Radomir Vukčević	15 September 1944 (aged 23)	2	(Socialist Federal Republic of Yugoslavia) Hajduk Split
13	GK	Ratomir Dujković	24 February 1946 (aged 22)	0	(Socialist Federal Republic of Yugoslavia) Red Star Belgrade
14	DF	Rajko Aleksić	19 February 1947 (aged 21)	0	(Socialist Federal Republic of Yugoslavia) Vojvodina Novi Sad
15	MF	Miroslav Pavlović	23 October 1942 (aged 25)	0	(Socialist Federal Republic of Yugoslavia) Red Star Belgrade
16	MF	Jovan Aćimović	21 June 1948 (aged 19)	0	(Socialist Federal Republic of Yugoslavia) Red Star Belgrade
17	DF	Mladen Ramljak	1 July 1945 (aged 22)	5	(Socialist Federal Republic of Yugoslavia) Dinamo Zagreb
18	DF	Ljubomir Mihajlović	4 September 1943 (aged 24)	6	(Socialist Federal Republic of Yugoslavia) Partizan Belgrade
19	MF	Ivica Brzić	28 May 1941 (aged 27)	0	(Socialist Federal Republic of Yugoslavia) Vojvodina Novi Sad
20	FW	Boško Antić	7 January 1944 (aged 24)	0	(Socialist Federal Republic of Yugoslavia) FK Sarajevo
21	MF	Dobrivoje Trivić	26 October 1943 (aged 24)	5	(Socialist Federal Republic of Yugoslavia) Vojvodina Novi Sad
22	FW	Idriz Hošić	17 February 1944 (aged 24)	1	(Socialist Federal Republic of Yugoslavia) Partizan Belgrade
