= UEFA Euro 1968 final tournament =

1968 single elimination UEFA final tournament

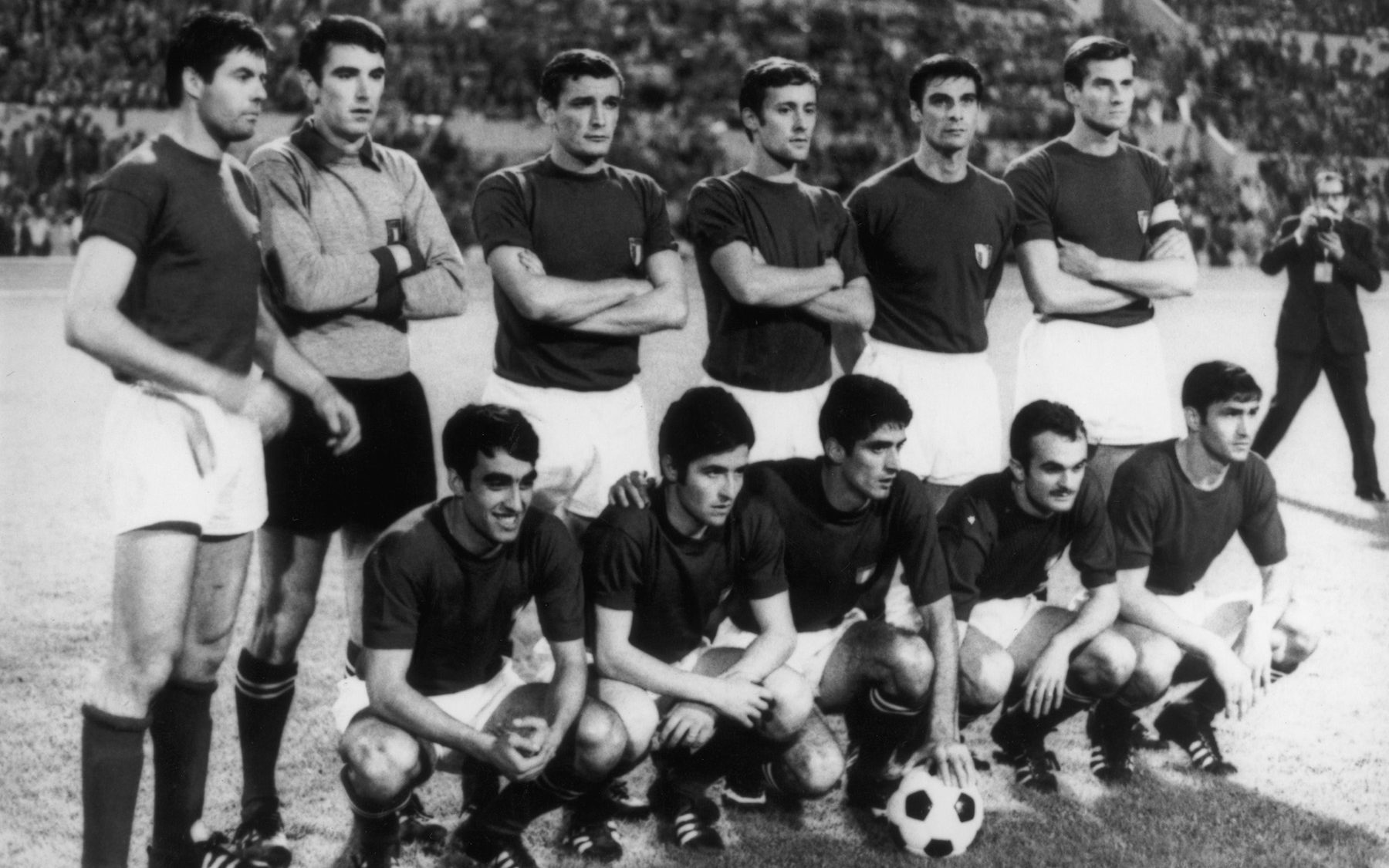
The Italian line-up on the pitch prior to the start of the final replay

The final tournament of UEFA Euro 1968 was a single-elimination tournament involving the four teams that qualified from the quarter-finals. There were two rounds of matches: a semi-final stage leading to the final to decide the champions. The final tournament began with the semi-finals on 5 June and ended with the final replay on 10 June at the Stadio Olimpico in Rome. Italy won the tournament with a 2–0 replay victory over Yugoslavia.

All times Central European Summer Time (UTC+2).

== Format ==
Any game in the final tournament that was undecided by the end of the regular 90 minutes was followed by thirty minutes of extra time (two 15-minute halves). If scores were still level, a coin toss would be used in all matches but the final. If the final finished level after extra time, a replay would take place at a later date to decide the winner.

== Teams ==
Team	Method of qualification	Date of qualification	Finals appearance	Last appearance	Previous best performance
England	Quarter-final winner	8 May 1968	1st	—	Debut
Italy (host)	Quarter-final winner	20 April 1968	1st	—	Debut
Soviet Union	Quarter-final winner	11 May 1968	3rd	1964	Winners (1960)
Yugoslavia	Quarter-final winner	24 April 1968	2nd	1960	Runners-up (1960)

== Bracket ==
Semi-finals
5 June – Naples
Italy (coin toss)	0
Soviet Union	0
5 June – Florence
Yugoslavia	1
England	0

Final
8 and 10 June – Rome
Italy (replay)	1	2
Yugoslavia	1	0
Third place play-off
8 June – Rome
England	2
Soviet Union	0

== Semi-finals ==
=== Italy vs Soviet Union ===
The match was decided by a coin toss. Italy captain Giacinto Facchetti called correctly.

5 June 1968
18:00

Italy	0–0 (a.e.t.) Italy won on coin toss	Soviet Union
	Report

Stadio San Paolo, Naples
Attendance: 68,582
Referee: Kurt Tschenscher (West Germany)

Italy	Soviet Union

GK	22	Dino Zoff
SW	7	Ernesto Castano
RB	5	Tarcisio Burgnich
CB	4	Giancarlo Bercellino
LB	10	Giacinto Facchetti (c)
DM	11	Giorgio Ferrini
CM	13	Antonio Juliano
CM	18	Gianni Rivera
RW	9	Angelo Domenghini
FW	15	Sandro Mazzola
FW	16	Pierino Prati
Manager:
Ferruccio Valcareggi

GK	1	Yuri Pshenichnikov
SW	18	Albert Shesternyov (c)
RB	8	Yuriy Istomin
CB	10	Volodymyr Kaplychnyi
LB	3	Valentin Afonin
RH	11	Eduard Malofeyev
CM	21	Gennady Logofet
CM	19	Aleksandr Lenyov
RW	5	Anatoliy Byshovets
CF	4	Anatoliy Banishevskiy
LW	7	Gennady Yevryuzhikhin
Manager:
Mikhail Yakushin

=== Yugoslavia vs England ===
5 June 1968
21:15

Yugoslavia	1–0	England
Džajić 86'	Report

Stadio Comunale, Florence
Attendance: 21,834
Referee: José María Ortiz de Mendíbil (Spain)

Yugoslavia	England

GK	1	Ilija Pantelić
SW	6	Dragan Holcer
RB	2	Mirsad Fazlagić (c)
CB	5	Blagoje Paunović
LB	3	Milan Damjanović
DM	15	Miroslav Pavlović
CM	21	Dobrivoje Trivić
CM	8	Ivica Osim
RW	7	Ilija Petković
LW	11	Dragan Džajić
CF	9	Vahidin Musemić
Manager:
Rajko Mitić

GK	1	Gordon Banks
RB	2	Keith Newton
CB	5	Brian Labone
CB	6	Bobby Moore (c)
LB	3	Ray Wilson
DM	19	Norman Hunter
CM	4	Alan Mullery	(red card) 89'
CM	9	Bobby Charlton
CM	11	Martin Peters
CF	7	Alan Ball
CF	8	Roger Hunt
Manager:
Alf Ramsey

== Third place play-off ==
8 June 1968
18:45

England	2–0	Soviet Union
B. Charlton 39'; Hurst 63'	Report

Stadio Olimpico, Rome
Attendance: 68,817
Referee: István Zsolt (Hungary)

England	Soviet Union

GK	1	Gordon Banks
RB	16	Tommy Wright
CB	5	Brian Labone
CB	6	Bobby Moore (c)
LB	3	Ray Wilson
DM	19	Norman Hunter
CM	17	Nobby Stiles
CM	9	Bobby Charlton
CM	11	Martin Peters
CF	8	Roger Hunt
CF	10	Geoff Hurst
Manager:
Alf Ramsey

GK	1	Yuri Pshenichnikov
SW	18	Albert Shesternyov (c)
RB	8	Yuriy Istomin
CB	10	Volodymyr Kaplychnyi
LB	3	Valentin Afonin
RH	11	Eduard Malofeyev
CM	19	Aleksandr Lenyov
CM	21	Gennady Logofet
RW	5	Anatoliy Byshovets
CF	4	Anatoliy Banishevskiy
LW	7	Gennady Yevryuzhikhin
Manager:
Mikhail Yakushin

== Final ==
=== Original match ===
As the match ended in a draw, a replay was played to determine the winner.

8 June 1968
21:15

Italy	1–1 (a.e.t.)	Yugoslavia
Domenghini 80'	Report	Džajić 39'

Stadio Olimpico, Rome
Attendance: 68,817
Referee: Gottfried Dienst (Switzerland)

Italy	Yugoslavia

GK	22	Dino Zoff
SW	7	Ernesto Castano
CB	5	Tarcisio Burgnich
CB	12	Aristide Guarneri
LB	10	Giacinto Facchetti (c)
RM	9	Angelo Domenghini
CM	14	Giovanni Lodetti
CM	11	Giorgio Ferrini
AM	13	Antonio Juliano
CF	2	Pietro Anastasi
CF	16	Pierino Prati
Manager:
Ferruccio Valcareggi

GK	1	Ilija Pantelić
RB	2	Mirsad Fazlagić (c)
CB	5	Blagoje Paunović
CB	6	Dragan Holcer
LB	3	Milan Damjanović
RM	21	Dobrivoje Trivić
CM	15	Miroslav Pavlović
LM	10	Jovan Aćimović
RW	7	Ilija Petković
LW	11	Dragan Džajić
CF	9	Vahidin Musemić
Manager:
Rajko Mitić

=== Replay ===
10 June 1968
21:15

Italy	2–0	Yugoslavia
Riva 12'; Anastasi 31'	Report

Stadio Olimpico, Rome
Attendance: 32,886
Referee: José María Ortiz de Mendíbil (Spain)

Italy	Yugoslavia

GK	22	Dino Zoff
SW	20	Sandro Salvadore
CB	12	Aristide Guarneri
CB	19	Roberto Rosato
RB	5	Tarcisio Burgnich
LB	10	Giacinto Facchetti (c)
IR	15	Sandro Mazzola
IL	8	Giancarlo De Sisti
LW	9	Angelo Domenghini
CF	2	Pietro Anastasi
LF	17	Gigi Riva
Manager:
Ferruccio Valcareggi

GK	1	Ilija Pantelić
RB	2	Mirsad Fazlagić (c)
CB	5	Blagoje Paunović
CB	6	Dragan Holcer
LB	3	Milan Damjanović
CM	21	Dobrivoje Trivić
CM	15	Miroslav Pavlović
CM	10	Jovan Aćimović
RF	22	Idriz Hošić
CF	9	Vahidin Musemić
LF	11	Dragan Džajić
Manager:
Rajko Mitić

== See also ==
- England at the UEFA European Championship
- Italy at the UEFA European Championship
- Soviet Union at the UEFA European Championship
- Yugoslavia at the UEFA European Championship
