= UEFA Euro 1968 final =

European football tournament final match

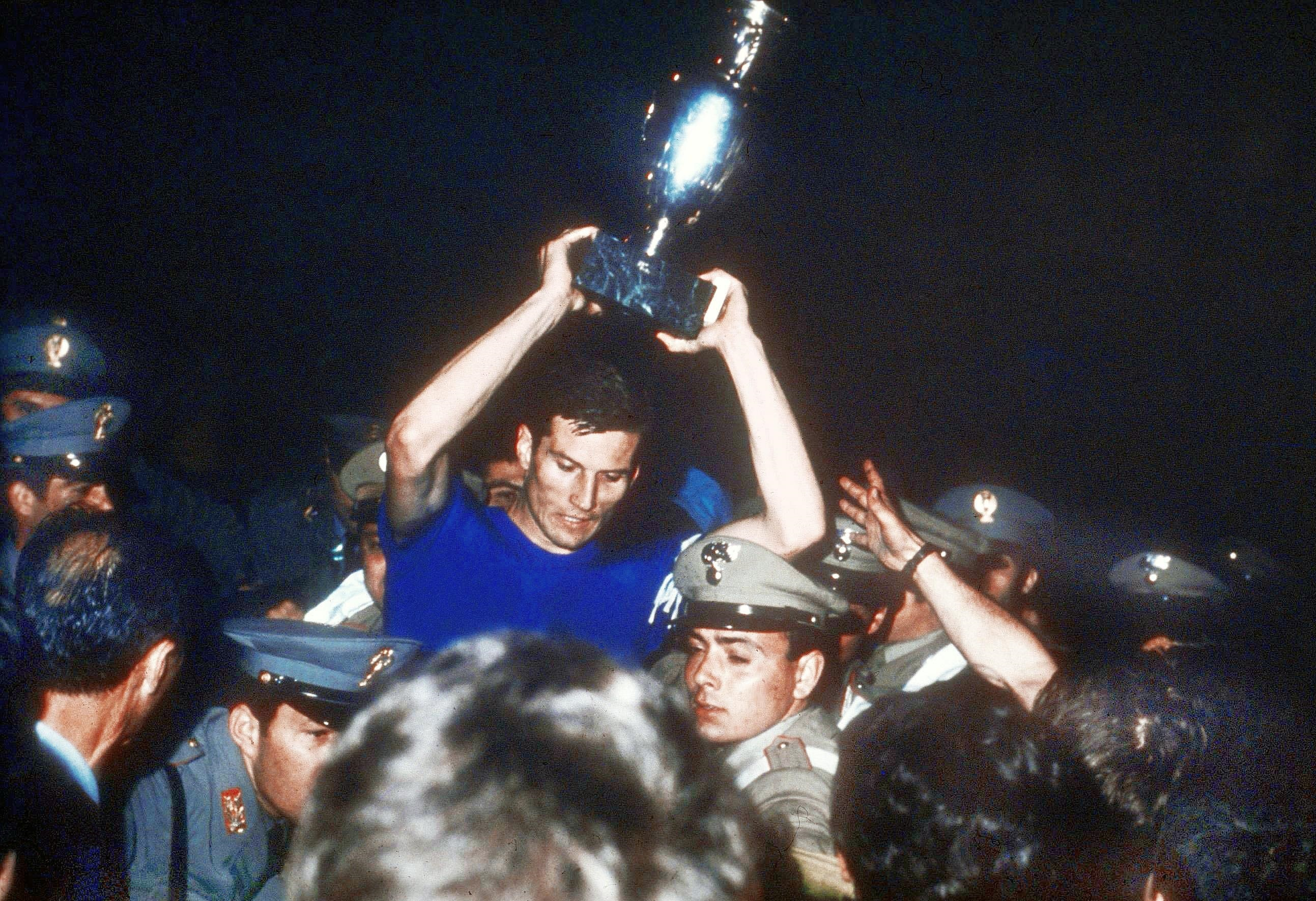
- Italian captain Giacinto Facchetti with the trophy
- Event: UEFA Euro 1968
Italy	Yugoslavia
- Italy won after a replay

Final
Italy	Yugoslavia
1	1
- After extra time
- Date: 8 June 1968
- Venue: Stadio Olimpico, Rome
- Referee: Gottfried Dienst (Switzerland)
- Attendance: 68,817

Replay
Italy	Yugoslavia
2	0
- Date: 10 June 1968
- Venue: Stadio Olimpico, Rome
- Referee: José María Ortiz de Mendíbil (Spain)
- Attendance: 32,886

The UEFA Euro 1968 final consisted of two football matches played at the Stadio Olimpico in Rome, Italy, on 8 and 10 June 1968, to determine the winners of the UEFA Euro 1968 tournament. It was the third European Championship final, UEFA's top football competition for national teams. The match was contested by Italy and Yugoslavia.

En route to the final, Italy finished top of their qualifying group, which included Romania, Cyprus and Switzerland. After beating Bulgaria over a two-legged tie in the quarter-finals, they progressed to the final, winning a coin toss which decided the outcome of their semi-final against the Soviet Union, which had ended goalless after extra time. Yugoslavia also won their qualifying group, which included Albania and West Germany, before beating France 6–2 on aggregate in the two-legged quarter-finals, and then England 1–0 in the single-match semi-final.

The initial final was played at the Stadio Olimpico in Rome on 8 June 1968 in front of a crowd of 68,817, and was refereed by Gottfried Dienst from Switzerland. After the match finished 1–1 during regulation, extra time brought no change to the scoreline and ended in a draw, thus requiring the result of the final to be determined by a replay. The replay was played two days later, again at the Stadio Olimpico, in front of a crowd of 32,866, with José María Ortiz de Mendíbil from Spain as the referee. Italy would this time win the match 2–0, securing their first European Championship title.

== Background ==
UEFA Euro 1968 was the third edition of the UEFA European Championship, UEFA's football competition for national teams. Qualifying rounds were played on a home-and-away round-robin tournament basis prior to the semi-finals and final taking place in Italy, between 5 and 10 June 1968. A third-place play-off match took place before the final, on the same day.

Italy had been knocked out in the 1964 European Nations' Cup in the round of 16, losing to the eventual tournament runners-up the Soviet Union. Similarly, Yugoslavia, who lost in the 1960 final, had been eliminated in the round of 16 in the 1964 tournament by Sweden. In the 1966 FIFA World Cup, Italy had failed to progress beyond the group stage, losing to both the Soviet Union and North Korea. Yugoslavia did not participate in the 1966 FIFA World Cup finals having failed to qualify from their group. The UEFA Euro 1968 Final was the third competitive match between Yugoslavia and Italy, with the sides having twice played each other in the Central European International Cup in 1955 and 1957.

== Road to the final ==
=== Italy ===
Italy's route to the final
Round	Opposition	Score
Qualifying group	Romania	3–1 (H), 1–0 (A)
Qualifying group	Cyprus	2–0 (A), 5–0 (H)
Qualifying group	Switzerland	2–2 (A), 4–0 (H)
Quarter-final	Bulgaria	2–3 (A), 2–0 (H)
Semi-final	Soviet Union	0–0 (a.e.t.) (N) (Note: Italy progressed to the final when the match ended 0–0 and they won the subsequent coin toss.)

Italy commenced their UEFA Euro 1968 campaign in Qualifying Group 6 where they faced three other teams in a home-and-away round robin tournament. Their first fixture was against Romania at the Stadio San Paolo in Naples on 26 November 1966, where two goals from Sandro Mazzola and one from Virginio De Paoli secured a 3–1 victory. Their next opponents were Cyprus who they faced at the GSP Stadium in Nicosia on 22 March 1967. Angelo Domenghini scored midway through the second half before Giacinto Facchetti doubled Italy's lead for a 2–0 win. Italy's return match against Romania was played on 25 June 1967 at the Stadionul 23. August in Bucharest. Mario Bertini scored with nine minutes of the game remaining to give Italy a 1–0 victory. Next, Italy faced Cyprus at the Stadio San Vito-Gigi Marulla in Cosenza where they won 5–0 with two goals from Mazzola and a hat-trick from Gigi Riva. Italy's final opponents in the group were Switzerland, the first match against whom was played at the Wankdorf Stadium in Bern on 18 November 1967. René-Pierre Quentin gave the home side the lead eleven minutes before half-time but Riva equalised midway through the second half. Fritz Künzli restored Switzerland's lead two minutes later but a penalty from Riva five minutes before the end of the match resulted in a 2–2 draw. The return fixture was held on 23 December 1967 at the Stadio Amsicora in Cagliari where goals from Mazzola, Riva and Domenghini gave Italy a 3–0 half-time lead. Domenghini scored his second midway through the second half to secure a 4–0 win and assured Italy's qualification for the quarter-finals with them finishing at the top of the qualifying group.

There they faced Bulgaria in a two-legged tie, the first match of which was held at the Vasil Levski National Stadium in Sofia on 6 April 1968. After eleven minutes, Nikola Kotkov was tripped and struck the subsequent penalty past Enrico Albertosi in the Italy goal to give Bulgaria the lead. Italy's Armando Picchi was injured after a collision with Dimitar Yakimov but made to continue by Ferruccio Valcareggi, his manager. Fifteen minutes into the second half, Stancho Bonchev saved from Rivera but Dimitar Penev scored an own goal from the rebound to level the score. Dinko Dermendzhiev then scored from a corner during which Albertosi was injured and had to be replaced by Lido Vieri. Petar Zhekov then gave Bulgaria a two-goal lead when he chipped the ball over Vieri in the 73rd minute before Pierino Prati scored on his debut for Italy and the match ended 3–2. The second leg was played on 20 April 1968 at the Stadio San Paolo in Naples in front of 95,000 spectators. Prati put Italy ahead in the 14th minute with a diving header before Domenghini scored with a free kick that deflected in off the post. The match ended 2–0 and Italy progressed to the finals that they themselves would host with a 4–3 aggregate victory.

Italy's semi-final opponents were the Soviet Union, the 1960 European Nations' Cup champions, with the match taking place at the Stadio San Paolo in Naples on 5 June 1968 in heavy rain. The Soviet Union were denied a penalty after the ball struck Antonio Juliano's hand, before Prati's shot was close. Albert Shesternyov's strike was then saved by Italy's goalkeeper Dino Zoff. Early in the second half, Anatoliy Banishevskiy struck Anatoliy Byshovets' low cross wide of the Italy goal. Mazzola was then brought down by Volodymyr Kaplychnyi but no penalty was awarded before Zoff made a late save from Aleksandr Lenyov, and regular time ended 0–0, sending the match into extra time. The Soviet Union goalkeeper Yuri Pshenichnikov saved from Facchetti and Prati, while Domenghini's strike hit the inside of the Soviet Union goalpost. The referee blew the final whistle and the result was determined via a coin toss in the dressing room: Facchetti called tails and won, and returned to the pitch to celebrate Italy's progression to the final with his supporters.

=== Yugoslavia ===
Yugoslavia's route to the final
Round	Opposition	Score
Qualifying group	West Germany	1–0 (H), 1–3 (A)
Qualifying group	Albania	2–0 (A), 4–0 (H)
Quarter-final	France	1–1 (A), 5–1 (H)
Semi-final	England	1–0 (N)

Yugoslavia were in the three-team UEFA Euro 1968 qualifying Group 4 and played their first match against West Germany on 3 May 1967 at the Crvrna Zvezda in Belgrade. After a goalless first half, Josip Skoblar scored to give Yugoslavia a 1–0 win. Eleven days later they faced Albania at the Qemal Stafa Stadium in Tirana. One goal in each half from Yugoslavia's Slaven Zambata secured a 2–0 victory. They then travelled to the Volksparkstadion in Hamburg where they faced West Germany on 7 October 1967. Hannes Löhr gave West Germany an early lead before Zambata equalised just after half-time. Second-half goals from Gerd Müller and Uwe Seeler resulted in a 3–1 defeat for Yugoslavia. The final group match saw Yugoslavia face Albania at Stadion JNA in Belgrade on 12 November 1967. Edin Sprečo scored late in the first half for Yugoslavia before Ivica Osim added two goals and Vojin Lazarević one to give their side a 4–0. They finished as winners of Group 4 and progressed to the quarter-finals.

Yugoslavia's opponents in the last eight were France with the first match of the two-legged tie being held on 6 April 1968 at the Stade Vélodrome in Marseille. Yugoslavia were without several players who had moved abroad to play domestic football, rendering them ineligible for the national side. France's Fleury Di Nallo came closest to scoring in the first half but his shot struck the Yugoslavia crossbar. Midway through the second half, Dragan Džajić was fouled by Jean Baeza and took the subsequent free kick himself which Vahidin Musemić headed in to give Yugoslavia the lead. Di Nallo then ran through the Yugoslavia defence with the ball and lifted it over Ilija Pantelić in the Yugoslavia goal, and the match ended 1–1. The return leg took place 18 days later at the Crvena Zvezda Stadium in Belgrade. Three minutes into the game, Džajić's cross when met by Ilija Petković with a diving header to make it 1–0 to Yugoslavia. Musemić then doubled the lead with a deflected shot in the 13th minute before Džajić made it 3–0 a minute later. Petković dribbled past two France players before scoring and although Di Nallo scored for France, Musemić made it 5–1 from a Džajić cross, and Yugoslavia progressed to the semi-final with a 6–2 aggregate victory.

The semi-final saw Yugoslavia drawn against the 1966 FIFA World Cup champions England with the one-off match being played on 5 June 1968 at the Stadio Comunale in Florence. The game was marred by ill-discipline with the referee awarding 49 fouls over its course. Norman Hunter injured Osim early in the first half before Džajić was fouled from behind by Alan Mullery. Alan Ball Jr. struck the first attempt to score of the game over the Yugoslavia crossbar after half an hour, while Bobby Charlton's volley also went high just before half time. The second half continued in a similar way with few chances to score being created but numerous fouls being made. With two minutes remaining, Yugoslavia took the lead when Džajić lifted the ball over Gordon Banks. Mullery then kicked Dobrivoje Trivić and was sent off becoming the first player to be expelled in a European Championship finals game and the first England international ever to be dismissed. Yugoslavia won the match 1–0 and progressed to their second European Championship tournament final.

== Match ==
=== Pre-match ===
The referee for the match was Gottfried Dienst from Switzerland. He had also officiated over the 1966 FIFA World Cup Final. Italy were without the injured Rivera and Mazzola was rested. The Yugoslavia team had an average age of 23.

=== Summary ===
The final was played at the Stadio Olimpico in Rome on 8 June 1968 in front of a crowd of 68,817. Giorgio Ferrini's long-range shot was fumbled by Pantelić but cleared by his defence before Ferrini dropped a cross and was forced to make a close-range save from Facchetti. Prati then made a run down the left side of the pitch before striking a shot off-target. Domenghini struck the ball with his thigh and went wide of the Yugoslavia goal. Six minutes before half-time, Džajić gave his side the lead. Trivić made a run down the right wing and crossed for Džajić whose control was initially poor but was still able to get a shot away into the Italy net. Five minutes after half-time, Džajić struck a shot but it was saved by Zoff at the near post. Juliano then headed Giovanni Lodetti's corner down but the ball was stuck under Pietro Anastasi's feet before being cleared by Mirsad Fazlagić. Zoff pushed out a low cross from Džajić and the ball fell to Musemić who opted to pass instead of shoot into an empty net. With ten minutes of the match remaining, Lodetti was fouled on the edge of the Yugoslavia penalty area by Blagoje Paunović. Domenghini's subsequent right-footed free kick went through the wall and past Pantelić who did not move, and levelled the score at 1–1. Extra time brought no change to the scoreline and the match ended in a draw, the result of the final would need to be determined in a replay.

=== Details ===
8 June 1968
21:15 CEST

Italy	1–1 (a.e.t.)	Yugoslavia
Domenghini 80'	Report	Džajić 39'

Stadio Olimpico, Rome
Attendance: 68,817
Referee: Gottfried Dienst (Switzerland)

Italy	Yugoslavia

GK	22	Dino Zoff
SW	7	Ernesto Castano
CB	5	Tarcisio Burgnich
CB	12	Aristide Guarneri
LB	10	Giacinto Facchetti (c)
RM	9	Angelo Domenghini
CM	14	Giovanni Lodetti
CM	11	Giorgio Ferrini
AM	13	Antonio Juliano
CF	2	Pietro Anastasi
CF	16	Pierino Prati
Manager:
Ferruccio Valcareggi

GK	1	Ilija Pantelić
SW	6	Dragan Holcer
RB	2	Mirsad Fazlagić (c)
CB	5	Blagoje Paunović
LB	3	Milan Damjanović
DM	15	Miroslav Pavlović
CM	21	Dobrivoje Trivić
CM	10	Jovan Aćimović
RW	7	Ilija Petković
LW	11	Dragan Džajić
CF	9	Vahidin Musemić
Manager:
Rajko Mitić

== Replay ==
=== Pre-match ===
The referee for the replay was José María Ortiz de Mendíbil who had also officiated over Yugoslavia's semi-final victory over England. Osim and Ilija Petković were unavailable for Yugoslavia, while Italy replaced Ferrini with Sandro Salvadore, Roberto Rosato and Giancarlo De Sisti came in to the midfield and Mazzola was recalled. Gigi Riva was also selected having been out for an extended period with a broken leg.

=== Summary ===
The replay was played at the Stadio Olimpico in Rome on 10 June 1968 in front of a crowd of 32,866. Riva took possession of a loose ball in the 12th minute and struck a low shot with his left foot which Pantelić pushed round the Yugoslavia goalpost. From the resulting corner, Domenghini's shot struck Riva's legs and he hit the ball on the turn to open the scoring for Italy in the 13th minute. Roberto Rosato then fouled Idriz Hošić and from Džajić's subsequent free kick, Musemić headed wide. In the 31st minute, Domenghini passed to De Sisti who kicked the ball to Anastasi. He flicked the ball up and volleyed it into the corner of the Yugoslavia goal to double his side's lead. In the second half, Riva headed wide from around 6 yards (5.5 m). His close-range shot blocked after Pantelić dropped Mazzola's cross and although Anastasi scored from the rebound, he and Riva were deemed to have been offside and the goal was disallowed. Pantelić then fumbled another cross from Mazzola but Riva's shot was high over the crossbar. The match ended 2–0 and Italy claimed their first European title.

=== Details ===
10 June 1968
21:15 CEST

Italy	2–0	Yugoslavia
Riva 12'; Anastasi 31'	Report

Stadio Olimpico, Rome
Attendance: 32,886
Referee: José María Ortiz de Mendíbil (Spain)

Italy	Yugoslavia

GK	22	Dino Zoff
SW	20	Sandro Salvadore
CB	12	Aristide Guarneri
CB	19	Roberto Rosato
RB	5	Tarcisio Burgnich
LB	10	Giacinto Facchetti (c)
IR	15	Sandro Mazzola
IL	8	Giancarlo De Sisti
LW	9	Angelo Domenghini
CF	2	Pietro Anastasi
LF	17	Gigi Riva
Manager:
Ferruccio Valcareggi

GK	1	Ilija Pantelić
SW	6	Dragan Holcer
RB	2	Mirsad Fazlagić (c)
CB	5	Blagoje Paunović
LB	3	Milan Damjanović
DM	15	Miroslav Pavlović
CM	21	Dobrivoje Trivić
CM	10	Jovan Aćimović
RW	22	Idriz Hošić
LW	11	Dragan Džajić
CF	9	Vahidin Musemić
Manager:
Rajko Mitić

== Post-match ==
All but three of UEFA's team of the tournament had featured in the final, including five Italy and three Yugoslavia players. Referring to the late goal for Italy in the initial final, Zoff admitted that "to be honest, we didn't deserve to draw". He went on to suggest that his side's performance in the replay was "perfect" and that they "definitely deserved to win that game."

Italy finished the subsequent international tournament, the 1970 FIFA World Cup, as runners-up where they were defeated 4–1 by Brazil. Yugoslavia failed to progress to the tournament finals in Mexico as they ended their qualification campaign second to Belgium in Group 6.

== See also ==
- Italy at the UEFA European Championship
- Yugoslavia at the UEFA European Championship
