= Italy at the UEFA European Championship =

International football delegation

Italy have participated in eleven UEFA European Championships, and reached the final on four occasions. They became champions as hosts in 1968, the first European Championship they qualified for, and finished as runners-up in 2000 and 2012, before winning their second continental championship at Euro 2020.

== Overall record ==
Champions Runners-up Third place Fourth place

UEFA European Championship record
Year	Round	Position	Pld	W	D*	L	GF	GA
(France) 1960	Did not enter							
(Spain) 1964	Did not qualify							
(Italy) 1968	Champions	1st	3	1	2	0	3	1
(Belgium) 1972	Did not qualify							
(Socialist Federal Republic of Yugoslavia) 1976	Did not qualify							
(Italy) 1980	Fourth place	4th	4	1	3	0	2	1
(France) 1984	Did not qualify							
(West Germany) 1988	Semi-finals	3rd	4	2	1	1	4	3
(Sweden) 1992	Did not qualify							
(England) 1996	Group stage	10th	3	1	1	1	3	3
(Belgium) (Netherlands) 2000	Runners-up	2nd	6	4	1	1	9	4
(Portugal) 2004	Group stage	9th	3	1	2	0	3	2
(Austria) (Switzerland) 2008	Quarter-finals	8th	4	1	2	1	3	4
(Poland) (Ukraine) 2012	Runners-up	2nd	6	2	3	1	6	7
(France) 2016	Quarter-finals	5th	5	3	1	1	6	2
(European Union) 2020	Champions	1st	7	5	2	0	13	4
(Germany) 2024	Round of 16	14th	4	1	1	2	3	5
(United Kingdom) (Republic of Ireland) 2028	To be determined							
(Italy) (Turkey) 2032	Qualified as co-host							
Total	2 Titles	11/17	49	22	19	8	55	36

*Draws include knockout matches decided via penalty shoot-out.
**Gold background colour indicates that the tournament was won.
***Red border colour indicates that the tournament was held on home soil.

Italy's European Championship record
First match	Italy 0–0 Soviet Union (5 June 1968; Naples, Italy)
Biggest win	Turkey 0–3 Italy (11 June 2021; Rome, Italy); Italy 3–0 Switzerland (16 June 2021; Rome, Italy)
Biggest defeat	Spain 4–0 Italy (1 July 2012; Kyiv, Ukraine)
Best result	Champions at Euro 1968 and Euro 2020
Worst result	Group stage in 1996 and 2004

=== Finals ===
Year	Manager	Captain	Italy scorers
1968	Ferruccio Valcareggi	Giacinto Facchetti	Gigi Riva, Pietro Anastasi
2000	Dino Zoff	Paolo Maldini	Marco Delvecchio
2012	Cesare Prandelli	Gianluigi Buffon	–
2020	Roberto Mancini	Giorgio Chiellini	Leonardo Bonucci

=== By match ===
Italy's score listed first.

Year	Round	Opponent	Score	Venue	Italy scorers
1968	Semi-finals	Soviet Union	0–0 (a.e.t.) won on coin toss	Naples	—
1968	Final	Yugoslavia	1–1 (a.e.t.)	Rome	Domenghini
1968	Final	Yugoslavia	2–0	Rome	Riva, Anastasi
1980	Group stage	Spain	0–0	Milan	—
1980	Group stage	England	1–0	Turin	Tardelli
1980	Group stage	Belgium	0–0	Rome	—
1980	Third place play-off	Czechoslovakia	1–1 (8–9 p)	Naples	Graziani
1988	Group stage	West Germany	1–1	Düsseldorf	Mancini
1988	Group stage	Spain	1–0	Frankfurt	Vialli
1988	Group stage	Denmark	2–0	Cologne	Altobelli, De Agostini
1988	Semi-finals	Soviet Union	0–2	Stuttgart	—
1996	Group stage	Russia	2–1	Liverpool	Casiraghi (2)
1996	Group stage	Czech Republic	1–2	Liverpool	Chiesa
1996	Group stage	Germany	0–0	Manchester	—
2000	Group stage	Turkey	2–1	Arnhem	Conte, Inzaghi
2000	Group stage	Belgium	2–0	Brussels	Totti, Fiore
2000	Group stage	Sweden	2–1	Eindhoven	Di Biagio, Del Piero
2000	Quarter-finals	Romania	2–0	Brussels	Totti, Inzaghi
2000	Semi-finals	Netherlands	0–0 (a.e.t.) (3–1 p)	Amsterdam	—
2000	Final	France	1–2 (a.s.d.e.t.)	Rotterdam	Delvecchio
2004	Group stage	Denmark	0–0	Guimarães	—
2004	Group stage	Sweden	1–1	Porto	Cassano
2004	Group stage	Bulgaria	2–1	Guimarães	Perrotta, Cassano
2008	Group stage	Netherlands	0–3	Bern	—
2008	Group stage	Romania	1–1	Zürich	Panucci
2008	Group stage	France	2–0	Zürich	Pirlo, De Rossi
2008	Quarter-finals	Spain	0–0 (a.e.t.) (2–4 p)	Vienna	—
2012	Group stage	Spain	1–1	Gdańsk	Di Natale
2012	Group stage	Croatia	1–1	Poznań	Pirlo
2012	Group stage	Republic of Ireland	2–0	Poznań	Cassano, Balotelli
2012	Quarter-finals	England	0–0 (a.e.t.) (4–2 p)	Kyiv	—
2012	Semi-finals	Germany	2–1	Warsaw	Balotelli (2)
2012	Final	Spain	0–4	Kyiv	—
2016	Group stage	Belgium	2–0	Lyon	Giaccherini, Pellè
2016	Group stage	Sweden	1–0	Toulouse	Éder
2016	Group stage	Republic of Ireland	0–1	Lille	—
2016	Round of 16	Spain	2–0	Saint-Denis	Chiellini, Pellè
2016	Quarter-finals	Germany	1–1 (a.e.t.) (5–6 p)	Bordeaux	Bonucci
2020	Group stage	Turkey	3–0	Rome	Demiral (o.g.), Immobile, Insigne
2020	Group stage	Switzerland	3–0	Rome	Locatelli (2), Immobile
2020	Group stage	Wales	1–0	Rome	Pessina
2020	Round of 16	Austria	2–1 (a.e.t.)	London	Chiesa, Pessina
2020	Quarter-finals	Belgium	2–1	Munich	Barella, Insigne
2020	Semi-finals	Spain	1–1 (a.e.t.) (4–2 p)	London	Chiesa
2020	Final	England	1–1 (a.e.t.) (3–2 p)	London	Bonucci
2024	Group stage	Albania	2–1	Dortmund	Bastoni, Barella
2024	Group stage	Spain	0–1	Gelsenkirchen	—
2024	Group stage	Croatia	1–1	Leipzig	Zaccagni
2024	Round of 16	Switzerland	0–2	Berlin	—

== Head-to-head record ==
The following table shows Italy's head-to-head record in the UEFA European Championship.

Opponent	Pld	W	D	L	GF	GA
Albania	1	1	0	0	2	1
Austria	1	1	0	0	2	1
Belgium	4	3	1	0	6	1
Bulgaria	1	1	0	0	2	1
Croatia	2	0	2	0	2	2
Czech Republic	1	0	0	1	1	2
Czechoslovakia	1	0	1	0	1	1
Denmark	2	1	1	0	2	0
England	3	1	2	0	2	1
France	2	1	0	1	3	2
Germany	4	1	3	0	4	3
Netherlands	2	0	1	1	0	3
Republic of Ireland	2	1	0	1	2	1
Romania	2	1	1	0	3	1
Russia	1	1	0	0	2	1
Soviet Union	2	0	1	1	0	2
Spain	8	2	4	2	5	7
Sweden	3	2	1	0	4	2
Switzerland	2	1	0	1	3	2
Turkey	2	2	0	0	5	1
Wales	1	1	0	0	1	0
Yugoslavia	2	1	1	0	3	1
Total	49	22	19	8	55	36

== Euro 1968 ==
=== Final tournament ===
Semi-finals

5 June 1968
18:00

Italy	0–0 (a.e.t.) Italy won on coin toss	Soviet Union
	Report

Stadio San Paolo, Naples
Attendance: 68,582
Referee: Kurt Tschenscher (West Germany)

Final

First match

8 June 1968
21:15

Italy	1–1 (a.e.t.)	Yugoslavia
Domenghini 80'	Report	Džajić 39'

Stadio Olimpico, Rome
Attendance: 68,817
Referee: Gottfried Dienst (Switzerland)

Replay

10 June 1968
21:15

Italy	2–0	Yugoslavia
Riva 12'; Anastasi 31'	Report

Stadio Olimpico, Rome
Attendance: 32,886
Referee: José María Ortiz de Mendíbil (Spain)

== Euro 1980 ==
=== Group stage ===
Pos	Team	Pld	W	D	L	GF	GA	GD	Pts	Qualification
1	Belgium	3	1	2	0	3	2	+1	4	Advance to final
2	Italy (H)	3	1	2	0	1	0	+1	4	Advance to third place play-off
3	England	3	1	1	1	3	3	0	3	
4	Spain	3	0	1	2	2	4	−2	1	

Source: UEFA
Rules for classification: Group stage tiebreakers
(H) Hosts
12 June 1980
20:30

Spain	0–0	Italy
	Report

San Siro, Milan
Attendance: 46,337
Referee: Károly Palotai (Hungary)

15 June 1980
20:30

England	0–1	Italy
	Report	Tardelli 79'

Stadio Comunale, Turin
Attendance: 59,649
Referee: Nicolae Rainea (Romania)

18 June 1980
20:30

Italy	0–0	Belgium
	Report

Stadio Olimpico, Rome
Attendance: 42,318
Referee: António Garrido (Portugal)

=== Knockout stage ===
Third place play-off

21 June 1980
20:30

Czechoslovakia	1–1	Italy
Jurkemik 54'	Report	Graziani 73'
Penalties
Masný (penalty scored); Nehoda (penalty scored); Ondruš (penalty scored); Jurkemik (penalty scored); Panenka (penalty scored); Gögh (penalty scored); Gajdůšek (penalty scored); Kozák (penalty scored); Barmoš (penalty scored)	9–8	(penalty scored) Causio; (penalty scored) Altobelli; (penalty scored) G. Baresi; (penalty scored) Cabrini; (penalty scored) Benetti; (penalty scored) Graziani; (penalty scored) Scirea; (penalty scored) Tardelli; (penalty missed) Collovati

Stadio San Paolo, Naples
Attendance: 24,652
Referee: Erich Linemayr (Austria)

== Euro 1988 ==
=== Group stage ===
Pos	Team	Pld	W	D	L	GF	GA	GD	Pts	Qualification
1	West Germany (H)	3	2	1	0	5	1	+4	5	Advance to knockout stage
2	Italy	3	2	1	0	4	1	+3	5	Advance to knockout stage
3	Spain	3	1	0	2	3	5	−2	2	
4	Denmark	3	0	0	3	2	7	−5	0	

Source: UEFA
Rules for classification: Group stage tiebreakers
(H) Hosts
10 June 1988
20:15

West Germany	1–1	Italy
Brehme 55'	Report	Mancini 52'

Rheinstadion, Düsseldorf
Attendance: 62,552
Referee: Keith Hackett (England)

14 June 1988
20:15

Italy	1–0	Spain
Vialli 73'	Report

Waldstadion, Frankfurt
Attendance: 47,506
Referee: Erik Fredriksson (Sweden)

17 June 1988
20:15

Italy	2–0	Denmark
Altobelli 67'; De Agostini 87'	Report

Müngersdorfer Stadion, Cologne
Attendance: 53,951
Referee: Bruno Galler (Switzerland)

=== Knockout stage ===
Semi-finals

22 June 1988
20:15

Soviet Union	2–0	Italy
Lytovchenko 58'; Protasov 62'	Report

Neckarstadion, Stuttgart
Attendance: 61,606
Referee: Alexis Ponnet (Belgium)

== Euro 1996 ==
=== Group stage ===
Pos	Team	Pld	W	D	L	GF	GA	GD	Pts	Qualification
1	Germany	3	2	1	0	5	0	+5	7	Advance to knockout stage
2	Czech Republic	3	1	1	1	5	6	−1	4 (Note: Head-to-head result: Czech Republic 2–1 Italy.)	Advance to knockout stage
3	Italy	3	1	1	1	3	3	0	4	
4	Russia	3	0	1	2	4	8	−4	1	

Source: UEFA
Rules for classification: Group stage tiebreakers
Notes:
11 June 1996
16:30

Italy	2–1	Russia
Casiraghi 5', 52'	Report	Tsymbalar 21'

Anfield, Liverpool
Attendance: 35,120
Referee: Leslie Mottram (Scotland)

14 June 1996
19:30

Czech Republic	2–1	Italy
Nedvěd 5'; Bejbl 35'	Report	Chiesa 18'

Anfield, Liverpool
Attendance: 37,320
Referee: Antonio López Nieto (Spain)

19 June 1996
19:30

Italy	0–0	Germany
	Report

Old Trafford, Manchester
Attendance: 53,740
Referee: Guy Goethals (Belgium)

== Euro 2000 ==
=== Group stage ===
Pos	Team	Pld	W	D	L	GF	GA	GD	Pts	Qualification
1	Italy	3	3	0	0	6	2	+4	9	Advance to knockout stage
2	Turkey	3	1	1	1	3	2	+1	4	Advance to knockout stage
3	Belgium (H)	3	1	0	2	2	5	−3	3	
4	Sweden	3	0	1	2	2	4	−2	1	

Source: UEFA
Rules for classification: Group stage tiebreakers
(H) Hosts
11 June 2000
14:30

Turkey	1–2	Italy
Okan 62'	Report	Conte 52'; Inzaghi 70' (pen.)

GelreDome, Arnhem
Attendance: 22,500
Referee: Hugh Dallas (Scotland)

14 June 2000
20:45

Italy	2–0	Belgium
Totti 6'; Fiore 66'	Report

King Baudouin Stadium, Brussels
Attendance: 44,500
Referee: José María García-Aranda (Spain)

19 June 2000
20:45

Italy	2–1	Sweden
Di Biagio 39'; Del Piero 88'	Report	Larsson 77'

Philips Stadion, Eindhoven
Attendance: 30,000
Referee: Vítor Melo Pereira (Portugal)

=== Knockout stage ===
Quarter-finals

24 June 2000
20:45

Italy	2–0	Romania
Totti 33'; Inzaghi 43'	Report

King Baudouin Stadium, Brussels
Attendance: 41,000
Referee: Vítor Melo Pereira (Portugal)

Semi-finals

29 June 2000
18:00

Italy	0–0 (a.e.t.)	Netherlands
	Report
Penalties
Di Biagio (penalty scored); Pessotto (penalty scored); Totti (penalty scored); Maldini (penalty missed)	3–1	(penalty missed) F. de Boer; (penalty missed) Stam; (penalty scored) Kluivert; (penalty missed) Bosvelt

Amsterdam Arena, Amsterdam
Attendance: 50,000
Referee: Markus Merk (Germany)

Final

2 July 2000
20:00

France	2–1 (a.e.t./g.g.)	Italy
Wiltord 90+4'; Trezeguet 103'	Report	Delvecchio 55'

De Kuip, Rotterdam
Attendance: 48,100
Referee: Anders Frisk (Sweden)

== Euro 2004 ==
=== Group stage ===
Pos	Team	Pld	W	D	L	GF	GA	GD	Pts	Qualification
1	Sweden	3	1	2	0	8	3	+5	5 (Note: Tied on head-to-head points (2) and goal difference (0). Head-to-head goals for: Sweden 3, Denmark 2, Italy 1.)	Advance to knockout stage
2	Denmark	3	1	2	0	4	2	+2	5	Advance to knockout stage
3	Italy	3	1	2	0	3	2	+1	5	
4	Bulgaria	3	0	0	3	1	9	−8	0	

Source: UEFA
Rules for classification: Group stage tiebreakers
Notes:
14 June 2004
17:00

Denmark	0–0	Italy
	Report

Estádio D. Afonso Henriques, Guimarães
Attendance: 29,595
Referee: Manuel Mejuto González (Spain)

18 June 2004
19:45

Italy	1–1	Sweden
Cassano 37'	Report	Ibrahimović 85'

Estádio do Dragão, Porto
Attendance: 44,926
Referee: Urs Meier (Switzerland)

22 June 2004
19:45

Italy	2–1	Bulgaria
Perrotta 48'; Cassano 90+4'	Report	M. Petrov 45' (pen.)

Estádio D. Afonso Henriques, Guimarães
Attendance: 16,002
Referee: Valentin Ivanov (Russia)

== Euro 2008 ==
=== Group stage ===
Pos	Team	Pld	W	D	L	GF	GA	GD	Pts	Qualification
1	Netherlands	3	3	0	0	9	1	+8	9	Advance to knockout stage
2	Italy	3	1	1	1	3	4	−1	4	Advance to knockout stage
3	Romania	3	0	2	1	1	3	−2	2	
4	France	3	0	1	2	1	6	−5	1	

Source: UEFA
Rules for classification: Group stage tiebreakers
9 June 2008
20:45

Netherlands	3–0	Italy
Van Nistelrooy 26'; Sneijder 31'; Van Bronckhorst 79'	Report

Stade de Suisse, Bern
Attendance: 30,777
Referee: Peter Fröjdfeldt (Sweden)

13 June 2008
18:00

Italy	1–1	Romania
Panucci 56'	Report	Mutu 55'

Letzigrund, Zürich
Attendance: 30,585
Referee: Tom Henning Øvrebø (Norway)

17 June 2008
20:45

France	0–2	Italy
	Report	Pirlo 25' (pen.); De Rossi 62'

Letzigrund, Zürich
Attendance: 30,585
Referee: Ľuboš Micheľ (Slovakia)

=== Knockout stage ===
Quarter-finals

22 June 2008
20:45

Spain	0–0 (a.e.t.)	Italy
	Report
Penalties
Villa (penalty scored); Cazorla (penalty scored); Senna (penalty scored); Güiza (penalty missed); Fàbregas (penalty scored)	4–2	(penalty scored) Grosso; (penalty missed) De Rossi; (penalty scored) Camoranesi; (penalty missed) Di Natale

Ernst-Happel-Stadion, Vienna
Attendance: 51,178
Referee: Herbert Fandel (Germany)

== Euro 2012 ==
=== Group stage ===
Pos	Team	Pld	W	D	L	GF	GA	GD	Pts	Qualification
1	Spain	3	2	1	0	6	1	+5	7	Advance to knockout stage
2	Italy	3	1	2	0	4	2	+2	5	Advance to knockout stage
3	Croatia	3	1	1	1	4	3	+1	4	
4	Republic of Ireland	3	0	0	3	1	9	−8	0	

Source: UEFA
Rules for classification: Group stage tiebreakers
10 June 2012
18:00 CEST

Spain	1–1	Italy
Fàbregas 64'	Report	Di Natale 61'

PGE Arena, Gdańsk
Attendance: 38,869
Referee: Viktor Kassai (Hungary)

14 June 2012
18:00 CEST

Italy	1–1	Croatia
Pirlo 39'	Report	Mandžukić 72'

Stadion Miejski, Poznań
Attendance: 37,096
Referee: Howard Webb (England)

18 June 2012
20:45 CEST

Italy	2–0	Republic of Ireland
Cassano 35'; Balotelli 90'	Report

Stadion Miejski, Poznań
Attendance: 38,794
Referee: Cüneyt Çakır (Turkey)

=== Knockout stage ===
Quarter-finals

24 June 2012
21:45 EEST

England	0–0 (a.e.t.)	Italy
	Report
Penalties
Gerrard (penalty scored); Rooney (penalty scored); Young (penalty missed); Cole (penalty missed)	2–4	(penalty scored) Balotelli; (penalty missed) Montolivo; (penalty scored) Pirlo; (penalty scored) Nocerino; (penalty scored) Diamanti

Olympic Stadium, Kyiv
Attendance: 64,340
Referee: Pedro Proença (Portugal)

Semi-finals

28 June 2012
20:45 CEST

Germany	1–2	Italy
Özil 90+2' (pen.)	Report	Balotelli 20', 36'

National Stadium, Warsaw
Attendance: 55,540
Referee: Stéphane Lannoy (France)

Final

1 July 2012
21:45 EEST

Spain	4–0	Italy
Silva 14'; Alba 41'; Torres 84'; Mata 88'	Report

Olympic Stadium, Kyiv
Attendance: 63,170
Referee: Pedro Proença (Portugal)

== Euro 2016 ==
=== Group stage ===
Pos	Team	Pld	W	D	L	GF	GA	GD	Pts	Qualification
1	Italy	3	2	0	1	3	1	+2	6 (Note: Head-to-head result: Belgium 0–2 Italy.)	Advance to knockout stage
2	Belgium	3	2	0	1	4	2	+2	6	Advance to knockout stage
3	Republic of Ireland	3	1	1	1	2	4	−2	4	Advance to knockout stage
4	Sweden	3	0	1	2	1	3	−2	1	

Source: UEFA
Rules for classification: Group stage tiebreakers
Notes:
13 June 2016
21:00

Belgium	0–2	Italy
	Report	Giaccherini 32'; Pellè 90+3'

Parc Olympique Lyonnais, Décines-Charpieu
Attendance: 55,408
Referee: Mark Clattenburg (England)

17 June 2016
15:00

Italy	1–0	Sweden
Éder 88'	Report

Stadium Municipal, Toulouse
Attendance: 29,600
Referee: Viktor Kassai (Hungary)

22 June 2016
21:00

Italy	0–1	Republic of Ireland
	Report	Brady 85'

Stade Pierre-Mauroy, Villeneuve-d'Ascq
Attendance: 44,268
Referee: Ovidiu Hațegan (Romania)

=== Knockout stage ===
Round of 16

27 June 2016
18:00

Italy	2–0	Spain
Chiellini 33'; Pellè 90+1'	Report

Stade de France, Saint-Denis
Attendance: 76,165
Referee: Cüneyt Çakır (Turkey)

Quarter-finals

2 July 2016
21:00

Germany	1–1 (a.e.t.)	Italy
Özil 65'	Report	Bonucci 78' (pen.)
Penalties
Kroos (penalty scored); Müller (penalty missed); Özil (penalty missed); Draxler (penalty scored); Schweinsteiger (penalty missed); Hummels (penalty scored); Kimmich (penalty scored); Boateng (penalty scored); Hector (penalty scored)	6–5	(penalty scored) Insigne; (penalty missed) Zaza; (penalty scored) Barzagli; (penalty missed) Pellè; (penalty missed) Bonucci; (penalty scored) Giaccherini; (penalty scored) Parolo; (penalty scored) De Sciglio; (penalty missed) Darmian

Stade de Bordeaux, Bordeaux
Attendance: 38,764
Referee: Viktor Kassai (Hungary)

== Euro 2020 ==
=== Group stage ===
Pos	Team	Pld	W	D	L	GF	GA	GD	Pts	Qualification
1	Italy (H)	3	3	0	0	7	0	+7	9	Advance to knockout stage
2	Wales	3	1	1	1	3	2	+1	4 (Note: Tied on head-to-head result (Wales 1–1 Switzerland). Overall goal difference was used as the tiebreaker.)	Advance to knockout stage
3	Switzerland	3	1	1	1	4	5	−1	4	Advance to knockout stage
4	Turkey	3	0	0	3	1	8	−7	0	

Source: UEFA
Rules for classification: Group stage tiebreakers
(H) Hosts
Notes:
11 June 2021
21:00

Turkey	0–3	Italy
	Report	Demiral 53' (o.g.); Immobile 66'; Insigne 79'

Stadio Olimpico, Rome
Attendance: 12,916
Referee: Danny Makkelie (Netherlands)

16 June 2021
21:00

Italy	3–0	Switzerland
Locatelli 26', 52'; Immobile 89'	Report

Stadio Olimpico, Rome
Attendance: 12,445
Referee: Sergei Karasev (Russia)

20 June 2021
18:00

Italy	1–0	Wales
Pessina 39'	Report

Stadio Olimpico, Rome
Attendance: 11,541
Referee: Ovidiu Hațegan (Romania)

=== Knockout stage ===
Round of 16

26 June 2021
21:00 (20:00 UTC+1)

Italy	2–1 (a.e.t.)	Austria
Chiesa 95'; Pessina 105'	Report	Kalajdžić 114'

Wembley Stadium, London
Attendance: 18,910
Referee: Anthony Taylor (England)

Quarter-finals

2 July 2021
21:00

Belgium	1–2	Italy
Lukaku 45+2' (pen.)	Report	Barella 31'; Insigne 44'

Allianz Arena, Munich
Attendance: 12,984
Referee: Slavko Vinčić (Slovenia)

Semi-finals

6 July 2021
21:00 (20:00 UTC+1)

Italy	1–1 (a.e.t.)	Spain
Chiesa 60'	Report	Morata 80'
Penalties
Locatelli (penalty missed); Belotti (penalty scored); Bonucci (penalty scored); Bernardeschi (penalty scored); Jorginho (penalty scored)	4–2	(penalty missed) Olmo; (penalty scored) Gerard; (penalty scored) Thiago; (penalty missed) Morata

Wembley Stadium, London
Attendance: 57,811
Referee: Felix Brych (Germany)

Final

11 July 2021
21:00 (20:00 UTC+1)

Italy	1–1 (a.e.t.)	England
Bonucci 67'	Report	Shaw 2'
Penalties
Berardi (penalty scored); Belotti (penalty missed); Bonucci (penalty scored); Bernardeschi (penalty scored); Jorginho (penalty missed)	3–2	(penalty scored) Kane; (penalty scored) Maguire; (penalty missed) Rashford; (penalty missed) Sancho; (penalty missed) Saka

Wembley Stadium, London
Attendance: 67,173
Referee: Björn Kuipers (Netherlands)

== Euro 2024 ==
=== Group stage ===
Pos	Team	Pld	W	D	L	GF	GA	GD	Pts	Qualification
1	Spain	3	3	0	0	5	0	+5	9	Advance to knockout stage
2	Italy	3	1	1	1	3	3	0	4	Advance to knockout stage
3	Croatia	3	0	2	1	3	6	−3	2	
4	Albania	3	0	1	2	3	5	−2	1	

Source: UEFA
15 June 2024
21:00

Italy	2–1	Albania
Bastoni 11'; Barella 16'	Report	Bajrami 1'

Westfalenstadion, Dortmund
Attendance: 60,512
Referee: Felix Zwayer (Germany)

20 June 2024
21:00

Spain	1–0	Italy
Calafiori 55' (o.g.)	Report

Arena AufSchalke, Gelsenkirchen
Attendance: 49,528
Referee: Slavko Vinčić (Slovenia)

24 June 2024
21:00

Croatia	1–1	Italy
Modrić 55'	Report	Zaccagni 90+8'

Red Bull Arena, Leipzig
Attendance: 38,322
Referee: Danny Makkelie (Netherlands)

=== Knockout stage ===
Round of 16

29 June 2024
18:00

Switzerland	2–0	Italy
Freuler 37'; Vargas 46'	Report

Olympiastadion, Berlin
Attendance: 68,172
Referee: Szymon Marciniak (Poland)

== Player records ==
Players in bold are still active for the national team.

=== Most appearances ===
Rank	Player	Matches	European Championships
1	Leonardo Bonucci	18	2012, 2016 and 2020
2	Gianluigi Buffon	17	2004, 2008, 2012 and 2016
2	Giorgio Chiellini	17	2008, 2012, 2016 and 2020
4	Antonio Cassano	13	2004, 2008 and 2012
4	Alessandro Del Piero	13	1996, 2000, 2004 and 2008
4	Paolo Maldini	13	1988, 1996 and 2000
7	Daniele De Rossi	12	2008, 2012 and 2016
8	**Federico Chiesa**	11	2020 and 2024
8	**Gianluigi Donnarumma**	11	2020 and 2024
8	Andrea Pirlo	11	2004, 2008 and 2012
8	Gianluca Zambrotta	11	2000, 2004 and 2008

=== Top goalscorers ===
Rank	Player	Goals	European Championships (goals)
1	Mario Balotelli	3	2012 (3)
1	Antonio Cassano	3	2004 (2), 2008 and 2012 (1)
3	Leonardo Bonucci	2	2012, 2016 (1) and 2020 (1)
3	**Nicolò Barella**	2	2020 (1) and 2024 (1)
3	Pierluigi Casiraghi	2	1996 (2)
3	**Federico Chiesa**	2	2020 (2) and 2024
3	Ciro Immobile	2	2016 and 2020 (2)
3	Lorenzo Insigne	2	2016 and 2020 (2)
3	Filippo Inzaghi	2	2000 (2)
3	**Manuel Locatelli**	2	2020 (2)
3	Graziano Pellè	2	2016 (2)
3	Matteo Pessina	2	2020 (2)
3	Andrea Pirlo	2	2004, 2008 (1) and 2012 (1)
3	Francesco Totti	2	2000 (2) and 2004

== See also ==
- Italy at the FIFA Confederations Cup
- Italy at the FIFA World Cup
