= 1970 FIFA World Cup qualification – UEFA Group 6 =

Football tournament qualification stage

The 1970 FIFA World Cup qualification UEFA Group 6 was a UEFA qualifying group for the 1970 FIFA World Cup. The group comprised Belgium, Finland, Spain and Yugoslavia.

== Standings ==
Rank	Team	Pld	W	D	L	GF	GA	GD	Pts
1	Belgium	6	4	1	1	14	8	+6	9
2	Yugoslavia	6	3	1	2	19	7	+12	7
3	Spain	6	2	2	2	10	6	+4	6
4	Finland	6	1	0	5	6	28	−22	2

== Matches ==
19 June 1968

Finland	1–2	Belgium
Flink 15'	Report	Devrindt 85'; Polleunis 89'

Helsinki Olympic Stadium, Helsinki
Referee: Zvieriev (Soviet Union)

25 September 1968

Yugoslavia	9–1	Finland
Zambata 9', 73', 87'; Musemić 39', 57', 90'; Džajić 58', 65'; Osim 62'	Report	Tolsa 88'

JNA Stadium, Belgrade
Referee: Chukov (Bulgaria)

9 October 1968

Belgium	6–1	Finland
Puis 16' (pen.), 77'; Polleunis 30', 39', 63'; Semmeling 49'	Report	Lindholm 82' (pen.)

Regenboogstadion, Waregem
Referee: Biroczky (Hungary)

16 October 1968

Belgium	3–0	Yugoslavia
Devrindt 35', 73'; Polleunis 84'	Report

Émile Versé Stadium, Brussels
Referee: Krnavek (Czechoslovakia)

27 October 1968

Yugoslavia	0–0	Spain
	Report

Stadion Crvene Zvezde, Belgrade
Referee: Ferdinand Marschall (Austria)

11 December 1968

Spain	1–1	Belgium
Gárate 75'	Report	Devrindt 3'

Santiago Bernabéu, Madrid
Referee: Garcia (Portugal)

23 February 1969

Belgium	2–1	Spain
Devrindt 33', 81'	Report	Asensi 82'

Stade de Sclessin, Liège
Referee: Sörensen (Denmark)

30 April 1969

Spain	2–1	Yugoslavia
Bustillo 20'; Amancio 27'	Report	Pavlović 67'

Camp Nou, Barcelona
Referee: Rudolf Scheurer (Switzerland)

4 June 1969

Finland	1–5	Yugoslavia
Tolsa 20'	Report	Džajić 14'; Bukal 22', 77'; Pirić 40'; Sprečo 60'

Helsinki Olympic Stadium, Helsinki
Referee: Eksztajn (Poland)

25 June 1969

Finland	2–0	Spain
Lindholm 7'; Tolsa 20'	Report

Helsinki Olympic Stadium, Helsinki
Referee: Manning (East Germany)

15 October 1969

Spain	6–0	Finland
Pirri 5'; Gárate 18', 42'; Velázquez 21'; Amancio 44'; Quino 86'	Report

Estadio Municipal, La Línea
Referee: Helies (France)

19 October 1969

Yugoslavia	4–0	Belgium
Belin 2'; Spasovski 31', 33'; Džajić 51'	Report

Stadion Gradski Park, Skopje
Referee: Piotrowicz (Poland)
