= Gennady Logofet =

Soviet and Russian football player

- Logofet as an assistant in 1988

Personal information
- Full name: Gennady Olegovich Logofet
- Date of birth: 15 April 1942
- Place of birth: Moscow, USSR
- Date of death: 5 December 2011 (aged 69)
- Place of death: Moscow, Russia
- Position: Defender

Youth career
- FShM Moscow

Senior career*
Years	Team	Apps	(Gls)
1960–1975	Spartak Moscow	349	(27)

International career
1963–1970	USSR	17	(0)

Managerial career
- 1978: USSR U-21 (assistant)
- 1980–1982: USSR (assistant)
- 1984: Tavriya Simferopol
- 1988: USSR U-21 (assistant)
- 1992–1993: Sharjah FC (assistant)
- 2001: Spartak Moscow (assistant)
- 2005–2008: Maccabi Moscow
- * Club domestic league appearances and goals

Gennady Olegovich Logofet (Russian: Геннадий Олегович Логофет; 15 April 1942 – 5 December 2011) was a Soviet and Russian football player and football coach.

== Career ==
Logofet earned 17 caps for the USSR national team as a defender between 1963 and 1970, and participated in UEFA Euro 1968 and the 1970 FIFA World Cup in Mexico. He spent his 15-year career with Spartak Moscow.

He was a coach of the USSR Under-21s, an assistant with the national team and Spartak, and the coach of FC Maccabi Moscow.

== Honours ==
Spartak Moscow

- Soviet Top League: 1962, 1969
- Soviet Cup: 1963, 1965, 1971
