= Pusto Šilovo =

Pusto Šilovo Пусто Шилово (Serbian)
- Village
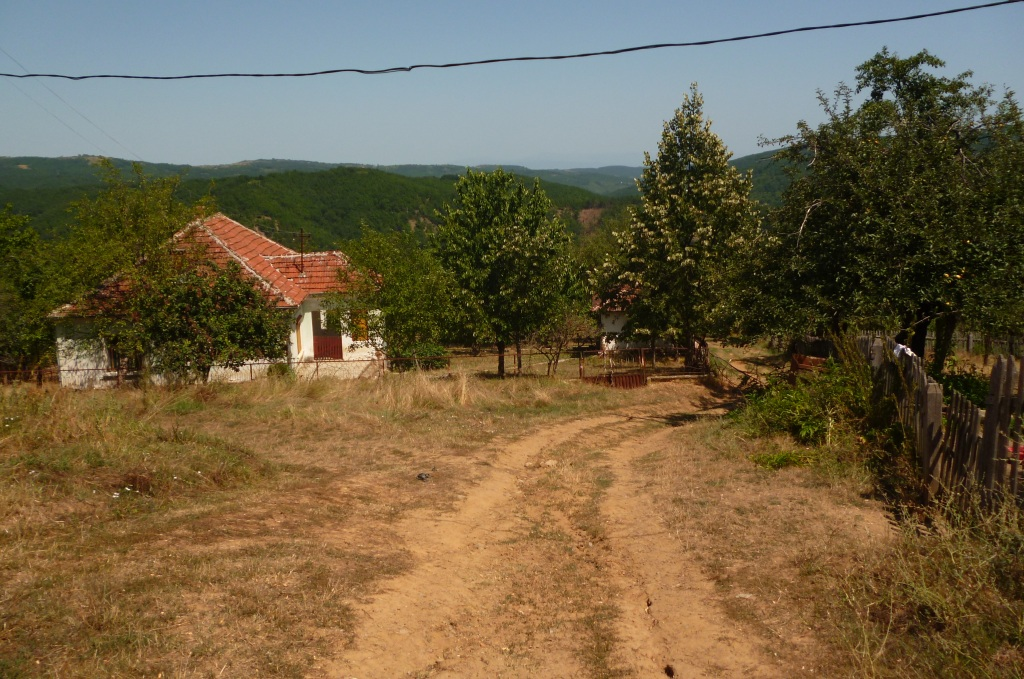
- Motto: Pitomo Šilovo
- Location within Serbia
- Coordinates: 42°52′18″N 21°34′08″E
- Country: Serbia
- District: Jablanica District
- Municipality: Medveđa

Government

Population (2002)
  - Total: 74
- Time zone: UTC+1 (CET)
  - Summer (DST): UTC+2 (CEST)

Pusto Šilovo (Serbian Cyrillic: Пусто Шилово) is a village in the municipality of Medveđa, Serbia. According to the 2002 census, the village has a population of 74 people.

== History ==
Pusto Šilovo is a village located on a mountainous area, rich in mineral resources. It is a site of historically important achievements of culture and faith, such as early Christian shrines. The inhabitants of this area are mostly immigrants from Montenegro, dating back to 1878 in some cases.

== Notable people ==
- Blagoje Paunović
