= Blagoje Paunović =

Serbian footballer and manager (1947–2014)

Personal information
- Full name: Blagoje Paunović
- Date of birth: 4 June 1947
- Place of birth: Pusto Šilovo, SR Serbia, FPR Yugoslavia
- Date of death: 9 December 2014 (aged 67)
- Place of death: Belgrade, Serbia
- Position: Defender

Youth career
- 1958–1965: Partizan

Senior career*
Years	Team	Apps	(Gls)
1965–1975	Partizan	225	(0)
1975–1977	Utrecht	37	(0)
1977	Kikinda	7	(0)
1978	Oakland Stompers	23	(0)
1979	Sinđelić Beograd		

International career
1967–1973	Yugoslavia	39	(0)

Managerial career
- 1994: Logroñés
- 1999–2002: Teleoptik
- 2002–2003: Budućnost Banatski Dvor
- 2005–2006: Teleoptik (joint)
- 2009–2010: Smederevo
- 2010–2011: BASK
Medal record
Men's Football
Representing Yugoslavia
European Championship
Silver medal – second place	1968 Italy	Team
- * Club domestic league appearances and goals

Blagoje Paunović (Serbian Cyrillic: Благоје Пауновић; 4 June 1947 – 9 December 2014) was a Serbian football defender and manager.

== Playing career ==
Born in Pusto Šilovo, Socialist Republic of Serbia, Socialist Federal Republic of Yugoslavia, he started his youth career in FK Partizan as a nine-year-old, although minimum age required to start playing for Partizan youths was ten. He was spotted by Partizan coach Virgil Popescu who insisted in bringing him over. Apart from short spell abroad, Blagoje spent most of his time in Partizan and, as a player or coach, he was part of Partizan for almost half a century. Paunović played for ten seasons with FK Partizan, amassing nearly 300 official appearances with the Belgrade club. During the 70's, he formed an efficient backline alongside Dragan Holcer and Miroslav Pavlović.

At 28, in 1975, Paunović joined FC Utrecht in the Netherlands. After two seasons abroad he returned home for a spell with OFK Kikinda, played briefly in the United States by representing the Oakland Stompers of the North American Soccer League and closed out his career also in his country's capital, with lowly FK Sinđelić; whilst in North America, he played under the name Paki Paunovich.

On the international level, Paunović played a total of 39 matches for Yugoslavia, making his debut on 12 November 1967 in a 4–0 home win against Albania for the UEFA Euro 1968 qualifiers, and participating at the final stages in Italy.

== Coaching career ==
In the 1994–95 campaign Paunović, already a coach, was one of five managers in charge of Spain's CD Logroñés, which ranked last in La Liga with an all-time low 13 points. In 2009, after a long spell with Partizan's youth teams, he signed with Serbian first division side FK Smederevo.

== Personal life ==
Paunović's son, Veljko, was also a footballer and later manager of Chicago Fire, Reading, and the Serbian U18, U19, and U20 teams. He too started his extensive career with Partizan, but played mainly in Spain.
