= Maccabi Moscow =

- Full name: футбольный клуб Маккаби Москва (Football Club "Maccabi" Moscow)
- Founded: 2003
- Dissolved: 2010
- League: Amateur Football League, Centre Region (Moscow)
- 2009: 19
| Home colours | Away colours |

FC Maccabi Moscow (Russian: футбольный клуб Маккаби Москва) was a Russian amateur association football club, based in Moscow. The club was founded by the Russian Jewish businessman Pavel Feldblum in 2003, from the Jewish Community of Moscow. It became bankrupt in 2010, and dissolved that same year.

== Honors and Trophy ==
- Inter-nations League of Moscow: 2004
- European Trophy of Maccabi: Second place 2006
