= Ilija Pantelić =

Yugoslav and Serbian footballer (1942–2014)

- Pantelić with Paris Saint-Germain in 1976

Personal information
- Date of birth: 2 August 1942
- Place of birth: Banja Luka, Independent State of Croatia
- Date of death: 17 November 2014 (aged 72)
- Place of death: Novi Sad, Serbia
- Height: 1.85 m (6 ft 1 in)
- Position: Goalkeeper

Youth career
- 1958–1960: BAK Bela Crkva

Senior career*
Years	Team	Apps	(Gls)
1960–1961	Radnički Sombor	11	(0)
1961–1969	Vojvodina	176	(6)
1969–1970	Paris-Neuilly	45	(0)
1971	Marseille	2	(0)
1971–1974	Bastia	108	(0)
1974–1977	Paris Saint-Germain	98	(0)
Total		440	(6)

International career
1964–1968	Yugoslavia	18	(0)

Managerial career
- 1977: Paris Saint-Germain (interim)
Medal record
Silver medal – second place	UEFA European Championship	1968
- * Club domestic league appearances and goals

Ilija Pantelić (Serbian Cyrillic: Илија Пантелић; 2 August 1942 – 17 November 2014) was a Yugoslav and Serbian professional footballer who played as a goalkeeper.

== Club career ==
After playing for Radnički Sombor in the Yugoslav Second League, Pantelić spent eight seasons at Yugoslav First League side Vojvodina between 1961 and 1969. He collected 176 league appearances and netted six goals, helping them win the title in the 1965–66 season. During his time at the club, Pantelić managed to score a hat-trick in a league game against Trešnjevka, as well as a goal against Atlético Madrid in the first leg of the 1966–67 European Cup second round.

In 1969, Pantelić moved to France and joined Paris-Neuilly, before switching to Marseille. He also played for Bastia (1971–1974) and Paris Saint-Germain (1974–1977), amassing over 200 appearances in the top flight of French football.

== International career ==
At international level, Pantelić was capped 18 times for Yugoslavia from 1964 to 1968. He represented the country at UEFA Euro 1968, as Yugoslavia lost to Italy in the final.

== Post-playing career ==
After hanging up his boots, Pantelić served as the director of Vojvodina's youth academy for many years.

== Honours ==
Vojvodina

- Yugoslav First League: 1965–66

Marseille

- French Division 1: 1970–71

Yugoslavia

- UEFA European Championship runner-up: 1968

== See also ==
- List of footballers who achieved hat-trick records
