= Milan Damjanović =

Yugoslavian and Serbian footballer

Personal information
- Date of birth: 15 October 1943
- Place of birth: Golubić, Independent State of Croatia
- Date of death: 23 May 2006 (aged 62)
- Place of death: Belgrade, Serbia and Montenegro
- Height: 1.73 m (5 ft 8 in)
- Position: Defender

Senior career*
Years	Team	Apps	(Gls)
1962–1971	Partizan	154	(1)
1971–1976	Angers	158	(2)
1976–1977	Le Mans	15	(0)
Total		327	(3)

International career
1967–1968	Yugoslavia	7	(0)
Medal record
Men's Football
Representing Yugoslavia
European Championship
Silver medal – second place	1968 Italy	Team
- * Club domestic league appearances and goals

Milan Damjanović (Serbian Cyrillic: Милан Дамјановић, pronounced [mǐlan damjǎnoʋitɕ]; 15 October 1943 – 23 May 2006) was a Yugoslavian and Serbian football defender.

== Career ==
Born in Golubić, near Knin, Damjanović totalled 4 goals in 355 matches for Partizan.

At an international level, he played seven matches for the Yugoslavia national team and was a participant at Euro 1968.

He also had a coaching career mainly in France, Zambia and Yugoslavia. His nickname was Gica.
