= Antonio Juliano =

Italian footballer (1942–2023)

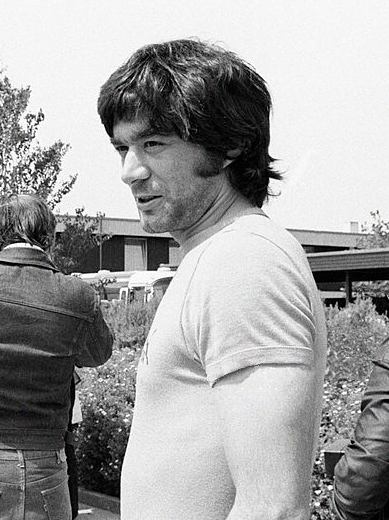
- Juliano in 1974

Personal information
- Date of birth: 26 December 1942
- Place of birth: Naples, Italy
- Date of death: 13 December 2023 (aged 80)
- Place of death: Naples, Italy
- Height: 1.76 m (5 ft 9 in)
- Position: Midfielder

Youth career
- 1956–1962: Napoli

Senior career*
Years	Team	Apps	(Gls)
1962–1978	Napoli	394	(26)
1978–1979	Bologna	15	(2)
Total		409	(28)

International career
1966–1974	Italy	18	(0)
Medal record
Men's football
Representing Italy (as player)
UEFA European Championship
Winner	1968 Italy
FIFA World Cup
Runner-up	1970 Mexico
- * Club domestic league appearances and goals

Antonio Juliano (Italian pronunciation: [anˈtɔːnjo juˈljaːno]; 26 December 1942 – 13 December 2023) was an Italian footballer who played as a midfielder.

== Club career ==
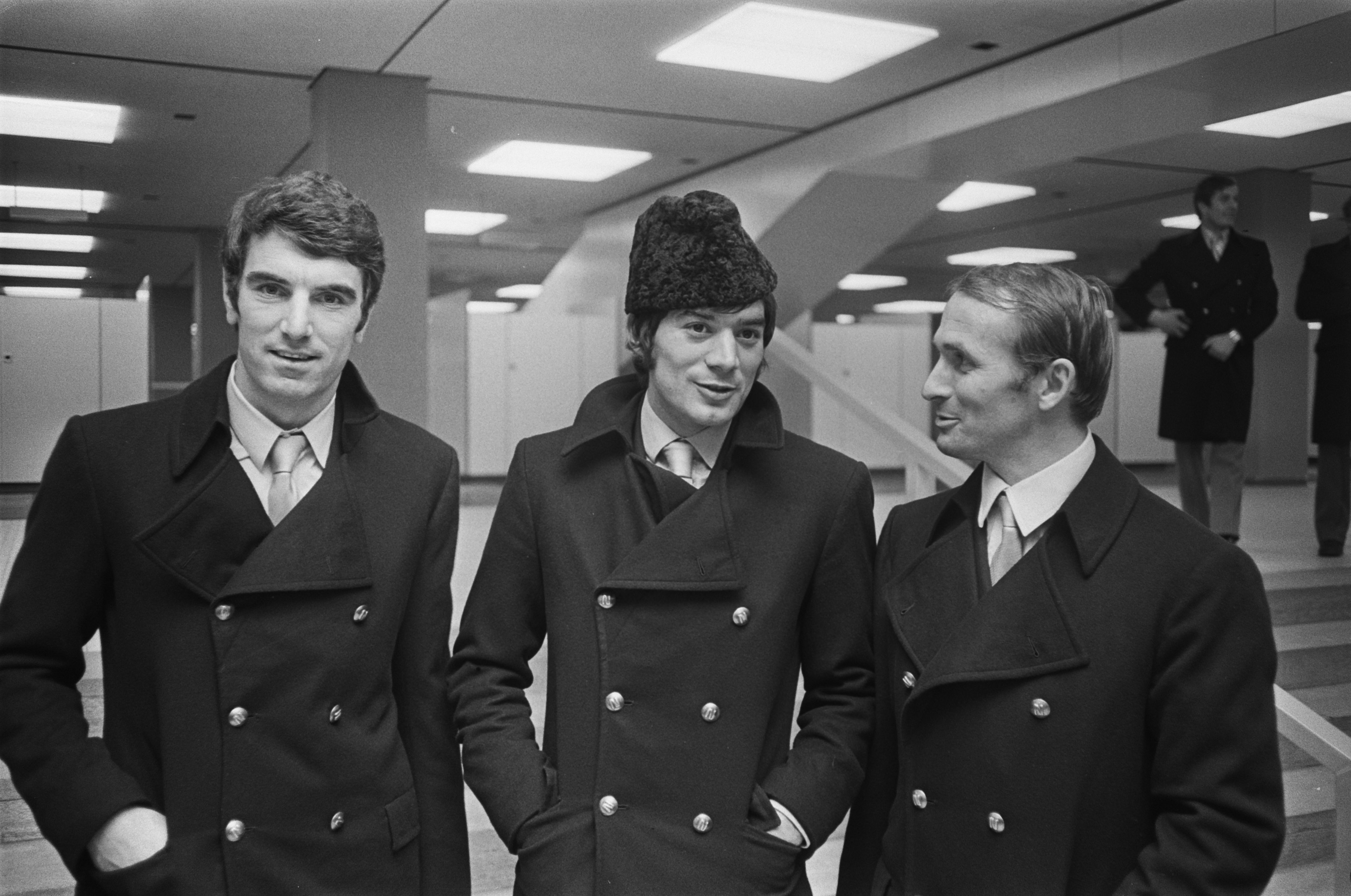
Juliano (middle) with Dino Zoff (left) and Kurt Hamrin, 1970

Born in Naples on 26 December 1942, Juliano spent the majority of his club career at home-town club Napoli, after coming through their youth ranks; he won two Coppa Italia (in 1962 and 1976), as well as the Coppa delle Alpi (in 1966) and the Anglo-Italian League Cup (in 1976).

After leaving Napoli in 1978, he played for one more season with Bologna, before retiring in 1979.

== International career ==
Juliano earned 18 caps for the Italian senior national team between 1966 and 1974, and was a member of the squad that won UEFA Euro 1968.

Juliano was also included in the Italian squad for three different FIFA World Cups, having taken part in the competition in 1966, in 1970 – where the Azzurri finished as runners-up – and in 1974. However, he only ever played one World Cup match, coming on as a substitute in a 4–1 defeat to Brazil in the 1970 World Cup final.

== Style of play ==
A creative playmaker, Juliano was renowned in particular for his leadership skills, as well as his vision, ball control, stamina, and passing range.

== After retirement ==
After retiring, Juliano returned to Napoli as a sporting director; while serving in this role, he oversaw the acquisitions of several players that contributed to the club's first national title in 1987, including Ruud Krol and Diego Maradona.

== Death ==
Juliano died in Naples on 13 December 2023, at the age of 80, following a short period of hospitalization.

== Honours ==
Napoli

- Coppa Italia: 1961–62, 1975–76
- Coppa delle Alpi: 1966
- Anglo-Italian League Cup: 1976

Italy

- UEFA European Championship: 1968
- FIFA World Cup runner-up: 1970
