= Aleksandr Lenyov =

Soviet Russian footballer (1944–2021)

- Aleksandr Lenyov (right) and Eduard Streltsov

Personal information
- Full name: Aleksandr Ivanovich Lenyov
- Date of birth: 25 September 1944
- Place of birth: Stalinogorsk, Russian SFSR, USSR
- Date of death: 12 November 2021 (aged 77)
- Positions: Midfielder; defender

Senior career*
Years	Team	Apps	(Gls)
1964	Shinnik Yaroslavl	17	(1)
1965–1971	Torpedo Moscow	164	(24)
1971	Volga Gorky		
1972	FC Torpedo Kutaisi	29	(4)
1973–1974	Metallurg Tula		

International career
1966–1968	USSR	10	(0)
- * Club domestic league appearances and goals

Aleksandr Ivanovich Lenyov (Russian: Александр Иванович Ленёв; 25 September 1944 – 12 November 2021) was a Soviet and Russian former professional footballer who played as a midfielder or defender.

== International career ==
Lenyov earned ten caps for the USSR national team, and participated in UEFA Euro 1968.

== Honours ==
- Soviet Top League: 1965
- Soviet Cup: 1968

== Death ==
He died on 12 November 2021, after a long illness.
