= Volodymyr Kaplychnyi =

Ukrainian footballer (1944–2004)

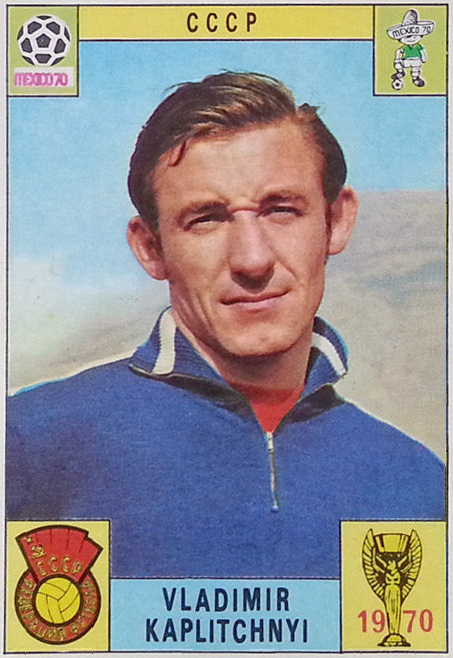

Personal information
- Full name: Volodymyr Oleksandrovych Kaplychnyi
- Date of birth: 26 February 1944
- Place of birth: Kamianets-Podilskyi, Ukrainian SSR, Soviet Union
- Date of death: 19 April 2004 (aged 60)
- Place of death: Kyiv, Ukraine
- Height: 1.81 m (5 ft 11 in)
- Position: Defender

Senior career*
Years	Team	Apps	(Gls)
1962–1963	FC Dynamo Khmelnytskyi	?	
1964–1965	SKA Lviv	?	
1966–1975	CSKA Moscow	288	(5)

International career
1968–1974	USSR	62	(0)

Managerial career
- 1978: CSKA Moscow (assistant)
- 1979–1980: SKA Lviv
- 1981: SKA Kyiv (technical director)
- 1983–1984: SKA Odesa
Medal record
Representing Soviet Union
Olympic Games
Bronze medal – third place	1972 Munich	Team competition
UEFA European Championship
Silver medal – second place	1972 Belgium
- * Club domestic league appearances and goals

Volodymyr Oleksandrovych Kaplychnyi (Ukrainian: Володимир Олександрович Капличний; 26 February 1944 – 19 April 2004) was a Ukrainian association football defender.

During his career he played for FC Dynamo Khmelnitsky (1962–1963), SKA Lviv (1964–1965) and PFC CSKA Moscow (1966–1975). He earned 62 caps for the USSR national football team, and participated in UEFA Euro 1968, the 1970 FIFA World Cup, and UEFA Euro 1972. He also earned a bronze medal at the 1972 Olympics.
