= Yuri Pshenichnikov =

Soviet footballer and coach (1940–2019)

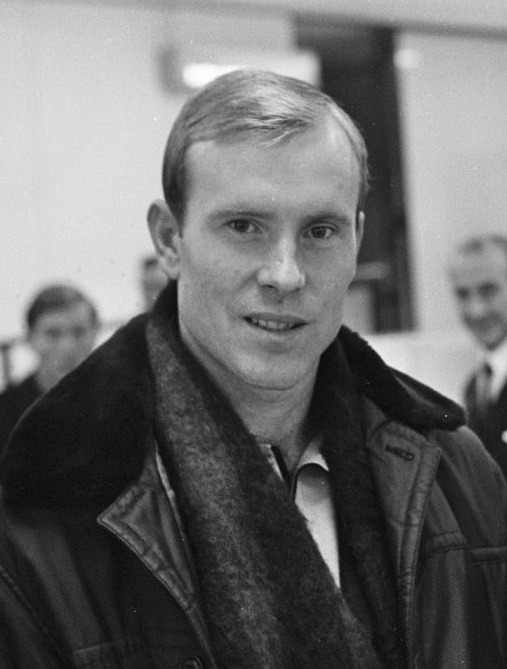
- Yuri Pshenichnikov in 1967

Personal information
- Full name: Yuri Pavlovich Pshenichnikov
- Date of birth: 2 June 1940
- Place of birth: Tashkent, USSR
- Date of death: 20 December 2019 (aged 79)
- Place of death: Moscow, Russia
- Height: 1.82 m (6 ft 0 in)
- Position: Goalkeeper

Youth career
- 1956–1957: Trudovye Rezervy Tashkent

Senior career*
Years	Team	Apps	(Gls)
1958–1959	Trudovye Rezervy Tashkent		
1960–1967	FC Pakhtakor Tashkent	177	(0)
1968–1971	CSKA Moscow	66	(0)
1972	FC Pakhtakor Tashkent	21	(0)

International career
1966–1970	USSR	19	(0)

Managerial career
- 1978: CSKA Moscow (assistant)
- 1979–1983: Conthab (Laos)
- 1989: Consfab Antananarivu (Madagascar)
- 1990: FC SKA Rostov-on-Don
- 1991: FC Presnya Moscow (assistant)
- 1992: FC Presnya Moscow (director)
- 1993: FC Asmaral Moscow (assistant)
- 1994–1995: Ras AlKhaima Club
- 1999–2000: CSKA Moscow (goalkeeping coach)
- 2005–2007: FC Dynamo Moscow (goalkeeping coach)
- 2008–: FC Spartak-2 Moscow (goalkeeping coach)
- * Club domestic league appearances and goals

Yuri Pavlovich Pshenichnikov (Russian: Юрий Павлович Пшеничников; 2 June 1940 – 20 December 2019) was a Soviet football goalkeeper and coach, born in Tashkent.

== Honours ==
- Soviet Top League winner: 1970.
- Soviet Goalkeeper of the Year: 1968.
- Lao League winner: 1981, 1982 (as a manager).
- Lao Cup winner: 1980 (as a manager).

== International career ==
He earned 19 caps for the USSR national football team, and participated in UEFA Euro 1968.
