= José María Ortiz de Mendíbil =

Spanish football referee (1926–2015)

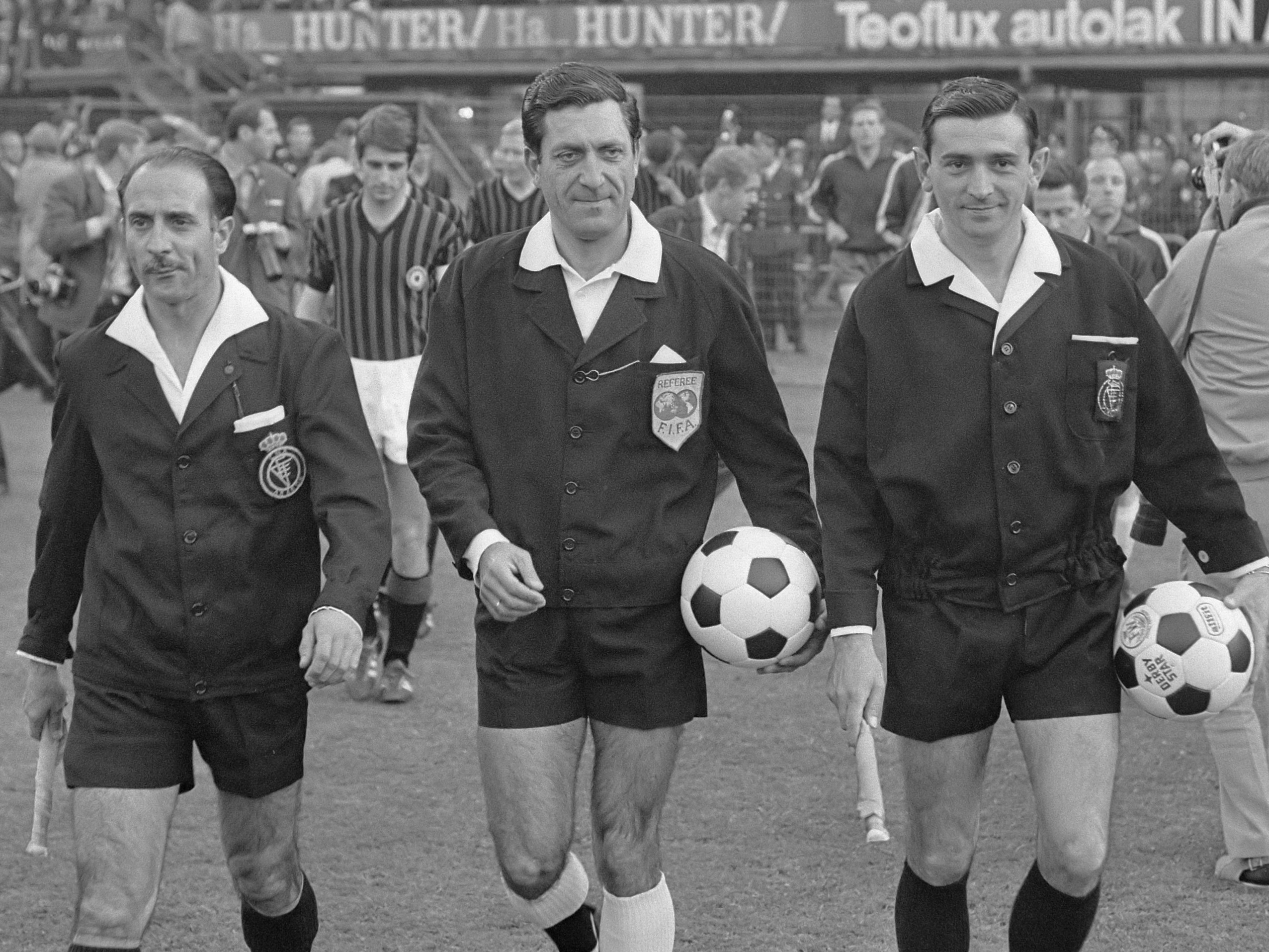
José María Ortiz (center) with Linesmen in 1968

José María Ortiz de Mendíbil Monasterio (11 August 1926 – 15 September 2015), also known as José María Ortiz, was a Spanish referee, active from 1953 to 1973. He was the referee of the replay of the UEFA Euro 1968 final.

== Life and career ==
Mendíbil was born in Portugalete, Basque Country, Spain.

During his 18 seasons in La Liga, between the 1953–54 and 1972–73 seasons, he led 241 league games. He was promoted to international status during the 1958–59 season, and remained active at international level until the end of his career. He refereed 33 international matches, including, among others, the 1969 European Cup final between AC Milan and Ajax (4–1), two World Cup matches in 1970: West Germany–Bulgaria and the semi-final between eventual champions Brazil and Uruguay (3–1). He was also the referee of the replay of the UEFA Euro 1968 final, in which hosts Italy defeated Yugoslavia 2–0 at the Stadio Olimpico in Rome.

At club level, Mendíbil was also the referee of two European Cup semi-finals in 1965 and in 1971. as well as three European Cup Winners' Cup semi-finals in 1966, 1968 and 1970. He officiated the controversial match in which Inter Milan beat Liverpool 3–0 in the second leg of the 1964–65 European Cup semi-final; his officiating later led to claims by English press that he had accepted bribes to facilitate an Inter Milan victory, in particular for giving an indirect free kick, which was subsequently scored directly by Mario Corso, and for an hypothetical foul of Peiró on goalkeeper Tommy Lawrence on the second goal.

On 24 May 1972, he took charge of the European Cup Winners' Cup final played at the Camp Nou in Barcelona. The match between Rangers of Scotland and Russia's Dynamo Moscow served up a five goal thriller, with Rangers running out 3–2 victors in the end.

In his retirement, he was a partner in UEFA and pioneer in Spain with the programs of TVE, where he worked for 5 years, apart from collaborating in programs Cadena SER and Tele Bilbao. He died in Algorta, Spain in September 2015.

== Major matches refereed ==
Date	Match	Tournament	Venue	Result	Ref
10 June 1968	Italy vs. Yugoslavia	UEFA Euro 1968 final (replay)	Stadio Olimpico, Rome	2–0	
28 May 1969	Ajax vs. AC Milan	1969 European Cup final	Santiago Bernabéu Stadium, Madrid	1–4	
24 May 1972	Rangers vs. Dynamo Moscow	1972 European Cup Winners' Cup final	Camp Nou, Barcelona	3–2	
