= Angelo Domenghini =

Italian footballer and manager (born 1941)

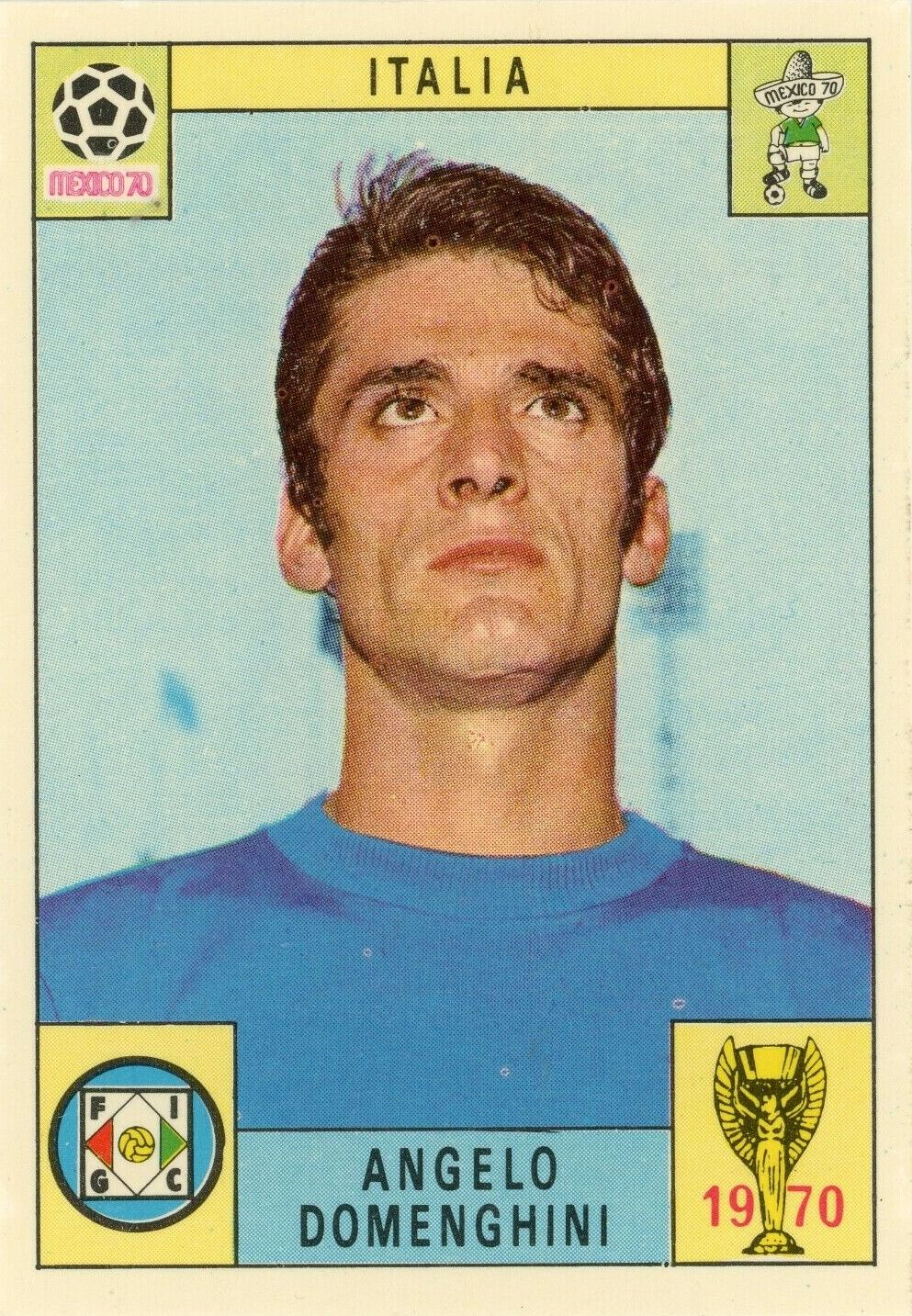
- Domenghini in 1970

Personal information
- Date of birth: 25 August 1941 (age 85)
- Place of birth: Lallio, Italy
- Height: 1.75 m (5 ft 9 in)
- Positions: Forward; winger

Senior career*
Years	Team	Apps	(Gls)
1960–1964	Atalanta	69	(17)
1964–1969	Inter Milan	134	(50)
1969–1973	Cagliari	99	(18)
1973–1974	Roma	30	(4)
1974–1976	Hellas Verona	28	(3)
1976–1977	Foggia	17	(4)
1977–1978	Olbia	21	(10)
1978–1979	Trento	19	(3)
Total		417	(109)

International career
1963–1972	Italy	33	(7)

Managerial career
- 1977–1978: Olbia
- 1980–1981: Asti
- 1982–1983: Derthona
- 1983–1984: Torres
- 1984–1985: Derthona
- 1986–1987: Derthona
- 1987–1988: Sambenedettese
- 1989–1990: Novara
- 1990–1991: Derthona
- 1991–1992: Battipagliese
- 1995–1996: Inter Milan Primavera
Medal record
Men's football
Representing Italy (as player)
UEFA European Championship
Winner	1968 Italy
FIFA World Cup
Runner-up	1970 Mexico
- * Club domestic league appearances and goals

Angelo Domenghini (Italian pronunciation: [ˈandʒelo domeŋˈɡiːni]; born 25 August 1941) is an Italian football manager, and former player, who played as a forward, often as a right winger, or even as a striker. Despite his creative role, he also had a notable eye for goal, as well as excellent technical ability, which, along with his acceleration and agility, allowed him to beat players with the ball, in particular during one on one situations. He represented Italy in their victorious UEFA Euro 1968 campaign, as well as at the 1970 FIFA World Cup, where they finished in second place, playing in the finals of both tournaments.

As a manager, he coached several clubs, including Derthona on several occasions, and Torres, at the beginning of the 1983–84 season.

== Club career ==
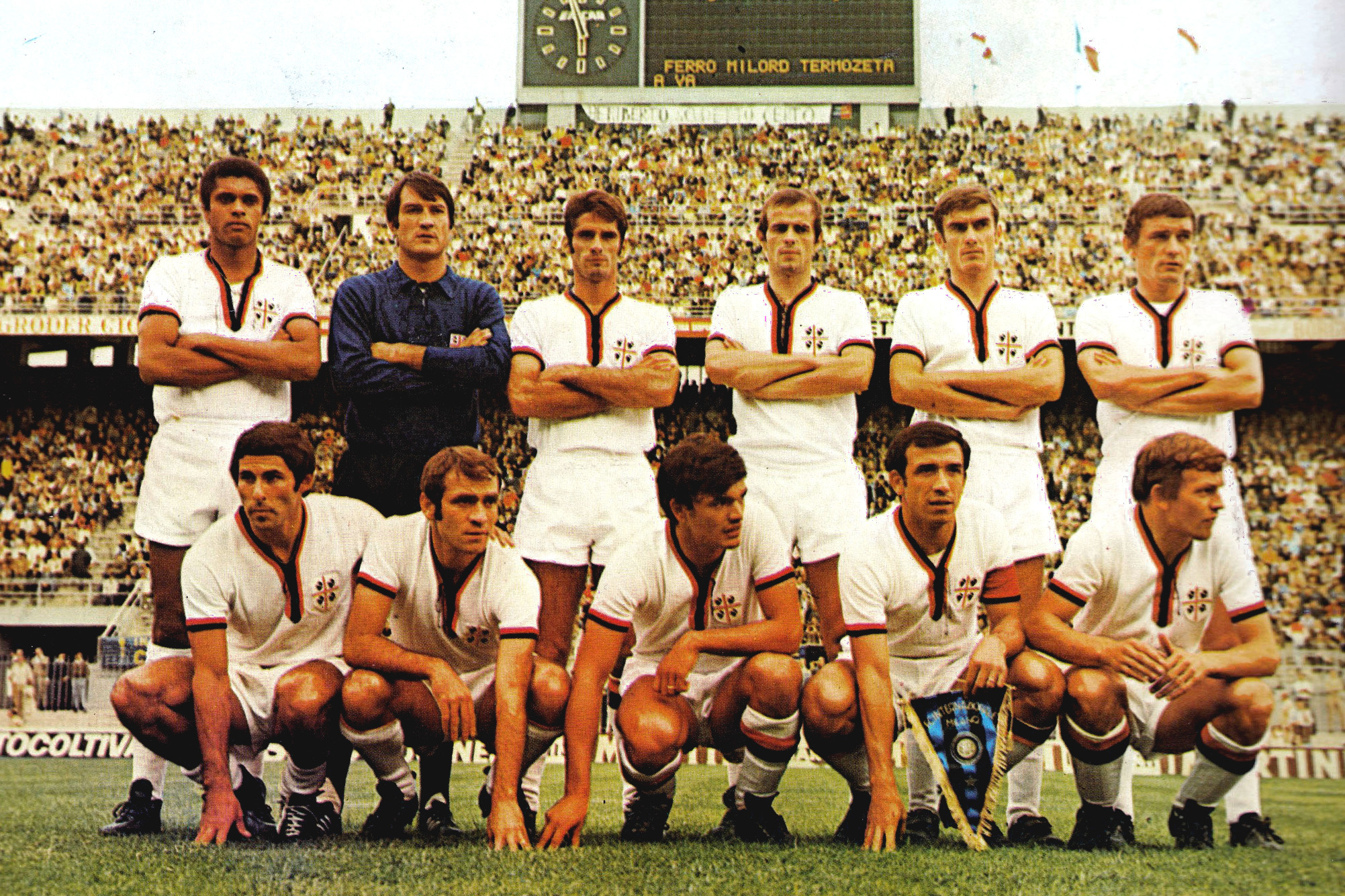
Domenghini (standing, third from left) with the 1969–70 Italian champions Cagliari at San Siro

Born in Lallio, province of Bergamo, he began his professional career with his local club Atalanta in 1960, winning the Coppa Italia in 1963, and finishing the tournament as the top goalscorer with five goals, also scoring a hat-trick in the final against Torino. He then moved to Inter Milan in 1964, and was a member of manager Helenio Herrera's highly successful "Grande Inter" squad; he played 164 times for the club, scoring 54 goals, winning two Serie A titles, two Intercontinental Cups, and a European Cup.

He also later played for Cagliari, forming a notable attacking trio alongside Gigi Riva and Sergio "Bobo" Gori, as they went on to win the Serie A title during the 1969–70 season, Domenghini's first season with the club. He later played with A.S. Roma for the 1973–74 season, subsequently moving Serie B side Verona in 1974, for two seasons, helping them gain promotion to Serie A in 1975. He then played one more final season in Serie A with Foggia, before playing in the Serie C lower divisions, with Olbia for one season, and subsequently for Trento for a single Serie C1 season, before retiring in 1979. In total, he made 390 appearances in Serie A, scoring 98 goals.

== International career ==
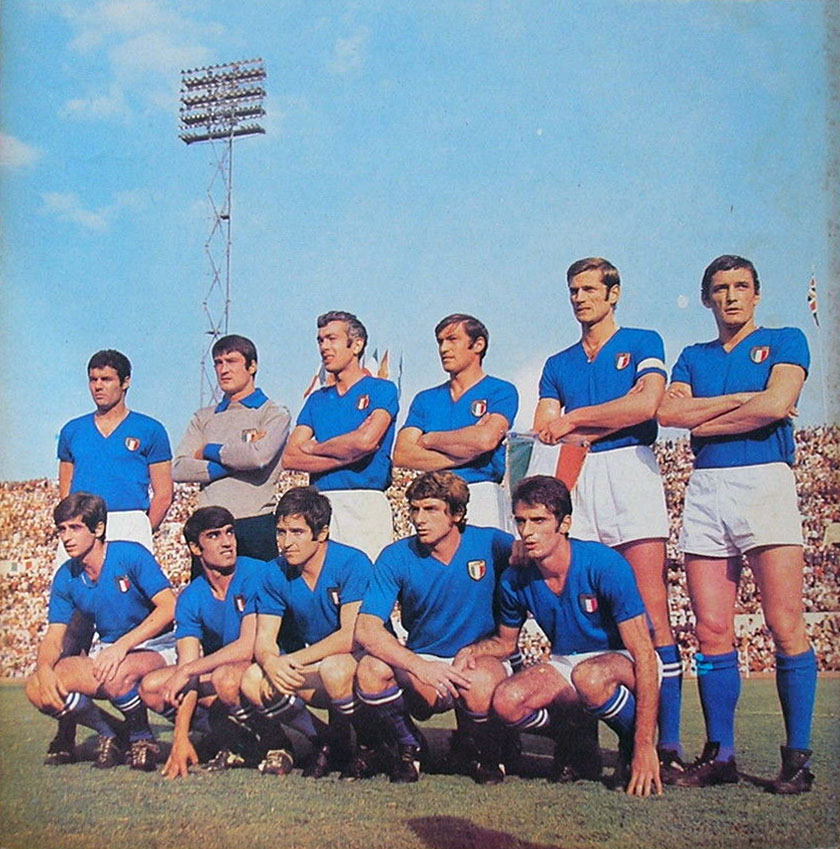
Domenghini (kneeling, first from the right) with the Italy national team in 1969

Domenghini was capped on 33 occasions for Italy, scoring 8 goals for his country between 1963 and 1972. He represented Italy at UEFA Euro 1968 on home soil, and in the European Championship final, he notably scored the equaliser in the 80th minute against Yugoslavia from a powerful free-kick, after Italy had been trailing 1–0; this was Italy's first goal in a European Championship. Italy then went on to win the replay 2–0, which allowed them to win their first ever European Championship title; Domenghini was later named to the Team of the Tournament for his performances.

He later went on to take part in the 1970 FIFA World Cup with Italy, scoring a goal in Italy's opening 1–0 win over Sweden in the group stage, helping them to move on to the knockout round. Italy would eventually reach the final, only to lose 4–1 to Brazil.

== Honours ==
Atalanta

- Coppa Italia: 1962–63

Inter Milan

- Serie A: 1964–65, 1965–66
- European Cup: 1964–65
- Intercontinental Cup: 1964, 1965

Cagliari

- Serie A: 1969–70

Italy

- UEFA European Championship: 1968
- FIFA World Cup runner-up: 1970

Individual

- Coppa Italia top scorer: 1962–63
- UEFA European Championship Team of the Tournament: 1968
