= Dragan Džajić =

Serbian footballer (born 1946)

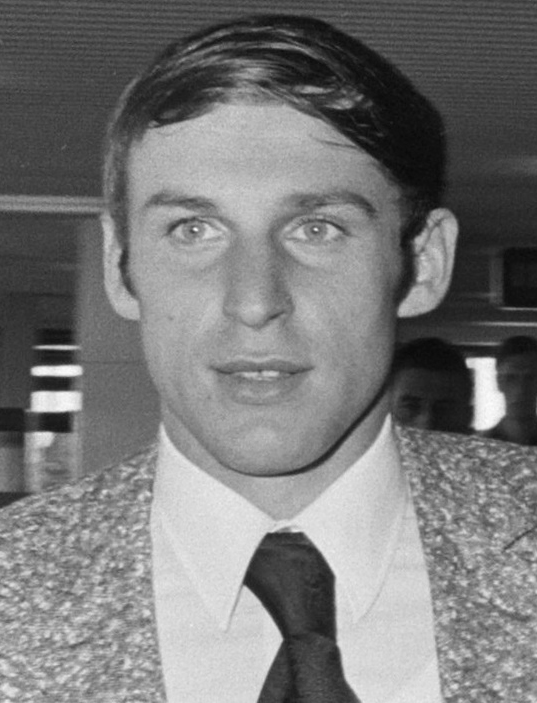
- Džajić in 1970

President of Football Association of Serbia
- Incumbent
- Assumed office 14 March 2023
- Preceded by: Nenad Bjeković (acting)

President of Red Star Belgrade
- In office 19 December 2012 – 19 June 2014
- Preceded by: Vladan Lukić
- Succeeded by: Svetozar Mijailović
- In office 1998–2004
- Preceded by: Svetozar Mijailović
- Succeeded by: Dragan Stojković

Personal details
- Born: Dragan Džajić; 30 May 1946 (age 80) Ub, PR Serbia, FPR Yugoslavia
- Height: 1.78 m (5 ft 10 in)
- Occupation: Footballer; Football administrator
Association football career
- Position: Left winger
Youth career
- 1961–1963: Red Star Belgrade
Senior career*
Years	Team	Apps	(Gls)
1963–1975	Red Star Belgrade	281	(108)
1975–1977	Bastia	56	(31)
1977–1978	Red Star Belgrade	25	(5)
Total		362	(144)
International career
1964–1979	Yugoslavia	85	(23)
Medal record
Men's Football
Representing Yugoslavia
European Championship
Silver medal – second place	1968 Italy	Team
Mediterranean Games
Gold medal – first place	1971 Izmir	Team
- * Club domestic league appearances and goals

Dragan Džajić (Serbian Cyrillic: Драган Џајић; born 30 May 1946) is a Serbian football administrator and former player who is the current president of the Football Association of Serbia from 14 March 2023.

Džajić is widely considered to be one of the best footballers to emerge from the former Yugoslavia, and one of the greatest left wingers of all time. He was known for his crosses, passes, dribbling, natural technique, and his left-footed free kicks.

In November 2003, to celebrate UEFA's Jubilee, Džajić was selected as the Golden Player of Serbia and Montenegro by the Football Association of Serbia and Montenegro as their most outstanding player of the past 50 years.

== Club career ==
Born on 30 May 1946 in the small town of Ub, 60 kilometeres outside Belgrade, Džajić's football career (1961–1978) was spent primarily with Red Star Belgrade. A left winger, his career with the club spanned 590 games and 287 goals by winning five league titles and four Yugoslavian Cups. In 1969, Džajić received the Sport newspaper's Golden Badge award for Yugoslavia's best athlete. He is considered to have been one of the most important players in the history of the club and is one of only five players to have been awarded the Zvezdine zvezde status.

=== Red Star Belgrade ===
==== Early starter ====
Džajić was plucked from the relative obscurity of his local club, FK Jedinstvo, by Red Star Belgrade youth coach Miljan Miljanić, spending two years in the club's youth system.

Though only 17 years and 8 days of age, Džajić was handed his first team debut by head coach Miša Pavić in a Yugoslav First League match against FK Budućnost Titograd on 8 June 1963, which finished 0–0. It was the last week of the 1962–63 league season with FK Partizan already clinching the league championship and Red Star hovering in 7th place, out of European spots. The match was played at Omladinski Stadium at Karaburma because Red Star's famous home Marakana was in the final construction stages.

Džajić started out as a left-back, but it was further up the flank that he made his impact. An expert dribbler, his left foot provided a constant stream of goals for teammate Vojin Lazarević. Džajić was rewarded with championship medals in 1964, 1968, 1969, 1970, and 1973, while he lifted the cup in 1964, 1968, 1970, and 1971.

==== Semi-final defeat ====
European Cup success very nearly came his way too. In the 1970–71 season, Red Star Belgrade reached the semi-finals of the top continental club competition and beat Panathinaikos 4–1 in the first leg in Belgrade. Džajić was suspended for the return in Athens, however, which the Greek team won 3–0 to go through on away goals.

=== Bastia ===
From 1975 to 1977, he played for SC Bastia in France (scoring another 31 times). He is considered to have been one of their most notable players of all time.

== International career ==
Džajić was just 18 when he was first named to the Yugoslavia national team. He made his debut on 17 June 1964 in a 2–1 defeat against Romania at the JNA Stadium in Belgrade. Džajić would go on to earn 85 caps (the most in the history of the Yugoslavia national team) and score 23 goals. He became renowned for his passing, dribbling, and goal-scoring. He played in the 1968 European Championship semi-final against England, in which his 87th-minute lob over the goalkeeper Gordon Banks gave Yugoslavia a 1–0 victory against the then world champions. The British press dubbed him "the magic Dragan". He went on to score in the final against Italy but could not prevent Yugoslavia from losing 2–0 after a replay.

Džajić said about his most well-known international matches (at Euro 1968):

I have nice memories from that championship. It's true that our failure in the final hurts me, but from today's perspective, I can say that we made a great result. Some excellent teams were behind us, but against the home side, we were in a subordinate position due to a 'higher power.' The referee Dienst was the Azzurri's twelfth man and they won only due to his help. In those circumstances, our generation couldn't win the gold medal. It's also too bad that there was no Ilija Petković in the repeated match because our game play would have been much quicker.

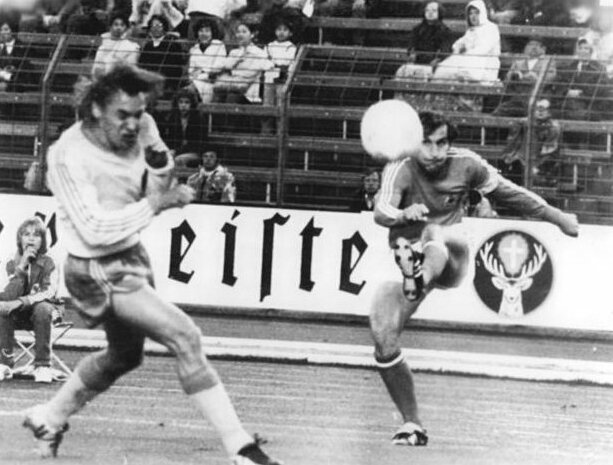
Džajić (right) facing Sweden's Jan Olsson at the 1974 FIFA World Cup

Džajić participated in the 1974 FIFA World Cup, which was held in West Germany. He played in Yugoslavia's opening championship game draw with world champions Brazil and scored one goal in a record victory of 9–0 against Zaire. After passing the second stage of the championship, Yugoslavia didn't repeat the results of their opening games. They lost three games in a row and had to return home.

== Administrative ==
Džajić retired as a player in 1978, at the age of 32. Right away, he began performing a role as Red Star's technical director. In his first season in the new administrative role, the club reached the UEFA Cup final. Džajić became the main decision-maker within the club when it comes to transfer policy.

In 1998, Džajić became the club's president—a position he resigned from in 2004 due to health issues.

=== Corruption allegations and presidential abolition ===
On 31 January 2011, the trial started in which Džajić was charged with fraud perpetrated during the sale of players from Red Star Belgrade during Džajić's time as the president of the club, specifically Nemanja Vidić. Džajić pleaded not guilty. The charges against Nemanja Vidić were dropped. Nemanja Vidić also denied all accusations against Dragan Džajić.

On 16 November 2012, Tomislav Nikolić, the President of Serbia, signed an exemption from criminal liability for all charges. This abolition ended all legal proceedings against Džajić.

=== Return to Red Star and re-election as president in 2012 ===
It was stated by local Serbian newspapers at the beginning of December 2011 that Džajić would return to the administration of Red Star, as it was believed that Džajić was the only one who could get Red Star back on track. However, nothing came of this. Džajić spoke to Blic (tabloid daily newspaper in Serbia) after the board meeting, saying, "I spoke with people from the club, the desire to return was not disputed, I wanted to help, because everything that I previously experienced with the club cannot be forgotten. I followed, listened to and read what happened at the meeting, I wanted to come back but nothing happened and life goes on. I remain available and in this case I can only wish Red Star better days."

On 19 December 2012, Džajić was elected as President of Red Star Belgrade for the second time. He resigned from the position on 19 June 2014. He was then chosen as honorary president of the club

On 14 March 2023, Dzajic was elected president of Football Association of Serbia for a mandate of four years.

== Legacy ==
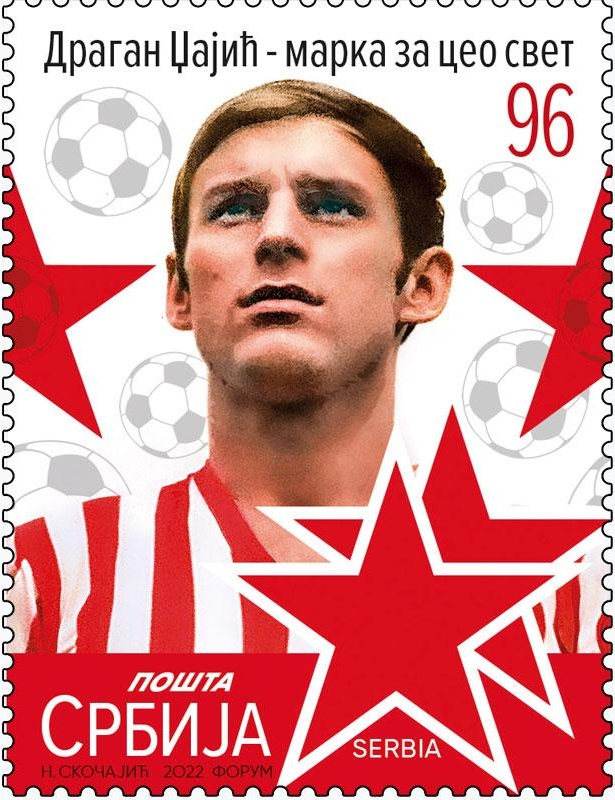
Džajić on a 2022 stamp of Serbia

In November 2011, Džajić was named in "the greatest European Championship XI of all time" by Goal.com.

On 2 December 2022, Red Star Belgrade announced that the number 11 worn by Džajić will be retired from the 2023–24 season on.

== Honours ==
Red Star Belgrade

- Yugoslav First League: 1963–64, 1967–68, 1968–69, 1969–70, 1972–73
- Yugoslav Cup: 1963–64, 1967–68, 1969–70, 1970–71
- Mitropa Cup: 1968

Yugoslavia

- Mediterranean Games: 1971
- UEFA European Championship runner-up: 1968

Individual

- UEFA Euro Top Scorer: 1968
- UEFA Euro Team of the Tournament: 1968, 1976
- Ballon d'Or (3rd place): 1968
- Golden Badge: 1969
- FUWO European Team of the Season: 1968, 1969, 1970, 1972
- ADN Eastern European Footballer of the Season: 1968, 1970
- World Soccer World XI: 1969, 1973
- Best Sportsman of SD Crvena Zvezda: 1966, 1967, 1968, 1969, 1970
- Sport Ideal European XI: 1971, 1972
- YU-Serbian UEFA Golden Player: 2004
- FIFA XI: 1968

Awards
Preceded by Đurđa Bjedov	The Best Athlete of Yugoslavia; 1969	Succeeded by Desanka Pešut
