= Dragan Holcer =

Yugoslav footballer (1945–2015)

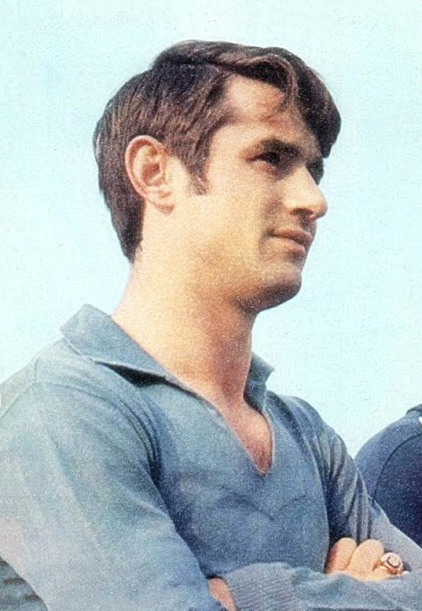

Personal information
- Date of birth: 19 January 1945
- Place of birth: Zwiesel (Berggießhübel), Nazi Germany
- Date of death: 23 September 2015 (aged 70)
- Place of death: Split, Croatia
- Position: Defender

Senior career*
Years	Team	Apps	(Gls)
1963–1967	Radnički Niš	96	(8)
1967–1975	Hajduk Split	215	(0)
1975–1981	VfB Stuttgart	179	(2)
1981–1982	Schalke 04	12	(0)
Total		502	(10)

International career
1965–1974	Yugoslavia	52	(0)
Medal record
Men's Football
Representing Yugoslavia
European Championship
Silver medal – second place	1968 Italy	Team
- * Club domestic league appearances and goals

Dragan Holcer (19 January 1945 – 23 September 2015) was a Yugoslav footballer who played as a defender.

== Early life ==
Holcer was born in captivity in a Nazi prison camp to Slovenian father Franc Holcer and to Austrian-Italian mother Ida Orelli who lived in Niš. His father fought in World War II as part of Yugoslav Partisans. His father was killed in battle while his pregnant mother was rounded up in Slovenia and imprisoned in Nazi Germany along with her three daughters. Shortly after the war ended his mother took the family to her hometown Niš in Serbia where Holcer grew up.

== International career ==
Holcer made his debut for Yugoslavia in a September 1965 World Cup qualification match away against Luxembourg and earned a total of 52 caps, scoring no goals. He was a participant at Euro 1968 and his final international was an April 1974 friendly match against the Soviet Union.

== Death ==
Holcer, who was considered to be a legend of Hajduk Split, died in Split on 23 September 2015, aged 70.
