= Ilija Petković =

Serbian footballer (1945–2020)

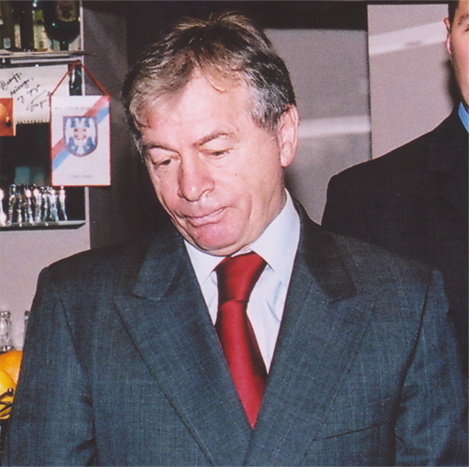
- Petković in 2006

Personal information
- Date of birth: 22 September 1945
- Place of birth: Knin, DF Yugoslavia
- Date of death: 27 June 2020 (aged 74)
- Place of death: Belgrade, Serbia
- Height: 1.70 m (5 ft 7 in)
- Position: Winger

Youth career
- Dinara

Senior career*
Years	Team	Apps	(Gls)
1964–1973	OFK Beograd	212	(37)
1973–1976	Troyes	122	(7)
1976–1983	OFK Beograd	171	(16)

International career
1968–1974	Yugoslavia	43	(6)

Managerial career
- 1988–1989: OFK Beograd
- 1991–1993: OFK Beograd
- 1993–1995: Servette
- 1997–1998: FR Yugoslavia (assistant)
- 1998: Avispa Fukuoka (assistant)
- 1999–2000: Aris Thessaloniki
- 2000–2001: FR Yugoslavia
- 2001: Shanghai Shenhua
- 2002: Sichuan Dahe
- 2003–2006: Serbia and Montenegro
- 2009–2010: Incheon United
- 2010: Al Ahli Doha
- 2013: Gyeongnam
- 2017: Serbia U20
Medal record
Men's football
Representing Yugoslavia
European Championship
Silver medal – second place	1968 Italy
- * Club domestic league appearances and goals

Ilija Petković (Serbian Cyrillic: Илија Петковић, pronounced [ǐlija pětkoʋitɕ]; 22 September 1945 – 27 June 2020) was a Serbian footballer and manager.

Petković was capped 43 times for Yugoslavia, participating in the 1968 European Football Championship, and in the 1974 FIFA World Cup where he scored a goal in a huge 9–0 win against Zaire. He played much of his career in OFK Beograd, with a mid-career stint playing for Troyes.

He began his coaching career in 1990 with his original club, OFK Beograd, and he went on to coach numerous other clubs. Initially starting as an assistant, Petković coached his national team from 2000 to 2001 and from 2003 to 2006 – including most notably the 2006 FIFA World Cup.

== Playing career ==
=== OFK Beograd ===
When Petković left his hometown Knin for the capital city Belgrade, he had not yet decided if he wanted to play football professionally because, in addition to training and playing with OFK Beograd, he simultaneously enrolled in and eventually completed the Economics college.

He signed his first professional contract with OFK in 1964. Though the club was even then in the constant shadow of its big city rivals Red Star Belgrade and Partizan, it still managed to put in many memorable league campaigns as well as to win the 1965–66 Yugoslav Cup with a 6–2 final thrashing of Dinamo Zagreb.

In 1972, Petković played as a guest for Uruguayan side Peñarol where he suffered a fracture caused by Nacional defender Juan Mujica.

=== Troyes ===
According to the strictly enforced sporting rules of communist Yugoslavia, no player was allowed to play for clubs outside the country before reaching the age of 28. Petković was no different and had to wait until 1973 to complete a move to Troyes where he spent three seasons.

=== Return to OFK Beograd ===
His second stint with OFK started in 1976 after returning from France at the age of 31. Even at the twilight of his career Petković managed to be an important contributor to the team. He played until 1983, retiring from the game close to the age of 38. Unfortunately, this time around the team's overall performance wasn't as glowing as was the case during Petković's first stint. They constantly hovered around the relegation zone and couldn't avoid the drop in 1979–80 season meaning that Petković played the 1980–81 campaign in Yugoslav Second League. They quickly gained promotion at the end of that year and played two more seasons in the top flight before being relegated again after 1982–83, Petković's last playing season.

=== International career ===
Petković debuted for Yugoslavia on 24 April 1968, at the age of 22 when Yugoslavia hosted France at Belgrade's Partizan Stadium in the second leg of the qualifying round quarter-final. The score from the first leg eighteen days earlier in Marseille was 1–1 and qualification was at stake but Petković scored his first goal in the national team just three minutes in, before adding another one in the 33rd minute as Yugoslavia won 5–1.

He went on to play for Yugoslavia at the final tournament in Italy. He also played at the 1974 FIFA World Cup in West Germany, scoring a goal in the group stage 9–0 victory over Zaire. He played his final international there, against Poland.

== Coaching career ==
=== FR Yugoslavia ===
Petković was named as an assistant to Slobodan Santrač in 1997, prior to the 1998 FIFA World Cup. FR Yugoslavia exited the tournament in the Round of 16 to the Netherlands which was labelled a disappointing result, leading Santrač and the entire coaching staff (including Petković) to resign after the tournament.

In July 2000, Petković became the head coach of FR Yugoslavia after their exiting from UEFA Euro 2000 in the quarter-final to the Netherlands by a score of 6–1 and the subsequent dismissal of head coach Vujadin Boškov.

Petković started off well with a 2–1 away win in a friendly against Northern Ireland and a 2–0 win against Luxembourg in a 2002 FIFA World Cup qualifier.

As the Football Association was getting ready to choose a new president in January 2001, Petković resigned from his post citing the departure of outgoing FA president Miljan Miljanić as the reason.

=== Serbia and Montenegro ===
In July 2003, Petković was named as the head coach of the Serbia and Montenegro national team by FA president Dragan Stojković.

Petković managed to lead the team through 2006 World Cup qualifying in impressive fashion, with Serbia and Montenegro allowing only one goal in twelve matches. However, the team's showing at the World Cup final tournament in Germany was disastrous, with three losses from three matches including a 0–6 defeat at the hands of Argentina. Furthermore, Petković caused controversy ahead of the tournament when he named his son Dušan in the final squad as a replacement for the injured Mirko Vučinić, a move that triggered widespread outrage and condemnation. Dragan Stojković (at this time the president of Red Star Belgrade) criticized Petković publicly. Faced with the barrage of criticism, Petković's son withdrew from the squad which meant that, since the squad list was already submitted, FIFA did not allow a replacement to be named so Serbia and Montenegro ended up being the only nation at the World Cup with 22 players in the squad instead of 23.

In late December 2009, Petković accused Stojković of starting the media smear campaign against him back in late May 2006 before the World Cup. Petković claimed that he refused to name some Red Star players in the final squad that the club was looking to sell at a better price by having them showcased at the World Cup, all of which prompted Stojković's ire, with Stojković denying the claims.

== Death ==
Petković died on 27 June 2020, in Belgrade after being hospitalized with a duodenal ulcer and becoming infected with COVID-19 amid the COVID-19 pandemic in Serbia. He is interred in the Alley of Distinguished Citizens in the Belgrade New Cemetery.

== Honours ==
=== Player ===
OFK Beograd

- Yugoslav Cup: 1965–66

=== Manager ===
Servette

- Swiss National League A: 1993–94

Individual

- Serbian Coach of the Year: 2005
