= Miroslav Pavlović =

Serbian footballer

Personal information
- Date of birth: 23 October 1942
- Place of birth: Požega, German-occupied Serbia
- Date of death: 19 January 2004 (aged 61)
- Place of death: Belgrade, Serbia and Montenegro
- Position: Defender

Senior career*
Years	Team	Apps	(Gls)
1959–1962	Sloga Užička Požega		
1963–1966	Sloboda Titovo Užice		
1967–1974	Red Star Belgrade	201	(3)
1974–1976	Diest	43	(1)
1976–1977	San Jose Earthquakes	50	(1)
1980	San Jose Earthquakes	19	(4)

International career
1968–1974	Yugoslavia	46	(2)

Managerial career
- 1996: Čukarički
Medal record
Men's Football
Representing Yugoslavia
European Championship
Silver medal – second place	1968 Italy	Team
- * Club domestic league appearances and goals

Miroslav Pavlović (Serbian Cyrillic: Мирослав Павловић; 23 October 1942 – 19 January 2004) was a Serbian footballer. He was nicknamed Pavika in Serbia, and while playing in the United States, he was known as Miro Pavlovic.

== Club career ==
He played domestically for Sloga Užička Požega, Sloboda Titovo Užice and Red Star Belgrade, in Belgium for KFC Diest, and in the United States for the San Jose Earthquakes. He played 400 matches for Red Star in all competitions and friendlies and won 4 league titles, 3 domestic cups and the 1968 Mitropa Cup with them.

== International career ==
On the national level he played for Yugoslavia national team (46 matches/two goals), and was a participant at Euro 1968 and at the 1974 FIFA World Cup. His final international was against Sweden at that latter tournament.

It is clear he has an unknown amount of children and grandchildren.
