= UEFA Euro 1968 =

European football competition

1968 UEFA European Football Championship
Campionato europeo di calcio Italia 1968

Tournament details
- Host country: Italy
- Dates: 5–10 June
- Teams: 4
- Venues: 3 (in 3 host cities)

Final positions
- Champions: Italy (1st title)
- Runners-up: Yugoslavia
- Third place: England
- Fourth place: Soviet Union

Tournament statistics
- Matches played: 5
- Goals scored: 7 (1.4 per match)
- Attendance: 260,916 (52,183 per match)
- Top scorer: (Socialist Federal Republic of Yugoslavia) Dragan Džajić (2 goals)
- Best player: (Italy) Dino Zoff

The 1968 UEFA European Football Championship final tournament was hosted and won by Italy. This was the third UEFA European Championship, an event held every four years and organised by UEFA. The final tournament took place between 5 and 10 June 1968.

It was in this year that the tournament changed its name from the "European Nations' Cup" to the "European Championship". There were also some changes in the tournament's qualifying structure, with the two-legged home-and-away knock-out stage being replaced by a group phase.

Four countries played in the final tournament, which consisted of the semi-finals, a third place play-off, and the final. The host nation for the finals was selected from the four qualified nations.

== Qualification ==
The qualification competition was played in two stages: a group stage (taking place from 1966 until 1968) and the quarter-finals (played in 1968). There were seven groups of four teams and one of three, with matches played in a home-and-away basis. The eight group winners qualified for the quarter-finals, which were played in two legs, home and away. The winners of the quarter-finals went through to the final tournament.

This tournament remains, to this day, the only World Cup or European Championship in which a West German or unified German team was eliminated in the qualifying stages. (Germany did not enter the 1930 FIFA World Cup; West Germany was barred from the 1950 World Cup and, for unknown reasons, did not enter the qualifying stages of UEFA Euro 1960 or 1964.)

=== Qualified teams ===
Team	Qualified as	Qualified on	Previous appearances in tournament (Note: Bold indicates champion for that year.)
Italy (host)	Quarter-final winner	20 April 1968	0 (debut)
Yugoslavia	Quarter-final winner	24 April 1968	1 (1960)
England	Quarter-final winner	8 May 1968	0 (debut)
Soviet Union	Quarter-final winner	11 May 1968	2 (**1960**, 1964)

== Venues ==
UEFA Euro 1968 is located in Italy	Rome	Naples	Florence
UEFA Euro 1968 is located in Italy	Stadio Olimpico	Stadio San Paolo	Stadio Comunale
UEFA Euro 1968 is located in Italy	Capacity: 80,000	Capacity: 82,000	Capacity: 52,000

== Match officials ==
Country	Referee
Switzerland	Gottfried Dienst
Spain	José María Ortiz de Mendíbil
(West Germany) West Germany	Kurt Tschenscher
Hungary	István Zsolt

== Final tournament ==
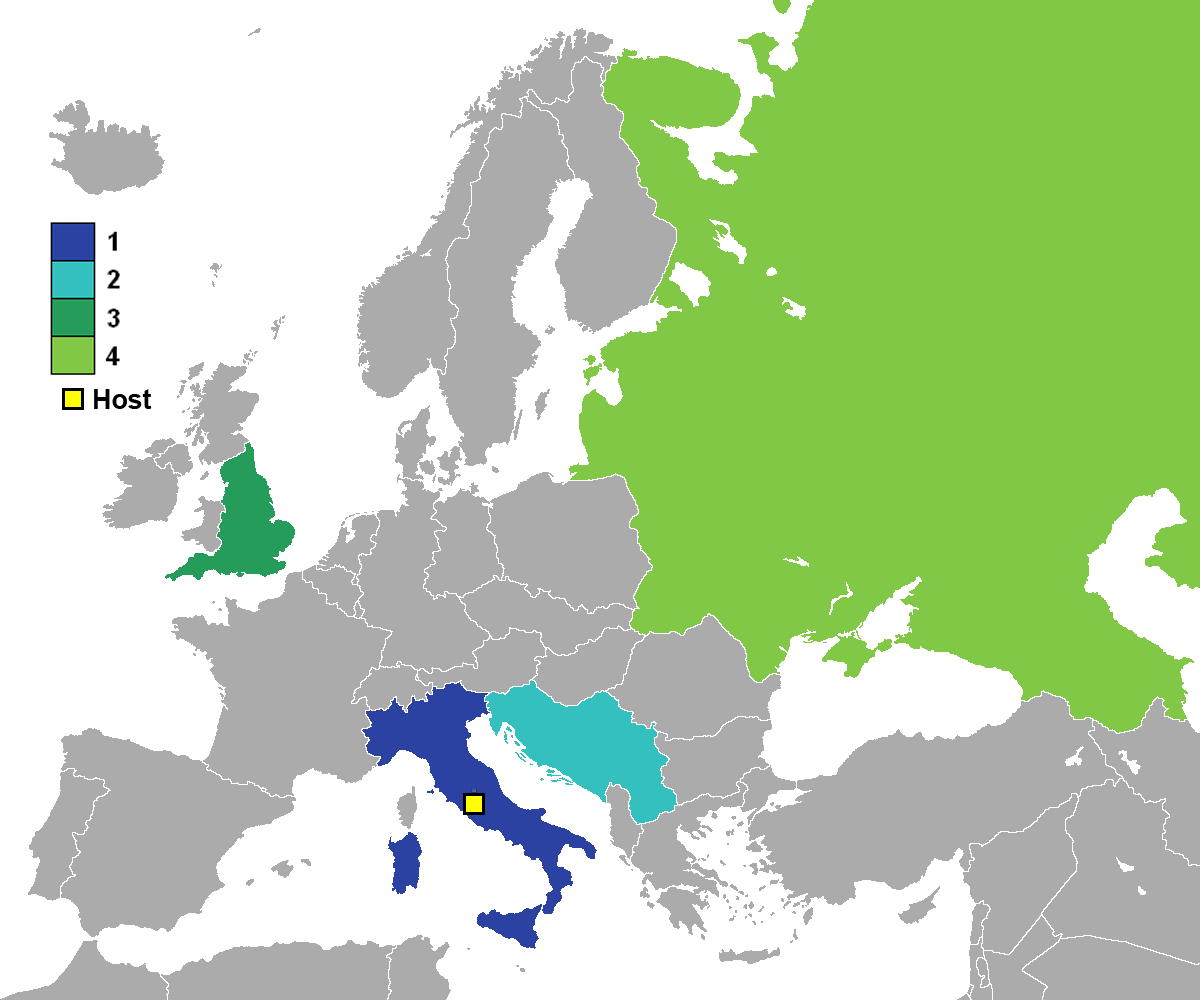
1968 UEFA European Football Championship finalists

In all matches but the final, extra time and a coin toss were used to decide the winner if necessary. If the final remained level after extra time, a replay would be used to determine the winner. A coin toss was used in the semi-final between Italy and the Soviet Union.

All times are local, CEST (UTC+2).

=== Bracket ===
Semi-finals
5 June – Naples
Italy (coin toss)	0
Soviet Union	0
5 June – Florence
Yugoslavia	1
England	0

Final
8 and 10 June – Rome
Italy (replay)	1	2
Yugoslavia	1	0
Third place play-off
8 June – Rome
England	2
Soviet Union	0

=== Semi-finals ===
5 June 1968
18:00

Italy	0–0 (a.e.t.) Italy won on coin toss	Soviet Union
	Report

Stadio San Paolo, Naples
Attendance: 68,582
Referee: Kurt Tschenscher (West Germany)

5 June 1968
21:15

Yugoslavia	1–0	England
Džajić 86'	Report

Stadio Comunale, Florence
Attendance: 21,834
Referee: José María Ortiz de Mendíbil (Spain)

=== Third place play-off ===
8 June 1968
18:45

England	2–0	Soviet Union
B. Charlton 39'; Hurst 63'	Report

Stadio Olimpico, Rome
Attendance: 68,817
Referee: István Zsolt (Hungary)

=== Final ===
8 June 1968
21:15

Italy	1–1 (a.e.t.)	Yugoslavia
Domenghini 80'	Report	Džajić 39'

Stadio Olimpico, Rome
Attendance: 68,817
Referee: Gottfried Dienst (Switzerland)

10 June 1968
21:15

Italy	2–0	Yugoslavia
Riva 12'; Anastasi 31'	Report

Stadio Olimpico, Rome
Attendance: 32,886
Referee: José María Ortiz de Mendíbil (Spain)

== Statistics ==
=== Goalscorers ===
There were 7 goals scored in 5 matches, for an average of 1.4 goals per match.

2 goals

- (Socialist Federal Republic of Yugoslavia) Dragan Džajić

1 goal

- (England) Bobby Charlton
- (England) Geoff Hurst
- (Italy) Pietro Anastasi
- (Italy) Angelo Domenghini
- (Italy) Gigi Riva

=== Awards ===
UEFA Team of the Tournament

Goalkeeper	Defenders	Midfielders	Forwards
(Italy) Dino Zoff	(England) Bobby Moore (Italy) Giacinto Facchetti (Soviet Union) Albert Shesternyov (Socialist Federal Republic of Yugoslavia) Mirsad Fazlagić	(Italy) Angelo Domenghini (Italy) Sandro Mazzola (Socialist Federal Republic of Yugoslavia) Ivica Osim	(England) Geoff Hurst (Italy) Gigi Riva (Socialist Federal Republic of Yugoslavia) Dragan Džajić
