= 1960 European Nations' Cup qualifying =

Tournament details
- Dates: 28 September 1958 – 29 May 1960
- Teams: 17

Tournament statistics
- Matches played: 24
- Goals scored: 91 (3.79 per match)
- Top scorer(s): (Czechoslovakia) Titus Buberník (France) Just Fontaine (5 goals each)

This article describes the qualifying procedure for the 1960 European Nations' Cup, the inaugural edition of the European Nations' Cup tournament, now known as the UEFA European Championship.

== Qualified teams ==
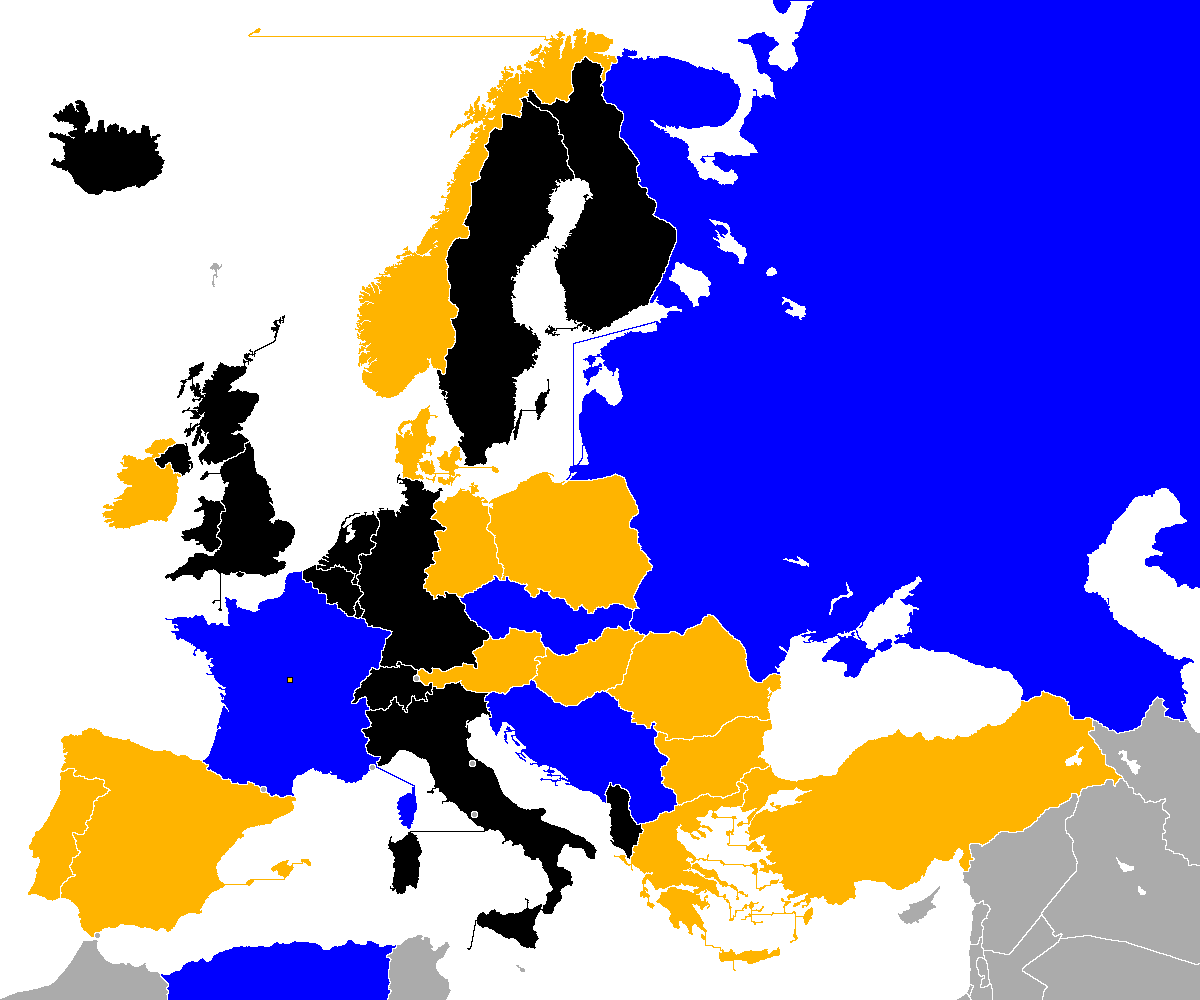
Qualified Did not qualify Did not enter Not a UEFA member

Team	Qualified as	Qualified on
France (host)	Quarter-finals winner	27 March 1960
Yugoslavia	Quarter-finals winner	22 May 1960
Soviet Union	Quarter-finals winner (Note: Won by walkover after the withdrawal of Spain.)	28 May 1960
Czechoslovakia	Quarter-finals winner	29 May 1960

== Format ==
The qualification was a knockout tournament where the teams would play a two-legged tie on a home-and-away basis. If the aggregate scores were level at the end of the tie, a third leg was played at a neutral venue to decide the winners. It consisted of a preliminary round, a round of 16, and a quarter-final round. The four quarter-final winners would qualify for the tournament proper; one of those four countries would then be chosen to host it.

17 teams entered the competition; notable absences included West Germany, Italy, World Cup finalists Sweden, and the four Home Nations. Two of the entrants, Czechoslovakia and the Republic of Ireland, were selected to play the preliminary round. The winner of that fixture would join the remaining 15 teams in the round of 16.

In fact, a few matches of the round of 16 took place before the preliminary round matches. The first European Nations' Cup qualifying match was played on 28 September 1958 between the Soviet Union and Hungary. The first goal was scored by Anatoli Ilyin of the Soviet Union four minutes into that game. On 3 December 1958, Greece became the first team to be eliminated from the European Nations' Cup after losing 8–2 on aggregate to France.

== Preliminary round ==
Czechoslovakia and the Republic of Ireland were randomly selected to face each other in the preliminary round. The other 15 countries received byes to the round of 16.

Team 1	Agg.	Team 2	1st leg	2nd leg
Republic of Ireland	2–4	Czechoslovakia	2–0	0–4

== Round of 16 ==
Team 1	Agg.	Team 2	1st leg	2nd leg
Soviet Union	4–1	Hungary	3–1	1–0
France	8–2	Greece	7–1	1–1
Romania	3–2	Turkey	3–0	0–2
Norway	2–6	Austria	0–1	2–5
Yugoslavia	3–1	Bulgaria	2–0	1–1
East Germany	2–5	Portugal	0–2	2–3
Poland	2–7	Spain	2–4	0–3
Denmark	3–7	Czechoslovakia	2–2	1–5

== Quarter-finals ==
Team 1	Agg.	Team 2	1st leg	2nd leg
France	9–4	Austria	5–2	4–2
Portugal	3–6	Yugoslavia	2–1	1–5
Romania	0–5	Czechoslovakia	0–2	0–3
Soviet Union	w/o (Note: Spain refused to travel to the Soviet Union for their quarter-final, so Spain were disqualified and the Soviet Union were awarded a walkover victory.)	Spain	Canc.	Canc.

== Goalscorers ==
There were 91 goals scored in 24 matches, for an average of 3.79 goals per match.

5 goals

- (Czechoslovakia) Titus Buberník
- (France) Just Fontaine

4 goals

- (France) Jean Vincent

3 goals

- (Austria) Erich Hof
- (Austria) Horst Nemec
- (Czechoslovakia) Milan Dolinský
- (Portugal) Mário Coluna
- (Spain) Alfredo Di Stéfano
- (Socialist Federal Republic of Yugoslavia) Bora Kostić

2 goals

- (Czechoslovakia) Vlastimil Bubník
- (Czechoslovakia) Adolf Scherer
- (France) Thadée Cisowski
- (France) Raymond Kopa
- (Norway) Ove Ødegaard
- (Portugal) Domiciano Cavém
- (Portugal) Matateu
- (Spain) Luis Suárez
- (Turkey) Lefter Küçükandonyadis
- (Socialist Federal Republic of Yugoslavia) Milan Galić

1 goal

- (Austria) Walter Horak
- (Austria) Rudolf Pichler
- (Austria) Erich Probst
- (Austria) Karl Skerlan
- (Bulgaria) Todor Diev
- (Czechoslovakia) Ladislav Kačáni
- (Czechoslovakia) Josef Masopust
- (Czechoslovakia) Ladislav Pavlovič
- (Czechoslovakia) Imrich Stacho
- (Denmark) Bent Hansen
- (Denmark) John Kramer
- (Denmark) Poul Pedersen
- (East Germany) Horst Kohle
- (East Germany) Gerhard Vogt
- (France) Stéphane Bruey
- (France) François Heutte
- (France) Jean-Jacques Marcel
- (France) Bernard Rahis
- (Greece) Elias Yfantis
- (Hungary) János Göröcs
- (Poland) Lucjan Brychczy
- (Poland) Ernest Pohl
- (Portugal) Santana
- (Republic of Ireland) Noel Cantwell
- (Republic of Ireland) Liam Tuohy
- (Romania) Gheorghe Constantin
- (Romania) Constantin Dinulescu
- (Romania) Nicolae Oaidă
- (Soviet Union) Anatoli Ilyin
- (Soviet Union) Valentin Ivanov
- (Soviet Union) Slava Metreveli
- (Soviet Union) Yuriy Voynov
- (Spain) Enric Gensana
- (Spain) Francisco Gento
- (Socialist Federal Republic of Yugoslavia) Zvezdan Čebinac
- (Socialist Federal Republic of Yugoslavia) Muhamed Mujić
- (Socialist Federal Republic of Yugoslavia) Dragoslav Šekularac
- (Socialist Federal Republic of Yugoslavia) Lazar Tasić

1 own goal

- (France) Roger Marche (against Greece)
