= 1959–60 European Cup =

European football tournament

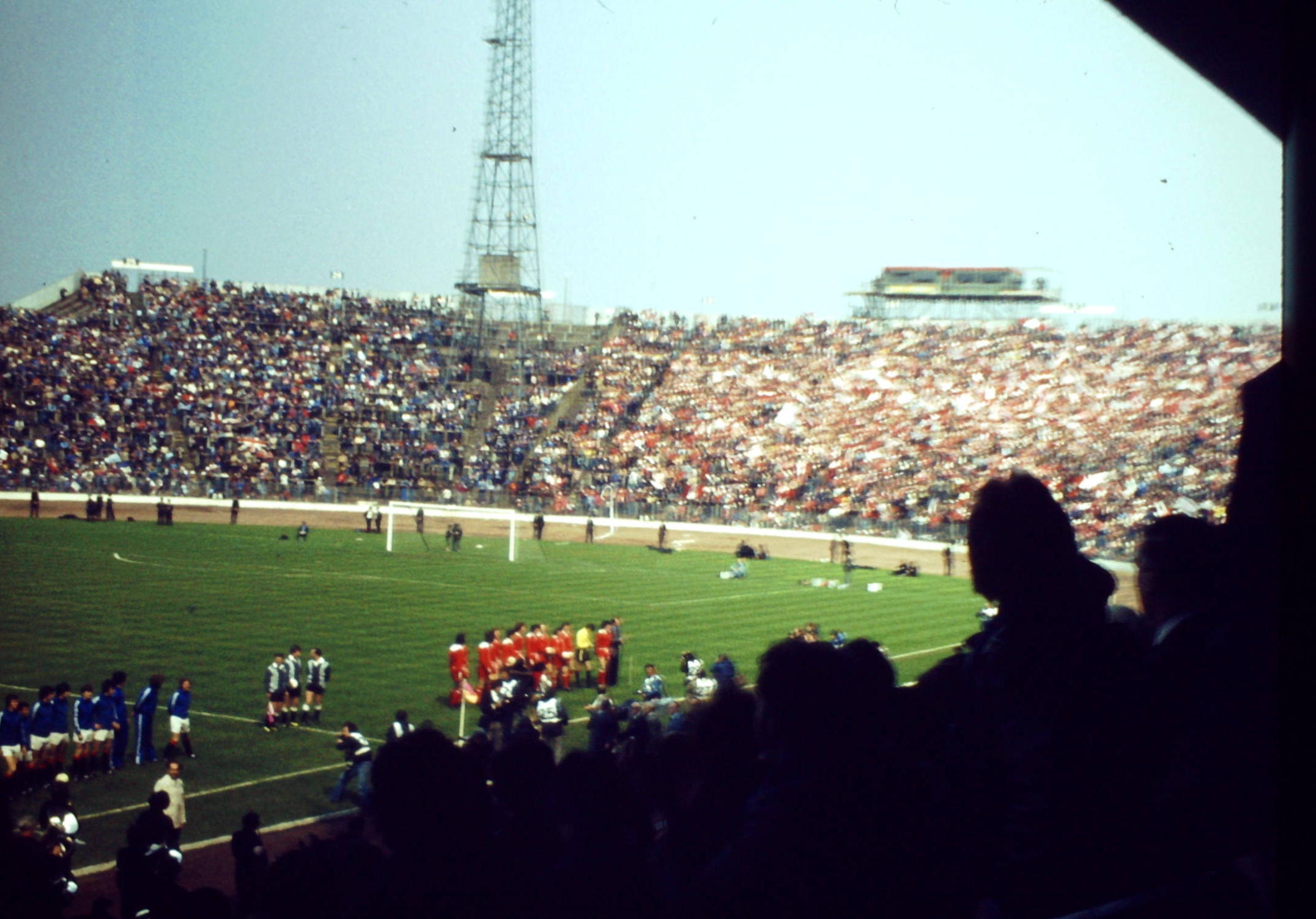
- Hampden Park in Glasgow hosted the final.

Tournament details
- Dates: 26 August 1959 – 18 May 1960
- Teams: 27 (26 competed) (from 25 associations)

Final positions
- Champions: (Spain) Real Madrid (5th title)
- Runners-up: (West Germany) Eintracht Frankfurt

Tournament statistics
- Matches played: 52
- Goals scored: 218 (4.19 per match)
- Attendance: 2,355,478 (45,298 per match)
- Top scorer(s): Ferenc Puskás (Real Madrid); 12 goals

The 1959–60 European Cup was the fifth season of the European Cup, Europe's premier club football tournament. The competition was won by Real Madrid, who beat Eintracht Frankfurt 7–3 in the final at Hampden Park, Glasgow, on 18 May 1960, thanks to first ever hat-tricks scored in the final of the competition by Ferenc Puskás and Alfredo Di Stéfano. It remains the record score and record attendance for the European Cup final. It was Real Madrid's fifth consecutive title, which is a feat that no other club has matched.

It was also the first time that a German team, Eintracht Frankfurt, reached the final. They were debutants in the competition and it wasn't until 1983–84 European Cup and AS Roma that another debutants ended up on the losing side in the final.

The tournament saw the first participation by a Greek club, Greek Champions Olympiacos, who had withdrawn from the previous season after being already placed in the bracket. It meant that no new country entered the competition for the first time since tournament inception.

== Teams ==
A total of 27 teams were placed in the competition bracket, but finally only 26 participated since Kuopion Palloseura had withdrawn before playing first game.

Spain continued to be represented by two clubs, with Real Madrid qualifying as title holders and Barcelona as Spanish champions. CDNA Sofia appeared in the fourth edition of European Cup, with only Real Madrid having more appearances in the competition.

Červená Hviezda Bratislava, Boldklubben 1909, Kuopion Palloseura, Vorwärts Berlin, Eintracht Frankfurt, Csepel, Sparta Rotterdam, Linfield, ŁKS Łódź, Barcelona and Fenerbahçe made their debut in the competition.

All entrants were their respective associations champions, except for Real Madrid and ŁKS Łódź, the latter being 1958 champion and trailing by two points in spring of 1959.

| (Austria) Wiener Sport-Club (1st) | (Belgium) Anderlecht (1st) | (Bulgaria) CDNA Sofia (1st) | (Czechoslovakia) Červená Hviezda Bratislava (1st) |
| (Denmark) Boldklubben 1909 (1st) | (East Germany) Vorwärts Berlin (1st) | (England) Wolverhampton Wanderers (1st) | (Finland) Kuopion Palloseura (1st) |
| (France) Nice (1st) | (Greece) Olympiacos (1st) | (Hungary) Csepel (1st) | (Italy) Milan (1st) |
| (Luxembourg) Jeunesse Esch (1st) | (Netherlands) Sparta Rotterdam (1st) | (Northern Ireland) Linfield (1st) | (Poland) ŁKS Łódź (8th) |
| (Portugal) Porto (1st) | (Republic of Ireland) Shamrock Rovers (1st) | (Romania) Petrolul Ploiești (1st) | (Scotland) Rangers (1st) |
| (Spain) Barcelona (1st) | (Spain) Real Madrid (2nd)^{TH} | (Sweden) IFK Göteborg (1st) | (Switzerland) Young Boys (1st) |
| (Turkey) Fenerbahçe (1st) | (West Germany) Eintracht Frankfurt (1st) | (Socialist Federal Republic of Yugoslavia) Red Star Belgrade (1st) | |

== Preliminary round ==
Location of teams in the 1959–60 European Cup

The draw for the preliminary round took place in Cernobbio, Como, Italy, on 6 July 1959. As title holders, Real Madrid received a bye, and the remaining 26 teams were grouped geographically into two pots. The first two teams drawn in each pot also received byes, while the remaining clubs would play the preliminary round in August, September and October.

| | Pot 1 Northern Europe | Pot 2 Southern Europe |
|---|---|---|
| Drawn | France; Republic of Ireland; Northern Ireland; Belgium; Luxembourg; West Germany; East Germany; Poland; Scotland; England; Finland; Sweden | Austria; Romania; Bulgaria; Turkey; Czechoslovakia; Hungary; Greece; Italy; Portugal; Spain |
| Byes | (Netherlands) Sparta Rotterdam | (Switzerland) Young Boys |
| Byes | (Denmark) Boldklubben 1909 | (Socialist Federal Republic of Yugoslavia) Red Star Belgrade |

The calendar was decided by the involved teams, with all matches to be played by 30 September.

| Team 1 | Agg. | Team 2 | 1st leg | 2nd leg |
|---|---|---|---|---|
| Nice (France) | 4–3 | (Republic of Ireland) Shamrock Rovers | 3–2 | 1–1 |
| Eintracht Frankfurt (West Germany) | (w/o) (Note: Kuopion Palloseura withdrew after the draw, Eintracht Frankfurt advanced to the next round.) | (Finland) Kuopion Palloseura | – | – |
| CDNA Sofia (Bulgaria) | 4–8 | (Spain) Barcelona | 2–2 | 2–6 |
| Wiener Sport-Club (Austria) | 2–1 | (Romania) Petrolul Ploiești | 0–0 | 2–1 |
| Linfield (Northern Ireland) | 3–7 | (Sweden) IFK Göteborg | 2–1 | 1–6 |
| Jeunesse Esch (Luxembourg) | 6–2 | (Poland) ŁKS Łódź | 5–0 | 1–2 |
| Červená Hviezda Bratislava (Czechoslovakia) | 4–1 | (Portugal) Porto | 2–1 | 2–0 |
| Olympiacos (Greece) | 3–5 | (Italy) Milan | 2–2 | 1–3 |
| Fenerbahçe (Turkey) | 4–3 | (Hungary) Csepel | 1–1 | 3–2 |
| Rangers (Scotland) | 7–2 | (Belgium) Anderlecht | 5–2 | 2–0 |
| Vorwärts Berlin (East Germany) | 2–3 | (England) Wolverhampton Wanderers | 2–1 | 0–2 |

=== First leg ===
26 August 1959
16:30 CET

| Nice (France) | 3–2 | (Republic of Ireland) Shamrock Rovers |
|---|---|---|
| Nurenberg 27' (pen.); Foix 30', 74' | Report | Hamilton 19'; Tuohy 87' |

Stade du Ray, Nice
Attendance: 13,369
Referee: Johan Heinrich Martens (Netherlands)

3 September 1959
19:00 CET

| CDNA Sofia (Bulgaria) | 2–2 | (Spain) Barcelona |
|---|---|---|
| Rakarov 16'; Kolev 80' | Report | Segarra 30'; Martínez 61' |

Vasil Levski National Stadium, Sofia
Attendance: 55,000
Referee: John Clough (England)

9 September 1959
20:15 CET

| Wiener Sport-Club (Austria) | 0–0 | (Romania) Petrolul Ploiești |
|---|---|---|
| | Report |

Praterstadion, Vienna
Attendance: 50,000
Referee: Concetto Lo Bello (Italy)

9 September 1959
21:00 CET

| Jeunesse Esch (Luxembourg) | 5–0 | (Poland) ŁKS Łódź |
|---|---|---|
| Theis 6'; May 24'; Schaack 55'; Meurisse 80', 85' | Report |

Stade de la Frontière, Esch-sur-Alzette
Attendance: 5,000
Referee: Kurt Tschenscher (West Germany)

9 September 1959
22:00 CET

| Linfield (Northern Ireland) | 2–1 | (Sweden) IFK Göteborg |
|---|---|---|
| Milburn 23', 30' | Report | Johansson 38' |

Windsor Park, Belfast
Attendance: 40,000
Referee: Johannes Malka (West Germany)

10 September 1959
21:00 CET

| Červená Hviezda Bratislava (Czechoslovakia) | 2–1 | (Portugal) Porto |
|---|---|---|
| Gajdoš 25'; Scherer 77' | Report | Teixeira 32' |

Tehelné pole, Bratislava
Attendance: 35,000
Referee: Marcel Bois (France)

13 September 1959
16:00 CET

| Fenerbahçe (Turkey) | 1–1 | (Hungary) Csepel |
|---|---|---|
| Bartu 73' | Report | Kisuczky 1' |

Mithatpaşa Stadyumu, Istanbul
Attendance: 26,432
Referee: Leo Lemešić (Yugoslavia)

13 September 1959
20:00 CET

| Olympiacos (Greece) | 2–2 | (Italy) Milan |
|---|---|---|
| Papazoglou 20'; Yfantis 44' | Report | Altafini 33', 72' |

Neo Phaliron Velodrome, Athens
Attendance: 20,954
Referee: Fritz Seipelt (Austria)

16 September 1959
21:30 CET

| Rangers (Scotland) | 5–2 | (Belgium) Anderlecht |
|---|---|---|
| Millar 1'; Scott 2'; Matthew 48'; Baird 65', 73' (pen.) | Report | Stockman 52'; De Wael 64' |

Ibrox Park, Glasgow
Attendance: 69,423
Referee: Leo Helge (Denmark)

30 September 1959
21:00 CET

| Vorwärts Berlin (East Germany) | 2–1 | (England) Wolverhampton Wanderers |
|---|---|---|
| Nöldner 24'; Kohle 29' | Report | Broadbent 15' |

Walter-Ulbricht-Stadion, East Berlin
Attendance: 65,000
Referee: Lucien Van Nuffel (Belgium)

=== Second leg ===
16 September 1959
16:30 CET

| Petrolul Ploiești (Romania) | 1–2 | (Austria) Wiener Sport-Club |
|---|---|---|
| Bădulescu 55' | Report | Horak 23', 28' |

Stadionul Petrolul, Ploiești
Attendance: 20,000
Referee: Pietro Bonetto (Italy)

Wiener Sport-Club won 2–1 on aggregate.

23 September 1959
16:45 CET

| Csepel (Hungary) | 2–3 | (Turkey) Fenerbahçe |
|---|---|---|
| Ughy 10'; Németh 34' | Report | Küçükandonyadis 22'; Has 47'; Kalkavan 53' |

Népstadion, Budapest
Attendance: 45,000
Referee: Zivko Bajić (Yugoslavia)

Fenerbahçe won 4–3 on aggregate.

23 September 1959
19:45 CET

| Shamrock Rovers (Republic of Ireland) | 1–1 | (France) Nice |
|---|---|---|
| Hennessy 16' | Report | Faivre 32' |

Dalymount Park, Dublin
Attendance: 35,000
Referee: Willem Beltman (Netherlands)

Nice won 4–3 on aggregate.

23 September 1959
21:00 CET

| IFK Göteborg (Sweden) | 6–1 | (Northern Ireland) Linfield |
|---|---|---|
| Ohlsson 17', 18', 50', 62', 80'; Johansson 48' | Report | Dickson 19' |

Nya Ullevi, Gothenburg
Attendance: 10,475
Referee: Erich Asmussen (West Germany)

IFK Göteborg won 7–3 on aggregate.

23 September 1959
21:00 CET

| ŁKS Łódź (Poland) | 2–1 | (Luxembourg) Jeunesse Esch |
|---|---|---|
| Szymborski 61' (pen.), 85' | Report | Jann 42' |

Stadion ŁKS, Łódź
Attendance: 25,000
Referee: Gösta Ackerborn (Sweden)

Jeunesse Esch won 6–2 on aggregate.

23 September 1959
21:00 CET

| Milan (Italy) | 3–1 | (Greece) Olympiacos |
|---|---|---|
| Danova 12', 26', 85' | Report | Psihos 68' |

San Siro, Milan
Attendance: 19,894
Referee: Erich Steiner (Austria)

Milan won 5–3 on aggregate.

23 September 1959
21:00 CET

| Anderlecht (Belgium) | 0–2 | (Scotland) Rangers |
|---|---|---|
| | Report | Matthew 67'; McMillan 72' |

Stade Émile Versé, Brussels
Attendance: 27,076
Referee: Aage Poulsen (Denmark)

Rangers won 7–2 on aggregate.

23 September 1959
23:30 CET

| Barcelona (Spain) | 6–2 | (Bulgaria) CDNA Sofia |
|---|---|---|
| Kubala 6', 11' (pen.), 45' (pen.); Evaristo 39', 68', 78' | Report | Milanov 24'; Martinov 57' |

Camp Nou, Barcelona
Attendance: 80,000
Referee: Arthur Edward Ellis (England)

Barcelona won 8–4 on aggregate.

29 September 1959
22:00 CET

| Porto (Portugal) | 0–2 | (Czechoslovakia) Červená Hviezda Bratislava |
|---|---|---|
| | Report | Kačáni 65'; Dolinský 80' |

Estádio das Antas, Porto
Attendance: 60,000
Referee: Marcel Lequesne (France)

Červená Hviezda Bratislava won 4–1 on aggregate.

7 October 1959
21:00 CET

| Wolverhampton Wanderers (England) | 2–0 | (East Germany) Vorwärts Berlin |
|---|---|---|
| Mason 60'; Broadbent 75' | Report |

Molineux, Wolverhampton
Attendance: 55,547
Referee: Gérard Versyp (Belgium)

Wolverhampton Wanderers won 3–2 on aggregate.

== Bracket ==
First round
(Switzerland) Young Boys | 1 | 1 | 2
(West Germany) Eintracht Frankfurt | 4 | 1 | 5
(Denmark) Boldklubben 1909 | 0 | 2 | 2
(Austria) Wiener Sport-Club | 3 | 2 | 5
(Netherlands) Sparta Rotterdam | 3 | 1 | 4 (3)
(Sweden) IFK Göteborg | 1 | 3 | 4 (1)
(Scotland) Rangers | 4 | 1 | 5
(Czechoslovakia) Červená Hviezda Bratislava | 3 | 1 | 4
(Turkey) Fenerbahçe | 2 | 1 | 3 (1)
(France) Nice | 1 | 2 | 3 (5)
(Spain) Real Madrid | 7 | 5 | 12
(Luxembourg) Jeunesse Esch | 0 | 2 | 2
(Italy) Milan | 0 | 1 | 1
(Spain) Barcelona | 2 | 5 | 7
(Socialist Federal Republic of Yugoslavia) Red Star Belgrade | 1 | 0 | 1
(England) Wolverhampton Wanderers | 1 | 3 | 4

Quarter-finals
(West Germany) Eintracht Frankfurt | 2 | 1 | 3
(Austria) Wiener Sport-Club | 1 | 1 | 2
(Netherlands) Sparta Rotterdam | 2 | 1 | 3 (2)
(Scotland) Rangers | 3 | 0 | 3 (3)
(France) Nice | 3 | 0 | 3
(Spain) Real Madrid | 2 | 4 | 6
(Spain) Barcelona | 4 | 5 | 9
(England) Wolverhampton Wanderers | 0 | 2 | 2

Semi-finals
(West Germany) Eintracht Frankfurt | 6 | 6 | 12
(Scotland) Rangers | 1 | 3 | 4
(Spain) Real Madrid | 3 | 3 | 6
(Spain) Barcelona | 1 | 1 | 2

Final
(West Germany) Eintracht Frankfurt | 3
(Spain) Real Madrid | 7

== First round ==
| Team 1 | Agg. | Team 2 | 1st leg | 2nd leg | Play-off |
|---|---|---|---|---|---|
| Real Madrid (Spain) | 12–2 | (Luxembourg) Jeunesse Esch | 7–0 | 5–2 | |
| Boldklubben 1909 (Denmark) | 2–5 | (Austria) Wiener Sport-Club | 0–3 | 2–2 | |
| Sparta Rotterdam (Netherlands) | 4–4 | (Sweden) IFK Göteborg | 3–1 | 1–3 | 3–1 |
| Milan (Italy) | 1–7 | (Spain) Barcelona | 0–2 | 1–5 | |
| Young Boys (Switzerland) | 2–5 | (West Germany) Eintracht Frankfurt | 1–4 | 1–1 | |
| Rangers (Scotland) | 5–4 | (Czechoslovakia) Červená Hviezda Bratislava | 4–3 | 1–1 | |
| Red Star Belgrade (Socialist Federal Republic of Yugoslavia) | 1–4 | (England) Wolverhampton Wanderers | 1–1 | 0–3 | |
| Fenerbahçe (Turkey) | 3–3 | (France) Nice | 2–1 | 1–2 | 1–5 |

=== First leg ===
21 October 1959
20:00 CET

| Boldklubben 1909 (Denmark) | 0–3 | (Austria) Wiener Sport-Club |
|---|---|---|
| | Report | Knoll 62', 75'; Horak 82' |

Atletikstadion, Odense
Attendance: 18,000
Referee: Włodzmierz Storoniak (Poland)

21 October 1959
20:30 CET

| Real Madrid (Spain) | 7–0 | (Luxembourg) Jeunesse Esch |
|---|---|---|
| Di Stéfano 25'; Puskás 34', 62', 83'; Herrera 43', 77'; Mateos 53' | Report |

Santiago Bernabéu, Madrid
Attendance: 59,447
Referee: Giulio Campanati (Italy)

25 October 1959
20:00 CET

| Sparta Rotterdam (Netherlands) | 3–1 | (Sweden) IFK Göteborg |
|---|---|---|
| Daniëls 23', 38', 48' | Report | Jonsson 81' |

Het Kasteel, Rotterdam
Attendance: 17,000
Referee: Jarl Hansen (Denmark)

4 November 1959
15:00 CET

| Milan (Italy) | 0–2 | (Spain) Barcelona |
|---|---|---|
| | Report | Vergés 12'; Suárez 15' |

San Siro, Milan
Attendance: 54,000
Referee: Marcel Lequesne (France)

4 November 1959
20:00 CET

| Young Boys (Switzerland) | 1–4 | (West Germany) Eintracht Frankfurt |
|---|---|---|
| Meier 23' | Report | Weilbächer 4'; Stein 72'; Bäumler 76' (pen.); Meier 82' |

Wankdorf, Bern
Attendance: 33,322
Referee: Daniel Zariquiegui (Spain)

11 November 1959
20:30 CET

| Rangers (Scotland) | 4–3 | (Czechoslovakia) Červená Hviezda Bratislava |
|---|---|---|
| McMillan 1'; Scott 43'; Wilson 73'; Millar 90' | Report | Scherer 16', 68'; Dolinský 29' |

Ibrox Park, Glasgow
Attendance: 80,000
Referee: Daniel Mellet (Switzerland)

11 November 1959
19:30 CET

| Red Star Belgrade (Socialist Federal Republic of Yugoslavia) | 1–1 | (England) Wolverhampton Wanderers |
|---|---|---|
| Kostić 37' | Report | Deeley 29' |

Stadion JNA, Belgrade
Attendance: 40,000
Referee: Edgar Ommerborn (West Germany)

19 November 1959
13:15 CET

| Fenerbahçe (Turkey) | 2–1 | (France) Nice |
|---|---|---|
| Bartu 37'; Has 80' | Report | Milazzo 40' |

Mithatpaşa Stadyumu, Istanbul
Attendance: 29,656
Referee: Václav Korelus (Czechoslovakia)

=== Second leg ===
4 November 1959
19:15 CET

| Wiener Sport-Club (Austria) | 2–2 | (Denmark) Boldklubben 1909 |
|---|---|---|
| Hof 46', 55' | Report | Bassett 40'; Berg 52' |

Praterstadion, Vienna
Attendance: 9,000
Referee: Józef Kowal (Poland)

Wiener Sport-Club won 5–2 on aggregate.

4 November 1959
19:30 CET

| Jeunesse Esch (Luxembourg) | 2–5 | (Spain) Real Madrid |
|---|---|---|
| Theis 10'; Schaak 15' | Report | Vidal 13'; Mateos 18', 31'; Di Stéfano 25'; Puskás 29' |

Stade Municipal, Luxembourg City
Attendance: 20,000
Referee: Vincenzo Orlandini (Italy)

Real Madrid won 12–2 on aggregate.

5 November 1959
20:00 CET

| IFK Göteborg (Sweden) | 3–1 | (Netherlands) Sparta Rotterdam |
|---|---|---|
| Ohlsson 38'; Hellmér 56' (pen.); Johansson 69' | Report | Schilder 73' |

Nya Ullevi, Gothenburg
Attendance: 6,881
Referee: Leo Helge (Denmark)

Sparta Rotterdam 4–4 IFK Göteborg on aggregate; play-off needed.

18 November 1959
20:00 CET

| Červená Hviezda Bratislava (Czechoslovakia) | 1–1 | (Scotland) Rangers |
|---|---|---|
| Tichý 89' | Report | Scott 69' |

Tehelné pole, Bratislava
Attendance: 60,000
Referee: Josef Gulde (Switzerland)

Rangers won 5–4 on aggregate.

24 November 1959
20:15 CET

| Wolverhampton Wanderers (England) | 3–0 | (Socialist Federal Republic of Yugoslavia) Red Star Belgrade |
|---|---|---|
| Murray 8'; Mason 85', 89' | Report |

Molineux, Wolverhampton
Attendance: 55,519
Referee: Erich Asmussen (West Germany)

Wolverhampton Wanderers won 4–1 on aggregate.

25 November 1959
20:00 CET

| Eintracht Frankfurt (West Germany) | 1–1 | (Switzerland) Young Boys |
|---|---|---|
| Bäumler 68' (pen.) | Report | Schneider 90' |

Waldstadion, Frankfurt-am-Main
Attendance: 30,800
Referee: José Blanco Pérez (Spain)

Eintracht Frankfurt won 5–2 on aggregate.

25 November 1959
20:30 CET

| Barcelona (Spain) | 5–1 | (Italy) Milan |
|---|---|---|
| Martínez 10'; Segarra 19'; Kubala 32', 69'; Czibor 65' | Report | Ferrario 38' |

Camp Nou, Barcelona
Attendance: 70,000
Referee: Maurice Guigue (France)

Barcelona won 7–1 on aggregate.

3 December 1959
14:30 CET

| Nice (France) | 2–1 | (Turkey) Fenerbahçe |
|---|---|---|
| Foix 62'; Faivre 76' | Report | Küçükandonyadis 83' (pen.) |

Stade du Ray, Nice
Attendance: 15,824
Referee: Martin Macko (Czechoslovakia)

Fenerbahçe 3–3 Nice on aggregate; play-off needed.

=== Play-off ===
25 November 1959
20:00 CET

| Sparta Rotterdam (Netherlands) | 3–1 | (Sweden) IFK Göteborg |
|---|---|---|
| Bosselaar 3'; Crossan 23'; Daniëls 65' | Report | Berndtsson 35' |

Weserstadion, Bremen
Attendance: 8,000
Referee: Albert Dusch (West Germany)

Sparta Rotterdam won the play-off 3–1.

23 December 1959
20:15 CET

| Nice (France) | 5–1 | (Turkey) Fenerbahçe |
|---|---|---|
| Foix 7', 63'; Milazzo 17'; Faivre 31'; De Bourgoing 59' | Report | Has 47' |

Stade des Charmilles, Geneva
Attendance: 9,166
Referee: Paul Wyssling (Switzerland)

Nice won the play-off 5–1.

== Quarter-finals ==
| Team 1 | Agg. | Team 2 | 1st leg | 2nd leg | Play-off |
|---|---|---|---|---|---|
| Nice (France) | 3–6 | (Spain) Real Madrid | 3–2 | 0–4 | |
| Barcelona (Spain) | 9–2 | (England) Wolverhampton Wanderers | 4–0 | 5–2 | |
| Eintracht Frankfurt (West Germany) | 3–2 | (Austria) Wiener Sport-Club | 2–1 | 1–1 | |
| Sparta Rotterdam (Netherlands) | 3–3 | (Scotland) Rangers | 2–3 | 1–0 | 2–3 |

=== First leg ===
4 February 1960
15:00 CET

| Nice (France) | 3–2 | (Spain) Real Madrid |
|---|---|---|
| Nurenberg 54', 67' (pen.), 72' | Report | Herrera 15'; Rial 30' |

Stade du Ray, Nice
Attendance: 21,422
Referee: Abel da Costa (Portugal)

10 February 1960
20:30 CET

| Barcelona (Spain) | 4–0 | (England) Wolverhampton Wanderers |
|---|---|---|
| Villaverde 8', 80'; Kubala 16'; Evaristo 65' | Report |

Camp Nou, Barcelona
Attendance: 80,000
Referee: Gérard Versyp (Belgium)

3 March 1960
20:00 CET

| Eintracht Frankfurt (West Germany) | 2–1 | (Austria) Wiener Sport-Club |
|---|---|---|
| Lindner 15'; Meier 60' | Report | Skerlan 50' |

Waldstadion, Frankfurt-am-Main
Attendance: 32,867
Referee: Albert Guinnard (Switzerland)

9 March 1960
20:00 CET

| Sparta Rotterdam (Netherlands) | 2–3 | (Scotland) Rangers |
|---|---|---|
| De Vries 41', 87' | Report | Wilson 4'; Baird 36'; Murray 63' |

Stadion Feijenoord, Rotterdam
Attendance: 53,000
Referee: John Kelly (England)

=== Second leg ===
2 March 1960
20:30 CET

| Real Madrid (Spain) | 4–0 | (France) Nice |
|---|---|---|
| Pepillo 21'; Gento 40'; Di Stéfano 45+5'; Puskás 51' | Report |

Santiago Bernabéu, Madrid
Attendance: 100,000
Referee: Eduardo Rosa Gouveia (Portugal)

Real Madrid won 6–3 on aggregate.

2 March 1960
20:30 CET

| Wolverhampton Wanderers (England) | 2–5 | (Spain) Barcelona |
|---|---|---|
| Murray 35'; Mason 78' | Report | Kocsis 29', 44', 61', 74'; Villaverde 79' |

Molineux, Wolverhampton
Attendance: 55,535
Referee: Lucien Van Nuffel (Belgium)

Barcelona won 9–2 on aggregate.

16 March 1960
19:15 CET

| Wiener Sport-Club (Austria) | 1–1 | (West Germany) Eintracht Frankfurt |
|---|---|---|
| Hof 31' | Report | Stein 59' |

Praterstadion, Vienna
Attendance: 47,423
Referee: Dittmar Huber (Switzerland)

Eintracht Frankfurt won 3–2 on aggregate.

16 March 1960
20:30 CET

| Rangers (Scotland) | 0–1 | (Netherlands) Sparta Rotterdam |
|---|---|---|
| | Report | Van Ede 82' |

Ibrox Park, Glasgow
Attendance: 85,000
Referee: Kevin Howley (England)

Sparta Rotterdam 3–3 Rangers on aggregate; play-off needed.

=== Play-off ===
30 March 1960
20:00 CET

| Rangers (Scotland) | 3–2 | (Netherlands) Sparta Rotterdam |
|---|---|---|
| Verhoeven 28' (o.g.); Baird 57'; Van der Lee 64' (o.g.) | Report | Verhoeven 6'; Bosselaar 76' (pen.) |

Highbury, London
Attendance: 34,178
Referee: Reginald Leafe (England)

Rangers won the play-off 3–2.

== Semi-finals ==
| Team 1 | Agg. | Team 2 | 1st leg | 2nd leg |
|---|---|---|---|---|
| Eintracht Frankfurt (West Germany) | 12–4 | (Scotland) Rangers | 6–1 | 6–3 |
| Real Madrid (Spain) | 6–2 | (Spain) Barcelona | 3–1 | 3–1 |

=== First leg ===
13 April 1960
21:00 CET

| Eintracht Frankfurt (West Germany) | 6–1 | (Scotland) Rangers |
|---|---|---|
| Stinka 29'; Pfaff 51', 55'; Lindner 73', 84'; Stein 86' | Report | Caldow 31' (pen.) |

Waldstadion, Frankfurt-am-Main
Attendance: 75,069
Referee: Gösta Lindberg (Sweden)

21 April 1960
21:30 CET

| Real Madrid (Spain) | 3–1 | (Spain) Barcelona |
|---|---|---|
| Di Stéfano 17', 84'; Puskás 28' | Report | Martínez 37' |

Santiago Bernabéu, Madrid
Attendance: 120,000
Referee: Reginald Leafe (England)

=== Second leg ===
27 April 1960
21:30 CET

| Barcelona (Spain) | 1–3 | (Spain) Real Madrid |
|---|---|---|
| Kocsis 89' | Report | Puskás 25', 75'; Gento 68' |

Camp Nou, Barcelona
Attendance: 80,000
Referee: Arthur Edward Ellis (England)

Real Madrid won 6–2 on aggregate.

5 May 1960
21:30 CET

| Rangers (Scotland) | 3–6 | (West Germany) Eintracht Frankfurt |
|---|---|---|
| McMillan 10', 54'; Wilson 74' | Report | Lindner 6'; Pfaff 20', 88'; Kreß 28'; Meier 58', 71' |

Ibrox Park, Glasgow
Attendance: 68,578
Referee: Bertil Lööw (Sweden)

Eintracht Frankfurt won 12–4 on aggregate.

== Final ==
18 May 1960
21:30 CET

| Eintracht Frankfurt (West Germany) | 3–7 | (Spain) Real Madrid |
|---|---|---|
| Kreß 18'; Stein 72', 75' | Report | Di Stéfano 27', 30', 73'; Puskás 45+1', 56' (pen.), 60', 71' |

Hampden Park, Glasgow
Attendance: 127,621
Referee: Jack Mowat (Scotland)

== Top goalscorers ==
The top scorers from the 1959–60 European Cup (including preliminary round) were as follows:

| Rank | Player | Team | Goals |
|---|---|---|---|
| 1 | (Hungary) Ferenc Puskás | (Spain) Real Madrid | 12 |
| 2 | (Spain) Alfredo Di Stéfano | (Spain) Real Madrid | 8 |
| 3 | (Hungary) László Kubala | (Spain) Barcelona | 6 |
| 3 | (Sweden) Owe Ohlsson | (Sweden) IFK Göteborg | 6 |
| 5 | (France) Jacques Foix | (France) Nice | 5 |
| 5 | (Hungary) Sándor Kocsis | (Spain) Barcelona | 5 |
| 5 | (West Germany) Erwin Stein | (West Germany) Eintracht Frankfurt | 5 |
| 8 | (Scotland) Sammy Baird | (Scotland) Rangers | 4 |
| 8 | (Netherlands) Joop Daniëls | (Netherlands) Sparta Rotterdam | 4 |
| 8 | (Brazil) Evaristo | (Spain) Barcelona | 4 |
| 8 | (West Germany) Dieter Lindner | (West Germany) Eintracht Frankfurt | 4 |
| 8 | (England) Bobby Mason | (England) Wolverhampton Wanderers | 4 |
| 8 | (Scotland) Ian McMillan | (Scotland) Rangers | 4 |
| 8 | (West Germany) Erich Meier | (West Germany) Eintracht Frankfurt | 4 |
| 8 | (Luxembourg) Victor Nurenberg | (France) Nice | 4 |
| 8 | (West Germany) Alfred Pfaff | (West Germany) Eintracht Frankfurt | 4 |
