= 1960 European Nations' Cup round of 16 =

Football tournament qualification stage

The 1960 European Nations' Cup round of 16 was the second round of the qualifying competition for the 1960 European Nations' Cup. It was contested by Czechoslovakia, the preliminary round winners, along with fifteen other countries that had received a bye. The winners of each of eight home and away ties entered the quarter-finals. The matches were played between September 1958 and October 1959.

== Qualification ==
The Republic of Ireland and Czechoslovakia faced each other in a two-legged tie, with Czechoslovakia winning and progressing to the round of 16.

== Summary ==
| Team 1 | Agg. | Team 2 | 1st leg | 2nd leg |
|---|---|---|---|---|
| Soviet Union | 4–1 | Hungary | 3–1 | 1–0 |
| France | 8–2 | Greece | 7–1 | 1–1 |
| Romania | 3–2 | Turkey | 3–0 | 0–2 |
| Norway | 2–6 | Austria | 0–1 | 2–5 |
| Yugoslavia | 3–1 | Bulgaria | 2–0 | 1–1 |
| East Germany | 2–5 | Portugal | 0–2 | 2–3 |
| Poland | 2–7 | Spain | 2–4 | 0–3 |
| Denmark | 3–7 | Czechoslovakia | 2–2 | 1–5 |

== Matches ==
The eight matches took place over two legs, taking place in 1958 and 1959. All times are CET (UTC+1).

28 September 1958
19:00

| Soviet Union | 3–1 | Hungary |
|---|---|---|
| Ilyin 4'; Metreveli 20'; Ivanov 32' | Report | Göröcs 84' |

Central Lenin Stadium, Moscow
Attendance: 100,572
Referee: Alfred Grill (Austria)
27 September 1959
15:30

| Hungary | 0–1 | Soviet Union |
|---|---|---|
| | Report | Voynov 58' |

Népstadion, Budapest
Attendance: 78,481
Referee: Jozef Kowal (Poland)

Soviet Union won 4–1 on aggregate and advanced to the quarter-finals.

1 October 1958
20:30

| France | 7–1 | Greece |
|---|---|---|
| Kopa 23'; Fontaine 25', 85'; Cisowski 29', 68'; Vincent 61', 87' | Report | Yfantis 48' |

Parc des Princes, Paris
Attendance: 37,590
Referee: Gottfried Dienst (Switzerland)
3 December 1958
15:00

| Greece | 1–1 | France |
|---|---|---|
| Marche 85' (o.g.) | Report | Bruey 71' |

Leoforos Alexandras Stadium, Athens
Attendance: 18,833
Referee: Vincenzo Orlandini (Italy)

France won 8–2 on aggregate and advanced to the quarter-finals.

2 November 1958

| Romania | 3–0 | Turkey |
|---|---|---|
| Oaidă 62'; Constantin 77'; Dinulescu 81' | Report |

Stadionul 23 August, Bucharest
Attendance: 67,200
Referee: Gottfried Dienst (Switzerland)
26 April 1959

| Turkey | 2–0 | Romania |
|---|---|---|
| Küçükandonyadis 13', 54' (pen.) | Report |

Beşiktaş İnönü Stadı, Istanbul
Attendance: 23,567
Referee: Borge Nedelkovski (Yugoslavia)

Romania won 3–2 on aggregate and advanced to the quarter-finals.

20 May 1959
19:00

| Norway | 0–1 | Austria |
|---|---|---|
| | Report | Hof 32' |

Ullevål, Oslo
Attendance: 27,566
Referee: Werner Bergmann (East Germany)
23 September 1959
19:00

| Austria | 5–2 | Norway |
|---|---|---|
| Hof 2', 25' (pen.); Nemec 21', 73'; Skerlan 60' | Report | Ødegaard 19', 35' |

Praterstadion, Vienna
Attendance: 34,989
Referee: Dimosthemis Stathatos (Greece)

Austria won 6–2 on aggregate and advanced to the quarter-finals.

31 May 1959

| Yugoslavia | 2–0 | Bulgaria |
|---|---|---|
| Galić 1'; Tasić 87' | Report |

Stadion JNA, Belgrade
Attendance: 23,418
Referee: Mihai Popa (Romania)
25 October 1959

| Bulgaria | 1–1 | Yugoslavia |
|---|---|---|
| Diev 50' | Report | Mujić 56' |

Vasil Levski Stadium, Sofia
Attendance: 27,560
Referee: Kurt Tschenscher (West Germany)

Yugoslavia won 3–1 on aggregate and advanced to the quarter-finals.

21 June 1959

| East Germany | 0–2 | Portugal |
|---|---|---|
| | Report | Matateu 12'; Coluna 67' |

Walter-Ulbricht-Stadion, Berlin
Attendance: 25,000
Referee: Alois Obtulovic (Czechoslovakia)
28 June 1959

| Portugal | 3–2 | East Germany |
|---|---|---|
| Coluna 45', 62'; Cavém 68' | Report | Vogt 47'; Kohle 72' |

Estádio das Antas, Porto
Attendance: 19,124
Referee: Juan Garay Gardeazábal (Spain)

Portugal won 5–2 on aggregate and advanced to the quarter-finals.

28 June 1959

| Poland | 2–4 | Spain |
|---|---|---|
| Pohl 34'; Brychczy 62' | Report | Suárez 40', 52'; Di Stéfano 41', 56' |

Stadion Śląski, Chorzów
Attendance: 71,469
Referee: Arthur Edward Ellis (England)
14 October 1959

| Spain | 3–0 | Poland |
|---|---|---|
| Di Stéfano 30'; Gensana 69'; Gento 85' | Report |

Estadio Santiago Bernabéu, Madrid
Attendance: 62,070
Referee: Karoly Balla (Hungary)

Spain won 7–2 on aggregate and advanced to the quarter-finals.

23 September 1959
19:00

| Denmark | 2–2 | Czechoslovakia |
|---|---|---|
| Pedersen 17'; Hansen 19' | Report | Kačáni 29'; Dolinský 42' |

Idrætsparken, Copenhagen
Attendance: 34,200
Referee: Johan Bronkhorst (Netherlands)
18 October 1959
14:15

| Czechoslovakia | 5–1 | Denmark |
|---|---|---|
| Buberník 39', 56'; Scherer 47', 86'; Dolinský 63' | Report | Kramer 33' |

Městský fotbalový stadion Srbská, Brno
Attendance: 31,217
Referee: Helmut Köhler (West Germany)

Czechoslovakia won 7–3 on aggregate and advanced to the quarter-finals.

== Goalscorers ==
There were 58 goals scored in 16 matches, for an average of 3.62 goals per match.

3 goals

- (Austria national football team) Erich Hof
- (Portugal national football team) Mário Coluna
- (Spain national football team) Alfredo Di Stéfano

2 goals

- (Austria national football team) Horst Nemec
- (Czechoslovakia national football team) Titus Buberník
- (Czechoslovakia national football team) Milan Dolinský
- (Czechoslovakia national football team) Adolf Scherer
- (France national football team) Thadée Cisowski
- (France national football team) Just Fontaine
- (France national football team) Jean Vincent
- (Norway national football team) Ove Ødegaard
- (Spain national football team) Luis Suárez
- (Turkey national football team) Lefter Küçükandonyadis

1 goal

- (Austria national football team) Karl Skerlan
- (Bulgaria national football team) Todor Diev
- (Czechoslovakia national football team) Ladislav Kačáni
- (Denmark national football team) Bent Hansen
- (Denmark national football team) John Kramer
- (Denmark national football team) Poul Pedersen
- (East Germany national football team) Horst Kohle
- (East Germany national football team) Gerhard Vogt
- (France national football team) Stéphane Bruey
- (France national football team) Raymond Kopa
- (Greece national football team) Elias Yfantis
- (Hungary national football team) János Göröcs
- (Poland national football team) Lucjan Brychczy
- (Poland national football team) Ernest Pohl
- (Portugal national football team) Domiciano Cavém
- (Portugal national football team) Matateu
- (Romania national football team) Gheorghe Constantin
- (Romania national football team) Constantin Dinulescu
- (Romania national football team) Nicolae Oaidă
- (Soviet Union national football team) Anatoli Ilyin
- (Soviet Union national football team) Valentin Ivanov
- (Soviet Union national football team) Slava Metreveli
- (Soviet Union national football team) Yuriy Voynov
- (Spain national football team) Enric Gensana
- (Spain national football team) Francisco Gento
- (Yugoslavia national football team) Milan Galić
- (Yugoslavia national football team) Muhamed Mujić
- (Yugoslavia national football team) Lazar Tasić

1 own goal

- (France national football team) Roger Marche (against Greece)
