= 1956 Latin Cup =

1956 club football tournament

Coppa Latina 1956

Tournament details
- Host country: Italy
- Dates: 29 June – 3 July 1956
- Teams: 4 (from 1 confederation)
- Venue: 1 (in 1 host city)

Final positions
- Champions: A.C. Milan (2nd title)
- Runners-up: Athletic Bilbao
- Third place: Benfica
- Fourth place: Nice

Tournament statistics
- Matches played: 4
- Goals scored: 15 (3.75 per match)
- Top scorers: (Italy) Juan Alberto Schiaffino; (3 goals)

The 1956 Latin Cup (Italian: Coppa Latina 1956) was the seventh edition of the annual Latin Cup which was played by clubs of the Southwest European nations of France, Italy, Portugal, and Spain. The tournament was hosted by Italy, and the Italian club A.C. Milan was the winner of the tournament after defeating Athletic Bilbao by a score of 3–1 in the final match.

== Participating teams ==
| Team | Method of qualification | Previous appearances |
|---|---|---|
| Nice | 1955–56 French Division 1 champions | 1952 |
| A.C. Milan | 1955–56 Serie A runners-up (Note: ACF Fiorentina declined participation in the tournament.) | 1951, 1953, 1955 |
| Benfica | 1955–56 Primeira Divisão runners-up (Note: FC Porto declined participation in the tournament.) | 1950 |
| Athletic Bilbao | 1955–56 La Liga champions | Debut |

== Venues ==
The host of the tournament was Italy, and all matches were played in one host stadium.

| Milan | 1956 Latin Cup is located in Italy |
| Arena Civica | 1956 Latin Cup is located in Italy |
| Capacity: 10,000 | 1956 Latin Cup is located in Italy |
| Arena Civica | 1956 Latin Cup is located in Italy |

== Tournament ==
=== Bracket ===
Semifinals
29 June – Paris
A.C. Milan | 4
Benfica | 2
30 June – Paris
Athletic Bilbao | 2
Nice | 0

Final
3 July – Paris
A.C. Milan | 3
Athletic Bilbao | 1
Third place match
3 July – Paris
Benfica (a.e.t.) | 2
Nice | 1

=== Semifinals ===
In the semi-final draw, it was determined that Benfica would face Milan and Athletic Bilbao would face Nice.

The game between the Italians and Portuguese started evenly, with a slight dominance by the Italian side, until the 18th minute, when Mariani opened the scoring. Benfica tried to respond, but in the 40th minute Schiaffino increased the advantage for the milanese team. In the second half, Benfica came out more aggressively, pressing their opponent, and in the 52nd minute reduced the deficit with a goal from Coluna. After the goal, the Portuguese team intensified its search for an equalizer, but, in the 59th minute, from a free-kick taken by midfielder Radice, Schiaffino scored again, making it 3–1. Seven minutes later, Caiado scored again to make it 3–2. Benfica continued to press in search of an equalizer, but a fourth goal from Milan defined the final result.

29 June 1956

| A.C. Milan | 4–2 | Benfica |
|---|---|---|
| Mariani 18'; Schiaffino 41', 57'; Bagnoli 72' | | Coluna 52'; Caiado 65' |

Arena Civica, Milan, Italy
Attendance: 10000
Referee: Julián Arqué Martín (Spain)

| AC Milan | Benfica |

| GK | 1 | (Italy) Buffon |
| DF | 2 | (Italy) Maldini |
| DF | 3 | (Italy) Pedroni |
| DF | 4 | (Italy) Zagatti |
| MF | 5 | (Sweden) Liedholm |
| MF | 6 | (Italy) Radice |
| FW | 7 | (Italy) Mariani |
| FW | 8 | (Italy) Bagnoli |
| FW | 9 | (Italy) Dal Monte |
| FW | 10 | (Uruguay) Schiaffino |
| FW | 11 | (Italy) Frignani |
Manager:
(Uruguay) Héctor Puricelli

| GL | 1 | (Portugal) José Bastos |
| DF | 2 | (Portugal) Jacinto |
| DF | 3 | (Portugal) Artur Santos |
| DF | 4 | (Portugal) Ângelo |
| MF | 5 | (Portugal) Caiado |
| MF | 6 | (Portugal) Alfredo Abrantes |
| FW | 7 | (Portugal) Isidro |
| FW | 8 | (Portugal) Coluna |
| FW | 9 | (Portugal) Águas |
| FW | 10 | (Portugal) Salvador Martins |
| FW | 11 | (Portugal) Cavém |
Manager:
(Brazil) Otto Glória

In the second semi-final, between Athletic Bilbao and Nice, the Spanish team started dominantly and, by half-time, had already built up the result, thanks to two goals in the 13th and 31st minutes, both scored by Markaida. In the second half, the course of the game reversed, with the French pressing and creating several goal opportunities, with Ujlaki having a goal disallowed, but the result did not change, with the Spanish team advancing to the final.

30 June 1956

| Athletic Bilbao | 2–0 | Nice |
|---|---|---|
| Markaida 14', 32' |

Arena Civica, Milan, Italy
Referee: Armando Marchetti (Italy)

| Athletic Bilbao | Nice |

| GK | 1 | (Spain) Carmelo Cedrún |
| DF | 2 | (Spain) José María Orúe |
| DF | 3 | (Spain) Jesús Garay |
| DF | 4 | (Spain) Canito |
| MF | 5 | (Spain) Mauri |
| MF | 6 | (Spain) José María Maguregui |
| FW | 7 | (Spain) José Luis Artetxe |
| MF | 8 | (Spain) Félix Markaida |
| FW | 9 | (Spain) Eneko Arieta |
| FW | 10 | (Spain) Ignacio Uribe |
| FW | 11 | (Spain) Agustín Gaínza |
Manager:
(Czechoslovakia) Ferdinand Daučík

| GK | 1 | (France) Dominique Colonna |
| DF | 2 | (France) Martínez |
| DF | 3 | (Argentina) González |
| DF | 4 | (France) Bonvin |
| MF | 5 | (France) Poitevin |
| MF | 6 | (Morocco) François Milazzo |
| FW | 7 | (France) Gentili |
| FW | 8 | (Algeria) Brun |
| FW | 9 | (France) Ujlaki |
| FW | 10 | (Luxembourg) Nurenberg |
| FW | 11 | (Argentina) Bravo |
Manager:
(Argentina) Luis Antonio Carniglia

=== Third place match ===
Benfica and Nice faced each other in the third-place match on July 3rd. The game was refereed by Manuel Asensi Martín of the Royal Spanish Football Federation. The Portuguese side started better, dominating and creating the main opportunities of the first half, including a shot by José Águas that hit the post. Nice responded with dangerous counter-attacks, but the first-half ended goalless. In the second half, there were no goals, and the match went to extra time. In the first period of extra time, Nice opened the scoring, forcing the lisbon team to seek an equalizer, which came in the 116th minute, forcing a second extra time. In the second extra time, Benfica regained control and in the following minutes, after a quick attacking move, José Águas scored the winning goal.

3 July 1956

| Benfica | 2–1 (a.s.d.e.t.) | Nice |
|---|---|---|
| Cavém 116'; Águas 132' | | Milazzo 102' |

Arena Civica, Milan, Italy
Referee: Manuel Asensi Martín (Spain)

| Benfica | Nice |

| GK | 1 | (Portugal) José Bastos |
| DF | 2 | (Portugal) Jacinto |
| DF | 3 | (Portugal) Artur Santos |
| MF | 4 | (Portugal) Fernando Caiado |
| MF | 5 | (Portugal) Alfredo Abrantes |
| MF | 6 | (Portugal) Ângelo Martins |
| FW | 7 | (Portugal) Isidro |
| FW | 8 | (Portugal) Mário Coluna |
| FW | 9 | (Portugal) José Águas |
| FW | 10 | (Portugal) Salvador Martins |
| FW | 11 | (Portugal) Domiciano Cavém |
Manager:
(Brazil) Otto Glória

| GK | 1 | (France) Dominique Colonna |
| DF | 2 | (Italy) Nani |
| DF | 3 | (France) Bonvin |
| DF | 4 | (Morocco) François Milazzo |
| MF | 5 | (France) Poitevin |
| MF | 6 | (Argentina) Gonzalès |
| FW | 7 | (France) Gentili |
| FW | 8 | (Algeria) Brun |
| FW | 9 | (France) Ujlaki |
| FW | 10 | (Luxembourg) Nurenberg |
| FW | 11 | (Argentina) Bravo |
Manager:
(Argentina) Luis Antonio Carniglia

=== Final ===
The final was played on July 4th between Milan and Athletic Bilbao. The Spanish side started better and dominated the first half with fast, intense and combative football, led by midfielders Mauri and Maguregui. Despite Bilbao's superiority, Milan took the lead in the 25th minute in a fortuitous play, against the course of the match. The Spaniards also wasted two big chnaces, including a header by Artetxe that hit the post. The equalizer came five minutes into the second half, however, Milan reacted calmly and with organization, imposing greater precision in their passing to neutralize the Basque team's speed. This change resulted in two decisive goals: one by Dal Monte and another by Schiaffino, the latter near the end of the match. Milan ended up winning 3–1, preventing the Spanish club from repeating their 1955 title.

3 July 1956

| A.C. Milan | 3–1 | Athletic Bilbao |
|---|---|---|
| Bagnoli 21'; Dal Monte 80'; Schiaffino 86' | | Artetxe 50' |

Arena Civica, Milan, Italy
Referee: Maurice Guigue (France)

| AC Milan | Athletic Bilbao |

| GK | (Italy) Lorenzo Buffon |
| DF | (Italy) Cesare Maldini |
| DF | (Italy) Francesco Zagatti |
| DF | (Italy) Eros Fassetta |
| DF | (Italy) Luigi Radice |
| MF | (Italy) Osvaldo Bagnoli |
| MF | (Sweden) Nils Liedholm |
| MF | (Italy) Amos Mariani |
| FW | (Uruguay) Juan Alberto Schiaffino |
| FW | (Italy) Amleto Frignani |
| FW | (Italy) Giorgio Dal Monte |
Manager:
(Uruguay) Héctor Puricelli

| GK | (Spain) Carmelo Cedrún |
| DF | (Spain) José María Orúe |
| DF | (Spain) Canito |
| DF | (Spain) Jesús Garay |
| MF | (Spain) Félix Markaida |
| MF | (Spain) Mauri |
| MF | (Spain) José María Maguregui |
| FW | (Spain) Ignacio Uribe |
| FW | (Spain) Eneko Arieta |
| FW | (Spain) José Luis Artetxe |
| FW | (Spain) Agustín Gaínza |
Manager:
(Czechoslovakia) Ferdinand Daučík

1956 Latin Cup Champions
(Italy)
A.C. Milan
2nd title

== Goalscorers ==
| Rank | Player | Team | Goals |
|---|---|---|---|
| 1 | (Uruguay) Juan Alberto Schiaffino | (Italy) A.C. Milan | 3 |
| 2 | (Italy) Osvaldo Bagnoli | (Italy) A.C. Milan | 2 |
| 2 | (Spain) Félix Markaida | (Spain) Athletic Bilbao | 2 |
| 3 | (Spain) José Luis Artetxe | (Spain) Athletic Bilbao | 1 |
| 3 | (Morocco) François Milazzo | (France) Nice | 1 |
| 3 | (Italy) Amos Mariani | (Italy) A.C. Milan | 1 |
| 3 | (Italy) Giorgio Dal Monte | (Italy) A.C. Milan | 1 |
| 3 | (Portugal) Mário Coluna | (Portugal) Benfica | 1 |
| 3 | (Portugal) Fernando Caiado | (Portugal) Benfica | 1 |
| 3 | (Portugal) Domiciano Cavém | (Portugal) Benfica | 1 |
| 3 | (Portugal) José Águas | (Portugal) Benfica | 1 |

== See also ==
- 1956 Mitropa Cup, a similar competition
