= 1960 European Nations' Cup qualifying preliminary round =

- Event: 1960 European Nations' Cup qualifying
Republic of Ireland	Czechoslovakia
2	4
- Czechoslovakia won 4–2 on aggregate and advanced to the round of 16.

First leg
Republic of Ireland	Czechoslovakia
2	0
- Date: 5 April 1959
- Venue: Dalymount Park, Dublin
- Referee: Lucien Van Nuffel (Belgium)
- Attendance: 37,500

Second leg
Czechoslovakia	Republic of Ireland
4	0
- Date: 10 May 1959
- Venue: Tehelné pole, Bratislava
- Referee: Joseph Barbéran (France)
- Attendance: 41,691

The 1960 European Nations' Cup qualifying preliminary round was the first round of the qualifying competition for the 1960 European Nations' Cup. The tie was played over two legs, home and away, in April and May 1959 and was contested by the Republic of Ireland and Czechoslovakia, as they were randomly selected to play each other. The winner on aggregate would advance to the round of 16.

The first leg was played on 5 April 1959, and won by the Republic of Ireland 2–0. Czechoslovakia won the return leg 4–0 on 10 May 1959, and therefore Czechoslovakia won 4–2 on aggregate. As winners, Czechoslovakia entered the round of 16 with the fifteen nations that had received a bye.

Because some of the matches of the round of 16 had already taken place when the matches of the preliminary round did, Republic of Ireland vs Czechoslovakia was not actually the first ever European Championship match (Soviet Union vs Hungary was), nor was the Republic of Ireland the first team to ever be eliminated from a European Championship (Greece was).

== Summary ==
Team 1	Agg.	Team 2	1st leg	2nd leg
Republic of Ireland	2–4	Czechoslovakia	2–0	0–4

== Matches ==
=== First leg details ===
5 April 1959
15:30 CET

Republic of Ireland	2–0	Czechoslovakia
Tuohy 22'; Cantwell 42' (pen.)	Report

Dalymount Park, Dublin
Attendance: 37,500
Referee: Lucien Van Nuffel (Belgium)

Republic of Ireland	Czechoslovakia

GK	1	Jimmy O'Neill
RB	2	Brendan McNally
LB	3	Noel Cantwell (c)
RH	6	Pat Saward
CH	5	Charlie Hurley
LH	4	Mick McGrath
OR	7	Alf Ringstead
IR	8	Tommy Hamilton
CF	9	Christy Doyle
IR	10	George Cummins
OL	11	Liam Tuohy
Manager:
Johnny Carey & Selection Committee

GK	1	Imrich Stacho
RB	4	Gustáv Mráz	(substituted off) 23'
LB	2	Jiří Tichý
RH	5	Svatopluk Pluskal (c)
CH	3	Ján Popluhár
LH	6	Titus Buberník
OR	7	Jan Brumovský
IR	8	Anton Moravčík
CF	9	Ladislav Kačáni
IL	10	Pavol Molnár
OL	11	Tadeusz Kraus
Substitutions:
DF	12	Jiří Hildebrandt	(substituted on) 23'
Manager:
(Austria) Rudolf Vytlačil

Match rules

- 90 minutes.
- Maximum of one substitution.

=== Second leg details ===
10 May 1959
16:00 CET

Czechoslovakia	4–0	Republic of Ireland
Stacho 4' (pen.); Buberník 57'; Pavlovič 66'; Dolinský 75'	Report

Tehelné pole, Bratislava
Attendance: 41,691
Referee: Joseph Barbéran (France)

Czechoslovakia	Republic of Ireland

GK	1	Imrich Stacho
RB	2	Jiří Tichý
LB	4	Ladislav Novák (c)
RH	5	Štefan Matlák
CH	3	Ján Popluhár
LH	6	Titus Buberník
OR	7	Ladislav Pavlovič
IR	8	Adolf Scherer
CF	10	Ladislav Kačáni
IL	9	Vlastimil Bubník
OL	11	Milan Dolinský
Manager:
(Austria) Rudolf Vytlačil

GK	1	Jimmy O'Neill
RB	2	Dick Whittaker
LB	3	Noel Cantwell (c)
RH	4	Frank O'Farrell
CH	5	Charlie Hurley
LH	6	Mick McGrath
OR	7	Alf Ringstead
IR	8	Tommy Hamilton
CF	9	Arthur Fitzsimons
IR	10	George Cummins
OL	11	Liam Tuohy
Manager:
Johnny Carey & Selection Committee

Match rules

- 90 minutes.
- 30 minutes of extra time if necessary.
- Replay if scores still level on aggregate.
- Maximum of one substitution.

== Goalscorers ==
There were 6 goals scored in 2 matches, for an average of 3 goals per match.

1 goal

- (Czechoslovakia national football team) Titus Buberník
- (Czechoslovakia national football team) Milan Dolinský
- (Czechoslovakia national football team) Ladislav Pavlovič
- (Czechoslovakia national football team) Imrich Stacho
- (Republic of Ireland national football team) Noel Cantwell
- (Republic of Ireland national football team) Liam Tuohy
