= 1954 Coupe de France final =

- Event: 1953–54 Coupe de France
Nice	Marseille
2	1
- Date: 23 May 1954
- Venue: Olympique Yves-du-Manoir, Colombes
- Referee: Édouard Harzic
- Attendance: 56,803

The 1954 Coupe de France final was a football match held at Stade Olympique Yves-du-Manoir, Colombes on May 23, 1954, that saw OGC Nice defeat Olympique de Marseille 2–1 thanks to goals by Victor Nuremberg and Luis Carniglia.

== Match details ==
23 May 1954

Nice	2–1	Marseille
Nuremberg 6'; Carniglia 11'		Andersson 55'

Stade Olympique Yves-du-Manoir, Colombes
Attendance: 56,803
Referee: Édouard Harzic

GK	(France) Babkin Hairabedian
DF	(France) Mokhtar Ben Nacef
DF	(Argentina) Hector César Gonzales
DF	(France) Antoine Cuissard	(c)
DF	(France) Guy Poitevin
MF	(France) Abderrahmane Mahjoub
MF	(France) (Hungary) Joseph Ujlaki
MF	(France) Emile Antonio
MF	(Argentina) Luis Carniglia
FW	(France) Just Fontaine
FW	(Luxembourg) Victor Nuremberg
Manager:
(England) Bill Berry Assistant Referees: Fourth Official:

GK	(France) Pierre Angel	(c)
DF	(France) Maurice Gransart
DF	(France) Abdesselem Ben Miloud
DF	(France) Barthélémy Mesas
DF	(Sweden) Gunnar Johansson
MF	(France) Gabriel Rossi
MF	(France) Jean Palluch
FW	(France) Larbi Ben Barek
FW	(Sweden) (France) Gunnar Andersson
FW	(France) Roger Scotti
FW	(France) François Mercurio
Manager:
(France) Henri Roessler

== See also ==
- 1953–54 Coupe de France
