= Poul =

- Gender: Male
- Language: Danish

Origin
- Region of origin: Denmark

Other names
- Related names: Paul; Povl

Poul is a Danish masculine given name. It is the Danish cognate of the name Paul. Notable people with the name include:

== People ==
- Poul Andersen (1922–2006), Danish printer
- Poul Anderson (1926–2001), American writer
- Poul Erik Andreasen (born 1949), Danish football player and manager
- Poul Bang (1905–1967), Danish filmmaker
- Poul Bassett (born 1928), Canadian soccer player
- Poul Anker Bech (1942–2009), Danish painter
- Poul Bjerre (1876–1964), Swedish psychiatrist
- Poul Borum (1934–1996), Danish writer
- Poul Bundgaard (1922–1998), Danish actor
- Poul Cederquist (1916–1993), Danish hammer thrower
- Poul Simon Christiansen (1855–1933), Danish painter
- Poul Skytte Christoffersen (born 1946), Danish diplomat
- Poul Elming (born 1949), Danish opera singer
- Poul Glargaard (1942–2011), Danish actor
- Poul Hansen (1913–1966), Danish politician
- Poul Hartling (1914–2000), Danish politician and Prime Minister
- Poul Heegaard (1871–1948), Danish mathematician
- Poul Henningsen (1894–1967), Danish writer and architect
- Poul Richard Høj Jensen (born 1944), Danish sailor
- Poul Christian Holst (1776–1863), Norwegian politician
- Poul Hultberg (1920–2016), Danish architect
- Poul Hübertz (born 1976), Danish football player
- Poul Ove Jensen (born 1937), Danish architect
- Poul S. Jessen, Danish-American optical physicist
- Poul Jessen (1926–2015), Danish gymnast
- Poul F. Joensen (1898–1970), Faroese poet
- Poul Kjærholm (1929–1980), Danish designer
- Poul Krebs (born 1956), Danish musician
- Poul la Cour (1846–1908), Danish scientist
- Poul Lange (born 1956), Danish artist
- Poul Martin Møller (1794–1838), Danish writer
- Poul Michelsen (born 1944), Faroese politician
- Poul Müller (1909–1979), Danish actor
- Poul Nesgaard (born 1952), Danish television producer
- Poul Nielsen (1891–1962), Danish football player
- Poul Nielson (born 1943), Danish politician
- Poul Nyrup Rasmussen (born 1943), Danish politician and Prime Minister
- Poul Popiel (born 1943), Danish ice hockey player
- Poul Reichhardt (1913–1985), Danish actor
- Poul Ruders (born 1949), Danish composer
- Poul Schierbeck (1888–1949), Danish composer
- Poul Schlüter (1929–2021), Danish politician and Prime Minister
- Poul Sørensen, multiple persons
- Poul Christian Stemann (1764–1855), Danish politician
- Poul Schiang (1904–1981), Danish sprinter
- Poul Svendsen (1927–2024), Danish rower
- Poul Thomsen (1922–1988), Danish actor
- Poul Erik Tøjner (born 1959), Danish museum director
- Poul Vad (1927–2003), Danish writer and art historian
- Poul Volther (1923–2001), Danish furniture designer
- Poul Weber (born 1949), Danish politician

== See also ==
- Poul Creek Formation, Alaska
- Paul (name)
- Povl
