= 1960 European Nations' Cup quarter-finals =

The 1960 European Nations' Cup quarter-finals was the third round of the qualifying competition for the 1960 European Nations' Cup. It was contested by the eight winners from the round of 16. The winners of each of four home-and-away ties entered the final tournament. The matches were played in 1959 and 1960.

== Qualification ==
Each tie winner progressed to the quarter-finals. The quarter-finals were played in two legs on a home-and-away basis. The winners of the quarter-finals would go through to the final tournament.

== Summary ==
Team 1	Agg.	Team 2	1st leg	2nd leg
France	9–4	Austria	5–2	4–2
Portugal	3–6	Yugoslavia	2–1	1–5
Romania	0–5	Czechoslovakia	0–2	0–3
Spain	w/o (Note: Spain refused to travel to the Soviet Union for their quarter-final, so Spain were disqualified and the Soviet Union were awarded a walkover victory.)	Soviet Union	Canc.	Canc.

== Matches ==
The eight matches took place over two legs, taking place in 1959 and 1960. All times are CET (UTC+1).

13 December 1959
14:30

France	5–2	Austria
Fontaine 6', 18', 70'; Vincent 38', 82'	Report	Horak 40'; Pichler 65'

Stade Olympique de Colombes, Colombes
Attendance: 43,775
Referee: Manuel Martín Asensi (Spain)
27 March 1960
15:00

Austria	2–4	France
Nemec 26'; Probst 64'	Report	Marcel 46'; Rahis 59'; Heutte 77'; Kopa 83' (pen.)

Praterstadion, Vienna
Attendance: 39,229
Referee: Leo Helge (Denmark)

France won 9–4 on aggregate and qualified for the 1960 European Nations' Cup.

8 May 1960
17:00

Portugal	2–1	Yugoslavia
Santana 30'; Matateu 70'	Report	Kostić 81'

Estádio Nacional, Lisbon
Attendance: 39,978
Referee: Joseph Barbéran (France)
22 May 1960
16:45

Yugoslavia	5–1	Portugal
Šekularac 8'; Čebinac 45'; Kostić 50', 88'; Galić 79'	Report	Cavém 29'

Stadion JNA, Belgrade
Attendance: 43,000
Referee: Josef Stoll (Austria)

Yugoslavia won 6–3 on aggregate and qualified for the 1960 European Nations' Cup.

22 May 1960
15:00

Romania	0–2	Czechoslovakia
	Report	Masopust 8'; Bubník 45'

Stadionul 23 August, Bucharest
Attendance: 61,306
Referee: Andor Dorogi (Hungary)
29 May 1960
16:30

Czechoslovakia	3–0	Romania
Buberník 1', 15'; Bubník 18'	Report

Tehelné pole, Bratislava
Attendance: 31,057
Referee: Leif Gulliksen (Norway)

Czechoslovakia won 5–0 on aggregate and qualified for the 1960 European Nations' Cup.

22 May 1960

Spain	Cancelled (Note: Spain refused to travel to the Soviet Union for their quarter-final, so Spain were disqualified and the Soviet Union were awarded a walkover victory.)	Soviet Union
	Report

29 May 1960

Soviet Union	Cancelled	Spain
	Report

Spain withdrew. Soviet Union won on walkover and qualified for the 1960 European Nations' Cup.

== Goalscorers ==
There were 27 goals scored in 6 matches, for an average of 4.5 goals per match.

3 goals

- (France national football team) Just Fontaine
- (Yugoslavia national football team) Bora Kostić

2 goals

- (Czechoslovakia national football team) Titus Buberník
- (Czechoslovakia national football team) Vlastimil Bubník
- (France national football team) Jean Vincent

1 goal

- (Austria national football team) Walter Horak
- (Austria national football team) Horst Nemec
- (Austria national football team) Rudolf Pichler
- (Austria national football team) Erich Probst
- (Czechoslovakia national football team) Josef Masopust
- (France national football team) François Heutte
- (France national football team) Raymond Kopa
- (France national football team) Jean-Jacques Marcel
- (France national football team) Bernard Rahis
- (Portugal national football team) Domiciano Cavém
- (Portugal national football team) Matateu
- (Portugal national football team) Santana
- (Yugoslavia national football team) Zvezdan Čebinac
- (Yugoslavia national football team) Milan Galić
- (Yugoslavia national football team) Dragoslav Šekularac
