= 1958–59 French Division 1 =

21st season of French Division 1

Division Nationale
- Season: 1958–59
- Champions: OGC Nice
- Relegated: FC Nancy; Lille OSC; Olympique Alès; Olympique de Marseille
- European Cup: OGC Nice
- Inter-Cities Fairs Cup: Olympique Lyonnais
- Matches: 380
- Goals: 1,257 (3.31 per match)
- Top goalscorer: Thadée Cisowski (30 goals)
- Biggest home win: Stade de Reims 7–1 FC Nancy; RC Lens 6–0 RC Strasbourg
- Biggest away win: Lille OSC 1–6 RC Paris
- Highest scoring: FC Sochaux-Montbéliard 4–5 Olympique Alès; Olympique Alès 3–6 Stade de Reims; FC Nancy 3–6 OGC Nice; RC Paris 7–2 Lille OSC

OGC Nice won Division 1 season 1958–59 of the French Association Football League with 56 points.

== Participating teams ==
Location of teams in 1958–59 Division 1
- Olympique Alès
- Angers SCO
- RC Lens
- Lille OSC
- Limoges FC
- Olympique Lyonnais
- Olympique de Marseille
- AS Monaco
- FC Nancy
- OGC Nice
- Nîmes Olympique
- RC Paris
- Stade de Reims
- Stade Rennais UC
- AS Saint-Etienne
- UA Sedan-Torcy
- FC Sochaux-Montbéliard
- RC Strasbourg
- Toulouse FC
- US Valenciennes-Anzin

== Final table ==
Pos	Team	Pld	W	D	L	GF	GA	GAv	Pts	Qualification or relegation
1	Nice (C)	38	24	8	6	80	38	2.105	56	Qualification to European Cup preliminary round
2	Nîmes	38	21	11	6	75	40	1.875	53	
3	Racing Paris	38	18	13	7	84	47	1.787	49	
4	Reims	38	19	10	9	84	59	1.424	48	
5	Sochaux	38	17	9	12	70	64	1.094	43	
6	Saint-Étienne	38	16	8	14	68	73	0.932	40	
7	Angers	38	13	13	12	66	58	1.138	39	
8	Monaco	38	14	11	13	52	51	1.020	39	
9	Lyon	38	16	7	15	62	68	0.912	39	
10	Sedan	38	12	14	12	65	53	1.226	38	
11	Strasbourg	38	14	10	14	65	76	0.855	38	
12	Rennes	38	13	10	15	61	61	1.000	36	
13	Valenciennes	38	13	10	15	53	63	0.841	36	
14	Toulouse	38	12	11	15	59	59	1.000	35	
15	Limoges	38	12	10	16	48	57	0.842	34	
16	Lens	38	12	8	18	56	66	0.848	32	
17	Nancy (R)	38	10	9	19	58	79	0.734	29	Relegation to French Division 2
18	Lille (R)	38	9	11	18	56	78	0.718	29	Relegation to French Division 2
19	Alès (R)	38	8	8	22	45	83	0.542	24	Relegation to French Division 2
20	Marseille (R)	38	6	11	21	50	84	0.595	23	Relegation to French Division 2

Rules for classification: Victory: 2 points, Draw: 1 point, Defeat: 0 points
(C) Champions; (R) Relegated

Promoted from Division 2, who will play in Division 1 season 1959/1960

- Le Havre AC: Champion of Division 2, (Winner of Coupe de France)
- Stade Français FC: runner-up of Division 2
- SC Toulon: Third place
- Bordeaux: Fourth place

== Results ==
Home \ Away	ALÈ	ANG	RCL	LIL	LFC	OL	OM	ASM	FCN	NIC	NMS	RCP	REI	REN	STE	SED	SOC	RS	TOU	VAL
Alès		1–3	2–6	1–2	0–2	1–2	2–1	2–1	0–3	0–0	0–4	1–1	3–6	0–1	1–1	1–1	2–1	1–0	1–0	3–0
Angers	1–0		2–2	2–0	4–0	3–1	3–2	0–0	4–2	1–2	1–1	1–2	3–0	0–0	0–1	3–1	1–1	2–2	3–1	4–0
Lens	2–4	1–1		2–2	1–1	2–1	4–1	2–1	2–4	0–0	0–1	2–1	2–1	2–0	0–2	0–2	3–2	6–0	0–1	2–0
Lille	5–0	1–1	1–1		2–0	2–1	2–2	2–2	2–0	0–0	0–0	1–6	0–2	4–4	2–4	0–3	3–0	2–3	3–2	6–1
Limoges	2–2	2–2	2–1	5–0		1–0	1–0	2–1	0–0	0–2	3–2	1–1	2–2	2–4	4–0	1–1	1–2	1–2	0–0	1–0
Lyon	1–1	1–0	2–0	1–0	2–1		1–1	4–1	1–3	1–0	2–1	3–2	1–5	5–2	2–0	4–3	2–0	2–2	1–1	2–2
Marseille	2–1	2–3	0–2	0–0	2–0	1–1		0–2	4–2	2–0	0–2	1–2	2–3	1–3	4–1	1–1	0–0	3–3	1–1	3–1
Monaco	1–1	1–0	0–0	3–0	0–0	4–1	2–0		1–0	1–1	1–1	4–1	0–2	1–0	0–3	0–3	1–0	2–1	1–0	2–1
Nancy	3–0	3–2	2–1	1–1	0–2	4–3	2–2	2–2		3–6	2–1	1–2	3–5	2–1	0–1	0–1	2–2	0–1	0–1	1–1
Nice	4–2	0–3	3–1	2–1	3–1	2–0	6–1	2–0	3–0		2–0	3–2	4–0	2–0	1–0	3–1	5–0	4–2	3–2	1–0
Nîmes	3–0	5–3	4–2	3–0	3–0	4–1	1–1	1–0	1–0	1–1		0–0	2–2	3–0	2–1	2–2	2–1	1–1	3–1	2–0
Racing Paris	5–2	5–0	5–0	7–2	4–1	2–2	2–1	2–0	4–4	1–1	2–2		0–1	1–0	2–2	1–1	0–2	5–2	2–0	3–0
Reims	1–1	1–1	4–1	4–3	1–0	1–2	2–1	3–2	7–1	1–2	3–1	0–0		4–0	3–0	1–1	1–3	2–3	3–1	2–1
Rennes	4–2	3–2	1–1	3–0	0–1	2–4	2–2	2–1	3–1	0–3	1–2	0–1	2–2		0–2	3–1	4–0	2–2	3–0	4–0
Saint-Étienne	1–0	1–1	3–0	1–0	2–1	2–0	4–2	3–5	4–0	3–4	0–1	3–3	4–4	2–2		2–1	4–3	1–5	4–3	1–1
Sedan	2–0	2–2	1–2	1–1	3–1	3–1	6–1	2–2	1–2	1–0	1–2	0–3	0–0	1–1	5–0		0–1	1–3	1–1	4–0
Sochaux	4–5	2–1	2–1	2–3	3–1	5–3	5–1	3–2	2–1	1–0	3–2	1–1	3–1	2–1	3–1	2–2		3–0	2–2	1–1
Strasbourg	2–0	4–2	1–0	2–0	1–1	3–0	3–1	1–1	1–1	2–2	1–5	0–2	0–2	0–1	3–3	1–3	2–1		1–2	3–2
Toulouse FC	4–2	1–1	3–1	3–1	2–1	0–1	3–0	1–2	3–2	2–2	2–4	1–1	1–1	1–1	2–0	4–1	1–1	5–1		1–2
Valenciennes	1–0	4–0	3–1	3–2	2–3	1–0	5–1	2–2	1–1	2–1	0–0	1–0	3–1	1–1	3–1	1–1	1–1	4–1	2–0	

Legend: Blue = home team win; Yellow = draw; Red = away team win.

== Top goalscorers ==
Rank	Player	Club	Goals
1	(France) (Poland) Thadée Cisowski	Racing Paris	30
2	(Morocco) Hassan Akesbi	Nîmes	24
2	(France) Just Fontaine	Reims	24
4	(France) Mahi Khennane	Rennes	23
5	(France) Roger Piantoni	Reims	20
6	(France) (Poland) Henri Skiba	Nîmes	19
6	(France) N'Ganga Samuel Edimo	Sochaux	19
6	(France) (Poland) Antoine Groschulski	Strasbourg	19
9	(France) Stéphane Bruey	Angers	18
9	(France) Jacques Foix	Nice	18
9	(France) Eugène Njo-Léa	Saint-Étienne	18
9	(France) Ginès Liron	Valenciennes	18

== OGC Nice Winning Squad 1958-'59 ==
Goal

- (France) Georges Lamia

Defence

- (France) André Chorda
- (France) Alain Cornu
- (Argentina) César Hector Gonzales
- (France) Alphonse Martinez
- (France) Guy Poitevin

Midfield

- (France) Ferenc Kocsur
- (France) François Milazzo
- (France) Vincent Scanella

Attack

- (France) Jean-Pierre Alba
- (Mali) Oumar Barrou
- (France) Jacques Faivre
- (France) Jacques Foix
- (Argentina) Alberto Muro
- (Luxembourg) Victor Nurenberg

Unknown

- (France) René Vergé

Management

- (France) Jean Luciano (Coach)

== Attendances ==
#	Club	Average
1	Racing	20,455
2	Nice	13,653
3	Stade rennais	12,305
4	Marseille	11,232
5	Limoges	9,841
6	Saint-Étienne	8,907
7	LOSC	8,572
8	Lens	8,462
9	Strasbourg	8,436
10	Reims	8,343
11	Nîmes	8,335
12	Toulouse	7,843
13	Valenciennes	7,631
14	Olympique lyonnais	7,516
15	Angers	7,286
16	Nancy	6,481
17	Sochaux	6,420
18	Sedan	4,755
19	Alès	4,650
20	Monaco	3,425
