= 1955–56 French Division 1 =

18th season of French Division 1

Division Nationale
- Season: 1955–56
- Champions: Nice
- Relegated: Lille; Bordeaux; AS Troyes-Savinienne
- European Cup: Nice

OGC Nice won Division 1 season 1955/1956 of the French Association Football League with 43 points.

== Participating teams ==
- Bordeaux
- RC Lens
- Lille OSC
- Olympique Lyonnais
- Olympique de Marseille
- FC Metz
- AS Monaco
- FC Nancy
- OGC Nice
- Nîmes Olympique
- RC Paris
- Stade de Reims
- AS Saint-Etienne
- UA Sedan-Torcy
- FC Sochaux-Montbéliard
- RC Strasbourg
- Toulouse FC
- AS Troyes-Savinienne
Location of teams in 1955–56 Division 1

== Final table ==
Pos	Team	Pld	W	D	L	GF	GA	GAv	Pts	Qualification or relegation
1	Nice (C)	34	18	7	9	60	43	1.395	43	Qualification to European Cup preliminary round
2	Lens	34	19	4	11	65	49	1.327	42	
3	Monaco	34	17	7	10	63	45	1.400	41	
4	Saint-Étienne	34	15	11	8	68	53	1.283	41	
5	Marseille	34	16	8	10	55	49	1.122	40	
6	Racing Paris	34	17	5	12	74	58	1.276	39	
7	Toulouse	34	14	10	10	51	46	1.109	38	
8	Lyon	34	15	7	12	50	49	1.020	37	
9	Sedan	34	14	8	12	53	56	0.946	36	
10	Reims	34	13	8	13	61	50	1.220	34	
11	Sochaux	34	12	8	14	47	50	0.940	32	
12	Nancy	34	13	6	15	51	61	0.836	32	
13	Nîmes	34	11	9	14	64	56	1.143	31	
14	Strasbourg	34	12	6	16	54	66	0.818	30	
15	Metz	34	11	7	16	49	68	0.721	29	
16	Lille (R)	34	10	4	20	58	65	0.892	24	Qualification to relegation play-offs
17	Bordeaux (R)	34	9	6	19	45	69	0.652	24	Relegation to French Division 2
18	Troyes-Savinienne (R)	34	5	9	20	43	78	0.551	19	Relegation to French Division 2

Rules for classification: Victory: 2 points, Draw: 1 point, Defeat: 0 points
(C) Champions; (R) Relegated

Promoted from Division 2, who will play in Division 1 season 1956/1957

- Stade Rennais UC:Champion of Division 2
- Angers SCO:runner-up
- US Valenciennes-Anzin: Third place

== Results ==
Home \ Away	BOR	RCL	LIL	OL	OM	MET	ASM	FCN	NIC	NIM	RCP	REI	STE	SED	SOC	RCS	TOU	TRO
Bordeaux		1–2	2–1	2–0	1–0	2–1	0–2	3–3	1–2	2–1	1–4	2–3	4–3	2–1	0–1	3–0	3–4	2–2
Lens	2–0		1–0	1–0	4–0	4–1	1–2	3–2	4–0	3–1	7–3	4–1	2–2	4–0	2–1	1–0	1–0	3–1
Lille	2–1	1–1		4–1	0–3	4–1	2–0	1–2	2–1	3–2	6–1	2–2	0–2	0–1	1–2	4–0	1–2	4–0
Lyon	5–2	0–1	2–1		1–1	2–1	1–1	2–0	2–4	0–0	3–1	2–1	2–1	0–0	3–1	2–0	2–2	3–0
Marseille	3–0	2–2	2–1	5–1		4–0	1–1	1–2	0–0	2–0	1–4	1–0	2–2	2–2	1–0	3–1	3–0	3–0
Metz	1–1	2–3	2–0	1–1	2–3		1–2	2–0	2–0	2–2	1–3	1–1	5–2	3–1	3–1	2–2	1–0	2–1
Monaco	4–2	5–2	2–0	2–1	3–0	4–0		2–2	4–2	1–0	0–0	2–1	2–3	0–2	4–0	0–0	1–0	1–1
Nancy	1–0	1–0	3–1	2–0	1–2 (Note: The match between Nancy and Marseille was abandoned when the score was 2–4 and was subsequently rated 0–0 as a victory for Marseille.)	1–3			2–0	3–1	2–3	1–4	2–2	4–2	0–1	3–1	1–2	1–0
Nice	2–0	5–2	7–1	2–0	1–2	1–0	1–1	3–0		2–1	2–0	1–0	2–1	3–2	1–2	2–1	1–0	2–0
Nîmes	3–0	3–1	2–0	2–1	1–1	0–0	6–2	6–1	1–1		1–5	2–2	1–1	6–2	1–0	4–0	2–1	5–2
Racing Paris	3–0	0–1	2–1	1–2	4–0	1–2	2–1	3–4	4–2	3–2		2–1	3–0	4–0	2–5	2–2	3–0	1–1
Reims	3–0	3–0	1–1	3–0	1–1	5–2	0–2	1–2	1–3	1–1	2–1		1–2	1–1	3–0	6–2	0–1	2–1
Saint-Étienne	3–0	0–0	4–1	0–1	3–1	5–0	1–0	1–1	3–3	3–1	3–2	3–1		3–2	0–0	3–1	0–0	4–0
Sedan	1–1	1–0	2–1	2–2	2–1	4–2	2–1	1–0	0–1	2–1	3–0	1–1	3–0		2–1	5–2	1–1	1–3
Sochaux	2–4	3–1	3–3	1–2	3–1	0–1	3–1	0–0	0–0	1–0	1–1	4–3	2–3	0–2		2–2	0–0	5–1
Strasbourg	1–1	1–0	3–1	1–2	5–0	3–1	2–1	4–0	1–0	2–1	1–4	0–1	5–2	3–0	1–0		1–2	2–1
Toulouse FC	2–1	4–2	4–2	2–1	2–3	4–1	3–1	1–0	1–1	2–2	0–0	0–2	2–2	1–1	0–1	4–4		2–1
Troyes-Savinienne	1–1	3–0	1–6	1–3	0–1	1–1	2–5	4–4	2–2	4–2	0–2	2–3	1–1	2–1	1–1	3–0	0–2	

Legend: Blue = home team win; Yellow = draw; Red = away team win.

== Relegation play-offs ==
Team 1	Series	Team 2	Game 1	Game 2	Game 3
Valenciennes	6–2	Lille	1–0	1–2	4–0

== Top goalscorers ==
Rank	Player	Club	Goals
1	(France) (Poland) Thadée Cisowski	Racing Paris	31
2	(France) Rachid Mekloufi	Saint-Étienne	21
3	(Sweden) Gunnar Andersson	Marseille	20
3	(France) Jacques Foix	Saint-Étienne	20
5	(France) René Bliard	Reims	19
6	(Austria) Ernst Stojaspal	Strasbourg	18
7	(France) Roger Piantoni	Nancy	17
7	(Morocco) Hassan Akesbi	Nîmes	17
9	(Sweden) Egon Jonsson	Lens	16
9	(Argentina) Raúl Conti	Monaco	16

== OGC Nice Winning Squad 1955-'56 ==
Goal

- (France) Dominique Colonna
- (France) Henri Hairabedian

Defence

- (France) Gilbert Bonvin
- (France) Rémy Fronzoni
- (Argentina) César Hector Gonzales
- (France) Alphonse Martinez
- (Italy) Aleardo Nani
- (France) Guy Poitevin

Midfield

- (Brazil) José Carlos Brandaozinho
- (France) Jean Luciano
- (France) François Milazzo

Attack

- (France) Jean-Pierre Alba
- (Morocco) Mohammed Abderrazak
- (Argentina) Ruben Bravo
- (France) Robert Brun
- (France) Just Fontaine
- (Luxembourg) Victor Nuremberg
- (France) Joseph Ujlaki

Management

- (Argentina) Luis Carniglia (Coach)

== Attendances ==
#	Club	Average
1	Racing	19,687
2	Marseille	17,026
3	Nice	14,265
4	Olympique lyonnais	13,443
5	Strasbourg	12,182
6	Lens	12,116
7	Girondins	11,862
8	Saint-Étienne	10,882
9	Lille	10,510
10	Toulouse	9,533
11	Metz	8,567
12	Nancy	8,236
13	Nîmes	8,199
14	Sedan	8,071
15	Reims	8,057
16	Sochaux	7,129
17	ASTS	5,155
18	Monaco	4,326
