= Povl =

- Gender: Male
- Language: Danish

Origin
- Region of origin: Denmark

Other names
- Related names: Paul; Poul

Povl is a Danish masculine given name. It is the Danish cognate of the name Paul. The name may refer to:

== People ==
- Povl Ahm (1926–2005), Danish engineer
- Povl Bang-Jensen (1909–1959), Danish diplomat
- Povl Baumann (1878–1963), Danish architect
- Povl Erik Carstensen (born 1960), Danish comedian and actor
- Povl Christensen (1909–1977), Danish artist
- Povl Dissing (1938–2022), Danish singer, musician, and composer
- Povl Ole Fanger (1934–2006), Danish engineer
- Povl Gerlow (1881–1959), Danish sports shooter
- Povl Hamburger (1901–1972), Danish organist and composer
- Povl Kjøller (1937–1999), Danish musician
- Povl Mark (1889–1957), Danish gymnast
- Povl Riis (1925–2017), Danish physician
- Povl Riis-Knudsen (born 1950), Danish neo-Nazi
- Povl Søndergaard (1905–1986), Danish sculptor
- Povl Stegmann (1888–1944), Danish architect
- Povl Winning Toussieng (1892–1967), Danish doctor
- Povl Wøldike (1899–1975), Danish actor

== See also ==
- Poul
- Paul (name)
