= Amos Mariani =

Italian footballer and coach (1931–2007)

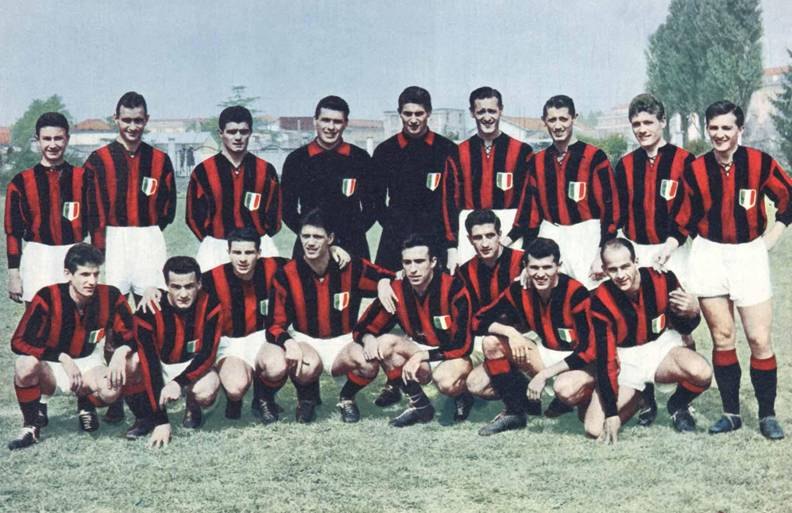
- Amos Mariani (crouched, third from left) with the AC Milan squad for the 1957–58 season

Personal information
- Date of birth: 30 March 1931
- Place of birth: Montecatini Terme, Italy
- Date of death: 20 February 2007 (aged 75)
- Place of death: Montecatini Terme, Italy
- Height: 1.75 m (5 ft 9 in)
- Position: Forward

Senior career*
Years	Team	Apps	(Gls)
1947–1949	Empoli	22	(1)
1949–1950	Juventus	1	(0)
1950–1951	Atalanta	26	(3)
1951–1952	Udinese	36	(1)
1952–1955	Fiorentina	85	(15)
1955–1958	Milan	82	(14)
1958–1959	Padova	31	(9)
1959–1961	Lazio	44	(2)
1961–1963	Napoli	29	(5)

International career
1952–1959	Italy	4	(2)

Managerial career
- 1970–1971: Pro Vercelli
- 1977–1978: Ethnikos Piraeus
- 1978: Kavala
- 1979–1980: Montecatini
- * Club domestic league appearances and goals

Amos Mariani (Italian pronunciation: [ˈaːmoz maˈrjaːni]; 30 March 1931 – 20 February 2007) was an Italian professional football player and coach, who played as a forward. As a player, he represented the Italy national football team at the 1952 Summer Olympics.

== Honours ==
=== Club ===
Juventus

- Serie A: 1949–50

Milan

- Serie A: 1956–57
- Latin Cup: 1956

Napoli

- Coppa Italia: 1961–62
