= Jeneč =

- Municipality
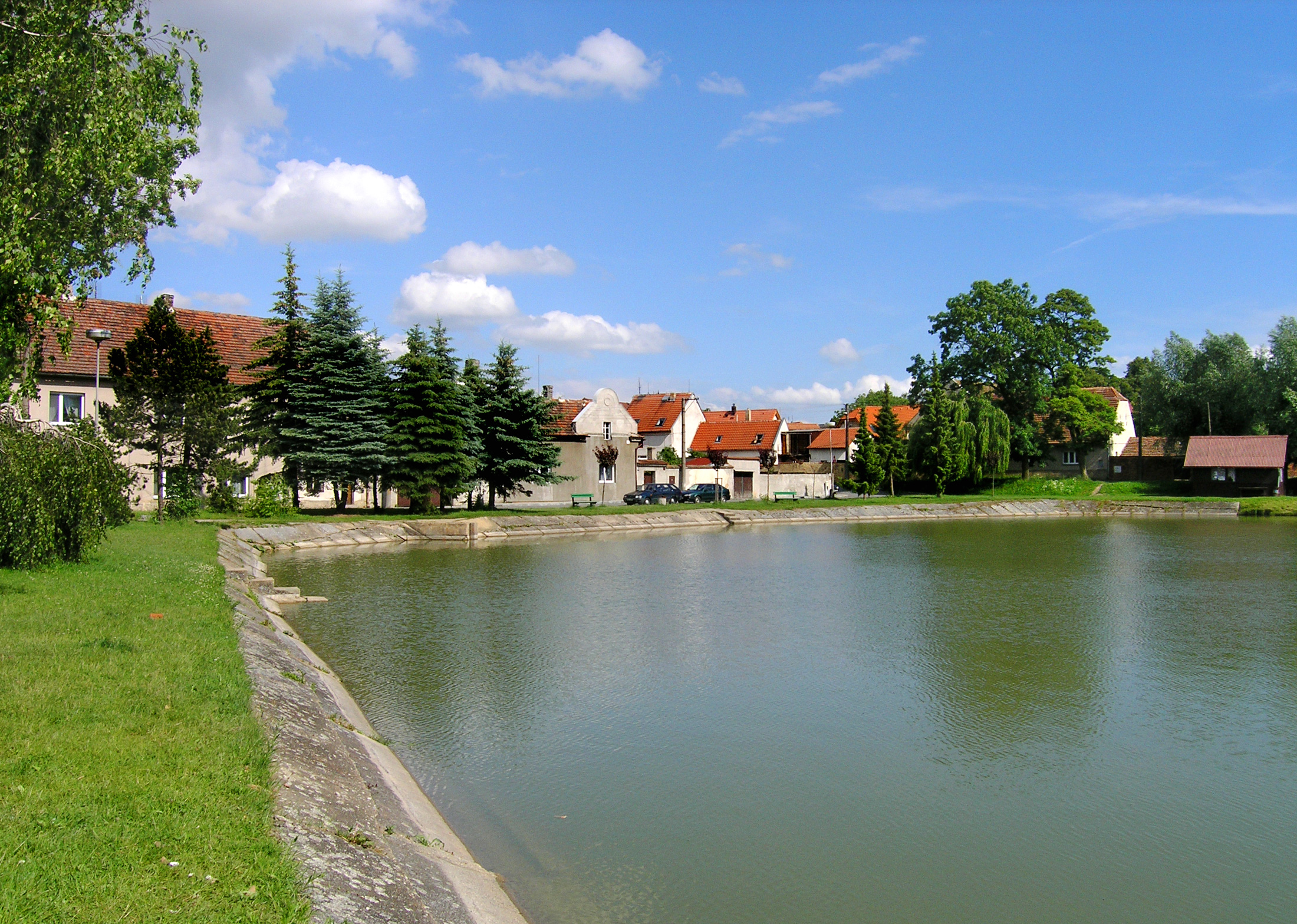
- Pond in the centre of Jeneč

- Flag Coat of arms

- Location in the Czech Republic
- Coordinates: 50°5′15″N 14°12′54″E
- Country: Czech Republic
- Region: Central Bohemian
- District: Prague-West
- First mentioned: 1239

Area
  - Total: 7.34 km^{2} (2.83 sq mi)
- Elevation: 363 m (1,191 ft)

Population (2026-01-01)
  - Total: 1,353
  - Density: 184/km^{2} (477/sq mi)
- Time zone: UTC+1 (CET)
  - Summer (DST): UTC+2 (CEST)
- Postal code: 252 61
- Website: www.jenec.cz

Jeneč is a municipality and village in Prague-West District in the Central Bohemian Region of the Czech Republic. It has about 1,400 inhabitants.

== Demographics ==
Historical population
Year	Pop.	±%
1869	753	—
1880	925	+22.8%
1890	1,053	+13.8%
1900	1,046	−0.7%
1910	1,024	−2.1%
1921	1,166	+13.9%
1930	1,498	+28.5%
1950	1,376	−8.1%
1961	1,350	−1.9%
1970	1,314	−2.7%
1980	1,178	−10.4%
1991	1,049	−11.0%
2001	1,061	+1.1%
2011	1,285	+21.1%
2021	1,350	+5.1%
Source: Censuses

== Notable people ==
- Jiří Tichý (1933–2016), footballer
