= Imrich Stacho =

Slovak footballer

Personal information
- Date of birth: 4 November 1931
- Place of birth: Trnava, Czechoslovakia
- Date of death: 10 January 2006 (aged 74)
- Position: Goalkeeper

Senior career*
Years	Team	Apps	(Gls)
1947–1966	Spartak Trnava	211	(10)
1953–1954	→ Tankista Prague		

International career
1953–1960	Czechoslovakia	23	(1)
- * Club domestic league appearances and goals

Imrich Stacho (4 November 1931, in Trnava – 10 January 2006) was a Slovak football goalkeeper. He played for Czechoslovakia national team in 23 matches and scored one goal from a penalty in a match against Ireland, which was the first ever international goal scored by a goalkeeper.

== Career ==
Stacho was chosen as one of Czechoslovakia's goalkeepers at the 1954 FIFA World Cup and 1958 FIFA World Cup.
On a club level he played for Spartak Trnava from 1947 until 1966. During his military service in Prague in the mid 1950s, he also played for Tankista Prague.

== International goals ==
No.	Date	Venue	Opponent	Score	Result	Competition
1	10 May 1959	Tehelné pole, Bratislava, Czechoslovakia	Republic of Ireland	1–0	4–0	1960 European Nations' Cup qualifying

Source: 11v11
