= Gunnar Andersson (footballer) =

Swedish footballer (1928-1969)

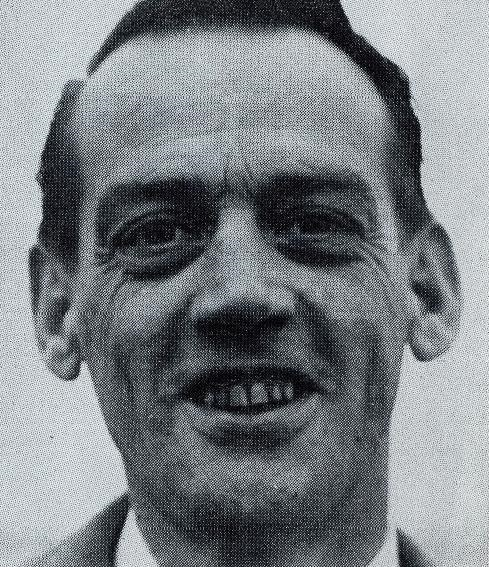
- Andersson in 1968

Personal information
- Full name: Karl Gunnar Andersson
- Date of birth: 14 August 1928
- Place of birth: Arvika, Sweden
- Date of death: 1 October 1969 (aged 41)
- Place of death: Marseille, France
- Height: 1.75 m (5 ft 9 in)
- Position: Striker

Youth career
- IFK Arvika
- 1943–49: IFK Åmål

Senior career*
| Years | Team | Apps | (Gls) |
| 1949–1950 | IFK Göteborg | 2 | (0) |
| 1950 | Kjøbenhavns Boldklub | | |
| 1950–1958 | Marseille | 220 | (169) |
| 1958 | SO Montpellier | | |
| 1958–1960 | Bordeaux | | |
| 1960–1961 | AS Aix | 28 | (10) |
| 1961–1962 | CAL Oran | | |
| 1962–1963 | AS Gignac | | |
| 1964 | IFK Arvika | | |

International career
| 1956 | France B | 1 | (0) |
- * Club domestic league appearances and goals

Karl Gunnar "Säffle" Andersson (14 August 1928 – 1 October 1969) was a Swedish footballer who played as a striker. He is widely considered one of Olympique de Marseille's best strikers, and is the highest scorer of the club. Born in Sweden, he played for the France national football B team once.

== Career ==
Andersson started his career in Sweden, where he was nicknamed Säffle, before playing for Danish side Kjøbenhavns BK before being transferred to Olympique de Marseille, where he became a key player. Having scored 194 goals in 220 matches, he is the highest scorer of the club ahead of Jean-Pierre Papin (182) and Josip Skoblar (176). With l'OM he was also Division 1 top goalscorer in 1951–1952 and 1952–1953 and runner-up in the 1953–54 Coupe de France. He also played for other French teams such as FC Girondins de Bordeaux and AS Aix.

Despite success in France, he never played for the Sweden national team because of a policy not to select players based outside Sweden, such as Andersson and Gunnar Nordahl. He obtained French nationality in 1954 and was capped once for the France B team in 1956.

He died in 1969 heading to Stade Vélodrome to see a match against Dukla Prague in the 1969–70 European Cup Winners' Cup.

== Honours ==
Marseille

- Coupe de France runner-up: 1954
- Coupe Charles Drago: 1957

Individual

- Division 1 top goalscorer: 1951–1952, 1952–1953
- Olympique de Marseille all-time top scorer: 194 goals
