= Poul Skytte Christoffersen =

Danish diplomat

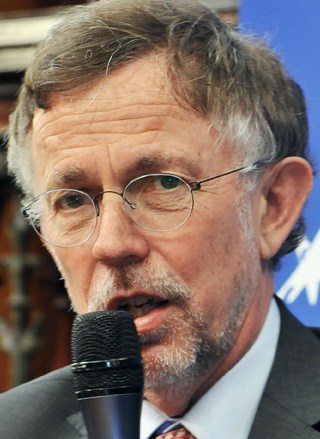
Poul Skytte Christoffersen

Poul Skytte Christoffersen (born 1946) is a Danish diplomat. He holds a degree in Economics. Christoffersen prepared the negotiations on EU enlargement to take in 10 central and eastern European countries in 2004, so that they could be concluded at the Copenhagen summit in December 2002. He was the Danish Ambassador to the European Union from 1995 -2003. He then was appointed ambassador to Italy. In 2009 he again became ambassador to the EU, a role which he gave up when becoming Special advisor to Baroness Catherine Ashton, High Representative of the Union for Foreign Affairs and Security Policy. He is to help Ashton set up the European External Action Service (EEAS).
