= Ernest Jann =

Luxembourgish footballer (1931–2023)

Personal information
- Date of birth: 3 October 1931
- Date of death: 30 June 2023 (aged 91)
- Position: Defensive midfielder

International career
| Years | Team | Apps | (Gls) |
| 1957–1961 | Luxembourg | 13 | (1) |

Ernest Jann (3 October 1931 – 30 June 2023) was a Luxembourgish footballer. He played in 13 matches for the Luxembourg national football team from 1957 to 1961.
