= Poul Sørensen =

Poul Sørensen may refer to:

- Poul Sørensen (cyclist) (1906-1951), Danish cyclist
- Poul Sørensen (handballer) (born 1954), Danish handball player
- Poul Sørensen (politician) (1904–1969), Danish politician
