= Ove Ødegaard =

Norwegian footballer (1931-1964)

Personal information
- Date of birth: 11 April 1931
- Place of birth: Norway
- Date of death: 15 November 1964 (aged 33)
- Position: Midfielder

Senior career*
| Years | Team | Apps | (Gls) |
| 1952–1956 | SK Snøgg | | |
| 1956–1961 | Odd | | |

International career
| 1952–1959 | Norway | 6 | (2) |
- * Club domestic league appearances and goals

Ove Ødegaard (11 April 1931 – 15 November 1964) was a Norwegian footballer.

He made his international debut for Norway on 10 June 1952, playing a 1–2 loss to neighbours Finland at the Bislett Stadium in Oslo. He was a standby player for their squad at the year's Olympics in Finland.

Ødegaard totalled six matches for Norway – one apiece in 1955 and 1958, and three in 1959. On 23 September 1959, at the Praterstadion in Vienna, he scored his only international goals in a 5–2 loss to Austria; Norway lost 6–2 on aggregate and failed to qualify for the 1960 European Nations' Cup.

At the club level, he spent most of his career with SK Snøgg. In 1958, he moved to Odds BK, where he lost in the cup final to Rosenborg BK in 1960.

He drowned age 33 in Brunlanes Municipality, when a wave struck him while fishing.
