= Gaston De Wael =

Belgian footballer

Personal information
- Full name: Gaston Marius De Wael
- Date of birth: 31 December 1934
- Place of birth: Anderlecht, Belgium
- Date of death: 6 March 2008 (aged 73)
- Position: Forward

International career
Years	Team	Apps	(Gls)
1956–1957	Belgium	2	(0)

Gaston De Wael (31 December 1934 – 6 March 2008) was a Belgian footballer. He played in two matches for the Belgium national football team from 1956 to 1957.
