= Povl Winning Toussieng =

- Born: 15 June 1892; Aalborg, Denmark
- Died: 11 January 1967 (aged 74); Copenhagen, Denmark
- Occupations: Doctor, writer and resistance fighter
- Writing career
- Language: Danish
- Genre: Travelogues

Povl Winning Toussieng (15 June 1892 – 11 January 1967) was a Danish doctor, author and resistance fighter.

== Background and education ==
Povl Winning Toussieng was son of colonel Heinrich Elfred Theodor Toussieng (1845–1908) and Regina Frederikke Winning (1859–1938). Povl Winning Toussieng attended Rungsted Boarding School in Rungsted, Denmark. He went on to study medicine at the University of Copenhagen. After having graduated in 1917, he became a general practitioner (GP) in Nysted, Denmark. Toussieng married Ingeborg Marie Amalie Hansen, and they had two children: Povl Winning Toussieng Junior (5 September 1918 – 17 November 1997) who became a child psychiatrist in Oklahoma City and Agnete Toussieng (25 June 1921 – 31 May 2006).

== Stationing in the Dutch East Indies ==
Toussieng met Queen Juliana of the Netherlands at the Dutch embassy in Copenhagen, and she encouraged him to go to the Dutch East Indies. Toussieng left Denmark for the Dutch East Indies in 1922 on a three-year contract with the Dutch Government. He was stationed in Borneo from 1922 to 1925, whereafter Toussieng continued working as a GP in the eastern part of Java – in Malang until 1937. While he worked as a GP he also worked as a doctor for the Pasoeroean sugartesting station.

=== Travelogues ===
In 1937 Toussieng returned to Denmark, and became a GP in Charlottenlund in 1938.

He wrote two books about his experiences in the jungles of the Dutch East Indies: Mahakam: Den store flod (Mahakam: The big river) and Mahakam, ovenfor Faldene (Mahakam, above the falls). Both books were published in 1941.

=== Collection of cultural objects ===
Toussieng was given a large number of masks, swords, spears and cultural objects from his grateful patients in the Dutch East Indies. Toussiengs descendants have donated a large number of these objects to the National Museum of Denmark. One of the objects – a mask – has since been portrayed on a Danish stamp.

== Resistance fight ==
Toussieng was active in 1st Company of the Danish Home Guard, and he hid resistance fighters during the German occupation of Denmark during the Second World War. Toussieng was together with his son arrested on 2 December 1944. They were questioned and interned for a period of time before they were released.

Toussieng also worked to improve the conditions of refugees from the Netherlands, and after the war, he was awarded the Dutch Red Cross medal and appointed an officer of the Dutch Order of Orange-Nassau.
