= Dick Whittaker =

Irish footballer

Richard Whittaker (10 October 1934 in Dublin – 1998) was an Irish professional football player.

He was a right back who joined Chelsea in London in 1952, as a professional having played for Chelsea youth team, from St. Mary's B.C.

He played 48 times for Chelsea before moving to Peterborough United in June 1960 and from there to Queens Park Rangers.

He won his one and only cap for the Republic of Ireland national football team on 10 May 1959 in a 4–0 defeat to Czechoslovakia in Bratislava. Also won a Republic of Ireland B cap against Romania in 1957.
