= Poul Bassett =

Canadian soccer player (born 1928)

Paul Kurt "Poul" Bassett (born December 17, 1928) is a Canadian retired soccer player who played as a forward. He had a long career in Denmark, playing for Odense Boldklub and Boldklubben 1909. (Note: Poul Bassett at WorldFootball.net) He was born in Saskatchewan.
