= Jiří Tichý =

Czech footballer (1933–2016)

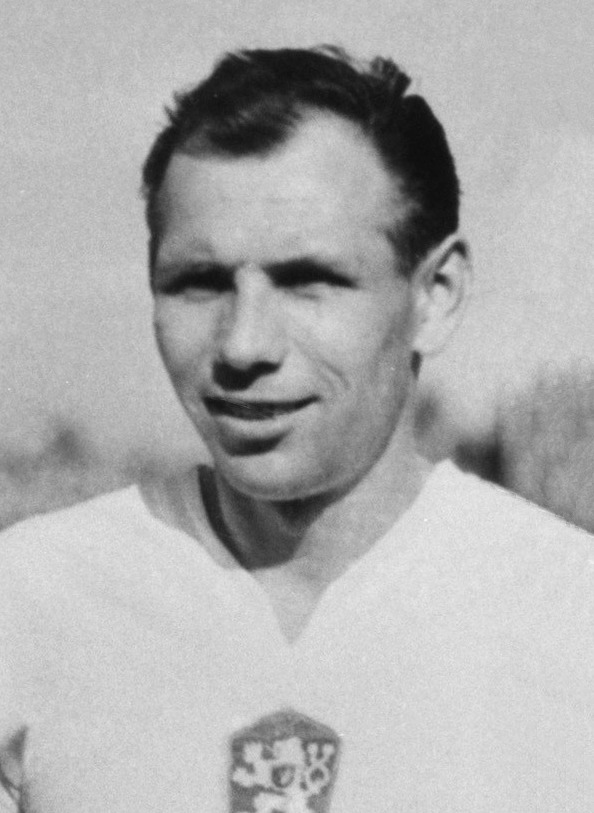
- Tichý in 1962

Personal information
- Date of birth: 6 December 1933
- Place of birth: Jeneč, Czechoslovakia
- Date of death: 26 August 2016 (aged 82)
- Place of death: Podivín, Czech Republic
- Height: 1.78 m (5 ft 10 in)
- Position: Defender

Senior career*
Years	Team	Apps	(Gls)
1954–1963	CH Bratislava	256	(21)
1963–1969	Sparta Prague		

International career
1957–1964	Czechoslovakia	19	(0)
Medal record
Men's football
Representing Czechoslovakia
FIFA World Cup
Runner-up	1962 Chile
- * Club domestic league appearances and goals

Jiří Tichý (6 December 1933 – 26 August 2016) was a Czech football player.

During his club career he played for CH Bratislava and Sparta Prague. Tichý won three championship titles with Sparta. He earned 19 caps for the Czechoslovakia national football team, and was part of the second-placed team at the 1962 FIFA World Cup.
