= François Milazzo =

French footballer (1934–1967)

Personal information
- Date of birth: 9 February 1934
- Place of birth: Meknes, French Morocco
- Date of death: 12 January 1967 (aged 32)
- Place of death: Marseille, France
- Height: 1.78 m (5 ft 10 in)
- Position: Attacking midfielder

Senior career*
Years	Team	Apps	(Gls)
1948–1954	USD Meknès		
1954–1960	Nice	166	(28)
1960–1964	Marseille	108	(23)
1964–1966	Gazélec Ajaccio		
- * Club domestic league appearances and goals

François Milazzo (9 February 1934 – 12 January 1967) was a French footballer who played as an attacking midfielder.

== Career ==
Milazzo began his career in French Morocco at USD Meknès, before joining Nice in 1954. At Nice, he scored a total of 38 goals in 194 matches between 1954 and 1960, helping the club win two French Division 1 titles and reach the final of the 1958 Coupe Charles Drago. In 1960, he signed for Division 2 side Marseille, where he made primarily played in Division 2, before joining Gazélec Ajaccio in 1964 after failing a physiotherapy test at Marseille. With Gazélec Ajaccio, he won two Championnat de France Amateur titles.

== Personal life and death ==
During his career, Milazzo gained the nickname 'Fanfan'.

Milazzo suffered from porphyria, and died from the disease in Marseille on 12 January 1967, at the age of 32. Around 10,000 people attended his funeral.

== Honours ==
Nice

- French Division 1: 1955–56, 1958–59
- Coupe Charles Drago runner-up: 1958

Gazélec Ajaccio

- Championnat de France Amateur: 1964–65, 1965–66
