= Horst Kohle =

East German footballer (1935–2015)

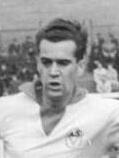
- Kohle in 1959

Personal information
- Full name: Horst Otto Kohle
- Date of birth: 7 October 1935
- Date of death: 20 January 2015 (aged 79)
- Position: Forward

Senior career*
Years	Team	Apps	(Gls)
–1954	Motor Schönebeck		
1954–1955	SC DHfK Leipzig	10	(10)
1955–1964	ASK Vorwärts Berlin	138	(41)

International career
1959	East Germany	1	(1)
- * Club domestic league appearances and goals

Horst Otto Kohle (7 October 1935 – 20 January 2015) was an East German footballer who played as a forward.

== Career ==
=== Club career ===
Kohle scored the first ever goal in the European Cup Winners' Cup, when he scored after 42 minutes during ASK Vorwärts Berlin's 2–1 win against Rudá Hvězda Brno on 1 August 1960.

=== International career ===
Kohle made one appearance for the East Germany national team on 28 June 1959, where he scored in a 3–2 loss to Portugal during 1960 European Nations' Cup qualifying.

== Career statistics ==
Appearances and goals by national team and year
National team	Year	Apps	Goals
East Germany	1959	1	1
Total		1	1

Scores and results list East Germany's goal tally first.

List of international goals scored by Horst Kohle
No.	Date	Venue	Opponent	Score	Result	Competition
1	28 June 1959	Estádio das Antas, Porto, Portugal	Portugal	2–3	2–3	1960 European Nations' Cup qualifying

== Honours ==
- DDR-Oberliga: 1958, 1960, 1961–62
