= Luis Carniglia =

Argentine footballer and manager

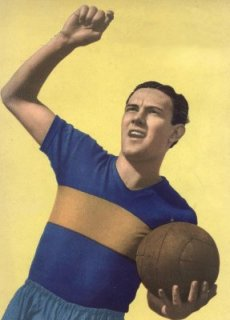

Personal information
- Full name: Luis Antonio Carniglia
- Date of birth: 4 October 1917
- Place of birth: Olivos, Argentina
- Date of death: 22 June 2001 (aged 83)
- Place of death: Buenos Aires, Argentina
- Position: Striker

Youth career
- 1932–1933: Club de Olivos

Senior career*
Years	Team	Apps	(Gls)
1933–1936	Tigre	?	(?)
1936–1941	Boca Juniors	54	(17)
1942–1945	Chacarita	14	(3)
1945–1948	Atlas		
1951–1952	Nice	10	(1)
1952–1953	Toulon	26	(4)
1953–1955	Nice	8	(0)

Managerial career
- 1955–1957: Nice
- 1957–1959: Real Madrid
- 1959: Real Madrid
- 1959–1960: Fiorentina
- 1961: Bari
- 1961–1963: Roma
- 1963–1964: Milan
- 1964–1965: Deportivo La Coruña
- 1965–1968: Bologna
- 1969–1970: Juventus
- 1973: San Lorenzo
- 1978–1979: Bordeaux
- * Club domestic league appearances and goals as of June 2007

Luis Antonio Carniglia (4 October 1917 – 22 June 2001) was an Argentine football striker and manager. He played for Boca Juniors in the 1930s, but is probably best known for managing Real Madrid in the 1950s. Luis Carniglia was buried in La Recoleta Cemetery in Buenos Aires.

== Playing career ==
Born in Olivos, Carniglia began his career in the fourth division club Club de Olivos, in 1932. He remained there for one season before joining Tigre, but this was only a stepping stone on his way to completing his childhood dream of playing for Boca Juniors, whom he signed for in 1936. His debut, for Boca, was in a friendly played in Parana and was quite a spectacle. Carniglia had a goal within 3 minutes and a fractured left arm by the fifth minute. Boca went on to win the game 3–0. He was part of the Boca side that won the 1940 Argentine First Division and the Copa Dr. Carlos Ibarguren.

1941 was a turn for the worse in his professional career, in a game against San Lorenzo, Carniglia broke his leg. The recovery took three years which he spent at Chacarita Juniors and Atlas, though he was never the same player again. He prolonged his career by playing in the French Ligue 1 and Ligue 2 with Toulon and Nice, transitioning into the role of manager with Nice. That is not to say that his final years as a player were entirely fruitless, he won the Ligue 1 title and a Coupe de France in 1952, and the Coupe de France again in 1954, all with Nice.

== Managerial career ==
Following his return to Nice in 1953, Carniglia played two more seasons before retiring as a player and taking over the reins as the new Nice manager, from the British manager George Berry. He had immediate success winning the Ligue 1 title with Nice in his first year. The following season, 1956–57, saw Nice finish 13th in Ligue 1. Carniglia then left to take over the Spanish giants Real Madrid. Nice replaced him with the French coach Jean Luciano.

Carniglia was Real Madrid head coach from June 1957 to July 1959 with a two-month stop from February 1959 due to a renal colic. Madrid, at the time, had some of the greatest footballing talent in the world with Alfredo di Stéfano (holder of the Ballon d'Or at the time), Francisco Gento, Raymond Kopa and Héctor Rial. These greats were joined in 1957 by José Santamaría and Ferenc Puskás in 1958. Carniglia did not have a high opinion of Puskás when he arrived, as he had not played professionally in over a year and was considerably over weight. Carniglia whipped him into shape with Puskás losing 15 kg before his first La Liga game against Oviedo. Carniglia left Puskás out of the 1959 European cup final, which led to his being sacked by Santiago Bernabéu, the chairman of Real. Carniglia's time with Real was the most fruitful in his management career, winning the European Cup twice, in 1958 with a 3–2 win over A.C. Milan and in 1959 with a 2–0 win over Reims. He also won the La Liga title in 1958.

Carniglia had short spells at Fiorentina and Bari before joining Roma in 1961. With Roma, he won the 1961 Fairs Cup. Following his mid season departure from Roma in 1963, apparently due to arguments with the club directors, he took over at A.C. Milan, the team he had beaten in the 1958 European Cup Final. Milan were the reigning European Cup holders and competed in the Intercontinental Cup. They played the Brazilian side Santos featuring Pelé at the height of his prowess in the final 1963 final. Milan won the opening game 4 – 2 in Milan, Pelé scoring both goals for Santos. Before the second leg rumors began to circulate that the Argentinian referee had been bribed, Milan tried to have match official changed but were barred from doing so. Santos won the second game 4 – 2, without Pelé who was injured. With the two leg final a stalemate, a third decisive play-off game took place in Santos just 48 hours after the second leg. The same match official was used for the playoff game. In the third minute, of the playoff, Giovanni Trapattoni was adjudged to have fouled a player in the box and Santos had a penalty, which they duly converted. Cesare Maldini protested and was sent off. Santos won the fixture 1 – 0.

Following his retirement as a coach Carniglia had a spell as General Manager of Boca Juniors with Silvio Marzolini as the coach. He was the first president of FAA (Futbolistas Argentinos Agremiados), his home country's footballers union.

== Personal life ==
His son Luis César Carniglia was also a footballer. He spent his entire career in Italy playing some Serie A matches before lowering to amateurs leagues. Lot of media and references mistakenly consider father and sons to be the same person.

== Honours ==
=== Manager ===
Nice

- Ligue 1: 1955–56

Real Madrid

- La Liga: 1957–58
- European Cup: 1957–58, 1958–59

Roma

- Inter-Cities Fairs Cup: 1960–61

== See also ==
- List of European Cup and UEFA Champions League winning managers
