= Gilbert Bonvin =

French footballer (1931-1983)

Personal information
- Date of birth: 13 February 1931
- Place of birth: Annecy, France
- Date of death: 20 July 1983 (aged 52)
- Position: Defender

Senior career*
Years	Team	Apps	(Gls)
1951–1955	Olympique Lyonnais	142	(3)
1955–1957	OGC Nice	71	(0)
1957	Grenoble Foot 38	9	(1)
1957–1963	RC Lens	68	(1)
- * Club domestic league appearances and goals

Gilbert Bonvin (13 February 1931 – 20 July 1983) was a French football player.

== Honours ==
- French Division 1 winner 1956
- French Division 2 winner 1954
- Coupe Charles Drago winner (2) 1959, 1960
