= John Kramer (footballer) =

Danish footballer and manager (1934–1994)

Personal information
- Full name: John Friberg Kramer
- Date of birth: 17 November 1934
- Place of birth: Ringsted, Denmark
- Date of death: 13 July 1994 (aged 59)
- Place of death: Fårevejle, Denmark
- Position: Midfielder

Youth career
- Ringsted IF

Senior career*
Years	Team	Apps	(Gls)
1953–1957	Køge BK	76	
1957–1959	GIF Sundsvall	approx. 36	
1959–1965	B.1901 Nykøbing	149	

International career
1959	Denmark	4	(2)
- * Club domestic league appearances and goals

John Friberg Kramer (17 November 1934 – 13 July 1994) was a Danish footballer and manager who played as a midfielder. He made four appearances for the Denmark national team in 1959, and played for Danish clubs Køge Boldklub and B.1901 Nykøbing, and the Swedish club GIF Sundsvall. Following his playing career, he became a manager.

== Early years ==
Kramer was born on 17 November 1934 in Ringsted, Denmark. He grew up in Ringsted playing for Ringsted IF, a multi-sport club where he excelled as a standout talent in both football and handball. After making 24 appearances for Ringsted's first team as a youth player, Kramer committed exclusively to football. He stayed when he was about 8 before leaving in 1952 at 18 to join Køge Boldklub, believing Ringsted was too small for him.

== Club career ==
=== Køge Boldklub ===
After leaving Ringsted, Kramer joined Køge Boldklub, where he had 76 appearances. He helped accompany them on a football tour across the world, where he played 9 matches in Cyprus, Vietnam, and Hong Kong. In 1954, he won the Danish Championship with Køge BK. He left the club after receiving an offer from the Swedish club GIF Sundsvall.

=== GIF Sundsvall ===
Kramer played approximately 36 games for GIF Sundsvall, a club he described as an "elevator team" as it had frequently alternated between the first and second division during that era. He represented the Mid-Sweden district team in six matches.

=== B.1901 Nykøbing ===
Kramer was a part of B.1901 Nykøbing's "Second Golden Age". He joined the club in early 1959 after returning from Sweden, where he had to sit out for a 6-month quarantine period due to his previous professional status abroad. He went on to make 149 appearances for the first team.

While living and playing in Nykøbing Falster, he also ran a local business known as Kramers Kiosk.

== International career ==
Kramer made eleven appearances for the Denmark national under-21 team, where he scored one goal. He scored two goals in four appearances for both the Denmark national first team and the Denmark national second team. Three of these appearances were in international friendlies and 1 in the UEFA EURO Qualifiers. Kramer's status as a paid player in Sweden later impacted his amateur standing when he returned to Denmark, ultimately ruling him out of the 1960 Olympic squad.

== Managerial career ==
Following his playing career, Kramer moved to Sweden in 1965 to study coaching, physiotherapy, and sports psychology. At IF Heimer, Kramer served as player-coach for 3 seasons with 58 matches, while focusing on physical therapy and fitness training. At IFK Vänersborg, Kramer served as player-coach for 2 seasons with 36 matches. In January 1971, he was appointed head coach of Boldklubben Frem on a two-year contract. He led the team to a 3rd-place finish in the 1st Division in 1971 and managed their pre-season tour of Asia.

In 1980, he took over as manager of Kjøbenhavns Boldklub. He led the team to the Danish Championship in his debut season. However, following a poor start to the 1982 season, he was sacked after 18 rounds with the club sitting at the bottom of the table.

Kramer managed the Faroese club B68 Toftir in from 1984 to 1986 and 1988 to 1989. He also managed another Faroese club, Klaksvíkar Ítróttarfelag in 1990.

== Later years ==
Kramer died on 13 July 1994 at the age of 59 in Fårevejle.
