= Lazar Tasić =

Serbian footballer

Personal information
- Date of birth: 5 April 1931
- Place of birth: Belgrade, Kingdom of Yugoslavia
- Date of death: 16 May 2003 (aged 72)
- Position: Midfielder

Senior career*
Years	Team	Apps	(Gls)
1948–1954	Metalac/BSK Beograd	70	(3)
1954–1961	Red Star Belgrade	143	(17)
1962–1964	US Boulogne	75	(14)
1964–1966	1. FC Saarbrücken	41	(2)
1966–1967	Čelik Zenica	7	(0)

International career
1952–1960	Yugoslavia	13	(1)

Managerial career
- 1970: Vefa
- * Club domestic league appearances and goals

Lazar Tasić (Serbian Cyrillic: Лазар Тасић; 5 April 1931 – 16 May 2003) was a Serbian football player.

He played 13 matches for the Yugoslavia national team scoring once, his final international was a January 1960 friendly match against Egypt.

He managed Turkish top-tier outfit Vefa in 1970.
