= Bernard Rahis =

French footballer (1933–2008)

Personal information
- Date of birth: 12 February 1933
- Place of birth: Blida, French Algeria
- Date of death: 16 March 2008 (aged 75)
- Place of death: Corsica, France
- Position: Striker

Senior career*
Years	Team	Apps	(Gls)
1954–1963	Nîmes	241	(102)
1963–1964	Servette	12	(9)
1964–1965	Lille	7	(4)
1965–1966	Annecy		

International career
1959–1961	France	3	(1)
- * Club domestic league appearances and goals

Bernard Rahis (12 February 1933 – 16 March 2008) was a French footballer who played as a striker for Nîmes.
