= Rudolf Pichler =

Austrian footballer

Personal information
- Date of birth: 20 September 1930
- Place of birth: Austria
- Date of death: 25 July 2011 (aged 80)
- Position: Forward

Senior career*
Years	Team	Apps	(Gls)
1949–1950	1. Wiener Neustädter SC	11	(5)
1950–1957	FK Austria Wien	96	(75)
1957–1962	1. Wiener Neustädter SC	71	(37)
1962–1963	SV Austria Salzburg	21	(6)

International career
1955–1960	Austria	3	(1)
- * Club domestic league appearances and goals

Rudolf Pichler (20 September 1930 – 25 July 2011) was an Austrian football forward who played for Austria in the 1960 European Nations' Cup. He also played for 1. Wiener Neustädter SC, FK Austria Wien and SV Austria Salzburg.
