= Guy Poitevin =

French footballer and manager (1927-2008)

Personal information
- Date of birth: 19 October 1927
- Place of birth: Entrains-sur-Nohain, Nièvre, France
- Date of death: 2 December 2008 (aged 81)
- Height: 1.81 m (5 ft 11 1/2 in)
- Position: Defender

Senior career*
Years	Team	Apps	(Gls)
1949–1951	Lille		
1951–1956	Nice		

Managerial career
- 1962–1963: Lille
- * Club domestic league appearances and goals

Guy Poitevin (born 19 October 1927 in Entrains-sur-Nohain (Nièvre), died 2 December 2008) was a French footballer and manager.

A defender, he played for Lille, before a brilliant career at Nice. With the aiglons, he won the Cup-League double in 1952, won the Cup again in 1954 and the Championship again in 1956.

== Honours ==
- French Champion 1952 and 1956 with OGC Nice
- League runner-up 1950 and 1951 with Lille OSC
- Winner of the Coupe de France 1952 and 1954 with OGC Nice
- 1951 Latin Cup runner-up with Lille OSC
