= Stéphane Bruey =

French footballer (1932-2005)

Personal information
- Full name: Stéphane Bruey
- Date of birth: 1 December 1932
- Place of birth: Champigny-sur-Marne, France
- Date of death: 30 August 2005 (aged 72)
- Position: Striker

Senior career*
Years	Team	Apps	(Gls)
1952–1955	RC Paris	44	(11)
1955–1957	Monaco	81	(25)
1957–1964	Angers	254	(93)
1964–1966	Lyon	44	(10)
Total		423	(139)

International career
1957–1962	France	4	(1)
Medal record
Representing France
FIFA World Cup
Third place	1958 Sweden
- * Club domestic league appearances and goals

Stéphane Bruey (1 December 1932 – 30 August 2005) was a French professional footballer who played as a striker. He was part of the France squad during the 1958 World Cup tournament.

== Honours ==
- 1958 FIFA World Cup third place with France
