= Karl Skerlan =

Austrian footballer

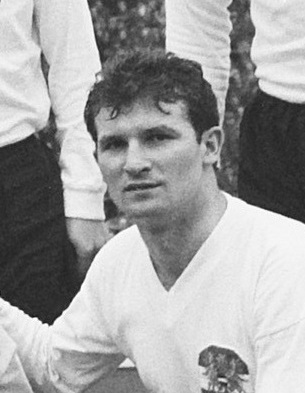
- Karl Skerlan in 1964.

Personal information
- Date of birth: 3 January 1940
- Place of birth: Austria
- Date of death: 7 February 2017 (aged 77)
- Position: Forward

Senior career*
Years	Team	Apps	(Gls)
–1957	SC Kittsee		
1957–1961	Wiener Sport-Club	97	(38)
1961–1967	Admira Energie Wien	101	(37)
1967–1968	FK Pirmasens		
1968–1971	SW Bregenz		
1982–1983	FC Höchst		

International career
1958–1964	Austria	14	(2)
- * Club domestic league appearances and goals

Karl Skerlan (3 January 1940 – 7 February 2017) was an Austrian football player, playing for Austria between 1958 and 1964. He also played for club teams including Wiener Sport-Club, Admira Energie Wien, FK Pirmasens, FC Höchst, SC Kittsee and SW Bregenz.

== Team management ==
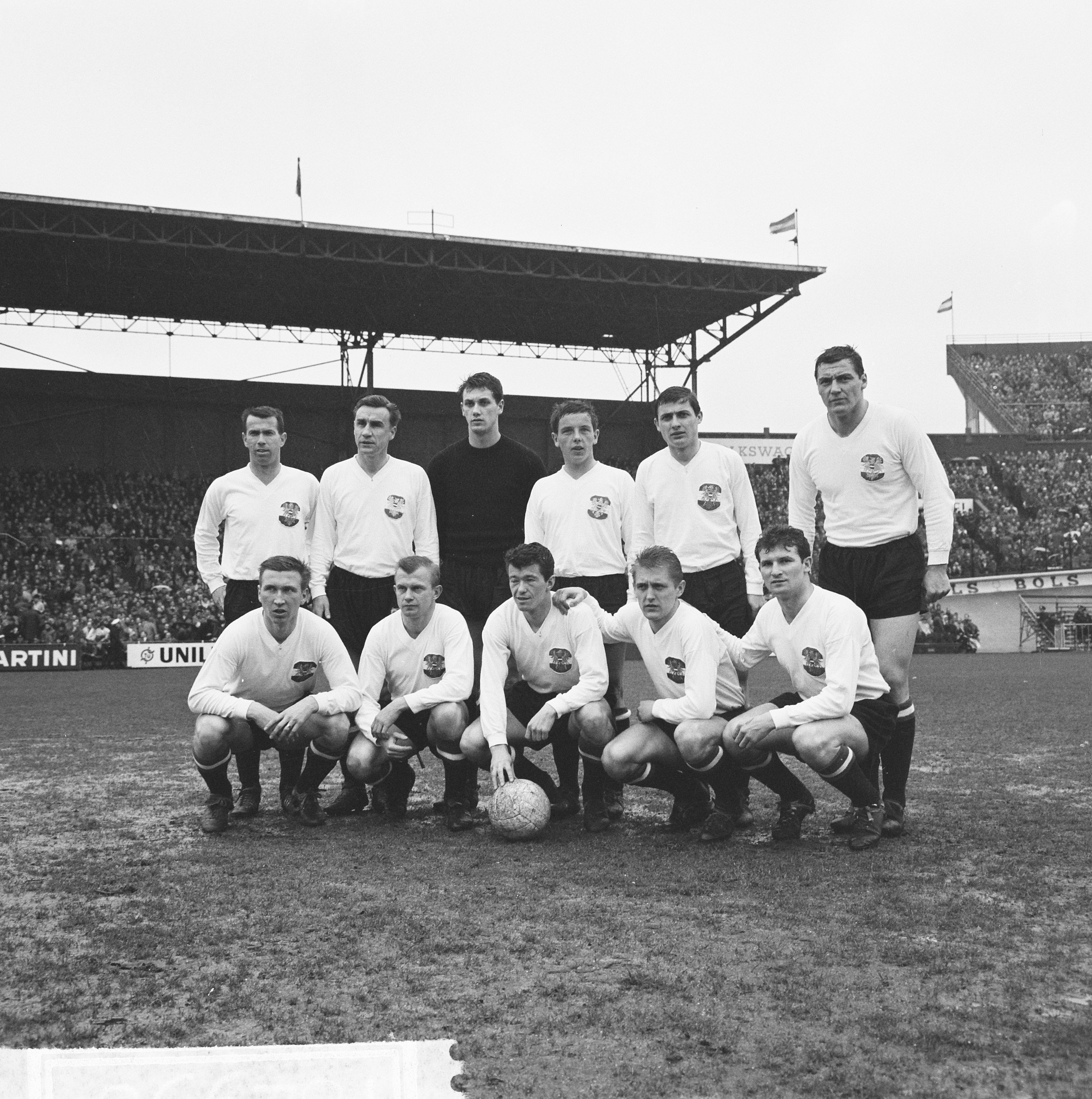
Skerlan is the player crouching on the lower right of the image.

Skerlan managed FC Vorarlberg (FC Rätia Bludenz) between Dec 1, 1973 and Jun 30, 1975. He managed the team for 576 days, running a W/D/L of 2/1/4. He used 28 players during his time managing the team. This was the only management he performed during his career.
