= Victor Nurenberg =

Luxembourgish footballer

Vic Nurenberg
Personal information
- Full name: Victor Nurenberg
- Date of birth: 22 November 1930
- Place of birth: Niederkorn, Esch-sur-Alzette, Luxembourg
- Date of death: 22 April 2010 (aged 79)
- Place of death: Nice, France
- Height: 1.77 m (5 ft 10 in)
- Position: Striker

Senior career*
Years	Team	Apps	(Gls)
1946–1951	Progrès Niedercorn		
1951–1960	Nice	252	(89)
1960–1962	Sochaux	66	(20)
1962–1963	Lyon	20	(5)
1963	Nice	0	(0)
1963–1964	Bastia		
1964–1966	Spora Luxembourg		
1966–1967	Mantes la Jolie		
Total		338	(114)

International career
1951–1964	Luxembourg	5	(1)

Managerial career
- 1964–1966: Spora Luxembourg
- 1966–1967: Mantes la Jolie
- * Club domestic league appearances and goals

Victor Nurenberg (22 November 1930 – 22 April 2010) was a Luxembourgish professional footballer. Nurenberg played in France for 13 seasons, representing four clubs. He also represented the Luxembourg national football team.

== Club career ==
Born in Niederkorn, Nurenberg started his career at local team Progrès Niedercorn aged 16 while he was working at a local factory and moved abroad to play for 13 years in France with OGC Nice, FC Sochaux, Olympique Lyonnais and SC Bastia.

With Nice he won the French league title three times and the domestic cup twice. He scored in both cup final wins. His moment of fame came in February 1960 when he scored a hat-trick for Nice in the UEFA Champions Cup quarter finals against Real Madrid, who would later lift the cup for a 5th successive time.

He returned to Luxembourg in 1964 to become player/coach at Spora Luxembourg and won the domestic cup with them twice.

== International career ==
Nurenberg made his debut for Luxembourg in 1951 against Belgium B and went on to earn 16 caps, including non-official matches. He played in three FIFA World Cup qualification matches and 2 games at the 1952 Olympic Games.

He played his final international game in September 1964 against Yugoslavia.

== Personal life and death ==
After retiring from football, Nurenberg worked at a casino in Nice and later opened a bar there. He lived in Saint-Laurent-du-Var, a Nice suburb, with his wife of over 50 years, Paulette Pieri. In 2008, he was promoted to the rank of Chevalier in the Order of Merit of the Grand Duchy of Luxembourg. He died on 22 April 2010, aged 79.

== Honours ==
Nice

- French League: 1952, 1956, 1959
- French Cup: 1952, 1954

Spora Luxembourg

- Luxembourg Cup: 1965, 1966
