= Titus Buberník =

Slovak footballer (1933–2022)

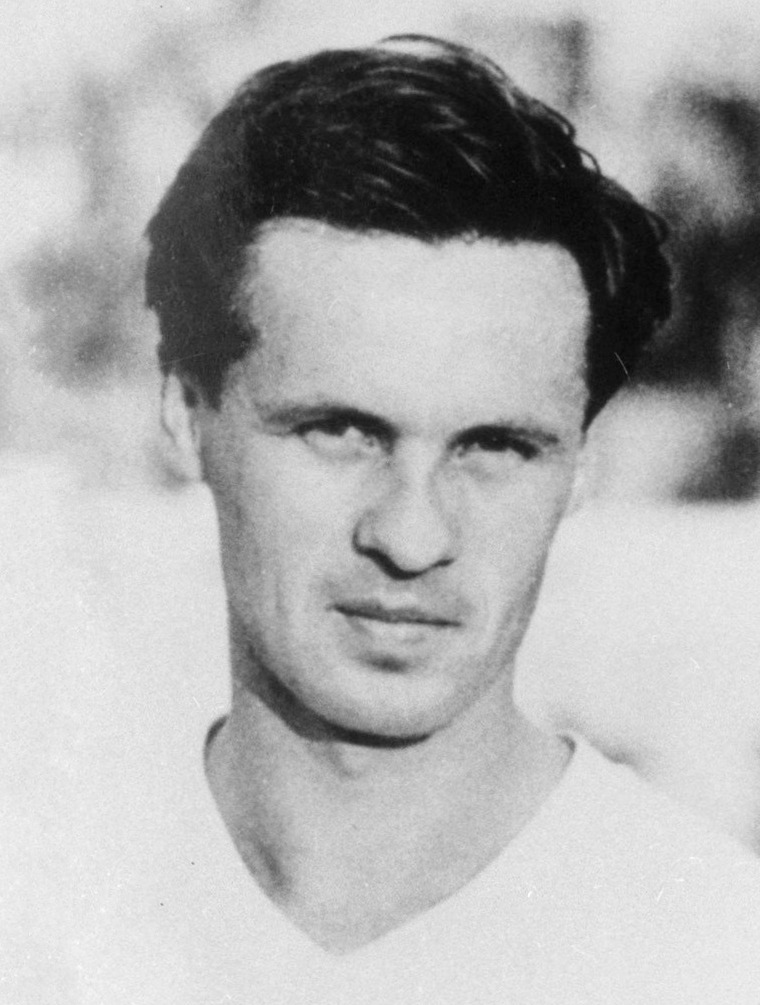
- Buberník in 1962

Personal information
- Date of birth: 12 October 1933
- Place of birth: Pusté Úľany, Czechoslovakia
- Date of death: 27 March 2022 (aged 88)
- Place of death: Bratislava, Slovakia
- Height: 1.78 m (5 ft 10 in)
- Position: Midfielder

Youth career
- 1946–1951: Slovan Bratislava

Senior career*
Years	Team	Apps	(Gls)
1953–1956	VSS Košice		
1956–1968	ČH Bratislava		
1968–1970	LASK Linz	36	(7)

International career
1958–1963	Czechoslovakia	23	(5)
Medal record
Men's football
Representing Czechoslovakia
FIFA World Cup
Runner-up	1962 Chile
- * Club domestic league appearances and goals

Titus Buberník (12 October 1933 – 27 March 2022) was a Slovak footballer who played as a midfielder. He played for the Czechoslovakia national team in 23 matches scoring five goals.

Buberník was born in Bratislava and grew up in Pusté Úľany. He participated in the 1958 FIFA World Cup and 1962 FIFA World Cup tournaments, the latter of where Czechoslovakia won the silver medal, but he did not play in the tournament.

At club level, Buberník played for VSS Košice in 1956 before moving to CH Bratislava, where he stayed for 12 years – winning the 1958–59 Czechoslovak First League during this time. Buberník died on 27 March 2022.

== Honours ==
CH Bratislava

- Czechoslovak First League: 1958–59
