= Ladislav Kačáni =

Slovak footballer (1931–2018)

Personal information
- Date of birth: 1 April 1931
- Place of birth: Lučenec, Czechoslovakia
- Date of death: 5 February 2018 (aged 86)
- Place of death: Bratislava, Slovakia
- Position: Striker

Senior career*
Years	Team	Apps	(Gls)
1952–1953	Slávia Bratislava		
1953–1962	CH Bratislava		
1963–1965	Inter Bratislava		

International career
1953–1962	Czechoslovakia	20	(3)

Managerial career
- 1967–1970: Inter Bratislava
- 1971–1972: Czechoslovakia
- 1972–1974: Lokomotíva Košice
- * Club domestic league appearances and goals

Ladislav Kačáni (1 April 1931 – 5 February 2018) was a Slovak football player. He played for Czechoslovakia national team in 20 matches and scored three goals.

He was a participant at the 1954 FIFA World Cup, where he played in two matches.

Kačáni played mostly for Inter Bratislava. He later began coaching career and led Inter Bratislava and, together with Ladislav Novák, Czechoslovakia national team.
