= Milan Dolinský =

Slovak footballer

Personal information
- Full name: Milan Dolinský
- Date of birth: 17 April 1935 (age 91)
- Place of birth: Brunovce, Czechoslovak Republic
- Position: Forward

Senior career*
Years	Team	Apps	(Gls)
1953	Lokomotíva Košice		
1953–1954	ÚNV Slovan Bratislava		
1954–1955	Tankista Prague		
1956–1966	TJ Červená Hviezda Bratislava		

International career
1959–1960	Czechoslovakia	10	(5)
1957	Czechoslovakia B	2	(0)
1959–1963	Czechoslovakia Olympic	3	(0)
- * Club domestic league appearances and goals

Milan Dolinský (born 17 April 1935) is a former Slovak footballer. He played for CH Bratislava where he earned 10 caps and scored 5 goals for the Czechoslovakia national football team from 1959 to 1960, and participated in the 1960 European Nations' Cup of which he is the last surviving Czechoslovakia player

== Honours ==
=== Clubs ===
TJ Červená Hviezda Bratislava

- Czechoslovak First League: 1958–59
- International Football Cup: 1962–63, 1963–64
- Mitropa Cup: 1968–69
