= UEFA Euro 1968 qualifying =

Tournament details
- Dates: 7 September 1966 – 11 May 1968
- Teams: 31

Tournament statistics
- Matches played: 98 (Note: The matches/goals tally takes into account fixtures that were subsequently annulled.)
- Goals scored: 306 (3.12 per match)
- Top scorer(s): (Hungary) János Farkas (Italy) Gigi Riva (6 goals each)

The qualifying round for the 1968 UEFA European Championship consisted of 31 teams divided into eight groups; seven of four teams and one of three teams. Each group winner progressed to the quarter-finals. The quarter-finals were played in two legs on a home-and-away basis. The winners of the quarter-finals would go through, to the final tournament.

== Qualified teams ==
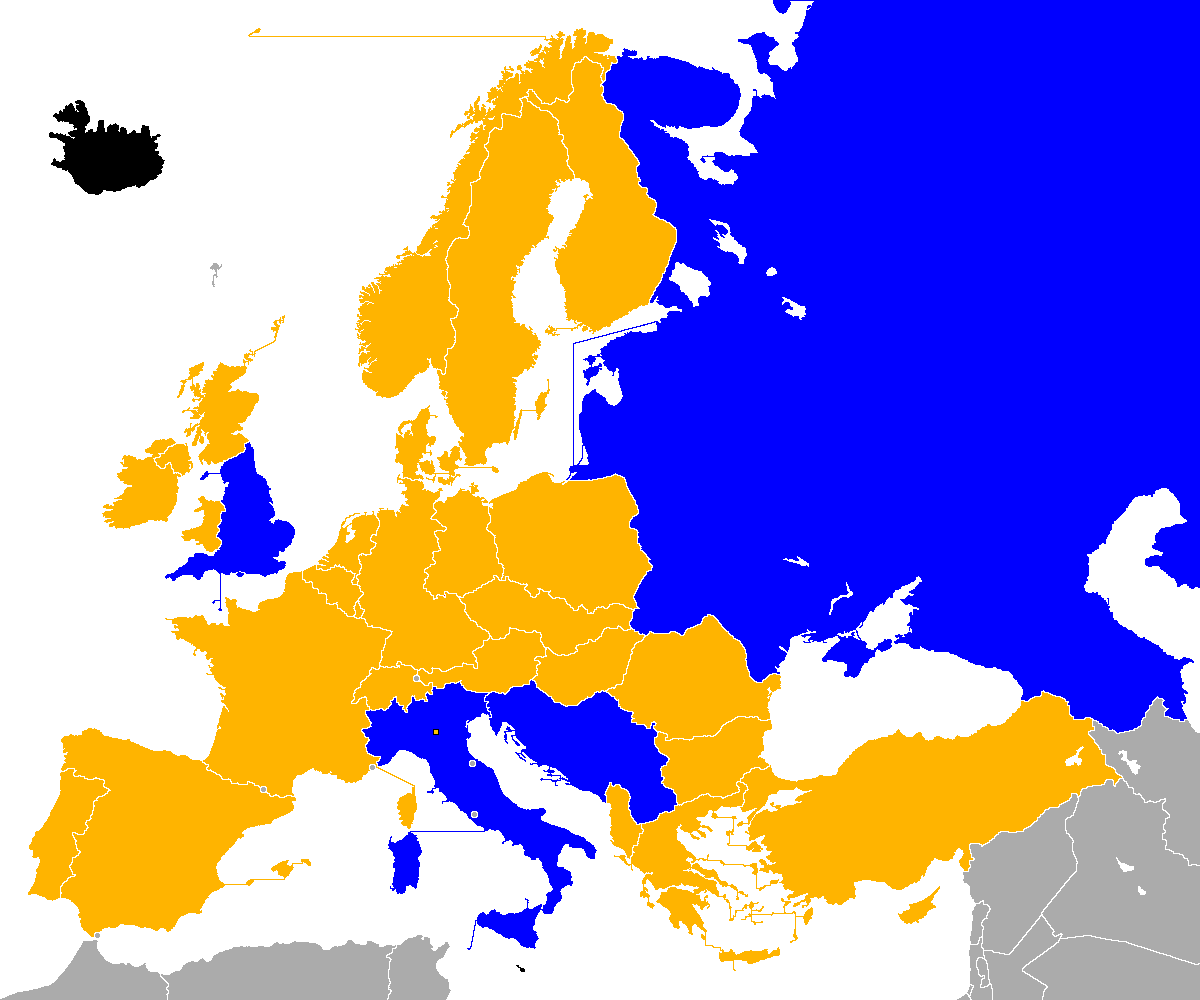
Qualified Did not qualify Did not enter Not a UEFA member

Team	Qualified as	Qualified on	Previous appearances in tournament (Note: Bold indicates champion for that year.)
Italy (host)	Quarter-final winner	20 April 1968	0 (debut)
Yugoslavia	Quarter-final winner	24 April 1968	1 (1960)
England	Quarter-final winner	8 May 1968	0 (debut)
Soviet Union	Quarter-final winner	11 May 1968	2 (**1960**, 1964)

== Summary ==
Group winners advanced to the quarter-finals (second round)
Other teams were eliminated after the qualifying group stage

Group 1	Group 2	Group 3	Group 4	Group 5	Group 6	Group 7	Group 8
Spain	Bulgaria	Soviet Union	Yugoslavia	Hungary	Italy	France	England
Czechoslovakia Republic of Ireland Turkey	Portugal Sweden Norway	Greece Austria Finland	West Germany Albania	East Germany Netherlands Denmark	Romania Switzerland Cyprus	Belgium Poland Luxembourg	Scotland Wales Northern Ireland

== Tiebreakers ==
If two or more teams finished level on points after completion of the group matches, the following tie-breakers were used to determine the final ranking:

1. Greater number of points in all group matches
2. Goal difference in all group matches
3. Greater number of goals scored in all group matches
4. Drawing of lots

== Groups ==
=== Group 1 ===
Pos	Team	Pld	W	D	L	GF	GA	GD	Pts	Qualification	(Spain)	(Czechoslovakia)	(Republic of Ireland)	(Turkey)
1	Spain	6	3	2	1	6	2	+4	**8**	Advance to quarter-finals	—	2–1	2–0	2–0
2	Czechoslovakia	6	3	1	2	8	4	+4	**7**		1–0	—	1–2	3–0
3	Republic of Ireland	6	2	1	3	5	8	−3	**5**		0–0	0–2	—	2–1
4	Turkey	6	1	2	3	3	8	−5	**4**		0–0	0–0	2–1	—

Source: UEFA

=== Group 2 ===
Pos	Team	Pld	W	D	L	GF	GA	GD	Pts	Qualification	(Bulgaria)	(Portugal)	(Sweden)	(Norway)
1	Bulgaria	6	4	2	0	10	2	+8	**10**	Advance to quarter-finals	—	1–0	3–0	4–2
2	Portugal	6	2	2	2	6	6	0	**6**		0–0	—	1–2	2–1
3	Sweden	6	2	1	3	9	12	−3	**5**		0–2	1–1	—	5–2
4	Norway	6	1	1	4	9	14	−5	**3**		0–0	1–2	3–1	—

Source: UEFA

=== Group 3 ===
Pos	Team	Pld	W	D	L	GF	GA	GD	Pts	Qualification	(Soviet Union)	(Greece)	(Austria)	(Finland)
1	Soviet Union	6	5	0	1	16	6	+10	**10**	Advance to quarter-finals	—	4–0	4–3	2–0
2	Greece	5	2	1	2	7	8	−1	**5**		0–1	—	4–1	2–1
3	Austria	5	2	1	2	7	9	−2	**5**		1–0	Void (Note: The Austria v Greece match was abandoned in the 86th minute at 1–1 due to a crowd disturbance and declared void.)	—	2–1
4	Finland	6	0	2	4	5	12	−7	**2**		2–5	1–1	0–0	—

Source: UEFA

=== Group 4 ===
Pos	Team	Pld	W	D	L	GF	GA	GD	Pts	Qualification	(Socialist Federal Republic of Yugoslavia)	(West Germany)	(Albania)
1	Yugoslavia	4	3	0	1	8	3	+5	**6**	Advance to quarter-finals	—	1–0	4–0
2	West Germany	4	2	1	1	9	2	+7	**5**		3–1	—	6–0
3	Albania	4	0	1	3	0	12	−12	**1**		0–2	0–0	—

Source: UEFA

=== Group 5 ===
Pos	Team	Pld	W	D	L	GF	GA	GD	Pts	Qualification	(Hungary)	(East Germany)	(Netherlands)	(Denmark)
1	Hungary	6	4	1	1	15	5	+10	**9**	Advance to quarter-finals	—	3–1	2–1	6–0
2	East Germany	6	3	1	2	10	10	0	**7**		1–0	—	4–3	3–2
3	Netherlands	6	2	1	3	11	11	0	**5**		2–2	1–0	—	2–0
4	Denmark	6	1	1	4	6	16	−10	**3**		0–2	1–1	3–2	—

Source: UEFA

=== Group 6 ===
Pos	Team	Pld	W	D	L	GF	GA	GD	Pts	Qualification	(Italy)	(Romania)	(Switzerland)	(Cyprus)
1	Italy	6	5	1	0	17	3	+14	**11**	Advance to quarter-finals	—	3–1	4–0	5–0
2	Romania	6	3	0	3	18	14	+4	**6**		0–1	—	4–2	7–0
3	Switzerland	6	2	1	3	17	13	+4	**5**		2–2	7–1	—	5–0
4	Cyprus	6	1	0	5	3	25	−22	**2**		0–2	1–5	2–1	—

Source: UEFA

=== Group 7 ===
Pos	Team	Pld	W	D	L	GF	GA	GD	Pts	Qualification	(France)	(Belgium)	(Poland)	(Luxembourg)
1	France	6	4	1	1	14	6	+8	**9**	Advance to quarter-finals	—	1–1	2–1	3–1
2	Belgium	6	3	1	2	14	9	+5	**7**		2–1	—	2–4	3–0
3	Poland	6	3	1	2	13	9	+4	**7**		1–4	3–1	—	4–0
4	Luxembourg	6	0	1	5	1	18	−17	**1**		0–3	0–5	0–0	—

Source: UEFA

=== Group 8 ===
Group 8's results were formed by combining the results of the 1966–67 and 1967–68 editions of the British Home Championship.

Pos	Team	Pld	W	D	L	GF	GA	GD	Pts	Qualification	(England)	(Scotland)	(Wales)	(Northern Ireland)
1	England	6	4	1	1	15	5	+10	**9**	Advance to quarter-finals	—	2–3	5–1	2–0
2	Scotland	6	3	2	1	10	8	+2	**8**		1–1	—	3–2	2–1
3	Wales	6	1	2	3	6	12	−6	**4**		0–3	1–1	—	2–0
4	Northern Ireland	6	1	1	4	2	8	−6	**3**		0–2	1–0	0–0	—

Source: UEFA

== Quarter-finals ==
Team 1	Agg.	Team 2	1st leg	2nd leg
Bulgaria	3–4	Italy	3–2	0–2
Hungary	2–3	Soviet Union	2–0	0–3
England	3–1	Spain	1–0	2–1
France	2–6	Yugoslavia	1–1	1–5

== Goalscorers ==
There were 306 goals scored in 98 matches, for an average of 3.12 goals per match.

6 goals

- (Hungary national football team) János Farkas
- (Italy national football team) Luigi Riva

5 goals

- (East Germany national football team) Henning Frenzel
- (France national football team) Fleury Di Nallo
- (Italy national football team) Sandro Mazzola
- (Romania national football team) Constantin Frățilă
- (Switzerland national football team) Fritz Künzli
- (Germany national football team) Gerd Müller

4 goals

- (Belgium national football team) Paul Van Himst
- (Bulgaria national football team) Petar Zhekov
- (England national football team) Bobby Charlton
- (England national football team) Geoff Hurst
- (England national football team) Martin Peters
- (Greece national football team) Giorgos Sideris
- (Italy national football team) Angelo Domenghini
- (Switzerland national football team) Rolf Blättler

3 goals

- (Austria national football team) Leopold Grausam
- (Belgium national football team) Jacques Stockman
- (Bulgaria national football team) Dinko Dermendzhiev
- (Denmark national football team) Kresten Bjerre
- (Finland national football team) Juhani Peltonen
- (France national football team) Georges Lech
- (France national football team) Charly Loubet
- (Hungary national football team) Flórián Albert
- (Hungary national football team) Kálmán Mészöly
- (Poland national football team) Janusz Żmijewski
- (Romania national football team) Mircea Dridea
- (Romania national football team) Emil Dumitriu
- (Soviet Union national football team) Anatoliy Banishevskiy
- (Soviet Union national football team) Igor Chislenko
- (Soviet Union national football team) Eduard Malofeyev
- (Soviet Union national football team) Yozhef Sabo
- (Sweden men's national football team) Inge Danielsson
- (Switzerland national football team) Karl Odermatt
- (Switzerland national football team) René-Pierre Quentin
- (Germany national football team) Hannes Löhr
- (Yugoslavia national football team) Vahidin Musemić
- (Yugoslavia national football team) Slaven Zambata

2 goals

- (Austria national football team) Helmut Siber
- (Belgium national football team) Roger Claessen
- (Belgium national football team) Johan Devrindt
- (Belgium national football team) Johnny Thio
- (Bulgaria national football team) Nikola Kotkov
- (Bulgaria national football team) Nikola Tsanev
- (Czechoslovakia national football team) Jozef Adamec
- (Denmark national football team) Tom Søndergaard
- (East Germany national football team) Herbert Pankau
- (England national football team) Jack Charlton
- (France national football team) Robert Herbin
- (Greece national football team) Alekos Alexiadis
- (Hungary national football team) Ferenc Bene
- (Italy national football team) Pierino Prati
- (Netherlands national football team) Johan Cruyff
- (Netherlands national football team) Piet Keizer
- (Netherlands national football team) Wim Suurbier
- (Norway national football team) Kjetil Hasund
- (Norway national football team) Odd Iversen
- (Norway national football team) Olav Nilsen
- (Poland national football team) Lucjan Brychczy
- (Poland national football team) Ryszard Grzegorczyk
- (Poland national football team) Włodzimierz Lubański
- (Portugal national football team) Eusébio
- (Portugal national football team) Jaime Graça
- (Romania national football team) Nicolae Dobrin
- (Romania national football team) Ion Ionescu
- (Romania national football team) Mircea Lucescu
- (Scotland national football team) Alan Gilzean
- (Scotland national football team) Denis Law
- (Scotland national football team) Bobby Lennox
- (Soviet Union national football team) Anatoliy Byshovets
- (Soviet Union national football team) Murtaz Khurtsilava
- (Spain national football team) Pirri
- (Sweden men's national football team) Leif Eriksson
- (Sweden men's national football team) Tom Turesson
- (Turkey national football team) Ogün Altıparmak
- (Wales national football team) Ron Davies
- (Wales national football team) Wyn Davies
- (Yugoslavia national football team) Ivica Osim
- (Yugoslavia national football team) Ilija Petković

1 goal

- (Austria national football team) Rudi Flögel
- (Austria national football team) Erich Hof
- (Austria national football team) Franz Wolny
- (Belgium national football team) Wilfried Puis
- (Bulgaria national football team) Georgi Asparuhov
- (Bulgaria national football team) Vasil Mitkov
- (Cyprus national football team) Melis Asprou
- (Cyprus national football team) Pamboullis Papadopoulos
- (Cyprus national football team) Kostakis Pierides
- (Czechoslovakia national football team) Alexander Horváth
- (Czechoslovakia national football team) Josef Jurkanin
- (Czechoslovakia national football team) Ladislav Kuna
- (Czechoslovakia national football team) Vojtech Masný
- (Czechoslovakia national football team) Juraj Szikora
- (Denmark national football team) Erik Dyreborg
- (East Germany national football team) Gerhard Körner
- (East Germany national football team) Wolfram Löwe
- (East Germany national football team) Eberhard Vogel
- (England national football team) Alan Ball
- (England national football team) Roger Hunt
- (England national football team) Norman Hunter
- (Finland national football team) Pertti Mäkipää
- (Finland national football team) Simo Syrjävaara
- (France national football team) André Guy
- (France national football team) Yves Herbet
- (France national football team) Hervé Revelli
- (Greece national football team) Stathis Chaitas
- (Greece national football team) Mimis Papaioannou
- (Hungary national football team) János Göröcs
- (Hungary national football team) Dezső Molnár
- (Hungary national football team) Zoltán Varga
- (Italy national football team) Mario Bertini
- (Italy national football team) Virginio De Paoli
- (Italy national football team) Giacinto Facchetti
- (Luxembourg national football team) Jean Klein
- (Netherlands national football team) Rinus Israël
- (Netherlands national football team) Jan Mulder
- (Netherlands national football team) Miel Pijs
- (Netherlands national football team) Sjaak Swart
- (Netherlands national football team) Willy van der Kuijlen
- (Northern Ireland national football team) Dave Clements
- (Northern Ireland national football team) Jimmy Nicholson
- (Norway national football team) Harald Berg
- (Norway national football team) Sven Otto Birkeland
- (Norway national football team) Harald Sunde
- (Poland national football team) Andrzej Jarosik
- (Poland national football team) Jan Liberda
- (Poland national football team) Jerzy Sadek
- (Poland national football team) Zygfryd Szołtysik
- (Portugal national football team) Custódio Pinto
- (Portugal national football team) José Augusto Torres
- (Republic of Ireland national football team) Noel Cantwell
- (Republic of Ireland national football team) Andy McEvoy
- (Republic of Ireland national football team) Turlough O'Connor
- (Republic of Ireland national football team) Frank O'Neill
- (Republic of Ireland national football team) Ray Treacy
- (Romania national football team) Florea Martinovici
- (Scotland national football team) John Hughes
- (Scotland national football team) Jim McCalliog
- (Scotland national football team) Ronnie McKinnon
- (Scotland national football team) Bobby Murdoch
- (Soviet Union national football team) Valery Maslov
- (Soviet Union national football team) Eduard Streltsov
- (Spain national football team) Amancio Amaro
- (Spain national football team) José Eulogio Gárate
- (Spain national football team) José María García Lavilla
- (Spain national football team) Francisco Gento
- (Spain national football team) Ramón Grosso
- (Sweden men's national football team) Thomas Nordahl
- (Sweden men's national football team) Ingvar Svensson
- (Switzerland national football team) Richard Dürr
- (Turkey national football team) Ayhan Elmastaşoğlu
- (Wales national football team) Alan Durban
- (Wales national football team) Ronnie Rees
- (Germany national football team) Uwe Seeler
- (Yugoslavia national football team) Dragan Džajić
- (Yugoslavia national football team) Vojin Lazarević
- (Yugoslavia national football team) Josip Skoblar
- (Yugoslavia national football team) Edin Sprečo

1 own goal

- (Bulgaria national football team) Dimitar Penev (against Italy)
- (Cyprus national football team) Kostas Panayiotou (against Switzerland)
- (Hungary national football team) Ernő Solymosi (against Soviet Union)
- (Republic of Ireland national football team) John Dempsey (against Czechoslovakia)
- (Wales national football team) Terry Hennessey (against England)
