= UEFA Euro 1968 qualifying Group 2 =

Football tournament qualifying stage

Group 2 of the UEFA Euro 1968 qualifying tournament was one of the eight groups to decide which teams would qualify for the UEFA Euro 1968 finals tournament. Group 2 consisted of four teams: Bulgaria, Portugal, Sweden, and Norway, where they played against each other home-and-away in a round-robin format. The group winners were Bulgaria, who finished 4 points above Portugal.

== Final table ==
Pos	Team	Pld	W	D	L	GF	GA	GD	Pts	Qualification	(Bulgaria)	(Portugal)	(Sweden)	(Norway)
1	Bulgaria	6	4	2	0	10	2	+8	10	Advance to quarter-finals	—	1–0	3–0	4–2
2	Portugal	6	2	2	2	6	6	0	6		0–0	—	1–2	2–1
3	Sweden	6	2	1	3	9	12	−3	5		0–2	1–1	—	5–2
4	Norway	6	1	1	4	9	14	−5	3		0–0	1–2	3–1	—

Source: UEFA
Rules for classification: Qualification tiebreakers

== Matches ==
13 November 1966
15:00

Bulgaria	4–2	Norway
Tsanev 18', 43'; Zhekov 42', 85'	Report	Hasund 59', 86'

Vasil Levski Stadium, Sofia
Attendance: 20,762
Referee: Muzaffer Sarvan (Turkey)

13 November 1966
15:00

Portugal	1–2	Sweden
Graça 21'	Report	Danielsson 29', 87'

Estádio Nacional, Oeiras (Lisbon)
Attendance: 18,244
Referee: Jacques Colling (Luxembourg)

1 June 1967
19:00

Sweden	1–1	Portugal
Svensson 90'	Report	Custódio Pinto 19'

Råsunda Stadion, Solna (Stockholm)
Attendance: 49,689
Referee: Kevin Howley (England)

8 June 1967
19:00

Norway	1–2	Portugal
Iversen 34'	Report	Eusébio 15', 61'

Ullevaal, Oslo
Attendance: 29,993
Referee: William Syme (Scotland)

11 June 1967
16:00

Sweden	0–2	Bulgaria
	Report	Zhekov 23'; Dermendzhiev 82'

Råsunda Stadion, Solna (Stockholm)
Attendance: 24,271
Referee: Leo Callaghan (Wales)

29 June 1967
19:00

Norway	0–0	Bulgaria
	Report

Ullevaal, Oslo
Attendance: 25,545
Referee: John Adair (Northern Ireland)

3 September 1967
13:15

Norway	3–1	Sweden
Berg 24'; Birkeland 46'; Sunde 79'	Report	Nordahl 19'

Ullevaal, Oslo
Attendance: 32,151
Referee: Jan Pawlik (Poland)

5 November 1967
14:00

Sweden	5–2	Norway
Turesson 15', 89'; Danielsson 40'; Eriksson 48', 85'	Report	Iversen 57' (pen.); Nilsen 90'

Råsunda Stadion, Solna (Stockholm)
Attendance: 14,078
Referee: Rudolf Glöckner (East Germany)

12 November 1967
15:00

Bulgaria	3–0	Sweden
Kotkov 43'; Mitkov 44'; Asparuhov 75'	Report

Vasil Levski Stadium, Sofia
Attendance: 16,479
Referee: Josip Drago Horvat (Yugoslavia)

12 November 1967
15:00

Portugal	2–1	Norway
Torres 29'; Graça 65'	Report	Nilsen 40'

Estádio das Antas, Porto
Attendance: 20,500
Referee: Michel Kitabdjian (France)

26 November 1967
14:30

Bulgaria	1–0	Portugal
Dermendzhiev 63'	Report

Vasil Levski Stadium, Sofia
Attendance: 39,795
Referee: Anvar Zverev (USSR)

17 December 1967
16:00

Portugal	0–0	Bulgaria
	Report

Estádio Nacional, Oeiras (Lisbon)
Attendance: 13,408
Referee: Antonio Sbardella (Italy)

== Goalscorers ==
There were 34 goals scored in 12 matches, for an average of 2.83 goals per match.

3 goals

- (Bulgaria) Petar Zhekov
- (Sweden) Inge Danielsson

2 goals

- (Bulgaria) Dinko Dermendzhiev
- (Bulgaria) Nikola Tsanev
- (Norway) Kjetil Hasund
- (Norway) Odd Iversen
- (Norway) Olav Nilsen
- (Portugal) Eusébio
- (Portugal) Jaime Graça
- (Sweden) Leif Eriksson
- (Sweden) Tom Turesson

1 goal

- (Bulgaria) Georgi Asparuhov
- (Bulgaria) Nikola Kotkov
- (Bulgaria) Vasil Mitkov
- (Norway) Harald Berg
- (Norway) Sven Otto Birkeland
- (Norway) Harald Sunde
- (Portugal) Custódio Pinto
- (Portugal) José Augusto Torres
- (Sweden) Thomas Nordahl
- (Sweden) Ingvar Svensson
