= 1964–67 Nordic Football Championship =

Tournament details
- Host countries: Denmark; Finland; Norway; Sweden
- Dates: 28 June 1964 – 5 November 1967
- Teams: 4

Final positions
- Champions: Sweden (7th title)
- Runners-up: Denmark
- Third place: Finland
- Fourth place: Norway

Tournament statistics
- Matches played: 24
- Goals scored: 71 (2.96 per match)
- Top scorer(s): (Denmark) Erik Dyreborg (Denmark) Ole Madsen (Sweden) Tom Turesson (5 goals)

The 1964–67 Nordic Football Championship was the ninth tournament staged. Four Nordic countries participated: Denmark, Finland, Norway and Sweden. Sweden won the tournament, its seventh Nordic Championship win.

== Results ==
=== 1964 ===
28 June 1964
17:00 (UTC+1:00)

Sweden	4-1	Denmark
Öberg 12'; Bild 47'; Martinsson 57'; Magnusson 64'	Report	Danielsen 65'

Malmö Stadion, Malmö
Attendance: 25,678
Referee: Birger Nilsen (Norway)
2 August 1964
18:00 (UTC+2:00)

Finland	1-0	Sweden
Järvi 59'	Report

Olympic Stadium, Helsinki
Attendance: 15,551
Referee: Helmut Köhler (West Germany)
20 August 1964
18:30 (UTC+2:00)

Norway	2-0	Finland
Berg 20'; Seemann 30'	Report

Lerkendal Stadion Trondheim
Attendance: 17,056
Referee: Einer Poulsen (Denmark)
6 September 1964
15:00 (UTC+2:00)

Finland	2-1	Denmark
Järvi 24'; Peltonen 76'	Report	Rasmussen 85'

Olympic Stadium, Helsinki
Attendance: 16,319
Referee: Bertil Lööw (Sweden)
20 September 1964
13:15 (UTC+1:00)

Norway	1-1	Sweden
Seemann 55'	Report	Larsson 40' (pen.)

Ullevaal Stadion, Oslo
Attendance: 22,132
Referee: Bobby Davidson (Scotland)
11 October 1964
13:30 (UTC+1:00)

Denmark	2-0	Norway
Madsen 43', 83'	Report

Idrætsparken, Copenhagen
Attendance: 40,700
Referee: Erik Beijar (Finland)

=== 1965 ===
9 June 1965
19:00 (UTC+1:00)

Denmark	3-1	Finland
Sørensen 47'; Madsen 53', 60'	Report	Tosla 7'

Idrætsparken, Copenhagen
Attendance: 33,400
Referee: Gerhard Schulenburg (West Germany)
20 June 1965
13:30 (UTC+1:00)

Denmark	2-1	Sweden
Madsen 18'; Sørensen 34'	Report	Persson 30'

Idrætsparken, Copenhagen
Attendance: 50,000
Referee: Birger Nilsen (Norway)
8 August 1965
18:30 (UTC+2:00)

Finland	4-0	Norway
Pahlman 36'; Mäkilä 63'; Kumpulampi 79'; Lindholm 88'	Report

Olympic Stadium, Helsinki
Attendance: 16,525
Referee: Einar Boström (Sweden)
22 August 1965
13:30 (UTC+1:00)

Sweden	2-2	Finland
Bild 2'; Simonsson 82'	Report	Pahlman 35'; Mäkilä 55'

Skogsvallen, Luleå
Attendance: 13,970
Referee: Carl Werner Hansen (Denmark)
26 September 1965
13:15 (UTC+1:00)

Norway	2-2	Denmark
Stavrum 18'; Johansen 40'	Report	Troelsen 44'; Fritsen 53'

Ullevaal Stadion, Oslo
Attendance: 14,913
Referee: Pehr Engblom (Finland)
31 October 1965
13:30 (UTC+1:00)

Sweden	0-0	Norway
	Report

Råsunda Stadium, Stockholm
Attendance: 12,922
Referee: Wacław Majdan (Poland)

=== 1966 ===
4 June 1966
19:00 (UTC+2:00)

Finland	1-0	Sweden
Lindholm 20'	Report

Olympic Stadium, Helsinki
Attendance: 29,622
Referee: Birger Nilsen (Norway)
26 June 1966
13:30 (UTC+1:00)

Denmark	0-1	Norway
	Report	Johansen 51'

Idrætsparken, Copenhagen
Attendance: 27,500
Referee: Curt Liedberg (Sweden)
14 August 1966
13:15 (UTC+1:00)

Norway	1-1	Finland
Pedersen 25'	Report	Lindholm 68'

Stavanger Stadion, Stavanger
Attendance: 11,500
Referee: Gerhard Schulenburg (West Germany)
18 September 1966
14:00 (UTC+2:00)

Finland	2-1	Denmark
Mäkipää 37'; Laine 61'	Report	Jørgensen 14'

Olympic Stadium, Helsinki
Attendance: 19,223
Referee: Kurt Tschenscher (West Germany)
18 September 1966
13:15 (UTC+1:00)

Norway	2-4	Sweden
Hasund 9'; Berg 27'	Report	Karlsson 48' (pen.); Turesson 60', 63', 70'

Ullevaal Stadion, Oslo
Attendance: 24,551
Referee: Bramming Sørensen (Denmark)
6 November 1966
13:30 (UTC+1:00)

Sweden	2-1	Denmark
Simonsson 27'; Danielsson 48'	Report	Wiberg 13'

Råsunda Stadium, Stockholm
Attendance: 16,780
Referee: Toimi Olkku (Finland)

=== 1967 ===
1 June 1967
19:00 (UTC+2:00)

Finland	0-2	Norway
	Report	Nilsen 20', 58'

Olympic Stadium, Helsinki
Attendance: 6,672
Referee: Arne Jensen (Denmark)
25 June 1967
13:00 (UTC+1:00)

Denmark	1-1	Sweden
Bjerre 70' (pen.)	Report	Selander 56'

Idrætsparken, Copenhagen
Attendance: 49,100
Referee: Kurt Handwerker (West Germany)
10 August 1967
19:00 (UTC+1:00)

Sweden	2-0	Finland
Eriksson 44'; Danielsson 74'	Report

Råsunda Stadium, Stockholm
Attendance: 11,909
Referee: Stanisław Eksztajn (Poland)
24 September 1967
13:15 (UTC+1:00)

Norway	0-5	Denmark
	Report	Dyreborg 40', 41', 57', 60', 63'

Ullevaal Stadion, Oslo
Attendance: 24,987
Referee: Bo Nilsson (Sweden)
22 October 1967
13:30 (UTC+1:00)

Denmark	3-0	Finland
Hansen 33'; Bjerre 67' (pen.); Laudrup 74'	Report

Idrætsparken, Copenhagen
Attendance: 35,500
Referee: Ivar Hornslien (Norway)
5 November 1967
14:00 (UTC+1:00)

Sweden	5-2	Norway
Turesson 13', 89'; Danielsson 39'; Eriksson 48' (85)	Report	Iversen 57' (pen.); Nilsen 90'

Råsunda Stadium, Stockholm
Attendance: 14,078
Referee: Rudi Glöckner (East Germany)

== Table ==
The table is compiled by awarding two points for a victory, one point for a draw, and no points for a loss.

	Team	Pld	W	D	L	GF	GA	GD	Pts
1	Sweden	12	5	4	3	22	14	+8	14
2	Denmark	12	5	2	5	22	16	+6	12
3	Finland	12	5	2	5	14	17	–3	12
4	Norway	12	3	4	5	13	24	–11	10

== Winners ==
1964–67 Nordic Football Championship winners

Sweden
Seventh title

== Statistics ==
=== Goalscorers ===
There were 71 goals scored in 24 matches, for an average of 2.96 goals per match.

5 goals

- (Denmark) Erik Dyreborg
- (Denmark) Ole Madsen
- (Sweden) Tom Turesson

3 goals

- (Finland) Tommy Lindholm
- (Norway) Olav Nilsen
- (Sweden) Inge Danielsson
- (Sweden) Leif Eriksson

2 goals

- (Denmark) Kresten Bjerre
- (Denmark) Ole Sørensen
- (Finland) Asko Mäkilä
- (Finland) Kai Pahlman
- (Finland) Harri Järvi
- (Norway) Erik Johansen
- (Norway) Finn Seemann
- (Norway) Harald Berg
- (Sweden) Agne Simonsson
- (Sweden) Harry Bild

1 goal

- (Denmark) Finn Laudrup
- (Denmark) Finn Wiberg
- (Denmark) Johnny Hansen
- (Denmark) John Danielsen
- (Denmark) Jørgen Jørgensen
- (Denmark) Jørgen Rasmussen
- (Denmark) Ole Fritsen
- (Denmark) Tommy Troelsen
- (Finland) Aulis Laine
- (Finland) Arto Tolsa
- (Finland) Juhani Peltonen
- (Finland) Markku Kumpulampi
- (Finland) Pertti Mäkipää
- (Norway) Arne Pedersen
- (Norway) Kjetil Hasund
- (Norway) Odd Iversen
- (Norway) Ole Stavrum
- (Sweden) Bo Larsson
- (Sweden) Jan Karlsson
- (Sweden) Hans Selander
- (Sweden) Prawitz Öberg
- (Sweden) Örjan Martinsson
- (Sweden) Örjan Persson
- (Sweden) Roger Magnusson

== See also ==
Balkan Cup
Baltic Cup
Central European International Cup
Mediterranean Cup
