= UEFA Euro 1968 qualifying Group 8 =

Football tournament qualifying stage

Group 8 of the UEFA Euro 1968 qualifying tournament was one of the eight groups to decide which teams would qualify for the UEFA Euro 1968 finals tournament. Group 8 consisted of four teams: England, Scotland, Wales, and Northern Ireland, where they played against each other home-and-away in a round-robin format. Group 8's results were formed by combining the results of the 1966–67 and 1967–68 editions of the British Home Championship. The group winners were England, who finished 1 point above Scotland.

== Final table ==
| Pos | Team | Pld | W | D | L | GF | GA | GD | Pts | Qualification | (England) | (Scotland) | (Wales) | (Northern Ireland) |
|---|---|---|---|---|---|---|---|---|---|---|---|---|---|---|
| 1 | England | 6 | 4 | 1 | 1 | 15 | 5 | +10 | 9 | Advance to quarter-finals | — | 2–3 | 5–1 | 2–0 |
| 2 | Scotland | 6 | 3 | 2 | 1 | 10 | 8 | +2 | 8 | | 1–1 | — | 3–2 | 2–1 |
| 3 | Wales | 6 | 1 | 2 | 3 | 6 | 12 | −6 | 4 | | 0–3 | 1–1 | — | 2–0 |
| 4 | Northern Ireland | 6 | 1 | 1 | 4 | 2 | 8 | −6 | 3 | | 0–2 | 1–0 | 0–0 | — |

Source: UEFA
Rules for classification: Qualification tiebreakers

== Matches ==
=== 1966–67 British Home Championship ===
22 October 1966

| Wales | 1–1 | Scotland |
|---|---|---|
| R. Davies 77' | Report | Law 86' |

Ninian Park, Cardiff
Attendance: 33,269
Referee: Ken Dagnall (England)
22 October 1966
15:00

| Northern Ireland | 0–2 | England |
|---|---|---|
| | Report | Hunt 40'; Peters 60' |

Windsor Park, Belfast
Attendance: 47,897
Referee: Robert Holley Davidson (Scotland)

16 November 1966
20:00

| Scotland | 2–1 | Northern Ireland |
|---|---|---|
| Murdoch 14'; Lennox 35' | Report | Nicholson 9' |

Hampden Park, Glasgow
Attendance: 45,281
Referee: John Keith Taylor (England)
16 November 1966

| England | 5–1 | Wales |
|---|---|---|
| Hurst 30', 34'; B. Charlton 43'; Hennessey 65' (o.g.); J. Charlton 84' | Report | W. Davies 36' |

Wembley Stadium, London
Attendance: 75,380
Referee: Thomas Wharton (Scotland)

12 April 1967
19:30

| Northern Ireland | 0–0 | Wales |
|---|---|---|
| | Report |

Windsor Park, Belfast
Attendance: 17,643
Referee: Kevin Howley (England)
15 April 1967
15:00

| England | 2–3 | Scotland |
|---|---|---|
| J. Charlton 84'; Hurst 88' | Report | Law 27'; Lennox 78'; McCalliog 87' |

Wembley Stadium, London
Attendance: 99,063
Referee: Gerhard Schulenburg (West Germany)

=== 1967–68 British Home Championship ===
21 October 1967
15:00

| Wales | 0–3 | England |
|---|---|---|
| | Report | Peters 34'; B. Charlton 87'; Ball 90' (pen.) |

Ninian Park, Cardiff
Attendance: 44,960
Referee: John Robertson P. Gordon (Scotland)
21 October 1967
15:00

| Northern Ireland | 1–0 | Scotland |
|---|---|---|
| Clements 69' | Report |

Windsor Park, Belfast
Attendance: 47,359
Referee: James Finney (England)

22 November 1967
19:45

| England | 2–0 | Northern Ireland |
|---|---|---|
| Hurst 43'; B. Charlton 62' | Report |

Wembley Stadium, London
Attendance: 83,969
Referee: Leo Callaghan (Wales)
22 November 1967
20:00

| Scotland | 3–2 | Wales |
|---|---|---|
| Gilzean 16', 65'; McKinnon 78' | Report | R. Davies 18'; Durban 57' |

Hampden Park, Glasgow
Attendance: 57,472
Referee: James Finney (England)

24 February 1968
15:00

| Scotland | 1–1 | England |
|---|---|---|
| Hughes 39' | Report | Peters 19' |

Hampden Park, Glasgow
Attendance: 134,461
Referee: Laurens van Ravens (Netherlands)
28 February 1968
19:15

| Wales | 2–0 | Northern Ireland |
|---|---|---|
| Rees 75'; W. Davies 84' | Report |

Racecourse Ground, Wrexham
Attendance: 17,548
Referee: Robert Holley Davidson (Scotland)

== Goalscorers ==
There were 33 goals scored in 12 matches, for an average of 2.75 goals per match.

4 goals

- (England national football team) Geoff Hurst

3 goals

- (England national football team) Bobby Charlton
- (England national football team) Martin Peters

2 goals

- (England national football team) Jack Charlton
- (Scotland national football team) Alan Gilzean
- (Scotland national football team) Denis Law
- (Scotland national football team) Bobby Lennox
- (Wales national football team) Ron Davies
- (Wales national football team) Wyn Davies

1 goal

- (England national football team) Alan Ball
- (England national football team) Roger Hunt
- (Northern Ireland national football team) Dave Clements
- (Northern Ireland national football team) Jimmy Nicholson
- (Scotland national football team) John Hughes
- (Scotland national football team) Jim McCalliog
- (Scotland national football team) Ronnie McKinnon
- (Scotland national football team) Bobby Murdoch
- (Wales national football team) Alan Durban
- (Wales national football team) Ronnie Rees

1 own goal

- (Wales national football team) Terry Hennessey (against England)
