= UEFA Euro 1968 qualifying Group 5 =

Football tournament qualifying stage

Group 5 of the UEFA Euro 1968 qualifying tournament was one of the eight groups to decide which teams would qualify for the UEFA Euro 1968 finals tournament. Group 5 consisted of four teams: Hungary, East Germany, Netherlands, and Denmark, where they played against each other home-and-away in a round-robin format. The group winners were Hungary, who finished 2 points above East Germany.

== Final table ==
Pos	Team	Pld	W	D	L	GF	GA	GD	Pts	Qualification	(Hungary)	(East Germany)	(Netherlands)	(Denmark)
1	Hungary	6	4	1	1	15	5	+10	9	Advance to quarter-finals	—	3–1	2–1	6–0
2	East Germany	6	3	1	2	10	10	0	7		1–0	—	4–3	3–2
3	Netherlands	6	2	1	3	11	11	0	5		2–2	1–0	—	2–0
4	Denmark	6	1	1	4	6	16	−10	3		0–2	1–1	3–2	—

Source: UEFA
Rules for classification: Qualification tiebreakers

== Matches ==
7 September 1966
20:30

Netherlands	2–2	Hungary
Pijs 35'; Cruyff 54'	Report	Molnár 70'; Mészöly 86'

Feyenoord Stadion (De Kuip), Rotterdam
Attendance: 62,100
Referee: Birger Nilsen (Norway)

21 September 1966
18:30

Hungary	6–0	Denmark
Albert 1', 30'; Mészöly 9' (pen.); Bene 14'; Farkas 36'; Varga 83'	Report

Népstadion, Budapest
Attendance: 18,487
Referee: Petros Tzouvaras (Greece)

30 November 1966
20:30

Netherlands	2–0	Denmark
Swart 88'; Van der Kuijlen 90'	Report

Feyenoord Stadion (De Kuip), Rotterdam
Attendance: 25,134
Referee: Aníbal da Silva Oliveira (Portugal)

5 April 1967
17:00

East Germany	4–3	Netherlands
Vogel 50'; Frenzel 62', 78', 85'	Report	Mulder 10'; Keizer 12', 65'

Zentralstadion, Leipzig
Attendance: 30,207
Referee: Hannes Þorsteinn Sigurðsson (Iceland)

10 May 1967
19:15

Hungary	2–1	Netherlands
Mészöly 8' (pen.); Farkas 30'	Report	Suurbier 63'

Népstadion, Budapest
Attendance: 24,352
Referee: Franz Mayer (Austria)

24 May 1967
19:00

Denmark	0–2	Hungary
	Report	Albert 30'; Bene 70'

Idrætsparken, Copenhagen
Attendance: 34,284
Referee: William John Gow (Wales)

4 June 1967
13:30

Denmark	1–1	East Germany
Bjerre 65' (pen.)	Report	Löwe 5'

Idrætsparken, Copenhagen
Attendance: 23,234
Referee: Joseph Hannet (Belgium)

13 September 1967
20:15

Netherlands	1–0	East Germany
Cruyff 2'	Report

Olympisch Stadion, Amsterdam
Attendance: 44,505
Referee: Thomas Wharton (Scotland)

27 September 1967
18:00

Hungary	3–1	East Germany
Farkas 9', 48', 50'	Report	Frenzel 58'

Népstadion, Budapest
Attendance: 69,871
Referee: Tofik Bakhramov (USSR)

4 October 1967
19:00

Denmark	3–2	Netherlands
Bjerre 43' (pen.), 74'; Søndergaard 54'	Report	Suurbier 74'; Israël 76'

Idrætsparken, Copenhagen
Attendance: 34,375
Referee: Malcolm Hall Wright (Northern Ireland)

11 October 1967
17:00

East Germany	3–2	Denmark
Körner 35' (pen.); Pankau 59', 73'	Report	Dyreborg 25'; Søndergaard 38'

Zentralstadion, Leipzig
Attendance: 18,519
Referee: Ryszard Banasiuk (Poland)

29 October 1967
14:00

East Germany	1–0	Hungary
Frenzel 51'	Report

Zentralstadion, Leipzig
Attendance: 48,872
Referee: Robert Héliès (France)

== Goalscorers ==
There were 42 goals scored in 12 matches, for an average of 3.5 goals per match.

5 goals

- (East Germany national football team) Henning Frenzel
- (Hungary national football team) János Farkas

3 goals

- (Denmark national football team) Kresten Bjerre
- (Hungary national football team) Flórián Albert
- (Hungary national football team) Kálmán Mészöly

2 goals

- (Denmark national football team) Tom Søndergaard
- (East Germany national football team) Herbert Pankau
- (Hungary national football team) Ferenc Bene
- (Netherlands national football team) Johan Cruyff
- (Netherlands national football team) Piet Keizer
- (Netherlands national football team) Wim Suurbier

1 goal

- (Denmark national football team) Erik Dyreborg
- (East Germany national football team) Gerhard Körner
- (East Germany national football team) Wolfram Löwe
- (East Germany national football team) Eberhard Vogel
- (Hungary national football team) Dezső Molnár
- (Hungary national football team) Zoltán Varga
- (Netherlands national football team) Rinus Israël
- (Netherlands national football team) Jan Mulder
- (Netherlands national football team) Miel Pijs
- (Netherlands national football team) Sjaak Swart
- (Netherlands national football team) Willy van der Kuijlen
