= UEFA Euro 1968 qualifying Group 4 =

Football tournament qualifying stage

Group 4 of the UEFA Euro 1968 qualifying tournament was one of the eight groups to decide which teams would qualify for the UEFA Euro 1968 finals tournament. Group 4 consisted of three teams: Yugoslavia, West Germany, and Albania, where they played against each other home-and-away in a round-robin format. The group winners were Yugoslavia, who finished 1 point above West Germany. This remains the only time where a West or reunified Germany team participated in qualification for either a World Cup or European Championship and failed to qualify.

== Final table ==
Pos	Team	Pld	W	D	L	GF	GA	GD	Pts	Qualification	(Socialist Federal Republic of Yugoslavia)	(West Germany)	(Albania)
1	Yugoslavia	4	3	0	1	8	3	+5	6	Advance to quarter-finals	—	1–0	4–0
2	West Germany	4	2	1	1	9	2	+7	5		3–1	—	6–0
3	Albania	4	0	1	3	0	12	−12	1		0–2	0–0	—

Source: UEFA
Rules for classification: Qualification tiebreakers

== Matches ==
8 April 1967

West Germany	6–0	Albania
Müller 5', 23', 73', 80' (pen.); Löhr 77', 78'	Report

Stadion Rote Erde, Dortmund
Attendance: 27,674
Referee: Martti Hirviniemi (Finland)

3 May 1967

Yugoslavia	1–0	West Germany
Skoblar 67'	Report

Stadion JNA, Belgrade
Attendance: 36,508
Referee: José María Ortiz de Mendíbil (Spain)

14 May 1967

Albania	0–2	Yugoslavia
	Report	Zambata 22', 56'

Stadiumi Qemal Stafa, Tirana
Attendance: 18,573
Referee: Costas Xanthoulis (Cyprus)

7 October 1967

West Germany	3–1	Yugoslavia
Löhr 10'; Müller 71'; Seeler 86'	Report	Zambata 46'

Volksparkstadion, Hamburg
Attendance: 70,573
Referee: Concetto Lo Bello (Italy)

12 November 1967

Yugoslavia	4–0	Albania
Sprečo 44'; Osim 48', 82'; Lazarević 56'	Report

Stadion JNA, Belgrade
Attendance: 18,573
Referee: Andrei Rădulescu (Romania)

17 December 1967

Albania	0–0	West Germany
	Report

Stadiumi Qemal Stafa, Tirana
Attendance: 21,889
Referee: Ferdinand Marschall (Austria)

== Goalscorers ==
There were 17 goals scored in 6 matches, for an average of 2.83 goals per match.

5 goals

- (Germany national football team) Gerd Müller

3 goals

- (Germany national football team) Hannes Löhr
- (Yugoslavia national football team) Slaven Zambata

2 goals

- (Yugoslavia national football team) Ivica Osim

1 goal

- (Germany national football team) Uwe Seeler
- (Yugoslavia national football team) Vojin Lazarević
- (Yugoslavia national football team) Josip Skoblar
- (Yugoslavia national football team) Edin Sprečo
