= UEFA Euro 1968 qualifying Group 1 =

Football tournament qualifying stage

Group 1 of the UEFA Euro 1968 qualifying tournament was one of the eight groups to decide which teams would qualify for the UEFA Euro 1968 finals tournament. Group 1 consisted of four teams: Spain, Czechoslovakia, Republic of Ireland, and Turkey, where they played against each other home-and-away in a round-robin format. The group winners were Spain, who finished 1 point above Czechoslovakia.

== Final table ==
Pos	Team	Pld	W	D	L	GF	GA	GD	Pts	Qualification	(Spain)	(Czechoslovakia)	(Republic of Ireland)	(Turkey)
1	Spain	6	3	2	1	6	2	+4	8	Advance to quarter-finals	—	2–1	2–0	2–0
2	Czechoslovakia	6	3	1	2	8	4	+4	7		1–0	—	1–2	3–0
3	Republic of Ireland	6	2	1	3	5	8	−3	5		0–0	0–2	—	2–1
4	Turkey	6	1	2	3	3	8	−5	4		0–0	0–0	2–1	—

Source: UEFA
Rules for classification: Qualification tiebreakers

== Matches ==
23 October 1966
15:30

Republic of Ireland	0–0	Spain
	Report

Dalymount Park, Dublin
Attendance: 38,877
Referee: Hans Carlsson (Sweden)

16 November 1966
20:00

Republic of Ireland	2–1	Turkey
O'Neill 60'; McEvoy 74'	Report	Ogün 88'

Dalymount Park, Dublin
Attendance: 22,480
Referee: Tage Sørensen (Denmark)

7 December 1966

Spain	2–0	Republic of Ireland
José María 20'; Pirri 35'	Report

Estadio Mestalla, Valencia
Attendance: 9,810
Referee: Pieter Romer (Netherlands)

1 February 1967

Turkey	0–0	Spain
	Report

Ali Sami Yen Stadı, Istanbul
Attendance: 27,262
Referee: Gyula Gere (Hungary)

22 February 1967
15:00

Turkey	2–1	Republic of Ireland
Ayhan 35'; Ogün 78'	Report	Cantwell 89'

19 Mayıs Stadı, Ankara
Attendance: 31,063
Referee: Dimitar Rumenchev (Bulgaria)

21 May 1967
15:30

Republic of Ireland	0–2	Czechoslovakia
	Report	Szikora 15'; Masný 47'

Dalymount Park, Dublin
Attendance: 12,000 *
Referee: Robert Schaut (Belgium)

(*)NOTE: Attendance also reported as 6,257

31 May 1967

Spain	2–0	Turkey
Grosso 63'; Gento 80'	Report

Estadio San Mamés, Bilbao
Attendance: 27,336
Referee: Othmar Huber (Switzerland)

18 June 1967
17:00

Czechoslovakia	3–0	Turkey
Adamec 25', 70'; Jurkanin 73'	Report

Tehelné Pole (Slovan), Bratislava
Attendance: 17,839
Referee: Paul Schiller (Austria)

1 October 1967
15:00

Czechoslovakia	1–0	Spain
Horváth 47'	Report

Stadión dr. Vacka "Eden" (Slavia), Prague
Attendance: 20,354
Referee: Gerhard Schulenburg (West Germany)

22 October 1967
20:00

Spain	2–1	Czechoslovakia
Pirri 32'; Gárate 61'	Report	Kuna 75'

Santiago Bernabéu, Madrid
Attendance: 35,000 *
Referee: Antonio Sbardella (Italy)

(*)NOTE: Attendance also reported as 25,314

15 November 1967
18:30

Turkey	0–0	Czechoslovakia
	Report

19 Mayıs Stadı, Ankara
Attendance: 19,760 *
Referee: Nicolae Mihăilescu (Romania)

(*)NOTE: Attendance also reported as 35,000

22 November 1967
14:00

Czechoslovakia	1–2	Republic of Ireland
Dempsey 58' (o.g.)	Report	Treacy 63'; O'Connor 86'

Stadión dr. Vacka "Eden" (Slavia), Prague
Attendance: 11,000 *
Referee: Erwin Vetter (East Germany)

(*)NOTE: Attendance also reported as 7,615

== Goalscorers ==
There were 22 goals scored in 12 matches, for an average of 1.83 goals per match.

2 goals

- (Czechoslovakia national football team) Jozef Adamec
- (Spain national football team) Pirri
- (Turkey national football team) Ogün Altıparmak

1 goal

- (Czechoslovakia national football team) Alexander Horváth
- (Czechoslovakia national football team) Josef Jurkanin
- (Czechoslovakia national football team) Ladislav Kuna
- (Czechoslovakia national football team) Vojtech Masný
- (Czechoslovakia national football team) Juraj Szikora
- (Republic of Ireland national football team) Noel Cantwell
- (Republic of Ireland national football team) Andy McEvoy
- (Republic of Ireland national football team) Turlough O'Connor
- (Republic of Ireland national football team) Frank O'Neill
- (Republic of Ireland national football team) Ray Treacy
- (Spain national football team) José Eulogio Gárate
- (Spain national football team) José María García Lavilla
- (Spain national football team) Francisco Gento
- (Spain national football team) Ramón Grosso
- (Turkey national football team) Ayhan Elmastaşoğlu

1 own goal

- (Republic of Ireland national football team) John Dempsey (against Czechoslovakia)
