= 1967–68 in Scottish football =

Division One champions
- Celtic

Division Two champions
- St Mirren

Scottish Cup winners
- Dunfermline Athletic

League Cup winners
- Celtic

Junior Cup winners
- Johnstone Burgh

Teams in Europe
- Aberdeen, Celtic, Dundee, Hibernian, Rangers

Scotland national team
- 1968 BHC / UEFA Euro 1968 qualifying

The 1967–68 season was the 95th season of competitive football in Scotland and the 71st season of Scottish league football.

== Scottish League Division One ==
| Pos | Team | Pld | W | D | L | GF | GA | GD | Pts | Qualification or relegation |
|---|---|---|---|---|---|---|---|---|---|---|
| 1 | Celtic | 34 | 30 | 3 | 1 | 106 | 24 | +82 | 63 | 1968-69 European Cup |
| 2 | Rangers | 34 | 28 | 5 | 1 | 93 | 34 | +59 | 61 | |
| 3 | Hibernian | 34 | 20 | 5 | 9 | 67 | 49 | +18 | 45 | |
| 4 | Dunfermline Athletic | 34 | 17 | 5 | 12 | 64 | 41 | +23 | 39 | |
| 5 | Aberdeen | 34 | 16 | 5 | 13 | 63 | 48 | +15 | 37 | |
| 6 | Morton | 34 | 15 | 6 | 13 | 57 | 53 | +4 | 36 | |
| 7 | Kilmarnock | 34 | 13 | 8 | 13 | 59 | 57 | +2 | 34 | |
| 8 | Clyde | 34 | 15 | 4 | 15 | 55 | 55 | 0 | 34 | |
| 9 | Dundee | 34 | 13 | 7 | 14 | 62 | 59 | +3 | 33 | |
| 10 | Partick Thistle | 34 | 12 | 7 | 15 | 51 | 67 | −16 | 31 | |
| 11 | Dundee United | 34 | 10 | 11 | 13 | 53 | 72 | −19 | 31 | |
| 12 | Heart of Midlothian | 34 | 13 | 4 | 17 | 56 | 61 | −5 | 30 | |
| 13 | Airdrieonians | 34 | 10 | 9 | 15 | 45 | 58 | −13 | 29 | |
| 14 | St Johnstone | 34 | 10 | 7 | 17 | 43 | 52 | −9 | 27 | |
| 15 | Falkirk | 34 | 7 | 12 | 15 | 36 | 50 | −14 | 26 | |
| 16 | Raith Rovers | 34 | 9 | 7 | 18 | 58 | 86 | −28 | 25 | |
| 17 | Motherwell | 34 | 6 | 7 | 21 | 40 | 66 | −26 | 19 | |
| 18 | Stirling Albion | 34 | 4 | 4 | 26 | 29 | 105 | −76 | 12 | |

Source: "1967-1968 First Division - SPFL Archive". SPFL.

Champions: Celtic
Relegated: Motherwell, Stirling Albion

== Scottish League Division Two ==
| Pos | Team | Pld | W | D | L | GF | GA | GD | Pts | Promotion or relegation |
|---|---|---|---|---|---|---|---|---|---|---|
| 1 | St Mirren | 36 | 27 | 8 | 1 | 100 | 23 | +77 | 62 | Promotion to the 1968–69 First Division |
| 2 | Arbroath | 36 | 24 | 5 | 7 | 87 | 34 | +53 | 53 | Promotion to the 1968–69 First Division |
| 3 | East Fife | 36 | 21 | 7 | 8 | 71 | 47 | +24 | 49 | |
| 4 | Queen's Park | 36 | 20 | 8 | 8 | 76 | 47 | +29 | 48 | |
| 5 | Ayr United | 36 | 18 | 6 | 12 | 69 | 48 | +21 | 42 | |
| 6 | Queen of the South | 36 | 16 | 6 | 14 | 73 | 57 | +16 | 38 | |
| 7 | Forfar Athletic | 36 | 14 | 10 | 12 | 57 | 63 | −6 | 38 | |
| 8 | Albion Rovers | 36 | 14 | 9 | 13 | 62 | 55 | +7 | 37 | |
| 9 | Clydebank | 36 | 13 | 8 | 15 | 62 | 73 | −11 | 34 | |
| 10 | Dumbarton | 36 | 11 | 11 | 14 | 63 | 74 | −11 | 33 | |
| 11 | Hamilton Academical | 36 | 13 | 7 | 16 | 49 | 58 | −9 | 33 | |
| 12 | Cowdenbeath | 36 | 12 | 8 | 16 | 57 | 62 | −5 | 32 | |
| 13 | Montrose | 36 | 10 | 11 | 15 | 54 | 64 | −10 | 31 | |
| 14 | Berwick Rangers | 36 | 13 | 4 | 19 | 34 | 54 | −20 | 30 | |
| 15 | East Stirlingshire | 36 | 9 | 10 | 17 | 61 | 74 | −13 | 28 | |
| 16 | Brechin City | 36 | 8 | 12 | 16 | 45 | 62 | −17 | 28 | |
| 17 | Alloa Athletic | 36 | 11 | 6 | 19 | 42 | 69 | −27 | 28 | |
| 18 | Stranraer | 36 | 8 | 4 | 24 | 41 | 80 | −39 | 20 | |
| 19 | Stenhousemuir | 36 | 7 | 6 | 23 | 34 | 93 | −59 | 20 | |

Source: "1967-1968 Second Division - SPFL Archive". SPFL.

Promoted: St Mirren, Arbroath

== Cup honours ==
| Competition | Winner | Score | Runner-up |
|---|---|---|---|
| Scottish Cup 1967–68 | Dunfermline Athletic | 3 – 1 | Heart of Midlothian |
| League Cup 1967–68 | Celtic | 5 – 3 | Dundee |
| Junior Cup | Johnstone Burgh | 4 – 3 (rep.) | Glenrothes |

== Other honours ==
=== National ===
| Competition | Winner | Score | Runner-up |
|---|---|---|---|
| Scottish Qualifying Cup – North | Nairn County | 4 – 2 * | Fraserburgh |
| Scottish Qualifying Cup – South | Glasgow University | 4 – 1 * | St Cuthbert Wanderers |

=== County ===
| Competition | Winner | Score | Runner-up |
|---|---|---|---|
| Aberdeenshire Cup | Peterhead | | |
| East of Scotland Shield | Hibernian | 1 – 0 † | Hearts |
| Fife Cup | Raith Rovers | 4 – 3 * | East Fife |
| Forfarshire Cup | Dundee United | | Dundee |
| Glasgow Cup | Celtic | 8 – 0 | Clyde |
| Lanarkshire Cup | Airdrie | 3 – 2 | Albion Rovers |
| Renfrewshire Cup | Morton | 4 – 2 * | St Mirren |
| Stirlingshire Cup | Falkirk | 3 – 0 | Stirling Albion |

^{*} – aggregate over two legs
† – replay

=== Highland League ===
Top Three
| Pos | Team | Pld | W | D | L | GF | GA | GD | Pts |
|---|---|---|---|---|---|---|---|---|---|
| 1 | Elgin City | 30 | 26 | 3 | 1 | 117 | 28 | +89 | 55 |
| 2 | Ross County | 30 | 22 | 5 | 3 | 82 | 35 | +47 | 49 |
| 3 | Inverness Caledonian | 30 | 22 | 3 | 5 | 120 | 45 | +75 | 47 |

== Individual honours ==
| Award | Winner | Club |
|---|---|---|
| Footballer of the Year | (Scotland) Gordon Wallace | Raith Rovers |

== Scotland national team ==
| Date | Venue | Opponents | Score | Competition | Scotland scorer(s) |
|---|---|---|---|---|---|
| 21 October 1967 | Windsor Park, Belfast (A) | Northern Ireland | 0–1 | BHC / ECQG8 | |
| 22 November 1967 | Hampden Park, Glasgow (H) | Wales | 3–2 | BHC / ECQG8 | Alan Gilzean (2), Ronnie McKinnon |
| 24 February 1968 | Hampden Park, Glasgow (H) | England | 1–1 | BHC / ECQG8 | John Hughes |
| 30 May 1968 | Olympisch Stadion, Amsterdam (A) | Netherlands | 0–0 | Friendly | |

1968 British Home Championship – Runners Up

Key:

- (H) = Home match
- (A) = Away match
- ECQG8 = European Championship qualifying – Group 8
- BHC = British Home Championship
