= 1967–68 British Home Championship =

Tournament details
- Dates: 21 October 1967 – 28 February 1968
- Teams: 4
- Venue: 5 (in 5 host cities)

Final positions
- Champions: England (43rd title)
- Runners-up: Scotland

Tournament statistics
- Matches played: 6
- Goals scored: 15 (2.5 per match)
- Attendance: 384,710 (64,118 per match)
- Top scorer(s): (England) Bobby Charlton (England) Martin Peters (Scotland) Alan Gilzean (2 goals each)

The 1967–68 British Home Championship was the 1967–68 staging of an annual football competition for the British Home Nations. In addition, the results were combined with those of the previous season's championship to form qualifying Group 8 for the 1968 European Championship.

The tournament was a single round-robin with two points for a win and no ranking tiebreakers like goal difference. England won their first two games, against Wales and Ireland, and going into the final match they were guaranteed at least a share of the Home Championship, but a win for Scotland would see them win the Euro qualifying group. A hard-fought draw gave both titles outright to England. Ireland had surprisingly beat Scotland, but shared third place with Wales after losing to them in the last match.

== Table ==
Pos	Team	Pld	W	D	L	GF	GA	GD	Pts	Final result
1	England (C)	3	2	1	0	6	1	+5	5	Champions
2	Scotland	3	1	1	1	4	4	0	3	
3	Wales	3	1	0	2	4	6	−2	2	
4	Ireland	3	1	0	2	1	4	−3	2	

Source: EU-Football
Rules for classification: Tiebreakers
(C) Champions

== Results ==
21 October 1967
15:00

Wales	0–3	England
	Report	Peters 34'; B. Charlton 87'; Ball 90' (pen.)

Ninian Park, Cardiff
Attendance: 44,960
Referee: John Robertson P. Gordon (Scotland)
21 October 1967
15:00

Ireland	1–0	Scotland
Clements 69'	Report

Windsor Park, Belfast
Attendance: 47,359
Referee: James Finney (England)

22 November 1967
19:45

England	2–0	Ireland
Hurst 43'; B. Charlton 62'	Report

Wembley Stadium, London
Attendance: 83,969
Referee: Leo Callaghan (Wales)
22 November 1967
20:00

Scotland	3–2	Wales
Gilzean 16', 65'; McKinnon 78'	Report	R. Davies 18'; Durban 57'

Hampden Park, Glasgow
Attendance: 57,472
Referee: James Finney (England)

24 February 1968
15:00

Scotland	1–1	England
Hughes 39'	Report	Peters 19'

Hampden Park, Glasgow
Attendance: 134,461
Referee: Laurens van Ravens (Netherlands)
28 February 1968
19:15

Wales	2–0	Ireland
Rees 75'; W. Davies 84'	Report

Racecourse Ground, Wrexham
Attendance: 17,548
Referee: Robert Holley Davidson (Scotland)
