= 1966–67 British Home Championship =

Tournament details
- Dates: 22 October 1966 – 15 April 1967
- Teams: 4
- Venue: 4 (in 4 host cities)

Final positions
- Champions: Scotland (36th title)
- Runners-up: England

Tournament statistics
- Matches played: 6
- Goals scored: 18 (3 per match)
- Attendance: 318,533 (53,089 per match)
- Top scorer: (England) Geoff Hurst (3 goals)

The 1966–67 British Home Championship has remained famous in the memories of British Home Nations football fans ever since the dramatic and climactic match at Wembley Stadium, where an unfancied Scottish team beat England on the same turf they had won the 1966 FIFA World Cup a year before. England had comfortably disposed of Wales and Ireland in the earlier matches, whilst Scotland had struggled, drawing with Wales and only just beating the Irish. In the final match however, the Scots outplayed their illustrious opponents who were effectively reduced to 10 men with Jack Charlton hobbling and no substitutes allowed claiming a 3–2 victory, thus becoming "World Champions" in the words of many enthusiastic Scottish supporters, who invaded and stole much of the pitch after the game. In contrast to later pitch invasions, this was non-violent and resulted in no significant police action. The "World Champions" idea has since taken more tangible form in the Unofficial Football World Championships.

The results of the 1966–67 championship and 1967–68 championship combined to form qualifying Group 8 for the 1968 UEFA European Football Championship, with England edging out Scotland to qualify for the Euro quarter-finals.

== Table ==
Pos	Team	Pld	W	D	L	GF	GA	GD	Pts	Final result
1	Scotland (C)	3	2	1	0	6	4	+2	5	Champions
2	England	3	2	0	1	9	4	+5	4	
3	Wales	3	0	2	1	2	6	−4	2	
4	Ireland	3	0	1	2	1	4	−3	1	

Source: EU-Football
Rules for classification: Tiebreakers
(C) Champions

== Results ==
22 October 1966

Wales	1–1	Scotland
R. Davies 77'	Report	Law 86'

Ninian Park, Cardiff
Attendance: 33,269
Referee: Ken Dagnall (England)
22 October 1966
15:00

Ireland	0–2	England
	Report	Hunt 40'; Peters 60'

Windsor Park, Belfast
Attendance: 47,897
Referee: Robert Holley Davidson (Scotland)

16 November 1966
20:00

Scotland	2–1	Ireland
Murdoch 14'; Lennox 35'	Report	Nicholson 9'

Hampden Park, Glasgow
Attendance: 45,281
Referee: John Keith Taylor (England)
16 November 1966

England	5–1	Wales
Hurst 30', 34'; B. Charlton 43'; Hennessey 65' (o.g.); J. Charlton 84'	Report	W. Davies 36'

Wembley Stadium, London
Attendance: 75,380
Referee: Thomas Wharton (Scotland)

12 April 1967
19:30

Ireland	0–0	Wales
	Report

Windsor Park, Belfast
Attendance: 17,643
Referee: Kevin Howley (England)
15 April 1967
15:00

England	2–3	Scotland
J. Charlton 84'; Hurst 88'	Report	Law 27'; Lennox 78'; McCalliog 87'

Wembley Stadium, London
Attendance: 99,063
Referee: Gerhard Schulenburg (West Germany)
