= Jan Karlsson =

Jan Karlsson may refer to:

- Jan O. Karlsson (1939–2016), Swedish politician
- Jan Karlsson (cyclist) (born 1966), Swedish Olympic cyclist
- Jan Karlsson (footballer) (born 1940), Swedish footballer that has played for Djurgården
- Jan Karlsson (wrestler) (born 1945), Swedish Olympic wrestler
- Jan Karlsson (swimmer), Swedish swimmer in 1991 European Sprint Swimming Championships

== See also ==
- Janne Karlsson (disambiguation)
- Jan Carlzon (born 1941), Swedish businessman
