= 1967 Ballon d'Or =

Annual association football award event in France

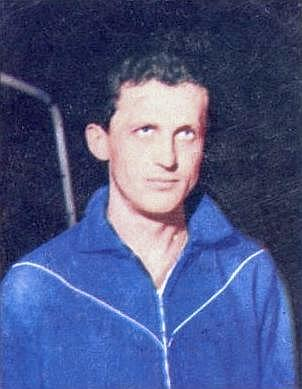
- 1967 Ballon d'Or winner, Flórián Albert
- Date: 26 December 1967
- Location: Paris, France
- Presented by: France Football

Highlights
- Won by: (Hungary) Flórián Albert (1st award)
- Website: ballondor.com

The 1967 Ballon d'Or, given to the best football player in Europe as judged by a panel of sports journalists from UEFA member countries, was awarded to Flórián Albert on 26 December 1967.

== Rankings ==
Rank	Name	Club(s)	Nationality	Points
1	Flórián Albert	(Hungary) Ferencváros	Hungary	68
2	Bobby Charlton	(England) Manchester United	England	40
3	Jimmy Johnstone	(Scotland) Celtic	Scotland	39
4	Franz Beckenbauer	(Germany) Bayern Munich	West Germany	37
5	Eusébio	(Portugal) Benfica	Portugal	26
6	Tommy Gemmell	(Scotland) Celtic	Scotland	21
7	Gerd Müller	(Germany) Bayern Munich	West Germany	19
8	George Best	(England) Manchester United	Northern Ireland	18
9	Igor Chislenko	(Soviet Union) Dynamo Moscow	Soviet Union	9
10	János Farkas	(Hungary) Vasas	Hungary	8
10	Sandro Mazzola	(Italy) Internazionale	Italy	8
10	Pirri	(Spain) Real Madrid	Spain	8
13	Gigi Riva	(Italy) Cagliari	Italy	6
13	Eduard Streltsov	(Soviet Union) Torpedo Moscow	Soviet Union	6
15	Anatoliy Byshovets	(Soviet Union) Dynamo Kyiv	Soviet Union	5
16	Alan Ball	(England) Everton	England	4
16	Helmut Haller	(Germany) Bologna	West Germany	4
16	Włodzimierz Lubański	(Poland) Górnik Zabrze	Poland	4
16	Gianni Rivera	(Italy) Milan	Italy	4
20	Zvezdan Čebinac	(Netherlands) PSV Eindhoven (Germany) 1. FC Nürnberg	Yugoslavia	3
20	Giacinto Facchetti	(Italy) Internazionale	Italy	3
20	Geoff Hurst	(England) West Ham United	England	3
20	Wolfgang Overath	(Germany) 1. FC Köln	West Germany	3
20	Paul Van Himst	(Belgium) Anderlecht	Belgium	3
25	Nikola Kotkov	(Bulgaria) Lokomotiv Sofia	Bulgaria	2
25	Valery Voronin	(Soviet Union) Torpedo Moscow	Soviet Union	2
27	José Augusto	(Portugal) Benfica	Portugal	1
27	Johnny Bjerregaard	(Austria) Rapid Wien	Denmark	1
27	Néstor Combin	(Italy) Torino	France	1
27	Johan Cruyff	(Netherlands) Ajax	Netherlands	1
27	Pedro de Felipe	(Spain) Real Madrid	Spain	1
27	Louis Pilot	(Belgium) Standard Liège	Luxembourg	1
27	Ove Kindvall	(Netherlands) Feyenoord	Sweden	1
27	Zygfryd Szołtysik	(Poland) Górnik Zabrze	Poland	1

Source: France Football
