= Ingvar Svensson (footballer) =

Swedish footballer and manager

Personal information
- Full name: Ingvar Svensson
- Date of birth: 16 December 1939 (age 86)
- Place of birth: Sweden
- Position: Midfielder

Senior career*
Years	Team	Apps	(Gls)
1957–1960	Mölnlycke IF		
1960–1968	IFK Göteborg	147	(27)
1969–1971	Tranås BoIS		
1972–1973	Åtvidabergs FF		

International career
	Sweden U21	1	(0)
	Sweden B	2	(0)
1966–1967	Sweden	6	(1)

Managerial career
- 1974–1976: Jönköpings Södra IF
- 1977–1979: Åtvidabergs FF
- * Club domestic league appearances and goals

Ingvar Svensson (born 16 December 1939) is a Swedish former footballer and manager who played as a midfielder and made six appearances for the Sweden national team.

== Club career ==
In his last two seasons before retiring as a player, Svensson twice was Swedish football champion with Åtvidabergs FF, winning the Allsvenskan of 1972 and 1973.

== International career ==
Svensson made his debut for Sweden on 5 October 1966 in a friendly match against Austria, which finished as a 4–1 win. He went on to make six appearances, scoring one goal, before making his last appearance on 25 June 1967 in a 1964–67 Nordic Football Championship match against Denmark, which finished as a 1–1 draw.

== Managerial career ==
After retiring as a player, Svensson became manager of Jönköpings Södra IF from 1974 to 1976. In 1977, he became manager of Åtvidabergs FF where he remained until 1979, leading the club to promotion to the Allsvenskan in his first season.

== Career statistics ==
=== International ===
Sweden
Year	Apps	Goals
1966	3	0
1967	3	1
Total	6	1

=== International goals ===
No.	Date	Venue	Opponent	Score	Result	Competition
1	1 June 1967	Råsunda Stadium, Solna, Sweden	Portugal	1–1	1–1	UEFA Euro 1968 qualifying

== Honours ==
=== Club ===
Åtvidabergs FF

- Allsvenskan: 1972, 1973
