= 1966 Nemzeti Bajnokság I =

Nemzeti Bajnokság I
- Season: 1966
- Country: Hungary
- Teams: 14
- Champions: Vasas SC
- Runner up: Ferencvárosi TC
- Relegated: Ózdi Kohász SE; Dorogi Bányász SC
- Top goalscorer: János Farkas (25)

The 1966 season was the 64th completed season of Nemzeti Bajnokság I.

== Overview ==
It was contested by 14 teams, and Vasas SC won the championship.

== League standings ==
Pos	Team	Pld	W	D	L	GF	GA	GR	Pts
1	Vasas SC	26	17	9	0	67	27	2.481	43
2	Ferencvárosi TC	26	16	5	5	71	33	2.152	37
3	FC Tatabánya	26	12	8	6	41	18	2.278	32
4	Újpesti Dózsa	26	13	6	7	67	39	1.718	32
5	Győri ETO FC	26	11	9	6	38	29	1.310	31
6	Budapest Honvéd FC	26	14	3	9	46	43	1.070	31
7	Pécsi Dózsa	26	8	13	5	29	30	0.967	29
8	Csepel SC	26	10	7	9	32	37	0.865	27
9	Diósgyőri VTK	26	10	4	12	30	31	0.968	24
10	MTK Budapest FC	26	7	6	13	28	49	0.571	20
11	Salgótarjáni BTC	26	6	6	14	24	40	0.600	18
12	Dunaújváros FC	26	4	9	13	19	37	0.514	17
13	Ózdi Kohász SE	26	4	4	18	31	73	0.425	12
14	Dorogi Bányasz	26	2	7	17	24	61	0.393	11

Source: rsssf.com

== Results ==
Home \ Away	CSE	DIÓ	DOR	DUN	FTC	HON	MTK	ÓZD	PÉC	GYŐ	SAL	TAT	VAS	ÚJP
Csepel		2–1	1–1	3–2	1–1	1–2	2–0	3–1	1–1	1–1	1–0	1–0	1–5	2–0
Diósgyőr	2–0		2–0	0–0	1–0	2–0	0–1	2–2	2–0	1–0	2–0	0–2	0–1	3–1
Dorogi Bányász	1–1	1–4		1–1	1–3	0–3	0–0	4–2	1–2	1–1	1–0	1–4	0–0	2–2
Dunaújvárosi Kohász	0–3	0–2	2–1		1–2	1–3	0–0	3–2	1–1	1–1	0–0	0–0	0–0	2–2
Ferencváros	4–1	5–1	3–1	2–0		3–1	7–1	4–2	3–0	0–1	5–1	1–1	0–3	5–2
Budapest Honvéd	1–2	1–0	3–2	2–1	3–2		3–0	2–0	1–3	3–0	2–1	1–0	3–3	0–0
MTK Budapest	0–0	1–0	6–0	2–1	0–1	2–0		2–0	2–2	2–1	1–3	0–0	2–3	2–4
Ózdi Kohász	2–3	3–3	1–0	1–2	0–6	4–4	3–1		1–2	0–1	1–0	2–0	0–1	2–5
Pécsi Dózsa	3–2	0–0	3–1	2–0	0–0	0–1	0–0	2–0		0–0	0–1	0–0	1–1	2–0
Rába ETO Győr	1–0	1–0	2–0	1–0	2–0	6–1	4–1	5–1	1–1		3–1	1–5	1–3	1–1
Salgótarján	0–0	2–0	2–1	0–1	0–3	1–4	4–0	4–0	0–0	0–0		1–1	0–0	1–4
Tatabányai Bányász	1–0	2–1	3–1	1–0	2–2	3–0	4–1	0–0	7–0	0–0	4–1		0–2	1–0
Vasas	2–0	3–1	4–1	4–0	4–4	3–2	4–1	7–1	2–2	3–3	1–0	1–0		4–1
Újpesti Dózsa	5–0	3–0	6–1	1–0	3–5	3–0	3–0	7–0	2–2	3–0	5–1	1–0	3–3	

Source: rsssf.com
Legend: Blue = home team win; Yellow = draw; Red = away team win.

== Statistical leaders ==
=== Top goalscorers ===
Rank	Scorer	Club	Goals
1	(Hungary) János Farkas	Vasas SC	25
2	(Hungary) Flórián Albert	Ferencvárosi TC	24
2	(Hungary) Ferenc Bene	Újpesti Dózsa SC	24
4	(Hungary) Lajos Puskás	Vasas SC	20
5	(Hungary) Antal Dunai	Újpesti Dózsa	15
6	(Hungary) Tivadar Monostori	Dorogi Bányász	13
7	(Hungary) Tibor Csernai	Tatabányai Bányász	11
7	(Hungary) Antal Szuromi	Tatabányai Bányász	11
9	(Hungary) Lajos Kocsis	Salgótarjáni BTC	10

== Attendances ==
#	Club	Average
1	Ferencváros	29,846
2	Budapest Honvéd	17,154
3	Újpest	15,846
4	Diósgyör	15,615
5	MTK	15,462
6	Vasas	13,462
7	Csepel	11,154
8	Pécsi Dósza	8,769
9	Tatabánya	8,231
10	Dunaújváros	7,538
11	Győr	7,385
12	Salgótarján	6,692
13	Ózd	6,192
14	Dorog	3,962
