= Janne Karlsson =

Janne Karlsson is the name of:

- Janne Karlsson (ice hockey, born 1958), Swedish ice hockey coach born in Växjö
- Janne Karlsson (ice hockey, born 1964), Swedish ice hockey coach born in Kiruna
- Janne Carlsson or Karlsson (1937–2017), Swedish actor

== See also ==
- Jan Karlsson (disambiguation)
