= Inge Danielsson =

Swedish footballer (1941–2021)

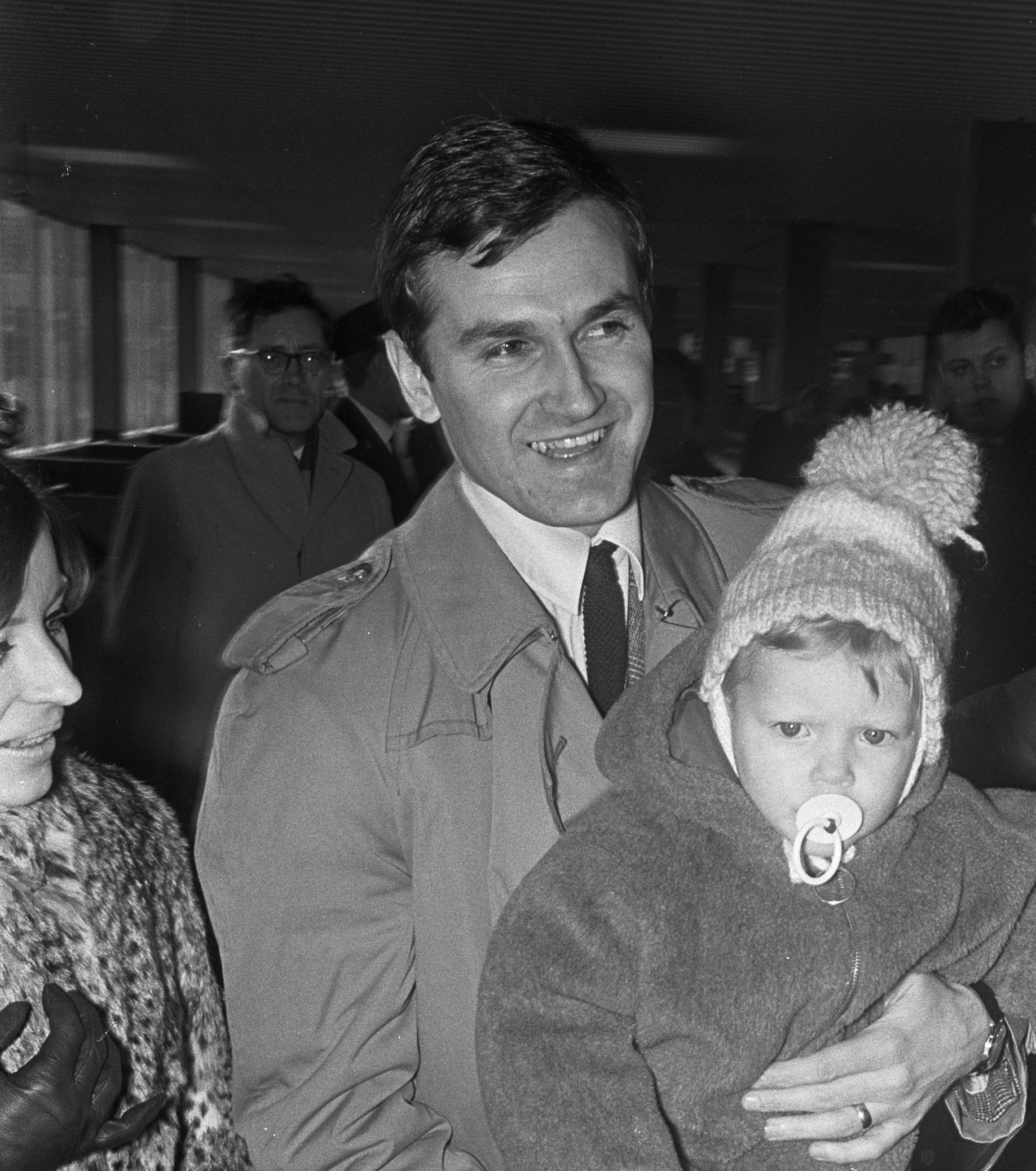
- Danielsson with family in 1968

Personal information
- Full name: Karl Gustaf Inge Danielsson
- Date of birth: 14 June 1941
- Place of birth: Bromölla, Sweden
- Date of death: 30 June 2021 (aged 80)
- Place of death: Åhus, Sweden
- Position: Forward

Senior career*
Years	Team	Apps	(Gls)
1961–1966	Ifö Bromölla IF		
1967	Helsingborgs IF	22	(11)
1968–1969	Ajax	27	(21)
1969–1972	Helsingborgs IF		
1973	IFK Norrköping	6	(0)
1974–1975	Ifö Bromölla IF		

International career
1966–1971	Sweden	17	(8)
- * Club domestic league appearances and goals

Karl Gustaf Inge Danielsson (14 June 1941 – 30 June 2021) was a Swedish footballer who played as a forward. He played for Ifö/Bromölla IF, Helsingborgs IF, AFC Ajax and IFK Norrköping. Danielsson also won 17 caps for the Sweden national team, scoring 8 goals.

== Club career ==
Danielson signed to play with Helsingborgs IF in the Allsvenskan in 1967. In 1968, Danielsson signed on to play professionally with AFC Ajax and he became a large part of the club's third straight league title. Danielsson came at the end of the season and managed to score nine goals. Danielsson also played in the 1969 European Cup Final against fellow Swede Kurt Hamrin's AC Milan, losing 4–1.

Danielsson scored several important goals both in the Eredivisie and the European Cups, but after a little more than a year returned to Helsingborg, playing in the lower Swedish divisions. In 1973, he swapped clubs to IFK Norrköping where he spent another year in the highest Swedish division before ending his career where it started, with Ifö/Bromölla IF.

== International career ==
Danielsson made his debut for the Sweden national team during his time in Ifö/Bromölla IF who then played in the Swedish second division. The debut came against Denmark at Råsunda stadium, 6 November 1966 where Danielsson scored the game-winning goal (2–1).

He is most known for scoring two goals against Portugal in November 1966, in the European Championship qualifier.

== Personal life ==
After ending his football career Danielsson ran a flooring business until his retirement.

== Career statistics ==
Appearances and goals by national team and year
National team	Year	Apps	Goals
Sweden	1966	2	3
Sweden	1967	7	2
Sweden	1968	0	0
Sweden	1969	1	2
Sweden	1970	5	1
Sweden	1971	2	0
Total		17	8

Scores and results list Sweden's goal tally first, score column indicates score after each Danielsson goal.

List of international goals scored by Inge Danielsson
No.	Date	Venue	Opponent	Score	Result	Competition	Ref.
1	6 November 1966	Råsunda, Stockholm, Sweden	Denmark	2–1	2–1	1964–67 Nordic Football Championship	
2	13 November 1966	Estadio Nacional, Lisbon, Portugal	Portugal	1–1	2–1	UEFA Euro 1968 qualification	
3	13 November 1966	Estadio Nacional, Lisbon, Portugal	Portugal	2–1	2–1	UEFA Euro 1968 qualification	
4	10 August 1967	Råsunda, Stockholm, Sweden	Finland	2–0	2–0	1964–67 Nordic Football Championship	
5	5 November 1967	Råsunda, Stockholm, Sweden	Norway	2–0	5–2	1964–67 Nordic Football Championship	
6	25 August 1969	Råsunda, Stockholm, Sweden	Israel	1–1	3–1	Friendly	
7	13 September 1970	Ullevaal Stadion, Oslo, Sweden	Finland	1–1	4–2	1968–71 Nordic Football Championship	

== Honours ==
Ajax

- Eredivisie: 1967–68
- European Cup runners-up: 1968–69
