= Asko Mäkilä =

Finnish footballer (1944–2012)

Personal information
- Date of birth: 20 August 1944
- Date of death: 2 February 2012 (aged 67)
- Position: Midfielder

International career
Years	Team	Apps	(Gls)
1965–1966	Finland	4	(2)

Asko Mäkilä (20 August 1944 – 2 February 2012) was a Finnish footballer who played as a midfielder. He made four appearances for the Finland national team from 1965 to 1966.
