= Tommy Lindholm =

Finnish footballer and coach (born 1947)

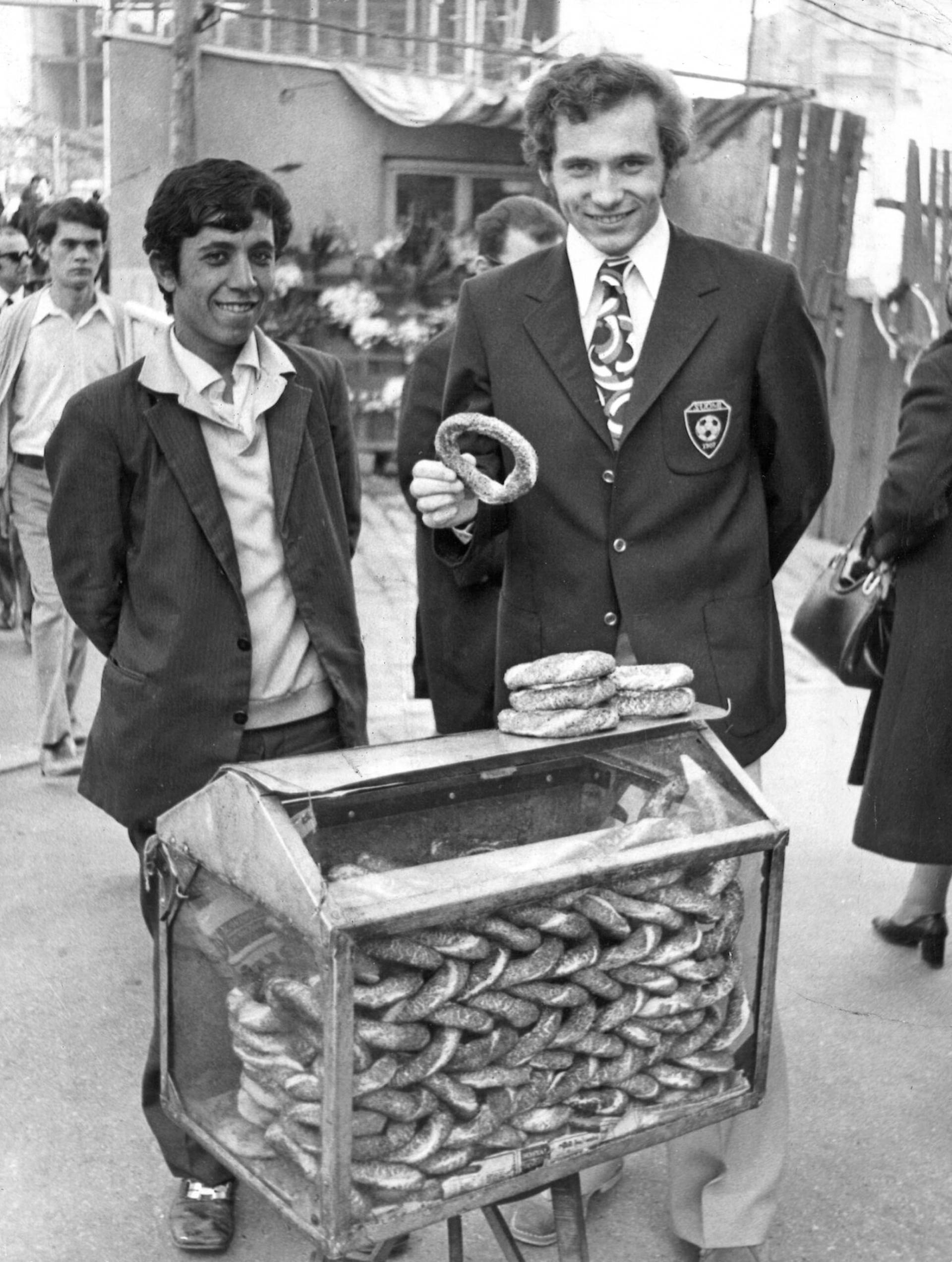
- Tommy Lindholm (right) in Istanbul, 1971, with a simit seller.

Personal information
- Date of birth: 3 February 1947 (age 79)
- Place of birth: Pargas, Finland
- Height: 1.83 m (6 ft 0 in)
- Position: Striker

Senior career*
Years	Team	Apps	(Gls)
1961–1964	PIF		
1965	TuTo	-	(24)
1966–1968	TPS	60	(55)
1969–1970	HIFK	-	(35)
1971	Reipas	25	(13)
1971–1972	Beşiktaş	29	(10)
1973–1978	TPS	106	(13)
1979–1980	TuPa		

International career
1965–1974	Finland	43	(11)

Managerial career
- 1978: TPS
- 1986–1988: TPS
- 1991: TPS
- 1993–1994: Finland
- 1996: HJK Helsinki
- * Club domestic league appearances and goals

Tommy Lindholm (born 3 February 1947) is a Finnish former footballer. He was the head coach of the Finland national football team from 1993 to 1994. He also coached TPS (1978, 1986–1988, 1991) and HJK (1996).

He earned 43 caps at international level between 1965 and 1974, scoring 11 goals.

At club level Lindholm played for PIF, TuTo, TPS, HIFK, Reipas, Beşiktaş and TuPa.

== Honours ==
- Finnish Championship: 1968, 1975
- Mestaruussarja Top Scorer: 1967, 1968
