= Sven Otto Birkeland =

Norwegian footballer (born 1948)

Personal information
- Full name: Sven Otto Birkeland
- Date of birth: 10 February 1948 (age 78)
- Place of birth: Kristiansand, Norway
- Position: Forward

Youth career
- FK Vigør

Senior career*
Years	Team	Apps	(Gls)
1969-1973	Lyn Fotball	5	(0)
1973-1978	IK Start	11	(0)
1978-1986	FK Jerv		

International career
1964-?	Norway U19	9	(12)
1970-?	Norway U21	5	(0)
1967-?	Norway	5	(1)
- * Club domestic league appearances and goals

Sven Otto Birkeland (born 10 February 1948) is a Norwegian former professional footballer who played as a midfielder for the Norwegian national senior and junior teams.

Birkeland was born in Kristiansand. He played as a midfielder for Start from 1973–78, and won the league in 1978. He began his career at Vigør and played for Lyn from 1969 to 1973. He also played for Jerv and was the coach of Donn. Birkeland was the match winner against Bodø/Glimt when Start's first league title was secured on 15 October 1978.

He has five caps and one goal for the Norway national team, and made his debut against Sweden in 1967, becoming the first Sørlending to play for Norway.

Birkeland is the father of the former Start player Bernt Christian Birkeland.

== Career statistics ==
Score and result list Norway's goal tally first, score column indicates score after Birkeland goal.

International goal scored by Sven Otto Birkeland
No.	Date	Venue	Opponent	Score	Result	Competition
1	Ullevaal Stadion, Oslo, Norway	3 September 1967	Sweden		3–1	UEFA Euro 1968 qualifying
