= Edin Sprečo =

Bosnian footballer (1947–2020)

Personal information
- Full name: Edin Sprečo
- Date of birth: 19 April 1947
- Place of birth: Sarajevo, FPR Yugoslavia
- Date of death: 12 May 2020 (aged 73)
- Place of death: Sarajevo, Bosnia and Herzegovina
- Position: Striker

Youth career
- 1959–1964: Željezničar

Senior career*
Years	Team	Apps	(Gls)
1964–1975	Željezničar	199	(61)
1975–1976	NAC Breda	25	(7)
1976–1977	Željezničar	4	(0)
1977–1979	Rennes	35	(18)
1979–1981	Iskra Bugojno	38	(9)
Total		301	(95)

International career
1967–1969	Yugoslavia	3	(2)
- * Club domestic league appearances and goals

Edin Sprečo (19 April 1947 – 12 May 2020) was a Bosnian professional footballer who played as a winger.

== Club career ==
Born in Sarajevo, SFR Yugoslavia, present day Bosnia and Herzegovina, Sprečo started playing football for the youth team of hometown club Željezničar when he was 12. At the age of 17, he made his debut for the first team. Sprečo scored two goals in his first game and it was clear that he would become a great player.

He played 199 league games and scored 61 goals for Željezničar. In total, Sprečo played in 234 games and managed to score 75 goals. He was a member of the Željezničar team that won the Yugoslav First League title in the 1971–72 season. In 1975, Sprečo turned 28 and he was allowed to go abroad, as it was prohibited for under-28 players to leave the domestic clubs at the time. He went to Dutch Eredivisie club NAC Breda. He played in Holland alongside compatriots Miroslav Vardić and Nikola Budišić, finishing in 11th place in the Eredivisie.

He also played for, at the time, French Ligue 2 club Rennes making his debut against AS Brestoise on 8 January 1978. Sprečo finished his career at the age of 34 in 1981, while playing for Iskra Bugojno.

== International career ==
Sprečo earned 3 caps for the Yugoslavia national team and also scored two goals while playing for the national team from 1967 to 1969. He scored his first goal for Yugoslavia on 12 November 1967, in a 4–0 win against Albania in a UEFA Euro 1968 qualifying match. His final international was a June 1969 World Cup qualification match away against Finland.

== Career statistics ==
=== Club ===
Appearances and goals by club, season and competition
Club	Season	League			Cup		Continental		Total	
Club	Season	Division	Apps	Goals	Apps	Goals	Apps	Goals	Apps	Goals
Željezničar	1964–65	Yugoslav First League	2	0	—		—		2	0
Željezničar	1965–66	Yugoslav First League	2	0	—		—		2	0
Željezničar	1966–67	Yugoslav First League	19	7	—		—		19	7
Željezničar	1967–68	Yugoslav First League	26	13	—		—		26	13
Željezničar	1968–69	Yugoslav First League	24	12	—		—		24	12
Željezničar	1969–70	Yugoslav First League	6	0	—		—		6	0
Željezničar	1970–71	Yugoslav First League	33	7	—		—		33	7
Željezničar	1971–72	Yugoslav First League	32	5	—		8	4	40	9
Željezničar	1972–73	Yugoslav First League	31	10	—		2	1	33	11
Željezničar	1973–74	Yugoslav First League	15	7	—		—		15	7
Željezničar	1974–75	Yugoslav First League	7	0	—		—		7	0
Željezničar	1975–76	Yugoslav First League	2	0	—		—		2	0
Željezničar	Total		199	61	—		10	5	209	66
NAC Breda	1975–76	Eredivisie	25	7	1	0	—		26	7
Željezničar	1976–77	Yugoslav First League	4	0	0	0	—		4	0
Rennes	1977–78	Ligue 2	9	4	—		—		9	4
Rennes	1978–79	Ligue 2	26	14	—		—		26	14
Rennes	Total		35	18	—		—		35	18
Iskra Bugojno	1979–80	Yugoslav Second League	23	6	—		—		23	6
Iskra Bugojno	1980–81	Yugoslav Second League	15	3	—		—		15	3
Iskra Bugojno	Total		38	9	—		—		38	9
Career total			301	95	1	0	10	5	312	100

=== International ===
National team	Year	Apps	Goals
Yugoslavia
Yugoslavia	1967	2	1
Yugoslavia	1968	0	0
Yugoslavia	1969	1	1
Total		3	2

=== International goals ===
#	Date	Venue	Opponent	Score	Result	Competition
1.	12 November 1967	Stadion JNA, Belgrade, SFR Yugoslavia	Albania	1–0	4–0	UEFA Euro 1968 qualifying
2.	4 June 1969	Helsinki Olympic Stadium, Helsinki, Finland	Finland	4–1	5–1	1970 FIFA World Cup qualification

== Death ==
Sprečo died at the age of 73 in his hometown of Sarajevo, Bosnia and Herzegovina on 12 May 2020.

== Honours ==
=== Player ===
Željezničar

- Yugoslav First League: 1971–72
