= Dinko Dermendzhiev =

Bulgarian footballer and manager (1941–2019)

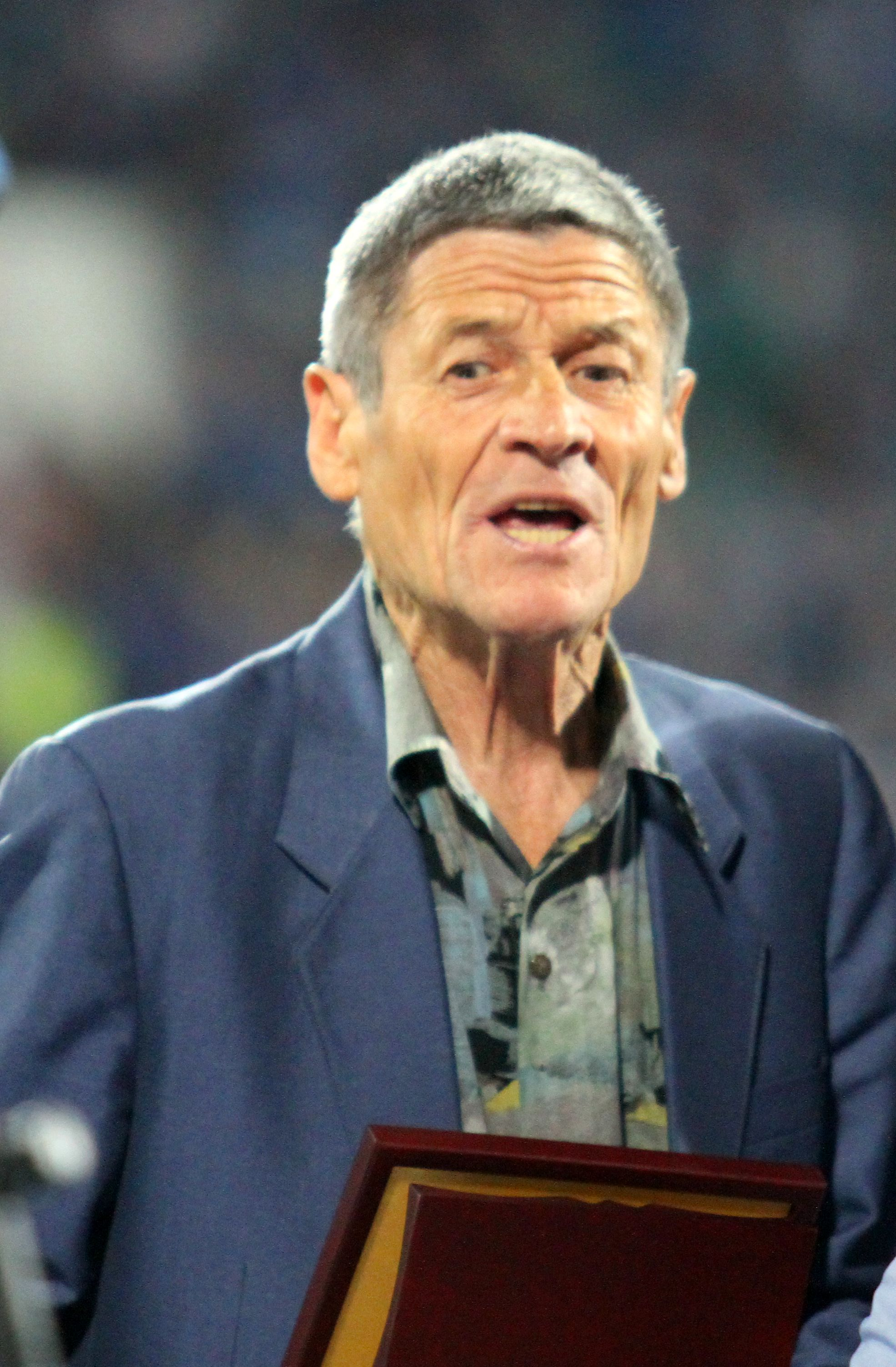
- Dermendzhiev in 2014

Personal information
- Full name: Dinko Tsvetkov Dermendzhiev
- Date of birth: 2 June 1941
- Place of birth: Plovdiv, Bulgaria
- Date of death: 1 May 2019 (aged 77)
- Place of death: Plovdiv, Bulgaria
- Position: Forward

Youth career
- Maritsa Plovdiv

Senior career*
Years	Team	Apps	(Gls)
1959–1978	Botev Plovdiv	447	(194)

International career
1962–1977	Bulgaria	58	(19)

Managerial career
- 1978–1979: Chepinets Velingrad
- 1979–1984: Botev Plovdiv
- 1984–1985: Shumen
- 1987–1988: Spartak Pleven
- 1989–1991: Botev Plovdiv
- 1991: Levski Sofia
- 1992: Hebar Pazardzhik
- 1992: Botev Plovdiv
- 1993: Botev Plovdiv
- 1996: Lokomotiv Plovdiv
- 1996: Lokomotiv Sofia
- 1997: Botev Plovdiv
- 1998–1999: Lokomotiv Plovdiv
- 2000: Botev Plovdiv
- 2001: Botev Plovdiv
- * Club domestic league appearances and goals

Dinko Tsvetkov Dermendzhiev (Bulgarian: Динко Цветков Дерменджиев; 2 June 1941 – 1 May 2019), nicknamed Chico was a Bulgarian footballer and coach.

== Club career ==
Dinko Dermendzhiev began his youth career in Maritsa Plovdiv. Initially, he played as a goalkeeper, although later he would be famed as a skillful and elegant forward.

Dermendzhiev spent his entire professional career with Botev Plovdiv, playing for the club for 19 years during the 1960s and 1970s. He participated in 447 matches in A Grupa and scored 194 goals for the club. Dermendzhiev would score twice in eight UEFA club competition games. He also holds the third place in the all time goalscorers ranking of A Grupa. Throughout his career Dermendzhiev scored seven hat-tricks.

== International career ==
He made 58 appearances for the Bulgaria national football team and scored 19 goals from 1966 to 1977. He participated at three editions of FIFA World Cup in 1962 (2 games), 1966 (2 games) and 1970 (2 games and 1 goal), scoring the opening goal of 1970 against Peru, which coincidentally took place on his birthday.

== Coaching career ==
The first team Dermendzhiev coached was Chepinets. He then took charge of Botev Plovdiv, leading the club to win the 1980–81 Bulgarian Cup. On 30 September 1981, under his guidance the club achieved a glorious 1–0 victory over FC Barcelona. Dermendzhiev would spend several spells in charge of Botev. He would also coach local rivals Lokomotiv Plovdiv, as well as Shumen, Lokomotiv Sofia, Spartak Pleven, Maritsa Plovdiv, Omonia Aradippou, Hebar Pazardzhik, Chernomorets Burgas, Bulgaria U21, and have a short spell at Levski Sofia where he achieved 8 wins and 2 draws in 1991.

== Honours ==
=== Club Honours ===
==== Player ====
- Bulgarian Cup: 1962, Runner-up: 1963, 1964
- A Grupa: 1967, Runner-up: 1963, 3rd place: 1961
- Balkans Cup: 1972

==== Manager ====
- Bulgarian Cup: 1981, Runner-up: 1984, 1991
- A Grupa 3rd place: 1981, 1983
- Balkans Cup Runner-up: 1981

=== Individual honours ===
- Best football player of Plovdiv: 1966, 1967, 1976
- Best football player of Botev Plovdiv for 20th century

== International goals ==
No.	Date	Venue	Opponent	Score	Result	Competition
1.	11 June 1967	Råsunda Stadion, Solna, Sweden	Sweden	2–0	2–0	UEFA Euro 1968 qualifying
2.	26 November 1967	Vasil Levski National Stadium, Sofia, Bulgaria	Portugal	1–0	1–0	UEFA Euro 1968 qualifying
3.	6 April 1968	Vasil Levski National Stadium, Sofia, Bulgaria	Italy	2–1	3–2	UEFA Euro 1968 quarter-finals
4.	15 June 1969	Vasil Levski National Stadium, Sofia, Bulgaria	Poland	2–0	4–1	1970 FIFA World Cup qualification
5.	7 December 1969	Stade Josy Barthel, Luxembourg City, Luxembourg	Luxembourg	1–0	3–1	1970 FIFA World Cup qualification
6.	2 June 1970	Estadio Nou Camp, León, Mexico	Peru	1–0	2–3	1970 FIFA World Cup

Sporting positions
Preceded by Pelé	FIFA World Cup opening goal 1970	Succeeded by Paul Breitner
