= Harri Järvi =

Finnish footballer (1939–2019)

Personal information
- Date of birth: 20 August 1939
- Place of birth: Vyborg, Finland
- Date of death: 21 February 2019 (aged 79)

International career
Years	Team	Apps	(Gls)
1964	Finland	5	(3)

Harri Järvi (20 August 1939 – 21 February 2019) was a Finnish footballer. He played in five matches for the Finland national football team in 1964.
