= Jørgen Jørgensen (footballer) =

Danish footballer (1943–2019)

Personal information
- Full name: Jørgen Ørting Jørgensen
- Date of birth: 1 April 1943
- Place of birth: Copenhagen, Denmark
- Date of death: 28 January 2019 (aged 75)
- Position: Forward

Senior career*
Years	Team	Apps	(Gls)
1963–1970	Holbæk B&I		
1970–1973	Sandvikens IF		
1973–1984	Holbæk B&I		

International career
1965–1966	Denmark U21	5	(3)
1966–1975	Denmark	9	(1)
- * Club domestic league appearances and goals

Jørgen Ørting Jørgensen (1 April 1943 – 28 January 2019) was a Danish footballer who played as a forward for Holbæk B&I and Swedish club Sandvikens IF. He made nine appearances for the Denmark national team from 1966 to 1975.
