= Miel Pijs =

Dutch footballer

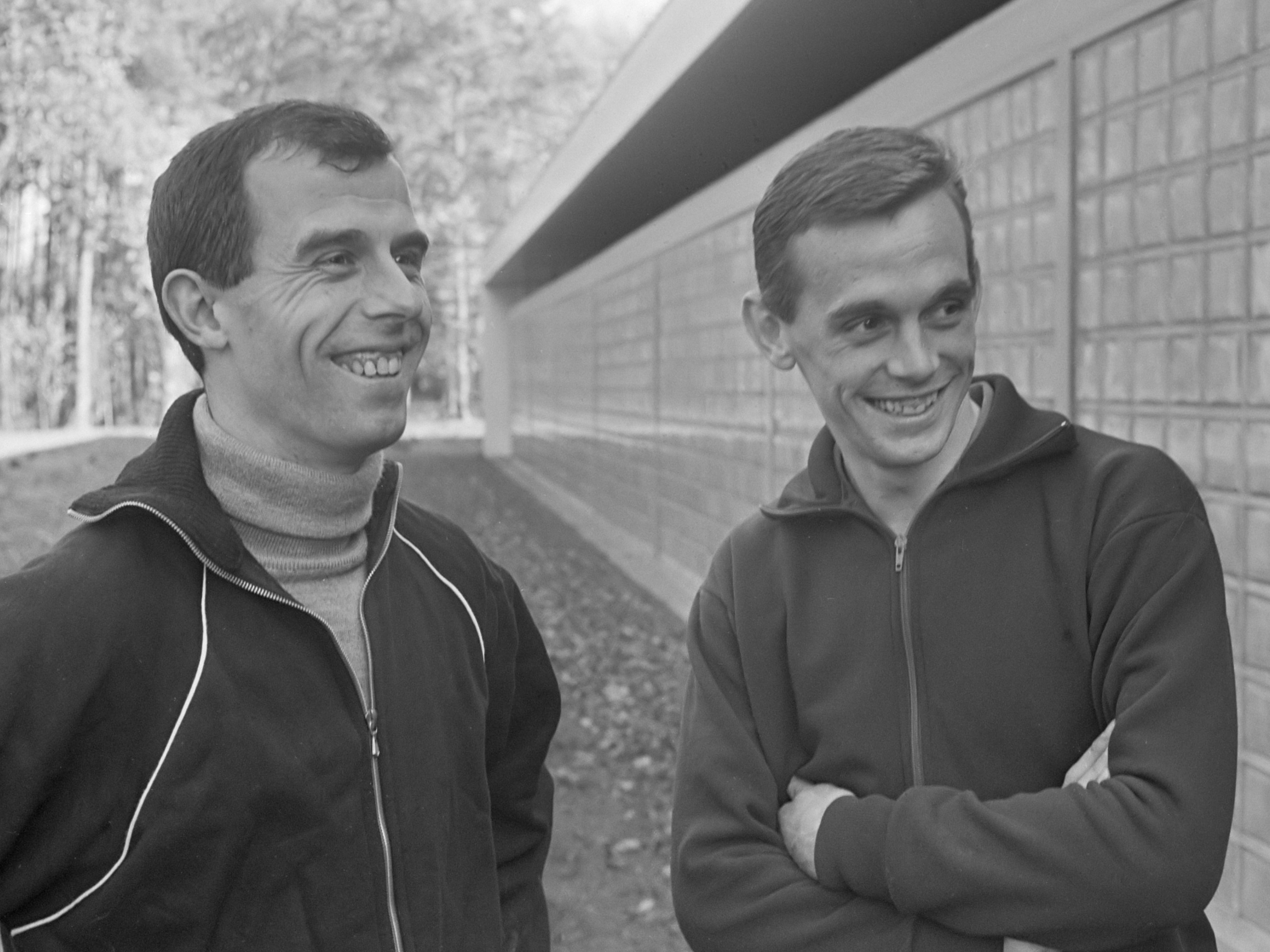
- Coen Moulijn and Miel Pijs (1965)

Personal information
- Full name: Emile Pijs
- Date of birth: 22 August 1941
- Place of birth: Valkenswaard, Netherlands
- Position: Defender

Youth career
- VV De Valk

Senior career*
Years	Team	Apps	(Gls)
1961–1967	PSV Eindhoven		
1967–1969	Sparta Rotterdam		
1969–1972	N.E.C.		
1972–1974	FC Den Bosch		
- EVV Eindhoven

International career
1965–1968	Netherlands	8	(1)
- * Club domestic league appearances and goals

Miel Pijs (born 22 August 1941) is a Dutch former footballer, who played at both professional and international levels as a defender.

== Club career ==
Born in Valkenswaard, Pijs began playing amateur football with his hometown club VV De Valk. In 1961, he turned professional by signing with PSV Eindhoven. Pijs played for PSV in the Eredivisie for six seasons before finishing his career with spells at Sparta Rotterdam, N.E.C., FC Den Bosch and EVV Eindhoven. He was a member of PSV's 1962–63 Eredivisie winning side.

== International career ==
Pijs made his debut for the Netherlands in a November 1965 FIFA World Cup qualification match against Switzerland. He would make a total of eight international appearances, scoring one goal against Hungary in the Netherlands' first match of UEFA Euro 1968 qualifying.
