= Josef Jurkanin =

Czech footballer

Personal information
- Full name: Josef Jurkanin
- Date of birth: 5 March 1949 (age 77)
- Place of birth: Prague, Czechoslovakia
- Position: Midfielder

Senior career*
Years	Team	Apps	(Gls)
1966–1975	AC Sparta Prague		
1975–1977	FK Teplice		
1977–1979	SK Slavia Prague	16	(3)

International career
1967–1975	Czechoslovakia	12	(2)
- * Club domestic league appearances and goals

Josef Jurkanin (born 5 March 1949) is a retired Czech footballer.

During his career, he played for AC Sparta Prague. He earned 12 caps for the Czechoslovakia national football team and participated in the 1970 FIFA World Cup.
