= Dezső Molnár =

Hungarian footballer

Personal information
- Date of birth: 12 December 1939 (age 86)
- Place of birth: Magyarlak, Hungary
- Position: Forward

Senior career*
Years	Team	Apps	(Gls)
1965–1972	Vasas SC	154	(18)

International career
1966–1967	Hungary	8	(1)
- * Club domestic league appearances and goals

Dezső Molnár (born 12 December 1939) is a Hungarian football forward who played for Hungary in the 1966 FIFA World Cup. He also played for Vasas SC.
