= Noel Cantwell =

Irish footballer (1932–2005)

Personal information
- Full name: Noel Euchuria Cornelius Cantwell
- Date of birth: 28 February 1932
- Place of birth: Cork, Ireland
- Date of death: 8 September 2005 (aged 73)
- Place of death: Peterborough, England
- Position: Full-back

Senior career*
| Years | Team | Apps | (Gls) |
| 1949–1950 | Western Rovers | | |
| 1950–1952 | Cork Athletic | ? | (1) |
| 1952–1960 | West Ham United | 248 | (11) |
| 1960–1967 | Manchester United | 123 | (6) |
| Total | | 371 | (18) |

International career
| 1953–1967 | Republic of Ireland | 36 | (14) |

Managerial career
- 1967–1972: Coventry City
- 1972–1977: Peterborough United
- 1977–1979: New England Tea Men
- 1980–1982: Jacksonville Tea Men
- 1986–1988: Peterborough United
- Cricket career
Cricket information
- Batting: Left-handed
- Bowling: Right-arm medium
Domestic team information
- Years: Team
- 1956: Ireland
Career statistics
| Competition | First-class |
|---|---|
| Matches | 1 |
| Runs scored | 48 |
| Batting average | 48.00 |
| 100s/50s | –/– |
| Top score | 31 |
| Balls bowled | 12 |
| Wickets | 0 |
| Bowling average | – |
| 5 wickets in innings | – |
| 10 wickets in match | – |
| Best bowling | – |
| Catches/stumpings | –/– |
- Source: Noel Cantwell at Cricinfo
- * Club domestic league appearances and goals

Noel Euchuria Cornelius Cantwell (28 February 1932 – 8 September 2005) was an Irish football player and sometime cricketer.

== Club career ==
Cantwell was born in Cork, Ireland, and was educated at the Roman Catholic Presentation Brothers College in Cork. Cantwell played as a full-back for Western Rovers, Cork Athletic, West Ham United, and Manchester United.

While at West Ham, he featured in the London XI side that competed in the 1955–58 Inter-Cities Fairs Cup final on 1 May 1958. He captained the Hammers to winning the Division Two championship in the 1957–58 season, thereby leading the club into the top flight for the first time since 1932.

In November 1960, Cantwell joined Manchester United for £29,500 which at the time was a record for a full back. He helped the club win the 1965 and 1967 league titles and captained United when winning the 1963 FA Cup Final – just as his fellow countryman Johnny Carey had done in United's previous FA Cup win 15 years earlier.

He also served as Chairman of the Professional Footballers' Association.

== International career ==
Cantwell won 36 full International caps for the Republic of Ireland (typically playing at left full back and on several occasions at centre forward) and he made his debut against Luxembourg in October 1953; his final appearance coming away to Turkey in February 1967. He scored 14 goals including 5 from penalties and also captained the Republic on several occasions including a match against England at Wembley.

== Managerial career ==
In his first managerial role at Coventry City Cantwell had the onerous task of following Jimmy Hill who had taken the club into the First Division for the first time in their history. Cantwell narrowly kept the Sky Blues in the top in his first two seasons before taking them to a sixth-place finish in 1969–70, earning them qualification for the Inter-Cities Fairs Cup (a year before it was replaced by the UEFA Cup).

He departed from Highfield Road on 12 March 1972, but within seven months was back in English football as manager of Peterborough United.

He helped Peterborough win the Fourth Division title in his first full season as manager, before leaving on 10 May 1977 to manage the New England Tea Men.

He returned to Peterborough on 19 November 1986 for a second spell as manager, remaining in this role until he became general manager on 12 July 1988. He was a general manager at London Road for a year until he quit football to become licensee of the New Inn at Peterborough, where he remained for 10 years until he retired in 1999. He also was landlord of the Bull and Swan in Stamford, Lincolnshire.

== Cricket career ==
Cantwell also played cricket for Cork Bohemians Cricket Club and Ireland as a left-handed batsman and a right-arm medium bowler. He played five times for Ireland making his debut in what was his sole first-class match versus Scotland at Edinburgh in 1956, scoring 31 and 17. His last match for Ireland was against Lancashire in July 1959.

== Death ==
Cantwell died on 8 September 2005 from cancer aged 73. He left a widow Maggie and two children.

His former teams each held a minute's silence for him before their next matches.

== Football career statistics ==
Scores and results list Republic of Ireland's goal tally first, score column indicates score after each Cantwell goal.

List of international goals scored by Noel Cantwell
| No. | Date | Venue | Opponent | Score | Result | Competition |
|---|---|---|---|---|---|---|
| 1 | 25 November 1956 | Dalymount Park, Dublin, Ireland | West Germany | 1–0 | 3–0 | Friendly |
| 2 | 15 October 1958 | Dalymount Park, Dublin, Ireland | Poland | 1–2 | 2–2 | Friendly |
| 3 | 15 October 1958 | Dalymount Park, Dublin, Ireland | Poland | 2–2 | 2–2 | Friendly |
| 4 | 5 April 1959 | Dalymount Park, Dublin, Ireland | Czechoslovakia | 2–0 | 2–0 | 1960 European Nations' Cup qualifying |
| 5 | 30 March 1960 | Dalymount Park, Dublin, Ireland | Chile | 1–0 | 2–0 | Friendly |
| 6 | 8 April 1962 | Dalymount Park, Dublin, Ireland | Austria | 1–1 | 2–3 | Friendly |
| 7 | 12 August 1962 | Dalymount Park, Dublin, Ireland | Iceland | 3–1 | 4–2 | 1964 European Nations' Cup qualifying |
| 8 | 12 August 1962 | Dalymount Park, Dublin, Ireland | Iceland | 4–1 | 4–2 | 1964 European Nations' Cup qualifying |
| 9 | 9 June 1963 | Dalymount Park, Dublin, Ireland | Scotland | 1–0 | 1–0 | Friendly |
| 10 | 13 October 1963 | Dalymount Park, Dublin, Ireland | Austria | 1–1 | 3–2 | 1964 European Nations' Cup qualifying |
| 11 | 13 October 1963 | Dalymount Park, Dublin, Ireland | Austria | 3–2 | 3–2 | 1964 European Nations' Cup qualifying |
| 12 | 25 May 1966 | Stade Maurice Dufrasne, Liège, Belgium | Belgium | 1–1 | 3–2 | Friendly |
| 13 | 25 May 1966 | Stade Maurice Dufrasne, Liège, Belgium | Belgium | 2–2 | 3–2 | Friendly |
| 14 | 22 February 1967 | 19 Mayıs Stadium, Ankara, Turkey | Turkey | 1–2 | 1–2 | UEFA Euro 1968 qualifying |

== Honours ==
Manchester United

- FA Cup: 1962–63
