= Dave Clements =

Northern Irish footballer (born 1945)

Personal information
- Date of birth: 15 September 1945 (age 81)
- Place of birth: Larne, Northern Ireland
- Positions: Defensive midfielder; left-back; outside left

Senior career*
Years	Team	Apps	(Gls)
1963–1964	Wolverhampton Wanderers	0	(0)
1964–1971	Coventry City	230	(26)
1971–1973	Sheffield Wednesday	78	(0)
1973–1976	Everton	83	(6)
1976–1977	New York Cosmos	18	(2)
1978	Colorado Caribous	15	(1)
Total		424	(35)

International career
1965–1976	Northern Ireland	48	(2)

Managerial career
- 1975–1976: Northern Ireland
- 1978: Colorado Caribous
- 1981–1982: Denver Avalanche
- 1982–1985: St. Louis Steamers
- 1987–1991: Kansas City Comets
- 1991–1994: University of Denver
- * Club domestic league appearances and goals

David Clements (born 15 September 1945) is a Northern Irish former football player and coach.

He started his career as an outside left but also played as a defensive midfielder and left-back. During a career which lasted from 1964 to 1976, playing for Coventry City, Sheffield Wednesday and Everton, he would make a total of 392 league appearances and score 32 goals. He played 48 times for the Northern Ireland national team between 1965 and 1976 scoring two goals. He then managed the national team for two years in 1975 and 1976 before moving to the NASL in the United States.

== Early days ==
Clements attended Larne Grammar School and excelled at both football and rugby union, during his time at the school he earned football caps for the national team at schoolboy, youth and amateur level. As a junior, he played for the Larne suburban team of Millbrook before signing for Irish league club Portadown F.C. in 1961. After starring in a 2–0 Irish amateur win over Wales in January 1963 he signed for English Division One club Wolverhampton Wanderers.

== Playing career ==
Clements' spell as an apprentice at Wolverhampton Wanderers lasted for just over a year, however in that time he failed to break into the first team.

=== Coventry City ===
Despite this lack of success at Wolves, Clements caught the eye of Coventry City manager Jimmy Hill who paid £1,500 for the 18-year-old at the start of the 1964–65 season. Clements made a fine start to his City career, scoring on his debut on 23 January 1965 against Northampton Town and netting eight times in his first ten matches. Two months later on 17 March 1965, aged just 19, he earned the first of his 48 caps for the Northern Ireland national team against the Netherlands. Clements was an integral part of the Coventry side which won the Second Division championship in the 1966–67 season and then did well in the top flight. He played as an outside left for much of his time at Coventry for whom he made 228 league appearances (255 including cup games) and scored 30 goals in total over a period of seven seasons. Throughout his time at Highfield Road he continued to be a regular for the Northern Ireland team, earning 21 caps in total while with the Midlands team. His most famous moment as an international player came in October 1967 when he scored the winning goal in a Euro 68 qualifier against Scotland at Windsor Park. Coventry manager Noel Cantwell surprisingly agreed to let Clements move on after six-years at the club and after rejecting a move to Hull City in February 1971, he moved to Sheffield Wednesday in August of the same year as part of a combined deal that also included Brian Joicey and cost the Yorkshire club £100,000.

=== Sheffield Wednesday ===
Clements played as a left-back for Wednesday and was a popular and successful player in his time there even though the club was not thriving in Division Two and would eventually drop into Division Three in 1975. His strong, robust style of play earned him the nickname "Tank" from Wednesday fans, he played 87 games for Wednesday in two seasons but became unsettled at the end of the 1972–73 season when his good form had attracted the attention of First Division clubs. He played just the opening game of the following season before moving to Everton at the beginning of September 1973 for a fee of £80,000.

=== Everton ===
Clements made his debut on Saturday, 22 September 1973 in a 1–1 draw at Wolverhampton Wanderers. He was made club captain for 1974–75, a season in which Everton were well placed to lift the First Division championship before a late slump let in Derby County. In total, Clements made 85 league appearances in his time with Everton scoring six goals (he took over as the clubs penalty taker) and became one of the most respected midfielders in the top flight. During his time at Everton he became player-manager of the Northern Ireland national side for a short time taking over from Terry Neill in 1975 and being replaced by Danny Blanchflower in 1976.

== Managerial career ==
Clements tenure as Northern Ireland national team manager lasted for eleven matches, he took over in the winter of 1974–75, part way through the qualification matches for Euro 76. He took over as manager at the age of only 29 and his first game as manager was on 16 March 1975 and was a Euro 76 qualifier against Yugoslavia in Belfast. This was the first time that Northern Ireland had played a home match in the province since 1971 and resulted in a fine 1–0 victory which put the Northern Irish in with a chance of qualification. However a home defeat to Sweden in October 1975 and a loss in Belgrade to Yugoslavia in the final group qualifier the following month stopped Northern Ireland progressing to the last eight knock out stage.

Clements continued as manager into 1976, however results were disappointing culminating in Northern Ireland losing all three matches in the British Home Championship in May of that year. They lost heavily to Scotland 3–0 in Glasgow and to England 4–0 at Wembley before losing 1–0 to Wales in Swansea. The Welsh defeat was Clements last game as both manager and player for the national team on 14 May 1976.

Clements played his last game for Everton in February 1976 and moved to the United States, having received a lucrative offer to play in the NASL for New York Cosmos where he played alongside Pelé. His performances for Cosmos during 1976 ensured that Clements was named in the All-Star Honourable Mention Team for that year, he was also selected for Team America to participate in the Bicentenary Cup against Italy, Brazil and England.

Clements moved to coach the Colorado Caribous of the North American Soccer League in 1978, the only year of their existence, and then coached three teams in the Major Indoor Soccer League, the Denver Avalanche (1981–82), St. Louis Steamers (1982–85) and Kansas City Comets (1986–87). He was named US Coach of the year in 1982 and 1987.

Clements still lives in the Denver area, he moved out of football and has run his own Irish shop, worked as a salesman in St. Louis, Missouri, and was CEO of a Denver company that manufactured Cotton Candy machines.

He was also the coach of the University of Denver men's soccer team.
