= Jan Karlsson (footballer) =

Swedish footballer (1940–2019)

Personal information
- Full name: Jan Karlsson
- Date of birth: 4 December 1940
- Date of death: 16 April 2019 (aged 78)
- Position: Defender

Senior career*
| Years | Team | Apps | (Gls) |
| –1960 | Jönköpings Södra IF | | |
| 1961–1965 | Djurgårdens IF | | |
| 1966–1967 | IFÖ Bromölla IF | | |
| 1968–1969 | Jönköpings Södra IF | 42 | (3) |

International career
| 1962–1969 | Sweden | 28 | (1) |
- * Club domestic league appearances and goals

Jan Karlsson (4 December 1940 – 16 April 2019)) was a Swedish former footballer. He played for Jönköpings Södra IF, Djurgårdens IF and IFÖ Bromölla IF. Karlsson made 28 appearances for Sweden men's national football team and scored 1 goal.

== Honours ==
=== Club ===
Djurgårdens IF

- Allsvenskan: 1964
