= Ernő Solymosi =

Hungarian footballer (1940–2011)

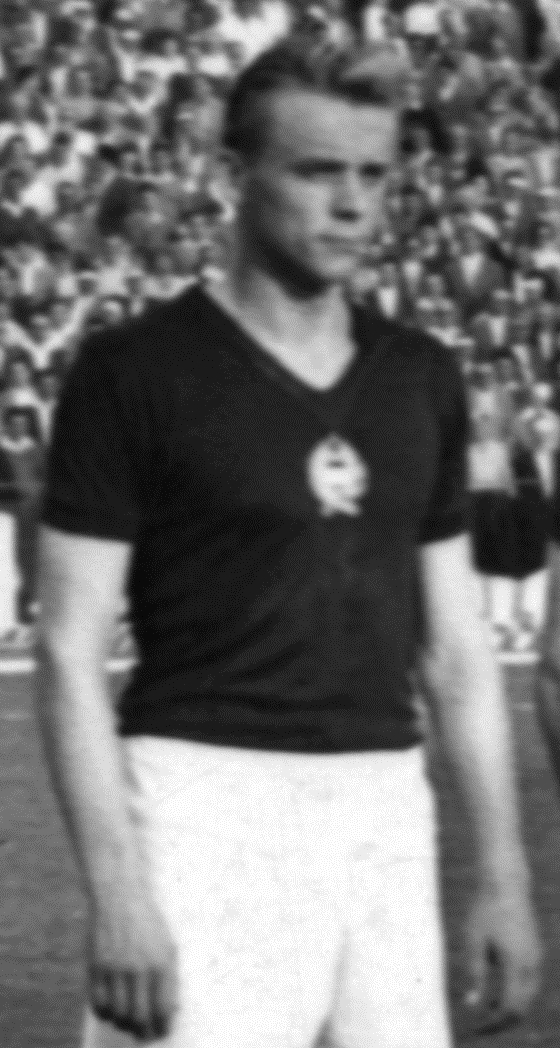

Personal information
- Full name: Ernő Solymosi
- Date of birth: 21 June 1940
- Place of birth: Diósgyőr, Kingdom of Hungary
- Date of death: 19 February 2011 (aged 70)
- Height: 1.86 m (6 ft 1 in)
- Positions: Midfielder; defender

Senior career*
Years	Team	Apps	(Gls)
1958–1961	Diósgyőri VTK		
1961–1971	Újpesti Dózsa	232	(64)
1971–1972	Pécsi Dózsa	28	(1)

International career
1960–1968	Hungary	38	(7)
Medal record
Representing Hungary
Men's football
Bronze medal – third place	1960 Rome	Team competition
- * Club domestic league appearances and goals

Ernő Solymosi (21 June 1940 – 19 February 2011) was a Hungarian footballer. He was born in Diósgyőr. He played for the clubs Diósgyőri VTK, Újpest FC and Pécsi Dózsa as a midfielder and defender. He played 38 games and scored 7 goals for the Hungary national football team. He is most famous for his participation in the bronze medal-winning Hungarian team on the 1960 Summer Olympic Games and the European Championship of 1964, and for playing on the 1962 FIFA World Cup.

After his career as footballer, he worked for the Ministry for Home Affairs, being the personal guard of János Kádár, the communist leader of Hungary from 1956 to 1988. He has retired in 1993.
