= UEFA Euro 1968 quarter-finals =

The UEFA Euro 1968 quarter-finals was the last round of qualifying competition for UEFA Euro 1968. It was contested by the eight group winners of the qualifying tournament. The winners of each of four home-and-away ties qualified for the final tournament in Italy. The matches were played in April and May 1968.

== Qualification ==
Each group winner progressed to the quarter-finals. The quarter-finals were played in two legs on a home-and-away basis. If the aggregate scores were level at the end of the tie, a third leg had to be played at a neutral venue. The winners of the quarter-finals would go through to the final tournament.

== Draw ==
The quarter-final draw was conducted in Paris on 16 January 1968. At that time only 7 out of eight group winners were known, as the crucial match of Group 8 involving Scotland and England was scheduled on February 24. There were no seeds. The teams were drawn in the following order:

- England/Scotland - Spain
- France - Yugoslavia
- Hungary - USSR
- Bulgaria - Italy

The semifinals would be:

- Winner QF1 - Winner QF2
- Winner QF3 - Winner QF4.

In the same meeting, it was decided that Italy was the first choice to host the final tournament in June 1968, second choice was the winner between England and Scotland, third choice was Spain. The final tournament had to be hosted in one of the qualified Countries.

== Summary ==
Team 1	Agg.	Team 2	1st leg	2nd leg
Bulgaria	3–4	Italy	3–2	0–2
Hungary	2–3	Soviet Union	2–0	0–3
England	3–1	Spain	1–0	2–1
France	2–6	Yugoslavia	1–1	1–5

== Matches ==
The eight matches took place over two legs, taking place in April and May 1968.

6 April 1968
17:00

Bulgaria	3–2	Italy
Kotkov 11' (pen.); Dermendzhiev 66'; Zhekov 73'	Report	Penev 60' (o.g.); Prati 83'

Vasil Levski, Sofia
Attendance: 57,689
Referee: Gerhard Schulenburg (West Germany)
20 April 1968
16:00

Italy	2–0	Bulgaria
Prati 14'; Domenghini 55'	Report

Stadio San Paolo, Naples
Attendance: 83,830
Referee: Gottfried Dienst (Switzerland)

Italy won 4–3 on aggregate and qualified for UEFA Euro 1968.

4 May 1968
17:00

Hungary	2–0	Soviet Union
Farkas 21'; Göröcs 85'	Report

Népstadion, Budapest
Attendance: 71,556
Referee: Laurens Van Ravens (Netherlands)
11 May 1968
19:30

Soviet Union	3–0	Hungary
Solymosi 22' (o.g.); Khurtsilava 59'; Byshovets 73'	Report

Central Lenin Stadium, Moscow
Attendance: 91,129
Referee: Kurt Tschenscher (West Germany)

Soviet Union won 3–2 on aggregate and qualified for UEFA Euro 1968.

3 April 1968
19:45

England	1–0	Spain
B. Charlton 84'	Report

Wembley Stadium, London
Attendance: 94,586
Referee: Gilbert Droz (Switzerland)
8 May 1968
20:30

Spain	1–2	England
Amancio 47'	Report	Peters 54'; Hunter 81'

Santiago Bernabéu, Madrid
Attendance: 66,994
Referee: Josef Krnavek (Czechoslovakia)

England won 3–1 on aggregate and qualified for UEFA Euro 1968.

6 April 1968
16:00

France	1–1	Yugoslavia
Di Nallo 78'	Report	Musemić 66'

Stade Vélodrome, Marseille
Attendance: 35,423
Referee: Erwin Vetter (East Germany)
24 April 1968
16:30

Yugoslavia	5–1	France
Petković 3', 32'; Musemić 13', 79'; Džajić 14'	Report	Di Nallo 33'

Stadion JNA, Belgrade
Attendance: 47,747
Referee: Paul Schiller (Austria)

Yugoslavia won 6–2 on aggregate and qualified for UEFA Euro 1968.

== Goalscorers ==
There were 24 goals scored in 8 matches, for an average of 3 goals per match.

3 goals

- (Yugoslavia national football team) Vahidin Musemić

2 goals

- (France national football team) Fleury Di Nallo
- (Italy national football team) Pierino Prati
- (Yugoslavia national football team) Ilija Petković

1 goal

- (Bulgaria national football team) Dinko Dermendzhiev
- (Bulgaria national football team) Nikola Kotkov
- (Bulgaria national football team) Petar Zhekov
- (England national football team) Bobby Charlton
- (England national football team) Norman Hunter
- (England national football team) Martin Peters
- (Hungary national football team) János Farkas
- (Hungary national football team) János Göröcs
- (Italy national football team) Angelo Domenghini
- (Soviet Union national football team) Anatoliy Byshovets
- (Soviet Union national football team) Murtaz Khurtsilava
- (Spain national football team) Amancio Amaro
- (Yugoslavia national football team) Dragan Džajić

1 own goal

- (Bulgaria national football team) Dimitar Penev (against Italy)
- (Hungary national football team) Ernő Solymosi (against Soviet Union)
