= Nikola Kotkov =

Bulgarian footballer

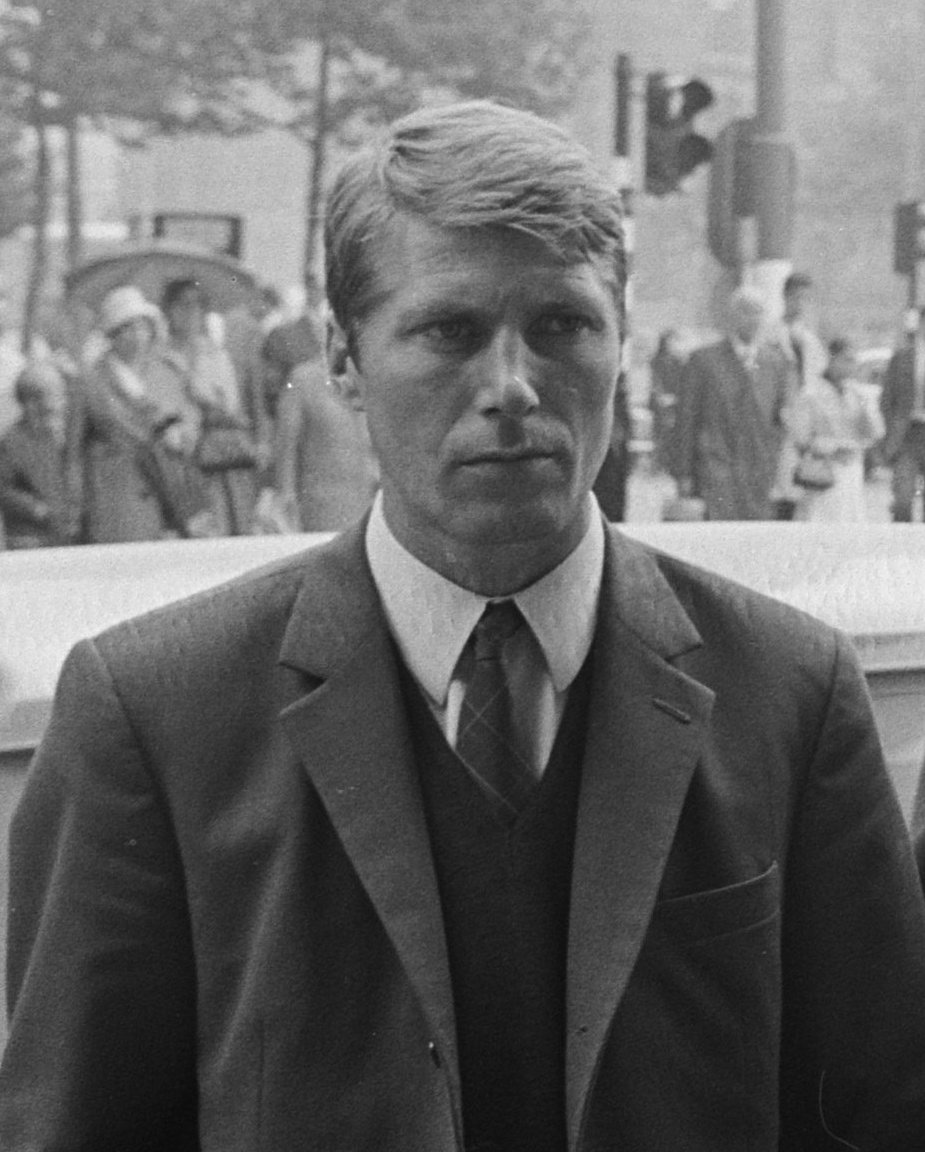
- Nikola Kotkov, 1969

Personal information
- Full name: Nikola Todorov Kotkov
- Date of birth: 9 December 1938
- Place of birth: Sofia, Bulgaria
- Date of death: 30 June 1971 (aged 32)
- Place of death: Vitinya Pass, Bulgaria
- Position: Striker

Youth career
- Lokomotiv Sofia

Senior career*
Years	Team	Apps	(Gls)
1956–1968	Lokomotiv Sofia	276	(142)
1969	ZHSK Slavia	10	(3)
1969–1971	Levski Sofia	36	(18)
Total		322	(163)

International career
1956–1959	Bulgaria U19	16	(8)
1959–1961	Bulgaria U21	7	(5)
1961–1969	Bulgaria	26	(12)
- * Club domestic league appearances and goals

Nikola Todorov Kotkov (Bulgarian: Никола Тодоров Котков) (9 December 1938 – 30 June 1971), nicknamed Koteto (Котето, "The Kitten") was a Bulgarian footballer who played as a striker.

Born in the capital Sofia, Kotkov started his football career as a Lokomotiv Sofia trainee and went on to spend much of it (1956–1969) with the club, winning the Bulgarian Championship in 1964. He then played for Levski Sofia, until his death in 1971. Kotkov died together with his friend and teammate Georgi Asparuhov in a traffic accident in the Vitinya Pass of the Balkan Mountains, en route to Vratsa. With Levski, Kotkov became once again champion in 1970, winning the Bulgarian Cup the same year.

Kotkov played a total of 322 matches and scored 163 goals in the Bulgarian Championship and was given the Bulgarian Footballer of the Year award in 1964. For the Bulgaria national team, he had 26 caps and scored 12 goals, taking part in the 1966 FIFA World Cup in England.

Kotkov was known for his technique, pinpoint passing and skillful free kick taking.

== Statistics ==
- National teams — 59 matches, 33 goals
- Bulgarian championship — 322 matches, 163 goals — 286/145 for Lokomotiv, 45/25 for Levski
- European club tournaments — 11 matches, 10 goals — CEC-6, CWC-5
- First match — with Lokomotiv Sofia 1956
- Last match — with Levski against CSKA — 28 June 1971
- All - 392 matches, 206 goals

== Honours ==
- Champion of Bulgaria — 2 times, 1964 with Lokomotiv and 1970 with Levski
- Holder of the National Cup — 2 times 1970, 1971 (posthumously) with Levski
- Bulgarian Footballer of the Year — 1964
- UEFA Euro Under-19 Champion with Bulgaria — 1959
- Holder of an Order of Labour — 1970
- Deserved Master of Sports
- Ballon d'Or 25th place — 1967

== Death ==
On June 30 1971, Kotkov died in a car crash with teammate Georgi Asparuhov.
