= Ronnie Rees =

Welsh footballer (1944–2023)

Personal information
- Full name: Ronald Raymond Rees
- Date of birth: 4 April 1944
- Place of birth: Ystradgynlais, Wales
- Date of death: 29 October 2023 (aged 79)
- Place of death: Swansea, Wales
- Position: Winger

Senior career*
Years	Team	Apps	(Gls)
1962–1968	Coventry City	230	(42)
1968–1969	West Bromwich Albion	40	(6)
1969–1972	Nottingham Forest	76	(9)
1972–1975	Swansea City	89	(5)
1975	Haverfordwest		

International career
1965–1972	Wales	39	(3)
- * Club domestic league appearances and goals

Ronald Raymond Rees (4 April 1944 – 29 October 2023) was a Welsh professional footballer who played predominantly as a winger and was able to play down either flank. He spent six years with Coventry City. At international level, he made 39 appearances for the Wales national team scoring three goals.

== Career ==
Rees was a graduate of the Coventry City youth team, and was given his debut for the senior team by Jimmy Hill in May 1962. Rees spent six years at Highfield Road, helping Coventry gain promotion from Division Three to Division One.

Rees left Coventry to join West Bromwich Albion for a fee of £65,000 in March 1968. He spent less than a year at the club, joining Nottingham Forest in February 1969 for £60,000.

Swansea City manager Roy Bentley paid Forest a club-record £26,000 for Rees in January 1972. Rees spent three and a half seasons with Swansea before joining Haverfordwest of the League of Wales in August 1975.

== Later life and death ==
Following his retirement from professional football, Rees worked at the Ford motorworks in Swansea and Bridgend. He was forced to retire in 1995, at the age of 51, after suffering a major stroke that took his ability to walk and talk. He was a resident at Hengoed Court Care Home, Swansea. Although in poor health he liked to keep up to date with all Coventry City football news.

Rees died on 29 October 2023, at the age of 79.

== Honours ==
- Coventry City Hall of Fame
