= Kjetil Hasund =

Norwegian footballer (born 1942)

Personal information
- Full name: Kjetil Hasund
- Date of birth: 5 May 1942 (age 84)
- Place of birth: Ulsteinvik, Norway
- Position: Forward

Senior career*
Years	Team	Apps	(Gls)
1959–1980	Hødd		

International career
1966–1971	Norway	16	(3)
- * Club domestic league appearances and goals

Kjetil Hasund (born 5 May 1942) is a former Norwegian football player who played for Hødd and the Norwegian national team.

He played for Hødd his whole career, and was the biggest star of the team from 1963 to the beginning of the 1970s. He played a total of 646 matches for the club (in all competitions, including friendlies), and scored 460 goals until he retired in 1980. In 2012, he was voted Hødd's best player of all times.

Hasund was capped 16 times for Norway between 1966 and 1971 and scored three goals.

Hasund comes from a family of footballers, and his son Geir Hasund and his brother Hallbjørn Hasund have also played for Hødd.
