= Ron Davies (footballer, born 1942) =

Welsh footballer

Personal information
- Full name: Ronald Tudor Davies
- Date of birth: 25 May 1942
- Place of birth: Holywell, Flintshire, Wales
- Date of death: 24 May 2013 (aged 70)
- Place of death: Albuquerque, New Mexico, United States
- Height: 6 ft 0 in (1.83 m)
- Position: Forward

Senior career*
Years	Team	Apps	(Gls)
1959–1962	Chester	94	(45)
1962–1963	Luton Town	32	(21)
1963–1965	Norwich City	113	(58)
1966–1973	Southampton	240	(134)
1973–1974	Portsmouth	59	(18)
1974–1975	Manchester United	8	(0)
1975	→ Millwall (loan)	3	(0)
1976–1977	Dorchester Town	17	(7)
1976–1978	Los Angeles Aztecs	69	(15)
1978	Tulsa Roughnecks	4	(0)
1979	Seattle Sounders	22	(1)
Total		661	(299)

International career
1964–1974	Wales	29	(9)
- * Club domestic league appearances and goals

Ronald Tudor Davies (25 May 1942 – 24 May 2013) was a Welsh footballer, who played as a centre forward. He spent most of his career with Southampton in the Football League First Division, and also for the Welsh national team.

Born in Holywell, Flintshire, Wales, he went to the same school as the Spurs defender Mike England, whom he played alongside in internationals for Wales. He was known as a header of the ball and was the top goal scorer in Division 1 for two seasons (1966–1968). In his first season at Southampton, he scored 12 goals across 10 consecutive league games.

His younger brother Paul was an Arsenal youth player, who went on to play for Charlton Athletic.

== Early career ==
After an unsuccessful trial with Blackburn Rovers, Davies signed his first professional contract in July 1959 with Chester. There he was made to hurdle wearing army boots – training, he later claimed, which gave him his strength when jumping for crosses.

He made his debut in a 5–0 defeat to Workington in March 1960, and the following two seasons would see the club finish bottom of the Football League. However, Davies had a strong strike rate and was a regular in the team. Following a rare spell out of favour that saw him placed on the transfer list, his reply was to score four goals in a 6–1 win against Southport in October 1962. Port Vale manager Norman Low offered £7,000 plus Terry Miles for Davies, but the deal fell through after the Vale directors vetoed the move. He went instead to Luton Town for a fee of £12,200 and, when they were relegated, he moved on again to Norwich City.

== Norwich City ==
His transfer to Norwich in September 1963 involved a fee of £35,000. He averaged more than a goal every other game for Norwich, starting with a goal in each of his first four matches. He went on to score 30 goals that season in a side who finished 17th in the English Football League, Division Two. In the next two seasons he scored 15 and 21 before being sold to Southampton for £55,000.

He made his international debut at the age of 21 for Wales on 15 April 1964 in a 3–2 defeat against Northern Ireland.

== Southampton ==
Ted Bates had spent a then club record £55,000 for Davies as the club prepared to face their inaugural season in the top division. Already an established Welsh international, Davies scored 12 goals in 10 consecutive League games, and ended that season having scored 37 goals in 41 games, more than any other player in the division. The club retained their place in the division. The first of his 134 League goals for Southampton was on 27 August 1966 at Bloomfield Road, as his club beat hosts Blackpool 3–2. In front of a crowd of 15,258, he lobbed Tony Waiters. "The 'keeper came off his line – way out of the box. I was 35 yards out and I couldn't believe it. I just knocked it over his head."

He was joint top goalscorer in the division in the following season, 1967–68, along with George Best. On 16 August 1969, he scored four goals, all headers, in a match against Manchester United at Old Trafford, after which Matt Busby said that Davies had no peer in Europe.

By the 1970s, many clubs had learned how to cope with Davies' aerial power, and he was often neutralised by defenders playing the man rather than the ball. A series of injuries reduced his effectiveness, and his scoring was reduced. By 1973, he was unable to retain a regular place in the first team.

== Later career ==
He left Southampton for Portsmouth in April 1973, and scored 18 goals for them in 59 games. Manchester United then signed him in November 1974 but his playing opportunities were limited. He left for Millwall a year later after making eight appearances for United, all of them from the substitute's bench. He appeared three times for Millwall.

His final international appearance was on 11 May 1974 in a 2–0 defeat against England, bringing his total number of caps to 29, with 9 goals scored.

Davies returned to Southampton to live, but then moved to Los Angeles to play for the Los Angeles Aztecs alongside George Best. When the 1976 North American Soccer League season ended, Davies returned to the UK for the winter and had a five-month spell (October 1976 to February 1977) playing in the Southern League for Dorchester Town. He then had two further seasons with the Aztecs with a modest scoring record before moving on to the Tulsa Roughnecks in 1978 and the Seattle Sounders in 1979. He also coached at local schools in LA and Florida.

Davies subsequently moved to Albuquerque, New Mexico, where he lived in a motor-home and worked in the construction industry. He lost touch with many of his former playing colleagues. Contact was re-established in 2006 when there were discussions of an appeal for support to enable him to have a hip replacement. He said that his hip had been damaged due to the wear and tear of his playing days and that he could not afford the necessary surgery and would soon have to stop working. The appeal organised on his behalf by fans of Southampton was successful, enabling him to have two hip replacements and providing a surplus for his general use. However, following the death of his American partner, Chris, in 2009 he once again became reclusive.

Davies' caricatures of his teammates often featured in the local press.

== Death ==
Davies died in Albuquerque on 24 May 2013.

== Career statistics ==
=== Club ===
Appearances and goals by club, season and competition
Club	Season	League			Cup		Europe		Total	
Club	Season	Division	Apps	Goals	Apps	Goals	Apps	Goals	Apps	Goals
Chester City	1959–60	Fourth Division	8	1			—		8	1
Chester City	1960–61	Fourth Division	39	23			—		39	23
Chester City	1961–62	Fourth Division	38	14			—		38	14
Chester City	1962–63	Fourth Division	9	7			—		9	7
Chester City	Total		94	45			—		94	45
Luton Town	1962–63	Second Division	29	21			—		29	21
Luton Town	1963–64	Third Division	3	0			—		3	0
Luton Town	Total		32	21			—		32	21
Norwich City	1963–64	Second Division	38	26			—		38	26
Norwich City	1964–65	Second Division	35	14			—		35	14
Norwich City	1965–66	Second Division	40	18			—		40	18
Norwich City	Total		113	58			—		113	58
Southampton	1966–67	First Division	41	37			—		41	37
Southampton	1967–68	First Division	40	28			—		40	28
Southampton	1968–69	First Division	38	20			—		38	20
Southampton	1969–70	First Division	29	12			6 (Note: Appearances in Inter-Cities Fairs Cup)	4	35	16
Southampton	1970–71	First Division	40	17			—		40	17
Southampton	1971–72	First Division	27	11			2 (Note: Appearances in UEFA Cup)	0	29	11
Southampton	1972–73	First Division	25	9			—		25	9
Southampton	Total		240	134			8	4	248	138
Portsmouth	1973–74	Second Division	42	13			—		42	13
Portsmouth	1974–75	Second Division	17	5			—		17	5
Portsmouth	Total		59	18			—		59	18
Manchester United	1974–75	Second Division	8	0			—		8	0
Millwall (loan)	1975–76	Third Division	3	0			—		3	0
Los Angeles Aztecs	1976	NASL	24	6			—		24	6
Los Angeles Aztecs	1977	NASL	25	6			—		25	6
Los Angeles Aztecs	1978	NASL	20	3			—		20	3
Los Angeles Aztecs	Total		69	15			—		69	15
Dorchester Town	1976–77	Southern Football League	17	7			—		17	7
Tulsa Roughnecks	1978	NASL	4	0			—		4	0
Seattle Sounders	1979	NASL	22	1			—		22	1
Career total			661	299			8	4	669	303
