= János Farkas =

Hungarian footballer (1942–1989)

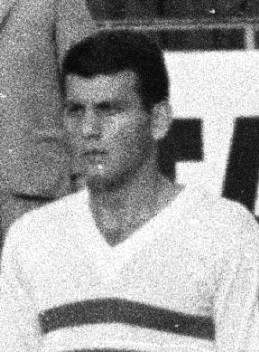

Personal information
- Date of birth: 27 March 1942
- Place of birth: Budapest, Hungary
- Date of death: 29 September 1989 (aged 47)
- Place of death: Budapest, Hungary
- Position: Striker

Senior career*
Years	Team	Apps	(Gls)
1959–1972	Vasas SC	250	(151)
1963	→ Ferencvárosi TC (loan)		

International career
1961–1969	Hungary	33	(20)
Medal record
Men's football
Representing Hungary
Olympic Games
Gold medal – first place	1964 Tokyo	Team competition
- * Club domestic league appearances and goals

János Farkas (27 March 1942 – 29 September 1989) was a Hungarian footballer who played as a forward.

== Career ==
During his club career he played for Vasas SC. At international level, he earned 33 caps and scored 20 goals for the Hungary national football team between 1961 and 1969, and participated in the 1962 FIFA World Cup, the 1964 European Nations' Cup, and the 1966 FIFA World Cup. He also won a gold medal in football at the 1964 Summer Olympics. He is particularly remembered for his fabulous goal at the 1966 FIFA World Cup against Brazil, contributing to a sensational 3–1 win against the incumbent champions.

He ended his career in Vasas with a 3-1 defeat from Egri Dózsa SE on 31 May 1972.

== Career statistics ==
Club performance			League		Cup		League Cup		Continental		Total	
Season	Club	League	Apps	Goals	Apps	Goals	Apps	Goals	Apps	Goals	Apps	Goals
Hungary			League		Hungarian Cup		League Cup		Europe		Total	
1959–60	Vasas Budapest	National Championship I	0	0								
1960–61	Vasas Budapest	National Championship I	0	0								
1961–62	Vasas Budapest	National Championship I	22	8								
1962–63	Vasas Budapest	National Championship I	15	5								
1963	Vasas Budapest	National Championship I	11	1								
1964	Vasas Budapest	National Championship I	22	12								
1965	Vasas Budapest	National Championship I	25	18								
1966	Vasas Budapest	National Championship I	26	25								
1967	Vasas Budapest	National Championship I	27	19								
1968	Vasas Budapest	National Championship I	27	19								
1969	Vasas Budapest	National Championship I	27	21								
1970	Vasas Budapest	National Championship I	0	0								
1970–71	Vasas Budapest	National Championship I	33	17								
1971–72	Vasas Budapest	National Championship I	15	6								
Total	Hungary		250	151								
Career total			250	151								

== International record ==
Appearances and goals by year
National team	Year	Apps	Goals
Hungary	1961	2	0
Hungary	1962	3	0
Hungary	1964	1	0
Hungary	1965	4	2
Hungary	1966	11	10
Hungary	1967	6	5
Hungary	1968	2	1
Hungary	1969	4	1
Total		33	19
