= 1968–69 European Cup Winners' Cup =

Final positions
- Champions: (Czechoslovakia) Slovan Bratislava (1st title)
- Runners-up: (Spain) Barcelona

Tournament statistics
- Matches played: 51
- Goals scored: 156 (3.06 per match)
- Top scorer: Carl-Heinz Rühl (1. FC Köln) 6 goals

The 1968–69 European Cup Winners' Cup was the ninth season of the European Cup Winners' Cup, a club football competition organised by UEFA for the cup winners from each of its member associations. The tournament was won by Czechoslovak side Slovan Bratislava, who beat Spanish club Barcelona 3–2 in the final in Basel, Switzerland. It was the first time a club from the Eastern Bloc won the title. A number of withdrawals by Eastern European clubs from the first round as a result of the Warsaw Pact invasion of Czechoslovakia led to several walkovers and byes that lasted into the second round.

== Teams ==
(Albania) KS Partizani (CW)	(Austria) GAK (CR)	(Belgium) Club Brugge KV (CW)	(Bulgaria) FC Spartak Sofia (CW)
(Cyprus) APOEL (CW)	(Czechoslovakia) Slovan Bratislava (CW)	(Denmark) Randers (CW)	(England) West Bromwich Albion (CW)
(France) Girondins Bordeaux (CR)	(East Germany) Union Berlin (CW)	(West Germany) 1. FC Köln (CW)	(Greece) Olympiacos (CW)
(Hungary) Raba Vasas ETO (CW)	(Iceland) KR Reykjavík (CW)	(Republic of Ireland) Shamrock Rovers (CW)	(Italy) Torino (CW)
(Luxembourg) US Rumelange (CW)	(Malta) Sliema Wanderers (CW)	(Netherlands) ADO Den Haag (CW)	(Northern Ireland) Crusaders (CW)
(Norway) Lyn (CW)	(Poland) Górnik Zabrze (CW)	(Portugal) Porto (CW)	(Romania) Dinamo București (CW)
(Scotland) Dunfermline Athletic (CW)	(Spain) Barcelona (CW)	(Sweden) IFK Norrköping (CR)	(Switzerland) Lugano (CW)
(Turkey) Altay SK (CR)	(Soviet Union) Dinamo Moscow (CW)	(Wales) Cardiff City (CW)	(Socialist Federal Republic of Yugoslavia) FK Bor (CR)

KTP had qualified from Finland after winning the 1967 Finnish Cup, but withdrew without playing a single match.

== Bracket ==
First round
(Netherlands) ADO Den Haag	4	2	6
(Austria) GAK	1	0	1
(France) Girondins Bordeaux	2	0	2
(West Germany) 1. FC Köln	1	3	4
(Denmark) Randers	1	2	3
(Republic of Ireland) Shamrock Rovers	0	1	1
(Luxembourg) US Rumelange	2	0	2
(Malta) Sliema Wanderers (a)	1	1	2
(Switzerland) Lugano	0	0	0
(Spain) Barcelona	1	3	4
(Turkey) Altay SK	3	1	4
(Norway) Lyn	1	4	5
(Northern Ireland) Crusaders	2	1	3
(Sweden) IFK Norrköping	2	4	6
(Scotland) Dunfermline Athletic	10	2	12
(Cyprus) APOEL	1	0	1
(Greece) Olympiacos	2	2	4
(Iceland) KR Reykjavík	0	0	0
(Romania) Dinamo București	-	-	w
(Hungary) Raba Vasas ETO	-	-	o
(Belgium) Club Brugge KV	3	0	3
(England) West Bromwich Albion (a)	1	2	3
(Albania) KS Partizani	1	1	2
(Italy) Torino	0	3	3
(Wales) Cardiff City	2	1	3
(Portugal) Porto	2	2	4
(Czechoslovakia) Slovan Bratislava	3	0	3
(Socialist Federal Republic of Yugoslavia) FK Bor	0	2	2

Second round
(Netherlands) ADO Den Haag	0	0	0
(West Germany) 1. FC Köln	1	3	4
(Denmark) Randers	6	2	8
(Malta) Sliema Wanderers	0	0	0
(Spain) Barcelona	-	-	-
Bye	-	-	-
(Norway) Lyn	2	2	4
(Sweden) IFK Norrköping	0	3	3
(Scotland) Dunfermline Athletic	4	0	4
(Greece) Olympiacos	0	3	3
(Romania) Dinamo București	1	0	1
(England) West Bromwich Albion	1	4	5
(Italy) Torino	-	-	-
Bye	-	-	-
(Portugal) Porto	1	0	1
(Czechoslovakia) Slovan Bratislava	0	4	4

Quarter-finals
(West Germany) 1. FC Köln	2	3	5
(Denmark) Randers	1	0	1
(Spain) Barcelona	3	2	5
(Norway) Lyn	2	2	4
(Scotland) Dunfermline Athletic	0	1	1
(England) West Bromwich Albion	0	0	0
(Italy) Torino	0	1	1
(Czechoslovakia) Slovan Bratislava	1	2	3

Semi-finals
(West Germany) 1. FC Köln	2	1	3
(Spain) Barcelona	2	4	6
(Scotland) Dunfermline Athletic	1	0	1
(Czechoslovakia) Slovan Bratislava	1	1	2

Final
(Spain) Barcelona	2
(Czechoslovakia) Slovan Bratislava	3

== First round ==
Team 1	Agg.	Team 2	1st leg	2nd leg
Dunfermline Athletic (Scotland)	12–1	(Cyprus) APOEL	10–1	2–0
Olympiacos (Greece)	4–0	(Iceland) KR Reykjavík	2–0	2–0^{1}
Dinamo București (Romania)	w/o	(Hungary) Raba Vasas ETO	n/a	n/a
Club Brugge KV (Belgium)	3–3 (a)	(England) West Bromwich Albion	3–1	0–2
KS Partizani (Albania)	2–3	(Italy) Torino	1–0	1–3
Cardiff City (Wales)	3–4	(Portugal) Porto	2–2	1–2
Slovan Bratislava (Czechoslovakia)	3–2	(Socialist Federal Republic of Yugoslavia) FK Bor	3–0	0–2
ADO Den Haag (Netherlands)	6–1	(Austria) GAK	4–1	2–0
Girondins Bordeaux (France)	2–4	(West Germany) 1. FC Köln	2–1	0–3
Randers (Denmark)	3–1	(Republic of Ireland) Shamrock Rovers	1–0	2–1
US Rumelange (Luxembourg)	2–2 (a)	(Malta) Sliema Wanderers	2–1^{2}	0–1
Lugano (Switzerland)	0–4	(Spain) Barcelona	0–1	0–3
Altay (Turkey)	4–5	(Norway) Lyn	3–1	1–4
Crusaders (Northern Ireland)	3–6	(Sweden) IFK Norrköping	2–2	1–4

The following clubs withdrew following UEFA's decision to separate Western and Eastern countries due to troubles in Czechoslovakia:
FC Spartak (Sofia), Union Berlin, Górnik Zabrze, Dinamo Moscow, Raba Vasas ETO

^{1} The match was played in Thessaloniki.

^{2} The match was played in Esch.

=== First leg ===
18 September 1968

Dunfermline Athletic (Scotland)	10–1	(Cyprus) APOEL
Robertson 9', 46'; Barry 17'; Gardner 19'; Renton 26', 86'; Edwards 44'; W. Callaghan 57', 65'; T. Callaghan 70'		Stylianou 74'

East End Park, Dunfermline
Attendance: 7,167
Referee: Kåre Sirevaag (Norway)

20 September 1968

Olympiacos (Greece)	2–0	(Iceland) KR Reykjavík
Botinos 45'; Zanteroglou 90'

Karaiskakis Stadium, Piraeus,
Attendance: 22,000
Referee: Kostadin Dinov (Bulgaria)

18 September 1968

Club Brugge KV (Belgium)	3–1	(England) West Bromwich Albion
Thio 26'; Lambert 51'; Bailliu 73'		Hartford 34'

Klokke Stadion, Bruges
Referee: Frede Hansen (Denmark)

18 September 1968

KS Partizani (Albania)	1–0	(Italy) Torino
Shaqiri 46'

Qemal Stafa Stadium, Tirana
Referee: Milivoje Gugulović (Yugoslavia)

18 September 1968

Cardiff City (Wales)	2–2	(Portugal) Porto
Toshack 24'; Bird 50' (pen.)		Custódio Pinto 60', 68'

Ninian Park, Cardiff
Attendance: 19,202
Referee: Gaspar Pintado Viú (Spain)

18 September 1968

Slovan Bratislava (Czechoslovakia)	3–0	(Socialist Federal Republic of Yugoslavia) Bor
Jokl 48', 69'; Cvetler 80'	Report

Tehelné pole, Bratislava
Attendance: 10,000
Referee: Ferdinand Marschall (Austria)

19 September 1968

ADO Den Haag (Netherlands)	4–1	(Austria) GAK
Giesen 41', 69'; Schoenmaker 53'; Aarts 57'		Hohenwarter 40'

Zuiderpark Stadium, The Hague
Referee: Antoine Queudeville (Luxembourg)

18 September 1968

Girondins Bordeaux (France)	2–1	(West Germany) 1. FC Köln
Petyt 19'; Massé 56'		Rühl 26'

Stade Lescure, Bordeaux
Referee: Jef Dorpmans (Netherlands)

18 September 1968

Randers (Denmark)	1–0	(Republic of Ireland) Shamrock Rovers
Gaardsøe 88'

Randers Stadium, Randers
Attendance:
Referee: Hans-Joachim Weyland (West Germany)

18 September 1968

US Rumelange (Luxembourg)	2–1	(Malta) Sliema Wanderers
Leszczynski 21', 48'	Report	Cocks 58'

Stade de la Frontière, Esch-sur-Alzette
Attendance: 2,199
Referee: Alfred Ott (West Germany)

18 September 1968

Lugano (Switzerland)	0–1	(Spain) Barcelona
		Zabalza 76'

Cornaredo Stadium, Lugano
Attendance:
Referee: Roger Machin (France)

18 September 1968

Altay (Turkey)	3–1	(Norway) Lyn
Öztürk 17'; Erhanoğlu 83', 89'		Austnes 62'

Alsancak Stadium, İzmir
Attendance:
Referee: Iosif Ritter (Romania)

18 September 1968

Crusaders (Northern Ireland)	2–2	(Sweden) IFK Norrköping
Jamison 40'; Parke 77'		Hult 42'; Hultberg 53'

Seaview, Belfast
Attendance:
Referee: Vital Loraux (Belgium)

=== Second leg ===
2 October 1968

APOEL (Cyprus)	0–2	(Scotland) Dunfermline Athletic
		Gardner 57'; W. Callaghan 84'

Makario Stadium, Nicosia
Attendance: 3,200
Referee: Francesco Francescon (Italy)

Dunfermline Athletic won 12-1 on aggregate.

22 September 1968

KR Reykjavík (Iceland)	0–2	(Greece) Olympiacos
		Gioutsos 23'; Stoligas 60'

Kaftanzoglio Stadium, Thessaloniki
Attendance: 8,000
Referee: Konstadin Dinov (Bulgaria)

Olympiacos won 4-0 on aggregate.

2 October 1968

West Bromwich Albion (England)	2–0	(Belgium) Club Brugge KV
Brown 14'; Hartford 43'

The Hawthorns, West Bromwich
Referee: Johan Einar Boström (Sweden)

3–3 on aggregate; West Bromwich Albion won on away goals.

2 October 1968

Torino (Italy)	3–1	(Albania) KS Partizani
Carelli 22'; Facchin 28'; Mondonico 59'		Bajko 85'

Stadio Comunale, Turin
Referee: Jozef Krňávek (Czechoslovakia)

Torino won 3-2 on aggregate.

2 October 1968

Porto (Portugal)	2–1	(Wales) Cardiff City
Pavão 9'; Custódio Pinto 76'		Toshack 51'

Estádio das Antas, Porto
Attendance: 55,000
Referee: Robert Héliès (France)

Porto won 4–3 on aggregate.

2 October 1968

Bor (Socialist Federal Republic of Yugoslavia)	2–0	(Czechoslovakia) Slovan Bratislava
Ranković 42'; Tomić 59'	Report

FK Bor Stadium, Bor
Referee: Efstathios Papavasiliou (Greece)

Slovan Bratislava won 3–2 on aggregate.

3 October 1968

GAK (Austria)	0–2	(Netherlands) ADO Den Haag
		Heijnen 16', 89'

Liebenauer Stadium, Graz
Referee: Othmar Huber (Switzerland)

ADO Den Haag won 6–1 on aggregate.

2 October 1968

1. FC Köln (West Germany)	3–0	(France) Girondins Bordeaux
Blusch 20'; Overath 22'; Rühl 53' (pen.)

Müngersdorfer Stadion, Cologne
Referee: Leo Callaghan (Wales)

1. FC Köln won 4–2 on aggregate.

2 October 1968

Shamrock Rovers (Republic of Ireland)	1–2	(Denmark) Randers
Fullam 53'		Gaardsøe 22'; Andreasen 57'

Glenmalure Park, Dublin
Referee: Michel Kitabdjian (France)

Randers won 3–1 on aggregate.

29 September 1968

Sliema Wanderers (Malta)	1–0	(Luxembourg) US Rumelange
Falzon 67'	Report

Empire Stadium, Gżira
Attendance: 12,929
Referee: Alessandro D'Agostini (Italy)

2–2 on aggregate; Sliema Wanderers won on away goals.

2 October 1968

Barcelona (Spain)	3–0	(Switzerland) Lugano
Mendonça 75', 90'; Zaldúa 83'

Camp Nou, Barcelona
Referee: John Paterson (Scotland)

Barcelona won 4–0 on aggregate.

2 October 1968

Lyn (Norway)	4–1	(Turkey) Altay
Knut Helmer Berg 40'; Johannessen 44', 70'; Jan Berg 89'		Denizli 54'

Ullevaal Stadion, Oslo
Referee: Steinn Guðmundsson (Iceland)

Lyn won 5–4 on aggregate.

2 October 1968

IFK Norrköping (Sweden)	4–1	(Northern Ireland) Crusaders
Norblad 10', 37'; Hultberg 21', 54'		McPolin 55'

Nya Parken, Norrköping
Referee: Tage Sørensen (Denmark)

IFK Norrköping won 6–3 on aggregate.

== Second round ==
Team 1	Agg.	Team 2	1st leg	2nd leg
Dunfermline Athletic (Scotland)	4–3	(Greece) Olympiacos	4–0	0–3
Dinamo București (Romania)	1–5	(England) West Bromwich Albion	1–1	0–4
Torino (Italy)	Bye		n/a	n/a
Porto (Portugal)	1–4	(Czechoslovakia) Slovan Bratislava	1–0	0–4
ADO Den Haag (Netherlands)	0–4	(West Germany) 1. FC Köln	0–1	0–3
Randers (Denmark)	8–0	(Malta) Sliema Wanderers	6–0	2–0
Barcelona (Spain)	Bye		n/a	n/a
Lyn (Norway)	4–3	(Sweden) IFK Norrkoping	2–0	2–3

=== First leg ===
13 November 1968

Dunfermline Athletic (Scotland)	4–0	(Greece) Olympiacos
Mitchell 48'; Edwards 55', 77'; Fraser 80'

East End Park, Dunfermline
Referee: Henry Øberg (Norway)

13 November 1968

Dinamo București (Romania)	1–1	(England) West Bromwich Albion
Dumitrache 23'	Report	Hartford 28'

Stadionul 23 August, Bucharest
Attendance: 15,000
Referee: Hans-Joachim Weyland (West Germany)

13 November 1968

Porto (Portugal)	1–0	(Czechoslovakia) Slovan Bratislava
Custódio Pinto 34'

Estádio das Antas, Porto
Attendance: 20,748
Referee: Malcolm Wright (Northern Ireland)

12 November 1968

ADO Den Haag (Netherlands)	0–1	(West Germany) 1. FC Köln
		Jendrossek 88'

Zuiderpark Stadium, The Hague
Referee: Roger Mâchin (France)

13 November 1968

Randers (Denmark)	6–0	(Malta) Sliema Wanderers
Berg Andersen 3', 85'; Olesen 35'; Bødker 53'; Sørensen 55'; Lykke 65' (pen.)

Randers Stadium, Randers
Referee: Jacques Colling (Luxembourg)

31 October 1968

Lyn (Norway)	2–0	(Sweden) IFK Norrkoping
Knut Helmer Berg 40'; Harald Berg 57'

Ullevaal Stadion, Oslo
Referee: Vital Loraux (Belgium)

=== Second leg ===
27 November 1968

Olympiacos (Greece)	3–0	(Scotland) Dunfermline Athletic
Stoligas 10'; Botinos 29'; Vasiliou 32'

Karaiskakis Stadium, Piraeus
Referee: Jozef Krňávek (Czechoslovakia)

Dunfermline Athletic won 4–3 on aggregate.

27 November 1968

West Bromwich Albion (England)	4–0	(Romania) Dinamo București
Lovett 35'; Brown 44', 52' (pen.); Astle 72'	Report

The Hawthorns, West Bromwich
Attendance: 33,059
Referee: Robert Hélies (France)

West Bromwich Albion won 5–1 on aggregate.

27 November 1968

Slovan Bratislava (Czechoslovakia)	4–0	(Portugal) Porto
Ján Čapkovič 22'; Jokl 48', 88' (pen.); Jozef Čapkovič 84'

Tehelné pole, Bratislava
Attendance: 7,776
Referee: Doğan Babacan (Turkey)

Slovan Bratislava won 4–1 on aggregate.

27 November 1968

1. FC Köln (West Germany)	3–0	(Netherlands) ADO Den Haag
Löhr 3', 53'; Blusch 72'

Müngersdorfer Stadion, Cologne
Referee: Ronald Jones (Wales)

1. FC Köln won 4–0 on aggregate.

27 November 1968

Sliema Wanderers (Malta)	0–2	(Denmark) Randers
		Gaardsøe 23', 65'

Empire Stadium, Gżira
Referee: Antonio Sbardella (Italy)

Randers won 8–0 on aggregate.

17 November 1968

IFK Norrkoping (Sweden)	3–2	(Norway) Lyn
Hultberg 1', 51'; Hesselgren 65'		Harald Berg 40'; Austnes 50'

Nya Parken, Norrköping
Referee: Martti Hirviniemi (Finland)

Lyn won 4–3 on aggregate.

== Quarter-finals ==
Team 1	Agg.	Team 2	1st leg	2nd leg
Dunfermline Athletic (Scotland)	1–0	(England) West Bromwich Albion	0–0	1–0
Torino (Italy)	1–3	(Czechoslovakia) Slovan Bratislava	0–1	1–2
1. FC Köln (West Germany)	5–1	(Denmark) Randers	2–1	3–0
Barcelona (Spain)	5–4	(Norway) Lyn	3–2	2–2^{1}

^{1} The match was played in Barcelona.

=== First leg ===
15 January 1969

Dunfermline Athletic (Scotland)	0–0	(England) West Bromwich Albion

East End Park, Dunfermline
Referee: Helmut Fritz (West Germany)

19 February 1969

Torino (Italy)	0–1	(Czechoslovakia) Slovan Bratislava
		Jokl 54'

Stadio Comunale, Turin
Referee: Antonio Saldanha (Portugal)

8 March 1969

1. FC Köln (West Germany)	2–1	(Denmark) Randers
Jendrossek 34'; Biskup 89'		Gaardsøe 42'

Müngersdorfer Stadion, Cologne
Referee: Jozef Krňávek (Czechoslovakia)

30 January 1969

Barcelona (Spain)	3–2	(Norway) Lyn
Zaldúa 11'; Pellicer 24'; Gallego 60'		Berg 38'; Dybwad-Olsen 78'

Camp Nou, Barcelona
Referee: Jim Finney (England)

=== Second leg ===
19 February 1969

West Bromwich Albion (England)	0–1	(Scotland) Dunfermline Athletic
		Gardner 2'

The Hawthorns, West Bromwich
Referee: William O'Neill (Republic of Ireland)

Dunfermline Athletic won 1–0 on aggregate.

5 March 1969

Slovan Bratislava (Czechoslovakia)	2–1	(Italy) Torino
Horváth 25'; Hlavenka 62'	Report	Carelli 88'

Tehelné pole, Bratislava
Attendance: 30,000
Referee: Paul Schiller (Austria)

Slovan Bratislava won 3–1 on aggregate.

12 March 1969

Randers (Denmark)	0–3	(West Germany) 1. FC Köln
		Biskup 24'; Rühl 70', 83'

Randers Stadium, Randers
Referee: Hubert Burguet (Belgium)

1. FC Köln won 5–1 on aggregate.

8 February 1969

Lyn (Norway)	2–2	(Spain) Barcelona
Johannessen 29', 54'		Gallego 75', 83'

Camp Nou, Barcelona
Referee: Robert Héliès (France)

Barcelona won 5–4 on aggregate.

== Semi-finals ==
Team 1	Agg.	Team 2	1st leg	2nd leg
Dunfermline Athletic (Scotland)	1–2	(Czechoslovakia) Slovan Bratislava	1–1	0–1
1. FC Köln (West Germany)	3–6	(Spain) Barcelona	2–2	1–4

=== First leg ===
9 April 1969

Dunfermline Athletic (Scotland)	1–1	(Czechoslovakia) Slovan Bratislava
Fraser 44'	Report	Ján Čapkovič 83'

East End Park, Dunfermline
Attendance: 25,000
Referee: Kurt Tschenscher (West Germany)

2 April 1969

1. FC Köln (West Germany)	2–2	(Spain) Barcelona
Löhr 7'; Rühl 75'		Zabalza 23'; Fusté 79'

Müngersdorfer Stadion, Cologne
Referee: Leo Callaghan (Wales)

=== Second leg ===
23 April 1969

Slovan Bratislava (Czechoslovakia)	1–0	(Scotland) Dunfermline Athletic
Ján Čapkovič 24'	Report

Tehelné pole, Bratislava
Attendance: 30,000
Referee: Joszip Horvat (Yugoslavia)

Slovan Bratislava won 2–1 on aggregate.

19 April 1969

Barcelona (Spain)	4–1	(West Germany) 1. FC Köln
Martí Filosia 6'; Fusté 53', 67', 80'		Rühl 17'

Camp Nou, Barcelona
Referee: Antonio Sbardella (Italy)

Barcelona won 6–3 on aggregate.

== Final ==
21 May 1969
19:00

Barcelona (Spain)	2–3	(Czechoslovakia) Slovan Bratislava
Zaldúa 16'; Rexach 52'	Report; Report 2	Cvetler 2'; Hrivnák 30'; Ján Čapkovič 42'

St. Jakob Stadium, Basel
Attendance: 19,478
Referee: Laurens van Ravens (Netherlands)

== Top scorers ==
The top scorers from the 1968–69 European Cup Winners' Cup are as follows:

Rank	Name	Team	Goals
1	(West Germany) Carl-Heinz Rühl	(West Germany) 1. FC Köln	6
2	(Denmark) Per Gaardsøe	(Denmark) Randers	5
2	(Sweden) Ulf Hultberg	(Sweden) IFK Norrköping	5
2	(Czechoslovakia) Karol Jokl	(Czechoslovakia) Slovan Bratislava	5
4	(Czechoslovakia) Ján Čapkovič	(Czechoslovakia) Slovan Bratislava	4
4	(Spain) Josep Maria Fusté	(Spain) Barcelona	4
4	(Norway) Karl Johan Johannessen	(Norway) Lyn	4
4	(Portugal) Custódio Pinto	(Portugal) Porto	4
