= 1968–71 Nordic Football Championship =

Tournament details
- Host countries: Denmark; Finland; Norway; Sweden
- Dates: 4 June 1968 – 26 September 1971
- Teams: 4

Final positions
- Champions: Sweden (8th title)
- Runners-up: Denmark
- Third place: Norway
- Fourth place: Finland

Tournament statistics
- Matches played: 24
- Goals scored: 82 (3.42 per match)
- Top scorer(s): (Norway) Odd Iversen (6 goals)

The 1968–71 Nordic Football Championship was the tenth tournament staged. Four Nordic countries participated: Denmark, Finland, Norway and Sweden. Sweden won the tournament, its eighth Nordic Championship win.

== Results ==
=== 1968 ===
4 June 1968
19:00 (UTC+2:00)

Finland	1-3	Denmark
Tolsa 60'	Report	Lund 3', 79'; Le Fevre 18'

Olympic Stadium, Helsinki
Attendance: 16,082
Referee: Sven Jonsson (Sweden)
23 June 1968
13:30 (UTC+1:00)

Denmark	5-1	Norway
Troelsen 22', 24', 77'; Larsen 42', 55'	Report	Presberg 2'

Idrætsparken, Copenhagen
Attendance: 31,900
Referee: Arvo Jokinen (Finland)
27 June 1968
19:00 (UTC+1:00)

Sweden	2-1	Denmark
Lindman 18'; Nordahl 52'	Report	Nordqvist 28' (o.g.)

Råsunda Stadium, Stockholm
Attendance: 14,489
Referee: Johan Riseth (Norway)
18 August 1968
18:00 (UTC+1:00)

Norway	4-1	Finland
Iversen 36', 52'; Dybwad-Olsen 60'; Berg 85'	Report	Tosla 75'

Ullevaal Stadion, Oslo
Attendance: 18,291
Referee: Carl Werner Hansen (Denmark)
11 September 1968
18:30 (UTC+2:00)

Finland	0-3	Sweden
	Report	Eriksson 33'; Andersson 63'; Selander 68'

Olympic Stadium, Helsinki
Attendance: 16,839
Referee: Karl Riegg (West Germany)
15 September 1968
13:15 (UTC+1:00)

Norway	1-1	Sweden
Dybwad-Olsen 30'	Report	Eriksson 17'

Ullevaal Stadion, Oslo
Attendance: 23,564
Referee: Janus Aalbrecht (Netherlands)

=== 1969 ===
22 May 1969
19:00 (UTC+1:00)

Sweden	4-0	Finland
Johansson 6', 75'; Svensson 58'; Kautonen 86' (o.g.)	Report

Visma Arena, Växjö
Attendance: 15,868
Referee: Frede Hansen (Denmark)
1 June 1969
17:00 (UTC+1:00)

Sweden	4-2	Norway
Pålsson 8'; Ejderstedt 9', 25'; Andersson 69'	Report	Iversen 7'; Berg 70'

Ullevi Gothenburg
Attendance: 25,671
Referee: Kevin Howley (England)
25 June 1969
19:00 (UTC+1:00)

Denmark	0-1	Sweden
	Report	Eklund 62'

Idrætsparken, Copenhagen
Attendance: 50,100
Referee: Henry Øberg (Norway)
24 August 1969
18:30 (UTC+2:00)

Finland	2-2	Norway
Tolsa 5'; Lindholm 13'	Report	Iversen 21', 29'

Olympic Stadium, Helsinki
Attendance: 10,727
Referee: Einar Boström (Sweden)
10 September 1969
19:00 (UTC+1:00)

Denmark	5-2	Finland
Jensen 12', 14', 43'; Larsen 25', 71'	Report	Lindholm 3'; Tolsa 90'

Idrætsparken, Copenhagen
Attendance: 22,600
Referee: Theo Boosten (Netherlands)
21 September 1969
13:15 (UTC+1:00)

Norway	2-0	Denmark
Dybwad-Olsen 26'; Sæthrang 35'	Report

Ullevaal Stadion, Oslo
Attendance: 12,883
Referee: Martti Hirviniemi (Finland)

=== 1970 ===
3 June 1970
19:00 (UTC+2:00)

Finland	1-1	Denmark
Pedersen 48'	Report	Tolsa 58'

Olympic Stadium, Helsinki
Attendance: 8,044
Referee: Norman Burtenshaw (England)
17 June 1970
18:30 (UTC+1:00)

Norway	2-0	Finland
Paulsen 59'; Seemann 76'	Report

Brann Stadion, Bergen
Attendance: 12,877
Referee: Gerhard Kunze (East Germany)
25 June 1970
19:00 (UTC+1:00)

Sweden	1-1	Denmark
Pålsson 48'	Report	Pedersen 73'

Ullevi, Gothenburg
Attendance: 26,863
Referee: Väinö Toivola (Finland)
26 August 1970
19:00 (UTC+2:00)

Finland	1-2	Sweden
Lindholm 89' (pen.)	Report	Almqvist 50'; Brzokoupil 67'

Olympic Stadium, Helsinki
Attendance: 17,070
Referee: Henry Øberg (Norway)
13 September 1970
13:15 (UTC+1:00)

Norway	2-4	Sweden
Nilsen 9'; Fuglset 28' (pen.)	Report	Danielsson 26'; Brzokoupil 56'; Svensson 60', 87'

Ullevaal Stadion, Oslo
Attendance: 12,338
Referee: Kaj Rasmussen (Denmark)
23 September 1970
19:00 (UTC+1:00)

Denmark	0-1	Norway
	Report	Iversen 56'

Idrætsparken, Copenhagen
Attendance: 27,300
Referee: Einar Boström (Sweden)

=== 1971 ===
20 May 1971
14:00 (UTC+1:00)

Sweden	4-1	Finland
Larsson 56'; Svensson 69'; Persson 71'; Pålsson 90'	Report	Paatelainen 6'

Ryavallen, Borås
Attendance: 13,020
Referee: Hans-Joachim Weyland (West Germany)
20 June 1971
13:30 (UTC+1:00)

Denmark	1-3	Sweden
Bjerre 39'	Report	Grahn 5', 44'; Eklund 27'

Idrætsparken, Copenhagen
Attendance: 47,300
Referee: Walter Eschweiler (West Germany)
8 August 1971
18:00 (UTC+1:00)

Sweden	3-0	Norway
Sandberg 35'; Pålsson 44'; Larsson 83' (pen.)	Report

Malmö Stadion Malmö
Attendance: 15,011
Referee: Martti Hirviniemi (Finland)
25 August 1971
19:00 (UTC+2:00)

Finland	1-1	Norway
Suhonen 71'	Report	Fuglset 1' (pen.)

Olympic Stadium, Helsinki
Attendance: 6,225
Referee: Kaj Sørensen (Denmark)
8 September 1971
19:00 (UTC+1:00)

Denmark	0-0	Finland
	Report

Idrætsparken, Copenhagen
Attendance: 14,000
Referee: Rolf Hennum Andersen (Norway)
26 September 1971
13:15 (UTC+1:00)

Norway	1-4	Denmark
Fuglset 28'	Report	Schriver 8', 18'; Nygaard 16'; Markussen 86'

Ullevaal Stadion, Oslo
Attendance: 11,217
Referee: Einar Boström (Sweden)

== Table ==
The table is compiled by awarding two points for a victory, one point for a draw, and no points for a loss.

	Team	Pld	W	D	L	GF	GA	GD	Pts
1	Sweden	12	10	2	0	32	10	+22	22
2	Denmark	12	4	3	5	21	16	+5	11
3	Norway	12	4	3	5	19	25	–6	11
4	Finland	12	0	4	8	10	31	–21	4

== Winners ==
1968–71 Nordic Football Championship winners

Sweden
Eighth title

== Statistics ==
=== Goalscorers ===
There were 82 goals scored in 24 matches, for an average of 3.42 goals per match.

6 goals

- (Norway) Odd Iversen

5 goals

- (Finland) Arto Tolsa

4 goals

- (Denmark) Steen Rømer Larsen
- (Sweden) Sten Pålsson
- (Sweden) Tommy Svensson

3 goals

- (Denmark) Bent Jensen
- (Denmark) Tommy Troelsen
- (Finland) Tommy Lindholm
- (Norway) Ola Dybwad-Olsen

2 goals

- (Denmark) Keld Pedersen
- (Denmark) Karsten Lund
- (Denmark) Iver Schriver
- (Norway) Jan Fuglset
- (Norway) Harald Berg
- (Sweden) Bo Larsson
- (Sweden) Dan Brzokoupil
- (Sweden) Inge Ejderstedt
- (Sweden) Hans Johansson
- (Sweden) Leif Eriksson
- (Sweden) Ove Grahn
- (Sweden) Ove Eklund
- (Sweden) Rolf Andersson

1 goal

- (Denmark) Kresten Bjerre
- (Denmark) Kristen Nygaard
- (Denmark) Jørgen Markussen
- (Denmark) Ulrik Le Fevre
- (Finland) Heikki Suhonen
- (Finland) Matti Paatelainen
- (Norway) Finn Seemann
- (Norway) Hans Edgar Paulsen
- (Norway) Olav Nilsen
- (Norway) Pål Sæthrang
- (Norway) Tor Fuglset
- (Norway) Thorodd Presberg
- (Sweden) Hans Selander
- (Sweden) Inge Danielsson
- (Sweden) Örjan Persson
- (Sweden) Roland Sandberg
- (Sweden) Reine Almqvist
- (Sweden) Sven Lindman
- (Sweden) Thomas Nordahl

2 own goals

- (Sweden) Björn Nordqvist (against Denmark)
- (Finland) Timo Kautonen (against Sweden)

== See also ==
Balkan Cup
Baltic Cup
Central European International Cup
Mediterranean Cup
