= 1968 in Norwegian football =

Football in Norway
- Season: 1968

Men's football
- 1. divisjon: Lyn
- 2. divisjon: Start (Group A); Hødd (Group B)
- Cupen: Lyn

The 1968 season was the 63rd season of competitive football in Norway.

== Men's football ==
=== League season ===
==== Promotion and relegation ====
League	Promoted to league	Relegated from league
1. divisjon	Brann; Viking	Odd; Steinkjer
2. divisjon	Pors; Hamarkameratene; Vard; Aalesund	Lisleby; Snøgg; Nidelv; Kvik

==== 1. divisjon ====
Lyn Fotball won their second league title in 1968.

Pos	Team	Pld	W	D	L	GF	GA	GD	Pts	Qualification or relegation
1	Lyn (C)	18	14	0	4	57	33	+24	28	Qualification for the European Cup first round
2	Rosenborg	18	11	2	5	53	29	+24	24	Qualification for the Inter-Cities Fairs Cup first round
3	Viking	18	9	3	6	34	32	+2	21	
4	Strømsgodset	18	9	1	8	48	27	+21	19	
5	Brann	18	8	3	7	31	32	−1	19	
6	Skeid	18	9	1	8	22	33	−11	19	Qualification for the Inter-Cities Fairs Cup first round
7	Sarpsborg FK	18	5	5	8	14	25	−11	15	
8	Fredrikstad	18	6	2	10	28	34	−6	14	
9	Frigg (R)	18	3	5	10	15	37	−22	11	Relegation to Second Division
10	Vålerengen (R)	18	3	4	11	18	38	−20	10	Relegation to Second Division

Source: NIFS
Rules for classification: 1) points; 2) goal difference; 3) number of goals scored.
(C) Champions; (R) Relegated

==== 2. divisjon ====
===== Group A =====
Pos	Team	Pld	W	D	L	GF	GA	GD	Pts	Promotion, qualification or relegation
1	Start (C, P)	14	11	2	1	36	18	+18	24	Promotion to First Division
2	Bryne	14	9	1	4	37	25	+12	19	
3	Pors	14	5	5	4	21	19	+2	15	
4	Vigør	14	5	2	7	19	23	−4	12	
5	Eik	14	4	4	6	15	19	−4	12	
6	Ørn	14	4	3	7	26	29	−3	11	
7	Odd (R)	14	4	3	7	22	25	−3	11	Relegation to Third Division
8	Vard (R)	14	3	2	9	24	42	−18	8	Relegation to Third Division

Source: rsssf.no
Rules for classification: 1) points; 2) goal difference; 3) number of goals scored.
(C) Champions; (P) Promoted; (R) Relegated

===== Group B =====
Pos	Team	Pld	W	D	L	GF	GA	GD	Pts	Promotion, qualification or relegation
1	Hødd (C, P)	14	7	5	2	22	12	+10	19	Promotion to First Division
2	Aalesund	14	8	2	4	27	15	+12	18	
3	Hamarkameratene	14	8	2	4	23	17	+6	18	
4	Mjøndalen	14	6	4	4	32	18	+14	16	Qualification for the Cup Winners' Cup first round (Note: As Lyn qualified for the European Cup, their European Cup Winners' Cup place as Norwegian Cup winners defaulted to Mjøndalen, the runners-up.)
5	Raufoss	14	4	5	5	20	20	0	13	
6	Aurskog	14	4	3	7	17	21	−4	11	
7	Steinkjer (R)	14	3	3	8	18	38	−20	9	Relegation to Third Division
8	Gjøvik-Lyn (R)	14	1	6	7	20	38	−18	8	Relegation to Third Division

Source: rsssf.no
Rules for classification: 1) points; 2) goal difference; 3) number of goals scored.
(C) Champions; (P) Promoted; (R) Relegated

=== Norwegian Cup ===
Lyn won the 1968 Norwegian Football Cup, completing the domestic double alongside their league championship. It was their second consecutive cup win.

==== Final ====
27 October 1968

Lyn	3–0	Mjøndalen
Dybwad-Olsen 39'; J. Berg 81'; H. Berg 89'	Report

Ullevaal Stadion, Oslo
Attendance: 21,101
Referee: Henry Øberg (Hamar)

== Northern Norwegian Cup ==
=== Final ===
Harstad	3–1	Mjølner
	Report

== UEFA competitions ==
=== European Cup ===
==== First round ====
Team 1	Agg.	Team 2	1st leg	2nd leg
Rosenborg (Norway)	4–6	(Austria) Rapid Wien	1–3	3–3

=== European Cup Winners' Cup ===
==== First round ====
Team 1	Agg.	Team 2	1st leg	2nd leg
Altay (Turkey)	4–5	(Norway) SFK Lyn	3–1	1–4

==== Second round ====
Team 1	Agg.	Team 2	1st leg	2nd leg
SFK Lyn (Norway)	4–3	(Sweden) IFK Norrköping	2–0	2–3

==== Quarter-finals ====
Team 1	Agg.	Team 2	1st leg	2nd leg
Barcelona (Spain)	5–4	(Norway) SFK Lyn	3–2	2–2 (in Barcelona)

=== Inter-Cities Fairs Cup ===
==== First round ====
Team 1	Agg.	Team 2	1st leg	2nd leg
Skeid (Norway)	2–3	(Sweden) AIK	1–1	1–2

== National team ==
9 June 1968 Friendly	Norway	1–6	Poland	Oslo, Norway
	Harald Sunde 41'		Włodzimierz Lubański 14', 77'; Andrzej Jarosik 21', 38', 55'; Janusz Żmijewski 71'	Stadium: Ullevaal Stadion; Attendance: 26,861; Referee: Johan Einar Boström

23 June 1968 1968–71 Nordic Championship	Denmark	5–1	Norway	Copenhagen, Denmark
	Tommy Troelsen 22', 24', 77' (pen.); Steen Larsen 44', 55'		Thorodd Presberg 2'	Stadium: Idrætsparken; Attendance: 32,900; Referee: Arvo Jokinen

18 July 1968 Friendly	Iceland	0–4	Norway	Reykjavík, Iceland
			Olav Nilsen 11'; Harald Berg 28', 33'; Dybwad-Olsen 90'	Stadium: Laugardalsvöllur; Attendance: 4,867; Referee: Owen McCarthy

18 August 1968 1968–71 Nordic Championship	Norway	4–1	Finland	Oslo, Norway
	Odd Iversen 36', 52'; Dybwad-Olsen 60'; Harald Berg 85'		Arto Tolsa 75'	Stadium: Ullevaal Stadion; Attendance: 18,276; Referee: Carl W. Hansen

15 September 1968 1968–71 Nordic Championship	Norway	1–1	Sweden	Oslo, Norway
	Dybwad-Olsen 30'		Leif Eriksson 23'	Stadium: Ullevaal Stadion; Attendance: 23,564; Referee: Adrianus Aalbrecht

9 October 1968 1970 FIFA World Cup Q	Sweden	5–0	Norway	Stockholm, Sweden
	Kindvall 38', 58', 61'; B. Larsson 56', 81'	Report		Stadium: Råsunda; Attendance: 32,063; Referee: Pekko Aho (Finland)

6 November 1968 1970 FIFA World Cup Q	France	0–1	Norway	Strasbourg, France
		Report	Iversen 67'	Stadium: Stade de la Meinau; Attendance: 18,319; Referee: Francesco Francesconi (Italy)
