= 1966 Norwegian Football Cup =

Norgesmesterskapet i fotball for menn 1966

Tournament details
- Country: Norway
- Teams: 128 (main competition)

Final positions
- Champions: Fredrikstad (9th title)
- Runners-up: Lyn

The 1966 Norwegian Football Cup was the 61st edition of the Norwegian annual knockout football tournament. The Cup was won by Fredrikstad after beating Lyn in the cup final with the score 3–2. This was Fredrikstad's ninth Norwegian Cup title.

== First round ==
Team 1	Score	Team 2
Aurskog	5–2	Skotterud
Bodø/Glimt	1–0	Nessegutten
Brann	3–1	Sandviken
Braatt	0–2	Kristiansund
Brumunddal	1–3	Kongsvinger
Bryne	3–1	Haugar
Clausenengen	3–4	Langevåg
Drafn	3–4 (a.e.t.)	Sandefjord BK
Drammens BK	1–1 (a.e.t.)	Strømsgodset
Eid	2–2 (a.e.t.)	Sandane
Erdal	2–4	Varegg
Flekkefjord	1–2	Vidar
Fredrikstad	4–2	Navestad
Fremad Lillehammer	0–8	Gjøvik-Lyn
Frigg	5–2	Kampørn
Grane (Arendal)	1–0	Jerv
Greåker	1–1 (a.e.t.)	Moss
Gvarv	1–1 (a.e.t.)	Fram (Skatval)
Halsen	1–3	Runar
Hamar	10–0	Brekken
Harstad	2–0	Narvik/Nor
Hasselvika	0–9	Nidelv
Herd	3–0	Spjelkavik
Hødd	3–1	Velledalen/Ringen
Jarl	7–0	Mandalskameratene
Kopervik	0–4	Vard
Kvik (Trondheim)	3–0	Brekstad
Kvinesdal	1–0	Donn
Larvik Turn	1–0 (a.e.t.)	Herkules
Liv	1–2	Mjøndalen
Mesna	2–0	HamKam
Mjølner	5–0	Kirkenes
Molde	8–0	Søya
Ny-Krohnborg	0–0 (a.e.t.)	Baune
Nærbø	4–0	Ulf
Os	0–3	Florvåg
Pors	5–0	Øyestad
Randaberg	0–3	Viking
Raufoss	1–2	Jotun
Redalen	3–0 (a.e.t.)	Moelven
Rosenborg	6–1	Freidig
Røros	1–4	Løkken
Sem	0–4	Eik
Skiold	0–4	Skeid
Snøgg	1–1 (a.e.t.)	Kongsberg
Sogndal	0–1	Årstad
Sparta	2–0	Askim
Spartacus	0–1	Lillestrøm
Stange	2–1 (a.e.t.)	Sagene
Start	7–1	Sørfjell
Stavanger	2–1 (a.e.t.)	Buøy
Stjørdals/Blink	1–6	Steinkjer
Strømmen	3–2	Fenstad
Svelvik	0–5	Lyn
Sverre	0–2	Neset
Torp	2–3	Sarpsborg
Tune	2–1	Lisleby
Verdal	0–1	Falken
Vigør	3–1 (a.e.t.)	Våg
Vålerengen	2–1 (a.e.t.)	Slemmestad
Urædd	0–1	Odd
Ørn	4–0	Åssiden
Østsiden	4–1	Liull
Åndalsnes	1–7	Aalesund
Replay
Baune	4–2	Ny-Krohnborg
Fram (Skatval)	13–3	Gvarv
Moss	2–1 (a.e.t.)	Greåker
Kongsberg	0–7	Snøgg
Sandane	2–3	Eid
Strømsgodset	5–0	Drammens BK

== Second round ==
Team 1	Score	Team 2
Lyn	4–1	Østsiden
Varegg	1–3	Brann
Bodø/Glimt	2–1	Harstad
Bryne	4–1	Kvinesdal
Eik	6–0	Tune
Falken	1–0	Mesna
Florvåg	4–2	Baune
Fram (Skatval)	2–2 (a.e.t.)	Fredrikstad
Gjøvik-Lyn	4–2	Redalen
Grane (Arendal)	0–1	Start
Hamar	0–3	Vålerengen
Jarl	1–0	Årstad
Jotun	1–3	Snøgg
Kongsvinger	1–4	Frigg
Langevåg	2–1	Hødd
Larvik Turn	1–2	Sandefjord BK
Lillestrøm	3–0	Sparta
Løkken	0–1	Herd
Mjøndalen	1–2	Pors
Molde	1–0	Kristiansund
Moss	3–3 (a.e.t.)	Aurskog
Nidelv	2–1	Kvik (Trondheim)
Runar	0–1	Strømsgodset
Sarpsborg	2–0	Strømmen
Skeid	4–1	Stange
Steinkjer	3–0	Mjølner
Vard	3–4	Stavanger
Vidar	1–2 (a.e.t.)	Viking
Vigør	2–1	Nærbø
Aalesund	3–2	Eid
Odd	3–4	Ørn
Neset	4–6 (a.e.t.)	Rosenborg
Replay
Fredrikstad	4–1	Fram (Skatval)
Viking	2–0	Vidar
Aurskog	4–4 (a.e.t.)	Moss
2nd replay
Moss	1–3	Aurskog

== Third round ==
Team 1	Score	Team 2
31 July 1966
Fredrikstad	5–2 (a.e.t.)	Eik
Aurskog	3–0	Falken
Frigg	2–1	Aalesund
Strømsgodset	2–2 (a.e.t.)	Bryne
Snøgg	2–3	Vigør
Start	2–1	Sandefjord BK
Jarl	1–2	Gjøvik-Lyn
Molde	1–5	Nidelv
Rosenborg	5–0	Langevåg
Bodø/Glimt	3–4	Lyn
1 August 1966
Brann	5–1 (a.e.t.)	Florvåg
2 August 1966
Viking	4–0	Stavanger
3 August 1966
Ørn	1–3	Skeid
Pors	0–1	Sarpsborg
Herd	2–3 (a.e.t.)	Steinkjer
Vålerengen	4–1	Lillestrøm
Replay: 10 August 1966
Bryne	2–1 (a.e.t.)	Strømsgodset

== Fourth round ==
Team 1	Score	Team 2
21 August 1966
Steinkjer	8–0	Aurskog
Bryne	3–3 (a.e.t.)	Frigg
Sarpsborg	1–3	Viking
Lyn	6–3	Brann
Gjøvik-Lyn	5–3	Rosenborg
Nidelv	2–3	Vålerengen
Skeid	2–0 (a.e.t.)	Start
Vigør	1–5	Fredrikstad
Replay: 31 August 1966
Frigg	4–0	Bryne

== Quarter-finals ==
Team 1	Score	Team 2
4 September 1966
Viking	3–0	Steinkjer
Frigg	2–6	Lyn
Fredrikstad	3–0	Vålerengen
Gjøvik-Lyn	3–1	Skeid

== Semi-finals ==
2 October 1966

Fredrikstad	2–1	Viking
Aas 27'; Kristoffersen 30'		Kvia 36'

Fredrikstad Stadion, Fredrikstad
Attendance: 12,600
Referee: Sverre Eugen Olsen

2 October 1966

Lyn	7–0	Gjøvik-Lyn
J. Berg 12', 44', 80'; H. Berg 29', 40'; Østlien 61'; Stavrum 85'

Ullevaal Stadion, Oslo
Attendance: 10,809
Referee: Kåre Sirevåg

== Final ==
30 October 1966

Fredrikstad	3–2	Lyn
Borgen 33', 59'; Pedersen 89' (pen.)	Report	H. Berg 54'; Stavrum 67'

Ullevaal Stadion, Oslo
Attendance: 30,335
Referee: Hans Granlund (Heggedal)

Fredrikstad's winning team: Per Mosgaard, Kjell Andreassen, Jan Hermansen, Arne Pedersen, Hans Jacob Mathisen, Roar Johansen, Bjørn Borgen, Tore Hansen, Per Kristoffersen, Thor Spydevold and Jan Aas.

Lyn's team: Svein Bjørn Olsen, Harald Berg, Jan Berg, Arild Gulden, Knut Kolle, Andreas Morisbak, Jan Rodvang, Kjell Saga, Ole Stavrum, Einar With and Svein Bredo Østlien.
