= 1967 Norwegian Football Cup =

Norgesmesterskapet i fotball for menn 1967

Tournament details
- Country: Norway
- Teams: 128 (main competition)

Final positions
- Champions: Lyn (7th title)
- Runners-up: Rosenborg

The 1967 Norwegian Football Cup was the 62nd edition of the Norwegian annual knockout football tournament. The Cup was won by Lyn after beating Rosenborg in the cup final with the score 4–1. This was Lyn's seventh Norwegian Cup title.

== First round ==
Team 1	Score	Team 2
Arna	2–0	Nymark
Asker	1–2	Stabæk
Askim	2–3	Østsiden
Aurskog	4–1	Bjørkelangen
Baune	0–2	Brann
Bodø/Glimt	2–1	Harstad
Brage	2–1 (a.e.t.)	Verdal
Brekstad	3–2	Løkken
Brumunddal	1–2	Mesna
Drafn	2–2 (a.e.t.)	Snøgg
Eidsvold Turn	2–3 (a.e.t.)	Vålerengen
Eik	7–1	Halsen
Falken	2–2 (a.e.t.)	Kvik (Trondheim)
Flekkefjord	1–3	Buøy
Flå	0–2	Rosenborg
Fram (Larvik)	7–1	Rygene
Fåberg	1–6	Raufoss
Gjøvik-Lyn	6–1	Lena
Hamar	3–2	Nordre Trysil
HamKam	5–0	Stange
Heddal	0–2	Strømsgodset
Jerv	1–6	Pors
Kongsberg	1–3	Larvik Turn
Kristiansund	3–1	Todalen
Kvik (Halden)	0–6	Fredrikstad
Lillestrøm	3–2	Grue
Lisleby	2–2 (a.e.t.)	Sprint/Jeløy
Lyn	7–2	Ready
Mjølner	2–0	Stein
Mjøndalen	5–0	Svelvik
Molde	3–0	Clausenengen
Moss	6–1	Sparta
Namsos	0–1	Mo
Nidelv	1–1 (a.e.t.)	Freidig
Odd	2–1	Stag
Odda	2–1 (a.e.t.)	Ny-Krohnborg
Os	0–1	Haugar
Randaberg	2–4	Jarl
Raumnes & Årnes	2–3	Strømmen
Runar	2–2 (a.e.t.)	Åssiden
Røros	5–1	Moelven
Sagene	4–1	Nannestad
Sandefjord BK	1–0	Skiold
Sarpsborg	3–0	Greåker
Skeid	5–0	Liull
Spjelkavik	0–2	Hødd
Steinkjer	3–0	Nessegutten
Sverre	1–2	Melhus
Sørfjell	4–5	Brevik
Vard	5–0	Bremnes
Vardal	0–1	Sogndal
Varegg	5–2	Florvåg
Velledalen/Ringen	0–3	Langevåg
Vidar	2–0	Vindbjart
Vigør	1–0 (a.e.t.)	Donn
Viking	3–0	Ulf
Våg	0–5	Start
Ørn	3–0	Sem
Ørsta	0–1	Herd
Øvrevoll	0–5	Frigg
Øyestad	1–4	Grane
Aalesund	2–1	Skarbøvik
Ålgård	0–1	Bryne
Årstad	2–0	Sandviken
Replay
Freidig	2–1	Nidelv
Kvik (Trondheim)	3–0	Falken
Snøgg	1–3	Drafn
Sprint/Jeløy	2–3	Lisleby
Åssiden	1–0	Runar

== Second round ==
Team 1	Score	Team 2
Aurskog	3–1 (a.e.t.)	Lisleby
Brann	4–3	Arna
Brevik	1–0	Odd
Bryne	2–0	Buøy
Drafn	1–1 (a.e.t.)	Fram (Larvik)
Fredrikstad	3–0	Lillestrøm
Freidig	1–3	Brekstad
Grane	1–7	Vigør
Haugar	2–7	Vard
Herd	2–1	Aalesund
Hødd	4–0	Langevåg
Jarl	0–5	Viking
Larvik Turn	1–2 (a.e.t.)	Ørn
Lyn	2–1	Sagene
Melhus	2–5	Kvik (Trondheim)
Mesna	0–1	Gjøvik-Lyn
Mo	1–1 (a.e.t.)	Mjølner
Molde	9–0	Kristiansund
Odda	0–2	Årstad
Pors	1–0	Eik
Raufoss	3–1	Hamar
Rosenborg	3–0	Bodø/Glimt
Røros	2–2 (a.e.t.)	HamKam
Sandefjord BK	2–3 (a.e.t.)	Mjøndalen
Sogndal	0–1	Varegg
Stabæk	2–1	Sarpsborg
Start	3–2 (a.e.t.)	Vidar
Steinkjer	4–1	Brage
Strømmen	3–1	Frigg
Strømsgodset	3–1	Åssiden
Vålerengen	4–1	Moss
Østsiden	2–1	Skeid
Replay
HamKam	2–0	Røros
Fram (Larvik)	3–0	Drafn
Mjølner	1–3	Mo

== Third round ==
Team 1	Score	Team 2
21 June 1967
Vigør	2–2 (a.e.t.)	Pors
Hødd	3–1	Herd
Mjøndalen	4–1	Østsiden
22 June 1967
Viking	5–1	Stabæk
Ørn	1–3	Fredrikstad
Varegg	4–2	Start
Vard	1–2	Brann
25 June 1967
Vålerengen	3–2 (a.e.t.)	Bryne
Årstad	0–3	Lyn
Brekstad	0–4	Steinkjer
Rosenborg	4–1	Molde
Brevik	1–3	Strømsgodset
Fram (Larvik)	4–1	Aurskog
Mo	1–4	Kvik (Trondheim)
HamKam	3–0	Raufoss
Gjøvik-Lyn	4–0	Strømmen
Replay: 28 June 1967
Pors	5–1	Vigør

== Fourth round ==
Team 1	Score	Team 2
13 August 1967
Pors	1–4	Vålerengen
Fredrikstad	2–1	Gjøvik-Lyn
Lyn	3–0	Fram (Larvik)
Brann	5–2	Hødd
Strømsgodset	0–1	Mjøndalen
Kvik (Trondheim)	0–6	Viking
Steinkjer	3–1	Varegg
HamKam	1–4	Rosenborg

== Quarter-finals ==
Team 1	Score	Team 2
27 August 1967
Brann	1–0	Steinkjer
Rosenborg	7–2	Fredrikstad
Mjøndalen	2–4	Lyn
Viking	0–1	Vålerengen

== Semi-finals ==
1 October 1967

Lyn	4–0	Vålerengen
H. Berg 10', 75'; K. Berg 13', 74'

Ullevaal Stadion, Oslo
Attendance: 13,847

1 October 1967

Rosenborg	3–1	Brann
Iversen 25'; Pedersen 29'; Sunde 41'		Sivertsen 67'

Lerkendal Stadion, Trondheim
Attendance: 25,953

== Final ==
29 October 1967
13:15 CET (UTC+1)

Lyn	4–1	Rosenborg
Dybwad-Olsen 10' (pen.); H. Berg 25', 42'; K. Berg 52' (pen.)	Report	Iversen 34'

Ullevaal Stadion, Oslo
Attendance: 27,389
Referee: Ivar Hornslien (Nydalen)

== Lyn's winning squad ==
Svein Bjørn Olsen, Jan Rodvang, Kjell Saga, Helge Østvold, Knut Kolle, Svein Bredo Østlien, Andreas Morisbak, Jan Berg, Harald Berg, Ola Dybwad-Olsen, Knut Berg, Reidar Tessem, Tom Ørehagen and Sveinung Aarnseth.
