= 1968 Norwegian Football Cup =

Norgesmesterskapet i fotball for menn 1968

Tournament details
- Country: Norway
- Teams: 128 (main competition)

Final positions
- Champions: Lyn (8th title)
- Runners-up: Mjøndalen

The 1968 Norwegian Football Cup was the 63rd season of the Norwegian annual knockout football tournament. The Final was held on 27 October 1968, between Lyn and Mjøndalen. Lyn won their eighth Norwegian Cup. Having won the league, Lyn qualified for the 1969–70 European Cup, with Mjøndalen qualifying for the 1969–70 European Cup Winners' Cup as runners-up.

== First round ==
Team 1	Score	Team 2
Askim	1–2	Lyn
Bodø/Glimt	2–1 (a.e.t.)	Alta
Brann	3–1	Ny-Krohnborg
Brekstad	1–2	Strinda
Brevik	3–4	Jerv
Bryne	2–0	Vidar
Clausenengen	1–0	Kristiansund
Eid	1–4	Herd
Eik	0–1	Larvik Turn
Falken	7–0	Løkken
Fram (Larvik)	9–1	Risør
Fredrikstad	1–1 (a.e.t.)	Borgen Sarpsborg
Fremad Lillehammer	2–0	Mesna
Frigg	5–0	Eidsvold Turn
Grane	0–2	Gvarv
Greåker	0–0 (a.e.t.)	Lisleby
Halsen	1–3	Odd
Hamar	0–1	Kapp
Harstad	1–2 (a.e.t.)	Mjølner
Hasle-Løren	0–2	Mjøndalen
Haugar	6–0	Randaberg
Heddal	2–1	Snøgg
Hødd	0–1	Skarbøvik
Jarl	1–6	Flekkefjord
Klepp	3–1	Viking
Kløfta	0–4	Aurskog
Langevåg	4–4 (a.e.t.)	Åndalsnes
Liv	3–1	Gjøvik-Lyn
Mo	2–1	Stålkameratene
Neset	1–2	Steinkjer
Nessegutten	4–4 (a.e.t.)	Namsos
Nordnes	0–0 (a.e.t.)	Årstad
Odda	1–4	Baune
Os	3–0	Nymark
Pors	1–0 (a.e.t.)	Runar
Rapid	2–2 (a.e.t.)	Sagene
Raufoss	4–1	Stange
Ready	1–3	Skeid
Redalen	0–2	HamKam
Rindal	2–3	Kvik (Trondheim)
Rosenborg	9–1	Hasselvika
Røros	1–2 (a.e.t.)	Nidelv
Selbak	4–1 (a.e.t.)	Ørn
Skotterud	3–2	Lillestrøm
Slemmestad	0–2	Drafn
Sogndal	3–0	Jotun
Sparta	1–2	Sarpsborg
Spjelkavik	2–2 (a.e.t.)	Molde
Stabæk	3–2	Østsiden
Stag	3–1	Svelvik
Start	4–0	Mandalskameratene
Stavanger	0–1	Vard
Strømmen	3–2	Grue
Strømsgodset	7–3	Liull
Sørfjell	2–1	Rygene
Ulf	2–0	Donn
Urædd	0–1	Sandefjord BK
Varegg	1–0	Arna
Velledalen/Ringen	2–2 (a.e.t.)	Aalesund
Verdal	3–2	Sverre
Vindbjart	1–2	Vigør
Vålerengen	3–0	Rosenhoff
Ålgård	3–1	Buøy
Åssiden	0–2	Moss
Replay
Borgen Sarpsborg	1–4	Fredrikstad
Lisleby	2–1	Greåker
Molde	3–0	Spjelkavik
Namsos	1–2 (a.e.t.)	Nessegutten
Sagene	5–2	Rapid
Aalesund	2–0	Velledalen/Ringen
Åndalsnes	0–1	Langevåg
Årstad	6–1	Nordnes

== Second round ==
Team 1	Score	Team 2
Aurskog	6–1	Skotterud
Baune	2–3	Haugar
Bryne	5–3	Klepp
Drafn	4–1	Stag
Flekkefjord	3–0	Ålgård
Gvarv	2–0	Pors
HamKam	3–1	Fremad Lillehammer
Jerv	3–6	Start
Kapp	0–5	Raufoss
Kvik (Trondheim)	1–1 (a.e.t.)	Verdal
Larvik Turn	1–4	Strømsgodset
Lisleby	2–1	Frigg
Lyn	11–0	Liv
Mjølner	3–1	Falken
Mjøndalen	3–2	Fram (Larvik)
Mo	1–2	Bodø/Glimt
Molde	3–0	Herd
Moss	5–1	Stabæk
Nidelv	0–1	Clausenengen
Odd	0–1	Heddal
Sagene	2–5 (a.e.t.)	Fredrikstad
Sandefjord BK	0–3	Vålerengen
Sarpsborg	0–1	Strømmen
Skarbøvik	1–2	Sogndal
Skeid	3–2	Selbak
Steinkjer	2–1	Nessegutten
Strinda	0–1	Rosenborg
Ulf	1–0	Os
Vard	2–1	Varegg
Vigør	4–1	Sørfjell
Aalesund	1–1 (a.e.t.)	Langevåg
Årstad	2–3	Brann
Replay
Langevåg	0–3	Aalesund
Verdal	2–2 (a.e.t.)	Kvik (Trondheim)
2nd replay
Kvik (Trondheim)	1–1 (a.e.t.)	Verdal
3rd replay
Verdal	2–1	Kvik (Trondheim)

== Third round ==
Team 1	Score	Team 2
30 June 1968
Brann	2–2 (a.e.t.)	Vigør
Ulf	0–0 (a.e.t.)	Vard
Heddal	1–4	Lyn
Start	0–1	Flekkefjord
Verdal	0–1	Aurskog
Fredrikstad	6–1	Gvarv
Aalesund	0–1	Molde
Haugar	0–1	Bryne
Clausenengen	0–4	HamKam
Vålerengen	5–1	Drafn
Sogndal	1–2	Mjøndalen
Strømmen	4–1	Skeid
Rosenborg	4–1	Mjølner
Strømsgodset	0–2	Moss
Raufoss	2–0	Lisleby
7 July 1968
Bodø/Glimt	1–2	Steinkjer
Replay: 4 July 1968
Vard	0–4	Ulf
Replay: 7 July 1968
Vigør	1–3	Brann

== Fourth round ==
Team 1	Score	Team 2
4 August 1968
Lyn	9–0	Flekkefjord
Moss	2–1	Raufoss
Aurskog	0–2	Fredrikstad
HamKam	0–7	Vålerengen
Molde	3–0	Bryne
Brann	2–1	Ulf
Mjøndalen	2–2 (a.e.t.)	Strømmen
Steinkjer	2–6	Rosenborg
Replay: 11 August 1968
Strømmen	1–4	Mjøndalen

== Quarter-finals ==
Team 1	Score	Team 2
1 September 1968
Fredrikstad	4–3	Molde
Rosenborg	4–2	Moss
Brann	1–4	Lyn
Vålerengen	1–2	Mjøndalen

== Semi-finals ==
Team 1	Score	Team 2
29 September 1968
Mjøndalen	2–1	Rosenborg
Lyn	4–1	Fredrikstad

== Final ==
27 October 1968

Lyn	3–0	Mjøndalen
Dybwad-Olsen 39'; J. Berg 81'; H. Berg 89'	Report

Ullevaal Stadion, Oslo
Attendance: 21,101
Referee: Henry Øberg (Hamar)

== Lyn's winning squad ==
- Svein Bjørn Olsen
- Jan Rodvang
- Helge Østvold
- Andreas Morisbak
- Knut Kolle
- Knut Berg
- Karl Johan Johannessen
- Jan Berg
- Harald Berg
- Ola Dybwad-Olsen
- Jon Palmer Austnes
- Alf H. Braathen
- Trygve Christophersen
- Sveinung Aarnseth
