= Roland Sandberg =

Swedish footballer (born 1946)

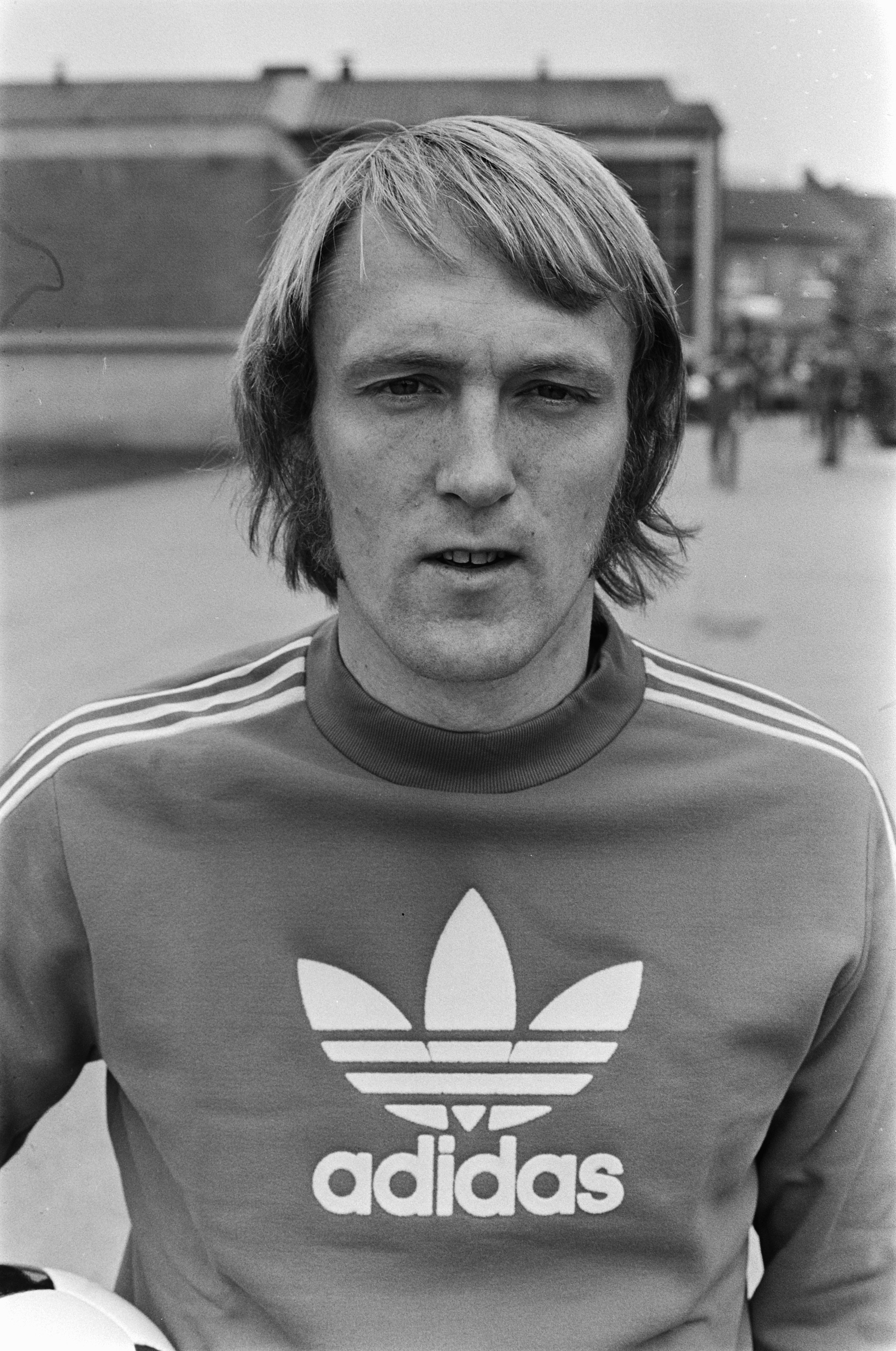
- Sandberg for Sweden during the 1974 FIFA World Cup

Personal information
- Full name: Ernst Roland Sandberg
- Date of birth: 16 December 1946 (age 79)
- Place of birth: Karlskrona, Sweden
- Height: 1.83 m (6 ft 0 in)
- Position: Striker

Youth career
- 1951–1960: Jämjö GoIF
- 1961–1964: Lyckeby GoIF

Senior career*
Years	Team	Apps	(Gls)
1965–1969	Kalmar FF	78	(32)
1970–1973	Åtvidabergs FF	71	(52)
1973–1977	1. FC Kaiserslautern	118	(60)
1979–1980	Kalmar FF	43	(12)
1981	BK Häcken	1	(0)
Total		311	(156)

International career
1969–1972	Sweden U21	6	(3)
1969–1976	Sweden	37	(15)
- * Club domestic league appearances and goals

Ernst Roland Sandberg (born 16 December 1946) is a Swedish former professional footballer who played as a striker. Starting off his career with Kalmar FF in 1966, he went on to represent Åtvidabergs FF, 1. FC Kaiserslautern, and BK Häcken before his retirement in 1981. A full international between 1969 and 1976, he won 37 caps and scored 15 goals for the Sweden national team. He was a part of the Sweden team that finished fifth at the 1974 FIFA World Cup.

== Club career ==
Born in Karlskrona, Sandberg began his footballing career with Jämjö GoIF and Lyckeby GoIF before signing with Kalmar FF in 1955. In 1970, he signed with Åtvidabergs FF with which he won two Allsvenskan titles, two Svenska Cupen titles, and was the Allsvenskan top scorer in both 1971 and 1972. In 1973, he signed with German Bundesliga outfit 1. FC Kaiserslautern, where he spent four years and contributed with 60 goals in 118 league games. After a career-threatening knee injury in 1976, he retired from professional football the following year. In 1979, after a new surgery, Sandberg made his footballing comeback and spent the last couple of seasons of his career with his former club Kalmar FF as well as a brief stint with BK Häcken in 1981 before he once again was forced to retire because of his knee problems.

== International career ==
=== Youth ===
Sandberg represented the Sweden U21 team a total of six times between 1969 and 1972, scoring 3 goals.

=== Senior ===
Sandberg made his full international debut for Sweden on 6 August 1969, replacing Leif Eriksson at halftime in a friendly 1–0 win against the Soviet Union. He scored his first international goal during the 1968–71 Nordic Football Championship in a 3–0 win against Norway on 8 August 1971. He represented Sweden at the 1974 FIFA World Cup, where he scored goals against Uruguay and West Germany as Sweden finished fifth. He won his 37th and final cap in a 1978 FIFA World Cup qualifier against Norway on 16 June 1976, being replaced by Jan Mattsson in the 37th minute after sustaining a serious knee injury.

== Career statistics ==
=== International ===
Appearances and goals by national team and year
National team	Year	Apps	Goals
Sweden	1969	1	0
Sweden	1970	0	0
Sweden	1971	3	1
Sweden	1972	6	2
Sweden	1973	7	6
Sweden	1974	11	3
Sweden	1975	5	2
Sweden	1976	4	1
Total		37	15

Scores and results list Sweden's goal tally first, score column indicates score after each Sandberg goal.

List of international goals scored by Roland Sandberg
No.	Date	Venue	Opponent	Score	Result	Competition	Ref.
1	8 August 1971	Malmö Stadium, Malmö, Sweden	Norway	1–0	3–0	1968–71 Nordic Football Championship	
2	29 June 1972	Malmö Stadium, Malmö, Sweden	Denmark	2–0	2–0	1972–77 Nordic Football Championship	
3	15 October 1972	Ullevi, Gothenburg, Sweden	Malta	5–0	7–0	1974 FIFA World Cup qualifier	
4	26 April 1973	Parken, Copenhagen, Denmark	Denmark	1–1	2–1	Friendly	
5	23 May 1973	Ullevi, Gothenburg, Sweden	Austria	1–0	3–2	1974 FIFA World Cup qualifier	
6	23 May 1973	Ullevi, Gothenburg, Sweden	Austria	3–1	3–2	1974 FIFA World Cup qualifier	
7	13 June 1973	Nepstadion, Budapest, Hungary	Hungary	2–1	3–3	1974 FIFA World Cup qualifier	
8	25 June 1973	Råsunda Stadium, Solna, Sweden	Brazil	1–0	1–0	Friendly	
9	27 November 1973	Parkstadion, Gelsenkirchen, West Germany	Austria	1–0	2–1	1974 FIFA World Cup qualifier	
10	3 June 1974	Parken, Copenhagen, Denmark	Denmark	1–0	2–0	1972–77 Nordic Football Championship	
11	23 June 1974	Rheinstadion, Düsseldorf, Germany	Uruguay	2–0	3–0	1974 FIFA World Cup	
12	30 June 1974	Rheinstadion, Düsseldorf, Germany	West Germany	2–2	2–4	1974 FIFA World Cup	
13	19 May 1975	Örjans Vall, Halmstad, Sweden	Algeria	2–0	4–0	Friendly	
14	13 August 1975	Ullevaal Stadium, Oslo, Norway	Yugoslavia	1–0	2–0	UEFA Euro 1976 qualifier	
15	11 May 1976	Ullevi, Gothenburg, Sweden	Denmark	1–0	1–2	Friendly	

== Honours ==
Åtvidabergs FF

- Allsvenskan: 1972, 1973

1. FC Kaiserslautern

- DFB-Pokal finalist: 1975–76

Individual

- Allsvenskan top scorer: 1971, 1972 (shared with Ralf Edström)
- Stor Grabb: 1973
