= Markussen =

Markussen is a surname. Notable people with the surname include:

- John Arne Markussen (born 1953), Norwegian newspaper editor
- Jørgen Markussen (born 1943), Danish footballer
- Niels Markussen (1934–2008), Danish sailor
- Nikolaj Markussen (born 1988), Danish handball player
- Rudy Markussen (born 1977), Danish boxer
- Toralv Kollin Markussen (1895–1973), Norwegian politician
