= Roar Johansen =

Roar Johansen is the name of:

- Roar Johansen (footballer) (1935–2015), Norwegian international footballer
- Roar Johansen (football coach) (born 1968), Norwegian football coach, main coach of Sarpsborg 08
