= Andreas Morisbak =

Norwegian footballer and manager (born 1940)

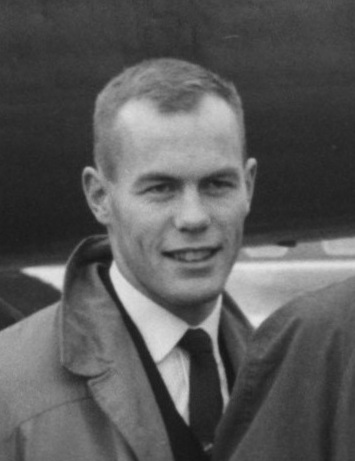
- Morisbak in 1964

Personal information
- Date of birth: 19 May 1940 (age 86)
- Place of birth: Vefsn Municipality, Norway

Senior career*
Years	Team	Apps	(Gls)
- Børsa
- Orkanger
1960–1971	Lyn	160	(3)

International career
1968–1969	Norway	3	(0)

Managerial career
- 1972–1974: Lyn
- 1983: Viking
- 1987–1988: Norway (assistant manager)
- * Club domestic league appearances and goals

Andreas Morisbak (born 19 May 1940) is a Norwegian former football player and manager. A defender and midfielder, he notable played for FK Lyn in the 1960s. He is the father of the footballer Sven Morisbak

== Career ==
Morisbak was born in Vefsn Municipality, and moved with his family to Børsa Municipality as a young child. He played for the clubs Børsa and Orkanger IF, before moving to Oslo where he played for FK Lyn from 1960 to 1971. He played 221 matches and scored five goals for Lyn. He captained the team that won the Double in 1968.

Morisbak was capped three times for Norway national team in 1968 and 1969.

He was the head coach of Lyn from 1972 to 1974 and had a short spell as head coach at Viking FK in 1983. From 1987 to 1988, when Tord Grip was manager of the Norway national football team, Morisbak was appointed assistant manager.

He has a degree from the Norwegian School of Sport Sciences, and has been employed by the Football Association of Norway, managing the national youth teams, as well as being in overall charge of youth development from 1975 to 2006.

== Honours ==
=== As player ===
FK Lyn

- Norwegian First Division: 1964, 1968; runner-up 1963, 1965
- Norwegian Football Cup: 1967, 1968; runner-up 1966, 1970
