= Karol Jokl =

Slovak footballer and manager (1945–1996)

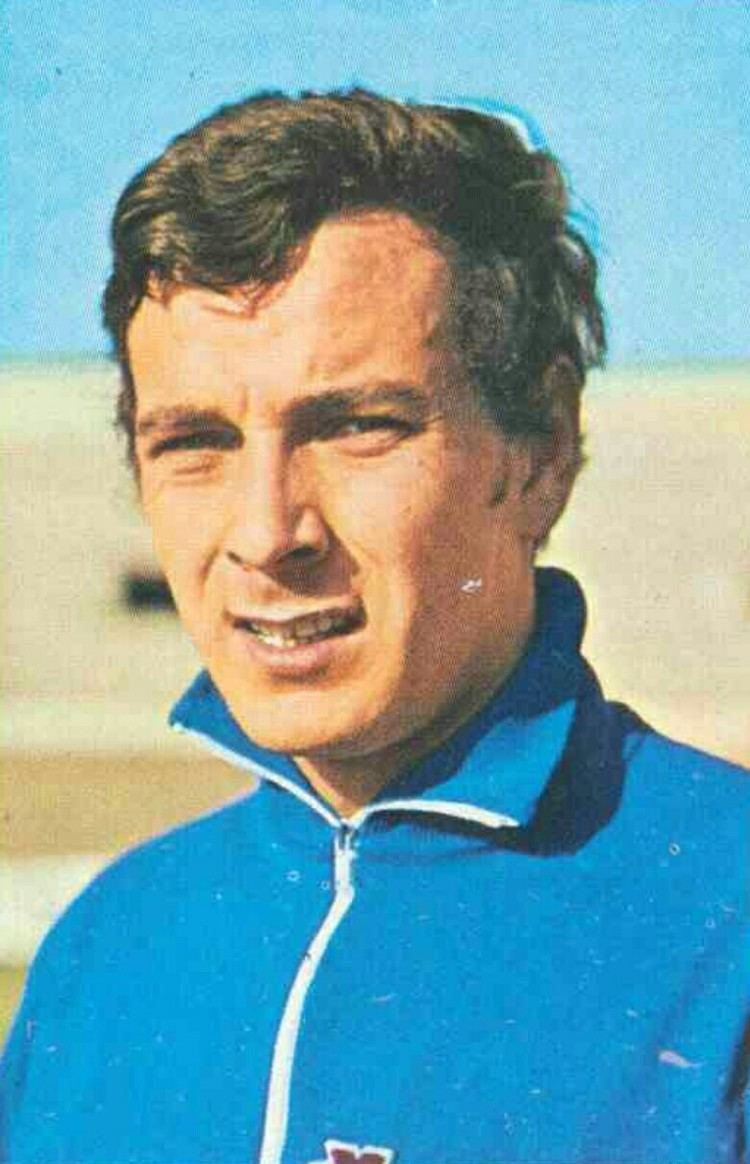
- Jokl at the 1970 FIFA World Cup

Personal information
- Date of birth: 29 August 1945
- Place of birth: Partizánske, Czechoslovakia
- Date of death: 28 October 1996 (aged 51)
- Place of death: Bratislava, Slovakia
- Positions: Midfielder; striker

Senior career*
Years	Team	Apps	(Gls)
1962–1963	Iskra Partizánske		
1963–1975	Slovan Bratislava	245	(69)
1975–1976	Baník Prievidza		

International career
1963–1972	Czechoslovakia	27	(11)

Managerial career
- Brezová pod Bradlom
- Senec
- St. Pölten
- 1994–1996: Slovan Bratislava (Assistant)
- * Club domestic league appearances and goals

Karol Jokl (29 August 1945 – 28 October 1996) was a Slovak football player and manager. He played for ŠK Slovan Bratislava and Czechoslovakia.

Between 1963 and 1975 he played in the Czechoslovak First League for ŠK Slovan Bratislava, scoring a total of 69 goals in 245 matches. Among his greatest honours is winning the 1968–69 European Cup Winners' Cup, as well as two league titles and two Czechoslovak Cups.

Jokl made his debut for the national team of Czechoslovakia at the age of 18, going on to score 11 goals in 27 matches for his country. He played in all three of Czechoslovakia's matches at the 1970 FIFA World Cup.

== Honours ==
Slovan Bratislava

- UEFA Cup Winners' Cup (1): 1968-69
- Czechoslovak First League (3): 1969-70, 1973-74, 1974-75
- Czechoslovak Cup (2): 1968, 1974
- Slovak Cup (3): 1970, 1972, 1974

Czechoslovakia

- 1970 FIFA World Cup: Group Stage
