= City Stadium Kikinda =

Stadium in Kikinda, Serbia

Kikinda Stadium
- Interactive map of Kikinda Stadium
- Full name: City Stadium Kikinda
- Location: Kikinda, Serbia
- Coordinates: 45.8382°N 20.4566°E
- Owner: FK Kikinda
- Operator: FK Kikinda
- Capacity: 7,500
- Type: UEFA Category 3 Stadium
- Surface: Grass

Construction
- Built: 1922
- Renovated: 2013

Gradski stadion (City stadium) in Kikinda, Serbia, is located right next to the sports center Jezero and Town Park. Its capacity is somewhere around 7,500 spectators. The stadium was built in 1922. During 2021 and 2022 there was news of the construction of a UEFA Category 3 football stadium.

== See also ==
- List of football stadiums in Serbia
- OFK Kikinda
