= Thor Spydevold =

Norwegian footballer (1944–2024)

Personal information
- Full name: Thor Otto Spydevold
- Date of birth: 15 August 1944
- Place of birth: Sarpsborg, German-occupied Norway
- Date of death: 1 July 2024 (aged 79)
- Place of death: Fredrikstad, Norway
- Position: Defender

Senior career*
Years	Team	Apps	(Gls)
- Greåker IF
- Sarpsborg FK
- Fredrikstad FK

International career
1968–1972	Norway	28	(1)
- * Club domestic league appearances and goals

Thor Otto Spydevold (15 August 1944 – 1 July 2024) was a Norwegian footballer who played as a defender. He won the 1966 Norwegian Football Cup with his club Fredrikstad FK, and played 28 matches for the Norway national team.

== Personal life and death ==
Born in Sarpsborg on 15 August 1944, Spydevold was a son of international footballer Bjørn Spydevold. He died in Fredrikstad on 1 July 2024, at the age of 79.

== Career ==
Spydevold played for the clubs Greåker IF, Sarpsborg FK and Fredrikstad FK, and won the Norwegian cup with Fredrikstad in 1966. He was capped 28 times for the Norway national team between 1968 and 1972, scoring one goal.
