= 1972 Allsvenskan =

48th season of Allsvenskan

Allsvenskan
- Season: 1972
- Champions: Åtvidabergs FF
- Relegated: Halmstads BK
- European Cup: Åtvidabergs FF
- UEFA Cup: AIK; Östers IF
- Top goalscorer: Ralf Edström, Åtvidabergs FF; Roland Sandberg, Åtvidabergs FF (16)
- Average attendance: 7,813

Statistics of Allsvenskan in season 1972.

== Overview ==
The league was contested by 12 teams, with Åtvidabergs FF winning the championship.

== League table ==
| Pos | Team | Pld | W | D | L | GF | GA | GD | Pts | Qualification or relegation |
|---|---|---|---|---|---|---|---|---|---|---|
| 1 | Åtvidabergs FF (C) | 22 | 15 | 3 | 4 | 65 | 22 | +43 | 33 | Qualification to European Cup first round |
| 2 | AIK | 22 | 11 | 10 | 1 | 41 | 24 | +17 | 32 | Qualification to UEFA Cup first round |
| 3 | Östers IF | 22 | 11 | 4 | 7 | 37 | 24 | +13 | 26 | Qualification to UEFA Cup first round |
| 4 | IFK Norrköping | 22 | 9 | 6 | 7 | 34 | 32 | +2 | 24 | |
| 5 | Örebro SK | 22 | 8 | 7 | 7 | 31 | 30 | +1 | 23 | |
| 6 | Malmö FF | 22 | 9 | 5 | 8 | 27 | 26 | +1 | 23 | Qualification to Cup Winners' Cup first round (Note: Malmö FF qualified for the European Cup Winners' Cup as Svenska Cupen champions 1972–73.) |
| 7 | Djurgårdens IF | 22 | 8 | 5 | 9 | 41 | 39 | +2 | 21 | |
| 8 | Landskrona BoIS | 22 | 6 | 9 | 7 | 29 | 29 | 0 | 21 | |
| 9 | Örgryte IS | 22 | 7 | 6 | 9 | 21 | 31 | −10 | 20 | |
| 10 | Hammarby IF | 22 | 5 | 7 | 10 | 30 | 47 | −17 | 17 | |
| 11 | GAIS | 22 | 4 | 4 | 14 | 32 | 56 | −24 | 12 | |
| 12 | Halmstads BK (R) | 22 | 2 | 8 | 12 | 14 | 42 | −28 | 12 | Relegation to Division 2 |

Rules for classification: 1) points; 2) goal difference; 3) number of goals scored.
(C) Champions; (R) Relegated

== Results ==
| Home \ Away | AIK | DIF | GAIS | HBK | HIF | IFK | BOIS | MFF | ÅFF | ÖSK | ÖIS | ÖIF |
|---|---|---|---|---|---|---|---|---|---|---|---|---|
| AIK | | 1–1 | 3–1 | 1–1 | 2–2 | 1–1 | 1–1 | 2–1 | 2–1 | 1–1 | 2–2 | 2–3 |
| Djurgårdens IF | 1–2 | | 4–2 | 2–1 | 1–1 | 1–1 | 1–1 | 1–0 | 0–3 | 3–4 | 3–1 | 3–3 |
| GAIS | 2–3 | 4–1 | | 2–2 | 2–1 | 1–4 | 2–5 | 0–0 | 0–3 | 0–2 | 2–0 | 0–4 |
| Halmstads BK | 0–2 | 0–2 | 2–0 | | 1–4 | 0–2 | 0–0 | 0–0 | 3–1 | 0–0 | 0–0 | 0–3 |
| Hammarby IF | 0–3 | 1–8 | 4–3 | 7–0 | | 0–0 | 1–1 | 1–2 | 1–4 | 0–3 | 2–2 | 0–0 |
| IFK Norrköping | 1–4 | 3–2 | 4–2 | 2–1 | 4–1 | | 1–1 | 2–1 | 1–2 | 1–2 | 1–1 | 3–0 |
| Landskrona BoIS | 2–2 | 2–0 | 2–4 | 3–0 | 0–0 | 0–0 | | 2–1 | 0–2 | 1–1 | 3–0 | 0–1 |
| Malmö FF | 1–1 | 2–1 | 1–1 | 5–2 | 1–2 | 3–0 | 1–0 | | 1–0 | 0–0 | 3–0 | 1–0 |
| Åtvidabergs FF | 0–0 | 4–2 | 5–2 | 4–0 | 6–1 | 4–1 | 5–1 | 4–1 | | 2–2 | 5–0 | 0–0 |
| Örebro SK | 0–1 | 1–2 | 1–1 | 2–1 | 0–1 | 1–2 | 2–1 | 1–2 | 1–6 | | 0–2 | 3–1 |
| Örgryte IS | 2–3 | 0–1 | 1–0 | 0–0 | 1–0 | 1–0 | 2–3 | 1–0 | 1–0 | 2–2 | | 2–0 |
| Östers IF | 0–2 | 2–1 | 4–1 | 0–0 | 3–0 | 3–0 | 2–0 | 5–0 | 2–4 | 0–2 | 1–0 | |

Legend: Blue = home team win; Yellow = draw; Red = away team win.

== Attendances ==
| # | Club | Average | Highest |
|---|---|---|---|
| 1 | AIK | 12,036 | 30,759 |
| 2 | Malmö FF | 10,755 | 21,598 |
| 3 | Hammarby IF | 8,562 | 22,699 |
| 4 | Östers IF | 8,326 | 18,760 |
| 5 | IFK Norrköping | 8,212 | 20,791 |
| 6 | GAIS | 7,563 | 15,257 |
| 7 | Örgryte IS | 7,362 | 18,869 |
| 8 | Djurgårdens IF | 6,901 | 20,141 |
| 9 | Halmstads BK | 6,763 | 9,242 |
| 10 | Landskrona BoIS | 6,184 | 13,234 |
| 11 | Örebro SK | 5,590 | 8,021 |
| 12 | Åtvidabergs FF | 5,218 | 10,533 |
