= List of football stadiums in Serbia =

The following is a list of football stadiums in Serbia, ranked in order of capacity, with the minimum capacity being 2,000. The capacities listed are seating capacities, which means the potential number of spectators the stadiums can accommodate in non-seated stands are not listed. Teams in bold are part of the 2026–27 Serbian SuperLiga.

== Current stadiums ==
#	Image	Stadium	Capacity	City	Home team	Opened	UEFA rank
1		Stadion Rajko Mitić	51,755	Belgrade	**FK Crvena Zvezda**; Serbia national football team	1963	4/4 stars
2		Partizan Stadium	29,775	Belgrade	**FK Partizan**	1951	3/4 stars
3		Stadion Čair	18,151	Niš	**FK Radnički Niš**	1963	
4		Gradski Stadion Smederevo	17,200	Smederevo	Smederevo 1924	1930	
5		Stadion Čika Dača	15,100	Kragujevac	**FK Radnički 1923**	1957	
6		Stadion Karađorđe	14,458	Novi Sad	**FK Vojvodina**	1924	
7		Stadion Karađorđev park	13,500	Zrenjanin	Proleter 2006	1953	
8		Subotica City Stadium	13,000	Subotica	Spartak	1936	
9		Radomir Antić Stadium	12,000	Užice	Sloboda	1946	
10		Omladinski Stadium	10,600	Belgrade	**OFK Beograd**	1957	
11		Mladost Stadium	10,331	Kruševac	Napredak	1976	
12		Novi Pazar City Stadium	10,000	Novi Pazar	**Novi Pazar**	2012	
13		Jagodina City Stadium	9,977	Jagodina	FK Jagodina	1958	
14		Zemun Stadium	9,588	Zemun	FK Zemun	1962	
15		Stadion Dragan Nikolić	8,816	Pirot	Radnički Pirot	NA	
16		Kraljevica Stadium	8,168	Zaječar	Timok 1919	2023	4/4 stars
17		Dubočica Stadium	8,136	Leskovac	GFK Dubočica	2023	4/4 stars
18		Lagator Stadium	8,030	Loznica	FK Loznica; **FK IMT**	2023	4/4 stars
19		Čačak Stadium	8,000	Čačak	Borac 1926	1958	
20		SRC MR Radoš Milovanović	8,000	Lučani	**Mladost Lučani**	NA	
21		Gradski stadion Šabac	8,000	Šabac	**Mačva**	NA	
22		City Stadium Kikinda	7,500	Kikinda	OFK Kikinda	1922	
23		Železnik Stadium	6,900	Belgrade	FK Železnik 1930	NA	
24		Detelinara Stadium	6,000	Novi Sad	RFK Novi Sad	1957	
25		Stadion Milan Sredanović	5,973	Kula	Hajduk 1912	1992	
26		Voždovac Stadium	5,175	Belgrade	Voždovac	2013	3/4 stars
27		FK Bor Stadium	5,000	Bor	Bor 1919	1957	
28		Bežanija Stadium	5,000	New Belgrade	Ušće Novi Beograd	2001	
29		Vršac City Stadium	5,000	Vršac	OFK Vršac	NA	
30		FK Obilić Stadium	4,508	Belgrade	FK Obilić	1950s	
31		Metalac Stadium	4,500	Gornji Milanovac	FK Metalac Gornji Milanovac	2012	
32		TSC Arena	4,500	Bačka Topola	TSC	2021	
33		Čukarički Stadion	4,070	Belgrade	**FK Čukarički**	1959	
34		Stadion Slavko Maletin Vava	4,000	Backa Palanka	FK Bačka Bačka Palanka	1947	
35		Dragan Džajić Stadium	4,000	Ub	FK Jedinstvo Ub; **FK Zemun**	1976	
36		King Peter I Stadium	3,919	Belgrade	FK Rad	NA	
37		Stadium Near Sombor Gate	3,700	Subotica	FK Bačka 1901	NA	
38		Javor Stadium	3,000	Ivanjica	FK Javor Ivanjica	NA	
39		Odžaci City Stadium	3,000	Odžaci	FK Tekstilac Odžaci	NA	
40		SRC Mladost Pančevo	2,300	Pančevo	**FK Železničar Pančevo**	1981	
41		Surdulica City Stadium	3,312	Surdulica	**FK Radnik Surdulica**	1955	
42		Serbian FA Sports Center	3,000	Stara Pazova	Serbia national under-21 football team Serbia women's national football team	2011	
43		Kolubara Stadium	2,500	Lazarevac	FK Kolubara	1968	
44		Yumco Stadium	2,500	Vranje	FK SU Dinamo Jug	NA	
45		Stadium FK ŽAK	2,000	Kikinda	FK ŽAK Kikinda	NA	

== Stadiums under construction ==
Stadium	Capacity	City	Home team	Source
National stadium	52,000	Belgrade	Serbia national football team	
Grafičar Stadium	3,500	Belgrade	Grafičar	

== Proposed stadiums ==
Stadium	Capacity	City	Home team	Source
Kragujevac New Stadium	12,000	Kragujevac	Radnički 1923	
Subotica New Stadium	8,000	Subotica	Spartak Subotica	
Kraljevo New Stadium	8,000	Kraljevo	Sloga Kraljevo	
Vranje New Stadium	8,000	Vranje	Dinamo Vranje	
FK Bor Stadium (reconstruction)	4,550	Bor	FK Bor	
Pančevo New Stadium	Unknown	Pančevo	Železničar	
Zrenjanin New Stadium	Unknown	Zrenjanin	Radnički Zrenjanin	
Čukarički New Stadium	Unknown	Belgrade	Čukarički	

== See also ==
- Football in Serbia
- List of European stadiums by capacity
- List of stadiums in Europe
- List of association football stadiums by capacity
- List of association football stadiums by country
- List of sports venues by capacity
- List of stadiums by capacity
- Lists of stadiums
