= Bygdø Monolitten IL =

Norwegian sports club

Monolitten IL
- (Monolitten's logo before 2020)
- Full name: Monolitten Idrettslag
- Nickname: Monolitten
- Founded: 29 May 1914; 111 years ago
- Ground: Ferd stadion, Oslo
- Chairman: Henrik Henriksen
- League: Fourth Division
Home colours

Monolitten Idrettslag (previously Bygdø Monolitten Idrettslag) is a Norwegian sports club from Bygdøy and Skøyen, Frogner, Oslo. It has sections for association football, team handball, floorball and badminton.

== History ==
Old logo of Bygdø BK.

The club was founded on 29 May 1914 under the name Djerv. The name was changed to Skøien BK in 1915 and to Skøien IF as the club started to participate in non-ball games. However the name was changed to Bygdø BK, "Bygdø Ball Club", in 1927. The club changed its name to just "Monolitten IL" in 2020 due to the merge of Frognerparken IL and Monolitten IL.

The club added Nordic skiing in 1923, track and field in 1929 and bandy in 1934. All these were later abolished. The club got its own sports field with a gravel surface in 1934, and a grass pitch in 1947. The grass pitch was changed to artificial turf in 2007, the same year that the name Ferd Stadion was inaugurated. The club colors are red and blue.

On 9 November 1998 another club named Monolitten IL was founded. Among others, it offered the sport of floorball. On 12 April 2005 it was merged with Bygdø BK under the name Bygdø Monolitten IL until 2020. Monolitten is the Norwegian name for "The Monolith" in Vigeland Sculpture Park.

== Floorball ==
Since the introduction of floorball, the club has seen success in this sport. The men's floorball team was promoted from the Fourth Division in 2006–07 to playing the Second Division in 2008–09. In 2010–11 it will play in the First Division. Also in 2010–11, the women's floorball team will play in the Premier League, the first team in the club to achieve such a feat.

== Football ==
The men's football team currently plays in the Fourth Division, the fifth tier of Norwegian football, after being relegated from the Third Division in 2010. The relegation ended a stint in the Third Division in 2004. Well-known players include Sven Morisbak, Rune Danielsen and Per Olav Sætre.
