= Jämjö =

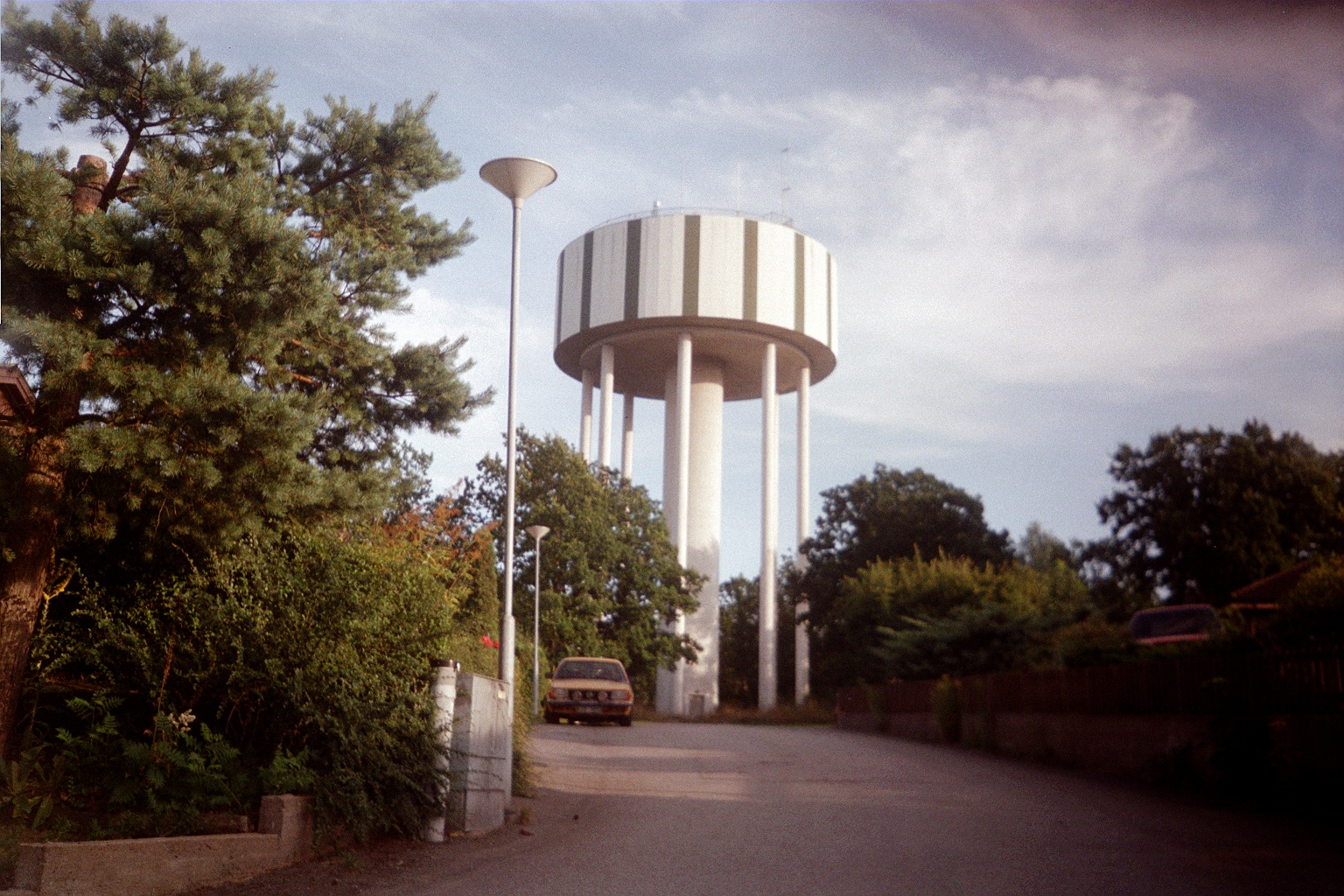
- Watertower in Jämjö

- Location within Blekinge Location within Sweden
- Coordinates: 56°11′N 15°51′E
- Country: Sweden
- Province: Blekinge
- County: Blekinge County
- Municipality: Karlskrona Municipality

Area
  - Total: 2.52 km^{2} (0.97 sq mi)

Population (31 December 2010)
  - Total: 2,578
  - Density: 1,022/km^{2} (2,650/sq mi)
- Time zone: UTC+1 (CET)
  - Summer (DST): UTC+2 (CEST)

Jämjö is a locality situated in Karlskrona Municipality, Blekinge County, Sweden with 2,578 inhabitants in 2010.

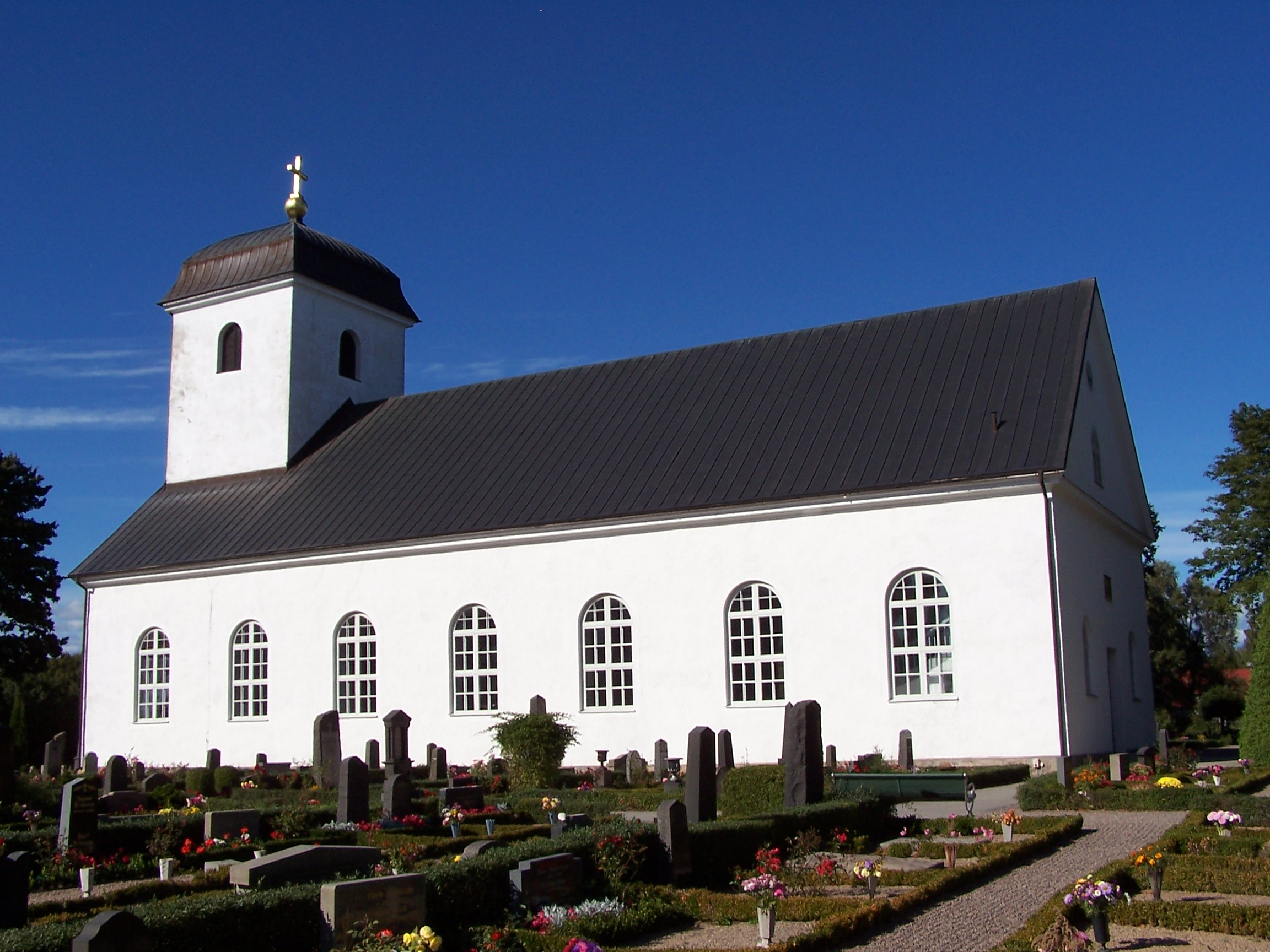
Jämjö church

== Sports ==
The following sports clubs are located in Jämjö:

- Jämjö GoIF
