= Sven Morisbak =

Norwegian footballer (born 1972)

Personal information
- Full name: Sven Godal Morisbak
- Date of birth: 8 April 1972 (age 54)
- Height: 1.82 m (6 ft 0 in)
- Position: Midfielder

Youth career
- Hosletoppen
- Hosle
- Lyn

Senior career*
Years	Team	Apps	(Gls)
1994–1997	Lyn	41	(0)
1994	→ Stjørdals-Blink (loan)		
1998–1999	Ullern		
- Bygdø Monolitten
- * Club domestic league appearances and goals

Sven Morisbak (born 8 April 1972) is a retired Norwegian football midfielder.

He is a son of Andreas Morisbak and grew up at Hosle in Bærum. In 1990 he won the Norwegian U20 Cup with Lyn, together with players like Axel Kolle, Jan Derek Sørensen, Ola Dybwad-Olsen, Jr., Thomas Wæhler, Glenn Hartmann and Henrik Rønnevig. He made his senior debut for Lyn in 1994, and got 11 Eliteserien games in 1997. He was also loaned out to Stjørdals-Blink. In 1998 he joined second-tier team Ullern IF, later fourth-tier team Bygdø Monolitten IL.
