= Kees Aarts (footballer) =

Dutch footballer

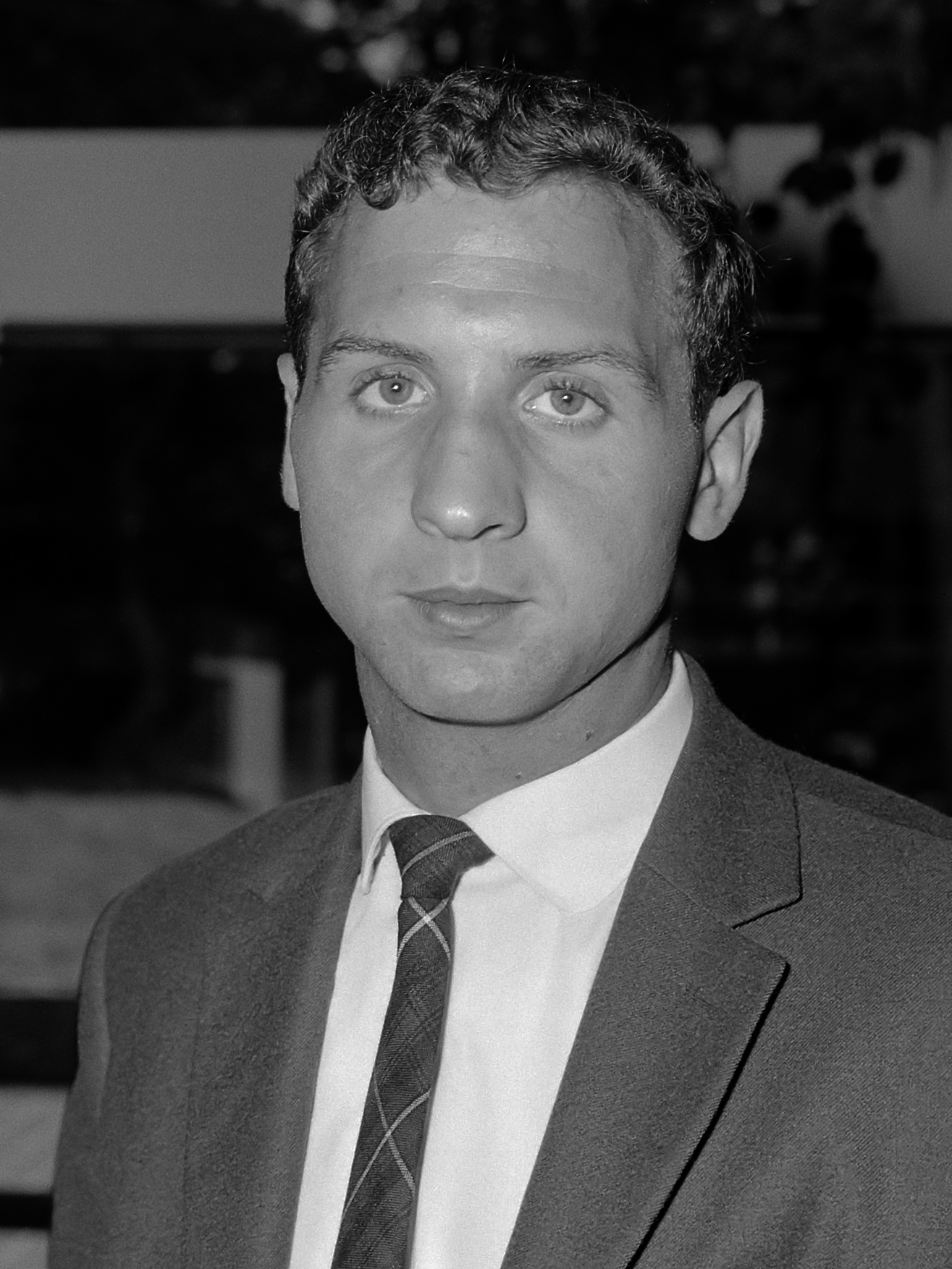

Personal information
- Full name: Kees Adrianus Ludovicus Aarts
- Date of birth: 30 November 1941
- Place of birth: Baarle-Nassau, the Netherlands
- Date of death: 26 November 2008 (aged 66)
- Place of death: The Hague, the Netherlands
- Height: 5 ft 9 in (1.75 m)
- Position: Forward

Senior career*
Years	Team	Apps	(Gls)
1960–1963	Willem II	40	(14)
1963–1969	ADO Den Haag	164	(63)
1967	→ Golden Gate Gales (loan)	9	(2)
1969–1970	Go Ahead Eagles	15	(3)
Total		228	(82)

International career
1966	Netherlands	1	(0)
- * Club domestic league appearances and goals

Kees Adrianus Ludovicus Aarts (30 November 1941 – 26 November 2008) was a Dutch soccer player who played in the United Soccer Association. He represented the Netherlands at international level once in 1966.

== Career statistics ==
=== Club ===
Club	Season	League			Cup		Other		Total	
Club	Season	Division	Apps	Goals	Apps	Goals	Apps	Goals	Apps	Goals
Golden Gate Gales	1967	USA	9	2	0	0	0	0	9	2
Career total			9	2	0	0	0	0	9	2
