= Jim Fraser (Scottish footballer) =

Scottish footballer

Personal information
- Place of birth: Scotland
- Position: Centre half

Youth career
- Mugiemoss

Senior career*
| Years | Team | Apps | (Gls) |
| 1957–1962 | Arbroath | 195 | (0) |
| 1962–1969 | Clyde | 181 | (0) |
| 1969–1971 | Dundee | 4 | (0) |
- Arbroath S.C.
| Total | | 380 | (0) |
- * Club domestic league appearances and goals

James Fraser is a Scottish former footballer who played as a Centre half.

Fraser began his career with Arbroath, and made over 200 appearances for the Red Lichties before joining Clyde. He spent seven years with the Shawfield and gained a reputation for being a hard man in the defence; he was a member of the side that finished 3rd in the 1966–67 Scottish Division One table, their highest-ever placing. Fraser left Clyde in 1969 to join Dundee. He played under manager John Prentice at each of his three clubs.

He should not be confused with another Jim Fraser who played during the same era and in the same position, mainly for Dunfermline Athletic.
