= FK Bor Stadium =

Multi-purpose stadium in Bor, Serbia

- Stadion kraj Pirita
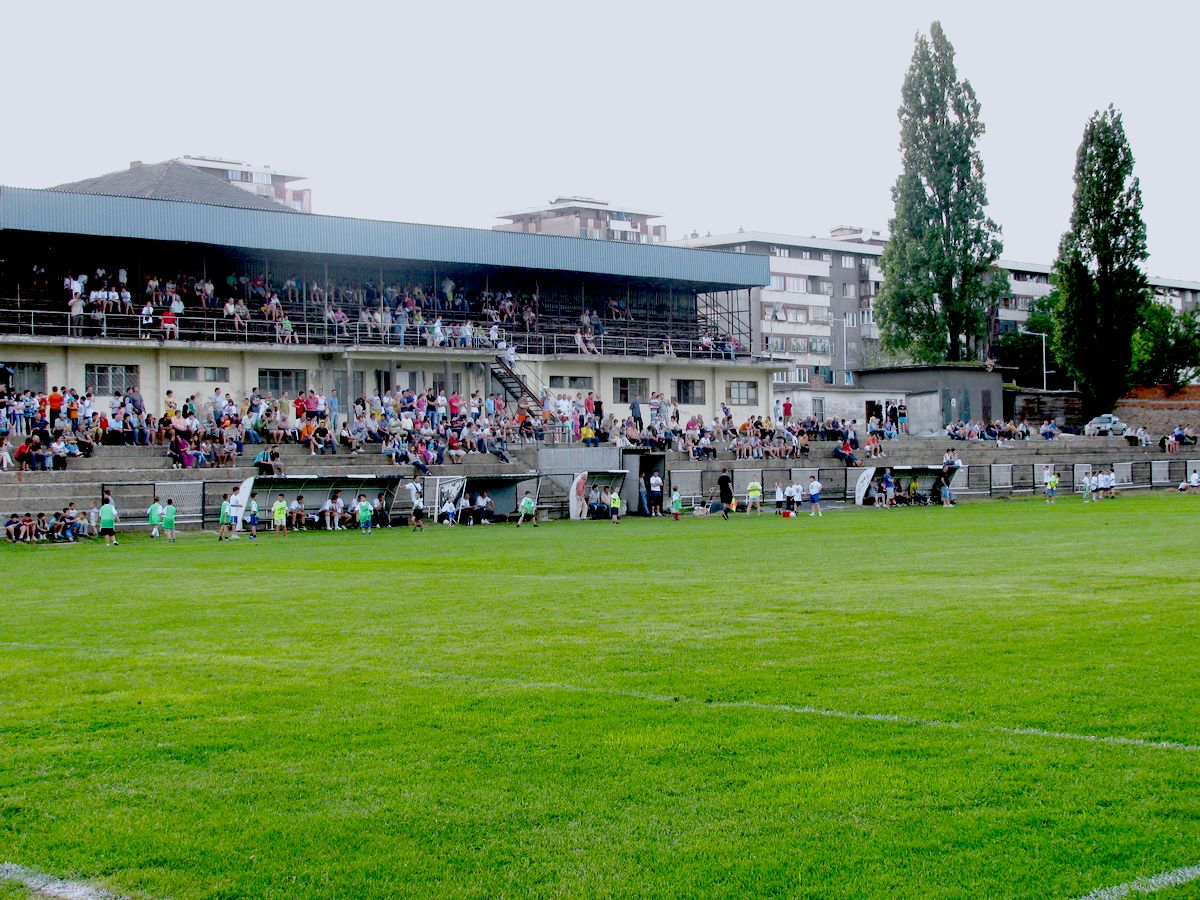
- Interactive map of FK Bor Stadium
- Address: Nikole Pašića 11, 19210 Bor, Serbia.
- Location: Bor, Serbia
- Coordinates: 44°04′19.00″N 22°06′08.9″E
- Owner: City of Bor
- Capacity: 3,500
- Surface: Grass

Construction
- Built: 1956
- Opened: 1957

Tenants
- FK Bor (Association football) (1956–present); FK Krivelj (Association football) (2018–2019)

FK Bor Stadium, commonly known as Stadion kraj Pirita, is a multi-purpose stadium in Bor, Serbia. The current capacity of the stadium is 3,500. FK Bor stadium was built in 1956. First match was played in April 1957. between local rivals FK Bor and Metalac. In that period stadium was one of the most modern stadiums in former Yugoslavia.

In 2014. FK Bor in a cooperation with Football Association of Serbia announce plans to build new stadium on the same place with capacity of 5000, where Serbia national football team will also play their home matches. However, this plan never materialized.

Today, Public institution "Sports Center Bor" and the City of Bor are taking care of this stadium from 2019. This decision was made after four months of talks with FK Bor management and parents of kids from the football academy. It is still impossible to complete reconstruction of whole stadium, due to property rights issues.

== Bor New Stadium ==
The project of the new football stadium in Bor, which is soon planned to be built on the site of the existing stadium of the Football Club Bor, was presented. The Bor stadium project brings numerous innovations in this area and will be built in accordance with the highest standards. Behind the project stands the renowned house DBA Architects, known for projects that have won awards and recognitions throughout Europe. As for the stadium itself, it will have a capacity of 4550 spectators, with the most modern lighting - UEFA Lighting guide, stitch hybrid surface with automatic watering and field heating system.

What is particularly impressive is the four-star hotel envisioned next to the north stand of the stadium. It will have a capacity of 35 rooms, half of which will have a view of the field as a special curiosity and attraction. It is a specialized hotel that will be able to accommodate teams and staff during competition days, but also to operate in the market and receive guests throughout the year. The main restaurant on the west stand will also be open when there are no matches. Another attractive novelty comes from the side of the south stand. The construction of a handball court on the roof of the parking garage is planned there, while there will be a basketball court at the level of the court that will be able to be used as a TV compound during games if there is a need for it. The project envisages the first stadium in Serbia based on sustainable principles and green energy. The stadium is energy self-sustainable by using heat pumps, solar panels, and a rainwater reuse system for watering the field. There are green roofs with an arrangement of openings and the use of quality materials. The construction of the stadium is planned to start in 2026 and to be completely completed within two years. The stadium will be able to follow the ambitions of the Bor club both for the appearance in the Super League and on the European stage. Bor will also position itself to host numerous domestic and international matches and competitions.

== See also ==
- List of football stadiums in Serbia
- FK Bor
