= Roar Johansen (footballer) =

Norwegian footballer and manager (1935–2015)

Personal information
- Full name: Roar Johansen
- Date of birth: 8 July 1935
- Place of birth: Fredrikstad, Norway
- Date of death: 23 October 2015 (aged 80)
- Place of death: Fredrikstad, Norway
- Position: Defender

Senior career*
Years	Team	Apps	(Gls)
1952–1967	Fredrikstad	190	(5)

International career
1953	Norway U19	1	(0)
1955–1957	Norway U21	9	(0)
1956–1960	Norway B	3	(0)
1958–1967	Norway	61	(0)
- * Club domestic league appearances and goals

Roar Johansen (8 July 1935 – 23 October 2015) was a Norwegian footballer and manager.

As a defender for Fredrikstad he helped win the league title in 1956–57, 1959–60 and 1960–61, and the cup title in 1957, 1961 and 1966. In total he played for Fredrikstad from 1952 to 1967.

Johansen was also an important player for the Norwegian national team. He was capped 61 times; including a Norwegian record of 54 consecutive international matches between 18 September 1960 and 24 September 1967 (which was also his last international). He played in Norway's shock 3–0 win against Yugoslavia in 1965.

He went on to coach Fredrikstad. He died on 23 October 2015 at 80 years old.
