= Karl Johan Johannessen =

Norwegian footballer (1943–2025)

Personal information
- Date of birth: 28 April 1943
- Place of birth: Ålesund, German-occupied Norway
- Date of death: 6 September 2025 (aged 82)
- Place of death: Ålesund, Norway
- Positions: Midfielder; forward

Senior career*
Years	Team	Apps	(Gls)
1961–1967	Herd		
1967–1969	Lyn	39	(8)
1970	Herd		
1971	Aalesund		
1972–1973	Skarbøvik		
1974–1975	Aalesund		
1976	Molde	19	(0)

International career
1968	Norway	1	(0)
- * Club domestic league appearances and goals

Karl Johan "Kallen" Johannessen (28 April 1943 – 6 September 2025) was a Norwegian footballer. In his younger years, Johannessen played as a forward. Later in his career, he played mostly in midfield.

== Biography ==
Johannessen played for SK Herd before transferring to Lyn in the summer of 1967. He had a good scoring rate in 1967, and also notably scored four goals in six games in the 1968–69 European Cup Winners' Cup. He also got the chance to represent Norway once.

In 1970 he returned to SK Herd, then he went on to Aalesunds FK in 1971, Skarbøvik IF in 1972, Aalesund again in 1974, and Molde FK in 1976.

Johannessen died in Ålesund on 6 September 2025, at the age of 82.
