= Rolf Andersson =

Swedish footballer

Personal information
- Full name: Rolf Andersson
- Date of birth: 5 October 1929
- Date of death: 18 April 1997 (aged 67)
- Position: Forward

Senior career*
Years	Team	Apps	(Gls)
1951–1954	Malmö FF	30	(12)

International career
1951	Sweden	1	(0)
- * Club domestic league appearances and goals

Rolf Andersson (5 October 1929 – 18 April 1997) was a Swedish footballer who played as a forward.
