= Jan Aas =

Norwegian footballer (1944-2016)

Personal information
- Date of birth: January 14, 1944
- Place of birth: Fredrikstad, Norway
- Date of death: May 30, 2016 (aged 72)

Jan Aas (14 January 1944 – 30 May 2016) was a Norwegian footballer who played as a left-winger for Fredrikstad FK and Sarpsborg FK, and was also capped three times for Norway.

Aas made his first-team debut for Fredrikstad as a 17-year-old in 1961, and played six matches in FFK's title-winning 1960–61 season, and also won the Norwegian Cup the same year. He made his international debut for Norway in a friendly against Finland on 26 August 1962. He left Fredrikstad in 1969 and played briefly for Swedish team Bengtsfors IF, before returning to Norwegian football when he joined Sarpsborg in 1971. At Sarpsborg, Aas won two more international caps.

After three seasons with Sarpsborg, Aas returned to Fredrikstad ahead of the 1974 season, and helped FFK return to the top flight after the club's first-ever relegation the year before. He played for Fredrikstad until his retirement from the game in 1978. He returned to FFK as coach in 1984, but was sacked midway through the season following a string of poor results.

Aas died on 30 May 2016, aged 72.
