= Hans Edgar Paulsen =

Norwegian footballer (born 1946)

Personal information
- Date of birth: 23 April 1946 (age 80)

International career
| Years | Team | Apps | (Gls) |
| 1970–1973 | Norway | 4 | (2) |

Hans Edgar Paulsen (born 23 April 1946) is a Norwegian footballer. He played in four matches for the Norway national football team from 1970 to 1973.
