= Karsten Lund =

Danish footballer (1943–2015)

Karsten Lund (12 November 1943 – 27 May 2015) is a Danish former football (soccer) player, who played 310 games and scored 140 goals for Vejle Boldklub. He played four games and scored two goals for the Denmark national football team.
