= Jämjö GoIF =

Swedish football club

- Full name: Jämjö Gymnastik och Idrottsförening
- Founded: 1929
- Ground: Jämjö Idrottsplats; Jämjö; Sweden
- League: Division 4 Blekinge
- 2012: 1st
Home colours	Away colours

Jämjö GoIF is a Swedish football club located in Jämjö.

== Background ==
Jämjö GoIF currently plays in Division 4 Blekinge which is the sixth tier of Swedish football. They play their home matches at Jämjö IP.

The club is affiliated to Blekinge Fotbollförbund. Jämjö GoIF have competed in the Svenska Cupen on 10 occasions.

Uppdaterades 2018

== Season to season ==
Season	Level	Division	Section	Position	Movements
2006*	Tier 6	Division 4	Blekinge	1st	Promoted
2007	Tier 5	Division 3	Sydöstra Götaland	11th	Relegated
2008	Tier 6	Division 4	Blekinge	4th	
2009	Tier 6	Division 4	Blekinge	4th	
2010	Tier 6	Division 4	Blekinge	8th	
2011	Tier 6	Division 4	Blekinge	8th	
2012	Tier 6	Division 4	Blekinge	1st	Promoted
2013	Tier 5	Division 3	Sydöstra Götaland	11th	Relegated
2014	Tier 6	Division 4	Blekinge	6th	
2015	Tier 6	Division 4	Blekinge	8th	
2016	Tier 6	Division 4	Blekinge	4th	
2017	Tier 6	Division 4	Blekinge	7th	
2018	Tier 6	Division 4	Blekinge	11th	Relegated
2019	Tier 7	Division 5	Blekinge	8th	
2020	Tier 7	Division 5	Blekinge	1st	Promoted

* League restructuring in 2006 resulted in a new division being created at Tier 3 and subsequent divisions dropping a level. |}
