= Peter Blusch =

German footballer

Personal information
- Date of birth: 11 June 1942 (age 84)
- Height: 1.80 m (5 ft 11 in)
- Position: Defender

Senior career*
Years	Team	Apps	(Gls)
1963–1964	Sportfreunde Siegen	24	(1)
1964–1968	Eintracht Frankfurt	110	(5)
1968–1970	1. FC Köln	44	(3)
1970–1971	1. FC Kaiserslautern	20	(2)

Managerial career
- 1975–1976: FC Biel-Bienne
- 1980–1982: FC Vaduz
- * Club domestic league appearances and goals

Peter Blusch (born 11 June 1942 as Peter Bluskowicz) is a former German footballer.

Blusch began his career at Sportfreunde Siegen, before beginning professionally in 1964 for Eintracht Frankfurt. He made it into the first team in Frankfurt and played 110 games altogether. In 1968, he moved to 1. FC Köln, where he played 44 games during a two-year spell. In 1970, Kaiserslautern beckoned, and he played twenty games there. His playing career ended in 1971.

During his whole career, Blusch scored ten goals and did a dance after each one. He also played eight games in the UEFA Cup with 1. FC Köln.
