= Vasilios Botinos =

Greek footballer (1944–2022)

Personal information
- Date of birth: 19 October 1944
- Place of birth: Volos, Greece
- Date of death: 16 February 2022 (aged 77)
- Place of death: Nikaia, Greece
- Height: 1.80 m (5 ft 11 in)
- Position: Winger

Senior career*
Years	Team	Apps	(Gls)
1958–1964	Olympiacos Volos	58	(33)
1964–1972	Olympiacos	134	(42)
1972–1973	Panegialios		
1973–1974	Panionios	7	(2)

International career
1967–1969	Greece	12	(3)
- * Club domestic league appearances and goals

Vasilios Botinos (Greek: Βασίλειος Μποτίνος; 19 October 1944 – 16 February 2022) was a Greek footballer who played as a winger for Olympiacos as well as the Greece national team.

== Career ==
Born in Volos, Botinos began playing football as a winger with Olympiacos Volos in 1958, until he joined Alpha Ethniki side Olympiacos F.C. in July 1964. He spent most of his career with Olympiacos, where he suffered a serious leg injury in 1969. Botinos left Olympiacos for Panegialios F.C. in 1972, and finished his career in the Alpha Ethniki with Panionios F.C., retiring at age 29 in 1974.

Botinos made twelve appearances and scored three goals for the Greece national team from 1967 to 1969, scoring two goals in a 4–1 1970 FIFA World Cup qualifying victory against Switzerland on 15 October 1969.

== Honours ==
Olympiacos

- Panhellenic Championship: 1966 και 1967
- Greek Cup: 1964, 1968 και 1971

== Personal life ==
Botinos died from COVID-19 in Nikaia, on 16 February 2022, at the age of 77.
