= Sten Pålsson =

Swedish footballer

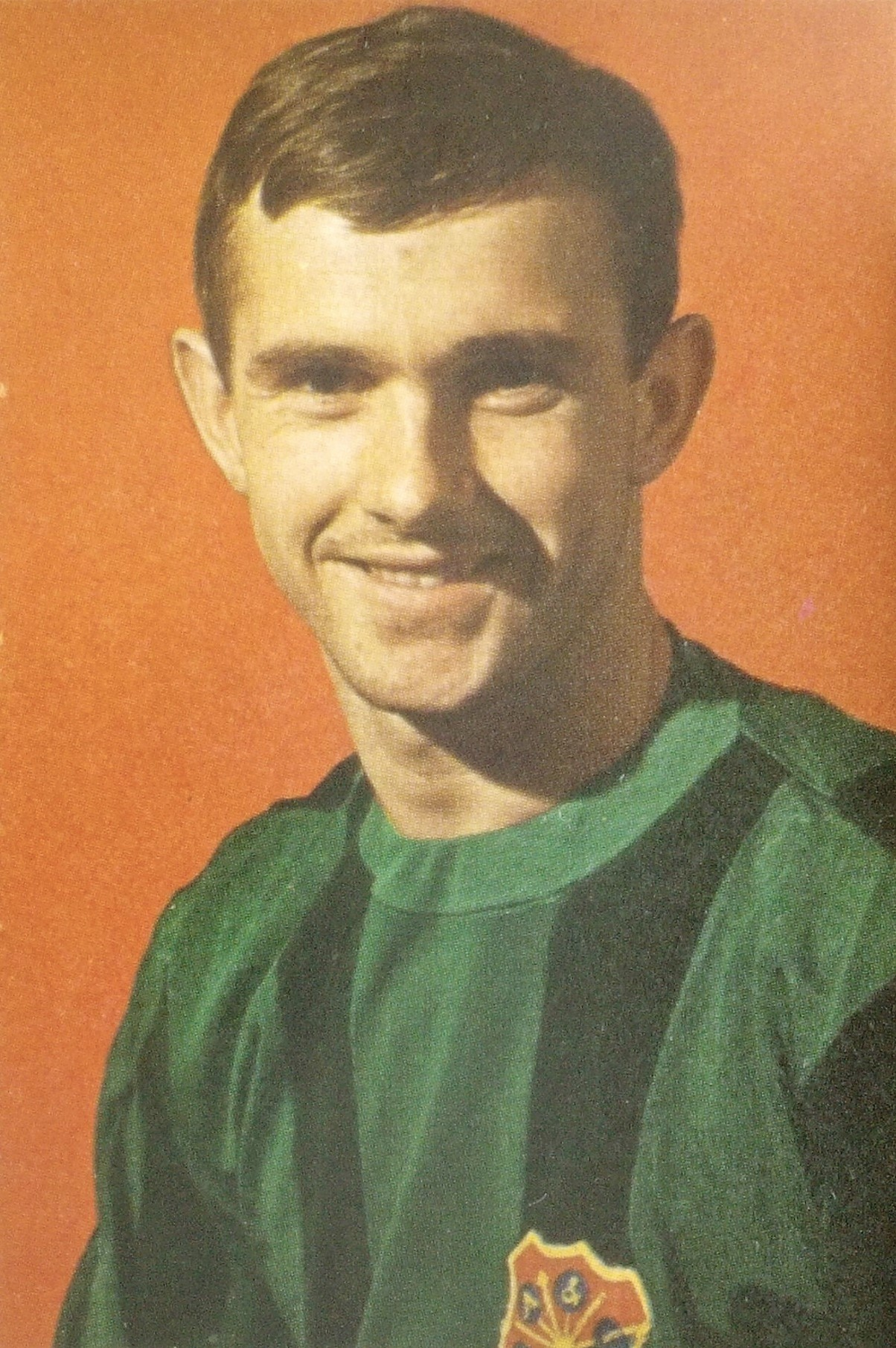
- Pålsson in 1968

Personal information
- Date of birth: 4 December 1945 (age 80)
- Place of birth: Sweden
- Position: Striker

Senior career*
Years	Team	Apps	(Gls)
1968–1981	GAIS	297	(81)

International career
196–1974	Sweden	19	(5)
- * Club domestic league appearances and goals

Sten Pålsson (born 4 December 1945) is a Swedish footballer who played as a forward.

== Career ==
Pålsson began his playing career in Stångenäs AIS, after that he played for Kungshamns IF. In January 1968 he began to play with GAIS and played for the club in Allsvenskan and the second division until 1981. He played 149 matches and scored 40 goals in allsvenskan and, scored 41 goals in 145 division 2 appearances.

Pålsson made 19 appearances as a striker for the Sweden men's national football team and was a part of the squad in the 1970 FIFA World Cup.
