= Alberto Carelli =

Italian footballer (born 1944)

Personal information
- Date of birth: 26 July 1944 (age 82)
- Place of birth: Locate di Triulzi, Italy
- Position: Forward

Senior career*
Years	Team	Apps	(Gls)
1961–1964	Fanfulla		
1964–1970	Torino		
1966	→ Catania (loan)		
1970–1971	Varese		
1971–1972	Mantova		
1972–1974	Atalanta		
1974–1975	Parma		
- * Club domestic league appearances and goals

Alberto Carelli (born 26 July 1944) is a retired Italian football striker.
