= Jan Berg (footballer, born 1943) =

Norwegian footballer (1943-2005)

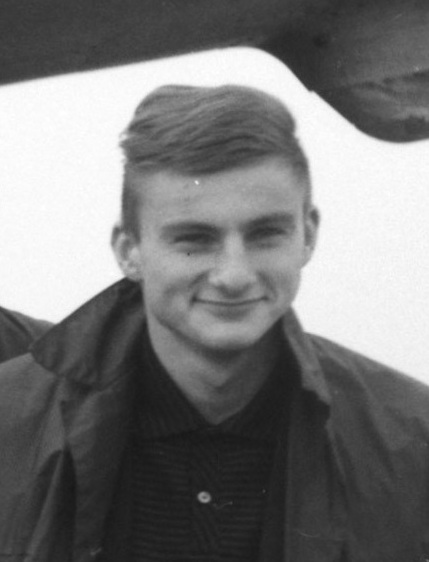

Personal information
- Full name: Jan "Julle" Berg
- Date of birth: 11 May 1943
- Place of birth: Oslo, Norway
- Date of death: 14 August 2005 (aged 62)
- Place of death: Bærum, Norway
- Position: Midfielder

Senior career*
Years	Team	Apps	(Gls)
1960–1971	Lyn	139	(38)
- * Club domestic league appearances and goals

Jan "Julle" Berg (11 May 1943 – 14 August 2005) was a Norwegian footballer.

He played his entire career for his hometown team FK Lyn, and won the Norwegian First Division in 1964 and 1968 as well as the Norwegian Football Cup in 1967 and 1968.

He played 190 matches and scored 57 goals for Lyn from 1960 to 1971, including six matches in 1968–69 European Cup Winners' Cup where Lyn reached the quarter-final.

After his retirement, Berg was the head coach of Lyn from 1977 to 1978. Jan Berg is the brother of Axel Berg
