= Svein Bredo Østlien =

Norwegian footballer (born 1943)

Personal information
- Date of birth: 2 July 1943 (age 83)
- Position: Midfielder

Senior career*
Years	Team	Apps	(Gls)
1963–1964	Raufoss		
1965–1967	Lyn	41	(4)
1968–1970	Raufoss		
1971	Lyn	9	(1)
1972–1973	Raufoss		

International career
1961	Norway U19	2	(1)
1963–1966	Norway U21	5	(0)
1964–1968	Norway	6	(0)
- * Club domestic league appearances and goals

Svein Bredo Østlien (born 2 July 1943) is a retired Norwegian football midfielder. He spent most of his career in Raufoss, but also four season in Lyn. Østlien also represented Norway as an U19, U21 and senior international.
