= Sveinung Aarnseth =

Norwegian footballer and dentist (1933–2019)

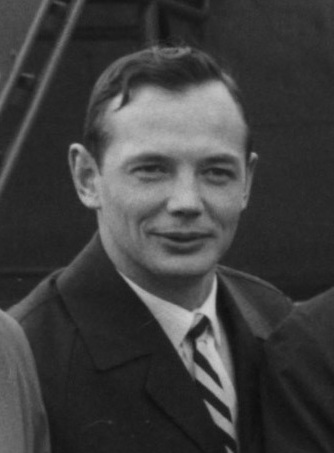
Sveinung Aarnseth in 1964

Sveinung Aarnseth (15 May 1933 – 9 March 2019) was a Norwegian footballer and dentist. Aarnseth began his football career as a forward, but was later converted to central defender. He most notably played for SFK Lyn from 1960 to 1968, where he played a total of 113 matches, scoring 18 goals in the top division of the Norwegian league. As a member of Lyn, he won the Norwegian league twice (1964 and 1968), and the Norwegian Cup twice (1967 and 1968). He also won five international caps for Norway, making his debut against Sweden in September 1964.

Aarnseth also played briefly for VVV-Venlo in 1957, playing seven games in the Eredivisie and is believed to be the first-ever Norwegian in the top level of Dutch football, while simultaneously finishing his education in dentistry. He worked 40 years as a dentist at Lysaker and also resided in Bærum.
