= Steen Rømer Larsen =

Danish footballer (born 1949)

Personal information
- Date of birth: 24 February 1949 (age 77)
- Place of birth: Denmark
- Position: Striker

Senior career*
Years	Team	Apps	(Gls)
–1969	B 1903		
1969–1970	Nantes	9	(0)
1970–19XX	Union St. Gilloise		

International career
1968–1969	Denmark	8	(4)
- * Club domestic league appearances and goals

Steen Rømer Larsen (born 24 February 1949) is a Danish former footballer who played as a striker.

He was the top goalscorer of the 1969 Danish football championship, where he was part of the team who won the championship. He then moved abroad to play professionally for FC Nantes and Union St. Gilloise in France and Belgium.

Steen Rømer played eight games and scored four goals for the Denmark national football team. Two of the goals was scored in his debut against Norway. Additionally he had 8 caps for various youth national teams.
