= Jørgen Markussen =

Danish footballer (born 1943)

Personal information
- Full name: Jørgen Markussen
- Date of birth: 19 November 1943 (age 82)
- Place of birth: Denmark
- Position: Forward

Youth career
- Tørring IF

Senior career*
Years	Team	Apps	(Gls)
1966–1972	Vejle Boldklub	324	(152)
- Kolding FC
- KÍ Klaksvík

International career
1966–1970	Denmark U21	8	(4)
1970–1972	Denmark	10	(1)
- * Club domestic league appearances and goals

Jørgen Markussen (born 19 November 1943) is a Danish former footballer.

== Life and career ==
Jørgen Markussen played ten games for Denmark scoring a single goal. This goal rate did not match the goal instinct that made Markussen a club legend in Vejle Boldklub.

Markussen's time with Vejle Boldklub made him well known to the minds of Danish football lovers. In Vejle he became famous as - probably - the most dangerous forward in Danish football. His many goals contributed heavily to Vejle winning the Danish championship in 1971 - a triumph, which was followed up the next season when Vejle Boldklub won The double.

With 152 goals Markussen is the second most scoring forward in the history of Vejle Boldklub after Bent Sørensen and with 324 matches he is number six on the all time match record list.

Jørgen Markussen also played a few seasons for Kolding FC and Klaksvik on the Faroe Islands before ending his footballing career.
