= Henry Øberg =

Norwegian football referee

- Born: 18 August 1931
- Died: 23 November 2011 (aged 80)
- Occupations: Football referee, referee advisor

Henry Øberg (18 August 1931 – 23 November 2011) was a Norwegian football referee. He was a member of SK Falk, and from 1968 Hamar IL. He became a FIFA referee in 1967, and officiated in the Olympic football tournament in Münich in 1972 and in the 1974 FIFA World Cup.

Øberg refereed 145 matches in the highest Norwegian league from 1964 until his last match between Vålerenga and Start in 1982, when he received standing ovation from 16 000 spectators. He also refereed the Norwegian cup final in 1968.
