= Leif Eriksson (footballer) =

Swedish footballer and bandy player (born 1942)

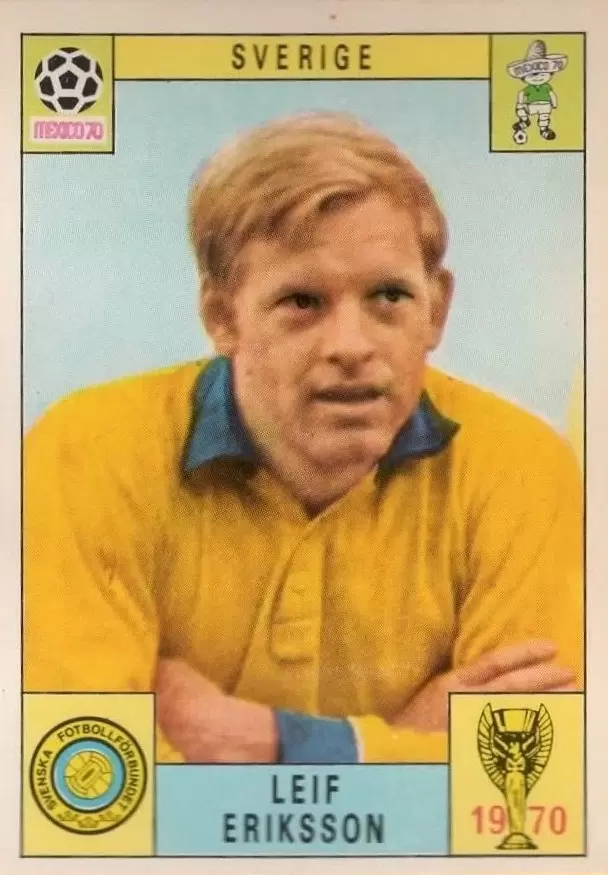
- Eriksson at the 1970 FIFA World Cup

Personal information
- Full name: Leif Anders Eriksson
- Date of birth: 20 March 1942 (age 84)
- Place of birth: Köping, Sweden
- Height: 1.75 m (5 ft 9 in)
- Positions: Midfielder; striker

Youth career
- IK Westmannia

Senior career*
Years	Team	Apps	(Gls)
–1957	IK Westmannia		
1958–1960	Köpings IS		
1960–1966	Djurgårdens IF	117	(62)
1966–1968	IK Sirius	54	(37)
1969–1970	Örebro	43	(15)
1970–1975	Nice	151	(37)
1975–1976	Cannes	29	(9)
1976–1978	IK Sirius	43	(9)
1979–1981	IFK Dannemora/Österby		
Total		437	(169)

International career^{‡}
1959–	Sweden U18	3	(2)
	Sweden U23	2	(0)
	Sweden B	10	(10)
1962–1972	Sweden	49	(12)
- * Club domestic league appearances and goals as of 12 July 2007 ‡ National team caps and goals as of 12 July 2007

Leif Anders Eriksson (born 20 March 1942) is a Swedish retired footballer and bandy player.

He started his career in Sweden playing for Djurgårdens IF, IK Sirius and Örebro SK, until he joined French side OGC Nice where he was elected foreign player of the year by France Football magazine in 1972. He ended his international career in another Côte d'Azur club, AS Cannes.

He was part of Sweden national team at the 1970 FIFA World Cup. He was capped 49 times and scored 12 goals.

As a bandy player, Eriksson played for Djurgårdens IF Bandy 1961–65. In 1966, he won the Swedish championship final with IK Sirius.

== Honours ==
Djurgårdens IF

- Division 2 Svealand: 1961
- Allsvenskan: 1964, 1966
