= Stange SK =

Norwegian sports club

- Full name: Stange Sportsklubb
- Nickname: SSK
- Founded: 20 September 1904
- Ground: Stange idrettspark, Stange
- League: Fifth Division

Stange Sportsklubb is a Norwegian multi-sports club from Stange, Innlandet county. It has sections for association football, floor hockey, ice hockey, speed skating and Nordic skiing.

== General history ==
The club was founded as Stange TF on 20 September 1904. The name was changed when shifting away from being a pure gymnastics club, first to Stange TIF and in 1928 Stange IL. Meanwhile, in Stange there was also a Workers' Confederation of Sport club named Stange AIL from 1935. In 1945, as the Workers' Confederation of Sport merged with the Norwegian Confederation of Sport, Stange IL also merged with Stange AIL, rendering the new name Stange SK.

By the 1950s, the club operated two football fields near Stange Station as well as two ski jumping hills. The club colours were red with white shorts.

New clubrooms were opened in January 2004, as the club entered its 100th year of existence.

== Football ==
The men's football team currently plays in the Fifth Division, the sixth tier of football in Norway. The team spent several years in the Third Division, the fourth tier of Norwegian football, in the 1990s. Following relegation, the team managed to win re-promotion to the Third Division in 2004, the 100th year of the club. The matches against Ottestad IL were described as a minor, local rivalry. The team were relegated in 2008 before managing to get another stint in the Third Division from 2010 to 2011.

In the Norwegian Football Cup, the men's team appeared in the first round in 1980, bowing out to Lillehammer with a 4–0 loss. In 2006, Stange reached the first round again, and drew reigning league champions Vålerenga at home ground. The attendance was a record high 1,700 as Stange came behind 0–2 early on, but then reduced Vålerenga's lead to 1–2. Vålerenga, entering a young team, ultimately secured a comfortable 1–8 away win. Levan Melkadze scored a hat-trick for Vålerenga, a player that went goalless in the league.

== Other sports ==
The club is also known for its speed skaters, including Inger Karset and Martine Ripsrud.

After the Second World War, the club also had sections for team handball and track and field. Boxing, orienteering and tennis were also added. Ahead of the 1993 World Women's Handball Championship, the indoor arena Stangehallen was built, and the four handball clubs in Stange Municipality—Stange, Ottestad, Ilseng and Vallset—formally established the umbrella team Stange HK in March 1992.

In the club's 100th year of existence, swimming was also among the more sizeable sports practised in Stange SK. In January 2018, the swimming section broke out to form its own club.
