= Svein Bjørn Olsen =

Norwegian footballer (1945–1998)

Personal information
- Date of birth: 30 June 1945
- Place of birth: Sandefjord
- Date of death: 18 July 1998 (aged 53)
- Place of death: Sandefjord
- Height: 1.90 m (6 ft 3 in)
- Position: Goalkeeper

Senior career*
| Years | Team | Apps | (Gls) |
| 1964–1965 | Sandefjord | | |
| 1966–1972 | Lyn | | |
| 1973–1974 | Sarpsborg | | |

International career
| 1966 | Norway u-21 | 4 | (0) |
| 1968–1971 | Norway | 10 | (0) |
- * Club domestic league appearances and goals

Svein Bjørn Olsen (30 June 1945 – 18 July 1998) was a Norwegian football goalkeeper.

Olsen played for three top-tier clubs Sandefjord, Lyn and Sarpsborg, becoming league champion in 1968 and cup champion in 1967 and 1968. He represented Norway as an under-21 and senior international.
