= Jan Rodvang =

Norwegian footballer (1939–2020)

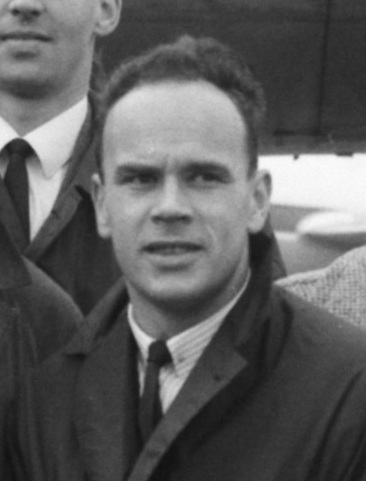

Personal information
- Date of birth: 24 December 1939
- Date of death: 6 November 2020 (aged 80)
- Height: 1.76 m (5 ft 9 in)
- Position: Defender

Senior career*
Years	Team	Apps	(Gls)
1960–1962	Asker		
1963–1974	Lyn		

International career
1961	Norway U21	1	(0)
1963–1965	Norway B	2	(0)
1968–1969	Norway	6	(0)
- * Club domestic league appearances and goals

Jan Rodvang (24 December 1939 – 6 November 2020) was a Norwegian football defender. He mainly played for Lyn, becoming league champion in 1964 and 1968 and cup champion in 1967 and 1968. He represented Norway as an U21, B and senior international.
