= Harald Berg =

Norwegian footballer (born 1941)

Harald "Dutte" Berg
Personal information
- Full name: Harald Johan Berg
- Date of birth: 9 November 1941 (age 84)
- Place of birth: Bodø, Reichskommissariat Norwegen (today Norway)
- Position: Midfielder

Senior career*
Years	Team	Apps	(Gls)
1958–1964	Bodø/Glimt		
1965–1970	Lyn		
1970–1974	FC Den Haag	129	(48)
1974–1981	Bodø/Glimt		

International career
1964–1974	Norway	43	(12)

Managerial career
- 1983: Bodø/Glimt
- * Club domestic league appearances and goals

Harald Johan "Dutte" Berg (born 9 November 1941) is a Norwegian former footballer who played as a midfielder. Nickname "Dutte", he is the brother of Knut Berg, the father of Ørjan Berg, Runar Berg and Arild Berg, and grandfather of Patrick Berg (son of Ørjan) – all of whom have played in the Norwegian top division and been selected for the Norway national football team.

== Club career ==
Born in Bodø, Berg was a significant player for Bodø/Glimt in the late 1950s, early 1960s and 1970s, and Lyn in the 1960s. Helping Lyn winning the league in 1968 and Bodø/Glimt winning the cup final in 1975. In 1969, Lyn and Berg reached the quarter-finals of the European Cup Winners' Cup, where they lost 4-5 (2-3 and 2-2) on aggregate to the Spanish giants F.C. Barcelona. Lyn had to play both matches in Spain due to the harsh weather conditions in Norway during winter.

In the early 1970s Berg played at FC Den Haag in the Netherlands for three seasons.

Harald Berg returned to his mother club in 1974. Back in his home town Bodø, Berg had a Diego Armando Maradona role on the pitch. Bergs decisive contribution as a playmaker made Bodø/Glimt a top Norwegian club in the mid-1970s. He played his last Norwegian top flight match in 1980 the year Bodø/Glimt was relegated. Berg played another season for Bodø/Glimt, then retired after the 1981 season, at the age of 40. In 1983, he briefly managed the team.

== International career ==
He made his debut for Norway in 1964 and went on to collect 43 caps, scoring 12 international goals. His last international match was in 1974.

== Honours ==
Lyn

- Norwegian top division: 1968
- Norwegian Cup: 1967, 1968

Bodø/Glimt

- Norwegian Cup: 1975

Individual

- Norwegian top division top scorer: 1965
