= Ola Dybwad-Olsen =

Norwegian footballer (born 1946)

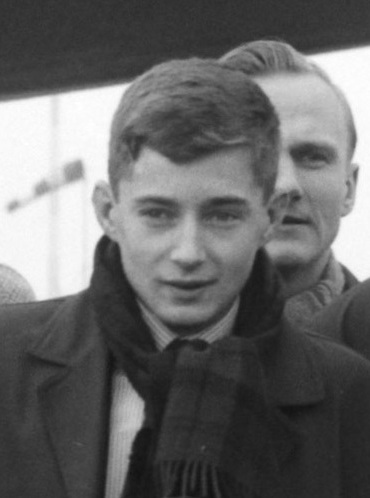
- Dybwad-Olsen in 1964

Personal information
- Date of birth: 4 August 1946 (age 80)
- Place of birth: Oslo, Norway
- Position: Forward

Senior career*
Years	Team	Apps	(Gls)
1964–1978	Lyn	219	(119)
1979–1982	Stabæk		

International career
1968–1972	Norway	24	(11)
- * Club domestic league appearances and goals

Ola Dybwad-Olsen (born 4 August 1946) is a Norwegian former footballer who played as a forward for Lyn, Stabæk and the Norway national team. During his fourteen-year career at Lyn he came to be regarded as one of the greatest players in the club's history. He holds several club records.

== Club career ==
Dybwad-Olsen made his debut for Lyn in 1964 and was part of the title-winning Lyn team of the 1960s. He became Cup Champion with Lyn in 1967, scoring one of the goals in the final (4–1 win against Rosenborg). In the club's most successful year, 1968, he set a still unbeaten club record of scoring 25 goals in 18 league games, and helped Lyn win The Double by scoring in his second consecutive cup final (3–0 win against Mjøndalen).

Ola Dybwad-Olsen made 420 appearances for Lyn from 1964 until 1978. Of these, 142 were games in the 1st Division, in which he scored 69 goals. In a total of 219 league appearances (142 in the 1st Division and 77 in the 2nd Division), he scored 119 goals.

In 1979, he moved across the city border to Bærum and Stabæk, where he played for three years before retiring in 1982, at the age of 36.

== International career ==
Ola Dybwad-Olsen was capped 24 times for his national team, from 1968 to 1972, scoring 11 goals. He debuted against Poland on 9 July 1968. He also featured on the U-21 team (5 games) and the U-19 team (2 games).

== Personal life ==
His son, Ola Dybwad-Olsen Junior, is a professional footballer who also played for Lyn.
