= 1966 FIFA World Cup qualification (UEFA) =

Tournament details
- Dates: 24 May 1964 - 29 December 1965
- Teams: 31 (from 1 confederation)

Tournament statistics
- Matches played: 82
- Goals scored: 250 (3.05 per match)
- Attendance: 2,982,508 (36,372 per match)
- Top scorer: (Portugal) Eusébio (7 goals)

The 32 teams were drawn into nine groups of three or four teams each; however, after the withdrawal of Syria, one group had just two teams. The teams played against each other on a home-and-away basis. The group winners would qualify.

== Groups ==
=== Group 1 ===
| Pos | Team | Pld | W | D | L | GF | GA | GD | Pts | Qualification | (Bulgaria national football team) | (Belgium national football team) | (Israel national football team) |
|---|---|---|---|---|---|---|---|---|---|---|---|---|---|
| 1= | Bulgaria | 4 | 3 | 0 | 1 | 9 | 6 | +3 | 6 | Qualification for play-off | — | 3–0 | 4–0 |
| 1= | Belgium | 4 | 3 | 0 | 1 | 11 | 3 | +8 | 6 | Qualification for play-off | 5–0 | — | 1–0 |
| 3 | Israel | 4 | 0 | 0 | 4 | 1 | 12 | −11 | 0 | | 1–2 | 0–5 | — |

Source: AllWorldCup
Rules for classification: Tiebreakers

=== Group 2 ===
| Pos | Team | Pld | W | D | L | GF | GA | GD | Pts | Qualification | (Germany national football team) | (Sweden men's national football team) | (Cyprus national football team) |
|---|---|---|---|---|---|---|---|---|---|---|---|---|---|
| 1 | West Germany | 4 | 3 | 1 | 0 | 14 | 2 | +12 | 7 | Qualification for 1966 FIFA World Cup | — | 1–1 | 5–0 |
| 2 | Sweden | 4 | 2 | 1 | 1 | 10 | 3 | +7 | 5 | | 1–2 | — | 3–0 |
| 3 | Cyprus | 4 | 0 | 0 | 4 | 0 | 19 | −19 | 0 | | 0–6 | 0–5 | — |

Source: AllWorldCup
Rules for classification: Tiebreakers

=== Group 3 ===
| Pos | Team | Pld | W | D | L | GF | GA | GD | Pts | Qualification | (France national football team) | (Norway national football team) | (Yugoslavia national football team) | (Luxembourg national football team) |
|---|---|---|---|---|---|---|---|---|---|---|---|---|---|---|
| 1 | France | 6 | 5 | 0 | 1 | 9 | 2 | +7 | 10 | Qualification for 1966 FIFA World Cup | — | 1–0 | 1–0 | 4–1 |
| 2 | Norway | 6 | 3 | 1 | 2 | 10 | 5 | +5 | 7 | | 0–1 | — | 3–0 | 4–2 |
| 3 | Yugoslavia | 6 | 3 | 1 | 2 | 10 | 8 | +2 | 7 | | 1–0 | 1–1 | — | 3–1 |
| 4 | Luxembourg | 6 | 0 | 0 | 6 | 6 | 20 | −14 | 0 | | 0–2 | 0–2 | 2–5 | — |

Source: AllWorldCup
Rules for classification: Tiebreakers

=== Group 4 ===
| Pos | Team | Pld | W | D | L | GF | GA | GD | Pts | Qualification | (Portugal national football team) | (Czechoslovakia national football team) | (Romania national football team) | (Turkey national football team) |
|---|---|---|---|---|---|---|---|---|---|---|---|---|---|---|
| 1 | Portugal | 6 | 4 | 1 | 1 | 9 | 4 | +5 | 9 | Qualification for 1966 FIFA World Cup | — | 0–0 | 2–1 | 5–1 |
| 2 | Czechoslovakia | 6 | 3 | 1 | 2 | 12 | 4 | +8 | 7 | | 0–1 | — | 3–1 | 3–1 |
| 3 | Romania | 6 | 3 | 0 | 3 | 9 | 7 | +2 | 6 | | 2–0 | 1–0 | — | 3–0 |
| 4 | Turkey | 6 | 1 | 0 | 5 | 4 | 19 | −15 | 2 | | 0–1 | 0–6 | 2–1 | — |

Source: AllWorldCup
Rules for classification: Tiebreakers

=== Group 5 ===
| Pos | Team | Pld | W | D | L | GF | GA | GD | Pts | Qualification | (Switzerland national football team) | (Northern Ireland national football team) | (Netherlands national football team) | (Albania national football team) |
|---|---|---|---|---|---|---|---|---|---|---|---|---|---|---|
| 1 | Switzerland | 6 | 4 | 1 | 1 | 7 | 3 | +4 | 9 | Qualification for 1966 FIFA World Cup | — | 2–1 | 2–1 | 1–0 |
| 2 | Northern Ireland | 6 | 3 | 2 | 1 | 9 | 5 | +4 | 8 | | 1–0 | — | 2–1 | 4–1 |
| 3 | Netherlands | 6 | 2 | 2 | 2 | 6 | 4 | +2 | 6 | | 0–0 | 0–0 | — | 2–0 |
| 4 | Albania | 6 | 0 | 1 | 5 | 2 | 12 | −10 | 1 | | 0–2 | 1–1 | 0–2 | — |

Source: AllWorldCup
Rules for classification: Tiebreakers

=== Group 6 ===
| Pos | Team | Pld | W | D | L | GF | GA | GD | Pts | Qualification | (Hungary national football team) | (East Germany national football team) | (Austria national football team) |
|---|---|---|---|---|---|---|---|---|---|---|---|---|---|
| 1 | Hungary | 4 | 3 | 1 | 0 | 8 | 3 | +5 | 7 | Qualification for 1966 FIFA World Cup | — | 3–2 | 3–0 |
| 2 | East Germany | 4 | 1 | 2 | 1 | 5 | 5 | 0 | 4 | | 1–1 | — | 1–0 |
| 3 | Austria | 4 | 0 | 1 | 3 | 1 | 6 | −5 | 1 | | 1–1 | 0–1 | — |

Source: AllWorldCup
Rules for classification: Tiebreakers

=== Group 7 ===
| Pos | Team | Pld | W | D | L | GF | GA | GD | Pts | Qualification | (Soviet Union national football team) | (Wales national football team) | (Greece national football team) | (Denmark national football team) |
|---|---|---|---|---|---|---|---|---|---|---|---|---|---|---|
| 1 | Soviet Union | 6 | 5 | 0 | 1 | 19 | 6 | +13 | 10 | Qualification for 1966 FIFA World Cup | — | 2–1 | 3–1 | 6–0 |
| 2 | Wales | 6 | 3 | 0 | 3 | 11 | 9 | +2 | 6 | | 2–1 | — | 4–1 | 4–2 |
| 3 | Greece | 6 | 2 | 1 | 3 | 10 | 14 | −4 | 5 | | 1–4 | 2–0 | — | 4–2 |
| 4 | Denmark | 6 | 1 | 1 | 4 | 7 | 18 | −11 | 3 | | 1–3 | 1–0 | 1–1 | — |

Source: AllWorldCup
Rules for classification: Tiebreakers

=== Group 8 ===
| Pos | Team | Pld | W | D | L | GF | GA | GD | Pts | Qualification | (Italy national football team) | (Scotland national football team) | (Poland national football team) | (Finland national football team) |
|---|---|---|---|---|---|---|---|---|---|---|---|---|---|---|
| 1 | Italy | 6 | 4 | 1 | 1 | 17 | 3 | +14 | 9 | Qualification for 1966 FIFA World Cup | — | 3–0 | 6–1 | 6–1 |
| 2 | Scotland | 6 | 3 | 1 | 2 | 8 | 8 | 0 | 7 | | 1–0 | — | 1–2 | 3–1 |
| 3 | Poland | 6 | 2 | 2 | 2 | 11 | 10 | +1 | 6 | | 0–0 | 1–1 | — | 7–0 |
| 4 | Finland | 6 | 1 | 0 | 5 | 5 | 20 | −15 | 2 | | 0–2 | 1–2 | 2–0 | — |

Source: AllWorldCup
Rules for classification: Tiebreakers

=== Group 9 ===
| Pos | Team | Pld | W | D | L | GF | GA | GD | Pts | Qualification | (Spain national football team) | (Republic of Ireland national football team) | (Syria national football team) |
|---|---|---|---|---|---|---|---|---|---|---|---|---|---|
| 1= | Spain | 2 | 1 | 0 | 1 | 4 | 2 | +2 | 2 | Qualification for play-off | — | 4–1 | Canc. |
| 1= | Republic of Ireland | 2 | 1 | 0 | 1 | 2 | 4 | −2 | 2 | Qualification for play-off | 1–0 | — | Canc. |
| — | Syria | 0 | 0 | 0 | 0 | 0 | 0 | 0 | 0 | | Canc. | Canc. | — |

Source: AllWorldCup
Rules for classification: Tiebreakers

== Goalscorers ==
7 goals

- (Portugal) Eusébio

6 goals

- (Greece) Mimis Papaioannou

5 goals

- (Belgium) Paul Van Himst
- (Bulgaria) Georgi Asparuhov
- (Italy) Sandro Mazzola
- (Northern Ireland) Johnny Crossan
- (Poland) Włodzimierz Lubański
- (Soviet Union) Anatoliy Banishevskiy

4 goals

- (Bulgaria) Nikola Kotkov
- (Czechoslovakia) František Knebort
- (Wales) Roy Vernon
- (Socialist Federal Republic of Yugoslavia) Milan Galić

3 goals

- (Belgium) Johnny Thio
- (Czechoslovakia) Karol Jokl
- (Finland) Juhani Peltonen
- (France) Nestor Combin
- (France) Philippe Gondet
- (Greece) Giorgos Sideris
- (Italy) Paolo Barison
- (Luxembourg) Louis Pilot
- (Poland) Jerzy Sadek
- (Soviet Union) Valentin Kozmich Ivanov
- (Soviet Union) Slava Metreveli
- (Spain) Chus Pereda
- (Switzerland) Köbi Kuhn
- (Wales) Ivor Allchurch
- (West Germany) Rudolf Brunnenmeier

2 goals

- (Czechoslovakia) Ivan Mráz
- (Denmark) Ole Fritsen
- (Denmark) Ole Madsen
- (East Germany) Peter Ducke
- (East Germany) Jürgen Nöldner
- (Hungary) János Farkas
- (Hungary) Máté Fenyvesi
- (Italy) Giacinto Facchetti
- (Italy) Bruno Mora
- (Italy) Gianni Rivera
- (Netherlands) Hennie van Nee
- (Northern Ireland) George Best
- (Norway) Harald Berg
- (Norway) Erik Johansen
- (Poland) Ernest Pol
- (Romania) Nicolae Georgescu
- (Romania) Viorel Mateianu
- (Scotland) John Greig
- (Scotland) Denis Law
- (Soviet Union) Vladimir Barkaya
- (Sweden) Lars Granström
- (Sweden) Bo Larsson
- (Sweden) Agne Simonsson
- (Sweden) Torbjörn Jonsson
- (Switzerland) René-Pierre Quentin
- (Turkey) Fevzi Zemzem
- (West Germany) Werner Krämer
- (West Germany) Wolfgang Overath
- (West Germany) Klaus-Dieter Sieloff
- (Socialist Federal Republic of Yugoslavia) Dragan Džajić

1 goal

- (Albania) Mexhit Haxhiu
- (Albania) Robert Jashari
- (Austria) Erich Hof
- (Belgium) Armand Jurion
- (Belgium) Wilfried Puis
- (Belgium) Jacques Stockman
- (Bulgaria) Stoyan Kitov
- (Bulgaria) Ivan Petkov Kolev
- (Czechoslovakia) Alexander Horváth
- (Czechoslovakia) Dušan Kabát
- (Czechoslovakia) Andrej Kvašňák
- (Denmark) Mogens Berg
- (Denmark) Kaj Poulsen
- (Denmark) Tommy Troelsen
- (East Germany) Eberhard Vogel
- (Finland) Martti Hyvärinen
- (Finland) Semi Nuoranen
- (France) Marcel Artelesa
- (France) André Guy
- (France) Angel Rambert
- (Greece) Andreas Papaemmanouil
- (Hungary) Ferenc Bene
- (Hungary) Kálmán Mészöly
- (Hungary) Dezső Novák
- (Hungary) Gyula Rákosi
- (Republic of Ireland) Andy McEvoy
- (Israel) Rahamim Talbi
- (Italy) Giacomo Bulgarelli
- (Italy) Ezio Pascutti
- (Luxembourg) Ernest Brenner
- (Luxembourg) Edy Dublin
- (Luxembourg) Ady Schmit
- (Netherlands) Frans Geurtsen
- (Netherlands) Theo Laseroms
- (Netherlands) Bennie Muller
- (Netherlands) Daan Schrijvers
- (Northern Ireland) Willie Irvine
- (Northern Ireland) Terry Neill
- (Norway) Per Kristoffersen
- (Norway) Olav Nilsen
- (Norway) Arne Pedersen
- (Norway) Finn Seemann
- (Norway) Kai Sjøberg
- (Norway) Ole Stavrum
- (Poland) Roman Lentner
- (Portugal) Mário Coluna
- (Portugal) Jaime Graça
- (Romania) Sorin Avram
- (Romania) Alexandru Badea
- (Romania) Dan Coe
- (Romania) Carol Creiniceanu
- (Romania) Ion Pârcălab
- (Scotland) Stevie Chalmers
- (Scotland) Dave Gibson
- (Scotland) Billy McNeill
- (Scotland) Davie Wilson
- (Soviet Union) Boris Kazakov
- (Soviet Union) Galimzyan Khusainov
- (Soviet Union) Mikheil Meskhi
- (Soviet Union) Yozhef Sabo
- (Soviet Union) Valery Voronin
- (Spain) Carlos Lapetra
- (Spain) José Ufarte
- (Sweden) Kurt Hamrin
- (Sweden) Ove Kindvall
- (Switzerland) Anton Allemann
- (Switzerland) Robert Hosp
- (Turkey) Ayhan Elmastaşoğlu
- (Turkey) Nedim Doğan
- (Wales) Ron Davies
- (Wales) Wyn Davies
- (Wales) Mike England
- (Wales) Ronnie Rees
- (West Germany) Alfred Heiß
- (West Germany) Uwe Seeler
- (West Germany) Heinz Strehl
- (West Germany) Horst Szymaniak
- (Socialist Federal Republic of Yugoslavia) Dražan Jerković
- (Socialist Federal Republic of Yugoslavia) Vladica Kovačević
- (Socialist Federal Republic of Yugoslavia) Džemaludin Mušović
- (Socialist Federal Republic of Yugoslavia) Velibor Vasović

1 own goal

- (Bulgaria) Ivan Vutsov (playing against Belgium)
- (Cyprus) Kostas Panayiotou (playing against West Germany)
- (Finland) Stig Holmqvist (playing against Italy)
- (Spain) José Ángel Iribar (playing against Ireland)
- (Wales) Graham Williams (playing against the Soviet Union)

== Qualified teams ==
The following 9 countries qualified for the 1966 FIFA World Cup.

| Team | Qualified as | Qualified on | Previous appearances in FIFA World Cup^{1} |
|---|---|---|---|
| Bulgaria | Group 1 winners | 29 December 1965 | 1 (1962) |
| West Germany | Group 2 winners | 14 November 1965 | 4 (1934^{2}, 1938^{2}, **1954**, 1958) |
| France | Group 3 winners | 6 November 1965 | 5 (1934, 1938, 1950, 1954, 1958) |
| Portugal | Group 4 winners | 21 November 1965 | 0 (debut) |
| Switzerland | Group 5 winners | 14 November 1965 | 5 (1934, 1938, 1950, **1954**, 1962) |
| Hungary | Group 6 winners | 9 October 1965 | 5 (1934, 1938, 1954, 1958, 1962) |
| Soviet Union | Group 7 winners | 27 October 1965 | 2 (1958, 1962) |
| Italy | Group 8 winners | 5 December 1965 | 5 (**1934**, **1938**, 1950, 1954, 1962) |
| Spain | Group 9 winners | 10 November 1965 | 3 (1934, 1950, 1962) |

^{1} Bold indicates champions for that year. Italic indicates hosts for that year.
^{2}Competed as Germany
