= 1966 FIFA World Cup qualification =

Tournament details
- Dates: 24 May 1964 – 29 December 1965
- Teams: 74 (from 5 confederations)

Tournament statistics
- Matches played: 127
- Goals scored: 393 (3.09 per match)
- Top scorer: (Portugal) Eusébio (7 goals)

The 1966 FIFA World Cup qualification was a series of tournaments organised by the five FIFA confederations. The 1966 FIFA World Cup featured 16 teams with one place reserved for the host nation, England, and one reserved for defending champions Brazil. The remaining 14 places were determined by a qualification process in which the other 72 entered teams, from the five FIFA confederations, competed. UEFA, CONCACAF and CONMEBOL qualification was determined within the confederations, whilst AFC and CAF teams (alongside Australia) competed for one place at the tournament.

Of these 72 teams, 51 competed, while Guatemala, Congo-Brazzaville and the Philippines had their entries rejected.

In the Africa/Asia/Oceania zone:

- South Africa were disqualified after being suspended by FIFA due to apartheid.
- All 15 African nations later boycotted in protest after FIFA, citing competitive and logistical issues, confirmed there would be no direct qualification for an African team, with Syria (who were grouped in Europe) withdrawing in support of the African teams.
- South Korea were forced to withdraw due to logistical issues after the Asia/Oceania tournament was moved from Japan to Cambodia.

The first qualification match, between Netherlands and Albania, was played on 24 May 1964 and the first goal in qualification was a penalty, scored by Dutch defender Daan Schrijvers. Qualification ended on 29 December 1965, when Bulgaria eliminated Belgium in a group tiebreaker to become the final qualifier for the World Cup.

There were 393 goals scored over 127 games, for an average of 3.09 goals per game and 51 teams played in qualification.

== Qualified teams ==
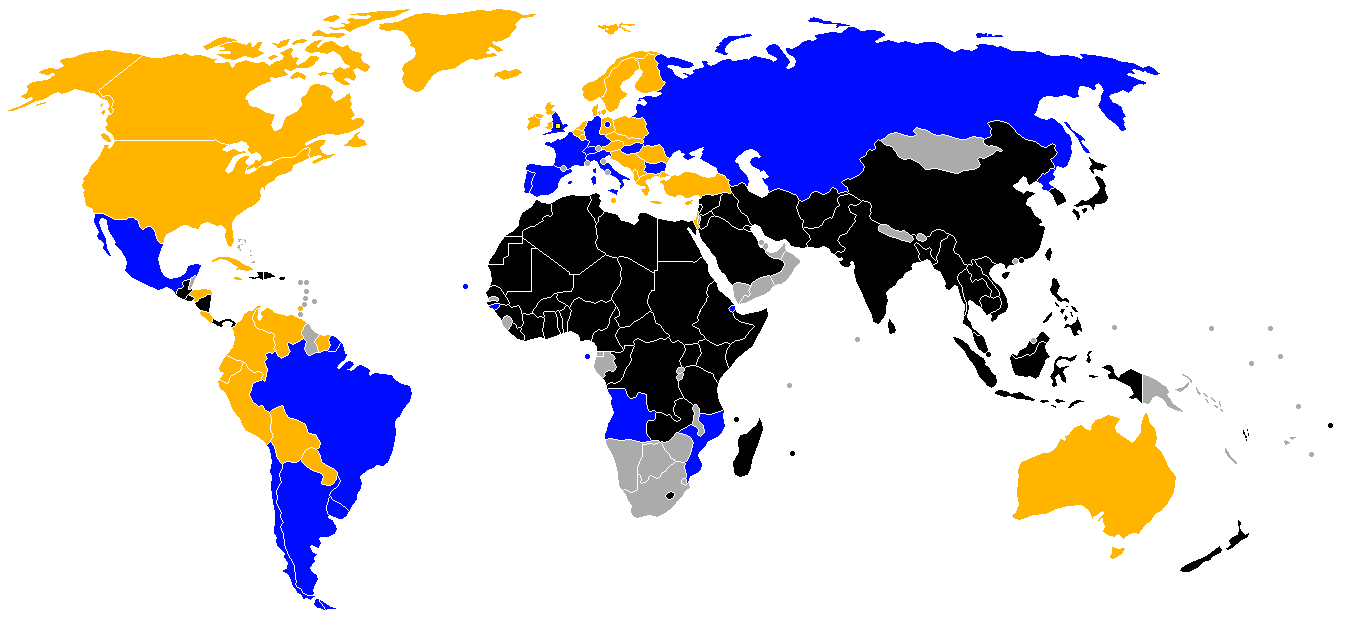
Country qualified for World Cup Country failed to qualify Country did not enter World Cup Country not a FIFA member

Team	Method of qualification	Date of qualification	Finals appearance	Streak	Previous best performance
England	Hosts	22 August 1960	5th	5	Quarter-finals (1954, 1962)
Brazil	Defending champions	17 June 1962	8th	8	Winners (1958, 1962)
Mexico	CONCACAF final round winners	16 May 1965	6th	5	Group stage (1930, 1950, 1954, 1958, 1962)
Uruguay	CONMEBOL Group 1 winners	13 June 1965	5th	2	Winners (1930, 1950)
Argentina	CONMEBOL Group 3 winners	22 August 1965	5th	3	Runners-up (1930)
Hungary	UEFA Group 6 winners	9 October 1965	6th	4	Runners-up (1938, 1954)
Chile	CONMEBOL Group 2 winners (Note: Group ended with two teams tied on points, meaning a play-off was required.)	12 October 1965	4th	2	Third place (1962)
Soviet Union	UEFA Group 7 winners	17 October 1965	3rd	3	Quarter-finals (1958, 1962)
Portugal	UEFA Group 4 winners	31 October 1965	1st	1	–
France	UEFA Group 3 winners	6 November 1965	6th	1	Third place (1958)
Spain	UEFA Group 9 winners	10 November 1965	4th	2	Fourth place (1950)
West Germany	UEFA Group 2 winners	14 November 1965	6th	4	Winners (1954)
North Korea	Asia/Oceania first round winners (Note: Due to the withdrawal of all CAF nations, the Final Round was scratched and North Korea qualified.)	24 November 1965	1st	1	–
Switzerland	UEFA Group 5 winners	24 November 1965	6th	2	Quarter-finals (1934, 1938, 1954)
Italy	UEFA Group 8 winners	7 December 1965	6th	2	Winners (1934, 1938)
Bulgaria	UEFA Group 1 winners	29 December 1965	2nd	2	Group stage (1962)

== Qualification process ==
The 16 spots available in the 1966 World Cup were distributed among the continental zones as follows:

- Europe (UEFA): 10 places, 1 of them went to automatic qualifier England, while the other 9 places were contested by 32 teams (including Israel and Syria).
- South America (CONMEBOL): 4 places, 1 of them went to automatic qualifier Brazil, while the other 3 places were contested by 9 teams.
- North, Central America and Caribbean (CONCACAF): 1 place, contested by 10 teams.
- Africa and Asia (CAF/AFC): 1 place, contested by 19 teams (including Australia from Oceania).

UEFA, CONMEBOL and CONCACAF had a guaranteed number of places, whereas the CAF and AFC had to contest a play-off to determine which confederation would be represented.

After the first round of 1966 FIFA World Cup finals, the percentage of teams from each confederation that passed through to the quarter-finals was as follows:

- AFC (Asia): 100% (1 of 1 places)
- CAF (Africa): No nations entered
- CONCACAF (North, Central American and Caribbean): 0% (0 of 1 places)
- CONMEBOL (South America): 50% (2 of 4 places)
- Oceania (No confederation): Only entrant, Australia, failed to qualify
- UEFA (Europe): 50% (5 of 10 places)

=== Summary of qualification ===
Confederation	Teams started	Teams that secured qualification	Teams that were eliminated	Total places in finals	Qualifying start date	Qualifying end date
AFC, CAF and Oceania	21	1	20	1	21 November 1965	24 November 1965
CONCACAF	10	1	9	1	16 January 1965	22 May 1965
CONMEBOL	9+1	3+1	6	3+1	16 May 1965	12 October 1965
UEFA (Note: Syria and Israel, although members of AFC, competed in European qualification.)	32+1	9+1	23	9+1	24 May 1964	29 December 1965
Total	72+2	14+2	58	14+2	24 May 1964	29 December 1965

=== Tiebreakers ===
For FIFA World Cup qualifying stages using a league format, the method used for separating teams level on points was the same for all Confederations. If teams were even on points at the end of group play, the tied teams played a play-off at a neutral ground.

== Confederation qualification ==
=== AFC, CAF and Oceania ===
21 teams – Australia (who were not a member of a confederation at the time, as the OFC was not founded until 1966), South Africa (who had been expelled from CAF in 1958 due to the country's apartheid policies), three teams from AFC and 16 teams from CAF – applied to take part in qualification, but the entries of Congo-Brazzaville and the Philippines were rejected; the former for submitting their application after the deadline and the latter due to their entry fee not being paid in time.

The qualification process began with four national teams split between two sections for qualification: Israel and Syria competed in European qualification for geographical reasons, whilst North Korea and South Korea were in a group with Australia and South Africa. The winner of this group would then go on to play the three group winners from the second round of CAF qualifiers.

However, South Africa was disqualified after being suspended by FIFA, and all 15 members of CAF boycotted in protest after FIFA, citing competitive and logistical issues, confirmed that there would be no direct qualification for an African team. Less than three weeks before the tournament, South Korea were forced to withdraw due to logistical difficulties after the tournament was moved from Japan to Cambodia.

Pos	Team	Pld	W	D	L	GF	GA	GD	Pts
1	North Korea	2	2	0	0	9	2	+7	4
2	Australia	2	0	0	2	2	9	−7	0
—	South Africa (D)	0	–	–	–	–	–	—	0
—	South Korea (W)	0	–	–	–	–	–	—	0

(D) Disqualified; (W) Withdrew

==== African boycott ====
Qualification for the 15 remaining African teams saw them sorted into six groups: three groups of two and three groups of three.

The winners of these groups were then to play a two-legged tie in the following combinations: Group 1 winners v Group 5 winners, Group 2 winners v Group 4 winners and Group 3 winners v Group 6 winners, with the winners advancing to play in the final group with each other and the winner of the Asia/Oceania group.

However, the African nations were aggrieved that their second-round winners would be required to enter a final round against the winners of the Asia/Oceania group in order to qualify for the final tournament: they demanded that Africa be represented in the tournament, and also objected to the readmission of South Africa to FIFA in 1963.

Due to pressure from the African nations and CAF, South Africa was suspended again on 21 September 1964, and were subsequently disqualified. However, after FIFA declined to change the qualifying format or the allocation of places, citing competitive and logistical issues, all 15 African teams immediately boycotted the competition: subsequently, CAF informed FIFA that they would refuse to participate in qualifying for 1970 unless at least one African team had an automatic place in the World Cup.

In 1968, FIFA unanimously voted to grant an automatic place for CAF from the 1970 World Cup onwards.

=== CONCACAF ===
10 teams initially entered, but the entry of Guatemala was rejected.

The remaining nine teams were placed in to three groups of three, with the winner of each group proceeding to a final group. The winner of this group would go on to the final tournament.

Legend
Country that directly qualified for the 1966 World Cup

Final positions (final round)
Team	Pld	W	D	L	GF	GA	GD	Pts
Mexico	4	3	1	0	12	2	+10	7
Costa Rica	4	1	2	1	8	2	+6	4
Jamaica	4	0	1	3	3	19	−16	1

=== CONMEBOL ===
As Brazil had already qualified as reigning champions, the remaining nine CONMEBOL teams were split into three groups of 3, playing each other twice (home and away). The top team from each group qualified.

Legend
Countries that directly qualified for the 1966 World Cup
Countries that took part in a group play-off

==== Final positions (group stage) ====
Group 1

Pos	Team	Pld	W	D	L	Pts	Qualification
1	Uruguay	4	4	0	0	8	Final Tournament
2	Peru	4	2	0	2	4	
3	Venezuela	4	0	0	4	0	

Group 2

Pos	Team	Pld	W	D	L	Pts	Qualification
1=	Chile	4	2	1	1	5	Final Tournament
1=	Ecuador	4	2	1	1	5	
3	Colombia	4	1	0	3	2	

Group 3

Pos	Team	Pld	W	D	L	Pts	Qualification
1	Argentina	4	3	1	0	7	Final Tournament
2	Paraguay	4	1	1	2	3	
3	Bolivia	4	1	0	3	2	

In Group B, Chile and Ecuador finished level on points, and a play-off on neutral ground was played to decide who would qualify. Chile won the match to win the group.

=== UEFA ===
England qualified automatically as hosts and a further 30 European teams took part in qualification. They were joined by Israel and Syria, although Syria then withdrew in support of the African teams. The teams were divided into 9 groups - four groups of 3 and five groups of 4. Syria's withdrawal meant that group 9 only contained two teams.

Legend
Countries that directly qualified for the 1966 World Cup
Countries that took part in a group play-off

==== Final positions (group stage) ====
Group 1

Pos	Team	Pld	W	D	L	Pts	Qualification
1=	Belgium	4	3	0	1	6	
1=	Bulgaria	4	3	0	1	6	Final Tournament
3	Israel	4	0	0	4	0	

Group 2

Pos	Team	Pld	W	D	L	Pts	Qualification
1	West Germany	4	3	1	0	7	Final Tournament
2	Sweden	4	2	1	1	5	
3	Cyprus	4	0	0	4	0	

Group 3

Pos	Team	Pld	W	D	L	Pts	Qualification
1	France	6	5	0	1	10	Final Tournament
2	Norway	6	3	1	2	7	
3	Yugoslavia	6	3	1	2	7	
4	Luxembourg	6	0	0	6	0	

Group 4

Pos	Team	Pld	W	D	L	Pts	Qualification
1	Portugal	6	4	1	1	9	Final Tournament
2	Czechoslovakia	6	3	1	2	7	
3	Romania	6	3	0	3	6	
4	Turkey	6	1	0	5	2	

Group 5

Pos	Team	Pld	W	D	L	Pts	Qualification
1	Switzerland	6	4	1	1	9	Final Tournament
2	Northern Ireland	6	3	2	1	8	
3	Netherlands	6	2	2	2	6	
4	Albania	6	0	1	5	1	

Group 6

Pos	Team	Pld	W	D	L	Pts	Qualification
1	Hungary	4	3	1	0	7	Final Tournament
2	East Germany	4	1	2	1	4	
3	Austria	4	0	1	3	1	

Group 7

Pos	Team	Pld	W	D	L	Pts	Qualification
1	Soviet Union	6	5	0	1	10	Final Tournament
2	Wales	6	3	0	3	6	
3	Greece	6	2	1	3	5	
4	Denmark	6	1	1	4	3	

Group 8

Pos	Team	Pld	W	D	L	Pts	Qualification
1	Italy	6	4	1	1	9	Final Tournament
2	Scotland	6	3	1	2	7	
3	Poland	6	2	2	2	6	
4	Finland	6	1	0	5	2	

Group 9

Pos	Team	Pld	W	D	L	Pts	Qualification
1=	Spain	2	1	0	1	2	Final Tournament
1=	Republic of Ireland	2	1	0	1	2	
—	Syria	Withdrew					

In Group 1, Belgium and Bulgaria finished level on points, and a play-off on neutral ground was played to decide who would qualify. Bulgaria won the match 2–1.

In Group 9, the Republic of Ireland and Spain finished level on points, and a play-off on neutral ground was played to decide who would qualify. Spain won the match 1–0.

== Goalscorers ==
7 goals

- (Portugal) Eusébio

6 goals

- (Greece) Mimis Papaioannou

5 goals

- (Belgium) Paul Van Himst
- (Bulgaria) Georgi Asparuhov
- (Italy) Sandro Mazzola
- (Mexico) Isidoro Díaz
- (Northern Ireland) Jobby Crossan
- (Poland) Włodzimierz Lubański
- (Soviet Union) Anatoliy Banishevskiy
- (Uruguay) Héctor Silva

4 goals

- (Bulgaria) Nikola Kotkov
- (Costa Rica) Errol Daniels
- (Costa Rica) Leonel Hernández
- (Czechoslovakia) František Knebort
- (Mexico) Ernesto Cisneros
- (Uruguay) Pedro Rocha
- (Wales) Roy Vernon
- (Socialist Federal Republic of Yugoslavia) Milan Galić

3 goals

- (Argentina) Luis Artime
- (Argentina) Ermindo Onega
- (Belgium) Johnny Thio
- (Chile) Alberto Fouilloux
- (Chile) Leonel Sánchez
- (Costa Rica) Edgar Marín
- (Costa Rica) William Quirós
- (Czechoslovakia) Karol Jokl
- (Ecuador) Enrique Raymondi
- (Finland) Juhani Peltonen
- (France) Nestor Combin
- (France) Philippe Gondet
- (Greece) Giorgos Sideris
- (Italy) Paolo Barison
- (Jamaica) Lascelles Dunkley
- (Luxembourg) Louis Pilot
- (North Korea) Pak Seung-Zin
- (Peru) Pedro Pablo León
- (Poland) Jerzy Sadek
- (Soviet Union) Valentin Kozmich Ivanov
- (Soviet Union) Slava Metreveli
- (Spain) Chus Pereda
- (Suriname (Kingdom of the Netherlands)) Siegfried Haltman
- (Switzerland) Köbi Kuhn
- (Wales) Ivor Allchurch
- (West Germany) Rudolf Brunnenmeier

2 goals

- (Argentina) Raúl Bernao
- (Australia) Les Scheinflug
- (Chile) Carlos Campos Sánchez
- (Chile) Rubén Marcos
- (Chile) Eugenio Méndez
- (Chile) Ignacio Prieto
- (Colombia) Antonio Rada
- (Colombia) Hermenegildo Segrera
- (Czechoslovakia) Ivan Mráz
- (Denmark) Ole Fritsen
- (Denmark) Ole Madsen
- (East Germany) Peter Ducke
- (East Germany) Jürgen Nöldner
- (Ecuador) Alberto Spencer
- (Hungary) János Farkas
- (Hungary) Máté Fenyvesi
- (Italy) Giacinto Facchetti
- (Italy) Bruno Mora
- (Italy) Gianni Rivera
- (Mexico) José Luis González Dávila
- (Mexico) Javier Fragoso
- (Mexico) Aarón Padilla Gutiérrez
- (Mexico) Salvador Reyes Monteón
- (Netherlands) Hennie van Nee
- (Netherlands Antilles) Virgilio Sille
- (North Korea) Han Bong-Zin
- (North Korea) Kim Seung-Il
- (Northern Ireland) George Best
- (Norway) Harald Berg
- (Norway) Erik Johansen
- (Peru) Luis Zavalla
- (Poland) Ernest Pol
- (Romania) Nicolae Georgescu
- (Romania) Viorel Mateianu
- (Scotland) John Greig
- (Scotland) Denis Law
- (Soviet Union) Vladimir Barkaya
- (Suriname (Kingdom of the Netherlands)) Stanley Humbert Krenten
- (Suriname (Kingdom of the Netherlands)) Edmund Waterval
- (Sweden) Lars Granström
- (Sweden) Bo Larsson
- (Sweden) Agne Simonsson
- (Sweden) Torbjörn Jonsson
- (Switzerland) René-Pierre Quentin
- (Trinidad and Tobago) Andy Aleong
- (Turkey) Fevzi Zemzem
- (United States) Ed Murphy
- (West Germany) Werner Krämer
- (West Germany) Wolfgang Overath
- (West Germany) Klaus-Dieter Sieloff
- (Socialist Federal Republic of Yugoslavia) Dragan Džajić

1 goal

- (Albania) Mexhit Haxhiu
- (Albania) Robert Jashari
- (Austria) Erich Hof
- (Belgium) Armand Jurion
- (Belgium) Wilfried Puis
- (Belgium) Jacques Stockman
- (Bolivia) Fortunato Castillo
- (Bolivia) Ramón Quevedo
- (Bolivia) Rolando Vargas
- (Bulgaria) Stoyan Kitov
- (Bulgaria) Ivan Petkov Kolev
- (Costa Rica) Fernando Jiménez
- (Costa Rica) Tarcisio Rodríguez Viquez
- (Costa Rica) Juan González Soto
- (Cuba) Nicolás Martínez
- (Cuba) Ángel Piedra
- (Cuba) Antonio dos Santos
- (Czechoslovakia) Alexander Horváth
- (Czechoslovakia) Dušan Kabát
- (Czechoslovakia) Andrej Kvašňák
- (Denmark) Mogens Berg
- (Denmark) Kaj Poulsen
- (Denmark) Tommy Troelsen
- (East Germany) Eberhard Vogel
- (Ecuador) Romulo Gómez
- (Ecuador) Washington Muñoz
- (Finland) Martti Hyvärinen
- (Finland) Semi Nuoranen
- (France) Marcel Artelesa
- (France) André Guy
- (France) Angel Rambert
- (Greece) Andreas Papaemmanouil
- (Honduras) José Ricardo Taylor
- (Hungary) Ferenc Bene
- (Hungary) Kálmán Mészöly
- (Hungary) Dezső Novák
- (Hungary) Gyula Rákosi
- (Republic of Ireland) Andy McEvoy
- (Israel) Rahamim Talbi
- (Italy) Giacomo Bulgarelli
- (Italy) Ezio Pascutti
- (Jamaica) Syd Bartlett
- (Jamaica) Oscar Black
- (Jamaica) Patrick Blair
- (Jamaica) Art Welch
- (Jamaica) Asher Welch
- (Luxembourg) Ernest Brenner
- (Luxembourg) Edy Dublin
- (Luxembourg) Ady Schmit
- (Mexico) José Luis Aussin
- (Mexico) Ignacio Jáuregui
- (Mexico) Ramiro Navarro
- (Netherlands) Frans Geurtsen
- (Netherlands) Theo Laseroms
- (Netherlands) Bennie Muller
- (Netherlands) Daan Schrijvers
- (North Korea) Im Seung-Hwi
- (North Korea) Pak Doo-Ik
- (Northern Ireland) Willie Irvine
- (Northern Ireland) Terry Neill
- (Norway) Per Kristoffersen
- (Norway) Olav Nilsen
- (Norway) Arne Pedersen
- (Norway) Finn Seemann
- (Norway) Kai Sjøberg
- (Norway) Ole Stavrum
- (Paraguay) Celino Mora
- (Paraguay) Vicente Rodríguez
- (Paraguay) Juan Carlos Rojas
- (Peru) Nemesio Mosquera
- (Peru) Jesús Peláez
- (Peru) Víctor Zegarra
- (Poland) Roman Lentner
- (Portugal) Mário Coluna
- (Portugal) Jaime Graça
- (Romania) Sorin Avram
- (Romania) Alexandru Badea
- (Romania) Dan Coe
- (Romania) Carol Creiniceanu
- (Romania) Ion Pârcălab
- (Scotland) Stevie Chalmers
- (Scotland) Dave Gibson
- (Scotland) Billy McNeill
- (Scotland) Davie Wilson
- (Soviet Union) Boris Kazakov
- (Soviet Union) Galimzyan Khusainov
- (Soviet Union) Mikheil Meskhi
- (Soviet Union) Yozhef Sabo
- (Soviet Union) Valery Voronin
- (Spain) Carlos Lapetra
- (Spain) José Ufarte
- (Suriname (Kingdom of the Netherlands)) Kenneth Kluivert
- (Sweden) Kurt Hamrin
- (Sweden) Ove Kindvall
- (Switzerland) Anton Allemann
- (Switzerland) Robert Hosp
- (Trinidad and Tobago) Alvin Corneal
- (Trinidad and Tobago) Jeff Gellineau
- (Trinidad and Tobago) Bobby Sookram
- (Turkey) Ayhan Elmastaşoğlu
- (Turkey) Nedim Doğan
- (United States) Helmut Bicek
- (United States) Walt Schmotolocha
- (Uruguay) Danilo Menezes
- (Uruguay) José Urruzmendi
- (Venezuela) Freddy Elie
- (Venezuela) Rafael Santana
- (Venezuela) Humberto Francisco Scovino
- (Venezuela) Argenis Tortolero
- (Wales) Ron Davies
- (Wales) Wyn Davies
- (Wales) Mike England
- (Wales) Ronnie Rees
- (West Germany) Alfred Heiß
- (West Germany) Uwe Seeler
- (West Germany) Heinz Strehl
- (West Germany) Horst Szymaniak
- (Socialist Federal Republic of Yugoslavia) Dražan Jerković
- (Socialist Federal Republic of Yugoslavia) Vladica Kovačević
- (Socialist Federal Republic of Yugoslavia) Džemaludin Mušović
- (Socialist Federal Republic of Yugoslavia) Velibor Vasović

1 own goal

- (Argentina) José Ramos Delgado (playing against Bolivia)
- (Bulgaria) Ivan Vutsov (playing against Belgium)
- (Cyprus) Kostas Panayiotou (playing against West Germany)
- (Finland) Stig Holmqvist (playing against Italy)
- (Paraguay) Ricardo González (playing against Argentina)
- (Spain) José Ángel Iribar (playing against Ireland)
- (Wales) Graham Williams (playing against the Soviet Union)
