= 1964–65 in Belgian football =

Football in Belgium
- Season: 1964–65

The 1964–65 season was the 62nd season of competitive football in Belgium. RSC Anderlechtois won their 11th Division I title and joined RU Saint-Gilloise as the club with the most championship wins in Belgium. They also won the Belgian Cup final against rivals Standard Liège (3-2 after extra time). RSC Anderlechtois entered the 1964–65 European Champion Clubs' Cup as Belgian title holder and for the first time the Cup holder ARA La Gantoise entered the European Cup Winners' Cup. RFC Liégeois, RU Saint-Gilloise and R Antwerp FC all played the 1964–65 Inter-Cities Fairs Cup. The Belgium national football team started their 1966 FIFA World Cup qualification campaign by defeating Israel 1-0.

== Overview ==
The Belgium national football team was drawn in the 1966 FIFA World Cup qualification group 1 with Israel and Bulgaria. Belgium won the first game against Israël, with the 3 other games being played during the 1965-66 season. For the first and only time in their history, Belgium started a game with all field players from the same club (RSC Anderlechtois) in the game against the Netherlands on September 30, 1964. Only the goalkeeper Guy Delhasse was from RFC Liégeois, but he was substituted at half time for Anderlecht keeper Jean-Marie Trappeniers. The manager of the national team was at the time Constant Vanden Stock, a former RSC Anderlechtois player and the future chairman of the club.

At the end of the season, RU Saint-Gilloise and KFC Diest were relegated to Division II and were replaced by R Racing White and RFC Malinois from Division II.
The bottom 2 clubs in Division II (KSC Eendracht Aalst and K Boom FC) were relegated to Division III, to be replaced by K Willebroekse SV and RFC Sérésien from Division III.
The bottom club of each Division III league (RRC de Gand, RFC Renaisien, Voorwaarts Tienen and R Uccle Sport) were relegated to the Promotion, to be replaced by RU Hutoise FC, K White Star Club Lauwe, KFC Brasschaat and RC de Jette from Promotion.

== National team ==
Date	Venue	Opponents	Score*	Comp	Belgium scorers
September 30, 1964	Bosuilstadion, Antwerp (H)	Netherlands	1-0	F	Armand Jurion
October 21, 1964	Wembley Stadium, London (A)	England	2-2	F	Jean Cornelis, Paul Van Himst
December 2, 1964	Heysel Stadium, Brussels (H)	France	3-0	F	Paul Van Himst, Frans Vermeyen
March 24, 1965	Dalymount Park, Dublin (A)	Republic of Ireland	2-0	F	Andy McEvoy (o.g.), Armand Jurion
April 7, 1965	Heysel Stadium, Brussels (H)	Poland	0-0	F
May 9, 1965	Heysel Stadium, Brussels (H)	Israel	1-0	WCQ	Armand Jurion
June 2, 1965	Estádio do Maracanã, Rio de Janeiro (A)	Brazil	0-5	F

* Belgium score given first

Key

- H = Home match
- A = Away match
- N = On neutral ground
- F = Friendly
- WCQ = World Cup qualification
- o.g. = own goal

== European competitions ==
RSC Anderlechtois entered at the preliminary round of the 1964–65 European Champion Clubs' Cup and beat Bologna FC of Italy on a coin toss after the play-off game, since both teams were still level (won 1-0 at home, lost 1-2 away, drew 0-0 in the play-off game).
In the first round, they lost to Liverpool FC (lost 0-3 away, 0-1 at home).

For the first time, the Cup holder of Belgium entered the 1964–65 European Cup Winners' Cup. ARA La Gantoise was eliminated by West Ham United in the first round (lost 0-1 at home, drew 1-1 away).

Three Belgian clubs entered the 1964–65 Inter-Cities Fairs Cup: In the first round, RFC Liégeois beat two times winner Valencia FC of Spain (drew 1-1 away, won 3-1 at home), R Antwerp FC beat Hertha BSC Berlin of Germany (lost 1-2 away, won 2-0 at home), but RU Saint-Gilloise lost to Juventus FC of Italy (lost both legs 0-1).
In the second round, RFC Liégeois beat DOS Utrecht (won both legs 2-0), but Antwerp lost to Athletic Bilbao of Spain (lost 0-2 away, 0-1 at home).
RFC Liégeois was the only Belgian club to play in European competitions after the winter break, but they lost in the third round to Atlético de Madrid of Spain (won 1-0 at home, lost 0-2 away).

== Honours ==
Competition	Winner
Division I	RSC Anderlechtois
Cup	RSC Anderlechtois
Division II	R Racing White
Division III	K Willebroekse SV and RFC Sérésien
Promotion	RU Hutoise FC, K White Star Club Lauwe, KFC Brasschaat and RC de Jette

== Final league tables ==
=== Premier Division ===
- 1964-65 Top scorer: Jean-Paul Colonval (R Tilleur FC) with 25 goals
- 1964 Golden Shoe: Wilfried Puis (RSC Anderlechtois)
