= 1966 FIFA World Cup qualification – UEFA Group 5 =

Football tournament

The four teams in this group played against each other on a home-and-away basis. The winner Switzerland qualified for the eighth FIFA World Cup held in England.

== Standings ==
Pos	Team	Pld	W	D	L	GF	GA	GD	Pts	Qualification	(Switzerland national football team)	(Northern Ireland national football team)	(Netherlands national football team)	(Albania national football team)
1	Switzerland	6	4	1	1	7	3	+4	9	Qualification for 1966 FIFA World Cup	—	2–1	2–1	1–0
2	Northern Ireland	6	3	2	1	9	5	+4	8		1–0	—	2–1	4–1
3	Netherlands	6	2	2	2	6	4	+2	6		0–0	0–0	—	2–0
4	Albania	6	0	1	5	2	12	−10	1		0–2	1–1	0–2	—

Source: AllWorldCup
Rules for classification: Tiebreakers

== Matches ==
24 May 1964

Netherlands	2–0	Albania
Schrijvers 48' (pen.); Muller 52'	Report

Rotterdam, Netherlands
Attendance: 28,745
Referee: John Meighan (Republic of Ireland)

14 October 1964

Northern Ireland	1–0	Switzerland
Crossan 46' (pen.)	Report

Belfast, Northern Ireland
Attendance: 28,598
Referee: Hubert Burguet (Belgium)

25 October 1964

Albania	0–2	Netherlands
	Report	Van Nee 2'; Geurtsen 87'

Tirana, Albania
Attendance: 25,579
Referee: Kostadin Dinov (Bulgaria)

14 November 1964

Switzerland	2–1	Northern Ireland
Quentin 29'; Kuhn 34'	Report	Best 13'

Lausanne, Switzerland
Attendance: 22,162
Referee: Paul Schiller (Austria)

17 March 1965

Northern Ireland	2–1	Netherlands
Crossan 11'; Neill 62'	Report	Van Nee 6'

Belfast, Northern Ireland
Attendance: 35,300
Referee: Kaj Sørensen (Denmark)

7 April 1965

Netherlands	0–0	Northern Ireland
	Report

Rotterdam, Netherlands
Attendance: 61,954
Referee: William Clements (England)

11 April 1965

Albania	0–2	Switzerland
	Report	Quentin 21'; Kuhn 88' (pen.)

Tirana, Albania
Attendance: 27,291
Referee: Antonio Sbardella (Italy)

2 May 1965

Switzerland	1–0	Albania
Kuhn 10' (pen.)	Report

Geneva, Switzerland
Attendance: 24,108
Referee: Adolfo Bueno Perales (Spain)

7 May 1965

Northern Ireland	4–1	Albania
Crossan 16', 30', 61' (pen.); Best 85'	Report	Jashari 49'

Belfast, Northern Ireland
Attendance: 16,017
Referee: Norman Mootz (Luxembourg)

17 October 1965

Netherlands	0–0	Switzerland
	Report

Amsterdam, Netherlands
Attendance: 57,759
Referee: Johan Einar Boström (Sweden)

14 November 1965

Switzerland	2–1	Netherlands
Hosp 10'; Allemann 87'	Report	Laseroms 64'

Bern, Switzerland
Attendance: 44,009
Referee: Kurt Tschenscher (West Germany)

24 November 1965

Albania	1–1	Northern Ireland
Haxhiu 77'	Report	Irvine 58'

Tirana, Albania
Attendance: 17,381
Referee: Petre Sotir (Romania)
