= 1966 FIFA World Cup qualification – UEFA Group 8 =

Football tournament

The four teams in this group played against each other on a home-and-away basis. The winner Italy qualified for the eighth FIFA World Cup held in England.

== Standings ==
Pos	Team	Pld	W	D	L	GF	GA	GD	Pts	Qualification	(Italy national football team)	(Scotland national football team)	(Poland national football team)	(Finland national football team)
1	Italy	6	4	1	1	17	3	+14	9	Qualification for 1966 FIFA World Cup	—	3–0	6–1	6–1
2	Scotland	6	3	1	2	8	8	0	7		1–0	—	1–2	3–1
3	Poland	6	2	2	2	11	10	+1	6		0–0	1–1	—	7–0
4	Finland	6	1	0	5	5	20	−15	2		0–2	1–2	2–0	—

Source: AllWorldCup
Rules for classification: Tiebreakers

== Matches ==
21 October 1964

Scotland	3–1	Finland
Law 2'; Chalmers 38'; Gibson 42'	Report	Peltonen 70'

Glasgow, Scotland
Attendance: 54,442
Referee: Joseph Hannet (Belgium)

4 November 1964

Italy	6–1	Finland
Facchetti 1'; Holmqvist 8' (o.g.); Rivera 16'; Bulgarelli 49'; Mazzola 54', 83'	Report	Peltonen 88'

Genoa, Italy
Attendance: 23,000
Referee: Manuel Lousada Rodrigues (Portugal)

18 April 1965

Poland	0–0	Italy
	Report

Warsaw, Poland
Attendance: 31,045
Referee: Piet Roomer (Netherlands)

23 May 1965

Poland	1–1	Scotland
Lentner 52'	Report	Law 76'

Chorzów, Poland
Attendance: 67,462
Referee: Sergey Alimov (Soviet Union)

27 May 1965

Finland	1–2	Scotland
Hyvärinen 5'	Report	Wilson 37'; Greig 50'

Helsinki, Finland
Attendance: 20,162
Referee: Erwin Vetter (East Germany)

23 June 1965

Finland	0–2	Italy
	Report	Mazzola 33', 78'

Helsinki, Finland
Attendance: 19,995
Referee: Tofiq Bahramov (Soviet Union)

26 September 1965

Finland	2–0	Poland
Peltonen 1'; Nuoranen 27'	Report

Helsinki, Finland
Attendance: 7,859
Referee: Hans Granlund (Norway)

13 October 1965

Scotland	1–2	Poland
McNeill 13'	Report	Pol 85'; Sadek 86'

Glasgow, Scotland
Attendance: 107,508
Referee: Hans Carlsson (Sweden)

24 October 1965

Poland	7–0	Finland
Lubański 19', 21', 24', 41'; Pol 29' (pen.); Sadek 35', 79'	Report

Szczecin, Poland
Attendance: 30,500
Referee: Alojz Obtulovič (Czechoslovakia)

1 November 1965

Italy	6–1	Poland
Mazzola 5'; Barison 25', 65', 87'; Rivera 71'; Mora 79'	Report	Lubański 84'

Rome, Italy
Attendance: 63,614
Referee: Abraham Klein (Israel)

9 November 1965

Scotland	1–0	Italy
Greig 88'	Report

Glasgow, Scotland
Attendance: 100,393
Referee: Rudolf Kreitlein (West Germany)

7 December 1965

Italy	3–0	Scotland
Pascutti 38'; Facchetti 73'; Mora 89'	Report

Naples, Italy
Attendance: 68,873
Referee: István Zsolt (Hungary)
