= 1966 FIFA World Cup qualification – UEFA Group 3 =

Football tournament

The four teams in this group played against each other on a home-and-away basis. The winner (France) qualified for the 1966 FIFA World Cup in England.

== Standings ==
Pos	Team	Pld	W	D	L	GF	GA	GD	Pts	Qualification	(France national football team)	(Norway national football team)	(Yugoslavia national football team)	(Luxembourg national football team)
1	France	6	5	0	1	9	2	+7	10	Qualification for 1966 FIFA World Cup	—	1–0	1–0	4–1
2	Norway	6	3	1	2	10	5	+5	7		0–1	—	3–0	4–2
3	Yugoslavia	6	3	1	2	10	8	+2	7		1–0	1–1	—	3–1
4	Luxembourg	6	0	0	6	6	20	−14	0		0–2	0–2	2–5	—

Source: AllWorldCup
Rules for classification: Tiebreakers

== Matches ==
29 September 1964

Yugoslavia	3–1	Luxembourg
Kovačević 15'; Jerković 25'; Galić 86'	Report	Schmit 71'

Belgrade, Yugoslavia
Attendance: 22,166
Referee: Petros Tsouvaras (Greece)

4 October 1964

Luxembourg	0–2	France
	Report	Guy 17'; Artelesa 80'

Luxembourg, Luxembourg
Attendance: 17,536
Referee: Vital Loraux (Belgium)

8 November 1964

Luxembourg	0–2	Norway
	Report	E. Johansen 28'; Berg 72'

Luxembourg, Luxembourg
Attendance: 8,130
Referee: Geoff Powell (Wales)

11 November 1964

France	1–0	Norway
Rambert 17'	Report

Paris, France
Attendance: 33,517
Referee: Jack Adair (Northern Ireland)

18 April 1965

Yugoslavia	1–0	France
Galić 59'	Report

Belgrade, Yugoslavia
Attendance: 23,906
Referee: Taki Wlachojanis (Austria)

27 May 1965

Norway	4–2	Luxembourg
Pedersen 16'; E. Johansen 61'; Sjøberg 66'; Kristoffersen 77'	Report	Brenner 10' (pen.); Dublin 26'

Trondheim, Norway
Attendance: 22,166
Referee: Martti Hirviniemi (Finland)

16 June 1965

Norway	3–0	Yugoslavia
Seemann 9'; Nilsen 60'; Berg 87'	Report

Oslo, Norway
Attendance: 29,038
Referee: Jack Lowry (Wales)

15 September 1965

Norway	0–1	France
	Report	Combin 22'

Oslo, Norway
Attendance: 21,234
Referee: Hugh Phillips (Scotland)

19 September 1965

Luxembourg	2–5	Yugoslavia
Pilot 39', 50'	Report	Galić 3', 11'; Džajić 37', 58'; Mušović 42'

Luxembourg, Luxembourg
Attendance: 10,780
Referee: Zdeněk Valeš (Czechoslovakia)

9 October 1965

France	1–0	Yugoslavia
Gondet 77'	Report

Paris, France
Attendance: 36,546
Referee: Carl W. Hansen (Denmark)

6 November 1965

France	4–1	Luxembourg
Gondet 8', 27'; Combin 11', 38'	Report	Pilot 53'

Marseille, France
Attendance: 30,000
Referee: Daniel Zariquiegui Izco (Spain)

7 November 1965

Yugoslavia	1–1	Norway
Vasović 23'	Report	Stavrum 8'

Belgrade, Yugoslavia
Attendance: 17,538
Referee: Menachem Ashkenazi (Israel)
