= 1965–66 in Belgian football =

Football in Belgium
- Season: 1965–66

The 1965–66 season was the 63rd season of competitive football in Belgium. RSC Anderlechtois won their 12th Division I title and became the club with the most championship wins in Belgium. They also entered the 1965–66 European Champion Clubs' Cup as Belgian title holder. As RSC Anderlechtois was also the Cup holder, the losing finalist Standard Liège entered the 1965–66 European Cup Winners' Cup. RFC Liégeois, R Daring Club de Bruxelles and R Antwerp FC all played the 1965–66 Inter-Cities Fairs Cup. Standard Liège won the Belgian Cup final against rivals RSC Anderlechtois (1-0). The Belgium national football team ended their 1966 FIFA World Cup qualification campaign with pain, and a defeat to Bulgaria in a play-off game for the World Cup finals qualification (2-1 in Florence, Italy).

== Overview ==
At the end of the 1966 FIFA World Cup qualification group 1, Bulgaria and Belgium were both leader of the group ahead of Israel with 6 points each. Although Belgium had a better goal difference, a play-off game was played on a neutral ground (in Florence, Italy) to decide the World Cup qualifier from Group 1. Belgium lost the game 2-1 and so Bulgaria qualified for the World Cup finals in England.

At the end of the season, R Berchem Sport and RCS Brugeois were relegated to Division II and were replaced by KSV Waregem and R Charleroi SC from Division II.
Charleroi were promoted after winning a play-off game 2-0 against K Waterschei SV Thor Genk, after both teams finished the season in 2nd place with 37 points.
The bottom 2 clubs in Division II (RCS Verviétois and KFC Turnhout) were relegated to Division III, to be replaced by KRC Mechelen and SK Beveren-Waas from Division III.
The bottom club of each Division III league (RU Hutoise FC, VV Verbroedering Maasmechelen, RCS Schaerbeek and RFC La Rhodienne) were relegated to the Promotion, to be replaced by RAA Louviéroise, KSC Hasselt, KFC Brasschaat, Voorwaarts Tienen and KSC Eendracht Aalst from Promotion.

== National team ==
| Date | Venue | Opponents | Score* | Comp | Belgium scorers |
|---|---|---|---|---|---|
| September 26, 1965 | Slavia Stadium, Sofia (A) | Bulgaria | 0-3 | WCQ |
| October 27, 1965 | Stade Emile Versé, Brussels (H) | Bulgaria | 5-0 | WCQ | Paul Van Himst (2), Johnny Thio (2), Jacques Stockman |
| November 10, 1965 | Ramat Gan Stadium, Ramat Gan (A) | Israel | 5-0 | WCQ | Paul Van Himst (3), Johnny Thio, Wilfried Puis |
| December 29, 1965 | Stadio Comunale, Florence (N) | Bulgaria | 1-2 | WCQ | Aleksandar Shalamanov (o.g.) |
| April 17, 1966 | Feijenoord Stadion, Rotterdam (A) | The Netherlands | 1-3 | F | Lucien Spronck |
| April 20, 1966 | Parc des Princes, Paris (A) | France | 3-0 | F | Raoul Lambert, Jacques Stockman, Johnny Thio |
| May 22, 1966 | Heysel Stadium, Brussels (H) | Soviet Union | 0-1 | F |
| May 25, 1966 | Stade de Sclessin, Liège (H) | Republic of Ireland | 2-3 | F | Paul Van Himst, Godfried Vandenboer |

* Belgium score given first

Key

- H = Home match
- A = Away match
- N = On neutral ground
- F = Friendly
- WCQ = World Cup qualification
- o.g. = own goal

== European competitions ==
RSC Anderlechtois advanced to the First Round of the 1965–66 European Champion Clubs' Cup by beating Fenerbahçe of Turkey (drew 0-0 away, won 5-1 at home).
In the First Round, they beat Derry City of Northern Ireland, who withdrew after Anderlecht won the first leg 9-0 in Brussels.
In the Quarter Finals, RSC Anderlechtois lost to Real Madrid of Spain in spite of a 1-0 home win (the Spaniards won the second leg 4-2, and would eventually win their 6th European Cup trophy).

Standard Liège defeated Cardiff City of Wales in the First Round of the 1965–66 European Cup Winners' Cup (won 2-1 away, 1-0 at home), but lost in the Second Round to Liverpool FC (lost 1-3 away, 1-2 at home).

Three Belgian clubs entered the 1965–66 Inter-Cities Fairs Cup: R Antwerp FC beat Glentoran FC of Northern Ireland (won 1-0 at home, draw 3-3 away), while RFC Liégeois lost to NK Zagreb of Yugoslavia (won 1-0 at home, lost 0-2 away), and R Daring Club de Bruxelles lost to AIK Fotboll of Sweden (lost 1-3 at home, drew 0-0 away).
In the second round, Antwerp lost to FC Barcelona of Spain (won 2-1 at home, lost 0-2 away).

== Honours ==
| Competition | Winner |
|---|---|
| Division I | RSC Anderlechtois |
| Cup | Standard Liège |
| Division II | KSV Waregem |
| Division III | KRC Mechelen and SK Beveren-Waas |
| Promotion | RAA Louviéroise, KSC Hasselt, KFC Brasschaat, Voorwaarts Tienen and KSC Eendracht Aalst |

== Final league tables ==
=== Premier Division ===
- 1965-66 Top scorer: Paul Van Himst (RSC Anderlechtois) with 25 goals
- 1965 Golden Shoe: Paul Van Himst (RSC Anderlechtois)
