= 1966 FIFA World Cup qualification – UEFA Group 6 =

Football tournament

The three teams in this group played against each other on a home-and-away basis. The winner Hungary qualified for the eighth FIFA World Cup held in England.

== Standings ==
Pos	Team	Pld	W	D	L	GF	GA	GD	Pts	Qualification	(Hungary national football team)	(East Germany national football team)	(Austria national football team)
1	Hungary	4	3	1	0	8	3	+5	7	Qualification for 1966 FIFA World Cup	—	3–2	3–0
2	East Germany	4	1	2	1	5	5	0	4		1–1	—	1–0
3	Austria	4	0	1	3	1	6	−5	1		1–1	0–1	—

Source: AllWorldCup
Rules for classification: Tiebreakers

== Matches ==
25 April 1965

Austria	1–1	East Germany
Hof 46'	Report	Nöldner 74'

Praterstadion, Vienna, Austria
Attendance: 57,312
Referee: Nicolae Mihăilescu (Romania)

23 May 1965

East Germany	1–1	Hungary
Vogel 17'	Report	Bene 28'

Zentralstadion, Leipzig, East Germany
Attendance: 98,765
Referee: Erik Johansson (Sweden)

13 June 1965

Austria	0–1	Hungary
	Report	Fenyvesi 44'

Praterstadion, Vienna, Austria
Attendance: 70,067
Referee: Pierre Schwinte (France)

5 September 1965

Hungary	3–0	Austria
Farkas 4'; Fenyvesi 35'; Mészöly 70' (pen.)	Report

Népstadion, Budapest, Hungary
Attendance: 71,950
Referee: Antoni Gorączniak (Poland)

9 October 1965

Hungary	3–2	East Germany
Rákosi 41'; Novák 53'; Farkas 80'	Report	P. Ducke 31', 71'

Népstadion, Budapest, Hungary
Attendance: 73,153
Referee: Kestutis Andziulis (Soviet Union)

31 October 1965

East Germany	1–0	Austria
Nöldner 1'	Report

Zentralstadion, Leipzig, East Germany
Attendance: 86,584
Referee: Sam Carswell (Northern Ireland)
