= Danny Muller =

Dutch footballer

Personal information
- Full name: Daniël Muller
- Date of birth: 11 August 1969 (age 57)
- Place of birth: Amsterdam, Netherlands
- Height: 1.69 m (5 ft 6 1/2 in)
- Position: Midfielder

Youth career
- Ajax

Senior career*
| Years | Team | Apps | (Gls) |
| 1988–1989 | Barcelona B | 28 | (2) |
| 1989–1990 | Ajax | 0 | (0) |
| 1990–1992 | Standard Liège | 7 | (0) |
| 1992–1993 | Boom | 15 | (4) |
| 1993–1994 | AZ | 31 | (4) |
| 1994–1997 | RKC | 75 | (13) |
| 1997–1998 | Antwerp | 5 | (1) |
| 1998–2000 | Cambuur | 12 | (2) |
| Total | | 173 | (25) |
- * Club domestic league appearances and goals

Daniël Muller (born 11 August 1969) is a Dutch former footballer who played as a midfielder.

During a 12-year professional career he amassed Eredivisie totals of 118 games and 18 goals, over the course of six seasons. He also played in Spain and Belgium.

== Football career ==
Born in Amsterdam, Muller played youth football with local AFC Ajax, making his senior debuts with FC Barcelona's reserves in Segunda División. During his spell in Spain, first-team manager Johan Cruyff was often accused of having purchased the player mainly because he was the fiancé of his daughter Chantal; the 1988–89 season – his only with the Catalans – ended in relegation for the B's.

Released by Barça Muller return to his homeland and Ajax, playing no games during his only campaign. He then moved to neighbouring Belgium where he spent the next three years, in representation of Standard Liège and K. Boom FC.

Muller's most solid years were 1993–97, when he played an average of 26 league matches with AZ (one season) and RKC Waalwijk (three), always in his country's top level. He spent most of his career nursing chronic achilles tendon problems and hardly received any playing time for his final two clubs, Royal Antwerp F.C. and SC Cambuur, retiring from professional football in 2000 at the age of only 30.

== Personal life ==
Muller's father, Bennie, was also a footballer and a midfielder. He played his entire career with Ajax.
