= 1966 FIFA World Cup qualification – UEFA Group 2 =

Football tournament

The three teams in this group played against each other on a home-and-away basis. The winner West Germany qualified for the eighth FIFA World Cup held in England.

== Standings ==
Pos	Team	Pld	W	D	L	GF	GA	GD	Pts	Qualification	(Germany national football team)	(Sweden men's national football team)	(Cyprus national football team)
1	West Germany	4	3	1	0	14	2	+12	7	Qualification for 1966 FIFA World Cup	—	1–1	5–0
2	Sweden	4	2	1	1	10	3	+7	5		1–2	—	3–0
3	Cyprus	4	0	0	4	0	19	−19	0		0–6	0–5	—

Source: AllWorldCup
Rules for classification: Tiebreakers

== Matches ==
4 November 1964

West Germany	1–1	Sweden
Brunnenmeier 24'	Report	Hamrin 86'

West Berlin
Attendance: 74,000
Referee: Gottfried Dienst (Switzerland)

24 April 1965

West Germany	5–0	Cyprus
Sieloff 16' (pen.), 35'; Overath 22', 85'; Strehl 69'	Report

Karlsruhe, West Germany
Attendance: 39,675
Referee: Norman Mootz (Luxembourg)

5 May 1965

Sweden	3–0	Cyprus
Simonsson 25', 73'; Jonsson 55'	Report

Norrköping, Sweden
Attendance: 15,796
Referee: Magnús Petursson (Iceland)

26 September 1965

Sweden	1–2	West Germany
Jonsson 44'	Report	Krämer 45'; Seeler 54'

Stockholm, Sweden
Attendance: 52,943
Referee: Ken Dagnall (England)

7 November 1965

Cyprus	0–5	Sweden
	Report	Granström 24', 25'; Kindvall 37'; B. Larsson 40', 87'

Famagusta, Cyprus
Attendance: 2,716
Referee: Gyula Zsengellér (Hungary)

14 November 1965

Cyprus	0–6	West Germany
	Report	Heiß 30'; Krämer 32'; Szymaniak 57'; Brunnenmeier 82', 88'; Panayiotou 87' (o.g.)

Nicosia, Cyprus
Attendance: 3,412
Referee: Francesco Francescon (Italy)
