= 1966 FIFA World Cup qualification – UEFA Group 9 =

Football tournament

This group originally included Syria as well as Spain and the Republic of Ireland. However Syria withdrew in support of the African teams who withdrew in protest at the allocation of spots. The Republic of Ireland and Spain subsequently played against each other on a home-and-away basis. When both teams won their home match, a play-off on neutral ground was played to decide who would qualify. This match was initially to be played in London, a city with a large Irish immigrant population, but the Royal Spanish Football Federation and the Football Association of Ireland later came to an agreement and moved the match to Paris. Spain won the play-off and qualified for the 1966 FIFA World Cup.

== Standings ==
Pos	Team	Pld	W	D	L	GF	GA	GD	Pts	Qualification	(Spain national football team)	(Republic of Ireland national football team)	(Syria national football team)
1=	Spain	2	1	0	1	4	2	+2	2	Qualification for play-off	—	4–1	Canc.
1=	Republic of Ireland	2	1	0	1	2	4	−2	2	Qualification for play-off	1–0	—	Canc.
—	Syria	0	0	0	0	0	0	0	0		Canc.	Canc.	—

Source: AllWorldCup
Rules for classification: Tiebreakers

== Matches ==
Syria withdrew to support the African teams who had withdrawn in protest at the allocation of spots.

5 May 1965

Republic of Ireland	1–0	Spain
Iribar 61' (o.g.)	Report

Dalymount Park, Dublin, Republic of Ireland
Attendance: 40,772
Referee: Leo Callaghan (Wales)

27 October 1965

Spain	4–1	Republic of Ireland
Pereda 40', 43', 58'; Lapetra 63'	Report	McEvoy 26'

Estadio Ramón Sánchez Pizjuán, Seville, Spain
Attendance: 29,452
Referee: Décio de Freitas (Portugal)

=== Play-off ===
Republic of Ireland and Spain finished level on points, and a play-off on neutral ground was played to decide who would qualify. This match was initially to be played in London, a city with a large Irish immigrant population, but the Spanish and Irish football associations later came to an agreement and moved the match to Paris.

10 November 1965

Spain	1–0	Republic of Ireland
Ufarte 80'	Report

Parc des Princes, Paris, France
Attendance: 35,731
Referee: Pierre Schwinte (France)
