= Guy Delhasse =

Belgian footballer (1933–2025)

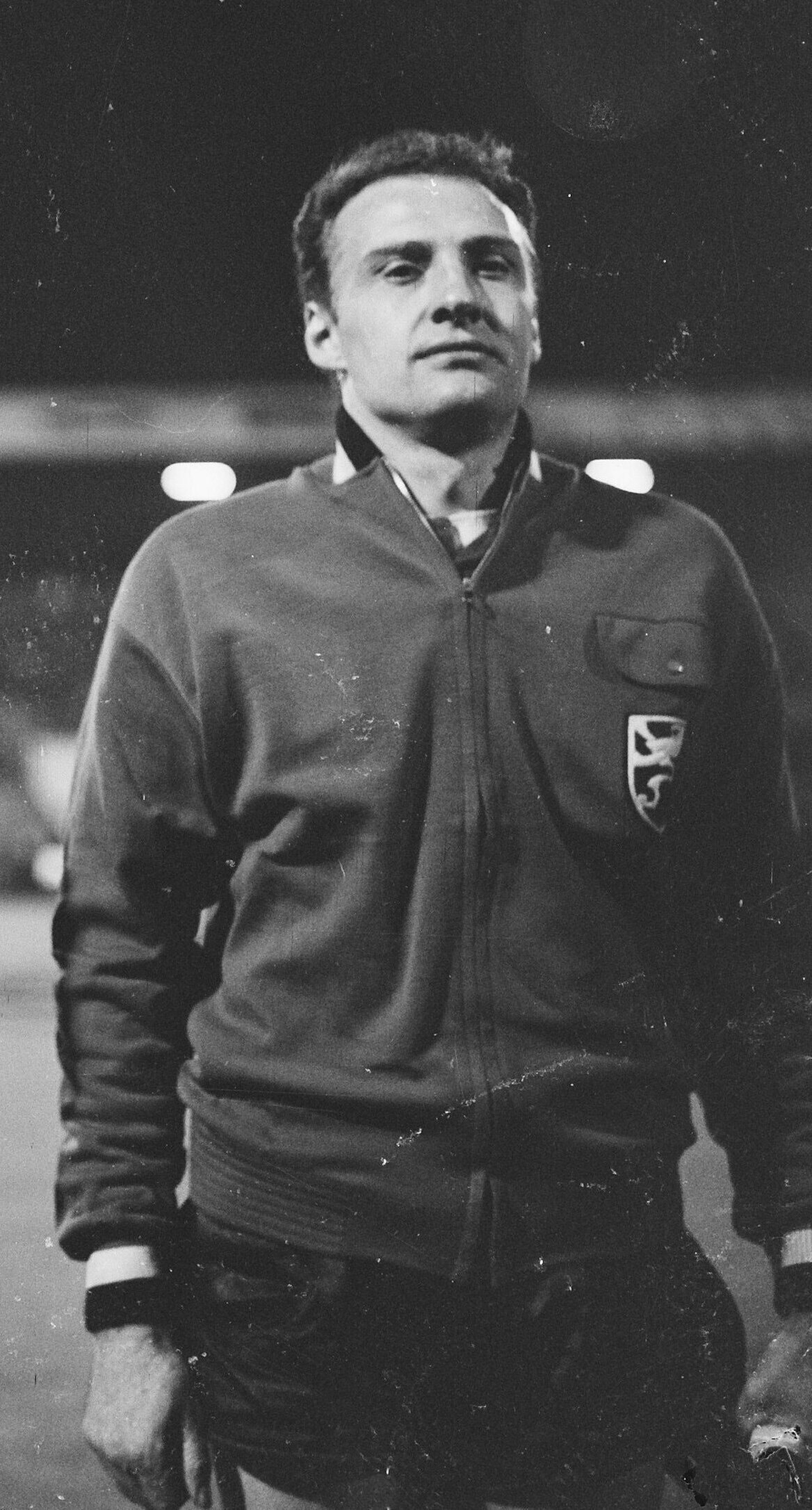
- Delhasse at the 1964 Summer Olympics

Personal information
- Date of birth: 19 February 1933
- Date of death: 27 January 2025 (aged 91)
- Position: Goalkeeper

Senior career*
Years	Team	Apps	(Gls)
1952–1967	RFC Liège		
1967–1969	Beringen		

International career
1961–1965	Belgium	7	(0)
- * Club domestic league appearances and goals

Guy Delhasse (19 February 1933 – 27 January 2025) was a Belgian footballer who played as a goalkeeper for RFC Liège and Beringen. He made seven appearances for the Belgium national team from 1961 to 1965. Delhasse died on 27 January 2025, at the age of 91.
