= Lucien Spronck =

Belgian footballer

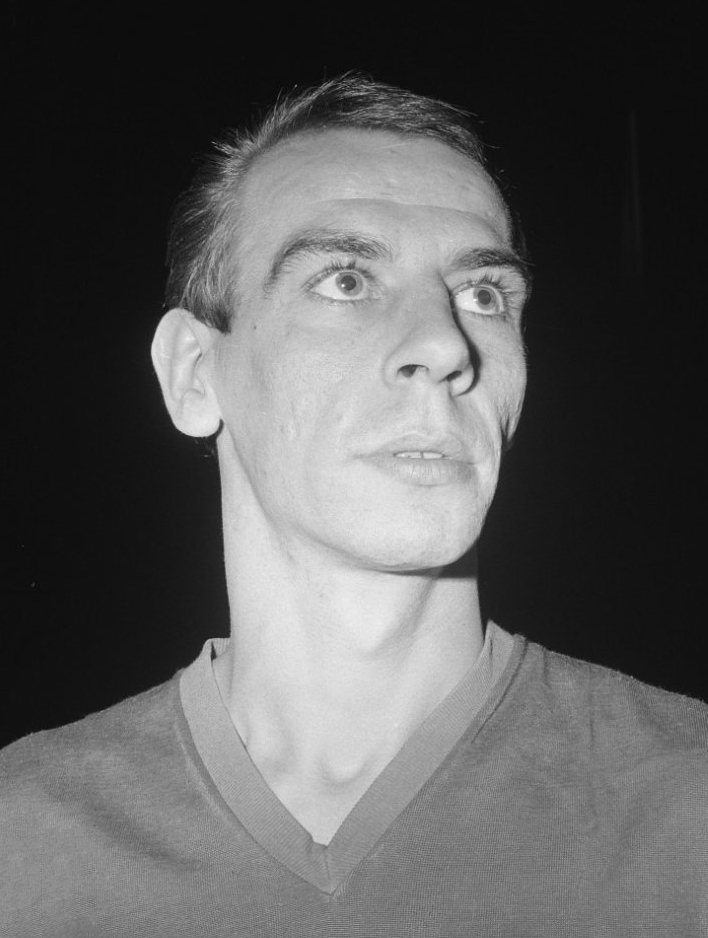

Personal information
- Date of birth: 19 August 1939
- Date of death: 19 December 1989 (aged 50)

International career
Years	Team	Apps	(Gls)
1962–1966	Belgium	3	(1)

Lucien Spronck (19 August 1939 – 19 December 1989) was a Belgian footballer. He played in three matches for the Belgium national football team from 1962 to 1966.
