= 1966 FIFA World Cup qualification – UEFA Group 1 =

Football tournament

The three teams in this group played against each other on a home-and-away basis. Belgium and Bulgaria finished level on points, a play-off on neutral ground was played to decide who would qualify. The winner (Bulgaria) qualified for the eighth FIFA World Cup held in England.

== Standings ==
Pos	Team	Pld	W	D	L	GF	GA	GD	Pts	Qualification	(Bulgaria national football team)	(Belgium national football team)	(Israel national football team)
1=	Bulgaria	4	3	0	1	9	6	+3	6	Qualification for play-off	—	3–0	4–0
1=	Belgium	4	3	0	1	11	3	+8	6	Qualification for play-off	5–0	—	1–0
3	Israel	4	0	0	4	1	12	−11	0		1–2	0–5	—

Source: AllWorldCup
Rules for classification: Tiebreakers

== Matches ==
9 May 1965

Belgium	1–0	Israel
Jurion 24' (pen.)	Report

Heysel Stadium, Brussels, Belgium
Attendance: 21,699
Referee: Einar Poulsen (Denmark)

13 June 1965

Bulgaria	4–0	Israel
Kotkov 16', 39'; Asparuhov 67'; Kitov 69'	Report

Slavia Stadium, Sofia, Bulgaria
Attendance: 18,770
Referee: Faruk Talu (Turkey)

26 September 1965

Bulgaria	3–0	Belgium
Kotkov 30', 60'; Asparuhov 34'	Report

Slavia Stadium, Sofia, Bulgaria
Attendance: 25,380
Referee: Konstantin Zečevič (Yugoslavia)

27 October 1965

Belgium	5–0	Bulgaria
Van Himst 18', 55'; Thio 75', 80'; Stockman 89'	Report

Constant Vanden Stock Stadium, Brussels, Belgium
Attendance: 13,780
Referee: Marcel Albert Bois (France)

10 November 1965

Israel	0–5	Belgium
	Report	Van Himst 24', 33', 69'; Thio 31'; Puis 48'

Ramat Gan Stadium, Ramat Gan, Israel
Attendance: 48,355
Referee: Antonio Sbardella (Italy)

21 November 1965

Israel	1–2	Bulgaria
Talbi 48'	Report	Kolev 31'; Asparuhov 81'

Ramat Gan Stadium, Ramat Gan, Israel
Attendance: 28,213
Referee: Eduard Babauczek (Austria)

=== Play-off ===
Because Belgium and Bulgaria finished level on points, a play-off on neutral ground was played to decide who would qualify.

29 December 1965

Bulgaria	2–1	Belgium
Asparuhov 18', 19'	Report	Vutsov 75' (o.g.)

Stadio Comunale, Florence, Italy
Attendance: 11,659
Referee: Antonio Sbardella (Italy)
