= Werner Krämer =

German footballer

Personal information
- Full name: Werner Krämer
- Date of birth: 23 January 1940
- Place of birth: Duisburg, Germany
- Date of death: 12 February 2010 (aged 70)
- Place of death: Duisburg, Germany
- Height: 1.73 m (5 ft 8 in)
- Position: Midfielder

Youth career
- 1946–1947: DJK Lösort Meiderich
- 1947–1958: Meidericher SV

Senior career*
Years	Team	Apps	(Gls)
1958–1967	Meidericher SV / MSV Duisburg (Note: During the 1966–67 season, Bundesliga outfit Meidericher SV was renamed MSV Duisburg)	236	(65)
1967–1969	Hamburger SV	47	(9)
1969–1973	VfL Bochum	102	(12)
Total		365	(86)

International career
1963–1967	West Germany	13	(3)
1965	West Germany B	1	(1)
Medal record
Men's football
Representing West Germany
FIFA World Cup
Runner-up	1966 England
- * Club domestic league appearances and goals

Werner Krämer (23 January 1940 – 12 February 2010) was a German football player, who was a household name to the West German football audience under his nickname Eia Krämer. He was born in Duisburg, Germany.

== Club career ==
He scored 49 goals in 192 Bundesliga matches.

== International career ==
Krämer won 13 caps for West Germany in the 1960s.

== Career statistics ==
=== Club ===
Club performance			League		Cup		Continental		Total	
Season	Club	League	Apps	Goals	Apps	Goals	Apps	Goals	Apps	Goals
West Germany			League		DFB-Pokal		Europe		Total	
1958–59	Meidericher SV	Oberliga West	5	1	—		—		5	1
1959–60	Meidericher SV	Oberliga West	20	3	—		—		20	3
1960–61	Meidericher SV	Oberliga West	29	6	—		—		29	6
1961–62	Meidericher SV	Oberliga West	29	7	—		—		29	7
1962–63	Meidericher SV	Oberliga West	28	11	—		—		28	11
1963–64	Meidericher SV	Bundesliga	21	11	0	0	—		21	11
1964–65	Meidericher SV	Bundesliga	27	8	1	0	—		28	8
1965–66	Meidericher SV	Bundesliga	29	13	4	1	—		33	14
1966–67	MSV Duisburg	Bundesliga	28	5	1	0	—		29	5
1967–68	Hamburger SV	Bundesliga	30	7	0	0	9	1	39	8
1968–69	Hamburger SV	Bundesliga	17	2	2	0	6	4	25	6
1969–70	VfL Bochum	Regionalliga West	33	4	—		—		33	4
1970–71	VfL Bochum	Regionalliga West	30	5	—		—		30	5
1971–72	VfL Bochum	Bundesliga	28	2	2	0	—		30	2
1972–73	VfL Bochum	Bundesliga	11	1	0	0	—		11	1
Career total			365	86	10	1	15	5	390	92

Scores and results list West Germany's goal tally first.

International goals
#	Date	Venue	Opponent	Score	Result	Competition
1.	29 December 1963	Stade Mohamed V, Casablanca, Morocco	Morocco	3–1	4–1	Friendly
2.	26 September 1965	Olympic Stadium, Stockholm, Sweden	Sweden	1–1	2–1	FIFA World Cup 1966 qualifying
3.	14 November 1965	GSP Stadium, Nicosia, Cyprus	Cyprus	2–0	6–0	FIFA World Cup 1966 qualifying
