= Bennie Muller =

Dutch footballer (1938–2024)

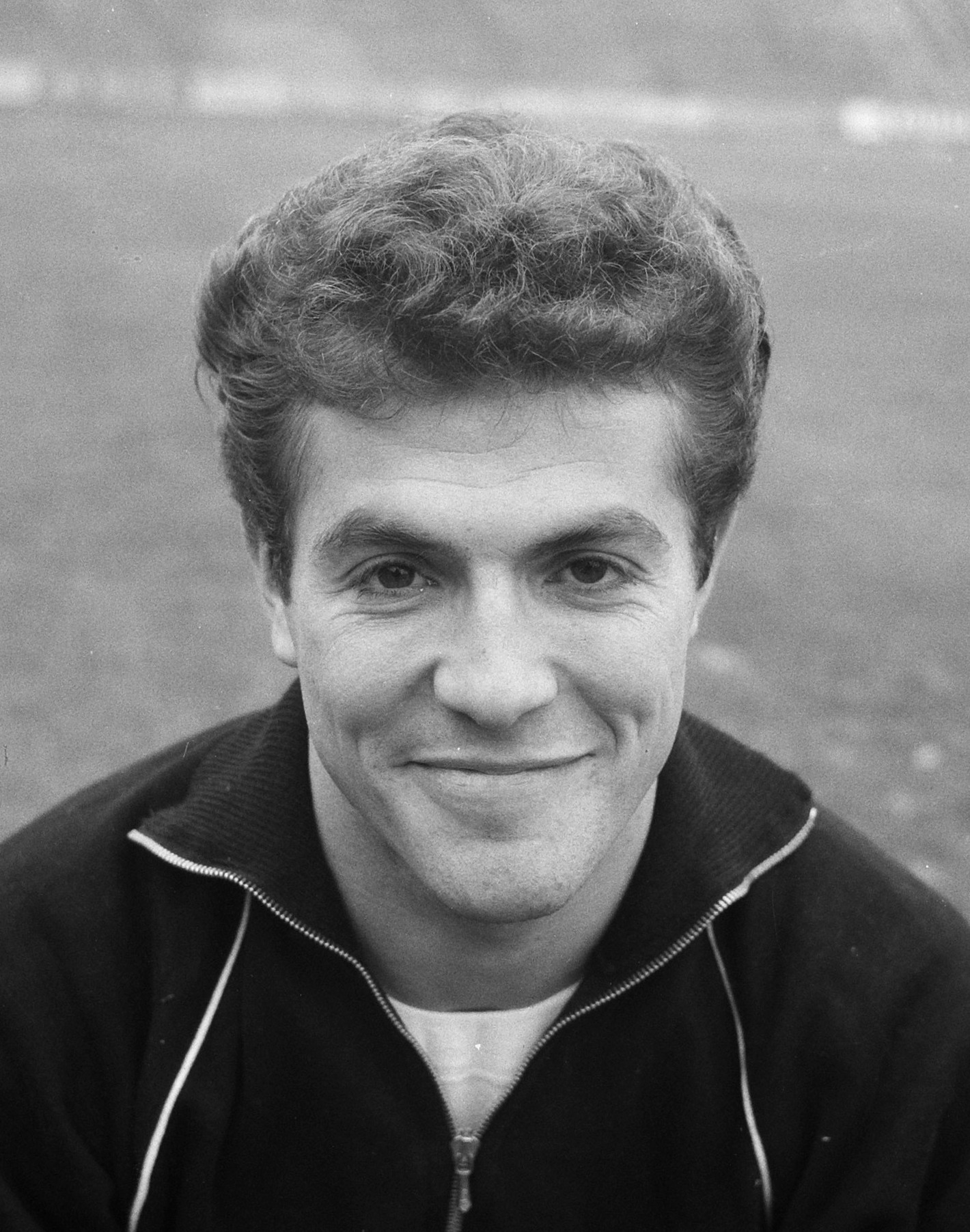
- Muller in 1961

Personal information
- Date of birth: 14 August 1938
- Place of birth: Amsterdam, Netherlands
- Date of death: 17 January 2024 (aged 85)
- Position: Midfielder

Senior career*
Years	Team	Apps	(Gls)
1958–1970	Ajax	341	(31)
1970–1971	Holland Sport	24	(0)
1971–1972	Blauw-Wit		
Total		365	(31)

International career
1960–1968	Netherlands	43	(2)
- * Club domestic league appearances and goals

Bernardus "Bennie" Muller (14 August 1938 – 17 January 2024) was a Dutch professional footballer who played as a midfielder for Ajax, Holland Sport, and the Netherlands national team.

== Early life ==
Muller was born in the Jewish Quarter of Amsterdam-East. His grandfather was a fruit seller named Levi Sluiter. His mother was incarcerated in Westerbork transit camp during World War II. Approximately 200 members of Muller's extended family were killed in the Holocaust.

== Club career ==
Muller played club football for Ajax beginning in 1958, and was its captain. He made his debut for Ajax against MVV and played 426 official matches for the club. He won five league titles and three domestic cups with them.

== International career ==
Muller made his debut for the Netherlands national team in an April 1960 friendly match against Bulgaria, earning 43 caps in total, and also serving as captain. His final international was an October 1968 World Cup qualification match against Bulgaria.

== Personal life ==
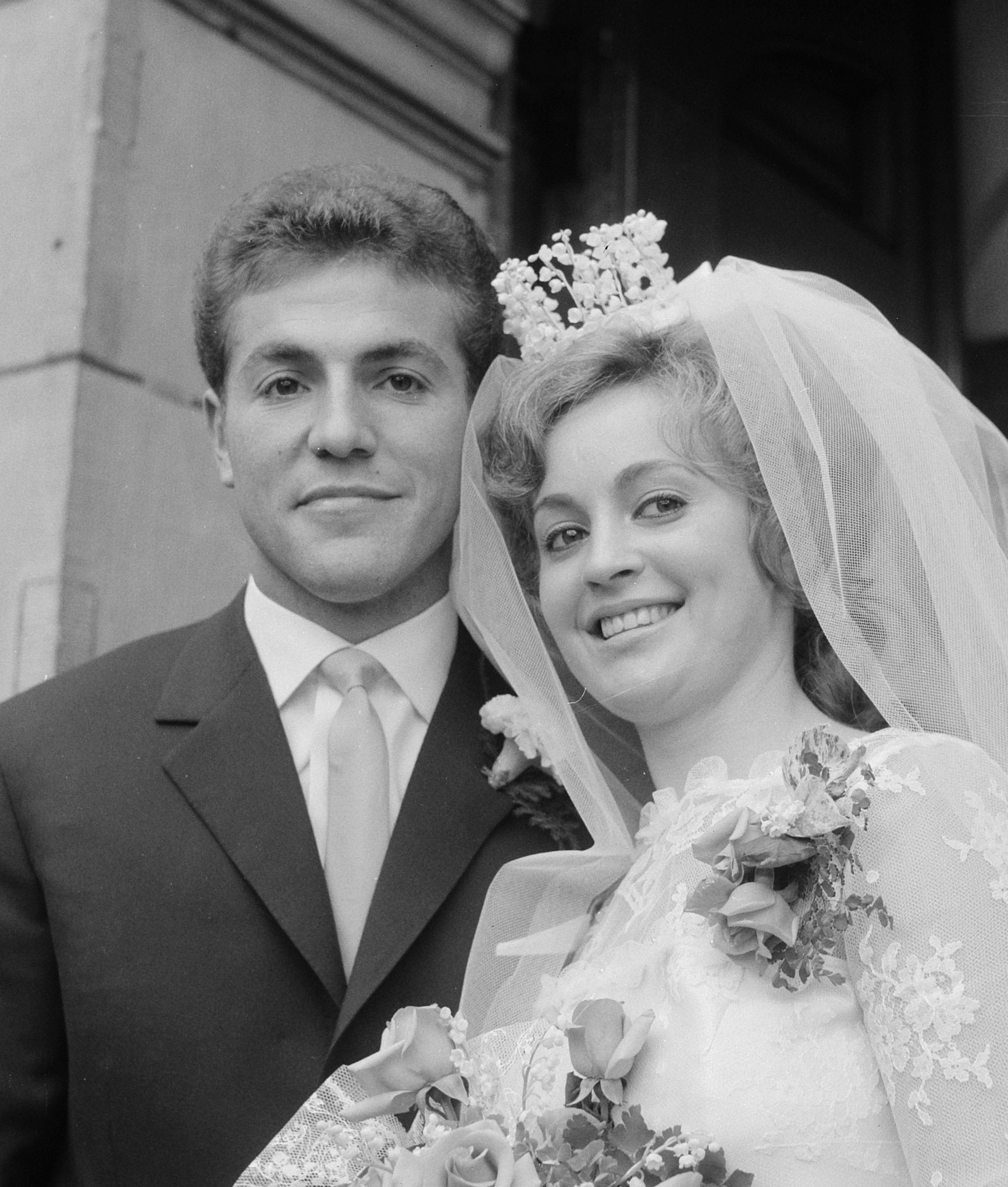
Muller getting married on 27 September 1961

Muller was Jewish.

Muller married his girlfriend Nellie on 27 September 1961. He had a daughter, Petra, and a son Danny, who was also a professional footballer. Muller later owned a cigar shop near Amsterdam Centraal station.

Bennie Muller died on 17 January 2024, at the age of 85.

== Career statistics ==
=== International ===
Appearances and goals by national team and year
National team	Year	Apps	Goals
Netherlands	1960	5	0
Netherlands	1961	6	0
Netherlands	1962	6	0
Netherlands	1963	2	0
Netherlands	1964	6	1
Netherlands	1965	3	0
Netherlands	1966	7	1
Netherlands	1967	5	0
Netherlands	1968	3	0
Total		43	2

Scores and results list the Netherlands' goal tally first, score column indicates score after each Muller goal.

List of international goals scored by Bennie Muller
No.	Date	Venue	Opponent	Score	Result	Competition
1	24 May 1964	De Kuip, Rotterdam, Netherlands	Albania	2–0	2–0	1966 FIFA World Cup qualification
2	17 April 1966	De Kuip, Rotterdam, Netherlands	Belgium	3–0	3–1	Friendly

== Honours ==
Ajax

- Eredivisie (5): 1959–60, 1965–66, 1966–67, 1967–68, 1969–70
- KNVB Cup (3): 1960–61, 1966–67, 1969–70; runner-up: 1967–68
- European Cup: runner-up 1969

== See also ==
- List of Jewish footballers
