= Alexander Horváth =

Slovak footballer (1938–2022)

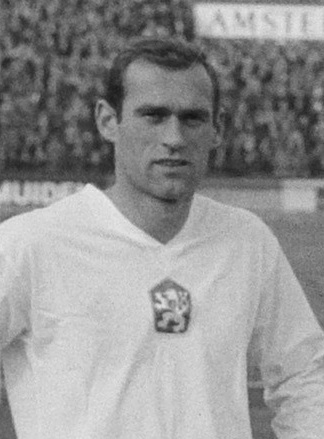
- Horváth in 1966

Personal information
- Date of birth: 28 December 1938
- Place of birth: Mošovce, Czechoslovakia
- Date of death: 31 August 2022 (aged 83)
- Position: Defender

Senior career*
Years	Team	Apps	(Gls)
1958–1962	Dynamo Žilina		
1963–1970	Slovan Bratislava		
1970–1972	R. Daring Club Molenbeek		

International career
1964–1970	Czechoslovakia	26	(3)

Managerial career
- 1977–1979: R.W.D. Molenbeek
- 1987: R.W.D. Molenbeek
- 1988: Sakaryaspor
- 1991–1992: La Louvière
- * Club domestic league appearances and goals

Alexander Horváth (28 December 1938 – 31 August 2022) was a Slovak footballer who played as a defender. He made 26 appearances for the Czechoslovakia scoring 3 goals.

Horváth was a participant at the 1970 FIFA World Cup. He played mostly for Slovan Bratislava and also briefly for R. Daring Club Molenbeek in Belgium, where he emigrated. Horváth coached R.W.D. Molenbeek and Sakaryaspor.
