= Kaj Poulsen =

Danish footballer (born 1942)

Personal information
- Full name: Kaj Kvistgård Poulsen
- Date of birth: 31 December 1942 (age 83)
- Place of birth: Morsø, Denmark
- Position: Striker

Senior career*
Years	Team	Apps	(Gls)
1961–1966	Vejle Boldklub	139	(29)
1966–1968	Hannover 96	52	(4)
1968–1970	K. Beerschot V.A.C.	28	(10)
1970–1973	KFC Turnhout	87	(14)
1973–1974	Vejle Boldklub	2	(0)

International career
1961–1964	Denmark U21	2	(0)
1965–1966	Denmark	5	(1)
- * Club domestic league appearances and goals

Kaj Kvistgård Poulsen, known as Kaj Poulsen, (born 31 December 1942) is a Danish former association footballer in the striker position, who played 141 games and scored 29 goals for Vejle Boldklub. He played five matches for the Denmark national football team, and scored one goal against Wales in a qualification game for the 1966 FIFA World Cup. He was named 1965 Danish Football Player of the Year. Poulsen moved abroad to play professionally with German Bundesliga club Hannover 96 in 1966. He also played for Belgian clubs K. Beerschot V.A.C. and KFC Turnhout, before ending his career with Vejle in 1974.
