= Juhani Peltonen =

Finnish footballer (born 1936)

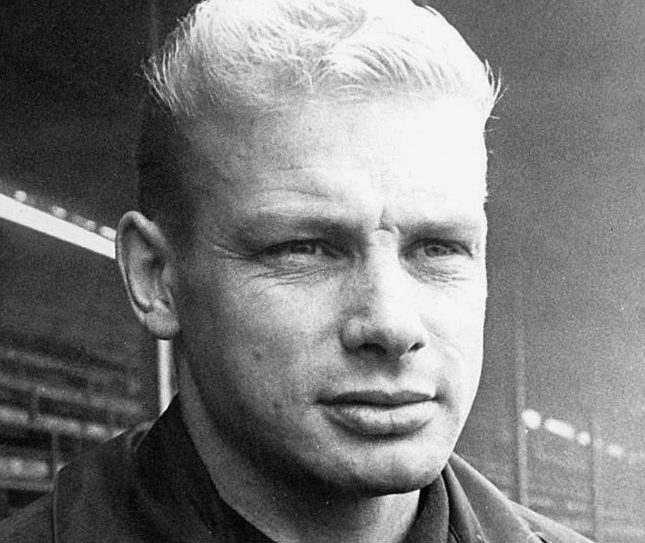

Personal information
- Date of birth: 9 November 1936 (age 89)
- Place of birth: Valkeakoski, Finland
- Height: 1.76 m (5 ft 9 in)
- Position: Forward

Senior career*
| Years | Team | Apps | (Gls) |
| 1954–1964 | Valkeakosken Haka | 209 | (74) |
| 1964–1966 | Hamburger SV | 38 | (6) |
| 1966–1972 | Valkeakosken Haka | 102 | (34) |
| Total | | 349 | (114) |

International career
| 1955–1970 | Finland | 68 | (10) |
- * Club domestic league appearances and goals

Juhani Peltonen (born 16 June 1936) is a retired Finnish association football player.

Peltonen was the first Finnish player to play in the German Bundesliga. The forward made 38 appearances for Hamburger SV between 1964 and 1966, scoring six goals. His career in West Germany ended after only two seasons because of contract disputes.

In Finland Peltonen always represented Valkeakosken Haka, winning two Finnish championships and five Finnish Cups with the club. For the Finnish national team he made 68 appearances, scoring 11 goals. He was chosen Finnish Player of the Year three times.

He was inducted into the Finnish Football Hall of Fame in 1994.

== Career statistics ==
=== International ===
As of 6 November 2015

Finland national team
| Year | Apps | Goals |
|---|---|---|
| 1955 | 6 | 0 |
| 1956 | 6 | 0 |
| 1957 | 7 | 0 |
| 1958 | 2 | 0 |
| 1960 | 5 | 0 |
| 1961 | 2 | 0 |
| 1962 | 3 | 0 |
| 1963 | 2 | 0 |
| 1964 | 5 | 2 |
| 1965 | 5 | 3 |
| 1966 | 4 | 0 |
| 1967 | 7 | 3 |
| 1968 | 2 | 0 |
| 1969 | 2 | 0 |
| 1970 | 3 | 0 |
| Total | 61 | 8 |

=== International goals ===
Scores and results list Finland's goal tally first.

| Goal | Date | Venue | Opponent | Score | Result | Competition |
|---|---|---|---|---|---|---|
| 1. | 7 June 1964 | Olympiastadion, Helsinki, Finland | West Germany | 1–1 | 1–4 | Exhibition game |
| 2. | 6 September 1964 | Olympiastadion, Helsinki, Finland | Denmark | 2–0 | 2–1 | Exhibition game |
| 3. | 21 October 1964 | Hampden Park, Glasgow, Scotland | Scotland | 1–3 | 1–3 | 1966 FIFA World Cup qualification |
| 4. | 4 November 1964 | Stadio Luigi Ferraris, Genoa, Italy | Italy | 1–6 | 1–6 | 1966 FIFA World Cup qualification |
| 5. | 26 September 1965 | Olympiastadion, Helsinki, Finland | Poland | 1–0 | 2–0 | 1966 FIFA World Cup qualification |
| 5. | 10 May 1967 | Olympiastadion, Helsinki, Finland | Greece | 1–0 | 1–1 | UEFA Euro 1968 qualifying |
| 6. | 6 September 1967 | Kupittaan jalkapallostadion, Turku, Finland | Soviet Union | 1–2 | 2–5 | UEFA Euro 1968 qualifying |
| 7. | 24 September 1967 | Praterstadion, Vienna, Austria | Austria | 1–1 | 1–2 | UEFA Euro 1968 qualifying |

== Honours ==
=== Clubs ===
Valkeakosken Haka

- Finnish Championship: 1960, 1962
- Finnish Cup: 1955, 1959, 1960, 1963, 1969

=== Individual ===
- Finnish Footballer of the Year: 1960, 1962, 1964
