= Arne Pedersen =

Norwegian football player and coach (1931–2013)

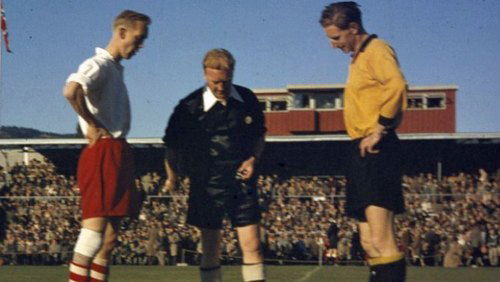
- Pedersen (left) and Thorbjørn Svenssen ahead of the 1957 Norwegian Football Cup Final

Personal information
- Full name: Arne Knut Pedersen
- Date of birth: 1 November 1931
- Place of birth: Fredrikstad, Norway
- Date of death: 16 November 2013 (aged 82)
- Place of death: Fredrikstad, Norway
- Position: Inside forward

Youth career
- 1945–1950: Fredrikstad

Senior career*
Years	Team	Apps	(Gls)
1950–1966	Fredrikstad	231	(107)

International career
1957–1966	Norway	40	(11)

Managerial career
- 1971–1973: Fredrikstad
- * Club domestic league appearances and goals

Arne Knut Pedersen (1 November 1931 – 16 November 2013) was a Norwegian footballer. He was a deep-lying inside forward, or offensive midfielder by today's terminology, who spent his entire playing career at his hometown club Fredrikstad FK, where he was a key player during the club's most successful period in the 1950s and early 1960s. He was also capped 40 times by Norway, and scored 11 international goals.

== Club career ==
Pedersen was born and raised in Fredrikstad, and joined Fredrikstad FK as a youth player in 1945. His older brother Leif Pedersen (1924–1990) also played for the club at the time. Arne Pedersen made his debut for FFK's first team in 1950, and soon became a regular in the side. During his time with the club, Pedersen won six Norwegian league titles and three Norwegian Cup titles, including the double in 1957 and 1961 and that makes him the most successful player in the history of Fredrikstad FK.

In 1960, Pedersen scored one of the goals when Fredrikstad defeated Ajax 4–3 in the European Champions Cup, as well as the return leg in Amsterdam which ended in a goalless draw. In total, Pedersen played 231 matches for Fredrikstad in the Norwegian league, scoring 107 goals, between 1950 and 1966. His final match for the club was the 1966 Cup Final where he scored the winning goal from the penalty spot as FFK defeated Lyn by a score of 3–2. He played a total of 342 matches for Fredrikstad, which is a club record.

== International career ==
Pedersen made his international debut in a 1958 World Cup qualification match against Hungary in November 1957. He scored his first international goal the following year against Finland, but it was not until 1962 that he became a regular in the national side. In June 1963, he scored one of the goals in Norway's surprising 4–3 win against Scotland, and he also played in Norway's shock 3–0 victory against Yugoslavia in a 1965 World Cup qualifier.

== Later life ==
After his retirement as a player in 1966, Pedersen coached several clubs in the Østfold region, including Fredrikstad from 1971 to 1973. He also coached lower-league sides Trosvik, Torp, Tistedalen and Kvik Halden. He died in the early hours of 16 November 2013, at the age of 82.

== Honours ==
- Norwegian Premier League (6): 1951, 1952, 1954, 1957, 1960, 1961
- Norwegian Football Cup (3): 1957, 1961, 1966
