= Frans Geurtsen =

Dutch international footballer (1942–2015)

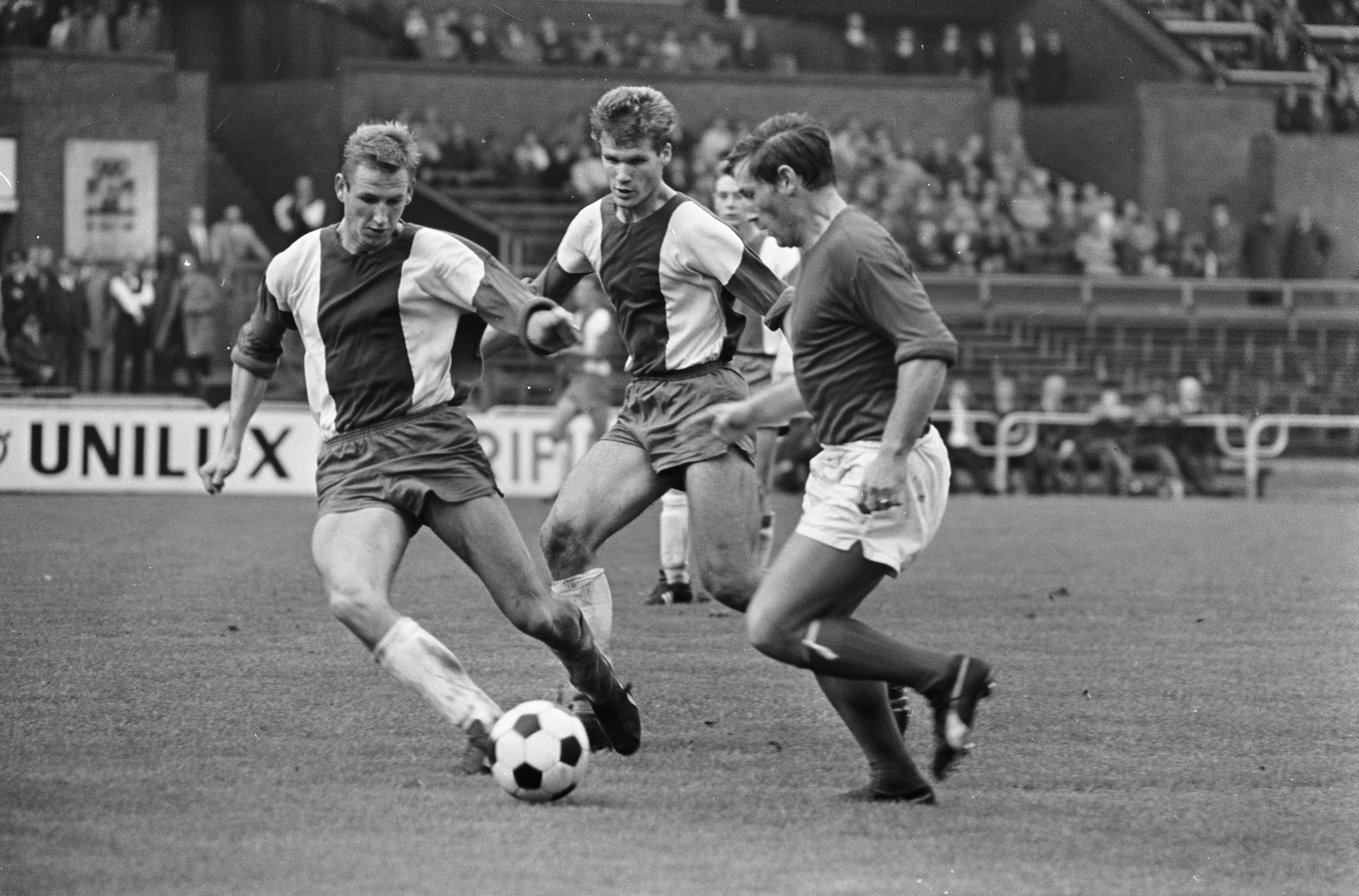
- Frans Geurtsen (right)

Personal information
- Full name: Franciscus Gerardus Geurtsen
- Date of birth: 17 March 1942
- Place of birth: Utrecht, Netherlands
- Date of death: 12 December 2015 (aged 73)
- Place of death: Alkmaar, Netherlands
- Position: Striker

Youth career
- 1953-1959: Velox

Senior career*
Years	Team	Apps	(Gls)
1959–1963	Velox	100	(76)
1963–1971	DWS	185	(99)
Total		285	(175)

International career
1964	Netherlands	1	(1)
- * Club domestic league appearances and goals

Frans Geurtsen (17 March 1942 – 12 December 2015) was a Dutch footballer, who played at both professional and international levels as a striker.

== Club career ==
A prolific striker, Geurtsen started his career at hometown side Velox aged 11, winning promotion with the senior team to the Eerste Divisie in 1962. He played for an Utrecht XI in the 1962–63 Inter-Cities Fairs Cup, scoring twice against Tasmania Berlin. He was signed by Amsterdam club DWS in summer 1963, and was the Eredivisie top scorer in both the 1963–64 and 1964–65 seasons. He won the Eredivisie league title with DWS in 1964 and scored for them in the 1964–65 European Champions Cup.

An Achilles tendon injury cut short his career and he had to retire in 1971 aged only 29.

== International career ==
He made his debut for the Netherlands in an October 1964 FIFA World Cup qualification match against Albania, immediately scoring a goal. It proved to be his final international as well.

=== International goals ===
Scores and results list Bermuda's goal tally first.

N.	Date	Venue	Opponent	Score	Result	Competition
1.	25 October 1964	Qemal Stafa Stadium, Tirana, Albania	Albania	2–0	2–0	1966 FIFA World Cup qualification

== Personal life and death ==
After retiring, Geurtsen worked as a manager at a pharmaceutical manufacturer in Haarlem and coached amateur sides in North Holland. He died in December 2015 in Alkmaar.
