= Mogens Berg =

Danish footballer (born 1944)

Personal information
- Full name: Mogens Berg Pedersen
- Date of birth: 8 June 1944 (age 82)
- Place of birth: Odense, Denmark
- Position: Winger

Senior career*
Years	Team	Apps	(Gls)
19??–1964	B 1909		
1964–1967	Dundee United	48	(8)
1967	Dallas Tornado	10	(2)
1968–19??	B 1909		

International career
1964–1971	Denmark	8	(1)
- * Club domestic league appearances and goals

Mogens Berg (born 8 June 1944) is a Danish former footballer, who played professionally as a winger for Scottish club Dundee United. He played eight games and scored one goal for the Denmark national football team.

== Career ==
Born in Odense, Berg started his career with local club Boldklubben 1909 (B 1909). He helped B 1909 win the 1962 Danish Cup and 1964 Danish football championship trophies, and made his Danish national team debut in November 1964. He debuted under national manager Poul Petersen, and scored a goal as Denmark lost 2–4 to Greece. He played a further two national team games, before he moved abroad to play professionally for Dundee United in December 1964.

Due to the Danish rules of amateurism, Berg's national team career then went on a hiatus. Berg played for Dundee United at Tannadice for more than three years, before returning to play for B 1909 in May 1968. Unfortunately, a back injury impacted his time at United, but still he scored 16 goals in 61 appearances, including a hat-trick against St Johnstone during the clubs run to the final of the 1964 Summer Cup. Dundee United have described Berg as a player who was a "fans favourite" during his time at the club and also as a "club legend". More than 50 years after leaving United, Berg returned to Tannadice in September 2019 and was presented to the club's fans ahead of a home game against Morton. He re-entered the Danish national team in May 1971, as he helped B 1909 win the 1971 Danish Cup. Mogens Berg played five national team games under national manager Rudi Strittich, before his national career ended in June 1971.

== Honours ==
- Danish Cup:
  - Winner (2): 1962, 1971
- Danish Championship:
  - Winner (1): 1964
