= Hennie van Nee =

Dutch footballer

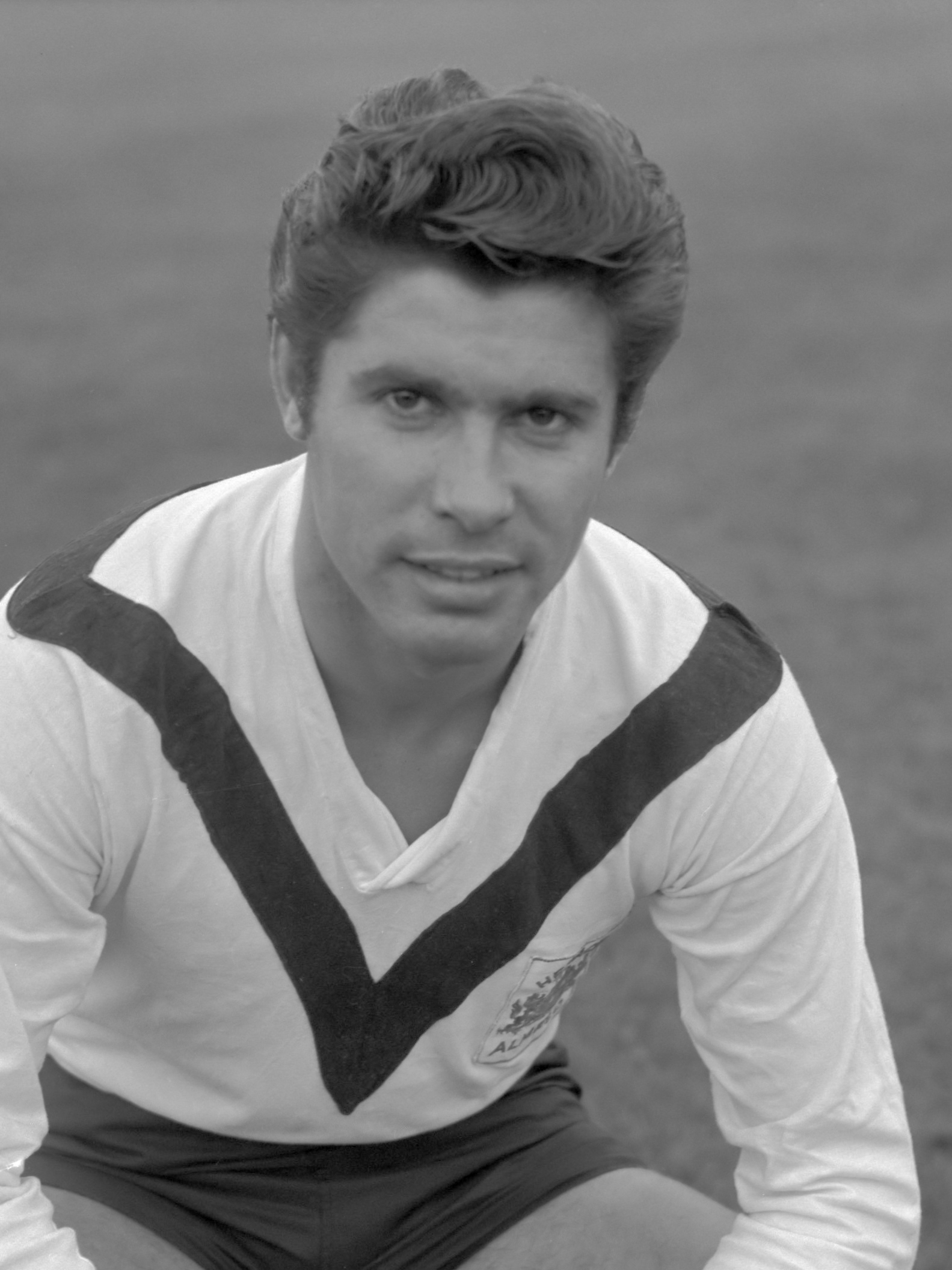
- Van Nee with Heracles Almelo in 1964

Personal information
- Full name: Hennie van Nee
- Date of birth: 13 August 1939
- Place of birth: Zwolle, Netherlands
- Date of death: 25 January 1996 (aged 56)
- Place of death: Bennebroek, Netherlands
- Position: Forward

Senior career*
Years	Team	Apps	(Gls)
1957–1960	Zwolsche Boys	–	(19)
1960–1962	Heracles	–	(30)
1962–1963	PEC Zwolle	–	(15)
1963–1965	Heracles	54	(19)
1965–1966	GVAV	11	(1)
1966–1967	Kickers Offenbach	–	(–)
1967–1969	Gent	–	(–)
1969–1970	Cercle Brugge	21	(5)
1970–1971	Haarlem	7	(3)

International career
1964	Netherlands	5	(2)
- * Club domestic league appearances and goals

Hendrik van Nee (13 August 1939 — 25 January 1996) was a Dutch footballer who played as a forward from 1957 to 1971.

Born in Zwolle, he played for Zwolsche Boys, Heracles Almelo (two spells), PEC Zwolle, GVAV, Kickers Offenbach, La Gantoise (now K.A.A. Gent), Cercle Brugge and Haarlem.

Van Nee earned five caps and scored twice for the Netherlands at international level. He made his debut on 30 September 1964, in a 1–0 loss away to Belgium in the Low Countries derby. He scored in both games he played of the Dutch team's failed 1966 FIFA World Cup qualification campaign: a 2–0 win away to Albania on 25 October 1964 and a 2–1 loss away to Northern Ireland the following 17 March.
