= Jerzy Sadek =

Polish footballer

Personal information
- Date of birth: 13 January 1942
- Place of birth: Radomsko, Poland
- Date of death: 4 November 2015 (aged 73)
- Place of death: Żyrardów, Poland
- Height: 1.75 m (5 ft 9 in)
- Position: Striker

Senior career*
Years	Team	Apps	(Gls)
1961–1973	ŁKS Łódź		
1973–1974	Sparta Rotterdam	11	(4)
1974–1976	Haarlem	83	(19)
1976–1977	ŁKS Łódź		

International career
1965–1971	Poland	18	(6)
- * Club domestic league appearances and goals

Jerzy Mirosław Sadek (13 January 1942 – 4 November 2015) was a Polish footballer who played as a striker.

== Career ==
Born in Radomsko, Sadek played for ŁKS Łódź, Sparta Rotterdam and Haarlem. With 102 goals, he is the top league goalscorer in ŁKS' history.

He also played for the Poland national team, scoring 6 goals in 18 appearances between 1965 and 1971.

== Later life and death ==
He retired to Żyrardów, where he died.
