= Semi Nuoranen =

Finnish footballer (born 1941)

Personal information
- Date of birth: 14 December 1941 (age 84)
- Place of birth: Hollola, Finland
- Position: Forward

Senior career*
Years	Team	Apps	(Gls)
1960–1966	Reipas Lahti		
1965	→ Partick Thistle (trial)	1	(0)
1967–1971	Ilves-Kissat		
1972–1973	Reipas Lahti		

International career
1961–1972	Finland	31	(2)
- * Club domestic league appearances and goals

Semi Nuoranen (born 14 December 1941) is a Finnish former footballer who played as a forward. He made 26 appearances for the Finland national team from 1961 to 1972.
