= Daan Schrijvers =

Dutch footballer

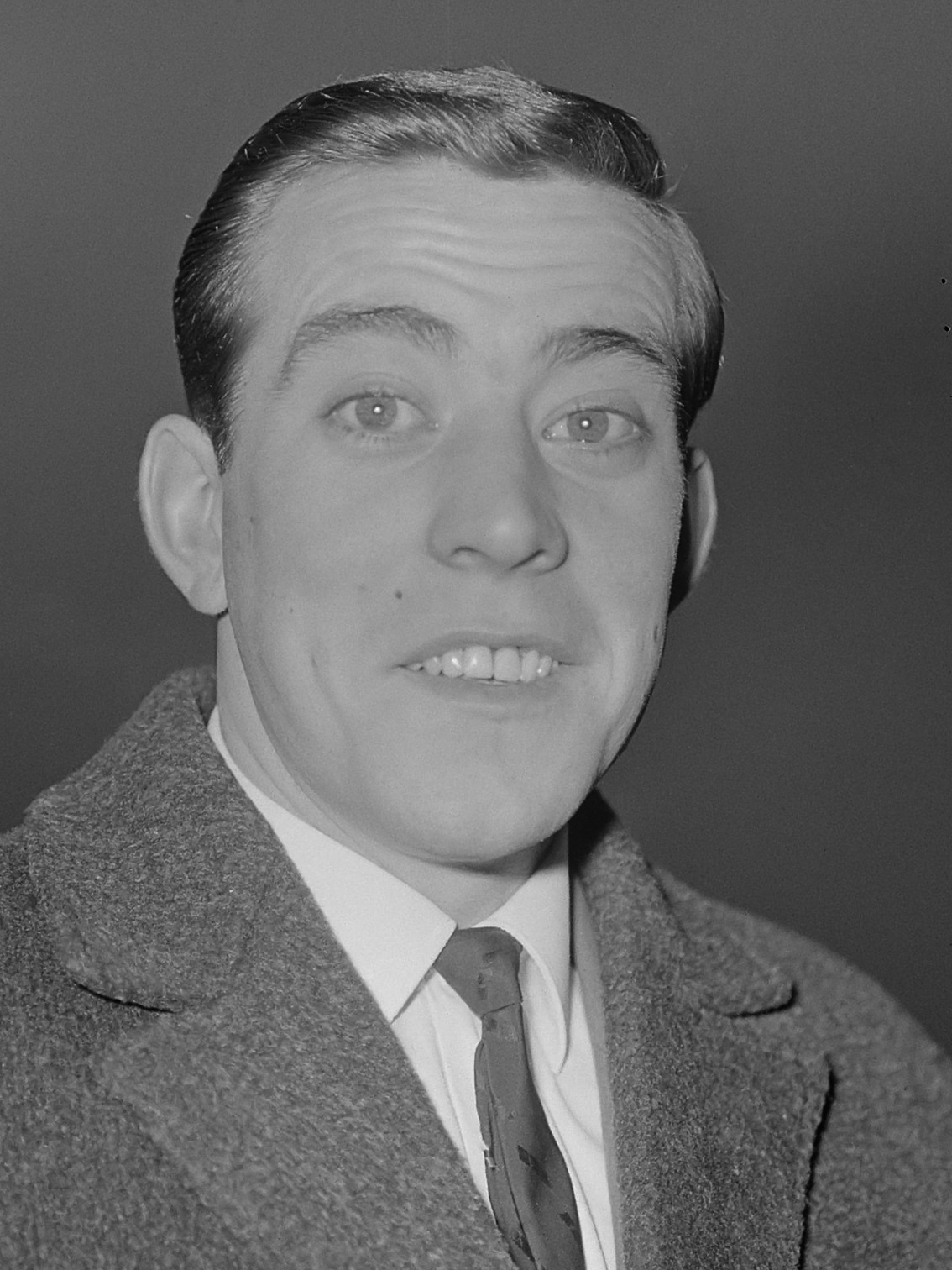
- Schrijvers in 1965

Personal information
- Full name: Daniel Christiaan Schrijvers
- Date of birth: 18 September 1941
- Place of birth: Breda, Netherlands
- Date of death: 2 August 2018 (aged 76)
- Position: Defender

Senior career*
Years	Team	Apps	(Gls)
1960–1963	NAC Breda	90	(11)
1963–1965	DWS	77	(3)
1965–1970	PSV	134	(12)
1970–1975	NAC Breda	52	(6)
Total		353	(32)

International career
1962–1967	Netherlands	22	(1)
- * Club domestic league appearances and goals

Daniel Christiaan Schijvers (18 September 1941 – 2 August 2018) was a Dutch footballer who played as a defender in his native Netherlands. He was also capped for the Netherlands national team 22 times.

== Club career ==
Born in Breda, Schrijvers started and finished his career at hometown club NAC, making his debut in 1960 and playing 169 games for the club. He also played for DWS with whom he won the league before joining PSV in 1965. He played 134 matches for the Eindhovenaren before returning to NAC in 1970.

== International career ==
Schrijvers made his debut for the Netherlands national team in a September 1962 friendly match against the Netherlands Antilles and earned a total of 22 caps, scoring one goal. His final international was a September 1966 friendly against Austria. He became skipper of the national team in 1964.
