= Finn Seemann =

Norwegian footballer (1944–1985)

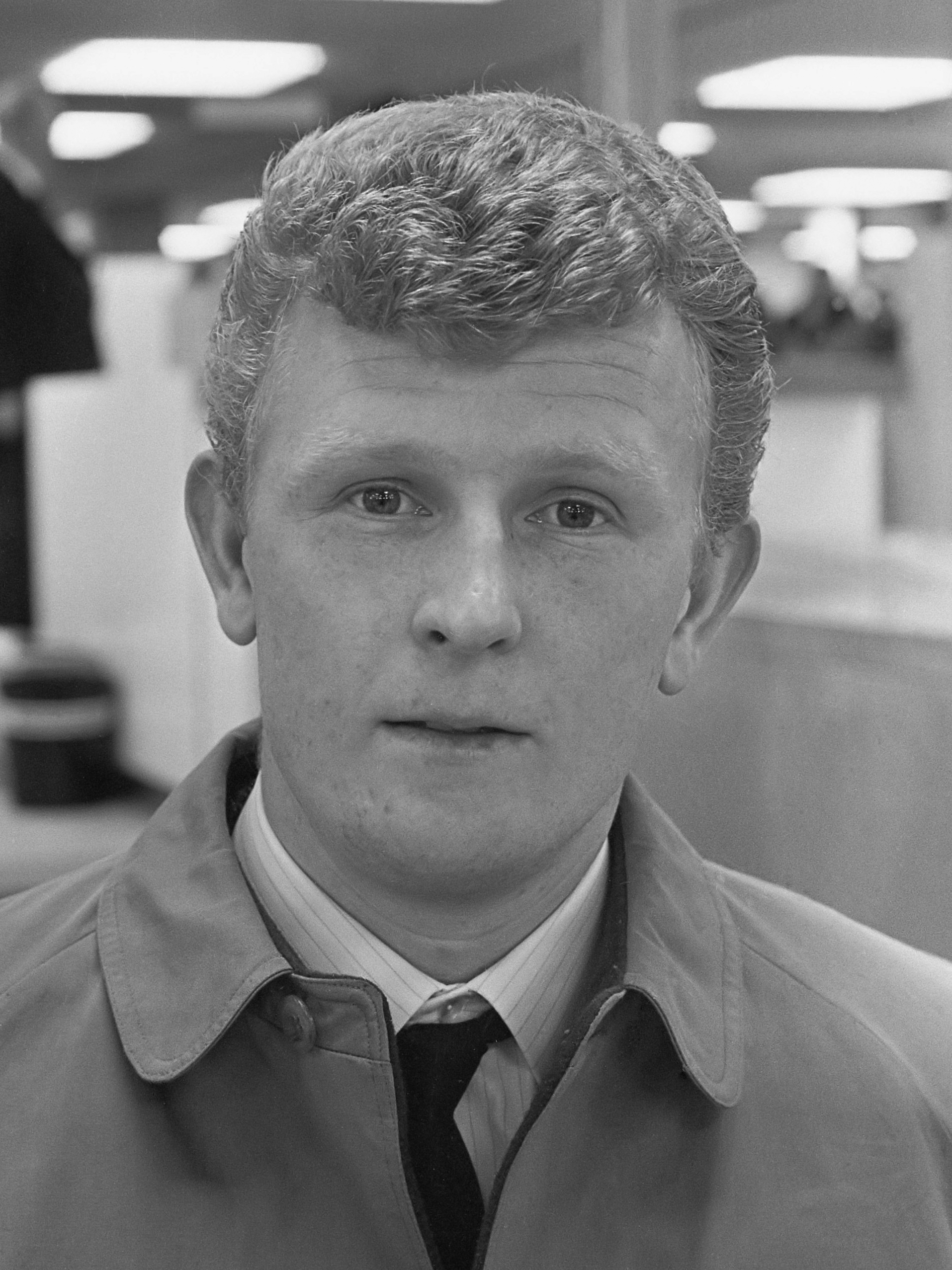
- Finn Seemann (1968)

Personal information
- Full name: Finn Ludvig Seemann
- Date of birth: 18 October 1944
- Place of birth: Oslo, Norway
- Date of death: 7 September 1985 (aged 40)
- Place of death: Dovre, Norway
- Position: Striker

Youth career
- Lyn

Senior career*
Years	Team	Apps	(Gls)
1962–1965	Lyn	45	(30)
1965–1968	Dundee United	46	(11)
1968–1971	DWS	93	(21)
1971–1973	Utrecht	25	(4)
1975	Lyn	16	(4)
1976	Bækkelaget		

International career
1963–1970	Norway	15	(4)
- * Club domestic league appearances and goals

Finn Ludvig Seemann (18 October 1944 – 7 September 1985) was a Norwegian footballer who played as a striker.

Seemann was born in Oslo. He started his football career in Lyn, where he became league champion in 1964. In 1965, he became professional in the Scottish club Dundee United. After two seasons in Scotland he went to the Netherlands, where he played for DWS and FC Utrecht, and also lived in the United States in a period before he returned to Lyn in 1975. He has also played in Vålerenga, Sarpsborg and Bækkelaget.

He was capped 15 times and scored four goals for Norway. Seemann was also capped three times for Norway in bandy. He appeared in pre-season games as a placekicker for the Houston Oilers in 1973 and 1974.

He died in a car accident in 1985, on the E6 highway near Dovre.
