= Edy Dublin =

Luxembourgish former footballer

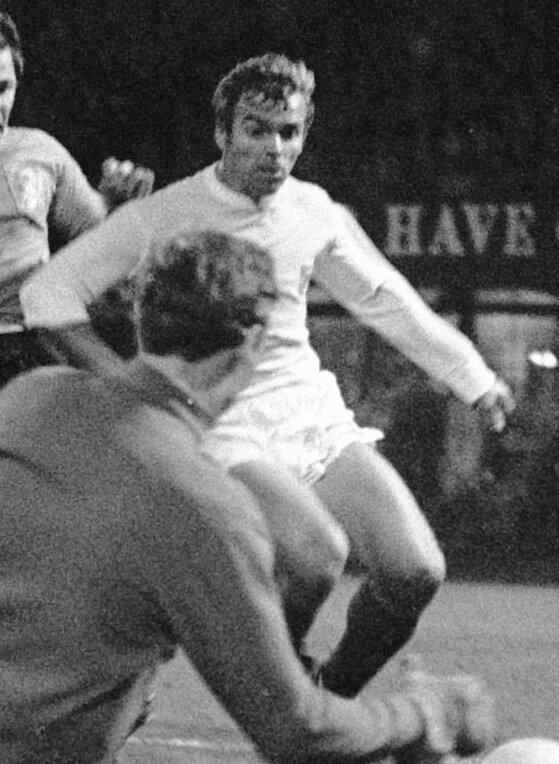
- Dublin with Luxembourg in 1968

Personal information
- Full name: Eduard Dublin
- Date of birth: 9 February 1943 (age 83)
- Place of birth: Emerange, Luxembourg
- Height: 1.67 m (5 ft 5 1/2 in)
- Position: Midfielder

Senior career*
Years	Team	Apps	(Gls)
1964–1967	Mondorf-les-Bains		
1967–1971	Nancy	100	(30)
1971–1973	Mulhouse	64	(15)
1973–1977	Besançon	114	(31)
1977–1979	Spora Luxembourg		
1979–1981	Aris Bonnevoie		
Total		278	(76)

International career
1965–1970	Luxembourg	17	(1)
- * Club domestic league appearances and goals

Eduard "Edy" Dublin (born 9 February 1943) is a Luxembourgish former footballer who played at both professional and international levels as a midfielder.

== Career ==
Born in Emerange, Dublin played club football in Luxembourg and France for Mondorf-les-Bains, Nancy, Mulhouse, Besançon, Spora Luxembourg and Aris Bonnevoie.

He earned 17 caps for Luxembourg between 1965 and 1970, appearing in eight FIFA World Cup qualifying matches.
