= Jürgen Nöldner =

German footballer (1941–2022)

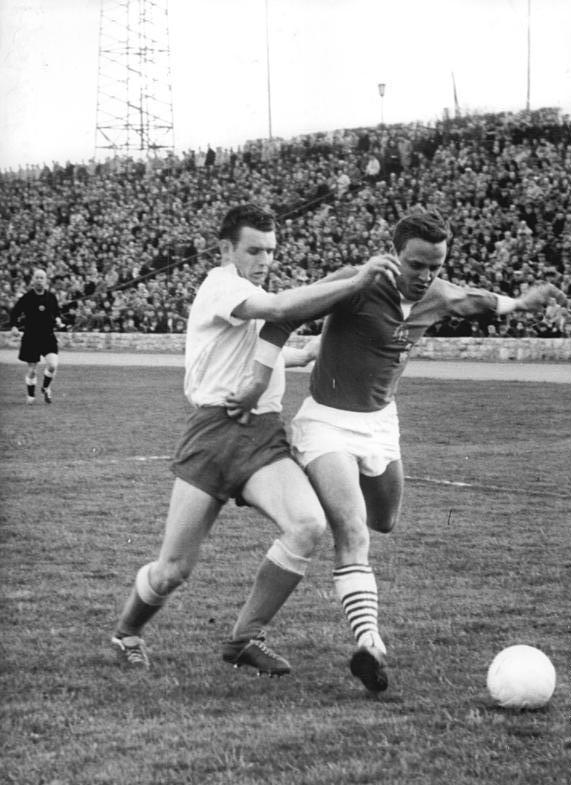
- Nöldner (right) in a match in 1962

Personal information
- Date of birth: 22 February 1941
- Place of birth: Berlin, Brandenburg, Prussia, Germany
- Date of death: 21 November 2022 (aged 81)
- Place of death: Berlin, Germany
- Position: Midfielder

Youth career
- Sparta Lichtenberg
- BEWAG/Turbine Berlin

Senior career*
Years	Team	Apps	(Gls)
1959–1973	ASK Vorwärts Berlin; FC Vorwärts Berlin; FC Vorwärts Frankfurt/Oder	285	(88)

International career
1963–1967	East Germany Olympic	11	(4)
1960–1969	East Germany	30	(16)
Medal record
Men's football
Representing Germany
Olympic Games
Bronze medal – third place	1964 Tokyo	Team competition
- * Club domestic league appearances and goals

Jürgen Nöldner (22 February 1941 – 21 November 2022) was a German footballer who was active in East Germany. He was the son of Erwin Nöldner, a resistance fighter killed by the Nazis in 1944.

== Career ==
A midfielder, Nöldner began his senior career in 1959 with ASK Vorwärts Berlin. He was to spend his entire career with the army side, staying with the club when it moved to Frankfurt/Oder in 1971. He did not like commuting between Berlin and Frankfurt/Oder and ended his career in late 1972, aged 31. During this time he was East German champion five times, and won the Cup in 1970.

He also played internationally for East Germany, winning 30 caps and scoring 16 goals, including a first-minute goal against Austria which was the fastest in the national team's history. He was part of the East German Olympic squad that represented the United German team at the Tokyo Olympic Games in 1964, winning the bronze medal. In 1966 Nöldner was voted East German Footballer of the Year, and such was his reputation that he was nicknamed "the Puskás of the DDR".

== Sports journalism ==
Nöldner retired in 1973 and became a sports journalist. He edited the Neue Fußballwoche, an East German football magazine, from 1984 to 1990, and served as Berlin editor of kicker sports magazine from 1990 until his retirement in 2006.

== Death ==
Nöldner died in Berlin on 21 November 2022, at the age of 81.

== Honours ==
Vorwärts Berlin

- DDR-Oberliga: 1960, 1962, 1965, 1966, 1969
- FDGB Pokal: 1970
