= Anton Allemann =

Swiss footballer (1936–2008)

Toni Allemann
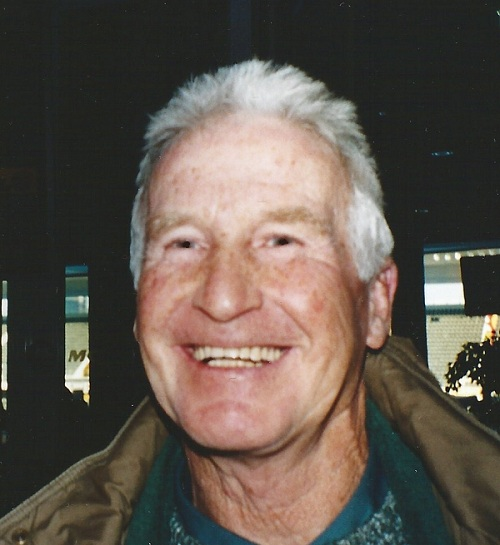

Personal information
- Full name: Anton Allemann
- Date of birth: 6 January 1936
- Place of birth: Solothurn, Switzerland
- Date of death: 3 August 2008 (aged 72)
- Place of death: Klosters, Switzerland
- Height: 1.70 m (5 ft 7 in)
- Position: Forward

Senior career*
Years	Team	Apps	(Gls)
1957–1961	Young Boys	77	(23)
1959	Hayes	15	(4)
1961–1963	Mantova	48	(10)
1963–1964	PSV	25	(6)
1964–1966	FC Nürnberg	50	(8)
1966–1968	Grasshoppers	37	(14)
1968–1969	La Chaux-de-Fonds	22	(5)
1969–1971	Solothurn		
1971–1972	Luzern	17	(1)
1972–1973	Schaffhausen		

International career
1958–1966	Switzerland	27	(9)
- * Club domestic league appearances and goals

Anton "Toni" Allemann (6 January 1936 – 3 August 2008) was a Swiss footballer. He began his career at BSC Young Boys in Bern in 1957 at age 21, where he spent four seasons.

== Early life and club career ==
Allemann came to London in 1959 as part of his training as a watchmaker. FA regulations meant that he could not play for a professional club so he joined Hayes FC making a total of 15 appearances and scoring 4 goals. In 1961, he joined Italian side A.C. Mantova, and later played for PSV Eindhoven in the Netherlands, and 1. FC Nürnberg in Germany, before returning home to Switzerland in 1966 to play for Grasshopper-Club Zürich.

== International career ==
At the international level, Allemann played 27 times for the Swiss national team, and scored nine international goals. He made his national-team debut in a friendly match against Sweden in 1958, and was a member of Switzerland's 1962 FIFA World Cup squad. He played his last international match in June 1966, where he scored the qualification goal but he was omitted from Switzerland's World Cup squad the same year.

== Personal life ==
=== Death ===
Allemann died 3 August 2008, aged 72, after suffering a heart attack.
