= Mexhit Haxhiu =

Albanian footballer

Personal information
- Full name: Mexhit Dalip Haxhiu
- Date of birth: 3 January 1943 (age 83)
- Place of birth: Vlorë, Albania
- Height: 1.75 m (5 ft 9 in)
- Positions: Striker; attacking midfielder

Youth career
- 1959–1961: Flamurtari Vlorë

Senior career*
Years	Team	Apps	(Gls)
1961–1963	Flamurtari		
1963–1966	Partizani		(10)
1967–1976	Flamurtari		
1967	→ Besa (loan)	0	(0)

International career
1964–1965	Albania	3	(1)
- * Club domestic league appearances and goals

Mexhit Haxhiu (born 3 January 1943) is an Albanian former footballer who played for Flamurtari Vlorë, Partizani Tirana and Besa Kavajë, as well as the Albania national team. He is currently the 19th top goalscorer in Albanian history with 87 league goals, 77 of which he scored for Flamurtari Vlorë and 10 for Partizani Tirana.

== Club career ==
In his youth, Haxhiu played schoolboy football and also represented his hometown Vlorë in basketball and free-style swimming. He started with local side Flamurtari's youth team in 1959 and in 1963 he was summoned to Partizani to fulfil his military service. He was allowed to return to Flamurtari in 1966, but did not play for a year after the Sigurimi accused him to be son of a foreign agent (his father Dalip fled the country in 1944) and he was subsequently prohibited to play for neither the national team, a team from Tirana nor the army team (Partizani) ever again. Injury made him finish his career in 1976 at 33 years of age, scoring a total of 166 goals for Flamurtari.

== International career ==
He made his debut for Albania in an October 1964 friendly match against Algeria and earned a total of 3 caps, scoring 1 goal. His final international was a November 1965 FIFA World Cup qualification match against Northern Ireland, since he was not allowed in the national team by the communist leaders from 1966.

== Managerial career ==
He later coached at Flamurtari and Bylis as well as the national team under-16. In December 2014 he was appointed director of the Flamurtari Vlorë youth academy.

== Personal life ==
Haxhiu is married to Fathbarda and they have two sons, Saimir and Gerdin.

The defection of his father in December 1944 had much impact on his life and football career and he would only meet his father again after 47 years in Paris in March 1991, after the infamous European qualification match away against France, when many players then also defected to Western Europe. They met again on his father's return to Albania only in September 1992 and Dalip died in December 1993. In 2015, Haxhiu published his biography called Katroni i Kuq (Red Card).

== Honours ==
- Albanian Superliga: 1

1964

- Albanian Cup: 1

1966
