= Máté Fenyvesi =

Hungarian footballer and politician (1933–2022)

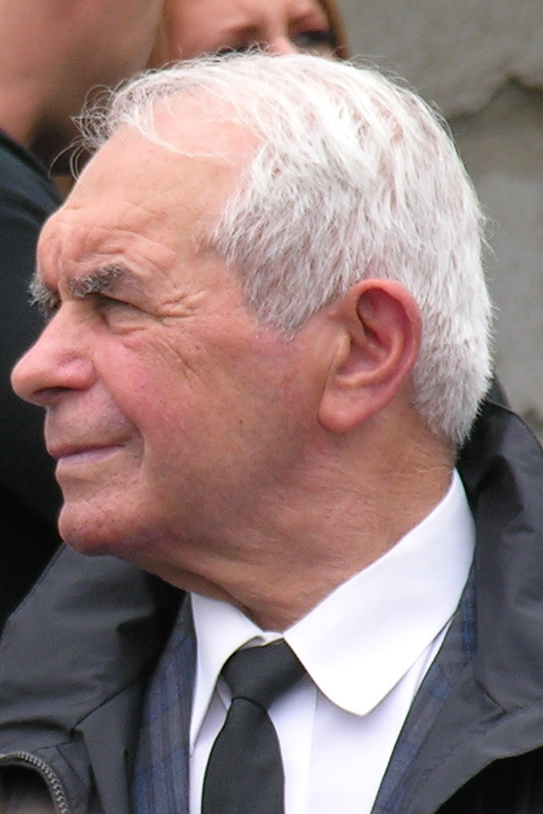
- Fenyvesi in 2011

Personal information
- Date of birth: 20 September 1933
- Place of birth: Jánoshalma, Hungary
- Date of death: 17 February 2022 (aged 88)
- Position: Forward

Senior career*
Years	Team	Apps	(Gls)
1948–1951	Jánoshalmai SE		
1951–1953	Kecskeméti		
1953–1969	Ferencváros	343	(81)

International career
1954–1966	Hungary	76	(8)
- * Club domestic league appearances and goals

Máté Fenyvesi (20 September 1933 – 17 February 2022) was a Hungarian footballer and politician.

== Career ==
During his club career he played for Kecskeméti Kinizsi for two years, and from 1953 to 1969 for Ferencvárosi TC. He earned 76 caps and scored eight goals for the Hungary national team from 1954 to 1966, and participated in the 1958 FIFA World Cup, the 1962 FIFA World Cup, the 1964 European Nations' Cup, and the 1966 FIFA World Cup. He also scored the winning goal in the final of the 1964–65 edition of the Inter-Cities Fair Cup, winning the game for Ferencvaros against Juventus 1–0.

Following his retirement, he worked as a veterinarian, having earned an M.D. degree still while playing. Following the democratic changes in Hungary at the turn of 1989 and 1990, he became actively involved in politics and served as a Member of Parliament from 1998 to 2006, first representing the Smallholders' Party, later Fidesz.

== Personal life and death ==
Fenyvesi was married to Mária Fehér Kaplár. They had a daughter, Beatrix, and a son, Levente. He died in his sleep on 17 February 2022, at the age of 88. Mihály Vasas is the last surviving player of the 1958 Hungary national team to play in the 1958 world cup.
