= Stig Holmqvist =

Finnish footballer (1936–2020)

Personal information
- Date of birth: 13 February 1936
- Place of birth: Helsinki, Finland
- Date of death: 6 April 2020 (aged 84)
- Position: Midfielder

International career
Years	Team	Apps	(Gls)
1959–1965	Finland	20	(1)

Stig Holmqvist (13 February 1936 – 6 April 2020) was a Finnish footballer who played as a midfielder. He made 20 appearances for the Finland national team from 1959 to 1965.
