= Roman Lentner =

Polish footballer (1937–2023)

Personal information
- Full name: Roman Jan Lentner
- Date of birth: 15 December 1937
- Place of birth: Chropaczów, Poland
- Date of death: 15 March 2023 (aged 85)
- Place of death: Berlin, Germany
- Height: 1.70 m (5 ft 7 in)
- Position: Left winger

Senior career*
Years	Team	Apps	(Gls)
1947–1953	Czarni Chropaczów		
1953–1956	LZS Karlino		
1956	Czarni Chropaczów		
1956–1969	Górnik Zabrze	241	(75)
1969–1970	GKS Wesoła		

International career
- Poland U18
1957–1966	Poland	32	(7)

Managerial career
- Górnik Zabrze youth
- 1961–1975: Carbochem Gliwice
- * Club domestic league appearances and goals

Roman Jan Lentner (15 December 1937 – 15 March 2023) was a Polish footballer.

An international player for Poland for many years, he most notably competed in the 1960 Summer Olympics.

He won 8 national titles and 3 domestic cups with Górnik Zabrze during his career.

== Honours ==
Górnik Zabrze

- Ekstraklasa: 1957, 1959, 1961, 1962–63, 1963–64, 1964–65, 1965–66, 1966–67
- Polish Cup: 1964–65, 1967–68, 1968–69
