= Martti Hyvärinen =

Finnish footballer (born 1939)

Personal information
- Date of birth: 6 November 1939 (age 86)
- Position: Forward

Senior career*
Years	Team	Apps	(Gls)
1958-1960	KuPS	59	(11)
1961-1972	Reipas	211	(108)

International career
1959–1967	Finland	16	(1)
- * Club domestic league appearances and goals

Martti Hyvärinen (born 6 November 1939) is a Finnish former footballer. He played in 16 matches for the Finland national football team from 1959 to 1967.

With 119 goals in 270 games he is 10th in all time goalscorers list of Finnish premier division. During his career he won 3 Finnish championships and 1 cup title.
