= Ole Stavrum =

Norwegian footballer (born 1940)

Personal information
- Full name: Ole Einar Stavrum
- Date of birth: 22 May 1940 (age 86)
- Place of birth: Kristiansund, Norway
- Position: Forward

Senior career*
Years	Team	Apps	(Gls)
- Clausenengen FK
- Lyn Oslo
19–19	Clausenengen FK		

International career
1964–1966	Norway	8	(2)
- * Club domestic league appearances and goals

Ole Einar Stavrum (born 22 May 1940) is a Norwegian former footballer who played as a forward. He made eight appearances for the Norway national team from 1964 to 1966.
