= René-Pierre Quentin =

Swiss footballer (born 1943)

Personal information
- Full name: René-Pierre Quentin
- Date of birth: 5 August 1943 (age 83)
- Place of birth: Collombey-Muraz, Switzerland
- Height: 1.77 m (5 ft 9 1/2 in)
- Position: Forward

Senior career*
Years	Team	Apps	(Gls)
1963–1968	FC Sion	148	(62)
1968–1971	FC Zürich	67	(9)
1971–1975	FC Sion	58	(6)
Total		273	(77)

International career
1964–1973	Switzerland	34	(10)
- * Club domestic league appearances and goals

René-Pierre Quentin (born 5 August 1943) is a former Swiss football player.

He got 34 caps and 9 goals for Switzerland, playing two games at the 1966 World Cup. He scored Switzerland's only goal in the tournament, against Spain.

He is the "uncle" of Yvan, also Swiss international.
