= Philippe Gondet =

French footballer (1942–2018)

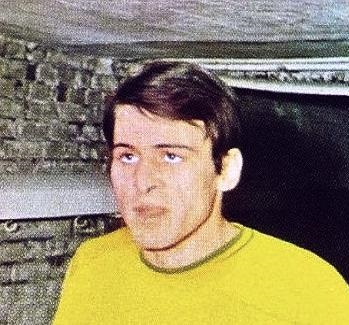
- Gondet in 1970

Personal information
- Full name: Philippe Jean-Marie Gondet
- Date of birth: 17 May 1942
- Place of birth: Blois, Loir-et-Cher, France
- Date of death: 21 January 2018 (aged 75)
- Place of death: Vertou, Loire-Atlantique, France
- Height: 1.74 m (5 ft 9 in)
- Position: Forward

Youth career
- Blois

Senior career*
Years	Team	Apps	(Gls)
1958–1959	Blois		
1959–1960	Stade Français		
1960–1971	Nantes	232	(117)
1971	Paris-Joinville	13	(4)
1972	Red Star	18	(2)
1972–1973	Caen	28	(3)

International career
1965–1970	France	14	(7)
- * Club domestic league appearances and goals

Philippe Jean-Marie Gondet (French: [filip ɡɔ̃dɛ]; 17 May 1942 – 21 January 2018) was a French professional footballer who played as a forward. He played for France at the 1966 FIFA World Cup in England.
