= Johnny Thio =

Belgian footballer

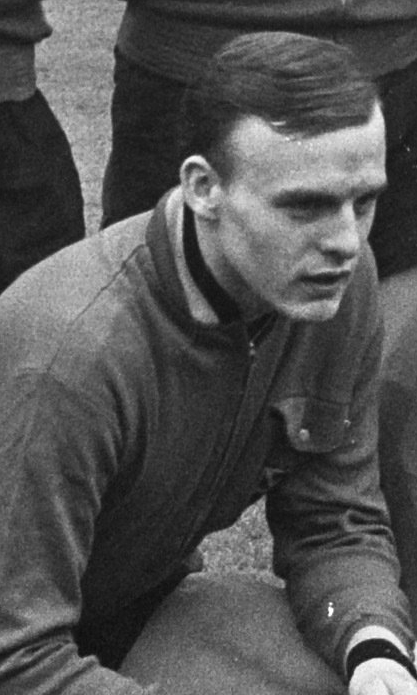
Johnny Thio in 1966

Johnny Thio (2 September 1944 in Roeselare – 4 August 2008 in Hooglede) was a Belgian footballer.

During his career he played for Club Brugge K.V. He earned 18 caps for the Belgium national football team, and participated in UEFA Euro 1972.

== Honours ==
=== Player ===
Club Brugge

- Belgian First Division: 1972–73
- Belgian Cup: 1967–68, 1969–70
- Jules Pappaert Cup: 1972

=== International ===
==== Belgium ====
- UEFA Euro 1972: Third place
