= Andy McEvoy =

Irish footballer (1938–1994)

Personal information
- Date of birth: 15 July 1938
- Place of birth: Dublin, Ireland
- Date of death: 7 May 1994 (aged 55)
- Positions: Wing-half; inside forward

Youth career
- Shamrock Rovers
- Bray Wanderers

Senior career*
Years	Team	Apps	(Gls)
1956–1967	Blackburn Rovers	183	(89)
1967–1972	Limerick	114	(38)
Total		297	(127)

International career
1961–1967	Republic of Ireland	17	(6)

Managerial career
- Bray Wanderers
- * Club domestic league appearances and goals

Andy McEvoy (15 July 1938 – 7 May 1994) was an Irish professional footballer who played as a wing-half or inside forward.

== Career statistics ==
Appearances and goals by national team and year
National team	Year	Apps	Goals
Republic of Ireland	1961	2	0
Republic of Ireland	1963	2	0
Republic of Ireland	1964	6	4
Republic of Ireland	1965	4	1
Republic of Ireland	1966	2	1
Republic of Ireland	1967	1	0
Total		17	6
