= Denmark national football team results (1960–1969) =

This is a list of Association football games played by the Denmark national football team between 1960 and 1969. During the 1960s, the Danish national team played 91 games, winning 40, drawing 13, and losing 38. In these games, they scored 195 goals, while conceding 160 to their opponents. The first game of the 1960s was the May 26, 1960, game against Norway, the 234th overall Danish national team game. The last game of the 1960s was the October 22, 1969, game against Hungary, the 324th game of the Danish national team.

== Key ==
- EN – European Nations Cup match
- ENQ - European Nations Cup Qualifying match
- F – Friendly match
- NC - Nordic Football Championship match
- OG - Olympic Games match
- OGQ - Olympic Games Qualifying match
- WCQ – World Cup Qualifying match

== Games ==
Note that scores are written Denmark first

#	Date	Venue	Opponents	Score	Comp	Denmark scorers
234	1960-05-26	Idrætsparken, Copenhagen (H)	Norway	3-0	NC	Poul Pedersen, Flemming Nielsen (2)
235	1960-07-03	Idrætsparken, Copenhagen (H)	Greece	7-2	F	Harald Nielsen (3), Henning Enoksen (3), Poul Pedersen
236	1960-07-27	Idrætsparken, Copenhagen (H)	Hungary	1-0	F	Jørgen Hansen
237	1960-08-10	Idrætsparken, Copenhagen (H)	Finland	2-1	NC	Harald Nielsen (2)
238	1960-08-26	Stadio Flaminio, Rome (N)	Argentina	3-2	OG	Jørn Sørensen, Harald Nielsen (2)
239	1960-08-29	Stadio di Ardenza, Livorno (N)	Poland	2-1	OG	Harald Nielsen, Poul Pedersen
240	1960-09-01	Stadio Municipal, L'Aquila (N)	Tunisia	3-1	OG	Flemming Nielsen, Harald Nielsen (2)
241	1960-09-06	Stadio Flaminio, Rome (N)	Hungary	2-0	OG	Harald Nielsen, Henning Enoksen
242	1960-09-10	Stadio Olimpico, Rome (N)	Yugoslavia	1-3	OG	Flemming Nielsen
243	1960-10-23	Nya Ullevi, Gothenburg (A)	Sweden	0-2	NC	
244	1961-05-28	Idrætsparken, Copenhagen (H)	East Germany	1-1	F	Ole Madsen
245	1961-06-18	Idrætsparken, Copenhagen (H)	Sweden	1-2	NC	Ole Madsen
246	1961-09-17	Ullevaal, Oslo (A)	Norway	4-0	NC	John Danielsen (2), Ole Madsen, Ole Sørensen
247	1961-09-20	Rheinstadion, Düsseldorf (A)	West Germany	1-5	F	own goal (Willi Giesemann)
248	1961-10-15	Idrætsparken, Copenhagen (H)	Finland	9-1	NC	Jørn Sørensen (3), John Danielsen (2), Ole Madsen (2), Egon Rasmussen (2)
249	1961-11-05	Stadion Slaski, Chorzów (A)	Poland	0-5	F	
250	1962-05-23	Zentralstadion, Leipzig (A)	East Germany	1-4	F	Ole Madsen
251	1962-06-11	Idrætsparken, Copenhagen (H)	Norway	6-1	NC	Helge Jørgensen (pen), Ole Madsen (3), Carl Bertelsen, Henning Enoksen (pen)
252	1962-06-28	Idrætsparken, Copenhagen (H)	Malta	6-1	ENQ	Ole Madsen (3), Eyvind Clausen, Henning Enoksen, Carl Bertelsen
253	1962-09-11	Odense Stadion, Odense (H)	Curaçao	3-1	F	Henning Enoksen (2), Ole Madsen
254	1962-09-16	Olympic Stadium, Helsinki (A)	Finland	6-1	NC	Eyvind Clausen, Henning Enoksen (2), Helge Jørgensen, Ole Madsen (2)
255	1962-09-26	Idrætsparken, Copenhagen (H)	Netherlands	4-1	F	Ole Madsen, Henning Enoksen (2), Carl Bertelsen
256	1962-10-28	Råsunda, Stockholm (A)	Sweden	2-4	NC	Carl Bertelsen, Ole Madsen
257	1962-12-08	Empire Stadium, Gżira (A)	Malta	3-1	ENQ	Ole Madsen, Carl Bertelsen, Carl Emil Christiansen
258	1962-12-12	?, Istanbul (A)	Turkey	1-1	F	Ole Madsen
259	1963-05-19	Népstadion, Budapest (A)	Hungary	0-6	F	
260	1963-06-03	Idrætsparken, Copenhagen (H)	Finland	1-1	NC	Henning Enoksen
261	1963-06-23	Idrætsparken, Copenhagen (H)	Romania	2-3	OGQ	Palle Bruun, Henning Enoksen
262	1963-06-29	Idrætsparken, Copenhagen (H)	Albania	4-0	ENQ	Jens Petersen, Ole Madsen, Eyvind Clausen, Henning Enoksen
263	1963-09-15	Ullevaal, Oslo (A)	Norway	4-0	NC	Kjeld Thorst, Carl Bertelsen (2), Henning Enoksen
264	1963-10-06	Idrætsparken, Copenhagen (H)	Sweden	2-2	NC	Ole Madsen, Kjeld Thorst
265	1963-10-30	Qemal Stafa, Tirana (A)	Albania	0-1	ENQ	
266	1963-11-03	August 23, Bucharest (A)	Romania	3-2	OGQ	Kjeld Thorst (2), Carl Bertelsen
267	1963-11-28	Stadio Comunale, Turin (A)	Romania	1-2	OGQ	Kjeld Thorst
268	1963-12-04	Stade Municipal, Luxembourg (A)	Luxembourg	3-3	ENQ	Ole Madsen (3)
269	1963-12-10	Idrætsparken, Copenhagen (H)	Luxembourg	2-2	ENQ	Ole Madsen (2)
270	1963-12-18	Olympisch Stadion, Amsterdam (N)	Luxembourg	1-0	ENQ	Ole Madsen
271	1964-06-17	Camp Nou, Barcelona (N)	Soviet Union	0-3	EN	
272	1964-06-20	Camp Nou, Barcelona (N)	Hungary	1-3	EN	Carl Bertelsen
273	1964-06-28	Malmö Stadion, Malmö (A)	Sweden	1-4	NC	John Danielsen
274	1964-09-06	Olympic Stadium, Helsinki (A)	Finland	1-2	NC	Jørgen Rasmussen
275	1964-10-11	Idrætsparken, Copenhagen (H)	Norway	2-0	NC	Ole Madsen (2)
276	1964-10-21	Idrætsparken, Copenhagen (H)	Wales	1-0	WCQ	Ole Madsen
277	1964-11-29	?, Athens (A)	Greece	2-4	WCQ	Mogens Berg, Ole Madsen
278	1964-12-01	Ramat Gan Stadium, Ramat Gan (A)	Israel	1-0	F	Tom Søndergaard
279	1964-12-05	Stadio Comunale, Bologna (A)	Italy	1-3	F	Henning Enoksen
280	1965-06-09	Idrætsparken, Copenhagen (H)	Finland	3-1	NC	Ole Sørensen (pen), Ole Madsen (2)
281	1965-06-20	Idrætsparken, Copenhagen (H)	Sweden	2-1	NC	Ole Madsen, Ole Sørensen
282	1965-06-27	Lenin Stadium, Moscow (A)	Soviet Union	0-6	WCQ	
283	1965-07-05	Laurgardalsvöllur, Reykjavík (A)	Iceland	3-1	F	Ole Madsen, Egon Hansen, Keld Pedersen
284	1965-09-26	Ullevaal, Oslo (A)	Norway	2-2	NC	Tommy Troelsen, Ole Fritsen
285	1965-10-17	Idrætsparken, Copenhagen (H)	Soviet Union	1-3	WCQ	Tommy Troelsen
286	1965-10-27	Idrætsparken, Copenhagen (H)	Greece	1-1	WCQ	Ole Fritsen
287	1965-12-01	Racecourse Ground, Wrexham (A)	Wales	2-4	WCQ	Kaj Poulsen, Ole Fritsen
288	1966-05-30	Idrætsparken, Copenhagen (H)	Turkey	0-0	F	
289	1966-06-21	Esbjerg Idrætspark, Esbjerg (H)	Portugal	1-3	F	Ulrik le Fevre
290	1966-06-26	Idrætsparken, Copenhagen (H)	Norway	0-1	NC	
291	1966-07-03	Idrætsparken, Copenhagen (H)	England	0-2	F	
292	1966-09-18	Olympic Stadium, Helsinki (A)	Finland	1-2	NC	Jørgen Jørgensen
293	1966-09-21	Stadium Puskás Ferenc, Budapest (A)	Hungary	0-6	ECQ	
294	1966-10-26	Idrætsparken, Copenhagen (H)	Israel	3-1	F	Kjeld Thorst, Johnny Hansen, René Møller
295	1966-11-06	Råsunda, Stockholm (A)	Sweden	1-2	NC	Finn Wiberg
296	1966-11-30	De Kuip, Rotterdam (A)	Netherlands	0-2	ECQ	
297	1967-05-24	Idrætsparken, Copenhagen (H)	Hungary	0-2	ECQ	
298	1967-06-04	Idrætsparken, Copenhagen (H)	East Germany	1-1	ECQ	Kresten Bjerre
299	1967-06-25	Idrætsparken, Copenhagen (H)	Sweden	1-1	NC	Kresten Bjerre
300	1967-08-23	Idrætsparken, Copenhagen (H)	Iceland	14-2	F	John Steen Olsen (2), Finn Laudrup (3), Kresten Bjerre (3, incl. 2 pen), Tom Søndergaard, Ulrik le Fevre (3), Erik Dyreborg (2)
301	1967-09-24	Ullevaal, Oslo (A)	Norway	5-0	NC	Erik Dyreborg (5)
302	1967-10-04	Idrætsparken, Copenhagen (H)	Netherlands	3-2	ECQ	Kresten Bjerre (2), Tom Søndergaard
303	1967-10-11	Zentralstadion, Leipzig (A)	East Germany	2-3	ECQ	Erik Dyreborg, Tom Søndergaard
304	1967-10-22	Idrætsparken, Copenhagen (H)	Finland	3-0	NC	Johnny Hansen, Kresten Bjerre (pen), Finn Laudrup
305	1968-06-04	Olympic Stadium, Helsinki (A)	Finland	3-1	NC	Karsten Lund (2), Ulrik le Fevre
306	1968-06-23	Idrætsparken, Copenhagen (H)	Norway	5-1	NC	Tommy Troelsen (3), Steen Rømer Larsen (2)
307	1968-06-27	Råsunda, Stockholm (A)	Sweden	1-2	NC	own goal (Björn Nordqvist)
308	1968-09-25	Idrætsparken, Copenhagen (H)	Czechoslovakia	0-3	WCQ	
309	1968-10-16	Idrætsparken, Copenhagen (H)	Scotland	0-1	F	
310	1968-10-20	Tehelné Park, Bratislava (A)	Czechoslovakia	0-1	WCQ	
311	1968-11-20	Idrætsparken, Copenhagen (H)	Luxembourg	5-1	F	Bent Jensen (2), Finn Wiberg (3)
312	1968-12-04	Dalymount Park, Dublin (A)	Republic of Ireland	1-1	WCQ	Finn Wiberg
313	1969-01-12	National Stadium, Hamilton (A)	Bermuda	5-1	F	Bent Jensen (3), Niels-Christian Holmstrøm, Leif Sørensen
314	1969-01-15	Suriname Stadium, Paramaribo (A)	Suriname	1-2	F	Henning Munk Jensen
315	1969-01-22	Estadio Azteca, Mexico City (A)	Mexico	0-3	F	
316	1969-05-06	Idrætsparken, Copenhagen (H)	Mexico	3-1	F	Leif Sørensen, Ole Madsen, Bent Jensen
317	1969-05-27	Idrætsparken, Copenhagen (H)	Republic of Ireland	2-0	WCQ	Ole Sørensen (2)
318	1969-06-15	Idrætsparken, Copenhagen (H)	Hungary	3-2	WCQ	Ole Sørensen, Ulrik le Fevre, Ole Madsen
319	1969-06-25	Idrætsparken, Copenhagen (H)	Sweden	0-1	NC	
320	1969-07-01	Aalborg Stadion, Aalborg (H)	Bermuda	6-0	F	Leif Sørensen, Bent Jensen (3, incl. 1 pen), Allan Michaelsen, Ole Sørensen
321	1969-09-10	Idrætsparken, Copenhagen (H)	Finland	5-2	NC	Bent Jensen (3), Steen Rømer Larsen (2)
322	1969-09-21	Ullevaal, Oslo (A)	Norway	0-2	NC	
323	1969-10-15	Dalymount Park, Dublin (A)	Republic of Ireland	1-1	WCQ	Bent Jensen
324	1969-10-22	Stadium Puskás Ferenc, Budapest (A)	Hungary	0-3	WCQ	

== See also ==
- List of Denmark national football team results
- Denmark national football team statistics

== Sources ==
- Landsholdsdatabasen at Danish Football Association
- A-LANDSKAMPE - 1960 - 1969 at Haslund.info
