= List of Denmark national football team hat-tricks =

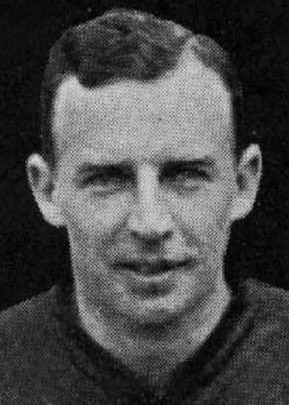
Poul Nielsen holds the record for the most hat-tricks scored by a Danish player with eight

This page is a list of the hat-tricks scored for the Denmark national football team. Since Denmark's first international football match in 1908, there have been 56 occasions when a Danish player has scored three or more goals (a hat-trick) in a game. The first hat-trick was scored by Vilhelm Wolfhagen against France B in the team's first-ever game on 19 October 1908. Poul Nielsen holds the record for the most hat-tricks scored by a Danish player with eight, five of which came against Norway. The record for the most goals scored in an international game by a Danish player is ten, which has been achieved on just one occasion: by Sophus Nielsen against France in the 1908 Summer Olympics semi-finals of the 1908 Summer Olympics, which was also a world record until it was broken by Archie Thompson broke it when he scored 13 goals in a 31–0 victory over American Samoa in 2001.

Preben Elkjær are the only Danish players to have scored a hat-trick at the FIFA World Cup finals.

== Hat-tricks scored by Denmark ==
No.	Player	Opponent	Goals	Score	Venue	!Competition	!Date	Ref(s)
1	Vilhelm Wolfhagen	France B	4 – (15', 17', 67', 72')	9–0	White City Stadium, London	1908 Summer Olympics First round	19 October 1908	
2	Sophus Nielsen	France	10 – (3', 4', 6', 39', 46', 48', 52', 64', 66', 76')	17–1	White City Stadium, London	1908 Summer Olympics semi-finals	22 October 1908	
3	Vilhelm Wolfhagen (2)	France	4 – (60', 72', 82', 89')	17–1	White City Stadium, London	1908 Summer Olympics semi-finals	22 October 1908	
4	Anthon Olsen	Norway	3 – (4', 70', 88')	7–0	Tranebergs Idrottsplats, Stockholm	1912 Summer Olympics quarter-finals	30 June 1912	
5	Kristian Gyldenstein	Sweden	3 – (17', 56', 61')	8–0	Idrætsparken, Copenhagen	Friendly	25 May 1913	
6	Poul Nielsen	Sweden	6 – (5', 10', 29', 47', 50', 53')	10–0	Idrætsparken, Copenhagen	Friendly	5 October 1913	
7	Poul Nielsen (2)	Germany	4 – (5', 7', 42', 87')	4–1	Hamburg, Stadion Hoheluft	Friendly	26 October 1913	
8	Poul Nielsen (3)	Norway	3 – (20', 63', 69')	4–3	Københavns Idrætspark, Copenhagen	Friendly	17 May 1914	
9	Poul Nielsen (4)	Norway	3 – (23', 37', 71'	8–1	Københavns Idrætspark, Copenhagen	Friendly	19 September 1915	
10	Anthon Olsen (2)	Norway	3 – (28', 65', 77')	8–1	Københavns Idrætspark, Copenhagen	Friendly	19 September 1915	
11	Poul Nielsen (5)	Norway	4 – (25', 40', 47', 70')	8–0	Københavns Idrætspark, Copenhagen	Friendly	15 October 1916	
12	Michael Rohde	Norway	3 – (2', 10', 57')	8–0	Københavns Idrætspark, Copenhagen	Friendly	15 October 1916	
13	Victor Klein	Norway	3 – (9', 13', 25')	12–0	Københavns Idrætspark, Copenhagen	Friendly	7 October 1917	
14	Poul Nielsen (6)	Norway	5 – (71', 75', 77', 78', 81')	6–2	Københavns Idrætspark, Copenhagen	Friendly	7 October 1917	
15	Poul Nielsen (7)	Norway	3 – (24', 42', 59')	4–1	Københavns Idrætspark, Copenhagen	Friendly	12 June 1919	
16	Poul Nielsen (8)	Norway	3 – (7', 51', 75')	3–1	Københavns Idrætspark, Copenhagen	Friendly	2 October 1921	
17	Viggo Jørgensen	Netherlands	3 – (44', 58', 84')	4–1	Københavns Idrætspark, Copenhagen	Friendly	13 June 1926	
18	Pauli Jørgensen	Finland	3 – (17', 41', 85')	8–0	Københavns Idrætspark, Copenhagen	1929–32 Nordic Football Championship	13 October 1929	
19	Pauli Jørgensen (2)	Sweden	3 – (17', 65', 88')	6–1	Københavns Idrætspark, Copenhagen	1929–32 Nordic Football Championship	22 June 1930	
20	Pauli Jørgensen (3)	Germany	3 – (13', 58', 90'	6–3	Københavns Idrætspark, Copenhagen	Friendly	7 September 1930	
21	Pauli Jørgensen (4)	Norway	3 – (3', 54', 80')	6–3	Københavns Idrætspark, Copenhagen	Dansk Boldspil-Union 50th Anniversary Tournament	18 June 1939	
22	Oskar Theisen	Finland	3 – (39', 57', 89')	8–1	Københavns Idrætspark, Copenhagen	1937–47 Nordic Football Championship	17 September 1939	
23	Kaj Hansen	Sweden	3 – (23', 37', 41')	3–3	Københavns Idrætspark, Copenhagen	Friendly	20 October 1940	
24	Karl Aage Hansen	Norway	5 – (20', 52', 78', 89')	7–1	Københavns Idrætspark, Copenhagen	Friendly	20 October 1946	
25	Carl Aage Præst	Poland	3 – (39', 73', 88')	8–0	Københavns Idrætspark, Copenhagen	Friendly	26 June 1948	
26	John Hansen	Italy	3 – (31', 55', 75', 81')	5–3	Highbury, London	1948 Olympic Games	5 August 1948	
27	Egon Jensen	Italy	3 – (5', 41', 80')	6–2	Laugardalsvöllur, Reykjavík	Knattspyrnusamband Íslands 10th Anniversary Tournament	10 July 1957	
28	Harald Nielsen	Finland	3 – (20', 22', 53')	4–0	Københavns Idrætspark, Copenhagen	1956–59 Nordic Football Championship	4 October 1959	
29	Harald Nielsen (2)	Greece	3 – (16', 47', 86')	7–2	Københavns Idrætspark, Copenhagen	Friendly	3 July 1960	
30	Henning Enoksen	Greece	3 – (34', 51', 90')	7–2	Københavns Idrætspark, Copenhagen	Friendly	3 July 1960	
31	Jørn Sørensen	Finland	3 – (7', 52', 85')	9–1	Københavns Idrætspark, Copenhagen	1960–63 Nordic Football Championship	15 October 1961	
32	Ole Madsen	Norway	3 – (31', 44', 87')	6–1	Københavns Idrætspark, Copenhagen	1960–63 Nordic Football Championship	11 June 1962	
33	Ole Madsen (2)	Malta	3 – (9', 14', 49')	6–1	Københavns Idrætspark, Copenhagen	1964 Euro qualifying	28 June 1962	
34	Ole Madsen (3)	Luxembourg	3 – (10', 32', 46')	3–3	Stade Municipal, Luxembourg City	1964 Euro qualifying	4 December 1963	
35	Ulrik Le Fevre	Iceland	3 – (57', 62', 67')	14–2	Københavns Idrætspark, Copenhagen	Friendly	23 August 1967	
36	Finn Laudrup	Iceland	3 – (7', 28', 85')	14–2	Københavns Idrætspark, Copenhagen	Friendly	23 August 1967	
37	Kresten Bjerre	Iceland	3 – (13'(pen.), 71', 76'(pen.))	14–2	Københavns Idrætspark, Copenhagen	Friendly	23 August 1967	
38	Erik Dyreborg	Norway	5 – (40', 41', 57', 60', 63')	5–0	Ullevaal Stadion, Oslo	1964–67 Nordic Football Championship	24 September 1967	
39	Tommy Troelsen	Norway	3 – (22', 24', 77'(pen.))	5–1	Københavns Idrætspark, Copenhagen	1968–71 Nordic Football Championship	23 June 1968	
40	Finn Wiberg	Luxembourg	3 – (15'(pen.), 35', 70'(pen.))	5–1	Københavns Idrætspark, Copenhagen	Friendly	20 November 1968	
41	Bent Jensen	Bermuda	3 – (12', 38', 85')	5–1	Bermuda National Stadium, Hamilton	Friendly	12 January 1969	
42	Bent Jensen (2)	Bermuda	3 – (37'(pen.), 68', 77')	6–0	Aalborg Stadium, Aalborg	Friendly	1 July 1969	
43	Bent Jensen (3)	Finland	3 – (12', 14', 43')	5–2	Københavns Idrætspark, Copenhagen	1968–71 Nordic Football Championship	10 September 1969	
44	Kristen Nygaard	Mexico	3 – (37', 47', 65'(pen.))	3–0	Københavns Idrætspark, Copenhagen	Friendly	16 August 1972	
45	Henning Jensen	Indonesia	3 – (17', 35', 76')	9–0	Københavns Idrætspark, Copenhagen	Friendly	3 September 1974	
46	Niels-Christian Holmstrøm	Indonesia	3 – (15', 41', 71')	9–0	Københavns Idrætspark, Copenhagen	Friendly	3 September 1974	
47	Preben Elkjær	Northern Ireland	3 – (30', 33', 83')	4–0	Københavns Idrætspark, Copenhagen	UEFA Euro 1980 qualifying	6 June 1979	
48	Michael Laudrup	Luxembourg	3 – (17', 24', 70')	6–0	Københavns Idrætspark, Copenhagen	UEFA Euro 1984 qualifying	12 October 1983	
49	Preben Elkjær (2)	Uruguay	3 – (11', 68', 80')	6–1	Estadio Neza 86, Ciudad Nezahualcóyotl	1986 FIFA World Cup Group stage	8 June 1986	
50	Ebbe Sand	Malta	3 – (8', 64', 79')	4–1	Balgarska Armia Stadium, Sofia	2002 FIFA World Cup Qualifying	24 March 2001	
51	Claus Jensen	Egypt	3 – (31', 68', 70')	4–1	Cairo International Stadium, Cairo	Friendly	12 February 2003	
52	Peter Madsen	Poland	3 – (23', 30', 90+1')	5–1	Stadion Poznań, Poznań	Friendly	18 August 2004	
53	Nicklas Bendtner	United States	3 – (33', 83', 90+1')	3–2	Aarhus Stadium, Aarhus	Friendly	25 March 2015	
54	Christian Eriksen	Bulgaria	3 – (72', 74', 82')	4–0	Suita City Football Stadium, Suita	2006 Kirin Cup Soccer Third place play-off	7 June 2016	
55	Thomas Delaney	Armenia	3 – (16', 81', 90+3')	4–1	Vazgen Sargsyan Republican Stadium, Yerevan	2018 FIFA World Cup qualification	4 September 2017	
56	Christian Eriksen (2)	Republic of Ireland	3 – (32', 63', 73')	5–1	Aviva Stadium, Dublin	2018 FIFA World Cup play-offs	14 November 2017	
57	Rasmus Højlund	Finland	3 - (21', 82', 90+3')	3–1	Parken Stadium, Copenhagen	UEFA Euro 2024 qualifying	23 March 2023	

== Statistics ==
The following table lists the number of hat-tricks scored by Danish
players who have scored two or more hat-tricks.

Multiple hat-tricks
Rank	Player	Hat-tricks
1	Poul Nielsen	8
2	Pauli Jørgensen	4
3	Ole Madsen	3
3	Bent Jensen	3
5	Vilhelm Wolfhagen	2
5	Anthon Olsen	2
5	Harald Nielsen	2
5	Preben Elkjær	2
5	Christian Eriksen	2

Hat-tricks by competition
Competition	Hat-tricks
Friendlies	31
Nordic Football Championship	9
UEFA Euro qualifying	4
UEFA Euro	0
Summer Olympics	5
FIFA World Cup qualification	3
FIFA World Cup	1
Others	3
Total	56

Hat-tricks by opponent
Rank	Opponent	Hat-tricks
1	Norway	15
2	Finland	6
3	Sweden	4
4	France	3
4	Iceland	3
4	Luxembourg	3
7	Poland	2
7	Bermuda	2
7	Greece	2
7	Germany	2
7	Indonesia	2
7	Italy	2
7	Malta	2
14	Armenia	1
14	Bulgaria	1
14	Egypt	1
14	Mexico	1
14	Netherlands	1
14	Northern Ireland	1
14	Republic of Ireland	1
14	United States	1
14	Uruguay	1
Total		57

== See also ==
- Denmark national football team
