= Bermuda national football team results (1964–1989) =

This article provides details of international football games played by the Bermuda national football team from 1964 (first match) to 1989. The matches of the Pan American Games, Central American and Caribbean Games as well as the Olympic Games qualifiers are not recorded here because they are played either by amateur teams or youth teams.

== Results ==
Win Draw Loss

=== 1964 ===
10 August Friendly	Iceland	4–3	Bermuda	Reykjavík, Iceland
	Beck 29', 54'; Schram 37', 87'	Report		Stadium: Laugardalsvöllur; Attendance: 7,500; Referee: Johan Einar Boström (Sweden)

=== 1965 ===
28 December Friendly	Bermuda	0–3	Jamaica	Bermuda
			Dunkley; Cameron; Black

=== 1968 ===
6 October 1970 FIFA World Cup qualification	Canada	4–0	Bermuda	Toronto, Canada
	Vigh 3' (pen.); Zanatta 10'; Papadakis 25', 75'	Report		Stadium: BMO Field; Attendance: 4,131; Referee: Javier Galindo Segura (Mexico)

20 October 1970 FIFA World Cup qualification	Bermuda	0–0	Canada	Devonshire Parish, Bermuda
		Report		Stadium: Bermuda National Stadium; Attendance: 5,324; Referee: Teodorus G Koestsier (Netherlands Antilles)

3 November 1970 FIFA World Cup qualification	United States	6–2	Bermuda	Kansas City, United States
	Millar 22', 63', 82'; Baker 25', 56'; Roy 60'	Report	34' Trott; 57' Best	Stadium: Municipal Stadium; Attendance: 2,235; Referee: Feliz Fingal (Netherlands Antilles)

11 November 1970 FIFA World Cup qualification	Bermuda	0–2	United States	Devonshire Parish, Bermuda
		Report	8' (o.g.) Smith; 41' Roy	Stadium: Bermuda National Stadium; Attendance: 2,942; Referee: Felipe Buergo Ercuaz (Mexico)

=== 1969 ===
12 January Friendly	Bermuda	1–5	Denmark	Hamilton, Bermuda
	Darrell	Report	Sørensen; Jensen; Holmstrøm	Attendance: 500; Referee: King (Canada)

23 June Friendly	Iceland	2–1	Bermuda	Reykjavík, Iceland
	Schram 67'; Hallgrímson 87'	Report		Stadium: Laugardalsvöllur; Attendance: 7,000; Referee: Bill Anderson (Scotland)

1 July Friendly	Denmark	6–0	Bermuda	Aalborg, Denmark
	O. Sørensen; L. Sørensen; Jensen; Michaelsen	Report		Stadium: Aalborg Stadium; Attendance: 12,200; Referee: Carlsson (Sweden)

3 July Friendly	Norway	3–0	Bermuda	Stavanger, Norway
	Dybwad-Olsen; Iversen	Report		Stadium: Stavanger Stadium; Attendance: 12,000; Referee: Bo Nilsson (Sweden)

21 October 1969 CONCACAF Championship qualification	Mexico	3–0	Bermuda	Mexico City, Mexico
	Mancilla 5', 30'; Langarica 51'	Report		Stadium: Estadio Azteca; Attendance: 40,000

2 November 1969 CONCACAF Championship qualification	Bermuda	2–1	Mexico	Devonshire Parish, Bermuda
	Brangman 36'; Dowling 61'	Report	56' Santana	Stadium: Bermuda National Stadium; Attendance: 10,000

11 November Friendly	Bermuda	3–2	Iceland	Devonshire Parish, Bermuda
		Report	33' Hallgrímsson; 73' Lárusson	Stadium: Bermuda National Stadium; Attendance: 6,000

=== 1970 ===
14 April Friendly	Haiti	1–1	Bermuda	Port au Prince, Haiti
		Report

=== 1971 ===
Unknow Friendly	Bermuda	1–1	Jamaica	Bermuda

6 October 1971 CONCACAF Championship qualification	Bermuda	0–2	Mexico	Devonshire Parish, Bermuda
		Report	44' Borja; 49' Jiménez	Stadium: Bermuda National Stadium; Referee: John di Salvatore (United States)

13 October 1971 CONCACAF Championship qualification	Mexico	4–0	Bermuda	Mexico City, Mexico
	Borja 8'; Velarde 40', 62'; López 77'	Report		Stadium: Estadio Azteca; Attendance: 1,800; Referee: Mario Canessa (Colombia)

=== 1972 ===
24 December Friendly	Bermuda	0–0	Jamaica	Bermuda

26 December Friendly	Bermuda	0–3	Jamaica	Bermuda

=== 1973 ===
17 March Friendly	Bermuda	4–0	United States	Devonshire Parish, Bermuda
		Report		Stadium: Bermuda National Stadium; Attendance: 861

9 September Friendly	United States	1–0	Bermuda	Hartford, United States
	Brewster 78'	Report		Stadium: Dillon Stadium; Attendance: 4,200

=== 1974 ===
12 April Friendly	Bermuda	0–0	Canada	Hamilton, Bermuda
		Report		Attendance: 400

26 December Friendly	Bermuda	2–1	Suriname	Bermuda

29 December Friendly	Bermuda	1–3	Suriname	Bermuda

=== 1975 ===
3 January Friendly	Bermuda	2–5	Suriname	Bermuda

26 December Friendly	Bermuda	1–5	Suriname	Bermuda

=== 1979 ===
7 October Friendly	Bermuda	1–3	United States	Devonshire Parish, Bermuda
		Report	Liveric; Makowski; Bandov	Stadium: Bermuda National Stadium; Attendance: 2,200

25 November Friendly	Bermuda	0–2	Finland	Devonshire Parish, Bermuda
		Report	45' Nieminen; 52' Himanka	Stadium: Bermuda National Stadium; Attendance: 3,000

=== 1982 ===
8 May Friendly	Trinidad and Tobago	2–2	Bermuda	Arima, Trinidad and Tobago
		Report		Stadium: Arima Municipal Stadium; Referee: Osmond Downer (Trinidad and Tobago)

12 May Friendly	Trinidad and Tobago	4–2	Bermuda	Port of Spain, Trinidad and Tobago
		Report		Referee: Lennox Sirjuesingh (Trinidad and Tobago)

15 May Friendly	Barbados	2–1	Bermuda	Bridgetown, Barbados
		Report		Referee: J. Chandler

17 May Friendly	Barbados	0–0	Bermuda	Bridgetown, Barbados
		Report		Referee: RH Barker

26 December Friendly	Bermuda	2–2	Trinidad and Tobago	Hamilton, Bermuda
		Report		Referee: AB Clift

30 December Friendly	Bermuda	2–2	Trinidad and Tobago	Hamilton, Bermuda
		Report		Referee: Charles E. Marshall (Bermuda)

=== 1988 ===
18 February Friendly	Bermuda	0–0	Canada	Devonshire Parish, Bermuda
		Report		Stadium: Bermuda National Stadium

=== 1989 ===
12 April Friendly	Barbados	1–2	Bermuda	Bridgetown, Barbados
		Report	76' Goater

14 April Friendly	Barbados	2–1 (5–3 p)	Bermuda	Bridgetown, Barbados
		Report

16 April Friendly	Trinidad and Tobago	1–1	Bermuda	Port of Spain, Trinidad and Tobago
	Lawrence	Report

18 April Friendly	Trinidad and Tobago	0–1	Bermuda	Arima, Trinidad and Tobago
		Report	Lightbourne	Stadium: Arima Municipal Stadium

14 November Friendly	United States	2–1	Bermuda	Cocoa Beach, United States
	Doyle; Eichmann	Report	Lightbourne	Attendance: 0
