= List of foreign Ligue 1 players: D =

This is a list of foreign players in the French Ligue 1, which commenced play in 1932. The following players must meet both of the following two criteria:

1. Have played at least one Ligue 1 game. Players who were signed by Ligue 1 clubs, but only played in lower league, cup and/or European games, or did not play in any competitive games at all, are not included.
2. Are considered foreign, i.e., outside France and its dependencies (Guadeloupe, Martinique, Reunion Island or French Polynesia), determined by the following:

A player is considered foreign if he is not eligible to play for the national teams of France.

More specifically,

- If a player has been capped on international level, the national team is used; if he has been capped by more than one country, the highest level (or the most recent) team is used. These include French players with dual citizenship. Players who played for France but came as foreign players (such as Miguel Ángel Lauri) are also listed.
- If a player has not been capped on international level, his country of birth is used, except those who were born abroad from French parents or moved to France at a young age, and those who clearly indicated to have switched his nationality to another nation.

Clubs listed are those that the player has played at least one Ligue 1 game for.

Seasons listed are those that the player has played at least one Ligue 1 game in. Note that seasons, not calendar years, are used. For example, "1992–95" indicates that the player has played in every season from 1992–93 to 1994–95, but not necessarily every calendar year from 1992 to 1995.

In bold: players still active in Ligue 1 and their respective teams in current season.

== Democratic Republic of Congo ==
- Chadrac Akolo – Amiens – 2019–20
- Cédric Bakambu – Sochaux, Marseille – 2010–14, 2021–22
- Simon Banza – Lens – 2020–22
- Cédric Baseya – Lille – 2008–09
- Dylan Batubinsika – Saint-Étienne – 2024–25
- Dimitry Bertaud – Montpellier – 2018–22, 2023–25
- Nill De Pauw – Guingamp – 2015–17
- Meschak Elia – Nantes – 2024–25
- Iyambo Etshele – Lille, Le Havre – 1994–96
- Roger Hitoto – Lille – 1994–97
- Jordan Ikoko – Guingamp – 2016–19
- Hérita Ilunga – Saint-Étienne, Toulouse, Rennes – 2004–09, 2012–13
- Giannelli Imbula – Marseille, Toulouse – 2013–15, 2017–18
- Eugène Kabongo – Lyon – 1989–90
- **Junior Kadile** – **Lens** – 2026–
- Gaël Kakuta – Dijon, Amiens, Lens – 2011–12, 2017–18, 2019–22
- Aldo Kalulu – Lyon, Rennes – 2015–17
- Gédéon Kalulu – Lorient – 2022–24
- Jean-Paul Kamudimba – Nice – 2003–04
- Joris Kayembe – Nantes – 2017–18
- Chiguy Lucau – Paris SG, Le Mans – 2002–03, 2005–07
- Maboula Lukunku – Lille – 2003–04
- Arnaud Lusamba – Nice – 2016–20
- Larrys Mabiala – Paris SG, Nice – 2007–12
- Makindu Makengo – Lens – 1984–87
- Harrison Manzala – Amiens, Angers – 2017–20
- Arthur Masuaku – Valenciennes, Lens – 2013–14, 2025–26
- Alain Masudi – Saint-Étienne – 1999–2000
- Franck Matingou – Bastia – 1998–2005
- Stephy Mavididi – Dijon, Montpellier – 2019–23
- Chris Mavinga – Rennes, Reims, Troyes – 2011–13, 2014–16
- Jason Mayélé – Châteauroux – 1997–98
- Nathan Mbala – Metz – 2025–26
- **Noah Mbamba** – **Lorient** – 2026–
- Chancel Mbemba – Marseille, Lille – 2022–24, 2025–26
- Dieumerci Mbokani – Monaco – 2010–11
- Nathanaël Mbuku – Reims – 2019–23
- Omenuke Mfulu – Reims – 2014–16
- Gaston Mobati – Lille – 1986–90
- Benjamin Mokulu – Bastia – 2014–15
- Cédric Mongongu – Monaco, Evian, Montpellier – 2007–15, 2016–17
- Samuel Moutoussamy – Nantes – 2017–24
- **Lionel Mpasi** – **Le Havre** – 2025–
- Firmin Mubele – Rennes, Toulouse – 2016–18
- **Ngal'ayel Mukau** – **Lille** – 2024–
- Rémi Mulumba – Lorient – 2010–13, 2015–16
- Youssouf Mulumbu – Paris SG – 2006–08
- Jean-Santos Muntubila – Sochaux – 1982–84
- Ngonda Muzinga – Dijon – 2019–21
- Arnold Mvuemba – Rennes, Lorient, Lyon – 2003–07, 2009–17
- Aristote N'Dongala – Nantes – 2013–15
- Ferris N'Goma – Brest – 2019–20
- Martin N'Kouka – Toulon – 1983–87
- Yeni Ngbakoto – Metz, Guingamp – 2014–15, 2017–19
- Granddi Ngoyi – Paris SG, Brest, Troyes – 2007–08, 2009–11, 2012–13
- Jordan Nkololo – Caen – 2015–18
- Shabani Nonda – Rennes, AS Monaco – 1998–2005
- Fabrice Nsakala – Troyes – 2011–12
- Clarck Nsikulu – Evian – 2012–15
- Vital Nsimba – Clermont – 2021–22
- Plamedi Nsingi – Nantes – 2024–25
- Kévin Pedro – Saint-Étienne – 2024–25
- Marlin Piana – Troyes – 2001–02
- Joël Sami – Nancy – 2008–13
- Marcel Tisserand – Monaco, Toulouse – 2013–17
- John Tshibumbu – Gazélec Ajaccio – 2015–16
- **Axel Tuanzebe** – **Auxerre** – 2026–
- Zico Tumba – Metz – 1996–97
- Anthony Walongwa – Nantes – 2015–18
- Yoane Wissa – Angers, Lorient – 2016–17, 2020–21
- Yannick Yenga – Le Mans – 2003–04
- Distel Zola – Nancy – 2011–12

== Denmark ==
- Henrik Agerbeck – Nantes, Sochaux – 1980–85
- Mads Albæk – Reims – 2013–15
- Joachim Andersen – Lyon – 2019–21
- Stephan Andersen – Evian – 2011–13
- Kaj Andrup – Club Français – 1932–33
- Mikkel Beck – Lille – 2000–02
- Niels Bennike – Nancy – 1954–55
- Jens Bertelsen – Rouen – 1984–85
- **Mads Bidstrup** – **Lyon** – 2026–
- **Mika Biereth** – **AS Monaco** – 2024–
- Martin Braithwaite – Toulouse, Bordeaux – 2013–18
- Helge Bronée – Nancy – 1948–50
- Andreas Bruus – Troyes – 2022–23
- Kenneth Brylle – Marseille – 1985–86
- Søren Busk – AS Monaco – 1986–87
- Kaj Christiansen – Stade Français, Le Havre – 1948–49, 1950–52
- Flemming Christensen – Saint-Étienne – 1982–83
- Denni Conteh – Strasbourg – 1997–99
- Andreas Cornelius – Bordeaux – 2018–19
- Mohamed Daramy – Reims – 2023–25
- Mikkel Desler – Toulouse – 2022–24
- Kasper Dolberg – Nice – 2019–22
- Riza Durmisi – Nice – 2019–20
- Jonathan Fischer – Metz – 2025–26
- Per Frandsen – Lille – 1990–94
- Peter Frank – Strasbourg – 1998–99
- Jakob Friis-Hansen – Lille, Bordeaux – 1989–96
- Michael Gravgaard – Nantes – 2008–09
- Albert Grønbæk – Rennes – 2024–25
- Jesper Hansen – Evian, Bastia – 2013–16
- Kaj Hansen – Stade Français, Colmar, Metz – 1947–50
- Kian Hansen – Nantes – 2014–15
- **Conrad Harder** – **Strasbourg** – 2026–
- John Helt – Sochaux – 1986–87
- **Lucas Høgsberg** – **Strasbourg** – 2025–
- **Pierre-Emile Højbjerg** – **Marseille** – 2024–
- Niels-Christian Holmstrøm – Bordeaux – 1974–77
- Lars Jacobsen – Guingamp – 2014–16
- **Elias Jelert** – **Le Havre** – 2026–
- Bent Jensen – Bordeaux – 1969–72
- Brian Jensen – Rennes, Cannes – 1994–98
- Erik Kuld Jensen – Lille, Lyon, Troyes, Marseille – 1950–53, 1954–58
- Henning-Ole Jensen – Metz – 1969–72, 1975–76
- Henrik Imre Jensen – Lille – 1989–90
- **Isak Jensen** – **Lorient** – 2026–
- Per Jensen – Saint-Étienne – 1953–54
- **Filip Jörgensen** – **Strasbourg** – 2026–
- **Thomas Jørgensen** – **Toulouse** – 2026–
- Jesper Juelsgård – Evian – 2014–15
- Thomas Kahlenberg – Auxerre, Evian – 2005–09, 2011–12
- Simon Kjær – Lille – 2013–15
- **Maurits Kjærgaard** – **Lille** – 2026–
- Søren Larsen – Toulouse – 2008–09
- Steen Larsen – Nantes – 1969–70
- Lukas Lerager – Bordeaux – 2017–19
- Søren Lerby – AS Monaco – 1986–87
- Jonas Lössl – Guingamp – 2014–16
- Henrik Lykke – Lille – 1994–95
- Emil Lyng – Lille – 2008–09, 2010–11
- Børge Mathiesen – Stade Français, Le Havre – 1947–49, 1951–53
- Henrik Meister – Rennes – 2024–25
- Allan Michaelsen – Nantes – 1970–72
- Johnny Mølby – Nantes – 1991–92
- Miklos Molnar – Saint-Étienne – 1992–94
- Younes Namli – Le Havre – 2025–26
- **Noah Nartey** – **Lyon** – 2025–
- **Rasmus Nicolaisen** – **Toulouse** – 2022–
- Benny Nielsen – Saint-Étienne – 1981–82
- Carsten Nielsen – Strasbourg – 1981–85
- Henrik Nielsen – Lille – 1990–92
- Kurt Nielsen – Marseille – 1955–56
- Michael Mio Nielsen – Lille – 1990–92
- Morten Nielsen – Strasbourg, Guingamp – 1998–02
- Nicki Bille Nielsen – Evian – 2014–15
- Svend Nielsen – CO Roubaix-Tourcoing – 1953–55
- Kristen Nygaard – Nîmes Olympique – 1983–84
- Matt O'Riley – Marseille – 2025–26
- Allan Olesen – Saint-Étienne – 2000–01
- Jesper Olsen – Bordeaux, Caen – 1989–92
- Per Pedersen – Strasbourg – 1998–99
- Dan Petersen – AS Monaco, Bastia – 1994–97, 1999–01
- Frank Pingel – Lille – 1994–95
- Christian Poulsen – Evian – 2011–12
- Jakob Poulsen – AS Monaco – 2012–13
- Kasper Schmeichel – Nice – 2022–23
- Ronnie Schwartz – Guingamp – 2014–15
- John Sivebæk – Saint-Étienne, AS Monaco – 1987–92
- Tom Søndergaard – Metz – 1970–72
- Arne Sørensen – Stade Français, Nancy – 1947–49
- Erling Sørensen – Strasbourg – 1949
- Jørn Sørensen – Metz – 1961–62
- Anders Sundstrup – Sochaux – 1986–87
- **Casper Tengstedt** – **Toulouse** – 2026–
- Nicolaj Thomsen – Nantes – 2016–17
- Kim Vilfort – Lille – 1985–86
- Daniel Wass – Evian – 2011–15
- Finn Wiberg – Nancy – 1970–72

== Dominican Republic ==
- Mariano Díaz – Lyon – 2017–19
- Pablo Rosario – Nice – 2021–26

== References and notes ==
=== Books ===
- Barreaud, Marc (1998). Dictionnaire des footballeurs étrangers du championnat professionnel français (1932-1997). L'Harmattan, Paris. ISBN 2-7384-6608-7.
- Tamás Dénes; Pál Peterdi; Zoltán Rochy; József Selmeci (1999). Kalandozó magyar labdarúgók. ISBN 963-85967-0-8.

=== Club pages ===
- AJ Auxerre former players
- AJ Auxerre former players
- Girondins de Bordeaux former players
- Girondins de Bordeaux former players
- Les ex-Tangos (joueurs), Stade Lavallois former players
- Olympique Lyonnais former players
- Olympique de Marseille former players
- FC Metz former players
- AS Monaco FC former players
- Ils ont porté les couleurs de la Paillade... Montpellier HSC Former players
- AS Nancy former players
- FC Nantes former players
- Paris SG former players
- Red Star Former players
- Red Star former players
- Stade de Reims former players
- Stade Rennais former players
- CO Roubaix-Tourcoing former players
- AS Saint-Étienne former players
- Sporting Toulon Var former players

=== Others ===
- stat2foot
- footballenfrance
- French Clubs' Players in European Cups 1955-1995, RSSSF
- Finnish players abroad, RSSSF
- Italian players abroad, RSSSF
- Romanians who played in foreign championships
- Swiss players in France, RSSSF
- EURO 2008 CONNECTIONS: FRANCE, Stephen Byrne Bristol Rovers official site

== Notes ==
1. Born in Angola
2. Born in Belgium
3. Born in Burundi
4. Born in England
5. Born in France
6. Born in the Netherlands
7. Born in Spain
8. Born in Sweden
9. Capped for the Belgium national football team
10. Capped for the Belgium national under-21 football team
11. Capped for the Belgium national under-19 football team
12. Capped for the Belgium national under-18 football team
13. Capped for the Belgium national under-17 football team
14. Capped for the Belgium national under-16 football team
15. Capped for the England national under-21 football team
16. Capped for the England national under-20 football team
17. Capped for the England national under-19 football team
18. Capped for the France national under-16 football team
19. Capped for the France national under-17 football team
20. Capped for the France national under-18 football team
21. Capped for the France national under-19 football team
22. Capped for the France national under-20 football team
23. Capped for the France national under-21 football team
24. Capped for the France national under-23 football team
25. Capped for the Netherlands national football team
26. Capped for the Netherlands national under-21 football team
27. Capped for the Netherlands national under-20 football team
28. Capped for the Netherlands national under-19 football team
29. Capped for the Netherlands national under-16 football team
30. Capped for the Sweden men's national under-17 football team
31. Capped for the Sweden national under-16 football team
