= 1966 FIFA World Cup qualification – UEFA Group 7 =

Football tournament

The four teams in this group played against each other on a home-and-away basis. The winner Soviet Union qualified for the eighth FIFA World Cup held in England.

== Standings ==
Pos	Team	Pld	W	D	L	GF	GA	GD	Pts	Qualification	(Soviet Union national football team)	(Wales national football team)	(Greece national football team)	(Denmark national football team)
1	Soviet Union	6	5	0	1	19	6	+13	10	Qualification for 1966 FIFA World Cup	—	2–1	3–1	6–0
2	Wales	6	3	0	3	11	9	+2	6		2–1	—	4–1	4–2
3	Greece	6	2	1	3	10	14	−4	5		1–4	2–0	—	4–2
4	Denmark	6	1	1	4	7	18	−11	3		1–3	1–0	1–1	—

Source: AllWorldCup
Rules for classification: Tiebreakers

== Matches ==
21 October 1964

Denmark	1–0	Wales
Madsen 47'	Report

Copenhagen, Denmark
Attendance: 22,800
Referee: Othmar Huber (Switzerland)

29 November 1964

Greece	4–2	Denmark
Sideris 30', 46'; Papaioannou 71', 85'	Report	Berg 60'; Madsen 70'

Athens, Greece
Attendance: 21,748
Referee: István Zsolt (Hungary)

9 December 1964

Greece	2–0	Wales
Papaioannou 4'; Papaemmanouil 47'	Report

Athens, Greece
Attendance: 20,769
Referee: Wacław Majdan (Poland)

17 March 1965

Wales	4–1	Greece
Allchurch 26', 74'; England 51'; Vernon 65'	Report	Papaioannou 60'

Cardiff, Wales
Attendance: 11,159
Referee: Piet Roomer (Netherlands)

23 May 1965

Soviet Union	3–1	Greece
Kazakov 14'; Ivanov 71', 83'	Report	Papaioannou 60'

Moscow, Soviet Union
Attendance: 79,641
Referee: Erik Beijar (Finland)

30 May 1965

Soviet Union	2–1	Wales
Ivanov 39'; Williams 48' (o.g.)	Report	W. Davies 69'

Central Lenin Stadium, Moscow, Soviet Union
Attendance: 86,015
Referee: Helmut Fritz (West Germany)

27 June 1965

Soviet Union	6–0	Denmark
Khusainov 9'; Metreveli 47'; Voronin 64'; Barkaya 69', 77'; Meskhi 72'	Report

Moscow, Soviet Union
Attendance: 84,134
Referee: Konstantin Zečević (Yugoslavia)

3 October 1965

Greece	1–4	Soviet Union
Papaioannou 27'	Report	Metreveli 14' (pen.); Banişevski 25', 59', 82'

Athens, Greece
Attendance: 39,880
Referee: Aharon Shoshany (Israel)

17 October 1965

Denmark	1–3	Soviet Union
Troelsen 79'	Report	Metreveli 47'; Malofeyev 62'; Sabo 68'

Copenhagen, Denmark
Attendance: 32,941
Referee: Archie Webster (Scotland)

27 October 1965

Denmark	1–1	Greece
Fritsen 12'	Report	Sideris 45'

Copenhagen, Denmark
Attendance: 28,600
Referee: Owen McCarthy (Republic of Ireland)

27 October 1965

Wales	2–1	Soviet Union
Vernon 20'; Allchurch 77'	Report	Banişevski 17'

Cardiff, Wales
Attendance: 24,626
Referee: Birger Nilsen (Norway)

1 December 1965

Wales	4–2	Denmark
W. Davies 2'; Vernon 11', 79'; Rees 18'	Report	Poulsen 4'; Fritsen 48'

Wrexham, Wales
Attendance: 4,839
Referee: Michel Kitabdjian (France)
