= Egon Hansen =

- Egon Hansen (footballer) (born 1937), Danish footballer
- Egon Hansen (sport shooter) (1931–2002), Danish sport shooter
