= Árpád Fazekas =

Árpád Fazekas is the name of:

- Árpád Fazekas (footballer, born 1930), Hungarian footballer
- Árpád Fazekas (footballer, born 1949), Romanian footballer
