= List of international goals scored by Poul Nielsen =

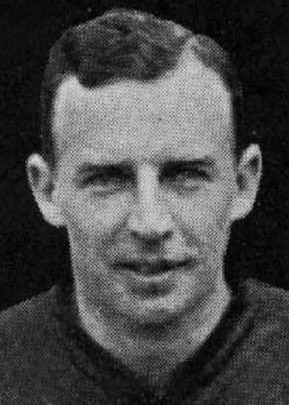
Nielsen in 1912

Poul Nielsen was a footballer who represented the Denmark national football team as a striker between 1910 and 1925. He scored his first international goal on 2 July 1912 in a 4–1 win over the Netherlands at the 1912 Summer Olympics semi-finals. Since then, he has become his country's all-time top scorer in international football, with 52 goals in just 38 appearances.

On 5 October 1913, Nielsen scored his first international hat-trick against Sweden during a friendly match, netting 6 goals in a 10–0 win. He has scored a national record of eight international hat-tricks (5 of which against Norway), and besides his 6-goal haul against Sweden, he has also netted five international goals in just over 10 minutes in a match against Norway on 7 October 1917.

== International goals ==
Scores and results list Denmark's goal tally first and score column indicates the score after each Nielsen goal.

List of international goals scored by Poul Nielsen
No.	Cap	Date	Venue	Opponent	Score	Result	Competition	Ref
1	3	2 July 1912	Stockholm Olympic Stadium, Stockholm, Sweden	Netherlands	3–0	4–1	1912 Summer Olympics semi-finals	
2	4	25 May 1913	Idrætspark, Copenhagen, Denmark	Sweden	5–0	8–0	Friendly	
3	5	5 October 1913	Stockholm Olympic Stadium, Stockholm, Sweden	Sweden	1–0	10–0	Friendly	
4	5	5 October 1913	Stockholm Olympic Stadium, Stockholm, Sweden	Sweden	2–0	10–0	Friendly	
5	5	5 October 1913	Stockholm Olympic Stadium, Stockholm, Sweden	Sweden	3–0	10–0	Friendly	
6	5	5 October 1913	Stockholm Olympic Stadium, Stockholm, Sweden	Sweden	5–0	10–0	Friendly	
7	5	5 October 1913	Stockholm Olympic Stadium, Stockholm, Sweden	Sweden	6–0	10–0	Friendly	
8	5	5 October 1913	Stockholm Olympic Stadium, Stockholm, Sweden	Sweden	7–0	10–0	Friendly	
9	6	26 October 1913	Stadion Hoheluft, Hamburg, Germany	Germany	1–0	4–1	Friendly	
10	6	26 October 1913	Stadion Hoheluft, Hamburg, Germany	Germany	2–0	4–1	Friendly	
11	6	26 October 1913	Stadion Hoheluft, Hamburg, Germany	Germany	3–0	4–1	Friendly	
12	6	26 October 1913	Stadion Hoheluft, Hamburg, Germany	Germany	4–1	4–1	Friendly	
13	7	17 May 1914	Idrætspark, Copenhagen, Denmark	Netherlands	1–1	4–3	Friendly	
14	7	17 May 1914	Idrætspark, Copenhagen, Denmark	Netherlands	2–3	4–3	Friendly	
15	7	17 May 1914	Idrætspark, Copenhagen, Denmark	Netherlands	4–3	4–3	Friendly	
16	8	5 June 1914	Idrætspark, Copenhagen, Denmark	England (amateurs)	3–0	3–0	Friendly	
17	9	6 June 1915	Idrætspark, Copenhagen, Denmark	Sweden	2–0	2–0	Friendly	
18	10	19 September 1915	Idrætspark, Copenhagen, Denmark	Norway	1–1	8–1	Friendly	
19	10	19 September 1915	Idrætspark, Copenhagen, Denmark	Norway	3–1	8–1	Friendly	
20	10	19 September 1915	Idrætspark, Copenhagen, Denmark	Norway	6–1	8–1	Friendly	
21	11	31 October 1915	Stockholm Olympic Stadium, Stockholm, Sweden	Sweden	1–0	2–0	Friendly	
22	12	4 June 1916	Idrætspark, Copenhagen, Denmark	Sweden	1–0	2–0	Friendly	
23	12	4 June 1916	Idrætspark, Copenhagen, Denmark	Sweden	2–0	2–0	Friendly	
24	14	15 October 1916	Idrætspark, Copenhagen, Denmark	Norway	4–0	8–0	Friendly	
25	14	15 October 1916	Idrætspark, Copenhagen, Denmark	Norway	5–0	8–0	Friendly	
26	14	15 October 1916	Idrætspark, Copenhagen, Denmark	Norway	6–0	8–0	Friendly	
27	14	15 October 1916	Idrætspark, Copenhagen, Denmark	Norway	8–0	8–0	Friendly	
28	16	7 October 1917	Idrætspark, Copenhagen, Denmark	Norway	7–0	12–0	Friendly	
29	16	7 October 1917	Idrætspark, Copenhagen, Denmark	Norway	8–0	12–0	Friendly	
30	16	7 October 1917	Idrætspark, Copenhagen, Denmark	Norway	9–0	12–0	Friendly	
31	16	7 October 1917	Idrætspark, Copenhagen, Denmark	Norway	10–0	12–0	Friendly	
32	16	7 October 1917	Idrætspark, Copenhagen, Denmark	Norway	11–0	12–0	Friendly	
33	18	6 October 1918	Idrætspark, Copenhagen, Denmark	Norway	4–0	4–0	Friendly	
34	19	5 June 1919	Idrætspark, Copenhagen, Denmark	Sweden	1–0	4–0	Friendly	
35	19	5 June 1919	Idrætspark, Copenhagen, Denmark	Sweden	3–0	4–0	Friendly	
36	20	12 June 1919	Idrætspark, Copenhagen, Denmark	Norway	3–2	5–1	Friendly	
37	20	12 June 1919	Idrætspark, Copenhagen, Denmark	Norway	4–1	5–1	Friendly	
38	20	12 June 1919	Idrætspark, Copenhagen, Denmark	Norway	5–1	5–1	Friendly	
39	21	21 September 1919	Gressbanen, Christiania, Norway	Norway	1–1	3–2	Friendly	
40	21	21 September 1919	Gressbanen, Christiania, Norway	Norway	2–1	3–2	Friendly	
41	23	2 October 1921	Idrætspark, Copenhagen, Denmark	Norway	1–0	3–1	Friendly	
42	23	2 October 1921	Idrætspark, Copenhagen, Denmark	Norway	2–0	3–1	Friendly	
43	23	2 October 1921	Idrætspark, Copenhagen, Denmark	Norway	3–1	3–1	Friendly	
44	28	10 September 1922	Old Fredrikstad Stadion, Fredrikstad, Norway	Norway	2–1	3–3	Friendly	
45	28	10 September 1922	Old Fredrikstad Stadion, Fredrikstad, Norway	Norway	3–2	3–3	Friendly	
46	29	1 October 1922	Idrætspark, Copenhagen, Denmark	Sweden	1–1	1–2	Friendly	
47	34	14 September 1924	Gressbanen, Christiania, Norway	Norway	2–1	3–1	1924–28 Nordic Football Championship	
48	34	14 September 1924	Gressbanen, Christiania, Norway	Norway	3–1	3–1	1924–28 Nordic Football Championship	
49	35	5 October 1924	Idrætspark, Copenhagen, Denmark	Belgium	1–0	2–1	Friendly	
50	35	5 October 1924	Idrætspark, Copenhagen, Denmark	Belgium	2–0	2–1	Friendly	
51	36	14 June 1925	Stockholm Olympic Stadium, Stockholm, Sweden	Sweden	2–0	2–0	1924–28 Nordic Football Championship	
52	37	21 June 1925	Idrætspark, Copenhagen, Denmark	Norway	2–0	5–1	1924–28 Nordic Football Championship	

== Hat-tricks ==
No.	Date	Venue	Opponent	Goals	Result	Competition	Ref.
1	5 October 1913	Stockholm Olympic Stadium, Stockholm, Sweden	Sweden	6 – (5', 10', 29', 47', 50', 53')	10–0	Friendly	
2	26 October 1913	Stadion Hoheluft, Hamburg, Germany	Germany	4 – (5', 7', 42', 87')	4–1	Friendly	
3	17 May 1914	Idrætspark, Copenhagen, Denmark	Netherlands	3 – (20', 63', 69')	4–3	Friendly	
4	19 September 1915	Idrætspark, Copenhagen, Denmark	Norway	3 – (23', 37', 71')	8–1	Friendly	
5	15 October 1916	Idrætspark, Copenhagen, Denmark	Norway	4 – (25', 40', 47', 70')	8–0	Friendly	
6	7 October 1917	Idrætspark, Copenhagen, Denmark	Norway	5 – (71', 75', 77', 78', 81')	12–0	Friendly	
7	12 June 1919	Idrætspark, Copenhagen, Denmark	Norway	3 – (24', 42', 59')	5–1	Friendly	
8	2 October 1921	Idrætspark, Copenhagen, Denmark	Norway	3 – (7', 51', 75')	3–1	Friendly	

== Statistics ==
Denmark national team
Year	Apps	Goals
1910	1	0
1911	1	0
1912	1	1
1913	3	11
1914	2	4
1915	3	5
1916	3	6
1917	3	5
1918	1	1
1919	4	7
1921	2	3
1922	5	3
1923	3	0
1924	3	4
1925	3	2
Total	38	52

Goals by competition
Competition	Goals
Friendlies	47
1912 Summer Olympics	1
1924–28 Nordic Football Championship	4
Total	52

== See also ==
- List of men's footballers with 50 or more international goals
