= Zentralstadion (1956) =

Former stadium in Leipzig, Germany

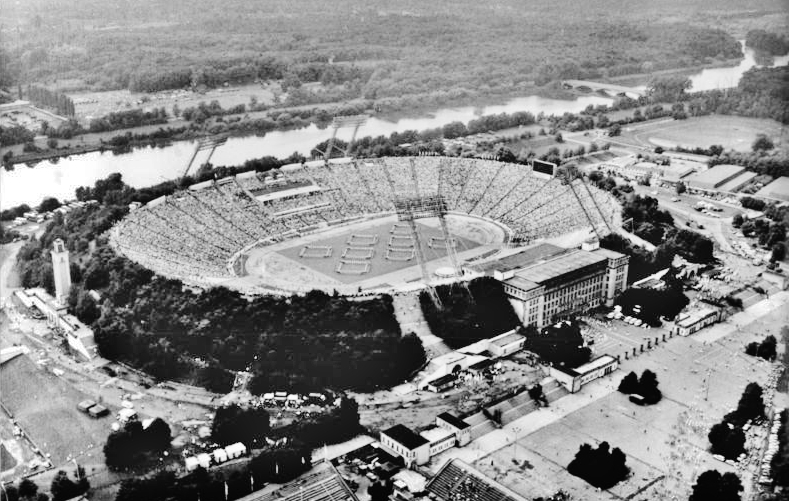
- Interactive map of Zentralstadion
- Full name: Zentralstadion
- Former names: Frankfurter Wiesen; Stadion der Hunderttausend; Sportforum Leipzig
- Location: Leipzig, Germany, locality Zentrum-Nordwest
- Coordinates: 51°20′44.86″N 12°20′53.59″E
- Owner: German Democratic Republic
- Operator: Leipzig
- Capacity: 120,000
- Record attendance: 100,000 (SC Rotation Leipzig - SC Lokomotive Leipzig, 9 September 1956)

Construction
- Built: 4 March 1955; 71 years ago
- Opened: 4 August 1956; 70 years ago
- Closed: 2000
- Demolished: Seats, fences and floodlights only
- Cost: $9 million
- Architects: Werner March (sketch); Eitel Jackowski (complete); Heinz Schütze (complete); Rudolf Lossner (buildings)
- Project manager: Walter Ulbricht

Tenants
- Deutscher Turn- und Sportbund; DHfK Leipzig; VfB Leipzig (1992–1995); Trade Sports- Associations of sports societies in the GDR

Central Stadium (German: Zentralstadion, pronounced [tsɛnˈtra:lˈʃta:di̯ɔn]) was a stadium with a capacity of 120,000 in Leipzig which was initially used for matches of SC Rotation Leipzig.

About 1.5 million cubic metres of debris from the World War II bombing of Leipzig was used in the stadium's construction. Its name derives from the Soviet "Central Stadium".

== Background ==
After the 1896 Summer Olympics, the city of Leipzig began to plan a stadium. The Zentralstadion was built first for the sports students in the Sportforum Leipzig, with a capacity of 100,000. Next to it was an Olympic-style swimming stadium. After the sports university, rowing channel and the swimming stadium were established, plans were made for a new stadium downtown; Leipzig wanted to be awarded the Olympic Games. Blueprints by architect Werner March, the architect of Berlin's Olympiastadion, were used. Finishing the plan took 15 months, with 180,000 volunteers. Walter Ulbricht called the stadium "Stadion der Hunderttausend" (Stadium of 100,000), and made it the home of the German Gym and Sports Celebrations.

== Construction ==
=== Part of Sports Forum Leipzig ===
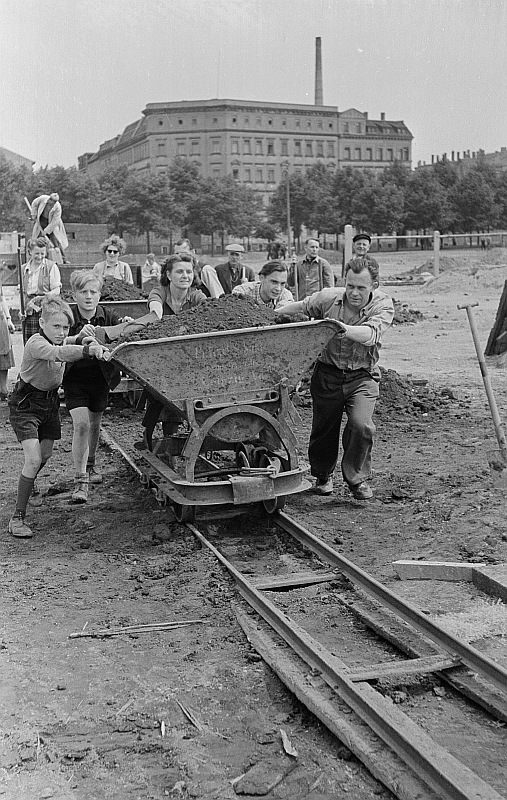
Volunteers moving earth for the stadium in 1952

After the War of the Fourth Coalition, educators Ernst Moritz Arndt and Friedrich Ludwig Jahn wanted German national sports celebrations to train the Lützow Free Corps to defend against the French. Leipzig became one of the wealthiest cities in Germany, with a number of sports festivals; the only larger sports gathering was the 1936 Summer Olympics. Leader Walter Ulbricht wanted a national-class stadium to commemorate the 100,000 fallen soldiers in the Battle of Leipzig.

Free German Youth regional leader Heinz Haferkorn was tasked with finding 200 volunteers per day, and work on the stadium began on August 2, 1955. To save money, debris from the 1945 bombings was used. Its architect of record was Karl Souradny, who only completed the ground drawings and never visited the site. A total of 180,000 volunteers worked for 735,992 hours on the stadium, which cost M28 million (DM5.6 million). A small train brought debris to the stadium, which was mixed with ash, soil and water and compressed into bricks.

=== Replacement ===
In 1990, due to riots in other European countries and in Leipzig's Alfred-Kunze-Sportpark, access to Zentralstadion was banned to reduce further rioting. The bell in the stadium's Werner Seelenbinder Tower was silenced.

Due to the rising maintenance costs, the city decided to build a smaller, soccer-only stadium in 1997. According to critics, Berlin's similar-size Olympiastadion was renovated at the same time and the Zentralstadion could have been saved. Germany won the right to host the 2006 FIFA World Cup in 2000, prompting renovation of many German soccer-specific stadiums (including the Olympiastadion).

== Gallery ==
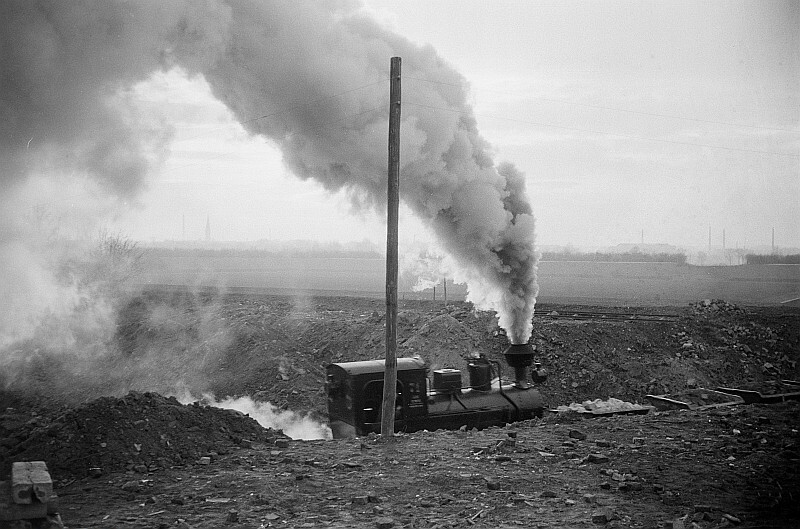
Moving construction material

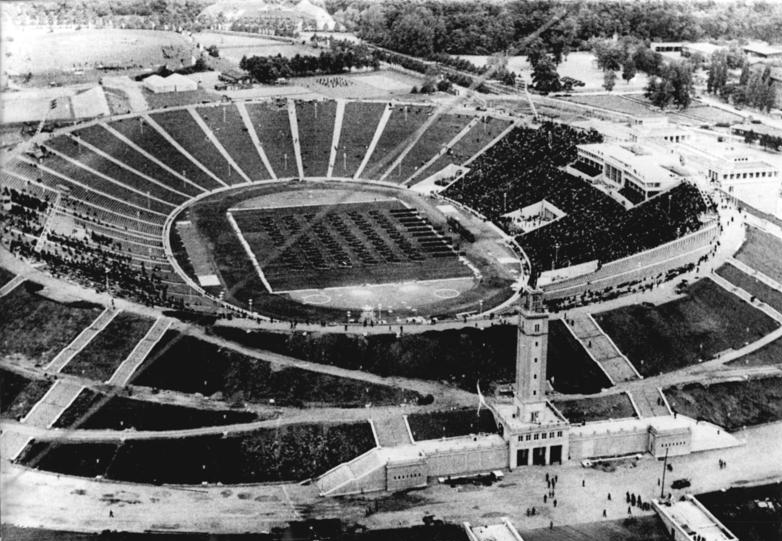
Aerial photo in 1956

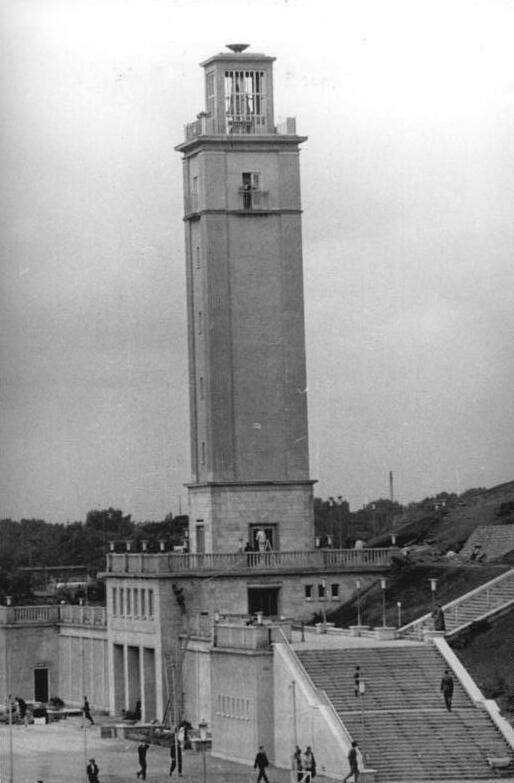
The Werner Seelenbinder clock tower

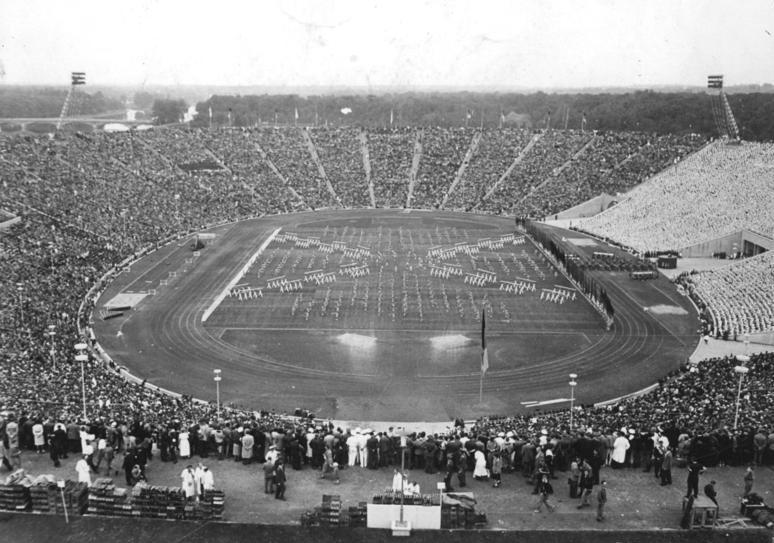
The Zentralstadion packed with spectators on 4 August 1956

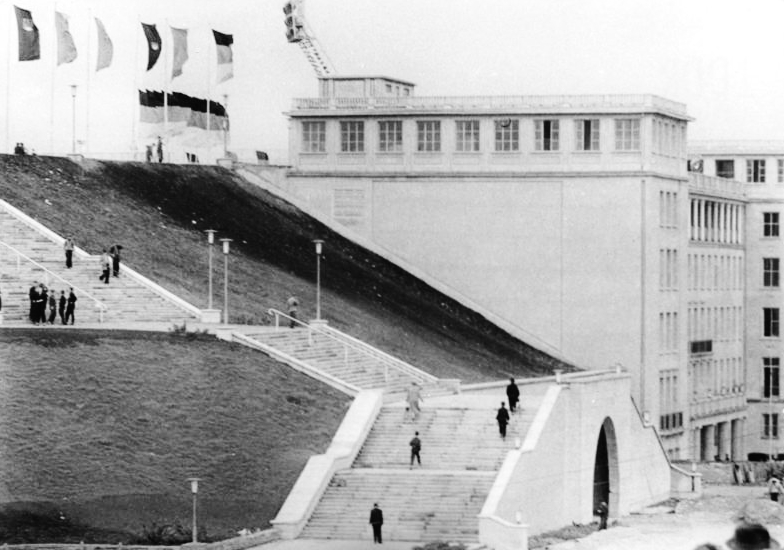
The main entrance

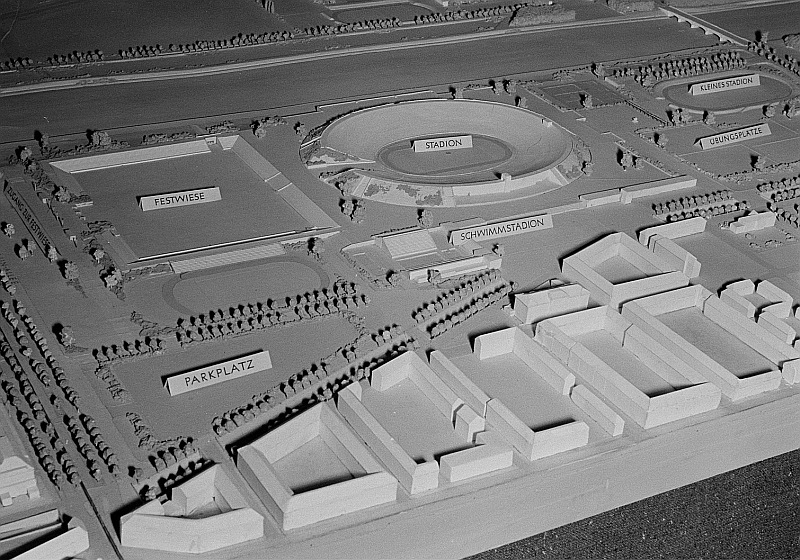
Model of the Sportsforum

== International Soccer Matches of the East Germany national football team ==
Between 1957 and 2004, all matches were broadcast by the Deutscher Fernsehfunk and later Eurosport. 2,812,000 visitors came to the matches in all. The Soviet Union was the team with the most matches as foreign team here. The average of the visitor numbers is 63,909 without club team matches, Spartakiade and the East German Sports Festival. The East Germany national team won 20 matches with 13 drawns and 10 defeats. One match was hosted as national stadium for Poland. 21 matches took place as qualifying matches. 23 matches were exhibition matches.

Date	Local time	Home	Final score (halftime score)	Visitor	Game type	Attendance
1957-05-19	**:**	East Germany	2:1 (1:1) Goals scored:Charles (WAL) 6', Wirth (GDR) 21', Tröger (GDR) 61′	Wales	1958 FIFA World Cup qualification – Referee: Nikolay Latyshev (Soviet Union)	105,000
1957-10-27	**:**	East Germany	1:4 (1:3) Goals scored: Kraus (TCH) 4′, Moravčík (TCH) 23', Müller (GDR) 23′, Novák (TCH) 43', Kraus (TCH) 88′	(Czech Republic) Czechoslovakia	1958 FIFA World Cup qualification – Referee: Pierre Schwinte (France)	110,000
1957-11-09	**:**	Poland	0:2 (0:1) Goals scored: Streltsov (URS) 31′, Fiedosov (URS) 75′	Soviet Union	1958 FIFA World Cup qualification – Referee: Clough John Harold (England)	110,000
1958-09-14	**:**	East Germany	3:2 (1:1) Goals scored: Schröter (GDR) 25′, Penalty Constantin (ROU) 27′, Penalty Assmy (GDR) 57′, Ene (ROU) 61′, Wirth (GDR) 76′	Romania	Exhibition match – Referee: Nikolai Balakin (Soviet Union)	60,000
1958-11-02	**:**	East Germany	4:1 (2:1) Goals scored: Assmy (GDR) 4′, Müller (GDR) 12′, Hennum (NOR) 42′, Schröter (GDR) 56′, Müller (GDR) 65′	Norway	Exhibition match – Referee: Antonín Vrbovec (Czech Republic)	60,000
1959-08-12	**:**	East Germany	2:1 (2:0) Goals scored: Schröter (GDR) 3′, Franz (GDR) 44′, Kadraba (TCH) 53′	Czechoslovakia	Exhibition match – Referee: Nikolai Latychev (Soviet Union)	100,000
1960-08-17	**:**	East Germany	0:1 (0:0) Goals scored: Ponedelnik (URS) 75′	(Soviet Union) USSR	Exhibition match – Referee: Josef Stoll (Austria)	70,000
1961-05-14	**:**	East Germany	1:1 (0:0) Goals scored: Groot (NED) 63′, Erler (GDR) 80′	Netherlands	1962 FIFA World Cup qualification – Referee: Carl Jorgensen (Denmark)	70,000
1961-05-14	**:**	East Germany	4:1 (2:1) Goals scored: Schröter (GDR) 8′, Madsen (DEN) 20′, Ducke (GDR) 29′, Schröter (GDR) 56′, Schröter (GDR) 88′	Denmark	Exhibition match – Referee: Józef Kowal (Poland)	30,000
1961-05-14	**:**	East Germany	2:2 (0:2) Goals scored: Zambata (YUG) 20′, Jerković (YUG) 43′, Wirth (GDR) 45′, Schröter (GDR) 52′	(Socialist Federal Republic of Yugoslavia) Yugoslavia	Exhibition match – Referee: Václav Korelus (Czechoslovakia)	35,000
1964-05-23	**:**	East Germany	1:1 (?:?) Goals scored: ? (GDR) ?′, ? (URS) ?′	(Soviet Union) USSR	Exhibition match – Referee: ?	80,000
1965-05-23	**:**	East Germany	1:1 (1:1) Goals scored: Vogel (GDR) 17′, Bene (HUN) 28′	Hungary	1966 FIFA World Cup qualification – Referee: Fredrik Johansson (Sweden)	110,000
1965-10-31	**:**	East Germany	1:0 (1:0) Goals scored: Nöldner (GDR) 1′	(Austria) AUT	1966 FIFA World Cup qualification – Referee: Samuel Carswell (Northern Ireland)	95,000
1966-04-27	**:**	East Germany	4:1 (3:1) Goals scored: Ducke (GDR) 2′, Nöldner (GDR) 23′, Kindvall (SWE) 43′, Frenzel (GDR) 57′	Sweden	Exhibition match – Referee: Laurens van Ravens (Netherlands)	50,000
1966-07-02	**:**	East Germany	5:2 (2:0) Goals scored: Nöldner (GDR) 3′, Frenzel (GDR) 44′, Tobar (CHI) 62′, Vogel (GDR) 72′, Fräßdorf (GDR) 79′, Marcos (CHI) 81′, Geisler (GDR) 86′	Chile	Exhibition match – Referee: Per Engblom (Finland)	45,000
1967-04-05	**:**	East Germany	4:3 (0:2) Goals scored: Mulder (NED) 10′, Keizer (NED) 12′, Vogel (GDR) 50′, Frenzel (GDR) 62′, Keizer (NED) 65′, Frenzel (GDR) 69′, Frenzel (GDR) 85′	Netherlands	UEFA Euro 1968 qualifying – Referee: Hannes Sigurðsson (Iceland)	40,000
1967-10-11	17:00	East Germany	3:2 (1:2) Goals scored: Dyreborg (DEN) 25′, Körner (GDR) 35′, Søndergaard (DEN) 38′, Pankau (GDR) 59′, Pankau (GDR) 73′	Denmark	UEFA Euro 1968 qualifying – Referee: Ryszard Banasiuk (Poland)	25,000
1967-10-29	14:00	East Germany	1:0 (0:0) Goals scored: Frenzel (GDR) 51′	Hungary	UEFA Euro 1968 qualifying – Referee: Robert Helies (France)	110,000
1968-04-24	**:**	East Germany	3:2 (?:?) Goals scored: ?	Bulgaria	? – Referee: ?	35,000
1969-07-25	**:**	East Germany	2:2 (1:1) Goals scored: Löwe (GDR) 6′, Löwe (GDR) 6′, Puzach (URS) 35′, Khmelnytskyi (URS) 59′, Frenzel (GDR) 87′	Soviet Union	Exhibition match – Referee: Gyula Emsberger (Hungary)	90,000
1971-05-09	15:00	East Germany	1:2 (0:2) Goals scored: Filipović (YUG) 11′, Džajić (YUG) 19′, Puzach (YUG) 35′, Löwe (GDR) 70′	(Socialist Federal Republic of Yugoslavia) Yugoslavia	UEFA Euro 1972 qualifying – Referee: Paul Schiller (Austria)	100,000
1971-09-18	**:**	East Germany	1:1 (0:0) Goals scored: Borja (MEX) 50′, Löwe (GDR) 80′	Mexico	Exhibition match – Referee: Gyula Emsberger (Hungary)	20,000
1972-05-27	**:**	East Germany	1:0 (0:0) Goals scored: Irmscher (GDR) 81′	Uruguay	Exhibition match – Referee: Bohumil Smejkal (Czech Republic)	20,000
1973-03-26	**:**	East Germany	2:0 (?:?) Goals scored: ?	Romania	Exhibition match – Referee: ?	95,000
1974-05-29	**:**	East Germany	1:1 (0:0) Goals scored: Streich (GDR) 66', Channon (ENG) 68'	England	Exhibition match – Referee: György Müncz (Hungary)	100,000
1974-12-07	17:30	East Germany	0:0 (0:0) Goals scored: 0	Belgium	UEFA Euro 1976 qualifying – Referee: Sergio Gonella (Italy)	35,000
1975-10-12	14:30	East Germany	2:1 (0:0) Goals scored: Bathenay (FRA) 50′, Streich (GDR) 55′, Vogel (GDR) 77′	France	UEFA Euro 1976 qualifying – Referee: Erik Fredriksson (Sweden)	35,000
1976-04-07	**:**	East Germany	0:0 (0:0) Goals scored: 0	(Czech Republic) Czechoslovakia	Football at the 1976 Summer Olympics – Men's qualification – Referee: Vladimir Rudnev (Soviet Union)	45,000
1977-07-28	**:**	East Germany	2:1 (1:1) Goals scored: Häfner (GDR) 8', Bubnov (USSR) 22', Sparwasser (GDR) 90'	Soviet Union	Exhibition match – Referee: Marian Kuston (Poland)	95,000
1977-10-12	**:**	East Germany	1:1 (0:1) Goals scored: Hattenberger (AUT) 43', Löwe (GDR) 50'	Austria	1978 FIFA World Cup qualification – Referee: Ian Foote (Scotland)	100,000
1978-04-04	**:**	East Germany	0:1 (0:0) Goals scored: Åslund (SWE) 75'	Sweden	Exhibition match – Referee: Bogdan Dotchev (Bulgaria)	25,000
1978-09-06	**:**	East Germany	2:1 (1:0) Goals scored: Pommerenke (GDR) 20', Eigendorf (GDR) 66', Ondruš (TCH) 84'	Czechoslovakia	Exhibition match – Referee: Franz Wöhrer (Austria)	15,000
1979-04-18	**:**	East Germany	2:1 (0:1) Goals scored: Boniek (POL) 7', Streich (GDR) 50', Lindemann (GDR) 63'	Poland	UEFA Euro 1980 qualifying – Referee: Azim Zade (Soviet Union)	55,000
1979-11-21	17:00	East Germany	2:3 (2:1) Goals scored: Schnuphase (GDR) 17', Streich (GDR) 33', Thijssen (NED) 45', Kist (NED) 50', R. van de Kerkhof (NED) 67'	Netherlands	UEFA Euro 1980 qualifying – Referee: António Garrido (Portugal)	100,000
1980-04-16	**:**	East Germany	2:0 (0:0) Goals scored: Weber (GDR) 64', Streich (GDR) 69'	Greece	Exhibition match – Referee: Torben Månsson (Denmark)	20,000
1980-10-15	**:**	East Germany	0:0 (0:0) Goals scored:0	Spain	Exhibition match – Referee: Jan Veverka (Czechoslovakia)	30,000
1981-10-10	**:**	East Germany	2:3 (0:2) Goals scored: Szarmach (POL) 2', Smolarek (POL) 5', Schnuphase (GDR) 53', Smolarek (POL) 62', Streich (GDR) 63'	Poland	1982 FIFA World Cup qualification – Referee: Augusto Lamo Castillo (Spain)	85,000
1982-04-14	**:**	East Germany	1:0 (1:0) Goals scored: Hause (GDR) 20'	Italy	Exhibition match – Referee: Dusan Krchnak (Czechoslovakia)	28,000
1983-03-30	17:00	East Germany	1:2 (0:1) Goals scored: Van der Elst (BEL) 35', Vandenbergh (BEL) 70', Streich (GDR) 82'	Belgium	UEFA Euro 1984 qualifying Group 1 – Referee: John Carpenter (Republic of Ireland)	75,000
1983-06-26	**:**	East Germany	1:3 (1:2) Goals scored: Blokhin (URS) 10', Streich (GDR) 24', Oganesyan (URS) 35', Yevtushenko (URS) 64'	Soviet Union	Exhibition match – Referee: Károly Palotai (Hungary)	70,000
1984-10-20	**:**	East Germany	2:3 (1:1) Goals scored: Glowatzky (GDR) 11', Baždarević (YUG) 30', Vokri (YUG) 48', Ernst (GDR) 59', Šestić (YUG) 80'	(Socialist Federal Republic of Yugoslavia) Yugoslavia	1986 FIFA World Cup qualification – Referee: Horst Brummeier (Austria)	63,000
1985-09-11	**:**	East Germany	2:0 (0:0) Goals scored: Ernst (GDR) 53', Kreer (GDR) 81'	France	1986 FIFA World Cup qualification – Referee: Pietro D'Elia (Italy)	78,000
1987-07-28	**:**	East Germany	0:0 (0:0) Goals scored: 0	Hungary	Exhibition match – Referee: Jan Damgaard (Denmark)	71,000
1989-05-20	**:**	East Germany	1:1 (0:1) Goals scored: Polster (AUT) 3', Kirsten (GDR) 86'	Austria	1990 FIFA World Cup qualification – Referee: Alphonse Constantin (Belgium)	22,000

== German Sports Festival (National Olympics for East Germans) ==
During this festival came at least 150,000.

- 1956 (2.–5. August): II. Deutsches Turn- und Sportfest
- 1959 (13.–16. August): III. Deutsches Turn- und Sportfest
- 1963 (1.–4. August): IV. Deutsches Turn- und Sportfest
- 1969 (24.–27. July): V. Turn- und Sportfest der DDR
- 1977 (25.–31. July): VI. Turn- und Sportfest der DDR und VI. Kinder- und Jugendspartakiade
- 1983 (25.–31. July): VII. Turn- und Sportfest der DDR und IX. Kinder- und Jugendspartakiade
- 1987 (27. July–2. August): VIII. Turn- und Sportfest der DDR und XI. Kinder- und Jugendspartakiade

== Notes ==
- Video documentation: "Täve, Trümmer und Triumphe" | 23.09.2014 | 29:55 Min. | Broadcaster: Mitteldeutscher Rundfunk"

== See also ==
- Rungrado 1st of May Stadium
- Strahov Stadium
- Estadio Azteca
- Ranstädter Steinweg
