= Yozhef Sabo =

Ukrainian footballer (born 1940)

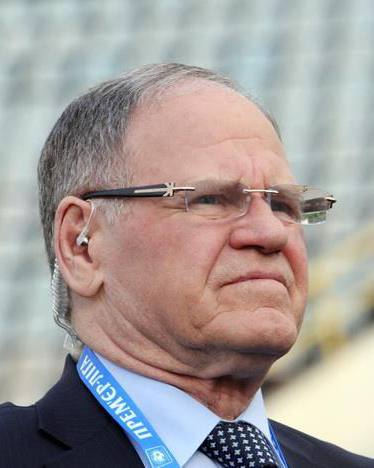

Personal information
- Full name: Yozhef Yozhefovich Sabo
- Date of birth: 29 February 1940 (age 86)
- Place of birth: Ungvár, Kingdom of Hungary
- Height: 1.75 m (5 ft 9 in)
- Position: Midfielder

Youth career
- 1956–1957: Uzhhorod bread factory sports section

Senior career*
Years	Team	Apps	(Gls)
1957	Khimik Kalush		
1957–1959	Spartak Uzhhorod	30	(10)
1959–1969	Dynamo Kyiv	246	(42)
1970	Zorya Luhansk	27	(6)
1971–1972	Dynamo Moscow	44	(3)
Total		347	(61)

International career
1965–1972	USSR	76	(16)

Managerial career
- 1977: Zorya Luhansk
- 1978: CSKA Kyiv
- 1978–1979: Dnipro Dnipropetrovsk
- 1993–1997: Dynamo Kyiv
- 1994: Ukraine
- 1996–1999: Ukraine
- 2004–2005: Dynamo Kyiv
- 2000–2007: Dynamo Kyiv (vice-president)
- * Club domestic league appearances and goals

Yozhef Yozhefovich Sabo (Ukrainian: Йожеф Йожефович Сабо; Hungarian: Szabó József; born 29 February 1940) is a Ukrainian former football player and manager.

== Club career ==
Sabo began to play in 1954 for a team of Uzhhorod bread factory and his first coach was Zoltan Gyorfi (Hungarian: Győrfi Zoltán). Later until August 1957 he played as a forward for Khimik Kalush in competitions among KFK of the Ukrainian SSR. From September 1957 to May 1959 Sabo played in Class B (second tier) for Spartak Uzhhorod.

Sabo made his name as a player at Dynamo Kyiv, appearing at the club from June 1959 to 1969. A four-time Soviet Top League champion, Sabo appeared in 317 games in the competition, scoring 51 goals. His first game he played in a friendly against Tottenham Hotspur on 1 June 1959. In July 1963 Sabo was disqualified for a year for a rough play, but in February 1964 it was changed to a conditional disqualification. Also in 1968 he was disqualified again for refusing to play for the Soviet national team.

Sabo was a member of Dynamo Kyiv when the club in 1961 for the first time gained the Soviet title, breaking the Muscovite spell. He arrived along with two other Uzhhorod players Andriy Havasi and Vasyl Turianchyk.

== International career ==
Aside from being named one of the 33 best players in the USSR for five years, Sabo capped 76 times for the USSR national side, scoring 16 goals. He played in 41 official matches and 35 friendlies. Sabo made his international debut in an away game against Greece on 3 October 1965. While his official first appearance for the Soviet team was in 1965, Sabo was on the 1962 Soviet team roster for the 1962 FIFA World Cup and is now the last surviving member in that roster.

== Coaching career ==
However, Sabo became most famous for his coaching, coaching various sides in the late 70s (such as Zorya Luhansk in 1977 and Dnipro Dnipropetrovsk in 1978–1979), he has coached Dynamo Kyiv numerous times (from 1993 to 1997 and 2004–2005, with breaks in between). He is also arguably the second-most successful coach of the Ukraine national team, compiling 16 wins and 12 draws in 34 matches as coach of the side in 1994 and 1996–1999. On 20 September 2007 he was appointed as Dynamo Kyiv's manager after Anatoliy Demyanenko resigned. However, Sabo resigned in early November that year due to personal health problems. He left Dynamo Kyiv by the end of 2007 and has no longer been involved with the club since that time.

== Personal life ==
Sabo was born on a leap year on 29 February. He is of Hungarian background. He is baptized as a Greek-Catholic.

Sabo has his house near Verecke Pass (Carpathians) where he lives with his wife.

In a 2005 interview, he also said he had always wanted to coach the Hungary national team, but the Hungarian Football Federation leaders never made him a concrete offer.

At night, from 2 to 3 October 2007, Sabo had a heart attack, due to which he was immediately taken to the hospital. Doctors managed to save him, but he was prohibited from working due to a weak heart.

In a 2015 interview, Sabo stated that the away game against Benfica in the 1991–92 European Cup, which Dynamo lost 5–0, was fixed.

He also mentioned that in Moscow he was called a fascist, because they knew that his father served in the Royal Hungarian Army during the World War II, and for which he was later sent to Siberia. His father, József Szabó, returned from imprisonment in 1948, very sick, and passed away in 1951. Eventually, Sabo started to study the Russian language after arriving in Kyiv with the help of a tutor. Sabo was offered to join the Komsomol and Communist Party but declined to explain that he could not be a communist and stay religious. After arriving in Kyiv, he continued to attend an underground Greek-Catholic service that took place in Sviatoshyn.

Sabo said that he became the only Ukrainian who received the medal from the 1966 FIFA World Cup, while at the same time, Valeriy Porkujan, who also played at the World Cup, was left without it. When the Soviets beat Hungary in the quarterfinals, Sabo was forced to hear all kinds of sentiments from his former compatriots. Sabo also explained that the reason why he refused to travel to Hungary with the Soviet Union national team for the quarter-final game was that he tried to finish his journalism degree at Kyiv University. The Soviet team then qualified without Sabo, but he was disqualified.

In 1970, after a short stint in Luhansk, Sabo, for a couple of months, was working as a sports correspondent of the Ukrainian newspaper "Pravda Ukrainy".

In 1960, when Dynamo was playing an away friendly against FC Bayern Munich, Sabo said that he was approached by Bayern's goalie Árpád Fazekas who offered him to remain in Munich.

== International goals ==
No.	Date	Venue	Opponent	Score	Result	Competition
1.	17 October 1965	Copenhagen, Denmark	Denmark	3–0	3–1	1966 FIFA World Cup qualification
2.	16 July 1967	Tbilisi, Soviet Union	Greece	2–0	4–0	UEFA Euro 1968 qualifying
3.	6 September 1967	Turku, Finland	Finland	1–0	5–2	UEFA Euro 1968 qualifying
4.	6 September 1967	Turku, Finland	Finland	4–2	5–2	UEFA Euro 1968 qualifying
5.	8 September 1972	Augsburg, West Germany	Denmark	4–0	4–0	1972 Summer Olympics

== Honours ==
Olympic medal record

Representing the Soviet Union

Men's Football
Bronze medal – third place	1972 Munich	Team competition

=== Player ===
Dynamo Kyiv

- Soviet Top League: 1961, 1966, 1967, 1968
- Soviet Cup: 1964, 1965–66

Dynamo Moscow

- European Cup Winners' Cup runner-up: 1971–72

=== Manager ===
Dynamo Kyiv

- Vyshcha Liha: 1993–94, 1994–95, 1995–96, 1996–97
- Ukrainian Cup: 1995–96, 2004–05

=== Orders ===
- Order of Merit, a full cavalier of the order
  - 3rd degree (15 October 1999)
  - 2nd degree (12 October 2004)
  - 1st degree (1 December 2011)
