= Árpád Fazekas (footballer, born 1930) =

Hungarian footballer (1930–2018)

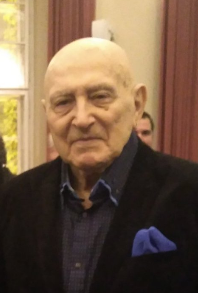
- Fazekas in 2017

Personal information
- Date of birth: 23 June 1930
- Place of birth: Szombathely, Kingdom of Hungary
- Date of death: 10 August 2018 (aged 88)
- Place of death: Budapest, Hungary
- Position: Goalkeeper

Senior career*
Years	Team	Apps	(Gls)
1953–1954	Budapesti Dózsa	25	(0)
1955–1956	Vörös Lobogo	25	(0)
1957–1961	Bayern Munich	100	(0)
1961–1962	Hessen Kassel	18	(0)
1962–1964	Anderlecht	13	(0)
1967–1969	RC Tirlemont		
Total		181	(0)

International career
1955	Hungary	5	(0)
- * Club domestic league appearances and goals

Árpád Fazekas (23 June 1930 – 10 August 2018) was a Hungarian international footballer who played as a goalkeeper.

== Career ==
Born in Szombathely, Fazekas played for Budapesti Dózsa, Vörös Lobogo, Bayern Munich, Hessen Kassel, Anderlecht and RC Tirlemont.

Following the Hungarian Revolution of 1956, he left Hungary and joined Bayern Munich. In 1960 when Dynamo Kyiv was visiting Bayern he told Yozhef Sabo to stay in Munich. He said that he has his own two stories house and a store in Munich.

He earned five international caps for the Hungary national team.

== Later life and death ==
He died in Budapest on 10 August 2018, at the age of 88.
