= Flemming Nielsen =

Danish footballer (1934–2018)

Personal information
- Full name: Flemming Gert Nielsen
- Date of birth: 24 February 1934
- Place of birth: Copenhagen, Denmark
- Date of death: 16 November 2018 (aged 84)
- Position: Midfielder

Senior career*
| Years | Team | Apps | (Gls) |
| 1951–1957 | B 93 | | |
| 1958–1960 | AB | | |
| 1961–1964 | Atalanta | 92 | (8) |
| 1964–1966 | Morton | 29 | (2) |
| 1966–1967 | B 93 | | |

International career
| 1951–1951 | Denmark U-19 | 2 | (0) |
| 1953–1956 | Denmark U-21 | 5 | (3) |
| 1954–1960 | Denmark | 26 | (4) |
- * Club domestic league appearances and goals

Medal record

Men's Football

Representing Denmark

Olympic Games
| Silver medal – second place | 1960 Rome | Team competition |

Flemming Gert Nielsen (24 February 1934 – 16 November 2018), known simply as Flemming Nielsen, was a Danish football player in the midfielder position, who won a silver medal with the Denmark national football team at the 1960 Summer Olympics. He played professionally for Italian club Atalanta BC and Scottish club Morton.

== Biography ==
Born in Copenhagen, Nielsen played as an amateur for local clubs B 93 and AB. He made his debut for the amateur-only Danish national team in June 1954, and played five games and scored two goals at the 1960 Summer Olympics in Rome. He played his last national team game in October 1960, having played a total 26 games and scored four goals for Denmark, before turning professional. He signed a professional contract with Italian club Atalanta BC and played three seasons in Serie A for the club. He played a total 92 games and scored eight goals for Atalanta in the Serie A, and won the 1963 Coppa Italia with the club. He then moved on Greenock Morton in Scotland in 1964. He played 29 games and scored two goals in two seasons with Greenock. In 1966, he moved back to Denmark, where he ended his career for B 93 in 1967.

After ending his active career, Nielsen was a sports journalist for Aftenbladet, Politiken, and B.T., and wrote two books about football.

== Bibliography ==
- 1986: "Fodboldkunstneren Michael Laudrup : rundt om en stjerne", Jori.
- 1998: "Sådan blev Superligaens førertrøje grøn : eventyret om, hvordan AB er vendt tilbage i toppen af dansk fodbold", SAV-Danmark.
