= Ole Fritsen =

Danish footballer and manager (1941–2008)

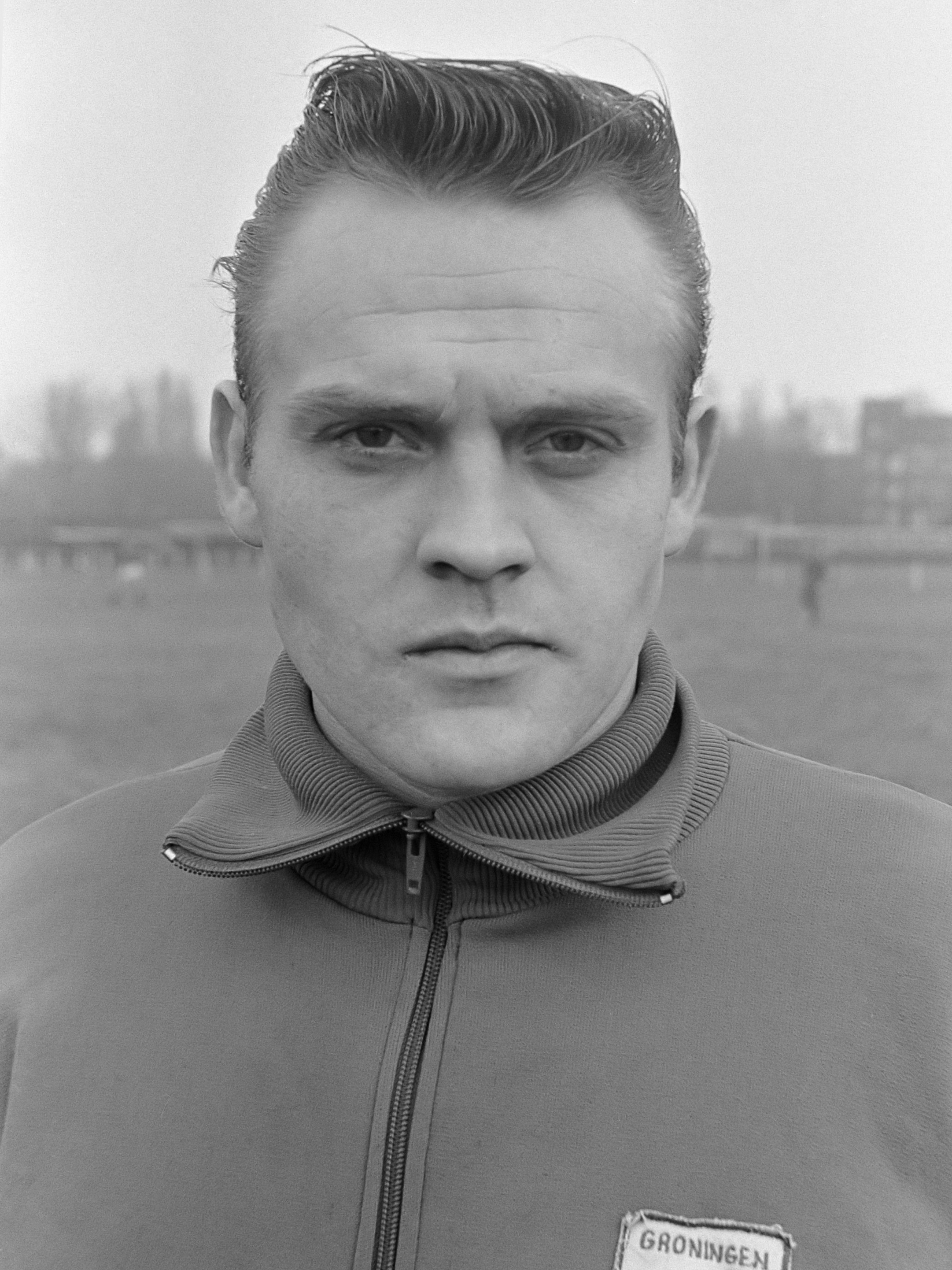
- Fritsen in 1966

Personal information
- Full name: Ole Fritsen
- Date of birth: July 18, 1941
- Place of birth: Vejle, Denmark
- Date of death: May 10, 2008 (aged 66)
- Position: Striker

Youth career
- Brande IF

Senior career*
Years	Team	Apps	(Gls)
1963–1966	Vejle Boldklub	182	(62)
1966–1971	GVAV Groningen	150	(36)
1971–1975	Vejle Boldklub		

International career^{‡}
1964–1973	Denmark	6	(3)

Managerial career
- 1981–1984: Vejle Boldklub
- 1988–1990: Vejle Boldklub
- 1994–1999: Vejle Boldklub
- 2001: Randers Freja
- 2002–2005: FC Fredericia
- * Club domestic league appearances and goals as of 22:16, 13 May 2008 (UTC) ‡ National team caps and goals as of May 23, 2008

Ole Fritsen (18 July 1941 – 10 May 2008) was a Danish footballer and manager.

== Playing career ==
Ole Fritsen began his footballing career in Vejle Boldklub in 1963. Fritsen was the first Vejle Boldklub player to move abroad and become a professional.

In 1966, Fritsen was sold to Dutch club GVAV Groningen, where his professional career lasted until 1 July 1971. In total he played 150 matches for Groningens first team and scored 36 goals.

In 1971, Fritsen went back to Denmark to play for his childhood club Vejle. In his first season after returning, Vejle Boldklub won the Danish Championship, and in 1972 the club won The Double.

== Managerial career ==
Later on Ole Fritsen became a successful manager in Vejle Boldklub. He managed the club for three periods: 1981–1983, 1988–1989 and 1994–1999.

In his first season as manager in Vejle Boldklub, Fritsen won the Danish Cup. After that he built up a team that went on to become Danish Champions in 1984. In addition, Fritsen spend many years coaching the Vejle Boldklubs youth teams. Working with youngsters was arguably his greatest talent.

In his last period as manager Fritsen came from a job as youth coach in the club, where he had helped to educate players such as Thomas Gravesen, Alex Nørlund, Kaspar Dalgas and Peter Graulund. Ole build up a team around these players, and in only four seasons his team advanced to the Danish Superliga, won silver medals in 1997 and participated in the UEFA Cup two times.

In the season 1996–1997, Fritsen was named Manager of the Year in Denmark.

Fritsen's last managerial spell was with FC Fredericia where he spent two seasons from 2003 to 2005.

== Non-playing career ==
Outside the football world Ole Fritsen was a primary school teacher, which would probably explain his flair for working with young players.

== Death ==
Ole Fritsen died in May 2008 of a cardiac arrest at just 66 years old. He was active until the end working as a scout for his old club in Groningen.
