= Egon Hansen (footballer) =

Danish footballer (born 1937)

Personal information
- Date of birth: 19 February 1937 (age 89)

International career
Years	Team	Apps	(Gls)
1965	Denmark	3	(1)

Egon Hansen (born 19 February 1937) is a Danish footballer. He played in three matches for the Denmark national football team in 1965.
