= Leif Sørensen =

Danish footballer (born 1942)

Personal information
- Full name: Leif Dybvad Sørensen
- Date of birth: 25 November 1942 (age 83)
- Place of birth: Frederiksberg, Denmark
- Positions: Forward; midfielder

Senior career*
Years	Team	Apps	(Gls)
1961–1962	Vejle		
1963–1974	Hvidovre IF		

International career
1964–1969	Denmark	15	(3)
- * Club domestic league appearances and goals

Leif Dybvad Sørensen (born 25 November 1942) is a Danish former footballer who played as a forward or midfielder. He made 15 appearances for the Denmark national team from 1964 to 1969.
