= Kresten Bjerre =

Danish footballer (1946-2014)

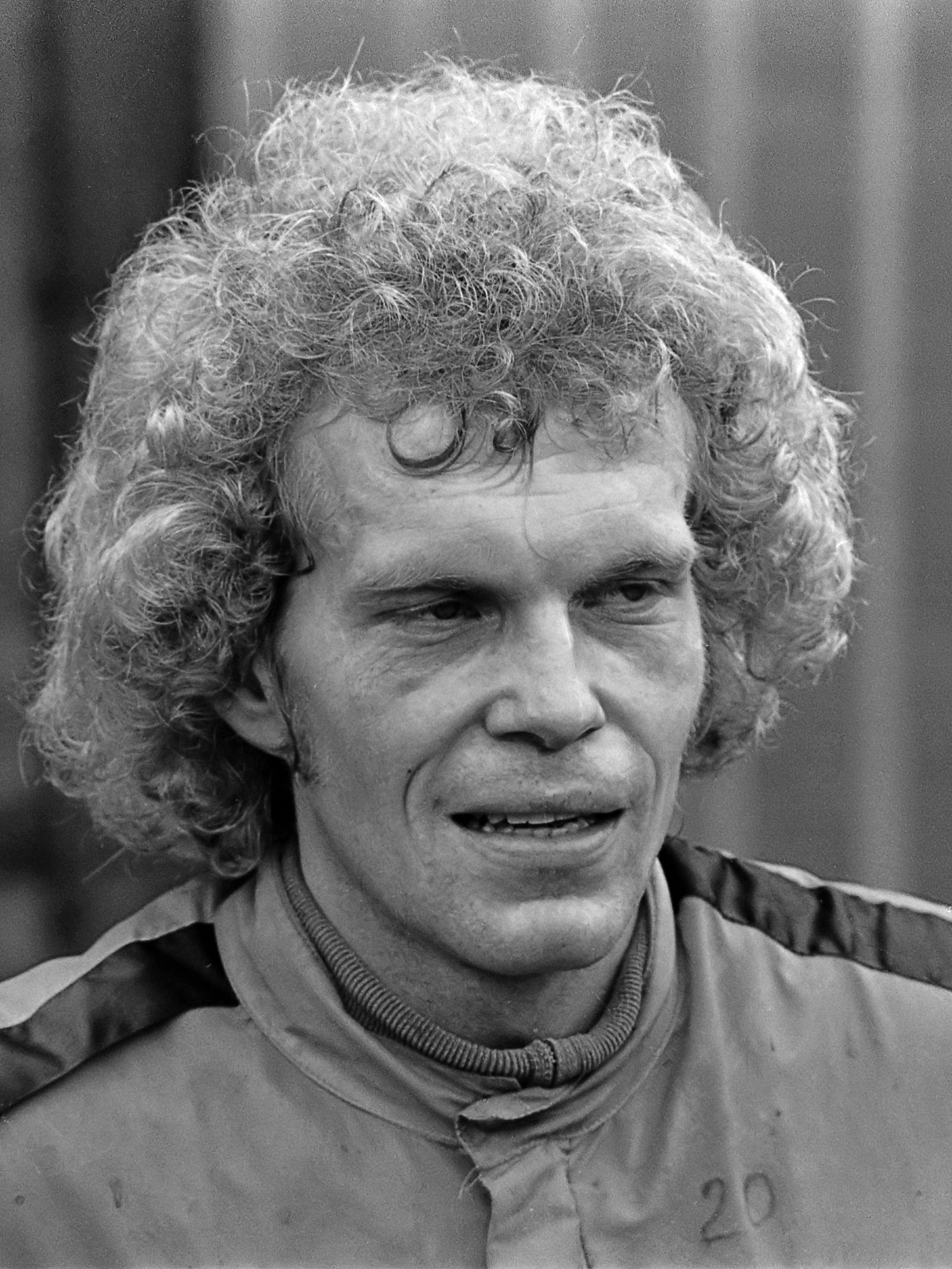
- Kresten Bjerre (1977)

Personal information
- Date of birth: 22 February 1946
- Place of birth: Copenhagen, Denmark
- Date of death: 19 February 2014 (aged 67)
- Place of death: Frederikssund, Denmark
- Position: Defender

Youth career
- 1954–19??: BK Sylvia
- 19??–196?: Akademisk Boldklub

Senior career*
Years	Team	Apps	(Gls)
196?–1967	Akademisk Boldklub		
1968	Houston Stars	31	(7)
1968–1970	PSV	53	(4)
1970–1977	RWDM	248	(1)
1977–1978	Go Ahead Eagles	10	(0)

International career
1965–1966	Denmark U21	3	(0)
1967–1973	Denmark	22	(12)

Managerial career
- 1978–1979: Køge Boldklub
- 1980–1983: Holbæk B&I
- 1983–1987: Herfølge Boldklub
- 1987–19??: Akademisk Boldklub
- * Club domestic league appearances and goals

Kresten Bjerre (22 February 1946 – 19 February 2014) was a Danish footballer, who played professionally for Houston Stars in the United States, and European clubs PSV Eindhoven and R.W.D. Molenbeek.

Nicknamed "Generalen" (the General), the defender obtained a total 22 caps for the Danish national team, for which he scored twelve goals in the late 1960s and early 1970s.

== Playing career ==
=== Club ===
Born in Copenhagen, Bjerre started playing football with local clubs Boldklubben Sylvia and Akademisk Boldklub (AB). He helped AB win the 1967 Danish football championship, and made his national team debut in May 1967. He played eight national team games until October 1967, scoring eight goals. He scored a hat-trick against Iceland, in a most remarkable 14-2 victory. He also scored two goals as Denmark beat the Netherlands 3-2 in the qualification for the 1968 European Championship.

In early 1968, he moved abroad to play professionally for American team Houston Stars in the NASL championship. Due to the Danish rules of amateurism, his national team career went on a hiatus. He played the 1968 season for Houston Stars, When the team folded after the season, Bjerre moved back to Europe. He went on to play for PSV Eindhoven in the Netherlands. In 1969, he moved on to Belgian club R.W.D. Molenbeek. He was one of the best paid footballers in the Belgian League, and was the first foreign player to be named team captain in Belgian football. While at Molenbeek, the Danish rules of amateurism were abolished, and Bjerre re-entered the Danish national team in May 1971. He played 14 additional national team games, scoring a further four goals. In his last 13 Danish national games, Kresten Bjerre served as national team captain.

The lacking professionalism of the Danish national team did not sit well with Bjerre, and he became a Belgian citizen in order for Danish international Benny Nielsen to take his place in Molenbeek's restricted quota of foreign players in 1974. This meant Bjerre's final farewell to the Danish national team in November 1973, though he changed back to Danish citizenship after retiring. Bjerre went on to concentrate on his Molenbeek career, and won the 1975 Belgian League championship with the team. He was a part of the Molenbeek team that reached the semi-finals of the European 1977 UEFA Cup tournament, before retiring at the end of that season.

== Managerial career ==
He moved back to Denmark, where he became a football coach. Under his coaching, Køge BK reached the 1979 Danish Cup final, where the team lost to B 1903. He later coached Holbæk B&I, Herfølge BK, and AB, as well as a number of minor Danish clubs. He went on to become the park manager of BK Frem's stadium Valby Idrætspark. Bjerre died from cancer in early 2014.

== Honours ==
- Belgian League: 1975
- Danish championship: 1967
