= Ole Sørensen (footballer) =

Danish footballer

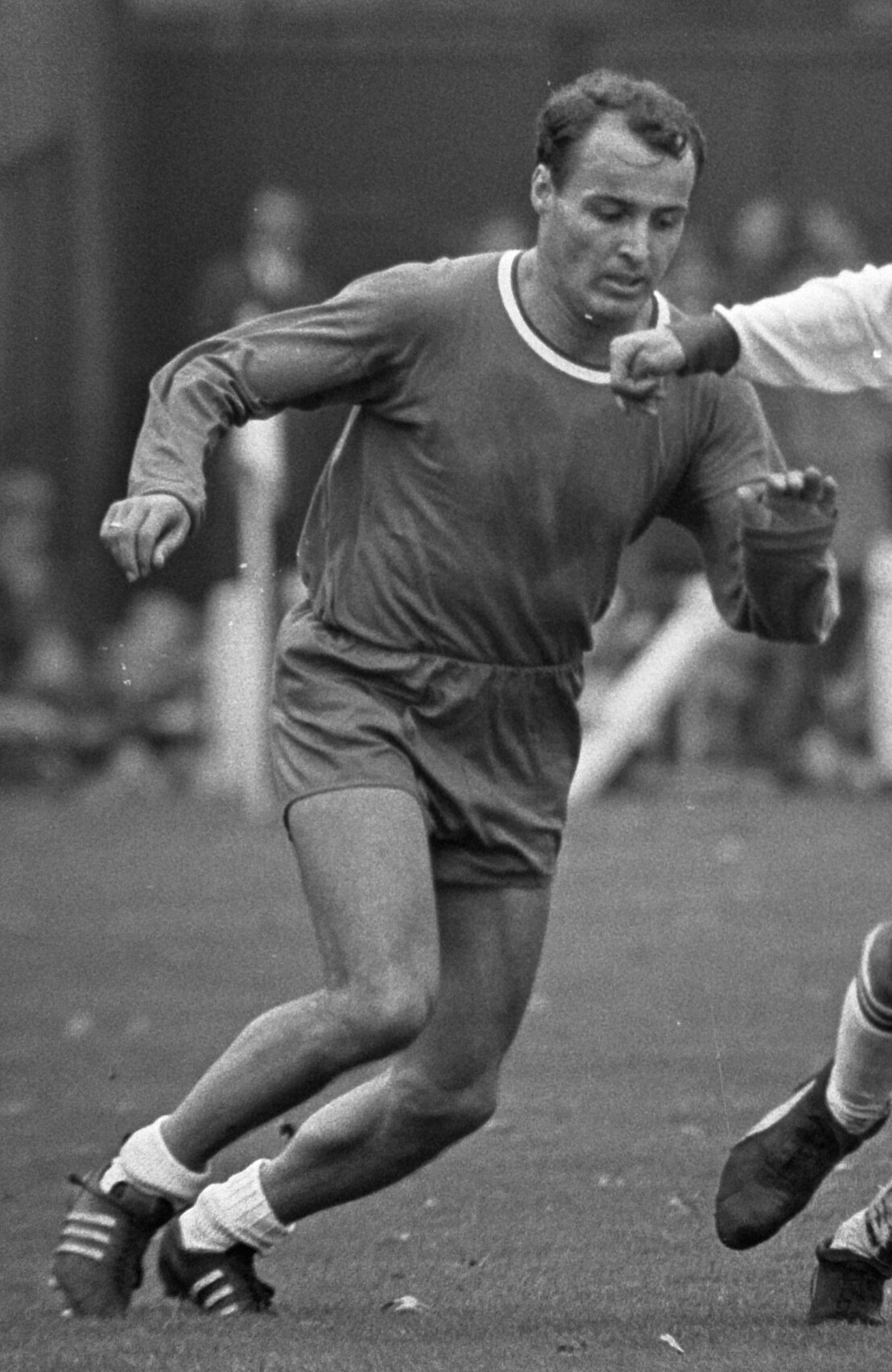
- Sørensen with PSV Eindhoven in 1967

Personal information
- Date of birth: 25 November 1937
- Place of birth: Denmark
- Date of death: 29 January 2015 (aged 77)

Senior career*
Years	Team	Apps	(Gls)
- Kjøbenhavns Boldklub
- FC Köln
- PSV Eindhoven

International career
1961-1969	Denmark	25	(7)
- * Club domestic league appearances and goals

Ole Sørensen (25 November 1937 – 29 January 2015) was a former Danish football player. He played 25 matches, scored 7 goals for the Denmark national team between 1961 and 1969, and represented his country at the 1964 European Championship. On the club level, he played for the Copenhagen club KB in Denmark, FC Köln in Germany, and PSV Eindhoven in the Netherlands.
