= Tom Søndergaard =

Danish footballer (1944–1997)

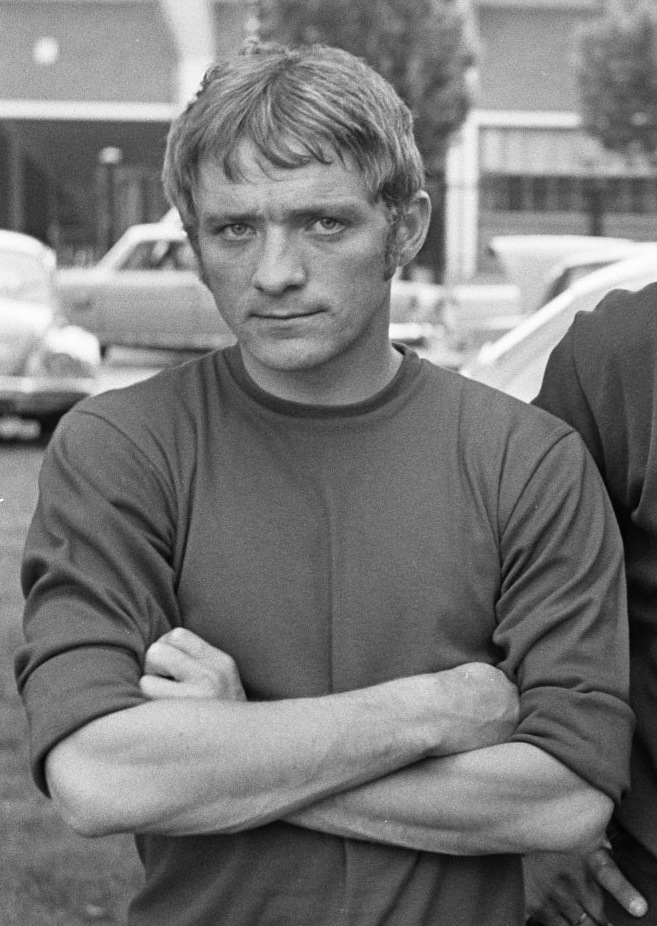
- Tom Søndergaard in 1969

Personal information
- Date of birth: 2 January 1944
- Place of birth: Denmark
- Date of death: 16 June 1997 (aged 53)
- Place of death: Denmark
- Position: Striker

Senior career*
Years	Team	Apps	(Gls)
1962–1968	B93	86	(13)
1968–1969	Rapid Vienna	16	(1)
1969–1970	Ajax	6	(0)
1971–1972	Metz	20	(4)
1972–?	HIK		

International career
1965	Denmark B	1	(0)
1964–1967	Denmark	19	(4)
- * Club domestic league appearances and goals

Tom Søndergaard (2 January 1944 – 16 June 1997) was a Danish footballer.

== Club career ==
During his club career he played for B93, Rapid Vienna, Ajax, Metz and HIK.

== International career ==
He earned 19 caps for the Denmark national football team, and was in the finals squad for the 1964 European Nations' Cup.
