= Tommy Troelsen =

Danish footballer and television presenter (1940–2021)

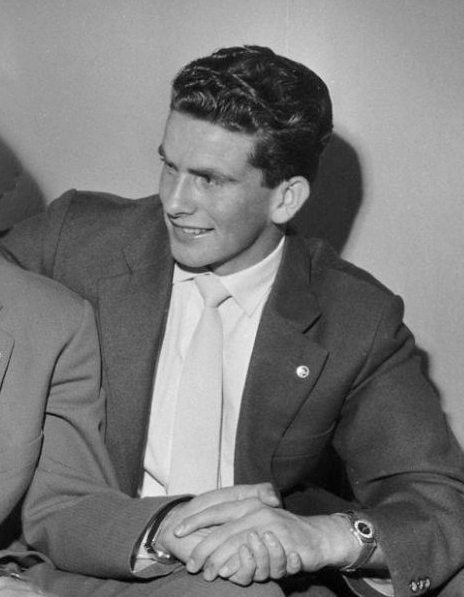
- Troelsen in 1959

Personal information
- Full name: Tommy Brian Troelsen
- Date of birth: 10 July 1940
- Place of birth: Nykøbing Mors, Denmark
- Date of death: 9 March 2021 (aged 80)
- Place of death: Vejle, Denmark
- Height: 1.77 m (5 ft 10 in)
- Position: Striker

Youth career
- Vejle Boldklub

Senior career*
Years	Team	Apps	(Gls)
1957–1968	Vejle Boldklub	191	(84)

International career
1958	Denmark U19	1	(0)
1958–1962	Denmark U21	9	(4)
1959–1968	Denmark	16	(5)

Managerial career
- 1976–1980: Denmark U21
Medal record
Representing Denmark
Olympic Games
Silver medal – second place	1960 Rome	Team competition
- * Club domestic league appearances and goals

Tommy Brian Troelsen (10 July 1940 – 9 March 2021) was a Danish football player and manager, and television presenter. He played his entire club career with Vejle Boldklub, winning one Danish championship and two Danish Cup trophies. Troelsen played 16 matches and scored five goals for the Danish national team, and won a silver medal for Denmark at the 1960 Summer Olympics. After ending his footballing career, he became a popular television host on Danmarks Radio and dk4.

== Football career ==
Troelsen was an active footballer in Vejle Boldklub in the 1960s, making his senior debut in November 1957. He played a total of 257 matches and scored 130 goals, including 191 matches and 84 goals in the Danish championship seasons. He was known for his technical flair, which gave him the nickname Tommy Troldmand (Tommy the Wizard). In 1958, he was a major profile when Vejle Boldklub won The Double of both the Danish championship and the Danish Cup trophy. Troelsen became the youngest player ever to participate in a Danish Cup final, as he was only 17 years old when he and Vejle won 3–2 in the 1958 final against KB. The year after, Troelsen and Vejle celebrated another Danish Cup triumph. In the cup final, Troelsen scored the 1–0 goal in the win against rivals AGF.

He was called up to the Denmark national team in June 1959. Troelsen and Harald Nielsen were the youngest players in the Danish squad at the 1960 Summer Olympics in Rome. Troelsen entered the team in the third match of the group stage, and went on to play the semi-final and final, as Denmark sensationally won the silver medals. In one of his most memorable games, Troelsen scored a hat-trick in the 5–0 win against Norway in June 1968. He ended his national team career in June 1968, having played a total of 16 games and scored five goals for Denmark.

Troelsen was injured very early on in his career and the doctors advised him to undergo surgery as quick as possible. But it took thirteen years before he went to the hospital. Throughout his entire career he played with a knee band. There are no pictures of him without the knee band. But despite this he scored many of his greatest goals from long range. At the age of 28, Troelsen ended his active career due to his injury problems. He played his last game for Vejle in September 1968.

== Television career ==
Besides his footballing career, Troelsen had worked as a teacher in Jelling. After ending his footballing career, Troelsen started a career as a television presenter on Danmarks Radio, presenting football games. He was the host of the legendary "Sportslørdag" program, where he presented and explained English football every Saturday, and helped further the understanding of the game in Denmark. In 1999, he was abruptly fired by Danmarks Radio. In 2001, he was the presenter of Danish 1st Division games on dk4, and also hosted a talkshow on the channel. He retired in August 2004.

== Personal life ==
Troelsen died aged 80 on 9 March 2021 after a long illness.

== Honours ==
- Danish championship: 1958
- Danish Cup: 1958, 1959
