= Finn Wiberg =

Danish football manager and former player (born 1943)

Personal information
- Date of birth: 7 May 1943 (age 83)
- Place of birth: Denmark
- Position: Striker

Senior career*
Years	Team	Apps	(Gls)
1961–1970	AB		
1970–1972	AS Nancy	66	(16)
1972–1974	FC Biel		
1976–1979	Hillerød G&IF		
- Farum IK
1983–198?	Hillerød G&IF		

International career
1966	Denmark U-21	4	(1)
1966–1970	Denmark	14	(5)

Managerial career
- 1976–1979: Hillerød G&IF (player coach)
- 1983–198?: Hillerød G&IF (player coach)
- * Club domestic league appearances and goals

Finn Wiberg (born 7 May 1943) is a Danish former football player and manager.
