= Ole Madsen =

Danish footballer (1934–2006)

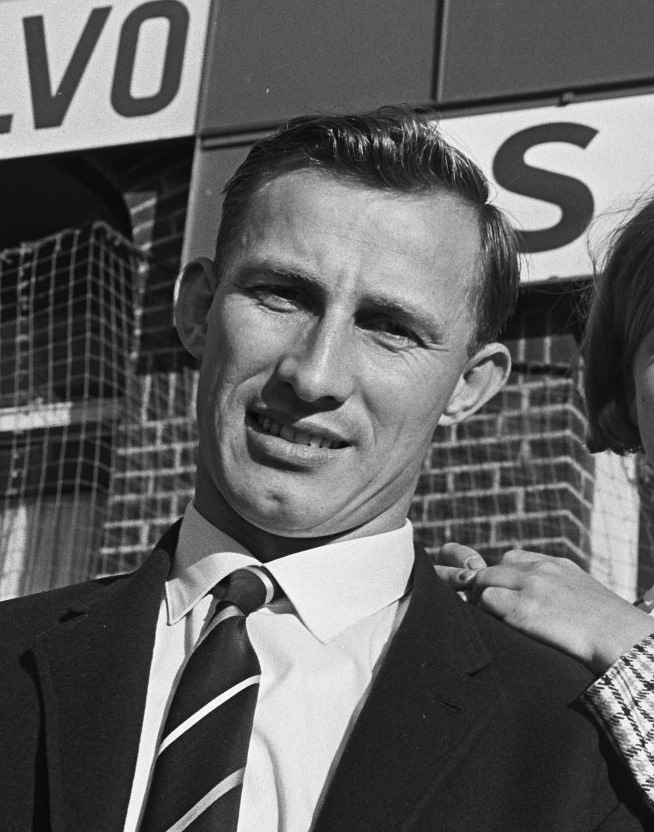
- Madsen with Sparta Rotterdam in 1965

Personal information
- Full name: Ole Eduard Fischer Madsen
- Date of birth: 21 December 1934
- Place of birth: Copenhagen, Denmark
- Date of death: 26 March 2006 (aged 71)
- Height: 1.71 m (5 ft 7 in)
- Position: Striker

Senior career*
Years	Team	Apps	(Gls)
1954–1957	BK Stefan		
1958–1965	Hellerup IK		
1965–1968	Sparta Rotterdam	71	(22)
1968–1969	Hellerup IK		

International career
1958–1969	Denmark	50	(42)
- * Club domestic league appearances and goals

Ole Eduard Fischer Madsen (21 December 1934 – 26 March 2006) was a Danish international footballer, who scored 42 goals in 50 matches for the Denmark national team and competed at the 1964 European Nations' Cup. He is best remembered for scoring on a heel kick against Sweden in 1965. He played 11 seasons for Danish lower-league clubs, before signing a professional contract for Dutch club Sparta Rotterdam, winning the 1966 KNVB Cup with the team.

In 1964, he was named Danish Player of the Year and became the first Dane to receive a vote in the European Footballer of the Year poll. Ole Madsen was regarded as the most popular Danish footballer since Pauli Jørgensen.

== Club career ==
Despite his qualities, Ole Madsen never played in the top-flight Danish championship, but stayed with local lower-league clubs. Madsen made his senior debut with minor league team BK Stefan in 1954. In 1958, he moved to Danish 3rd Division team Hellerup IK (HIK). He helped HIK gain promotion for the Danish 2nd Division for the 1961 season, where the club stayed for three seasons. For the 1964 season, HIK was relegated to the 3rd Division once more.

Despite a low-key club career, Madsen's international performances for the Denmark national team got the attention of European professional clubs. As an amateur player, he was a free agent able to sign with any professional club without the need of a transfer fee. In 1963, a contract with Italian club Atalanta was hindered by a broken nose and subsequent hospitalization. He was offered a contract by Spanish club FC Barcelona in 1964, but he turned it down in order to stay an amateur with the Denmark national team and HIK in the Danish 3rd Division. In 1965, Madsen signed a professional contract with Dutch team Sparta Rotterdam, where he enjoyed success. He stayed three seasons with Sparta, with whom he won the 1966 KNVB Cup. He scored the only goal, as Sparta beat ADO Den Haag 1–0 in the KNVB Cup final. In the Eredivisie championship, he scored a total 22 goals in 71 games for Sparta.

When his contract with Sparta ended in 1968, several big clubs were poised to sign Madsen. However, he decided to return to Denmark in 1968, in order to play for HIK in the 3rd Division. He tried, unsuccessfully, to move HIK towards his own professional goals. He was forced to end his career with HIK in 1969, following an injury sustained while playing an international game for Denmark.

== International career ==
Within his first year at HIK, Madsen made his debut for the Denmark national team in October 1958. He was not selected for the 1960 Summer Olympics, but became a mainstay in the team following that tournament. He was eventually named team captain, and scored six goals in three games against Luxembourg to help Denmark qualify for the 1964 European Nations' Cup. He captained Denmark to a fourth-place finish in the final tournament. Madsen was the first Danish player ever to receive votes in the 1964 European Footballer of the Year poll, getting one point and a shared 19th place. He was subsequently named 1964 Danish Player of the Year.

On 20 June 1965, Madsen scored an extraordinary goal in an international game against the Sweden. The ball fell to him in an inconvenient angle, with himself facing away from goal, but he hit the ball awkwardly with his heel, and it went past Swedish goalkeeper Arne Arvidsson for a 1–0 lead. Denmark eventually won the game 2–1, the first Danish victory against their neighbors in 14 years. He was then seen as the most popular Danish footballer since Pauli Jørgensen. When he signed a professional contract in 1965, he was automatically banned from the amateur-only national team.

Following his return to HIK in 1968, Madsen was once more part of the Danish selection. He was the first player to benefit from new rules by the Danish Football Association allowing ex-professionals to re-enter the national team. He was called up for Denmark in May 1969, and scored two goals in seven games, before injuring his cruciate ligaments in a September 1969 game against the Norway. This was the last international game for Madsen. He ended his career with 42 international goals, the third overall goalscorer for Denmark behind Poul "Tist" Nielsen (52) and Pauli Jørgensen (47). Since then, Jon Dahl Tomasson has also overtaken Madsen.

Scores and results list Denmark's goal tally first, score column indicates score after each Madsen goal.

List of international goals scored by Ole Madsen
No.	Date	Venue	Opponent	Score	Result	Competition	Ref.
1	26 October 1958	Råsunda Stadium, Stockholm, Sweden	Sweden	1-1	4-4	1956–59 Nordic Football Championship	
2	26 October 1958	Råsunda Stadium, Stockholm, Sweden	Sweden	4-4	4-4	1956–59 Nordic Football Championship	
3	26 June 1959	Laugardalsvöllur, Reykjavík, Iceland	Iceland	2-0	4-2	1960 Summer Olympics qualification	
4	26 June 1959	Laugardalsvöllur, Reykjavík, Iceland	Iceland	4-1	4-2	1960 Summer Olympics qualification	
5	2 July 1959	Idrætspark, Copenhagen, Denmark	Norway	2-0	2-1	1960 Summer Olympics qualification	
6	28 May 1961	Idrætspark, Copenhagen, Denmark	East Germany	1-1	1-1	Friendly	
7	18 June 1961	Idrætspark, Copenhagen, Denmark	Sweden	1-2	1-2	1960–63 Nordic Football Championship	
8	17 September 1961	Ullevaal Stadion, Oslo, Norway	Norway	3-0	4-0	1960–63 Nordic Football Championship	
9	15 October 1961	Idrætspark, Copenhagen, Denmark	Finland	4-0	9-1	1960–63 Nordic Football Championship	
10	15 October 1961	Idrætspark, Copenhagen, Denmark	Finland	8-0	9-1	1960–63 Nordic Football Championship	
11	23 May 1962	Zentralstadion, Leipzig, Germany	East Germany	1-1	1-4	Friendly	
12	11 June 1962	Idrætspark, Copenhagen, Denmark	Norway	2-1	6-1	1960–63 Nordic Football Championship	
13	11 June 1962	Idrætspark, Copenhagen, Denmark	Norway	3-1	6-1	1960–63 Nordic Football Championship	
14	11 June 1962	Idrætspark, Copenhagen, Denmark	Norway	6-1	6-1	1960–63 Nordic Football Championship	
15	28 June 1962	Idrætspark, Copenhagen, Denmark	Malta	1-0	6-1	1964 European Nations' Cup qualification	
16	28 June 1962	Idrætspark, Copenhagen, Denmark	Malta	2-0	6-1	1964 European Nations' Cup qualification	
17	28 June 1962	Idrætspark, Copenhagen, Denmark	Malta	4-0	6-1	1964 European Nations' Cup qualification	
18	11 September 1962	Odense Stadion, Odense, Denmark	Netherlands Antilles	3-1	3-1	Friendly	
19	16 September 1962	Olympic Stadium, Helsinki, Finland	Finland	4-1	6-1	1960–63 Nordic Football Championship	
20	16 September 1962	Olympic Stadium, Helsinki, Finland	Finland	6-1	6-1	1960–63 Nordic Football Championship	
21	26 September 1962	Idrætspark, Copenhagen, Denmark	Netherlands	1-0	4-1	Friendly	
22	28 October 1962	Råsunda Stadium, Stockholm, Sweden	Sweden	2-1	2-4	1960–63 Nordic Football Championship	
23	8 December 1962	Empire Stadium, Gżira, Malta	Malta	1-0	3-1	1964 European Nations' Cup qualification	
24	12 December 1962	Mithatpaşa Stadium, Istanbul, Turkey	Turkey	1-1	1-1	Friendly	
25	29 June 1963	Idrætspark, Copenhagen, Denmark	Albania	2-0	4-0	1964 European Nations' Cup qualification	
26	6 November 1963	Idrætspark, Copenhagen, Denmark	Sweden	1-2	2-2	1960–63 Nordic Football Championship	
27	4 December 1963	Stade Municipal, Luxembourg City, Luxembourg	Luxembourg	1-1	3-3	1964 European Nations' Cup qualification	
28	4 December 1963	Stade Municipal, Luxembourg City, Luxembourg	Luxembourg	2-2	3-3	1964 European Nations' Cup qualification	
29	4 December 1963	Stade Municipal, Luxembourg City, Luxembourg	Luxembourg	3-2	3-3	1964 European Nations' Cup qualification	
30	10 December 1963	Idrætspark, Copenhagen, Denmark	Luxembourg	1-1	2-2	1964 European Nations' Cup qualification	
31	10 December 1963	Idrætspark, Copenhagen, Denmark	Luxembourg	2-1	2-2	1964 European Nations' Cup qualification	
32	18 December 1963	Olympic Stadium, Amsterdam, Netherlands	Luxembourg	1-0	1-0	1964 European Nations' Cup qualification	
33	11 October 1964	Idrætspark, Copenhagen, Denmark	Norway	1-0	2-0	1964–67 Nordic Football Championship	
34	11 October 1964	Idrætspark, Copenhagen, Denmark	Norway	2-0	2-0	1964–67 Nordic Football Championship	
35	21 October 1964	Idrætspark, Copenhagen, Denmark	Wales	1-0	1-0	1966 FIFA World Cup qualification	
36	29 November 1964	Spyros Louis Stadium, Athens, Greece	Greece	2-2	2-4	1966 FIFA World Cup qualification	
37	9 June 1965	Idrætspark, Copenhagen, Denmark	Finland	2-1	3-1	1964–67 Nordic Football Championship	
38	9 June 1965	Idrætspark, Copenhagen, Denmark	Finland	3-1	3-1	1964–67 Nordic Football Championship	
39	20 June 1965	Idrætspark, Copenhagen, Denmark	Sweden	1-0	2-1	1964–67 Nordic Football Championship	
40	5 July 1965	Laugardalsvöllur, Reykjavík, Iceland	Iceland	1-0	3-1	Friendly	
41	6 May 1969	Idrætspark, Copenhagen, Denmark	Mexico	2-1	3-1	Friendly	
42	15 June 1969	Idrætspark, Copenhagen, Denmark	Hungary	3-2	3-2	1970 FIFA World Cup qualification	

== Honors ==
- Danish Player of the Year: 1964
- KNVB Cup: 1966
