= Bent Jensen (footballer) =

Danish footballer (born 1947)

Personal information
- Date of birth: 6 June 1947 (age 79)
- Place of birth: Odense, Denmark
- Position: Striker

Senior career*
Years	Team	Apps	(Gls)
–1969	B 1913		
1969–1972	FC Girondins de Bordeaux	87	(29)
1972–1973	Eintracht Braunschweig	18	(2)
1973–1975	Austria Klagenfurt	54	(6)
- B 1913

International career
1966–1968	Denmark U-21	10	(8)
1968–1972	Denmark	20	(13)
- * Club domestic league appearances and goals

Bent Jensen (born 6 June 1947) is a Danish former football player.
