= Niels-Christian Holmstrøm =

Danish footballer (born 1947)

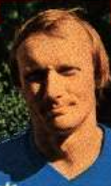
- Holmstrøm with Bordeaux in the 1975–76 season

Personal information
- Full name: Niels-Christian Holmstrøm
- Date of birth: 23 February 1947 (age 79)
- Place of birth: Copenhagen, Denmark

Senior career*
| Years | Team | Apps | (Gls) |
| 1967–1969 | Kjøbenhavns Boldklub | | |
| 1969–1970 | ADO Den Haag | 27 | (7) |
| 1970–1971 | HFC Haarlem | 0 | (0) |
| 1971–1974 | Kjøbenhavns Boldklub | | |
| 1974–1977 | Girondins de Bordeaux | 61 | (17) |

International career
| 1968–1969 | Denmark U-21 | 5 | (2) |
| 1968–1976 | Denmark | 15 | (4) |

Managerial career
- 1978–1979: Kastrup BK
- 1980–1983: Boldklubben 1903
- 1984–1986: Kjøbenhavns Boldklub
- 2001: F.C. Copenhagen
- * Club domestic league appearances and goals

Niels-Christian Holmstrøm (born 23 February 1947) is a Danish former football player, manager, chief consultant in Team Danmark and sports director of Danish football club F.C. Copenhagen. Currently he is the chairman of Kjøbenhavns Boldklub and a "special consultant" for F.C. Copenhagen.

In his active career, Holmstrøm played the position of striker, guiding Kjøbenhavns Boldklub to two Danish Championships. He also played professionally for ADO Den Haag and HFC Haarlem in the Netherlands, and French club Girondins de Bordeaux. He played 15 A nationals and scored four goals for the Danish national team.

== Playing career ==
=== Club ===
Born in Copenhagen, he started his career at Kjøbenhavns Boldklub (KB), where he was the top goal-scorer in the Danish championship in 1968 as he guided the club to its 13th championship trophy. In 1969, he moved abroad to play professionally for Dutch clubs ADO Den Haag and HFC Haarlem. His professional career was quickly over, as he suffered a career-ending injury and was declared medically unfit to play football.

He refused to end his career, and returned to play for KB. In 1974, he repeated his 1968 feat, as he was league top-scorer in KB's 14th Danish championship win. Following that season, he won the 1974 Danish Footballer of the Year award. He moved abroad once more in 1974 to play for FC Girondins de Bordeaux in France, and stayed with the club until his retirement in 1977.

=== International ===
Holmstrøm played six Danish under-21 national team matches and scored two goals, in 1968 and 1969. His last two under-21 national games came after he had already debuted for the Danish senior national team on 4 December 1968 against the Republic of Ireland. He played four national team matches, before his national team career went on a hiatus following his move to the Netherlands, as professional players were not allowed in the national team.

Holmstrøm re-entered the national team in 1973, and he scored 3 goals in a national team match against Indonesia on 3 September 1974 (final score 9–0), and was selected as the Danish team captain in the next 3 national team games. The Danish rule of amateurism had been abolished in 1971, and Holmstrøm continued to play for Denmark after his move to France. His last match for the national team came on 17 November 1976 against Portugal.

== Football executive ==
Following his retirement, he managed Danish club Kastrup BK with such success, that he earned the "Manager of the Year in Denmark" award in 1979. He also managed Boldklubben 1903 (B1903) and KB before he ended his managerial career in 1986. He became sports director of F.C. Copenhagen in 1999, the merger of KB and B1903. He took the temporary role of manager in two games, when manager Kent Karlsson surprisingly left the club in September 2001.

He ended his job at F.C. Copenhagen in 2006, having helped new sports director Carsten V. Jensen ease into the position. He went on to work as a consultant and a board member for FC Copenhagen. He also serves as a member of the board of UEFA's Club Forum, as well as the chairman of KB.

== Personal life ==
Holmstrøm is well known for his outspoken manners, which had given birth to many classic quotes, which is still cited and loved by the fans of FC Copenhagen today. A few examples are "Hvis Per Bjerregaard holder op med at lyve om os, så skal vi nok lade være med at fortælle sandheden om ham!" ("If Per Bjerregaard [Chairman of local rivals Brøndby IF] stops lying about us, we won't tell the truth about him!"), and "Hellere løve for èn dag, end lænkehund hele livet" ("[I'd] rather be a lion for one day, than a chained dog for one entire life"). In 2006 Holmstrøm released his memoirs, "Livet er for kort til lange afleveringer – erindringer med mening" ("Life is too short for long passes – memoirs with a meaning").

== Career statistics ==
=== International goals ===
| # | Date | Venue | Opponent | Score | Result | Competition |
|---|---|---|---|---|---|---|
| 1. | 12 January 1969 | National Stadium, Devonshire, Bermuda | Bermuda | 1–5 | Won | Friendly |
| 2. | 3 September 1974 | Københavns Idrætspark, Copenhagen, Denmark | Indonesia | 9–0 | Won | Friendly |
| 3. | 3 September 1974 | Københavns Idrætspark, Copenhagen, Denmark | Indonesia | 9–0 | Won | Friendly |
| 4. | 3 September 1974 | Københavns Idrætspark, Copenhagen, Denmark | Indonesia | 9–0 | Won | Friendly |
Correct as of 7 October 2015

== Honours ==
- Danish 1st Division : 1968 and 1974, with KB
- Danish 1st Division top scorer : 1968 (23 goals) and 1974 (24 goals).
- Danish Cup : 1969, with KB
- Danish Footballer of the Year : 1974
- Manager of the Year in Denmark : 1979
