= Republic of Ireland national football team results (1960–1979) =

- Win Draw Loss Void

This article contains the results of the Republic of Ireland national football team during the 1960s and 1970s.

== 1960s ==
=== 1960 ===
30 March 1960 Friendly	Republic of Ireland	2–0	Chile	Dublin, Ireland
	Cantwell 16' (pen.); Curtis 80'			Stadium: Dalymount Park; Attendance: 17,000; Referee: Aston (England)

11 May 1960 Friendly	West Germany	0–1	Republic of Ireland	Düsseldorf, West Germany
			Fagan 31'	Stadium: Rheinstadion; Attendance: 51,000; Referee: Ellis (England)

18 May 1960 Friendly	Sweden	4–1	Republic of Ireland	Malmö, Sweden
	Simonsson 25', 30'; Seamus Dunne 43' (o.g.); Börjesson 89'		Fagan 77' (pen.)	Stadium: Malmö Stadium; Attendance: 31,339; Referee: Bronkhorst (Netherlands)

28 September 1960 Friendly	Republic of Ireland	2–3	Wales	Dublin, Ireland
	Fagan 28', 72' (pen.)		Jones 26', 53'; Woosnam 65'	Stadium: Dalymount Park; Attendance: 20,000; Referee: Best (United States)

6 November 1960 Friendly	Republic of Ireland	3–1	Norway	Dublin, Ireland
	Fagan 28'; Fitzgerald 39', 83'		Hennum 2'	Stadium: Dalymount Park; Attendance: 26,000; Referee: Bowman (Scotland)

=== 1961 ===
3 May 1961 1962 FIFA World Cup qualification Group 8	Scotland	4–1	Republic of Ireland	Glasgow, Scotland
	Brand 14', 40'; Herd 55', 85'		Haverty 52'	Stadium: Hampden Park; Attendance: 46,696; Referee: Guigue (France)

7 May 1961 1962 FIFA World Cup qualification Group 8	Republic of Ireland	0–3	Scotland	Dublin, Ireland
			Young 4', 16'; Brand 86'	Stadium: Dalymount Park; Attendance: 36,000; Referee: Grandain (Belgium)

8 October 1961 1962 FIFA World Cup qualification Group 8	Republic of Ireland	1–3	Czechoslovakia	Dublin, Ireland
14:30 UTC+1	Giles 40'		Scherer 3'; Kvašňák 61', 69'	Stadium: Dalymount Park; Attendance: 26,000; Referee: Holland (England)

29 October 1961 1962 FIFA World Cup qualification Group 8	Czechoslovakia	7–1	Republic of Ireland	Prague, Czechoslovakia
14:30 UTC+1	Kvasnak 8', 36'; Scherer 24', 75'; Jelínek 30'; Pospíchal 57'; Masopust 61'		Fogarty 56'	Stadium: Strahov Stadium; Attendance: 30,000; Referee: Lundell (Sweden)

=== 1962 ===
8 April 1962 Friendly	Republic of Ireland	2–3	Austria	Dublin, Ireland
	Cantwell 48'; Tuohy 59'		Buzek 43'; Hirnschrodt 58'; Hof 64'	Stadium: Dalymount Park; Attendance: 32,434; Referee: Gulde (Switzerland)

12 August 1962 1964 European Nations' Cup qualifying	Republic of Ireland	4–2	Iceland	Dublin, Ireland
	Tuohy 11'; Fogarty 41'; Cantwell 65', 76'		Jónsson 37', 86'	Stadium: Dalymount Park; Attendance: 20,246; Referee: Smith (Wales)

2 September 1962 1964 European Nations' Cup qualifying	Iceland	1–1 (3–5 agg.)	Republic of Ireland	Reykjavík, Iceland
	Árnason 59'		Tuohy 38'	Stadium: Laugardalsvöllur; Attendance: 9,100; Referee: Nielsen (Norway)

=== 1963 ===
9 June 1963 Friendly	Republic of Ireland	1–0	Scotland	Dublin, Ireland
	Cantwell 6'			Stadium: Dalymount Park; Attendance: 30,000; Referee: Howley (England)

25 September 1963 1964 European Nations' Cup qualifying	Austria	0–0	Republic of Ireland	Vienna, Austria
				Stadium: Praterstadion; Attendance: 26,741; Referee: Gere (Hungary)

13 October 1963 1964 European Nations' Cup qualifying	Republic of Ireland	3–2 (3–2 agg.)	Austria	Dublin, Ireland
	Cantwell 44', 89' (pen.); Koller 64' (o.g.)		Koleznik 38'; Flögel 82'	Stadium: Dalymount Park; Attendance: 39,963; Referee: Poulsen (Denmark)

=== 1964 ===
11 March 1964 1964 European Nations' Cup qualifying	Spain	5–1	Republic of Ireland	Sevilla, Spain
	Amancio 5', 29'; Marcelino 34', 62'; Fusté 14'		McEvoy 19'	Stadium: Sánchez Pizjuan; Attendance: 27,200; Referee: Van Nuffel (Belgium)

8 April 1964 1964 European Nations' Cup qualifying	Republic of Ireland	0–2 (1–7 agg.)	Spain	Dublin, Ireland
			Zaballa 24', 86'	Stadium: Dalymount Park; Attendance: 38,027; Referee: Versyp (Belgium)

10 May 1964 Friendly	Poland	3–1	Republic of Ireland	Kraków, Poland
	Faber 25'; Wilim 64'; Szołtysik 76'		Ambrose 35'	Stadium: Stadion Wisły; Attendance: 35,000; Referee: Kainer (Austria)

13 May 1964 Friendly	Norway	1–4	Republic of Ireland	Oslo, Norway
	Eriksen 53'		Hurley 3', 63'; Giles 10'; McEvoy 77'	Stadium: Ullevaal; Attendance: 14,354; Referee: Malka (West Germany)

24 May 1964 Friendly	Republic of Ireland	1–3	England	Dublin, Ireland
	Strahan 41'		Eastham 9'; Byrne 22'; Greaves 55'	Stadium: Dalymount Park; Attendance: 45,000; Referee: Davidson (Scotland)

25 October 1964 Friendly	Republic of Ireland	3–2	Poland	Dublin, Ireland
	McEvoy 25', 82'; Mooney 84'		Lubański 19'; Pol 21'	Stadium: Dalymount Park; Attendance: 42,000; Referee: Clements (England)

=== 1965 ===
24 March 1965 Friendly	Republic of Ireland	0–2	Belgium	Dublin, Ireland
			McEvoy 5' (o.g.); Jurion 59'	Stadium: Dalymount Park; Attendance: 30,000; Referee: Boogaerts (Netherlands)

5 May 1965 1966 FIFA World Cup qualification Group 9	Republic of Ireland	1–0	Spain	Dublin, Ireland
	Iribar 61' (o.g.)			Stadium: Dalymount Park; Attendance: 40,772; Referee: Callaghan (Wales)

27 October 1965 1966 FIFA World Cup qualification Group 9	Spain	4–1	Republic of Ireland	Sevilla, Spain
	Pereda 40', 43', 58'; Lapetra 63'		McEvoy 26'	Stadium: Sánchez Pizjuan; Attendance: 29,452; Referee: de Freitas (Portugal)

10 November 1965 1966 FIFA World Cup qualification Group 9	Spain	1–0	Republic of Ireland	Paris, France
	Ufarte 80'	Report		Stadium: Stade Colombes; Attendance: 35,731; Referee: Schwinte (France)

=== 1966 ===
4 May 1966 Friendly	Republic of Ireland	0–4	West Germany	Dublin, Ireland
			Haller 5'; Beckenbauer 18'; Overath 57', 74'	Stadium: Dalymount Park; Attendance: 20,000; Referee: Mullan (Scotland)

22 May 1966 Friendly	Austria	1–0	Republic of Ireland	Vienna, Austria
	Seitl 76'			Stadium: Praterstadion; Attendance: 33,000; Referee: Gere (Hungary)

25 May 1966 Friendly	Belgium	2–3	Republic of Ireland	Liège, Belgium
	Van Himst 5'; Vandeboer 25'		Cantwell 20', 46'; Fullam 69'	Stadium: Stade Maurice Dufrasne; Attendance: 2,445; Referee: Schwinte (France)

23 October 1966 UEFA Euro 1968 qualifying Group 1	Republic of Ireland	0–0	Spain	Dublin, Ireland
				Stadium: Dalymount Park; Attendance: 37,000; Referee: Carlsson (Sweden)

26 November 1966 UEFA Euro 1968 qualifying Group 1	Republic of Ireland	2–1	Turkey	Dublin, Ireland
	Frank O'Neill 60'; McEvoy 74'		Altıparmak 88'	Stadium: Dalymount Park; Attendance: 23,300; Referee: Sørensen (Denmark)

7 December 1966 UEFA Euro 1968 qualifying Group 1	Spain	2–0	Republic of Ireland	Valencia, Spain
	José María 21'; Pirri 35'			Stadium: Mestalla Stadium; Attendance: 9,810; Referee: Roomer (Netherlands)

=== 1967 ===
22 February 1967 UEFA Euro 1968 qualifying Group 1	Turkey	2–1	Republic of Ireland	Ankara, Turkey
	Elmastaşoğlu 35'; Altıparmak 78'		Cantwell 90'	Stadium: 19 Mayıs Stadı; Attendance: 31,100; Referee: Rumenchev (Bulgaria)

21 May 1967 UEFA Euro 1968 qualifying Group 1	Republic of Ireland	0–2	Czechoslovakia	Dublin, Ireland
			Szikora 16'; Masný 47'	Stadium: Dalymount Park; Attendance: 12,000; Referee: Schaut (Belgium)

22 November 1967 UEFA Euro 1968 qualifying Group 1	Czechoslovakia	1–2	Republic of Ireland	Prague, Czechoslovakia
	Dempsey 57' (o.g.)		Treacy 65'; Turlough O'Connor 86'	Stadium: Stadion Eden; Attendance: 11,000; Referee: Vetter (East Germany)

=== 1968 ===
15 May 1968 Friendly	Republic of Ireland	2–2	Poland	Dublin, Ireland
	Dempsey 51'; Hale 86'		Lubański 5' (pen.); Jarosik 24'	Stadium: Dalymount Park; Attendance: 28,000; Referee: Jennings (England)

30 October 1968 Friendly	Poland	1–0	Republic of Ireland	Chorzów, Poland
	Lubański 61'			Stadium: Stadion Śląski; Attendance: 18,000; Referee: Nilsson (Sweden)

10 November 1968 Friendly	Republic of Ireland	2–2	Austria	Dublin, Ireland
	Rogers 82'; Hale 87'		Redl 15'; Hof 50'	Stadium: Dalymount Park; Attendance: 20,000; Referee: Davidson (Scotland)

4 December 1968 1970 FIFA World Cup qualification Group 2	Republic of Ireland	(1–1)	Denmark	Dublin, Ireland
	Giles 40' (pen.)	Match Abandoned 51' (Note: Match abandoned after 51 minutes due to fog. The match was replayed on 15 October 1969.)	Wiberg 21'	Stadium: Dalymount Park; Attendance: 23,555; Referee: Syme (Scotland)

=== 1969 ===
4 May 1969 1970 FIFA World Cup qualification Group 2	Republic of Ireland	1–2	Czechoslovakia	Dublin, Ireland
14:30 UTC+1	Rogers 15'		Kabát 51'; Adamec 70'	Stadium: Dalymount Park; Attendance: 32,002; Referee: Ribeiro (Portugal)

27 May 1969 1970 FIFA World Cup qualification Group 2	Denmark	2–0	Republic of Ireland	Copenhagen, Denmark
	Sørensen 34', 66'			Stadium: Idrætsparken; Attendance: 26,195; Referee: Arkhipov (Soviet Union)

8 June 1969 1970 FIFA World Cup qualification Group 2	Republic of Ireland	1–2	Hungary	Dublin, Ireland
	Givens 60'		Dunai II 24'; Bene 80'	Stadium: Dalymount Park; Attendance: 17,286; Referee: Loraux (Belgium)

21 September 1969 Friendly	Republic of Ireland	1–1	Scotland	Dublin, Ireland
	Givens 11'		Stein 8'	Stadium: Dalymount Park; Attendance: 27,000; Referee: Burtenshaw (England)

7 October 1969 1970 FIFA World Cup qualification Group 2	Czechoslovakia	3–0	Republic of Ireland	Prague, Czechoslovakia
18:00 UTC+1	Adamec 8', 36', 45'			Stadium: Stadion Letná; Attendance: 32,879; Referee: Lo Bello (Italy)

15 October 1969 1970 FIFA World Cup qualification Group 2	Republic of Ireland	1–1	Denmark	Dublin, Ireland
	Givens 10'		Bent Jensen 84' (pen.)	Stadium: Dalymount Park; Attendance: 19,603; Referee: Patterson (Scotland)

5 November 1969 1970 FIFA World Cup qualification Group 2	Hungary	4–0	Republic of Ireland	Budapest, Hungary
	Halmosi 30'; Bene 49'; Puskás 68'; Kocsis 83'			Stadium: Népstadion; Attendance: 23,602; Referee: Jakše (Yugoslavia)

== 1970s ==
=== 1970 ===
6 May 1970 Friendly	Poland	2–1	Republic of Ireland	Poznań, Poland
	Kozerski 9'; Szołtysik 25'		Givens 84'	Stadium: Warta Stadium; Attendance: 52,000; Referee: Tolchinski (Soviet Union)

9 May 1970 Friendly	West Germany	2–1	Republic of Ireland	West Berlin, West Germany
	Seeler 17'; Löhr 82'		Mulligan 86'	Stadium: Olympiastadion; Attendance: 60,000; Referee: Boström (Sweden)

23 September 1970 Friendly	Republic of Ireland	0–2	Poland	Dublin, Ireland
			Stachurski 26'; Szołtysik 36'	Stadium: Dalymount Park; Attendance: 20,000; Referee: Lyden (England)

14 October 1970 UEFA Euro 1972 qualifying Group 6	Republic of Ireland	1–1	Sweden	Dublin, Ireland
	Carroll 43' (pen.)		Brzokoupil 61'	Stadium: Dalymount Park; Attendance: 28,194; Referee: Helies (France)

28 October 1970 UEFA Euro 1972 qualifying Group 6	Sweden	1–0	Republic of Ireland	Solna, Sweden
	Turesson 74'			Stadium: Råsunda; Attendance: 11,922; Referee: Kazakov (Soviet Union)

8 December 1970 UEFA Euro 1972 qualifying Group 6	Italy	3–0	Republic of Ireland	Florence, Italy
	De Sisti 22' (pen.); Boninsegna 42'; Prati 84'			Stadium: Stadio Artemio Franchi; Attendance: 41,092; Referee: Schaut (Belgium)

=== 1971 ===
10 May 1971 UEFA Euro 1972 qualifying Group 6	Republic of Ireland	1–2	Italy	Dublin, Ireland
	Conway 23'		Boninsegna 15'; Prati 59'	Stadium: Lansdowne Road; Attendance: 22,613; Referee: Schulenburg (West Germany)

30 May 1971 UEFA Euro 1972 qualifying Group 6	Republic of Ireland	1–4	Austria	Dublin, Ireland
	Rogers 50' (pen.)		Schmidradner 4' (pen.); Kodat 11'; Jimmy Dunne 30' (o.g.); Starek 72'	Stadium: Dalymount Park; Attendance: 14,674; Referee: Öberg (Norway)

10 October 1971 UEFA Euro 1972 qualifying Group 6	Austria	6–0	Republic of Ireland	Linz, Austria
	Jara 12', 85'; Pirkner 40' (pen.); Parits 45', 52', 90'			Stadium: Linzer Stadion; Attendance: 15,050; Referee: Göppel (Switzerland)

=== 1972 ===
4 January 1972 Unofficial friendly	Republic of Ireland	3–0	West German Olympic XI	Ireland
	Mick Martin; Herrick; Fairclough

11 June 1972 Brazil Independence Cup	Iran	1–2	Republic of Ireland	Recife, Brazil
	Ghelichkhani 13'		Leech 63'; Givens 67'	Stadium: Santa Crux Stadium; Attendance: 10,500; Referee: Angonese (Italy)

18 June 1972 Brazil Independence Cup	Ecuador	2–3	Republic of Ireland	Natal, Brazil
	Coronel 37'; Lasso 78'		Rogers 12'; Martin 61'; Turlough O'Connor 86'	Stadium: New Lake Stadium; Referee: Kitabjian (France)

21 June 1972 Brazil Independence Cup	Chile	2–1	Republic of Ireland	Recife, Brazil
	Caszely 60'; Fouilloux 68'		Rogers 79'	Stadium: Isle of Retiro Stadium; Referee: Arppi Filho (Brazil)

25 June 1972 Brazil Independence Cup	Portugal	2–1	Republic of Ireland	Recife, Brazil
	Peres 25'; Nené 37'		Leech 38'	Stadium: Isle of Retiro Stadium; Attendance: 13,000; Referee: Coerezza (Argentina)

18 October 1972 1974 FIFA World Cup qualification Group 9	Republic of Ireland	1–2	Soviet Union	Dublin, Ireland
	Conroy 83'		Fedotov 55'; Kolotov 65'	Stadium: Lansdowne Road; Attendance: 27,656; Referee: Öberg (Norway)

15 November 1972 1974 FIFA World Cup qualification Group 9	Republic of Ireland	2–1	France	Dublin, Ireland
	Conroy 27'; Treacy 76'		Larqué 66'	Stadium: Dalymount Park; Attendance: 26,511; Referee: Rasmussen (Denmark)

=== 1973 ===
13 May 1973 1974 FIFA World Cup qualification Group 9	Soviet Union	1–0	Republic of Ireland	Moscow, Soviet Union
	Onishchenko 58'			Stadium: Lenin Stadium; Attendance: 65,527; Referee: Dahlberg (Sweden)

16 May 1973 Friendly	Poland	2–0	Republic of Ireland	Wrocław, Poland
	Lubański 44', 83'			Stadium: Olympic Stadium; Attendance: 35,000; Referee: Kunze (East Germany)

19 May 1973 1974 FIFA World Cup qualification Group 9	France	1–1	Republic of Ireland	Paris, France
	Chiesa 78'		Martin 83'	Stadium: Parc des Princes; Attendance: 28,405; Referee: Rainea (Romania)

6 June 1973 Friendly	Norway	1–1	Republic of Ireland	Oslo, Norway
	Paulsen 69'		Dennehy 69'	Stadium: Ullevaal; Attendance: 12,000; Referee: Kunze (East Germany)

21 October 1973 Friendly	Republic of Ireland	1–0	Poland	Dublin, Ireland
	Dennehy 32'			Stadium: Dalymount Park; Attendance: 25,000; Referee: Matthewson (England)

=== 1974 ===
5 May 1974 Friendly	Brazil	2–1	Republic of Ireland	Rio de Janeiro, Brazil
	Leivinha 50'; Rivellino 56'		Mancini 70'	Stadium: Maracanã Stadium; Attendance: 74,696; Referee: Velasquez (Colombia)

8 May 1974 Friendly	Uruguay	2–0	Republic of Ireland	Montevideo, Uruguay
	Morena 16', 26'			Stadium: Centenario Stadium; Attendance: 40,000; Referee: Barreto (Uruguay)

12 May 1974 Friendly	Chile	1–2	Republic of Ireland	Santiago, Chile
	Valdés 57'		Hand 43'; Conway 76'	Stadium: Estadio Nacional; Attendance: 16,000; Referee: Lira (Chile)

30 October 1974 UEFA Euro 1976 qualifying Group 6	Republic of Ireland	3–0	Soviet Union	Dublin, Ireland
	Givens 22', 30', 70'	Report		Stadium: Dalymount Park; Attendance: 31,750; Referee: Axelryd (Sweden)

20 November 1974 UEFA Euro 1976 qualifying Group 6	Turkey	1–1	Republic of Ireland	İzmir, Turkey
	Martin 54' (o.g.)		Givens 61'	Stadium: İzmir Atatürk Stadium; Attendance: 67,000; Referee: Srodecki (Poland)

=== 1975 ===
1 March 1975 Friendly	Republic of Ireland	1–0	West Germany B	Dublin, Ireland
	Conway 89'			Stadium: Dalymount Park; Attendance: 18,000; Referee: Homewood (England)

11 May 1975 UEFA Euro 1976 qualifying Group 6	Republic of Ireland	2–1	Switzerland	Dublin, Ireland
	Martin 2'; Treacy 28'		Müller 74'	Stadium: Dalymount Park; Attendance: 49,074; Referee: Schiller (Austria)

18 May 1975 UEFA Euro 1976 qualifying Group 6	Soviet Union	2–1	Republic of Ireland	Kiev, Soviet Union
	Blokhin 13'; Kolotov 29'		Hand 79'	Stadium: Central Stadium; Attendance: 84,480; Referee: Vigliani (France)

21 May 1975 UEFA Euro 1976 qualifying Group 6	Switzerland	1–0	Republic of Ireland	Bern, Switzerland
	Elsener 75'			Stadium: Wankdorf Stadion; Attendance: 12,793; Referee: Correia (Portugal)

29 October 1975 UEFA Euro 1976 qualifying Group 6	Republic of Ireland	4–0	Turkey	Dublin, Ireland
	Givens 25', 28', 34', 88'			Stadium: Dalymount Park; Attendance: 25,000; Referee: Martínez (Spain)

=== 1976 ===
24 March 1976 Friendly	Republic of Ireland	3–0	Norway	Dublin, Ireland
	Brady 25'; Holmes 36' (pen.); Walsh 61'			Stadium: Dalymount Park; Attendance: 22,000; Referee: Partridge (England)

26 May 1976 Friendly	Poland	0–2	Republic of Ireland	Poznań, Poland
			Givens 5', 11'	Stadium: Warta Stadium; Attendance: 15,000; Referee: Pouček (Czechoslovakia)

8 October 1976 Friendly	England	1–1	Republic of Ireland	London, England
	Pearson 44'		Daly 55' (pen.)	Stadium: Wembley Stadium; Attendance: 52,000; Referee: Alexander (Scotland)

13 October 1976 Friendly	Turkey	3–3	Republic of Ireland	Ankara, Turkey
	Turan 51', 70'; Ertürk 64'		Stapleton 3'; Daly 14'; Waters 80'	Stadium: 19 Mayıs Stadı; Attendance: 40,000; Referee: Galić (Yugoslavia)

17 November 1976 1978 FIFA World Cup qualification Group 5	France	2–0	Republic of Ireland	Paris, France
	Platini 47' (pen.); Bathenay 88'			Stadium: Parc des Princes; Attendance: 43,437; Referee: Maksimović (Yugoslavia)

=== 1977 ===
9 February 1977 Friendly	Republic of Ireland	0–1	Spain	Dublin, Ireland
			Satrústegui 10'	Stadium: Lansdowne Road; Attendance: 22,000; Referee: Hunting (England)

30 March 1977 1978 FIFA World Cup qualification Group 5	Republic of Ireland	1–0	France	Dublin, Ireland
	Brady 11'			Stadium: Lansdowne Road; Attendance: 48,000; Referee: Linemayr (Austria)

24 April 1977 Friendly	Republic of Ireland	0–0	Poland	Dublin, Ireland
				Stadium: Dalymount Park; Attendance: 20,000; Referee: Matthewson (England)

1 June 1977 1978 FIFA World Cup qualification Group 5	Bulgaria	2–1	Republic of Ireland	Sofia, Bulgaria
	Panov 14'; Jeliazkov 76'		Givens 66'	Stadium: Vasil Levski National Stadium; Attendance: 35,214; Referee: Zlatanos (Greece)

12 October 1977 1978 FIFA World Cup qualification Group 5	Republic of Ireland	0–0	Bulgaria	Dublin, Ireland
				Stadium: Lansdowne Road; Attendance: 25,000; Referee: Gonella (Italy)

=== 1978 ===
5 April 1978 Friendly	Republic of Ireland	4–2	Turkey	Dublin, Ireland
	Giles 3'; McGee 12'; Treacy 18', 23'		Mustafaoğlu 5'; Turan 62'	Stadium: Lansdowne Road; Attendance: 12,000; Referee: Alexander (Scotland)

12 April 1978 Friendly	Poland	3–0	Republic of Ireland	Łódź, Poland
	Boniek 52'; Deyna 60'; Mazur 82'			Stadium: Stadion ŁKS; Attendance: 30,000; Referee: Scheurell (East Germany)

21 May 1978 Friendly	Norway	0–0	Republic of Ireland	Oslo, Norway
				Stadium: Ullevaal; Attendance: 11,500; Referee: Fredriksson (Sweden)

24 May 1978 UEFA Euro 1980 qualifying Group 1	Denmark	3–3	Republic of Ireland	Copenhagen, Denmark
	Henning Jensen 31'; Nielsen 78' (pen.); Lerby 79'		Stapleton 11'; Grealish 25'; Daly 65'	Stadium: Idrætsparken; Attendance: 28,900; Referee: Beck (Netherlands)

20 September 1978 UEFA Euro 1980 qualifying Group 1	Republic of Ireland	0–0	Northern Ireland	Dublin, Ireland
				Stadium: Lansdowne Road; Attendance: 46,000; Referee: Rion (Belgium)

25 October 1978 UEFA Euro 1980 qualifying Group 1	Republic of Ireland	1–1	England	Dublin, Ireland
	Daly 27'		Latchford 8'	Stadium: Lansdowne Road; Attendance: 48,613; Referee: Aldinger (West Germany)

=== 1979 ===
2 May 1979 UEFA Euro 1980 qualifying Group 1	Republic of Ireland	2–0	Denmark	Dublin, Ireland
	Daly 45'; Givens 66'			Stadium: Lansdowne Road; Attendance: 35,000; Referee: Vautrot (France)

19 May 1979 UEFA Euro 1980 qualifying Group 1	Bulgaria	1–0	Republic of Ireland	Sofia, Bulgaria
	Tsvetkov 81'			Stadium: Vasil Levski National Stadium; Attendance: 25,000; Referee: Bucek (Austria)

22 May 1979 Friendly	Republic of Ireland	1–3	West Germany	Dublin, Ireland
	Ryan 26'		Rummenigge 29'; Kelsch 81'; Hoeneß 90'	Stadium: Lansdowne Road; Attendance: 25,000; Referee: Courtney (England)

29 May 1979 Unofficial friendly	Republic of Ireland	0–0	Argentina	Dublin, Ireland
		Report		Stadium: Lansdowne Road; Attendance: 25,000; Referee: Valentine (Scotland)

11 September 1979 Friendly	Wales	2–1	Republic of Ireland	Swansea, Wales
	Walsh 24'; Curtis 53'		Jones 22' (o.g.)	Stadium: Vetch Field; Attendance: 6,825; Referee: Stevens (England)

26 September 1979 Friendly	Czechoslovakia	4–1	Republic of Ireland	Prague, Czechoslovakia
18:00 UTC+2	Ondruš 5'; Nehoda 35'; Kroupa 72'; Masný 90'		McGee 89'	Stadium: Stadion Evžena Rošického; Attendance: 10,000; Referee: Milchenko (Soviet Union)

17 October 1979 UEFA Euro 1980 qualifying Group 1	Republic of Ireland	3–0	Bulgaria	Dublin, Ireland
	Martin 39'; Grealish 46'; Stapleton 83'			Stadium: Lansdowne Road; Attendance: 22,000; Referee: Einbeck (East Germany)

29 October 1979 Friendly	Republic of Ireland	3–2	United States	Dublin, Ireland
	Grealish 64'; Givens 66'; Anderson 68'		di Bernardo 11'; Villa 63'	Stadium: Dalymount Park; Attendance: 17,000; Referee: Farrell (Ireland)

21 November 1979 UEFA Euro 1980 qualifying Group 1	Northern Ireland	1–0	Republic of Ireland	Belfast, Northern Ireland
	Armstrong 54'			Stadium: Windsor Park; Attendance: 15,000; Referee: Daina (Switzerland)

== See also ==
- Republic of Ireland national football team results (1954–1959)
- Republic of Ireland national football team - 1980s Results
