= Brazil Independence Cup =

1972 Brazil Independence Cup
Taça Independência

Tournament details
- Host country: Brazil
- Dates: 11 June – 9 July
- Teams: 20 (from 5 confederations)
- Venue: 15 (in 12 host cities)

Final positions
- Champions: Brazil
- Runners-up: Portugal
- Third place: Yugoslavia
- Fourth place: Argentina

Tournament statistics
- Matches played: 44
- Goals scored: 136 (3.09 per match)
- Top scorer: (Socialist Federal Republic of Yugoslavia) Dušan Bajević (13 goals)

The Brazil Independence Cup was an international football tournament held in Brazil, from 11 June to 9 July 1972, to commemorate the 150th anniversary of the Brazilian Declaration of Independence. It was called the Minicopa by the Brazilians and the final was between Brazil and Portugal, in the Maracanã Stadium. Brazil won 1–0, with Jairzinho scoring in the 89th minute.

Brazil no longer had Pelé but still had Tostão, Jairzinho and Rivellino, the later two also played in the 1974 FIFA World Cup, in West Germany.

Despite Portugal's quality results and team, including Benfica players such as Eusébio, Jaime Graça, José Henrique, Humberto Coelho, Rui Jordão, and Toni, the team missed the World Cup 1974 and 1978 qualifying matches, so this tournament was their best result until the 1984 European Football Championship.

== Format ==
Twenty teams competed; 18 national teams as well as two representative sides from Africa and CONCACAF (North and Central America and the Caribbean).

=== First round ===
15 teams competed in the first round, while 5 teams (Brazil, Czechoslovakia, Scotland, Soviet Union, Uruguay) received byes to the final stage.

The teams are drawn into three groups of 5 teams. Each team plays each other team in its group once, earning 2 points for a win and 1 for a draw. The three first-placed teams advance to the final stage.

=== Final stage ===
The 8 teams are drawn into two groups of 4 teams. Each team plays each other team in its group once, earning 2 points for a win and 1 for a draw.

The two group runners-up play each other in the third-place playoff.

The two group winners play each other in the final.

== Venues ==
Host cities of the Taça Independência

The tournament was played in 12 cities: Aracaju, Belo Horizonte, Campo Grande, Curitiba, Maceió, Manaus, Natal, Porto Alegre, Recife, Rio de Janeiro, Salvador and São Paulo.

Aracaju	Belo Horizonte		Campo Grande
Batistão	Mineirão	Estádio Independência	Morenão
Capacity: 45,000	Capacity: 110,000	Capacity: 23,000	Capacity: 45,000
Curitiba	Maceió	Manaus	Natal
Estádio Couto Pereira	Estádio Rei Pelé	Vivaldão	Machadão
Capacity: 37,182	Capacity: 20,551	Capacity: 31,000	Capacity: 42,000
Porto Alegre	Recife	Rio de Janeiro	Salvador
Estádio Beira-Rio	Estádio do Arruda	Maracanã	Estádio Fonte Nova
Capacity: 106,000	Capacity: 60,000	Capacity: 200,000	Capacity: 80,000
São Paulo
Estádio do Pacaembu	Estádio do Morumbi		
Capacity: 40,000	Capacity: 120,000		

== Group stage ==
=== Group A ===
Team	Pld	W	D	L	GF	GA	GD	Pts
Argentina (A)	4	3	1	0	13	1	+12	7
France	4	3	1	0	10	2	+8	7
Africa	4	1	1	2	3	4	−1	3
Colombia	4	1	0	3	7	13	−6	2
CONCACAF	4	0	1	3	3	16	−13	1

(A) Advance to a further round
11 June 1972

Argentina	2–0	Africa
Fischer 40'; Mastrángelo 42'	Report

Batistão, Aracaju
Attendance: 12,826
Referee: José Faville Neto (Brazil)

11 June 1972

France	5–0	CONCACAF
Bereta 7'; Revelli 15', 21', 69'; Bulnes 82' (o.g.)	Report

Estádio Fonte Nova, Salvador
Attendance: 21,422
Referee: Kurt Tschenscher (West Germany)

14 June 1972

France	2–0	Africa
Blanchet 35'; Floch 83'	Report

Estádio Rei Pelé, Maceió
Attendance: 10,000
Referee: José Faville Neto (Brazil)

15 June 1972

Colombia	4–3	CONCACAF
Pineros 13'; Lugo 15', 17'; Morón 77'	Report	Reiner 38', 59'; Désir 64'

Batistão, Aracaju
Attendance: 7,642
Referee: Rafael Hormazábal Diaz (Chile)

18 June 1972

Argentina	7–0	CONCACAF
Fischer 26', 68', 81', 86'; Más 12', 65'; Bianchi 70'	Report

Estádio Rei Pelé, Maceió
Attendance: 8,587
Referee: Paul Schiller (Austria)

18 June 1972

Colombia	2–3	France
Piñeros 23' (pen.); Mesa 82'	Report	Loubet 30', 72'; Molitor 33' (pen.)

Estádio Fonte Nova, Salvador
Attendance: 10,000
Referee: Ángel Eduardo Pazos (Uruguay)

22 June 1972

CONCACAF	0–0	Africa
	Report

Estádio Fonte Nova, Salvador
Attendance: 1,928
Referee: Édison Pérez Nuñez (Peru)

22 June 1972

Argentina	4–1	Colombia
Bianchi 17', 49', 62'; Vargas 60'	Report	Morón 68'

Estádio Fonte Nova, Salvador, Brazil
Attendance: 10,000
Referee: Kurt Tschenscher (West Germany)

25 June 1972

Africa	3–0	Colombia
Pokou 8'; Tokoto 39', 55'	Report

Estádio Fonte Nova, Salvador, Brazil
Attendance: 10,579
Referee: José Romei Cañete (Paraguay)

25 June 1972

Argentina	0–0	France
	Report

Estádio Fonte Nova, Salvador
Attendance: 6,587
Referee: Armando Marques (Brazil)

=== Group B ===
Team	Pld	W	D	L	GF	GA	GD	Pts
Portugal (A)	4	4	0	0	12	2	+10	8
Chile	4	3	0	1	7	7	0	6
Republic of Ireland	4	2	0	2	7	7	0	4
Ecuador	4	0	1	3	4	9	−5	1
Iran	4	0	1	3	3	8	−5	1

(A) Advance to a further round
11 June 1972

Portugal	3–0	Ecuador
Eusébio 36'; Dinis 59'; Nené 75'	Report

Machadão, Natal
Referee: Ángel Coerezza (Argentina)

11 June 1972

Republic of Ireland	2–1	Iran
Leech 57'; Givens 74'	Report	Ghelichkhani 10'

Estádio do Arruda, Recife
Attendance: 10,500
Referee: Aurelio Angonese (Italy)

14 June 1972

Portugal	3–0	Iran
Eusébio 13'; Dinis 31'; Coelho 72'	Report

Estádio do Arruda, Recife
Attendance: 12,000
Referee: Guillermo Velásquez Ramirez (Colombia)

14 June 1972

Chile	2–1	Ecuador
Caszely ??'; Crisosto ??'	Report	Lasso ??'

Machadão, Natal
Referee: Romualdo Arppi Filho (Brazil)

18 June 1972

Portugal	4–1	Chile
Coelho 14'; Dinis 54', 66'; Eusébio 71'	Report	Caszely 56'

Estádio do Arruda, Recife
Referee: Aurelio Angonese (Italy)

18 June 1972

Republic of Ireland	3–2	Ecuador
Rogers 2'; Martin 61'; O'Connor 86'	Report	Coronel 36'; Lasso 78'

Machadão, Natal
Referee: Michael Kitabdjian (France)

21 June 1972

Ecuador	1–1	Iran
Lasso 15'	Report	Ghelichkhani 36'

Estádio do Arruda, Recife
Attendance: 5,000
Referee: Sebastião Rufino (Brazil)

21 June 1972

Chile	2–1	Republic of Ireland
Caszely 16'; Fouilloux 25'	Report	Rogers 79'

Estádio do Arruda, Recife
Referee: Romualdo Arppi Filho (Brazil)

25 June 1972

Chile	2–1	Iran
Caszely 50', 79'	Report	Halvaei 85'

Estádio do Arruda, Recife
Attendance: 15,000
Referee: Michael Kitabdjian (France)

25 June 1972

Portugal	2–1	Republic of Ireland
Peres 35'; Nené 37'	Report	Leech 38'

Estádio do Arruda, Recife
Referee: Ángel Coerezza (Argentina)

=== Group C ===
Team	Pld	W	D	L	GF	GA	GD	Pts
Yugoslavia (A)	4	3	1	0	15	3	+12	7
Paraguay	4	3	0	1	12	4	+8	6
Peru	4	2	0	2	5	3	+2	4
Bolivia	4	0	2	2	4	12	−8	2
Venezuela	4	0	1	3	3	17	−14	1

(A) Advance to a further round
11 June 1972

Peru	3–0	Bolivia
Gallardo 7' (pen.); Castañeda 16'; Sotil 31'	Report

Estádio Couto Pereira, Curitiba
Referee: Edwin Keith Walker (England)

11 June 1972

Paraguay	4–1	Venezuela
L. Jiménez 2'; Escobar 11'; Maldonado 13', 37'	Report	Olivares 26'

Morenão, Campo Grande
Referee: George Lamptey (Ghana)

14 June 1972

Yugoslavia	10–0	Venezuela
Bajević 5', 7', 48', 68', 74'; Džajić 20'; Aćimović 37'; Popivoda 44'; Stepanović 51'; Katalinski 54'	Report

Estádio Couto Pereira, Curitiba
Attendance: 5,000
Referee: Ove Dahlberg (Sweden)

14 June 1972

Paraguay	1–0	Peru
Godoy 89'	Report

Morenão, Campo Grande
Referee: Abraham Klein (Israel)

18 June 1972

Yugoslavia	1–1	Bolivia
Katalinski 32'	Report	Pariente 78'

Morenão, Campo Grande
Attendance: 15,000
Referee: Abraham Klein (Israel)

18 June 1972

Peru	1–0	Venezuela
O. Ramírez 65'	Report

Vivaldão, Manaus
Referee: Arnaldo Cézar Coelho (Brazil)

21 June 1972

Venezuela	2–2	Bolivia
Iriarte 15'; Mendoza 49'	Report	Rimazza 5'; Blacutt 57'

Vivaldão, Manaus
Referee: Oei Poh Hwa (Malaysia)

22 June 1972

Yugoslavia	2–1	Paraguay
Bajević 50', 86'	Report	Escobar 17'

Vivaldão, Manaus
Attendance: 25,000
Referee: Abraham Klein (Israel)

25 June 1972

Paraguay	6–1	Bolivia
Maldonado 7', 67'; Arrúa 57', 59', 67' dos Santos 86'	Report	Molinas 63' (o.g.)

Vivaldão, Manaus
Referee: Arnaldo Cézar Coelho (Brazil)

25 June 1972

Yugoslavia	2–1	Peru
Bajević 4', 37'	Report	O. Ramírez 11'

Vivaldão, Manaus
Attendance: 20,000
Referee: Alfonso González Archundía (Mexico)

== Final stage ==
=== Group A ===
Pos	Team	Pld	W	D	L	GF	GA	GD	Pts
1	Brazil (A)	3	2	1	0	4	0	+4	5
2	Yugoslavia (A)	3	1	1	1	4	6	−2	3
3	Scotland	3	0	2	1	2	3	−1	2
4	Czechoslovakia	3	0	2	1	1	2	−1	2

(A) Advance to a further round
28 June 1972

Brazil	0–0	Czechoslovakia
	Report

Estádio do Maracanã, Rio de Janeiro
Attendance: 115,000
Referee: Kurt Tschenscher (West Germany)

29 June 1972

Scotland	2–2	Yugoslavia
Macari 39', 63'	Report	Bajević 60'; Buchan 87' (o.g.)

Mineirão, Belo Horizonte
Attendance: 4,000
Referee: Ángel Coerezza (Argentina)

2 July 1972

Brazil	3–0	Yugoslavia
Leivinha 22', 25'; Jairzinho 65'	Report

Estádio do Morumbi, São Paulo
Attendance: 100,000
Referee: Ove Dahlberg (Sweden)

2 July 1972

Scotland	0–0	Czechoslovakia
	Report

Estádio Beira-Rio, Porto Alegre
Attendance: 15,000
Referee: Armando Marques (Brazil)

5 July 1972

Brazil	1–0	Scotland
Jairzinho 82'	Report

Estádio do Maracanã, Rio de Janeiro
Attendance: 130,000
Referee: Abraham Klein (Israel)

6 July 1972

Yugoslavia	2–1	Czechoslovakia
Bajević 19'; Džajić 77'	Report	Hrušecký 37'

Estádio do Pacaembu, São Paulo
Attendance: 3,000
Referee: Armando Marques (Brazil)

=== Group B ===
Pos	Team	Pld	W	D	L	GF	GA	GD	Pts
1	Portugal (A)	3	2	1	0	5	2	+3	5
2	Argentina (A)	3	2	0	1	3	3	0	4
3	Soviet Union	3	1	0	2	1	2	−1	2
4	Uruguay	3	0	1	2	1	3	−2	1

(A) Advance to a further round
29 June 1972

Soviet Union	1–0	Uruguay
Onishchenko 59'	Report

Estádio do Morumbi, São Paulo
Attendance: 10,000
Referee: Abraham Klein (Israel)

29 June 1972

Portugal	3–1	Argentina
Calisto 36'; Eusébio 45'; Dinis 47'	Report	Brindisi 29'

Estádio do Maracanã, Rio de Janeiro
Referee: Edwin Keith Walker (England)

2 July 1972

Uruguay	1–1	Portugal
Pavoni 20'	Report	Graça 46'

Estádio do Maracanã, Rio de Janeiro
Attendance: 50,000
Referee: Rudolf Scheurer (Switzerland)

2 July 1972

Argentina	1–0	Soviet Union
Pastoriza 75'	Report

Mineirão, Belo Horizonte
Attendance: 8,000
Referee: Alfonso González Archundía (Mexico)

6 July 1972

Portugal	1–0	Soviet Union
Jordão 46'	Report

Mineirão, Belo Horizonte
Attendance: 12,000
Referee: Kurt Tschenscher (West Germany)

6 July 1972

Argentina	1–0	Uruguay
Más 37'	Report

Estádio Beira-Rio, Porto Alegre
Referee: Edwin Keith Walker (England)

=== Third place match ===
9 July 1972

Yugoslavia	4–2	Argentina
Bajević 26', 83'; Katalinski 37'; Džajić 64'	Report	Brindisi 58' (pen.), 87' (pen.)

Estádio do Maracanã, Rio de Janeiro
Attendance: 170,000
Referee: Paul Schiller (Austria)

=== Final ===
9 July 1972

Brazil	1–0	Portugal
Jairzinho 89'	Report

Estádio do Maracanã, Rio de Janeiro
Attendance: 99,138
Referee: Abraham Klein (Israel)

== Statistics ==
=== Goalscorers ===
There were 57 goals scored in 16 matches, for an average of 3.56 goals per match.

13 goals

- (Socialist Federal Republic of Yugoslavia) Dušan Bajević

5 goals

- (Argentina) Rodolfo Fischer
- (Chile) Carlos Caszely
- (Portugal) Joaquim Dinis

4 goals

- (Argentina) Carlos Bianchi
- (Portugal) Eusébio
- (Paraguay) Cristóbal Maldonado

3 goals

- (Argentina) Miguel Ángel Brindisi
- (Argentina) Oscar Más
- (Brazil) Jairzinho
- (Ecuador) Félix Lasso
- (France) Hervé Revelli
- (Paraguay) Saturnino Arrúa
- (Socialist Federal Republic of Yugoslavia) Dragan Džajić
- (Socialist Federal Republic of Yugoslavia) Josip Katalinski

2 goals

- (Brazil) Leivinha
- (Cameroon) Jean-Pierre Tokoto
- (Colombia) Carlos Lugo
- (Colombia) Jaime Morón
- (Colombia) Hernando Pineros
- (France) Charly Loubet
- (Republic of Ireland) Mick Leech
- (Republic of Ireland) Eamonn Rogers
- (Iran) Parviz Ghelichkhani
- (Peru) Oswaldo Ramírez
- (Portugal) Humberto Coelho
- (Portugal) Nené
- (Paraguay) Adalberto Escobar
- (Scotland) Lou Macari
- (Suriname) Edwin Reiner

1 goal

- (Argentina) Ernesto Mastrángelo
- (Argentina) José Omar Pastoriza
- (Argentina) Ángel Vargas
- (Bolivia) Ramiro Blacutt
- (Bolivia) Mario Pariente
- (Bolivia) Jaime Rimazza
- (Ivory Coast) Laurent Pokou
- (Chile) Julio Crisosto
- (Chile) Alberto Fouilloux
- (Colombia) Orlando Mesa
- (Czechoslovakia) Anton Hrušecký
- (Ecuador) Miguel Coronel
- (France) Georges Bereta
- (France) Bernard Blanchet
- (France) Louis Floch
- (France) Marc Molitor
- (Haiti) Jean-Claude Désir
- (Republic of Ireland) Don Givens
- (Republic of Ireland) Mick Martin
- (Republic of Ireland) Turlough O'Connor
- (Iran) Majid Halvaei
- (Peru) Hernán Castañeda
- (Peru) Alberto Gallardo
- (Peru) Hugo Sotil
- (Portugal) Adolfo Calisto
- (Portugal) Jaime Graça
- (Portugal) Rui Jordão
- (Portugal) Fernando Peres
- (Paraguay) Emigdio dos Santos
- (Paraguay) Tiberio Godoy
- (Paraguay) Lorenzo Jiménez
- (Soviet Union) Vladimir Onishchenko
- (Uruguay) Ricardo Pavoni
- (Venezuela) Ramón Iriarte
- (Venezuela) Luis Mendoza
- (Venezuela) Asdrúbal Olivares
- (Socialist Federal Republic of Yugoslavia) Jovan Aćimović
- (Socialist Federal Republic of Yugoslavia) Danilo Popivoda
- (Socialist Federal Republic of Yugoslavia) Dragoslav Stepanović

3 own goals

- (Honduras) Fernando Bulnes (against France)
- (Paraguay) Pedro Molinas (against Bolivia)
- (Scotland) Martin Buchan (against Yugoslavia)

== Hat-tricks ==
Brazil Independence Cup hat-tricks
#	Player	G	Time of goals	For	Result	Against	Phase	Date	FIFA report
1.	Hervé Revelli	3	15', 21', 69'	France	5-0	CONCACAF	Group stage	11 June 1972	Report
2.	Dušan Bajević	5	5', 7', 48', 68', 74'	Yugoslavia	10-0	Venezuela	Group stage	14 June 1972	Report
3.	Rodolfo Fischer	4	26', 68', 81', 86'	Argentina	7-0	CONCACAF	Group stage	18 June 1972	Report
4.	Carlos Bianchi	3	17', 49', 62'	Argentina	4-1	Colombia	Group stage	22 June 1972	Report
5.	Saturnino Arrúa	3	57', 59', 67'	Paraguay	6-1	Bolivia	Group stage	25 June 1972	Report
