= 1970 FIFA World Cup qualification – UEFA Group 2 =

Football tournament qualification stage

The 1970 FIFA World Cup qualification UEFA Group 2 was a UEFA qualifying group for the 1970 FIFA World Cup. The group comprised Czechoslovakia, Denmark, Hungary and Republic of Ireland.

== Standings ==
Rank	Team	Pld	W	D	L	GF	GA	GD	Pts
1=	Hungary	6	4	1	1	16	7	+9	9
1=	Czechoslovakia	6	4	1	1	12	6	+6	9
3	Denmark	6	2	1	3	6	10	−4	5
4	Republic of Ireland	6	0	1	5	3	14	−11	1

== Matches ==
25 September 1968

Denmark	0–3	Czechoslovakia
	Report	Jokl 11'; Kuna 22'; Hagara 80'

Idrætsparken, Copenhagen
Attendance: 30,258
Referee: Hirviniemi (Finland)

20 October 1968

Czechoslovakia	1–0	Denmark
Jokl 56'	Report

Tehelné pole, Bratislava
Attendance: 14,249
Referee: Anton Bucheli (Switzerland)

4 December 1968

Republic of Ireland	1–1 (Abandoned 50')	Denmark
Giles 40' (pen.)		Wiberg 21'

Dalymount Park, Dublin
Referee: Syme (Scotland)

4 May 1969

Republic of Ireland	1–2	Czechoslovakia
Rogers 17'	Report	Kabát 51'; Adamec 71'

Dalymount Park, Dublin
Referee: Ribeiro (Portugal)

25 May 1969

Hungary	2–0	Czechoslovakia
A. Dunai 11'; Albert 88'	Report

Népstadion, Budapest
Attendance: 72,938
Referee: Bentu (Romania)

27 May 1969

Denmark	2–0	Republic of Ireland
O. Sørensen 34', 66'	Report

Idrætsparken, Copenhagen
Attendance: 26,195
Referee: Archipow (Soviet Union)

8 June 1969

Republic of Ireland	1–2	Hungary
Givens 59'	Report	A. Dunai 23'; Bene 80'

Dalymount Park, Dublin
Attendance: 17,268
Referee: Loraux (Belgium)

15 June 1969

Denmark	3–2	Hungary
O. Sørensen 3'; Le Fevre 35'; O. Madsen 63'	Report	Bene 7'; Farkas 39'

Idrætsparken, Copenhagen
Attendance: 29,957
Referee: Sirevaag (Norway)

14 September 1969

Czechoslovakia	3–3	Hungary
Hagara 26'; Kvašňák 51'; Kuna 75'	Report	Bene 9'; A. Dunai 36'; Fazekas 48'

Stadion Letná, Prague
Attendance: 33,907
Referee: Tschenscher (West Germany)

7 October 1969

Czechoslovakia	3–0	Republic of Ireland
Adamec 9', 37', 45'	Report

Stadion Letná, Prague
Attendance: 32,879
Referee: Lo Bello (Italy)

15 October 1969

Republic of Ireland	1–1	Denmark
Givens 11'	Report	B. Jensen 84' (pen.)

Dalymount Park, Dublin
Attendance: 19,603
Referee: Paterson (Scotland)

22 October 1969

Hungary	3–0	Denmark
Bene 15', 88'; Szűcs 28'	Report

Népstadion, Budapest
Attendance: 32,852
Referee: Ott (West Germany)

5 November 1969

Hungary	4–0	Republic of Ireland
Halmosi 30'; Bene 49'; L. Puskás 68'; L. Kocsis 83'	Report

Népstadion, Budapest
Attendance: 23,602
Referee: Jakse (Yugoslavia)

Czechoslovakia and Hungary finished level on points, and a play-off on neutral ground was played to decide who would qualify.

3 December 1969

Czechoslovakia	4–1	Hungary
Kvašňák 44' (pen.); Veselý 57'; Adamec 65'; Jokl 80'	Report	L. Kocsis 90' (pen.)

Stade Vélodrome, Marseille
Attendance: 7,857
Referee: Machin (France)
