= 1964 European Nations' Cup qualifying preliminary round =

European football tournament round

The 1964 European Nations' Cup qualifying preliminary round was the first round of the qualifying competition for the 1964 European Nations' Cup. It was contested by 26 of the 29 teams that entered, with Austria, Luxembourg and the Soviet Union receiving a bye to the following round. The winners of each of thirteen home-and-away ties progressed to the round of 16. The matches were played in 1962 and 1963.

== Summary ==
Team 1	Agg.	Team 2	1st leg	2nd leg	Replay
Norway	1–3	Sweden	0–2	1–1	
Greece	w.o. (Note: Greece withdrew from the competition after they were drawn against Albania in the preliminary round, so Albania were awarded a walkover victory.)	Albania	Canc.	Canc.	
Denmark	9–2	Malta	6–1	3–1	
Republic of Ireland	5–3	Iceland	4–2	1–1	
England	3–6	France	1–1	2–5	
Poland	0–4	Northern Ireland	0–2	0–2	
Spain	7–3	Romania	6–0	1–3	
Yugoslavia	4–2	Belgium	3–2	1–0	
Bulgaria	5–4	Portugal	3–1	1–3	1–0
Hungary	4–2	Wales	3–1	1–1	
Netherlands	4–2	Switzerland	3–1	1–1	
East Germany	3–2	Czechoslovakia	2–1	1–1	
Italy	7–0	Turkey	6–0	1–0	

== Matches ==
The thirteen matches took place over two legs, taking place in 1962 and 1963.

21 June 1962
19:15 UTC+1

Norway	0–2	Sweden
	Report	Martinsson 10', 40'

Ullevål, Oslo
Attendance: 28,249
Referee: Gilbert Bowman (Scotland)
4 November 1962
13:00 UTC+1

Sweden	1–1	Norway
Eriksson 49'	Report	Krogh 60'

Malmö Stadion, Malmö
Attendance: 8,726
Referee: Werner Bergmann (East Germany)

Sweden won 3–1 on aggregate and advanced to the round of 16.

21 June 1962

Greece	Cancelled	Albania
	Report

31 March 1963

Albania	Cancelled	Greece
	Report

Greece withdrew. Albania had a walkover and advanced to the round of 16.

28 June 1962

Denmark	6–1	Malta
O. Madsen 9', 14', 49'; Clausen 22'; Enoksen 71'; Bertelsen 80'	Report	Theobald 57'

Idrætsparken, Copenhagen
Attendance: 10,622
Referee: Pieter Roomer (Netherlands)
8 December 1962

Malta	1–3	Denmark
Urpani 39'	Report	O. Madsen 14'; Christiansen 42'; Bertelsen 47'

Empire Stadium, Gżira
Attendance: 6,987
Referee: Raoul Righi (Italy)

Denmark won 9–2 on aggregate and advanced to the round of 16.

12 August 1962

Republic of Ireland	4–2	Iceland
Tuohy 11'; Fogarty 41'; Cantwell 65', 76'	Report	R. Jónsson 37', 86'

Dalymount Park, Dublin
Attendance: 19,848
Referee: Robert Ernest Smith (Wales)
2 September 1962
16:30 UTC

Iceland	1–1	Republic of Ireland
Árnason 59'	Report	Tuohy 38'

Laugardalsvöllur, Reykjavík
Attendance: 9,014
Referee: Birger Nielsen (Norway)

Republic of Ireland won 5–3 on aggregate and advanced to the round of 16.

3 October 1962

England	1–1	France
Flowers 57' (pen.)	Report	Goujon 8'

Hillsborough, Sheffield
Attendance: 35,380
Referee: Frede Hansen (Denmark)
27 February 1963

France	5–2	England
Wisnieski 3', 75'; Douis 32'; Cossou 43', 82'	Report	Smith 57'; Tambling 74'

Parc des Princes, Paris
Attendance: 23,986
Referee: Josef Kandlbinder (West Germany)

France won 6–3 on aggregate and advanced to the round of 16.

10 October 1962

Poland	0–2	Northern Ireland
	Report	Dougan 17'; Humphries 54'

Stadion Śląski, Chorzów
Attendance: 31,496
Referee: Bertil Wilhelm Lööw (Sweden)
28 November 1962

Northern Ireland	2–0	Poland
Crossan 8'; Bingham 63'	Report

Windsor Park, Belfast
Attendance: 28,833
Referee: Dittmar Huber (Switzerland)

Northern Ireland won 4–0 on aggregate and advanced to the round of 16.

1 November 1962

Spain	6–0	Romania
Guillot 7', 27', 70'; Veloso 9'; Collar 17'; I. Nunweiller 81' (o.g.)	Report

Santiago Bernabéu, Madrid
Attendance: 51,608
Referee: Kevin Howley (England)
25 November 1962

Romania	3–1	Spain
Tătaru 2'; Manolache 8'; Constantin 61'	Report	Veloso 70'

Stadionul 23 August, Bucharest
Attendance: 72,762
Referee: Georgios Pelomis (Greece)

Spain won 7–3 on aggregate and advanced to the round of 16.

4 November 1962
14:15 UTC+1

Yugoslavia	3–2	Belgium
Skoblar 12', 32' (pen.); Vasović 89'	Report	Stockman 26'; Jurion 58'

Stadion JNA, Belgrade
Attendance: 25,430
Referee: Alois Obtulovic (Czechoslovakia)
31 March 1963
16:00 UTC+1

Belgium	0–1	Yugoslavia
	Report	Galić 21'

Heysel Stadium, Brussels
Attendance: 24,583
Referee: Vicente Antonio Caballero (Spain)

Yugoslavia won 4–2 on aggregate and advanced to the round of 16.

7 November 1962

Bulgaria	3–1	Portugal
Asparuhov 65', 76'; Diev 84'	Report	Eusébio 49'

Vasil Levski Stadium, Sofia
Attendance: 31,318
Referee: Semih Zoroglu (Turkey)
16 December 1962

Portugal	3–1	Bulgaria
Hernâni 4', 26'; Coluna 53'	Report	Iliev 83'

Estádio do Restelo, Lisbon
Attendance: 25,836
Referee: Henri Faucheux (France)

4–4 on aggregate. A replay was played on a neutral ground to determine the winner.

23 January 1963

Bulgaria	1–0	Portugal
Asparuhov 87'	Report

Stadio Olimpico, Rome
Attendance: 2,336
Referee: Giuseppe Adami (Italy)

Bulgaria won 5–4 on aggregate and advanced to the round of 16.

7 November 1962
14:00 UTC+1

Hungary	3–1	Wales
Albert 5'; Tichy 34'; Sándor 48'	Report	Medwin 19'

Népstadion, Budapest
Attendance: 30,412
Referee: Józef Kowal (Poland)
20 March 1963
19:15 UTC

Wales	1–1	Hungary
Jones 23' (pen.)	Report	Tichy 77' (pen.)

Ninian Park, Cardiff
Attendance: 30,413
Referee: John Spillane (Republic of Ireland)

Hungary won 4–2 on aggregate and advanced to the round of 16.

11 November 1962
14:30 UTC+1

Netherlands	3–1	Switzerland
Van der Linden 11'; Swart 74'; Groot 76'	Report	Hertig 42'

Olympisch stadion, Amsterdam
Attendance: 59,996
Referee: Joaquim Fernandes Campos (Portugal)
31 March 1963
15:00 UTC+1

Switzerland	1–1	Netherlands
Allemann 37'	Report	Kruiver 6'

Wankdorf Stadium, Bern
Attendance: 31,794
Referee: Josef Kandlbinder (West Germany)

Netherlands won 4–2 on aggregate and advanced to the round of 16.

21 November 1962

East Germany	2–1	Czechoslovakia
Erler 60'; Liebrecht 80' (pen.)	Report	Kučera 90'

Walter-Ulbricht-Stadion, East Berlin
Attendance: 22,077
Referee: Serguei Alimov (Soviet Union)
31 March 1963

Czechoslovakia	1–1	East Germany
Mašek 66'	Report	P. Ducke 85'

Strahov Stadium, Prague
Attendance: 19,504
Referee: Károly Balla (Hungary)

East Germany won 3–2 on aggregate and advanced to the round of 16.

2 December 1962
14:30 UTC+1

Italy	6–0	Turkey
Rivera 15', 47'; Orlando 22', 29', 35', 85'	Report

Stadio Comunale, Bologna
Attendance: 26,553
Referee: Lucien van Nuffel (Belgium)
27 March 1963
13:30 UTC+1

Turkey	0–1	Italy
	Report	Sormani 86'

Mithat Paşa Stadium, Istanbul
Attendance: 31,754
Referee: Dimitar Rumenchev (Bulgaria)

Italy won 7–0 on aggregate and advanced to the round of 16.

== Goalscorers ==
There were 85 goals scored in 25 matches, for an average of 3.4 goals per match.

4 goals

- (Denmark national football team) Ole Madsen
- (Italy national football team) Alberto Orlando

3 goals

- (Bulgaria national football team) Georgi Asparuhov
- (Spain national football team) Vicente Guillot

2 goals

- (Denmark national football team) Carl Bertelsen
- (France national football team) Lucien Cossou
- (France national football team) Maryan Wisnieski
- (Hungary national football team) Lajos Tichy
- (Iceland national football team) Ríkharður Jónsson
- (Italy national football team) Gianni Rivera
- (Portugal national football team) Hernâni
- (Republic of Ireland national football team) Noel Cantwell
- (Republic of Ireland national football team) Liam Tuohy
- (Spain national football team) José Luis Veloso
- (Sweden men's national football team) Örjan Martinsson
- (Yugoslavia national football team) Josip Skoblar

1 goal

- (Belgium national football team) Armand Jurion
- (Belgium national football team) Jacques Stockman
- (Bulgaria national football team) Todor Diev
- (Bulgaria national football team) Hristo Iliev
- (Czechoslovakia national football team) Rudolf Kučera
- (Czechoslovakia national football team) Václav Mašek
- (Denmark national football team) Carl Emil Christiansen
- (Denmark national football team) Eyvind Clausen
- (Denmark national football team) Henning Enoksen
- (East Germany national football team) Peter Ducke
- (East Germany national football team) Dieter Erler
- (East Germany national football team) Kurt Liebrecht
- (England national football team) Ron Flowers
- (England national football team) Bobby Smith
- (England national football team) Bobby Tambling
- (France national football team) Yvon Douis
- (France national football team) Yvon Goujon
- (Hungary national football team) Flórián Albert
- (Hungary national football team) Károly Sándor
- (Iceland national football team) Garðar Árnason
- (Italy national football team) Angelo Sormani
- (Malta national football team) Eddie Theobald
- (Malta national football team) Joseph Urpani
- (Netherlands national football team) Henk Groot
- (Netherlands national football team) Piet Kruiver
- (Netherlands national football team) Sjaak Swart
- (Netherlands national football team) Tonny van der Linden
- (Northern Ireland national football team) Billy Bingham
- (Northern Ireland national football team) Johnny Crossan
- (Northern Ireland national football team) Derek Dougan
- (Northern Ireland national football team) Billy Humphries
- (Norway national football team) John Krogh
- (Portugal national football team) Mário Coluna
- (Portugal national football team) Eusébio
- (Republic of Ireland national football team) Amby Fogarty
- (Romania national football team) Gheorghe Constantin
- (Romania national football team) Cicerone Manolache
- (Romania national football team) Nicolae Tătaru
- (Spain national football team) Enrique Collar
- (Sweden men's national football team) Leif Eriksson
- (Switzerland national football team) Anton Allemann
- (Switzerland national football team) Charly Hertig
- (Wales national football team) Cliff Jones
- (Wales national football team) Terry Medwin
- (Yugoslavia national football team) Milan Galić
- (Yugoslavia national football team) Velibor Vasović

1 own goal

- (Romania national football team) Ion Nunweiller (against Spain)
