= Pat Saward =

Irish footballer and manager (1928–2002)

Personal information
- Date of birth: 17 August 1928
- Place of birth: Cobh, Ireland
- Date of death: 20 September 2002 (aged 74)
- Place of death: Newark-on-Trent, England
- Position: Defender

Youth career
- Crystal Palace

Senior career*
Years	Team	Apps	(Gls)
- Beckenham Town
1951–1955	Millwall	118	(14)
1955–1961	Aston Villa	152	(2)
1961–1963	Huddersfield Town	59	(1)
- Crawley Town

International career^{‡}
1954–1962	Republic of Ireland	18	(0)

Managerial career
- 1970–1973: Brighton & Hove Albion
- 1975–??: Al-Nasr
- * Club domestic league appearances and goals as of 25 August 2007 ‡ National team caps and goals as of 25 August 2007

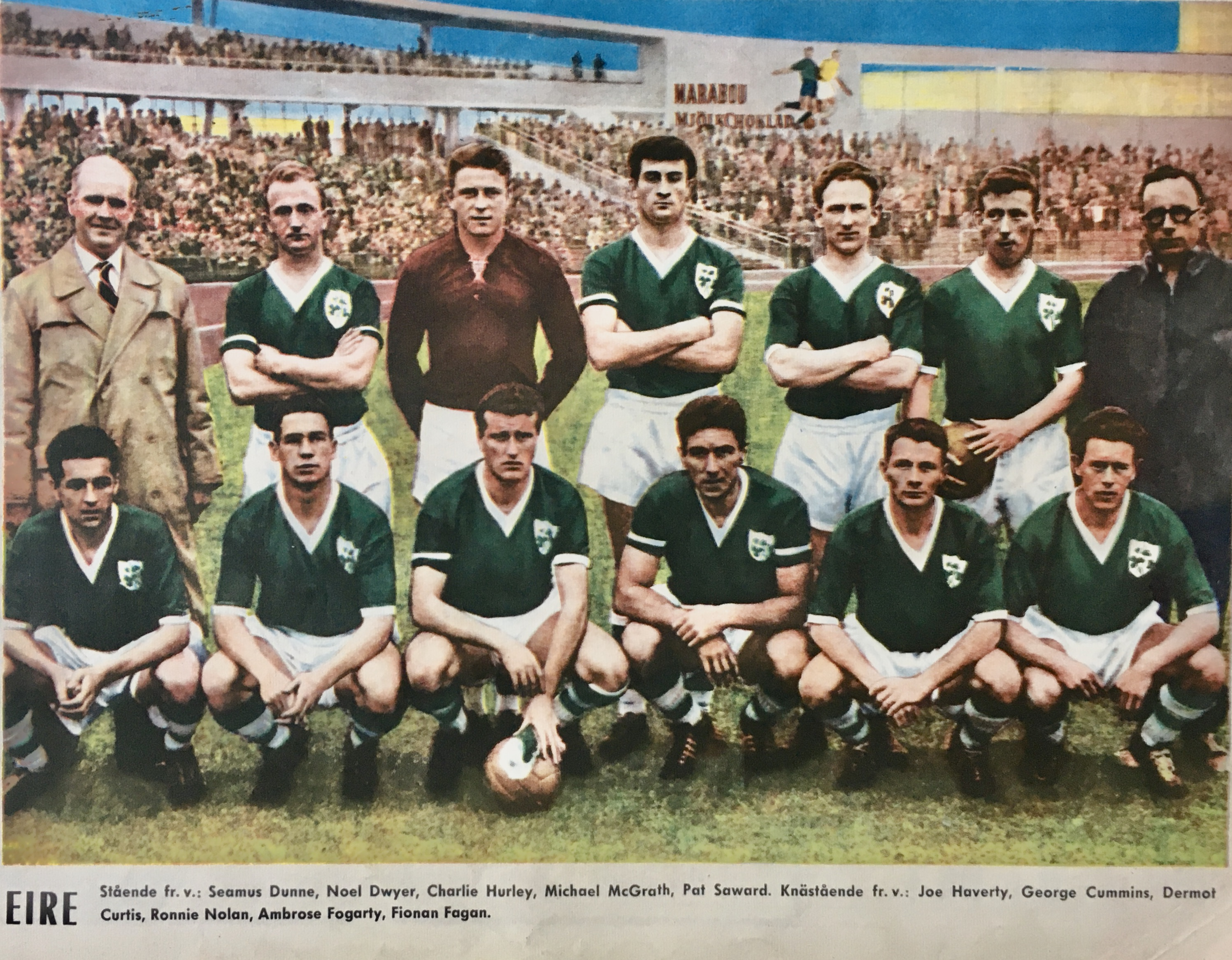
The Republic of Ireland national football team had a match in Sweden against the Sweden national team in May 1960 – players of the team from left to right, standing; Seamus Dunne, Noel Dwyer, Charlie Hurley. Michael McGrath, Pat Saward; crouched: Joe Haverty, George Cummins, Dermot Curtis, Ronnie Nolan, Ambrose "Amby" Fogarty and Fionan "Paddy" Fagan.

Patrick Saward (17 August 1928 – 20 September 2002) was an Irish professional footballer in the English football League and for the Republic of Ireland.

== Career ==
=== Club ===
Playing as an amateur for Crystal Palace, Saward joined non-league club Beckenham Town, where he started his senior career. In 1951, before he joined Millwall as a professional. He made 118 league appearances for Millwall before joining Aston Villa for £10,000 in the summer of 1955. During his time at Villa Park he won the FA Cup and the Second Division championship in 1960. He joined Huddersfield Town in 1961, playing 59 league games for the club. In October 1963, Saward signed for Coventry City but never played a first team game for the Sky Blues.

=== International ===
He played at an international level for the Republic of Ireland, winning 18 caps.

== Managerial career ==
After retiring as a player, Saward joined the youth team coaching staff at Coventry City, before becoming assistant manager to Jimmy Hill at the club. At Coventry he had responsibility for the youth team and was in charge as the club reached the FA Youth Cup finals in 1968 and 1970. He brought through many outstanding youngsters through to the first team including Willie Carr, Jeff Blockley and Dennis Mortimer. In July 1970, Saward was appointed manager of Brighton & Hove Albion, winning promotion to the Second Division in 1972. In October 1973, following a bottom placed finish and relegation back to the Third Division, Saward was sacked and replaced by Brian Clough. Following his spell at Brighton, Saward coached in Saudi Arabia, as well as managing Emirati club Al-Nasr.

== Later life ==
After retiring he stayed in Dubai until health issues necessitated a return to the United Kingdom to be near family. He died in September 2002, aged 74, as a result of Bronchial pneumonia. He had also suffered from Alzheimer's disease.

== Honours ==
Aston Villa

- FA Cup: 1956–57
