= Josie Urpani =

Maltese footballer (1936–2020)

Personal information
- Full name: Joseph Urpani
- Date of birth: 12 October 1936
- Place of birth: St. Julian's, Malta
- Date of death: 19 January 2020 (aged 83)
- Place of death: Malta
- Position: Attacking midfielder

Youth career
- Floriana Colts
- –1952: Mosta Athletic
- 1952–1954: Valletta

Senior career*
Years	Team	Apps	(Gls)
1954–1968	Valletta	150+	(56)

International career
1958–1966	Malta	7	(1)

Managerial career
- 1970–1972: Valletta
- 1975–1976: Valletta
- * Club domestic league appearances and goals

Joseph Urpani (12 October 1936 – 19 January 2020) was a Maltese footballer who played as an attacking midfielder.

== Club career ==
Urpani played youth football for Floriana Colts and Mosta Athletic, before joining the academy of Valletta in 1952. He made his Maltese First Division debut for the club at the age of 18 on 28 November 1954, during a 2–0 win against Birkirkara. He made over 150 appearances for Valletta in the First Division, scoring 56 goals, and an additional 7 goals in 23 appearances in other competitions. Additionally, he finished as the First Division's second-highest goalscorer in the 1963–64 season with 10 goals, only one goal behind teammate and top scorer Alfred Borg.

He is considered one of Valletta's best players from the 1960s, winning three league titles, two Maltese FA Trophy, a Cassar Cup, and a Scicluna Cup with the club.

== International career ==
Urpani made his debut for the Malta national team in January 1958, during a 3–0 win against a Denmark XI, which was the national team's largest win at the time. In total, he made seven appearances for the national team, scoring once in a 3–1 defeat to Denmark in the 1964 European Nations' Cup qualifying preliminary round.

At international level, Urpani made his bow for Malta in the 3-0 friendly win against Denmark XI on January 25, 1958, becoming the second Valletta FC player, together with Jackie Grech, to don the Malta shirt after Joe Cilia.

== Managerial career ==
Following his retirement, he had two stints as the manager of Valletta from 1970 to 1972, and from 1975 to 1976.

== Death ==
Urpani died on 19 January 2020, at the age of 83.
