= Ronnie Nolan =

Irish footballer (1933–2023)

Personal information
- Full name: Ronald Christopher Nolan
- Date of birth: 22 October 1933
- Place of birth: Dublin, Ireland
- Date of death: 21 June 2023 (aged 89)
- Position: Wing-half

Youth career
- 1951–1952: Johnville

Senior career*
| Years | Team | Apps | (Gls) |
| 1952–1969 | Shamrock Rovers | 297 | (42) |
| 1967 | → Boston Rovers (loan) | 9 | (0) |
| 1969–1974 | Bohemians | 19 | (0) |

International career
| 1954–1964 | League of Ireland XI | 33 | (0) |
| 1956–1962 | Republic of Ireland | 10 | (2) |
- * Club domestic league appearances and goals

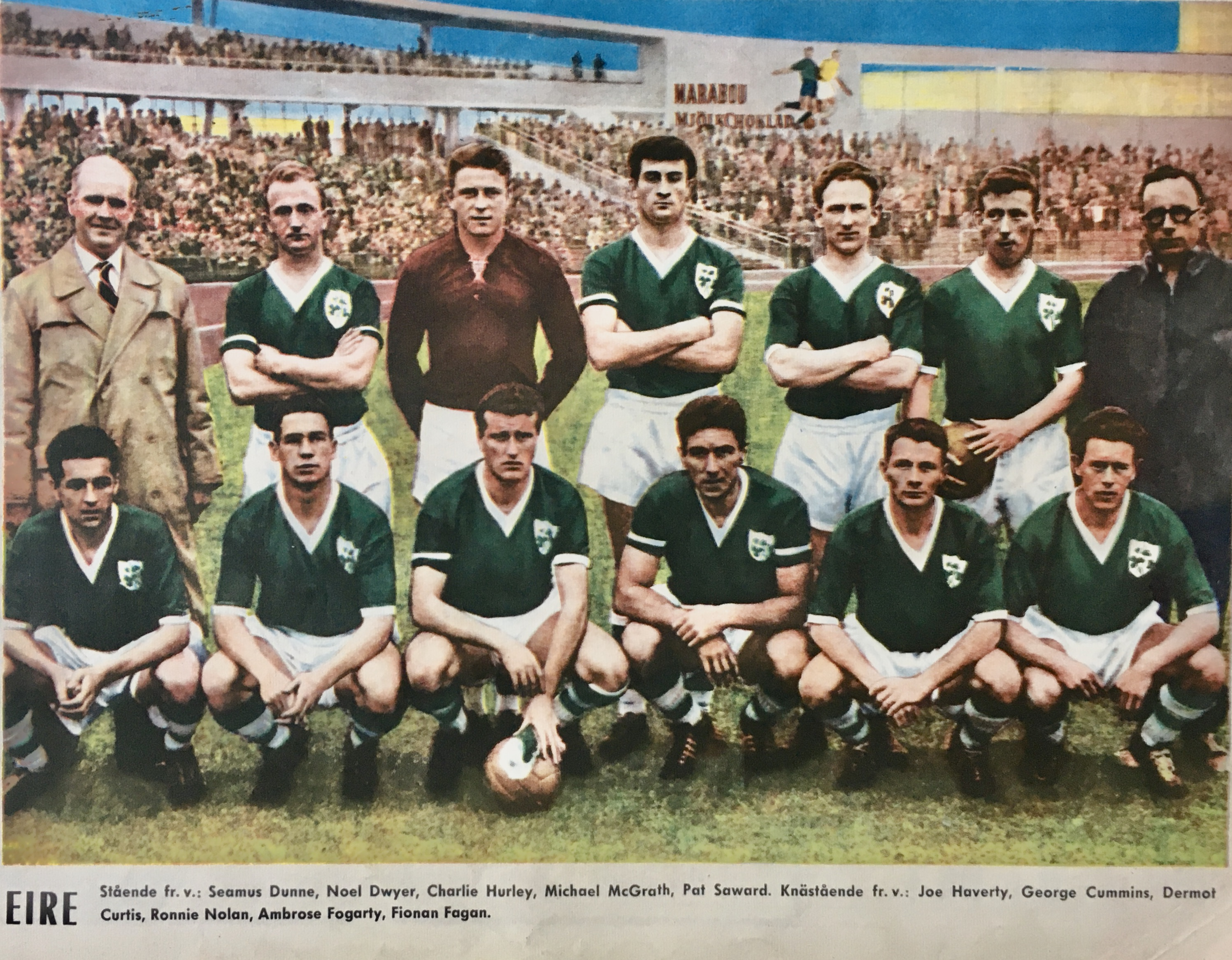
The Republic of Ireland national football team had a match in Sweden against the Sweden men's national football team in May 1960 – players of the team from left to right, standing; Seamus Dunne, Noel Dwyer, Charlie Hurley. Michael McGrath, Pat Saward; crouched: Joe Haverty, George Cummins, Dermot Curtis, Ronnie Nolan, Ambrose "Amby" Fogarty and Fionan "Paddy" Fagan.

Ronald Christopher Nolan (22 October 1933 – 21 June 2023) was an Irish footballer who played as a wing-half. At international level, he represented the Republic of Ireland national team, making ten appearances and scoring twice.

== Career ==
After earning one schoolboy cap in 1949 and captaining the international youths twice he made his Shamrock Rovers debut on 1 September 1952 in a Dublin City Cup game against Drumcondra. He went on to become part of the teams of the 1950s and was the scorer of a last-minute winning goal in the 1956 FAI Cup final against Cork Athletic. The side, popularly known as Coad's Colts, enjoyed many memorable days during the 1950s, but that day was surely that side's most dramatic. He played in the club's first 18 games in European competition.

Nolan shared a benefit game with Shay Keogh in May 1961.

Nolan's service to Rovers was marked by the presentation of a gold medal by the directors, given to any Rovers player who had completed 15 consecutive years of service to the club..

Nolan also had a spell as player and assistant manager at Bohemians during which time he picked up another FAI Cup winners medal in 1970. In all he played in 13 FAI Cup Finals.

A strong, uncompromising defender, Noland won ten caps for the Republic of Ireland national team. His first cap came on 3 October 1956 in a 2–1 win over Denmark at Dalymount Park in a World Cup qualifying game. He also won two Republic of Ireland B caps, scoring on his debut in Iceland in 1958 and won a record 33 League of Ireland XI caps.

Nolan also coached Bank of Ireland in the Leinster Senior League Senior Division and coached the team to an All Ireland IBOA cup winning performance.

Nolan worked in the Irish Glass Bottle Co Ltd in Ringsend Dublin while he continued his football career. He worked in the mould repair shop and became Mould Shop manager until his eventual retirement.

The FAI unveiled a commemorative alcove in his honour in August 2009.

== Death ==
Nolan died on 21 June 2023, at the age of 89.

== Sources ==
- Paul Doolan; Robert Goggins. The Hoops. ISBN 0-7171-2121-6.
- Stephen McGarrigle (1996). The Complete Who's Who of Irish International Football, 1945-96.
