= Charly Hertig =

Swiss footballer (1939–2012)

Personal information
- Full name: Charles Hertig
- Date of birth: 22 October 1939
- Place of birth: Switzerland
- Date of death: 6 August 2012 (aged 72)
- Place of death: Switzerland
- Positions: Centre-back; midfielder

Senior career*
Years	Team	Apps	(Gls)
1957–1958	Servette		
1958–1966	Lausanne-Sport		
1966–1967	Young Boys		
1967–1970	Lausanne-Sport		
1970–1972	Monthey	19	(1)

International career
1962–1966	Switzerland	5	(1)

Managerial career
- 1972–1973: Yverdon Sport
- 1979–1982: Lausanne-Sport
- * Club domestic league appearances and goals

Charles "Charly" Hertig (22 October 1939 – 6 August 2012) was a Swiss footballer and manager who played as a centre-back or midfielder and made five appearances for the Switzerland national team.

== Club career ==
Hertig was part of the Lausanne-Sport team, one of the greatest in the club's history, which would be nicknamed the "Lords of the Night" (French: Seigneurs de la Nuit), as they played and shone particularly at night while most other teams played Sunday afternoon. The team was coached by Austrian Karl Rappan, and included Richard Dürr, André Grobéty, Heinz Schneiter and Ely Tacchella. The team won two Swiss Cup titles in 1962 and 1964, before winning the 1964–65 Nationalliga A, the club's seventh and most recent national championship title.

== International career ==
Hertig made his debut for Switzerland on 11 November 1962 in a 1964 European Nations' Cup qualifying match against the Netherlands, scoring the only goal for Switzerland in the 1–3 loss. He went on to make five appearances, scoring one goal, before making his last appearance on 22 October 1966 in a friendly match against Belgium, which finished as a 0–1 loss.

== Managerial career ==
Hertig began his managerial career at Yverdon Sport from 1972 to 1973, before returning to Lausanne-Sport as manager in 1979. He remained coach at Lausanne until 1982, winning the Swiss Cup in 1981.

== Career statistics ==
=== International ===
Switzerland
Year	Apps	Goals
1962	1	1
1963	1	0
1964	1	0
1966	2	0
Total	5	1

=== International goals ===
No.	Date	Venue	Opponent	Score	Result	Competition
1	11 November 1962	Olympic Stadium, Amsterdam, Netherlands	Netherlands	1–1	1–3	1964 European Nations' Cup qualifying

== Honours ==
=== Player ===
Lausanne-Sport

- Nationalliga A: 1964–65
- Swiss Cup: 1961–62, 1963–64

=== Manager ===
Lausanne-Sport

- Swiss Cup: 1980–81
