= George Cummins (footballer) =

Irish footballer

Personal information
- Full name: George Patrick Cummins
- Date of birth: 12 March 1931
- Place of birth: Dublin, Ireland
- Date of death: 29 November 2009 (aged 78)
- Place of death: Southport, England
- Position: Inside forward

Senior career*
Years	Team	Apps	(Gls)
1950–1953	Everton	24	(0)
1953–1961	Luton Town	184	(21)
1961–1962	Cambridge City	21	(3)
1962–1964	Hull City	21	(2)
Total		229	(23)

International career
1953–1961	Republic of Ireland	19	(5)
- * Club domestic league appearances and goals

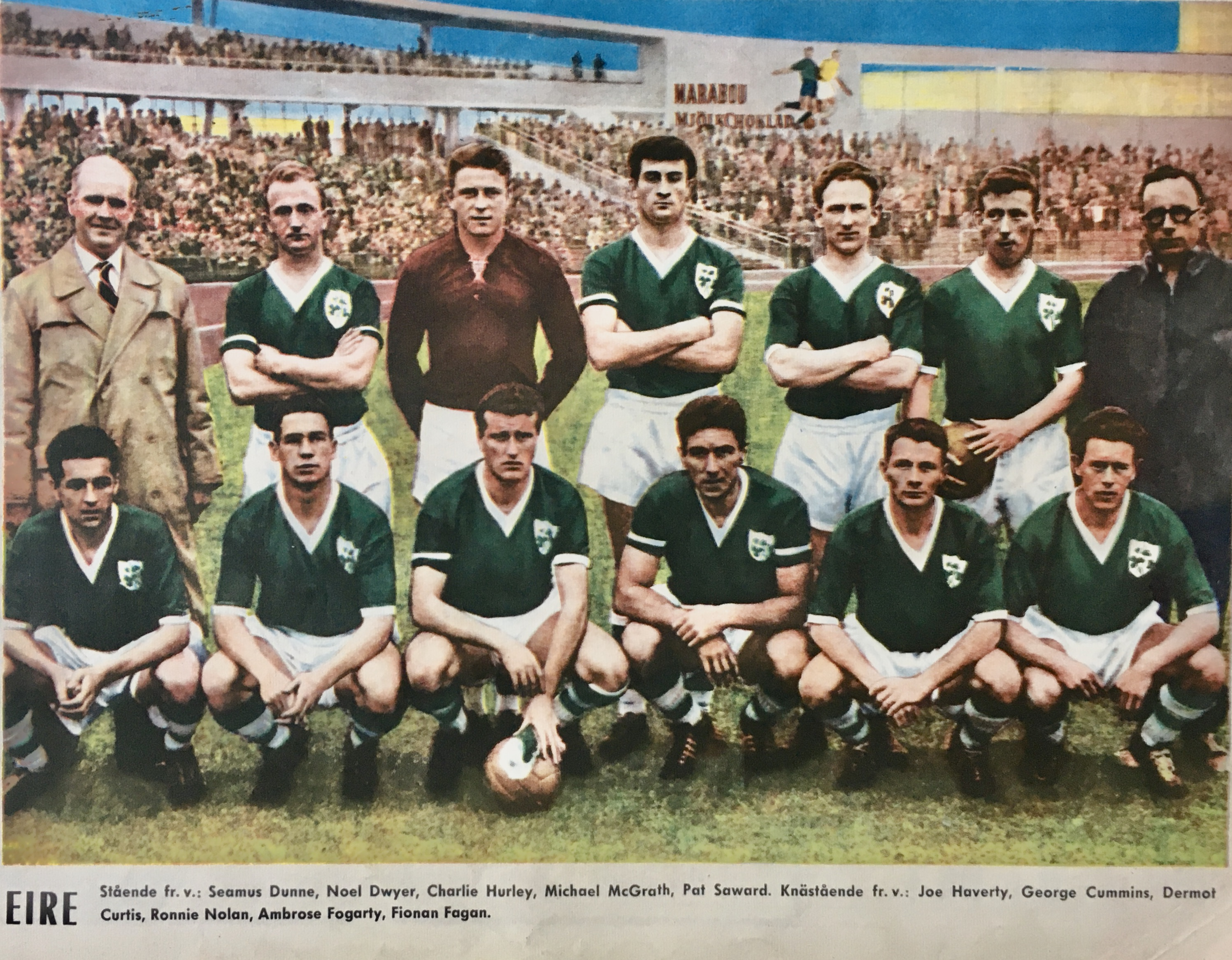
The Republic of Ireland national football team had a match in Sweden against the Sweden national team in May 1960 – players of the team from left to right, standing; Seamus Dunne, Noel Dwyer, Charlie Hurley. Michael McGrath, Pat Saward; crouched: Joe Haverty, George Cummins, Dermot Curtis, Ronnie Nolan, Ambrose "Amby" Fogarty and Fionan "Paddy" Fagan.

George Cummins (12 March 1931 – 29 November 2009) was an Irish professional footballer.

Cummins was an inside forward who played for St. Patrick's Athletic (prior to their joining the League of Ireland) before joining Everton in October 1950. He made just 24 appearances for the Merseyside club and didn't score before moving on to Luton Town in 1953. He went on to become one of Luton's best players over the next eight years, scoring 21 goals in 184 games and playing for them in the 1959 FA Cup Final.

After leaving Luton, Cummins later played for Cambridge City and Hull City.

At international level, Cummins won 19 caps for the Republic of Ireland, scoring five goals. His international debut was on 28 October 1953 in a 4–0 win over Luxembourg at Dalymount Park in a World Cup qualifier. In his second game for his country he scored the winner against the same opposition.

== Honours ==
Luton Town

- FA Cup runner-up: 1958–59
