= Noel Dwyer =

Irish footballer (1934–1992)

Personal information
- Date of birth: 30 October 1934
- Place of birth: Dublin, Ireland
- Date of death: 27 December 1992 (aged 58)
- Position: Goalkeeper

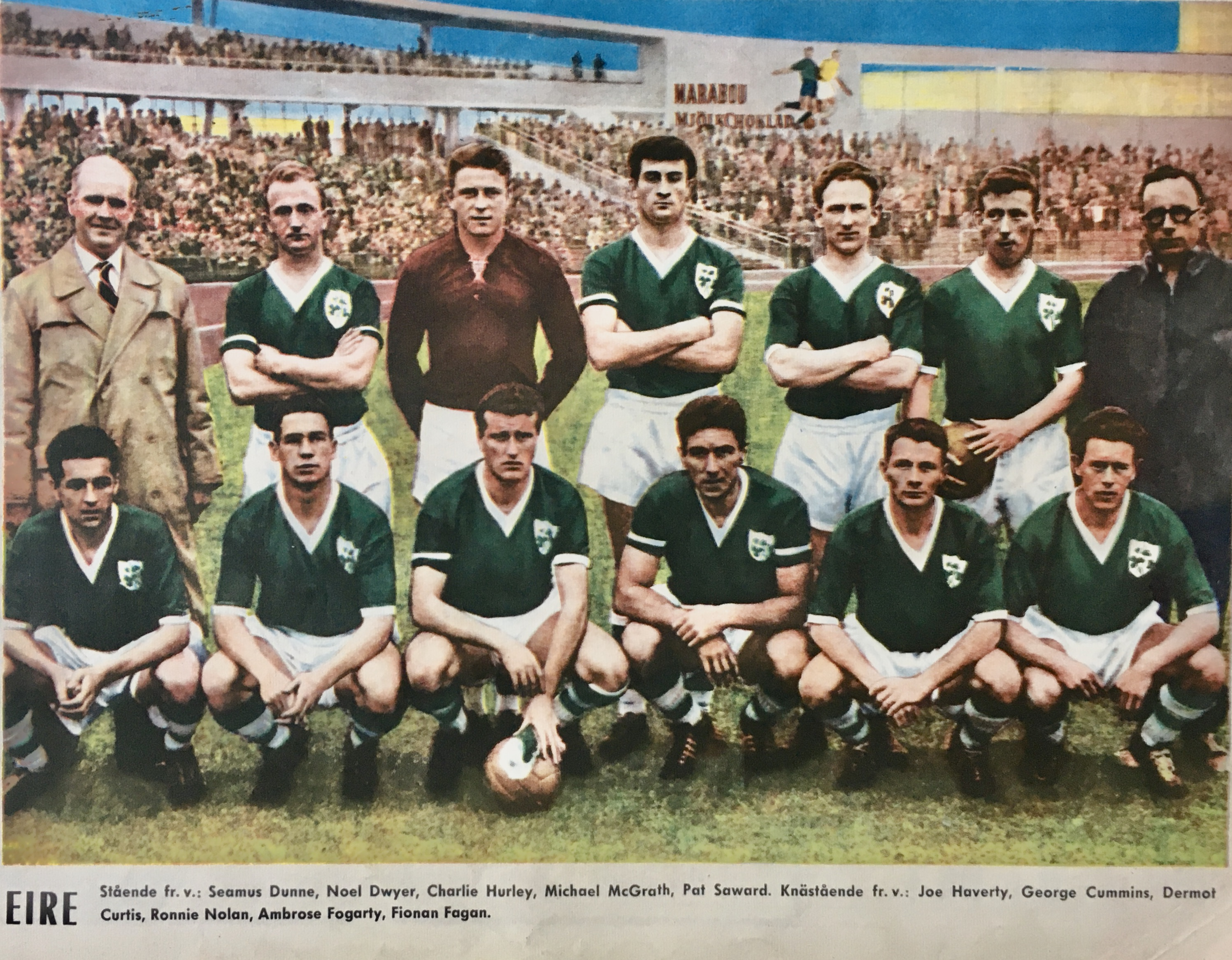
The Republic of Ireland national football team had a match in Sweden against the Sweden national team in May 1960 – players of the team from left to right, standing; Seamus Dunne, Noel Dwyer, Charlie Hurley. Michael McGrath, Pat Saward; crouched: Joe Haverty, George Cummins, Dermot Curtis, Ronnie Nolan, Ambrose "Amby" Fogarty and Fionan "Paddy" Fagan.

Noel Dwyer (30 October 1934 – 27 December 1992) was an Irish professional footballer who played as a goalkeeper.

Born in Dublin, he played his schoolboy football with Stella Maris before moving to Northern Ireland club Ormeau. He went on to play 14 times for the Republic of Ireland national team between 1959 and 1964.

He began his English club career with Wolverhampton Wanderers, where he made just five appearances in the 1957–58 season.

He then had spells at West Ham United, Swansea Town, Plymouth Argyle, and Charlton Athletic. He made a total of 213 Football League appearances in his 12-year senior career, 140 of them with Swansea.

Dwyer died in December 1992 at the age of 58. His daughter was married to the footballer Frank Worthington who died in 2021.
