= Majid Halvaei =

Iranian footballer

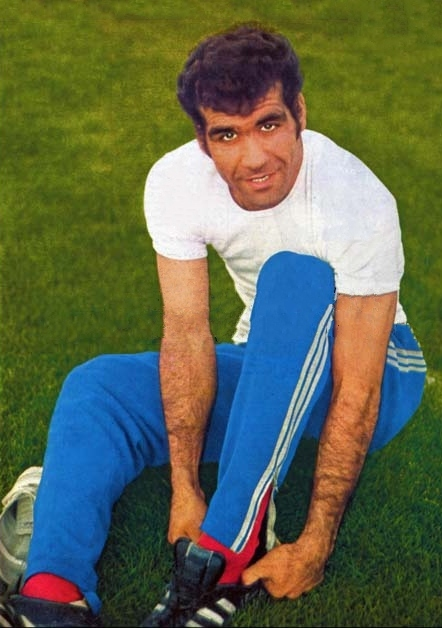

Personal information
- Date of birth: 7 February 1948 (age 78)
- Place of birth: Ahvaz, Iran
- Height: 1.76 m (5 ft 9 in)
- Position: Defender

Senior career*
Years	Team	Apps	(Gls)
1969–1970	Paykan		
1970–1978	Pas Tehran		

International career
1970–1974	Iran	15	(2)
- * Club domestic league appearances and goals

Majid Halvaei (Persian: مجید حلوایی, born 7 February 1948) is a retired Iranian association football defender. Between 1970 and 1974 he played 15 international matches, at the 1970 Asian Games, 1972 Summer Olympics and 1972 AFC Asian Cup, which Iran won. Domestically he mostly stayed with PAS Tehran F.C.

He scored 2 international goals during his career. His first national goal was against Chile in Brazil Independence Cup. His second goal was against Brazil in 1972 Summer Olympics which was the only goal of the match and secured Iran's victory over Brazil.
