= 1974 FIFA World Cup qualification – UEFA Group 9 =

Group 9 consisted of three of the 32 teams entered into the European zone: France, Republic of Ireland, and Soviet Union. These three teams competed on a home-and-away basis with the group's winner advancing to the UEFA–CONMEBOL play-off with the winner of the play-off earning a place in the final tournament.

== Standings ==
Rank	Team	Pld	W	D	L	GF	GA	GD	Pts
1	Soviet Union	4	3	0	1	5	2	+3	6
2	Republic of Ireland	4	1	1	2	4	5	−1	3
3	France	4	1	1	2	3	5	−2	3

== Matches ==
13 October 1972

France	1–0	Soviet Union
Bereta 61'	Report

Parc des Princes, Paris, France
Attendance: 29,746
Referee: Scheurer (Switzerland)

18 October 1972

Republic of Ireland	1–2	Soviet Union
Conroy 83'	Report	Fedotov 55'; Kolotov 65'

Lansdowne Road, Dublin, Ireland
Attendance: 27,656
Referee: Øberg (Norway)

15 November 1972

Republic of Ireland	2–1	France
Conroy 27'; Treacy 77'	Report	Larqué 66'

Dalymount Park, Dublin, Ireland
Attendance: 26,511
Referee: Rasmussen (Denmark)

13 May 1973

Soviet Union	1–0	Republic of Ireland
Onyshchenko 58'	Report

Lenin Central Stadium, Moscow, Soviet Union
Attendance: 65,527
Referee: Dahlberg (Sweden)

19 May 1973

France	1–1	Republic of Ireland
Chiesa 78'	Report	Martin 83'

Parc des Princes, Paris, France
Attendance: 28,405
Referee: Rainea (Romania)

26 May 1973

Soviet Union	2–0	France
Blokhin 81'; Onyshchenko 84'	Report

Lenin Central Stadium, Moscow, Soviet Union
Attendance: 76,604
Referee: Biwersi (West Germany)
