= Dermot Curtis =

Irish footballer

Personal information
- Full name: Dermot Patrick Curtis
- Date of birth: 26 August 1932
- Place of birth: Dublin, Ireland
- Date of death: 1 November 2008 (aged 76)
- Place of death: Exeter, England
- Position: Forward

Senior career*
Years	Team	Apps	(Gls)
1952–1956	Shelbourne	?	(26)
1956–1958	Bristol City	26	(16)
1958–1963	Ipswich Town	41	(17)
1963–1966	Exeter City	91	(23)
1966–1967	Torquay United	12	(1)
1967–1969	Exeter City	66	(10)
- Bideford
Total		236	(93)

International career
1956–1963	Republic of Ireland	17	(8)
1956–1957	League of Ireland XI	2	(1)
- * Club domestic league appearances and goals

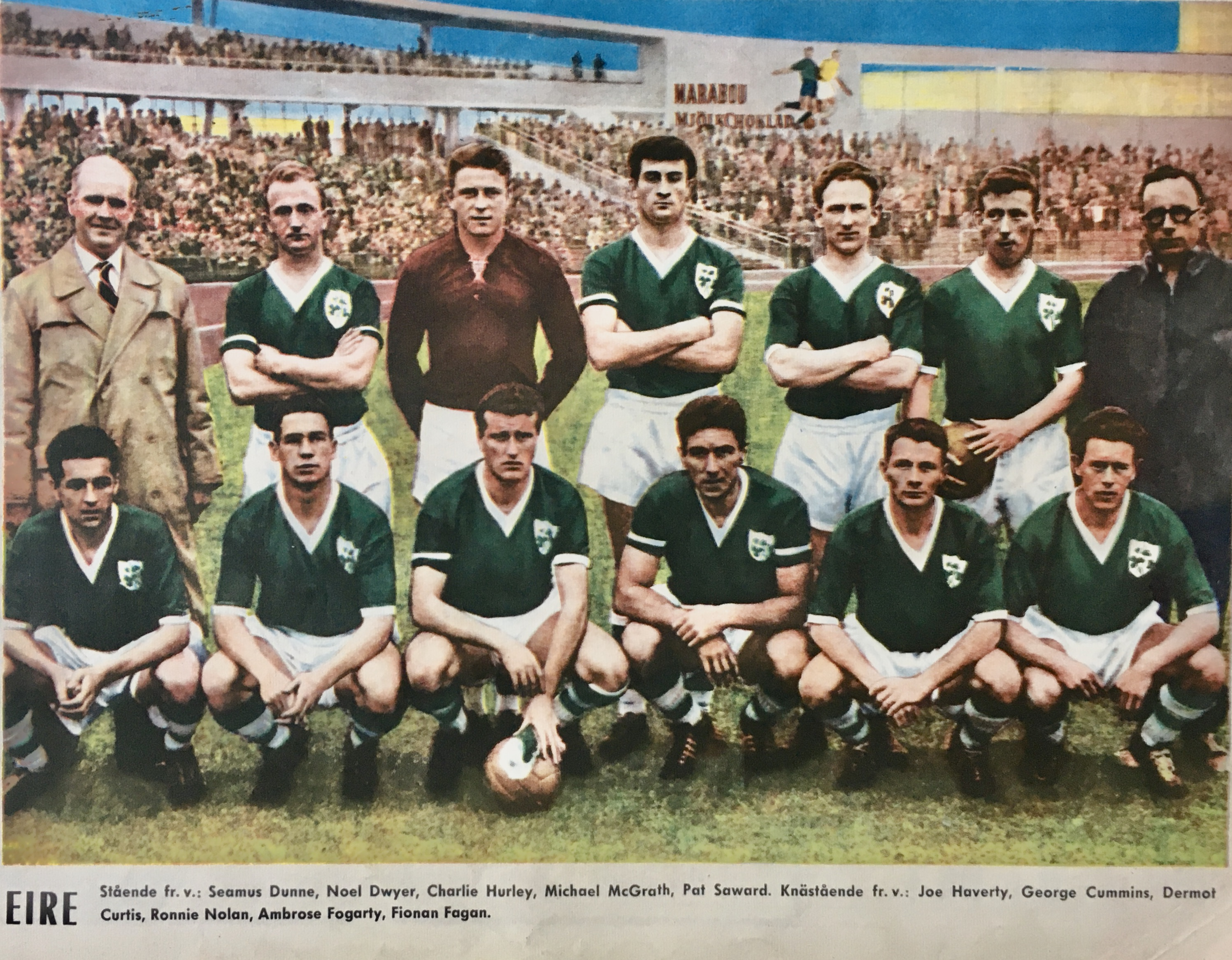
The Republic of Ireland national football team had a match in Sweden against the Sweden national team in May 1960 – players of the team from left to right, standing; Seamus Dunne, Noel Dwyer, Charlie Hurley. Michael McGrath, Pat Saward; crouched: Joe Haverty, George Cummins, Dermot Curtis, Ronnie Nolan, Ambrose "Amby" Fogarty and Fionan "Paddy" Fagan.

Dermot Curtis (26 August 1932 – 1 November 2008) was an Irish international footballer. He represented his country 17 times, playing at centre-forward.

Curtis was playing in the League of Ireland for Shelbourne when he first hit the headlines. On 19 September, at Dalymount Park the League of Ireland XI held a star-studded English League XI to a 3–3 draw with Curtis notching the vital third goal.

He made his full international debut for Republic of Ireland at home to Denmark on 3 October 1956 in which he scored. In December that year he joined Bristol City for £8,000 where he was to score 16 league goals in only 26 games. In September 1958 he joined Ipswich Town, playing in the side that won promotion to Division One in 1961, and the league championship the following season. However, the form of Ray Crawford and Ted Phillips limited his chances at Portman Road, and in August 1963 he moved to Exeter City after only 41 league games (in which he scored 17 times).

On 23 September 1963 he became the first Exeter player to be capped for his country as he earned his 17th and final international cap in a 0–0 draw with Austria in Vienna. After 91 league appearances (in which he scored 23 goals), Curtis moved to Torquay United, signing in August 1966. However, his move to Plainmoor was not a great success as in his only season he made just 12 league appearances, scoring just a single goal. In June 1967 he returned to Exeter City, where his league career was to end after a further 66 league appearances in which he scored 10 goals. He later played non-league football for Bideford.

Curtis died in Exeter on 1 November 2008, after a long illness.

== Honours ==
- League of Ireland
  - Shelbourne 1952–53
- Football League Second Division
  - Ipswich Town F.C. 1960–61
- Football League First Division
  - Ipswich Town F.C. 1961–62
