= Vladimír Hagara =

Slovak footballer

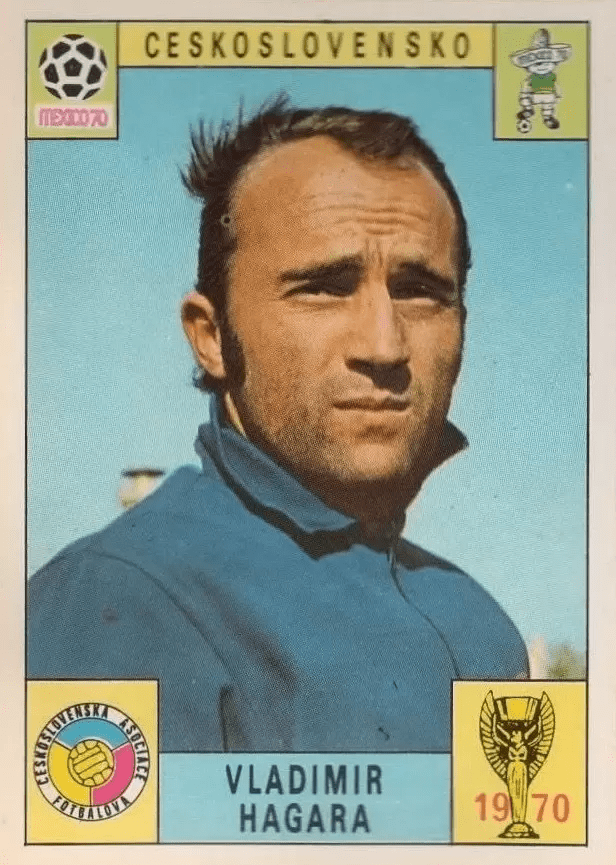
- Hagara at the 1970 FIFA World Cup

Personal information
- Full name: Vladimír Hagara
- Date of birth: 7 November 1943
- Place of birth: Piešťany, Czechoslovakia
- Date of death: 24 May 2015 (aged 71)
- Position: Left back

Youth career
- 1955–1958: Piešťany
- 1958–1961: Spartak Stará Turá

Senior career*
Years	Team	Apps	(Gls)
1961–1964	TJ Gottwaldov		
1964–1966	Nitra		
1966–1974	Spartak Trnava	226	(6)
1974–1977	Strojárne Martin		
1977–1978	Piešťany		

International career
1968–1973	Czechoslovakia	25	(4)
- * Club domestic league appearances and goals

Vladimír Hagara (7 November 1943 – 24 May 2015) was a former Slovak football player. He played for Czechoslovakia national team in 25 matches and scored four goals.

He was a participant at the 1970 FIFA World Cup, where he played in two matches.

Hagara played mostly for Spartak Trnava. At the end of his career played for ZTS Martin.

On 24 May 2015, Hagara was reported dead at the age of 71.
