= Joe Haverty =

Irish footballer (1936–2009)

Personal information
- Full name: Joseph Haverty
- Date of birth: 17 February 1936
- Place of birth: Dublin, Ireland
- Date of death: 7 February 2009 (aged 72)
- Place of death: Dublin, Ireland
- Height: 5 ft 3 in (1.60 m)
- Position: Winger

Youth career
- Home Farm

Senior career*
Years	Team	Apps	(Gls)
1953–1954	St Patrick's Athletic	9	(1)
1954–1961	Arsenal	114	(25)
1961–1962	Blackburn Rovers	27	(1)
1962–1964	Millwall	68	(8)
1964	→ Celtic (loan)	1	(0)
1964–1965	Bristol Rovers	13	(1)
1965–1966	Shelbourne	26	(3)
1967	Chicago Spurs	16	(0)
1968	Kansas City Spurs	22	(1)
1969	→ Drumcondra (loan)	6	(0)
1969–1971	Shamrock Rovers	7	(0)
1971–1972	Drogheda	6	(0)

International career
1955–1966	Republic of Ireland	32	(3)
- * Club domestic league appearances and goals

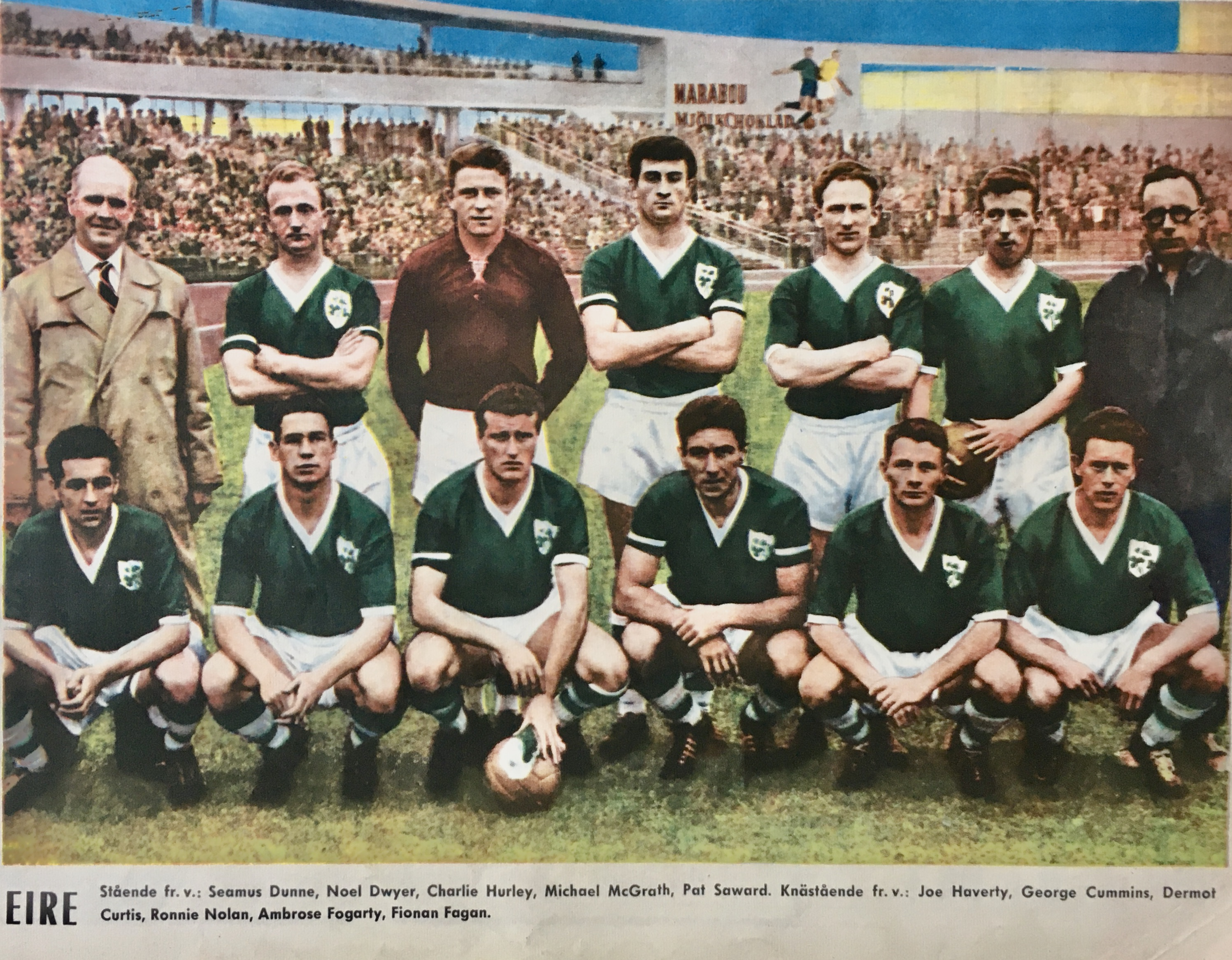
The Republic of Ireland national football team before their away match against Sweden in May 1960. Players (L–R), standing: Seamus Dunne, Noel Dwyer, Charlie Hurley. Michael McGrath, Pat Saward; crouched: Joe Haverty, George Cummins, Dermot Curtis, Ronnie Nolan, Ambrose "Amby" Fogarty and Fionan "Paddy" Fagan.

Joseph Haverty (17 February 1936 – 7 February 2009) was an Irish footballer who played as a winger. He was capped 32 times for the Republic of Ireland.

== Career ==
Haverty played for Home Farm and St Patrick's Athletic before signing for Arsenal in July 1954. He almost immediately made his debut, while still only 18, against Everton on 25 August 1954, though he only managed another six matches that season, and eight the one after that.

His breakthrough in the Arsenal side came in 1956–57, as he became the Gunners' first choice left-winger, playing 32 times and scoring 9 goals. By now he had also made his debut for the Republic of Ireland, against the Netherlands on 10 May 1955.

Haverty also played in the London XI that contested the inaugural edition of the Inter-Cities Fairs Cup. He played against Lausanne Sports in the semi-finals (and scored a goal in the 3–2 aggregate win), he did not make the cut for the final against Barcelona, which London lost 6–1 on aggregate.

Back trouble meant he missed some of Arsenal's matches during this time, but put in 37 appearances and 8 goals in 1959–60, his best season for the club. However, the next season he was made to share the left wing position with Alan Skirton. Haverty was unhappy with the lack of a regular first-team place, and put in a transfer request; he was sold to Blackburn Rovers in August 1961 for £25,000. In all, he played 122 matches for Arsenal, scoring 26 goals.

Haverty spent a single season with Blackburn, before having spells in the lower divisions with Millwall and Bristol Rovers, with a brief spell at Celtic in between. He moved back to his native Ireland to play for Shelbourne, with whom he won the last of his 32 full international caps. In 1967 he went to the United States to play for Chicago Spurs (later Kansas City Spurs) in the NASL, and then returned to sign for Shamrock Rovers in 1969, for whom he made two appearances in the European Cup Winners' Cup. In August 1971 he signed for Drogheda.

He went on to scout for Arsenal in Ireland. In 2000, he was inaugurated into the Football Association of Ireland's Hall of Fame. He died on 7 February 2009, in Dublin, aged 72.

== Honours ==
- Football Association of Ireland Hall of Fame: 2000
