= Jaime Rimazza =

Bolivian footballer (born 1946)

Personal information
- Full name: Jaime Rimazza Vargas
- Date of birth: 12 December 1946 (age 79)
- Place of birth: Cochabamba, Bolivia
- Position: Midfielder

International career
Years	Team	Apps	(Gls)
1975–1977	Bolivia	3	(0)

Jaime Rimazza (born 12 December 1946) is a Bolivian footballer. He played in three matches for the Bolivia national football team from 1975 to 1977. He was also part of Bolivia's squad for the 1975 Copa América tournament.
