= Andrej Kvašňák =

Slovak footballer

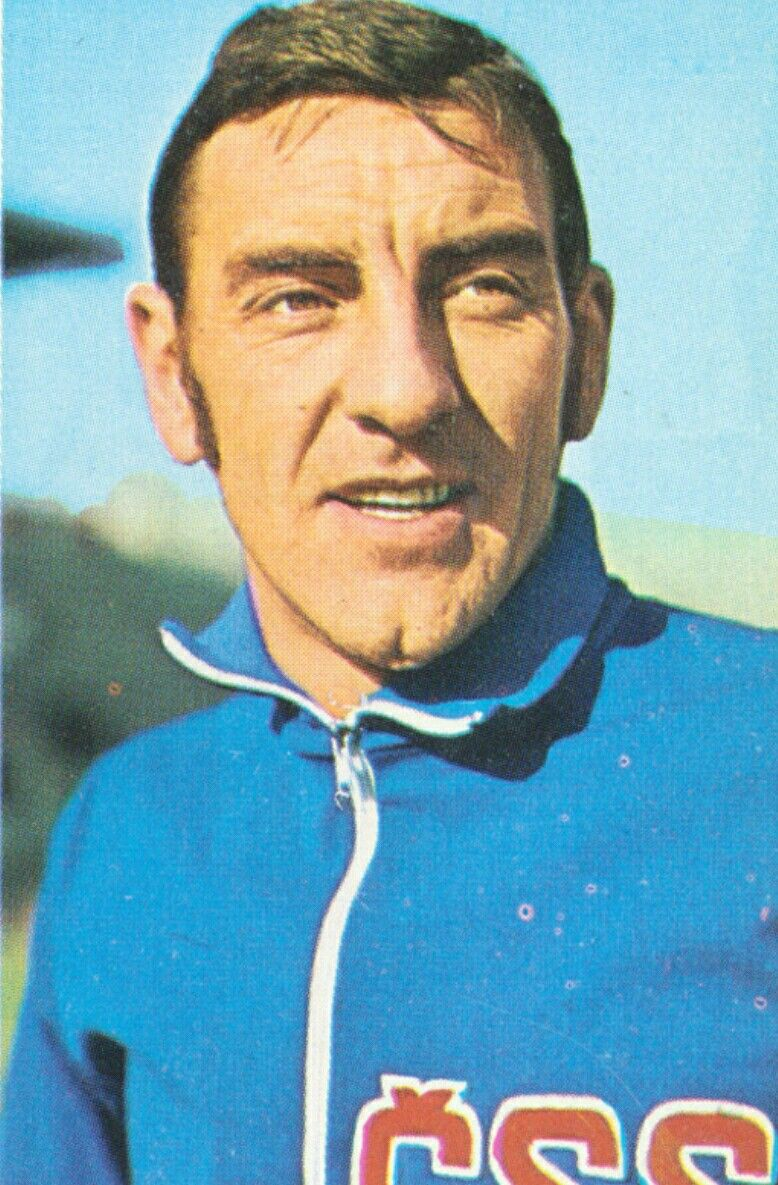
- Kvašňák at the 1970 FIFA World Cup

Personal information
- Date of birth: 19 May 1936
- Place of birth: Košice, Czechoslovakia
- Date of death: 18 April 2007 (aged 70)
- Place of death: Prague, Czech Republic
- Positions: Attacking midfielder; forward

Youth career
- 1947–1951: OŠPZ Košice
- 1951–1956: VSS Košice

Senior career*
| Years | Team | Apps | (Gls) |
| 1956–1958 | Dukla Pardubice | | |
| 1958–1959 | Jednota Košice | | |
| 1959–1969 | Sparta Prague | 202 | (65) |
| 1969–1972 | K.R.C. Mechelen | 58 | (17) |
| 1972–1973 | Viktoria Žižkov | | |
| 1973–1976 | TJ Sklostroj Turnov | | |
| 1976–1978 | Tatran Zličín (player-coach) | | |

International career
| 1956–1959 | Czechoslovakia B | 9 | (1) |
| 1960–1970 | Czechoslovakia | 47 | (13) |
Medal record
Men's football
Representing Czechoslovakia
FIFA World Cup
| Runner-up | 1962 Chile |
- * Club domestic league appearances and goals

Andrej Kvašňák (19 May 1936 – 18 April 2007) was a Slovak football player. Born in Košice, he played for Czechoslovakia, for which he played 47 matches and scored 13 goals. He is usually considered one of the best Czechoslovak footballers.

== Club career ==
Kvašňák played domestically in the Czechoslovak First League for Dukla Pardubice, Jednota Košice and Sparta Prague. He scored a total of 83 goals in the league in 251 appearances across his spells with all clubs, and won two league titles, both with Sparta. From 1969 he played for Racing Mechelen in the second tier of Belgium, before leaving in 1972.

== International career ==
Before breaking into the senior team, Kvašňák played nine matches, scoring once, for Czechoslovakia B between 1956 and 1959. He made 47 appearances for Czechoslovakia between 1960 and 1970, scoring 13 times. One of his goals was a penalty against Hungary in a qualifying playoff for the 1970 World Cup. Kvašňák was a participant in the 1960 European Nations' Cup, where Czechoslovakia finished third, the 1962 FIFA World Cup, where Czechoslovakia finished second, and also in the 1970 FIFA World Cup. He retired from international football following the 1970 World Cup, at the age of 34.

== Style of play ==
Although often listed as a forward, he was an attacking left footed midfield schemer with accurate final passes, forging a partnership in the centre of the park with Josef Masopust at the international level. Well known for his technique and passing ability, he was also a prolific goalscorer, who was hard to defend, and fine header of the ball. Although he wasn’t a speed player, he was always one step ahead of his opponents. One Czechoslovak journalist wrote about Kvašňák, that he is the slowest footballer who’s always first to the ball. Argentine Newspaper La Nación wrote about Kvašňák’s play on the FIFA World 1962 in Chile, that he „didn’t run, just walk. But he was everywhere.“ Thanks to his persona, he was also known as a great and popular showman on the pitch. In a certain term of a word, Kvašňák was some kind of first football celebrity in Czechoslovakia.

He was nicknamed as Šéf (translation from Czech would be the Boss), because of his playmaking abilities, football intelligence, natural leadership and authority. Polish manager Wladyslaw Giergiel compared Kvašňák’s influence on the team’s play to the legendary Alfredo Di Stéfano or Hungarian football icon Nándor Hidekguti.

== Later life and death ==
Kvašňák settled in Prague after his football career, but did not go into coaching. Instead he was a longstanding employee of the Prague Public Transit Company. He was one of the founders of the New Year’s derby, the very popular exhibition match between mainly former footballers of two most famous and successful czech clubs AC Sparta Prague and SK Slavia Prague. The match has always been held on 31 December since 1986. The first matches were held at Čechie Karlín Stadium, because Kvašňák's flat was nearby.

Kvašňák died at age 70 in Prague's Bulovka Hospital after contracting lung cancer.

== Honours ==
AC Sparta Prague

- Mitropa Cup: 1964
- Czechoslovak First league: 1964-1965, 1966-1967
- Czechoslovak First league 2nd Place: 1965-1966
- Czechoslovak First league 3rd Place: 1968-1969
- Czechoslovak Cup: 1963-1964
- II Torneo Hexagonal de Futbol 2nd Place: 1966
- Copa Montevideio 1969 2nd Place

Czechoslovakia

- FIFA World Cup runner-up: 1962
- UEFA European Championship 3rd Place: 1960

Individual

- Ballon d'Or: 1962 - 15th, 1965 - 17th, 1967 - 18 th
- Czechoslovak sportsperson of the Year: 1965 - 5th
- Mladá Fronta International Players Poll for the Best Czechoslovak Player: 1965
- II Torneo Hexagonal de Futbol 1966: Best Player of the Tournament
- Copa Montevideio 1969: Best Player of the Tournament
- Czech Footballer of the Century by the magazine Gól Poll in 2000: 9th Place
- Slovak footballer of the Century by the magazine Pravda Poll in 2000: 7th Place
- Spartan of the Century (The most Popular Sparta Prague player): 2001
- AC Sparta Prague Hall of Fame: 2006
- Football Association of the Czech Republic Hall of Fame: 2007
- Czechoslovak Footballer of the Century by the Mladá Fronta Poll in 2009: 9th Place
- Football Association of the Czech Republic Hall of Fame as a member of Czechoslovak FIFA World Cup 1962 Team: 2010
- The main stand of the Letná stadium, home Venue of Sparta Prague, is named after Andrej Kvašňák: 2013
- Slovak Football Hall of Fame: 2018
- FK Košice created a Third Kit for the 2026-2027 Season in honour to Andrej Kvašňák, who was born in Košice: 2026
- Sparta Prague Plejer Club as a tribute to the best players who have been loyal to the club and spread the good name of Sparta even beyond the borders of Czech country
