= Cristóbal Maldonado =

Paraguayan footballer (1950–2019)

Personal information
- Date of birth: 12 October 1950
- Date of death: 20 October 2019 (aged 69)
- Position: Forward

International career
Years	Team	Apps	(Gls)
1975	Paraguay	2	(0)

Cristóbal Maldonado (12 October 1950 – 20 October 2019) was a Paraguayan footballer. He played in two matches for the Paraguay national football team in 1975. He was also part of Paraguay's squad for the 1975 Copa América tournament.
