= Zoltán Halmosi =

Hungarian footballer (1947–2025)

- Halmosi in the 1970 FIFA World qualifiers

Personal information
- Full name: Zoltán Halmosi
- Date of birth: July 28, 1947
- Place of birth: Bozzai, Vas, Hungary
- Date of death: January 4, 2025 (aged 77)
- Place of death: Szombathely, Vas, Hungary
- Position: Midfielder

Youth career
- 1963–1967: Haladás

Senior career*
Years	Team	Apps	(Gls)
1965–1981	Haladás	306	(19)

International career
1969–1974	Hungary	11	(1)
- * Club domestic league appearances and goals

Zoltán Halmosi (28 July 1947 – 4 January 2025) was a Hungarian footballer. He played as midfielder for Haladás in his entire professional career, achieving runners-up in the 1974–75 Magyar Kupa. He also represented Hungary internationally, playing in the 1970 FIFA World qualifiers. He is also the father of Hungarian international Péter Halmosi.

== Club career ==
Halmosi was born to a modest family until he lost his father at an early age. From 1961, he had studied to become a welder at Szombathely but would find immense success in the world of football as he would be accepted in the youth ranks of Haladás at the age of 16. He later make his senior debut on June 20, 1965, in a match against VT Vasas before later making his debut in the 1967 Nemzeti Bajnokság I. He was later briefly suspended in the summer of 1972 for three years after kicking the sidline marker in the rear. He went on to make 306 appearances and score 19 goals from 1967 to 1981. He would also discover the talents of József Nagy and designate him as his successor. Following this, he played in amateur football as a player-coach for several clubs in Austria from 1982 to 1989 including Oberwart, Rechnitz, Zuberbach and Pinkafeld.

== International career ==
Between 1969 and 1974, he represented Hungary on 11 occasions. Most of his appearances were friendlies however he participated in the 1970 FIFA World qualifiers as well as the UEFA Euro 1976 qualifiers, during which he would score a goal against Ireland in the former on 5 November 1969 in a 4–0 victory as Hungary would narrowly avoid qualification for the tournament.

== Personal life ==
Halmosi later married Hungarian international cross-country runner Rozália Séfer and later had two children with her: Zoltán Halmosi Jr. and Péter Halmosi. His sons later became footballers after their Zoltán had suggested the career for them, giving the two advice on how to play until his death with all three making the Magyar Kupa final with Haladás throughout their careers. He was described by Péter as being pure-hearted, honest and modest due to how his mother had raised him. He was also a popular figure within Szombathely as his reputation and charisma would be a source of prestige for his family as he would become an idol of Haladás due to his career. On Teacher's Day 1997, he received the title of Honorary Member of Hungarian Sports from the OTSH as a member of the youth committee of the Vas County Football Association for his career both as a player and as a player-coach. Halmosi died on 4 January 2025 at the age of 77 after suffering from an undisclosed illness.
