= Seamus Dunne =

Irish footballer

Personal information
- Full name: Seamus Dunne
- Date of birth: 13 April 1930
- Place of birth: Wicklow, Ireland
- Date of death: 28 September 2016 (aged 86)
- Position: Defender

Youth career
- Shelbourne

Senior career*
Years	Team	Apps	(Gls)
1947–1948	Drogheda	?	(?)
1948–1949	Wicklow Town	?	(?)
1949–1950	Shelbourne	?	(0)
1950–1961	Luton Town	301	(0)
1961–1964	Yiewsley		
1964–1970	Dunstable Town		

International career
1952–1960	Ireland	15	(0)

Managerial career
- 1964–1970: Dunstable Town
- * Club domestic league appearances and goals

Seamus Dunne (13 April 1930 – 28 September 2016) was an Irish professional footballer from Wicklow, best known as a player for English side Luton Town.

== Playing career ==
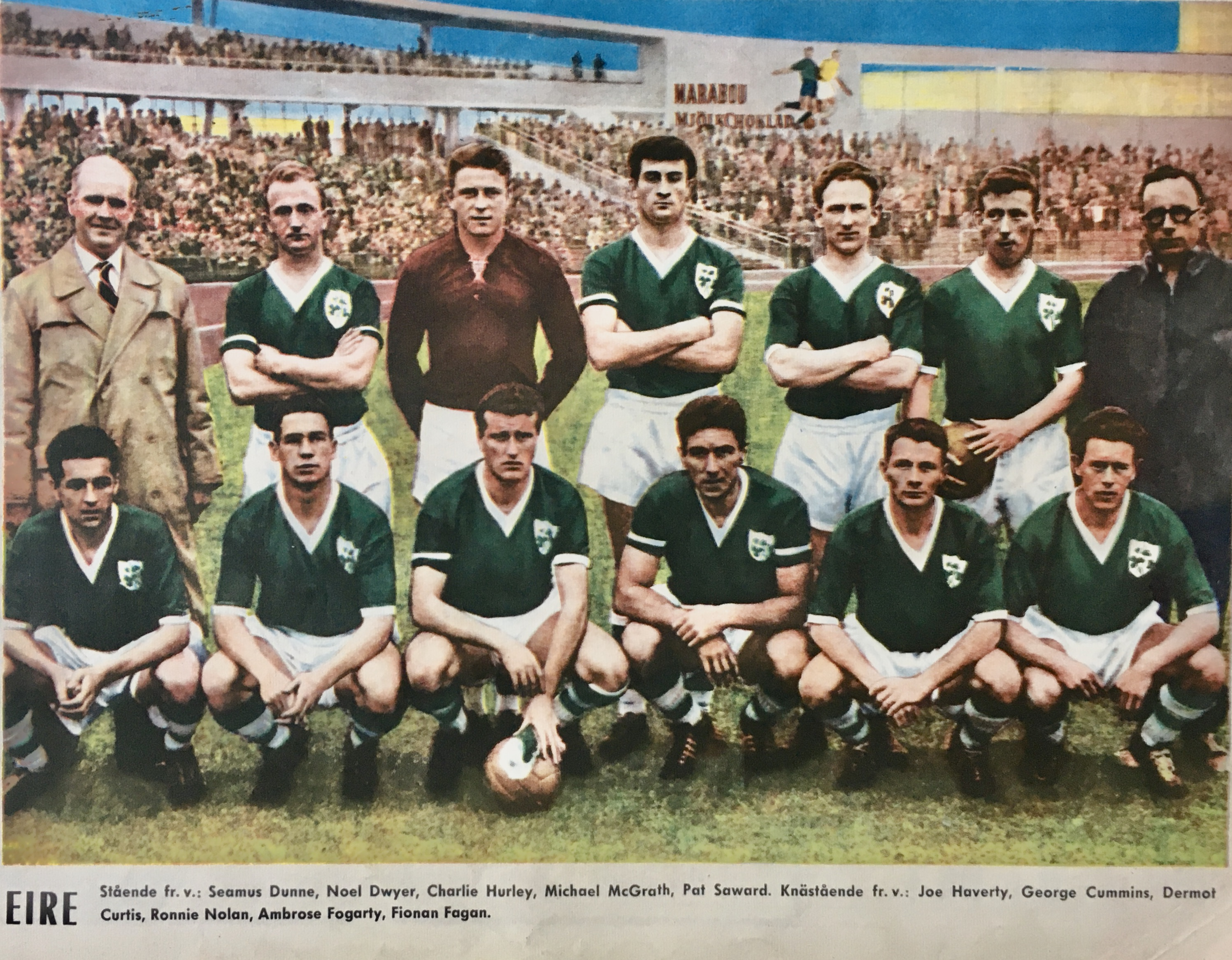
The Republic of Ireland national football team had a match in Sweden against the Sweden national team in May 1960 – players of the team from left to right, standing; Seamus Dunne, Noel Dwyer, Charlie Hurley. Michael McGrath, Pat Saward; crouched: Joe Haverty, George Cummins, Dermot Curtis, Ronnie Nolan, Ambrose "Amby" Fogarty and Fionan "Paddy" Fagan.

Dunne joined Luton Town from Shelbourne in July 1950 and made his debut for Luton on 26 December 1951 in a 6–1 victory over West Ham United at Kenilworth Road. During the next ten years he was a regular at right back for Luton as they won promotion to Division One in 1955 and reached the 1959 FA Cup Final.

Dunne made his debut for Ireland against France in 1953, and also played against Austria during the same year. The 1960–61 season was Dunne's last at Luton; he was transferred to Yiewsley, where he played for three years. He was then player-manager at Dunstable Town while working at the Vauxhall Motors plant in Luton.

After leaving Dunstable in 1970, Dunne returned to his native Ireland. In later life he lived in retirement in Bray. He died at the age of 86 on 28 September 2016.
