= Paddy Fagan =

Irish footballer

Personal information
- Full name: Fionan Richard Fagan
- Date of birth: 7 June 1930
- Place of birth: Dublin, Ireland
- Date of death: 19 November 2014 (aged 84)
- Place of death: Manchester, England
- Position: Right winger

Senior career*
| Years | Team | Apps | (Gls) |
| 1949–1951 | Transport | ? | (2) |
| 1951–1953 | Hull City | 26 | (2) |
| 1953–1960 | Manchester City | 165 | (35) |
| 1960–1961 | Derby County | 24 | (6) |
| 1961–1962 | Altrincham | 32 | (15) |
| 1962–1963 | Northwich Victoria | | |
| 1963–1964 | Mossley | 3 | (0) |
| 1964–1966 | Ashton United | | |
| Total | | 237 | (60) |

International career
| 1957 | Republic of Ireland B | 1 | (0) |
| 1954–1961 | Republic of Ireland | 8 | (5) |
- * Club domestic league appearances and goals

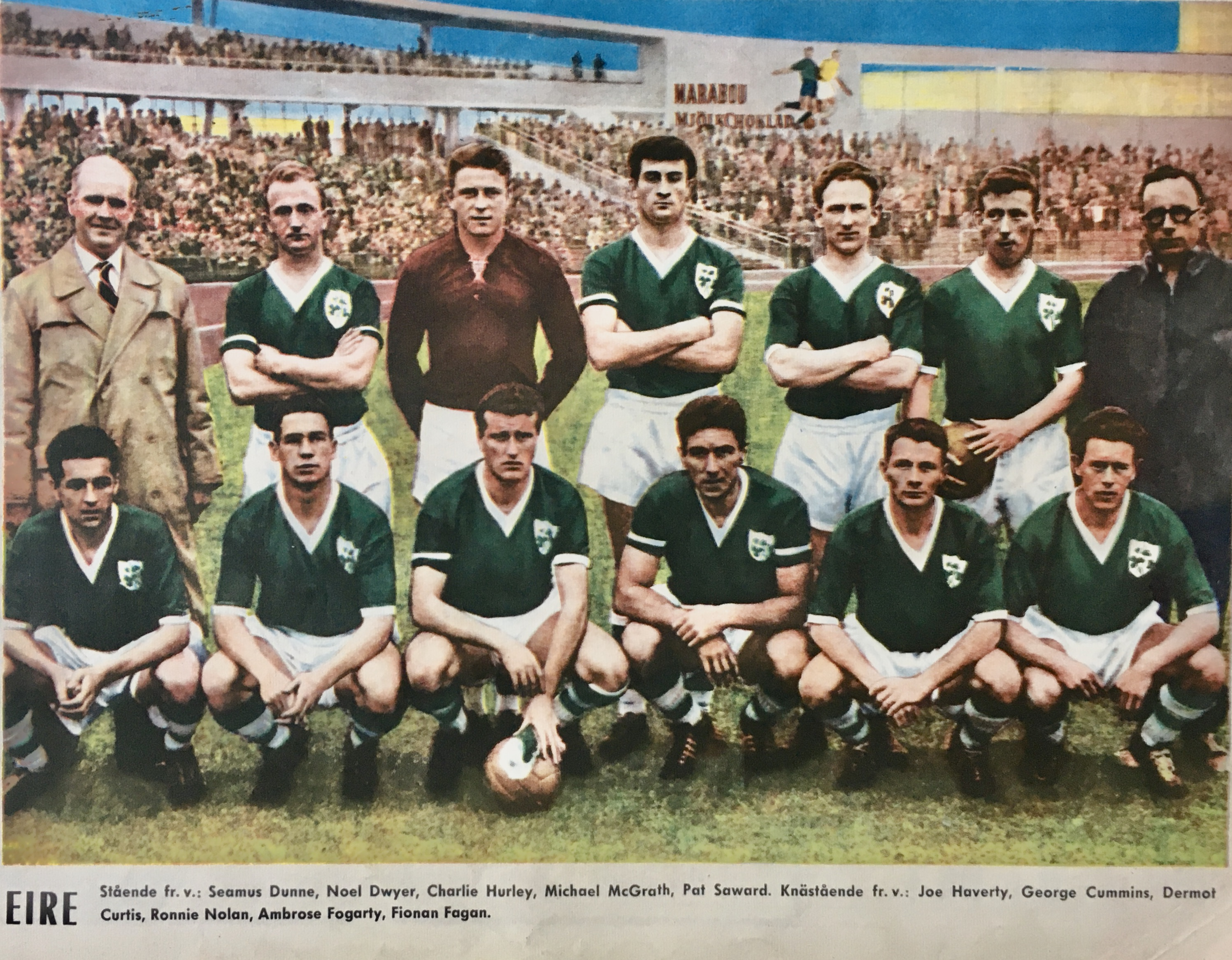
The Republic of Ireland national football team had an away match against the Sweden national team in May 1960 – players of the team from left to right, standing; Seamus Dunne, Noel Dwyer, Charlie Hurley. Michael McGrath, Pat Saward; crouched: Joe Haverty, George Cummins, Dermot Curtis, Ronnie Nolan, Ambrose "Amby" Fogarty and Fionan "Paddy" Fagan.

Fionan "Paddy" Fagan (7 June 1930 – 19 November 2014) was an Irish footballer who played as a winger.

The son of Irish international and Shamrock Rovers outside-left John Fagan, Fionan Fagan started his career with Shamrock Rovers schoolboys and then Transport F.C., before signing for English Second Division club Hull City after Raich Carter brought him to England. He played 26 times for Hull, scoring 2 goals. He signed for First Division Manchester City on Christmas Eve 1953 for £15,000, playing a reserve game on Christmas Day and making his first team debut on St Stephen's Day, a 2–1 win against Sheffield United at Maine Road.

In his first season at Manchester City Fagan made only seven appearances, but in the 1954-55 season he became a first team regular, playing under the tactical system known as the Revie Plan. The 1954–55 season proved to be Fagan's most successful for Manchester City, playing 42 times and scoring 11 goals, including two goals against Manchester United at Old Trafford, as City reached the 1955 FA Cup final. However, his Wembley appearance ended in a 3–1 defeat to Newcastle United. Manchester City reached the final again the following season, but Fagan did not play in the final, and missed out on a winners' medal. After continuing to play regularly for a further three seasons, Fagan lost his first team place to Colin Barlow in the 1959-60 season, and was transferred to Derby County for £8,000 in March 1960, after a total of 165 appearances and 35 goals for the Manchester club. Fagan was capped twice by the Irish national team while at City. The first of these international caps came on 7 November 1954 against Norway.

Fagan's played for Derby 24 times, scoring six goals, and while at Derby made a further six international appearances, in which he scored five goals. He subsequently played for a number of non-league clubs, including Northwich Victoria, Ashton United and Altrincham, where he was player manager. After a knee ligament injury forced him to retire from football he became a driving instructor, and was a founder of the Manchester City Former Players Association in the early 1990s.

== Honours ==
Manchester City

- FA Cup runner-up: 1954–55
