= Mick Martin =

Irish footballer

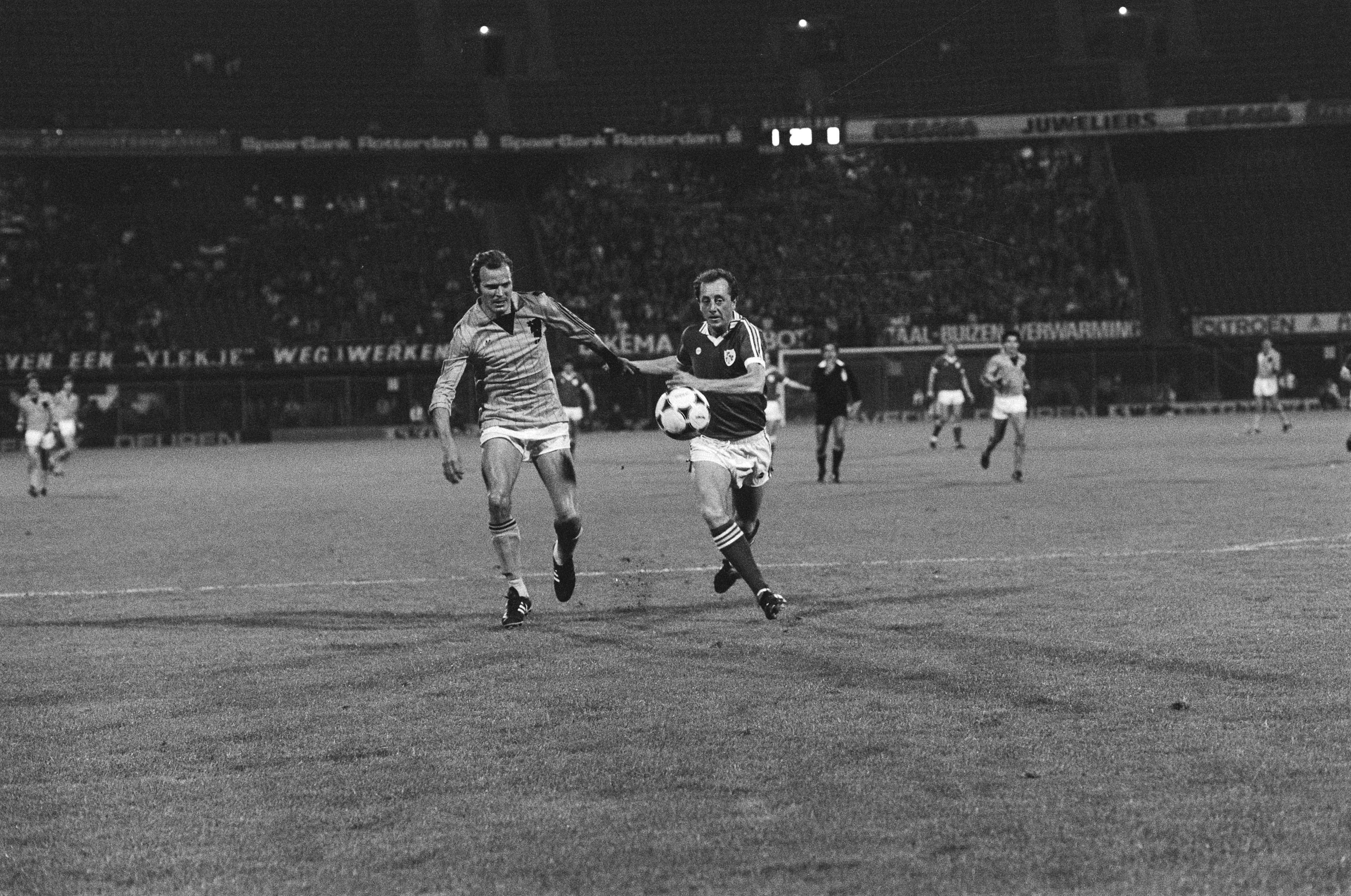
- Martin (right) playing for the Republic of Ireland in 1982

Personal information
- Full name: Michael Paul Martin
- Date of birth: 9 July 1951 (age 75)
- Place of birth: Dublin, Ireland
- Position: Midfielder

Senior career*
Years	Team	Apps	(Gls)
1968–1973	Bohemians		
1973–1975	Manchester United	40	(2)
1975–1978	West Bromwich Albion	89	(11)
1978–1984	Newcastle United	147	(5)
1984	Vancouver Whitecaps	2	(0)
1984	Willington		
1984–1985	Cardiff City	7	(0)
1985	Peterborough United	13	(0)
1985	Rotherham United	5	(0)
1985–1987	Preston North End	35	(0)
Total		338	(18)

International career
1971–1983	Republic of Ireland	52	(4)
- * Club domestic league appearances and goals

Michael Paul Martin (born 9 July 1951) is an Irish former professional footballer who played as a midfielder. He is best known for his time at Manchester United, West Bromwich Albion and Newcastle United. He also represented the Republic of Ireland from 1971 to 1983.

== Career ==
A devoted Aston Villa supporter, he played his schoolboy football mainly at Home Farm before signing for Seán Thomas' Bohemians in 1968. He spent a year learning his trade in the youth team and "B" team before progressing to the first team, where he made his debut against Dundalk. He soon became a regular in the side, which competed at the top end of the table. When Martin excelled in a league match against Shelbourne in January 1973, the watching Manchester United manager Tommy Docherty liked what he saw and within 48 hours, Martin was on his way to Old Trafford. He spent two years at United before Johnny Giles took him to West Bromwich Albion in 1975. In 2023, Martin was announced as recipient of a winners medal for Manchester United who were the 1975 second division champions, following historian research and a reduction in the number of eligible games by the EFL. Martin moved to Newcastle United for £100,000 in 1978 and spent five years at the club, making 147 appearances and scoring five goals. He was nicknamed "Zico" by Newcastle fans for his free kick skills and pure football ability. He later played for Vancouver Whitecaps, Cardiff City, Peterborough United, Rotherham United and Preston North End. Internationally, he played for the Republic of Ireland, for whom he won a total of 51 caps. His first cap was against Austria in October 1971 and his last against Spain in April 1983.

After retiring as a player, Martin had spells on the coaching staff at Newcastle and under Liam Brady at Celtic. Martin was also a regular match summariser on Metro Radio and won a Sony Gold award with Magic 1152, along with Justin Lockwood, for the coverage of Alan Shearer's testimonial.

== Personal life ==
His father, Con Martin, was also a Republic of Ireland international and played professionally for Aston Villa; his brother Con Martin Jnr played for Bohemians among others; and his nephew Owen Garvan last played for Colchester United.

== Career statistics ==
=== International ===
Appearances and goals by national team and year
National team	Year	Apps	Goals
Republic of Ireland	1971	1	0
Republic of Ireland	1972	5	1
Republic of Ireland	1973	5	1
Republic of Ireland	1974	5	0
Republic of Ireland	1975	5	1
Republic of Ireland	1976	5	0
Republic of Ireland	1977	4	0
Republic of Ireland	1978	–	
Republic of Ireland	1979	8	1
Republic of Ireland	1980	1	0
Republic of Ireland	1981	5	0
Republic of Ireland	1982	6	0
Republic of Ireland	1983	2	0
Total		52	4

Scores and results list Republic of Ireland's goal tally first, score column indicates score after each Martin goal.

List of international goals scored by Mick Martin
No.	Date	Venue	Opponent	Score	Result	Competition
1	18 June 1972	Machadão, Natal, Brazil	Ecuador	2–1	3–2	Brazilian Independence Cup
2	19 May 1973	Parc des Princes, Paris, France	France	1–1	1–1	1974 FIFA World Cup qualification
3	10 May 1975	Lansdowne Road, Dublin, Republic of Ireland	Switzerland	1–0	2–1	UEFA Euro 1976 qualification
4	17 October 1979	Lansdowne Road, Dublin, Republic of Ireland	Bulgaria	1–0	3–0	UEFA Euro 1980 qualification

== Honours ==
Individual

- Newcastle United Player of the Year: 1981–82
