= Carlos Lugo (Colombian footballer) =

Colombian footballer (born 1953)

Personal information
- Date of birth: 1 September 1953
- Date of death: 21 April 2021 (aged 67)
- Position: Forward

Senior career*
Years	Team	Apps	(Gls)
- Deportes Tolima
- * Club domestic league appearances and goals

Carlos Lugo (1 September 1953 – 21 April 2021) was a Colombian footballer who competed in the 1972 Summer Olympics.
