= 1978 FIFA World Cup qualification – UEFA Group 5 =

Football tournament qualification stage

Group 5 consisted of three of the 32 teams entered into the European zone: (Note: Only 31 of the entered teams actually competed in the qualification tournament: West Germany qualified for the World Cup automatically as defending champions.) Bulgaria, France, and Republic of Ireland. These three teams competed on a home-and-away basis for one of the 8.5 spots in the final tournament allocated to the European zone. The spot would be assigned to the group's winner.

== Standings ==
| Pos | Team | Pld | W | D | L | GF | GA | GD | Pts |
|---|---|---|---|---|---|---|---|---|---|
| 1 | France | 4 | 2 | 1 | 1 | 7 | 4 | +3 | 5 |
| 2 | Bulgaria | 4 | 1 | 2 | 1 | 5 | 6 | −1 | 4 |
| 3 | Republic of Ireland | 4 | 1 | 1 | 2 | 2 | 4 | −2 | 3 |

== Matches ==
9 October 1976

| Bulgaria | 2 – 2 | France |
|---|---|---|
| Bonev 45'; Panov 68' | Report | Platini 37'; Lacombe 40' |

Referee: Foote (Scotland)

17 November 1976

| France | 2 – 0 | Republic of Ireland |
|---|---|---|
| Platini 47'; Bathenay 88' | Report |

Referee: Maksimovic (Yugoslavia)

30 March 1977

| Republic of Ireland | 1 – 0 | France |
|---|---|---|
| Brady 56' | Report |

Referee: Linemayr (Austria)

1 June 1977

| Bulgaria | 2 – 1 | Republic of Ireland |
|---|---|---|
| Panov 14'; Zhelyazkov 76' | Report | Givens 47' |

Referee: Zlatanos (Greece)

12 October 1977

| Republic of Ireland | 0 – 0 | Bulgaria |
|---|---|---|
| | Report |

Referee: Gonella (Italy)

16 November 1977

| France | 3 – 1 | Bulgaria |
|---|---|---|
| Rocheteau 38'; Platini 63'; Dalger 89' | Report | Tsvetkov 85' |

Referee: Corver (Netherlands)
