= Amby Fogarty =

Irish footballer

Personal information
- Full name: Ambrose Gerald Fogarty
- Date of birth: 11 September 1933
- Place of birth: Dublin, Ireland
- Date of death: 3 January 2016 (aged 82)
- Place of death: Limerick, Ireland
- Position: Midfielder

Senior career*
Years	Team	Apps	(Gls)
1953–1955	Bohemians	29	(8)
1955–1957	Glentoran	40	(10)
1957–1963	Sunderland	152	(37)
1963–1966	Hartlepools United	127	(22)
1966–1969	Cork Hibernians	40	(3)
1969–1971	Cork Celtic	29	(3)
1971–1972	Drumcondra	15	(4)
1972–1973	Limerick	20	(0)
1973–1974	Bray Wanderers	?	(?)
1974–1976	Athlone Town	1	(0)
1976–1978	Galway Rovers	6	(0)

International career
1960–1964	Republic of Ireland	11	(3)

Managerial career
- 1966–1969: Cork Hibernians
- 1969–1971: Cork Celtic
- 1971–1972: Drumcondra
- 1972–1974: Bray Wanderers
- 1974–1976: Athlone Town
- 1976–1978: Galway Rovers
- * Club domestic league appearances and goals

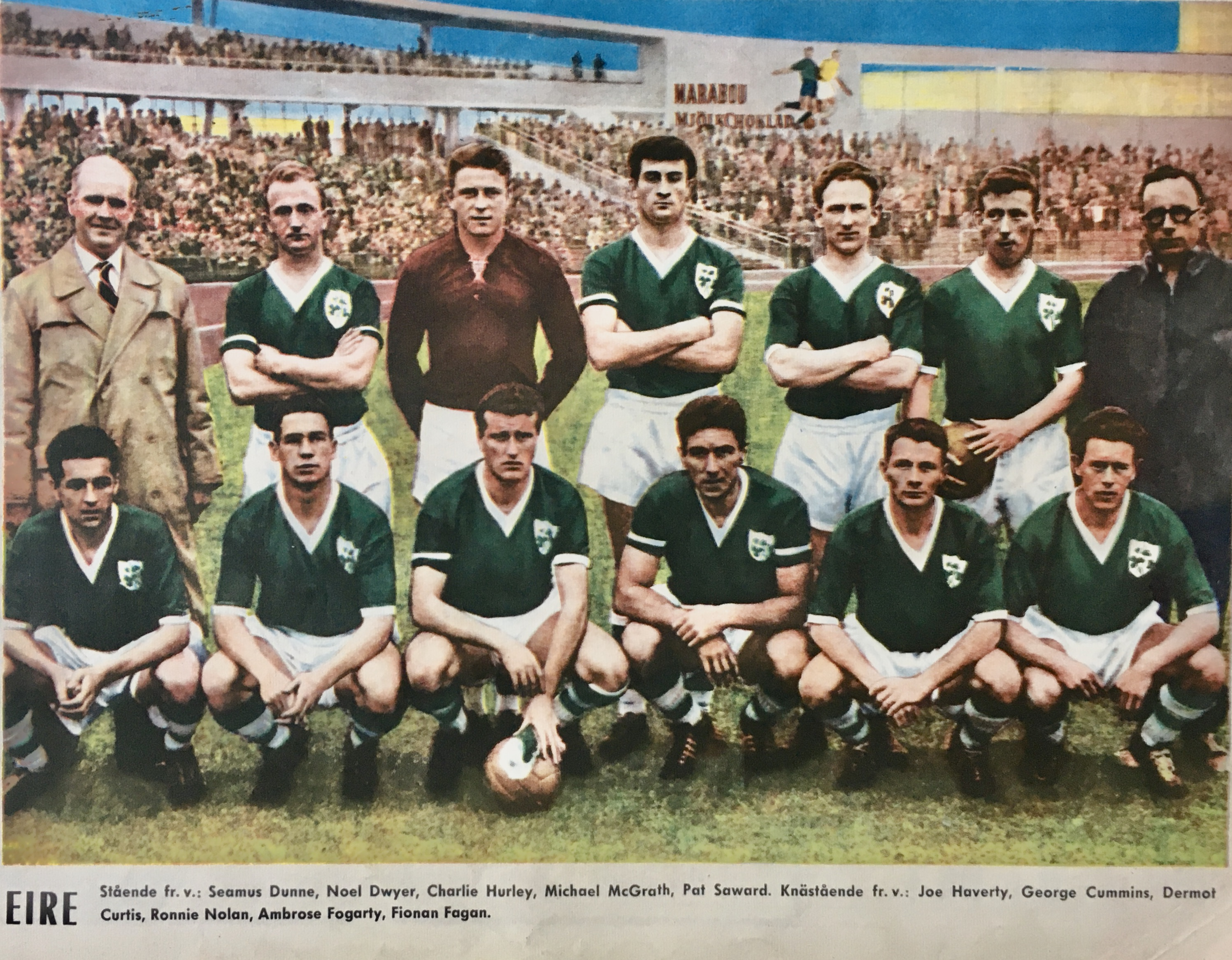
The Republic of Ireland national football team played Sweden national team away in May 1960 – players of the team from left to right, standing; Seamus Dunne, Noel Dwyer, Charlie Hurley. Michael McGrath, Pat Saward; crouched: Joe Haverty, George Cummins, Dermot Curtis, Ronnie Nolan, Ambrose "Amby" Fogarty and Fionan "Paddy" Fagan.

Ambrose Gerald Fogarty (11 September 1933 – 4 January 2016), known as Amby Fogarty, was an Irish professional football player. He played at club level for Bohemians, Glentoran, Sunderland, Hartlepools United, Cork Celtic and Cork Hibernian.

At Roker Park he scored on his home debut against Chelsea and played alongside Charlie Hurley and Brian Clough during the 1961–62 and 1962–63 seasons.

In 1964, he became the first Hartlepools player to make an international appearance when he won the last of his 11 caps for the Republic of Ireland national football team against Spain. Fogarty played under Brian Clough now as manager during the 1965–66 season.

His full international debut for Ireland was on 11 May 1960 when he played in a 1-0 friendly win over West Germany in Düsseldorf.

Fogarty signed as player/manager of Drumcondra in March 1971.

After his football career ended, he was manager of Cork Hibernians, Cork Celtic, Drumcondra, Limerick, and Athlone Town who he managed in a famous 0–0 draw against A.C. Milan in the 1975–76 UEFA Cup. He was the first manager of Galway Rovers in 1977.
