= Garðar Árnason =

Icelandic footballer

Garðar Árnason (born 6 January 1938) is an Icelandic retired footballer who played as a defender for Knattspyrnufélag Reykjavíkur.

He earned 11 caps for Iceland, the first coming on 26 June 1959 in a 4–2 home loss to Denmark at Laugardalsvöllur in qualification for the 1960 Olympics. On 2 September 1962, his penultimate game, he scored his only goal to equalise in a 1–1 draw against the Republic of Ireland; the Irish advanced 5–2 on aggregate in the preliminary round of qualification for the 1964 European Nations' Cup.
