= Eamonn Rogers =

Irish footballer

Personal information
- Full name: Edward Rogers
- Date of birth: 16 April 1947 (age 79)
- Place of birth: Dublin, Ireland
- Position: Midfielder

Youth career
- 1963–1965: Blackburn Rovers

Senior career*
Years	Team	Apps	(Gls)
1965–1971	Blackburn Rovers	177	(39)
1971–1974	Charlton Athletic	39	(3)
1974–1974	Northampton Town	4	(1)
Total		220	(43)

International career
1965–1966	Republic of Ireland U23	2	(1)
1967–1972	Republic of Ireland	19	(5)
- * Club domestic league appearances and goals

Eamonn Rogers (born 16 April 1947) is an Irish former footballer who made 220 appearances in the English Football League playing for Blackburn Rovers, Charlton Athletic and Northampton Town as a midfielder, defender and forward

== Career ==
Rogers turned professional at Ewood Park in May 1965 and made his First Division debut in Rovers' 3-2 defeat at Stoke City four months later.

He was Rovers' joint top scorer in 1967-68 and 1970-71 seasons. Rogers made 177 Appearances for Rovers and scored 39 goals in all competitions. In 2006, he was voted into the Rovers fans team of the decade (1960's). He was also shortlisted for a place in the greatest of all time team.

He made an ill-advised move to Charlton Athletic in an exchange deal involving Barry Endean in October 1971 and spent two injury hit seasons there. He retired from professional football at the end 1973-74 season aged just 27.

He made his international debut for the Republic of Ireland national football team on 22 November 1967 in a 2-1 away win over Czechoslovakia and went on to win a total of 19 international caps and scored 5 times.

His brother John played for Shelbourne in the 1970s.
