= Luxembourg national football team results (1960–1979) =

- Win Draw Loss

This is a list of the Luxembourg national football team results from 1960 to 1979.

== 1960s ==
=== 1960 ===
27 March 1960 1960 Olympics Qualification	Luxembourg	0–0	Switzerland	Luxembourg City, Luxembourg
15:00 UTC+1		Report		Stadium: Stade Municipal; Attendance: 2,500; Referee: Tage Sørensen (Denmark)

10 April 1960 1960 Olympics Qualification	Luxembourg	5–3	France	Luxembourg City, Luxembourg
	Brenner 5' (pen.); Theis 7'; Kunnert 14'; Pilot 53'; Konter 75'	Report	Arab 15'; Quédec 40', 55'	Stadium: Stade Municipal; Referee: Johannes Malka (West Germany)

13 April 1960 1960 Olympics Qualification	Switzerland	2–2	Luxembourg	Basel, Switzerland
	Gottardi 18', 56'	Report	Kunnert 72'; Brenner 87'	Stadium: St. Jakob Stadion; Attendance: 6,500; Referee: Milan Fencl (Czechoslovakia)

19 October 1960 1962 WCQ	Luxembourg	0–9	England	Luxembourg City, Luxembourg
		Report	Charlton 3', 7', 66'; Greaves 16', 83', 85'; Smith 22', 46'; Haynes 61'	Stadium: Stade Municipal; Attendance: 5,500; Referee: Johannes Martens (Netherlands)

=== 1961 ===
19 March 1961 1962 WCQ	Portugal	6–0	Luxembourg	Lisbon, Portugal
	Aguas 32'; Yaúca 49', 53', 61'; Brosius 83' (o.g.); Coluna 85'	Report		Stadium: Estádio Nacional do Jamorr; Attendance: 17,000; Referee: Daniel Mellet (Switzerland)

28 September 1961 1962 WCQ	England	4–1	Luxembourg	London, England
	Pointer 35'; Viollet 37'; Charlton 45', 76'	Report	Dimmer 71'	Stadium: Arsenal Stadium; Attendance: 33,409; Referee: Gérard Versyp (Belgium)

8 October 1961 1962 WCQ	Luxembourg	4–2	Portugal	Luxembourg City, Luxembourg
	Schmit 27', 53', 56'; Hoffmann 84'	Report	Eusébio 82'; Yaúca 89'	Stadium: Stade Municipal; Attendance: 5,229; Referee: Kurt Tschenscher (West Germany)

=== 1962 ===
11 April 1962 Friendly	Luxembourg	1–3	Soviet Union	Luxembourg City, Luxembourg
	Schmit 18'	Report	Mamykin 7', 32'; Gusarov 40'	Stadium: Stade Municipal; Attendance: 12,000; Referee: Raymond Lespineux (Belgium)

=== 1963 ===
11 September 1963 1964 ECQ R16	Netherlands	1–1	Luxembourg	Amsterdam, Netherlands
	Nuninga 5'	Report	May 33'	Stadium: Olympisch Stadion; Attendance: 36,523; Referee: Arthur Blavier (Belgium)

30 October 1963 1964 ECQ R16	Luxembourg	2–1	Netherlands	Rotterdam, Netherlands
	Dimmer 20', 67'	Report	Kruiver 35'	Stadium: De Kuip; Attendance: 42,385; Referee: Marcel Bois (France)

4 December 1963 1964 ECQ QF	Luxembourg	3–3	Denmark	Luxembourg City, Luxembourg
	Pilot 1'; Klein 23', 51'	Report	Madsen 9', 31', 46'	Stadium: Stade Municipal; Attendance: 6,921; Referee: Pierre Schwinte (France)

10 December 1963 1964 ECQ QF	Denmark	2–2	Luxembourg	Copenhagen, Denmark
	Madsen 16', 70'	Report	Léonard 13'; Schmit 84'	Stadium: Idrætsparken; Attendance: 36,294; Referee: Joseph Barbéran (France)

18 December 1963 1964 ECQ QF	Denmark	1–0	Luxembourg	Amsterdam, Netherlands
	Madsen 41'	Report		Stadium: Olympisch Stadion; Attendance: 5,700; Referee: Piet P. Roomer (Netherlands)

=== 1964 ===
20 September 1964 1966 WCQ	Yugoslavia	3–1	Luxembourg	Belgrade, Yugoslavia
	Kovačević 15'; Jerković 25'; Galić 86'	Report	Schmit 71'	Stadium: Stadion Jugoslovenske Narodne Armije; Attendance: 22,166; Referee: Petros Tsouvaras (Greece)

4 October 1964 1966 WCQ	Luxembourg	0–2	France	Luxembourg City, Luxembourg
		Report	Guy 19'; Artelesa 80'	Stadium: Stade Municipal; Attendance: 17,536; Referee: Vital Loraux (Belgium)

8 November 1964 1966 WCQ	Luxembourg	0–2	Norway	Luxembourg City, Luxembourg
		Report	Johansen 28'; Berg 72'	Stadium: Stade Municipal; Attendance: 8,130; Referee: George Powell (Wales)

=== 1965 ===
27 May 1965 1966 WCQ	Norway	4–2	Luxembourg	Trondheim, Norway
	Pedersen 16'; Johansen 61'; Sjøberg 66'; Kristoffersen 77'	Report	Brenner 10' (pen.); Dublin 26'	Stadium: Lerkendal Stadion; Attendance: 22,166; Referee: Martti Hirviniemi (Finland)

19 September 1965 1966 WCQ	Luxembourg	2–5	Yugoslavia	Luxembourg City, Luxembourg
	Pilot 39', 50'	Report	Galić 3', 11'; Džajić 37', 58'; Mušović 42'	Stadium: Stade Municipal; Attendance: 10,780; Referee: Zdeněk Valeš (Czechoslovakia)

6 November 1965 1966 WCQ	France	4–1	Luxembourg	Marseilles, France
	Gondet 8', 27'; Combin 11', 38'	Report	Pilot 53'	Stadium: Stade Vélodrome; Attendance: 30,080; Referee: Daniel Zariquieguizco (Spain)

=== 1966 ===
2 October 1966 1968 ECQ	Poland	4–0	Luxembourg	Szczecin, Poland
	Jarosik 49'; Liberda 54'; Grzegorczyk 73'; Sadek 88'	Report		Stadium: Stadion Pogoń; Attendance: 10,840; Referee: Erwin Vetter (East Germany)

26 November 1966 1968 ECQ	Luxembourg	0–3	France	Luxembourg City, Luxembourg
		Report	Herbet 8'; Revelli 40'; Lech 41'	Stadium: Stade Municipal; Attendance: 3,000; Referee: Laurens van Ravens (Netherlands)

=== 1967 ===
19 March 1967 1968 ECQ	Luxembourg	0–5	Belgium	Luxembourg City, Luxembourg
		Report	Van Himst 20', 36'; Stockman 29', 60', 73'	Stadium: Stade Municipal; Attendance: 9,107; Referee: Karl Göppel (Switzerland)

16 April 1967 1968 ECQ	Luxembourg	0–0	Poland	Luxembourg City, Luxembourg
		Report		Stadium: Stade Municipal; Attendance: 7,229; Referee: Einar Poulsen (Denmark)

22 November 1967 1968 ECQ	Belgium	3–0	Luxembourg	Bruges, Belgium
	Thio 62', 77'; Claessen 65'	Report		Stadium: Stade Klokke; Attendance: 6,745; Referee: William O'Neill (Northern Ireland)

23 December 1967 1968 ECQ	France	3–1	Luxembourg	Paris, France
	Loubet 42', 47', 53'	Report	Klein 85'	Stadium: Parc des Princes; Attendance: 7,320; Referee: Aníbal Oliveira (Portugal)

=== 1968 ===
4 September 1968 1970 WCQ	Netherlands	2–0	Luxembourg	Rotterdam, Netherlands
	Jansen 22'; Van Hanegem 69'	Report		Stadium: De Kuip; Attendance: 48,188; Referee: Hubert Burguet (Belgium)

20 November 1968 Friendly	Denmark	5–1	Luxembourg	Copenhagen, Denmark
	Jensen 10', 38'; Wiberg 15' (pen.), 35', 70' (pen.)	Report	Klein 43' (pen.)	Stadium: Københavns Idrætspark; Attendance: 8,800; Referee: Heinz Siebert (West Germany)

=== 1969 ===
26 March 1969 1970 WCQ	Netherlands	4–0	Luxembourg	Rotterdam, Netherlands
	Cruijff 25'; Van Dijk 35'; Pahlplatz 85', 88'	Report		Stadium: De Kuip; Attendance: 47,207; Referee: John Adair (Northern Ireland)

10 April 1969 Friendly	Luxembourg	2–1	Mexico	Luxembourg City, Luxembourg
	Léonard 63'; Philipp 81'	Report	Jeitz 38' (o.g.)	Stadium: Stade Municipal; Attendance: 6,000; Referee: Pierre Poncin (France)

20 April 1969 1970 WCQ	Poland	8–1	Luxembourg	Kraków, Poland
	Lubański 9', 29', 36', 82', 85'; Deyna 54', 55'; Wilim 64'	Report	Léonard 68'	Stadium: Stadion Miejski; Attendance: 28,327; Referee: Kåre Sirevåg (Norway)

23 April 1969 1970 WCQ	Bulgaria	2–1	Luxembourg	Sofia, Bulgaria
	Asparuhov 31', 49' (pen.)	Report	Léonard 50' (pen.)	Stadium: Vasil Levski National Stadium; Attendance: 18,998; Referee: Doğan Babacan (Turkey)

12 October 1969 1970 WCQ	Luxembourg	1–5	Poland	Luxembourg City, Luxembourg
	Kirchens 38'	Report	Deyna 49', 67'; Jarosik 54' (pen.); Bula 58'; Lubański 60'	Stadium: Stade Municipal; Attendance: 5,431; Referee: Antonio Camacho Jiménez (Spain)

7 December 1969 1970 WCQ	Luxembourg	1–3	Bulgaria	Luxembourg City, Luxembourg
	Philipp 58' (pen.)	Report	Dermendzhiev 35'; Yakimov 37'; Bonev 83'	Stadium: Stade Municipal; Attendance: 4,929; Referee: Iorwerth Jones (Wales)

== 1970s ==
=== 1970 ===
4 January 1970 Friendly	Malta	1–1	Luxembourg	Gżira, Malta
	Cini 85'	Report	Hoffmann 8'	Stadium: The Stadium; Attendance: 7,455; Referee: Alessandro D`Agostini (Italy)

9 May 1970 Friendly	Luxembourg	0–1	Czechoslovakia	Luxembourg City, Luxembourg
		Report	Jurkanin 5'	Stadium: Stade Municipal; Attendance: 3,411; Referee: Anton Bucheli (Switzerland)

14 October 1970 1972 ECQ	Luxembourg	0–2	Yugoslavia	Luxembourg City, Luxembourg
		Report	Bukal 44', 62'	Stadium: Stade Municipal; Attendance: 5,163; Referee: Vital Loraux (Belgium)

15 November 1970 1972 ECQ	Luxembourg	0–5	East Germany	Luxembourg City, Luxembourg
		Report	Vogel 21'; Kreische 29', 36', 39', 78'	Stadium: Stade Municipal; Attendance: 3,795; Referee: Anton Bucheli (Switzerland)

=== 1971 ===
24 February 1971 1972 ECQ	Netherlands	6–0	Luxembourg	Rotterdam, Netherlands
	Lippens 26'; Keizer 53', 80'; Cruijff 59', 69'; Suurbier 83'	Report		Stadium: De Kuip; Attendance: 38,117; Referee: Faik Bajrami (Albania)

24 April 1971 1972 ECQ	East Germany	2–1	Luxembourg	Gera, Germany
	Kreische 31'; Frenzel 88'	Report	Dussier 90'	Stadium: Stadion der Freundschaft; Attendance: 11,276; Referee: Hugh Wilson (Northern Ireland)

20 May 1971 Friendly	Luxembourg	0–4	Belgium	Luxembourg City, Luxembourg
		Report	De Nul 9'; Van Himst 31' (pen.); Semmeling 70'; Van Moer 84'	Stadium: Stade Municipal; Attendance: 4,750; Referee: Ferdinand Biwersi (West Germany)

27 October 1971 1972 ECQ	Yugoslavia	0–0	Luxembourg	Titograd, Yugoslavia
		Report		Stadium: Stadion pod Goricom; Attendance: 10,022; Referee: Muzaffer Sarvan (Turkey)

7 November 1971 Friendly	Belgium	1–0	Luxembourg	Verviers, Belgium
	Vandendaele 62'	Report		Stadium: Stade du Panorama; Attendance: 6,313; Referee: Robert Wurtz (France)

17 November 1971 1972 ECQ	Luxembourg	0–8	Netherlands	Eindhoven, Netherlands
		Report	Cruijff 4', 14', 60'; Keizer 7'; Pahlplatz 12'; Hulshoff 37'; Hoekema 54'; Israël 82'	Stadium: Philips Stadion; Attendance: 12,561; Referee: Michal Jursa Czechoslovakia

=== 1972 ===
26 April 1972 Friendly	Czechoslovakia	6–0	Luxembourg	Plzeň, Czechoslovakia
	Jokl 8'; Čapkovič 25', 58'; Kuna 52', 85'; Dobiaš 68' (pen.)	Report		Stadium: Stadion ve Štruncových Sadech; Attendance: 5,000; Referee: Jan Łazowski (Poland)

7 October 1972 1974 WCQ	Luxembourg	0–4	Italy	Luxembourg City, Luxembourg
		Report	Chinaglia 3'; Riva 6', 36'; Capello 62'	Stadium: Stade Municipal; Attendance: 9,378; Referee: Robert Wurtz (France)

22 October 1972 1974 WCQ	Luxembourg	2–0	Turkey	Esch-sur-Alzette, Luxembourg
	Dussier 14'; Braun 16'	Report		Stadium: Stade de la Frontière; Attendance: 3,960; Referee: Karl Riegg (West Germany)

10 December 1972 1974 WCQ	Turkey	3–0	Luxembourg	Istanbul, Turkey
	Arpacıoğlu 6', 39'; Mesçi 79' (pen.)	Report		Stadium: Mithatpaşa Stadyumu; Attendance: 36,805; Referee: Tofiq Bahramov (Soviet Union)

=== 1973 ===
31 March 1973 1974 WCQ	Italy	5–0	Luxembourg	Genoa, Italy
	Riva 18', 45', 70', 80'; Rivera 63'	Report		Stadium: Stadio Luigi Ferraris; Attendance: 40,430; Referee: Hédi Saoudi (Tunisia)

8 April 1973 1974 WCQ	Luxembourg	0–1	Switzerland	Luxembourg City, Luxembourg
		Report	Odermatt 20'	Stadium: Stade Municipal; Attendance: 8,405; Referee: Franz Wöhrer (Austria)

26 September 1973 1974 WCQ	Switzerland	1–0	Luxembourg	Lucerne, Switzerland
	Blättler 2'	Report		Stadium: Stadion Allmend; Attendance: 17,741; Referee: Wolfgang Riedel (East Germany)

7 October 1973 Friendly	Luxembourg	0–2	Canada	Luxembourg City, Luxembourg
		Report; Report	Parsons 18'; Schiraldi 24'	Stadium: Stade Municipal; Attendance: 1,242; Referee: Joseph Minnoy (Belgium)

4 November 1973 Friendly	Luxembourg	2–1	Norway	Luxembourg City, Luxembourg
	Monacelli 11'; Langers 81'	Report	Sunde 14'	Stadium: Stade Municipal; Attendance: 1,500; Referee: Jean Bancourt (France)

=== 1974 ===
13 October 1974 1976 ECQ	Luxembourg	2–4	Hungary	Luxembourg City, Luxembourg
	Dussier 15', 43' (pen.)	Report	Horváth 18'; Nagy 29', 55'; Bálint 71'	Stadium: Stade Municipal; Attendance: 3,326; Referee: Magnus Pétursson (Iceland)

20 November 1974 1976 ECQ	Wales	5–0	Luxembourg	Swansea, Wales
	Toshack 34'; England 53'; Roberts 70'; Griffiths 73'; Yorath 75'	Report		Stadium: Vetch Field; Attendance: 10,539; Referee: Preben Christophersen (Denmark)

=== 1975 ===
16 March 1975 1976 ECQ	Luxembourg	1–2	Austria	Luxembourg City, Luxembourg
	Braun 12'	Report	Köglberger 58'; Krankl 75'	Stadium: Stade Municipal; Attendance: 5,340; Referee: Leonardus van der Kroft (Netherlands)

1 May 1975 1976 ECQ	Luxembourg	1–3	Wales	Luxembourg City, Luxembourg
	Philipp 39' (pen.)	Report	Reece 24'; James 32', 83'	Stadium: Stade Municipal; Attendance: 3,289; Referee: Jan Peeters (Belgium)

15 October 1975 1976 ECQ	Austria	6–2	Luxembourg	Vienna, Austria
	Welzl 1', 46'; Krankl 38', 76' (pen.); Jara 41'; Prohaska 80'	Report	Braun 4'; Philipp 32'	Stadium: Praterstadion; Attendance: 14,499; Referee: Miroslav Kopal (Czechoslovakia)

19 October 1975 1976 ECQ	Hungary	8–1	Luxembourg	Szombathely, Hungary
	Pintér 13'; Nyilasi 21', 32', 44', 57', 67'; Wollek 78'; Várady 84'	Report	Dussier 83'	Stadium: Stadion Rohonci Út; Attendance: 7,503; Referee: Nikola Dudin (Bulgaria)

=== 1976 ===
21 August 1976 Friendly	Iceland	3–1	Luxembourg	Reykjavík, Iceland
	Þorbjörnsson 18', 21'; Sveinsson 75'	Report	Braun 36'	Stadium: Laugardalsvöllur; Attendance: 2,065; Referee: Brian McGinlay (Scotland)

22 September 1976 1978 WCQ	Finland	7–1	Luxembourg	Helsinki, Finland
	A. Heiskanen 15'; E. Heiskanen 22', 27'; Rissanen 51', 61'; Heikkinen 54'; Mäkynen 82' (pen.)	Report	Zender 52'	Stadium: Helsinki Olympiastadion; Attendance: 4,555; Referee: Svein Thime (Norway)

16 October 1976 1978 WCQ	Luxembourg	1–4	Italy	Luxembourg City, Luxembourg
	Braun 86'	Report	Graziani 24'; Bettega 44', 81'; Antognoni 50'	Stadium: Stade Municipal; Attendance: 11,700; Referee: Ernst Dörflinger (Switzerland)

=== 1977 ===
30 March 1977 1978 WCQ	England	5–0	Luxembourg	London, England
	Keegan 10'; Francis 58'; Kennedy 63'; Channon 69', 81' (pen.)	Report	Dresch (red card)	Stadium: Empire Stadium; Attendance: 78,500; Referee: Paul Bonett (Malta)

26 May 1977 1978 WCQ	Luxembourg	0–1	Finland	Luxembourg City, Luxembourg
		Report	A. Heiskanen 57'	Stadium: Stade Municipal; Attendance: 1,700; Referee: Ole Amundsen (Denmark)

12 October 1977 1978 WCQ	Luxembourg	0–2	England	Luxembourg City, Luxembourg
		Report	Kennedy 31'; Mariner 90'	Stadium: Stade Municipal; Attendance: 10,621; Referee: Alojzy Jarguz (Poland)

3 December 1977 1978 WCQ	Italy	3–0	Luxembourg	Rome, Italy
	Bettega 4'; Graziani 11'; Causio 56'	Report		Stadium: Stadio Olimpico; Attendance: 62,466; Referee: Dušan Maksimović (Yugoslavia)

=== 1978 ===
22 March 1978 Friendly	Luxembourg	1–3	Poland	Luxembourg City, Luxembourg
	Reiter 85'	Report	Lubański 2'; Szarmach 7', 80'	Stadium: Stade Municipal; Attendance: 3,000; Referee: Roland Racine (Switzerland)

7 October 1978 1980 ECQ	Luxembourg	1–3	France	Luxembourg City, Luxembourg
	Michaux 74'	Report	Six 15'; Trésor 63'; Gemmrich 80'	Stadium: Stade Municipal; Attendance: 12,000; Referee: Henk Weerink (Netherlands)

=== 1979 ===
25 February 1979 1980 ECQ	France	3–0	Luxembourg	Paris, France
	Petit 38'; Emon 60'; Larios 78'	Report		Stadium: Parc des Princes; Attendance: 46,988; Referee: Ron Bridges (Wales)

1 May 1979 1980 ECQ	Luxembourg	0–3	Czechoslovakia	Luxembourg City, Luxembourg
		Report	Masný 22'; Gajdůšek 67'; Štambachr 68'	Stadium: Stade Municipal; Attendance: 4,030; Referee: Bruno Galler (Switzerland)

7 June 1979 1980 ECQ	Sweden	3–0	Luxembourg	Malmö, Sweden
	Grönhagen 15'; Cervin 29', 54' (pen.)	Report		Stadium: Malmö Stadion; Attendance: 7,298; Referee: Aleksander Suchanek (Poland)

23 October 1979 1980 ECQ	Luxembourg	1–1	Sweden	Esch-sur-Alzette, Luxembourg
	Braun 4' (pen.)	Report	Grönhagen 61'	Stadium: Stade de la Frontière; Attendance: 2,123; Referee: Walter Horstmann (West Germany)

24 November 1979 1980 ECQ	Czechoslovakia	4–0	Luxembourg	Prague, Czechoslovakia
	Panenka 37'; Masný 39', 45'; Vízek 61'	Report		Stadium: Stadion Letná; Attendance: 17,000; Referee: Marcel van Langenhove (Belgium)
