= 1964 European Nations' Cup qualifying =

Football tournament

Tournament details
- Dates: 21 June 1962 – 27 May 1964
- Teams: 28 (Note: 29 teams entered the competition: Greece withdrew after the draw, having refused to play Albania.)

Tournament statistics
- Matches played: 50
- Goals scored: 158 (3.16 per match)
- Top scorer: (Denmark) Ole Madsen (11 goals)

The 1964 European Nations' Cup qualifying tournament was a football competition that was played from June 1962 to April 1964 to determine the four UEFA member men's national teams which would participate in the 1964 European Nations' Cup final tournament.

== Qualified teams ==
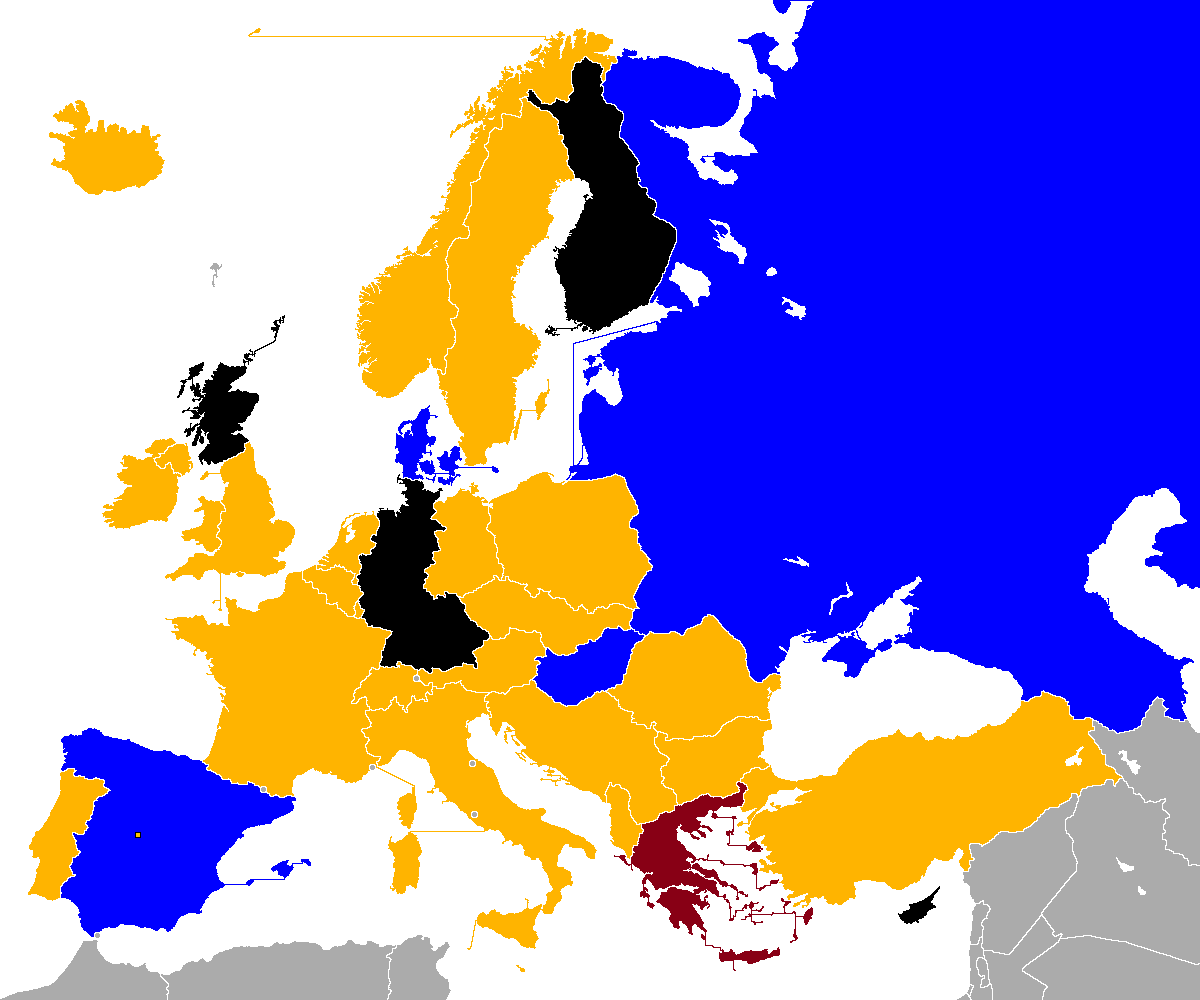
Euro 1964 qualifiers Qualified Did not qualify Withdrew before playing any matches Did not enter Not a UEFA member

Team	Qualified as	Qualified on	Previous appearances in tournament (Note: Bold indicates champion for that year.)
Denmark	Quarter-final winner	18 December 1963	0 (debut)
Spain (host)	Quarter-final winner	8 April 1964	0 (debut)
Hungary	Quarter-final winner	23 May 1964	0 (debut)
Soviet Union	Quarter-final winner	27 May 1964	1 (**1960**)

== Format ==
The qualification was a knockout tournament where the teams would play a two-legged tie on a home-and-away basis. If the aggregate scores were level at the end of the tie, a third leg was played at a neutral venue to decide the winners. It consisted of a preliminary round, a round of 16, and a quarter-final round. The four quarter-final winners would qualify for the tournament proper; one of those four countries would then be chosen to host it.

== Preliminary round ==
Austria, Luxembourg, and the Soviet Union received byes to the round of 16.

Team 1	Agg.	Team 2	1st leg	2nd leg	Replay
Norway	1–3	**Sweden**	0–2	1–1	
Greece	w.o. (Note: Greece withdrew from the competition after they were drawn against Albania in the preliminary round, so Albania were awarded a walkover victory.)	**Albania**	Canc.	Canc.	
**Denmark**	9–2	Malta	6–1	3–1	
**Republic of Ireland**	5–3	Iceland	4–2	1–1	
England	3–6	**France**	1–1	2–5	
Poland	0–4	**Northern Ireland**	0–2	0–2	
**Spain**	7–3	Romania	6–0	1–3	
**Yugoslavia**	4–2	Belgium	3–2	1–0	
**Bulgaria**	5–4	Portugal	3–1	1–3	1–0
**Hungary**	4–2	Wales	3–1	1–1	
**Netherlands**	4–2	Switzerland	3–1	1–1	
**East Germany**	3–2	Czechoslovakia	2–1	1–1	
**Italy**	7–0	Turkey	6–0	1–0	

== Round of 16 ==
Team 1	Agg.	Team 2	1st leg	2nd leg
**Spain**	2–1	Northern Ireland	1–1	1–0
Yugoslavia	2–3	**Sweden**	0–0	2–3
**Denmark**	4–1	Albania	4–0	0–1
Netherlands	2–3	**Luxembourg**	1–1	1–2
Austria	2–3	**Republic of Ireland**	0–0	2–3
Bulgaria	2–3	**France**	1–0	1–3
**Soviet Union**	3–1	Italy	2–0	1–1
East Germany	4–5	**Hungary**	1–2	3–3

== Quarter-finals ==
Team 1	Agg.	Team 2	1st leg	2nd leg	Replay
Luxembourg	5–6	**Denmark**	3–3	2–2	0–1
**Spain**	7–1	Republic of Ireland	5–1	2–0	
France	2–5	**Hungary**	1–3	1–2	
Sweden	2–4	**Soviet Union**	1–1	1–3	

== Goalscorers ==
There were 158 goals scored in 50 matches, for an average of 3.16 goals per match.

11 goals

- (Denmark) Ole Madsen

4 goals

- (Hungary) Lajos Tichy
- (Italy) Alberto Orlando
- (Republic of Ireland) Noel Cantwell

3 goals

- (Bulgaria) Georgi Asparuhov
- (France) Lucien Cossou
- (France) Yvon Goujon
- (Hungary) Ferenc Bene
- (Italy) Gianni Rivera
- (Soviet Union) Viktor Ponedelnik
- (Spain) Amancio Amaro
- (Spain) Vicente Guillot

2 goals

- (Bulgaria) Todor Diev
- (Denmark) Carl Bertelsen
- (Denmark) Eyvind Clausen
- (Denmark) Henning Enoksen
- (East Germany) Dieter Erler
- (France) Maryan Wisnieski
- (Hungary) Flórián Albert
- (Hungary) Károly Sándor
- (Iceland) Ríkharður Jónsson
- (Luxembourg) Camille Dimmer
- (Luxembourg) Henri Klein
- (Netherlands) Piet Kruiver
- (Portugal) Hernâni
- (Republic of Ireland) Amby Fogarty
- (Republic of Ireland) Liam Tuohy
- (Spain) Marcelino Martínez
- (Spain) José Luis Veloso
- (Spain) Pedro Zaballa
- (Sweden) Kurt Hamrin
- (Sweden) Örjan Martinsson
- (Sweden) Örjan Persson
- (Socialist Federal Republic of Yugoslavia) Milan Galić
- (Socialist Federal Republic of Yugoslavia) Josip Skoblar

1 goal

- (Albania) Panajot Pano
- (Austria) Rudi Flögel
- (Austria) Walter Koleznik
- (Belgium) Armand Jurion
- (Belgium) Jacques Stockman
- (Bulgaria) Hristo Iliev
- (Bulgaria) Dimitar Yakimov
- (Czechoslovakia) Rudolf Kučera
- (Czechoslovakia) Václav Mašek
- (Denmark) Carl Emil Christiansen
- (Denmark) Jens Petersen
- (East Germany) Peter Ducke
- (East Germany) Roland Ducke
- (East Germany) Werner Heine
- (East Germany) Kurt Liebrecht
- (East Germany) Jürgen Nöldner
- (England) Ron Flowers
- (England) Bobby Smith
- (England) Bobby Tambling
- (France) Néstor Combin
- (France) Yvon Douis
- (France) Robert Herbin
- (Hungary) Gyula Rákosi
- (Hungary) Ferenc Sipos
- (Hungary) Ernő Solymosi
- (Iceland) Garðar Árnason
- (Italy) Angelo Sormani
- (Luxembourg) Johny Léonard
- (Luxembourg) Paul May
- (Luxembourg) Louis Pilot
- (Luxembourg) Ady Schmit
- (Malta) Eddie Theobald
- (Malta) Joseph Urpani
- (Netherlands) Henk Groot
- (Netherlands) Klaas Nuninga
- (Netherlands) Sjaak Swart
- (Netherlands) Tonny van der Linden
- (Northern Ireland) Billy Bingham
- (Northern Ireland) Johnny Crossan
- (Northern Ireland) Derek Dougan
- (Northern Ireland) Billy Humphries
- (Northern Ireland) Willie Irvine
- (Norway) John Krogh
- (Portugal) Mário Coluna
- (Portugal) Eusébio
- (Republic of Ireland) Andy McEvoy
- (Romania) Gheorghe Constantin
- (Romania) Cicerone Manolache
- (Romania) Nicolae Tătaru
- (Soviet Union) Igor Chislenko
- (Soviet Union) Gennadi Gusarov
- (Soviet Union) Valentin Ivanov
- (Soviet Union) Valery Voronin
- (Spain) Enrique Collar
- (Spain) Josep Maria Fusté
- (Spain) Francisco Gento
- (Sweden) Harry Bild
- (Sweden) Leif Eriksson
- (Switzerland) Anton Allemann
- (Switzerland) Charly Hertig
- (Wales) Cliff Jones
- (Wales) Terry Medwin
- (Socialist Federal Republic of Yugoslavia) Velibor Vasović
- (Socialist Federal Republic of Yugoslavia) Slaven Zambata

1 own goal

- (Romania) Ion Nunweiller (against Spain)
