= 1964 European Nations' Cup round of 16 =

The 1964 European Nations' Cup round of 16 was the second round of the qualifying competition for the 1964 European Nations' Cup. It was contested by the thirteen winners from the preliminary round, along with Austria, Luxembourg and the Soviet Union, who had received a bye. The winners of each of eight home-and-away ties progressed to the quarter-finals. The matches were played in 1963.

== Qualification ==
Each tie winner progressed to the round of 16. The round of 16 was played in two legs on a home-and-away basis. The winners of the round of 16 would go through to the quarter-finals.

== Summary ==
Team 1	Agg.	Team 2	1st leg	2nd leg
Spain	2–1	Northern Ireland	1–1	1–0
Yugoslavia	2–3	Sweden	0–0	2–3
Denmark	4–1	Albania	4–0	0–1
Netherlands	2–3	Luxembourg	1–1	1–2
Austria	2–3	Republic of Ireland	0–0	2–3
Bulgaria	2–3	France	1–0	1–3
Soviet Union	3–1	Italy	2–0	1–1
East Germany	4–5	Hungary	1–2	3–3

== Matches ==
The eight matches took place over two legs, taking place in 1963.

30 May 1963

Spain	1–1	Northern Ireland
Amancio 60'	Report	W. Irvine 76'

San Mamés, Bilbao
Attendance: 27,960
Referee: Cesare Jonni (Italy)
30 October 1963

Northern Ireland	0–1	Spain
	Report	Gento 66'

Windsor Park, Belfast
Attendance: 45,809
Referee: Andries van Leeuwen (Netherlands)

Spain won 2–1 on aggregate and advanced to the quarter-finals.

19 June 1963

Yugoslavia	0–0	Sweden
	Report

Stadion JNA, Belgrade
Attendance: 45,098
Referee: Karl Kainer (Austria)
18 September 1963

Sweden	3–2	Yugoslavia
Persson 30', 60'; Bild 72'	Report	Zambata 21'; Galić 64'

Malmö Stadion, Malmö
Attendance: 20,774
Referee: Jack Taylor (England)

Sweden won 3–2 on aggregate and advanced to the quarter-finals.

29 June 1963

Denmark	4–0	Albania
Petersen 18' (pen.); O. Madsen 25'; Clausen 36'; Enoksen 49'	Report

Idrætsparken, Copenhagen
Attendance: 26,640
Referee: Johan Einar Boström (Sweden)
30 October 1963

Albania	1–0	Denmark
Pano 3'	Report

Stadiumi Qemal Stafa, Tirana
Attendance: 27,765
Referee: Joseph M. Cassar Naudi (Malta)

Denmark won 4–1 on aggregate and advanced to the quarter-finals.

11 September 1963
20:00 UTC+1

Netherlands	1–1	Luxembourg
Nuninga 5'	Report	May 33'

Olympisch Stadion, Amsterdam
Attendance: 36,523
Referee: Arthur Blavier (Belgium)
30 October 1963
20:15 UTC+1

Luxembourg	2–1	Netherlands
Dimmer 20', 67'	Report	Kruiver 35'

Stadion Feyenoord (De Kuip), Rotterdam
Attendance: 42,385
Referee: Marcel Bois (France)

Luxembourg won 3–2 on aggregate and advanced to the quarter-finals.

25 September 1963

Austria	0–0	Republic of Ireland
	Report

Praterstadion, Vienna
Attendance: 26,741
Referee: Gyula Gere (Hungary)
13 October 1963

Republic of Ireland	3–2	Austria
Cantwell 45', 89' (pen.); Fogarty 66'	Report	Koleznik 38'; Flögel 85'

Dalymount Park, Dublin
Attendance: 39,963
Referee: Einar Poulsen (Denmark)

Republic of Ireland won 3–2 on aggregate and advanced to the quarter-finals.

29 September 1963

Bulgaria	1–0	France
Diev 24'	Report

Vasil Levski Stadium, Sofia
Attendance: 25,947
Referee: Faruk Talu (Turkey)
26 October 1963

France	3–1	Bulgaria
Goujon 44', 81'; Herbin 78'	Report	Yakimov 75'

Parc des Princes, Paris
Attendance: 32,233
Referee: José María Ortiz de Mendíbil (Spain)

France won 3–2 on aggregate and advanced to the quarter-finals.

13 October 1963
19:00 UTC+3

Soviet Union	2–0	Italy
Ponedelnik 22'; Chislenko 42'	Report

Central Lenin Stadium, Moscow
Attendance: 102,358
Referee: Ryszard Banasiuk (Poland)
10 November 1963
14:30 UTC+1

Italy	1–1	Soviet Union
Rivera 89'	Report	Gusarov 33'

Stadio Olimpico, Rome
Attendance: 69,567
Referee: Daniel Mellet (Switzerland)

Soviet Union won 3–1 on aggregate and advanced to the quarter-finals.

19 October 1963
14:30 UTC+1

East Germany	1–2	Hungary
Nöldner 51'	Report	Bene 18'; Rákosi 88'

Walter-Ulbricht-Stadion, East Berlin
Attendance: 33,383
Referee: Pyotr Belov (USSR)
3 November 1963
14:00 UTC+1

Hungary	3–3	East Germany
Bene 7'; Sándor 17'; Solymosi 51' (pen.)	Report	Heine 12'; R. Ducke 26'; Erler 81'

Népstadion, Budapest
Attendance: 35,382
Referee: Nedelkovski (Yugoslavia)

Hungary won 5–4 on aggregate and advanced to the quarter-finals.

== Goalscorers ==
There were 41 goals scored in 16 matches, for an average of 2.56 goals per match.

2 goals

- (France national football team) Yvon Goujon
- (Hungary national football team) Ferenc Bene
- (Luxembourg national football team) Camille Dimmer
- (Republic of Ireland national football team) Noel Cantwell
- (Sweden men's national football team) Örjan Persson

1 goal

- (Albania national football team) Panajot Pano
- (Austria national football team) Rudi Flögel
- (Austria national football team) Walter Koleznik
- (Bulgaria national football team) Todor Diev
- (Bulgaria national football team) Dimitar Yakimov
- (Denmark national football team) Eyvind Clausen
- (Denmark national football team) Henning Enoksen
- (Denmark national football team) Ole Madsen
- (Denmark national football team) Jens Petersen
- (East Germany national football team) Roland Ducke
- (East Germany national football team) Dieter Erler
- (East Germany national football team) Werner Heine
- (East Germany national football team) Jürgen Nöldner
- (France national football team) Robert Herbin
- (Hungary national football team) Gyula Rákosi
- (Hungary national football team) Károly Sándor
- (Hungary national football team) Ernő Solymosi
- (Italy national football team) Gianni Rivera
- (Luxembourg national football team) Paul May
- (Netherlands national football team) Piet Kruiver
- (Netherlands national football team) Klaas Nuninga
- (Northern Ireland national football team) Willie Irvine
- (Republic of Ireland national football team) Amby Fogarty
- (Soviet Union national football team) Igor Chislenko
- (Soviet Union national football team) Gennadi Gusarov
- (Soviet Union national football team) Viktor Ponedelnik
- (Spain national football team) Amancio Amaro
- (Spain national football team) Francisco Gento
- (Sweden men's national football team) Harry Bild
- (Yugoslavia national football team) Milan Galić
- (Yugoslavia national football team) Slaven Zambata
