= 1962 FIFA World Cup qualification – UEFA Group 6 =

Football tournament

The three teams in this group played against each other on a home-and-away basis. The group winner qualified for the seventh FIFA World Cup held in Chile.

== Standings ==
Pos	Team	Pld	W	D	L	GF	GA	GD	Pts	Qualification	England national football team	Portugal national football team	Luxembourg national football team
1	England	4	3	1	0	16	2	+14	7	Qualification to 1962 FIFA World Cup	—	2–0	4–1
2	Portugal	4	1	1	2	9	7	+2	3		1–1	—	6–0
3	Luxembourg	4	1	0	3	5	21	−16	2		0–9	4–2	—

Source: FIFA

== Matches ==
19 October 1960

Luxembourg	0–9	England
	Report	Charlton 3', 7', 65'; Greaves 16', 82', 87'; Smith 23', 52'; Haynes 62'

Luxembourg, Luxembourg
Attendance: 6,000
Referee: Martens (Netherlands)

19 March 1961

Portugal	6–0	Luxembourg
Yaúca 53', 66', 83'; Águas 39'; Brosius 50' (o.g.); Coluna 85'	Report

Lisbon, Portugal
Attendance: 17,000
Referee: Mellet (Switzerland)

21 May 1961

Portugal	1–1	England
Águas 59'	Report	Flowers 83'

Lisbon, Portugal
Attendance: 60,000
Referee: Bonetto (Italy)

28 September 1961

England	4–1	Luxembourg
Charlton 44', 80'; Pointer 36'; Viollet 37'	Report	Dimmer 73'

London, England
Attendance: 35,000
Referee: Versyp (Belgium)

8 October 1961

Luxembourg	4–2	Portugal
Schmit 21', 53', 56'; N. Hoffmann 83'	Report	Eusébio 83'; Yaúca 89'

Luxembourg, Luxembourg
Attendance: 6,000
Referee: Tschenscher (West Germany)

25 October 1961

England	2–0	Portugal
Connelly 5'; Pointer 10'	Report

London, England
Attendance: 100,000
Referee: Bois (France)
