= 1970 FIFA World Cup qualification (UEFA) =

Tournament details
- Dates: 19 May 1968 - 7 December 1969
- Teams: 29 (from 1 confederation)

Tournament statistics
- Top scorer(s): (Germany) Gerd Müller (9 goals)

The European (UEFA) zone of qualification for the 1970 FIFA World Cup saw 29 teams competing for eight places at the finals. UEFA members England qualified automatically as the defending champions. The qualification process started on 19 May 1968 and ended on 7 December 1969.

== Format ==
FIFA rejected the entry of Albania, while Iceland and Malta did not enter. The remaining 29 teams were drawn into eight groups, five groups of four teams and three of three teams. All eight group-winners qualified automatically.

== Draw ==
The draw for the qualifying groups took place in Casablanca on 1 February 1968. During the draw procedure, entrants were drawn into the 8 qualifying groups from the four pots of seeds.

Pot A	Pot B	Pot C	Pot D
Bulgaria; France; Hungary; Italy; Portugal; Soviet Union; Spain; West Germany	Czechoslovakia; East Germany; Netherlands; Northern Ireland; Scotland; Sweden; Switzerland; Yugoslavia	Austria; Belgium; Republic of Ireland; Norway; Poland; Romania; Turkey; Wales	Cyprus; Denmark; Finland; Greece; Luxembourg

== Groups ==
=== Group 1 ===
Rank	Team	Pld	W	D	L	GF	GA	GD	Pts	Qualification
1	Romania	6	3	2	1	7	6	+1	8	Qualify for the World Cup
2	Greece	6	2	3	1	13	9	+4	7	
3	Switzerland	6	2	1	3	5	8	−3	5	
4	Portugal	6	1	2	3	8	10	−2	4	

=== Group 2 ===
Rank	Team	Pld	W	D	L	GF	GA	GD	Pts	Qualification
1=	Hungary	6	4	1	1	16	7	+9	9	
1=	Czechoslovakia	6	4	1	1	12	6	+6	9	
3	Denmark	6	2	1	3	6	10	−4	5	
4	Republic of Ireland	6	0	1	5	3	14	−11	1	

Czechoslovakia and Hungary finished level on points, and a play-off on neutral ground was played to decide who would qualify. Czechoslovakia won the play-off to qualify for the World Cup.

=== Group 3 ===
Rank	Team	Pld	W	D	L	GF	GA	GD	Pts	Qualification
1	Italy	4	3	1	0	10	3	+7	7	Qualify for the World Cup
2	East Germany	4	2	1	1	7	7	0	5	
3	Wales	4	0	0	4	3	10	−7	0	

=== Group 4 ===
Rank	Team	Pld	W	D	L	GF	GA	GD	Pts	Qualification
1	Soviet Union	4	3	1	0	8	1	+7	7	Qualify for the World Cup
2	Northern Ireland	4	2	1	1	7	3	+4	5	
3	Turkey	4	0	0	4	2	13	−11	0	

=== Group 5 ===
Rank	Team	Pld	W	D	L	GF	GA	GD	Pts	Qualification
1	Sweden	4	3	0	1	12	5	+7	6	Qualify for the World Cup
2	France	4	2	0	2	6	4	+2	4	
3	Norway	4	1	0	3	4	13	−9	2	

=== Group 6 ===
Rank	Team	Pld	W	D	L	GF	GA	GD	Pts	Qualification
1	Belgium	6	4	1	1	14	8	+6	9	Qualify for the World Cup
2	Yugoslavia	6	3	1	2	19	7	+12	7	
3	Spain	6	2	2	2	10	6	+4	6	
4	Finland	6	1	0	5	6	28	−22	2	

=== Group 7 ===
Rank	Team	Pld	W	D	L	GF	GA	GD	Pts	Qualification
1	West Germany	6	5	1	0	20	3	+17	11	Qualify for the World Cup
2	Scotland	6	3	1	2	18	7	+11	7	
3	Austria	6	3	0	3	12	7	+5	6	
4	Cyprus	6	0	0	6	2	35	−33	0	

=== Group 8 ===
Rank	Team	Pld	W	D	L	GF	GA	GD	Pts	Qualification
1	Bulgaria	6	4	1	1	12	7	+5	9	Qualify for the World Cup
2	Poland	6	4	0	2	19	8	+11	8	
3	Netherlands	6	3	1	2	9	5	+4	7	
4	Luxembourg	6	0	0	6	4	24	−20	0	

== Goalscorers ==
9 goals

- (West Germany) Gerd Müller

7 goals

- (Italy) Luigi Riva
- (Poland) Włodzimierz Lubański

6 goals

- (Belgium) Johan Devrindt
- (Hungary) Ferenc Bene
- (Poland) Kazimierz Deyna
- (Scotland) Colin Stein
- (Sweden) Ove Kindvall

5 goals

- (Austria) Erich Hof
- (Belgium) Odilon Polleunis
- (Czechoslovakia) Jozef Adamec

4 goals

- (Austria) Helmut Redl
- (Bulgaria) Georgi Asparuhov
- (Bulgaria) Hristo Bonev
- (Poland) Andrzej Jarosik
- (Socialist Federal Republic of Yugoslavia) Dragan Džajić

3 goals

- (Czechoslovakia) Karol Jokl
- (Denmark) Ole Sørensen
- (Finland) Arto Tolsa
- (France) Hervé Revelli
- (Greece) Vasilis Botinos
- (Greece) Giorgos Sideris
- (Hungary) Antal Dunai
- (Norway) Ola Dybwad-Olsen
- (Portugal) Eusébio
- (Romania) Florea Dumitrache
- (Scotland) Alan Gilzean
- (Spain) José Eulogio Gárate
- (West Germany) Wolfgang Overath
- (Socialist Federal Republic of Yugoslavia) Vahidin Musemić
- (Socialist Federal Republic of Yugoslavia) Slaven Zambata

2 goals

- (Belgium) Wilfried Puis
- (Bulgaria) Dinko Dermendzhiev
- (Czechoslovakia) Vladimír Hagara
- (Czechoslovakia) Ladislav Kuna
- (Czechoslovakia) Andrej Kvašňák
- (East Germany) Wolfram Löwe
- (East Germany) Eberhard Vogel
- (Finland) Tommy Lindholm
- (France) Jean-Claude Bras
- (Greece) Giorgos Dedes
- (Hungary) Lajos Kocsis
- (Republic of Ireland) Don Givens
- (Italy) Sandro Mazzola
- (Luxembourg) Johny Léonard
- (Netherlands) Theo Pahlplatz
- (Northern Ireland) Terry Harkin
- (Portugal) Jacinto Santos
- (Scotland) Bobby Murdoch
- (Soviet Union) Kakhi Asatiani
- (Soviet Union) Volodymyr Muntyan
- (Soviet Union) Givi Nodia
- (Spain) Amancio Amaro
- (Sweden) Bo Larsson
- (Switzerland) Fritz Künzli
- (Switzerland) Georges Vuilleumier
- (West Germany) Helmut Haller
- (Socialist Federal Republic of Yugoslavia) Josip Bukal
- (Socialist Federal Republic of Yugoslavia) Metodije Spasovski

1 goal

- (Austria) Wilhelm Kreuz
- (Austria) Helmut Siber
- (Austria) August Starek
- (Belgium) Léon Semmeling
- (Bulgaria) Dimitar Penev
- (Bulgaria) Dimitar Yakimov
- (Cyprus) Panicos Efthimiadis
- (Cyprus) Nicos Kantzilieris
- (Czechoslovakia) Dušan Kabát
- (Czechoslovakia) František Veselý
- (Denmark) Bent Jensen
- (Denmark) Ulrik Le Fevre
- (Denmark) Ole Madsen
- (East Germany) Henning Frenzel
- (East Germany) Hans-Jürgen Kreische
- (East Germany) Peter Rock
- (Finland) Turo Flink
- (France) Jean Djorkaeff
- (Greece) Mimis Domazos
- (Greece) Kostas Elefterakis
- (Greece) Giorgos Koudas
- (Greece) Mimis Papaioannou
- (Hungary) Flórián Albert
- (Hungary) János Farkas
- (Hungary) László Fazekas
- (Hungary) Zoltán Halmosi
- (Hungary) Lajos Puskás
- (Hungary) Lajos Szűcs
- (Republic of Ireland) Eamonn Rogers
- (Italy) Angelo Domenghini
- (Luxembourg) Josy Kirchens
- (Luxembourg) Paul Philipp
- (Netherlands) Johan Cruyff
- (Netherlands) Dick van Dijk
- (Netherlands) Willem van Hanegem
- (Netherlands) Wim Jansen
- (Netherlands) Sjaak Roggeveen
- (Netherlands) Wietse Veenstra
- (Netherlands) Henk Wery
- (Northern Ireland) George Best
- (Northern Ireland) William Campbell
- (Northern Ireland) Derek Dougan
- (Northern Ireland) Eric McMordie
- (Northern Ireland) Jimmy Nicholson
- (Norway) Odd Iversen
- (Poland) Bronisław Bula
- (Poland) Jerzy Wilim
- (Portugal) José Augusto de Almeida
- (Portugal) Jacinto João
- (Portugal) Fernando Peres
- (Romania) Emerich Dembrovschi
- (Romania) Nicolae Dobrin
- (Romania) Flavius Domide
- (Scotland) Billy Bremner
- (Scotland) Tommy Gemmell
- (Scotland) Eddie Gray
- (Scotland) Willie Henderson
- (Scotland) Jimmy Johnstone
- (Scotland) Denis Law
- (Scotland) Billy McNeill
- (Soviet Union) Anatoliy Byshovets
- (Soviet Union) Vitaly Khmelnitsky
- (Spain) Juan Manuel Asensi
- (Spain) Miguel Ángel Bustillo
- (Spain) Pirri
- (Spain) Joaquín Sierra
- (Spain) Manuel Velázquez
- (Sweden) Leif Eriksson
- (Sweden) Ove Grahn
- (Sweden) Roland Grip
- (Sweden) Örjan Persson
- (Switzerland) René-Pierre Quentin
- (Turkey) Ender Konca
- (Turkey) Ogün Altıparmak
- (Wales) Mike England
- (Wales) David Powell
- (Wales) John Toshack
- (West Germany) Klaus Fichtel
- (West Germany) Sigfried Held
- (West Germany) Horst-Dieter Höttges
- (West Germany) Reinhard Libuda
- (West Germany) Max Lorenz
- (Socialist Federal Republic of Yugoslavia) Rudolf Belin
- (Socialist Federal Republic of Yugoslavia) Ivica Osim
- (Socialist Federal Republic of Yugoslavia) Miroslav Pavlović
- (Socialist Federal Republic of Yugoslavia) Denijal Pirić
- (Socialist Federal Republic of Yugoslavia) Edin Sprečo

1 own goal

- (Austria) Johann Eigenstiller (playing against West Germany)
- (Portugal) José Augusto Torres (playing against Greece)
- (Switzerland) Bruno Michaud (playing against Romania)
