= UEFA Euro 1968 qualifying Group 7 =

Football tournament qualifying stage

Group 7 of the UEFA Euro 1968 qualifying tournament was one of the eight groups to decide which teams would qualify for the UEFA Euro 1968 finals tournament. Group 7 consisted of four teams: France, Belgium, Poland, and Luxembourg, where they played against each other home-and-away in a round-robin format. The group winners were France, who finished 2 points above Belgium.

== Final table ==
Pos	Team	Pld	W	D	L	GF	GA	GD	Pts	Qualification	(France)	(Belgium)	(Poland)	(Luxembourg)
1	France	6	4	1	1	14	6	+8	9	Advance to quarter-finals	—	1–1	2–1	3–1
2	Belgium	6	3	1	2	14	9	+5	7		2–1	—	2–4	3–0
3	Poland	6	3	1	2	13	9	+4	7		1–4	3–1	—	4–0
4	Luxembourg	6	0	1	5	1	18	−17	1		0–3	0–5	0–0	—

Source: UEFA
Rules for classification: Qualification tiebreakers

== Matches ==
2 October 1966
12:00

Poland	4–0	Luxembourg
Jarosik 49'; Liberda 54'; Grzegorczyk 73'; Sadek 87'	Report

Stadion Pogoń, Szczecin
Attendance: 10,840
Referee: Erwin Vetter (East Germany)

22 October 1966
15:00

France	2–1	Poland
Di Nallo 26'; Lech 85'	Report	Grzegorczyk 61'

Parc des Princes, Paris
Attendance: 23,524
Referee: Gerhard Schulenburg (West Germany)

11 November 1966
15:00

Belgium	2–1	France
Van Himst 51', 54'	Report	Lech 67'

Stade du Heysel, Brussels
Attendance: 43,404
Referee: John Keith Taylor (England)

26 November 1966
15:00

Luxembourg	0–3	France
	Report	Herbet 8'; Revelli 40'; Lech 41'

Stade Municipal, Luxembourg City
Attendance: 3,465
Referee: Laurens van Ravens (Netherlands)

19 March 1967
16:00

Luxembourg	0–5	Belgium
	Report	Van Himst 19', 36'; Stockman 30', 59', 73'

Stade Municipal, Luxembourg City
Attendance: 9,107
Referee: Karl Göppel (Switzerland)

16 April 1967
16:00

Luxembourg	0–0	Poland
	Report

Stade Municipal, Luxembourg City
Attendance: 7,229
Referee: Einar Poulsen (Denmark)

21 May 1967
12:00

Poland	3–1	Belgium
Lubański 28', 41'; Szołtysik 72'	Report	Puis 52'

Stadion Śląski, Chorzów
Attendance: 57,050
Referee: Toimi Olkku (Finland)

17 September 1967
13:00

Poland	1–4	France
Brychczy 26'	Report	Herbin 13'; Di Nallo 33', 85'; Guy 63'

Stadion Dziesięciolecia, Warsaw
Attendance: 51,010
Referee: Ferdinand Marschall (Austria)

8 October 1967
15:00

Belgium	2–4	Poland
Devrindt 15', 35'	Report	Żmijewski 26', 51', 70'; Brychczy 45'

Stade du Heysel, Brussels
Attendance: 35,897
Referee: Juan Garay Gardeazábal (Spain)

28 October 1967
15:00

France	1–1	Belgium
Herbin 84'	Report	Claessen 37'

Stade Marcel Saupin, Nantes
Attendance: 14,591
Referee: Francesco Francescon (Italy)

22 November 1967
19:30

Belgium	3–0	Luxembourg
Thio 62', 76'; Claessen 66'	Report

Stade Klokke, Bruges
Attendance: 6,745
Referee: William O'Neill (Northern Ireland)

23 December 1967
14:30

France	3–1	Luxembourg
Loubet 42', 47', 53'	Report	Klein 85'

Parc des Princes, Paris
Attendance: 7,320
Referee: Aníbal da Silva Oliveira (Portugal)

== Goalscorers ==
There were 42 goals scored in 12 matches, for an average of 3.5 goals per match.

4 goals

- (Belgium) Paul Van Himst

3 goals

- (Belgium) Jacques Stockman
- (France) Fleury Di Nallo
- (France) Georges Lech
- (France) Charly Loubet
- (Poland) Janusz Żmijewski

2 goals

- (Belgium) Roger Claessen
- (Belgium) Johan Devrindt
- (Belgium) Johnny Thio
- (France) Robert Herbin
- (Poland) Lucjan Brychczy
- (Poland) Ryszard Grzegorczyk
- (Poland) Włodzimierz Lubański

1 goal

- (Belgium) Wilfried Puis
- (France) André Guy
- (France) Yves Herbet
- (France) Hervé Revelli
- (Luxembourg) Jean Klein
- (Poland) Andrzej Jarosik
- (Poland) Jan Liberda
- (Poland) Jerzy Sadek
- (Poland) Zygfryd Szołtysik
