= 1970 FIFA World Cup qualification – UEFA Group 8 =

Football tournament qualification stage

The 1970 FIFA World Cup qualification UEFA Group 8 was a UEFA qualifying group for the 1970 FIFA World Cup. The group comprised Bulgaria, Luxembourg, Netherlands and Poland.

== Standings ==
Rank	Team	Pld	W	D	L	GF	GA	GD	Pts
1	Bulgaria	6	4	1	1	12	7	+5	9
2	Poland	6	4	0	2	19	8	+11	8
3	Netherlands	6	3	1	2	9	5	+4	7
4	Luxembourg	6	0	0	6	4	24	−20	0

== Matches ==
4 September 1968

Luxembourg	0–2	Netherlands
	Report	Jansen 22'; Van Hanegem 69'

De Kuip, Rotterdam
Attendance: 48,188
Referee: Hubert Burguet (Belgium)

27 October 1968

Bulgaria	2–0	Netherlands
Bonev 44' (pen.); Asparuhov 65'	Report

Vasil Levski National Stadium, Sofia
Attendance: 18,073
Referee: William Anderson (Scotland)

26 March 1969

Netherlands	4–0	Luxembourg
Cruyff 25'; Van Dijk 30'; Pahlplatz 85', 88'	Report

De Kuip, Rotterdam
Attendance: 47,207
Referee: John Adair (Northern Ireland)

20 April 1969

Poland	8–1	Luxembourg
Lubański 9', 29', 36', 82' (pen.), 85'; Deyna 54', 55'; Wilim 64'	Report	Léonard 68'

Stadion Miejski, Kraków
Attendance: 28,327
Referee: Kåre Sirevaag (Norway)

23 April 1969

Bulgaria	2–1	Luxembourg
Asparuhov 39' (pen.), 49'	Report	Léonard 50' (pen.)

Vasil Levski National Stadium, Sofia
Attendance: 18,998
Referee: Doğan Babacan (Turkey)

7 May 1969

Netherlands	1–0	Poland
Roggeveen 90+1'	Report

De Kuip, Rotterdam
Attendance: 43,658
Referee: Kevin Howley (England)

15 June 1969

Bulgaria	4–1	Poland
Bonev 24'; Dermendzhiev 25'; Penev 72'; Asparuhov 88'	Report	Deyna 27'

Vasil Levski National Stadium, Sofia
Attendance: 38,313
Referee: János Biróczky (Hungary)

7 September 1969

Poland	2–1	Netherlands
Jarosik 56'; Lubański 67'	Report	Wery 20'

Stadion Śląski, Chorzów
Attendance: 70,220
Referee: Iván Pláček (Czechoslovakia)

12 October 1969

Luxembourg	1–5	Poland
Kirchens 37'	Report	Deyna 49', 67'; Jarosik 54' (pen.); Bula 58'; Lubański 61'

Stade municipal, Luxembourg
Attendance: 5,431
Referee: Antonio Camacho Jiménez (Spain)

22 October 1969

Netherlands	1–1	Bulgaria
Veenstra 23'	Report	Bonev 58'

De Kuip, Rotterdam
Attendance: 63,304
Referee: Gunnar Michaelsen (Denmark)

9 November 1969

Poland	3–0	Bulgaria
Jarosik 18', 66'; Deyna 75'	Report

Stadion Dziesięciolecia, Warsaw
Attendance: 61,278
Referee: Andrei Rădulescu (Romania)

7 December 1969

Luxembourg	1–3	Bulgaria
Philipp 58' (pen.)	Report	Dermendzhiev 35'; Yakimov 37'; Bonev 82'

Stade municipal, Luxembourg
Attendance: 4,929
Referee: Iorwerth Price-Jones (Wales)
