= UEFA Euro 1976 qualifying Group 2 =

Football tournament qualification stage

Group 2 of the UEFA Euro 1976 qualifying tournament was one of the eight groups to decide which teams would qualify for the UEFA Euro 1976 finals tournament. Group 2 consisted of four teams: Wales, Hungary, Austria, and Luxembourg, where they played against each other home-and-away in a round-robin format. The group winners were Wales, who finished three points above Hungary.

== Final table ==
Pos	Team	Pld	W	D	L	GF	GA	GD	Pts	Qualification	(Wales)	(Hungary)	(Austria)	(Luxembourg)
1	Wales	6	5	0	1	14	4	+10	10	Advance to quarter-finals	—	2–0	1–0	5–0
2	Hungary	6	3	1	2	15	8	+7	7		1–2	—	2–1	8–1
3	Austria	6	3	1	2	11	7	+4	7		2–1	0–0	—	6–2
4	Luxembourg	6	0	0	6	7	28	−21	0		1–3	2–4	1–2	—

Source: UEFA
Rules for classification: Qualification tiebreakers

== Matches ==
4 September 1974
19:30

Austria	2–1	Wales
Kreuz 63'; Krankl 74'		Griffiths 35'

Praterstadion, Vienna
Attendance: 30,795
Referee: Doğan Babacan (Turkey)

13 October 1974
15:45

Luxembourg	2–4	Hungary
Dussier 15', 43' (pen.)		Horváth 18'; Nagy 29', 55'; Bálint 71'

Stade Municipal, Luxembourg City
Attendance: 3,326
Referee: Magnus Pétursson (Iceland)

30 October 1974
19:30

Wales	2–0	Hungary
Griffiths 57'; Toshack 88'

Ninian Park, Cardiff
Attendance: 8,445
Referee: António da Silva Garrido (Portugal)

20 November 1974
19:30

Wales	5–0	Luxembourg
Toshack 34'; England 53'; P. Roberts 70'; Griffiths 73'; Yorath 75'

Vetch Field, Swansea
Attendance: 10,539
Referee: Preben Christophersen (Denmark)

16 March 1975
15:30

Luxembourg	1–2	Austria
Braun 12'		Köglberger 58'; Krankl 75'

Stade Municipal, Luxembourg City
Attendance: 5,340
Referee: Leonardus van der Kroft (Netherlands)

2 April 1975
19:30

Austria	0–0	Hungary

Praterstadion, Vienna
Attendance: 65,674
Referee: Jack Taylor (England)

16 April 1975
17:30

Hungary	1–2	Wales
Branikovits 77'		Toshack 44'; Mahoney 69'

Népstadion, Budapest
Attendance: 21,080
Referee: Pablo Sánchez Ibáñez (Spain)

1 May 1975
16:00

Luxembourg	1–3	Wales
Philipp 39' (pen.)		Reece 24'; James 32', 83' (pen.)

Stade Municipal, Luxembourg City
Attendance: 3,289
Referee: Jan Peeters (Belgium)

24 September 1975
17:15

Hungary	2–1	Austria
Nyilasi 3'; Pusztai 35'		Krankl 16' (pen.)

Népstadion, Budapest
Attendance: 31,270
Referee: René Vigliani (France)

15 October 1975
19:00

Austria	6–2	Luxembourg
Welzl 1', 46'; Krankl 38', 76' (pen.); Jara 41'; Prohaska 80'		Braun 4'; Philipp 32'

Praterstadion, Vienna
Attendance: 14,499
Referee: Miroslav Kopal (Czechoslovakia)

19 October 1975
13:30

Hungary	8–1	Luxembourg
Pintér 13'; Nyilasi 21', 32', 44', 57', 67'; Wollek 78'; Várady 84'		Dussier 83'

Stadion Rohonci Út, Szombathely
Attendance: 7,503
Referee: Nikola Dudin (Bulgaria)

19 November 1975
19:30

Wales	1–0	Austria
Griffiths 69'

The Racecourse Ground, Wrexham
Attendance: 27,578
Referee: Sergio Gonella (Italy)

== Goalscorers ==
There were 47 goals scored in 12 matches, for an average of 3.92 goals per match.

6 goals

- (Hungary) Tibor Nyilasi

5 goals

- (Austria) Hans Krankl

4 goals

- (Wales) Arfon Griffiths

3 goals

- (Luxembourg) Gilbert Dussier
- (Wales) John Toshack

2 goals

- (Austria) Kurt Welzl
- (Hungary) László Nagy
- (Luxembourg) Nico Braun
- (Luxembourg) Paul Philipp
- (Wales) Leighton James

1 goal

- (Austria) Kurt Jara
- (Austria) Helmut Köglberger
- (Austria) Wilhelm Kreuz
- (Austria) Herbert Prohaska
- (Hungary) László Bálint
- (Hungary) László Branikovits
- (Hungary) József Horváth
- (Hungary) Sándor Pintér
- (Hungary) László Pusztai
- (Hungary) Béla Várady
- (Hungary) Tibor Wollek
- (Wales) Mike England
- (Wales) John Mahoney
- (Wales) Gil Reece
- (Wales) Phil Roberts
- (Wales) Terry Yorath
