= 1964 European Nations' Cup quarter-finals =

Association football competition

The 1964 European Nations' Cup quarter-finals (Association Football) was the third round of qualifying competition for the 1964 European Nations' Cup. They were contested by the eight winners from the round of 16. The winners of each of four home-and-away ties progressed to the final tournament. The matches were played in 1963 and 1964.

== Qualification ==
Each tie winner progressed to the quarter-finals. The quarter-finals were played in two legs on a home-and-away basis. The winners of the quarter-finals would go through to the final tournament.

== Summary ==
Team 1	Agg.	Team 2	1st leg	2nd leg	Replay
Luxembourg	5–6	Denmark	3–3	2–2	0–1
Spain	7–1	Republic of Ireland	5–1	2–0	
France	2–5	Hungary	1–3	1–2	
Sweden	2–4	Soviet Union	1–1	1–3	

== Matches ==
The four matches took place over two legs, taking place in 1963 and 1964.

4 December 1963
19:30 UTC+1

Luxembourg	3–3	Denmark
Pilot 1'; H. Klein 23', 51'	Report	O. Madsen 9', 31', 46'

Stade Municipal, Luxembourg City
Attendance: 6,921
Referee: Pierre Schwinte (France)
10 December 1963
19:00 UTC+1

Denmark	2–2	Luxembourg
O. Madsen 16', 70'	Report	Léonard 13'; Schmit 84'

Idrætsparken, Copenhagen
Attendance: 36,294
Referee: Joseph Barbéran (France)

5–5 on aggregate. A replay was played on a neutral ground to determine the winner.

18 December 1963
20:15 UTC+1

Denmark	1–0	Luxembourg
O. Madsen 41'	Report

Olympisch Stadion, Amsterdam
Attendance: 5,700
Referee: Piet P. Roomer (Netherlands)

Denmark won 6–5 on aggregate and qualified for the 1964 European Nations' Cup.

11 March 1964
20:30 UTC+1

Spain	5–1	Republic of Ireland
Amancio 12', 29'; Fusté 15'; Marcelino 33', 89'	Report	McEvoy 22'

Ramón Sánchez Pizjuán, Seville
Attendance: 27,137
Referee: Lucien van Nuffel (Belgium)
8 April 1964
20:00 UTC+1

Republic of Ireland	0–2	Spain
	Report	Zaballa 25', 88'

Dalymount Park, Dublin
Attendance: 38,027
Referee: Gérard Versyp (Belgium)

Spain won 7–1 on aggregate and qualified for the 1964 European Nations' Cup.

25 April 1964
15:00 UTC+1

France	1–3	Hungary
Cossou 73'	Report	Albert 15'; Tichy 16', 70'

Stade Olympique, Colombes (Paris)
Attendance: 35,274
Referee: Cesare Jonni (Italy)
23 May 1964
17:30 UTC+1

Hungary	2–1	France
Sipos 24'; Bene 55'	Report	Combin 2'

Népstadion, Budapest
Attendance: 70,120
Referee: Concetto Lo Bello (Italy)

Hungary won 5–2 on aggregate and qualified for the 1964 European Nations' Cup.

13 May 1964
19:00 UTC+1

Sweden	1–1	Soviet Union
Hamrin 88'	Report	Ivanov 62'

Råsunda Stadion, Solna (Stockholm)
Attendance: 36,937
Referee: Jim Finney (England)
27 May 1964
19:00 UTC+3

Soviet Union	3–1	Sweden
Ponedelnik 32', 56'; Voronin 83'	Report	Hamrin 78'

Central Lenin Stadium, Moscow
Attendance: 99,609
Referee: Arthur Holland (England)

Soviet Union won 4–2 on aggregate and qualified for the 1964 European Nations' Cup.

== Goalscorers ==
There were 32 goals scored in 9 matches, for an average of 3.56 goals per match.

6 goals

- (Denmark national football team) Ole Madsen

2 goals

- (Hungary national football team) Lajos Tichy
- (Luxembourg national football team) Henri Klein
- (Soviet Union national football team) Viktor Ponedelnik
- (Spain national football team) Amancio Amaro
- (Spain national football team) Marcelino Martínez
- (Spain national football team) Pedro Zaballa
- (Sweden men's national football team) Kurt Hamrin

1 goal

- (France national football team) Néstor Combin
- (France national football team) Lucien Cossou
- (Hungary national football team) Flórián Albert
- (Hungary national football team) Ferenc Bene
- (Hungary national football team) Ferenc Sipos
- (Luxembourg national football team) Johny Léonard
- (Luxembourg national football team) Louis Pilot
- (Luxembourg national football team) Ady Schmit
- (Republic of Ireland national football team) Andy McEvoy
- (Soviet Union national football team) Valentin Ivanov
- (Soviet Union national football team) Valery Voronin
- (Spain national football team) Josep Maria Fusté
