= UEFA Euro 1972 qualifying Group 7 =

Football tournament qualification stage

Group 7 of the UEFA Euro 1972 qualifying tournament was one of the eight groups to decide which teams would qualify for the UEFA Euro 1972 finals tournament. Group 7 consisted of four teams: Yugoslavia, Netherlands, East Germany, and Luxembourg, where they played against each other home-and-away in a round-robin format. The group winners were Yugoslavia, who finished two points above the Netherlands and East Germany.

== Final table ==
Pos	Team	Pld	W	D	L	GF	GA	GD	Pts	Qualification	(Socialist Federal Republic of Yugoslavia)	(Netherlands)	(East Germany)	(Luxembourg)
1	Yugoslavia	6	3	3	0	7	2	+5	9	Advance to quarter-finals	—	2–0	0–0	0–0
2	Netherlands	6	3	1	2	18	6	+12	7		1–1	—	3–2	6–0
3	East Germany	6	3	1	2	11	6	+5	7		1–2	1–0	—	2–1
4	Luxembourg	6	0	1	5	1	23	−22	1		0–2	0–8	0–5	—

Source: UEFA
Rules for classification: Qualification tiebreakers

== Matches ==
11 October 1970
14:30

Netherlands	1–1	Yugoslavia
Israël 50' (pen.)	Report	Džajić 22'

Stadion Feyenoord (De Kuip), Rotterdam
Attendance: 56,200
Referee: William Mullan (Scotland)

14 October 1970
19:30

Luxembourg	0–2	Yugoslavia
	Report	Bukal 44', 62'

Stade Municipal, Luxembourg City
Attendance: 5,163
Referee: Vital Loraux (Belgium)

11 November 1970
18:30

East Germany	1–0	Netherlands
Ducke 56'	Report

Rudolf-Harbig-Stadion, Dresden
Attendance: 30,089
Referee: Curt Liedberg (Sweden)

15 November 1970
14:45

Luxembourg	0–5	East Germany
	Report	Vogel 21'; Kreische 29', 36', 39', 78'

Stade Municipal, Luxembourg City
Attendance: 3,795
Referee: Anton Bucheli (Switzerland)

24 February 1971
20:30

Netherlands	6–0	Luxembourg
Lippens 26'; Keizer 53', 80'; Cruyff 59', 69'; Suurbier 83'	Report

Stadion Feyenoord (De Kuip), Rotterdam
Attendance: 38,117
Referee: Faik Bajrami (Albania)

4 April 1971
15:00

Yugoslavia	2–0	Netherlands
Jerković 8'; Džajić 84'	Report

Stadion Stari plac, Split
Attendance: 15,563
Referee: Kurt Tschenscher (West Germany)

24 April 1971
15:00

East Germany	2–1	Luxembourg
Kreische 31'; Frenzel 88'	Report	Dussier 90'

Stadion der Freundschaft, Gera
Attendance: 11,276
Referee: Hugh Wilson (Northern Ireland)

9 May 1971
15:00

East Germany	1–2	Yugoslavia
Löwe 70'	Report	Filipović 11'; Džajić 19'

Zentralstadion, Leipzig
Attendance: 94,876
Referee: Paul Schiller (Austria)

10 October 1971
14:30

Netherlands	3–2	East Germany
Hulshoff 25'; Keizer 52', 63'	Report	Vogel 10', 82'

Stadion Feyenoord (De Kuip), Rotterdam
Attendance: 48,037
Referee: Concetto Lo Bello (Italy)

16 October 1971
14:30

Yugoslavia	0–0	East Germany
	Report

Stadion JNA, Belgrade
Attendance: 2,340
Referee: Jack Taylor (England)

27 October 1971
14:30

Yugoslavia	0–0	Luxembourg
	Report

Stadion pod Goricom, Titograd
Attendance: 10,022
Referee: Muzaffer Sarvan (Turkey)

17 November 1971
20:00

Luxembourg	0–8	Netherlands
	Report	Cruyff 4', 14', 60'; Keizer 7'; Pahlplatz 12'; Hulshoff 37'; Hoekema 54'; Israël 82'

Philips Stadion, Eindhoven
Attendance: 12,561
Referee: Michal Jursa (Czechoslovakia)

== Goalscorers ==
There were 37 goals scored in 12 matches, for an average of 3.08 goals per match.

5 goals

- (East Germany national football team) Hans-Jürgen Kreische
- (Netherlands national football team) Johan Cruyff
- (Netherlands national football team) Piet Keizer

3 goals

- (East Germany national football team) Eberhard Vogel
- (Yugoslavia national football team) Dragan Džajić

2 goals

- (Netherlands national football team) Barry Hulshoff
- (Netherlands national football team) Rinus Israël
- (Yugoslavia national football team) Josip Bukal

1 goal

- (East Germany national football team) Peter Ducke
- (East Germany national football team) Henning Frenzel
- (East Germany national football team) Wolfram Löwe
- (Luxembourg national football team) Gilbert Dussier
- (Netherlands national football team) Oeki Hoekema
- (Netherlands national football team) Willi Lippens
- (Netherlands national football team) Theo Pahlplatz
- (Netherlands national football team) Wim Suurbier
- (Yugoslavia national football team) Zoran Filipović
- (Yugoslavia national football team) Jurica Jerković
