= Sjaak Roggeveen =

Dutch footballer (born 1942)

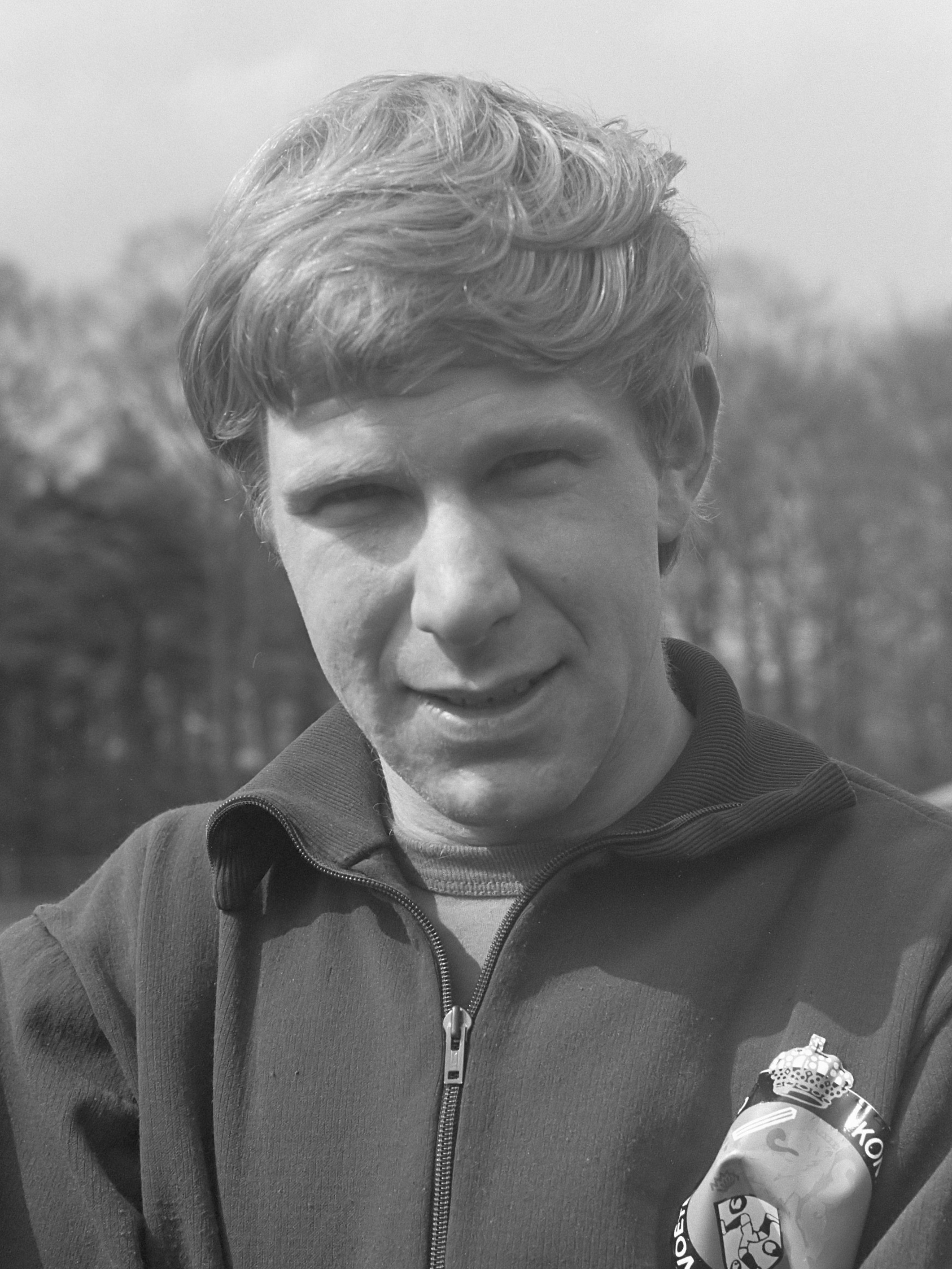

Personal information
- Date of birth: 5 October 1942 (age 84)
- Place of birth: Rotterdam, the Netherlands
- Position: Midfielder

Senior career*
Years	Team	Apps	(Gls)
1959–1965	CVV Rotterdam		
1965–1966	DHC Delft		
1966–1972	FC Den Haag	129	(54)
1972–1979	Excelsior	202	(61)

International career
1969	Netherlands	3	(3)
- * Club domestic league appearances and goals

Sjaak Roggeveen (born 5 October 1942) is a Dutch former international footballer who played for a number of clubs in his native Netherlands. He featured three times for the Netherlands national football team in 1969, scoring three goals.

== Career statistics ==
=== International ===
Appearances and goals by national team and year
National team	Year	Apps	Goals
Netherlands	1969	3	3
Total		3	3

=== International goals ===
Scores and results list the Netherlands' goal tally first.

No	Date	Venue	Opponent	Score	Result	Competition
1.	16 April 1969	De Kuip, Rotterdam, The Netherlands	Czechoslovakia	1–0	2–0	Friendly
2.	16 April 1969	De Kuip, Rotterdam, The Netherlands	Czechoslovakia	2–0	2–0	Friendly
3.	7 May 1969	De Kuip, Rotterdam, The Netherlands	Poland	1–0	1–0	1970 FIFA World Cup qualification
