= Pedro Zaballa =

Spanish footballer

Personal information
- Full name: Pedro Zaballa Barquín
- Date of birth: 29 July 1938
- Place of birth: Castro Urdiales, Spain
- Date of death: 4 June 1997 (aged 58)
- Place of death: Oviedo, Spain
- Height: 1.68 m (5 ft 6 in)
- Position: Forward

Youth career
- 1955–1956: Castro

Senior career*
Years	Team	Apps	(Gls)
1956–1957	Torrelavega		
1957–1958	Rayo Cantabria		
1958–1961	Racing Santander	54	(4)
1961–1967	Barcelona	109	(28)
1967–1970	Sabadell	56	(5)
1970–1971	Oviedo	7	(1)

International career
1961	Spain B	1	(0)
1964	Spain	1	(2)
- * Club domestic league appearances and goals

Pedro Zaballa Barquín (29 July 1938 – 4 June 1997) was a Spanish footballer who played for FC Barcelona between 1961 and 1967, and scored the 2000th goal for Barcelona in La Liga.

He played for CE Sabadell since 1967 until 1970 and scored the first European goal of the club.

== International goals ==
#	Date	Venue	Opponent	Score	Result	Competition
1.	8 April 1964	Dalymount Park, Dublin, Ireland	Republic of Ireland	0–1	0–2	1964 European Nations' Cup qualifying
2.	8 April 1964	Dalymount Park, Dublin, Ireland	Republic of Ireland	0–2	0–2	1964 European Nations' Cup qualifying

== Honours ==
Barcelona

- Inter-Cities Fairs Cup: 1965–66
- Spanish Cup: 1962–63
