= Barry Hulshoff =

Dutch footballer (1946–2020)

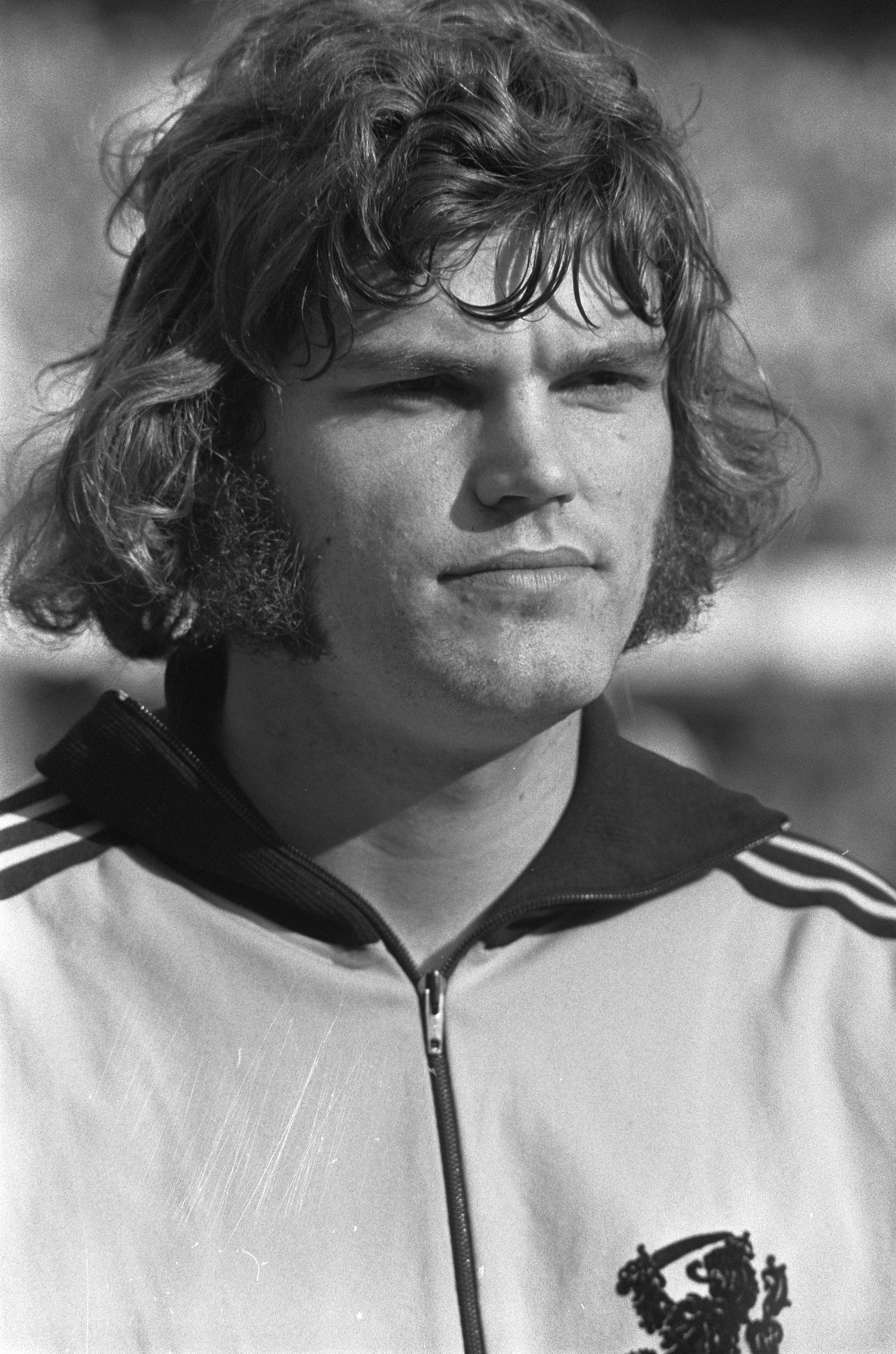
- Hulshoff in 1971

Personal information
- Full name: Bernardus Adriaan Hulshoff
- Date of birth: 30 September 1946
- Place of birth: Deventer, Netherlands
- Date of death: 16 February 2020 (aged 73)
- Place of death: Abcoude, Netherlands
- Position: Defender

Youth career
- 1957–1963: Zeeburgia
- 1963–1965: Ajax

Senior career*
Years	Team	Apps	(Gls)
1965–1977	Ajax	283	(18)
1977–1979	MVV	53	(7)
1982	Grazer AK	3	(0)
Total		339	(25)

International career
1965	Netherlands U19	7	(0)
1971–1973	Netherlands	14	(6)

Managerial career
- 1988–1989: Ajax
- 1989–1991: Lierse
- 1991: PAS Giannina
- 1993–1995: Westerlo
- 1997: Beerschot
- 1997–1998: Sint-Truiden
- 1998–2000: Aalst
- 2001–2002: Mechelen
- * Club domestic league appearances and goals

Bernardus Adriaan "Barry" Hulshoff (30 September 1946 – 16 February 2020) was a Dutch footballer who played as a defender for Ajax. He was part of Ajax's European Cup victories in 1971, 1972 and 1973. He had made his debut for Ajax in de Klassieker against Feyenoord in 1966.

At the end of his career Hulshoff moved to Eijsden in Limburg and played for MVV. He later also played three games in the Austrian Bundesliga.

== International career ==
Hulshoff played 7 games for the Netherlands national under-19 football team and earned 14 caps for the senior Netherlands national team after making his debut against East Germany in 1971. He missed out on the 1974 FIFA World Cup due to a knee injury.

== Managerial career ==
After his playing career, he coached Ajax for one season and then a number of Belgian football teams, including Beerschot.

He also worked in he United States for Ajax America. He became a player agent, representing Matthijs de Ligt after retiring as a manager.

== Career statistics ==
=== International ===
Appearances and goals by national team and year
National team	Year	Apps	Goals
Netherlands	1971	3	3
Netherlands	1972	5	2
Netherlands	1973	6	1
Total		14	6

Scores and results list the Netherlands' goal tally first, score column indicates score after each Hulshoff goal.

List of international goals scored by Barry Hulshoff
No.	Date	Venue	Opponent	Score	Result	Competition
1	10 October 1971	De Kuip, Rotterdam, Netherlands	East Germany	1–1	3–2	UEFA Euro 1972 qualification
2	17 November 1971	Philips Stadion, Eindhoven, Netherlands	Luxembourg	5–0	8–0	UEFA Euro 1972 qualification
3	1 December 1971	Olympisch Stadion, Amsterdam, Netherlands	Scotland	2–1	2–1	Friendly
4	16 February 1972	Karaiskakis Stadium, Athens, Greece	Greece	1–0	5–0	Friendly
5	16 February 1972	Karaiskakis Stadium, Athens, Greece	Greece	2–0	5–0	Friendly
6	12 September 1973	Ullevaal Stadium, Oslo, Norway	Norway	2–1	2–1	1974 FIFA World Cup qualification

== Honours ==
Ajax

- Eredivisie: 1965–66, 1966–67, 1967–68, 1969–70, 1971–72, 1972–73
- KNVB Cup: 1966–67, 1969–70, 1970–71, 1971–72
- European Cup: 1970–71, 1971–72, 1972–73
- European Super Cup: 1972, 1973
- Intercontinental Cup: 1972

Individual

- World XI: 1973
- Sport Ideal European XI: 1973
