= Fernand Brosius =

Luxembourgish footballer (1934–2014)

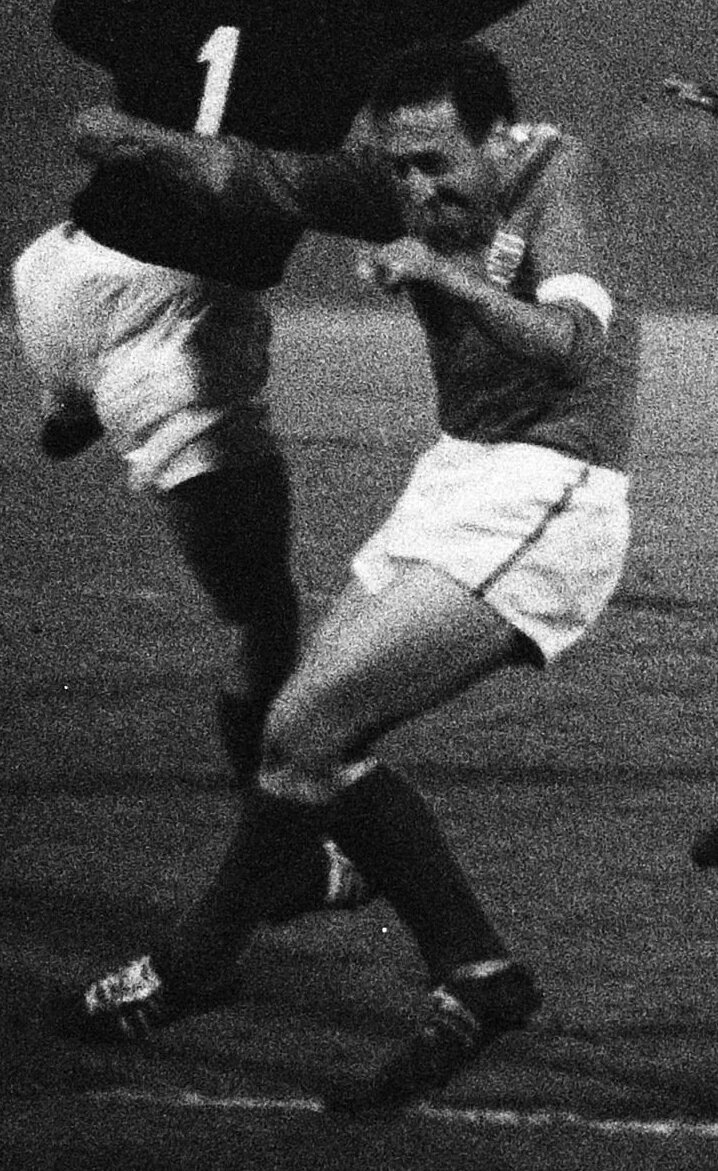
- Fernand with Luxembourg against the Netherlands on 11 September 1963

Personal information
- Full name: Fernand Brosius
- Date of birth: 15 May 1934
- Place of birth: Niederkorn, Luxembourg
- Date of death: 14 January 2014 (aged 79)
- Position: Defender

Senior career*
Years	Team	Apps	(Gls)
1953–1971	Spora Luxembourg		

International career^{‡}
1956–1965	Luxembourg	57	(0)
- * Club domestic league appearances and goals ‡ National team caps and goals as of 8 March 2012

Fernand Brosius (15 May 1934 – 14 January 2014) was a Luxembourgish professional footballer. He was a member of the Luxembourg national team from 1956 to 1965 and was member of the squad who reached the quarter-finals of the 1964 UEFA Championship.
