= Fernand Jeitz =

Luxembourgish footballer

Personal information
- Date of birth: 29 September 1945 (age 81)
- Place of birth: Luxembourg City, Luxembourg
- Height: 1.80 m (5 ft 11 in)
- Position: Defender

Senior career*
Years	Team	Apps	(Gls)
1963–1967	Aris Bonnevoie		
1967–1977	Metz	314	(5)
1977–1979	Thionville		

International career
1965–1973	Luxembourg	35	(0)
- * Club domestic league appearances and goals

Fernand Jeitz (born 29 September 1945) is a retired Luxembourgish footballer from Luxembourg who played as a defender.

== Club career ==
A sweeper, Jeitz left his hometown club Aris Bonnevoie for French league side FC Metz in 1967. In 10 seasons there, he played a total of 357 games and also captained the team for 5 years. An achilles injury ended his stay at Metz.

== International career ==
Jeitz made his debut for Luxembourg in a May 1965 World Cup qualification match against Norway and went on to earn 35 caps, no goals scored. He played in 12 FIFA World Cup qualification matches.

He played his final international game in April 1973, a 0–1 defeat by Switzerland.

== Honours ==
- Luxembourg National Division: 1964, 1966
- Luxembourg Cup: 1967
