= Jean Klein (footballer) =

Luxembourgish footballer

Personal information
- Date of birth: 21 December 1942
- Date of death: 15 December 2025 (aged 82)

International career
Years	Team	Apps	(Gls)
1963–1969	Luxembourg	16	(2)

Jean Klein (born 21 December 1942 – 15 December 2025) was a Luxembourgish footballer. He played in 16 matches for the Luxembourg national football team from 1963 to 1969.
