= Eyvind Clausen =

Danish footballer (1939–2013)

Personal information
- Date of birth: 18 June 1939
- Place of birth: Copenhagen, Denmark
- Date of death: 10 August 2013 (aged 74)
- Positions: Forward; midfielder

Senior career*
Years	Team	Apps	(Gls)
1956–1967	KB		

International career
	Denmark U19	1	(0)
	Denmark U21	3	(0)
1962–1963	Denmark	9	(3)
- * Club domestic league appearances and goals

Eyvind Clausen (18 June 1939 - 10 August 2013) was a Danish footballer who played as a forward and midfielder for KB. He made nine appearances for the Denmark national team between 1962 and 1963.
