= Walter Koleznik =

Austrian footballer (born 1942)

Personal information
- Date of birth: 17 October 1942 (age 84)
- Position: Midfielder

Senior career*
Years	Team	Apps	(Gls)
1961–1978	Grazer AK		

International career
1963–1968	Austria	6	(1)

Managerial career
- 1978: Grazer AK
- * Club domestic league appearances and goals

Walter Koleznik (born 17 October 1942) is an Austrian former footballer who played as a midfielder for Grazer AK. He made six appearances for the Austria national team from 1963 to 1968.
