= Nicky Hoffmann =

Luxembourgish footballer (1940–2018)

Personal information
- Full name: Nicolas Hoffmann
- Date of birth: 19 August 1940
- Date of death: 9 January 2018 (aged 77)
- Position: Midfielder

Senior career*
Years	Team	Apps	(Gls)
- CS Grevenmacher
- Aris Bonnevoie
1969–1975	Etzella Ettelbruck		

International career
1960–1972	Luxembourg	50	(2)

Managerial career
- 1970–1975: Etzella Ettelbruck (player-coach)
- * Club domestic league appearances and goals

Nicolas "Nicky" Hoffmann (19 August 1940 – 9 January 2018) was a Luxembourgish footballer who played as a midfielder. He made 50 appearances for the Luxembourg national team from 1960 to 1972.

== Career ==
In 1969 the Luxembourg Football Federation awarded Hoffmann a merit badge in gold. In 1972 it presented Hoffmann with a golden watch for his merits and for making 50 appearances for the Luxembourg national team.

Hoffmann joined Etzella Ettelbruck in 1969, taking on a double role as player-coach in 1970. Having achieved promotion to the Luxembourg National Division with the club at the end of the 1970–71 season, he reached mid-table league positions in the following four seasons. He left Etzella Ettelbruck in May 1975.
