= Yaúca =

Portuguese footballer

Personal information
- Full name: António Fernandes
- Date of birth: June 18, 1935
- Place of birth: Portugal
- Date of death: January 2, 1992 (aged 56)
- Height: 1.75 m (5 ft 9 in)
- Position: Forward

Senior career*
Years	Team	Apps	(Gls)
1958–1963	Belenenses	125	(96)
1963–1968	Benfica	35	(23)
1970	Toronto First Portuguese		
Total		160	(119)

International career
1959–1965	Portugal	10	(4)
- * Club domestic league appearances and goals

António Fernandes (18 June 1935 – 2 January 1992), known as Yaúca, was a former Portuguese footballer who played as forward.

In the summer of 1970 he played abroad in Canada's National Soccer League with Toronto First Portuguese. In his debut season with Toronto he assisted in securing the NSL Cup by scoring a goal against Toronto Hellas.

== Career ==
Yaúca gained 10 caps and scored 4 goals for Portugal. He made his debut 11 November 1959 in Paris against France, in a 3–5 defeat.
