= Eberhard Vogel =

German football player and manager (1943–2026)

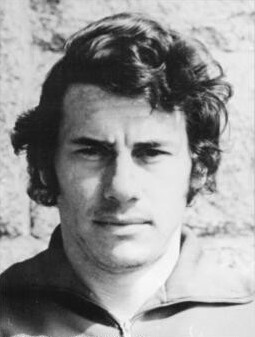
- Vogel in 1974

Personal information
- Date of birth: 8 April 1943
- Place of birth: Altenhain, Gau Saxony, Germany
- Date of death: 1 September 2026 (aged 83)
- Place of death: Thuringia, Germany
- Height: 1.79 m (5 ft 10 in)
- Position: Striker

Youth career
- –1959: SG Niederwiesa
- 1959–1961: FC Karl-Marx-Stadt

Senior career*
| Years | Team | Apps | (Gls) |
| 1961–1970 | FC Karl-Marx-Stadt | 198 | (70) |
| 1970–1982 | Carl Zeiss Jena | 242 | (118) |
| Total | | 440 | (188) |

International career
| 1962–1963 | East Germany U21 | 4 | (1) |
| 1964–1976 | East Germany Olympic | 24 | (10) |
| 1963 | East Germany B | 2 | (0) |
| 1962–1976 | East Germany | 69 | (24) |

Managerial career
- 1983–1990: East Germany youth teams
- 1989–1990: East Germany (assistant)
- 1990–1991: Borussia Mönchengladbach II
- 1991–1992: 1. FC Köln II
- 1992–1993: Hannover 96
- 1994–1996: Carl Zeiss Jena
- 1996–1997: VfB Pößneck
- 1997–1998: Togo
- 1999–2000: FSV Hoyerswerda
- 2000–2001: 1. FC Magdeburg
- 2002–2003: Dresdner SC
- 2004–2006: VfB Sangerhausen
Medal record
Men's football
Olympic Games
Representing Germany
| Bronze medal – third place | 1964 Tokyo | Team competition |
Representing East Germany
| Bronze medal – third place | 1972 Munich | Team competition |
- * Club domestic league appearances and goals

Eberhard "Ebse" Vogel (8 April 1943 – 1 September 2026) was a German footballer and manager.

== Career ==
Vogel played for FC Karl-Marx-Stadt (1961–70) and FC Carl Zeiss Jena (1970–82). His 440 appearances for both clubs combined was the record for East German top-flight football.

On the national level, he played for the East Germany national team (69 matches/24 goals) and was a participant at the 1974 FIFA World Cup.

In 1969, Vogel won the award for the GDR Footballer of the Year.

In 1972, he scored the game-winning goal against rival West Germany national team in the 1972 Summer Olympics.

He graduated with a sports teacher degree at the German University of Physical Culture (German: Deutsche Hochschule für Körperkultur) (DHfK) in Leipzig while still playing and later began coaching career. He first served as a youth coach for the East German Football Association (DFV) from 1983 to 1990; winning the 1986 UEFA European Under-18 Championship, and as an assistant to Eduard Geyer in the East Germany national team, from 1989 to 1990.

After German reunification, he went on to coach Borussia Mönchengladbach and 1. FC Köln reserve teams until 1992. He also led several teams, including Hannover 96 (1992–93), Carl Zeiss Jena (1994–96), VfB Pößneck (1996–97), FSV Hoyerswerda (1999–2000), 1. FC Magdeburg (2000–01), Dresdner SC (2002–03) and VfB Sangerhausen (2004–06). From 1997 to 1998, he was the manager of the Togo national team, participating at the 1998 African Cup of Nations.

Vogel worked as a scout for Carl Zeiss Jena from February 2010 until June 2011, when he retired at the age of 68.

== Death ==
Vogel died on 1 September 2026, at the age of 83.

== Career statistics ==
=== Club ===
Appearances and goals by club, season and competition
| Club | Season | League | | | National cup (Note: Includes FDGB-Pokal) | | Europe (Note: Includes European Cup, UEFA Cup and European Cup Winners' Cup) | | Total | |
| Club | Season | Division | Apps | Goals | Apps | Goals | Apps | Goals | Apps | Goals |
|---|---|---|---|---|---|---|---|---|---|---|
| FC Karl-Marx-Stadt | 1961–62 | DDR-Oberliga | – | | 2 | 2 | — | | 2 | 2 |
| FC Karl-Marx-Stadt | 1962–63 | DDR-Oberliga | 25 | 15 | 2 | 0 | — | | 27 | 15 |
| FC Karl-Marx-Stadt | 1963–64 | DDR-Oberliga | 25 | 7 | – | | — | | 25 | 7 |
| FC Karl-Marx-Stadt | 1964–65 | DDR-Oberliga | 26 | 6 | 1 | 0 | — | | 27 | 6 |
| FC Karl-Marx-Stadt | 1965–66 | DDR-Oberliga | 22 | 5 | 2 | 2 | — | | 24 | 7 |
| FC Karl-Marx-Stadt | 1966–67 | DDR-Oberliga | 24 | 5 | 1 | 0 | — | | 25 | 5 |
| FC Karl-Marx-Stadt | 1967–68 | DDR-Oberliga | 25 | 13 | 1 | 0 | 2 (Note: Appearance(s) in European Cup) | 0 | 28 | 13 |
| FC Karl-Marx-Stadt | 1968–69 | DDR-Oberliga | 26 | 11 | 5 | 4 | — | | 31 | 15 |
| FC Karl-Marx-Stadt | 1969–70 | DDR-Oberliga | 25 | 8 | 4 | 9 | — | | 29 | 17 |
| FC Karl-Marx-Stadt | Total | | 198 | 70 | 18 | 17 | 2 | 0 | 218 | 87 |
| Carl Zeiss Jena | 1970–71 | DDR-Oberliga | 20 | 11 | 3 | 1 | 6 | 3 | 32 | 15 |
| Carl Zeiss Jena | 1971–72 | DDR-Oberliga | 15 | 7 | 3 | 4 | 3 (Note: Appearance(s) in UEFA Cup) | 2 | 21 | 13 |
| Carl Zeiss Jena | 1972–73 | DDR-Oberliga | 21 | 17 | 3 | 3 | 4 (Note: Appearance(s) in European Cup Winners' Cup) | 3 | 28 | 23 |
| Carl Zeiss Jena | 1973–74 | DDR-Oberliga | 24 | 9 | 6 | 2 | 3 | 0 | 33 | 11 |
| Carl Zeiss Jena | 1974–75 | DDR-Oberliga | 23 | 14 | 6 | 4 | 2 | 1 | 31 | 19 |
| Carl Zeiss Jena | 1975–76 | DDR-Oberliga | 25 | 19 | 5 | 4 | 4 | 0 | 34 | 23 |
| Carl Zeiss Jena | 1976–77 | DDR-Oberliga | 16 | 7 | 5 | 2 | – | | 21 | 9 |
| Carl Zeiss Jena | 1977–78 | DDR-Oberliga | 23 | 12 | 3 | 1 | 7 | 3 | 33 | 16 |
| Carl Zeiss Jena | 1978–79 | DDR-Oberliga | 14 | 3 | 2 | 1 | 4 | 0 | 20 | 3 |
| Carl Zeiss Jena | 1979–80 | DDR-Oberliga | 21 | 9 | 3 | 1 | 4 | 0 | 28 | 10 |
| Carl Zeiss Jena | 1980–81 | DDR-Oberliga | 25 | 9 | 2 | 0 | 9 | 0 | 36 | 9 |
| Carl Zeiss Jena | 1981–82 | DDR-Oberliga | 15 | 1 | 3 | 1 | 3 | 0 | 21 | 2 |
| Carl Zeiss Jena | Total | | 242 | 118 | 44 | 24 | 49 | 12 | 335 | 154 |
| Career total | | | 440 | 188 | 62 | 41 | 51 | 12 | 553 | 241 |

=== International ===
Scores and results list East Germany's goal tally first, score column indicates score after each Vogel goal.

List of international goals scored by Eberhard Vogel
| No. | Date | Venue | Opponent | Score | Result | Competition |
|---|---|---|---|---|---|---|
| 1 | 23 May 1965 | Leipzig, East Germany | Hungary | 1–0 | 1–1 | 1966 FIFA World Cup qualification |
| 2 | 5 April 1967 | Leipzig, East Germany | Netherlands | 1–2 | 4–3 | UEFA Euro 1968 qualifying |
| 3 | 29 March 1969 | East Berlin, East Germany | Italy | 1–0 | 2–2 | 1970 FIFA World Cup qualification |
| 4 | 22 October 1969 | Cardiff, Wales | Wales | 1–0 | 3–1 | 1970 FIFA World Cup qualification |
| 5 | 15 November 1970 | Luxembourg City, Luxembourg | Luxembourg | 1–0 | 5–0 | UEFA Euro 1972 qualifying |
| 6 | 10 October 1971 | Rotterdam, Netherlands | Netherlands | 1–0 | 2–3 | UEFA Euro 1972 qualifying |
| 7 | 10 October 1971 | Rotterdam, Netherlands | Netherlands | 2–3 | 2–3 | UEFA Euro 1972 qualifying |
| 8 | 12 October 1975 | Leipzig, East Germany | France | 2–1 | 2–1 | UEFA Euro 1976 qualifying |

== Honours ==
=== As a player ===
FC Karl-Marx-Stadt

- DDR-Oberliga: 1966–67

Carl Zeiss Jena

- FDGB-Pokal: 1971–72, 1973–74, 1979–80

Individual

- East German Footballer of the Year: 1969

=== As a manager ===
East Germany U18

- UEFA European Under-18 Championship: 1986
