= Phil Roberts =

Welsh footballer

Personal information
- Full name: Phillip Stanley Roberts
- Date of birth: 24 February 1950 (age 76)
- Place of birth: Cardiff, Wales
- Position: Defender

Youth career
- 1966–1968: Bristol Rovers

Senior career*
Years	Team	Apps	(Gls)
1968–1973	Bristol Rovers	175	(6)
1973–1978	Portsmouth	153	(1)
1978–1979	Hereford United	3	(0)
1979–1982	Exeter City	105	(0)
1982	Taunton Town		
1982–1983	Yeovil Town	21	(0)
1983–1984	Ottery St Mary		
1984	Weymouth	3	(0)
1984–1985	Chard Town		

International career
1970–1973	Wales U23	6	
1974	Wales	4	(1)
- * Club domestic league appearances and goals

Phillip Stanley Roberts (born 24 February 1950) is a Welsh former professional footballer whose four-club career spanned three decades. Born in Cardiff, Roberts won six Wales Under 23 caps whilst with his first club Bristol Rovers (where he is still widely regarded). In all Roberts was to make 175 appearances for Rovers before moving to Portsmouth in the 1973 close season as part of new chairman John Deacon's ambitious re-building plans. He was to prove such an effective player on the south coast that in 1974 he was awarded four full Welsh caps. Roberts was to hold the right back spot at Fratton Park for four seasons, his final appearance being in the 5–1 thrashing which consigned the club to fourth division football for the first time in their history. A very brief spell with Hereford United followed before another 100-plus stint with Exeter City ended a successful Football League career.
