= Yvon Goujon =

French footballer and coach (born 1937)

Personal information
- Date of birth: 21 January 1937 (age 89)
- Place of birth: Lorient, France
- Position: Midfielder

Youth career
- 1944–1954: Lorient
- 1954–1955: Saint-Étienne

Senior career*
Years	Team	Apps	(Gls)
1955–1959	Saint-Étienne	83	(24)
1959–1960	Sochaux	36	(10)
1960–1961	Limoges	22	(7)
1961–1963	Rennes	59	(20)
1963–1966	Rouen	88	(22)
1966–1969	Angoulême	100	(22)
Total		305	(81)

International career
1960–1963	France	11	(6)

Managerial career
- 1969–1970: Angoulême
- 1970–1972: Limoges
- 1972–1973: Angoulême
- 1986–1987: Congo
- * Club domestic league appearances and goals

Yvon Goujon (born 21 January 1937) is a French former professional football and coach.
