= Georges Lech =

French footballer (born 1945)

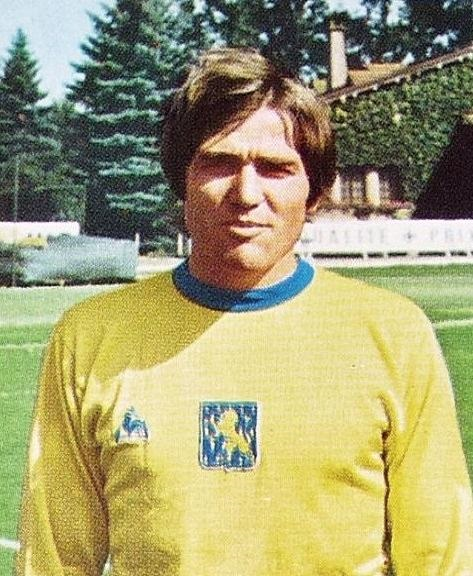
- Lech with FC Sochaux-Montbéliard in 1970

Personal information
- Date of birth: 2 June 1945 (age 81)
- Place of birth: Billy-Montigny, Pas-de-Calais, France
- Height: 1.71 m (5 ft 7 in)
- Position: Forward

Senior career*
Years	Team	Apps	(Gls)
1962–1968	Lens	187	(72)
1968–1972	Sochaux		
1972–1976	Reims		

International career
1963–1973	France	35	(7)
- * Club domestic league appearances and goals

Georges Lech (born 2 June 1945) is a French former professional footballer who played as a forward. He is of Polish descent.
