= Ryszard Grzegorczyk =

Polish footballer (1939–2021)

Personal information
- Full name: Ryszard Paweł Grzegorczyk
- Date of birth: 20 September 1939
- Place of birth: Bytom, Poland
- Date of death: 5 November 2021 (aged 82)
- Place of death: Katowice, Poland
- Height: 1.68 m (5 ft 6 in)
- Position: Midfielder

Senior career*
Years	Team	Apps	(Gls)
1959–1971	Polonia Bytom	302	(20)
1971–1975	RC Lens	91	(2)

International career
1960–1966	Poland	23	(2)

Managerial career
- Olimpia Piekary Śląskie
- Szombierki Bytom
- Gwarek Ornontowice
- GKS Rozbark
- Naprzód Świętochłowice
- Polonia Bytom II
- * Club domestic league appearances and goals

Ryszard Grzegorczyk (20 September 1939 – 5 November 2021) was a Polish footballer who played as a midfielder. He made 23 appearances for the Poland national team, scoring two goals.

He died on 5 November 2021.

== Honours ==
Polonia Bytom

- Ekstraklasa: 1962
