= Willi Lippens =

Footballer

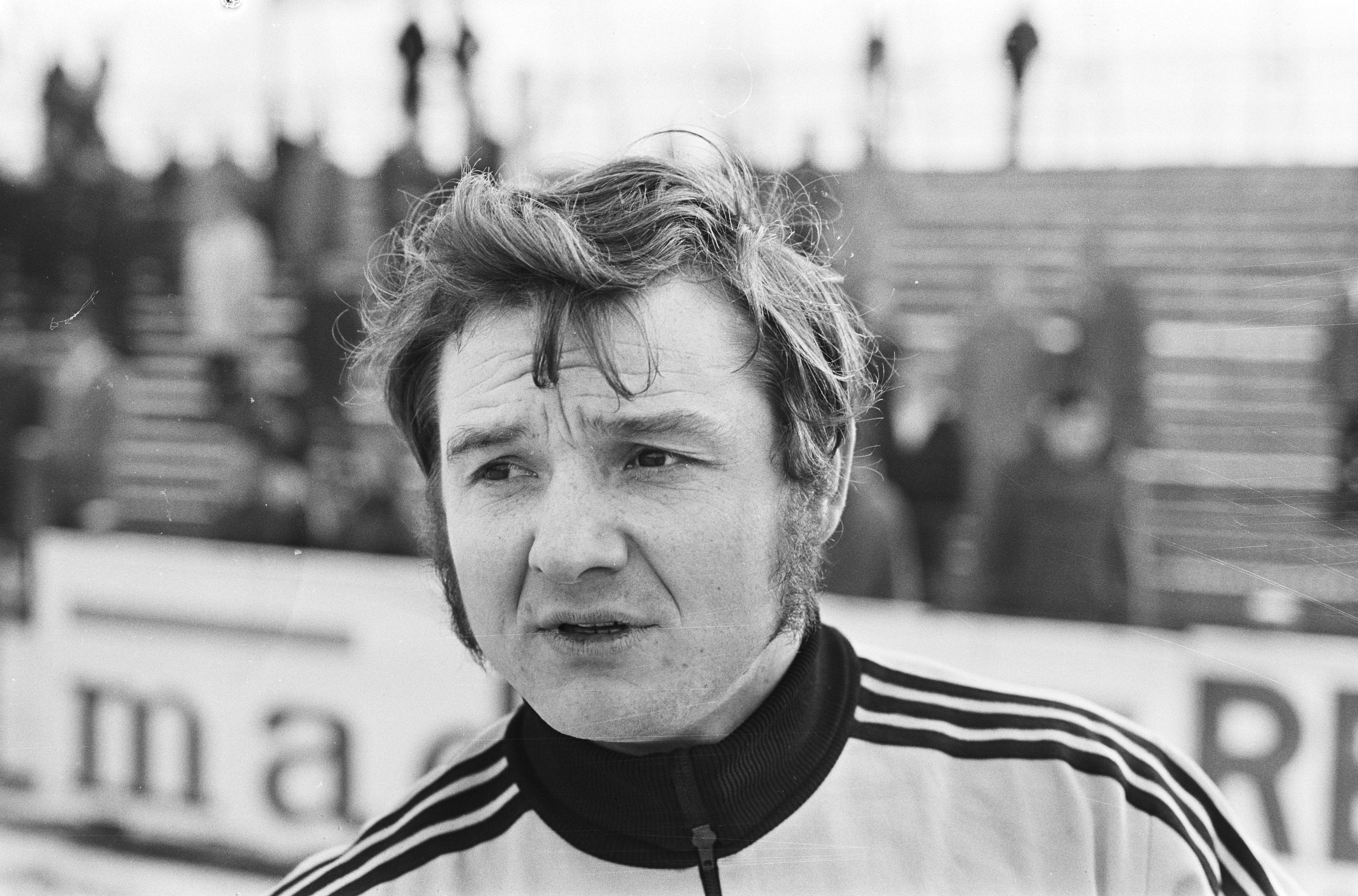
- "Ente" Lippens in 1970

Personal information
- Full name: Willem Gerard Lippens
- Date of birth: 10 November 1945 (age 80)
- Place of birth: Bedburg-Hau, Niederrhein, Germany
- Height: 1.70 m (5 ft 7 in)
- Position: Midfielder

Senior career*
Years	Team	Apps	(Gls)
1966–1976	Rot-Weiss Essen	172	(89)
1976–1979	Borussia Dortmund	70	(13)
1979	Dallas Tornado	25	(15)
1979–1981	Rot-Weiss Essen	67	(23)
1981–1982	Rot-Weiß Oberhausen	2	(0)
Total		336	(140)

International career
1971	Netherlands	1	(1)

Managerial career
- 1998: Rot-Weiss Essen
- * Club domestic league appearances and goals

Willem Gerard "Willi" Lippens (born 10 November 1945) is a former football player. He is nicknamed "Ente" (German for "duck") due to his waddling. Born in Germany, he represented the Netherlands national team.

Born near the German-Dutch border to a Dutch father and a German mother, Lippens spent most of his career playing for German clubs. He played for Rot-Weiss Essen from 1965 to 76 and in 1980–81. Between 1976 and 1979 he played for Borussia Dortmund before leaving to play one season for the Dallas Tornado in the NASL (North American Soccer League).

Lippens played in 242 Bundesliga matches, scoring 92 goals, making him the player who appeared most often for Rot-Weiss at that level of play, as well as their top scorer. Lippens also played an international match for the Netherlands, making him one of eight Dutch football players to have been selected for the Netherlands national team while never having played in the Dutch Eredivisie. The other capped players are Jordi Cruyff, Jerrel Hasselbaink, Rob Reekers, Wim Hofkens, Nathan Aké, and Timothy Fosu-Mensah.

Lippens, who spoke only very basic Dutch, is the only native German-speaker ever to have played for the Netherlands national team. Lippens received several invitations to join the German national selection as well, but always declined as his Dutch father had forbidden him to play for Germany. Lippens has said that he would have liked to have played for Germany, but that his respect for his father, and the experiences his family lived through during the Second World War outweighed this.

Lippens was known for his imaginative footwork, which earned him the nickname Ente (Duck), and was a fan favorite because of his irreverent good humour. One particular anecdote about Lippens has become a cliché in German football culture: A referee once gave Lippens a yellow card, saying: Ich verwarne Ihnen! ("I'm warning you!"), in defective German grammar, using a dative pronoun instead of accusative. Lippens replied: Herr Schiedsrichter, ich danke Sie! ("Sir, I thank You!"), sarcastically using an accusative pronoun instead of a correct dative this time. Lippens was immediately sent off by the referee.

== Career statistics ==
- 107 goals in 155 regional league games Rot-Weiss Essen (1965–1966, 1967–1969, 1971–1973)
- 79 goals in 172 Bundesliga games for Rot-Weiss Essen (1966–1967, 1969–1971, 1973–1976)
- 23 goals in 67 2. Bundesliga-Nord games for Rot-Weiss Essen (1979–1981)
- 13 goals in 70 Bundesliga games for Borussia Dortmund (1976–1979)
