= Piet Kruiver =

Dutch footballer

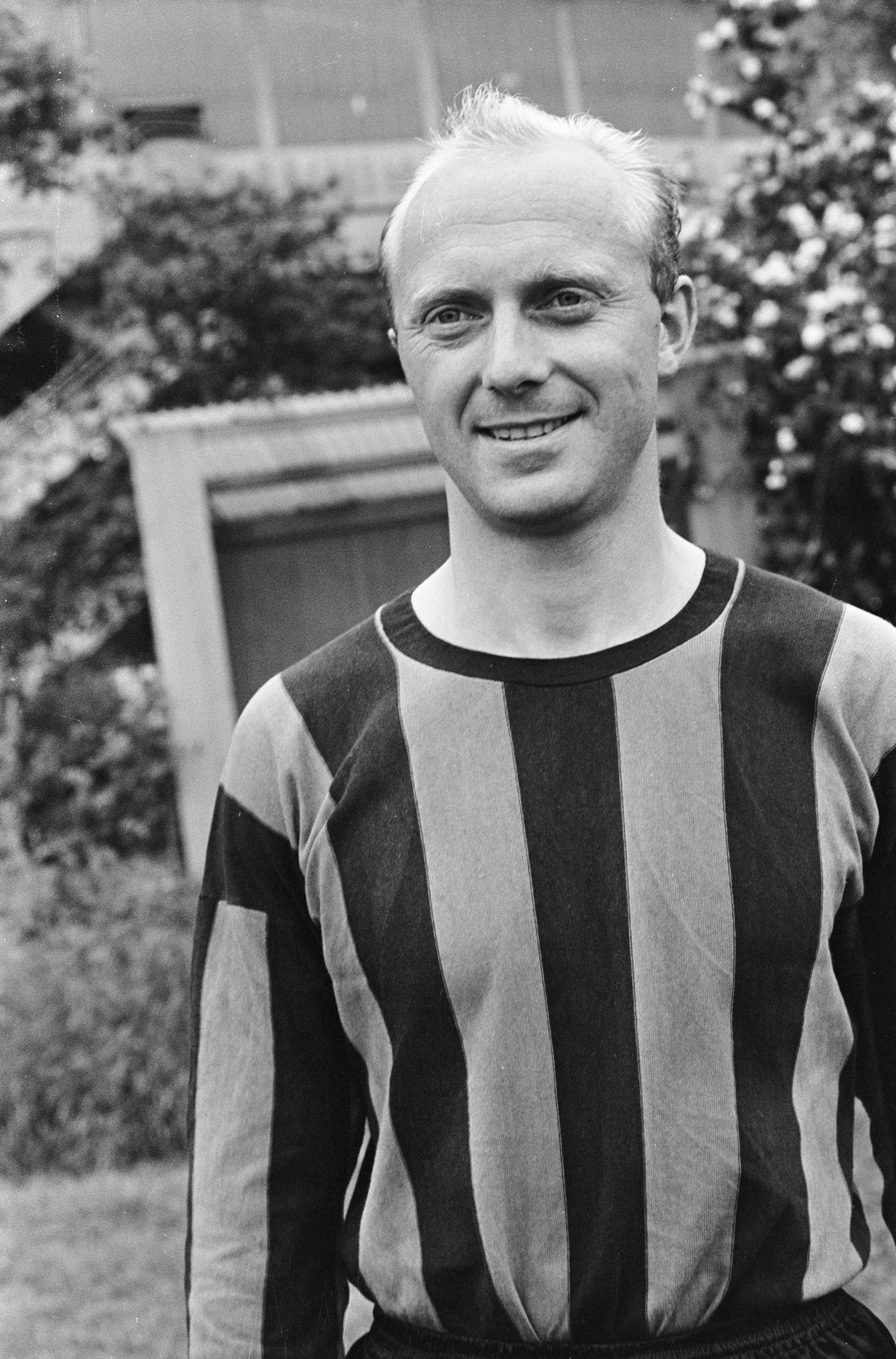

Personal information
- Date of birth: 5 January 1938
- Place of birth: Koog aan de Zaan, Netherlands
- Date of death: 18 March 1989 (aged 51)
- Place of death: Amsterdam, Netherlands
- Position: Striker

Youth career
- KFC Koog aan de Zaan

Senior career*
Years	Team	Apps	(Gls)
1957–1961	PSV Eindhoven	90	(36)
1961–1962	Lanerossi Vicenza	17	(1)
1962–1966	Feyenoord	94	(74)
1966–1968	DWS	52	(24)

International career
1957–1965	Netherlands	22	(12)
- * Club domestic league appearances and goals

Piet Kruiver (5 January 1938 – 18 March 1989) was a Dutch footballer who was active as a striker. Kruiver made his professional debut at PSV Eindhoven and also played for Lanerossi Vicenza, Feyenoord and DWS.

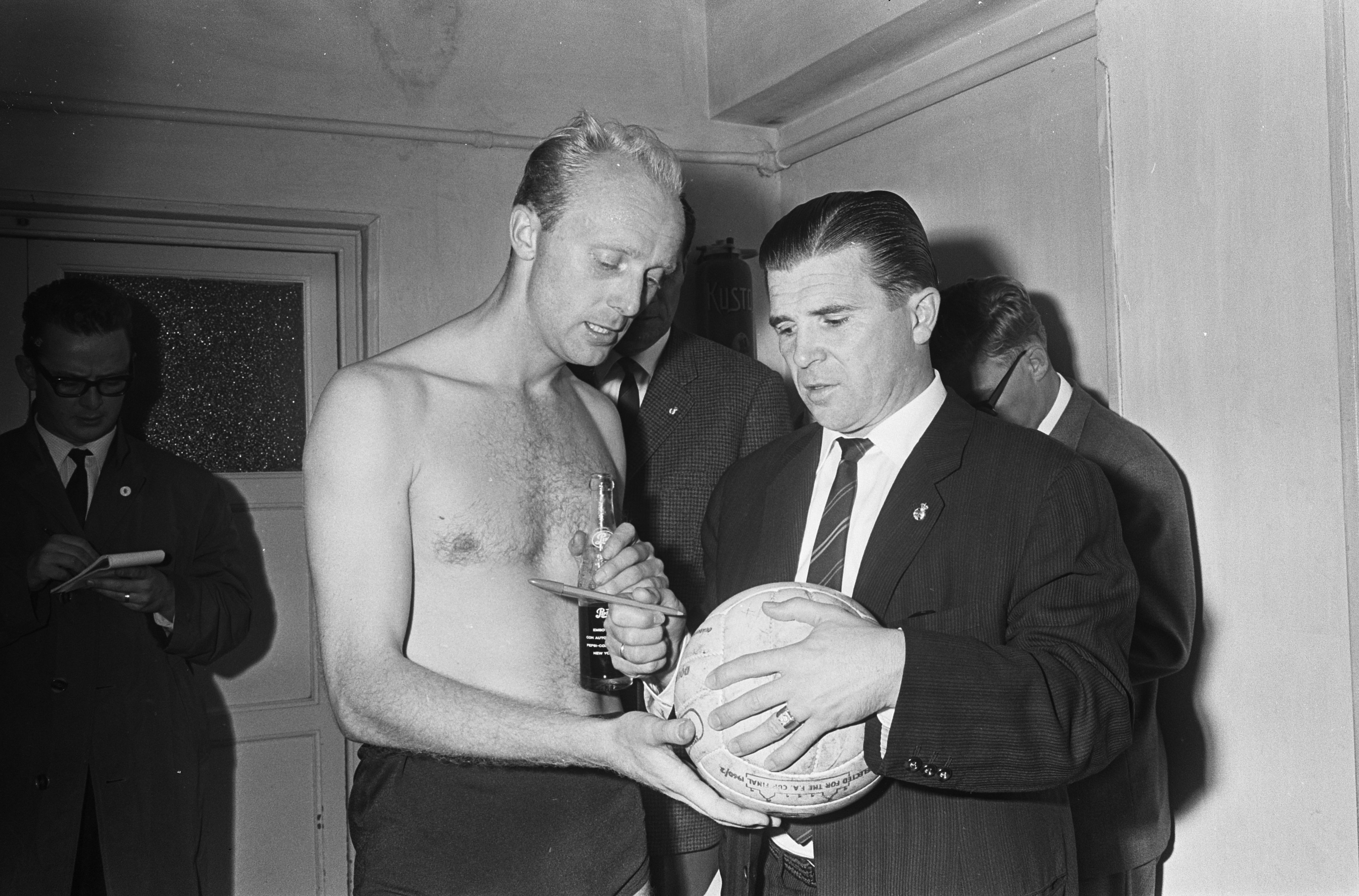
Ferenc Puskás with Feyenoord's Piet Kruiver after losing to Real Madrid 5–0 in the second leg of the first round of the 1965–66 European Cup.

== Honours ==
=== Club ===
Feyenoord

- Eredivisie: 1964–65
- KNVB Cup: 1964–65

=== Individual ===
- Eredivisie top scorer: 1965–66 (shared with Willy van der Kuijlen)
