= Nico Braun =

Luxembourgish footballer (born 1950)

Personal information
- Full name: Nicolas Jean Paul Braun
- Date of birth: 26 October 1950 (age 76)
- Place of birth: Luxembourg City, Luxembourg
- Height: 1.76 m (5 ft 9 in)
- Position: Striker

Youth career
- Walferdange
- Union Luxembourg

Senior career*
Years	Team	Apps	(Gls)
1968–1971	Union Luxembourg	52	(45)
1971–1973	Schalke 04	35	(14)
1973–1978	Metz	170	(96)
1978–1980	Charleroi	37	(9)
1980–1981	FC Thionville	19	(5)
1981–1985	Union Luxembourg	76	(54)
1985–1986	Minerva Lintgen		
Total		389	(223)

International career
1970–1980	Luxembourg	40	(8)
- * Club domestic league appearances and goals

Nico Braun (born 26 October 1950) is a Luxembourgish former professional footballer who played as a striker.

== Club career ==
Braun played for foreign clubs almost all of his career, predominantly in France, but also in Germany where he became the first Luxembourgish professional player in the Bundesliga when he joined Schalke 04 in 1971, before returning to his original club Union Luxembourg.

== International career ==
A prolific striker at club level, Braun won 40 caps for Luxembourg over a period of ten years scoring eight goals.
