= Paul May (footballer) =

Luxembourgish footballer (born 1935)

Personal information
- Date of birth: 20 June 1935 (age 91)
- Position: Midfielder

Senior career*
Years	Team	Apps	(Gls)
- Jeunesse Esch

International career
1958–1965	Luxembourg	24	(4)
- * Club domestic league appearances and goals

Paul Nicolas Michel May (born 20 June 1935) is a Luxembourgish footballer who played as a midfielder for Jeunesse Esch. He made 24 appearances for the Luxembourg national team from 1958 to 1965.
