= Louis Pilot =

Luxembourgish footballer (1940–2016)

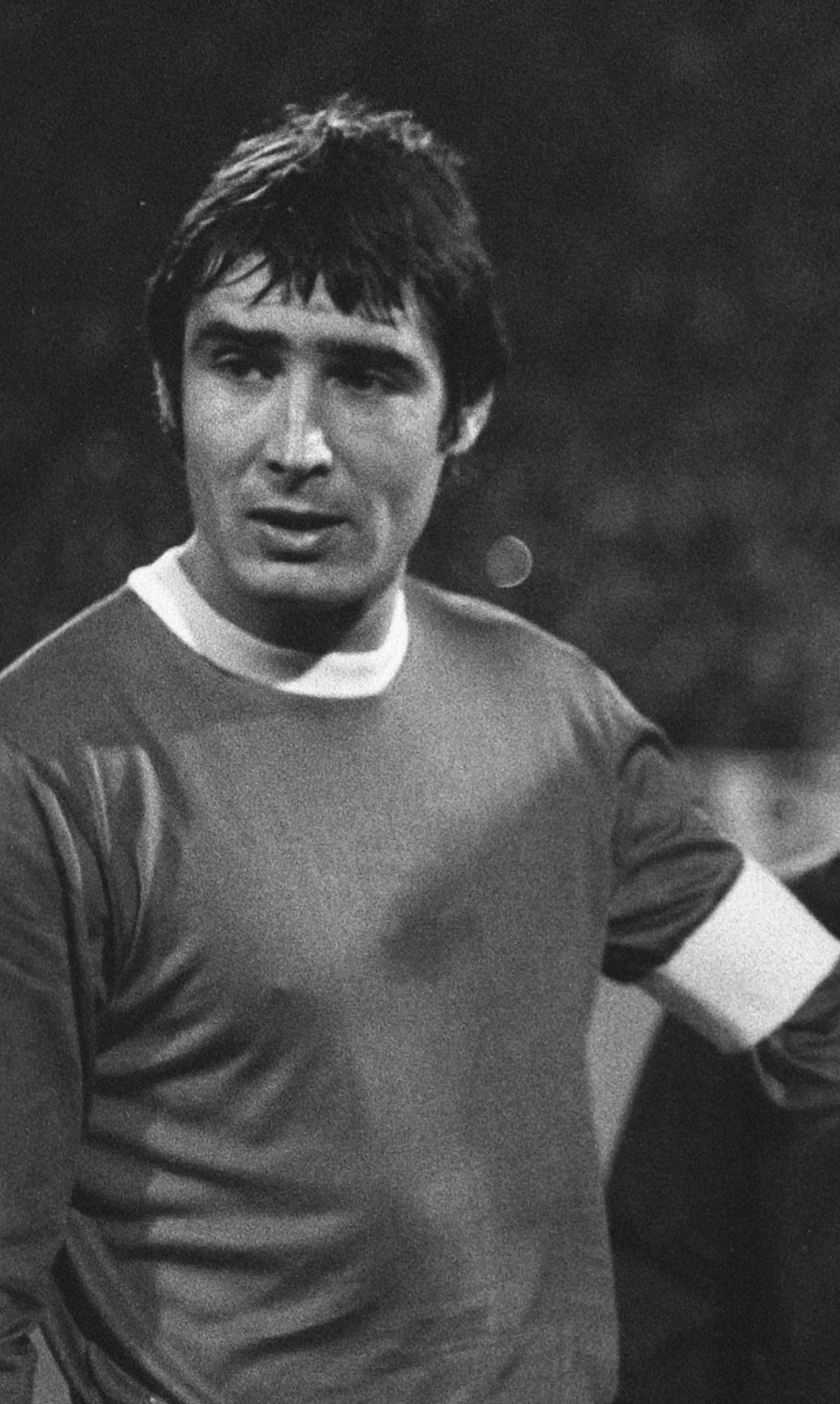
- Pilot in 1974

Personal information
- Date of birth: 11 November 1940
- Place of birth: Esch-sur-Alzette, Luxembourg
- Date of death: 16 April 2016 (aged 75)
- Place of death: Senningen, Luxembourg
- Position: Midfielder

Youth career
- 1953–1957: Fola Esch

Senior career*
| Years | Team | Apps | (Gls) |
| 1957–1961 | Fola Esch | | |
| 1961–1972 | Standard Liège | 337 | (36) |
| 1972–1975 | Antwerp | 125 | (8) |
| 1975–1978 | R. Jet Bruxelles | | |

International career
| 1959–1971 | Luxembourg | 49 | (7) |

Managerial career
- 1978–1984: Luxembourg
- 1984–1985: Standard Liège
- 1985–1988: Etzella Ettelbruck
- 1990: Etzella Ettelbruck
- * Club domestic league appearances and goals

Louis Pilot (11 November 1940 – 16 April 2016) was a Luxembourgish football player and manager.

In November 2003, to celebrate UEFA's jubilee, he was selected by the Luxembourg Football Federation as the country's Golden Player - the greatest player of the last 50 years.

== Playing career ==
Pilot started his footballing career as a midfielder at his home town club Fola Esch, before signing for Belgian team Standard Liège at the age of 20. He went on to play 337 times for Standard, winning four Belgian league titles and two Belgian cups and then moved onto Royal Antwerp and Racing Jet. Pilot also represented the Luxembourg national team, winning 49 caps between 1959 and 1971, scoring seven goals in this time. He played in 14 FIFA World Cup qualification matches.

He retired from playing football in 1978.

== Managerial career ==
Later that year, Pilot returned to Luxembourg and became the national team coach on 12 April, leading his nation in this capacity until 1984, when he became the head coach at the club where he had enjoyed his most successful playing period, Standard Liège. He lasted only one season at Standard, before returning to Luxembourg and taking up similar roles at Etzella Ettelbruck and Avenir Beggen, before assuming a less active role in football.

== Honours ==
=== As a player ===
- Belgian League: 1963, 1969, 1970, 1971
- Belgian Cup: 1966, 1967

Individual

- Luxembourgish Footballer of the Year: 1966, 1970, 1971, 1972
- Luxembourgish Sportsman of the Year: 1968, 1969
