= Gilbert Dussier =

Luxembourgish footballer (1949–1979)

Personal information
- Date of birth: 23 December 1949
- Place of birth: Oïcha-Beri, Belgian Congo
- Date of death: 3 January 1979 (aged 29)
- Height: 1.78 m (5 ft 10 in)
- Position: Striker

Senior career*
Years	Team	Apps	(Gls)
1967–1973	Red Boys Differdange		
1973–1974	Jeunesse Esch		
1974–1975	SV Röchling Völklingen	27	(17)
1975–1977	Nancy	52	(18)
1977–1978	Lille	17	(9)
1978–1979	Thor Waterschei	3	(0)
Total		99	(44)

International career
1971–1978	Luxembourg	39	(9)
- * Club domestic league appearances and goals

Gilbert Dussier (23 December 1949 – 3 January 1979) was a Luxembourgish footballer who played as a striker.

== Club career ==
Dussier played overseas for almost all of his career, predominantly in France, but also in Germany.

He died of leukemia while under contract at Belgian side Thor Waterschei.

== International career ==
Dussier won 39 caps for Luxembourg over a period of seven years, and scored nine goals in the process.
