= Camille Dimmer =

Luxembourgish footballer (1939–2023)

Personal information
- Date of birth: 20 April 1939
- Place of birth: Clervaux, Luxembourg
- Date of death: September 2023 (aged 84)
- Position: Forward

Senior career*
Years	Team	Apps	(Gls)
1957–1959	FC Claravallis		
1959–1960	Anderlecht		
1960–1966	R. Crossing Club Molenbeek		
1966–1967	Red Boys Differdange		

International career
1957–1964	Luxembourg	19	(9)
- * Club domestic league appearances and goals

Camille Dimmer (20 April 1939 – September 2023) was a Luxembourgish professional footballer and politician. By profession, he was an engineer.

== Football career ==
Born in Clervaux on 20 April 1939, Dimmer played for the Luxembourg national team a number of times, most prominently during the country's giant-killing run in the 1964 European Nations' Cup, during which Luxembourg came close to reaching the final four. Dimmer scored both goals in the second leg of the second round, against the Netherlands, to put Luxembourg through to the quarter-finals against Denmark, which Luxembourg lost in a replay after being tied after two legs.

== Political career ==
After his football career, Dimmer went into politics, sitting in the Chamber of Deputies for the Christian Social People's Party (CSV) from 1984 until 1994. Dimmer was General Secretary of the CSV from 1990 until 1995. He held the position of substitute member of the Parliamentary Assembly of the Council of Europe from 1989 to 1994. After leaving the Chamber, he was appointed an honorary member, and was the President of the Association of Former Deputies.

== Death ==
Camille Dimmer died in September 2023, at the age of 84.

== Footnotes ==
Party political offices
Preceded by Willy Bourg	General Secretary of the CSV; 1990–1995	Succeeded by Claude Wiseler
