= Andrzej Jarosik =

Polish footballer (born 1944)

Personal information
- Full name: Andrzej Władysław Jarosik
- Date of birth: 26 November 1944
- Place of birth: Sosnowiec, Poland
- Date of death: 23 April 2024 (aged 79)
- Place of death: Saint-Mandrier-sur-Mer, France
- Height: 1.76 m (5 ft 9 in)
- Position: Forward

Senior career*
Years	Team	Apps	(Gls)
1958–1974	Zaglebie Sosnowiec	265	(113)
1974–1976	RC Strasbourg	17	(3)
1976–1977	Toulon		

International career
1965–1972	Poland	25	(11)
Medal record
Men's football
Representing Poland
Olympic Games
Gold medal – first place	1972 Munich	Team
- * Club domestic league appearances and goals

Andrzej Władysław Jarosik (26 November 1944 – 23 April 2024) was a Polish footballer who played as a forward.

== Club career ==
Born in Sosnowiec, Jarosik started his career in Zagłębie Sosnowiec (1958–1974) and then played for in France with Racing Strasbourg (1974–1976) and SC Toulon (1976–1977). He was a two time scoring champion in the Polish first league, in 1970 with 18 goals and in 1971 with 13 goals.

== International career ==
Jarosik earned 25 caps scoring 11 goals for the Poland national team, having made his debut in 1965 against Bulgaria national football team. His last appearance for the national team was in 1972 also against Bulgaria. He qualified for the Olympic squad in Munich (1972) and won the gold medal. In the game against the Soviet Union he refused to take the pitch because his displeasure of starting the game on the bench. His place was taken by Zygfryd Szołtysik (who ended up scoring a goal).

== Career statistics ==
=== International ===
Appearances and goals by national team and year
National team	Year	Apps	Goals
Poland	1965	1	0
Poland	1966	4	2
Poland	1967	3	0
Poland	1968	6	4
Poland	1969	3	4
Poland	1970	5	1
Poland	1971	2	0
Poland	1972	1	0
Total		25	11

== Personal life ==
After finishing his career as a player Jarosik, along with his family, left for France where he lived until his death in 2024.

== Honours ==
Poland

- Olympic Games gold medal: 1972

Individual

- Ekstraklasa top scorer: 1969–70, 1970–71
