= Paul Philipp =

Luxembourgish footballer

Personal information
- Birth name: Paul Corneille Philipp
- Date of birth: 21 October 1950 (age 76)
- Place of birth: Dommeldange, Luxembourg
- Position: Midfielder

Senior career*
Years	Team	Apps	(Gls)
1966–1969	Avenir Beggen		
1970–1974	Union Saint-Gilloise		
1974–1976	Standard Liège	17	(1)
1976–1980	Union Saint-Gilloise		
1980–1983	Charleroi		
1983–1985	Avenir Beggen		

International career
1968–1982	Luxembourg	54	(4)

Managerial career
- 1983–1985: Avenir Beggen
- 1985–2001: Luxembourg
- * Club domestic league appearances and goals

Paul Corneille Philipp (born 21 October 1950) is a Luxembourgish football administrator and former player and manager serving as president of the Luxembourg Football Federation since 2004.

He previously managed the Luxembourg national team from 1985 to 2001, making him the sixth longest serving national team manager in history.

== Club career ==
As a player, Philipp started his career at local club Avenir Beggen before moving to Belgium to play for 3 different teams in 13 seasons there. He finished his career back at Avenir in 1985.

== International career ==
He made his debut for Luxembourg in 1968 and went on to earn 54 caps, scoring 4 goals. He played in 17 FIFA World Cup qualification matches.

== Manager career ==
Philipp managed Avenir Beggen before managing the Luxembourg national team between 1985 and 2001, during which time the team won three matches, all in the 1996 European Championship qualifying round, one of which was an upset win over the Czech Republic. The two other were against Malta, home and away.

== Career statistics ==
=== International goals ===
#	Date	Venue	Opponent	Score	Result	Competition
1.	10 April 1969	Stade Municipal, Luxembourg City, Luxembourg	Mexico	2–1	Win	Friendly
2.	7 December 1969	Stade Municipal, Luxembourg City, Luxembourg	Bulgaria	1–3	Loss	1970 FIFA World Cup qualification
3.	1 May 1975	Stade Municipal, Luxembourg City, Luxembourg	Wales	1–3	Loss	UEFA Euro 1976 qualifying
4.	15 October 1975	Praterstadion, Vienna, Austria	Austria	6–2	Loss	UEFA Euro 1976 qualifying
Correct as of 7 October 2015

== Honours (as a player) ==
- Luxembourg National Division: 2

1969, 1984

- Luxembourg Cup: 1

1984
