= Ady Schmit =

Luxembourgish footballer and manager

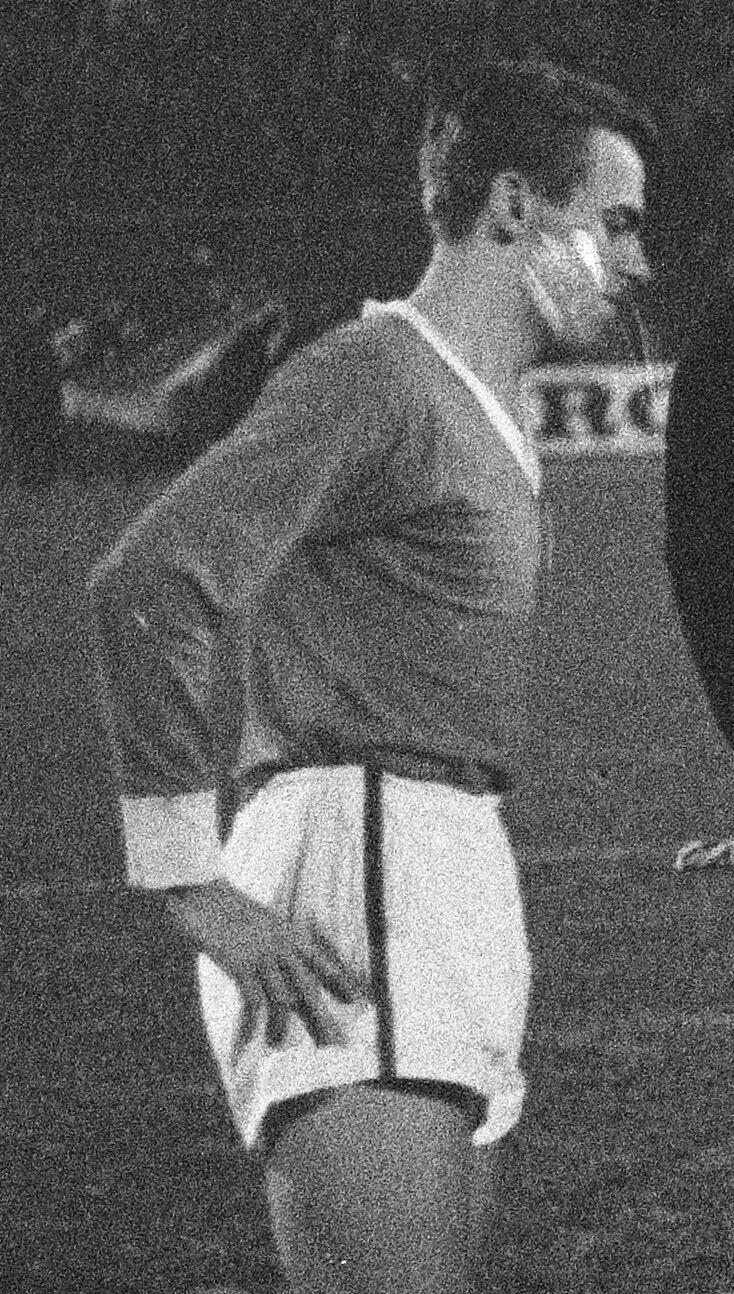
- Ady Schmit captaining Luxembourg before the game against Denmark on 18 December 1963

Personal information
- Full name: Adolphe Schmit
- Date of birth: 17 August 1940 (age 86)
- Place of birth: Luxembourg City, Luxembourg
- Height: 1.72 m (5 ft 8 in)
- Position: Midfielder

Senior career*
Years	Team	Apps	(Gls)
–1962	Fola Esch		
1962–1970	Sochaux	245	(52)
1970–1973	Mulhouse	82	(4)
1973–1975	Épinal		

International career
1960–1970	Luxembourg	49	(6)

Managerial career
- 1974–1975: Épinal
- * Club domestic league appearances and goals

Adolphe Schmit (born 17 August 1940), known as Ady Schmit, is a Luxembourgish former footballer. Schmit played most of his career in France. He scored three of his six goals for the Luxembourg national team on 8 October 1961 during a 4–2 win in a World Cup qualifying match versus Portugal, where Eusébio debuted in the national side.
