= Johny Léonard =

Luxemburgian footballer

Jean Léonard
Personal information
- Date of birth: 3 October 1941
- Place of birth: Differdange, Luxembourg
- Height: 1.85 m (6 ft 1 in)
- Position: Striker

Senior career*
Years	Team	Apps	(Gls)
1962–1967	US Luxembourg		
1967–1969	Metz	65	(29)
1969–1972	K.A.A. Gent	58	(30)
1976–1977	Sportive Thionville		
1976–1977	US Luxembourg		

International career
1962–1970	Luxembourg	32	(8)
- * Club domestic league appearances and goals

Johny Léonard (born 3 October 1941) was a Luxembourgish footballer who played as a striker.

== Club career ==
Léonard played for US Luxembourg, Metz and K.A.A. Gent.

== International career ==
A striker, Léonard won 32 caps for Luxembourg over a period of eight years, and scored eight goals in the process.
