= List of international goals scored by Robbie Keane =

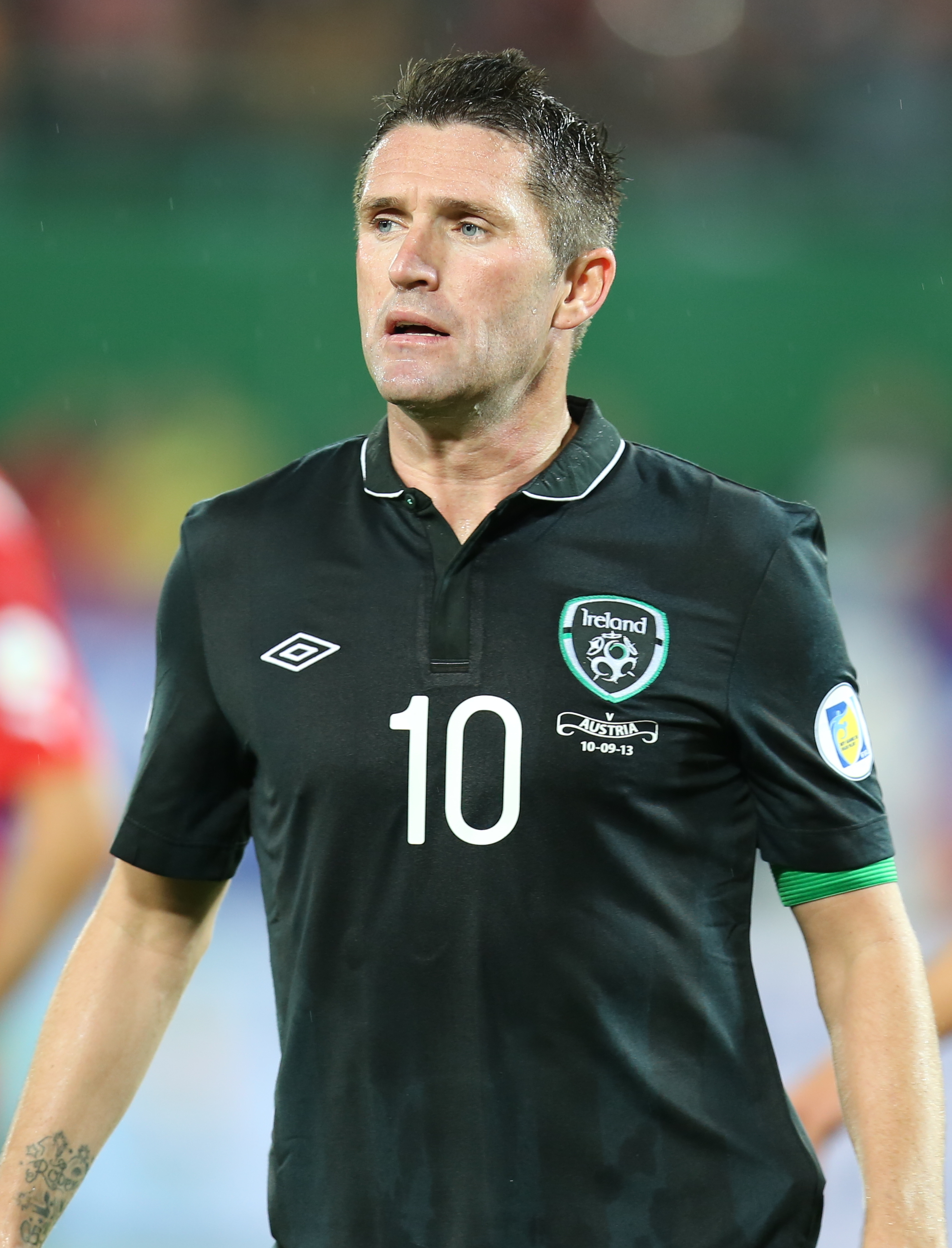
Robbie Keane (pictured in 2013) is the Republic of Ireland's most prolific scorer.

Robbie Keane is an Irish former professional footballer who is the Republic of Ireland national football team's top scorer, with 68 goals in 146 appearances. Keane made his international debut in a 2–1 defeat against the Czech Republic in March 1998, and scored his first international goals on his fifth appearance, a UEFA Euro 2000 qualifying 5–0 victory over Malta. He became Ireland's all-time leading scorer in October 2004, when he scored twice against the Faroe Islands during the qualification for the 2006 FIFA World Cup, passing Niall Quinn's record of 21 goals in 91 games. In June 2013, Keane also became Ireland's most capped player on his 126th appearance, in a 2014 FIFA World Cup qualification match against the Faroes. He is one of six Republic of Ireland players with 100 or more caps and has also captained his national team over 50 times.

Keane has scored three international hat-tricks, the first coming against San Marino in November 2006. His second hat-trick came in June 2013, against the Faroes, while his third was against Gibraltar in October 2014. The latter made Keane the highest scorer in the history of UEFA European Championship qualifying competitions, with 21 goals, overtaking the previous record holder, Hakan Şükür of Turkey. Keane is also one of twelve players to have scored in three consecutive World Cup matches; he scored one goal each against Germany and Saudi Arabia in the group stage, and against Spain in the knockout stage of the 2002 FIFA World Cup.

Keane has scored more goals against the Faroes and Gibraltar (five) than against any other national team. More than half of his goals (41) were scored in home fixtures, played in three venues: Lansdowne Road, Croke Park and Aviva Stadium.

Keane played his final match for the Republic of Ireland in August 2016, in a 4–0 victory over Oman, in a friendly at the Aviva Stadium, Dublin, scoring once with his 68th and final international goal for his country.

== International goals ==
Scores and results list Republic of Ireland's goals first. Score column indicates score after each Keane goal.

International goals scored by Robbie Keane
No.	Cap	Date	Venue	Opponent	Score	Result	Competition	Ref.
1	5	14 October 1998	Lansdowne Road, Dublin, Ireland	Malta	1–0	5–0	UEFA Euro 2000 qualifying	
2	5	14 October 1998	Lansdowne Road, Dublin, Ireland	Malta	2–0	5–0	UEFA Euro 2000 qualifying	
3	10	1 September 1999	Lansdowne Road, Dublin, Ireland	FR Yugoslavia	1–0	2–1	UEFA Euro 2000 qualifying	
4	11	8 September 1999	Ta' Qali National Stadium, Mdina, Malta	Malta	1–0	3–2	UEFA Euro 2000 qualifying	
5	13	13 November 1999	Lansdowne Road, Dublin, Ireland	Turkey	1–0	1–1	UEFA Euro 2000 qualifying	
6	14	23 February 2000	Lansdowne Road, Dublin, Ireland	Czech Republic	3–2	3–2	Friendly	
7	19	2 September 2000	Amsterdam Arena, Amsterdam, Netherlands	Netherlands	1–0	2–2	2002 FIFA World Cup qualification	
8	28	10 November 2001	Lansdowne Road, Dublin, Ireland	Iran	2–0	2–0	2002 FIFA World Cup qualification	
9	30	13 February 2002	Lansdowne Road, Dublin, Ireland	Russia	2–0	2–0	Friendly	
10	31	27 March 2002	Lansdowne Road, Dublin, Ireland	Denmark	2–0	3–0	Friendly	
11	35	5 June 2002	Kashima Soccer Stadium, Kashima, Ibaraki, Japan	Germany	1–1	1–1	2002 FIFA World Cup	
12	36	11 June 2002	International Stadium, Yokohama, Japan	Saudi Arabia	1–0	3–0	2002 FIFA World Cup	
13	37	16 June 2002	Suwon World Cup Stadium, Suwon, South Korea	Spain	1–1	1–1	2002 FIFA World Cup	
14	38	21 August 2002	Helsinki Olympic Stadium, Helsinki, Finland	Finland	2–0	3–0	Friendly	
15	43	7 June 2003	Lansdowne Road, Dublin, Ireland	Albania	1–0	2–1	UEFA Euro 2004 qualifying	
16	44	11 June 2003	Lansdowne Road, Dublin, Ireland	Georgia	2–0	2–0	UEFA Euro 2004 qualifying	
17	47	18 November 2003	Lansdowne Road, Dublin, Ireland	Canada	2–0	3–0	Friendly	
18	47	18 November 2003	Lansdowne Road, Dublin, Ireland	Canada	3–0	3–0	Friendly	
19	49	31 March 2004	Lansdowne Road, Dublin, Ireland	Czech Republic	2–1	2–1	Friendly	
20	52	5 June 2004	Amsterdam Arena, Amsterdam, Netherlands	Netherlands	1–0	1–0	Friendly	
21	53	4 September 2004	Lansdowne Road, Dublin, Ireland	Cyprus	3–0	3–0	2006 FIFA World Cup qualification	
22	56	13 October 2004	Lansdowne Road, Dublin, Ireland	Faroe Islands	1–0	2–0	2006 FIFA World Cup qualification	
23	56	13 October 2004	Lansdowne Road, Dublin, Ireland	Faroe Islands	2–0	2–0	2006 FIFA World Cup qualification	
24	57	16 November 2004	Lansdowne Road, Dublin, Ireland	Croatia	1–0	1–0	Friendly	
25	61	4 June 2005	Lansdowne Road, Dublin, Ireland	Israel	2–0	2–2	2006 FIFA World Cup qualification	
26	65	1 March 2006	Lansdowne Road, Dublin, Ireland	Sweden	2–0	3–0	Friendly	
27	70	15 November 2006	Lansdowne Road, Dublin, Ireland	San Marino	3–0	5–0	UEFA Euro 2008 qualifying	
28	70	15 November 2006	Lansdowne Road, Dublin, Ireland	San Marino	4–0	5–0	UEFA Euro 2008 qualifying	
29	70	15 November 2006	Lansdowne Road, Dublin, Ireland	San Marino	5–0	5–0	UEFA Euro 2008 qualifying	
30	73	22 August 2007	NRGi Park, Aarhus, Denmark	Denmark	1–0	4–0	Friendly	
31	73	22 August 2007	NRGi Park, Aarhus, Denmark	Denmark	2–0	4–0	Friendly	
32	78	11 November 2007	Millennium Stadium, Cardiff, Wales	Wales	1–1	2–2	UEFA Euro 2008 qualifying	
33	81	29 May 2008	Craven Cottage, London, England	Colombia	1–0	1–0	Friendly	
34	82	20 August 2008	Ullevaal Stadion, Oslo, Norway	Norway	1–0	1–1	Friendly	
35	85	15 October 2008	Croke Park, Dublin, Ireland	Cyprus	1–0	1–0	2010 FIFA World Cup qualification	
36	86	11 February 2009	Croke Park, Dublin, Ireland	Georgia	1–1	2–1	2010 FIFA World Cup qualification	
37	86	11 February 2009	Croke Park, Dublin, Ireland	Georgia	2–1	2–1	2010 FIFA World Cup qualification	
38	88	1 April 2009	Stadio San Nicola, Bari, Italy	Italy	1–1	1–1	2010 FIFA World Cup qualification	
39	89	29 May 2009	Craven Cottage, London, England	Nigeria	1–1	1–1	Friendly	
40	92	5 September 2009	GSP Stadium, Nicosia, Cyprus	Cyprus	2–1	2–1	2010 FIFA World Cup qualification	
41	96	18 November 2009	Stade de France, Saint-Denis, France	France	1–0	1–1	2010 FIFA World Cup qualification	
42	99	28 May 2010	RDS Arena, Dublin, Ireland	Algeria	2–0	3–0	Friendly	
43	99	28 May 2010	RDS Arena, Dublin, Ireland	Algeria	3–0	3–0	Friendly	
44	102	7 September 2010	Aviva Stadium, Dublin, Ireland	Andorra	3–1	3–1	UEFA Euro 2012 qualifying	
45	103	8 October 2010	Aviva Stadium, Dublin, Ireland	Russia	1–3	2–3	UEFA Euro 2012 qualifying	
46	105	26 March 2011	Aviva Stadium, Dublin, Ireland	Macedonia	2–0	2–1	UEFA Euro 2012 qualifying	
47	106	24 May 2011	Aviva Stadium, Dublin, Ireland	Northern Ireland	2–0	5–0	Nations Cup	
48	106	24 May 2011	Aviva Stadium, Dublin, Ireland	Northern Ireland	4–0	5–0	Nations Cup	
49	107	29 May 2011	Aviva Stadium, Dublin, Ireland	Scotland	1–0	1–0	Nations Cup	
50	108	4 June 2011	Philip II Arena, Skopje, Macedonia	North Macedonia	1–0	2–0	UEFA Euro 2012 qualifying	
51	108	4 June 2011	Philip II Arena, Skopje, Macedonia	North Macedonia	2–0	2–0	UEFA Euro 2012 qualifying	
52	113	11 November 2011	A. Le Coq Arena, Tallinn, Estonia	Estonia	3–0	4–0	UEFA Euro 2012 qualifying	
53	113	11 November 2011	A. Le Coq Arena, Tallinn, Estonia	Estonia	4–0	4–0	UEFA Euro 2012 qualifying	
54	121	9 September 2012	Astana Arena, Astana, Kazakhstan	Kazakhstan	1–1	2–1	2014 FIFA World Cup qualification	
55	125	2 June 2013	Aviva Stadium, Dublin, Ireland	Georgia	3–0	4–0	Friendly	
56	125	2 June 2013	Aviva Stadium, Dublin, Ireland	Georgia	4–0	4–0	Friendly	
57	126	7 June 2013	Aviva Stadium, Dublin, Ireland	Faroe Islands	1–0	3–0	2014 FIFA World Cup qualification	
58	126	7 June 2013	Aviva Stadium, Dublin, Ireland	Faroe Islands	2–0	3–0	2014 FIFA World Cup qualification	
59	126	7 June 2013	Aviva Stadium, Dublin, Ireland	Faroe Islands	3–0	3–0	2014 FIFA World Cup qualification	
60	128	6 September 2013	Aviva Stadium, Dublin, Ireland	Sweden	1–0	1–2	2014 FIFA World Cup qualification	
61	130	15 October 2013	Aviva Stadium, Dublin, Ireland	Kazakhstan	1–0	3–1	2014 FIFA World Cup qualification	
62	131	15 November 2013	Aviva Stadium, Dublin, Ireland	Latvia	1–0	3–0	Friendly	
63	136	11 October 2014	Aviva Stadium, Dublin, Ireland	Gibraltar	1–0	7–0	UEFA Euro 2016 qualifying	
64	136	11 October 2014	Aviva Stadium, Dublin, Ireland	Gibraltar	2–0	7–0	UEFA Euro 2016 qualifying	
65	136	11 October 2014	Aviva Stadium, Dublin, Ireland	Gibraltar	3–0	7–0	UEFA Euro 2016 qualifying	
66	141	4 September 2015	Estádio Algarve, Faro, Portugal	Gibraltar	2–0	4–0	UEFA Euro 2016 qualifying	
67	141	4 September 2015	Estádio Algarve, Faro, Portugal	Gibraltar	3–0	4–0	UEFA Euro 2016 qualifying	
68	146	31 August 2016	Aviva Stadium, Dublin, Ireland	Oman	2–0	4–0	Friendly	

== Hat-tricks ==
No.	Opponent	Goals	Score	Venue	Competition	Date
1	San Marino	3 – (3–0', 4–0', 5–0')	5–0	Lansdowne Road, Dublin, Ireland	UEFA Euro 2008 qualifying	15 November 2006
2	Faroe Islands	3 – (1–0', 2–0', 3–0')	3–0	Aviva Stadium, Dublin, Ireland	2014 FIFA World Cup qualification	7 June 2013
3	Gibraltar	3 – (1–0', 2–0', 3–0')	7–0	Aviva Stadium, Dublin, Ireland	UEFA Euro 2016 qualifying	11 October 2014

== Statistics ==
Goals and appearances by year
Year	Apps	Goals
1998	5	2
1999	8	3
2000	9	2
2001	7	1
2002	11	6
2003	7	4
2004	10	6
2005	7	1
2006	6	4
2007	8	3
2008	7	3
2009	11	6
2010	8	4
2011	10	8
2012	8	1
2013	9	8
2014	7	3
2015	5	2
2016	3	1
Total	146	68

Goals and appearances by competition
Competition	Apps	Goals
UEFA European Championship qualification	44	23
UEFA European Championship tournaments	5	0
Friendlies	51	21
FIFA World Cup qualification	37	18
FIFA World Cup tournaments	4	3
Other tournaments	5	3
Total	146	68

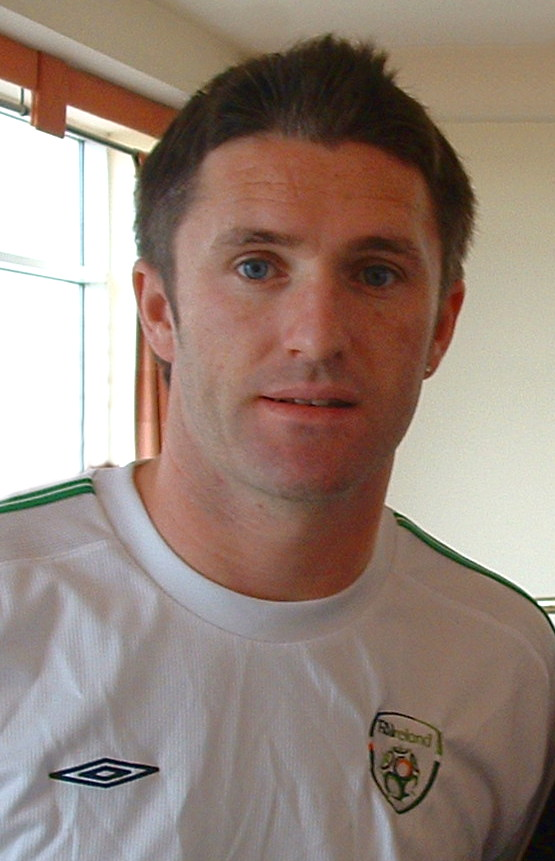
Keane has scored more goals in UEFA European Championship qualifying competitions than any other player.

National team statistics
FIFA caps	FIFA goals	Non-FIFA caps	Non-FIFA goals	Total caps	Total goals
165	63	3	5	168	68

== See also ==
- List of Republic of Ireland national football team hat-tricks
- List of top international men's association football goal scorers by country
- List of men's footballers with 50 or more international goals
