= Republic of Ireland national football team =

Men's national association football team

Republic of Ireland
- Nickname(s): The Boys in Green (Irish: Na buachaillí i nglas)
- Association: Football Association of Ireland (FAI)
- Confederation: UEFA (Europe)
- Head coach: Heimir Hallgrímsson
- Captain: Nathan Collins
- Most caps: Robbie Keane (146)
- Top scorer: Robbie Keane (68)
- Home stadium: Aviva Stadium
- FIFA code: IRL
First colours	Second colours

FIFA ranking
- Current: 56 (18 November 2026)
- Highest: 6 (August 1993)
- Lowest: 70 (June–July 2014)

First international
- Irish Free State 1–0 Bulgaria (Colombes, France; 28 May 1924)

Biggest win
- Republic of Ireland 8–0 Malta (Dublin, Ireland; 16 November 1983)

Biggest defeat
- Brazil 7–0 Republic of Ireland (Uberlândia, Brazil; 27 May 1982)

World Cup
- Appearances: 3 (first in 1990, last in 2002)
- Best result: Quarter-finals (1990)

European Championship
- Appearances: 3 (first in 1988)
- Best result: Final 8 (1988) (Note: The team also reached the 1964 quarter finals, but unlike 1988 only the top 4 played in the finals tournament. The only finals tournament knockout stage the team has reached was the 2016 round of 16)
- Website: www.fai.ie

The Republic of Ireland national football team (Irish: Foireann peile náisiúnta Phoblacht na hÉireann) represents Ireland in men's international football. It is governed by the Football Association of Ireland (FAI).

The team made their debut at the 1924 Summer Olympics, reaching the quarter-finals. Between 1924 and 1936, the team competed as the Irish Free State and from then until 1950, it was referred to by the FAI as Éire or Ireland. During the same period, another team named "Ireland" existed; this was overseen by the Irish Football Association (IFA) and had previously been the sole national team for the entire island of Ireland. In 1953, FIFA decreed that for competitive matches in tournaments that both Irish teams could enter, the FAI team would be officially called Republic of Ireland while the IFA team was to be named Northern Ireland. Northern Ireland was allowed to keep using the title Ireland by FIFA in the British Home Championship (which was discontinued in 1984). The Republic of Ireland was the first nation from outside the United Kingdom to defeat England at home, in a match played at Goodison Park, Liverpool, in 1949. The team reached the quarter-final stage of the 1964 European Nations' Cup, where they lost to the eventual champions Spain.

Under the guidance of Jack Charlton, the team enjoyed their most successful era, reaching their highest FIFA world ranking ever at sixth in August 1993, and qualifying for UEFA Euro 1988 in their first appearance at the UEFA European Championship, reaching the quarter-finals of the 1990 FIFA World Cup in their first appearance at the finals, as well as making the last 16 at the 1994 edition. Charlton's successor Mick McCarthy lost out on the next two major tournaments but ultimately qualified for the 2002 World Cup, making it to the last 16, a feat repeated at the 2016 Euros by manager Martin O'Neill.

The team's home stadium is the Aviva Stadium, in Dublin, although some of their home games have been played in other stadiums across the country. Their traditional colours are green shirts and white shorts. The position of manager is currently filled by Heimir Hallgrímsson, while Nathan Collins has served as team captain since 2025.

== History ==
=== 1920s–1980s ===
Between 1882 and 1924, Ireland was represented by a single national football team organised by the Belfast-based Irish Football Association (IFA). In 1920, Ireland was partitioned into Northern Ireland and the Irish Free State. The Dublin-based organisation calling itself the Football Association of the Irish Free State (FAIFS) split from the IFA in 1921 and began organising its own league and national football team. In 1923, the FAIFS was recognised by FIFA as the governing body of football in the Irish Free State.

The Irish Free State made their international debut at the 1924 Summer Olympics. On 28 May, at the Stade Olympique, they beat Bulgaria 1–0, with Paddy Duncan scoring the team's first-ever goal. As a result, they qualified for the quarter-finals where they lost to the Netherlands. On 14 June 1924, the Irish Free State made their home debut against the United States, who had embarked on a brief European tour after competing in the same Summer Olympics. Ed Brookes scored a hat-trick in a 3–1 home win at Dalymount Park.

The Irish Free State did not play their next game until 21 March 1926, an away game against Italy lost 3–0. In subsequent years, the status of the Olympic Games football competition was downgraded and as a result, this game is widely regarded as the Irish Free State's first official game. On 25 February 1934, the Irish Free State made their FIFA World Cup debut, drawing 4–4 with Belgium at Dalymount Park in a 1934 FIFA World Cup qualifier. Paddy Moore scored all four of the Free State's goals and became the first player ever to score four goals in a World Cup game.

After 1936, they reverted to the designation Football Association of Ireland (FAI) and began to refer to their team as Éire or "Ireland". During this entire period, there were two Irish international football teams, chosen by two rival Associations. Both Associations, the Northern Ireland-based IFA and the Irish Free State-based FAI claimed jurisdiction over the whole of Ireland and considered themselves entitled to select players from the entire island. At least 38 dual internationals were selected to represent both teams, however the overwhelming majority of these were Southerners who also agreed to play for the IFA team, with only a bare handful "crossing the border" in the other direction.

A 2–0 win over England at Goodison Park on 21 September 1949 was the first time England suffered a home defeat by a team outside the Home Countries of Scotland, Wales and the Ireland team run by the Belfast-based Irish FA. FIFA eventually intervened when both teams entered 1950 World Cup qualification, the first time they had entered the same competition. Four players – Tom Aherne, Reg Ryan, Davy Walsh, Con Martin – actually played for the two different teams in the same FIFA World Cup tournament. All four players concerned had been born in the Irish Free State and made their full international debut in FAI colours before agreeing to represent the IFA team. This may have alarmed the FAI since they subsequently lobbied FIFA to prevent the IFA from picking Southern-born players (as well as attempting to exert pressure on the players themselves, sometimes through their clubs). FIFA's response was to restrict the eligibility of players on the basis of the (political) border, further ruling in 1953 that neither team could be referred to as Ireland in competitions which both teams were eligible to enter; i.e., initially the FIFA World Cup and subsequently the European Nations Cup (now the UEFA European Football Championship). FIFA decreed that the FAI team officially be called the Republic of Ireland while the IFA team was to be named Northern Ireland.

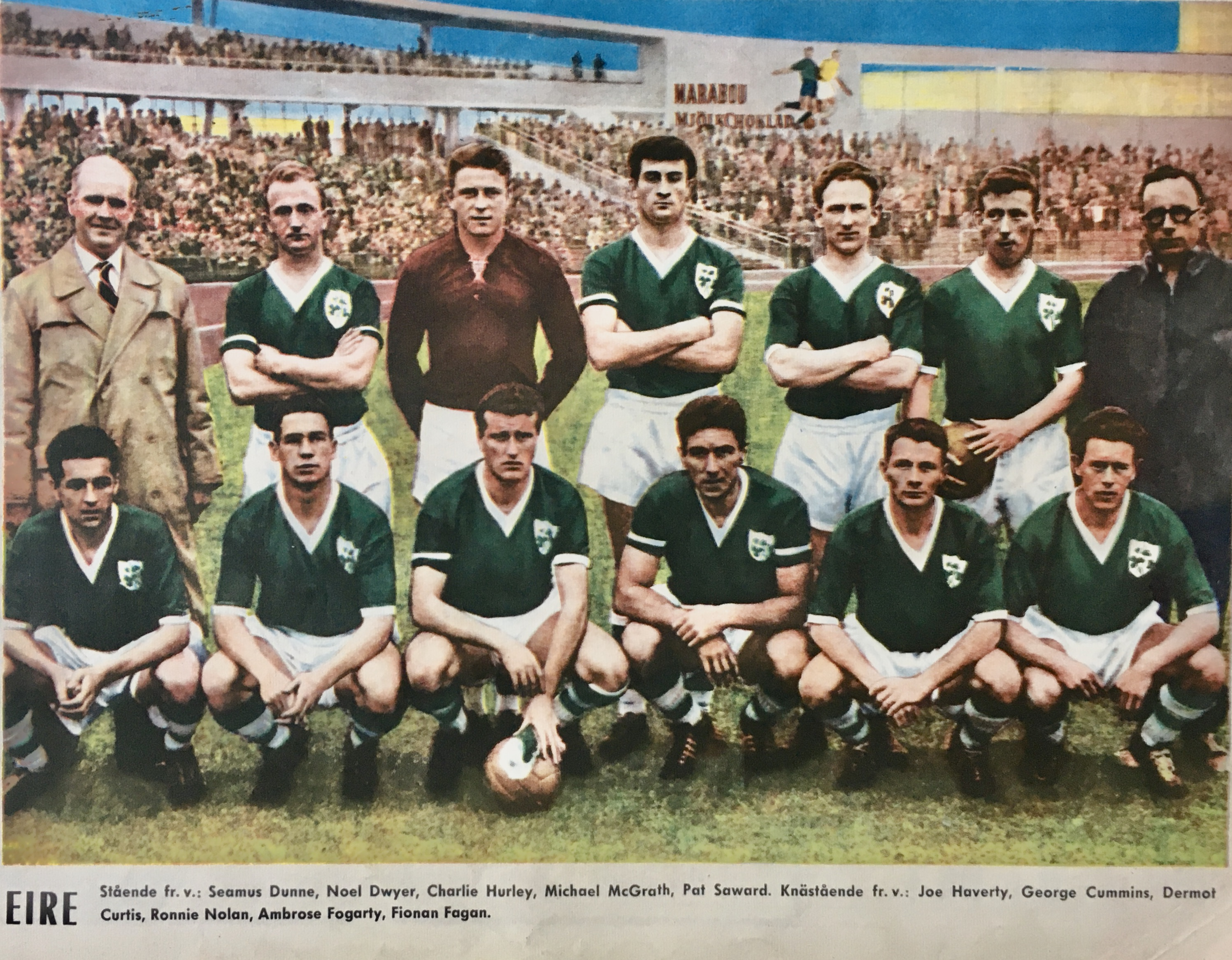
The Republic of Ireland national team had a match at Malmö Stadion against Sweden in May 1960 – players of the team from left to right, standing; Seamus Dunne, Noel Dwyer, Charlie Hurley. Michael McGrath, Pat Saward; crouched: Joe Haverty, George Cummins, Dermot Curtis, Ronnie Nolan, Ambrose "Amby" Fogarty and Fionan "Paddy" Fagan.

The 1958 World Cup qualifiers saw the Republic of Ireland drawn with England. In their home game against England, Alf Ringstead put the hosts 1–0 up before John Atyeo equalised in the last minute to salvage a 1–1 draw for England. Under the rules of the day, a win for the Republic of Ireland would have meant a play-off with England for a place in the World Cup.

After reaching the quarter-finals of the 1964 European Nations' Cup, the Republic of Ireland was drawn to face Spain and Syria in 1966 World Cup qualifying. Despite Syria's withdrawal, this was still considered a qualifying group with the Irish winning 1–0 at home and losing 4–1 away. This meant a play-off at the Parc des Princes in Paris, which Spain won 1–0 Eamon Dunphy made his Ireland debut in this game. The play-off was originally scheduled to take place at Wembley Stadium in London, home to a large Irish diaspora, but the FAI agreed with the Royal Spanish Football Federation to have the match moved to Paris, where a large Spanish diaspora lived. The FAI was criticised for this move to boost revenue from gate receipts.

In 1965, the Republic of Ireland team made history when selecting Manchester United full-back Shay Brennan for the senior national team. This was the first instance of a player born outside the Republic being selected to play for the national team due to having an Irish parent. Since then, many of the Republic's most prominent players have been born in England, including Mark Lawrenson, David O'Leary, John Aldridge, Tony Cascarino and David Kelly. A number of players born in Scotland, including Ray Houghton, have since represented the Republic due to having Irish parentage. The selection rules were later relaxed to allow for the selection of players with an Irish grandparent.

In 1969, the FAI appointed Mick Meagan as the first permanent manager of the national side. His two years in charge were marked by exceptionally poor results, however with the team losing five out of six matches and gaining just one point in their 1970 World Cup qualification, and doing no better in the UEFA Euro 1972 qualifiers, leading to his dismissal. His replacement, Liam Tuohy, did a somewhat better in the 1974 qualification, and more importantly, oversaw major improvements to the national team's training facilities and persuaded many English club sides to end their policies of not releasing Irish players for international games during the domestic season. Ultimately, however, the team still failed to qualify for the World Cup, and Tuohy resigned following a dispute over his wages. Johnny Giles became the side's first player-manager in the 1970s. This was followed by the debut of a young Liam Brady and results improved markedly. The side missed out on the 1978 World Cup by two points, having defeated France at home during qualification. After a less than impressive performance at Euro 1980 qualifying, in which the team finished well behind group winners England and Northern Ireland, Giles resigned, saying that he had taken the national side as far as he could.

Eoin Hand took over as manager for the 1982 World Cup qualifiers, and once more the Republic of Ireland narrowly missed out on qualification, this time on goal difference behind France, whom they had defeated at home once more. Disappointing qualifying campaigns for both Euro 1984 and the 1986 World Cup followed, ending Hand's time in charge.

=== 1986–1995: Success under Jack Charlton ===
In 1986, the Republic of Ireland appointed Jack Charlton, a top rated English manager who had been part of England's World Cup-winning side of 1966. During the 1970s, he had developed Middlesbrough into a side which provided many players to the dominant Liverpool team of the time.

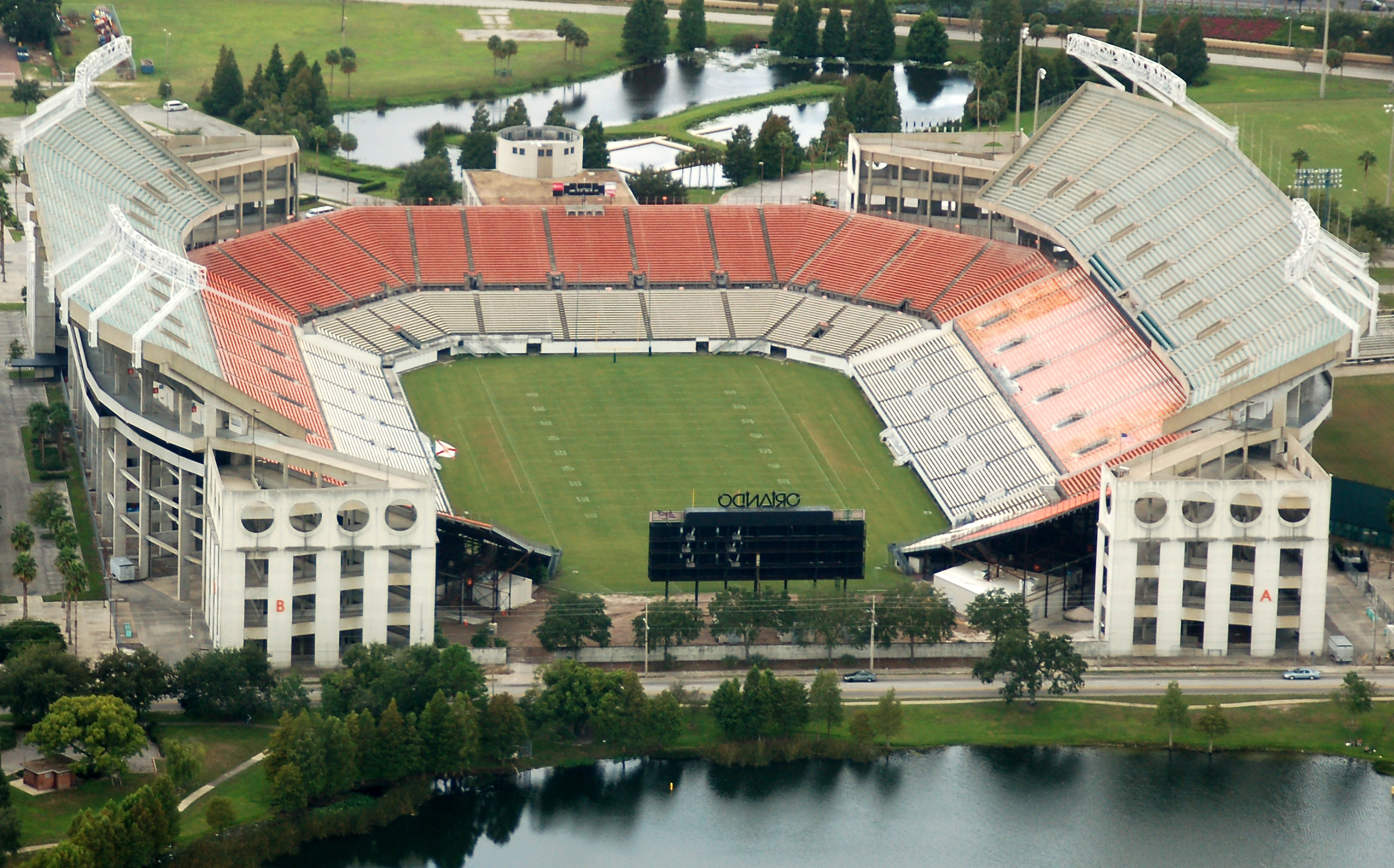
The Republic of Ireland played against the Netherlands at the Citrus Bowl in Orlando, Florida, where they were eliminated from the 1994 FIFA World Cup after losing 2-0

After taking charge of the Republic of Ireland, Charlton influenced changes in the national side which resulted in the most successful period of its history, qualifying for two World Cups and a European Championship. Prominent players in this period included Paul McGrath, Packie Bonner, Niall Quinn, and the Liverpool trio of Ray Houghton, John Aldridge and Ronnie Whelan.

Ireland's first appearance at a major finals tournament came in Euro 1988. With Ireland's fixtures already complete, qualification was secured through Gary Mackay's 87th-minute goal in Sofia when Scotland beat Bulgaria 1–0; the Scottish win left Ireland top of the group. In spite of the enforced absence of Liam Brady and Mark Lawrenson from their squad, in the finals in West Germany, Ireland shocked Europe by beating England 1–0 in Stuttgart with a header from Ray Houghton in their competitive debut; drew 1–1 with the Soviet Union in Hannover, with Ronnie Whelan the scorer; and lost to eventual champions the Netherlands 1–0 in Gelsenkirchen, coming within seven minutes of a draw that would have meant a semi-final place.

The Republic of Ireland's longest competitive winning streak was achieved in 1989 during the 1990 World Cup qualifying campaign. Five games against Spain, Northern Ireland, Hungary, and Malta twice, were all wins. Subsequently, the side made it to the 1990 World Cup in Italy. Three draws in the group stage against England, Egypt and the Netherlands were enough to make the knockout stage. Virtually the entire country watched as they beat Romania on penalties, with Packie Bonner making a vital save and David O'Leary scoring the decisive spot-kick. Ireland was then beaten 1–0 by hosts Italy in the quarter-final at the Stadio Olimpico in Rome. During the tournament, the team had an audience with Pope John Paul II, the only team to do so.

After missing out on Euro 1992 (despite being unbeaten in qualifying), the Republic of Ireland qualified for the 1994 World Cup, held in the United States, via a qualification group which again included Spain and Northern Ireland, and ended with the Republic finishing above European champions Denmark by a very narrow margin (goals scored). In their first match at the 1994 finals, they beat the previous World Cup hosts and third-place finishers, Italy, 1–0 in their opening game at Giants Stadium just outside New York City, but lost to Mexico 2–1 at the Citrus Bowl in the heat and humidity of Orlando, Florida. They ended the group stage with a 0–0 draw with Norway at Giants Stadium, in East Rutherford, New Jersey. With these results, they made it to the second round, eventually losing 2–0 to the Netherlands in Orlando.

Ireland finished second behind Portugal in Euro 1996 qualifying's Group 6, but narrowly missed out on the Euro 1996 finals after losing 2–0 to the Netherlands in the qualifying play-off. Anfield in Liverpool was chosen as the neutral venue for the match between the two worst-ranked group runners-up, with Patrick Kluivert scoring both goals to send his team through. It was Jack Charlton's final game as manager.

=== 1996–2007: Mick McCarthy, Kerr, Staunton ===
Charlton was replaced by Mick McCarthy but Ireland still missed out on the next two major tournaments. Ireland just managed to finish second to Romania in their 1998 World Cup qualification campaign after Tony Cascarino scored a late goal to win the away match with Lithuania. A play-off with Belgium followed, with the match at Lansdowne Road finishing in a 1–1 draw, the match in Belgium finishing 2–1 to the home team and substitute David Connolly being sent off in the latter, preventing Ireland from progressing to the 1998 World Cup. FIFA awarded the FIFA Fair Play Award for 1997 to the Irish supporters "for their exemplary behaviour at Ireland team matches, especially the FIFA World Cup qualifying play-offs against Belgium". Ireland's opponents in UEFA Euro 2000 qualifying Group 8 were Yugoslavia, Croatia, Malta and North Macedonia (then known as FYRO Macedonia (see Macedonia naming dispute)). North Macedonia scored a last-minute equaliser that denied Ireland top spot in the group; instead, they faced Turkey in a play-off to decide which team would participate in Euro 2000. The match in Dublin finished in a 1–1 draw, although Turkey qualified through the away goals rule after a 0–0 draw, at the end of which Tony Cascarino became involved in a fight and retired from international football.

Ireland took on both Portugal and the Netherlands in 2002 World Cup qualifiers in UEFA's Group 2, ending the group in second place with 24 points from 10 matches (seven victories and three draws). Despite this unbeaten run, Ireland were drawn in a play-off with Iran. The match in Dublin finished in a 2–0 victory to Ireland with goals from Ian Harte (penalty) and Robbie Keane, while the match in Tehran, played in front of 100,000 spectators, finished in a 1–0 win for Iran. McCarthy thus managed to lead Ireland to the 2002 World Cup final stages, though only for the team to lose inspirational captain Roy Keane due to the pair's infamous public spat in Saipan. 1–1 draws with Cameroon and Germany were followed by a 3–0 victory over Saudi Arabia in Group E. The Irish once again progressed to the knockout stage, only losing narrowly 3–2 on penalties to Spain in Suwon after Robbie Keane's last minute equalising penalty kick forced the game into extra time.

After a poor start to qualifying for Euro 2004, McCarthy was replaced by Brian Kerr, but he too struggled to guide the side to the tournament or the subsequent 2006 World Cup in Germany, and was ultimately sacked in October 2005. Kerr was replaced by Steve Staunton (assisted by Bobby Robson in the position of "international football consultant") in January 2006. Under Staunton, results varied widely but the team still failed to qualify for Euro 2008 and Staunton lost the position in October 2007. His reign included a humiliating 5–2 defeat to Cyprus during the qualifiers' Group D, one of the worst defeats in the team's history.

=== 2008–2019: Trapattoni, O'Neill, and McCarthy's return ===
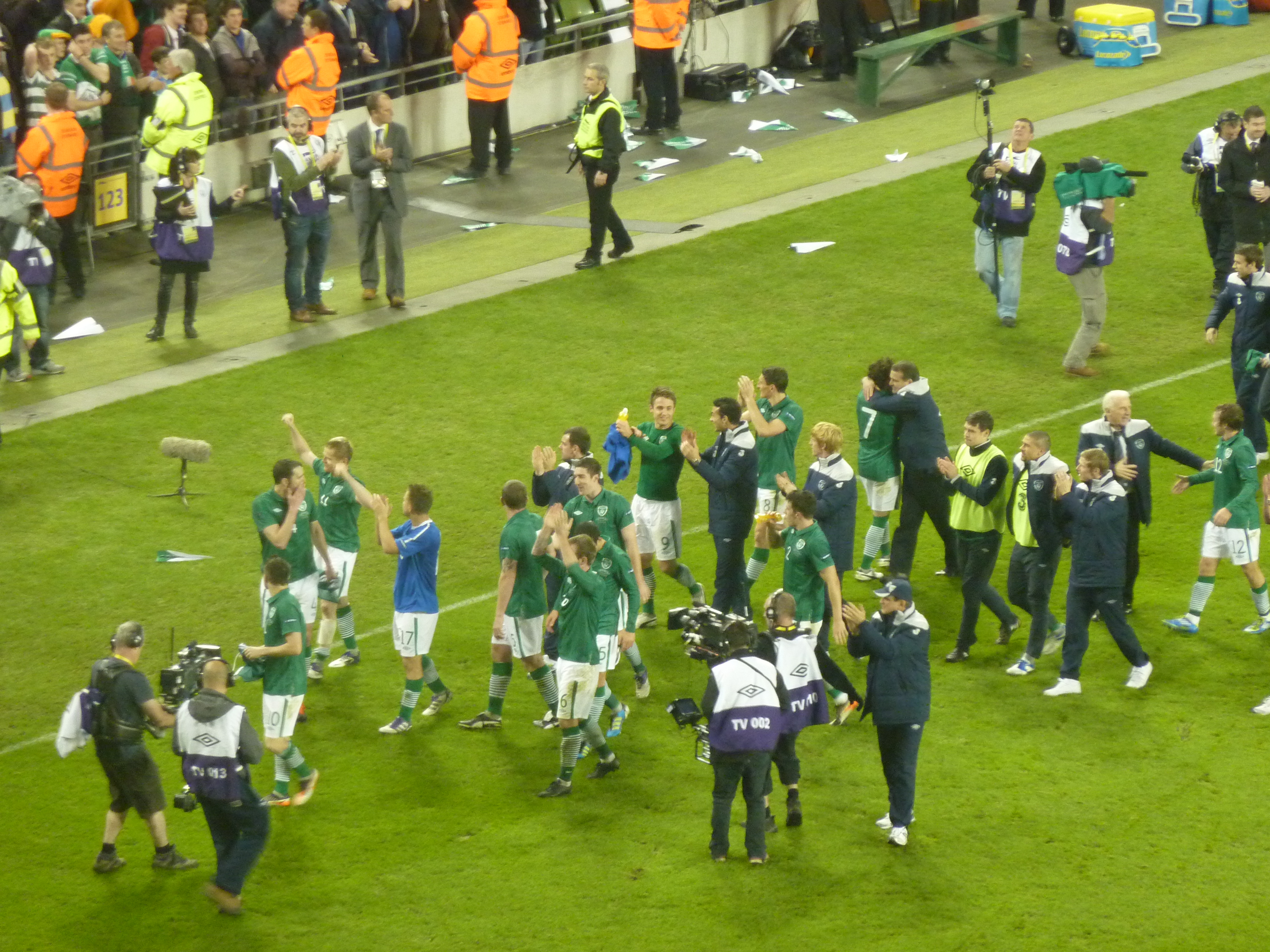
The Ireland players celebrating qualification for UEFA Euro 2012

Giovanni Trapattoni was appointed manager in February 2008 following a spell with assistant coach Don Givens in charge. Trapattoni went through all ten first round 2010 World Cup qualifying games unbeaten, winning four of the ten games. Ireland lost out on a place in the finals, however, after a controversial, narrow loss to France in the play-offs. Ireland went down 1–0 in the first leg, and lost 2–1 on aggregate, with William Gallas scoring a controversial goal in extra time in the second leg after Thierry Henry had handled the ball before crossing for Gallas to score. This followed another controversy over FIFA's last-minute decision to seed the play-off draw.

In 2011, Ireland hosted and won the inaugural Nations Cup with wins against Wales, Northern Ireland, and Scotland without conceding a goal.

In their Euro 2012 qualifying group, Ireland finished second, losing only the home fixture against Russia. They thus reached the play-offs and were drawn against Estonia, whom they beat 5–1 on aggregate. Euro 2012 was Ireland's first major tournament since 2002, but in Group C they lost all three matches, against Croatia, Spain, and Italy. UEFA, however, announced a special award for the fans of the Irish team, who notably sang in the last few minutes against Spain, despite trailing 4–0.

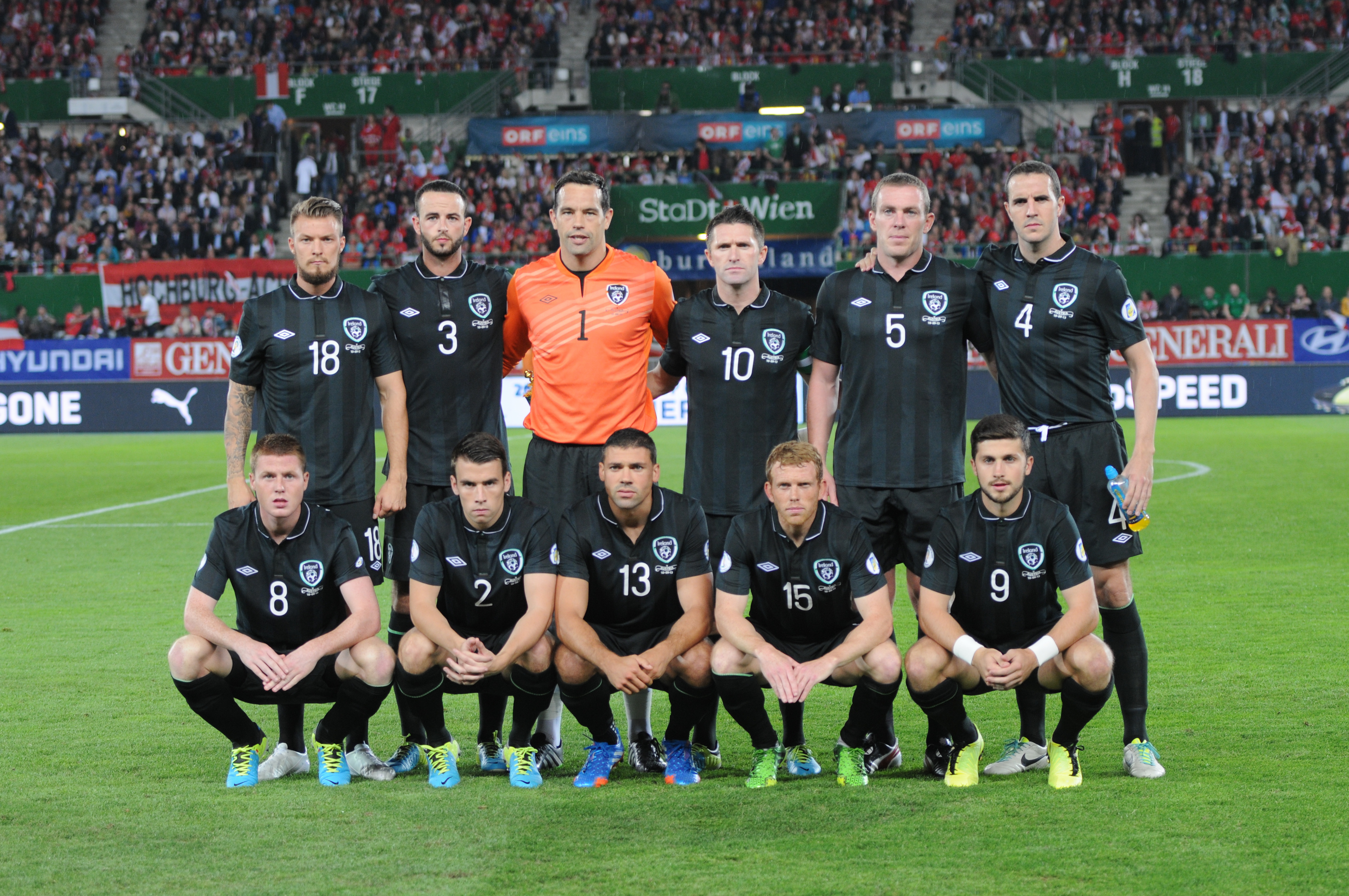
Irish team in September 2013

Ireland was drawn in Group C of UEFA's 2014 World Cup qualification alongside Germany, Sweden, Austria, the Faroe Islands and Kazakhstan. On 12 October, Ireland suffered their largest ever competitive home defeat, 6–1 against Germany, at the Aviva Stadium. Ireland then lost against Sweden and Austria in early September 2013, effectively ending the qualification campaign, and Giovanni Trapattoni resigned as team manager the following day. Noel King was appointed interim senior manager on 23 September 2013 following his resignation.

On 5 November 2013, the FAI announced that Martin O'Neill would be Trapattoni's replacement as manager, with former team captain Roy Keane as his assistant. They assumed their roles when the team met on 11 November where they won against Latvia 3–0 and drew against Poland 0–0.

For the Euro 2016 qualification phase, the Republic of Ireland was drawn in Group D against Georgia, Germany, Gibraltar, Poland and Scotland. The team played against Gibraltar for the first time, beating them 7–0, and achieved an away draw against World Cup champions, Germany, a few days later in October 2014.

On 8 October 2015, the Republic of Ireland beat world champions Germany 1–0 in a Euro 2016 qualifier at the Aviva Stadium. Shane Long scored the game's only goal with an excellent finish in the 70th minute, rewarding the Republic of Ireland's defensive display. The result, hailed as one of the Republic of Ireland's greatest, guaranteed the Republic of Ireland a play-off place at least, with hopes of automatic qualification still a reality going into the final group game against Poland in Warsaw. A win, or a draw of 2–2 or more, would guarantee at least second place in the group and ensure automatic qualification for the finals in France. The Republic of Ireland, however, lost 2–1, thus entering them into the play-offs.

The draw for the Euro 2016 Play-off was held in Nyon, Switzerland, on 18 October 2015. Ireland were unseeded in the draw, meaning they could face one of Bosnia and Herzegovina, Ukraine, Sweden or Hungary. Ireland were drawn against Bosnia and Herzegovina, the top seeded team in the play-off. The only previous meeting between the teams resulted in a 1–0 win for the Republic of Ireland in a friendly in 2012, Shane Long scoring the game's only goal. The first leg of the play-off was played in Bilino Polje Stadium. A goal from Robbie Brady for the Irish was followed when Edin Džeko equalised 1–1 to end off the match. In the second leg played at the Aviva Stadium, Jonathan Walters scored two goals leading to a 2–0 victory for the Irish. In the end, Ireland won the play-off 3–1 on aggregate, qualifying them for Euro 2016.

At the tournament's final stages in France, Ireland were drawn into Group E against Italy, Belgium and Sweden. In their opener at the Stade de France in Saint-Denis, Paris, Wes Hoolahan scored the opener with a spectacular half-volley off a Séamus Coleman cross, but Sweden equalised after Ciaran Clark headed into his own net attempting to clear a cross from Zlatan Ibrahimović, leading to a 1–1 draw. At the Nouveau Stade de Bordeaux against Belgium, the Belgians cruised to a 3–0 victory after two goals from Romelu Lukaku and one from Axel Witsel, leaving Ireland needing to win their final match against already qualified Italy to qualify for the knockout stage. Against Italy at the Stade Pierre-Mauroy in Villeneuve-d'Ascq, Lille, Ireland played strongly but were five minutes plus stoppage time away from elimination when Robbie Brady headed in Hoolahan's cross. The Republic held on to win 1–0, sending Ireland through as one of the four best third-place teams. On 26 June, Ireland played France in the round of 16 in Lyon. Ireland took the lead in the match with an early penalty from Robbie Brady, but France went on to win 2–1 to advance to the quarter-finals.

The 2018 World Cup qualification draw took place on 25 July 2015 when the team were drawn in Group D against Austria, Georgia, Moldova, Serbia and Wales. Ireland started qualifying with a 2–2 draw away to Serbia preceding victories over Georgia and Moldova.

On 12 November 2016, Ireland beat Austria in Vienna to go top of the 2018 World Cup qualifying group. However, a run of three draws against Wales, Austria and Georgia followed by a devastating 1–0 loss at home to Serbia looked to have diminished any chances of the Republic of Ireland qualifying for the 2018 World Cup. The Republic of Ireland were soon back on form however after securing a 2–0 victory at home to Moldova thanks to a brace from Daryl Murphy.

On 9 October 2017, Ireland defeated Wales 1–0 in Cardiff to qualify for the qualification play-offs after a James McClean goal fired Ireland to second place in the group. They went on to play Denmark in the play-offs.

In the first leg of the play-offs on 11 November, Ireland drew 0–0 against Denmark in Copenhagen. In the second leg on 14 November in Dublin, Ireland lost 5–1 to Denmark after taking the lead in the game. Shane Duffy's early header looked to have given the Republic of Ireland hope in qualifying for their first World Cup since 2002, however, an Andreas Christensen goal, a Christian Eriksen hat-trick and a late Nicklas Bendtner penalty shattered Irish dreams.

Ireland competed in the first UEFA Nations League from September to November in 2018 and went on to finish bottom of their group, picking up just two points in two 0–0 draws against Denmark and were relegated to League C for the 2020–21 UEFA Nations League.

On 21 November 2018, Martin O'Neill and Roy Keane left their posts with the Ireland senior team following a run of poor results.

The FAI confirmed on the weekend of 23 November 2018, Mick McCarthy's appointment as the Republic of Ireland manager after the 59-year-old agreed to return to the role following a meeting with chief executive John Delaney. McCarthy appointed Terry Connor as his assistant, who he had worked with at Wolverhampton Wanderers and Ipswich Town respectively. Ireland's record goalscorer Robbie Keane was announced as a member of the backroom team. He started poorly with an unconvincing 1–0 win over Gibraltar after having previously beaten them 7–0 and 4–0 in the past. However, a good performance against Georgia saw another 1–0 win thanks to a Conor Hourihane free kick. The wins left them top of the group, a position they still held three matches later in mid-September 2019, with just three matches remaining. Ireland failed to automatically qualify and were placed into a semi-final play-off against Slovakia.

=== 2020–2023: Stephen Kenny era ===
On 4 April 2020, amid the global COVID-19 pandemic, McCarthy stood down as manager and was immediately replaced by Stephen Kenny. On 3 September 2020, Ireland drew 1–1 away to Bulgaria in Kenny's first match as manager. The following month, Ireland played its postponed Euro 2020 semi-final play-off match against Slovakia. The match finished 0–0 after extra time and a 4–2 penalty shootout defeat saw Slovakia progress to the play-off final.

In March 2021, Ireland played two 2022 FIFA World Cup qualifiers; losing 3–2 away to Serbia before losing at home 1–0 to Luxembourg. Ireland would ultimately fail to qualify for the World Cup as they ended the campaign with a third-place finish in their group.

On 8 June 2021, Chiedozie Ogbene became the first African-born player to represent the Republic of Ireland, when he made his debut in a 0–0 draw away to Hungary.

In the UEFA Euro 2024 qualifying, Ireland was placed in Group B. After recording only two wins against Gibraltar, Ireland finished the group in fourth place behind France, the Netherlands and Greece, failing to qualify for the fourth tournament in a row.

In October 2023, the Republic of Ireland was confirmed as co-host of UEFA Euro 2028 alongside England, Scotland, Wales and Northern Ireland. However, due to the unusually high number of involved associations in the bid, Ireland was not granted automatic qualification to the tournament. Instead, all teams will participate in qualifying, with two spots allocated to the best performing hosts which are unable to qualify on merit. Northern Ireland withdrew as a host because of issues with the building of the nominated stadium at Casement Park in Belfast, and the games meant for that venue were allotted to the Republic of Ireland, who will host all the games at Aviva Stadium.

=== 2023–present ===
Stephen Kenny's contract was due to expire at the end of 2023, with the manager himself admitting after a friendly against New Zealand that while he would like to continue in the position, his "instinct [was] that’s not going to happen." The match was eventually confirmed to be his last, as the FAI announced on 22 November 2023 that Kenny's contract would not be renewed. While Kenny recorded only six wins in 29 competitive matches during his tenure and is widely considered as one of Ireland's worst managers in modern history, he was also credited with introducing younger players to the squad.

In the 2024–25 UEFA Nations League B, Ireland was drawn in Group 2 along with England, Finland and Greece.

On 10 July 2024, the Football Association of Ireland announced Heimir Hallgrímsson as the new coach of the Republic of Ireland national football team.

In September 2025, the Republic of Ireland opened their 2026 FIFA World Cup qualification campaign with a 2–2 draw at home to Hungary before losing 2–1 away to Armenia who were 105th in the FIFA World Rankings. On 13 November 2025, Ireland defeated Portugal 2–0 with both goals coming from Troy Parrott to remain in contention of qualifying for the World Cup. Three days later, in Irelands final group game in which they had to win, Parrott scored a hat-trick, including a 96th-minute winner, in a 3–2 win away to Hungary, securing Ireland's place in the 2026 FIFA World Cup play-offs. He became the first ever Republic of Ireland player to score a hat-trick in an away game and the first Irish player to score a competitive hat-trick since Robbie Keane in 2014. On 26 March 2026, the Republic of Ireland lost 4–3 on penalties after a 2–2 draw against Czechia in the 2026 FIFA World Cup qualification play-off semi-final.

==== Games against Israel ====
The Republic of Ireland defeated Israel 3–0 in a UEFA Nations League match in Debrecen, Hungary, on 27 September 2026. Before the match, the Irish players wore black armbands and bowed their heads during the Israeli national anthem; they did not participate in the customary pre-match handshakes or exchange of pennants. The Football Association of Ireland (FAI) said the armbands recognised lives lost in the Gaza conflict. Before the match, the Israeli Football Association stated that football should be kept separate from politics and said its players intended to take part in the usual pre-match formalities. Israel captain Manor Solomon said that some Irish players had made unpleasant remarks to Israeli players during the match.

== Team image ==
=== Kits ===
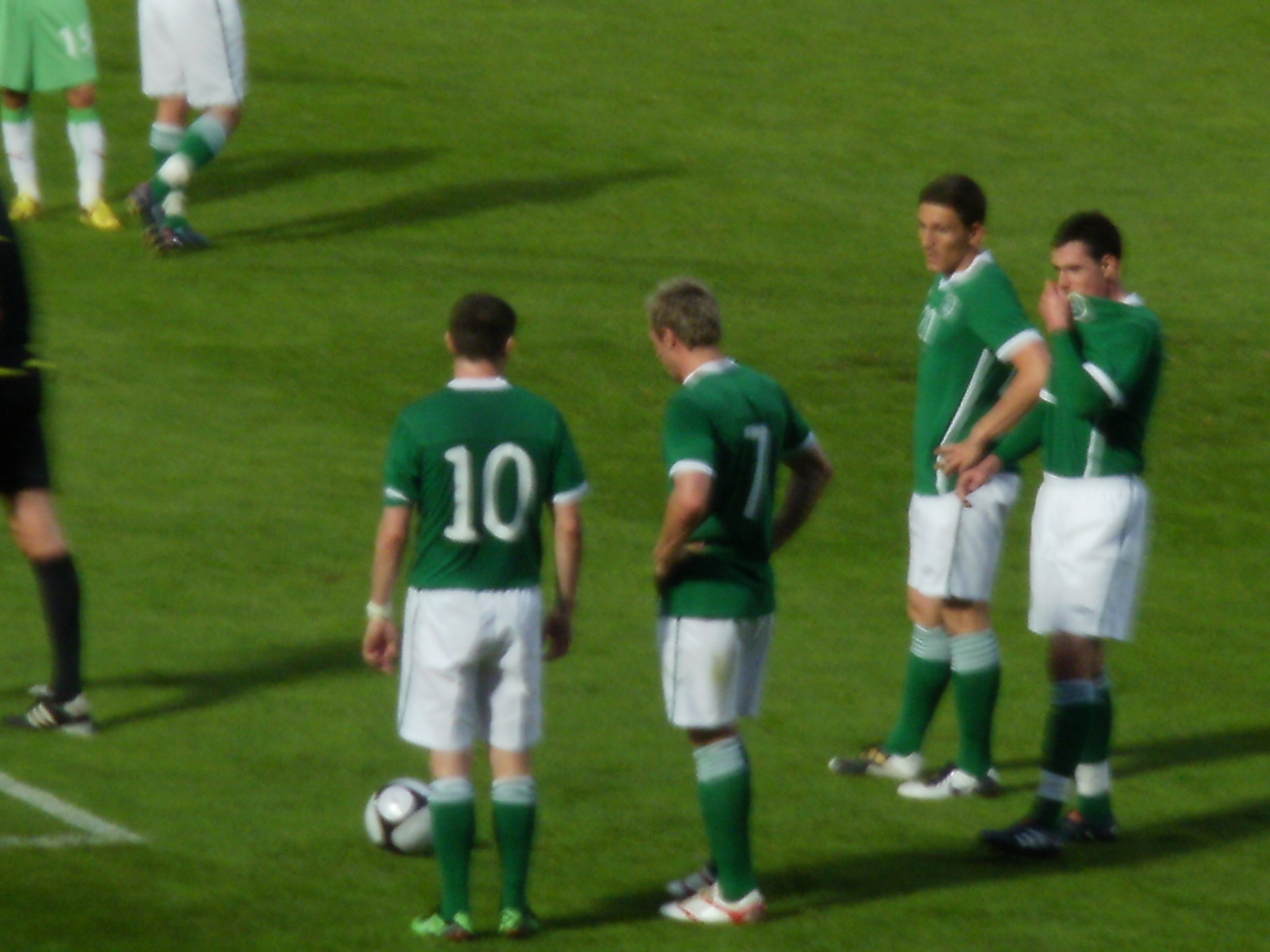
Ireland players (L-R) Robbie Keane, Liam Lawrence, Keith Andrews and Keith Fahey in a 2010 friendly against Algeria

Traditionally, the team has played in a home strip of green shirt, white shorts and green socks. The second strip is usually the reverse of these colours, although there have been exceptions, such as an orange shirt in the late 1990s. Squad numbers are either white with an orange trim, on the home shirts, or green with an orange trim. The shirts worn in the team's first international match at the 1924 Olympics were St. Patrick's blue; this was their change jersey at the time, but the match was against Bulgaria, whose home strip was green. In 2021, Ireland again wore a blue jersey in a friendly against Qatar to commemorate the FAI's centenary.

A limited edition grey shirt was used just once, in a match against Wales on 17 November 2007. A black jersey with a green stripe across the chest was worn in the final game of the 2011 Nations Cup against Scotland and in a friendly against Italy in Liège, Belgium.

The previous kit was supplied by Umbro since 1994. In March 2009, Umbro signed a deal with the FAI to keep them as kit suppliers to the team until 2020. However New Balance became kit suppliers in August 2017. This deal only lasted 3 years before Umbro returned as kit suppliers in November 2020. Umbro's return was also brief however, with Castore taking over in 2023.

=== Home stadium and other venues ===
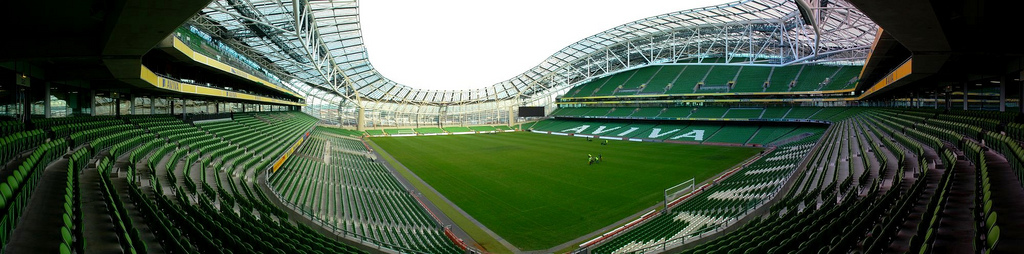
Aviva Stadium

Since the 1980s, most home matches have been played at Lansdowne Road, Dublin, the national rugby stadium owned by the Irish Rugby Football Union (IRFU). The ground was closed for redevelopment in 2007, with the replacement ground, the Aviva Stadium, opening on 14 May 2010. The first football match in the Aviva was Manchester United against a League of Ireland XI side, managed by Damien Richardson, on 4 August 2010. Manchester United won the game 7–1, with Park Ji-Sung scoring the first goal in the Aviva Stadium. Aviva Stadium is jointly owned by the IRFU and FAI, although it will return to solely IRFU ownership on expiry of the current 60-year lease. The first football international played at Lansdowne Road by a FAI team was a friendly against Italy in 1971 (an IFA team first played in 1878 against England); a 5–0 victory over San Marino in a UEFA Euro 2008 qualifying Group D match on 15 November 2006 was the last game there before the reconstruction. The all-seater capacity of Lansdowne Road prior to the renovation was 36,000, although higher attendances, using the standing only areas, were permitted for friendly matches. The Aviva Stadium's status as an all-seater increased capacity for competitive games to 51,700. The opening game at the Aviva Stadium, a controversial 1–0 friendly defeat to Argentina, was noted for Robbie Keane securing his membership in the FIFA Century Club and manager Giovanni Trapattoni's absence due to surgery, with assistant manager Marco Tardelli taking charge.

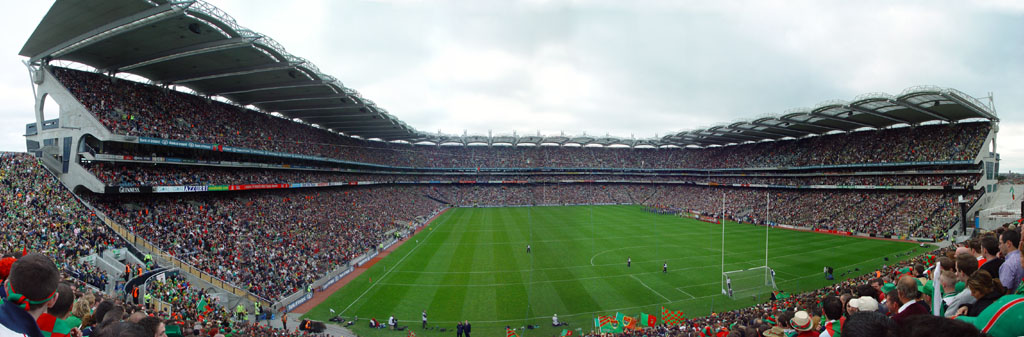
Croke Park, the headquarters of the Gaelic Athletic Association, has been used for Irish matches.

With the announcement of the rebuilding of Lansdowne Road, a new venue was required to stage the Republic of Ireland's home internationals. The only stadium in Ireland deemed suitable to stage international football was the 82,300 capacity Croke Park, home of the Gaelic Athletic Association (GAA). To accommodate this, the GAA temporarily relaxed its rule governing the playing of "foreign" games on its property. Initially, four UEFA Euro 2008 qualifying Group D matches were played at Croke Park in 2007, resulting in two wins and two draws. The GAA initially agreed to allow the FAI use until the end of 2008, and later extended the permission until the completion of Aviva Stadium. The Hill 16 end of Croke Park is a terrace, which means like Lansdowne Road before it, the capacity of the stadium was reduced to around 74,500 for competitive matches as temporary seating must be used.

Prior to the 1980s, the Republic of Ireland played most home games at Dalymount Park, home of Bohemians, but progressively more games were played at Lansdowne Road following a safety review which reduced Dalymount's capacity. The last international match played there was against Morocco in 1990. The Republic of Ireland have also played home matches in Tolka Park (twice) and the RDS Arena in Dublin as well at the Mardyke and Flower Lodge grounds in Cork. These games in Cork were, until 2009, the only two home Irish internationals played outside of Dublin. During the construction of the Aviva Stadium, two friendly games were played in Thomond Park, Limerick, in 2009. Two further friendlies were played in the RDS Arena in May 2010. Ireland played a friendly against Belarus in Cork's 7,000 capacity Turners Cross stadium in May 2016.

=== Media coverage ===
Ireland matches currently broadcast by Raidió Teilifís Éireann (RTÉ) (qualifiers only), Sky Sports, and highlights on Virgin Media Television. Sky Sports shows most of Ireland's friendly matches, while RTÉ shows competitive games such as World Cup and European Championship qualifiers. RTÉ briefly lost its broadcast rights in 2002 when the FAI controversially sold them in a multi-million deal to Sky Sports, a subscription based satellite channel. The decision was criticised by fans and politicians, and the Consumers' Association of Ireland (CAI) described the FAI as "greedy". The FAI was eventually forced to reverse its decision and to allow RTÉ to continue its broadcasts after the government intervened to stop the sale of important Irish sporting events to non-terrestrial television broadcasters. RTE hold all the rights to currently broadcast any Republic of Ireland match from qualifiers to friendlys

=== Selection and nationality issues ===
The selection of young players born in Northern Ireland, especially those who have already represented Northern Ireland at youth level, into Republic of Ireland national teams has been controversial, as these players are able to claim Irish nationality even though born and brought up outside the Republic's territory. This has led to accusations of unfairness and predatory behaviour. In Northern Ireland it is seen by Northern Ireland supporters as having the effect of dividing international football in their country along sectarian lines, whereby Nationalists will declare for the Republic of Ireland while Unionists continue to play for Northern Ireland. It has also been argued that it is actually the sectarian divisions, which already existed in Northern Irish football, that are a factor in a number of players switching to the Republic. The switches of Darron Gibson, and James McClean brought matters to a head in the 2010s as a previous unspoken reluctance to be seen to 'pilfer' players, and some ambiguity on the rules, broke down after the Good Friday Agreement clarified in both British and Irish law the right of anyone born in Northern Ireland to Irish citizenship as a birthright. FIFA accepting this gave any northern born players the right to switch to play for the Republic unless they had a full competitive cap for Northern Ireland. Traditionally, those in Northern Ireland who identify as Irish, predominantly Catholics and nationalists, support the Republic of Ireland team. Martin O'Neill, captain of the 1982 Northern Ireland team that reached the World Cup that year in Spain, has managed the Republic, and Brendan Rodgers, and Neil Lennon, both high profile Northern Ireland football figures have been linked with the next vacancy.

== Results and fixtures ==
The following is a list of match results in the last 12 months, as well as any future matches that have been scheduled.

Win Draw Loss Future game

=== 2026 ===
26 March 2026 2026 FIFA World Cup qualification play-offs	Czech Republic	2–2 (a.e.t.) (4–3 p)	Republic of Ireland	Prague, Czech Republic
20:45 UTC+1	Schick 27' (pen.); Krejčí 86'	Report	Parrott 19' (pen.); Kovář 23' (o.g.)	Stadium: Fortuna Arena; Attendance: 19,137; Referee: Glenn Nyberg (Sweden)
	Penalties
	Krejčí (penalty scored); Soucek (penalty scored); Chytil (penalty missed); Schick (penalty scored); Kliment (penalty scored)		(penalty scored) Parrott; (penalty scored) Idah; (penalty scored) Brady; (penalty missed) Azaz; (penalty missed) Browne

31 March 2026 Friendly	Republic of Ireland	0–0	North Macedonia	Dublin, Ireland
19:45 UTC+1		Report		Stadium: Aviva Stadium; Attendance: 39,560; Referee: Iwan Arwel Griffith (Wales)

16 May 2026 Friendly	Grenada	0–5	Republic of Ireland	Murcia, Spain
18:00 UTC+2		Report	Cannon 46', 56'; Moylan 62', 80', 84'	Stadium: Estadio Nueva Condomina; Attendance: 862; Referee: Seth Galia (Gibraltar)

28 May 2026 Friendly	Republic of Ireland	1–0	Qatar	Dublin, Ireland
19:45 UTC+1	Collins 5'; Moylan (red card) 45'	Report	Ali (red card) 78'	Stadium: Aviva Stadium; Attendance: 28,981; Referee: Jamie Robinson (Northern Ireland)

5 June 2026 Friendly	Canada	1–1	Republic of Ireland	Montreal, Canada
19:45 UTC−4	O'Brien 23' (o.g.)	Report	Parrott (penalty missed) 60'; Ogbene 60'	Stadium: Saputo Stadium; Attendance: 19,619; Referee: Pablo Camacho (Costa Rica)

24 September 2026 2026–27 UEFA Nations League	Kosovo	1–0	Republic of Ireland	Pristina, Kosovo
20:45	Muriqi 83'	Report		Stadium: Fadil Vokrri Stadium; Attendance: 12,627; Referee: Lawrence Visser (Belgium)

27 September 2026 2026–27 UEFA Nations League	Israel	0–3	Republic of Ireland	Debrecen, Hungary (Note: Due to the Gaza war, Israel are required to play their home matches at neutral venues until further notice.)
20:45		Report	Parrott 14'; Idah 16'; Moylan 25'	Stadium: Nagyerdei Stadion; Attendance: 319; Referee: Harm Osmers (Germany)

1 October 2026 2026–27 UEFA Nations League	Republic of Ireland	2–2	Austria	Dublin, Ireland
19:45 UTC+1	Parrott 12', 45' (pen.)	Report	Prass 71'; Gregoritsch 77'	Stadium: Aviva Stadium; Attendance: 45,784; Referee: Allard Lindhout (Netherlands)

4 October 2026 2026–27 UEFA Nations League	Republic of Ireland	1–1	Israel	Bačka Topola, Serbia (Note: Moved from Ireland to Serbia after the FAI Board decided to move the fixture to a neutral territory due to "operational challenges that could impact on the delivery of the game on home soil.")
19:45 UTC+1	Parrott 39' (pen.)	Report	D. Peretz 47'	Stadium: TSC Arena; Attendance: 0 (Behind closed doors); Referee: Juan Martínez Munuera (Spain)

14 November 2026 2026–27 UEFA Nations League	Austria	1–0	Republic of Ireland	Linz, Austria
20:45 UTC+2	Kalajdžić 78'	Report		Stadium: Raiffeisen Arena; Attendance: 16,700; Referee: Irfan Peljto (Bosnia and Herzegovina)

17 November 2026 2026–27 UEFA Nations League	Republic of Ireland	3–0	Kosovo	Dublin, Ireland
19:45 UTC+1	Parrott 28' (pen.), 50' (pen.); Moylan 75'	Report	Hajrizi (red card) 26'	Stadium: Aviva Stadium; Attendance: 50,381; Referee: Edgars Maļcevs (Latvia)

=== 2027 ===
27 March 2027 2026–27 Nations League promotion play-off	Republic of Ireland	v	Croatia	Dublin, Ireland
19:45 UTC+0		Report		Stadium: Aviva Stadium

30 March 2027 2026–27 Nations League promotion play-off	Croatia	v	Republic of Ireland	Croatia
20:45 UTC+1		Report

== Coaching staff ==
Position	Name
Head coach	(Iceland) Heimir Hallgrímsson
Assistant coaches	(Republic of Ireland) John O'Shea (Republic of Ireland) Paddy McCarthy
Goalkeeping coach	(Iceland) Guðmundur Hreiðarsson

=== Coaching history ===
Between 1924 and 1969, a committee of selectors chose the team, on occasions a coach or team manager was appointed; Mick Meagan was the first manager to actually select the team. Managers from the periods in which the national side was known as the Irish Free State or simply Ireland are obscure and many are not currently known, however it is known that Val Harris, Bill Lacey and Alex Stevenson managed the side.

As of match played on 17 November 2026

Manager	Career	P	W	D	L	GF	GA	GD	Win %	Loss %	Notes
Selection Committee	1924–1931	10	6	1	3	21	13	4	60%	30%	
(Republic of Ireland) Bill Lacey	1931–1936	4	1	1	2	12	16	–4	25%	50%	
(Republic of Ireland) Val Harris	1932	1	1	0	0	2	0	2	100%	0%	
Selection Committee	1936–1938	6	2	2	2	12	11	1	33.3%	33.3%	
(Republic of Ireland) Joe Wickham	1938	3	2	0	1	7	8	–1	66.7%	33.3%	
Selection Committee	1939–1951	23	6	5	12	27	41	–14	26.1%	52.2%	
(Scotland) Doug Livingstone	1951–1953	6	2	1	3	8	18	–10	33.3%	50%	
(Republic of Ireland) Alex Stevenson	1953–1955	8	5	0	3	15	10	5	62.5%	37.5%	
(Republic of Ireland) Johnny Carey	1955–1967	46	17	7	22	67	95	−28	37%	47.8%	Reached quarter-final stage of 1964 European Nations' Cup
(Republic of Ireland) Noel Cantwell	1967	1	0	0	1	0	2	−2	0%	100%	
(Republic of Ireland) Charlie Hurley	1967–1969	8	1	3	4	9	13	−4	7.7%	30.8%	
(Republic of Ireland) Mick Meagan	1969–1971	12	0	3	9	7	26	−19	0%	75%	
(Republic of Ireland) Liam Tuohy	1971–1973	10	3	1	6	11	20	−9	30%	60%	
(Republic of Ireland) Seán Thomas	1973	1	0	1	0	1	1	0	0%	0%	Caretaker
(Republic of Ireland) Johnny Giles	1973–1980	37	14	9	14	49	45	3	37.8%	37.8%	
(Republic of Ireland) Alan Kelly, Sr.	1980	1	1	0	0	2	0	2	100%	0%	Caretaker
(Republic of Ireland) Eoin Hand	1980–1985	40	11	9	20	47	59	−12	27.5%	50%	
(England) Jack Charlton	1986–1996	94	47	30	17	128	63	65	50%	18.1%	Qualified for Euro 1988, and World Cups 1990 and 1994
(Republic of Ireland) Mick McCarthy	1996–2002	68	29	20	19	112	67	45	42.6%	29.4%	Qualified for 2002 World Cup
(Republic of Ireland) Don Givens	2002	1	0	1	0	0	0	0	0%	0%	Caretaker
(Republic of Ireland) Brian Kerr	2003–2005	33	18	11	4	39	20	19	54.5%	12.1%	
(Republic of Ireland) Steve Staunton	2006–2007	17	6	6	5	24	19	5	35.3%	29.4%	
(Republic of Ireland) Don Givens	2007–2008	2	0	1	1	2	3	−1	0%	33.3%	Caretaker
(Italy) Giovanni Trapattoni	2008–2013	64	26	22	16	86	64	22	40.6%	25%	Qualified for Euro 2012
(Republic of Ireland) Noel King	2013	2	1	0	1	3	4	−1	50%	50%	Caretaker
(Northern Ireland) Martin O'Neill	2013–2018	55	19	20	16	68	56	12	34.5%	27.3%	Qualified for Euro 2016
(Republic of Ireland) Mick McCarthy	2018–2020	10	5	4	1	13	7	6	50%	10%	
(Republic of Ireland) Stephen Kenny	2020–2023	40	11	12	17	47	41	6	27.5%	42.5%	
(Republic of Ireland) John O'Shea	2024	4	1	1	2	2	5	–3	25%	50%	Interim
(Iceland) Heimir Hallgrímsson	2024–	27	11	8	8	35	30	5	40.7%	29.6%	
Total		641	248	180	213	870	773	+97	38.69%	33.2%	

== Players ==
=== Current squad ===
The following players were called up for the 2026–27 UEFA Nations League B matches against Austria & Kosovo on 14 & 17 November 2026.

Information correct as of 17 November 2026, after the match against Kosovo.

No.	Pos.	Player	Date of birth (age)	Caps	Goals	Club
1	GK	Caoimhín Kelleher	28 November 1998 (age 27)	38	0	(The Football Association) Brentford
16	GK	Max O'Leary	10 October 1996 (age 30)	2	0	(The Football Association) West Bromwich Albion
23	GK	Mark Travers	18 May 1999 (age 27)	6	0	(The Football Association) Everton
2	DF	James Abankwah	16 January 2004 (age 22)	9	0	(Italian Football Federation) Udinese
3	DF	Liam Scales	8 August 1998 (age 28)	21	1	(Scottish Football Association) Celtic
4	DF	Dara O'Shea (Vice-captain)	4 March 1999 (age 27)	50	0	(The Football Association) Ipswich Town
5	DF	Jake O'Brien	15 May 2001 (age 25)	23	0	(The Football Association) Everton
12	DF	Liam Kitching	25 September 1999 (age 27)	3	0	(The Football Association) Sheffield United
15	DF	John Egan	20 October 1992 (age 34)	41	3	(The Football Association) Hull City
18	DF	Ryan Manning	14 June 1996 (age 30)	29	0	(The Football Association) Southampton
22	DF	Jimmy Dunne	19 October 1997 (age 29)	4	0	(The Football Association) Queens Park Rangers
6	MF	Jayson Molumby	6 August 1999 (age 27)	42	0	(The Football Association) West Bromwich Albion
8	MF	Jason Knight	13 February 2001 (age 25)	46	1	(The Football Association) Bristol City
11	MF	Finn Azaz	7 September 2000 (age 26)	18	1	(The Football Association) Southampton
14	MF	Conor Coventry	25 March 2000 (age 26)	7	0	(The Football Association) Charlton Athletic
19	MF	Harvey Vale	11 September 2003 (age 23)	4	0	(The Football Association) Queens Park Rangers
21	MF	Bosun Lawal	30 May 2003 (age 23)	3	0	(The Football Association) Stoke City
7	FW	Troy Parrott	4 February 2002 (age 24)	43	17	(Royal Spanish Football Federation) Real Betis
9	FW	Tom Cannon	28 December 2002 (age 23)	5	2	(The Football Association) Sheffield United
10	FW	Adam Idah	11 February 2001 (age 25)	46	7	(Football Association of Wales) Swansea City (Note: Swansea City are a Welsh club playing in the English football league system.)
13	FW	Rocco Vata	18 April 2005 (age 21)	4	0	(The Football Association) Watford
17	FW	Jack Moylan	1 September 2001 (age 25)	8	5	(Football Association of Wales) Cardiff City (Note: Cardiff City are a Welsh club playing in the English football league system.)
20	FW	Chiedozie Ogbene	1 May 1997 (age 29)	40	5	(The Football Association) Lincoln City

=== Recent call-ups ===
The following players have been called up to the national team in the past 12 months but are not part of the current squad.

Pos.	Player	Date of birth (age)	Caps	Goals	Club	Latest call-up
GK	Josh Keeley	17 May 2003 (age 23)	1	0	(England) Luton Town	v. Israel, 4 October 2026
GK	Gavin Bazunu	20 February 2002 (age 24)	22	0	(England) Bolton Wanderers	v. Israel, 4 October 2026^{WD}
GK	Conor Brann	27 June 2003 (age 23)	0	0	(Republic of Ireland) Cork City	v. Canada, 5 June 2026
GK	Edward McGinty	5 August 1999 (age 27)	0	0	(Republic of Ireland) Shamrock Rovers	v. Canada, 5 June 2026
GK	Killian Cahill	3 November 2003 (age 23)	0	0	(England) Leyton Orient	v. Grenada, 16 May 2026
DF	Nathan Collins (Captain)	30 April 2001 (age 25)	41	3	(England) Brentford	v. Kosovo, 17 November 2026^{INJ}
DF	Joel Bagan	3 September 2001 (age 25)	2	0	(Wales) Cardiff City	v. Israel, 4 October 2026
DF	Séamus Coleman	12 October 1988 (age 38)	81	1	Free agent	v. Canada, 5 June 2026
DF	Corrie Ndaba	25 December 1999 (age 26)	2	0	(Italy) Lecce	v. Canada, 5 June 2026
DF	Alex Murphy	25 June 2004 (age 22)	0	0	(Germany) 1. FC Kaiserslautern	v. Canada, 5 June 2026
DF	Andrew Omobamidele	23 June 2002 (age 24)	10	0	(Belgium) Anderlecht	v. Qatar, 28 May 2026^{INJ}
DF	Mark McGuinness	5 January 2001 (age 25)	2	0	(England) Sheffield United	v. Grenada, 16 May 2026
DF	Tayo Adaramola	14 November 2003 (age 23)	1	0	(Belgium) Cercle Brugge	v. Grenada, 16 May 2026
DF	Will Ferry	7 December 2000 (age 25)	1	0	(Scotland) Dundee United	v. Grenada, 16 May 2026
DF	Eiran Cashin	9 November 2001 (age 25)	0	0	(England) Derby County	v. Grenada, 16 May 2026
DF	Robbie Brady	14 January 1992 (age 34)	73	10	Free agent	v. North Macedonia, 31 March 2026^{PRE}
MF	Killian Phillips	30 March 2002 (age 24)	5	0	(Scotland) St Mirren	v. Israel, 4 October 2026
MF	Jamie McGrath	30 September 1996 (age 30)	15	0	(Scotland) Hibernian	v. Kosovo, 24 September 2026^{INJ}
MF	Kian Leavy	21 March 2002 (age 24)	1	0	(Republic of Ireland) St Patricks Athletic	v. Canada, 5 June 2026
MF	Joe Hodge	14 September 2002 (age 24)	1	0	(Scotland) Motherwell	v. Canada, 5 June 2026
MF	Dawson Devoy	20 November 2001 (age 25)	1	0	(Republic of Ireland) Bohemians	v. Canada, 5 June 2026
MF	Matt Healy	12 April 2002 (age 24)	0	0	(Republic of Ireland) Shamrock Rovers	v. Canada, 5 June 2026
MF	Josh O'Dwyer	17 March 2010 (age 16)	0	0	(Austria) Liefering	v. Canada, 5 June 2026
MF	Alan Browne	15 April 1995 (age 31)	39	5	(England) Sunderland	v. Qatar, 28 May 2026^{INJ}
MF	Alex Gilbert	28 December 2001 (age 24)	0	0	(England) Leyton Orient	v. Qatar, 28 May 2026^{INJ}
MF	Andrew Moran	15 October 2003 (age 23)	4	0	(England) Preston North End	v. Grenada, 16 May 2026
MF	Rory Finneran	29 February 2008 (age 18)	1	0	(England) Notts County	v. Grenada, 16 May 2026
MF	Jack Taylor	23 June 1998 (age 28)	11	0	(England) Ipswich Town	v. North Macedonia, 31 March 2026^{WD}
FW	Owen Elding	7 March 2006 (age 20)	1	0	(Scotland) Hibernian	v. Israel, 4 October 2026
FW	Mason Melia	22 September 2007 (age 19)	2	0	(England) Lincoln City	v. Canada, 5 June 2026
FW	Jaden Umeh	18 March 2008 (age 18)	2	0	(Portugal) Benfica	v. Canada, 5 June 2026
FW	Adam Brennan	29 May 2007 (age 19)	1	0	(Republic of Ireland) Shamrock Rovers	v. Canada, 5 June 2026
FW	Millenic Alli	6 February 2000 (age 26)	1	0	(England) Charlton Athletic	v. Grenada, 16 May 2026
FW	Aidomo Emakhu	26 October 2003 (age 23)	1	0	(England) Oxford United	v. Grenada, 16 May 2026
FW	Kasey McAteer	22 November 2001 (age 24)	8	1	(England) Ipswich Town	v. Grenada, 16 May 2026^{INJ}
FW	Johnny Kenny	6 June 2003 (age 23)	2	0	(England) Preston North End	v. North Macedonia, 31 March 2026
FW	Sammie Szmodics	24 September 1995 (age 31)	12	0	(England) Derby County	v. North Macedonia, 31 March 2026^{INJ}
^{INJ} Withdrew from latest squad due to injury^{PRE} Preliminary squad / standby^{WD} Player withdrew from the squad due to a non-injury issue^{CLU} Withdrew from latest squad by his club^{SUS} Player is suspended

== Player records ==
As of 17 November 2026
Players in bold are still active with Ireland.

=== Most caps ===
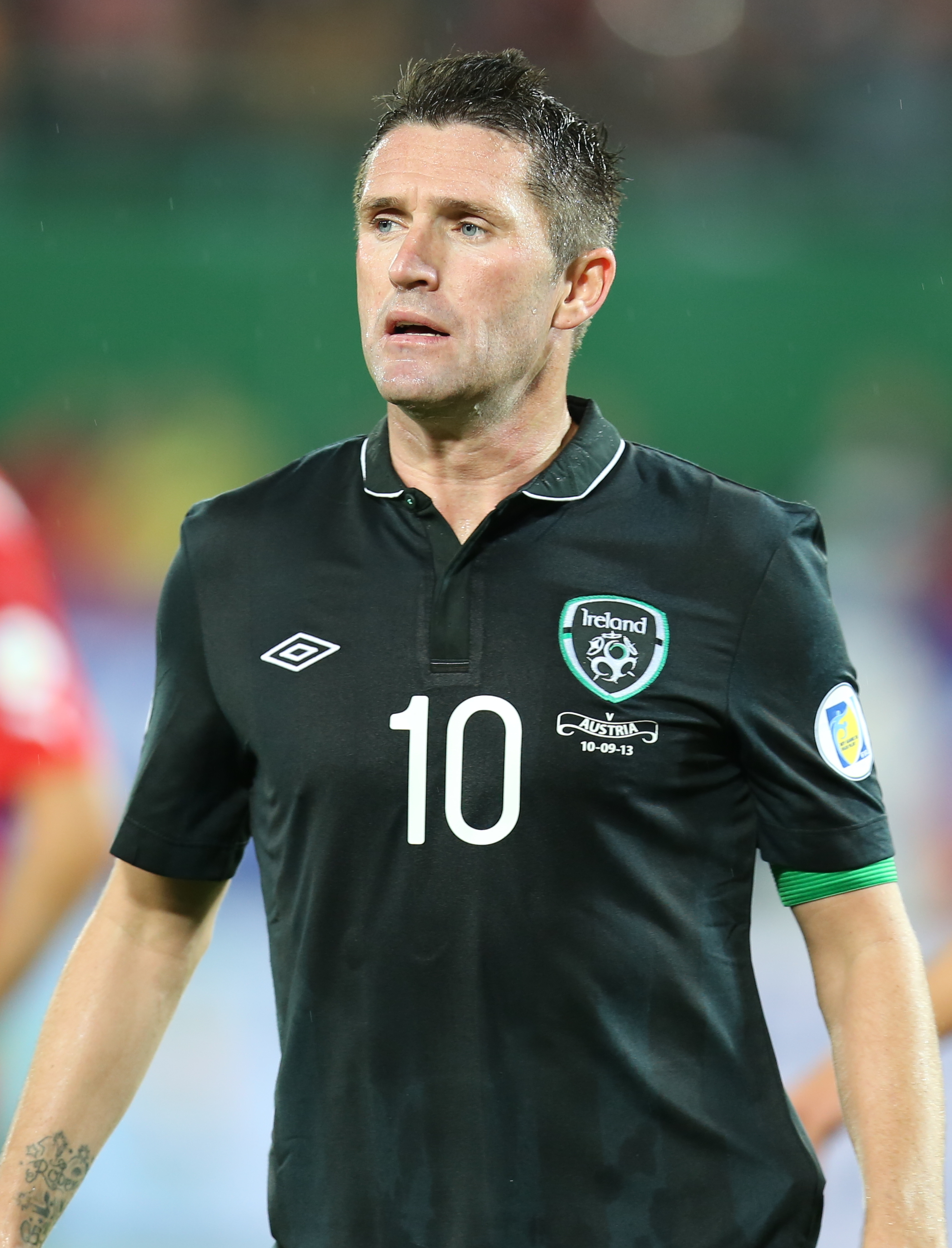
Robbie Keane, top goalscorer and the most-capped player.

Rank	Player	Caps	Goals	Career
1	Robbie Keane	146	68	1998–2016
2	Shay Given	134	0	1996–2016
3	John O'Shea	118	3	2001–2018
4	Kevin Kilbane	110	8	1997–2011
5	James McClean	103	11	2012–2023
6	Steve Staunton	102	8	1988–2002
7	Damien Duff	100	8	1998–2012
8	Aiden McGeady	93	5	2004–2017
9	Niall Quinn	91	21	1986–2002
9	Glenn Whelan	91	2	2008–2019

=== Most goals ===
Rank	Player	Goals	Caps	Average	Career
1	Robbie Keane (list)	68	146	0.47	1998–2016
2	Niall Quinn	21	91	0.23	1986–2002
3	Frank Stapleton	20	71	0.28	1977–1990
4	Don Givens	19	56	0.34	1969–1981
4	John Aldridge	19	69	0.28	1986–1997
4	Tony Cascarino	19	88	0.22	1985–2000
7	**Troy Parrott**	17	43	0.40	2019–present
7	Shane Long	17	88	0.19	2007–2021
9	Noel Cantwell	14	36	0.39	1953–1967
9	Jonathan Walters	14	54	0.26	2010–2018
9	Kevin Doyle	14	63	0.22	2006–2017

== Competitive record ==
=== FIFA World Cup ===
In the 1934 qualifiers, Paddy Moore (v. Belgium) became the first player anywhere to score 4 goals in a World Cup match. For the 1950 World Cup, after three qualified teams withdrew, FIFA invited the FAI to compete as a replacement, however they declined. During qualification for the 1962 World Cup, it was the only qualifying tournament in which the team had a 0% record. During qualification for the 1966 World Cup, Ireland reached their first play-off against Spain. Goal difference did not count, so a play-off was contested at the Stade Colombes, Paris, and Ireland failed to progress. Ireland almost qualified for the 1982 World Cup but lost on goal difference to France in a tough and tight group. Fans lamented some controversial refereeing decisions.

For the 1990 World Cup, Ireland reached the quarter finals of the tournament for the first time in their history. It was Ireland's first participation in a FIFA World Cup. Ireland played England in the first drawing 1–1. Ireland drew the next two matches but ultimately qualified for the knockout stages where they played Romania. The match ended 0–0 and Ireland won on penalties 5–4 which sent Ireland into the quarter-final showdown against the tournament host Italy. There Ireland lost 1–0 via a Salvatore Schillaci goal in the 38th minute that sent the Irish out of the competition.

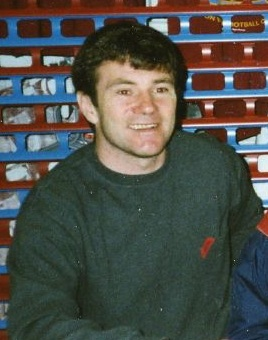
Ray Houghton scored against Italy at the 1994 FIFA World Cup

In 1994, Ireland participated in their second consecutive World Cup. This time they were drawn with Mexico, Norway and Italy. Ireland won their first game against Italy which was the first time Ireland had won a World Cup match and their first victory over Italy with a notable goal from Ray Houghton. Ireland lost against Mexico in the second group match and drew with Norway but still made to the knockout phase where they faced the Netherlands. Ireland lost 2–0.

For the 1998 qualification campaign, Ireland scraped into the play-offs largely due to Tony Cascarino's seven goals in ten games. They lost in the play-off against Belgium, drawing 1–1 in the first leg then losing 2–1 in the second leg. Although for next campaign Ireland were drawn with two big European nations, the Netherlands, Portugal. Ireland went the whole campaign unbeaten, beating the Netherlands 1–0 in the process; Jason McAteer scored the sole goal.

At the start of the tournament, captain Roy Keane and manager Mick McCarthy where involved in a "bust up" and Keane was sent home. Despite this, McCarthy did not call up a replacement and continued with 22 players. Ireland drew in their first match against Cameroon and in their second match they drew again against the tournaments runner up Germany. In Ireland's final group match, they defeated Saudi Arabia, their second ever victory in a World Cup, and progressed to the round of 16. There, they met Spain, and lost in a penalty shoot-out.

After failure to qualify for the 2006 World Cup, Ireland reached a play-off against France for a place at the 2010 tournament.

France's Thierry Henry's handball stirred international controversy after the move set up William Gallas to score in extra-time of the second leg of the play-off; the referee did not notice and allowed the goal to stand, leading to widespread media controversy, protests at the French embassy in Dublin and comments from senior government officials from both countries.

FIFA World Cup record									Qualification record						
Year	Round	Position	Pld	W	D*	L	GF	GA	Pld	W	D	L	GF	GA	Position
(Uruguay) 1930	Did not enter								Declined participation						
(Italy) 1934	Did not qualify								2	0	1	1	6	9	3/3
(France) 1938	Did not qualify								2	0	1	1	5	6	2/2
(Brazil) 1950	Did not qualify								4	1	1	2	6	7	2/3
(Switzerland) 1954	Did not qualify								4	2	0	2	8	6	2/3
(Sweden) 1958	Did not qualify								4	2	1	1	6	7	2/3
(Chile) 1962	Did not qualify								4	0	0	4	3	17	3/3
(England) 1966	Did not qualify								3	1	0	2	2	5	Lost Play-off
(Mexico) 1970	Did not qualify								6	0	1	5	3	14	4/4
(Germany) 1974	Did not qualify								4	1	1	2	4	5	2/3
(Argentina) 1978	Did not qualify								4	1	1	2	2	4	3/3
(Spain) 1982	Did not qualify								8	4	2	2	17	11	3/5
(Mexico) 1986	Did not qualify								8	2	2	4	5	10	4/5
(Italy) 1990	Quarter-finals	8th	5	0	4	1	2	3	8	5	2	1	10	2	2/5
(United States) 1994	Round of 16	16th	4	1	1	2	2	4	12	7	4	1	19	6	2/7
(France) 1998	Did not qualify								12	5	4	3	24	11	2/6; Lost Play-off
(South Korea) (Japan) 2002	Round of 16	12th	4	1	3	0	6	3	12	8	3	1	25	6	2/6; Won Play-off
(Germany) 2006	Did not qualify								10	4	5	1	12	5	4/6
(South Africa) 2010	Did not qualify								12	4	7	1	13	10	2/6; Lost Play-off
(Brazil) 2014	Did not qualify								10	4	2	4	16	17	4/6
(Russia) 2018	Did not qualify								12	5	5	2	13	11	2/6; Lost Play-off
(Qatar) 2022	Did not qualify								8	2	3	3	11	8	3/5
(Canada) (Mexico) (United States) 2026	Did not qualify								7	3	2	2	11	9	2/4; Lost Play-off
(Morocco) (Portugal) (Spain) 2030	To be determined								To be determined						
(Saudi Arabia) 2034	To be determined								To be determined						
Total	Quarter-finals	3/23	13	2	8	3	10	10	157	61	49	47	221	186	—

*Draws include knockout matches decided via penalty shoot-out.

List of FIFA World Cup matches
Year	Round	Score	Result	Republic of Ireland scorers
1990	Group stage	Republic of Ireland 1–1 England	Draw	Kevin Sheedy 73'
1990	Group stage	Republic of Ireland 1–1 Netherlands	Draw	Niall Quinn 71'
1990	Group stage	Republic of Ireland 0–0 Egypt	Draw	—
1990	Round of 16	Republic of Ireland 0–0 (5–4 p) Romania	Draw	—
1990	Quarter-finals	Republic of Ireland 0–1 Italy	Loss	—
1994	Group stage	Republic of Ireland 1–0 Italy	Win	Ray Houghton 11'
1994	Group stage	Republic of Ireland 1–2 Mexico	Loss	John Aldridge 84'
1994	Group stage	Republic of Ireland 0–0 Norway	Draw	—
1994	Round of 16	Republic of Ireland 0–2 Netherlands	Loss	—
2002	Group stage	Republic of Ireland 1–1 Cameroon	Draw	Matt Holland 52'
2002	Group stage	Republic of Ireland 1–1 Germany	Draw	Robbie Keane 90+2'
2002	Group stage	Republic of Ireland 3–0 Saudi Arabia	Win	Robbie Keane 7'; Gary Breen 61'; Damien Duff 87'
2002	Round of 16	Republic of Ireland 1–1 (2–3 p) Spain	Draw	Robbie Keane 90' (pen.)

=== UEFA European Championship ===
Irish line up for Ireland's fixture against Italy at Euro 2016

Ireland reached the quarter-finals of the 1964 European Nations' Cup, but failed to qualify for the final tournament after losing on aggregate to Spain.

Ireland did not qualify for a European Championship until Euro 1988. On 12 June 1988 in Stuttgart, the Irish team took to the pitch in its first match at a major championship finals against England. Ray Houghton of Liverpool scored the only goal of the match as Ireland secured victory. Ireland took on the former Soviet Union next and took the lead late in the first half via a volley from Liverpool's Ronnie Whelan. The lead was cancelled out midway through the second half by Oleh Protasov as the match ended in a 1–1 draw. In their final match, Ireland lost out to the Netherlands 1–0.

It was not until 2011 that Ireland clinched a place at another European Championship, qualifying for Euro 2012 with a 5–1 aggregate victory over Estonia. At the tournament itself, however, Ireland lost all three of its matches and conceded nine goals, the nation's worst performance in a major tournament to date.

Ireland qualified to Euro 2016 following a play-off victory over Bosnia and Herzegovina. In the group stages they drew 1–1 with Sweden, having initially taken the lead through a Wes Hoolahan strike, before being beaten 3–0 by Belgium in the following game. However, a 1–0 victory over Italy in their final game, courtesy of a late header from Robbie Brady, earned the side a spot in the round of 16, the first time the team had ever advanced from the group stage at a European Championship. In the round of 16, Ireland faced the hosts France and, after taking an early lead through a Brady penalty, were beaten 2–1.

UEFA European Championship record									Qualification record						
Year	Round	Position	Pld	W	D	L	GF	GA	Pld	W	D	L	GF	GA	Position
(France) 1960	Did not qualify								2	1	0	1	2	4	Preliminary round
(Spain) 1964	Did not qualify								6	2	2	2	9	12	Quarter-finals
(Italy) 1968	Did not qualify								6	2	1	3	5	8	3/4
(Belgium) 1972	Did not qualify								6	0	1	5	3	17	4/4
(Socialist Federal Republic of Yugoslavia) 1976	Did not qualify								6	3	1	2	11	5	2/4
(Italy) 1980	Did not qualify								8	2	3	3	9	8	3/5
(France) 1984	Did not qualify								8	4	1	3	20	10	3/5
(West Germany) 1988	Group stage	5th	3	1	1	1	2	2	8	4	3	1	10	5	1/5
(Sweden) 1992	Did not qualify								6	2	4	0	13	6	2/4
(England) 1996	Did not qualify								11	5	2	4	17	13	2/6; Lost Play-off
(Belgium) (Netherlands) 2000	Did not qualify								10	5	3	2	15	7	2/5; Lost Play-off
(Portugal) 2004	Did not qualify								8	3	2	3	10	11	3/5
(Austria) (Switzerland) 2008	Did not qualify								12	4	5	3	17	14	3/7
(Poland) (Ukraine) 2012	Group stage	16th	3	0	0	3	1	9	12	7	4	1	20	8	2/6; Won Play-off
(France) 2016	Round of 16	15th	4	1	1	2	3	6	12	6	4	2	22	8	3/6; Won Play-off
(Europe) 2020	Did not qualify								9	3	5	1	7	5	3/5; Lost Play-off
(Germany) 2024	Did not qualify								8	2	0	6	9	10	4/5
(England) (Scotland) (Wales) (Republic of Ireland) 2028	To be determined								To be determined						
(Italy) (Turkey) 2032	To be determined								To be determined						
Total	Round of 16	3/17	10	2	2	6	6	17	138	55	41	42	199	151	—

List of UEFA European Championship matches
Year	Round	Score	Result	Republic of Ireland scorers
1988	Round 1	Republic of Ireland 1 – 0 England	Win	Ray Houghton 6'
1988	Round 1	Republic of Ireland 1 – 1 Soviet Union	Draw	Ronnie Whelan 38'
1988	Round 1	Republic of Ireland 0 – 1 Netherlands	Loss	
2012	Round 1	Republic of Ireland 1 – 3 Croatia	Loss	Sean St Ledger 19'
2012	Round 1	Spain 4 – 0 Republic of Ireland	Loss	
2012	Round 1	Italy 2 – 0 Republic of Ireland	Loss	
2016	Round 1	Republic of Ireland 1 – 1 Sweden	Draw	Wes Hoolahan 48'
2016	Round 1	Belgium 3 – 0 Republic of Ireland	Loss	
2016	Round 1	Italy 0 – 1 Republic of Ireland	Win	Robbie Brady 85'
2016	Round of 16	France 2 – 1 Republic of Ireland	Loss	Robbie Brady 2' (pen.)

=== UEFA Nations League ===
UEFA Nations League record
Season	League	Group	Round	Pos	Pld	W	D	L	GF	GA	P/R	RK
2018–19	B	4	Group stage	3rd	4	0	2	2	1	5	Same position	23rd
2020–21	B	4	Group stage	3rd	6	0	3	3	1	4	Same position	28th
2022–23	B	1	Group stage	3rd	6	2	1	3	8	7	Same position	26th
2024–25	B	2	Group stage	3rd	6	2	0	4	3	12	Same position	27th
2024–25	B	Relegation play-off		Winners	2	2	0	0	4	2	Same position	27th
2026–27	B	3	Group stage	2nd	6	2	2	2	9	5	TBD	24th
2026–27	B	Promotion play-off		TBD	0	0	0	0	0	0	TBD	24th
Total			Group stage	5/5	30	8	8	14	26	35	26th (average rank)	

*Denotes draws including knockout matches decided via penalty shoot-out.
**Gold background colour indicates that the tournament was won.
***Red border colour indicates tournament was held on home soil.

=== Other tournaments ===
Year	Position	Pld	W	D	L	GF	GA
(France) 1924 Olympics	5th	2	1	0	1	2	2
(United Kingdom) 1948 Olympics	17th	1	0	0	1	1	3
1972 Brazil Independence Cup	13th	4	2	0	2	7	7
(Japan) 1984 Kirin Cup	2nd	4	1	2	1	2	2
1986 Iceland Triangular Tournament	1st	2	2	0	0	3	1
(United States) 1992 U.S. Cup	3rd	3	1	0	2	3	5
(United States) 1996 U.S. Cup	2nd	3	1	1	1	6	4
(United States) 2000 U.S. Cup	2nd	3	1	2	0	5	4
(England) 2004 Unity Cup	2nd	2	1	0	1	1	3
(Republic of Ireland) 2011 Nations Cup	1st	3	3	0	0	9	0
Total		27	13	5	9	38	29

=== Penalty shoot-outs ===
In their history, Ireland have been involved in four penalty shoot-outs. They won their first, but since then they are on a losing streak of three. Their first two shoot-outs came in the World Cup rounds-of-16 in 1990 and 2002. Subsequent shoot-outs have taken place during the qualification playoff phases for Euro 2020 and the 2026 World Cup.

Competition / Round	Opponent	Result	Ireland goalkeeper	Ireland shooter
1990 FIFA World Cup / Round of 16	Romania	Won 5–4	Bonner	Sheedy
1990 FIFA World Cup / Round of 16	Romania	Won 5–4	Bonner	Houghton
1990 FIFA World Cup / Round of 16	Romania	Won 5–4	Bonner	Townsend
1990 FIFA World Cup / Round of 16	Romania	Won 5–4	Bonner	Cascarino
1990 FIFA World Cup / Round of 16	Romania	Won 5–4	Bonner	O'Leary
2002 FIFA World Cup / Round of 16	Spain	Lost 2–3	Given	Robbie Keane
2002 FIFA World Cup / Round of 16	Spain	Lost 2–3	Given	Holland
2002 FIFA World Cup / Round of 16	Spain	Lost 2–3	Given	Connolly
2002 FIFA World Cup / Round of 16	Spain	Lost 2–3	Given	Kilbane
2002 FIFA World Cup / Round of 16	Spain	Lost 2–3	Given	Finnan
UEFA Euro 2020 qualifying / Play-off semi-final	Slovakia	Lost 2–4	Randolph	Hourihane
UEFA Euro 2020 qualifying / Play-off semi-final	Slovakia	Lost 2–4	Randolph	Brady
UEFA Euro 2020 qualifying / Play-off semi-final	Slovakia	Lost 2–4	Randolph	Browne
UEFA Euro 2020 qualifying / Play-off semi-final	Slovakia	Lost 2–4	Randolph	Doherty
2026 FIFA World Cup qualification / Play-off semi-final	Czech Republic	Lost 3–4	Kelleher	Parrott
2026 FIFA World Cup qualification / Play-off semi-final	Czech Republic	Lost 3–4	Kelleher	Idah
2026 FIFA World Cup qualification / Play-off semi-final	Czech Republic	Lost 3–4	Kelleher	Brady
2026 FIFA World Cup qualification / Play-off semi-final	Czech Republic	Lost 3–4	Kelleher	Azaz
2026 FIFA World Cup qualification / Play-off semi-final	Czech Republic	Lost 3–4	Kelleher	Browne

=== Head-to-head records ===
The team's head-to-head records against all 85 nations whom they have played to date. Ireland have played against 85 of the 211 FIFA members: 55 UEFA, 8 CONMEBOL, 8 CAF, 7 CONCACAF, 6 AFC and 1 OFC members. The only UEFA member against whom Ireland have not played are Slovenia.

As of match played on 17 November 2026

Positive Record Neutral Record Negative Record

Opponent	Confederation	Played	Won	Drawn	Lost	GF	GA	GD	Win %	First match	Last match
Albania	UEFA	4	3	1	0	6	2	+4	75%	26 May 1992	7 June 2003
Algeria	CAF	2	1	0	1	3	2	+1	50%	28 April 1982	29 May 2010
Andorra	UEFA	5	5	0	0	15	3	+12	100%	28 March 2001	3 June 2021
Argentina	CONMEBOL	4	0	0	4	0	5	−5	0%	13 May 1951	11 August 2010
Armenia	UEFA	6	4	0	2	8	6	+2	60%	3 September 2010	14 October 2025
Australia	AFC	2	1	0	1	2	4	−2	50%	19 August 2003	12 August 2009
Austria	UEFA	18	3	5	10	21	40	−19	16.67%	7 May 1952	14 November 2026
Azerbaijan	UEFA	2	1	1	0	4	1	+3	50%	4 September 2021	9 October 2021
Belarus	UEFA	1	0	0	1	1	2	−1	0%	31 May 2016	31 May 2016
Belgium	UEFA	17	4	7	6	26	30	−4	23.53%	12 February 1928	23 March 2024
Bolivia	CONMEBOL	3	2	1	0	5	1	+4	66.67%	24 May 1994	26 May 2007
Bosnia and Herzegovina	UEFA	3	2	1	0	4	1	+3	66.67%	26 May 2012	16 November 2015
Brazil	CONMEBOL	6	1	1	4	2	12	−10	16.67%	5 May 1974	2 March 2010
Bulgaria	UEFA	15	6	6	3	19	12	+7	40%	28 May 1924	23 March 2025
Cameroon	CAF	1	0	1	0	1	1	0	0%	1 June 2002	1 June 2002
Canada	CONCACAF	2	1	1	0	4	1	+3	50%	18 November 2003	5 June 2026
Chile	CONMEBOL	6	2	1	3	6	6	0	33.33%	30 March 1960	24 May 2006
China	AFC	2	2	0	0	2	0	+2	100%	3 June 1984	29 March 2005
Colombia	CONMEBOL	1	1	0	0	1	0	+1	100%	29 May 2008	29 May 2008
Costa Rica	CONCACAF	1	0	1	0	1	1	0	0%	6 June 2014	6 June 2014
Croatia	UEFA	7	2	3	2	8	8	0	28.57%	2 June 1996	10 June 2012
Cyprus	UEFA	10	8	1	1	27	9	+18	80%	26 March 1980	5 September 2009
Czech Republic	UEFA	9	2	3	4	11	15	−4	25%	5 June 1994	26 March 2026
Czechoslovakia	UEFA	12	4	1	7	14	29	−15	33.33%	18 May 1938	27 May 1986
Denmark	UEFA	19	5	10	4	23	23	0	27.78%	3 October 1956	18 November 2019
Ecuador	CONMEBOL	2	1	1	0	4	3	+1	50%	18 June 1972	23 May 2007
Egypt	CAF	1	0	1	0	0	0	0	0%	17 June 1990	17 June 1990
England	UEFA	19	3	8	8	14	30	−16	15.79%	30 September 1946	17 November 2024
Estonia	UEFA	5	4	1	0	12	2	+10	80%	3 June 1924	15 November 2011
Faroe Islands	UEFA	4	4	0	0	11	1	+10	100%	13 October 2004	7 June 2013
Finland	UEFA	9	5	2	2	14	5	+9	55.56%	8 September 1949	14 November 2024
France	UEFA	19	4	5	10	15	25	−10	21.05%	23 May 1937	7 September 2023
Georgia	UEFA	11	9	2	0	18	5	+13	81.82%	29 March 2003	12 October 2019
Germany ^{a}	UEFA	20	6	5	9	24	35	−11	30%	8 May 1935	8 October 2015
Germany 'B'	UEFA	2	1	0	1	1	3	−2	50%	1 March 1975	21 May 1981
Gibraltar	UEFA	6	6	0	0	21	0	+21	100%	11 October 2014	16 October 2023
Greece	UEFA	7	0	1	6	1	10	−9	0%	26 April 2000	13 October 2024
Grenada	CONCACAF	1	1	0	0	5	0	+5	100%	16 May 2026	16 May 2026
Hungary	UEFA	15	4	7	4	23	26	−3	26.67%	15 December 1934	16 November 2025
Iceland	UEFA	8	5	2	1	16	7	+9	62.5%	12 August 1962	28 March 2017
Iran	AFC	3	2	0	1	4	2	+2	66.67%	11 June 1972	15 November 2001
Israel	UEFA	7	2	4	1	12	7	+5	28.57%	4 April 1984	4 October 2026
Italy	UEFA	14	3	3	8	10	20	−10	21.43%	21 March 1926	22 June 2016
Italy 'B'	UEFA	1	0	0	1	1	2	−1	0%	23 April 1927	23 April 1927
Jamaica	CONCACAF	1	1	0	0	1	0	+1	100%	2 June 2004	2 June 2004
Kazakhstan	UEFA	2	2	0	0	5	2	+3	100%	7 September 2012	15 October 2013
Kosovo	UEFA	2	1	0	1	3	1	+2	50%	24 September 2026	17 November 2026
Latvia	UEFA	6	6	0	0	17	3	+14	100%	9 September 1992	22 March 2023
Liechtenstein	UEFA	4	3	1	0	14	0	+14	75%	12 October 1994	21 May 1997
Lithuania	UEFA	5	4	1	0	6	1	+5	80%	16 June 1993	29 March 2022
Luxembourg	UEFA	8	6	1	1	17	3	+14	75%	9 May 1936	10 June 2025
North Macedonia	UEFA	7	4	2	1	11	5	+6	66.67%	9 October 1996	31 March 2026
Malta	UEFA	8	8	0	0	25	2	+23	100%	30 March 1983	20 November 2022
Mexico	CONCACAF	6	0	4	2	6	9	−3	0%	8 August 1984	2 June 2017
Moldova	UEFA	2	2	0	0	5	1	+4	100%	9 October 2016	6 October 2017
Montenegro	UEFA	2	0	2	0	0	0	0	0%	10 September 2008	14 October 2009
Morocco	CAF	1	1	0	0	1	0	+1	100%	12 September 1990	12 September 1990
Netherlands	UEFA	23	7	4	12	29	40	−11	29.17%	2 June 1924	19 November 2023
New Zealand	OFC	2	1	1	0	4	2	+2	50%	14 November 2019	21 November 2023
Nigeria	CAF	3	0	1	2	2	6	−4	0%	16 May 2002	29 May 2009
Northern Ireland	UEFA	11	4	5	2	17	4	+13	36.36%	20 September 1978	15 November 2018
Norway	UEFA	19	7	8	4	30	21	+9	36.84%	10 October 1937	17 November 2022
Oman	AFC	3	3	0	0	10	1	+9	100%	11 September 2012	31 August 2016
Paraguay	CONMEBOL	2	2	0	0	4	1	+3	100%	10 February 1999	25 May 2010
Poland	UEFA	28	6	11	11	30	44	−14	21.43%	22 May 1938	11 September 2018
Portugal	UEFA	18	5	3	10	13	26	−13	27.78%	16 June 1946	13 November 2025
Qatar	AFC	3	2	1	0	6	1	+5	66.67%	30 March 2021	28 May 2026
Romania	UEFA	5	2	2	1	4	2	+2	40%	23 March 1988	27 May 2004
Russia	UEFA	7	1	3	3	7	10	−3	14.29%	23 March 1994	6 September 2011
San Marino	UEFA	2	2	0	0	7	1	+6	100%	15 November 2006	7 February 2007
Saudi Arabia	AFC	1	1	0	0	3	0	+3	100%	11 June 2002	11 June 2002
Scotland	UEFA	13	5	3	5	13	14	−1	38.46%	3 May 1961	25 September 2022
Senegal	CAF	1	0	1	0	1	1	0	0%	6 June 2025	6 June 2025
Serbia ^{b}	UEFA	11	2	4	5	12	16	−4	18.18%	19 October 1955	7 September 2021
Slovakia	UEFA	6	1	5	0	6	5	+1	20%	28 March 2007	8 October 2020
South Africa	CAF	2	2	0	0	3	1	+2	100%	11 June 2000	8 September 2009
Soviet Union	UEFA	8	3	1	4	8	8	0	37.5%	18 October 1972	25 April 1990
Spain	UEFA	26	4	7	15	18	54	−36	15.38%	26 April 1931	11 June 2013
Sweden	UEFA	11	3	3	5	14	17	−3	27.27%	2 June 1949	13 June 2016
Switzerland	UEFA	19	8	4	7	19	14	+6	42.11%	5 May 1935	26 March 2024
Trinidad and Tobago	CONCACAF	1	0	0	1	1	2	−1	0%	30 May 1982	30 May 1982
Tunisia	CAF	1	1	0	0	4	0	+4	100%	19 October 1988	19 October 1988
Turkey	UEFA	14	5	6	3	27	16	+11	35.71%	16 November 1966	23 March 2018
United States	CONCACAF	10	6	2	2	22	14	+8	60%	14 June 1924	2 June 2018
Ukraine	UEFA	2	0	1	1	1	2	−1	0%	8 June 2022	14 June 2022
Uruguay	CONMEBOL	4	1	1	2	6	7	−1	25%	8 May 1974	4 June 2017
Wales	UEFA	19	6	5	8	18	19	−1	31.58%	28 September 1960	15 November 2020
Total		641	248	180	213	870	773	+97	38.69%	28 May 1924	17 November 2026

== Honours ==
=== Friendly ===
- Celtic Nations Cup
  - Champions (1): 2011
- Iceland Triangular Tournament
  - Champions (1): 1986

=== Awards ===
- FIFA Fair Play Award: 1997

== See also ==
- Republic of Ireland national football B team
- Republic of Ireland women's national football team
- Republic of Ireland national under-21 football team
- Republic of Ireland national under-19 football team
- Republic of Ireland national under-17 football team
- Republic of Ireland national beach soccer team
