= Troy Parrott =

Irish footballer (born 2002)

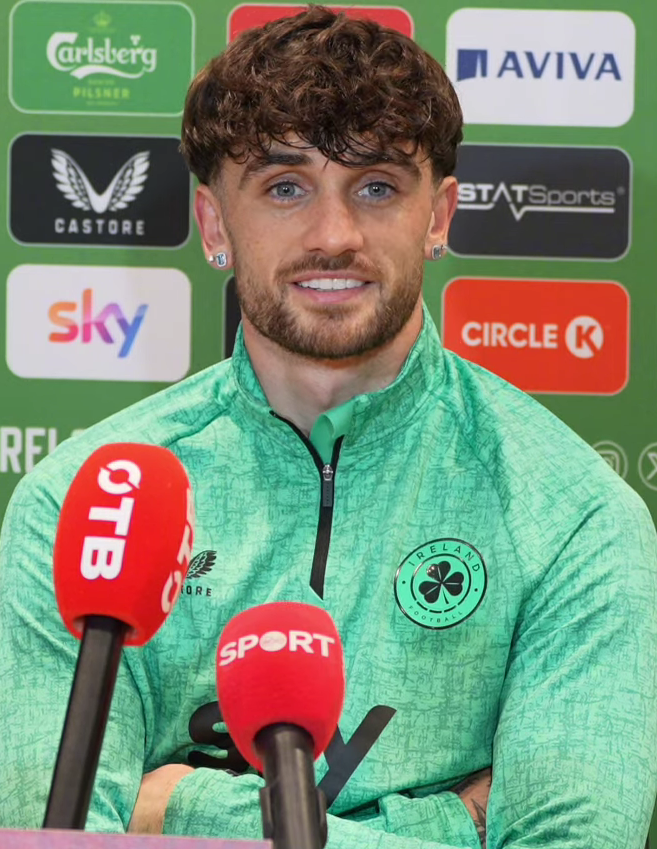
- Parrott with the Republic of Ireland in 2025

Personal information
- Full name: Troy Daniel Parrott
- Date of birth: 4 February 2002 (age 24)
- Place of birth: Dublin, Ireland
- Height: 6 ft 1 in (1.85 m)
- Position: Striker

Team information
- Current team: Betis
- Number: 19

Youth career
- –2017: Belvedere
- 2017–2019: Tottenham Hotspur

Senior career*
Years	Team	Apps	(Gls)
2019–2024	Tottenham Hotspur	2	(0)
2020–2021	→ Millwall (loan)	11	(0)
2021	→ Ipswich Town (loan)	18	(2)
2021–2022	→ Milton Keynes Dons (loan)	41	(8)
2022–2023	→ Preston North End (loan)	32	(3)
2023–2024	→ Excelsior (loan)	25	(10)
2024–2026	AZ	59	(30)
2026–	Real Betis	10	(1)

International career^{‡}
2017–2018	Republic of Ireland U17	11	(4)
2018–2019	Republic of Ireland U19	3	(4)
2019–2020	Republic of Ireland U21	5	(4)
2019–	Republic of Ireland	43	(17)
- * Club domestic league appearances and goals as of 20:32, 21 November 2026 (UTC) ‡ National team caps and goals as of 23:24, 17 November 2026 (UTC)

Troy Daniel Parrott (born 4 February 2002) is an Irish professional footballer who plays as a striker for La Liga club Real Betis and the Republic of Ireland national team.

== Club career ==
=== Tottenham Hotspur ===
From Dublin, Parrott started his youth career with Belvedere. He was first identified for Tottenham Hotspur by Martin McGuigan, the club's Republic of Ireland scout based in Newry. In July 2017, Parrott joined Tottenham Hotspur for an undisclosed fee. On 4 February 2019, on his 17th birthday, Parrott signed his first professional contract with Tottenham. He made his first-team debut for Tottenham in the 3–2 International Champions Cup friendly win over Juventus on 21 July 2019. On 24 September 2019, Parrott made his professional debut for Tottenham in their third round loss in the EFL Cup against Colchester United. On 7 December 2019, Parrott made his Premier League debut under manager José Mourinho, in a 5–0 win against Burnley. On 8 February 2020, Parrott signed a new three-and-a-half-year contract with Spurs until the summer of 2023, with an option to extend for an extra year.

==== Loan spells ====
On 1 August 2020, Parrott joined Championship side Millwall on a season-long loan. After missing the start of the season due to suffering a quad injury during pre-season, he made his debut for Millwall in a 0–2 EFL Cup defeat to Burnley on 23 September, a match in which he also suffered an ankle injury which ruled him out of action for over 8 weeks. He made his first appearance following his return from injury in a 1–1 draw with Cardiff City on 21 November. Parrott made 14 appearances in all competitions for Millwall before being recalled from his loan in January.

On 1 February 2021, Parrott joined League One club Ipswich Town for the remainder of the season. making his debut five days later in a 2–0 victory over Blackpool. He scored his first senior goal in a 1–0 home win over Plymouth Argyle at Portman Road on 13 March 2021. Parrott made 18 appearances during his loan spell with Ipswich, scoring twice.

On 29 July 2021, Parrott joined EFL League One club Milton Keynes Dons on loan for the 2021–22 season. He made his league debut for the club on 7 August 2021 in a 3–3 draw away to Bolton Wanderers. He scored his first goal the following week at home against Sunderland though MK Dons lost 2–1. On 8 March 2022, Parrott scored twice in a 3–1 home win over Cheltenham Town. He went on to make 47 appearances for the club, scoring ten goals and providing seven assists as Milton Keynes Dons secured a third-placed play-off finish.

On 25 July 2022, Tottenham Hotspur announced that Parrott had signed a new contract at the club until 2025 and was subsequently loaned out to Championship side Preston North End for the 2022–23 season. He scored his first goal for Preston in an EFL Cup win over Huddersfield Town on 9 August 2022. His first league goal for Preston North End was the winning goal in a 3–2 win over Norwich City at Carrow Road on 8 October 2022.

On 24 August 2023, Parrott was loaned out to Dutch club Excelsior Rotterdam on a season-long loan deal. Over the course of the season, he scored seventeen goals, including two hat-tricks in the relegation play-offs, but was unable to save the club from relegation.

=== AZ Alkmaar ===
Parrott signed for Eredivise club AZ Alkmaar from Tottenham Hotspur on 13 July 2024. The transfer fee paid to Tottenham was reported as £6.7 million (€8 million). Parrott scored four goals in AZ's 9–1 rout of Heerenveen on 14 September 2024. He was named the Eredivisie Player of the Month for December 2024. On 21 April 2025, he opened the scoring in the 2025 KNVB Cup final as AZ went on to lose to Go Ahead Eagles on penalties following a 1–1 draw after extra time. Parrott started off the 2025–26 season in good form, scoring 10 goals in his first 7 appearances, but had a knee ligament injury at the end of August that kept him out of action until October. Upon returning from injury, his excellent form continued and on 14 January 2026, Parrott scored a hat-trick and assisted another goal in a 6–0 victory over Ajax in the KNVB Cup. On 19 April 2026, he played in the 2026 KNVB Cup final and scored his 30th goal of the season in a 5–1 win over NEC Nijmegen.

=== Betis ===
On 20 August 2026, it was announced that Parrott had signed for La Liga club Real Betis on a five-year-contract for a fee believed to be in the region of €20 million. On 4 September 2026, he scored his first goal for the club in his home debut, with an 81st-minute winner in a 1–0 victory over his former manager José Mourinho's Real Madrid side. On 8 September 2026, Parrott made his UEFA Champions League debut in a 3–2 away win against Lille, scoring the winner for Betis.

== International career ==
=== Underage level ===
Parrott has represented the Republic of Ireland at under-17, under-19 and under-21 youth levels. On 6 September 2019, Parrott scored on his under-21 debut in an Under-21 European 2021 qualifier against Armenia. He followed that by getting a brace of goals in the next fixture against Sweden. His third under-21 appearance was a 0–0 draw with Italy in which he was sent off after being shown a second yellow card following an altercation with Italy's Moise Kean, who received a straight red card for pushing Parrott in the face.

=== Senior ===
Parrott made his senior Republic of Ireland debut on 14 November 2019, starting in a 3–1 friendly win against New Zealand and providing an assist for Ireland's second goal of the game which was Sean Maguire's first international goal. On 24 August 2020, he was named in the squad to face Finland and Bulgaria in the Nations League games in 2020. He made his first competitive appearance for Ireland as a substitute in a 0–0 draw with Bulgaria on 18 November 2020. Parrott scored his first senior international goals on 3 June 2021 when he scored two goals in a 4–1 win over Andorra in a friendly at the Estadi Nacional.

On 13 November 2025, he scored both of Ireland's goals in a 2–0 win over Portugal in a 2026 World Cup qualifier. Three days later, he netted a hat-trick, including a 96th-minute winner, in a 3–2 win away to Hungary, securing Ireland's place in the 2026 FIFA World Cup play-offs. He became the first ever Republic of Ireland player to score a hat-trick in an away game for the men's team and the first Irish player to score a competitive hat-trick for the men's team since Robbie Keane in 2014.

== Personal life ==
Parrott was born in Dublin, Ireland. From 2013 to 2017, he attended the O'Connell School in Dublin.

== Career statistics ==
=== Club ===
As of match played 21 November 2026

Appearances and goals by club, season and competition
Club	Season	League			National cup (Note: Includes FA Cup, KNVB Cup, Copa del Rey)		League cup (Note: Includes EFL Cup)		Europe		Other		Total	
Club	Season	Division	Apps	Goals	Apps	Goals	Apps	Goals	Apps	Goals	Apps	Goals	Apps	Goals
Tottenham Hotspur U21	2018–19	—			—		—		—		2 (Note: Appearances in EFL Trophy)	0	2	0
Tottenham Hotspur	2019–20	Premier League	2	0	1	0	1	0	0	0	—		4	0
Millwall (loan)	2020–21	Championship	11	0	2	0	1	0	—		—		14	0
Ipswich Town (loan)	2020–21	League One	18	2	—		—		—		—		18	2
Milton Keynes Dons (loan)	2021–22	League One	41	8	2	0	0	0	—		4 (Note: Two appearances and one goal in EFL Trophy, two appearances and one goal in League One play-offs)	2	47	10
Preston North End (loan)	2022–23	Championship	32	3	0	0	2	1	—		—		34	4
Excelsior (loan)	2023–24	Eredivisie	25	10	3	0	—		—		4 (Note: Appearances in Eredivisie relegation play-offs)	7	32	17
AZ	2024–25	Eredivisie	30	14	5	2	—		12 (Note: Appearances in UEFA Europa League)	4	—		47	20
AZ	2025–26	Eredivisie	28	16	5	5	—		15 (Note: Appearances in UEFA Conference League)	10	—		48	31
AZ	2026–27	Eredivisie	1	0	—		—		—		1 (Note: Appearance in Johan Cruyff Shield)	0	2	0
AZ	Total		59	30	10	7	—		27	14	1	0	97	51
Real Betis	2026–27	La Liga	10	1	0	0	—		4 (Note: Appearances in UEFA Champions League)	1	—		14	2
Career total			199	54	18	7	4	1	31	15	11	9	262	86

=== International ===
As of match played 17 November 2026

Appearances and goals by national team and year
National team	Year	Apps	Goals
Republic of Ireland	2019	1	0
Republic of Ireland	2020	1	0
Republic of Ireland	2021	8	2
Republic of Ireland	2022	7	2
Republic of Ireland	2023	4	0
Republic of Ireland	2024	5	1
Republic of Ireland	2025	7	5
Republic of Ireland	2026	10	7
Total		43	17

Scores and results list the Republic of Ireland's goal tally first, score column indicates score after each Parrott goal.

List of international goals scored by Troy Parrott
No.	Date	Venue	Opponent	Score	Result	Competition
1	3 June 2021	Estadi Nacional, Andorra la Vella, Andorra	Andorra	1–1	4–1	Friendly
2	3 June 2021	Estadi Nacional, Andorra la Vella, Andorra	Andorra	2–1	4–1	Friendly
3	29 March 2022	Aviva Stadium, Dublin, Ireland	Lithuania	1–0	1–0	Friendly
4	11 June 2022	Aviva Stadium, Dublin, Ireland	Scotland	2–0	3–0	2022–23 UEFA Nations League B
5	4 June 2024	Aviva Stadium, Dublin, Ireland	Hungary	2–1	2–1	Friendly
6	13 November 2025	Aviva Stadium, Dublin, Ireland	Portugal	1–0	2–0	2026 FIFA World Cup qualification
7	13 November 2025	Aviva Stadium, Dublin, Ireland	Portugal	2–0	2–0	2026 FIFA World Cup qualification
8	16 November 2025	Puskás Aréna, Budapest, Hungary	Hungary	1–1	3–2	2026 FIFA World Cup qualification
9	16 November 2025	Puskás Aréna, Budapest, Hungary	Hungary	2–2	3–2	2026 FIFA World Cup qualification
10	16 November 2025	Puskás Aréna, Budapest, Hungary	Hungary	3–2	3–2	2026 FIFA World Cup qualification
11	26 March 2026	Fortuna Arena, Prague, Czech Republic	Czech Republic	1–0	2–2 (a.e.t.) (3–4 p)	2026 FIFA World Cup qualification play-off
12	27 September 2026	Nagyerdei Stadion, Debrecen, Hungary	Israel	1–0	3–0	2026–27 UEFA Nations League B
13	1 October 2026	Aviva Stadium, Dublin, Ireland	Austria	1–0	2–2	2026–27 UEFA Nations League B
14	1 October 2026	Aviva Stadium, Dublin, Ireland	Austria	2–0	2–2	2026–27 UEFA Nations League B
15	4 October 2026	TSC Arena, Bačka Topola, Serbia	Israel	1–0	1–1	2026–27 UEFA Nations League B
16	17 November 2026	Aviva Stadium, Dublin, Ireland	Kosovo	1–0	3–0	2026–27 UEFA Nations League B
17	17 November 2026	Aviva Stadium, Dublin, Ireland	Kosovo	2–0	3–0	2026–27 UEFA Nations League B

== Honours ==
AZ

- KNVB Cup: 2025–26
- Johan Cruyff Shield: 2026

Individual

- FAI Under-15 International Player of the Year: 2017
- FAI Under-16 International Player of the Year: 2018
- FAI International Goal of the Year: 2019, 2021
- Eredivisie Team of the Month: September 2024
- Eredivisie Player of the Month: December 2024
