= List of Republic of Ireland national football team hat-tricks =

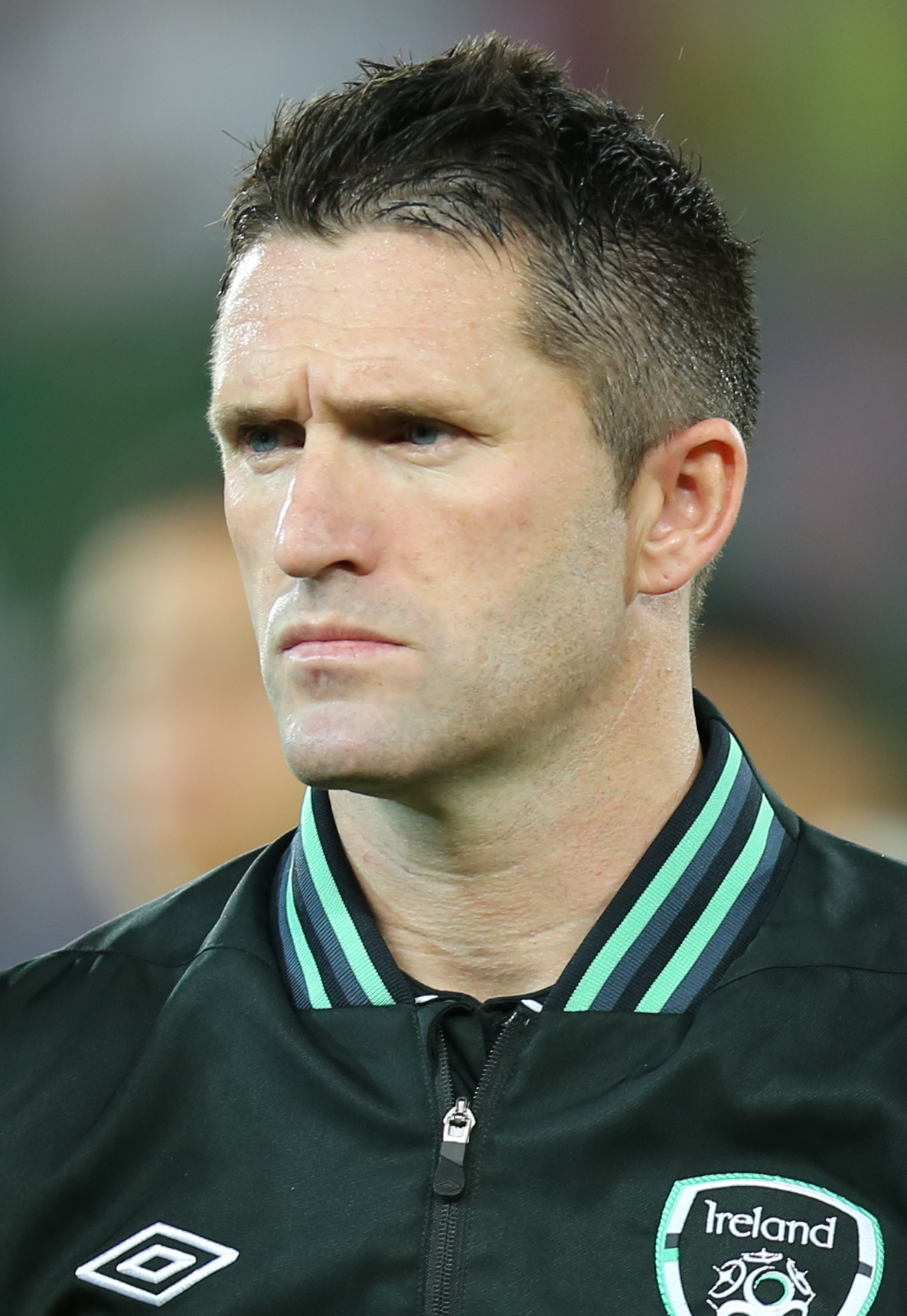
Robbie Keane has scored more hat-tricks for the Republic of Ireland than any other player.

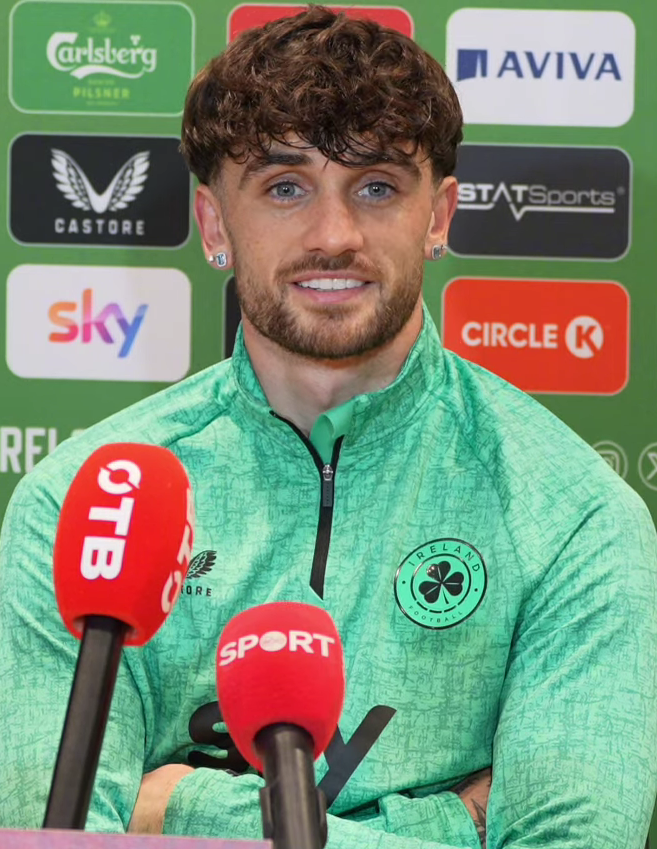
Troy Parrott scored a hat-trick against Hungary in 2025; it was the only one scored in a away fixture.

The Republic of Ireland national football team played their first international association football match on 28 May 1924 as the Irish Free State, defeating Bulgaria 1–0 at the 1924 Summer Olympics. The Irish Free State side was established following the partition of the country in 1921. Prior to this a unified Irish team had represented the whole of Ireland in international football.

As of May 2026, eleven male Irish international players have scored a hat-trick (three goals) or more in a game. The first player to achieve the feat was Ned Brooks on 16 June 1924 against the United States. Two players have scored four goals during a match, Paddy Moore against Belgium in 1934, the only match which Ireland have failed to win when one of their players has scored a hat-trick, and Don Givens against Turkey in 1975. Other than Brooks, five players have scored a single hat-trick for Ireland, John Joe Flood in 1929, David Kelly on his international debut in 1987, David Connolly in 1997, Callum Robinson in 2021, Troy Parrott in 2025, and Jack Moylan in 2026. Don Givens is also one of three male players to have scored more than one hat-trick for Ireland, the others being John Aldridge (2) and Robbie Keane (3).

The Republic of Ireland have conceded eight hat-tricks during their history, the first being scored by Karl-Erik Palmér in a 1950 FIFA World Cup qualification match on 13 November 1949 against Sweden. No player has ever scored more than three goals against Ireland in a single match. Christian Eriksen of Denmark is the most recent player to score a hat-trick against the Republic of Ireland, in a 2018 FIFA World Cup qualification match.

== Hat-tricks for the Republic of Ireland ==
Key

More than a hat-trick scored *

Table

Wartime internationals, not regarded as official matches, are not included in the list. The result is presented with Republic of Ireland's score first.

Date	Goals	Player	Opponent	Venue	Competition	Result	Ref.
16 June 1924	3	Ned Brooks	United States	Dalymount Park, Dublin	Friendly	3–1	
20 April 1929	3	John Joe Flood	Belgium	Dalymount Park, Dublin	Friendly	4–0	
25 February 1934	4*	Paddy Moore	Belgium	Dalymount Park, Dublin	1934 FIFA World Cup qualification	4–4	
30 October 1974	3	Don Givens	Soviet Union	Dalymount Park, Dublin	UEFA Euro 1976 qualifying	3–0	
29 October 1975	4*	Don Givens	Turkey	Dalymount Park, Dublin	UEFA Euro 1976 qualifying	4–0	
10 November 1987	3	David Kelly (Note: International début)	Israel	Dalymount Park, Dublin	Friendly	5–0	
17 October 1990	3	John Aldridge	Turkey	Lansdowne Road, Dublin	UEFA Euro 1992 qualifying	5–0	
9 September 1992	3	John Aldridge	Latvia	Lansdowne Road, Dublin	1994 FIFA World Cup qualification	4–0	
21 May 1997	3	David Connolly	Liechtenstein	Lansdowne Road, Dublin	1998 World Cup qualification	5–0	
15 November 2006	3	Robbie Keane	San Marino	Aviva Stadium, Dublin	UEFA Euro 2008 qualifying	5–0	
7 June 2013	3	Robbie Keane	Faroe Islands	Aviva Stadium, Dublin	2014 FIFA World Cup qualification	3–0	
11 October 2014	3	Robbie Keane	Gibraltar	Aviva Stadium, Dublin	UEFA Euro 2016 qualifying	7–0	
12 October 2021	3	Callum Robinson	Qatar	Aviva Stadium, Dublin	Friendly	4–0	
16 November 2025	3	Troy Parrott	Hungary	Puskás Aréna, Budapest	2026 FIFA World Cup qualification	3–2	
16 May 2026	3	Jack Moylan	Grenada	Estadio Nueva Condomina, Murcia	Friendly	5–0	

== Hat-tricks conceded by the Republic of Ireland ==
Wartime internationals, not regarded as official matches, are not included in the list. The result is presented with Republic of Ireland's score first.

Date	Goals	Player	Opponent	Venue	Competition	Result	Ref.
13 November 1949	3	Karl-Erik Palmér	Sweden	Dalymount Park, Dublin	1950 FIFA World Cup qualification	1–3	
10 May 1950	3	Joseph Mermans	Belgium	King Baudouin Stadium, Brussels	Friendly	1–5	
7 May 1952	3	Adolf Huber	Austria	Praterstadion, Vienna	Friendly	0–6	
19 October 1955	3	Miloš Milutinović	Yugoslavia	Dalymount Park, Dublin	Friendly	0–6	
8 May 1957	3	Tommy Taylor	England	Wembley Stadium, London	1958 FIFA World Cup qualification	1–5	
27 October 1965	3	Chus Pereda	Spain	Ramón Sánchez Pizjuán Stadium, Seville	1966 FIFA World Cup qualification	1–4	
7 October 1969	3	Jozef Adamec	Czechoslovakia	Stadion Letná, Prague	1970 FIFA World Cup qualification	0–3	
10 October 1971	3	Thomas Parits	Austria	Linzer Stadion, Linz	UEFA Euro 1972 qualifying	0–6	
6 September 1995	3	Peter Stöger	Austria	Ernst-Happel-Stadion, Vienna	UEFA Euro 1996 qualifying	1–3	
14 November 2017	3	Christian Eriksen	Denmark	Aviva Stadium, Dublin	2018 FIFA World Cup qualification	1–5	
