= Noel King =

Noel King may refer to:

- Noel King (footballer) (born 1956), Irish footballer and manager
- Noel King (broadcast journalist) (fl. 2004–2021), American broadcast journalist

== See also ==
- Noel Kingsbury, British garden designer and writer
