= 1961–62 Sunderland A.F.C. season =

English football club season

Sunderland
1961–62 season
- Chairman: Syd Collings
- Manager: Alan Brown
- Stadium: Roker Park
- Division Two: 3rd
- FA Cup: Round 4
- League Cup: Round 5
- Top goalscorer: League: Clough (29); All: Clough (34)
- Highest home attendance: 57,666 vs Newcastle United (21 April)
- Lowest home attendance: 21,706 vs Charlton Athletic (14 March)
- Average home league attendance: 32,982
- Biggest win: 7-2 vs Swansea Town (9 December)
- Biggest defeat: 1-4 vs Liverpool (30 August)
Home colours	Away colours

The 1961–62 season was Sunderland's 78th year in existence and 4th consecutive season in the Division Two. Also the club competed in the FA Cup and the League Cup.

== Summary ==
During June, Northern Irish Forward Ian Lawther was transferred out to Blackburn Rovers. Also Johnny Goodchild and Jackie Maltby left the club. In July 1961, one of Clough's transfer requests was finally accepted and he moved to Boro's local rivals Sunderland for £55,000. However, a poor start and a final day draw at Swansea saw the team finish third, a point behind Leyton Orient and nine points behind deserved champions Liverpool led by the inspirational Bill Shankly.

== Squad ==
Note: Flags indicate national team as defined under FIFA eligibility rules; some limited exceptions apply. Players may hold more than one non-FIFA nationality.

Pos.	Nation	Player
GK	ENG	Peter Wakeham
GK	ENG	Jimmy Montgomery
GK	ENG	Keith Hird
DF	ENG	Cec Irwin
DF	IRL	Charlie Hurley
DF	SCO	Jimmy McNab
DF	ENG	Len Ashurst
DF	ENG	Dickie Rooks
DF	ENG	Colin Nelson
DF	NIR	Martin Harvey
MF	ENG	Harry Hooper
MF	ENG	Stan Anderson (c)
MF	SCO	George Herd

Pos.	Nation	Player
MF	ENG	Joe Kiernan
MF	ENG	Jack Overfield
MF	ENG	Jimmy Davison
MF	SCO	John Dillon
MF	SCO	Danny Hegan
MF	ENG	Alan Sproates
FW	SCO	Willie McPheat
FW	ENG	Brian Clough
FW	IRL	Amby Fogarty
FW	NIR	Jimmy O'Neill
FW	SCO	Nick Sharkey
FW	ENG	Ally Murray
FW	ENG	Colin Rutherford

=== Transfers ===
In
Pos.	Name	from	Type
FW	Brian Clough	Middlesbrough	£55,000
FW	George Herd	Clyde F.C.	

Out
Pos.	Name	To	Type
FW	Ian Lawther	Blackburn Rovers	£18,000
FW	Johnny Goodchild	Brighton & Hove Albion	
FW	Jackie Maltby	Darlington F.C.	
MF	Reg Pearce	Luton Town F.C.	

== Results ==
=== Division One ===
==== League table ====
Pos	Team	Pld	W	D	L	GF	GA	GAv	Pts	Qualification or relegation
1	Liverpool (C, P)	42	27	8	7	99	43	2.302	62	Promotion to the First Division
2	Leyton Orient (P)	42	22	10	10	69	40	1.725	54	Promotion to the First Division
3	Sunderland	42	22	9	11	85	50	1.700	53	
4	Scunthorpe United	42	21	7	14	86	71	1.211	49	
5	Plymouth Argyle	42	19	8	15	75	75	1.000	46	

Rules for classification: 1) Points; 2) Goal average; 3) Goals scored
(C) Champions; (P) Promoted

==== Results by round ====
Round	1	2	3	4	5	6	7	8	9	10	11	12	13	14	15	16	17	18	19	20	21	22	23	24	25	26	27	28	29	30	31	32	33	34	35	36	37	38	39	40	41	42
Ground	A	A	H	H	A	H	A	A	H	H	A	A	H	A	H	A	H	A	H	A	H	H	A	A	H	A	H	A	H	H	A	H	A	H	H	A	H	A	H	H	A	A
Result	L	L	W	L	W	W	L	L	W	W	D	D	W	W	W	D	W	L	D	D	W	W	L	L	W	L	W	L	D	W	D	W	L	D	W	W	W	W	W	W	W	D
Position	16	21	17	20	17	15	18	19	17	13	13	11	8	4	3	3	3	6	5	5	3	3	3	4	5	7	5	7	6	7	7	7	7	6	5	4	4	3	3	3	2	3

Source: https://www.11v11.com/teams/sunderland/tab/matches/season/1962/
A = Away; H = Home; W = Win; D = Draw; L = Loss; = Champions, Promoted to 1962-63 Division One; = Promoted to 1962-63 Division One; = Relegated to 1962-63 Division Three

==== Matches ====
- .- Source: https://www.11v11.com/teams/sunderland/tab/matches/season/1962/

19 August 1961 1	Walsall	4-3	Sunderland	Walsall
	Richards 13' (pen.), 65', 73'; Wilson 42'	16	Clough 22'; Herd 31'; Hooper 55' (pen.)	Stadium: Fellows Park; Attendance: 18,420; Referee: FV Stringer

23 August 1961 2	Liverpool	3-0	Sunderland	Liverpool
	Hunt 48', 83'; Lewis 78'	21		Stadium: Anfield; Attendance: 48,963; Referee: W Clements

26 August 1961 3	Sunderland	2-1	Stoke City	Sunderland
	Fogarty 51', 67'	17	Adam 2'	Stadium: Roker Park; Attendance: 34,183; Referee: J Parkinson

30 August 1961 4	Sunderland	1-4	Liverpool	Sunderland
	Clough 43'	20	Hunt 26', 29'; St John 39', 90'	Stadium: Roker Park; Attendance: 47,261; Referee: LJ Tirebuck

2 September 1961 5	Bristol Rovers	2-3	Sunderland	Bristol
	Bradford 47', 89'	17	McPheat 2'; Fogarty 13'; Sykes 78' (o.g.)	Stadium: Eastville Stadium; Attendance: 12,214; Referee: JK Taylor

9 September 1961 6	Sunderland	2-1	Leeds United	Sunderland
	Clough 7', 31'	15	McCole 83'	Stadium: Roker Park; Attendance: 30,737; Referee: W Crossley

16 September 1961 7	Norwich City	3-1	Sunderland	Norwich
	Savino 72'; Conway 74'; Hill 89'	18	McPheat 79'	Stadium: Carrow Road; Attendance: 21,910; Referee: KG Aston

19 September 1961 8	Bury	3-2	Sunderland	Bury
	Holden 20'; Watson 33'; Beaumont 59'	19	Clough 53'; McNab 63'	Stadium: Gigg Lane; Attendance: 17,095; Referee: AW Sparling

23 September 1961 9	Sunderland	4-0	Scunthorpe United	Sunderland
	Herd 20', 30'; Fogarty 35', 77'	17		Stadium: Roker Park; Attendance: 35,112; Referee: F Cowen

27 September 1961 10	Sunderland	3-0	Bury	Sunderland
	Clough 28', 34', 87'	13		Stadium: Roker Park; Attendance: 39,893

30 September 1961 11	Brighton & Hove Albion	1-1	Sunderland	Brighton
	Nicholas 69'	13	Hurley 29'	Stadium: Goldstone Ground; Attendance: 17,070; Referee: DW Smith

7 October 1961 12	Derby County	1-1	Sunderland	Derby
	Curry 71'	11	Hurley 89'	Stadium: Baseball Ground; Attendance: 16,452; Referee: G McCabe

14 October 1961 13	Sunderland	2-1	Leyton Orient	Sunderland
	Clough 27', 52'	8	Dunmore 10'	Stadium: Roker Park; Attendance: 36,870; Referee: J Kelly

21 October 1961 14	Preston North End	1-0	Sunderland	Preston
	Hurley 74'	4		Stadium: Deepdale; Attendance: 17,973; Referee: JE Carr

28 October 1961 15	Sunderland	5-0	Plymouth Argyle	Sunderland
	Hooper 9', 71' (pen.); Clough 22', 43', 54'	3		Stadium: Roker Park; Attendance: 30,023; Referee: E Crawford

4 November 1961 16	Huddersfield Town	0-0	Sunderland	Huddersfield
		3		Stadium: Leeds Road; Attendance: 19,017; Referee: J Mitchell

11 November 1961 17	Sunderland	2-1	Middlesbrough	Sunderland
	Hooper 15'; Herd 26'	3	Kaye 57' (pen.)	Stadium: Roker Park; Attendance: 48,428; Referee: H Richards

18 November 1961 18	Southampton	2-0	Sunderland	Southampton
	O'Brien 25'; Reeves 87'	6		Stadium: The Dell; Attendance: 16,690; Referee: RE Smith

25 November 1961 19	Sunderland	2-2	Luton Town	Sunderland
	Hooper 17' (pen.); Clough 70'	5	Ashworth 58'; Pacey 89'	Stadium: Roker Park; Attendance: 32,763; Referee: AW Luty

2 December 1961 20	Newcastle United	2-2	Sunderland	Newcastle-upon-Tyne
	White 18'; McGuigan 68'	5	Clough 65', 81'	Stadium: St James' Park; Attendance: 53,991; Referee: V James

9 December 1961 21	Sunderland	7-2	Swansea Town	Sunderland
	Fogarty 23', 36', 89'; Clough 55', 68', 69'; Hooper 87'	3	Reynolds 22'; Williams 64' (pen.)	Stadium: Roker Park; Attendance: 27,560; Referee: P Rhodes

16 December 1961 22	Sunderland	3-0	Walsall	Sunderland
	Overfield 46', 68'; Clough 73'	3		Stadium: Roker Park; Attendance: 30,690; Referee: H Webb

23 December 1961 23	Stoke City	1-0	Sunderland	Stoke-on-Trent
	Asprey 82'	3		Stadium: Victoria Ground; Attendance: 25,273; Referee: J Parkinson

26 December 1961 24	Charlton Athletic	2-0	Sunderland	Charlton
	Bailey 5'; Matthews 64'	4		Stadium: The Valley; Attendance: 18,342; Referee: TW Dawes

13 January 1962 25	Sunderland	6-1	Bristol Rovers	Sunderland
	Hooper 30' (pen.); O'Neill 35', 85'; McNab 61'; Bumpstead 73' (o.g.); McPheat 89'	5	Jarman 4'	Stadium: Roker Park; Attendance: 32,650; Referee: JS Pickles

20 January 1962 26	Leeds United	1-0	Sunderland	Leeds
	Smith 42'	7		Stadium: Elland Road; Attendance: 17,763; Referee: KR Tuck

3 February 1962 27	Sunderland	2-0	Norwich City	Sunderland
	O'Neill 37'; McPheat 89'	5		Stadium: Roker Park; Attendance: 26,643; Referee: NN Hough

10 February 1962 28	Scunthorpe United	3-1	Sunderland	Scunthorpe
	McGuigan 29'; Kaye 34'; Godfrey 75'	7	Overfield 40'	Stadium: Old Show Ground; Attendance: 11,656; Referee: KA Collinge

17 February 1962 29	Sunderland	0-0	Brighton & Hove Albion	Sunderland
		6		Stadium: Roker Park; Attendance: 22,575; Referee: JE Carr

24 February 1962 30	Sunderland	2-1	Derby County	Sunderland
	Hurley 15'; Herd 26'	7	Curry 50'	Stadium: Roker Park; Attendance: 22,143; Referee: J Mitchell
Note: Goalkeeper Jimmy Montgomery first match as Division Two starter.

3 March 1962 31	Leyton Orient	1-1	Sunderland	Leyton (London)
	Deeley 55'	7	McPheat 2'	Stadium: Brisbane Road; Attendance: 19,972; Referee: FV Stringer

14 March 1962 32	Sunderland	4-1	Charlton Athletic	Sunderland
	Herd 33', 74'; O'Neill 50'; Anderson 87'	7	Anderson 88' (o.g.)	Stadium: Roker Park; Attendance: 21,706; Referee: GW Grundy

17 March 1962 33	Plymouth Argyle	3-2	Sunderland	Plymouth
	Kirby 21'; Carter 68', 82'	7	O'Neill 6', 13'	Stadium: Home Park; Attendance: 16,726; Referee: Fl.Lt. Mason

21 March 1962 34	Sunderland	0-0	Preston North End	Sunderland
		6		Stadium: Roker Park; Attendance: 21,714; Referee: V James

24 March 1962 35	Sunderland	3-1	Huddersfield Town	Sunderland
	Clough 8', 21', 61'	5	Balderstone 75'	Stadium: Roker Park; Attendance: 26,412; Referee: W Crossley

31 March 1962 36	Middlesbrough	0-1	Sunderland	Middlesbrough
		4	Clough 34'	Stadium: Ayresome Park; Attendance: 35,666; Referee: A Edge

7 April 1962 37	Sunderland	3-0	Southampton	Sunderland
	Clough 5'; Herd 69'; Hooper 75'	4		Stadium: Roker Park; Attendance: 28,865; Referee: K Dagnall
Note: Goalkeeper Peter Wakeham last match of the season as Division Two starter.

14 April 1962 38	Luton Town	1-2	Sunderland	Luton
	Pacey 7'	3	Overfield 48'; Harvey 71'	Stadium: Kenilworth Road; Attendance: 9,571; Referee: CW Kingston

21 April 1962 39	Sunderland	3-0	Newcastle United	Sunderland
	Herd 19', 82'; McPheat 76'	3		Stadium: Roker Park; Attendance: 57,666; Referee: AW Luty

23 April 1962 40	Sunderland	4-0	Rotherham United	Sunderland
	Hooper 8'; Hurley 58'; McPheat 61'; Clough 74'	3		Stadium: Roker Park; Attendance: 38,903; Referee: J Parkinson

24 April 1962 41	Rotherham United	0-3	Sunderland	Rotherham
	Lancaster 40'	2	Clough 68', 83'; Hurley 71'	Stadium: Millmoor; Attendance: 8,674; Referee: LJ Hamer

28 April 1962 42	Swansea Town	1-1	Sunderland	Swansea
	Reynolds 66'	3	Clough 20'; McNab 81	Stadium: Vetch Field; Attendance: 18,071; Referee: JK Taylor
Note: Swansea Town avoided relegation to Division Three by clinching the draw.

=== League Cup ===
13 September 1961 1	Bolton Wanderers	1-1	Sunderland	Bolton
	Stevens 13'		Fogarty 29'	Stadium: Burnden Park; Attendance: 13,125

25 September 1961 replay	Sunderland	1-0	Bolton Wanderers	Sunderland
	Clough 24'			Stadium: Roker Park; Attendance: 19,557; Referee: AW Sparling

4 October 1961 2	Sunderland	5-2	Walsall	Sunderland
	Clough 43', 67', 87'; McNab 46'; Hill 86' (o.g.)		Taylor 19', 68'	Stadium: Roker Park; Attendance: 29,558; Referee: J Powell

15 November 1961 3	Sunderland	2-1	Hull City	Sunderland
	Herd 61'; Hooper 69' (pen.)		McSeveney 37'	Stadium: Roker Park; Attendance: 15,969; Referee: W Crossley

13 December 1961 4	bye

7 February 1962 5	Sunderland	1-4	Norwich City	Sunderland
	Clough 70'		Burton 17'; Hill 53'; Lythgoe 77'; McCrohan 87'	Stadium: Roker Park; Attendance: 17,813; Referee: A Holland

=== FA Cup ===
6 January 1962 Round 3	Southampton	2-2	Sunderland	Southampton
	O'Brien 21' (pen.), 62'		Hooper 38' (pen.); Anderson 59'	Stadium: The Dell; Attendance: 22,248; Referee: P Bye

10 January 1962 replay	Sunderland	3-0	Southampton	Sunderland
	McPheat 14'; Herd 59', 70'			Stadium: Roker Park; Attendance: 58,527; Referee: P Bye

27 January 1962 Round 4	Sunderland	0-0	Port Vale	Sunderland
				Stadium: Roker Park; Attendance: 49,468; Referee: HP Hackney

31 January 1962 replay	Port Vale	3-1	Sunderland	Burslem (Stoke-on-Trent)
	Jackson 37'; Poole 49'; Longbottom 80'		McPheat 87'	Stadium: Vale Park; Attendance: 28,226; Referee: HP Hackney

== Statistics ==
=== Squad statistics ===
No.	Pos	Nat	Player	Total		Football League Division Two		FA Cup		Football League Cup	
No.	Pos	Nat	Player	Apps	Goals	Apps	Goals	Apps	Goals	Apps	Goals
	GK	(England) ENG	Peter Wakeham	38	0	30	0	4	0	4	0
	DF	(England) ENG	Cec Irwin	40	0	33	0	4	0	3	0
	DF	(Republic of Ireland) IRL	Charlie Hurley	42	6	33	6	4	0	5	0
	DF	(Scotland) SCO	Jimmy McNab	51	3	42	2	4	0	5	1
	DF	(England) ENG	Len Ashurst	51	0	42	0	4	0	5	0
	MF	(Scotland) SCO	George Herd	39	13	32	10	4	2	3	1
	MF	(England) ENG	Stan Anderson	46	2	38	1	4	1	4	0
	FW	(England) ENG	Harry Hooper	41	11	33	9	3	1	5	1
	FW	(Scotland) SCO	Willie McPheat	37	9	29	7	4	2	4	0
	FW	(England) ENG	Brian Clough	43	34	34	29	4	0	5	5
	FW	(England) ENG	Jack Overfield	48	4	40	4	4	0	4	0
	GK	(England) ENG	Jimmy Montgomery	13	0	12	0	0	0	1	0
	FW	(Republic of Ireland) IRL	Amby Fogarty	27	9	24	8	0	0	3	1
	DF	(England) ENG	Dickie Rooks	9	0	9	0	0	0	0	0
	DF	(England) ENG	Colin Nelson	11	0	9	0	0	0	2	0
	FW	(England) ENG	Jimmy Davison	11	0	9	0	1	0	1	0
	FW	(Northern Ireland) NIR	Jimmy O'Neill	7	6	7	6	0	0	0	0
	DF	(Northern Ireland) NIR	Martin Harvey	5	1	4	1	0	0	1	0
	MF	(Scotland) SCO	John Dillon	1	0	1	0	0	0	0	0
	FW	(Scotland) SCO	Nick Sharkey	1	0	1	0	0	0	0	0
	MF	(Scotland) SCO	Danny Hegan	0	0	0	0	0	0	0	0
	MF	(England) ENG	Alan Sproates	0	0	0	0	0	0	0	0
	FW	(England) ENG	Ally Murray	0	0	0	0	0	0	0	0
	FW	(England) ENG	Colin Rutherford	0	0	0	0	0	0	0	0
	GK	(England) ENG	Keith Hird								
	MF	(England) ENG	Joe Kiernan								

- Source: https://www.11v11.com/teams/sunderland/tab/players/season/1962/
