= 1962–63 Sunderland A.F.C. season =

English football club season

Sunderland
1962–63 season
- Chairman: Syd Collings
- Manager: Alan Brown
- Stadium: Roker Park
- Division Two: 3rd
- FA Cup: Round 5
- League Cup: Semifinals
- Top goalscorer: League: Brian Clough (24); All: Clough (28)
Home colours	Away colours

The 1962–63 season was Sunderland's 79th year in existence and 8th consecutive season in the Division Two. Also the club competed in the FA Cup and the League Cup.

== Summary ==
During June, Northern Irish Forward Johnny Crossan was transferred in from Standard Liege. Also, Scottish left winger George Mulhall arrived from Aberdeen F.C. Center Forward Brian Clough started the season in good form with 24 goals in 24 matches. However, on 26 December 1962 against Bury, in the 27th minute, Brian Clough was injured in a collision with the Bury goalkeeper Chris Harker. Torn ligaments kept him out for the rest of the season and ultimately ended his brilliant playing career. In a season heavily impacted by the "big freeze" of 1963, on the final day, Sunderland needed only a single point to secure promotion to First Division, but Tommy Harmer's goal left the door open for Chelsea, still 2 points behind but with a game in hand and a better goal average. They took their chance emphatically, beating Portsmouth 7–0 at home the following Tuesday.

== Squad ==
Note: Flags indicate national team as defined under FIFA eligibility rules; some limited exceptions apply. Players may hold more than one non-FIFA nationality.

Pos.	Nation	Player
GK	ENG	Jimmy Montgomery
GK	ENG	Keith Hird
DF	ENG	Colin Nelson
DF	SCO	Jimmy McNab
DF	IRL	Charlie Hurley
DF	ENG	Len Ashurst
DF	ENG	Cec Irwin
DF	NIR	Martin Harvey
DF	ENG	Dickie Rooks
DF	SCO	Joe Kiernan
DF	ENG	Jimmy Nelson
MF	ENG	George Herd
MF	ENG	Tommy Mitchinson

Pos.	Nation	Player
MF	ENG	Stan Anderson (c)
MF	ENG	Jimmy Davison
MF	SCO	George Mulhall
MF	ENG	Harry Hooper
MF	NIR	Norman Clarke
MF	ENG	Jack Overfield
FW	IRL	Amby Fogarty
FW	NIR	Johnny Crossan
FW	ENG	Brian Clough
FW	SCO	Nick Sharkey
FW	SCO	Andy Kerr
FW	SCO	Willie McPheat

=== Transfers ===
In
Pos.	Name	from	Type
MF	George Mulhall	Aberdeen F.C.	
FW	Johnny Crossan	Standard Liege	
FW	Andy Kerr	Kilmarnock F.C.	
MF	Norman Clarke	Ballymena United	

Out
Pos.	Name	To	Type
GK	Peter Wakeham	Charlton Athletic	
MF	John Dillon	Brighton and Hove Albion	
MF	Danny Hegan	Ipswich Town	
MF	Alan Sproates	Swindon Town	
FW	Jimmy O'Neill	Walsall F.C.	
FW	Ally Murray		
FW	Colin Rutherford		

== Results ==
=== Division One ===
==== League table ====
Pos	Team	Pld	W	D	L	GF	GA	GAv	Pts	Qualification or relegation
1	Stoke City (C, P)	42	20	13	9	73	50	1.460	53	Promotion to the First Division
2	Chelsea (P)	42	24	4	14	81	42	1.929	52	Promotion to the First Division
3	Sunderland	42	20	12	10	84	55	1.527	52	
4	Middlesbrough	42	20	9	13	86	85	1.012	49	
5	Leeds United	42	19	10	13	79	53	1.491	48	

Rules for classification: 1) Points; 2) Goal average; 3) Goals scored
(C) Champions; (P) Promoted

==== Results by round ====
Round	1	2	3	4	5	6	7	8	9	10	11	12	13	14	15	16	17	18	19	20	21	22	23	24	25	26	27	28	29	30	31	32	33	34	35	36	37	38	39	40	41	42
Ground	H	H	A	A	H	H	A	H	H	A	H	H	A	H	A	H	A	H	A	H	A	A	H	H	A	A	H	A	H	A	H	A	H	H	A	A	H	A	H	A	A	H
Result	W	W	L	D	W	W	L	L	W	W	D	W	D	W	L	W	D	W	L	W	W	D	W	L	L	D	D	W	W	W	D	D	D	W	L	L	D	D	W	W	W	L
Position	6	3	6	5	7	2	4	6	7	4	6	4	3	2	4	3	3	3	5	4	2	2	2	2	3	2	2	2	2	1	1	3	3	3	3	3	3	3	3	2	1	2

Source: https://www.11v11.com/teams/middlesbrough/tab/matches/season/1961/
A = Away; H = Home; W = Win; D = Draw; L = Loss; = Champions, Promoted to 1963-64 Division One; = Promoted to 1963-64 Division One; = Relegated to 1963-64 Division Three

==== Matches ====
- .- Source: https://www.11v11.com/teams/sunderland/tab/matches/season/1963/

18 August 1962 1	Sunderland	3-1	Middlesbrough	Sunderland
	Brian Clough 36', 70'; Charlie Hurley 66'	6	(yellow card) 60' Bryan Orritt; 78' Ron Burbeck	Stadium: Roker Park; Attendance: 48,106; Referee: G McCabe

22 August 1962 2	Sunderland	1-0	Charlton Athletic	Sunderland
	Willie McPheat 71'	3		Stadium: Roker Park; Attendance: 37,028; Referee: MA Fussey

25 August 1962 3	Leeds United	0-1	Sunderland	Leeds
	Billy Bremner 57'	6		Stadium: Elland Road; Attendance: 17,755; Referee: RJ Simons

28 August 1962 4	Charlton Athletic	2-2	Sunderland	Charlton
	Brian Kinsey 60', 71'	5	2' Jimmy McNab; 56' Brian Clough	Stadium: The Valley; Attendance: 17,055; Referee: W Clements

1 September 1962 5	Sunderland	3-1	Swansea Town	Sunderland
	Brian Clough 32', 43'; Stan Anderson 47'; Rooks (yellow card) 50'	7	13' Kenny Morgans; (yellow card) 40' Herbie Williams; (yellow card) 50' Colin Webster; (yellow card) 75' Peter Davies	Stadium: Roker Park; Attendance: 36,982; Referee: RH Windle

5 September 1962 6	Sunderland	2-0	Rotherham United	Sunderland
	Brian Clough 60'; Amby Fogarty 86'	2		Stadium: Roker Park; Attendance: 38,172; Referee: W Crossley

8 September 1962 7	Chelsea	0-1	Sunderland	Fulham
	Frank Upton 40'	4		Stadium: Stamford Bridge; Attendance: 32,901; Referee: NCH Burtenshaw

11 September 1962 8	Sunderland	2-4	Rotherham United	Sunderland
	Amby Fogarty 70', 81'	6	43 'kirkman 75 ', 77 'benett 87 ' houghton	Stadium: Roker Park; Attendance: 38,172; Referee: W Crossley

15 September 1962 9	Sunderland	3-1	Luton Town	Sunderland
	Brian Clough 58', 78'; Amby Fogarty 75'	7	53' Gordon Turner	Stadium: Roker Park; Attendance: 36,399; Referee: P Rhodes

22 September 1962 10	Southampton	4-2	Sunderland	Southampton
	George Kirby 41', 81'	4	31', 52', 65' Brian Clough; 75' George Mulhall	Stadium: The Dell; Attendance: 18,535; Referee: R Aldous

29 September 1962 11	Sunderland	0-0	Scunthorpe United	Sunderland
		6		Stadium: Roker Park; Attendance: 43,230; Referee: LJ Hamer

6 October 1962 12	Sunderland	3-0	Derby County	Sunderland
	Brian Clough 39', 76'; Ray Young 41' (o.g.))	4		Stadium: Roker Park; Attendance: 35,340; Referee: AW Luty

13 October 1962 13	Newcastle United	1-1	Sunderland	Newcastle-upon-Tyne
	Jimmy Kerray 43'	3	31' Brian Clough	Stadium: St James' Park; Attendance: 62,321; Referee: H Webb

20 October 1962 14	Sunderland	5-0	Walsall	Sunderland
	Jimmy Davison 10', 87'; Stan Anderson 44'; Brian Clough 58'; George Mulhall 76'	2	(yellow card) 7' Ken Hodgkisson	Stadium: Roker Park; Attendance: 36,750; Referee: JW Bullough

27 October 1962 15	Norwich City	2-4	Sunderland	Norwich
	Jimmy Hill 22', 47', 87'; Jim Oliver 70'	4	32' Brian Clough; 35'Charlie Hurley	Stadium: Carrow Road; Attendance: 23,439; Referee: A Holland

3 November 1962 16	Sunderland	6-2	Grimsby Town	Sunderland
	Jimmy Davison 9', 11'; Brian Clough 15', 51', 58'; George Herd 70'	3	George McLean 73'; Cliff Portwood 78'	Stadium: Roker Park; Attendance: 43,087; Referee: KR Tuck

10 November 1962 17	Plymouth Argyle	1-1	Sunderland	Plymouth
	Mickey Lill 60'	3	89' Brian Clough	Stadium: Home Park; Attendance: 18,561; Referee: KG Aston

17 November 1962 18	Sunderland	2-1	Preston North End	Sunderland
	Jimmy Davison 37'; Charlie Hurley 69'	3	15' (o.g.) Colin Nelson	Stadium: Roker Park; Attendance: 29,976; Referee: AW Sparling

24 November 1962 19	Portsmouth	1-3	Sunderland	Portsmouth
	Tony Barton 46'; Roy Smith 58'; Harry Harris 72'	5	87' Colin Nelson	Stadium: Fratton Park; Attendance: 15,000; Referee: AE Moore

1 December 1962 20	Sunderland	2-1	Cardiff City	Sunderland
	Jimmy Davison 35'; Brian Clough 52'	4	60' Ivor Allchurch	Stadium: Roker Park; Attendance: 37,603; Referee: GW Grundy

8 December 1962 21	Huddersfield Town	3-0	Sunderland	Huddersfield
		2	46', 49' Brian Clough; 62' George Mulhall	Stadium: Leeds Road; Attendance: 21,260; Referee: A Jobling

15 December 1962 22	Middlesbrough	3-3	Sunderland	Middlesbrough
	Billy Horner 26'; Arthur Kaye 41'; Bryan Orritt 43'	2	20' George Mulhall; 24' Brian Clough; 25' George Herd	Stadium: Ayresome Park; Attendance: 43,509; Referee: F Cowen
Note: Sunderland scored their second and third goals while down to 10 men, McNab receiving treatment for a shoulder injury. He returned after Horner had pulled a goal back but was a virtual passenger and did not appear for the second half.

22 December 1962 23	Sunderland	2-1	Leeds United	Sunderland
	George Mulhall 27'; Charlie Hurley 68'	2	80' Billy Bremner	Stadium: Roker Park; Attendance: 40,252; Referee: KE Walker

26 December 1962 24	Sunderland	0-1	Bury	Sunderland
		2	60' Brian Turner	Stadium: Roker Park; Attendance: 42,407; Referee: K Howley
Note: In the 27th minute, Brian Clough was injured in a collison with the Bury goalkeeper. Torn ligaments kept him out for the rest of the season and ultimately ended his brilliant playing career.

29 December 1962 25	Bury	0-3	Sunderland	Bury
	Jack Threlfall 51'; Bill Calder 53'; Billy Griffin 60'	3		Stadium: Gigg Lane; Attendance: 17,329; Referee: V James

23 February 1963 26	Derby County	2-2	Sunderland	Derby
	Bill Curry 14'; Barry Hutchinson 39'	2	55' Johnny Crossan; 70' Stan Anderson	Stadium: Baseball Ground; Attendance: 15,460; Referee: J Parkinson

2 March 1963 27	Sunderland	0-0	Newcastle United	Sunderland
		2		Stadium: Roker Park; Attendance: 62,420; Referee: K Howley
Note: Hollins saved a penalty from Anderson at 38th

9 March 1963 28	Walsall	2-3	Sunderland	Walsall
	Colin Taylor 25', 32'	2	5', 18', 47' (pen.) Johnny Crossan	Stadium: Fellows Park; Attendance: 7,234; Referee: JE Carr

20 March 1963 29	Sunderland	7-1	Norwich City	Sunderland
	Nick Sharkey 35', 40', 44', 60', 86'; Stan Anderson 57'; Johnny Crossan 64'	2	85' Jimmy Hill	Stadium: Roker Park; Attendance: 42,393; Referee: A Holland

23 March 1963 30	Grimsby Town	2-1	Sunderland	Cleethorpes
	Ronnie Foster 60'	1	20'George Herd; 78' Charlie Hurley	Stadium: Blundell Park; Attendance: 12,332; Referee: AW Luty

30 March 1963 31	Sunderland	1-1	Plymouth Argyle	Sunderland
	Johnny Crossan 38'	1	36' Alan O'Neill	Stadium: Roker Park; Attendance: 31,276; Referee: H Richards

6 April 1963 32	Preston North End	1-1	Sunderland	Preston
	Doug Holden 79'	3	86' Jimmy Davison	Stadium: Deepdale; Attendance: 14,015; Referee: WG Handley

12 April 1963 33	Sunderland	0-0	Stoke City	Sunderland
		3		Stadium: Roker Park; Attendance: 62,138; Referee: AW Sparling

13 April 1963 34	Sunderland	1-0	Portsmouth	Sunderland
	Harry Hooper 35'	3		Stadium: Roker Park; Attendance: 35,356; Referee: RH Windle

15 April 1963 35	Stoke City	2-1	Sunderland	Stoke-on-Trent
	Dennis Viollet 1' (pen.), 90'; Clamp (yellow card) 76'	3	25' Andy Kerr; (yellow card) 25' Cec Irwin; (yellow card) 75' Len Ashurst	Stadium: Victoria Ground; Attendance: 42,394

20 April 1963 36	Cardiff City	2-5	Sunderland	Cardiff
	Derek Tapscott 12'; Peter Hooper 17', 37'; Alan McIntosh 45'; Mel Charles 71'	3	55' (o.g.) Trevor Edwards; 57' Andy Kerr	Stadium: Ninian Park; Attendance: 12,293; Referee: PG Brandwood

27 April 1963 37	Sunderland	1-1	Huddersfield Town	Sunderland
	George Mulhall 46'	3	51' Mike O'Grady	Stadium: Roker Park; Attendance: 37,098; Referee: GW Grundy

30 April 1963 38	Scunthorpe United	1-1	Sunderland	Scunthorpe
	Len Ashurst 50' (o.g.)	3	83' Johnny Crossan	Stadium: Old Show Ground; Attendance: 9,090; Referee: G McCabe

4 May 1963 39	Sunderland	4-0	Southampton	Sunderland
	Johnny Crossan 17', 19', 62'; Jimmy Davison 59'	3	(yellow card) 55' Kirby	Stadium: Roker Park; Attendance: 34,612; Referee: V James

11 May 1963 40	Swansea Town	4-3	Sunderland	Swansea
	Eddie Thomas 13'; Peter Davies 30'; Barrie Jones 56'	2	3' Jimmy Davison; 27', 80' Johnny Crossan; 29'George Herd	Stadium: Vetch Field; Attendance: 8,567; Referee: KH Burns

13 May 1963 41	Luton Town	0-3	Sunderland	Luton
		1	21' 84 'Nick Sharkey; 46 'George Mulhall	Stadium: Kenilworth Road; Attendance: 16,419; Referee: W Clements

18 May 1963 42	Sunderland	0-1	Chelsea	Sunderland
	Crossan (yellow card) 24'	2	27'Tommy Harmer; (yellow card) 40' McCreadie; (yellow card) 43' Upton	Stadium: Roker Park; Attendance: 47,918; Referee: LJ Tirebuck

=== League Cup ===
24 September 1962 2	Sunderland	7-1	Oldham Athletic	Sunderland
	Brian Clough; George Mulhall; Amby Fogarty, Joe Kiernan		Bert Lister	Stadium: Roker Park; Attendance: 15,742; Referee: R Harper

17 October 1962 3	Sunderland	2-0	Scunthorpe United	Sunderland
	Dickie Rooks; George Mulhall			Stadium: Roker Park; Attendance: 18,154; Referee: W Crossley

14 November 1962 4	Portsmouth	0-0	Sunderland	Portsmouth
				Stadium: Fratton Park; Attendance: 13,511; Referee: J Finney

21 November 1962 replay	Sunderland	2-1	Portsmouth	Sunderland
	Jimmy McNab; George Herd		(og)' Colin Nelson	Stadium: Roker Park; Attendance: 14,484; Referee: LJ Hamer

5 December 1962 5	Sunderland	3-2	Blackburn Rovers	Sunderland
	Brian Clough 11', 83'; Jimmy McNab 22'		5' Ian Lawther; 84' (o.g.) Len Ashurst	Stadium: Roker Park; Attendance: 24,727; Referee: P Rhodes

==== Semifinals ====
12 January 1963 1	Sunderland	1-3	Aston Villa	Sunderland
	Nick Sharkey 61'		26'Vic Crowe; 44'Bobby Thomson; 88'Derek Dougan	Stadium: Roker Park; Attendance: 33,237; Referee: A Jobling

22 April 1963 2	Aston Villa	0-0 (3-1 agg.)	Sunderland	Birmingham
				Stadium: Villa Park; Attendance: 22,102; Referee: RE Smith

=== FA Cup ===
5 January 1963 3	Preston North End	1-4	Sunderland	Preston
	Doug Holden 4'		59'Amby Fogarty; 89' Jimmy Davison; 44', 63'Nick Sharkey	Stadium: Deepdale; Attendance: 25,917; Referee: A Holland

12 February 1963 4	Gravesend & Northfleet	1-1	Sunderland	Northfleet
	Skingley		George Mulhall	Stadium: Stonebridge Road; Attendance: 12,032; Referee: LW Faulkner

18 February 1963 replay	Sunderland	5-2	Gravesend & Northfleet	Sunderland
	Johnny Crossan (2)'; George Mulhall; Amby Fogarty; Nick Sharkey		McNichol; Tony Sitford	Stadium: Roker Park; Attendance: 29,659; Referee: LW Faulkner

25 March 1963 5	Coventry City	2-1	Sunderland	Coventry
	Dietmar Bruck 82'; George Curtis 85'		33' Johnny Crossan	Stadium: Highfield Road; Attendance: 40,401; Referee: G McCabe
Note: Several gates were broken down and it is estimated that 4-5,000 fans entered the ground without being recorded.

== Statistics ==
=== Squad statistics ===
No.	Pos	Nat	Player	Total		Football League Division Two		FA Cup		Football League Cup	
No.	Pos	Nat	Player	Apps	Goals	Apps	Goals	Apps	Goals	Apps	Goals
	GK	(England) ENG	Jimmy Montgomery	53	0	42	0	4	0	7	0
	DF	(England) ENG	Colin Nelson	36	1	26	1	4	0	6	0
	DF	(Scotland) SCO	Jimmy McNab	48	3	39	1	4	0	5	2
	DF	(Republic of Ireland) IRL	Charlie Hurley	48	5	38	5	4	0	6	0
	DF	(England) ENG	Len Ashurst	51	0	40	0	4	0	7	0
	MF	(England) ENG	George Herd	47	5	40	4	3	0	4	1
	MF	(England) ENG	Stan Anderson	42	4	35	4	2	0	5	0
	FW	(England) ENG	Jimmy Davison	41	10	33	9	2	1	6	0
	FW	(Republic of Ireland) IRL	Amby Fogarty	29	8	20	4	3	2	6	2
	FW	(Northern Ireland) NIR	Johnny Crossan	32	15	24	12	4	3	4	0
	FW	(Scotland) SCO	George Mulhall	45	11	35	7	4	2	6	2
	GK	(England) ENG	Keith Hird	0	0	0	0	0	0	0	0
	FW	(England) ENG	Brian Clough	28	28	24	24	0	0	4	4
	DF	(England) ENG	Cec Irwin	19	0	18	0	0	0	1	0
	FW	(Scotland) SCO	Nick Sharkey	17	11	10	7	4	3	3	1
	DF	(Northern Ireland) NIR	Martin Harvey	14	0	9	0	2	0	3	0
	FW	(Scotland) SCO	Andy Kerr	8	2	8	2	0	0	0	0
	FW	(England) ENG	Harry Hooper	7	1	6	1	0	0	1	0
	DF	(England) ENG	Dickie Rooks	5	1	4	0	0	0	1	1
	FW	(Northern Ireland) NIR	Norman Clarke	5	0	4	0	0	0	1	0
	FW	(Scotland) SCO	Willie McPheat	3	1	3	1	0	0	0	0
	MF	(England) ENG	Tommy Mitchinson	2	0	2	0	0	0	0	0
	DF	(Scotland) SCO	Joe Kiernan	2	2	1	0	0	0	1	2
	FW	(England) ENG	Jack Overfield	1	0	1	0	0	0	0	0
	DF	(England) ENG	Jimmy Nelson	0	0	0	0	0	0	0	0

- Source: https://www.11v11.com/teams/sunderland/tab/players/season/1963/
