= Len Ashurst =

English footballer and manager (1939–2021)

Personal information
- Date of birth: 10 March 1939
- Place of birth: Fazakerley, Liverpool, England
- Date of death: 25 September 2021 (aged 82)
- Height: 5 ft 9 in (1.75 m)
- Position: Defender

Youth career
- 1954–1957: Liverpool
- 1957: Wolverhampton Wanderers
- 1957: Prescot Cables

Senior career*
Years	Team	Apps	(Gls)
1957–1970	Sunderland	409	(4)
1970–1973	Hartlepool United	46	(2)
Total		455	(6)

International career
1956–1957	England Youth	7	(0)
1961	England U23	1	(0)

Managerial career
- 1971–1974: Hartlepool United
- 1974–1975: Gillingham
- 1975–1977: Sheffield Wednesday
- 1978–1982: Newport County
- 1982–1984: Cardiff City
- 1984–1985: Sunderland
- 1988–1989: Al-Wakrah
- 1989–1991: Cardiff City
- 1991–1992: Pahang
- 1992–1993: Weymouth
- * Club domestic league appearances and goals

Leonard Ashurst (10 March 1939 – 25 September 2021) was an English football player, manager and administrator.

He spent most of his playing career with Sunderland, making 458 appearances, the second most in the club's history. He retired at Hartlepool United, where he began managing. Ashurst also managed Sunderland, won the Welsh Cup with Newport County in 1980, and had two spells at Cardiff City.

Ashurst was inducted into the League Managers Association Hall of Fame in 2014. After his managerial career, he was an administrator at The Football Association and a match delegate for the Premier League.

== Playing career ==
=== Early career ===
Leonard was born on 10 March 1939 in Fazakerley, Liverpool, to Elsie and Joseph Ashurst. Initially a centre-half, he was moved to left-back by Liverpool Schoolboys as the team were short on naturally left-footed players, and helped the side to win the English Schools Trophy with an 8–1 aggregate win over Southampton Schoolboys. He was signed to the ground staff at Liverpool in 1954. He also worked as an apprentice compositor in the printing trade. He won seven caps for the England youth team in the 1956–57 season. Despite this international recognition he was not offered a professional contract by Liverpool manager Phil Taylor, and instead joined Wolverhampton Wanderers on amateur terms. Whilst playing third team football for Wolves, Ashurst was approached by Sunderland coach George Curtis, who promised him a professional contract at the club. In order to gain release from Wolves, Ashurst told manager Stan Cullis he wanted to leave professional football to continue his printing apprenticeship and to play for local Lancashire Combination team Prescot Cables; Cullis agreed, and Ashurst subsequently moved from Prescot Cables to Sunderland.

=== Sunderland ===
Ashurst signed professional forms at Sunderland on 27 December 1957, and made his debut for the reserve team the following day. Manager Alan Brown handed him his first team debut on 20 September 1958, in a 2–0 defeat to Ipswich Town at Roker Park; Jim McNab and Cecil Irwin also made their senior debuts in the match. Brown was in the process of dismantling the team that had been relegated the previous season, and Ashurst went on to feature in a total of 33 Second Division matches across the 1958–59 campaign. He was called up to the England under-23 team on 15 March 1961, in a 4–1 victory over Germany at White Hart Lane.

Following the abolition of the maximum wage in January 1961, Ashurst signed a new contract at £40-per-week the following summer. He went on to make 458 appearances for the club; putting him second in the all time appearances list in Sunderland's history, and one of only two outfield players to top 400 appearances. He scored four Sunderland goals during his time at the club. In the late sixties, alongside Jimmy Montgomery, Cecil Irwin, Martin Harvey, Charlie Hurley and Jim McNab, Ashurst formed one of the most notable and most settled back fives in Sunderland's history.

=== Hartlepool United ===
After receiving a testimonial match against Newcastle United, Ashurst was given a free-transfer to Hartlepool United where he became a player-manager. He ended his playing career in the 1972–73 season while at Hartlepool, and subsequently remained manager until May 1974 when he was appointed manager of Gillingham.

== Managerial career ==
Ashurst managed Gillingham, Sheffield Wednesday, Newport County and Cardiff City before returning to Sunderland as manager in March 1984.

Ashurst was appointed manager of Newport County in 1978 following the departure of Colin Addison to West Bromwich Albion. Ashurst was manager from 1978 to 1982, the most successful period in the club's history. Newport were promoted to the Third Division in the 1979–80 season and won the Welsh Cup, entitling them to play in the 1980–81 season European Cup Winners' Cup, reaching the quarter-finals. Ashurst was sacked by Newport County in February 1982 and Addison returned as team manager. The team, largely assembled by Ashurst, attained Newport County's highest post-war finish in the 1982–83 season, 4th in the Third Division, narrowly missing out on promotion.

His time as Sunderland manager was not successful, despite his taking them to their first ever League Cup final. Performance in the league was poor and Sunderland were relegated from the first division. Ashurst was sacked in May 1985.

After the Sunderland job, Ashurst went on to become a coach with Kuwait national football team and later the Qatar national football team. He was manager of Qatari club Al-Wakrah and also coached in Malaysia.

After returning to England, he was assistant manager of Blackpool, and then in September 1989 he returned for a second spell as manager of Cardiff City following the departure of Frank Burrows. He spent two years in Ninian Park before resigning in 1991 as the team struggled both on and off the pitch. His last managerial role was a one-year stay at Weymouth.

== Football administration career ==
From the mid-1990s, Ashurst became heavily involved in an administrator's role at the Football Association specifically with regard to the Academy system. In 2002, he became a Premier League match delegate, and was tasked with assessing match officials. He was inducted into the League Managers' Association Hall of Fame in 2014.

== Personal life ==
Ashurst married Valerie in her home village of East Rainton in May 1961.

He died on 25 September 2021, at the age of 82.

== Career statistics ==
Appearances and goals by club, season and competition
Club	Season	League			FA Cup		League Cup		Total	
Club	Season	Division	Apps	Goals	Apps	Goals	Apps	Goals	Apps	Goals
Sunderland	1958–59	Second Division	33	0	1	0	0	0	34	0
Sunderland	1959–60	Second Division	32	0	2	0	0	0	34	0
Sunderland	1960–61	Second Division	40	1	5	0	1	0	46	1
Sunderland	1961–62	Second Division	42	0	4	0	5	0	51	0
Sunderland	1962–63	Second Division	40	0	4	0	7	0	51	0
Sunderland	1963–64	Second Division	42	1	6	0	1	0	49	1
Sunderland	1964–65	First Division	39	2	2	0	3	0	44	2
Sunderland	1965–66	First Division	37	0	1	0	2	0	40	0
Sunderland	1966–67	First Division	28	0	0	0	2	0	30	0
Sunderland	1967–68	First Division	24	0	0	0	1	0	25	0
Sunderland	1968–69	First Division	20	0	0	0	0	0	20	0
Sunderland	1969–70	First Division	32	0	1	0	1	0	34	0
Sunderland	Total		409	4	26	0	23	0	458	4
Hartlepool	1970–71	Fourth Division	13	0	0	0	0	0	13	0
Hartlepool	1971–72	Fourth Division	26	2	2	0	2	0	30	2
Hartlepool	1972–73	Fourth Division	7	0	3	0	0	0	10	0
Hartlepool	Total		46	2	5	0	2	0	53	2
Career total			455	6	31	0	25	0	511	6

== Managerial statistics ==
Managerial record by team and tenure
Team	From	To	Record				
Team	From	To	P	W	D	L	Win %
Hartlepool	1 March 1971	1 June 1974	164	50	41	73	30.5
Gillingham	1 June 1974	15 October 1975	60	21	20	19	35.0
Sheffield Wednesday	15 October 1975	5 October 1977	104	38	28	38	36.5
Newport County	1 June 1978	8 February 1982	194	80	48	66	41.2
Cardiff City	3 March 1982	1 March 1984	102	46	19	37	45.1
Sunderland	4 March 1984	23 May 1985	66	21	16	29	31.8
Cardiff City	31 August 1989	1 May 1991	98	30	32	36	30.6
Total			788	286	204	298	36.3

== Honours ==
=== As a player ===
Sunderland

- Football League Second Division second-place promotion: 1963–64

=== As a manager ===
Newport County

- Football League Fourth Division third-place promotion: 1979–80
- Welsh Cup: 1980

Cardiff City

- Football League Third Division second-place promotion: 1982–83

Sunderland

- Football League Cup runner-up: 1984–85
