= Anticipations =

Book by Herbert George Wells

- First edition (UK)
- Author: H. G. Wells
- Original title: Anticipations of the Reaction of Mechanical and Scientific Progress upon Human Life and Thought
- Language: English
- Publisher: Harper & Brothers (US); Chapman & Hall (UK)
- Publication date: November 1901
- Publication place: United Kingdom
- Pages: 342
- Text: Anticipations at Wikisource

Anticipations of the Reaction of Mechanical and Scientific Progress upon Human Life and Thought, generally known as Anticipations, was written by H.G. Wells at the age of 34. He later called the book, which became a bestseller, "the keystone to the main arch of my work." His most recent biographer, however, calls the volume "both the starting point and the lowest point in Wells's career as a social thinker."

Taking the revolution in transport facilitated by the "mechanical revolution" as his point of departure, Wells told readers they were living through a reorganization of human society that would alter every dimension of life. An academic biographer has described the degree of accuracy of Wells's predictions as "certainly phenomenal."

The chapters of Anticipations appeared in Great Britain in the Fortnightly Review (April–December 1901) and in the United States in the North American Review (June–November 1901), and were published as a book in November 1901. Anticipations was "Wells's first non-fiction bestseller." The volume was reissued by Chapman and Hall in 1914, on the eve of World War I.

== Synopsis ==
=== Chapter 1: Locomotion in the Twentieth Century ===
Proposing to forecast "the way things will probably go in this new century," Wells's point of departure is "the probable developments and changes of the means of land locomotion during the coming decades." Taking the "steam engine running on a railway" to be the most characteristic symbol of the 19th century, he analyzes the historical factors that led it to appear when it did. Wells predicts that "new motor vehicles" will lead to trucks, cars ("motor carriages"), and buses ("the motor omnibus") that will be "segregated" from horse traffic on "special roads" competing with railways.

=== Chapter 2: The Probable Diffusion of Great Cities ===
Wells argues that the speed of land travel stands "in almost fundamental relation to human society." The speeding up of land locomotion will therefore revolutionize human society. Rather than producing even larger cities, a new sort of "human distribution" will be created, with the increase in the distance a worker can travel in an hour acting as a "centrifugal" force leading to a considerable development of "suburbs" while this development is counterbalanced by "centripetal considerations" like a desire for access to shopping districts, good schools, doctors, and "the love of the crowd." The terms "town" and "country" will become obsolete as a new kind of "urban region" develops.

=== Chapter 3: Developing Social Elements ===
The two-class social system of a lower class administered by a superior class derived from the speed of horses in an agricultural society, according to Wells. The revolution in technology, he predicts, will produce in the 20th century a system of four classes: (1) "the shareholding class" administering "irresponsible property"; (2) "the abyss," consisting of people "without either property or any evident function in the social organism"; (3) a reconstructed, productive, and "capable" middle class, including, notably, "mechanics and engineers," whose potential will depend on the education this class receives, no longer being "middle" in any meaningful sense; and (4) a class of non-productive business managers, political organizers, brokers, financiers, clerks, etc. "All these elements will be mingled confusedly together, passing into one another by insensible gradations." Wells regards the United States as "the social mass which has perhaps advanced furthest along the new lines."

=== Chapter 4: Certain Social Reactions ===
Circa 2000, Wells predicts, the capable productive class will have developed a way of life characterized by a scientific worldview, an ethos of social duty, and an unsentimental view of personal relations that lead it to view "a childless, sterile life" as "essentially failure and perversion." Families of this class will live in efficient households with no need for domestic servants. The shareholder class will cultivate opulent, archaic decoration, which Wells clearly deplores, and he also fears that its wealth may enable it not only to "buy up almost all the available architectural talent" but also "in a certain figurative sense—buy up much of the womankind" that would otherwise belong to the capable class.

=== Chapter 5: The Life-History of Democracy ===
Wells argues that "democracy" is a term with little specificity, signifying little more than a denial "that any specific person or persons should act as a matter of intrinsic right or capacity on behalf of the community as a whole." As a political creed, Wells considers democracy flimsy and untenable: "I know of no case for the elective Democratic government of modern states that cannot be knocked to pieces in five minutes." The appearance of representative democracy Wells links to what he called the "mechanical revolution" (hence its early appearance in Great Britain, the U.S., and France), and explains the appearance of a belief in "the people" as little more than a disbelief in monarchs and nobles. In Wells's view, it is not the people but rather "a scientifically trained middle-class of an unprecedented sort" that "will become, I believe, at last consciously the State." The real governors that "democracy" produces—political bosses and demagogues—Wells regards as likely to provoke wars. But they will be incapable of managing these wars, leading to their replacement.

=== Chapter 6: War ===
Wells sees the mechanical revolution as making the division of armies into infantry and cavalry obsolete. The "new war" is determined by the increasing range and accuracy of the rifle (and also of the field gun). Wells predicts that a few snipers will be able to defend territory against a larger force. War will become less "dramatic" and more "monstrous." The State will organize all of society for the support of its war machine. Wells analyzes how tactics will be altered by rapid locomotion, command of the air, and "light, swift ships." (But "my imagination, in spite even of spurring, refuses to see any sort of submarine doing anything but suffocate its crew and founder at sea.") Technical, not moral factors will be determinate. Societies with the most well developed and consolidated "educated efficient classes" will prevail.

=== Chapter 7: The Conflict of Language ===
Wells predicts that "unifying sources" give only English, French (or possibly German), and Chinese a chance of flourishing in the future. Dismissing the racialist thought associated with romantic nationalism as "nonsense," he predicts that languages like Spanish and Russian by the year 2000 will "be tending more and more to be the second tongues of bilingual communities."

=== Chapter 8: The Larger Synthesis ===
Though it may take "centuries of misunderstanding and bloodshed," Wells predicts that the process he is describing "aims finally, and will attain to the establishment of one world-state at peace within itself." Present-day economic integration anticipates this, as do "at least five spacious movements of coalescence": Anglo-Saxonism, British imperialism, Pan-Germanism, Pan-Slavism, and the idea of a union of "Latin" peoples. Wells analyzes each of these. But he believes it is "a naturally and informally organized, educated class" rather than any regional political movement that will be the means whereby "a New Republic" will come to dominate the world. Wells scrutinizes the present for signs of such a development, and finds them in American trusts, unofficial organizations like the Navy League, philanthropic tycoons, etc.

=== Chapter 9: The Faith, Morals, and Public Policy of the New Republic ===
In his concluding chapter, Wells went as far as he ever did in the direction of eugenics, advocating a "euthanasia of the weak and the sensual." In his text, he insists that social groups will not be treated "as races at all" but as individuals. It cannot be denied, however, that Wells declares that he rejects racism and anti-Semitism. A recent biographer has said that "Nothing has done more damage to Wells's reputation than the concluding chapter of Anticipations."

Wells predicts that a stern morality freed from the trammels of exploded religious beliefs and based on ideas of Malthusianism and natural selection will sustain aggressive action of the "World State" to "check" and "control" human activity so as "to favour the procreation of what is fine and efficient and beautiful in humanity." The future rulers will not quail before the need to use the "method" of "death"; about death "they will have no superstitions." "[G]ood scientifically caused pain" may also be used, but its use can be "unsafe and demoralizing" for those who inflict it. So "[t]o kill under the seemly conditions science will afford is a far less offensive thing." Sexual morality, on the other hand, will be comprehensively liberalized, facilitating the goal of having "perhaps half the population of the world, in every generation, restrained from or tempted to evade reproduction." Declaring these to be policies devoted to "a purpose greater than happiness," Wells declares that it is not for immortality, but for the "spacious" "future of our race" [i.e. the human race], that the "kinetic men of the coming time" will "live and die."

== Genesis ==
The idea of writing the articles that became the chapters of Anticipations was suggested to Wells by James B. Pinker, his literary agent. Pinker persuaded Wells that "the thinking literary men" had a responsibility to express their views. It is perhaps also noteworthy that the book was written while Wells awaited the birth of his first child, George Philip ("Gip") Wells, born on July 17, 1901.

In a letter to Elizabeth Healy, Wells said that the purpose of Anticipations was "to undermine and destroy the monarch, monogamy, faith in God & respectability—& the British Empire, all under the guise of a speculation about motor cars & electric heating."

== Reception ==
In the words of a biographer, Anticipations "took England by storm," making Wells "almost famous in fact." Vigorously promoted, the book and its views were widely discussed. "Every significant thinker [in Great Britain] apparently read and thought about the book," according to an academic biographer.

The publication of Anticipations led to Wells's friendship with E. Ray Lancaster, the director of the Museum of Natural History. The book was appreciated by Sidney and Beatrice Webb, who introduced Wells to Graham Wallas. William James predicted that Anticipations would influence British youth, but thought that Wells did not allow sufficiently for "human nature."

Wells's Anticipations, together with his next production, The Discovery of the Future, established him as "a great man," according to one biographer, and as a result he was soon sought out by many leading figures of the day. "Bertie Wells had been transformed into H.G." He became a major literary figure as well as new socialist leader who was courted by the Fabians.

Later readers have recoiled at what Lovat Dickson in 1969 called the book's suggestion of "strong-armed fascism." W. Warren Wagar, discussing Anticipations' advocacy of racism, eugenics and capital punishment, noted "To Wells' credit, he would soon abandon such thoughts, but they were all here in plain English in Anticipations and we have no power or licence to wish them away". A number of writers (e.g. Michael Coren and John Carey ) have made even stronger charges against Wells. But in fact Wells responded to criticism and was soon arguing against the negative eugenics advocated in Chapter 9, and he later became a leading advocate of human rights. Sherborne notes within two years of the publication of Anticipations: "Wells would be arguing against negative eugenics; within three defending black people against race prejudice; within four advocating the desirability of a multitracial society".

== Cultural impact ==
The print magazine of the Young Fabians, the youth wing of the Fabian Society of which H.G.Wells was a member, is named after this.
