= Norman Clarke =

Norman Clarke may refer to:

- Norman Clarke (basketball), Canadian basketball player
- Norman Clarke (bishop), Anglican bishop of Plymouth
- Norman Clarke (footballer) (born 1942), Northern Irish footballer
- Norman Clarke (physicist), British physicist and politician
