= Wakelam =

Wakelam is a surname. Notable people with the surname include:

- Michael Wakelam (1955–2020), British molecular biologist
- Stephen Wakelam, English writer and playwright
- Teddy Wakelam (1893–1963), English broadcaster and rugby player

== See also ==
- Wakeham (surname)
