= Martin Harvey =

Northern Irish footballer (1941–2019)

Personal information
- Date of birth: 19 September 1941
- Place of birth: Belfast, Northern Ireland
- Date of death: 25 November 2019 (aged 78)
- Place of death: Plymouth
- Position: Wing half

Senior career*
| Years | Team | Apps | (Gls) |
| 1959–1972 | Sunderland | 314 | (5) |

International career
| 1961–1971 | Northern Ireland | 34 | (3) |
- * Club domestic league appearances and goals

Martin Harvey (19 September 1941 — 25 November 2019) was a Northern Irish footballer who played for Sunderland and the Northern Ireland national team as a wing half.

== Playing career ==
=== Club ===
He played for local side Boyland F.C. and with a trial spell with Burnley before signing for Sunderland in 1959. His debut for the club came on 24 October 1959 against Plymouth Argyle in a 0–0 draw at Home Park. In total he made 314 league appearances, scoring five goals while at Sunderland.

In the late sixties, alongside Jimmy Montgomery, Cecil Irwin, Len Ashurst, Charlie Hurley and Jim McNab, Harvey formed one of the most notable and most settled back fives in Sunderland's history. In September 1967 Tommy Cummings' Aston Villa agreed to buy Harvey for £25,000.00. Harvey chose to remain at Sunderland.

During the 1971–1972 season, Harvey sustained serious back and other injuries which forced his premature retirement at the age of 30.

=== International ===
Harvey was capped twice for Northern Ireland 'B', and played three matches, all against Wales, for the Under 23 side in 1962, 1963 and 1964. By then, he was already a full international. His first cap was awarded when he was just nineteen years old, in April 1961. Over the next ten years, he was to collect a total of 34 caps, scoring three goals.

Harvey won his first international cap for Northern Ireland on 25 April 1961 against Italy in a 3–2 defeat. His international career spanned from 1961 until 1971 where he made 34 caps, scoring 3 goals.

== Coaching career ==
Harvey stayed on at Sunderland after his playing retirement, joining the coaching staff, and appeared in his testimonial match against Newcastle United in April 1975. He then took a similar job at Carlisle United under manager Bobby Moncur. When Moncur left the club in February 1980, Harvey was appointed as caretaker manager, and despite it being widely known that the club's board wished to reappoint former manager Bob Stokoe, a strong run of form under Harvey saw the side climb from being just outside the relegation zone to a final finishing position of sixth place, earning him the manager's job on a permanent basis. However, Harvey was sacked just five games into the following season after a series of thumping defeats, and Stokoe appointed his successor within a matter of hours.

When Moncur was appointed manager of Plymouth Argyle in 1981, he brought Martin Harvey with him as assistant manager. The following year, Harvey was assistant to Northern Ireland manager Billy Bingham at the World Cup finals. Then, when Moncur left Argyle in September 1983, Harvey found himself temporarily in charge. He did well, guiding the team to a 1–1 home draw with Arsenal in the League Cup, and, although Argyle lost both their League fixtures under him, he was considered a strong candidate for the permanent position. However, the board decided not to take the risk, and went instead for the experienced Johnny Hore.

Harvey stayed on as assistant manager until, in October 1984, Hore was dismissed and he found himself in the driving seat again. This time, his stewardship was to last for some six weeks, during which Argyle won two and drew one of their six League fixtures, as well as winning their FA Cup first round tie against Barnet. At the beginning of December, Dave Smith was appointed Argyle manager.

In 1985–86, Martin Harvey left Argyle briefly to work with Billy Bingham in Saudi Arabia and, for the second time, as assistant manager at the World Cup finals. He returned to Home Park, however, and continued to work for the club as a coach until 1990.

Harvey was appointed assistant manager of Raith Rovers in 1990 by new manager (and former Northern Ireland, Manchester United, Sunderland and Rangers fullback) Jimmy Nicholl. In their time in charge together at Stark's Park the club experienced unprecedented success, winning the old Scottish First Division (now referred to as the SPFL Championship) twice in 1992–93 and again in 1994–95, gaining promotion to the Scottish Premier Division. Raith also won a major trophy for the first time in their history, a League Cup Final win on penalties over Celtic at Ibrox on 27 November 1994.

Nicholl and Harvey left Raith Rovers in February 1996 to take over at Millwall, a position they held until leaving the South London club in February 1997. Martin is believed to have then settled in Devon.

== Death ==
Harvey died on Monday 25 November 2019, at the age of 78.
