= Jim McNab =

Scottish footballer (1940–2006)

Personal information
- Full name: James McNab
- Date of birth: 13 April 1940
- Place of birth: Denny, Scotland
- Date of death: 29 June 2006 (aged 66)
- Position: Left half

Youth career
- 1957–1958: Sunderland

Senior career*
| Years | Team | Apps | (Gls) |
| 1958–1967 | Sunderland | 285 | (13) |
| 1967–1974 | Preston North End | 224 | (6) |
| 1974–1976 | Stockport County | 30 | (1) |
| Total | | 539 | (20) |
- * Club domestic league appearances and goals

James McNab (13 April 1940 – 29 June 2006) was a Scottish footballer who played as a left half for Sunderland, Preston North End and Stockport County.

He began his career at Sunderland, making 323 appearances and scoring 18 goals in the three major domestic competitions between 1958 and 1967. He was part of the club's Second Division promotion winning side in 1963–64. Alongside Jimmy Montgomery, Cecil Irwin, Len Ashurst, Martin Harvey and Charlie Hurley, McNab formed one of the most notable and most settled back fives in Sunderland's history.

He joined Preston North End in March 1967, making 224 League appearances and scoring 6 goals for the Deepdale club, and twice bring named the Official Player of the Year. He won a Third Division championship medal in 1970–71.

Finally, he moved to Stockport County in 1974 where he ended his career after making a further 30 League appearances, scoring one goal.
