= Jimmy Lawton =

English footballer

Personal information
- Full name: James Michael Lawton
- Date of birth: 6 July 1942 (age 84)
- Place of birth: Middlesbrough, England
- Position: Centre forward

Youth career
- –: Middlesbrough

Senior career*
Years	Team	Apps	(Gls)
1961–1966	Darlington	120	(60)
1965–1967	Swindon Town	11	(3)
1967–1968	Watford	13	(1)
1968–1969	Darlington	22	(3)
Total		166	(67)
- * Club domestic league appearances and goals

James Michael Lawton (born 6 July 1942) is an English-born former footballer who played as a centre forward in the Football League in the 1960s.

Lawton was born in Middlesbrough, and after playing for his home-town club as an amateur he moved to Darlington in the 1961–62 season. Following 120 league appearances and 60 goals for Darlington, he scored in his last game for the club, a 2–1 defeat of Swindon Town in the League Cup on 22 September 1965; shortly afterwards he was transferred to Swindon in exchange for Alan Sproates and £8,000. However, he only managed 11 league appearances at Swindon in an 18-month stay, and after a short stay at Watford, where he played 13 league games, he returned to Darlington in the 1967–68 season. In his second spell he made 22 league appearances and scored 3 goals before retiring through injury.
