= The Discovery of the Future =

1902 philosophical lecture by H. G. Wells

- Author: H. G. Wells
- Original title: The Discovery of the Future: A Discourse Delivered to the Royal Institution on January 24, 1902
- Language: English
- Subject: Future
- Genre: Philosophical literature
- Publisher: T. Fisher Unwin
- Publication date: 1902
- Publication place: United Kingdom
- Pages: 95
- Preceded by: Anticipations
- Followed by: The Sea Lady

The Discovery of the Future is a 1902 philosophical lecture by H. G. Wells that argues for the knowability of the future. It was originally delivered to the Royal Institution on January 24, 1902. Before appearing in book form, it was published by Richard Gregory in Nature on February 6, 1902, and was also published as part of the Annual Report of the Smithsonian Institution. Available online.

== Synopsis ==
Wells begins by distinguishing between "two divergent types of mind," one that judges and attaches importance principally to what has happened in the past and one that judges and attaches importance principally to what will happen in the future. To the former he attributes the adjectives "legal or submissive," "passive," and "oriental," and to the latter the adjectives "legislative, creative, organizing, or masterful," and "active," calling it "a more modern and much less abundant type of mind."

Observing that these two minds reach "divergent and incompatible consequences" in the spheres of morality and public affairs, Wells analyzes the reasons for which the past-oriented mind predominates and asserts that this is principally due to the evidently greater knowability of the personal past as compared to the future. But he argues that the inference from this attitude that the future is essentially unknowable does not square with "modern science, that is to say the relentless systematic criticism of phenomena." Not only has science made us knowledgeable about a distant, impersonal past, it also regards the ability successfully to predict to be a criterion of validity. Though the unpredictability of human behavior complicates the problem, the fact that "as individuals increase in number they begin to average out" means that "an inductive knowledge of a great number of things in the future is becoming a human possibility." Confessing himself to be among "those who believe entirely in the forces behind the individual" rather than in individuals themselves as determining causes, Wells argues that there is "no reason why we should not aspire to, and discover and use, safe and servicable, generalizations upon countless issues in the human destiny." But personal prophecy and fortune-telling will never be possible; "the knowledge of the future we may hope to gain will be general and not individual."

Wells devotes the last part of his text to speculations about "the question what is to come after man," considering it "the most persistently fascinating and the most insoluble question in the whole world." He concludes with a statement of personal faith "in the coherency and purpose in the world and in the greatness of human destiny."

== Background ==
Wells's lecture followed on the heels of the great success of his recent book, Anticipations (1901), based on a series of articles commissioned in 1900 by W.L. Courtney for the Fortnightly Review, but the original invitation to lecture to the Royal Institution had come in 1899.

According to Graham Wallas, Wells's delivery of his lecture was too rapid, but it was well received and contributed to the rapid integration of the 35-year-old Wells into the literary and intellectual elite of London in 1902.
