= Wakeham (surname) =

Wakeham is an English surname. Notable people with the surname include:

- Bill Wakeham (born 1944), British chemical engineer
- Brandon Wakeham (born 1999), Fijian international rugby league footballer
- Janeiro Wakeham (born 2003), Fijian professional rugby union footballer
- John Wakeham (born 1932), British businessman and politician
- Peter Wakeham (1936–2013), English footballer
- Tony Wakeham (born 1956), Canadian politician from Newfoundland and Labrador
