= Charlie Hurley =

Irish footballer (1936–2024)

Personal information
- Full name: Charles John Hurley
- Date of birth: 4 October 1936
- Place of birth: Cork, County Cork, Ireland
- Date of death: 22 April 2024 (aged 87)
- Place of death: Ireland
- Position: Centre half

Senior career*
Years	Team	Apps	(Gls)
1953–1957	Millwall	105	(2)
1957–1969	Sunderland	402	(23)
1969–1971	Bolton Wanderers	43	(3)
Total		550	(28)

International career
1957–1969	Republic of Ireland	40	(2)

Managerial career
- 1972–1977: Reading
- * Club domestic league appearances and goals

Charles John Hurley (4 October 1936 – 22 April 2024) was an Irish footballer who mainly played in the centre half position. Nicknamed 'King', Hurley was a defender for both Sunderland, where he was named as "Player of the Century" by his fans in 1979, and the Republic of Ireland. He ended his playing career at Bolton Wanderers and was later manager of Reading.

== Early life ==
Hurley was born in Cork, Ireland, and his family moved to in Essex, England, when Charlie was seven months old. He later survived The Blitz, in which one of his best friends was killed, and as a teenager worked as an apprentice toolmaker. His first offer of a football contract was from West Ham but he turned it down as he could earn more for his family by continuing with his apprenticeship. However, at the age of sixteen he did eventually accept a contract offer from Millwall.

== Playing career ==
=== Millwall ===
Hurley began his football career at Millwall in 1953, making his debut at the age of seventeen in a 2–2 draw away to Torquay United on 30 January 1954. He went on to make 16 league appearances in the season. He followed this up with 38 league games in 1954–55 and also played three FA Cup ties. At the start of 1955–56, he represented London in the first English team to play in a European competition. London beat Eintracht Frankfurt 3–2 at Wembley in the Fairs Cup. He was thus selected to play for the Republic of Ireland at aged 20, but a cruciate knee ligament injury, whilst representing the army side on his national service, ended any such plans. He recovered, but for the rest of his career he had to be particularly careful when making a sliding tackle and required constant treatment on his left knee.

On 19 May 1957, Hurley made his Irish debut against England in Dublin.

In early October he was sold to Sunderland for a fee of £18,000. He was voted him the 'best ever player' in the Millwall fanzine The Lion Roars prior to the Dockers Day at the New Den in 2007.

=== Sunderland ===
On 26 September 1957, Hurley arrived at Roker Park to begin a career that would span 12 seasons and 402 appearances.

Hurley's Sunderland career had a disastrous start; a 7–0 rout by Blackpool, coupled with him scoring an own goal on his debut, which was quickly followed by a 6–0 defeat by Burnley. Hurley had been unfortunate enough to have competed against centre forwards who would later go on to represent England. Eventually promotion was achieved in the 1963–64 season after two campaigns which had seen Sunderland miss out on top flight football due to consecutive last day failures against Swansea Town and Chelsea.

It took 124 league and cup appearances for Sunderland before he broke his scoring duck. A 1–1 Boxing Day draw in 1960 against Sheffield United was the first of 43.

Whilst the 1963–64 season was special for Sunderland, resulting in promotion, it was also personally highly satisfactory for Hurley, who came second to Bobby Moore in voting for FWA Footballer of the Year.

In the late sixties, alongside Jimmy Montgomery, Cecil Irwin, Len Ashurst, Martin Harvey and Jim McNab, Hurley formed one of the most notable and most settled back fives in Sunderland's history.

Alan Brown's departure from Roker Park, to take over at Sheffield Wednesday saw first George Hardwick and then Scotsman Ian McColl take over. During one match at Old Trafford in November 1966, first Hurley, and then Northern Ireland defender John Parke went in goal, as Montgomery had to leave the game because of an injury sustained in the first half.

Hurley's last goal for Sunderland came against Arsenal in April 1968, typically a header. His last appearance in a red and white shirt was at Turf Moor, Burnley in April 1969.

In the FA Cup 5th round victory at Carrow Road in February 1961, he scored the only goal to dump Norwich City out of the competition. Sunderland would then go on to succumb to a Danny Blanchflower-inspired Tottenham Hotspur side, who became double winners for the first time in the 20th century.

In a poll on the occasion of the club's centenary in 1979, Sunderland fans voted him their player of the century.

=== Bolton Wanderers ===
On 2 June 1969, Hurley moved to Bolton Wanderers on a free transfer. He spent three years at Burnden Park and was a well-liked figure in the heart of the defence, so much so that he was given the opportunity to manage the club upon the departure of Jimmy Meadows only to reluctantly turn the chance down because his wife missed living in the South of England.

== International career ==
He played 40 times for the Republic of Ireland and was their most-capped player at the time of his final appearance in 1969.

== Managerial career ==
From 1972 to 1977 Hurley managed Reading, then based at Elm Park. In the 4th round of the FA Cup in February 1972 he guided Reading, then a 4th division club, to a 4th-round meeting with Arsenal. Over 20,000 people packed into Elm Park, and Hurley's charges narrowly lost 2–1 to a side containing George Graham, Charlie George, Geordie Armstrong, Bob Wilson, Frank McLintock and other international-class players. Reading finished the season in sixteenth place in Division 4. During the 1972–73 season Hurley enjoyed an emotional 'home coming' when took his side to face Sunderland at Roker Park in the fourth round of the FA Cup. After a 1–1 draw, Sunderland won the replay 3–1. The following spring the Reading manager took a gamble by purchasing Robin Friday from non-league Hayes In 1975–76 Reading won promotion. Hurley quit on 26 February 1977. This was an historic moment as it was the first time a Football League manager had resigned at half time.
