= George Herd =

Scottish footballer and manager (1936–2024)

Personal information
- Full name: George Herd
- Date of birth: 6 May 1936
- Place of birth: Lanark, Scotland
- Date of death: 5 August 2024 (aged 88)
- Position: Inside forward

Senior career*
Years	Team	Apps	(Gls)
195?–1956	Inverness Thistle		
1956–1957	Queen's Park	25	(6)
1957–1961	Clyde	111	(20)
1961–1970	Sunderland	278	(47)
1967	→ Vancouver Royal Canadians (loan)	6	(3)
1970–1971	Hartlepool United	15	(0)

International career
1957	Scotland Amateurs	1	(0)
1957–1958	Scotland U23	2	(1)
1958–1960	Scotland	5	(1)
1960	SFL trial v SFA	1	(0)
1960	Scottish League XI	3	(3)

Managerial career
- 1980–1981: Queen of the South
- * Club domestic league appearances and goals

George Herd (6 May 1936 – 5 August 2024) was a Scottish footballer who played as an inside forward for Inverness Thistle, Queen's Park, Clyde, Sunderland, Vancouver Royal Canadians, Hartlepool United and Scotland.

== Playing career ==
Herd began his football career in the Highland League with Inverness Thistle whilst undertaking his National Service at Fort George Barracks, just outside Inverness. Herd transferred from Inverness Thistle to Scottish Football League amateur club Queen's Park in 1956. He turned professional in May 1957 after moving to Clyde. In his first season at Clyde, he won the 1957–58 Scottish Cup and won his first Scotland cap, a 4–0 defeat to England in April 1958. He was one of five Clyde players named in preliminary World Cup squad for 1958, but he didn't make the cut. He won a further four Scotland caps during his time at Clyde before departing for Sunderland in 1961 where he also took up a coaching role in 1969.

He later had a spell at Hartlepool United in 1970–71 before retiring from playing to become their trainer-coach.

== Coaching and manager career ==
After his playing career, he had coaching spells at Newcastle United and Sunderland.

Herd was appointed manager of Dumfries club Queen of the South in May 1980 where he worked with players such Allan Ball, Iain McChesney, George Cloy, Nobby Clark and Jimmy Robertson. He left this position midway through the following season from which the club went on a promotion winning run.

Herd joined Darlington in a coaching capacity.

At Northern League outfit Seaham Red Star in 2005, Herd began working with Neil Hixon and Stuart Gooden on the coaching staff. With Hixon as manager, Herd acted as head coach. They earned promotion to Division One of the Northern League, as Division Two runners up in 2006–07

Along with Nixon, Herd moved to Sunderland RCA the following season. They again got promotion from Northern League Division Two in their second season (2009–10).

== Death ==
Herd died on 5 August 2024, at the age of 88.

== Honours ==
Inverness Thistle

- Inverness Cup: 1953–54

Clyde

- Scottish Cup: 1957–58
- Glasgow Cup: 1958–59
- Glasgow Charity Cup: 1957–58; runner-up 1958–59

Sunderland

- Football League Second Division: Promotion 1963–64

Individual

- Clyde FC Hall of Fame: Inducted, 2011
