= Dave Bumpstead =

English footballer

Personal information
- Date of birth: 6 November 1935
- Place of birth: Rainham, England
- Date of death: 26 August 2017 (aged 81)
- Place of death: Essex, England
- Height: 6 ft 1 in (1.85 m)
- Position: Right half

Senior career*
Years	Team	Apps	(Gls)
- Tooting & Mitcham United
1957–1962	Millwall	84	(8)
1962–1964	Bristol Rovers	40	(0)

Managerial career
- Wingate
- Brentwood Town
- 1970–1974: Chelmsford City
- * Club domestic league appearances and goals

David Bumpstead (6 November 1935 – 26 August 2017) was an English footballer who played as a defender in the Football League, notably for Bristol Rovers.

== Managerial career ==
Following his retirement, Bumpstead was appointed manager of Athenian League club Wingate. Bumpstead later joined Brentwood Town, managing the club to promotion to the Southern League Premier Division. In 1970, following Brentwood's merger with Chelmsford City, Bumpstead was named manager of Chelmsford. Bumpstead lasted in the role for four years, before ending his association with the club after two months in a general manager role, following the appointment of Syd Prosser as manager.
