= Keith Hird =

English footballer

Personal information
- Full name: Robert Keith Bryan Hird
- Date of birth: 25 November 1939
- Place of birth: Annfield Plain, England
- Date of death: September 1967 (aged 27) (Note: Hird's death was registered in the third quarter of 1992, in the Newcastle upon Tyne registration district.)
- Place of death: Newcastle upon Tyne, England
- Position: Goalkeeper

Senior career*
Years	Team	Apps	(Gls)
–	Annfield Plain		
1957–1963	Sunderland	1	(0)
1963–1964	Darlington	17	(0)
–	Annfield Plain		
- * Club domestic league appearances and goals

Robert Keith Bryan Hird (25 November 1939 – September 1967), known as Keith Hird, was an English footballer who played in the Football League as a goalkeeper for Sunderland and Darlington. He also played non-league football for Annfield Plain.

Hird was born in Annfield Plain, County Durham, and played for his hometown club before joining Sunderland in 1957. His only first-team appearance was in the last match of the 1960–61 Football League season – replacing the previously ever-present Peter Wakeham – in a 1–1 draw HOME to Liverpool in the Second Division. He left the club in 1963, played 17 Fourth Division matches in his only season with Darlington, and returned to Annfield Plain. In September 1967, Hird went missing; he was found drowned in the River Tyne on 6 September. His death was ruled a suicide.
