= Jimmy Davison =

English footballer

Personal information
- Full name: James Hawkins Davison
- Date of birth: 1 November 1942
- Place of birth: Sunderland, England
- Date of death: 1987 (aged 44–45)
- Position: Winger

Senior career*
Years	Team	Apps	(Gls)
1959–1963	Sunderland	62	(10)
1963–1964	Bolton Wanderers	21	(1)
1964–196?	Queen of the South		
- * Club domestic league appearances and goals

James Hawkins Davison (1 November 1942 – 1987) was an English professional footballer who played as a winger for Sunderland from 1959 to 1963.
