= Alan Sproates =

English footballer

Personal information
- Date of birth: 30 June 1944
- Place of birth: Hetton-le-Hole, England
- Date of death: 5 February 2015 (aged 70)
- Place of death: California, United States
- Height: 5 ft 10 in (1.78 m)
- Position: Midfielder

Youth career
- 19??–1961: Sunderland

Senior career*
Years	Team	Apps	(Gls)
1961–1963	Sunderland	0	(0)
1963–1965	Swindon Town	3	(0)
1965–1974	Darlington	315	(17)
1973	→ Miami Toros (loan)	9	(0)
1974–1975	Scunthorpe United	24	(0)
1975	USC Lion (Adelaide)		
1978	Los Angeles Skyhawks		
1980–1981	San Francisco Fog		
- * Club domestic league appearances and goals

Alan Sproates (30 June 1944 – 5 February 2015) was an English professional footballer who played as a midfielder. He made nearly 350 appearances in the Football League, including more than 300 for Darlington, and also played in Australia and the United States.

== Career ==
Sproates was born in 1944 in Hetton-le-Hole, which was then in County Durham. He began his football career with Sunderland, where he turned professional in 1961, but made no first-team appearances before he joined Swindon Town in 1963. After two seasons in which he played only five first-team games, Sproates moved to Darlington in part-exchange for Jimmy Lawton. He remained at the club until 1974, making 315 league appearances and helping the club reach the runners-up spot in the Fourth Division and promotion to the Third Division in the 1965–66 season. He spent the summer of 1973 playing in the North American Soccer League for Miami Toros.

After a year with Scunthorpe United, Sproates was signed by Ukrainian Sports Club Lion in Adelaide playing in the South Australian First Division. He was so impressive that he was voted the Best and Fairest player in the league winning the John Martin Medal. Soon after he moved to the United States, where he coached football and played in the American Soccer League for Los Angeles Skyhawks and for the San Francisco Fog during the 1980–81 Major Indoor Soccer League season.

Sproates and his wife, Bonnie, lived in San Rafael and San Anselmo, in Marin County, California. He died in California in 2015 at the age of 70.

== Honours ==
Darlington

- Fourth Division runners-up: 1965–66
