= Norman Clarke (footballer) =

Northern Irish footballer

Personal information
- Full name: Norman Samson Clarke
- Date of birth: 1 April 1942 (age 84)
- Place of birth: Ballymena, Northern Ireland
- Position: Outside left

Senior career*
Years	Team	Apps	(Gls)
1958–1962	Ballymena United		
1962–1966	Sunderland	4	(0)
1966–1969	Ballymena United		

International career
1959–1961	Northern Ireland Amateurs	6	(0)
1960–1961	Irish League XI	2	
1962–1963	Northern Ireland U23	2	

Managerial career
- 1966–1967: Ballymena United (caretaker)
- * Club domestic league appearances and goals

Norman Samson Clarke (born 1 April 1942) is a Northern Irish retired footballer, best remembered for his two spells as an outside left in the Irish League with Ballymena United. He also served the club as caretaker manager during the 1966–67 season. Clarke's Ballymena United spells were bisected by four years with Football League club Sunderland, where an anterior cruciate ligament injury ended his full-time career.

== Personal life ==
Following the end of his second spell with Ballymena United, Clarke returned to Sunderland and worked for an electronics firm. He later moved to London and scouted for Liverpool.

== Career statistics ==
Appearances and goals by club, season and competition
Club	Season	League			FA Cup		League Cup		Total	
Club	Season	Division	Apps	Goals	Apps	Goals	Apps	Goals	Apps	Goals
Sunderland	1962–63	Second Division	4	0	0	0	1	0	5	0
Career total			4	0	0	0	1	0	5	0
