= Willie McPheat =

Scottish footballer (1942–2019)

Personal information
- Full name: William McPheat
- Date of birth: 4 September 1942
- Place of birth: Caldercruix, Scotland
- Date of death: 7 April 2019 (aged 76)
- Height: 6 ft 0 in (1.83 m)
- Position: Inside forward

Youth career
- 1958–1959: Calder Juniors

Senior career*
Years	Team	Apps	(Gls)
1960–1963	Sunderland	58	(19)
1965–1966	Hartlepools United	15	(2)
1966–1971	Airdrieonians	100	(19)
- * Club domestic league appearances and goals

William McPheat (4 September 1942 – 7 April 2019) was a Scottish professional footballer who played as an inside forward for Sunderland.
