= John Dillon (footballer, born 1942) =

Scottish footballer (1942–2019)

Personal information
- Date of birth: 9 November 1942
- Place of birth: Coatbridge, Scotland
- Date of death: 11 August 2019 (aged 76)
- Height: 5 ft 8 in (1.73 m)
- Position: Winger

Youth career
- Bellshill Athletic
- Sunderland

Senior career*
Years	Team	Apps	(Gls)
1959–1962	Sunderland	18	(1)
1962–1963	Brighton & Hove Albion	21	(3)
1963–1964	Crewe Alexandra	5	(1)
1964–1969	Albion Rovers	145	(38)
1969	Queen of the South	4	(1)
1969–1970	Stranraer	11	(2)
1970–197?	Hamilton Academical	1	(0)
- Ashfield
- * Club domestic league appearances and goals

John Dillon (9 November 1942 – 11 August 2019) was a Scottish former professional footballer who played as a winger for Sunderland, Brighton & Hove Albion and Crewe Alexandra in the English Football League and for Albion Rovers, Queen of the South, Stranraer and Hamilton Academical in the Scottish League. He began his career with junior club Bellshill Athletic and later played for Ashfield.

Dillon went on to become a councillor in the Monklands district. He died in August 2019 at the age of 76.
