= Stan Anderson =

English footballer and manager (1933–2018)

Personal information
- Full name: Stanley Anderson
- Date of birth: 27 February 1933
- Place of birth: Horden, England
- Date of death: 10 June 2018 (aged 85)
- Position: Midfielder

Senior career*
Years	Team	Apps	(Gls)
1952–1963	Sunderland	402	(31)
1963–1965	Newcastle United	81	(13)
1965–1966	Middlesbrough	21	(2)
Total		504	(46)

International career
1955–1957	England U23	3	(0)
1957	England B	1	(0)
1962	England	2	(0)

Managerial career
- 1966–1973: Middlesbrough
- 1973–1974: AEK Athens
- 1974: Queens Park Rangers
- 1975–1978: Doncaster Rovers
- 1980–1981: Bolton Wanderers
- * Club domestic league appearances and goals

Stanley Anderson (27 February 1933 – 10 June 2018) was an English football player and manager. He is the only player ever to have played for and captained all the big three North-East teams, Sunderland, Newcastle and Middlesbrough.

== Club career ==
Anderson seemed set to finish his career with Sunderland, but after 400 appearances and 12 years he signed for Newcastle United for £35,000 in November 1963.

== Managerial career ==
Anderson succeeded Raich Carter as Middlesbrough manager in April 1966 and remained at the club until resigning in April 1973 to be replaced by Jack Charlton. In his time the club were relegated from and promoted to the Football League second division. After leaving Middlesbrough he managed in Greece for AEK Athens and in England, where he became boss at Queens Park Rangers, Doncaster Rovers and Bolton Wanderers before giving up management after resigning in 1981. He continued as a scout for various clubs including Newcastle.

== Death ==
Anderson died on 10 June 2018, the age of 85.
