= Jimmy O'Neill (footballer, born 1941) =

Northern Irish footballer

Jimmy O'Neill (born 24 November 1941) was a Northern Irish footballer who played for Sunderland and the Northern Ireland national football team as a forward.

== Club career ==
O'Neill made his first appearance for Sunderland on 13 January 1962 against Bristol Rovers in a 6–1 win at Roker Park where he scored two goals. Overall, during 1961 to 1962 he made 7 league appearances, scoring 6 goals before moving to Walsall. He spent from 1962 to 1965 at Walsall, but only managed to make 38 appearances, scoring 13 goals. He then moved to Australia with Melbourne Hakoah before returning to England with Darlington. At his time with Darlington he made 23 appearances, and scored four goals. O'Neill returned to Northern Ireland with Coleraine before finishing his career back in Australia with Melbourne Hakoah.

== International career ==
He won his first cap for Northern Ireland on 11 April 1962 against Wales in a 4–0 defeat. This proved to be his first and only cap for his country.
