= Ray Lancaster =

English footballer

Personal information
- Full name: Raymond Lancaster
- Date of birth: 17 August 1941 (age 85)
- Place of birth: Maltby, Yorkshire, England
- Position: Wing half

Youth career
- –: Rotherham United

Senior career*
Years	Team	Apps	(Gls)
1958–1964	Rotherham United	64	(2)
1964–1967	Grimsby Town	18	(0)
1967–1968	Lincoln City	24	(0)
1968–1969	Boston United		
–	Skegness Town		
–	Boston		
- * Club domestic league appearances and goals

Raymond Lancaster (born 17 August 1941) is an English former footballer who made 106 appearances in the Football League playing for Rotherham United, Grimsby Town and Lincoln City. He played as a wing half. He then spent a season in the Northern Premier League with Boston United, and also played for Skegness Town and Boston.
