= Dickie Rooks =

English footballer and manager (1940–2024)

Personal information
- Full name: Richard Rooks
- Date of birth: 29 May 1940
- Place of birth: Sunderland, England
- Date of death: 6 April 2024 (aged 83)
- Place of death: Sunderland, England
- Position: Centre half

Youth career
- Sunderland

Senior career*
Years	Team	Apps	(Gls)
1957–1965	Sunderland	34	(2)
1965–1969	Middlesbrough	136	(14)
1969–1972	Bristol City	96	(4)
1972–197?	Willington		

Managerial career
- 1972–197?: Willington player coach
- 1974–1976: Scunthorpe United
- 197?–197?: Zanzibar
- * Club domestic league appearances and goals

Richard Rooks (29 May 1940 – 6 April 2024) was an English footballer who played as a centre half. He made over 260 Football League appearances in the years after the Second World War.

== Career ==
Rooks played locally for Sunderland youth teams. He signed professional in June 1957 for Sunderland. He moved from Sunderland for £20,000 to Middlesbrough in August 1965. Alan Dicks signed Rooks for £17,000 in June 1969 for Bristol City.

Rooks left Bristol City in July 1972 to become the player-coach at Willington. He then joined Scunthorpe United in November 1974 as manager for 14 months before being sacked in January 1976. Scunthorpe United had finished 24th and bottom of the Fourth Division in 1974–75 and been forced to seek re-election. Rooks then coached Zanzibar and was an FA Coach for Tyne & Wear linked to Sunderland's School of Excellence.

When Rooks retired from football he became a self-employed builder in his home town Sunderland.

== Death ==
Rooks died on 6 April 2024, at the age of 83.

== Honours ==
Middlesbrough

- Football League Third Division runner-up: 1966–67
