= Jackie Overfield =

English footballer (1932–2022)

Personal information
- Full name: Jack Overfield
- Date of birth: 14 May 1932
- Place of birth: Leeds, England
- Date of death: 29 December 2022 (aged 90)
- Place of death: Leeds, England
- Height: 1.77 m (5 ft 10 in)
- Position: Left winger

Youth career
- Ashley Road Methodists

Senior career*
Years	Team	Apps	(Gls)
- Yorkshire Amateur
1953–1960	Leeds United	159	(20)
1960–1963	Sunderland	65	(5)
1963–1964	Peterborough United	1	(0)
1964–1965	Bradford City	11	(0)
Total		236	(25)
- * Club domestic league appearances and goals

Jackie Overfield (14 May 1932 – 29 December 2022) was an English professional footballer who played as a left winger.

== Career ==
Born in Leeds, Overfield attended Victoria Road School. He spent his early career with Ashley Road Methodists and Yorkshire Amateur before signing for Leeds United in 1953. He later played for Sunderland, Peterborough United, and Bradford City.

Overfield died in Leeds on 29 December 2022, at the age of 90.
