= Colin Nelson (footballer, born 1938) =

English footballer (1938–2026)

Personal information
- Full name: Colin Armstrong Nelson
- Date of birth: 13 March 1938
- Place of birth: Boldon, England
- Date of death: 20 November 2025 (aged 87)
- Position: Right back

Senior career*
Years	Team	Apps	(Gls)
1958–1965	Sunderland	146	(2)
1965–1966	Mansfield Town	38	(0)
Total		184	(2)
- * Club domestic league appearances and goals

Colin Nelson (13 March 1938 – 20 November 2025) was an English footballer who played for Sunderland as a full back.

Nelson died on 20 November 2025, at the age of 87.

== Club career ==
Nelson made his debut for Sunderland against Bristol City in a 4–1 on 25 October 1958 at Ashton Gate. In total he made 146 league appearances, scoring two goals at his time with the club from 1958 to 1964. He then moved to Mansfield Town, where he made 38 appearances without scoring from 1964 to 1966.
