= 1963–64 Football League =

65th season of the Football League

The Football League
- Season: 1963–64
- Champions: Liverpool

The 1963–64 season was the 65th completed season of The Football League.

== Final league tables ==
The tables and results below are reproduced here in the exact form that they can be found at The Rec.Sport.Soccer Statistics Foundation website and in Rothmans Book of Football League Records 1888–89 to 1978–79, with home and away statistics separated.

Beginning with the season 1894–95, clubs finishing level on points were separated according to goal average (goals scored divided by goals conceded), or more properly put, goal ratio. In case one or more teams had the same goal difference, this system favoured those teams who had scored fewer goals. The goal average system was eventually scrapped beginning with the 1976–77 season.

Since the Fourth Division was established in the 1958–59 season, the bottom four teams of that division have been required to apply for re-election.

== First Division ==
First Division
- Season: 1963–64
- Champions: Liverpool; 6th English title
- Relegated: Bolton Wanderers; Ipswich Town
- European Cup: Liverpool
- Cup Winners' Cup: West Ham United
- Inter-Cities Fairs Cup: Manchester United; Everton
- Matches: 462
- Goals: 1,571 (3.4 per match)
- Top goalscorer: Jimmy Greaves (35 goals)
- Biggest home win: Fulham 10–1 Ipswich Town (26 December 1963)
- Biggest away win: West Ham United 2–8 Blackburn Rovers (26 December 1963)
- Highest scoring: Fulham 10–1 Ipswich Town (26 December 1963)

Pos	Team	Pld	W	D	L	GF	GA	GAv	Pts	Qualification or relegation
1	Liverpool (C)	42	26	5	11	92	45	2.044	57	Qualification for the European Cup preliminary round
2	Manchester United	42	23	7	12	90	62	1.452	53	Qualification for the Inter-Cities Fairs Cup first round
3	Everton	42	21	10	11	84	64	1.313	52	Qualification for the Inter-Cities Fairs Cup first round
4	Tottenham Hotspur	42	22	7	13	97	81	1.198	51	
5	Chelsea	42	20	10	12	72	56	1.286	50	
6	Sheffield Wednesday	42	19	11	12	84	67	1.254	49	
7	Blackburn Rovers	42	18	10	14	89	65	1.369	46	
8	Arsenal	42	17	11	14	90	82	1.098	45	
9	Burnley	42	17	10	15	71	64	1.109	44	
10	West Bromwich Albion	42	16	11	15	70	61	1.148	43	
11	Leicester City	42	16	11	15	61	58	1.052	43	
12	Sheffield United	42	16	11	15	61	64	0.953	43	
13	Nottingham Forest	42	16	9	17	64	68	0.941	41	
14	West Ham United	42	14	12	16	69	74	0.932	40	Qualification for the European Cup Winners' Cup first round
15	Fulham	42	13	13	16	58	65	0.892	39	
16	Wolverhampton Wanderers	42	12	15	15	70	80	0.875	39	
17	Stoke City	42	14	10	18	77	78	0.987	38	
18	Blackpool	42	13	9	20	52	73	0.712	35	
19	Aston Villa	42	11	12	19	62	71	0.873	34	
20	Birmingham City	42	11	7	24	54	92	0.587	29	
21	Bolton Wanderers (R)	42	10	8	24	48	80	0.600	28	Relegation to the Second Division
22	Ipswich Town (R)	42	9	7	26	56	121	0.463	25	Relegation to the Second Division

Source: World Football
Rules for classification: 1) Points; 2) Goal average; 3) Goals scored
(C) Champions; (R) Relegated

=== Results ===
Home \ Away	ARS	AST	BIR	BLB	BLP	BOL	BUR	CHE	EVE	FUL	IPS	LEI	LIV	MUN	NOT	SHU	SHW	STK	TOT	WBA	WHU	WOL
Arsenal		3–0	4–1	0–0	5–3	4–3	3–2	2–4	6–0	2–2	6–0	0–1	1–1	2–1	4–2	1–3	1–1	1–1	4–4	3–2	3–3	1–3
Aston Villa	2–1		0–3	1–2	3–1	3–0	2–0	2–0	0–1	2–2	0–0	1–3	2–2	4–0	3–0	0–1	2–2	1–3	2–4	1–0	2–2	2–2
Birmingham	1–4	3–3		2–2	3–2	2–1	0–0	3–4	0–2	0–0	1–0	2–0	3–1	1–1	3–3	3–0	1–2	0–1	1–2	0–1	2–1	2–2
Blackburn Rovers	4–1	2–0	3–0		1–2	3–0	1–2	2–2	1–2	2–0	3–1	5–2	1–2	1–3	2–0	2–2	1–1	1–0	7–2	0–2	1–3	1–1
Blackpool	0–1	0–4	3–0	3–2		2–0	1–1	1–5	1–1	1–0	2–2	3–3	0–1	1–0	1–0	2–2	2–2	1–0	0–2	1–0	0–1	1–2
Bolton Wanderers	1–1	1–1	0–2	0–5	1–1		2–1	1–0	1–3	2–1	6–0	0–0	1–2	0–1	2–3	3–0	3–0	3–4	1–3	1–2	1–1	0–4
Burnley	0–3	2–0	2–1	3–0	1–0	1–1		0–0	2–3	4–1	3–1	2–0	0–3	6–1	1–1	1–2	3–1	1–0	7–2	3–2	3–1	1–0
Chelsea	3–1	1–0	2–3	1–0	1–0	4–0	2–0		1–0	1–2	4–0	1–0	1–3	1–1	1–0	3–2	1–2	3–3	0–3	3–1	0–0	2–3
Everton	2–1	4–2	3–0	2–4	3–1	2–0	3–4	1–1		3–0	1–1	0–3	3–1	4–0	6–1	4–1	3–2	2–0	1–0	1–1	2–0	3–3
Fulham	1–4	2–0	2–1	1–1	1–1	3–1	2–1	0–1	2–2		10–1	2–1	1–0	2–2	0–0	3–1	2–0	3–3	1–1	1–1	2–0	4–1
Ipswich Town	1–2	4–3	3–2	0–0	4–3	1–3	3–1	1–3	0–0	4–2		1–1	1–2	2–7	4–3	1–0	1–4	0–2	2–3	1–2	3–2	1–0
Leicester City	7–2	0–0	3–0	4–3	2–3	1–0	0–0	2–4	2–0	0–1	2–1		0–2	3–2	1–1	0–1	2–0	2–1	0–1	0–2	2–2	0–1
Liverpool	5–0	5–2	2–1	1–2	1–2	2–0	2–0	2–1	2–1	2–0	6–0	0–1		3–0	1–2	6–1	3–1	6–1	3–1	1–0	1–2	6–0
Manchester United	3–1	1–0	1–2	2–2	3–0	5–0	5–1	1–1	5–1	3–0	2–0	3–1	0–1		3–1	2–1	3–1	5–2	4–1	1–0	0–1	2–2
Nottingham Forest	2–0	0–1	4–0	1–1	0–1	3–1	1–3	0–1	2–2	2–0	3–1	2–0	0–0	1–2		3–3	3–2	0–0	1–2	0–3	3–1	3–0
Sheffield United	2–2	1–1	3–0	0–1	1–0	0–1	2–0	1–1	0–0	1–0	3–1	0–1	3–0	1–2	1–2		1–1	4–1	3–3	2–1	2–1	4–3
Sheffield Wednesday	0–4	1–0	2–1	5–2	1–0	3–0	3–1	3–2	0–3	3–0	3–1	1–2	2–2	3–3	3–1	3–0		2–0	2–0	2–2	3–0	5–0
Stoke City	1–2	2–2	4–1	3–1	1–2	0–1	4–4	2–0	3–2	1–1	9–1	3–3	3–1	3–1	0–1	0–2	4–4		2–1	1–1	3–0	0–2
Tottenham Hotspur	3–1	3–1	6–1	4–1	6–1	1–0	3–2	1–2	2–4	1–0	6–3	1–1	1–3	2–3	4–1	0–0	1–1	2–1		0–2	3–0	4–3
West Bromwich Albion	4–0	4–3	3–1	1–3	2–1	1–1	0–0	1–1	4–2	3–0	2–1	1–1	2–2	1–4	2–3	2–0	1–3	2–3	4–4		0–1	3–1
West Ham United	1–1	0–1	5–0	2–8	3–1	2–3	1–1	2–2	4–2	1–1	2–2	2–2	1–0	0–2	0–2	2–3	4–3	4–1	4–0	4–2		1–1
Wolverhampton Wanderers	2–2	3–3	5–1	1–5	1–1	2–2	1–1	4–1	0–0	4–0	2–1	1–2	1–3	2–0	2–3	1–1	1–1	2–1	1–4	0–0	0–2	

Updated to match(es) played on unknown. Source: Ian Laschke: Rothmans Book of Football League Records 1888–89 to 1978–79. Macdonald and Jane’s, London & Sydney, 1980.
Legend: Blue = home team win; Yellow = draw; Red = away team win.

=== Maps ===
Locations of the Football League First Division London teams 1963–1964
Locations of the Football League First Division 1963–1964 teams

== Second Division ==
Second Division
- Season: 1963–64
- Champions: Leeds United
- Promoted: Leeds United; Sunderland
- Relegated: Grimsby Town; Scunthorpe United
- Cup Winners' Cup: Cardiff City
- Matches: 462
- Goals: 1,467 (3.18 per match)
- Top goalscorer: Ron Saunders (33 goals)
- Biggest home win: Manchester City 8–1 Scunthorpe United (26 December 1963)
- Biggest away win: Newcastle United 0–4 Cardiff City (9 November 1963); Plymouth Argyle 0–4 Portsmouth (9 November 1963); Cardiff City 0–4 Preston North End (26 December 1963); Manchester City 0–4 Grimsby Town (22 February 1964); Newcastle United 0–4 Bury (11 April 1964); Bury 1–5 Southampton (21 April 1964)
- Highest scoring: Southampton 6–4 Derby County (1 April 1964)

Pos	Team	Pld	W	D	L	GF	GA	GAv	Pts	Qualification or relegation
1	Leeds United (C, P)	42	24	15	3	71	34	2.088	63	Promotion to the First Division
2	Sunderland (P)	42	25	11	6	81	37	2.189	61	Promotion to the First Division
3	Preston North End	42	23	10	9	79	54	1.463	56	
4	Charlton Athletic	42	19	10	13	76	70	1.086	48	
5	Southampton	42	19	9	14	100	73	1.370	47	
6	Manchester City	42	18	10	14	84	66	1.273	46	
7	Rotherham United	42	19	7	16	90	78	1.154	45	
8	Newcastle United	42	20	5	17	74	69	1.072	45	
9	Portsmouth	42	16	11	15	79	70	1.129	43	
10	Middlesbrough	42	15	11	16	67	52	1.288	41	
11	Northampton Town	42	16	9	17	58	60	0.967	41	
12	Huddersfield Town	42	15	10	17	57	64	0.891	40	
13	Derby County	42	14	11	17	56	67	0.836	39	
14	Swindon Town	42	14	10	18	57	69	0.826	38	
15	Cardiff City	42	14	10	18	56	81	0.691	38	Qualification for the European Cup Winners' Cup first round
16	Leyton Orient	42	13	10	19	54	72	0.750	36	
17	Norwich City	42	11	13	18	64	80	0.800	35	
18	Bury	42	13	9	20	57	73	0.781	35	
19	Swansea Town	42	12	9	21	63	74	0.851	33	
20	Plymouth Argyle	42	8	16	18	45	67	0.672	32	
21	Grimsby Town (R)	42	9	14	19	47	75	0.627	32	Relegation to the Third Division
22	Scunthorpe United (R)	42	10	10	22	52	82	0.634	30	Relegation to the Third Division

Rules for classification: 1) Points; 2) Goal average; 3) Goals scored
(C) Champions; (P) Promoted; (R) Relegated

=== Results ===
Home \ Away	BRY	CAR	CHA	DER	GRI	HUD	LEE	LEY	MCI	MID	NEW	NOR	NWC	PLY	POR	PNE	ROT	SCU	SOU	SUN	SWA	SWI
Bury		4–1	0–2	1–2	1–1	0–2	1–2	1–2	1–1	1–1	1–2	1–1	4–2	2–2	3–2	2–1	4–2	3–2	1–5	0–1	3–2	1–0
Cardiff City	2–1		1–1	2–1	0–0	2–1	0–0	2–1	2–2	1–1	2–2	1–0	3–1	3–1	1–2	0–4	2–1	3–1	2–4	0–2	1–1	1–0
Charlton Athletic	3–0	5–2		2–0	2–1	5–2	0–2	1–2	4–3	2–4	1–2	1–1	3–1	1–0	0–1	3–0	4–3	0–1	2–2	0–0	3–1	2–2
Derby County	2–1	2–1	1–1		0–0	2–0	1–1	1–0	1–3	2–2	1–2	0–0	2–1	3–1	3–1	1–2	1–4	2–2	3–2	0–3	3–0	3–0
Grimsby Town	1–0	0–2	0–2	1–3		2–2	0–2	1–1	1–1	3–1	2–1	4–1	3–1	1–1	0–3	0–3	1–3	2–0	2–2	2–2	1–1	1–2
Huddersfield Town	2–1	2–1	2–1	0–0	1–2		0–2	2–1	0–2	1–0	3–0	0–1	1–1	4–3	1–1	2–2	0–3	3–2	4–0	0–2	1–0	2–0
Leeds United	3–0	1–1	1–1	2–2	3–1	1–1		2–1	1–0	2–0	2–1	0–0	4–2	1–1	3–1	1–1	1–0	1–0	3–1	1–1	2–1	0–0
Leyton Orient	1–1	4–0	0–3	3–0	0–0	2–3	0–2		0–2	3–2	1–0	0–0	1–1	1–0	3–6	2–2	0–2	2–2	1–0	2–5	4–0	2–1
Manchester City	1–1	4–0	1–3	3–2	0–4	5–2	3–2	2–0		1–0	3–1	3–0	5–0	1–1	0–2	2–3	6–1	8–1	1–1	0–3	1–0	0–0
Middlesbrough	2–0	3–1	2–3	3–0	6–0	1–1	1–3	2–0	2–2		3–0	1–0	0–1	5–0	3–1	3–0	2–2	2–0	1–0	2–0	2–1	1–1
Newcastle United	0–4	0–4	5–0	3–1	4–0	2–0	0–1	3–0	3–1	2–0		2–3	2–0	1–1	1–0	2–4	5–2	3–1	2–2	1–0	4–1	4–1
Northampton Town	1–2	2–1	1–2	0–1	1–2	1–0	0–3	1–2	2–1	3–2	2–2		3–2	0–0	2–1	0–3	1–3	2–0	2–0	5–1	2–3	4–0
Norwich City	0–1	5–1	1–3	3–0	2–0	2–2	2–2	1–2	1–2	1–1	3–1	3–3		1–1	3–1	2–1	2–2	2–1	1–1	2–3	3–0	3–2
Plymouth Argyle	1–0	1–1	1–1	0–0	3–2	0–0	0–1	2–2	2–1	2–0	3–4	0–3	1–2		0–4	0–2	0–0	3–1	1–1	1–1	3–2	2–4
Portsmouth	3–3	5–0	4–1	1–1	2–2	2–1	1–1	4–3	2–2	1–0	5–2	3–0	1–1	1–2		1–2	2–1	3–4	2–0	2–4	0–0	1–4
Preston North End	3–0	4–0	3–1	0–2	1–0	2–1	2–0	0–0	2–0	2–2	3–0	2–1	3–0	0–0	0–0		2–2	1–0	2–1	1–1	3–3	1–0
Rotherham United	6–2	1–0	5–0	2–0	1–0	3–1	2–2	2–4	1–2	2–1	2–3	1–0	4–0	3–1	4–2	4–2		2–1	2–3	2–2	3–0	0–0
Scunthorpe United	0–0	1–2	1–1	3–2	2–2	1–0	0–1	0–0	2–4	1–0	2–0	1–2	2–2	1–0	1–1	1–0	4–3		1–2	1–1	2–2	3–0
Southampton	0–1	3–2	6–1	6–4	6–0	1–1	1–4	3–0	4–2	2–2	2–0	3–1	3–0	1–2	2–3	4–5	6–1	7–2		0–0	4–0	5–1
Sunderland	4–1	3–3	2–1	3–0	3–0	3–2	2–0	4–1	2–0	0–0	2–1	0–2	0–0	1–0	3–0	4–0	2–0	1–0	1–2		1–0	6–0
Swansea Town	0–2	3–0	1–2	2–1	1–1	1–2	0–3	1–0	3–3	2–1	0–1	1–1	3–1	2–1	1–1	5–1	4–2	4–1	6–0	1–2		3–0
Swindon Town	2–1	1–2	2–2	0–0	2–1	1–2	2–2	5–0	3–0	2–0	0–0	2–3	2–2	2–1	2–0	1–4	3–1	3–0	1–2	1–0	2–1	

Updated to match(es) played on unknown. Source: Ian Laschke: Rothmans Book of Football League Records 1888–89 to 1978–79. Macdonald and Jane’s, London & Sydney, 1980.
Legend: Blue = home team win; Yellow = draw; Red = away team win.

=== Maps ===
Locations of the Football League Second Division London teams 1963–1964
Locations of the Football League Second Division 1963–1964 teams

== Third Division ==
Football League Third Division
- Season: 1963–64
- Champions: Coventry City (1st title)
- Promoted: Crystal Palace
- Relegated: Crewe Alexandra, Millwall, Notts County, Wrexham
- Matches: 552
- Goals: 1,730 (3.13 per match)
- Top goalscorer: Alfie Biggs (Bristol Rovers), 30
- Biggest home win: Brentford v Wrexham 9–0
- Biggest away win: Brentford v Luton Town 2–6; Luton Town v Crystal Palace 0–4; Wrexham v Oldham Athletic 0–4
- Highest scoring: Brentford v Wrexham 9–0; Coventry City v Shrewsbury Town 8–1; Queens Park Rangers v Coventry City 3–6; Queens Park Rangers v Southend United 4–5; Wrexham v Barnsley 7–2; Wrexham v Colchester United 5–4

Pos	Team	Pld	W	D	L	GF	GA	GAv	Pts	Promotion or relegation
1	Coventry City (C, P)	46	22	16	8	98	61	1.607	60	Promotion to the Second Division
2	Crystal Palace (P)	46	23	14	9	73	51	1.431	60	Promotion to the Second Division
3	Watford	46	23	12	11	79	59	1.339	58	
4	Bournemouth & Boscombe Athletic	46	24	8	14	79	58	1.362	56	
5	Bristol City	46	20	15	11	84	64	1.313	55	
6	Reading	46	21	10	15	79	62	1.274	52	
7	Mansfield Town	46	20	11	15	76	62	1.226	51	
8	Hull City	46	16	17	13	73	68	1.074	49	
9	Oldham Athletic	46	20	8	18	73	70	1.043	48	
10	Peterborough United	46	18	11	17	75	70	1.071	47	
11	Shrewsbury Town	46	18	11	17	73	80	0.913	47	
12	Bristol Rovers	46	19	8	19	91	79	1.152	46	
13	Port Vale	46	16	14	16	53	49	1.082	46	
14	Southend United	46	15	15	16	77	78	0.987	45	
15	Queens Park Rangers	46	18	9	19	76	78	0.974	45	
16	Brentford	46	15	14	17	87	80	1.088	44	
17	Colchester United	46	12	19	15	70	68	1.029	43	
18	Luton Town	46	16	10	20	64	80	0.800	42	
19	Walsall	46	13	14	19	59	76	0.776	40	
20	Barnsley	46	12	15	19	68	94	0.723	39	
21	Millwall (R)	46	14	10	22	53	67	0.791	38	Relegation to the Fourth Division
22	Crewe Alexandra (R)	46	11	12	23	50	77	0.649	34	Relegation to the Fourth Division
23	Wrexham (R)	46	13	6	27	75	107	0.701	32	Relegation to the Fourth Division
24	Notts County (R)	46	9	9	28	45	92	0.489	27	Relegation to the Fourth Division

(C) Champions; (P) Promoted; (R) Relegated

=== Results ===
Home \ Away	BAR	B&BA	BRE	BRI	BRR	COL	COV	CRE	CRY	HUL	LUT	MAN	MIL	NTC	OLD	PET	PTV	QPR	REA	SHR	STD	WAL	WAT	WRE
Barnsley		2–1	1–1	2–4	1–2	1–1	1–1	1–0	2–0	2–2	3–1	1–1	1–1	2–1	2–2	3–2	0–0	3–1	0–3	2–1	0–1	1–3	0–0	3–0
Bournemouth & Boscombe Athletic	4–1		2–0	0–1	1–0	2–2	2–1	3–0	4–3	1–0	3–1	0–0	4–0	1–1	1–0	3–0	3–0	4–2	1–2	2–0	1–0	1–1	2–0	2–0
Brentford	1–1	2–0		1–2	2–5	3–1	2–3	2–2	2–1	1–3	2–6	4–0	3–1	4–1	2–0	2–0	1–2	2–2	4–2	0–1	3–0	1–1	1–2	9–0
Bristol City	5–2	3–1	3–3		3–0	3–1	0–1	1–1	1–1	1–0	5–1	2–3	0–0	2–0	3–1	3–1	0–0	2–1	0–2	2–2	2–2	5–1	2–0	4–0
Bristol Rovers	1–1	2–3	3–1	4–0		3–1	0–1	1–2	1–3	4–0	1–2	3–2	2–2	4–0	0–1	2–2	4–4	0–0	2–5	7–0	3–1	3–0	1–2	1–1
Colchester United	4–1	1–2	1–2	1–1	2–3		2–1	4–0	1–1	1–1	1–1	1–1	2–0	4–0	2–3	4–1	1–2	2–0	2–1	1–0	3–3	0–0	1–1	4–1
Coventry City	3–1	2–2	2–2	2–1	4–2	1–0		5–1	5–1	2–2	3–3	0–3	3–0	2–0	4–1	3–2	1–1	4–2	0–0	8–1	2–5	1–0	2–2	3–0
Crewe Alexandra	1–2	1–0	1–1	2–0	4–1	1–1	2–2		0–2	1–4	1–0	3–2	1–0	0–1	1–0	0–0	1–0	2–0	2–2	3–2	1–2	0–1	0–1	1–2
Crystal Palace	1–2	2–1	1–0	1–0	1–0	0–0	1–1	1–0		2–2	1–1	3–1	2–1	2–0	1–3	1–0	2–0	1–0	4–1	3–0	3–0	1–0	2–0	2–1
Hull City	2–2	3–4	0–0	4–4	0–2	0–0	2–1	2–1	1–1		2–0	3–1	0–0	4–1	0–1	0–0	4–1	3–0	1–1	4–2	1–0	3–1	2–2	4–2
Luton Town	2–3	1–0	0–2	1–4	4–2	3–1	1–3	3–3	0–4	2–1		0–2	1–3	2–0	1–2	2–3	1–0	4–4	2–1	2–0	4–1	1–0	2–1	3–1
Mansfield Town	2–1	1–1	2–2	4–0	2–0	1–1	3–2	2–1	1–1	2–0	1–1		4–1	4–0	1–1	4–1	1–1	1–0	2–1	3–1	4–1	2–1	1–1	3–1
Millwall	4–2	3–0	1–3	0–1	0–1	0–1	0–0	1–0	0–1	0–1	3–0	0–1		6–1	2–1	0–2	3–1	2–2	2–0	2–2	1–1	2–1	0–3	1–4
Notts County	1–1	1–3	2–0	1–1	3–4	3–1	0–3	0–0	1–1	0–1	1–1	1–0	2–0		4–2	0–0	2–0	2–2	0–1	0–1	1–1	0–1	1–2	3–0
Oldham Athletic	2–0	2–4	4–1	1–2	2–2	2–2	2–0	3–2	3–1	1–1	0–1	1–0	1–2	2–0		4–2	1–0	2–1	3–1	2–4	0–3	2–4	1–0	3–2
Peterborough United	3–2	2–1	3–0	4–2	2–2	4–0	2–0	3–2	1–1	5–1	0–0	1–3	2–3	5–1	0–0		1–1	2–1	1–0	2–2	3–0	1–2	0–1	5–2
Port Vale	1–0	0–0	3–0	4–1	1–0	0–2	1–1	4–0	1–2	1–0	1–0	1–0	1–0	0–1	1–0	1–2		2–0	0–0	1–1	4–1	2–2	0–0	5–0
Queens Park Rangers	2–2	1–0	2–2	0–2	1–0	0–0	3–6	2–0	3–4	0–2	1–1	2–0	2–0	3–2	3–2	3–0	3–0		4–2	3–4	4–5	3–0	1–0	1–0
Reading	6–1	2–0	4–3	1–1	3–1	5–3	2–2	2–2	0–0	2–0	1–1	4–3	1–0	3–2	0–1	1–0	1–0	1–2		2–0	4–2	0–1	2–0	2–1
Shrewsbury Town	3–1	5–2	1–1	2–0	0–1	1–1	0–0	3–0	1–1	5–1	1–0	2–0	0–1	5–2	2–0	0–0	1–0	1–2	2–1		2–2	2–1	3–0	1–2
Southend	4–1	1–1	2–1	1–1	3–4	0–0	1–2	1–1	2–1	1–1	0–1	2–1	1–1	3–1	2–2	2–0	1–1	1–3	2–0	7–1		1–1	3–0	1–1
Walsall	4–4	0–2	2–2	1–1	2–3	1–1	0–3	2–1	2–2	1–1	4–0	3–1	0–2	2–1	1–1	2–0	2–1	0–2	1–1	1–1	2–0		1–3	0–2
Watford	2–1	3–0	2–2	2–2	3–2	3–1	1–1	4–1	3–1	3–3	2–0	3–0	2–2	2–0	2–1	1–2	1–1	3–1	1–0	2–1	3–1	5–3		4–2
Wrexham	7–2	3–4	2–4	1–1	1–2	5–4	1–1	1–1	2–2	3–1	2–0	2–0	3–0	4–0	0–4	2–3	1–2	0–1	0–3	2–3	1–3	4–0	3–1	

Updated to match(es) played on unknown. Source: Ian Laschke: Rothmans Book of Football League Records 1888–89 to 1978–79. Macdonald and Jane’s, London & Sydney, 1980.
Legend: Blue = home team win; Yellow = draw; Red = away team win.

=== Maps ===
Locations of the Football League Third Division London teams 1963–1964
Locations of the Football League Third Division teams 1963–1964

== Fourth Division ==
Football League Fourth Division
- Season: 1963–64
- Champions: Gillingham (1st title)
- Promoted: Carlisle United, Exeter City, Workington
- Failed re-election: none
- Matches: 552
- Goals: 1,631 (2.95 per match)
- Top goalscorer: Hughie McIlmoyle (Carlisle United), 39
- Biggest home win: Doncaster Rovers v Darlington 10–0
- Biggest away win: Hartlepools United v Carlisle United 0–6
- Highest scoring: Torquay United v Newport County 8–3

Pos	Team	Pld	W	D	L	GF	GA	GAv	Pts	Promotion or relegation
1	Gillingham (C, P)	46	23	14	9	59	30	1.967	60	Promotion to the Third Division
2	Carlisle United (P)	46	25	10	11	113	58	1.948	60	Promotion to the Third Division
3	Workington (P)	46	24	11	11	76	52	1.462	59	Promotion to the Third Division
4	Exeter City (P)	46	20	18	8	62	37	1.676	58	Promotion to the Third Division
5	Bradford City	46	25	6	15	76	62	1.226	56	
6	Torquay United	46	20	11	15	80	54	1.481	51	
7	Tranmere Rovers	46	20	11	15	85	73	1.164	51	
8	Brighton & Hove Albion	46	19	12	15	71	52	1.365	50	
9	Aldershot	46	19	10	17	83	78	1.064	48	
10	Halifax Town	46	17	14	15	77	77	1.000	48	
11	Lincoln City	46	19	9	18	67	75	0.893	47	
12	Chester	46	19	8	19	65	60	1.083	46	
13	Bradford (Park Avenue)	46	18	9	19	75	81	0.926	45	
14	Doncaster Rovers	46	15	12	19	70	75	0.933	42	
15	Newport County	46	17	8	21	64	73	0.877	42	
16	Chesterfield	46	15	12	19	57	71	0.803	42	
17	Stockport County	46	15	12	19	50	68	0.735	42	
18	Oxford United	46	14	13	19	59	63	0.937	41	
19	Darlington	46	14	12	20	66	93	0.710	40	
20	Rochdale	46	12	15	19	56	59	0.949	39	
21	Southport	46	15	9	22	63	88	0.716	39	Re-elected
22	York City	46	14	7	25	52	66	0.788	35	Re-elected
23	Hartlepools United	46	12	9	25	54	93	0.581	33	Re-elected
24	Barrow	46	6	18	22	51	93	0.548	30	Re-elected

Source: rsssf.com
(C) Champions; (P) Promoted

=== Results ===
Home \ Away	ALD	BRW	BRA	BPA	B&HA	CRL	CHE	CHF	DAR	DON	EXE	GIL	HAL	HAR	LIN	NPC	OXF	ROC	SOU	STP	TOR	TRA	WRK	YOR
Aldershot		8–2	2–3	0–3	1–0	3–2	2–1	0–2	1–2	4–2	0–1	1–1	0–0	4–1	2–0	2–0	2–0	1–1	3–1	7–0	1–0	5–4	4–0	5–2
Barrow	0–2		2–3	2–2	1–1	2–2	2–2	5–2	3–1	0–2	1–1	0–3	0–0	1–2	2–0	1–1	1–1	1–2	1–3	1–2	1–0	1–1	1–1	1–2
Bradford City	3–0	7–1		1–0	3–1	2–2	1–1	4–2	1–2	2–1	1–2	0–2	0–0	2–0	4–0	2–1	2–1	2–0	2–0	1–0	2–1	0–3	0–2	3–2
Bradford Park Avenue	2–1	1–0	1–3		2–1	1–1	4–0	0–1	4–1	3–1	3–2	1–0	4–4	3–1	0–1	2–5	5–2	2–2	3–0	2–2	1–1	4–2	1–0	1–3
Brighton & Hove Albion	3–1	2–0	1–2	0–1		1–3	0–0	1–1	2–0	4–0	1–2	2–1	3–0	4–1	5–1	1–2	2–1	3–1	1–0	1–2	3–0	1–1	1–2	3–0
Carlisle United	4–0	4–1	1–2	4–0	0–1		3–1	1–0	3–3	6–0	3–0	3–1	3–0	7–1	5–0	3–3	2–1	1–0	5–2	0–0	0–1	5–2	3–1	4–0
Chester	2–0	2–0	3–0	1–0	0–0	4–2		4–2	0–1	1–1	2–0	1–0	5–2	2–1	3–1	3–0	0–2	2–0	5–0	2–1	2–1	0–2	2–1	1–1
Chesterfield	4–0	1–1	3–2	1–2	1–0	2–0	1–0		2–1	3–3	0–1	0–3	2–2	0–2	1–3	0–1	0–0	1–1	1–0	1–1	1–1	1–1	2–2	1–0
Darlington	0–1	3–3	1–2	2–2	1–2	1–6	1–0	3–2		2–0	1–1	1–1	0–0	0–0	1–1	3–1	3–0	3–2	2–2	2–3	2–0	3–5	1–1	4–2
Doncaster Rovers	1–1	3–1	2–1	3–2	1–1	1–1	3–2	1–1	10–0		1–0	1–2	3–1	2–2	0–0	1–1	0–1	2–0	3–0	4–1	1–0	1–2	2–3	0–0
Exeter City	0–0	0–0	4–1	2–3	0–0	1–0	3–0	6–1	1–1	3–1		0–0	0–0	2–1	0–0	3–1	3–2	0–1	1–1	2–0	0–0	5–0	2–1	1–0
Gillingham	2–0	3–1	0–0	2–0	1–0	2–0	2–1	1–0	2–1	1–1	0–0		2–1	2–0	1–0	1–1	2–0	0–0	5–1	0–0	2–0	2–2	3–1	1–0
Halifax Town	3–3	1–0	0–1	2–1	2–2	1–2	1–0	3–2	2–2	0–2	2–0	0–0		4–1	0–2	2–0	3–1	3–2	4–1	4–2	5–1	2–0	1–3	2–0
Hartlepool	1–4	0–0	1–0	4–2	2–2	0–6	2–0	1–0	0–2	2–1	1–1	0–0	1–1		1–2	1–1	2–1	1–1	2–3	3–0	1–4	3–2	1–2	0–1
Lincoln City	3–3	3–0	1–2	3–0	0–2	0–2	3–2	5–2	3–1	3–1	1–1	0–3	4–0	4–2		2–1	3–2	2–0	2–0	1–0	3–2	0–1	0–2	3–2
Newport County	2–1	3–0	3–1	4–0	2–0	1–4	0–1	0–1	1–2	1–0	0–1	0–1	4–2	2–1	4–2		1–0	1–1	3–0	3–1	0–3	0–2	0–0	0–0
Oxford United	1–1	0–0	1–1	2–1	1–3	1–2	2–1	1–2	5–0	0–1	0–2	3–1	2–2	5–1	2–0	2–1		1–1	0–0	1–0	1–0	0–2	2–1	4–4
Rochdale	2–2	1–3	1–2	0–0	1–1	1–1	1–0	0–1	2–1	2–2	1–3	2–1	4–1	2–0	2–2	0–1	0–0		4–0	1–0	1–2	1–1	5–0	2–0
Southport	4–1	3–3	3–3	0–1	3–3	3–0	0–2	0–1	3–1	3–0	1–1	1–1	3–1	2–1	1–0	4–2	1–1	2–1		2–0	1–0	2–0	0–3	0–3
Stockport County	2–2	5–0	2–1	2–1	1–1	0–3	1–0	2–1	2–0	1–3	0–0	2–0	1–2	1–0	4–0	1–0	0–0	1–0	1–4		0–0	1–1	0–0	2–0
Torquay United	3–0	1–1	4–0	6–2	3–0	3–1	5–0	1–1	3–1	1–0	1–1	1–0	3–2	4–2	2–2	8–3	0–0	1–0	3–1	4–0		1–1	2–1	0–1
Tranmere	3–0	1–1	0–1	3–1	1–2	6–1	3–3	2–1	0–2	3–0	2–1	0–0	2–2	2–3	3–0	2–3	1–3	2–1	2–0	4–2	3–1		0–2	1–0
Workington	4–0	4–1	1–0	1–1	1–0	2–2	1–1	1–2	3–0	4–1	0–0	1–0	2–4	2–0	1–1	2–0	3–1	3–0	2–1	1–1	2–1	4–2		1–0
York City	1–2	1–2	1–0	2–0	2–3	0–0	1–0	2–0	3–1	3–1	1–2	0–1	1–3	0–1	0–0	3–0	0–2	0–3	4–1	2–0	1–1	1–2	0–1	

Updated to match(es) played on unknown. Source: Ian Laschke: Rothmans Book of Football League Records 1888–89 to 1978–79. Macdonald and Jane’s, London & Sydney, 1980.
Legend: Blue = home team win; Yellow = draw; Red = away team win.

=== Maps ===
Locations of the Football League Fourth Division teams 1963–1964

== Attendances ==
=== Division One ===
No.	Club	Average	±	Highest	Lowest
1	Everton FC	49,401	-4,3%	66,515	33,090
2	Liverpool FC	45,032	4,8%	52,904	35,575
3	Manchester United	44,125	9,4%	63,206	26,072
4	Tottenham Hotspur FC	43,800	-7,5%	57,261	25,115
5	Arsenal FC	34,784	7,7%	67,857	18,221
6	Chelsea FC	31,305	6,6%	57,401	19,434
7	Stoke City FC	30,315	19,2%	45,697	16,135
8	West Ham United FC	24,591	4,1%	36,838	19,398
9	Leicester City FC	24,142	-6,6%	35,538	11,908
10	Sheffield Wednesday FC	23,402	-5,6%	42,155	17,368
11	Wolverhampton Wanderers FC	22,574	-12,5%	43,217	14,455
12	Nottingham Forest FC	22,497	1,9%	41,426	13,897
13	Aston Villa FC	22,346	-27,9%	40,147	11,427
14	Birmingham City FC	22,055	-2,1%	36,874	13,915
15	Sheffield United FC	21,654	-4,9%	35,276	13,868
16	Blackburn Rovers FC	21,543	34,6%	37,526	10,341
17	Fulham FC	21,163	-3,7%	41,770	12,199
18	West Bromwich Albion FC	20,552	10,9%	37,189	10,705
19	Burnley FC	19,755	-21,5%	35,766	10,558
20	Bolton Wanderers FC	17,018	-12,3%	36,183	8,348
21	Blackpool FC	16,540	-10,8%	29,806	10,203
22	Ipswich Town FC	16,004	-16,0%	28,113	11,187

=== Division Two ===
No.	Club	Average	±	Highest	Lowest
1	Sunderland AFC	41,262	0,9%	56,903	27,417
2	Leeds United FC	29,938	48,1%	41,167	21,208
3	Newcastle United FC	29,426	-7,0%	56,918	12,256
4	Preston North End FC	18,821	60,9%	35,612	12,933
5	Middlesbrough FC	18,786	13,5%	43,905	8,472
6	Swindon Town FC	18,502	35,3%	28,291	11,034
7	Charlton Athletic FC	18,284	36,2%	29,819	10,606
8	Manchester City FC	18,201	-26,3%	31,136	8,053
9	Southampton FC	17,217	12,8%	26,171	11,392
10	Norwich City FC	16,294	-15,1%	20,879	9,420
11	Portsmouth FC	14,681	-8,5%	29,459	8,207
12	Cardiff City FC	13,782	-11,5%	25,134	8,066
13	Plymouth Argyle FC	13,001	-18,4%	19,471	8,559
14	Northampton Town FC	12,705	-5,4%	18,177	8,047
15	Huddersfield Town AFC	12,120	-25,1%	31,270	5,158
16	Derby County FC	11,979	-0,9%	20,305	5,934
17	Swansea City AFC	10,911	5,3%	18,721	6,773
18	Leyton Orient FC	10,359	-36,9%	16,133	4,516
19	Rotherham United FC	9,959	-2,3%	21,641	6,526
20	Grimsby Town FC	9,515	-15,2%	16,442	4,949
21	Bury FC	8,169	-27,5%	18,032	4,058
22	Scunthorpe United FC	7,353	-18,9%	11,042	5,113

=== Division Three ===
No.	Club	Average	±	Highest	Lowest
1	Coventry City FC	26,017	52,2%	36,901	19,563
2	Crystal Palace FC	17,203	15,8%	27,967	12,049
3	Oldham Athletic FC	12,373	-13,3%	20,008	5,553
4	Brentford FC	11,883	4,1%	17,094	6,818
5	Watford FC	11,444	17,3%	23,410	5,612
6	Peterborough United FC	10,826	-9,9%	26,307	5,550
7	Bristol Rovers FC	10,710	8,9%	19,451	7,102
8	Millwall FC	10,501	-20,6%	22,443	5,418
9	Port Vale FC	10,056	23,7%	17,567	4,497
10	Bristol City FC	9,912	-10,9%	20,697	6,021
11	AFC Bournemouth	9,830	0,7%	16,998	6,034
12	Mansfield Town FC	9,484	-3,7%	16,755	5,423
13	Hull City AFC	8,536	16,1%	18,433	3,576
14	Southend United FC	8,483	-15,0%	14,069	4,688
15	Reading FC	8,434	4,4%	17,102	5,635
16	Queens Park Rangers FC	7,662	-23,7%	11,090	3,676
17	Walsall FC	7,308	-25,6%	17,440	3,681
18	Luton Town FC	7,188	-11,8%	19,799	4,346
19	Wrexham AFC	7,023	-30,7%	11,954	2,875
20	Shrewsbury Town FC	6,600	11,9%	13,669	3,125
21	Barnsley FC	6,479	-7,7%	17,186	3,655
22	Notts County FC	6,423	-6,4%	18,669	2,640
23	Crewe Alexandra FC	5,501	-14,5%	9,425	2,086
24	Colchester United FC	5,036	-5,1%	7,189	3,263

=== Division Four ===
No.	Club	Average	±	Highest	Lowest
1	Gillingham FC	9,902	41,2%	17,421	5,274
2	Brighton & Hove Albion FC	9,318	-6,5%	15,349	4,987
3	Carlisle United FC	8,346	46,5%	16,347	4,753
4	Exeter City FC	7,291	65,2%	16,438	5,334
5	Tranmere Rovers	7,072	-7,1%	11,434	3,513
6	Oxford United FC	6,896	-8,1%	10,546	4,300
7	Doncaster Rovers FC	6,371	1,1%	11,719	3,407
8	Chester City FC	6,182	11,6%	8,398	4,105
9	Bradford Park Avenue AFC	6,003	-19,0%	10,954	4,402
10	Bradford City AFC	5,739	43,0%	17,974	2,399
11	Lincoln City FC	5,650	22,0%	8,968	2,546
12	Chesterfield FC	5,366	-18,4%	9,684	3,045
13	Aldershot Town FC	5,275	-5,4%	8,449	2,951
14	Torquay United FC	5,199	6,4%	13,863	3,165
15	Workington AFC	4,819	69,0%	18,633	2,221
16	Stockport County FC	4,277	5,3%	7,901	1,935
17	Hartlepool United FC	4,169	6,6%	8,642	1,805
18	York City FC	3,937	-14,0%	5,460	1,653
19	Halifax Town AFC	3,800	6,7%	5,423	2,080
20	Newport County AFC	3,715	-18,2%	5,866	1,807
21	Darlington FC	3,371	-19,0%	6,376	2,159
22	Barrow AFC	3,039	-25,6%	5,420	1,533
23	Rochdale AFC	3,020	-8,6%	5,662	2,113
24	Southport FC	2,964	-13,2%	4,123	1,618

== See also ==
- 1963-64 in English football
