= Peter Wakeham =

English footballer

Personal information
- Full name: Peter Francis Wakeham
- Date of birth: 14 March 1936 (age 90)
- Place of birth: Kingsbridge, England
- Date of death: 4 March 2013 (aged 76)
- Place of death: Bridgend, Wales
- Position: Goalkeeper

Youth career
- 19??–1953: Torquay United

Senior career*
Years	Team	Apps	(Gls)
1953–1958	Torquay United	58	(0)
1958–1962	Sunderland	134	(0)
1962–1965	Charlton Athletic	55	(0)
1965–1966	Lincoln City	44	(0)
- Poole Town
- * Club domestic league appearances and goals

Peter Francis Wakeham (14 March 1936 – 4 March 2013) was an English footballer who played as a goalkeeper in the Football League for Torquay United, Sunderland, Charlton Athletic and Lincoln City.

== Club career ==
Wakeham joined Torquay United as a junior, turning professional in October 1953. With first choice Billy Hayes and his deputy George Webber in front him, he finally made his debut towards the end of the 1953–54 season, playing in the 3–2 win at home to Newport County on 19 April 1954. That was his only game that season as Webber returned for the final two games of the season. With the signing of Alf Jefferies in the 1954 close season, Wakeham again found himself third choice, behind Jefferies and Hayes, and made no first team appearances that season.

The 1955–56 season began with Jimmy Kirk as first choice, with Hayes and then Wakeham as understudies. Wakeham played the final three games of the season as Torquay won twice to finish in fifth place in Division Three (South). Wakeham began the following season as first choice, but lost his place to Mervyn Gill and played just fourteen times as Torquay finished second, missing out on promotion on goal average to Ipswich Town. He began the 1957–58 season as first choice, with Gill as his understudy, and played 36 times in the league as Torquay struggled, eventually finishing in 21st place and finding themselves in the new Fourth Division the following season.

He played four times the following season, leaving for Sunderland in September 1958. His debut for Sunderland came on 1 November 1958 against Grimsby Town in a 1–0 at Roker Park. In total he made 134 league appearances for the Wearside club. He then moved to Charlton Athletic in July 1962, and went on to make 55 league appearances for the club, until moving to Lincoln City in May 1965. For his next club he made 44 appearances during 1965 to 1966, and then spent time with Poole Town.

He was a reserve for the England Under-23 team against Rumania at Wembley in October 1957.
