= Jimmy Montgomery =

English footballer

Jimmy Montgomery BEM
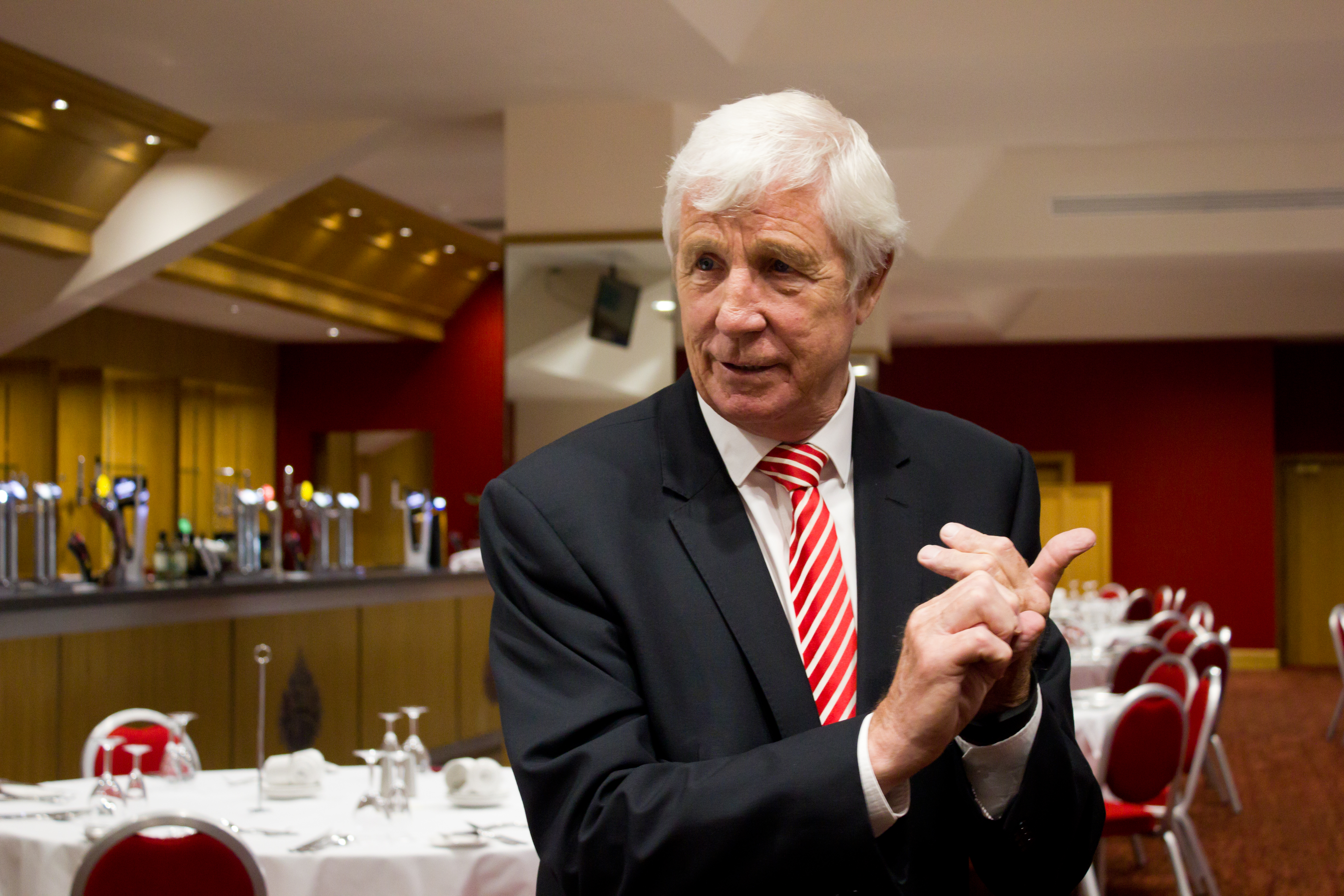
- Montgomery at the Stadium of Light, 2016

Personal information
- Date of birth: 9 October 1943 (age 83)
- Place of birth: Hendon, Sunderland, England
- Position: Goalkeeper

Youth career
- Sunderland

Senior career*
Years	Team	Apps	(Gls)
1960–1977	Sunderland	537	(0)
1967	Vancouver Royals	6	(0)
1976	→ Southampton (loan)	5	(0)
1977–1979	Birmingham City	66	(0)
1979–1980	Nottingham Forest	0	(0)
Total		614	(0)

International career
- England U23
- * Club domestic league appearances and goals

Jimmy Montgomery BEM (born 9 October 1943) is an English retired footballer who played as a goalkeeper. He made a record 627 appearances for his hometown club Sunderland with 537 of these appearances being in the league, after joining the club as a youngster in 1960.

In June 2015, Montgomery was awarded the British Empire Medal for his services to football in the Queen's birthday honours list.

== Career ==
Montgomery made his debut aged only 18 against Walsall, going on to serve 17 years at the club.

Montgomery featured for Sunderland in the 1973 FA Cup Final, where they beat Leeds United 1–0 to win the FA Cup for only the second time in their history. His most memorable contribution in that match was a double save from Trevor Cherry and Peter Lorimer which prevented Leeds from equalising. This was described in an internet article in 2012 as the greatest double save ever.

Montgomery also played for Southampton, Birmingham City and Nottingham Forest. After he retired as a player Montgomery returned to Birmingham City and Sunderland as a goalkeeping coach.

At international level, Montgomery played for the England U23 national team.

== Personal life ==
He is related to James Montgomery, also a footballer.

In October 2020, a mural of Montgomery celebrating the 1973 Sunderland FA Cup win was unveiled on The Times Inn public house overlooking the River Wear at Wear Street, Sunderland.

== Honours ==
Sunderland

- FA Cup: 1972–73
- Football League Second Division: 1975–76

Nottingham Forest

- European Cup: 1979–80

Individual

- PFA Team of the Year: 1975–76 Second Division
- British Empire Medal: 2015
