= Cecil Irwin (footballer) =

English footballer and manager (1942–2025)

Personal information
- Date of birth: 8 April 1942
- Place of birth: Ellington, Northumberland, England
- Date of death: 21 April 2025 (aged 83)
- Position: Defender

Senior career*
Years	Team	Apps	(Gls)
1958–1971	Sunderland	313	(1)
- * Club domestic league appearances and goals

Cecil Irwin (8 April 1942 – 21 April 2025) was an English footballer who played as a right-back for Sunderland.

== Playing career ==
Irwin made his debut for Sunderland on 20 September 1958 against Ipswich Town in a 2–0 defeat at Roker Park. He went on to make 313 league appearances, scoring just a single goal during his time with the club.

== Player-manager career ==
After finishing his stint with Sunderland, he moved on to Yeovil Town as a player-manager, staying with them from 1972 to 1975, when his contract was not renewed. He moved on to play for Ashington, also managing the Colliers for a year.

== Managerial career ==
Cecil continued to manage after his playing days were done, managing Ashington, just outside his hometown of Ellington twice more, first in 1996–98, and again in 2000–02, the latter time managing his squad to promotion, but unable to stick in the new league and being let go after relegation the next year.

== Death ==
Irwin died on 21 April 2025, at the age of 83.
