= UEFA European Championship records and statistics =

UEFA European Championship
- Organiser(s): UEFA
- Founded: 1958; 68 years ago
- Region: Europe
- Teams: 24 / 55
- Website: uefa.com/uefaeuro
- UEFA Euro 2024

This is a list of records and statistics of the UEFA European Championship.

== General performances ==
=== Ranking of teams by number of appearances ===
As of UEFA Euro 2024

Team	Appearances	Debut	Most recent	Best result
Germany (Note: Includes results of West Germany between 1972–1988.)	14	1972	2024	Champions (1972, 1980, 1996)
Spain	12	1964	2024	Champions (1964, 2008, 2012, 2024)
Russia (Note: Includes results of Soviet Union and CIS between 1960–1992.)	12	1960	2020	Champions (1960)
Italy	11	1968	2024	Champions (1968, 2020)
France	11	1960	2024	Champions (1984, 2000)
Netherlands	11	1976	2024	Champions (1988)
Czech Republic (Note: Includes results of Czechoslovakia between 1960–1980.)	11	1960	2024	Champions (1976)
England	11	1968	2024	Runners-up (2020, 2024)
Denmark	10	1964	2024	Champions (1992)
Portugal	9	1984	2024	Champions (2016)
Belgium	7	1972	2024	Runners-up (1980)
Sweden	7	1992	2020	Semi-finals (1992)
Croatia	7	1996	2024	Quarter-finals (1996, 2008)
Slovakia	6	1960	2024	Champions (1976)
Serbia (Note: Includes results of Yugoslavia and FR Yugoslavia/Serbia and Montenegro between 1960–2000.)	6	1960	2024	Runners-up (1960, 1968)
Turkey	6	1996	2024	Semi-finals (2008)
Switzerland	6	1996	2024	Quarter-finals (2020, 2024)
Romania	6	1984	2024	Quarter-finals (2000)
Hungary	5	1964	2024	Semi-finals (1964, 1972)
Poland	5	2008	2024	Quarter-finals (2016)
Greece	4	1980	2012	Champions (2004)
Ukraine	4	2012	2024	Quarter-finals (2020)
Austria	4	2008	2024	Round of 16 (2020, 2024)
Scotland	4	1992	2024	Group stage
Republic of Ireland	3	1988	2016	Round of 16 (2016)
Wales	2	2016	2020	Semi-finals (2016)
Slovenia	2	2000	2024	Round of 16 (2024)
Bulgaria	2	1996	2004	Group stage
Albania	2	2016	2024	Group stage
Iceland	1	2016	2016	Quarter-finals (2016)
Northern Ireland	1	2016	2016	Round of 16 (2016)
Georgia	1	2024	2024	Round of 16 (2024)
Norway	1	2000	2000	Group stage
Latvia	1	2004	2004	Group stage
Finland	1	2020	2020	Group stage
North Macedonia	1	2020	2020	Group stage

=== Debut of teams ===
A total of 36 different UEFA members have reached the finals. Every final tournament has seen at least one entity appearing for the first time.

Year	Debuting teams			Successor teams
Year	Teams	No.	Cum.	Successor teams
1960	Czechoslovakia, France, Soviet Union, Yugoslavia	4	4	
1964	Denmark, Hungary, Spain	3	7	
1968	England, Italy	2	9	
1972	Belgium, West Germany	2	11	
1976	Netherlands	1	12	
1980	Greece	1	13	
1984	Portugal, Romania	2	15	
1988	Republic of Ireland	1	16	
1992	Scotland, Sweden	2	18	CIS, Germany
1996	Bulgaria, Croatia, Switzerland, Turkey	4	22	Czech Republic, Russia
2000	Norway, Slovenia	2	24	FR Yugoslavia
2004	Latvia	1	25	
2008	Austria, Poland	2	27	
2012	Ukraine	1	28	
2016	Albania, Iceland, Northern Ireland, Wales	5 (Note: UEFA regards the Czech Republic and Slovakia as equal successors of Czechoslovakia, and thus neither team is considered to have debuted outright under its current incarnation. Regardless, they are separate entities and are counted accordingly, bringing the cumulative total number of participants to 33 as of 2016 (and 36 as of 2024).)	33	Slovakia
2020	Finland, North Macedonia	2	35	
2024	Georgia	1	36	Serbia

=== Overall team records ===
The system used in the European Championship up to 1992 was 2 points for a win, and 3 points for a win from 1996 onwards. In this ranking 3 points are awarded for a win, 1 for a draw and 0 for a loss. As per statistical convention in football, matches decided in extra time are counted as wins and losses, while matches decided by penalty shoot-outs are counted as draws. Teams are ranked by total points, then by goal difference, then by goals scored.

As of UEFA Euro 2024

Rank	Team	Part.	Pld	W	D	L	GF	GA	GD	Pts
1	Germany (Note: Includes results of West Germany between 1972–1988.)	14	58	30	14	14	89	59	+30	104
2	Spain	12	53	28	15	10	83	46	+37	99
3	Italy	11	49	22	19	8	55	36	+19	85
4	France	11	49	23	15	11	73	53	+20	84
5	Netherlands	11	45	23	9	13	75	48	+27	78
6	Portugal	9	44	21	12	11	61	41	+20	75
7	England	11	45	18	16	11	59	43	+16	70
8	Czech Republic (Note: Includes results of Czechoslovakia between 1960–1980.)	11	40	15	8	17	51	52	−1	53
9	Russia (Note: Includes results of Soviet Union and CIS between 1960–1992.)	12	36	13	7	16	40	52	−12	46
10	Belgium	7	26	12	3	11	33	30	+3	39
11	Denmark	10	37	10	9	18	44	54	−10	39
12	Croatia	7	25	9	8	8	33	34	−1	35
13	Sweden	7	24	7	7	10	30	28	+2	28
14	Switzerland	6	23	5	11	7	24	28	−4	26
15	Turkey	6	23	7	2	14	22	38	−16	23
16	Slovakia	6	19	6	5	8	21	28	−7	23
17	Greece	4	16	5	3	8	14	20	−6	18
18	Wales	2	10	5	1	4	13	12	+1	16
19	Austria	4	14	4	2	8	14	18	−4	14
20	Poland	5	17	2	8	7	14	21	−7	14
21	Hungary	5	14	3	4	7	16	25	−9	13
22	Ukraine	4	14	4	1	9	10	23	−13	13
23	Serbia (Note: Includes results of Yugoslavia and FR Yugoslavia/Serbia and Montenegro between 1960–2000.)	6	17	3	4	10	23	41	−18	13
24	Romania	6	20	2	6	12	14	27	−13	12
25	Scotland	4	12	2	3	7	7	17	−10	9
26	Iceland	1	5	2	2	1	8	9	−1	8
27	Republic of Ireland	3	10	2	2	6	6	17	−11	8
28	Slovenia	2	7	0	6	1	6	7	−1	6
29	Norway	1	3	1	1	1	1	1	0	4
30	Georgia	1	4	1	1	2	5	8	−3	4
31	Albania	2	6	1	1	4	4	8	−4	4
32	Bulgaria	2	6	1	1	4	4	13	−9	4
33	Northern Ireland	1	4	1	0	3	2	3	−1	3
34	Finland	1	3	1	0	2	1	3	−2	3
35	Latvia	1	3	0	1	2	1	5	−4	1
36	North Macedonia	1	3	0	0	3	2	8	−6	0

Notes

Former countries

Team	Part.	Pld	W	D	L	GF	GA	GD
Czechoslovakia (1960–1980)	3	8	3	3	2	12	10	+2
Yugoslavia (1960–1984)	4	10	2	1	7	14	26	−12
Soviet Union (1960–1988)	5	13	7	2	4	17	12	+5
West Germany (1972–1988)	5	15	9	4	2	25	13	+12
CIS (1992)	1	3	0	2	1	1	4	−3
FR Yugoslavia/Serbia and Montenegro (2000)	1	4	1	1	2	8	13	−5

=== Medal table ===
The third place play-off has been discontinued since 1984, so both losing semi-finalists have been considered bronze medalists from that point onward.

Rank	Team	Gold	Silver	Bronze	Total
1	Spain	4	1	1	6
2	West Germany Germany	3	3	3	9
3	Italy	2	2	1	5
4	France	2	1	2	5
5	Soviet Union Russia	1	3	1	5
6	Czechoslovakia (Note: Czechoslovakia's results are counted for both the Czech Republic and Slovakia.) Czech Republic	1	1	3	5
6	Portugal	1	1	3	5
8	Netherlands	1	0	5	6
9	Czechoslovakia Slovakia	1	0	2	3
9	Denmark	1	0	2	3
11	Greece	1	0	0	1
12	England	0	2	2	4
13	Yugoslavia	0	2	0	2
14	Belgium	0	1	1	2
15	Hungary	0	0	1	1
15	Sweden	0	0	1	1
15	Turkey	0	0	1	1
15	Wales	0	0	1	1
Totals (18 entries)		18	17	30	65

=== Comprehensive team results by tournament ===
Legend

- 1st – Champions
- 2nd – Runners-up
- 3rd – Third place
- 4th – Fourth place
- SF – Semi-finalists
- QF – Quarter-finalists
- R16 – Round of 16
- GS – Group stage
- Q – Qualified for upcoming tournament
- • – Did not qualify
- •× – Disqualified
- × – Did not enter / Withdrew / Banned
- – Hosts

For each tournament, the number of teams in each finals tournament (in brackets) is shown.

Team (36)	(France) 1960	(Spain) 1964	(Italy) 1968	(Belgium) 1972	(Socialist Federal Republic of Yugoslavia) 1976	(Italy) 1980	(France) 1984	(West Germany) 1988	(Sweden) 1992	(England) 1996	(Belgium) (Netherlands) 2000	(Portugal) 2004	(Austria) (Switzerland) 2008	(Poland) (Ukraine) 2012	(France) 2016	(Europe) 2020	(Germany) 2024	(United Kingdom) (Republic of Ireland) 2028	(Italy) (Turkey) 2032	Times qualified
Team (36)	(4)					(8)				(16)					(24)					Times qualified
Germany	×	×	•	1st	2nd	1st	GS	SF	2nd	1st	GS	GS	2nd	SF	SF	R16	QF			14
Spain	•× (Note: Spain refused to travel to the Soviet Union for their qualification match, so the Soviet Union qualified by walkover.)	1st	•	•	•	GS	2nd	GS	•	QF	QF	GS	1st	1st	R16	SF	1st			12
Russia	1st	2nd	4th	2nd	•	•	•	2nd	GS	GS	•	GS	SF	GS	GS	GS	×	×		12
Italy	×	•	1st	•	•	4th	•	SF	•	GS	2nd	GS	QF	2nd	QF	1st	R16		Q	11
France	4th	•	•	•	•	•	1st	•	GS	SF	1st	QF	GS	QF	2nd	R16	SF			11
Netherlands	×	•	•	•	3rd	GS	•	1st	SF	QF	SF	SF	QF	GS	•	R16	SF			11
Czech Republic	3rd	•	•	•	1st	3rd	•	•	•	2nd	GS	SF	GS	QF	GS	QF	GS			11
England	×	•	3rd	•	•	GS	•	GS	GS	SF	GS	QF	•	QF	R16	2nd	2nd			11
Denmark	•	4th	•	•	•	•	SF	GS	1st	GS	GS	QF	•	GS	•	SF	R16			10
Portugal	•	•	•	•	•	•	SF	•	•	QF	SF	2nd	QF	SF	1st	R16	QF			9
Belgium	×	•	•	3rd	•	2nd	GS	•	•	•	GS	•	•	•	QF	QF	R16			7
Croatia	Part of Yugoslavia									QF	•	GS	QF	GS	R16	R16	GS			7
Slovakia	3rd	•	•	•	1st	3rd	•	•	•	•	•	•	•	•	R16	GS	R16			6
Sweden	×	•	•	•	•	•	•	•	SF	•	GS	QF	GS	GS	GS	R16	•			7
Turkey	•	•	•	•	•	•	•	•	•	GS	QF	•	SF	•	GS	GS	QF		Q	6
Serbia	2nd	•	2nd	•	4th	•	GS	•	•× (Note: Yugoslavia originally qualified for UEFA Euro 1992, but were later disqualified due to international sanctions. This is not counted as a final tournament Yugoslavia qualified for.)	×	QF	•	•	•	•	•	GS			6
Switzerland	×	•	•	•	•	•	•	•	•	GS	•	GS	GS	•	R16	QF	QF			6
Romania	•	•	•	•	•	•	GS	•	•	GS	QF	•	GS	•	GS	•	R16			6
Hungary	•	3rd	•	4th	•	•	•	•	•	•	•	•	•	•	R16	GS	GS			5
Poland	•	•	•	•	•	•	•	•	•	•	•	•	GS	GS	QF	GS	GS			5
Greece	•	× (Note: Greece entered the 1964 competition but later withdrew after refusing to play Albania. This is not counted as a qualification tournament Greece participated in.)	•	•	•	GS	•	•	•	•	•	1st	GS	QF	•	•	•			4
Austria	•	•	•	•	•	•	•	•	•	•	•	•	GS	•	GS	R16	R16			4
Ukraine	Part of Soviet Union									•	•	•	•	GS	GS	QF	GS			4
Scotland	×	×	•	•	•	•	•	•	GS	GS	•	•	•	•	•	GS	GS			4
Republic of Ireland	•	•	•	•	•	•	•	GS	•	•	•	•	•	GS	R16	•	•			3
Wales	×	•	•	•	•	•	•	•	•	•	•	•	•	•	SF	R16	•			2
Slovenia	Part of Yugoslavia									•	GS	•	•	•	•	•	R16			2
Albania	×	•	•	•	×	×	•	•	•	•	•	•	•	•	GS	•	GS			2
Bulgaria	•	•	•	•	•	•	•	•	•	GS	•	GS	•	•	•	•	•			2
Iceland	×	•	×	×	•	•	•	•	•	•	•	•	•	•	QF	•	•			1
Georgia	Part of Soviet Union									•	•	•	•	•	•	•	R16			1
Northern Ireland	×	•	•	•	•	•	•	•	•	•	•	•	•	•	R16	•	•			1
Finland	×	×	•	•	•	•	•	•	•	•	•	•	•	•	•	GS	•			1
North Macedonia	Part of Yugoslavia									•	•	•	•	•	•	GS	•			1
Latvia	Part of Soviet Union									•	•	GS	•	•	•	•	•			1
Norway	•	•	•	•	•	•	•	•	•	•	GS	•	•	•	•	•	•			1
Team (36)	(France) 1960	(Spain) 1964	(Italy) 1968	(Belgium) 1972	(Socialist Federal Republic of Yugoslavia) 1976	(Italy) 1980	(France) 1984	(West Germany) 1988	(Sweden) 1992	(England) 1996	(Belgium) (Netherlands) 2000	(Portugal) 2004	(Austria) (Switzerland) 2008	(Poland) (Ukraine) 2012	(France) 2016	(Europe) 2020	(Germany) 2024	(United Kingdom) (Republic of Ireland) 2028	(Italy) (Turkey) 2032	Times qualified
Team (36)	(4)					(8)				(16)					(24)					Times qualified

=== Hosts ===
From 1960 to 1976 the host was decided between one of the four semi-finalists. Since 1980 the hosts have automatically qualified, except in 2020 when every country had to qualify through qualification. Germany has hosted the finals in 2024.

Times	Nation	Year(s)
4	Italy	1968, 1980, 2020 (Note: Co-hosted the tournament.), 2032
3	England	1996, 2020, 2028
3	France	1960, 1984, 2016
3	Germany (Note: As West Germany in 1988.)	1988, 2020, 2024
2	Belgium	1972, 2000
2	Netherlands	2000, 2020
2	Spain	1964, 2020
2	Scotland	2020, 2028
1	Austria	2008
1	Azerbaijan	2020
1	Denmark	2020
1	Hungary	2020
1	Poland	2012
1	Portugal	2004
1	Republic of Ireland	2028
1	Romania	2020
1	Russia	2020
1	Serbia (Note: As Yugoslavia.)	1976
1	Sweden	1992
1	Switzerland	2008
1	Turkey	2032
1	Ukraine	2012
1	Wales	2028

Results of host nations
Year	Host nation(s)	Finish
1960	France	Fourth place
1964	Spain	Champions
1968	Italy	Champions
1972	Belgium	Third place
1976	Yugoslavia	Fourth place
1980	Italy	Fourth place
1984	France	Champions
1988	West Germany	Semi-finals
1992	Sweden	Semi-finals
1996	England	Semi-finals
2000	Belgium	Group stage
2000	Netherlands	Semi-finals
2004	Portugal	Runners-up
2008	Austria	Group stage
2008	Switzerland	Group stage
2012	Poland	Group stage
2012	Ukraine	Group stage
2016	France	Runners-up
2020	Azerbaijan	Did not qualify
2020	Denmark	Semi-finals
2020	England	Runners-up
2020	Germany	Round of 16
2020	Hungary	Group stage
2020	Italy	Champions
2020	Netherlands	Round of 16
2020	Romania	Did not qualify
2020	Russia	Group stage
2020	Scotland	Group stage
2020	Spain	Semi-finals
2024	Germany	Quarter-finals
2028	England	
2028	Republic of Ireland	
2028	Scotland	
2028	Wales	
2032	Italy	
2032	Turkey	

=== Results of defending finalists ===
Year	Defending champions	Finish	Defending runners-up	Finish
1964	Soviet Union	Runners-up	Yugoslavia	Did not qualify
1968	Spain	Did not qualify	Soviet Union	Fourth place
1972	Italy	Did not qualify	Yugoslavia	Did not qualify
1976	West Germany	Runners-up	Soviet Union	Did not qualify
1980	Czechoslovakia	Third place	West Germany	Champions
1984	West Germany	Group stage	Belgium	Group stage
1988	France	Did not qualify	Spain	Group stage
1992	Netherlands	Semi-finals	CIS (Soviet Union)	Group stage
1996	Denmark	Group stage	Germany	Champions
2000	Germany	Group stage	Czech Republic	Group stage
2004	France	Quarter-finals	Italy	Group stage
2008	Greece	Group stage	Portugal	Quarter-finals
2012	Spain	Champions	Germany	Semi-finals
2016	Spain	Round of 16	Italy	Quarter-finals
2020	Portugal	Round of 16	France	Round of 16
2024	Italy	Round of 16	England	Runners-up
2028	Spain		England	

=== Active consecutive participations ===
This is a list of active consecutive participations of national teams in the UEFA European Championships.

As of qualification for UEFA Euro 2024.

Team	Managed to qualify since	Consecutive participations
Germany	1972	14 (Note: Includes five appearances as West Germany, alongside reunited Germany.)
France	1992	9
Czech Republic	1996	8
Italy	1996	8
Portugal	1996	8
Spain	1996	8
Croatia	2004	6
Poland	2008	5
England	2012	4
Ukraine	2012	4
Austria	2016	3
Belgium	2016	3
Hungary	2016	3
Slovakia	2016	3
Switzerland	2016	3
Turkey	2016	3
Denmark	2020	2
Netherlands	2020	2
Scotland	2020	2
Albania	2024	1
Georgia	2024	1
Romania	2024	1
Serbia	2024	1
Slovenia	2024	1

=== Droughts ===
This is a list of droughts associated with the participation of national teams in the UEFA European Championships.

==== Longest active UEFA European Championship droughts ====
Does not include teams that have not yet made their first appearance or teams that no longer exist.

As of qualification for UEFA Euro 2028.

Team	Last appearance	Euro missed
Norway	2000	6
Bulgaria	2004	5
Latvia	2004	5
Greece	2012	3
Iceland	2016	2
Northern Ireland	2016	2
Republic of Ireland	2016	2
Russia	2020	2
Finland	2020	1
North Macedonia	2020	1
Sweden	2020	1
Wales	2020	1

==== Longest UEFA European Championship droughts overall ====
Only includes droughts begun after a team's first appearance and until the team ceased to exist.

As of qualification for UEFA Euro 2024.

Team	Prev. appearance	Next appearance	Euro missed
Hungary	1972	2016	10
Slovakia (Note: FIFA and UEFA regard both Czech Republic and Slovakia as the same entity which competed in 1960, 1976, and 1980 as Czechoslovakia.)	1980	2016	8
Norway	2000	active	6
France	1960	1984	5
Greece	1980	2004	5
Republic of Ireland	1988	2012	5
Scotland	1996	2020	5
Serbia (Note: FIFA and UEFA regard Serbia as the same entity which competed in 1960, 1968, 1976, and 1984 as Yugoslavia and 2000 as FR Yugoslavia/Serbia and Montenegro.)	2000	2024	5
Slovenia	2000	2024	5
Bulgaria	2004	active	5
Latvia	2004	active	5
Denmark	1964	1984	4
Czech Republic	1960	1976	3
Czech Republic	1980	1996	3
Spain	1964	1980	3
Russia (Note: FIFA and UEFA regard Russia as the same entity which competed in 1960, 1964, 1968, 1972, and 1988 as the Soviet Union and 1992 as the CIS.)	1972	1988	3
Belgium	1984	2000	3
Belgium	2000	2016	3

=== Countries that have never qualified ===
The following teams are current or former UEFA members which have never qualified for the European Championship. Of these, Bosnia and Herzegovina (2014, 2026) and Israel (1970) are the only teams to qualify for the FIFA World Cup, though Israel did so as an Asian Football Confederation (AFC) member. Saarland didn't exist by 1960 when the European Championship was introduced and East Germany, that qualified to the FIFA World Cup in 1974, never qualified for the European Championship until it ceased to exist in 1990.

Legend

- • – Did not qualify
- × – Did not enter / Withdrew / Banned
- – Co-host of the final tournament

For each tournament, the number of teams in each finals tournament (in brackets) are shown.

Team (20)	1960	1964	1968	1972	1976	1980	1984	1988	1992	1996	2000	2004	2008	2012	2016	2020	2024	2028	2032	Attempts
Team (20)	(4)					(8)				(16)					(24)					Attempts
Andorra	Not a UEFA member										•	•	•	•	•	•	•			7
Armenia	Part of Soviet Union									•	•	•	•	•	•	•	•			8
Azerbaijan	Part of Soviet Union									•	•	•	•	•	•	•	•			8
Belarus	Part of Soviet Union									•	•	•	•	•	•	•	•			8
Bosnia and Herzegovina	Part of Yugoslavia									(Note: Not a UEFA member)	•	•	•	•	•	•	•			7
Cyprus		×	•	•	•	•	•	•	•	•	•	•	•	•	•	•	•			15
East Germany (Note: East Germany played in eight qualification competitions before the reunification of Germany in 1990.)	•	•	•	•	•	•	•	•	× (Note: East Germany initially entered the qualifying competition, but they later withdrew after being reunified with West Germany, with the reunited nation of Germany therefore entering.)	Part of Germany										8
Estonia	Part of Soviet Union									•	•	•	•	•	•	•	•			8
Faroe Islands	Not a UEFA member								•	•	•	•	•	•	•	•	•			9
Gibraltar	Not a UEFA member														•	•	•			3
Israel	Part of AFC					Not a UEFA member				•	•	•	•	•	•	•	•			8
Kazakhstan	Part of Soviet Union									Part of AFC			•	•	•	•	•			5
Kosovo	Part of Yugoslavia									(Note: Part of FR Yugoslavia/Serbia and Montenegro)						•	•			2
Liechtenstein	Not a UEFA member					×	×	×	×	•	•	•	•	•	•	•	•			8
Lithuania	Part of Soviet Union									•	•	•	•	•	•	•	•			8
Luxembourg	×	•	•	•	•	•	•	•	•	•	•	•	•	•	•	•	•			16
Malta		•	×	•	•	•	•	•	•	•	•	•	•	•	•	•	•			15
Moldova	Part of Soviet Union									•	•	•	•	•	•	•	•			8
Montenegro	Part of Yugoslavia													•	•	•	•			4
San Marino	Not a UEFA member								•	•	•	•	•	•	•	•	•			9

=== General statistics by tournament ===
Year	Hosts	Champions	Winning coach	Top scorer(s) (goals)	Player of the Tournament
1960	France	Soviet Union	(Soviet Union) Gavriil Kachalin	(France) François Heutte (2) (Soviet Union) Valentin Ivanov (2) (Soviet Union) Viktor Ponedelnik (2) (Socialist Federal Republic of Yugoslavia) Milan Galić (2) (Socialist Federal Republic of Yugoslavia) Dražan Jerković (2)	—N/a
1964	Spain	Spain	(Spain) José Villalonga	(Hungary) Ferenc Bene (2) (Hungary) Dezső Novák (2) (Spain) Chus Pereda (2)	—N/a
1968	Italy	Italy	(Italy) Ferruccio Valcareggi	(Socialist Federal Republic of Yugoslavia) Dragan Džajić (2)	—N/a
1972	Belgium	West Germany	(West Germany) Helmut Schön	(West Germany) Gerd Müller (4)	—N/a
1976	Yugoslavia	Czechoslovakia	(Czechoslovakia) Václav Ježek	(West Germany) Dieter Müller (3)	—N/a
1980	Italy	West Germany	(West Germany) Jupp Derwall	(West Germany) Klaus Allofs (3)	—N/a
1984	France	France	(France) Michel Hidalgo	(France) Michel Platini (9)	(France) Michel Platini
1988	West Germany	Netherlands	(Netherlands) Rinus Michels	(Netherlands) Marco van Basten (5)	(Netherlands) Marco van Basten
1992	Sweden	Denmark	(Denmark) Richard Møller Nielsen	(Denmark) Henrik Larsen (3) (Germany) Karl-Heinz Riedle (3) (Netherlands) Dennis Bergkamp (3) (Sweden) Tomas Brolin (3)	(Denmark) Peter Schmeichel
1996	England	Germany	(Germany) Berti Vogts	(England) Alan Shearer (5)	(Germany) Matthias Sammer
2000	Belgium; Netherlands	France	(France) Roger Lemerre	(Netherlands) Patrick Kluivert (5) (Federal Republic of Yugoslavia) Savo Milošević (5)	(France) Zinedine Zidane
2004	Portugal	Greece	(Germany) Otto Rehhagel	(Czech Republic) Milan Baroš (5)	(Greece) Theodoros Zagorakis
2008	Austria; Switzerland	Spain	(Spain) Luis Aragonés	(Spain) David Villa (4)	(Spain) Xavi
2012	Poland; Ukraine	Spain	(Spain) Vicente del Bosque	(Croatia) Mario Mandžukić (3) (Germany) Mario Gómez (3) (Italy) Mario Balotelli (3) (Portugal) Cristiano Ronaldo (3) (Russia) Alan Dzagoev (3) (Spain) Fernando Torres (3)	(Spain) Andrés Iniesta
2016	France	Portugal	(Portugal) Fernando Santos	(France) Antoine Griezmann (6)	(France) Antoine Griezmann
2020	Europe (Note: Pan–European edition hosted by 11 countries: Azerbaijan, Denmark, England, Germany, Hungary, Italy, Netherlands, Romania, Russia, Scotland and Spain.)	Italy	(Italy) Roberto Mancini	(Czech Republic) Patrik Schick (5) (Portugal) Cristiano Ronaldo (5)	(Italy) Gianluigi Donnarumma
2024	Germany	Spain	(Spain) Luis de la Fuente	(England) Harry Kane (3) (Georgia (country)) Georges Mikautadze (3) (Germany) Jamal Musiala (3) (Netherlands) Cody Gakpo (3) (Slovakia) Ivan Schranz (3) (Spain) Dani Olmo (3)	(Spain) Rodri
2028	England; Republic of Ireland; Scotland; Wales	To be determined			
2032	Italy; Turkey	To be determined			

Note: Matthias Sammer was the first player to officially win the MVP of the tournament.

=== Goalscoring ===
Most goals scored in a tournament
142 goals, 2020
Fewest goals scored in a tournament
7 goals, 1968
Fewest goals scored in a tournament (since 1980)
27 goals, 1980
Most goals per match in a tournament
4.75 goals per match, 1976
Most goals per match in a tournament (since 1980)
2.78 goals per match, 2020
Fewest goals per match in a tournament
1.4 goals per match, 1968
Fewest goals per match in a tournament (since 1980)
1.93 goals per match, 1980
Most scorers in a tournament
85, 2024
Most players scoring at least two goals in a tournament
30, 2020
Most players scoring at least three goals in a tournament
13, 2020
Most players scoring at least four goals in a tournament
6, 2020
Most players scoring at least five goals in a tournament
2, 2000, 2020

== Teams ==
=== All-time ===
Most championships
4, Spain (1964, 2008, 2012, 2024)
Most finishes in the top two
6, West Germany/Germany (1972, 1976, 1980, 1992, 1996, 2008)
Most finishes in the top four
9, West Germany/Germany (1972, 1976, 1980, 1988, 1992, 1996, 2008, 2012, 2016)
Most finishes in the top eight
11, West Germany/Germany (1972, 1976, 1980, 1984, 1988, 1992, 1996, 2008, 2012, 2016, 2024)
Most European Championship Finals appearances
14, West Germany/Germany (every tournament since 1972)
For a detailed list, see Ranking of teams by number of appearances
Most second-place finishes
3, West Germany/Germany (1976, 1992, 2008), Soviet Union (1964, 1972, 1988)
Most third/fourth-place finishes
5, Netherlands (1976, 1992, 2000, 2004, 2024)
Most fifth to eighth-place finishes
5, England (1980, 1988, 1992, 2004, 2012)

=== Consecutive ===
Most consecutive championships
2, Spain (2008–2012)
Most consecutive finals lost
2, England (2020–2024)
Most consecutive finishes in the top two
3, West Germany (1972–1980)
Most consecutive finishes in the top four
4, Soviet Union (1960–1972)
Most consecutive finishes in the top eight
7, West Germany/Germany (1972–1996)
Most consecutive finals tournaments
14, West Germany/Germany (1972–2024)

=== Gaps ===
Longest gap between successive titles
53 years, Italy (1968–2021)
Longest gap between successive appearances in the top two
32 years, Italy (1968–2000)
Longest gap between successive appearances in the top four
29 years, Denmark (1992–2021)
Longest gap between successive appearances in the top eight
32 years, Belgium (1984–2016)
Longest gap between successive appearances in the Finals
44 years, Hungary (1972–2016)

=== Host team ===
Best finish by host team
Champions, Spain (1964), Italy (1968, 2020), France (1984)
Worst finish by host team
Did not qualify, Azerbaijan (2020), Romania (2020) (Note: Co-hosts of Euro 2020 participated in qualifiers on general grounds, so Azerbaijan, Republic of Ireland, and Romania failed to qualify. In April 2021, Republic of Ireland was removed as a tournament host, with their group stage matches reallocated to Russia, who were already hosts.)

=== Debuting teams ===
Best finish by a debuting team
Champions, Soviet Union (1960), Spain (1964), Italy (1968), West Germany (1972)
Best finish by a debuting team (after 1976)
Semi-finals, Portugal (1984), Sweden (1992), Wales (2016)

==== Top scoring teams by tournament ====
- 1960: Yugoslavia, 6 goals
- 1964: Hungary, Soviet Union & **Spain**, 4 goals each
- 1968: **Italy**, 3 goals
- 1972: **West Germany**, 5 goals
- 1976: West Germany, 6 goals
- 1980: **West Germany**, 6 goals
- 1984: **France**, 14 goals
- 1988: **Netherlands**, 8 goals
- 1992: Germany, 7 goals
- 1996: **Germany**, 10 goals
- 2000: **France** & Netherlands, 13 goals each
- 2004: Czech Republic & England, 10 goals each
- 2008: **Spain**, 12 goals
- 2012: **Spain**, 12 goals
- 2016: France, 13 goals
- 2020: **Italy** & Spain, 13 goals each
- 2024: **Spain**, 15 goals

Teams listed in bold won the tournament.

=== Tournament progression ===
==== All time ====
Progressed from the group stage the most times
9, West Germany/Germany (1980, 1988, 1992, 1996, 2008, 2012, 2016, 2020, 2024), Portugal (1984, 1996, 2000, 2004, 2008, 2012, 2016, 2020, 2024)
Eliminated in the group stage the most times
6, CIS/Russia (1992, 1996, 2004, 2012, 2016, 2020)
Most appearances, always progressed from the group stage
9, Portugal (1984, 1996, 2000, 2004, 2008, 2012, 2016, 2020, 2024)
Most appearances, never progressed from the group stage
4, Scotland (1992, 1996, 2020, 2024)

==== Consecutive ====
Most consecutive progressions from the group stage
9, Portugal (1984, 1996, 2000, 2004, 2008, 2012, 2016, 2020, 2024)
Most consecutive eliminations from the group stage
4, Scotland (1992, 1996, 2020, 2024)

=== Matches played/goals scored ===
==== All-time ====
Most matches played
58, West Germany/Germany
Most wins
30, West Germany/Germany
Most draws
19, Italy
Most losses
18, Denmark
Most matches played without a win
7, Slovenia
Most matches played without a draw
4, Northern Ireland
Most matches played before first win
8, Romania, Switzerland
Highest winning record
52.8%, Spain (28 wins in 53 matches)
Highest losing record
100%, North Macedonia (3 losses in 3 matches)
Lowest losing record
14.3%, Slovenia (1 loss in 7 matches)
Most goals scored
89, West Germany/Germany
Most goals conceded
59, West Germany/Germany
Fewest goals scored
1, Finland, Latvia, Norway
Fewest goals conceded
1, Norway
Most matches played always conceding a goal
5, Iceland
Highest average of goals scored per match
1.67, Netherlands (75 goals in 45 matches)
Lowest average of goals scored per match
0.33, Finland (1 goal in 3 matches), Latvia (1 goal in 3 matches), Norway (1 goal in 3 matches)
Highest average of goals conceded per match
2.67, North Macedonia (8 goals in 3 matches)
Lowest average of goals conceded per match
0.33, Norway (1 goal in 3 matches)
Best goal difference
+37, Spain
Worst goal difference
–18, FR Yugoslavia/Serbia and Montenegro/Serbia
Best average goal difference per match
+0.70, Spain
Worst average goal difference per match
–2.00, North Macedonia
Most meetings between two teams
8 times, Italy vs Spain (1980, 1988, 2008, 2012 (twice), 2016, 2020, 2024)
Most meetings between two teams, final match
2 times, Czechoslovakia/Czech Republic vs West Germany/Germany (1976, 1996)
Most tournaments unbeaten
6, Spain (1964, 1996, 2008, 2012, 2020, 2024)
Most tournaments eliminated without having lost a match
3, England (1996, 2012, 2020)
Most tournaments eliminated without having won a match (since 1980)
4, Poland (2008, 2012, 2020, 2024), Romania (1984, 1996, 2008, 2016)
Most matches played with tournament champion
9, Soviet Union/Russia (1964, 1968, 1972, 1988 (twice), 1996, 2004, 2008 (twice))

==== Single tournament ====
Most wins
7, Spain (2024, out of 7)
Winning all matches (since 1980)
France (1984, 5 matches), Spain (2024, 7 matches)
Fewest wins, champions (since 1980)
2, Denmark (1992, out of 5)
Fewest wins in regulation time, champions (since 1980)
1, Portugal (2016, out of 7)
Most matches not won, champions
4, Portugal (2016, out of 7)
Most wins by non-champion
5, France (2016, out of 7), England (2020, out of 7)
Most matches not won
4, Czech Republic (1996, out of 6), Netherlands (2004, out of 5), Italy (2012, out of 6), Portugal (2016, out of 7), Spain (2020, out of 6), Denmark (2024, out of 4), Slovenia (2024, out of 4), France (2024, out of 6), England (2024, out of 7)
Most draws
4, Portugal (2016, out of 7), Spain (2020, out of 6), Slovenia (2024, out of 4)
Most losses
3, Yugoslavia (1984), Denmark (1988), England (1988), Romania (1996), Turkey (1996), Denmark (2000), Bulgaria (2004), Greece (2008), Netherlands (2012), Republic of Ireland (2012), Ukraine (2016), Northern Ireland (2016), Turkey (2020), North Macedonia (2020), Ukraine (2020), Denmark (2020)
Most losses, champions
1, Netherlands (1988), Denmark (1992), France (2000), Greece (2004)
Most goals scored
15, Spain (2024)
Highest average of goals scored per match
3, Yugoslavia (1960, 6 in 2 matches), West Germany (1976, 6 in 2 matches)
Highest average of goals scored per match (since 1980)
2.8, France (1984, 14 in 5 matches)
Most goals scored, group stage (since 1980)
9, France (1984), Netherlands (2008)
Fewest goals scored
0, Soviet Union (1968), Turkey (1996), Denmark (2000), Ukraine (2016)
Fewest goals conceded (since 1980)
1, Italy (1980), Norway (2000), Spain (2012)
Lowest average of goals conceded per match
0.16, Spain (2012, 1 in 6 matches)
Most goals conceded
13, FR Yugoslavia (2000)
Most goals conceded, group stage (since 1980)
10, Yugoslavia (1984)
Highest average of goals conceded per match
3.5, Yugoslavia (1976, 7 in 2 matches)
Highest average of goals conceded per match (since 1980)
3.25, FR Yugoslavia (2000, 13 in 4 matches)
Most minutes without conceding a goal
509, Spain (2012)
Highest goal difference
+11, Spain (2012, 2024)
Lowest goal difference
−8, Yugoslavia (1984), Denmark (2000), Bulgaria (2004), Republic of Ireland (2012)
Lowest goal difference, champions
+2, Spain (1964), Italy (1968), Czechoslovakia (1976), Denmark (1992)
Highest average goal difference per match (since 1980)
+2, France (1984)
Most goals scored, champions
15, Spain (2024)
Fewest goals scored, champions (since 1980)
6, West Germany (1980), Denmark (1992)
Fewest goals scored, finalists (since 1980)
4, Belgium (1980)
Fewest goals conceded, champions (since 1980)
1, Spain (2012)
Most goals conceded, champions
7, France (2000)
Lowest average of goals scored per match, champions
1.17, Greece (2004, 7 in 6 matches)

==== Other ====
Biggest margin of victory
5 goals, on five occasions:
France 5–0 Belgium, 1984
Denmark 5–0 Yugoslavia, 1984
Netherlands 6–1 FR Yugoslavia, 2000
Sweden 5–0 Bulgaria, 2004
Slovakia 0–5 Spain, 2020
Biggest margin of victory, qualifying match
14 goals: France 14–0 Gibraltar, 18 November 2023, Group B
Most goals scored in a match, one team
6 goals: Netherlands 6–1 FR Yugoslavia, 2000
Most goals scored in a match, both teams
9 goals: France 4–5 Yugoslavia, 1960
Highest scoring draw
3–3, on four occasions:
Russia vs Czech Republic, 1996
FR Yugoslavia vs Slovenia, 2000
Hungary vs Portugal, 2016
France vs Switzerland, 2020
Largest deficit overcome in a win
2 goals, on six occasions:
Yugoslavia, 1960 (coming from 1–3 and 2–4 down to win 5–4 vs France)
West Germany, 1976 (coming from 0–2 down to win 4–2 after extra time vs Yugoslavia)
Denmark, 1984 (coming from 0–2 down to win 3–2 vs Belgium)
Portugal, 2000 (coming from 0–2 down to win 3–2 vs England)
Czech Republic, 2004 (coming from 0–2 down to win 3–2 vs Netherlands)
Turkey, 2008 (coming from 0–2 down to win 3–2 vs Czech Republic)
Largest deficit overcome in a draw
3 goals: FR Yugoslavia, 2000 (coming from 0–3 down to draw 3–3 vs Slovenia)
Most goals scored in extra time, both teams
3 goals, on two occasions:
France 3–2 Portugal, 1984
Italy 2–1 Austria, 2020
Most goals scored in a final, one team
4 goals: Spain 4–0 Italy, 2012
Most goals scored in a final, both teams
4 goals, on two occasions:
Czechoslovakia 2–2 West Germany, 1976
Spain 4–0 Italy, 2012
Fewest goals scored in a final, both teams
1 goal, on three occasions:
Portugal 0–1 Greece, 2004
Germany 0–1 Spain, 2008
Portugal 1–0 France, 2016
Biggest margin of victory in a final
4 goals: Spain 4–0 Italy, 2012
Largest deficit overcome to win in a final
1 goal, on three occasions:
Soviet Union, 1960 (coming from 0–1 down to win 2–1 after extra time vs Yugoslavia)
Germany, 1996 (coming from 0–1 down to win 2–1 after extra time vs Czech Republic)
France, 2000 (coming from 0–1 down to win 2–1 after extra time vs Italy)
Most individual goalscorers for one team, one match
5 individual goalscorers, on two occasions:
Croatia vs Spain, 2020 (Pablo Sarabia, César Azpilicueta, Ferran Torres, Álvaro Morata, Mikel Oyarzabal)
Germany vs Scotland, 2024 (Florian Wirtz, Jamal Musiala, Kai Havertz, Niclas Füllkrug, Emre Can)
Most individual goalscorers for one team, one tournament
10 goalscorers: Spain, 2024 (Álvaro Morata, Fabián Ruiz, Dani Carvajal, Ferran Torres, Rodri, Nico Williams, Dani Olmo, Mikel Merino, Lamine Yamal, Mikel Oyarzabal)
Most individual goalscorers for one team, one tournament, including own goals
11 goalscorers: Spain, 2024 (Álvaro Morata, Fabián Ruiz, Dani Carvajal, Ferran Torres, Rodri, Nico Williams, Dani Olmo, Mikel Merino, Lamine Yamal, Mikel Oyarzabal and an own goal by Italy (Riccardo Calafiori))

=== Streaks ===
Italics indicate that the streak is still active.

Most consecutive successful qualification attempts
12, West Germany/Germany (1972–2020) (Note: Excluding automatic qualification as host, as reigning champion, or by invitation.)
Most consecutive failed qualification attempts
16, Luxembourg (1964–2024)
Most consecutive wins
7, Spain, from 3–0 vs Croatia (2024) to 2–1 vs England (2024)
Most consecutive wins (qualifying and final tournaments combined)
15, Italy, from 2–0 vs Finland (23 March 2019) to 2–1 vs Belgium (2 July 2021)
Most consecutive matches without a loss
14, Spain, from 4–1 vs Russia (2008) to 3–0 vs Turkey (2016)
Most consecutive losses
6, Yugoslavia, from 0–2 vs Italy (1968) to 2–3 vs France (1984), Ukraine, from 0–2 vs France (2012) to 2–3 vs Netherlands (2020)
Most consecutive matches without a win
9, Soviet Union / CIS / Russia, from 0–2 vs Netherlands (1988) to 0–2 vs Portugal (2004)
Most consecutive draws
5, Slovenia, from 0–0 vs Norway (2000) to 0–0 (a.e.t.) vs Portugal (2024)
Most consecutive matches without a draw
17, Czech Republic, from 1–2 vs Germany (1996) to 0–1 vs Spain (2016)
Most consecutive matches scoring at least one goal
12, Spain, from 1–1 vs Poland (2020) to 2–1 vs England (2024)
Most consecutive matches scoring at least two goals
9, France, from 3–0 vs Denmark (2000) to 3–1 vs Switzerland (2004)
Most consecutive matches scoring at least three goals
3, France, from 5–0 vs Belgium (1984) to 3–2 vs Portugal (1984), Netherlands, from 3–0 vs Denmark (2000) to 6–1 vs Yugoslavia (2000)
Most consecutive matches scoring at least four goals
2, Denmark, from 4–1 vs Russia (2020) to 4–0 vs Wales (2020), Spain, from 5–0 vs Slovakia (2020) to 5–3 vs Croatia (2020)
Most consecutive matches scoring at least five goals
2, Spain, from 5–0 vs Slovakia (2020) to 5–3 vs Croatia (2020)
Most consecutive matches without scoring a goal
5, Ukraine, from 0–2 vs France (2012) to 0–1 vs Poland (2016)
Most consecutive matches without conceding a goal (clean sheets)
7, Spain, from 4–0 vs Republic of Ireland (2012) to 3–0 vs Turkey (2016)
Most consecutive minutes without conceding a goal
734, Spain (2012–2016)
Most consecutive matches without conceding a goal (including qualifying)
8, Italy, from 0–0 vs Poland (1975) to 0–0 vs Belgium (1980), England, from 6–0 vs Bulgaria (2019) to 4–0 vs Ukraine (2020)
Most consecutive minutes without conceding a goal (including qualifying)
784, Italy (1975–1980)
Most consecutive matches conceding at least one goal
13, Ukraine, from 2–1 vs Sweden (2012) to 2–1 vs Slovakia (2024)
Most consecutive matches conceding at least two goals
7, FR Yugoslavia, from 0–2 vs Italy (1968) to 3–3 vs Slovenia (2000)
Most consecutive matches conceding at least three goals
3, FR Yugoslavia, from 0–5 vs Denmark (1984) to 3–3 vs Slovenia (2000), Czech Republic, from 1–3 vs Portugal (2008) to 1–4 vs Russia (2012), Hungary, from 3–3 vs Portugal (2016) to 0–3 vs Portugal (2020)
Most matches played without consecutive losses
48, Italy, from 0–0 (a.e.t.) vs Soviet Union (1968) to 0–2 vs Switzerland (2024)
Most matches played without consecutive wins
18, Romania, from 1–1 vs Spain (1984) to 0–3 vs Netherlands (2024)
Most matches played without consecutive draws
34, Denmark, from 0–3 vs Soviet Union (1964) to 1–1 vs Slovenia (2024)

=== Penalty shoot-outs ===
Most shoot-outs, team, all-time
7, Italy
Most shoot-outs, team, tournament
2, England, 1996; France, 1996; Poland, 2016; Switzerland, 2020; Spain, 2020; Italy, 2020; Portugal, 2024
Most shoot-outs, all teams, tournament
4, 1996, 2020
Most shoot-out wins, team, all-time
4, Spain, Italy
Most wins, team, tournament
2, Italy, 2020
Most shoot-out losses, team, all-time
4, England
Most shoot-outs with 100% record (all won)
3, Czechoslovakia/Czech Republic
Most shoot-outs with 0% record (all lost)
1, Croatia, Sweden, Slovenia
Most successful kicks, shoot-out, one team
9 (out of 9), Czechoslovakia, vs Italy, 1980
Most successful kicks, shoot-out, both teams
17 (out of 18), Czechoslovakia (9) vs Italy (8), 1980
Most successful kicks, team, all-time
29 (out of 41), Italy
Most successful kicks, team, tournament
10, France, 1996 (in 2 shoot-outs)
Most successful kicks, all teams, tournament
37, 1996 (in 4 shoot-outs)
Most successful kicks, player
4, (Portugal) Cristiano Ronaldo
Most missed kicks, player
2, (Switzerland) Manuel Akanji
Most kicks taken, shoot-out, both teams
18, Czechoslovakia (9) vs Italy (9), 1980; Germany (9) vs Italy (9), 2016
Most kicks taken, team, all-time
41, Italy (in 7 shoot-outs)
Most kicks taken, team, tournament
11, France, 1996 (in 2 shoot-outs)
Most kicks taken, all teams, tournament
42, 1996 (in 4 shoot-outs)
Most kicks missed, shoot-out, one team
4, Italy, vs Germany, 2016
Most kicks missed, shoot-out, both teams
7, Germany (3) vs Italy (4), 2016
Most kicks missed, team, all-time
12, Italy (in 7 shoot-outs)
Most kicks missed, team, tournament
4, Italy, 2016 (in 1 shoot-out); Spain, 2020 (in 2 shoot-outs)
Most kicks missed, all teams, tournament
14, 2020 (in 4 shoot-outs)
Fewest successful kicks, shoot-out, one team
0, Slovenia, vs Portugal, 2024
Fewest successful kicks, shoot-out, both teams
3, Portugal (3) vs Slovenia (0), 2024
Most saves, all-time
3, Iker Casillas (Spain, 2008–2012); Gianluigi Buffon (Italy, 2008–2016); Unai Simón (Spain, 2020), Gianluigi Donnarumma (Italy, 2020), Diogo Costa (Portugal, 2024); Jordan Pickford (England, 2020–2024)
Most saves, tournament
3, Unai Simón (Spain, 2020), Gianluigi Donnarumma (Italy, 2020), Diogo Costa (Portugal, 2024)
Most saves, shoot-out
3, Diogo Costa (Portugal) vs Slovenia, 2024

=== Other ===
Most finishes in the top two without ever being champions
2, Yugoslavia/Serbia and Montenegro/Serbia (1960, 1968), England (2020, 2024)
Most finishes in the top four without ever being champions
4, England (1968, 1996, 2020, 2024)
Most finishes in the top eight without ever being champions
9, England (1968, 1980, 1988, 1992, 1996, 2004, 2012, 2020, 2024)
Most appearances in Finals without ever being champions
11, England (1968, 1980, 1988, 1992, 1996, 2000, 2004, 2012, 2016, 2020, 2024)
Least appearances in Finals with at least one title won
4, Greece (1980, 2004, 2008, 2012)
Most finishes in the top four without ever finishing in the top two
2, Hungary (1964, 1972)
Most finishes in the top eight without ever finishing in the top two
3, Turkey (2000, 2008, 2024)
Most appearances in Finals without ever finishing in the top two
7, Sweden (1992, 2000, 2004, 2008, 2012, 2016, 2020), Croatia (1996, 2004, 2008, 2012, 2016, 2020, 2024)
Most finishes in the top eight without ever finishing in the top four
2, Romania (1984, 2000), Croatia (1996, 2008), Switzerland (2020, 2024)
Most appearances in Finals without ever finishing in the top four
7, Croatia (1996, 2004, 2008, 2012, 2016, 2020, 2024)
Most points in the group stage, yet eliminated
5, Italy (2004)

== Players ==
=== Wins ===
Most championships
2, 14 players: Rainer Bonhof (West Germany, 1972 & 1980); Xabi Alonso, Iker Casillas, Cesc Fàbregas, Andrés Iniesta, Sergio Ramos, David Silva, Fernando Torres, Xavi, Raúl Albiol, Álvaro Arbeloa, Santi Cazorla, Pepe Reina (Spain, 2008 & 2012); Jesús Navas (Spain, 2012 & 2024)
Most medals
3, Rainer Bonhof (West Germany, 1972 (champions), 1976 (runners-up), 1980 (champions))
Most matches won
13, Cristiano Ronaldo (Portugal, 2004–2024)

=== Appearances ===
Most consecutive finals, player or unused substitute
3, Rainer Bonhof (West Germany, 1972–1980, only played the 1976 final)
Most tournaments in squad
6, Cristiano Ronaldo (Portugal, 2004–2024)
Most tournaments played
6, Cristiano Ronaldo (Portugal, 2004–2024)
Most matches played, final tournament
30, Cristiano Ronaldo (Portugal, 2004–2024)
Most matches played as goalkeeper, final tournament
20, Manuel Neuer (Germany, 2012–2024)
Most minutes played, final tournament
2,639, Cristiano Ronaldo (Portugal, 2004–2024)
Most appearances in a final
2, Valentin Ivanov, Viktor Ponedelnik, Lev Yashin (Soviet Union, 1960 & 1964); Franz Beckenbauer, Uli Hoeneß, Sepp Maier, Georg Schwarzenbeck, Herbert Wimmer (West Germany, 1972 & 1976); Bernard Dietz (West Germany, 1976 & 1980); Thomas Häßler, Thomas Helmer, Jürgen Klinsmann, Matthias Sammer (Germany, 1992 & 1996); Xabi Alonso, Iker Casillas, Cesc Fàbregas, Andrés Iniesta, Sergio Ramos, David Silva, Fernando Torres, Xavi (Spain, 2008 & 2012); Cristiano Ronaldo (Portugal, 2004 & 2016); Leonardo Bonucci, Giorgio Chiellini (Italy, 2012 & 2020); Harry Kane, Jordan Pickford, Declan Rice, Bukayo Saka, Luke Shaw, John Stones, Kyle Walker (England, 2020 & 2024)
Most appearances in Team of the Tournament
3, Paolo Maldini (Italy, 1988, 1996, 2000); Laurent Blanc (France, 1992–2000); Cristiano Ronaldo (Portugal, 2004, 2012, 2016); Pepe (Portugal, 2008–2016)
Youngest player to appear
16 years, 338 days, Lamine Yamal (Spain, vs Croatia, 2024)
Youngest goalkeeper to appear
21 years, 108 days, José Ángel Iribar (Spain, vs Hungary, 1964)
Youngest player to appear, knockout stage
16 years, 353 days, Lamine Yamal (Spain, vs Georgia, 2024)
Youngest player to appear in a final
17 years, 1 day, Lamine Yamal (Spain, vs England, 2024)
Youngest player to appear (qualifying match)
15 years, 300 days, Martin Ødegaard (Norway, vs Bulgaria, 2016)
Youngest captain to appear
23 years, 234 days, Dominik Szoboszlai (Hungary, vs Switzerland, 2024)
Oldest player to appear
41 years, 130 days, Pepe (Portugal, vs France, 2024)
Oldest goalkeeper to appear
40 years, 86 days, Gábor Király (Hungary, vs Belgium, 26 June 2016)
Oldest player to appear in a final
38 years, 232 days, Jens Lehmann (Germany, vs Spain, 2008)
Oldest player, winning team
38 years, 236 days, Jesús Navas, (Spain, vs England, 2024)
Oldest player to appear in a final winning team
37 years, 23 days, Arnold Mühren (Netherlands, vs Soviet Union, 1988)
Oldest captain to appear
39 years, 151 days, Cristiano Ronaldo (Portugal, vs France, 2024)
Most matches played against the same team
5, (Italy) Giorgio Chiellini, vs Spain (2008, 2012 (twice), 2016, 2020)

=== Goalscoring ===
Most goals scored in final tournaments
14, Cristiano Ronaldo (Portugal: 2 in 2004, 1 in 2008, 3 in 2012, 3 in 2016, 5 in 2020)
Most goals scored in qualifying
41, Cristiano Ronaldo (Portugal: 8 in 2008, 7 in 2012, 5 in 2016, 11 in 2020, 10 in 2024)
Most goals scored, including qualifying
55, Cristiano Ronaldo (Portugal: 2 in 2004, 9 in 2008, 10 in 2012, 8 in 2016, 16 in 2020, 10 in 2024)
Most goals scored in a single qualifying competition
14, Romelu Lukaku (Belgium, 2024 qualifying)
Most goals scored in a single final tournament
9, Michel Platini (France, 1984)
Most goals scored in a final tournament match
3, on eight occasions
Most goals scored in a qualifying match
5, on three occasions:
Malcolm Macdonald (England, 5–0 vs Cyprus, 16 April 1975)
Tibor Nyilasi (Hungary, 8–1 vs Luxembourg, 19 October 1975)
Marco van Basten (Netherlands, 8–0 vs Malta, 19 December 1990)
Most goals scored in a final
2, on three occasions:
Gerd Müller (West Germany vs Soviet Union, 1972)
Horst Hrubesch (West Germany vs Belgium, 1980)
Oliver Bierhoff (Germany vs Czech Republic, 1996)
Most matches with at least one goal
10, Cristiano Ronaldo (Portugal, 2004–2020)
Most consecutive matches with at least one goal
5, Michel Platini (France, 1984)
Most matches with at least two goals
4, Cristiano Ronaldo (Portugal, 2012–2020)
Most hat-tricks
2, Michel Platini (France, 1984) (Note: Platini's two hat-tricks were scored in consecutive matches.)
Fastest hat-trick
18 minutes, Michel Platini (France vs Yugoslavia, 1984)
Most goals scored by a substitute in a final tournament match
3, Dieter Müller (West Germany vs Yugoslavia, 1976)
Scoring in every match of the final tournament
Viktor Ponedelnik (Soviet Union, 2 goals in 2 matches, 1960); Milan Galić (Yugoslavia, 2 goals in 2 matches, 1960); Chus Pereda (Spain, 2 goals in 2 matches, 1964); Ferenc Bene (Hungary, 2 goals in 2 matches, 1964); Gerd Müller (West Germany, 4 goals in 2 matches, 1972); Dieter Müller (West Germany, 4 goals in 2 matches, 1976); Michel Platini (France, 9 goals in 5 matches, 1984) (Note: Defined as a player who played all matches for a team that reached the final or the third-place match, meaning their team played the maximum number of matches.)
Scoring in every match of one's team in a tournament
Viktor Ponedelnik (Soviet Union, 2 goals in 2 matches, 1960); Milan Galić (Yugoslavia, 2 goals in 2 matches, 1960); Chus Pereda (Spain, 2 goals in 2 matches, 1964); Ferenc Bene (Hungary, 2 goals in 2 matches, 1964); Gerd Müller (West Germany, 4 goals in 2 matches, 1972); Dieter Müller (West Germany, 4 goals in 2 matches, 1976); Michel Platini (France, 9 goals in 5 matches, 1984); Hristo Stoichkov (Bulgaria, 3 goals in 3 matches, 1996); Savo Milošević (FR Yugoslavia, 4 goals in 4 matches, 2000) (Note: Defined as a player who scored in all the matches his team has played in a tournament, whether it reached the final or not.)
Most tournaments with at least one goal
5, Cristiano Ronaldo (Portugal, 2004–2020)
Most tournaments with at least two goals
4, Cristiano Ronaldo (Portugal, 2004, 2012–2020)
Most tournaments with at least three goals
3, Cristiano Ronaldo (Portugal, 2012–2020)
Youngest goalscorer
16 years, 362 days, Lamine Yamal (Spain vs France, 2024)
Youngest goalscorer, debut
19 years, 114 days, Arda Güler (Turkey vs Georgia, 2024)
Youngest hat-trick scorer
22 years, 77 days, Dieter Müller (West Germany vs Yugoslavia, 1976)
Youngest goalscorer, final
20 years, 64 days, Pietro Anastasi (Italy vs Yugoslavia, 1968)
Youngest goalscorer, knockout stage
16 years, 362 days, Lamine Yamal (Spain vs France, 2024)
Oldest goalscorer
38 years, 289 days, Luka Modrić (Croatia vs Italy, 2024)
Oldest goalscorer, debut
38 years, 257 days, Ivica Vastić (Austria vs Poland, 2008)
Oldest hat-trick scorer
28 years, 364 days, Michel Platini (France vs Yugoslavia, 1984)
Oldest goalscorer, final
34 years, 71 days, Leonardo Bonucci (Italy vs England, 2020)
Oldest goalscorer, knockout stage
34 years, 92 days, Ladislav Pavlovič (Czechoslovakia vs France, 1960)
Most penalties scored (excluding penalty shoot-outs)
3, Cristiano Ronaldo (Portugal, 2020)
Fastest goal
23 seconds, Nedim Bajrami (Albania vs Italy, 2024)
Fastest penalty converted
118 seconds, Robbie Brady (Republic of Ireland vs France, 2016)
Fastest goal by a substitute
1 minute, Alessandro Altobelli (Italy vs Denmark, 1988); Juan Carlos Valerón (Spain vs Russia, 2004); Ondrej Duda (Slovakia vs Wales, 2016); Ferran Torres (Spain vs Slovakia, 2020)
Fastest goal, knockout stage
57 seconds, Merih Demiral (Turkey vs Austria, 2024)
Fastest goal in a final
2 minutes, Luke Shaw (England vs Italy, 2020)
Fastest goal in the second half
21 seconds, Marcel Coraș (Romania vs West Germany, 1984)
Latest goal in regulation time
90+10th minute, Kevin Csoboth (Hungary vs Scotland, 2024)
Latest goal from kickoff
120+2nd minute, Semih Şentürk (Turkey vs Croatia, 2008)
Latest winning goal from kickoff
120+1st minute, Artem Dovbyk (Ukraine vs Sweden, 2020)
Latest goal from kickoff in a final
113th minute, Viktor Ponedelnik (Soviet Union vs Yugoslavia, 1960)
Latest goal from kickoff, with no goals scored in between
119th minute, Ivan Klasnić (Croatia vs Turkey, 2008)
Latest goal from kickoff in final, with no goals scored in between
109th minute, Eder (Portugal vs France, 2016)

==== Own goals ====
As of the 2024 tournament, 30 own goals have been scored. France have been the beneficiary of five own goals, while three have been conceded by Portuguese, Slovak and Turkish players. No player has scored more than one own goal.

=== Assists ===
Notes: The criteria for an assist to be awarded may vary according to the source, the following stats is based on the assists criteria according to Opta. However, according to UEFA's own official list, Cristiano Ronaldo and Karel Poborský share first place with eight official assists each.

Most assists
7, Cristiano Ronaldo (Portugal, 2004–2024)
Most assists in a tournament
4, Ljubinko Drulović (Yugoslavia, 2000), Eden Hazard (Belgium, 2016), Aaron Ramsey (Wales, 2016), Lamine Yamal (Spain, 2024)

Most tournaments with an assist
5, Cristiano Ronaldo (Portugal, 2004–2008, 2016–2024)
Most assists provided in final matches
3, Xavi (Spain, 1 in 2008, 2 in 2012)

=== Goalkeeping ===
Most clean sheets (matches without conceding)
9, Edwin van der Sar (Netherlands, 1996–2008), Iker Casillas (Spain, 2004–2012)
Most clean sheets, one tournament
5, Iker Casillas (Spain, 2012), Jordan Pickford (England, 2020)
Most consecutive minutes without conceding a goal (finals)
519, Iker Casillas (Spain, 2012)
Most consecutive minutes without conceding a goal (qualifying)
644, Gianluigi Buffon (Italy, 2010–2011)
Most consecutive minutes without conceding a goal (including qualifying)
784 (including 8 consecutive clean sheets), Dino Zoff (Italy, 1975–1980)
Most goals conceded
21, Petr Čech (Czech Republic, 2004–2016)
Most goals conceded, one tournament
13, Ivica Kralj (FR Yugoslavia), 2000
Most goals conceded, one match
6, Ivica Kralj (FR Yugoslavia), 2000 (vs Netherlands)
Fewest goals conceded, one tournament, champions
1, of 3 matches Dino Zoff (Italy, 1968); of 6 matches Iker Casillas (Spain, 2012)
Fewest goals conceded, one tournament
1, of 3 matches Dino Zoff (Italy, 1968); of 3 matches Thomas Myhre (Norway, 2000); of 4 matches Gianluigi Buffon (Italy, 2016); of 6 matches Iker Casillas (Spain, 2012)

=== Trivia ===
- Taulant Xhaka (Albania) and Granit Xhaka (Switzerland) became the first siblings in European Championship history to play against each other, on 11 June 2016.

== Coaching ==
Most matches coached
21, Joachim Löw (Germany, 2008–2020)
Most matches won
12, Joachim Löw (Germany, 2008–2020)
Most championships
No coach has won the title on more than one occasion
Foreign championship
(Germany) Otto Rehhagel (Greece, 2004)
Most tournaments
4, Lars Lagerbäck (Sweden, 2000–2008; Iceland, 2016), Joachim Löw (Germany, 2008–2020)
Most nations coached
2, Guus Hiddink (Netherlands, 1996; Russia, 2008); Giovanni Trapattoni (Italy, 2004; Republic of Ireland, 2012); Dick Advocaat (Netherlands, 2004; Russia, 2012); Lars Lagerbäck (Sweden, 2000–2008; Iceland, 2016); Fernando Santos (Greece, 2012; Portugal, 2016–2020); Roberto Martínez (Belgium, 2020; Portugal, 2024)
Most consecutive tournaments with same team
4, Joachim Löw (Germany, 2008–2020)
Most consecutive wins
7, Luis de la Fuente (Spain, 2024)
Most consecutive matches without a loss
13, Gareth Southgate (England, 2020–2024)
Youngest coach
36 years, 327 days, Julian Nagelsmann (Germany vs Scotland, 2024)
Oldest coach
73 years, 93 days, Giovanni Trapattoni (Republic of Ireland vs Italy, 2012)
Most championship wins as player and head coach
2, Berti Vogts, West Germany/Germany (1972 as non-playing squad member; 1996 as coach)
Most appearances as player and head coach
30, Didier Deschamps, France (1992, 1996, 2000 as player; 2016, 2020, 2024 as coach)
Final appearances as both player and head coach
2, Dino Zoff, Italy (1968 as player, 2000 as coach); Didier Deschamps, France (2000 as player, 2016 as coach)

== Refereeing ==
Most tournaments
3, Anders Frisk (Sweden, 1996–2004), Kim Milton Nielsen (Denmark, 1996–2004), Cüneyt Çakır (Turkey, 2012–2020), Björn Kuipers (Netherlands, 2012–2020), Clément Turpin (France, 2016–2024)
Most matches refereed, overall
9, Cüneyt Çakır (Turkey, 2012–2020), Björn Kuipers (Netherlands, 2012–2020)
Most matches refereed, one tournament
5, Felix Brych (Germany, 2020)

=== Discipline ===
Fastest sending off
20th minute, Antonín Barák, Czech Republic vs Turkey, 2024
Latest sending off
120+6th minute, Dani Carvajal, Spain vs Germany, 2024
Most sendings off (all-time, player)
2, Radoslav Látal (Czech Republic, 1996 and 2000)
Most sendings off (tournament)
10 (in 31 matches), 2000
Most sendings off (all-time, team)
5, Czech Republic
Most sendings off (match, both teams)
3, Czechoslovakia (1) vs Netherlands (2), 1976
Sent off in final match
Yvon Le Roux, France vs Spain, 1984
Most cards (all-time, player)
8, Giorgos Karagounis (Greece, 2004–2012) (Note: All eight were yellow cards.)
Most cautions (tournament)
205 (in 51 matches), 2016
Most cautions (match, both teams)
18, Czech Republic (7) vs Turkey (11), 2024
Most cautions (final match, both teams)
10, Portugal (6) vs France (4), 2016
Fastest penalty kick conceded
1 minute, Paul Pogba, France vs Republic of Ireland, 2016

== Attendance ==
Highest attendance in a final tournament match & highest attendance in a final
79,115, Soviet Union vs Spain, 21 June 1964, Santiago Bernabéu, Madrid, Spain, 1964
Lowest attendance in a Finals match
3,869, Hungary vs Denmark, 20 June 1964, Camp Nou, Barcelona, Spain, 1964
Highest average attendance per match
56,656, 1988
Highest total attendance (tournament)
2,681,288, 2024
Lowest average attendance per match
19,740, 1960
Lowest total attendance (tournament)
78,958, 1960

== See also ==
- UEFA European Championship awards
- European nations at the FIFA World Cup
