= UEFA European Championship awards =

UEFA trophies and awards

UEFA European Championship
- Organiser(s): UEFA
- Founded: 1958; 68 years ago
- Region: Europe
- Teams: 24 / 55
- Website: uefa.com/uefaeuro

At the end of each UEFA European Championship tournament, several awards are attributed to the players and teams which have distinguished from the rest, in different aspects of the game.

== Awards ==
There are currently five post-tournament awards, and one given during the tournament:

- the Player of the Tournament for best player, first awarded in 1996;
- the Top Scorer Award (currently commercially termed Alipay Top Scorer Award) for most prolific goal scorer; (Note: In 2021, Alipay also rolled out the digital trophy in gold, silver and bronze.)
- the Young Player of the Tournament (currently commercially termed as SOCAR Young Player of the Tournament) for best under 21 years of age at the start of the calendar year, first awarded in 2016;
- the Man of the Match Award for outstanding performance during each game of the tournament, first awarded in 1996;
- the Team of the Tournament for best combined team of players at the tournament.

== Player of the Tournament ==
The Player of the Tournament award is presented to the best player at each edition of the UEFA European Championship since 1996.

UEFA published on its website the Player of the Tournament in 1984, 1988 and 1992. The winners were Michel Platini, Marco van Basten and Peter Schmeichel, respectively. However, these winners are unofficial.

Due to Schmeichel's award in 1992 being unofficial, Gianluigi Donnarumma was the first goalkeeper to officially win the award, at UEFA Euro 2020.

Edition	Player	Ref.
1996 England	(Germany) Matthias Sammer	
2000 Belgium/Netherlands	(France) Zinedine Zidane	
2004 Portugal	(Greece) Theodoros Zagorakis	
2008 Austria/Switzerland	(Spain) Xavi	
2012 Poland/Ukraine	(Spain) Andrés Iniesta	
2016 France	(France) Antoine Griezmann	
2020 Europe (Note: 11 host countries: Azerbaijan, Denmark, England, Germany, Hungary, Italy, Netherlands, Romania, Russia, Scotland and Spain.)	(Italy) Gianluigi Donnarumma	
2024 Germany	(Spain) Rodri	

== Young Player of the Tournament ==
The Young Player of the Tournament award is presented to the best player in the tournament who is at most 22 years old. For the UEFA Euro 2016, this meant that the player had to have been born on or after 1 January 1994. The award was first given out in 2016.

Edition	Player	Age	Ref.
2016 France	(Portugal) Renato Sanches	18	
2020 Europe	(Spain) Pedri	18	
2024 Germany	(Spain) Lamine Yamal	17 (Note: Lamine Yamal started the tournament aged 16 and turned 17 the day before the final.)	

== Goal of the Tournament ==
The "Goal of the Tournament" is an honorary award selected by UEFA's technical observers. The award was first awarded at 2016.

Edition	Player	Opponent
2016 France	(Switzerland) Xherdan Shaqiri	vs Poland
2020 Europe	(Czech Republic) Patrik Schick	second goal vs Scotland
2024 Germany	(Spain) Lamine Yamal	vs France

== Top goalscorer ==
Between the years 1960 and 2008, and since 2024, the Golden Boot has been awarded to the top goalscorer(s) of each edition of the UEFA European Championship.

From 2012 to 2020, the number of assists contributed by players was used as a tie-breaker if more than one player scored the same number of goals, with fewest minutes played used as a further tie-breaker if required.

Edition	Golden Boot		Silver Boot		Bronze Boot	
Edition	Player(s)	Goals	Player	Goals	Player	Goals
1960 France	(Socialist Federal Republic of Yugoslavia) Milan Galić (France) François Heutte (Soviet Union) Valentin Ivanov (Socialist Federal Republic of Yugoslavia) Dražan Jerković (Soviet Union) Viktor Ponedelnik	2 goals	—N/a			
1964 Spain	(Hungary) Ferenc Bene (Hungary) Dezső Novák (Spain) Chus Pereda	2 goals	—N/a			
1968 Italy	(Socialist Federal Republic of Yugoslavia) Dragan Džajić	2 goals	—N/a			
1972 Belgium	(West Germany) Gerd Müller	4 goals	—N/a			
1976 Yugoslavia	(West Germany) Dieter Müller	4 goals	—N/a			
1980 Italy	(West Germany) Klaus Allofs	3 goals	—N/a			
1984 France	(France) Michel Platini	9 goals	—N/a			
1988 West Germany	(Netherlands) Marco van Basten	5 goals	—N/a			
1992 Sweden	(Netherlands) Dennis Bergkamp (Sweden) Tomas Brolin (Denmark) Henrik Larsen (Germany) Karl-Heinz Riedle	3 goals	—N/a			
1996 England	(England) Alan Shearer	5 goals	—N/a			
2000 Belgium/Netherlands	(Netherlands) Patrick Kluivert (Federal Republic of Yugoslavia) Savo Milošević	5 goals	—N/a			
2004 Portugal	(Czech Republic) Milan Baroš	5 goals	—N/a			
2008 Austria/Switzerland	(Spain) David Villa	4 goals	—N/a			
2012 Poland/Ukraine	(Spain) Fernando Torres	3 goals, 1 assist (189 minutes)	(Germany) Mario Gómez	3 goals, 1 assist (282 minutes)	(Russia) Alan Dzagoev	3 goals, 0 assist (253 minutes)
2016 France	(France) Antoine Griezmann	6 goals, 2 assists (555 minutes)	(Portugal) Cristiano Ronaldo	3 goals, 3 assists (625 minutes)	(France) Olivier Giroud	3 goals, 2 assists (456 minutes)
2020 Europe	(Portugal) Cristiano Ronaldo	5 goals, 1 assist (360 minutes)	(Czech Republic) Patrik Schick	5 goals, 0 assists (404 minutes)	(France) Karim Benzema	4 goals, 0 assists (349 minutes)
2024 Germany	(Netherlands) Cody Gakpo (England) Harry Kane (Georgia (country)) Georges Mikautadze (Germany) Jamal Musiala (Spain) Dani Olmo (Slovakia) Ivan Schranz	3 goals	—N/a			

=== Statistics (1960–2024) ===
Rank	Team	Gold	Silver	Bronze	Total
1	Germany	5	1	0	6
2	Netherlands	4	0	0	4
2	Spain	4	0	0	4
2	Yugoslavia	4	0	0	4
5	France	3	0	2	5
6	Russia	2	0	1	3
7	England	2	0	0	2
7	Hungary	2	0	0	2
9	Czech Republic	1	1	0	2
9	Portugal	1	1	0	2
11	Denmark	1	0	0	1
11	Georgia	1	0	0	1
11	Slovakia	1	0	0	1
11	Sweden	1	0	0	1
Totals (14 entries)		32	3	3	38

== Man of the Match Award ==
The Man of the Match award picks the outstanding player in every game of the tournament since 1996.

Most Man of the Match awards won by tournament
Edition	Player(s)	Awards
1996 England	(Czech Republic) Karel Poborský	3
2000 Belgium / Netherlands	(France) Thierry Henry	3
2004 Portugal	(Germany) Michael Ballack (Czech Republic) Milan Baroš (England) Wayne Rooney (Netherlands) Ruud van Nistelrooy (Greece) Theodoros Zagorakis (France) Zinedine Zidane	2
2008 Austria / Switzerland	(Russia) Andrey Arshavin (Netherlands) Wesley Sneijder (Spain) David Villa	2
2012 Poland / Ukraine	(Spain) Andrés Iniesta (Italy) Andrea Pirlo	3
2016 France	(Portugal) Cristiano Ronaldo (France) Antoine Griezmann (Belgium) Eden Hazard (Spain) Andrés Iniesta (France) Dimitri Payet (Portugal) Renato Sanches (Switzerland) Granit Xhaka	2
2020 Europe	(Spain) Sergio Busquets (Italy) Federico Chiesa (Netherlands) Denzel Dumfries (England) Harry Kane (Belgium) Romelu Lukaku (Italy) Leonardo Spinazzola	2
2024 Germany	(England) Jude Bellingham (Belgium) Kevin De Bruyne (Denmark) Christian Eriksen (Netherlands) Cody Gakpo (France) N'Golo Kanté (Slovakia) Stanislav Lobotka (Spain) Nico Williams (Switzerland) Granit Xhaka	2

Total awards

As of 14 July 2024

Players in bold are still active.

Players with at least three Euro Man of the Match awards
Rank	Player	Country	Awards	Euros with awards
1	**Cristiano Ronaldo**	Portugal	6	2008, 2012 (2), 2016 (2), 2020
1	Andrés Iniesta	Spain	6	2008, 2012 (3), 2016 (2)
3	**Granit Xhaka**	Switzerland	5	2016 (2), 2020, 2024 (2)
4	**Luka Modrić**	Croatia	4	2008, 2016, 2020, 2024
4	Andrea Pirlo	Italy	4	2008, 2012 (3)
4	Zinedine Zidane	France	4	2000 (2), 2004 (2)
7	Michael Ballack	Germany	3	2004 (2), 2008
7	**Federico Chiesa**	Italy	3	2020 (2), 2024
7	**Kevin De Bruyne**	Belgium	3	2020, 2024 (2)
7	**Christian Eriksen**	Denmark	3	2020, 2024 (2)
7	Luís Figo	Portugal	3	2000 (2), 2004
7	Thierry Henry	France	3	2000 (3)
7	Zlatan Ibrahimović	Sweden	3	2004, 2008, 2012
7	Mesut Özil	Germany	3	2012 (2), 2016
7	Pepe	Portugal	3	2008, 2012, 2016
7	Karel Poborský	Czech Republic	3	1996 (3)

== Team of the Tournament ==
=== Editions ===
The Team of the Tournament is a team of the best performers at each respective UEFA European Championship edition, as chosen by the UEFA Technical Study Group since 1996. UEFA also retroactively named teams of the best 11 players from the 1960 to 1992 tournaments. The number of players in these squads has changed, from 18 players in 1996, 22 players in 2000, and 23 players from 2004 until 2012. Since 2016, a team of 11 players has been named.

Edition	Goalkeepers	Defenders	Midfielders	Forwards
France 1960 (11 player squad)	(Soviet Union) Lev Yashin	(Socialist Federal Republic of Yugoslavia) Vladimir Durković (Czechoslovakia) Ladislav Novák	(Soviet Union) Igor Netto (Czechoslovakia) Josef Masopust (Soviet Union) Valentin Ivanov (Socialist Federal Republic of Yugoslavia) Dragoslav Šekularac (Socialist Federal Republic of Yugoslavia) Bora Kostić	(Soviet Union) Slava Metreveli (Socialist Federal Republic of Yugoslavia) Milan Galić (Soviet Union) Viktor Ponedelnik
Spain 1964 (11 player squad)	(Soviet Union) Lev Yashin	(Spain) Feliciano Rivilla (Hungary) Dezső Novák (Spain) Ferran Olivella	(Spain) Ignacio Zoco (Spain) Amancio Amaro (Soviet Union) Valentin Ivanov (Spain) Chus Pereda	(Hungary) Ferenc Bene (Hungary) Flórián Albert (Spain) Luis Suárez
Italy 1968 (11 player squad)	(Italy) Dino Zoff	(Socialist Federal Republic of Yugoslavia) Mirsad Fazlagić (Italy) Giacinto Facchetti (England) Bobby Moore (Soviet Union) Albert Shesternyov	(Socialist Federal Republic of Yugoslavia) Dragan Džajić (Italy) Angelo Domenghini (Italy) Sandro Mazzola (Socialist Federal Republic of Yugoslavia) Ivica Osim	(England) Geoff Hurst (Italy) Gigi Riva
Belgium 1972 (11 player squad)	(Soviet Union) Yevhen Rudakov	(Soviet Union) Revaz Dzodzuashvili (West Germany) Paul Breitner (Soviet Union) Murtaz Khurtsilava (West Germany) Franz Beckenbauer	(West Germany) Herbert Wimmer (West Germany) Uli Hoeneß (West Germany) Günter Netzer	(West Germany) Jupp Heynckes (West Germany) Gerd Müller (Belgium) Raoul Lambert
Yugoslavia 1976 (11 player squad)	(Czechoslovakia) Ivo Viktor	(Czechoslovakia) Ján Pivarník (Netherlands) Ruud Krol (West Germany) Franz Beckenbauer (Czechoslovakia) Anton Ondruš	(Czechoslovakia) Jaroslav Pollák (West Germany) Rainer Bonhof (Socialist Federal Republic of Yugoslavia) Dragan Džajić (Czechoslovakia) Antonín Panenka	(Czechoslovakia) Zdeněk Nehoda (West Germany) Dieter Müller
Italy 1980 (11 player squad)	(Italy) Dino Zoff	(Italy) Claudio Gentile (West Germany) Karlheinz Förster (Italy) Gaetano Scirea (West Germany) Hans-Peter Briegel	(Belgium) Jan Ceulemans (Italy) Marco Tardelli (West Germany) Bernd Schuster (West Germany) Hansi Müller	(West Germany) Karl-Heinz Rummenigge (West Germany) Horst Hrubesch
France 1984 (11 player squad)	(West Germany) Harald Schumacher	(Portugal) João Pinto (West Germany) Karlheinz Förster (Denmark) Morten Olsen (West Germany) Andreas Brehme	(Portugal) Fernando Chalana (France) Jean Tigana (France) Michel Platini (France) Alain Giresse (Denmark) Frank Arnesen	(West Germany) Rudi Völler
West Germany 1988 (11 player squad)	(Netherlands) Hans van Breukelen	(Italy) Giuseppe Bergomi (Netherlands) Frank Rijkaard (Netherlands) Ronald Koeman (Italy) Paolo Maldini	(Netherlands) Ruud Gullit (Netherlands) Jan Wouters (Italy) Giuseppe Giannini (West Germany) Lothar Matthäus	(Netherlands) Marco van Basten (Italy) Gianluca Vialli
Sweden 1992 (11 player squad)	(Denmark) Peter Schmeichel	(France) Jocelyn Angloma (France) Laurent Blanc (Germany) Andreas Brehme (Germany) Jürgen Kohler	(Germany) Stefan Effenberg (Netherlands) Ruud Gullit (Germany) Thomas Häßler (Denmark) Brian Laudrup	(Netherlands) Marco van Basten (Netherlands) Dennis Bergkamp
England 1996 (18 player squad)	(England) David Seaman (Germany) Andreas Köpke	(Czech Republic) Radoslav Látal (France) Laurent Blanc (France) Marcel Desailly (Germany) Matthias Sammer (Italy) Paolo Maldini	(France) Didier Deschamps (England) Steve McManaman (England) Paul Gascoigne (Portugal) Rui Costa (Czech Republic) Karel Poborský (Germany) Dieter Eilts	(England) Alan Shearer (Bulgaria) Hristo Stoichkov (Croatia) Davor Šuker (France) Youri Djorkaeff (Czech Republic) Pavel Kuka
Belgium and Netherlands 2000 (22 player squad)	(Italy) Francesco Toldo (France) Fabien Barthez	(France) Lilian Thuram (France) Laurent Blanc (France) Marcel Desailly (Italy) Alessandro Nesta (Italy) Fabio Cannavaro (Italy) Paolo Maldini (Netherlands) Frank de Boer	(France) Patrick Vieira (France) Zinedine Zidane (Portugal) Luís Figo (Portugal) Rui Costa (Netherlands) Edgar Davids (Italy) Demetrio Albertini (Spain) Pep Guardiola	(France) Thierry Henry (Netherlands) Patrick Kluivert (Portugal) Nuno Gomes (Spain) Raúl (Italy) Francesco Totti (Federal Republic of Yugoslavia) Savo Milošević
Portugal 2004 (23 player squad)	(Czech Republic) Petr Čech (Greece) Antonios Nikopolidis	(England) Sol Campbell (England) Ashley Cole (Greece) Traianos Dellas (Sweden) Olof Mellberg (Portugal) Ricardo Carvalho (Greece) Giourkas Seitaridis (Italy) Gianluca Zambrotta	(Germany) Michael Ballack (Portugal) Luís Figo (England) Frank Lampard (Portugal) Maniche (Czech Republic) Pavel Nedvěd (Greece) Theodoros Zagorakis (France) Zinedine Zidane	(Czech Republic) Milan Baroš (Greece) Angelos Charisteas (Sweden) Henrik Larsson (Portugal) Cristiano Ronaldo (England) Wayne Rooney (Denmark) Jon Dahl Tomasson (Netherlands) Ruud van Nistelrooy
Austria and Switzerland 2008 (23 player squad)	(Italy) Gianluigi Buffon (Spain) Iker Casillas (Netherlands) Edwin van der Sar	(Portugal) José Bosingwa (Germany) Philipp Lahm (Spain) Carlos Marchena (Portugal) Pepe (Spain) Carles Puyol (Russia) Yuri Zhirkov	(Turkey) Hamit Altıntop (Croatia) Luka Modrić (Spain) Marcos Senna (Spain) Xavi (Russia) Konstantin Zyryanov (Germany) Michael Ballack (Spain) Cesc Fàbregas (Spain) Andrés Iniesta (Germany) Lukas Podolski (Netherlands) Wesley Sneijder	(Russia) Andrey Arshavin (Russia) Roman Pavlyuchenko (Spain) Fernando Torres (Spain) David Villa
Poland and Ukraine 2012 (23 player squad)	(Italy) Gianluigi Buffon (Spain) Iker Casillas (Germany) Manuel Neuer	(Spain) Gerard Piqué (Portugal) Fábio Coentrão (Germany) Philipp Lahm (Portugal) Pepe (Spain) Sergio Ramos (Spain) Jordi Alba	(Italy) Daniele De Rossi (England) Steven Gerrard (Spain) Xavi (Spain) Andrés Iniesta (Germany) Sami Khedira (Spain) Sergio Busquets (Germany) Mesut Özil (Italy) Andrea Pirlo (Spain) Xabi Alonso	(Italy) Mario Balotelli (Spain) Cesc Fàbregas (Portugal) Cristiano Ronaldo (Sweden) Zlatan Ibrahimović (Spain) David Silva
France 2016 (11 player squad)	(Portugal) Rui Patrício	(Germany) Joshua Kimmich (Germany) Jérôme Boateng (Portugal) Pepe (Portugal) Raphaël Guerreiro	(Germany) Toni Kroos (Wales) Joe Allen (France) Antoine Griezmann (Wales) Aaron Ramsey (France) Dimitri Payet	(Portugal) Cristiano Ronaldo
Europe 2020 (11 player squad)	(Italy) Gianluigi Donnarumma	(England) Kyle Walker (Italy) Leonardo Bonucci (England) Harry Maguire (Italy) Leonardo Spinazzola	(Denmark) Pierre-Emile Højbjerg (Italy) Jorginho (Spain) Pedri	(Italy) Federico Chiesa (Belgium) Romelu Lukaku (England) Raheem Sterling
Germany 2024 (11 player squad)	(France) Mike Maignan	(England) Kyle Walker (France) William Saliba (Switzerland) Manuel Akanji (Spain) Marc Cucurella	(Spain) Rodri (Spain) Dani Olmo (Spain) Fabián Ruiz	(Spain) Lamine Yamal (Germany) Jamal Musiala (Spain) Nico Williams

=== Multiple awards ===
As of 2024

The following table lists players who have been chosen in at least two Teams of the Tournament.

Players in bold are still active.

Total	Player	Years
3	(France) Laurent Blanc	1992, 1996, 2000
3	(Italy) Paolo Maldini	1988, 1996, 2000
3	(Portugal) Pepe	2008, 2012, 2016
3	(Portugal) **Cristiano Ronaldo**	2004, 2012, 2016
2	(Soviet Union) Valentin Ivanov	1960, 1964
2	(Soviet Union) Lev Yashin	1960, 1964
2	(West Germany) Franz Beckenbauer	1972, 1976
2	(Italy) Dino Zoff	1968, 1976
2	(Socialist Federal Republic of Yugoslavia) Dragan Džajić	1968, 1976
2	(West Germany) Karlheinz Förster	1980, 1984
2	(Germany) Andreas Brehme	1984, 1992
2	(Netherlands) Marco van Basten	1988, 1992
2	(Netherlands) Ruud Gullit	1988, 1992
2	(France) Marcel Desailly	1996, 2000
2	(Portugal) Rui Costa	1996, 2000
2	(France) Zinedine Zidane	2000, 2004
2	(Portugal) Luís Figo	2000, 2004
2	(Germany) Michael Ballack	2004, 2008
2	(Germany) Philipp Lahm	2008, 2012
2	(Italy) Gianluigi Buffon	2008, 2012
2	(Spain) Iker Casillas	2008, 2012
2	(Spain) Cesc Fàbregas	2008, 2012
2	(Spain) Andrés Iniesta	2008, 2012
2	(Spain) Xavi	2008, 2012
2	**(England) Kyle Walker**	2020, 2024

=== Awards by team (1960–2024) ===
Rank	Team	G	D	M	F	Total
1	Germany	3	14	16	7	40
2	Spain	2	8	16	8	34
3	Italy	6	12	8	5	31
4	France	2	8	9	2	21
5	Portugal	1	8	6	4	19
6	Netherlands	2	4	5	5	16
7	England	1	6	4	4	15
8	Czech Republic	2	4	5	3	14
9	Soviet Union	3	3	3	2	11
10	Yugoslavia	0	2	5	1	8
11	Denmark	1	1	3	1	6
12	Greece	1	2	1	1	5
13	Russia	0	1	1	2	4
14	Belgium	0	0	1	2	3
14	Hungary	0	1	0	2	3
14	Sweden	0	1	0	2	3
17	Croatia	0	0	1	1	2
17	Wales	0	0	2	0	2
19	Bulgaria	0	0	0	1	1
19	Serbia and Montenegro	0	0	0	1	1
19	Switzerland	0	1	0	0	1
19	Turkey	0	0	1	0	1
Total	22 teams	24	76	87	54	241

=== All-time Euro XI ===

In June 2016, ahead of UEFA Euro 2016 in France, UEFA published an All-time Euro XI; the winning team was chosen based on votes cast on EURO2016.com and Twitter. The application featured the 11 players who have made the greatest impact at EURO final tournaments. Nominees had to meet at least two of the following four criteria:

- Appeared in at least a semi-final
- Featured in a Team of the Tournament
- Finished a EURO tournament as top scorer
- Produced an iconic EURO moment

Goalkeeper

- (Italy) Gianluigi Buffon

Defenders

- (Italy) Paolo Maldini
- (Germany) Franz Beckenbauer
- (Spain) Carles Puyol
- (Germany) Philipp Lahm

Midfielders

- (Spain) Andrés Iniesta
- (Italy) Andrea Pirlo
- (France) Zinedine Zidane

Forwards

- (Portugal) Cristiano Ronaldo
- (France) Thierry Henry
- (Netherlands) Marco van Basten

== See also ==
- FIFA World Cup awards
- Copa América awards
- Africa Cup of Nations awards
- AFC Asian Cup awards
- CONCACAF Gold Cup awards
- OFC Men's Nations Cup awards
