= UEFA European Championship top goalscorers =

Men's UEFA European Championship top goalscorers

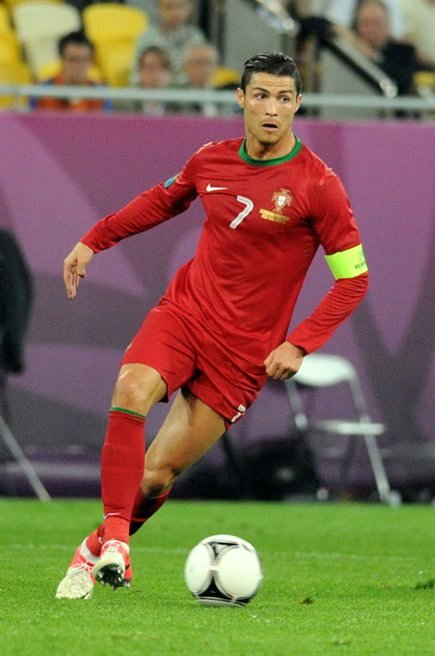
Cristiano Ronaldo is the UEFA European Championship top scorer with 14 goals.

A total of 946 goals have been scored in matches across the 17 final tournaments of the men's UEFA European Championship, not counting penalties scored during shoot-outs. Since the first goal scored by Yugoslav player Milan Galić at the 1960 European Nations' Cup, exactly 545 unique footballers have scored goals at the tournament, of whom 39 have scored four or more.

In its early days, the European Championship was contested between four teams that each only played two matches; the top scorers of the first three editions thus failed to reach more than two goals. This was bettered in 1972, when West Germany's Gerd Müller scored four goals. Four years later, this was matched by his compatriot Dieter Müller, before France's Michel Platini scored a record nine goals in just five matches during Euro 1984. Platini's record stood for more than three decades, until Cristiano Ronaldo scored his tenth European Championship goal for Portugal at the 2020 tournament. Ronaldo would improve his tally to 14 goals in 30 appearances at European Championship tournaments, which is where the record stands today. The top 39 goalscorers have represented 15 different nations, with seven players scoring for Germany or West Germany, five for France, and four for the Netherlands. In total, only six of these players scored at tournaments that featured eight or fewer teams (all editions prior to 1996).

Numbers of goalscorers
Goals	≥10	9	8	7	6	5	4	3	2	1	Total
Nos. of players	1	1	0	4	9	8	16	50	101	355	545

Platini's nine goals in 1984 is still the record for the most scored in a single European Championship. The players that came closest to this tally were Antoine Griezmann in 2016 (six goals), followed by Marco van Basten in 1988, Alan Shearer in 1996, both Savo Milošević and Patrick Kluivert in 2000, Milan Baroš in 2004, and both Ronaldo and Patrik Schick in 2020 (five goals each). Across the 17 editions of the tournament, 37 players from 16 different nations have been credited as an edition's top scorer, with Ronaldo the only one to achieve this feat twice (in 2012 and 2020). Twelve of these top scorers recorded at least four goals, while Portugal's Nuno Gomes (2000), England's Wayne Rooney, the Netherlands' Ruud van Nistelrooy (both in 2004), Belgium's Romelu Lukaku, England's Harry Kane, France's Karim Benzema and Sweden's Emil Forsberg (all in 2020) are the only players to score four or more goals in a tournament without finishing as its top scorer.

Of all the players to have featured in a UEFA European Championship tournament, only three have achieved an average of two goals per match played: Hungary's Dezső Novák and West Germany's Gerd Müller and Dieter Müller — although Novák only appeared in one match at the tournament.

== Overall top goalscorers ==
Table key
Player	Denotes player still active at international level
‡	Denotes national top scorer (or joint top scorer) at the Euro
[ ]	Denotes tournaments where the player was part of the squad, but did not play in a match
( )	Denotes tournaments where the player played in a match, but did not score a goal
Year	Denotes tournaments where the player's team won the title
T	Denotes tournaments where the player was top scorer
	Denotes the overall tournament record

Top goalscorers at UEFA Euro tournaments
Rank	Player	Team	Goals scored	Matches played	Ratio	Tournaments	Notes
1	Cristiano Ronaldo^{‡}	Portugal	14	30	0.47	2004, 2008, 2012^{T}, 2016, 2020^{T}, (2024)	list
2	Michel Platini^{‡}	France	9	5	1.80	1984^{T}	list
3	Alan Shearer^{‡}	England	7	9	0.78	(1992), 1996^{T}, 2000	list
3	Antoine Griezmann	France	7	17	0.41	2016^{T}, 2020, (2024)	list
3	Álvaro Morata^{‡}	Spain	7	17	0.41	2016, 2020, 2024	list
3	Harry Kane^{‡}	England	7	18	0.39	(2016), 2020, 2024^{T}	list
7	Patrik Schick^{‡}	Czech Republic	6	7	0.86	2020^{T}, 2024	list
7	Ruud van Nistelrooy^{‡}	Netherlands	6	8	0.75	2004, 2008	list
7	Patrick Kluivert^{‡}	Netherlands	6	9	0.67	1996, 2000^{T}, [2004]	list
7	Wayne Rooney	England	6	10	0.60	2004, 2012, 2016	list
7	Thierry Henry	France	6	11	0.55	2000, 2004, 2008	list
7	Zlatan Ibrahimović^{‡}	Sweden	6	13	0.46	2004, 2008, 2012, (2016)	list
7	Robert Lewandowski^{‡}	Poland	6	13	0.46	2012, 2016, 2020, 2024	list
7	Nuno Gomes	Portugal	6	14	0.43	2000, 2004, 2008	list
7	Romelu Lukaku^{‡}	Belgium	6	14	0.43	2016, 2020, (2024)	list
16	Savo Milošević^{‡}	FR Yugoslavia	5	4	1.25	2000^{T}	list
16	Marco van Basten	Netherlands	5	9	0.56	1988^{T}, (1992)	list
16	Milan Baroš	Czech Republic	5	10	0.50	2004^{T}, (2008), (2012)	list
16	Xherdan Shaqiri^{‡}	Switzerland	5	11	0.45	2016, 2020, 2024	list
16	Mario Gómez^{‡}	Germany	5	13	0.38	(2008), 2012^{T}, 2016	list
16	Jürgen Klinsmann^{‡}	Germany (Note: At Euro 1988, Klinsmann made four appearances and scored one goal for West Germany.)	5	13	0.38	1988, 1992, 1996	list
16	Fernando Torres	Spain	5	13	0.38	(2004), 2008, 2012^{T}	list
16	Zinedine Zidane	France	5	14	0.36	(1996), 2000, 2004	list
24	Dieter Müller	West Germany	4	2	2.00	1976^{T}	list
24	Gerd Müller	West Germany	4	2	2.00	1972^{T}	list
24	David Villa	Spain	4	4	1.00	2008^{T}	list
24	Dragan Džajić	Yugoslavia	4	5	0.80	1968^{T}, 1976	list
24	Emil Forsberg	Sweden	4	7	0.57	(2016), 2020	list
24	Roman Pavlyuchenko^{‡}	Russia	4	8	0.50	2008, 2012	list
24	Rudi Völler	West Germany (Note: At Euro 1992, Völler made one appearance for Germany.)	4	8	0.50	1984, 1988, (1992)	list
24	Angelos Charisteas^{‡}	Greece	4	9	0.44	2004, 2008	list
24	Kai Havertz	Germany	4	9	0.44	2020, 2024	list
24	Karim Benzema	France	4	10	0.40	(2008), (2012), 2020	list
24	Henrik Larsson	Sweden	4	10	0.40	2000, 2004, (2008)	list
24	Vladimír Šmicer	Czech Republic	4	11	0.36	1996, 2000, 2004	list
24	Lukas Podolski	Germany	4	12	0.33	(2004), 2008, 2012, (2016)	list
24	Dennis Bergkamp	Netherlands	4	13	0.31	1992, 1996, (2000)	list
24	Ivan Perišić^{‡}	Croatia	4	13	0.31	(2012), 2016, 2020, (2024)	list
24	Luka Modrić^{‡}	Croatia	4	16	0.25	2008, (2012), 2016, 2020, 2024	list

=== Timeline ===
Key
Goal set a new record
Goal equalled the existing record

Progressive list of footballers that have held the record for most goals scored at UEFA European Championship final tournaments
Goals	Date	Player	Team	Goal	Opponent	Score	Tournament & Stage	Previous goals	Ref.
1	6 July 1960	Milan Galić	Yugoslavia	1–0	France	5–4	1960, France; Semi-finals	N/A	
1	6 July 1960	Jean Vincent	France	1–1	Yugoslavia	4–5	1960, France; Semi-finals	N/A	
1	6 July 1960	François Heutte	France	2–1	Yugoslavia	4–5	1960, France; Semi-finals	N/A	
1	6 July 1960	Maryan Wisniewski	France	3–1	Yugoslavia	4–5	1960, France; Semi-finals	N/A	
1	6 July 1960	Ante Žanetić	Yugoslavia	2–3	France	5–4	1960, France; Semi-finals	N/A	
2	6 July 1960	François Heutte	France	4–2	Yugoslavia	4–5	1960, France; Semi-finals	1960 vs Yugoslavia	
2	6 July 1960	Dražan Jerković	Yugoslavia	5–4	France	5–4	1960, France; Semi-finals	1960 vs France	
2	6 July 1960	Valentin Ivanov	Soviet Union	2–0	Czechoslovakia	3–0	1960, France; Semi-finals	1960 vs Czechoslovakia	
2	10 July 1960	Milan Galić	Yugoslavia	1–0	Soviet Union	1–2	1960, France; Final	1960 vs France	
2	10 July 1960	Viktor Ponedelnik	Soviet Union	2–1	Yugoslavia	2–1	1960, France; Final	1960 vs Czechoslovakia	
3	17 June 1964	Viktor Ponedelnik	Soviet Union	2–0	Denmark	3–0	1964, Spain; Semi-finals	1960 vs Czechoslovakia, Yugoslavia	
3	17 June 1964	Valentin Ivanov	Soviet Union	3–0	Denmark	3–0	1964, Spain; Semi-finals	1960 vs Czechoslovakia (2)	
3	18 June 1972	Gerd Müller	West Germany	1–0	Soviet Union	3–0	1972, Belgium; Final	1972 vs Belgium (2)	
4	18 June 1972	Gerd Müller	West Germany	3–0	Soviet Union	3–0	1972, Belgium; Final	1972 vs Belgium (2)	
4	19 June 1976	Dragan Džajić	Yugoslavia	2–2	Netherlands	2–3	1976, Yugoslavia; 3rd place play-off	1968 vs England, Italy; 1976 vs West Germany	
4	20 June 1976	Dieter Müller	West Germany	1–2	Czechoslovakia	2–2^{aet}	1976, Yugoslavia; Final	1976 vs Yugoslavia (3)	
4	16 June 1984	Michel Platini	France	5–0	Belgium	5–0	1984, France; Group stage	1984 vs Denmark, Belgium (2)	
5	19 June 1984	Michel Platini	France	1–1	Yugoslavia	3–2	1984, France; Group stage	1984 vs Denmark, Belgium (2)	
6	19 June 1984	Michel Platini	France	2–1	Yugoslavia	3–2	1984, France; Group stage	1984 vs Denmark, Belgium (2)	
7	19 June 1984	Michel Platini	France	3–1	Yugoslavia	3–2	1984, France; Group stage	1984 vs Denmark, Belgium (2)	
8	23 June 1984	Michel Platini	France	3–2	Portugal	3–2	1984, France; Semi-finals	1984 vs Denmark, Belgium (2)	
9	27 June 1984	Michel Platini	France	1–0	Spain	2–0	1984, France; Final	1984 vs Denmark, Belgium (2)	
9	6 July 2016	Cristiano Ronaldo	Portugal	1–0	Wales	2–0	2016, France; Semi-finals	2004 vs Greece, Netherlands; 2008 vs Czech Republic; 2012 vs Netherlands (2), Czech Republic; 2016 vs Hungary (2)	
10	15 June 2021	Cristiano Ronaldo	Portugal	2–0	Hungary	3–0	2020, Europe; Group stage	2004 vs Greece, Netherlands; 2008 vs Czech Republic; 2012 vs Netherlands (2), Czech Republic; 2016 vs Hungary (2)	
11	15 June 2021	Cristiano Ronaldo	Portugal	3–0	Hungary	3–0	2020, Europe; Group stage	2004 vs Greece, Netherlands; 2008 vs Czech Republic; 2012 vs Netherlands (2), Czech Republic; 2016 vs Hungary (2)	
12	19 June 2021	Cristiano Ronaldo	Portugal	1–0	Germany	2–4	2020, Europe; Group stage	2004 vs Greece, Netherlands; 2008 vs Czech Republic; 2012 vs Netherlands (2), Czech Republic; 2016 vs Hungary (2)	
13	23 June 2021	Cristiano Ronaldo	Portugal	1–0	France	2–2	2020, Europe; Group stage	2004 vs Greece, Netherlands; 2008 vs Czech Republic; 2012 vs Netherlands (2), Czech Republic; 2016 vs Hungary (2)	
14	23 June 2021	Cristiano Ronaldo	Portugal	2–2	France	2–2	2020, Europe; Group stage	2004 vs Greece, Netherlands; 2008 vs Czech Republic; 2012 vs Netherlands (2), Czech Republic; 2016 vs Hungary (2)	

== Top goalscorers for each tournament ==
Since 2008, if there is more than one player with the same number of goals, the tie-breaker goes to the player who has contributed the most assists. If there is still more than one player, the tie-breaker goes to the player who has played the least amount of time. Between 1960 and 2008, the Golden Boot award went to each of the top goalscorers of the UEFA European Championship tournaments. At Euro 2020, there was a new physical and digital trophy presented to the tournament's top scorer. It was commissioned by Alipay, the Chinese company sponsoring the award. "Sculpted in the shape of the Chinese character '支' (pronounced zhi, and meaning 'payment' as well as 'support'), the barefooted player on the trophy reflects the egalitarian footballing ideal that success on the pitch comes regardless of background or status," according to UEFA.

Key
†	Denotes the record for the most goals in a single tournament

Top goalscorers at each UEFA European Championship final tournament
Edition	Player	Team	Goals scored	Matches played	Golden Boot	Other UEFA Awards
1960 France	François Heutte	France	2	2	Yes	
1960 France	Valentin Ivanov	Soviet Union	2	2	Yes	Team of the Tournament
1960 France	Viktor Ponedelnik	Soviet Union	2	2	Yes	Team of the Tournament
1960 France	Dražan Jerković	Yugoslavia	2	2	Yes	
1960 France	Milan Galić	Yugoslavia	2	2	Yes	Team of the Tournament
1964 Spain	Ferenc Bene	Hungary	2	2	Yes	Team of the Tournament
1964 Spain	Dezső Novák	Hungary	2	1	Yes	
1964 Spain	Chus Pereda	Spain	2	2	Yes	Team of the Tournament
1968 Italy	Dragan Džajić	Yugoslavia	2	3	Yes	Team of the Tournament
1972 Belgium	Gerd Müller	West Germany	4	2	Yes	Team of the Tournament
1976 Yugoslavia	Dieter Müller	West Germany	4	2	Yes	Team of the Tournament
1980 Italy	Klaus Allofs	West Germany	3	3	Yes	
1984 France	Michel Platini	France	9^{†}	5	Yes	Player of the Tournament; Team of the Tournament
1988 West Germany	Marco van Basten	Netherlands	5	5	Yes	Player of the Tournament; Team of the Tournament
1992 Sweden	Henrik Larsen	Denmark	3	4	Yes	
1992 Sweden	Karl-Heinz Riedle	Germany	3	5	Yes	
1992 Sweden	Dennis Bergkamp	Netherlands	3	4	Yes	Team of the Tournament
1992 Sweden	Tomas Brolin	Sweden	3	4	Yes	
1996 England	Alan Shearer	England	5	5	Yes	Team of the Tournament
2000 Belgium/Netherlands	Patrick Kluivert	Netherlands	5	5	Yes	Team of the Tournament
2000 Belgium/Netherlands	Savo Milošević	FR Yugoslavia	5	4	Yes	Team of the Tournament
2004 Portugal	Milan Baroš	Czech Republic	5	5	Yes	Team of the Tournament
2008 Austria/Switzerland	David Villa	Spain	4	4	Yes	Team of the Tournament
2012 Poland/Ukraine	Mario Mandžukić	Croatia	3	3	No	
2012 Poland/Ukraine	Mario Gómez	Germany	3	5	No	Silver Boot
2012 Poland/Ukraine	Mario Balotelli	Italy	3	5	No	Team of the Tournament
2012 Poland/Ukraine	Cristiano Ronaldo	Portugal	3	5	No	Team of the Tournament
2012 Poland/Ukraine	Alan Dzagoev	Russia	3	3	No	Bronze Boot
2012 Poland/Ukraine	Fernando Torres	Spain	3	5	Yes	
2016 France	Antoine Griezmann	France	6	7	Yes	Player of the Tournament; Team of the Tournament
2020 Europe	Patrik Schick	Czech Republic	5	5	No	Silver Boot
2020 Europe	Cristiano Ronaldo	Portugal	5	4	Yes	
2024 Germany	Harry Kane	England	3	7	Yes	
2024 Germany	Georges Mikautadze	Georgia	3	4	Yes	
2024 Germany	Jamal Musiala	Germany	3	5	Yes	Team of the Tournament
2024 Germany	Cody Gakpo	Netherlands	3	6	Yes	
2024 Germany	Ivan Schranz	Slovakia	3	4	Yes	
2024 Germany	Dani Olmo	Spain	3	6	Yes	Team of the Tournament

== Goalscorers in final matches ==
- **Bold** indicates winning final
- Parentheses indicates no goals scored

Player	Team	Goals scored	Finals played	Final(s)
Gerd Müller	West Germany	2	1	**1972**
Horst Hrubesch	West Germany	2	1	**1980**
Oliver Bierhoff	Germany	2	1	**1996**
Fernando Torres	Spain	2	2	**2008**, **2012**
Slava Metreveli	Soviet Union	1	1	**1960**
Milan Galić	Yugoslavia	1	1	1960
Chus Pereda	Spain	1	1	**1964**
Marcelino	Spain	1	1	**1964**
Galimzyan Khusainov	Soviet Union	1	1	1964
Gigi Riva	Italy	1	1	**1968**
Ján Švehlík	Czechoslovakia	1	1	**1976**
Karol Dobiaš	Czechoslovakia	1	1	**1976**
Dieter Müller	West Germany	1	1	1976
Bernd Hölzenbein	West Germany	1	1	1976
René Vandereycken	Belgium	1	1	1980
Michel Platini	France	1	1	**1984**
Bruno Bellone	France	1	1	**1984**
Ruud Gullit	Netherlands	1	1	**1988**
Marco van Basten	Netherlands	1	1	**1988**
John Jensen	Denmark	1	1	**1992**
Kim Vilfort	Denmark	1	1	**1992**
Patrik Berger	Czech Republic	1	1	1996
Sylvain Wiltord	France	1	1	**2000**
David Trezeguet	France	1	1	**2000**
Marco Delvecchio	Italy	1	1	2000
Angelos Charisteas	Greece	1	1	**2004**
Jordi Alba	Spain	1	1	**2012**
Juan Mata	Spain	1	1	**2012**
Eder	Portugal	1	1	**2016**
Mikel Oyarzabal	Spain	1	1	**2024**
Nico Williams	Spain	1	1	**2024**
Cole Palmer	England	1	1	2024
Viktor Ponedelnik	Soviet Union	1	2	**1960**, (1964)
Angelo Domenghini	Italy	1	2 (Note: UEFA Euro 1968 final was decided over two matches.)	**1968**
Dragan Džajić	Yugoslavia	1	2	1968
Pietro Anastasi	Italy	1	2	**1968**
Herbert Wimmer	West Germany	1	2	**1972**, (1976)
David Silva	Spain	1	2	(**2008**), **2012**
Leonardo Bonucci	Italy	1	2	(2012), **2020**
Luke Shaw	England	1	2	2020, (2024)

== See also ==
- UEFA European Championship
- List of UEFA European Championship hat-tricks
- List of UEFA European Championship own goals
- List of FIFA World Cup top goalscorers
