= List of UEFA European Championship hat-tricks =

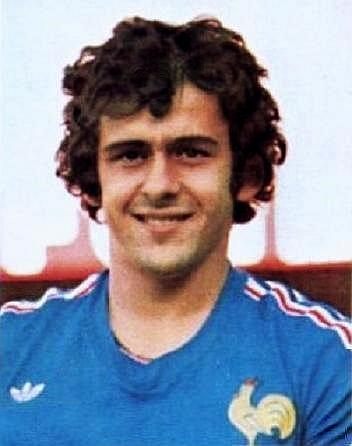
Michel Platini of France is the only player to have scored two hat-tricks in the European Championship, having scored both at UEFA Euro 1984, when his team went on to win the tournament.

This is a list of all hat-tricks scored during UEFA European Championships; that is, the occasions when a footballer has scored three or more goals in a single football European Championship match (not including qualification matches). Scoring a hat-trick in a European Championship is a relatively rare event: only eight hat-tricks have been scored in the seventeen editions of the European Championships. As UEFA is the governing body of European association football, official hat-tricks are only noted when UEFA recognises that at least three goals were scored by one player in one match.

The tournament was first held in 1960, but there were no hat-tricks in any of the first four editions. In the semi-finals of the 1976 competition, Dieter Müller scored the first hat-trick in his first international game, as West Germany came from behind to defeat Yugoslavia 4–2 after extra time. Four years later, his compatriot Klaus Allofs scored the second hat-trick, in a 3–2 group stage win over the Netherlands. The first tournament to see more than one hat-trick was in 1984, both by France captain Michel Platini, who is the only player to score more than one European Championship hat-trick; his first against Yugoslavia is the quickest hat-trick in the history of the competition, with all three goals coming in the space of 18 minutes. After Marco van Basten's three goals for the Netherlands in a 3–1 group stage win over England in 1988, there were no hat-tricks in 1992 or 1996.

At UEFA Euro 2000, there were a joint-record two hat-tricks: Sérgio Conceição scored all of the goals in Portugal's group stage victory over Germany, and Patrick Kluivert recorded three goals in the Netherlands' 6–1 win over Yugoslavia in the quarter-finals. The most recent hat-trick to be scored at the European Championship finals was by Spain's David Villa, who scored three times in a 4–1 win over Russia in the group stage of the 2008 tournament.

Every player who has scored a hat-trick in the European Championship has ended on the winning team in that match. On all but three occasions they have ended up winning the tournament. Dieter Müller's hat-trick in 1976 is the only to be scored by a substitute. No player has scored in a European Championship final, nor has any recorded more than three goals in the same game.

== Hat-tricks ==
Key
Player's team won the match
Player's team drew the match (a penalty shoot-out is recorded as a draw regardless of shootout results)
Player's team lost the match

UEFA European Championships hat-tricks
No.	Player	Time of goals	For	Result	Against	Tournament	Round	Date	Ref.
1	Dieter Müller	82', 115', 119'	West Germany	4–2 (a.e.t.)	Yugoslavia	1976, Yugoslavia	Semi-finals	17 June 1976	
2	Klaus Allofs	20', 60', 65'	West Germany	3–2	Netherlands	1980, Italy	Group stage	14 June 1980	
3	Michel Platini (1)	4', 74' (pen.), 89'	France	5–0	Belgium	1984, France	Group stage	16 June 1984	
4	Michel Platini (2)	59', 62', 77'	France	3–2	Yugoslavia	1984, France	Group stage	19 June 1984	
5	Marco van Basten	44', 71', 75'	Netherlands	3–1	England	1988, West Germany	Group stage	15 June 1988	
6	Sérgio Conceição	35', 54', 71'	Portugal	3–0	Germany	2000, Belgium/Netherlands	Group stage	20 June 2000	
7	Patrick Kluivert	24', 38', 54'	Netherlands	6–1	FR Yugoslavia	2000, Belgium/Netherlands	Quarter-finals	25 June 2000	
8	David Villa	20', 44', 75'	Spain	4–1	Russia	2008, Austria/Switzerland	Group stage	10 June 2008	

== See also ==
- UEFA European Championship
- UEFA European Championship top goalscorers
