= UEFA Euro 2016 statistics =

European football tournament statistics

The following article outlines statistics for UEFA Euro 2016, which took place in France from 10 June to 10 July 2016. Goals scored during penalty shoot-outs are not counted, and matches decided by a penalty shoot-out are considered draws.

== Goalscorers ==
There were 108 goals scored in 51 matches, for an average of 2.12 goals per match.

6 goals

- (France) Antoine Griezmann

3 goals

- (France) Olivier Giroud
- (France) Dimitri Payet
- (Portugal) Nani
- (Portugal) Cristiano Ronaldo
- (Spain) Álvaro Morata
- (Wales) Gareth Bale

2 goals

- (Belgium) Romelu Lukaku
- (Belgium) Radja Nainggolan
- (Croatia) Ivan Perišić
- (Germany) Mario Gómez
- (Hungary) Balázs Dzsudzsák
- (Iceland) Birkir Bjarnason
- (Iceland) Kolbeinn Sigþórsson
- (Italy) Graziano Pellè
- (Poland) Jakub Błaszczykowski
- (Republic of Ireland) Robbie Brady
- (Romania) Bogdan Stancu
- (Wales) Hal Robson-Kanu

1 goal

- (Albania) Armando Sadiku
- (Austria) Alessandro Schöpf
- (Belgium) Toby Alderweireld
- (Belgium) Michy Batshuayi
- (Belgium) Yannick Carrasco
- (Belgium) Eden Hazard
- (Belgium) Axel Witsel
- (Croatia) Nikola Kalinić
- (Croatia) Luka Modrić
- (Croatia) Ivan Rakitić
- (Czech Republic) Tomáš Necid
- (Czech Republic) Milan Škoda
- (England) Eric Dier
- (England) Wayne Rooney
- (England) Daniel Sturridge
- (England) Jamie Vardy
- (France) Paul Pogba
- (Germany) Jérôme Boateng
- (Germany) Julian Draxler
- (Germany) Shkodran Mustafi
- (Germany) Mesut Özil
- (Germany) Bastian Schweinsteiger
- (Hungary) Zoltán Gera
- (Hungary) Zoltán Stieber
- (Hungary) Ádám Szalai
- (Iceland) Jón Daði Böðvarsson
- (Iceland) Gylfi Sigurðsson
- (Iceland) Ragnar Sigurðsson
- (Iceland) Arnór Ingvi Traustason
- (Italy) Leonardo Bonucci
- (Italy) Giorgio Chiellini
- (Italy) Éder
- (Italy) Emanuele Giaccherini
- (Northern Ireland) Gareth McAuley
- (Northern Ireland) Niall McGinn
- (Poland) Robert Lewandowski
- (Poland) Arkadiusz Milik
- (Portugal) Eder
- (Portugal) Ricardo Quaresma
- (Portugal) Renato Sanches
- (Republic of Ireland) Wes Hoolahan
- (Russia) Vasili Berezutski
- (Russia) Denis Glushakov
- (Slovakia) Ondrej Duda
- (Slovakia) Marek Hamšík
- (Slovakia) Vladimír Weiss
- (Spain) Nolito
- (Spain) Gerard Piqué
- (Switzerland) Admir Mehmedi
- (Switzerland) Fabian Schär
- (Switzerland) Xherdan Shaqiri
- (Turkey) Ozan Tufan
- (Turkey) Burak Yılmaz
- (Wales) Aaron Ramsey
- (Wales) Neil Taylor
- (Wales) Sam Vokes
- (Wales) Ashley Williams

1 own goal

- (Iceland) Birkir Már Sævarsson (against Hungary)
- (Northern Ireland) Gareth McAuley (against Wales)
- (Republic of Ireland) Ciaran Clark (against Sweden)

Source: UEFA

== Assists ==
4 assists

- (Belgium) Eden Hazard
- (Wales) Aaron Ramsey

3 assists

- (Belgium) Kevin De Bruyne
- (Portugal) Cristiano Ronaldo

2 assists

- (France) Olivier Giroud
- (France) Antoine Griezmann
- (France) Dimitri Payet
- (Iceland) Kári Árnason
- (Poland) Kamil Grosicki

1 assist

- (Albania) Ledian Memushaj
- (Austria) David Alaba
- (Belgium) Thomas Meunier
- (Belgium) Radja Nainggolan
- (Croatia) Marcelo Brozović
- (Croatia) Nikola Kalinić
- (Croatia) Ivan Perišić
- (Czech Republic) Tomáš Rosický
- (England) Dele Alli
- (France) André-Pierre Gignac
- (France) N'Golo Kanté
- (France) Blaise Matuidi
- (France) Adil Rami
- (France) Bacary Sagna
- (Germany) Julian Draxler
- (Germany) Jonas Hector
- (Germany) Toni Kroos
- (Germany) Thomas Müller
- (Germany) Mesut Özil
- (Hungary) László Kleinheisler
- (Hungary) Nemanja Nikolić
- (Hungary) Tamás Priskin
- (Iceland) Theódór Elmar Bjarnason
- (Iceland) Jón Daði Böðvarsson
- (Iceland) Jóhann Berg Guðmundsson
- (Iceland) Gylfi Sigurðsson
- (Iceland) Ari Freyr Skúlason
- (Italy) Leonardo Bonucci
- (Italy) Antonio Candreva
- (Italy) Matteo Darmian
- (Italy) Emanuele Giaccherini
- (Italy) Simone Zaza
- (Northern Ireland) Stuart Dallas
- (Northern Ireland) Oliver Norwood
- (Poland) Jakub Błaszczykowski
- (Poland) Arkadiusz Milik
- (Portugal) André Gomes
- (Portugal) Raphaël Guerreiro
- (Portugal) João Mário
- (Portugal) João Moutinho
- (Portugal) Nani
- (Portugal) Ricardo Quaresma
- (Republic of Ireland) Séamus Coleman
- (Republic of Ireland) Wes Hoolahan
- (Russia) Oleg Shatov
- (Russia) Georgi Shchennikov
- (Slovakia) Marek Hamšík
- (Slovakia) Róbert Mak
- (Slovakia) Vladimír Weiss
- (Spain) Jordi Alba
- (Spain) Cesc Fàbregas
- (Spain) Andrés Iniesta
- (Spain) Nolito
- (Sweden) Zlatan Ibrahimović
- (Switzerland) Eren Derdiyok
- (Switzerland) Xherdan Shaqiri
- (Turkey) Emre Mor
- (Turkey) Mehmet Topal
- (Wales) Joe Allen
- (Wales) Gareth Bale
- (Wales) Chris Gunter

== Clean sheets ==
4 clean sheets

- (Germany) Manuel Neuer
- (Portugal) Rui Patrício

3 clean sheets

- (Belgium) Thibaut Courtois
- (France) Hugo Lloris
- (Italy) Gianluigi Buffon

2 clean sheets

- (Poland) Łukasz Fabiański
- (Spain) David de Gea
- (Switzerland) Yann Sommer
- (Wales) Wayne Hennessey

1 clean sheet

- (Albania) Etrit Berisha
- (Austria) Robert Almer
- (Croatia) Danijel Subašić
- (England) Joe Hart
- (Hungary) Gábor Király
- (Northern Ireland) Michael McGovern
- (Poland) Wojciech Szczęsny
- (Republic of Ireland) Darren Randolph
- (Slovakia) Matúš Kozáčik
- (Turkey) Volkan Babacan

== Awards ==
=== Golden Boot ===
Antoine Griezmann of France received the Golden Boot award as the top scorer of the tournament with six goals, the most for a player at a single tournament since countryman Michel Platini scored nine in 1984.

=== Man of the Match ===
Rank	Player	Team	Opponent	Awards
1	Cristiano Ronaldo	Portugal	vs Hungary (GM), vs Wales (SF)	2
1	Antoine Griezmann	France	vs Republic of Ireland (R16), vs Germany (SF)	2
1	Eden Hazard	Belgium	vs Sweden (GM), vs Hungary (R16)	2
1	Andrés Iniesta	Spain	vs Czech Republic (GM), vs Turkey (GM)	2
1	Dimitri Payet	France	vs Romania (GM), vs Albania (GM)	2
1	Renato Sanches	Portugal	vs Croatia (R16), vs Poland (QF)	2
1	Granit Xhaka	Switzerland	vs Albania (GM), vs Romania (GM)	2
8	Arlind Ajeti	Albania	vs Romania (GM)	1
8	Joe Allen	Wales	vs Slovakia (GM)	1
8	Kári Árnason	Iceland	vs Austria (GM)	1
8	Gareth Bale	Wales	vs Northern Ireland (R16)	1
8	Jérôme Boateng	Germany	vs Poland (GM)	1
8	Leonardo Bonucci	Italy	vs Spain (R16)	1
8	Robbie Brady	Republic of Ireland	vs Italy (GM)	1
8	Eric Dier	England	vs Russia (GM)	1
8	Julian Draxler	Germany	vs Slovakia (R16)	1
8	Éder	Italy	vs Sweden (GM)	1
8	Emanuele Giaccherini	Italy	vs Belgium (GM)	1
8	Olivier Giroud	France	vs Iceland (QF)	1
8	Marek Hamšík	Slovakia	vs Russia (GM)	1
8	Wes Hoolahan	Republic of Ireland	vs Sweden (GM)	1
8	László Kleinheisler	Hungary	vs Austria (GM)	1
8	Matúš Kozáčik	Slovakia	vs England (GM)	1
8	Toni Kroos	Germany	vs Ukraine (GM)	1
8	Grzegorz Krychowiak	Poland	vs Northern Ireland (GM)	1
8	Gareth McAuley	Northern Ireland	vs Ukraine (GM)	1
8	Ivan Perišić	Croatia	vs Spain (GM)	1
8	Ivan Rakitić	Croatia	vs Czech Republic (GM)	1
8	Luka Modrić	Croatia	vs Turkey (GM)	1
8	João Moutinho	Portugal	vs Austria (GM)	1
8	Nani	Portugal	vs Iceland (GM)	1
8	Manuel Neuer	Germany	vs Italy (QF)	1
8	Mesut Özil	Germany	vs Northern Ireland (GM)	1
8	Pepe	Portugal	vs France (FI)	1
8	Aaron Ramsey	Wales	vs Russia (GM)	1
8	Hal Robson-Kanu	Wales	vs Belgium (QF)	1
8	Ruslan Rotan	Ukraine	vs Poland (GM)	1
8	Xherdan Shaqiri	Switzerland	vs Poland (R16)	1
8	Kolbeinn Sigþórsson	Iceland	vs Hungary (GM)	1
8	Ragnar Sigurðsson	Iceland	vs England (R16)	1
8	Yann Sommer	Switzerland	vs France (GM)	1
8	Kyle Walker	England	vs Wales (GM)	1
8	Axel Witsel	Belgium	vs Republic of Ireland (GM)	1
8	Burak Yılmaz	Turkey	vs Czech Republic (GM)	1

== Scoring ==
Overview

- Total number of goals scored: 108
- Average goals per match: 2.12
- Total number of braces: 7
  Cristiano Ronaldo, Balázs Dzsudzsák, Olivier Giroud, Antoine Griezmann (2), Romelu Lukaku, Álvaro Morata
- Total number of penalty kicks awarded: 12
- Total number of penalty kicks scored: 8
  Bogdan Stancu for Romania against France and Switzerland
  Tomáš Necid for Czech Republic against Croatia
  Gylfi Sigurðsson for Iceland against Hungary
  Robbie Brady for Republic of Ireland against France
  Wayne Rooney for England against Iceland
  Leonardo Bonucci for Italy against Germany
  Antoine Griezmann for France against Germany
- Total number of penalty kicks missed or saved: 4
  Cristiano Ronaldo for Portugal against Austria
  Sergio Ramos for Spain against Croatia
  Aleksandar Dragović for Austria against Iceland
  Mesut Özil for Germany against Slovakia
- Penalty kick success rate: 66.67%
- Own goals scored: 3
  Ciaran Clark, Gareth McAuley, Birkir Már Sævarsson

Timing

- First goal of the tournament: Olivier Giroud for France against Romania
- First brace of the tournament: Álvaro Morata for Spain against Turkey
- Last goal of the tournament: Éder for Portugal against France
- Last brace of the tournament: Antoine Griezmann for France against Germany
- Fastest goal in a match from kickoff: 2nd minute (1:40)
  Robert Lewandowski for Poland against Portugal
- Fastest goal in a match after coming on as a substitute: 1 minute
  Ondrej Duda for Slovakia against Wales (introduced in the 60th minute)
- Latest goal in a match without extra time: 90+6th minute
  Dimitri Payet for France against Albania, Niall McGinn for Northern Ireland against Ukraine
- Latest goal in a match with extra time: 117th minute
  Ricardo Quaresma for Portugal against Croatia
- Latest winning goal in a match without extra time: 90+4th minute
  Arnór Ingvi Traustason for Iceland against Austria
- Latest winning goal in a match with extra time: 117th minute
  Ricardo Quaresma for Portugal against Croatia
- Shortest time difference between two goals scored by the same team in a match: 2 minutes
  Michy Batshuayi and Eden Hazard for Belgium against Hungary

Teams

- Most goals scored by a team: 13
  France
- Fewest goals scored by a team: 0
  Ukraine
- Most goals conceded by a team: 9
  Iceland
- Fewest goals conceded by a team: 2
  Italy, Poland, Switzerland
- Best goal difference: +8
  France
- Worst goal difference: –5
  Ukraine
- Most goals scored in a match by both teams: 7
  France (5–2) Iceland
- Most goals scored in a match by one team: 5
  France against Iceland
- Most goals scored in a match by the losing team: 2
  Iceland against France
- Biggest margin of victory: 4 goals
  Hungary (0–4) Belgium
- Most clean sheets achieved by a team: 4
  Germany, Portugal
- Fewest clean sheets achieved by a team: 0
  Czech Republic, Iceland, Romania, Russia, Sweden, Ukraine
- Most clean sheets given by an opposing team: 3
  Northern Ireland, Ukraine
- Fewest clean sheets given by an opposing team: 0
  Iceland
- Most consecutive clean sheets achieved by a team: 4
  Germany
- Most consecutive clean sheets given by an opposing team: 3
  Ukraine

Individual

- Most goals scored by an individual: 6
  Antoine Griezmann
- Most assists provided by an individual: 4
  Eden Hazard, Aaron Ramsey
- Most goals and assists produced by an individual: 8
  Antoine Griezmann (6 goals, 2 assists)
- Most clean sheets achieved by a goalkeeper: 4
  Manuel Neuer, Rui Patrício
- Fewest clean sheets achieved by a goalkeeper: 0
  Igor Akinfeev, Petr Čech, Hannes Þór Halldórsson, Andreas Isaksson, Andriy Pyatov, Salvatore Sirigu, Ciprian Tătărușanu, Danny Ward
- Most consecutive clean sheets achieved by a goalkeeper: 4
  Manuel Neuer
- Most goals scored by one player in a match: 2
  Álvaro Morata for Spain against Turkey, Romelu Lukaku for Belgium against Republic of Ireland, Balázs Dzsudzsák for Hungary against Portugal, Cristiano Ronaldo for Portugal against Hungary, Antoine Griezmann for France against Republic of Ireland, Olivier Giroud for France against Iceland, Antoine Griezmann for France against Germany
- Oldest goal scorer: 37 years and 61 days
  Zoltán Gera for Hungary against Portugal
- Youngest goal scorer: 18 years and 317 days
  Renato Sanches for Portugal against Poland

== Attendance ==
- Overall attendance: 2,427,303
- Average attendance per match: 47,594
- Highest attendance: 76,833 – France vs Iceland
- Lowest attendance: 28,840 – Russia vs Wales

== Wins and losses ==
- Most wins: 5 – France
- Fewest wins: 0 – Austria, Czech Republic, Romania, Russia, Sweden, Ukraine
- Most losses: 3 – Northern Ireland, Ukraine
- Fewest losses: 0 – Poland, Portugal, Switzerland
- Most draws: 4 – Portugal
- Fewest draws: 0 – Albania, Belgium, Northern Ireland, Spain, Turkey, Ukraine, Wales
- Most points in the group stage: 7 – Croatia, France, Germany, Poland
- Fewest points in the group stage: 0 – Ukraine

== Discipline ==
=== Summary ===
- Total number of yellow cards: 205
- Average yellow cards per match: 4.02
- Total number of red cards: 3
- Average red cards per match: 0.06
- First yellow card of the tournament:
  Vlad Chiricheș for Romania against France
- First red card of the tournament:
  Lorik Cana for Albania against Switzerland
- Fastest yellow card from kick off: 2nd minute
  Sergio Ramos for Spain against Turkey
- Fastest yellow card after coming on as a substitute: 1 minute
  Ergys Kaçe for Albania against Switzerland (introduced in the 62nd minute)
- Latest yellow card in a match without extra time: 90+4th minute
  Alfreð Finnbogason for Iceland against Portugal, Breel Embolo for Switzerland against Romania, Jonny Evans for Northern Ireland against Ukraine, Elseid Hysaj for Albania against Romania, Aaron Ramsey for Wales against Northern Ireland
- Latest yellow card in a match with extra time: 120+3rd minute
  Rui Patrício for Portugal against France
- Fastest dismissal from kick off: 36th minute
  Lorik Cana for Albania against Switzerland
- Latest dismissal in a match without extra time: 66th minute
  Aleksandar Dragović for Austria against Hungary, Shane Duffy for Republic of Ireland against France
- Shortest time difference between two yellow cards given to the same player: 13 minutes
  Lorik Cana for Albania against Switzerland (booked in the 23rd minute and again in the 36th minute)
- Most yellow cards (team): 18
  Italy
- Most red cards (team): 1
  Albania, Austria, Republic of Ireland
- Fewest yellow cards (team): 2
  Russia
- Most yellow cards (player): 3
  William Carvalho, N'Golo Kanté, Bartosz Kapustka
- Most red cards (player): 1
  Lorik Cana, Aleksandar Dragović, Shane Duffy
- Most yellow cards (match): 10
  Portugal vs France
- Most red cards (match): 1
  Albania vs Switzerland, Austria vs Hungary, France vs Republic of Ireland
- Fewest yellow cards (match): 0
  Northern Ireland vs Germany
- Most cards in one match: 10
  Portugal vs France (10 yellow cards)

=== Sanctions ===
==== By match ====
Day	Home	Score	Away	Round	Referee	Total cards	Booked	(yellow card) (yellow-red card)	Sent off (straight red)
Group stage
Day 1	France	2–1	Romania	Group A	(Hungary) Viktor Kassai	4	4	0	0
Day 2	Albania	0–1	Switzerland	Group A	(Spain) Carlos Velasco Carballo	8	7	1	0
Day 2	Wales	2–1	Slovakia	Group B	(Norway) Svein Oddvar Moen	5	5	0	0
Day 2	England	1–1	Russia	Group B	(Italy) Nicola Rizzoli	2	2	0	0
Day 3	Turkey	0–1	Croatia	Group D	(Sweden) Jonas Eriksson	4	4	0	0
Day 3	Poland	1–0	Northern Ireland	Group C	(Romania) Ovidiu Hațegan	3	3	0	0
Day 3	Germany	2–0	Ukraine	Group C	(England) Martin Atkinson	1	1	0	0
Day 4	Spain	1–0	Czech Republic	Group D	(Poland) Szymon Marciniak	1	1	0	0
Day 4	Republic of Ireland	1–1	Sweden	Group E	(Serbia) Milorad Mažić	3	3	0	0
Day 4	Belgium	0–2	Italy	Group E	(England) Mark Clattenburg	5	5	0	0
Day 5	Austria	0–2	Hungary	Group F	(France) Clément Turpin	4	3	1	0
Day 5	Portugal	1–1	Iceland	Group F	(Turkey) Cüneyt Çakır	2	2	0	0
Day 6	Russia	1–2	Slovakia	Group B	(Slovenia) Damir Skomina	1	1	0	0
Day 6	Romania	1–1	Switzerland	Group A	(Russia) Sergei Karasev	6	6	0	0
Day 6	France	2–0	Albania	Group A	(Scotland) Willie Collum	3	3	0	0
Day 7	England	2–1	Wales	Group B	(Germany) Felix Brych	1	1	0	0
Day 7	Ukraine	0–2	Northern Ireland	Group C	(Czech Republic) Pavel Královec	5	5	0	0
Day 7	Germany	0–0	Poland	Group C	(Netherlands) Björn Kuipers	6	6	0	0
Day 8	Italy	1–0	Sweden	Group E	(Hungary) Viktor Kassai	3	3	0	0
Day 8	Czech Republic	2–2	Croatia	Group D	(England) Mark Clattenburg	4	4	0	0
Day 8	Spain	3–0	Turkey	Group D	(Serbia) Milorad Mažić	3	3	0	0
Day 9	Belgium	3–0	Republic of Ireland	Group E	(Turkey) Cüneyt Çakır	2	2	0	0
Day 9	Iceland	1–1	Hungary	Group F	(Russia) Sergei Karasev	6	6	0	0
Day 9	Portugal	0–0	Austria	Group F	(Italy) Nicola Rizzoli	6	6	0	0
Day 10	Romania	0–1	Albania	Group A	(Czech Republic) Pavel Královec	6	6	0	0
Day 10	Switzerland	0–0	France	Group A	(Slovenia) Damir Skomina	2	2	0	0
Day 11	Russia	0–3	Wales	Group B	(Sweden) Jonas Eriksson	2	2	0	0
Day 11	Slovakia	0–0	England	Group B	(Spain) Carlos Velasco Carballo	2	2	0	0
Day 12	Ukraine	0–1	Poland	Group C	(Norway) Svein Oddvar Moen	3	3	0	0
Day 12	Northern Ireland	0–1	Germany	Group C	(France) Clément Turpin	0	0	0	0
Day 12	Czech Republic	0–2	Turkey	Group D	(Scotland) Willie Collum	5	5	0	0
Day 12	Croatia	2–1	Spain	Group D	(Netherlands) Björn Kuipers	4	4	0	0
Day 13	Iceland	2–1	Austria	Group F	(Poland) Szymon Marciniak	5	5	0	0
Day 13	Hungary	3–3	Portugal	Group F	(England) Martin Atkinson	4	4	0	0
Day 13	Italy	0–1	Republic of Ireland	Group E	(Romania) Ovidiu Hațegan	6	6	0	0
Day 13	Sweden	0–1	Belgium	Group E	(Germany) Felix Brych	4	4	0	0
Round of 16
Day 14	Switzerland	1–1 (a.e.t.) (4–5 p)	Poland	Round of 16	(England) Mark Clattenburg	4	4	0	0
Day 14	Wales	1–0	Northern Ireland	Round of 16	(England) Martin Atkinson	4	4	0	0
Day 14	Croatia	0–1 (a.e.t.)	Portugal	Round of 16	(Spain) Carlos Velasco Carballo	1	1	0	0
Day 15	France	2–1	Republic of Ireland	Round of 16	(Italy) Nicola Rizzoli	6	5	0	1
Day 15	Germany	3–0	Slovakia	Round of 16	(Poland) Szymon Marciniak	4	4	0	0
Day 15	Hungary	0–4	Belgium	Round of 16	(Serbia) Milorad Mažić	7	7	0	0
Day 16	Italy	2–0	Spain	Round of 16	(Turkey) Cüneyt Çakır	7	7	0	0
Day 16	England	1–2	Iceland	Round of 16	(Slovenia) Damir Skomina	3	3	0	0
Quarter-finals
Day 17	Poland	1–1 (a.e.t.) (3–5 p)	Portugal	Quarter-finals	(Germany) Felix Brych	5	5	0	0
Day 18	Wales	3–1	Belgium	Quarter-finals	(Slovenia) Damir Skomina	6	6	0	0
Day 19	Germany	1–1 (a.e.t.) (6–5 p)	Italy	Quarter-finals	(Hungary) Viktor Kassai	7	7	0	0
Day 20	France	5–2	Iceland	Quarter-finals	(Netherlands) Björn Kuipers	2	2	0	0
Semi-finals
Day 21	Portugal	2–0	Wales	Semi-finals	(Sweden) Jonas Eriksson	5	5	0	0
Day 22	Germany	0–2	France	Semi-finals	(Italy) Nicola Rizzoli	6	6	0	0
Final
Day 23	Portugal	1–0 (a.e.t.)	France	Final	(England) Mark Clattenburg	10	10	0	0

==== By referee ====
Referee	Nation	Pld	Red card	Yellow card	Pen.	Red cards
Nicola Rizzoli	Italy	4	1	19	3	1 straight red
Mark Clattenburg	England	4	0	23	0	—N/a
Damir Skomina	Slovenia	4	0	12	1	—N/a
Carlos Velasco Carballo	Spain	3	1	10	0	1 second yellow
Viktor Kassai	Hungary	3	0	14	2	—N/a
Milorad Mažić	Serbia	3	0	13	0	—N/a
Björn Kuipers	Netherlands	3	0	12	1	—N/a
Cüneyt Çakır	Turkey	3	0	11	0	—N/a
Jonas Eriksson	Sweden	3	0	11	0	—N/a
Szymon Marciniak	Poland	3	0	10	2	—N/a
Felix Brych	Germany	3	0	10	0	—N/a
Martin Atkinson	England	3	0	9	0	—N/a
Clément Turpin	France	2	1	3	0	1 second yellow
Sergei Karasev	Russia	2	0	12	2	—N/a
Pavel Královec	Czech Republic	2	0	11	0	—N/a
Ovidiu Hațegan	Romania	2	0	9	0	—N/a
Willie Collum	Scotland	2	0	8	0	—N/a
Svein Oddvar Moen	Norway	2	0	8	0	—N/a

==== By team ====
Team	Red card	Yellow card	Red cards	Suspensions
Albania	1	10	L. Cana vs Switzerland (second booking)	L. Cana vs France; B. Kukeli vs Romania
Republic of Ireland	1	8	S. Duffy vs France (straight red)	S. Duffy vs Serbia (Note: As Duffy was sent off in the match in which his team was eliminated, he missed the next competitive international match for the Republic of Ireland (a World Cup qualifying match vs Serbia on 5 September 2016).)
Austria	1	7	A. Dragović vs Hungary (second booking)	A. Dragović vs Portugal
Italy	0	18	—N/a	T. Motta vs Germany
France	0	13	—N/a	N. Kanté, A. Rami vs Iceland
Portugal	0	13	—N/a	W. Carvalho vs Wales
Hungary	0	12	—N/a	—N/a
Iceland	0	12	—N/a	A. Finnbogason vs Austria
Germany	0	11	—N/a	M. Hummels vs France
Poland	0	11	—N/a	B. Kapustka vs Switzerland
Wales	0	11	—N/a	B. Davies, A. Ramsey vs Portugal
Romania	0	10	—N/a	—N/a
Belgium	0	9	—N/a	T. Vermaelen vs Wales
Slovakia	0	9	—N/a	—N/a
Croatia	0	8	—N/a	D. Čop vs Turkey (Note: Čop was suspended for his team's first match of the tournament after being sent off during a qualification match against Bulgaria on 10 October 2015.)
Turkey	0	7	—N/a	—N/a
Northern Ireland	0	6	—N/a	—N/a
Switzerland	0	6	—N/a	—N/a
Czech Republic	0	5	—N/a	M. Suchý vs Spain (Note: Suchý was suspended for his team's first match of the tournament after being sent off during a qualification match against the Netherlands on 13 October 2015.)
Spain	0	5	—N/a	—N/a
Ukraine	0	5	—N/a	—N/a
Sweden	0	4	—N/a	—N/a
England	0	3	—N/a	—N/a
Russia	0	2	—N/a	—N/a

==== By individual ====
Player	Team	Red card	Yellow card	Suspended for match(es)
Lorik Cana	Albania	1	2	vs France
Aleksandar Dragović	Austria	1	2	vs Portugal
Shane Duffy	Republic of Ireland	1	0	vs Serbia
William Carvalho	Portugal	0	3	vs Wales
N'Golo Kanté	France	0	3	vs Iceland
Bartosz Kapustka	Poland	0	3	vs Switzerland
Hakan Balta	Turkey	0	2	—N/a
Birkir Bjarnason	Iceland	0	2	—N/a
James Chester	Wales	0	2	—N/a
Stuart Dallas	Northern Ireland	0	2	—N/a
Ben Davies	Wales	0	2	vs Portugal
Mattia De Sciglio	Italy	0	2	—N/a
Marouane Fellaini	Belgium	0	2	—N/a
Alfreð Finnbogason	Iceland	0	2	vs Austria
Jeff Hendrick	Republic of Ireland	0	2	—N/a
Mats Hummels	Germany	0	2	vs France
Artur Jędrzejczyk	Poland	0	2	—N/a
Tamás Kádár	Hungary	0	2	—N/a
Laurent Koscielny	France	0	2	—N/a
Juraj Kucka	Slovakia	0	2	—N/a
Burim Kukeli	Albania	0	2	vs Romania
Shane Long	Republic of Ireland	0	2	—N/a
Thiago Motta	Italy	0	2	vs Germany
Graziano Pellè	Italy	0	2	—N/a
Mesut Özil	Germany	0	2	—N/a
Adil Rami	France	0	2	vs Iceland
Aaron Ramsey	Wales	0	2	vs Portugal
Fabian Schär	Switzerland	0	2	—N/a
Bastian Schweinsteiger	Germany	0	2	—N/a
Martin Škrtel	Slovakia	0	2	—N/a
Samuel Umtiti	France	0	2	—N/a
Thomas Vermaelen	Belgium	0	2	vs Wales
Amir Abrashi	Albania	0	1	—N/a
Jordi Alba	Spain	0	1	—N/a
Toby Alderweireld	Belgium	0	1	—N/a
Joe Allen	Wales	0	1	—N/a
Bruno Alves	Portugal	0	1	—N/a
Kári Árnason	Iceland	0	1	—N/a
Milan Badelj	Croatia	0	1	—N/a
Gareth Bale	Wales	0	1	—N/a
Andrea Barzagli	Italy	0	1	—N/a
Migjen Basha	Albania	0	1	—N/a
Michy Batshuayi	Belgium	0	1	—N/a
Valon Behrami	Switzerland	0	1	—N/a
Ryan Bertrand	England	0	1	—N/a
Jérôme Boateng	Germany	0	1	—N/a
Leonardo Bonucci	Italy	0	1	—N/a
Marcelo Brozović	Croatia	0	1	—N/a
Gianluigi Buffon	Italy	0	1	—N/a
Sergio Busquets	Spain	0	1	—N/a
Gary Cahill	England	0	1	—N/a
Emre Can	Germany	0	1	—N/a
Craig Cathcart	Northern Ireland	0	1	—N/a
Cédric	Portugal	0	1	—N/a
Giorgio Chiellini	Italy	0	1	—N/a
Alexandru Chipciu	Romania	0	1	—N/a
Vlad Chiricheș	Romania	0	1	—N/a
Séamus Coleman	Republic of Ireland	0	1	—N/a
Cristiano Ronaldo	Portugal	0	1	—N/a
Steven Davis	Northern Ireland	0	1	—N/a
Daniele De Rossi	Italy	0	1	—N/a
Johan Djourou	Switzerland	0	1	—N/a
Julian Draxler	Germany	0	1	—N/a
Ján Ďurica	Slovakia	0	1	—N/a
Balázs Dzsudzsák	Hungary	0	1	—N/a
Éder	Italy	0	1	—N/a
Albin Ekdal	Sweden	0	1	—N/a
Ákos Elek	Hungary	0	1	—N/a
Breel Embolo	Switzerland	0	1	—N/a
Jonny Evans	Northern Ireland	0	1	—N/a
Patrice Evra	France	0	1	—N/a
José Fonte	Portugal	0	1	—N/a
Christian Fuchs	Austria	0	1	—N/a
Zoltán Gera	Hungary	0	1	—N/a
Emanuele Giaccherini	Italy	0	1	—N/a
Olivier Giroud	France	0	1	—N/a
Kamil Glik	Poland	0	1	—N/a
Dragoș Grigore	Romania	0	1	—N/a
Kamil Grosicki	Poland	0	1	—N/a
Jóhann Berg Guðmundsson	Iceland	0	1	—N/a
Raphaël Guerreiro	Portugal	0	1	—N/a
Aron Gunnarsson	Iceland	0	1	—N/a
Chris Gunter	Wales	0	1	—N/a
Richárd Guzmics	Hungary	0	1	—N/a
Hannes Þór Halldórsson	Iceland	0	1	—N/a
Martin Harnik	Austria	0	1	—N/a
Martin Hinteregger	Austria	0	1	—N/a
Patrik Hrošovský	Slovakia	0	1	—N/a
Elseid Hysaj	Albania	0	1	—N/a
Lorenzo Insigne	Italy	0	1	—N/a
Marc Janko	Austria	0	1	—N/a
João Mário	Portugal	0	1	—N/a
Erik Johansson	Sweden	0	1	—N/a
Roland Juhász	Hungary	0	1	—N/a
Ergys Kaçe	Albania	0	1	—N/a
Claudiu Keșerü	Romania	0	1	—N/a
Sami Khedira	Germany	0	1	—N/a
Joshua Kimmich	Germany	0	1	—N/a
László Kleinheisler	Hungary	0	1	—N/a
Yevhen Konoplyanka	Ukraine	0	1	—N/a
İsmail Köybaşı	Turkey	0	1	—N/a
Oleksandr Kucher	Ukraine	0	1	—N/a
Ádám Lang	Hungary	0	1	—N/a
David Limberský	Czech Republic	0	1	—N/a
Victor Lindelöf	Sweden	0	1	—N/a
Krzysztof Mączyński	Poland	0	1	—N/a
Róbert Mak	Slovakia	0	1	—N/a
Pavel Mamayev	Russia	0	1	—N/a
Alexandru Mățel	Romania	0	1	—N/a
Blaise Matuidi	France	0	1	—N/a
Mërgim Mavraj	Albania	0	1	—N/a
James McCarthy	Republic of Ireland	0	1	—N/a
Ledian Memushaj	Albania	0	1	—N/a
Thomas Meunier	Belgium	0	1	—N/a
Ádám Nagy	Hungary	0	1	—N/a
Krisztián Németh	Hungary	0	1	—N/a
Nolito	Spain	0	1	—N/a
Martin Olsson	Sweden	0	1	—N/a
Marco Parolo	Italy	0	1	—N/a
Rui Patrício	Portugal	0	1	—N/a
David Pavelka	Czech Republic	0	1	—N/a
Michał Pazdan	Poland	0	1	—N/a
Viktor Pečovský	Slovakia	0	1	—N/a
Pepe	Portugal	0	1	—N/a
Ivan Perišić	Croatia	0	1	—N/a
Sławomir Peszko	Poland	0	1	—N/a
Łukasz Piszczek	Poland	0	1	—N/a
Jaroslav Plašil	Czech Republic	0	1	—N/a
Paul Pogba	France	0	1	—N/a
Adrian Popa	Romania	0	1	—N/a
Andrei Prepeliță	Romania	0	1	—N/a
Ricardo Quaresma	Portugal	0	1	—N/a
Sergio Ramos	Spain	0	1	—N/a
Răzvan Raț	Romania	0	1	—N/a
Marko Rog	Croatia	0	1	—N/a
Ruslan Rotan	Ukraine	0	1	—N/a
Birkir Már Sævarsson	Iceland	0	1	—N/a
Cristian Săpunaru	Romania	0	1	—N/a
Alessandro Schöpf	Austria	0	1	—N/a
Yevhen Seleznyov	Ukraine	0	1	—N/a
Volkan Şen	Turkey	0	1	—N/a
Georgi Shchennikov	Russia	0	1	—N/a
Kolbeinn Sigþórsson	Iceland	0	1	—N/a
Gylfi Sigurðsson	Iceland	0	1	—N/a
Adrien Silva	Portugal	0	1	—N/a
David Silva	Spain	0	1	—N/a
Salvatore Sirigu	Italy	0	1	—N/a
Tomáš Sivok	Czech Republic	0	1	—N/a
Ari Freyr Skúlason	Iceland	0	1	—N/a
Darijo Srna	Croatia	0	1	—N/a
Ivan Strinić	Croatia	0	1	—N/a
Stefano Sturaro	Italy	0	1	—N/a
Daniel Sturridge	England	0	1	—N/a
Josef Šural	Czech Republic	0	1	—N/a
Serhiy Sydorchuk	Ukraine	0	1	—N/a
Ádám Szalai	Hungary	0	1	—N/a
Neil Taylor	Wales	0	1	—N/a
Gabriel Torje	Romania	0	1	—N/a
Cenk Tosun	Turkey	0	1	—N/a
Ozan Tufan	Turkey	0	1	—N/a
Jan Vertonghen	Belgium	0	1	—N/a
Domagoj Vida	Croatia	0	1	—N/a
Sam Vokes	Wales	0	1	—N/a
Šime Vrsaljko	Croatia	0	1	—N/a
Jamie Ward	Northern Ireland	0	1	—N/a
Stephen Ward	Republic of Ireland	0	1	—N/a
Vladimír Weiss	Slovakia	0	1	—N/a
Glenn Whelan	Republic of Ireland	0	1	—N/a
Axel Witsel	Belgium	0	1	—N/a
Granit Xhaka	Switzerland	0	1	—N/a
Burak Yılmaz	Turkey	0	1	—N/a
Simone Zaza	Italy	0	1	—N/a
Duje Čop	Croatia	0	0	vs Turkey
Marek Suchý	Czech Republic	0	0	vs Spain

== Overall statistics ==
Team	Pld	W	D	L	Pts	APts	GF	AGF	GA	AGA	GD	AGD	CS	ACS	YC	AYC	RC	ARC
Albania	3	1	0	2	3	1.00	1	0.33	3	1.00	−2	−0.67	1	0.33	10	3.33	**1**	**0.33**
Austria	3	0	1	2	1	0.33	1	0.33	4	1.33	−3	−1.00	1	0.33	7	2.33	**1**	**0.33**
Belgium	5	3	0	2	9	1.80	9	1.80	5	1.00	+4	0.80	3	0.60	9	1.80	0	0.00
Croatia	4	2	1	1	7	1.75	5	1.25	4	1.00	+1	0.25	1	0.25	8	2.00	0	0.00
Czech Republic	3	0	1	2	1	0.33	2	0.67	5	1.67	−3	−1.00	0	0.00	5	1.67	0	0.00
England	4	1	2	1	5	1.25	4	1.00	4	1.00	0	0.00	1	0.25	3	0.75	0	0.00
France	**7**	**5**	1	1	**16**	**2.29**	**13**	**1.86**	5	0.71	**+8**	**1.14**	3	0.43	13	1.86	0	0.00
Germany	6	3	2	1	11	1.83	7	1.17	3	0.50	+4	0.67	**4**	**0.67**	11	1.83	0	0.00
Hungary	4	1	2	1	5	1.25	6	1.50	8	**2.00**	−2	−0.50	1	0.25	12	3.00	0	0.00
Iceland	5	2	2	1	8	1.60	8	1.60	**9**	1.80	−1	−0.20	0	0.00	12	2.40	0	0.00
Italy	5	3	1	1	10	2.00	6	1.20	2	0.40	+4	0.80	3	0.60	**18**	**3.60**	0	0.00
Northern Ireland	4	1	0	**3**	3	0.75	2	0.50	3	0.75	−1	−0.25	1	0.25	6	1.50	0	0.00
Poland	5	2	3	0	9	1.80	4	0.80	2	0.40	+2	0.40	3	0.60	11	2.20	0	0.00
**Portugal**	**7**	3	**4**	0	13	1.86	9	1.29	5	0.71	+4	0.57	**4**	0.57	13	1.86	0	0.00
Republic of Ireland	4	1	1	2	4	1.00	3	0.75	6	1.50	−3	−0.75	1	0.25	8	2.00	**1**	0.25
Romania	3	0	1	2	1	0.33	2	0.67	4	1.33	−2	−0.67	0	0.00	10	3.33	0	0.00
Russia	3	0	1	2	1	0.33	2	0.67	6	**2.00**	−4	−1.33	0	0.00	2	0.67	0	0.00
Slovakia	4	1	1	2	4	1.00	3	0.75	6	1.50	−3	−0.75	1	0.25	9	2.25	0	0.00
Spain	4	2	0	2	6	1.50	5	1.25	4	1.00	+1	0.25	2	0.50	5	1.25	0	0.00
Sweden	3	0	1	2	1	0.33	1	0.33	3	1.00	−2	−0.67	0	0.00	4	1.33	0	0.00
Switzerland	4	1	3	0	6	1.50	3	0.75	2	0.50	+1	0.25	2	0.50	6	1.50	0	0.00
Turkey	3	1	0	2	3	1.00	2	0.67	4	1.33	−2	−0.67	1	0.33	7	2.33	0	0.00
Ukraine	3	0	0	**3**	0	0.00	0	0.00	5	1.67	−5	−1.67	0	0.00	5	1.67	0	0.00
Wales	6	4	0	2	12	2.00	10	1.67	6	1.00	+4	0.67	2	0.33	11	1.83	0	0.00
Total	51^{(1)}	37	14^{(2)}	37	139	1.36	108	1.06	108	1.06	0	0.00	34	0.33	205	2.01	3	0.03

Team(s) rendered in italics represent(s) the host nation(s). The competition's winning team is rendered in bold.
^{(1)} – Total games lost not counted in total games played (total games lost = total games won)
^{(2)} – Total number of games drawn (tied) for all teams = Total number of games drawn (tied) ÷ 2 (both teams involved)
^{(3)} – As per statistical convention in football, matches decided in extra time are counted as wins and losses, while matches decided by penalty shoot-outs are counted as draws.
