= Iceland at the FIFA World Cup =

International football delegation

The FIFA World Cup, sometimes called the Football World Cup or the Soccer World Cup, but usually referred to simply as the World Cup, is an international association football competition contested by the men's national teams of the members of Fédération Internationale de Football Association (FIFA), the sport's global governing body. The championship has been awarded every four years since the first tournament in 1930, except in 1942 and 1946, due to World War II.

The tournament consists of two parts, the qualification phase and the final phase (officially called the World Cup Finals). The qualification phase, which currently take place over the three years preceding the Finals, is used to determine which teams qualify for the Finals. The current format of the Finals involves 48 teams competing for the title, at venues within the host nation (or nations) over a period of about a month. The World Cup final is the most widely viewed sporting event in the world, with an estimated 715.1 million people watching the 2006 tournament final.

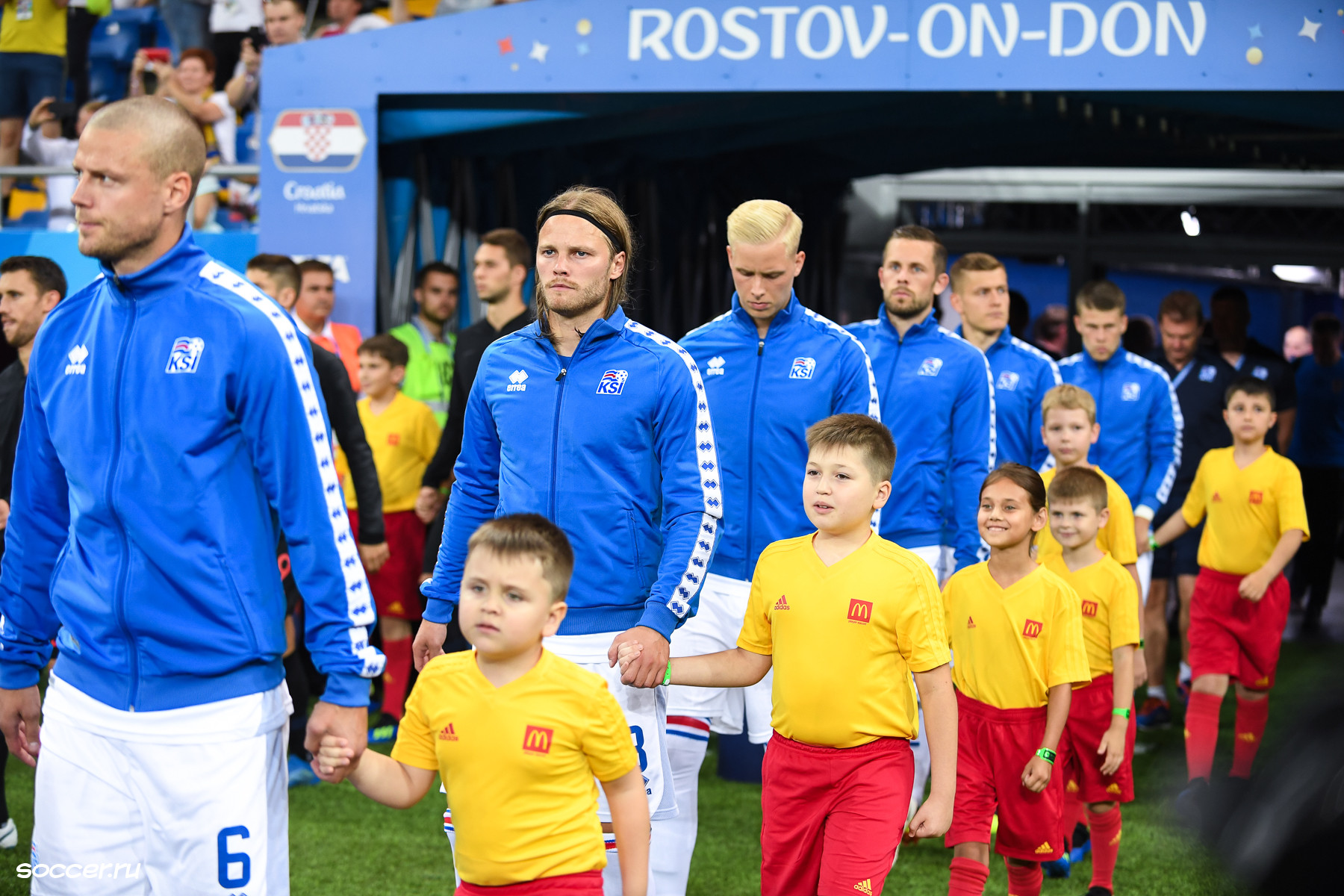
Iceland national football team at the 2018 FIFA World Cup in Rostov-on-Don, Russia

Iceland made its debut at the FIFA World Cup in 2018 after having failed 12 consecutive qualification campaigns from 1974 to 2014. The nation first attempted to qualify for the tournament back in 1958.

The 2018 FIFA World Cup was Iceland's second major international tournament, having also qualified for UEFA Euro 2016.

Iceland was the smallest nation to have reached the World Cup Group Stage until Curaçao's qualification during the 2026 World Cup, and is still the smallest independent nation.

== Record at the FIFA World Cup ==
FIFA World Cup record
Year	Round	Position	Pld	W	D*	L	GF	GA
(Uruguay) 1930	Did not enter							
(Italy) 1934	Did not enter							
(France) 1938	Did not enter							
(Brazil) 1950	Did not enter							
(Switzerland) 1954	Entry not accepted by FIFA							
(Sweden) 1958	Did not qualify							
(Chile) 1962	Did not enter							
(England) 1966	Did not enter							
(Mexico) 1970	Did not enter							
(West Germany) 1974	Did not qualify							
(Argentina) 1978	Did not qualify							
(Spain) 1982	Did not qualify							
(Mexico) 1986	Did not qualify							
(Italy) 1990	Did not qualify							
(United States) 1994	Did not qualify							
(France) 1998	Did not qualify							
(South Korea) (Japan) 2002	Did not qualify							
(Germany) 2006	Did not qualify							
(South Africa) 2010	Did not qualify							
(Brazil) 2014	Did not qualify							
(Russia) 2018	Group stage	28th	3	0	1	2	2	5
(Qatar) 2022	Did not qualify							
(Canada) (Mexico) (United States) 2026	Did not qualify							
(Morocco) (Portugal) (Spain) 2030	To be determined							
(Saudi Arabia) 2034	To be determined							
Total	Group stage	1/23	3	0	1	2	2	5

*Draws include knockout matches decided via penalty shoot-out.

== Head-to-head record ==
Opponent	Pld	W	D	L	GF	GA	GD	Win %
Argentina	1	0	1	0	1	1	+0	0.00
Croatia	1	0	0	1	1	2	−1	0.00
Nigeria	1	0	0	1	0	2	−2	0.00
Total	3	0	1	2	2	5	−3	0.00

== Russia 2018 ==
Following a 2–0 home win over Kosovo in the final round of the qualifiers, Iceland secured their spot in Russia 2018, finishing top of Group I by two points over Croatia, who had defeated Iceland in the World Cup play-offs four years earlier. Despite finishing bottom of the group, Iceland drew against Argentina 1–1 in the opening match of the group.

=== Group stage ===
Pos	Team	Pld	W	D	L	GF	GA	GD	Pts	Qualification
1	Croatia	3	3	0	0	7	1	+6	9	Advance to knockout stage
2	Argentina	3	1	1	1	3	5	−2	4	Advance to knockout stage
3	Nigeria	3	1	0	2	3	4	−1	3	
4	Iceland	3	0	1	2	2	5	−3	1	

Source: FIFA
Rules for classification: Group stage tiebreakers
16 June 2018
16:00 MSK (UTC+3)

Argentina	1–1	Iceland
Agüero 19'		Finnbogason 23'

Otkritie Arena, Moscow
Attendance: 44,190
Referee: Szymon Marciniak (Poland)

22 June 2018
18:00 MSK (UTC+3)

Nigeria	2–0	Iceland
Musa 49', 75'

Volgograd Arena, Volgograd
Attendance: 40,904
Referee: Matthew Conger (New Zealand)

26 June 2018
21:00 MSK (UTC+3)

Iceland	1–2	Croatia
Sigurðsson 76' (pen.)		Badelj 53'; Perišić 90'

Rostov Arena, Rostov-on-Don
Attendance: 43,472
Referee: Antonio Mateu Lahoz (Spain)

== Player records ==
=== Most appearances ===
Nine players were fielded in all three of Iceland's 2018 FIFA World Cup matches.

Rank	Player	Matches
1	Birkir Bjarnason	3
1	Alfreð Finnbogason	3
1	Aron Gunnarsson	3
1	Hannes Halldórsson	3
1	Hörður Magnússon	3
1	Birkir Sævarsson	3
1	Björn Sigurðarson	3
1	Gylfi Sigurðsson	3
1	Ragnar Sigurðsson	3

=== Goalscorers ===
On 16 June 2018, Alfreð Finnbogason scored Iceland's first-ever FIFA World Cup goal during their 1–1 draw against Argentina in Moscow.

Player	Goals	2018
Alfreð Finnbogason	1	1
Gylfi Sigurðsson	1	1
Total	2	2

== See also ==
- Iceland at the UEFA European Championship
