= Iceland at the UEFA European Championship =

International football delegation

Iceland qualified once for a UEFA European Championship, the 2016 edition. They directly qualified after securing the second spot in their qualifying group, with still four group matches remaining; this meant they would appear on a major tournament finals for the first time in their history. For the draw of the end stage that took place on 12 December 2015, they were seeded in Pot 4.

In Euro 2016, Iceland came second in their group unbeaten (which included a draw against Portugal and a win over Austria). In the round of 16, they famously beat England 2–1. However, they lost 5–2 against hosts France in the quarter-finals.

Also during Euro 2016, Iceland's fans became widely known for their 'volcano clap' (or 'Viking clap') with a 'huh' chant, though it may actually have originated with fans of Scottish club Motherwell F.C.

== Overall record ==
UEFA European Championship record
Year	Round	Position	Pld	W	D*	L	GF	GA
(France) 1960	Did not enter							
(Spain) 1964	Did not qualify							
(Italy) 1968	Did not enter							
(Belgium) 1972	Did not enter							
(Socialist Federal Republic of Yugoslavia) 1976	Did not qualify							
(Italy) 1980	Did not qualify							
(France) 1984	Did not qualify							
(West Germany) 1988	Did not qualify							
(Sweden) 1992	Did not qualify							
(England) 1996	Did not qualify							
(Belgium) (Netherlands) 2000	Did not qualify							
(Portugal) 2004	Did not qualify							
(Austria) (Switzerland) 2008	Did not qualify							
(Poland) (Ukraine) 2012	Did not qualify							
(France) 2016	Quarter-finals	8th	5	2	2	1	8	9
(Europe) 2020	Did not qualify							
(Germany) 2024	Did not qualify							
(Republic of Ireland) (United Kingdom) 2028	To be determined							
(Italy) (Turkey) 2032	To be determined							
Total	Quarter-finals	1/17	5	2	2	1	8	9

List of UEFA European Championship matches
Year	Round	Opponent	Score	Result	Date	Venue
2016	Group F	Portugal	1–1	Draw	14 June 2016	Saint-Étienne, France
2016	Group F	Hungary	1–1	Draw	18 June 2016	Marseille, France
2016	Group F	Austria	2–1	Win	22 June 2016	Paris, France
2016	Round of 16	England	2–1	Win	27 June 2016	Nice, France
2016	Quarter-finals	France	2–5	Loss	3 July 2016	Paris, France

== Euro 2016 squad ==
Iceland announced their final squad on 9 May.

Managers: Heimir Hallgrímsson & (Sweden) Lars Lagerbäck

No.	Pos.	Player	Date of birth (age)	Caps	Goals	Club
1	GK	Hannes Þór Halldórsson	27 April 1984 (aged 32)	33	0	(Norway) Bodø/Glimt
2	DF	Birkir Már Sævarsson	11 November 1984 (aged 31)	57	1	(Sweden) Hammarby IF
3	DF	Haukur Heiðar Hauksson	1 September 1991 (aged 24)	7	0	(Sweden) AIK
4	DF	Hjörtur Hermannsson	8 February 1995 (aged 21)	3	0	(Sweden) IFK Göteborg
5	DF	Sverrir Ingi Ingason	5 August 1993 (aged 22)	6	2	(Belgium) Lokeren
6	DF	Ragnar Sigurðsson	19 June 1986 (aged 29)	56	1	(Russia) Krasnodar
7	MF	Jóhann Berg Guðmundsson	27 October 1990 (aged 25)	47	5	(England) Charlton Athletic
8	MF	Birkir Bjarnason	27 May 1988 (aged 28)	47	6	(Switzerland) Basel
9	FW	Kolbeinn Sigþórsson	14 March 1990 (aged 26)	39	20	(France) Nantes
10	MF	Gylfi Sigurðsson	8 September 1989 (aged 26)	39	13	(Wales) Swansea City
11	FW	Alfreð Finnbogason	1 February 1989 (aged 27)	34	8	(Germany) FC Augsburg
12	GK	Ögmundur Kristinsson	19 June 1989 (aged 26)	11	0	(Sweden) Hammarby IF
13	GK	Ingvar Jónsson	18 October 1989 (aged 26)	5	0	(Norway) Sandefjord
14	DF	Kári Árnason	13 October 1982 (aged 33)	47	2	(Sweden) Malmö FF
15	FW	Jón Daði Böðvarsson	25 May 1992 (aged 24)	21	1	(Germany) 1. FC Kaiserslautern
16	MF	Rúnar Már Sigurjónsson	18 June 1990 (aged 25)	11	1	(Sweden) GIF Sundsvall
17	MF	Aron Gunnarsson (captain)	22 April 1989 (aged 27)	59	2	(Wales) Cardiff City
18	MF	Theódór Elmar Bjarnason	4 March 1987 (aged 29)	27	0	(Denmark) AGF
19	DF	Hörður Björgvin Magnússon	11 February 1993 (aged 23)	5	0	(Italy) Cesena
20	MF	Emil Hallfreðsson	29 June 1984 (aged 31)	54	1	(Italy) Udinese
21	MF	Arnór Ingvi Traustason	30 April 1993 (aged 23)	7	3	(Sweden) IFK Norrköping
22	FW	Eiður Guðjohnsen	15 September 1978 (aged 37)	86	26	(Norway) Molde FK
23	DF	Ari Freyr Skúlason	14 May 1987 (aged 29)	38	0	(Denmark) OB

== Goalscorers ==
Player	Goals	2016
Birkir Bjarnason	2	2
Kolbeinn Sigþórsson	2	2
Jón Daði Böðvarsson	1	1
Gylfi Sigurðsson	1	1
Ragnar Sigurðsson	1	1
Arnór Ingvi Traustason	1	1
Total	8	8

== See also ==
- Iceland at the FIFA World Cup

== Head-to-head record ==
Opponent	Pld	W	D	L	GF	GA	GD	Win %
Austria	1	1	0	0	2	1	+1	100.00
England	1	1	0	0	2	1	+1	100.00
France	1	0	0	1	2	5	−3	0.00
Hungary	1	0	1	0	1	1	+0	0.00
Portugal	1	0	1	0	1	1	+0	0.00
Total	5	2	2	1	8	9	−1	40.00
