= 2018 FIFA World Cup Group D =

International football tournament

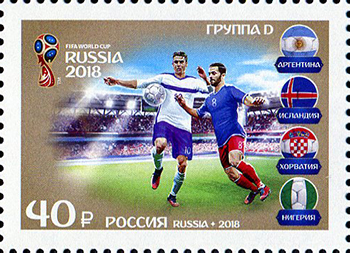
2018 postage stamp from Russia depicting Group D of the 2018 FIFA World Cup group stage.

Group D of the 2018 FIFA World Cup took place from 16 to 26 June 2018. The group consisted of Argentina, Iceland, Croatia, and Nigeria. The top two teams, Croatia and Argentina, advanced to the round of 16.

== Teams ==
Draw position	Team	Pot	Confederation	Method of qualification	Date of qualification	Finals appearance	Last appearance	Previous best performance	FIFA Rankings	
Draw position	Team	Pot	Confederation	Method of qualification	Date of qualification	Finals appearance	Last appearance	Previous best performance	October 2017 (Note: The rankings of October 2017 were used for seeding for the final draw.)	June 2018
D1	Argentina	1	CONMEBOL	CONMEBOL Round Robin third place	10 October 2017	17th	2014 (runners-up)	Winners (1978, 1986)	4	5
D2	Iceland	3	UEFA	UEFA Group I winners	9 October 2017	1st	–	–	21	22
D3	Croatia	2	UEFA	UEFA second round winners	12 November 2017	5th	2014 (group stage)	Third place (1998)	18	20
D4	Nigeria	4	CAF	CAF third round Group B winners	7 October 2017	6th	2014 (round of 16)	Round of 16 (1994, 1998, 2014)	41	48

== Standings ==
Pos	Team	Pld	W	D	L	GF	GA	GD	Pts	Qualification
1	Croatia	3	3	0	0	7	1	+6	9	Advance to knockout stage
2	Argentina	3	1	1	1	3	5	−2	4	Advance to knockout stage
3	Nigeria	3	1	0	2	3	4	−1	3	
4	Iceland	3	0	1	2	2	5	−3	1	

Source: FIFA
Rules for classification: Group stage tiebreakers

In the round of 16:

- The winners of Group D, Croatia, advanced to play the runners-up of Group C, Denmark.
- The runners-up of Group D, Argentina, advanced to play the winners of Group C, France.

== Matches ==
All times listed are local time.

=== Argentina vs Iceland ===
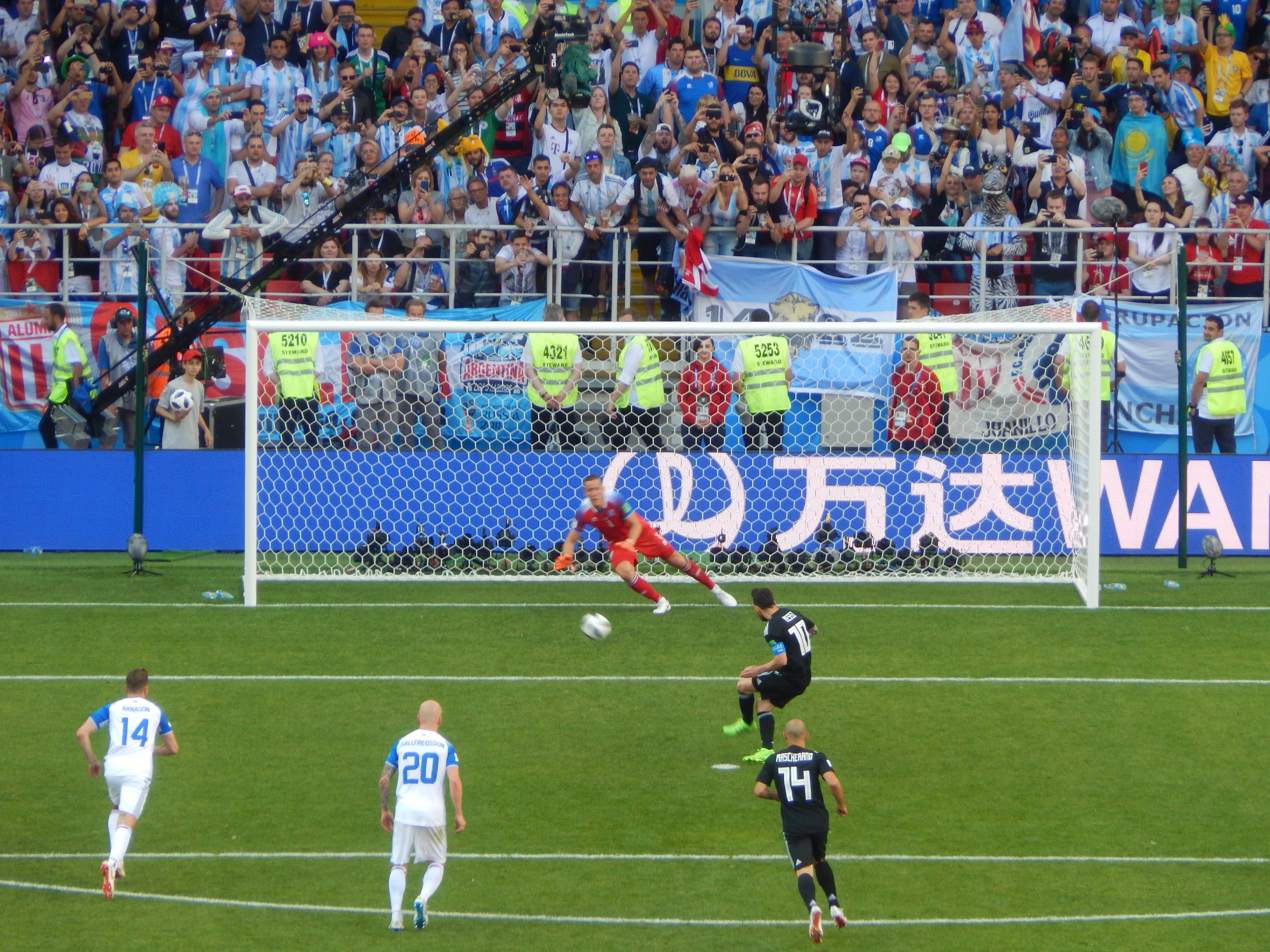
Lionel Messi's penalty kick is saved by Hörður Björgvin Magnússon.

The two teams had never met before.

Despite stamping their authority on the game's opening stages, Argentina struggled to find space against the Icelandic defence. Argentina then scored in the 19th minute, Sergio Agüero scoring with a powerful left foot shot to the top left corner of the net giving them a 1–0 lead. Alfreð Finnbogason made history by scoring his country's first World Cup goal just four minutes later when he slotted to the net from six yards out after the ball broke to him from six yards out. Argentina then had the chance to go ahead again when Hörður Björgvin Magnússon pushed Maximiliano Meza inside the box after 64 minutes. Hannes Þór Halldórsson dove to his right to deny Lionel Messi a goal. Although Argentina continued to press for a goal, but they were repeatedly denied by the Icelandics' defense.

Argentina failed to win their opening match at a World Cup tournament for the first time since losing to Cameroon in 1990, and it was the first time that they drew their opener in the competition. Argentina have missed their last two penalties taken at a World Cup finals (excluding shoot-outs), with Ariel Ortega failing to convert against Sweden in 2002 before Messi's effort against Iceland in 2018. The Iceland forward's goal after 23 minutes was the earliest scored for a nation playing in their first World Cup match since Rashidi Yekini netted after 21 minutes for Nigeria against Bulgaria on 21 June 1994.

16 June 2018
16:00 MSK (UTC+3)

Argentina	1–1	Iceland
Agüero 19'		Finnbogason 23'

Otkritie Arena, Moscow
Attendance: 44,190
Referee: Szymon Marciniak (Poland)

Argentina	Iceland

GK	23	Willy Caballero
RB	18	Eduardo Salvio
CB	17	Nicolás Otamendi
CB	16	Marcos Rojo
LB	3	Nicolás Tagliafico
CM	14	Javier Mascherano
CM	5	Lucas Biglia	(substituted off) 54'
RW	13	Maximiliano Meza	(substituted off) 84'
AM	10	Lionel Messi (c)
LW	11	Ángel Di María	(substituted off) 75'
CF	19	Sergio Agüero
Substitutions:
MF	7	Éver Banega	(substituted on) 54'
MF	22	Cristian Pavón	(substituted on) 75'
FW	9	Gonzalo Higuaín	(substituted on) 84'
Manager:
Jorge Sampaoli

GK	1	Hannes Þór Halldórsson
RB	2	Birkir Már Sævarsson
CB	14	Kári Árnason
CB	6	Ragnar Sigurðsson
LB	18	Hörður Björgvin Magnússon
DM	10	Gylfi Sigurðsson
CM	17	Aron Gunnarsson (c)	(substituted off) 76'
CM	20	Emil Hallfreðsson
RW	7	Jóhann Berg Guðmundsson	(substituted off) 63'
LW	8	Birkir Bjarnason
CF	11	Alfreð Finnbogason	(substituted off) 89'
Substitutions:
MF	19	Rúrik Gíslason	(substituted on) 63'
DF	23	Ari Freyr Skúlason	(substituted on) 76'
FW	9	Björn Bergmann Sigurðarson	(substituted on) 89'
Manager:
Heimir Hallgrímsson

Man of the Match:
Hannes Þór Halldórsson (Iceland)

Assistant referees:
Paweł Sokolnicki (Poland)
Tomasz Listkiewicz (Poland)
Fourth official:
Wilmar Roldán (Colombia)
Reserve assistant referee:
Alexander Guzmán (Colombia)
Video assistant referee:
Mark Geiger (United States)
Assistant video assistant referees:
Paweł Gil (Poland)
Joe Fletcher (Canada)
Gery Vargas (Bolivia)

=== Croatia vs Nigeria ===
The two teams had never met before.

Ivan Perišić went closest to hitting the target with an effort from 20 metres after a quarter of an hour, but in the end it was Nigeria midfielder Peter Etebo who brought joy to the huge Croatian contingent in Kaliningrad, beating his own goalkeeper with the ball going into the left corner of the net following a Luka Modrić corner from the right which had been deflected off Perišić and Mario Mandžukić. Alex Iwobi, after wriggling into space on the left side of the box, he hit a shot directly into a Croatia defender. Ante Rebić fired over from Perišić's left-wing centre, with Odion Ighalo's header recording the match's first shot on target in the 59th minute. William Troost-Ekong was penalised for holding Mandžukić in the penalty area, and Modrić sent Francis Uzoho the wrong way from 12 yards for his first World Cup goal, shooting low to the left corner.

Croatia have won their opening game of a World Cup for the first time since their debut in the competition in 1998 (3–1 vs Jamaica). Nigeria became the first team in World Cup history to concede two consecutive own goals in the competition, with their last goal shipped in 2014, against France in the last 16, also coming in this manner.

16 June 2018
21:00 KALT (UTC+2)

Croatia	2–0	Nigeria
Etebo 32' (o.g.); Modrić 71' (pen.)

Kaliningrad Stadium, Kaliningrad
Attendance: 31,136
Referee: Sandro Ricci (Brazil)

Croatia	Nigeria

GK	23	Danijel Subašić
RB	2	Šime Vrsaljko
CB	21	Domagoj Vida
CB	6	Dejan Lovren
LB	3	Ivan Strinić
CM	7	Ivan Rakitić	(yellow card) 30'
CM	10	Luka Modrić (c)
RW	18	Ante Rebić		(substituted off) 78'
AM	9	Andrej Kramarić		(substituted off) 60'
LW	4	Ivan Perišić
CF	17	Mario Mandžukić		(substituted off) 86'
Substitutions:
MF	11	Marcelo Brozović	(yellow card) 89'	(substituted on) 60'
MF	8	Mateo Kovačić		(substituted on) 78'
FW	20	Marko Pjaca		(substituted on) 86'
Manager:
Zlatko Dalić

GK	23	Francis Uzoho
RB	12	Shehu Abdullahi
CB	6	Leon Balogun
CB	5	William Troost-Ekong	(yellow card) 70'
LB	2	Brian Idowu
CM	4	Wilfred Ndidi
CM	8	Peter Etebo
RW	11	Victor Moses
AM	10	John Obi Mikel (c)		(substituted off) 88'
LW	18	Alex Iwobi		(substituted off) 62'
CF	9	Odion Ighalo		(substituted off) 72'
Substitutions:
FW	7	Ahmed Musa		(substituted on) 62'
FW	14	Kelechi Iheanacho		(substituted on) 72'
FW	13	Simy		(substituted on) 88'
Manager:
(Germany) Gernot Rohr

Man of the Match:
Luka Modrić (Croatia)

Assistant referees:
Emerson de Carvalho (Brazil)
Marcelo Van Gasse (Brazil)
Fourth official:
Antonio Mateu Lahoz (Spain)
Reserve assistant referee:
Pau Cebrián Devís (Spain)
Video assistant referee:
Daniele Orsato (Italy)
Assistant video assistant referees:
Wilton Sampaio (Brazil)
Carlos Astroza (Chile)
Artur Soares Dias (Portugal)

=== Argentina vs Croatia ===
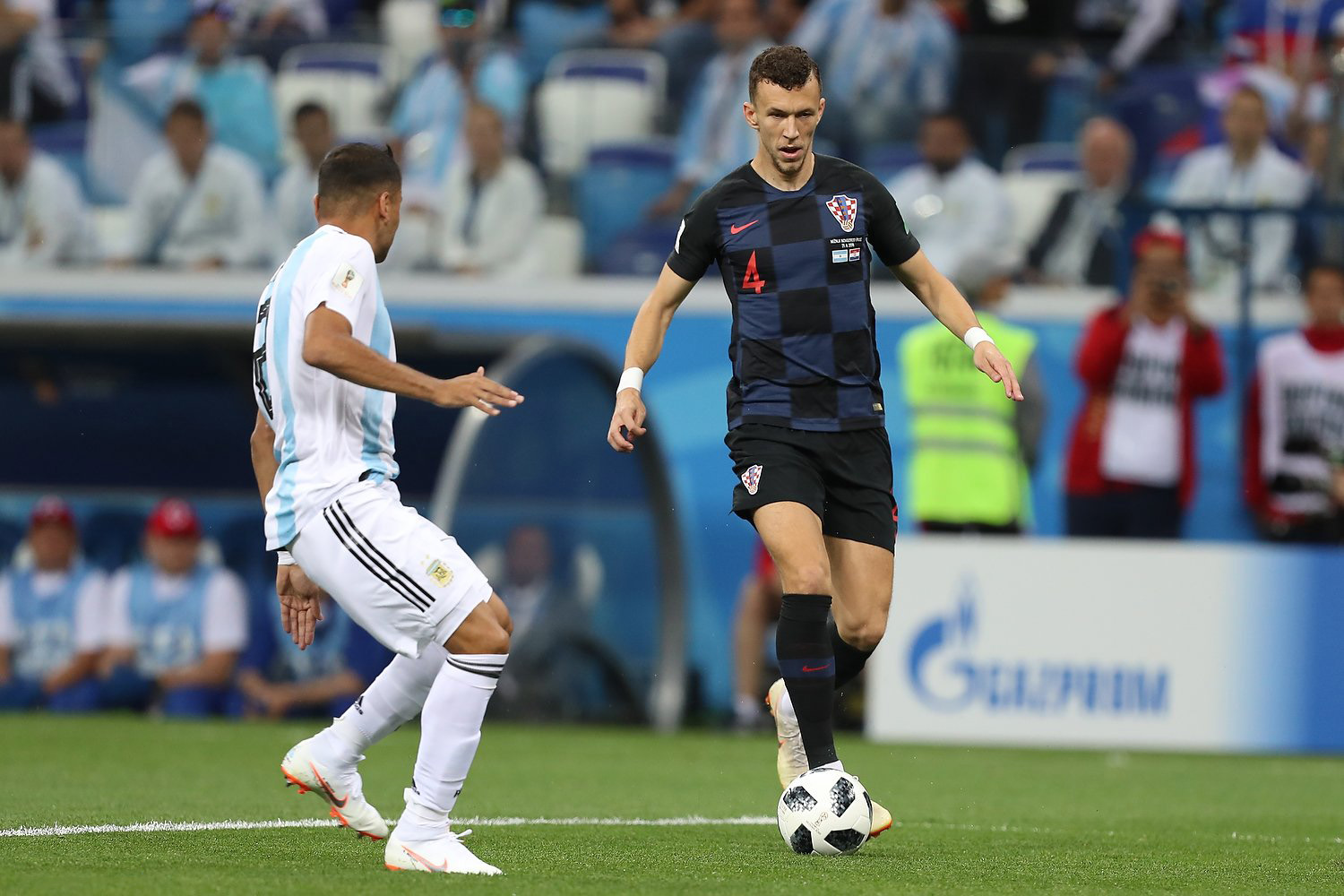
Ivan Perišić followed by Gabriel Mercado

The two teams had met in four matches, including one game at the 1998 FIFA World Cup, an Argentina 1–0 victory.

Ivan Perišić surged into space down the left and shot towards the bottom-right corner, which was tipped around the post by Willy Caballero. A Dejan Lovren block prevented Maximiliano Meza's low strike finding the net and then Marcos Acuña's cross clipped the top of Danijel Subašić's crossbar. Enzo Pérez struck wide from 15 yards. Three minutes later, Mario Mandžukić flashed a header wide of Caballero's right-hand post from six yards. Eight minutes into the second half, Ante Rebić shot a right foot volley past Caballero after the goalkeeper's mishit an attempted chip over his head. Subašić kept out Meza's close-range effort from substitute Gonzalo Higuaín's cutback. With ten minutes remaining Luka Modrić curled in from 20 yards with his right foot to the right corner of the net to score Croatia's second. Ivan Rakitić was fouled by Javier Mascherano – Nicolás Otamendi receiving a booking for appearing to kick the ball towards Rakitić's head as tempers flared – and crashed the resulting free-kick against the crossbar. Rakitić in the 91st minute, though, slotted home from the centre of the box after his initial shot deflected off Caballero and found Mateo Kovačić who passed it back to Rakitić from the left. With their second win in a row, Croatia advanced to the round of 16 for the first time since 1998, having been eliminated in 2002, 2006 and 2014 editions.

This was Croatia's first victory in five attempts against a South American team at the World Cup, having lost the previous four. This was Argentina's heaviest defeat in the first-round group stage of a World Cup since losing 6–1 to Czechoslovakia in 1958. Argentina failed to win either of their opening two group stage matches for the first time since 1974.

21 June 2018
21:00 MSK (UTC+3)

Argentina	0–3	Croatia
		Rebić 53'; Modrić 80'; Rakitić 90+1'

Nizhny Novgorod Stadium, Nizhny Novgorod
Attendance: 43,319
Referee: Ravshan Irmatov (Uzbekistan)

Argentina	Croatia

GK	23	Willy Caballero
CB	2	Gabriel Mercado	(yellow card) 51'
CB	17	Nicolás Otamendi	(yellow card) 85'
CB	3	Nicolás Tagliafico
RM	18	Eduardo Salvio		(substituted off) 56'
CM	14	Javier Mascherano
CM	15	Enzo Pérez		(substituted off) 68'
LM	8	Marcos Acuña	(yellow card) 87'
RF	10	Lionel Messi (c)
CF	19	Sergio Agüero		(substituted off) 54'
LF	13	Maximiliano Meza
Substitutions:
FW	9	Gonzalo Higuaín		(substituted on) 54'
MF	22	Cristian Pavón		(substituted on) 56'
FW	21	Paulo Dybala		(substituted on) 68'
Manager:
Jorge Sampaoli

GK	23	Danijel Subašić
RB	2	Šime Vrsaljko	(yellow card) 67'
CB	6	Dejan Lovren
CB	21	Domagoj Vida
LB	3	Ivan Strinić
CM	7	Ivan Rakitić
CM	11	Marcelo Brozović
RW	18	Ante Rebić	(yellow card) 39'	(substituted off) 57'
AM	10	Luka Modrić (c)
LW	4	Ivan Perišić		(substituted off) 82'
CF	17	Mario Mandžukić	(yellow card) 58'	(substituted off) 90+3'
Substitutions:
FW	9	Andrej Kramarić		(substituted on) 57'
MF	8	Mateo Kovačić		(substituted on) 82'
DF	5	Vedran Ćorluka	(yellow card) 90+4'	(substituted on) 90+3'
Manager:
Zlatko Dalić

Man of the Match:
Luka Modrić (Croatia)

Assistant referees:
Abdukhamidullo Rasulov (Uzbekistan)
Jakhongir Saidov (Uzbekistan)
Fourth official:
Norbert Hauata (Tahiti)
Reserve assistant referee:
Bertrand Brial (New Caledonia)
Video assistant referee:
Felix Zwayer (Germany)
Assistant video assistant referees:
Bastian Dankert (Germany)
Corey Rockwell (United States)
Danny Makkelie (Netherlands)

=== Nigeria vs Iceland ===
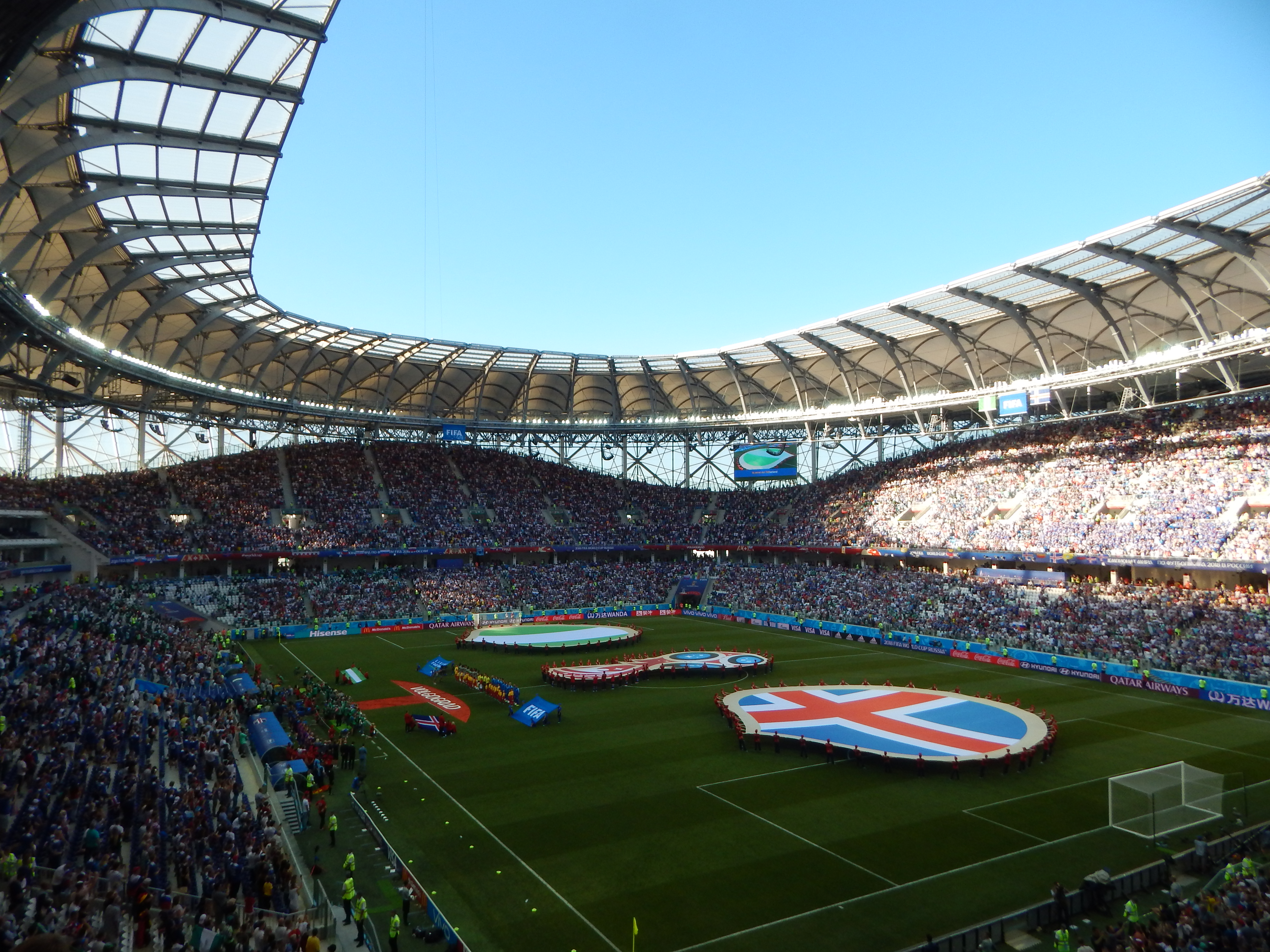
Pre-match

The two teams had met only once, in a friendly game in 1981, won by Iceland 3–0.

Gylfi Sigurðsson shot a sixth-minute chance straight at Francis Uzoho. In the last minute of the first half, Alfreð Finnbogason was unable to get a decisive touch on Sigurðsson's free-kick delivered from the right wing. In the 49th minute, Victor Moses' cross was collected by Ahmed Musa, who first controlled it in the air with his right foot before scoring on the half-volley powerfully to the net. Hannes Þór Halldórsson tipped over a deflected drive from Wilfred Ndidi. In the 75th minute, fed by Kenneth Omeruo, Musa burst clear in the left channel, cut inside and rounded Halldórsson before scoring with his right foot. A late VAR review spotted that substitute Tyronne Ebuehi had tripped Finnbogason, with Sigurðsson's spot-kick effort clearing the crossbar.

Iceland are the third World Cup debutants from Europe to have faced Nigeria at the tournament, and on every occasion Nigeria have emerged victorious, following victories against Greece (2–0) in 1994 and Bosnia and Herzegovina (1–0) in 2014. Uzoho is the second youngest goalkeeper to keep a clean sheet in a World Cup match (19 years, 237 days), behind only Li Chan-myung in North Korea's 1–0 win over Italy in July 1966 (19 years, 198 days). This is Nigeria's first victory in a World Cup game by a margin of more than one goal since they beat Greece 2–0 in 1994 at their first World Cup tournament. This was Iceland's first group stage's defeat in any big tournament.

22 June 2018
18:00 MSK (UTC+3)

Nigeria	2–0	Iceland
Musa 49', 75'

Volgograd Arena, Volgograd
Attendance: 40,904
Referee: Matthew Conger (New Zealand)

Nigeria	Iceland

GK	23	Francis Uzoho
CB	22	Kenneth Omeruo
CB	5	William Troost-Ekong
CB	6	Leon Balogun
DM	10	John Obi Mikel (c)
CM	8	Peter Etebo		(substituted off) 90'
CM	4	Wilfred Ndidi
RW	11	Victor Moses
LW	2	Brian Idowu	(yellow card) 44'	(substituted off) 46'
CF	7	Ahmed Musa
CF	14	Kelechi Iheanacho		(substituted off) 85'
Substitutions:
DF	21	Tyronne Ebuehi		(substituted on) 46'
FW	9	Odion Ighalo		(substituted on) 85'
FW	18	Alex Iwobi		(substituted on) 90'
Manager:
(Germany) Gernot Rohr

GK	1	Hannes Þór Halldórsson
RB	2	Birkir Már Sævarsson
CB	14	Kári Árnason
CB	6	Ragnar Sigurðsson	(substituted off) 65'
LB	18	Hörður Björgvin Magnússon
RM	19	Rúrik Gíslason
CM	17	Aron Gunnarsson (c)	(substituted off) 87'
CM	10	Gylfi Sigurðsson
LM	8	Birkir Bjarnason
CF	22	Jón Daði Böðvarsson	(substituted off) 71'
CF	11	Alfreð Finnbogason
Substitutions:
DF	5	Sverrir Ingi Ingason	(substituted on) 65'
FW	9	Björn Bergmann Sigurðarson	(substituted on) 71'
DF	23	Ari Freyr Skúlason	(substituted on) 87'
Manager:
Heimir Hallgrímsson

Man of the Match:
Ahmed Musa (Nigeria)

Assistant referees:
Simon Lount (New Zealand)
Tevita Makasini (Tonga)
Fourth official:
Ricardo Montero (Costa Rica)
Reserve assistant referee:
Hiroshi Yamauchi (Japan)
Video assistant referee:
Massimiliano Irrati (Italy)
Assistant video assistant referees:
Paweł Gil (Poland)
Elenito Di Liberatore (Italy)
Gianluca Rocchi (Italy)

=== Nigeria vs Argentina ===
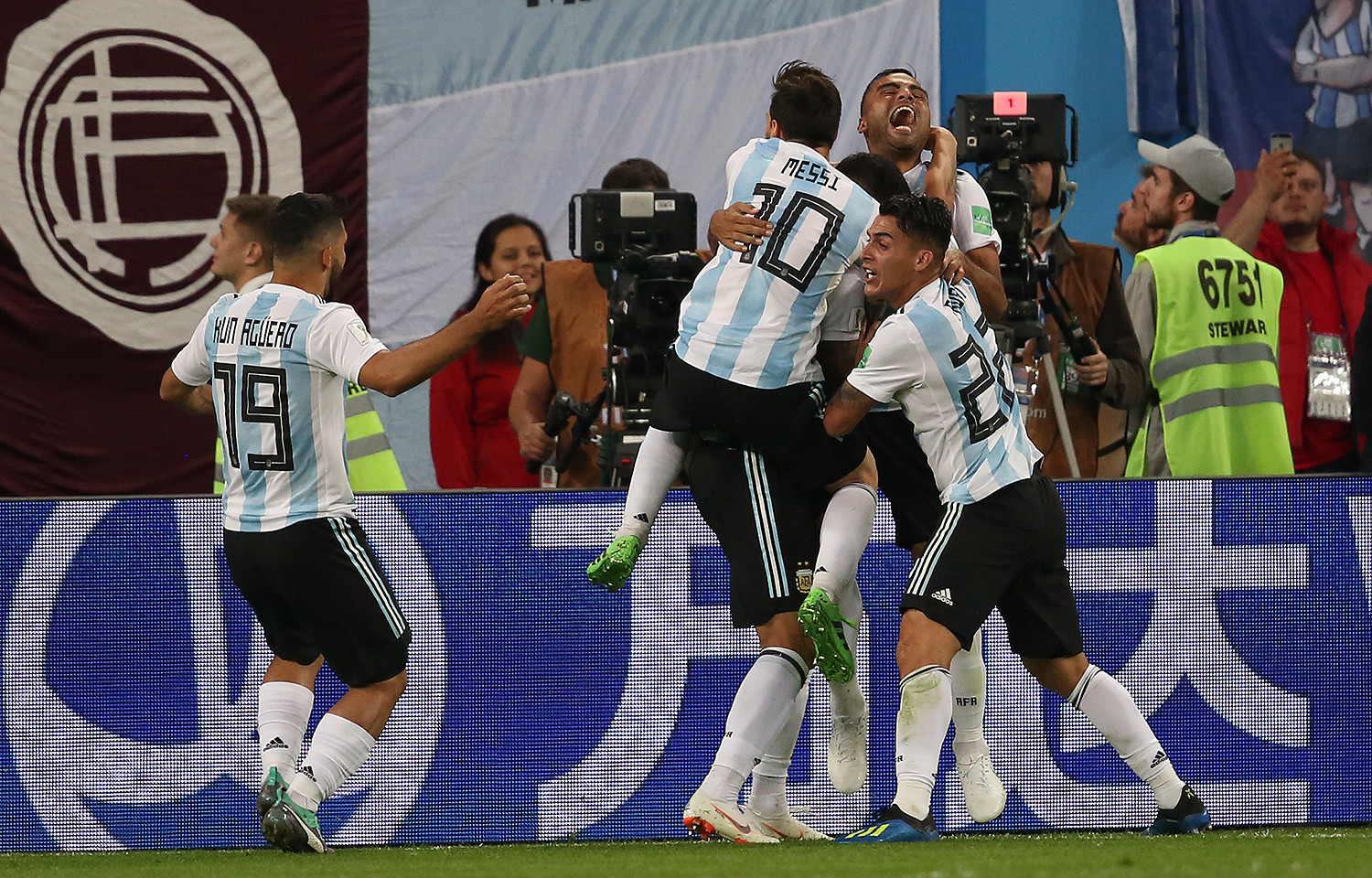
The Argentines celebrating Rojo's goal

The two teams had met in eight matches, including four games at FIFA World Cup group stages, in 1994, 2002, 2010 and 2014, all won by Argentina.

Ahmed Musa narrowly cleared the crossbar in the early minutes of the game. In the 14th minute, Lionel Messi controlled the ball from a pass over the top from Éver Banega on his thigh and his left boot before shooting a right-footed drive past Francis Uzoho from the right. Leon Balogun brought Ángel Di María down 25 yards from goal, but Uzoho tipped Messi's free kick to his left-hand post. In the second half, Leon Balogun was held in the penalty area by Javier Mascherano after a corner form the left, and Victor Moses scored from the resulting penalty to equalize for Nigeria, shooting low to the right with the goalkeeper diving the other way. After a series of defensive fouls in each penalty area that went uncalled despite a VAR check for a handball by Marcos Rojo, Peter Etebo narrowly missed from a long-range free kick. Gabriel Mercado raided down the right and bent a cross into the penalty area, with Rojo, who scored the decisive goal against Nigeria four years ago in Brazil, once again converting, as he tucked home a low right-footed volley to give Argentina the win and see them advance to the knockout stage.

Messi's strike brought up the century for goals at Russia 2018. He also joined Diego Maradona and Gabriel Batistuta in becoming the third Argentina player to score in three World Cups.

26 June 2018
21:00 MSK (UTC+3)

Nigeria	1–2	Argentina
Moses 51' (pen.)		Messi 14'; Rojo 86'

Krestovsky Stadium, Saint Petersburg
Attendance: 64,468
Referee: Cüneyt Çakır (Turkey)

Nigeria	Argentina

GK	23	Francis Uzoho
CB	6	Leon Balogun	(yellow card) 32'
CB	5	William Troost-Ekong
CB	22	Kenneth Omeruo		(substituted off) 90'
DM	10	John Obi Mikel (c)	(yellow card) 90+1'
CM	8	Peter Etebo
CM	4	Wilfred Ndidi
RW	11	Victor Moses
LW	2	Brian Idowu
CF	7	Ahmed Musa		(substituted off) 90+2'
CF	14	Kelechi Iheanacho		(substituted off) 46'
Substitutions:
FW	9	Odion Ighalo		(substituted on) 46'
FW	18	Alex Iwobi		(substituted on) 90'
FW	13	Simy		(substituted on) 90+2'
Manager:
(Germany) Gernot Rohr

GK	12	Franco Armani
RB	2	Gabriel Mercado
CB	17	Nicolás Otamendi
CB	16	Marcos Rojo
LB	3	Nicolás Tagliafico		(substituted off) 80'
RM	15	Enzo Pérez		(substituted off) 61'
CM	14	Javier Mascherano	(yellow card) 49'
CM	7	Éver Banega	(yellow card) 64'
LM	11	Ángel Di María		(substituted off) 72'
CF	10	Lionel Messi (c)	(yellow card) 90+4'
CF	9	Gonzalo Higuaín
Substitutions:
MF	22	Cristian Pavón		(substituted on) 61'
MF	13	Maximiliano Meza		(substituted on) 72'
FW	19	Sergio Agüero		(substituted on) 80'
Manager:
Jorge Sampaoli

Man of the Match:
Lionel Messi (Argentina)

Assistant referees:
Bahattin Duran (Turkey)
Tarık Ongun (Turkey)
Fourth official:
Björn Kuipers (Netherlands)
Reserve assistant referee:
Sander van Roekel (Netherlands)
Video assistant referee:
Daniele Orsato (Italy)
Assistant video assistant referees:
Paweł Gil (Poland)
Paweł Sokolnicki (Poland)
Massimiliano Irrati (Italy)

=== Iceland vs Croatia ===
The two teams had met in six matches, most recently in 2017 for the 2018 FIFA World Cup qualification, which ended in a 1–0 Iceland victory.

Hörður Magnússon headed wide from Jóhann Guðmundsson's outswinging corner. Alfreð Finnbogason shot wide from the edge of the area. Birkir Bjarnason pounced from a corner, but Lovre Kalinić made a save from Aron Gunnarsson's curling effort. At the restart, Milan Badelj's strike clattered off the crossbar. Badelj got his goal when he reacted to a loose ball in the Iceland box and hammered home from close range. Sverrir Ingason's header rebounded back off the bar. Dejan Lovren's handball though enabled Gylfi Sigurðsson to score from the spot in the 76th minute. Badelj provided a throughball and, having outpaced his marker, Ivan Perišić lashed home to score the winner.

Croatia topped a world finals group for the first time in their history, and because of Croatia's victory, Argentina also qualified. With the defeat, Iceland stood bottom in the group with a single point and were eliminated.

26 June 2018
21:00 MSK (UTC+3)

Iceland	1–2	Croatia
Sigurðsson 76' (pen.)		Badelj 53'; Perišić 90'

Rostov Arena, Rostov-on-Don
Attendance: 43,472
Referee: Antonio Mateu Lahoz (Spain)

Iceland	Croatia

GK	1	Hannes Þór Halldórsson
RB	2	Birkir Már Sævarsson	(yellow card) 84'
CB	5	Sverrir Ingi Ingason
CB	6	Ragnar Sigurðsson		(substituted off) 70'
LB	18	Hörður Björgvin Magnússon
CM	17	Aron Gunnarsson (c)
CM	20	Emil Hallfreðsson	(yellow card) 59'
RW	7	Jóhann Berg Guðmundsson
AM	10	Gylfi Sigurðsson
LW	8	Birkir Bjarnason		(substituted off) 90'
CF	11	Alfreð Finnbogason	(yellow card) 64'	(substituted off) 85'
Substitutions:
FW	9	Björn Bergmann Sigurðarson		(substituted on) 70'
MF	4	Albert Guðmundsson		(substituted on) 85'
MF	21	Arnór Ingvi Traustason		(substituted on) 90'
Manager:
Heimir Hallgrímsson

GK	12	Lovre Kalinić
RB	13	Tin Jedvaj	(yellow card) 83'
CB	5	Vedran Ćorluka
CB	15	Duje Ćaleta-Car
LB	22	Josip Pivarić
CM	10	Luka Modrić (c)		(substituted off) 65'
CM	19	Milan Badelj
RW	20	Marko Pjaca	(yellow card) 14'	(substituted off) 70'
AM	8	Mateo Kovačić		(substituted off) 81'
LW	4	Ivan Perišić
CF	9	Andrej Kramarić
Substitutions:
MF	14	Filip Bradarić		(substituted on) 65'
DF	6	Dejan Lovren		(substituted on) 70'
MF	7	Ivan Rakitić		(substituted on) 81'
Manager:
Zlatko Dalić

Man of the Match:
Milan Badelj (Croatia)

Assistant referees:
Pau Cebrián Devís (Spain)
Roberto Díaz Pérez (Spain)
Fourth official:
John Pitti (Panama)
Reserve assistant referee:
Gabriel Victoria (Panama)
Video assistant referee:
Paolo Valeri (Italy)
Assistant video assistant referees:
Gery Vargas (Bolivia)
Elenito Di Liberatore (Italy)
Felix Zwayer (Germany)

== Discipline ==
Fair play points would have been used as tiebreakers if the overall and head-to-head records of teams were tied. These were calculated based on yellow and red cards received in all group matches as follows:

- first yellow card: minus 1 point;
- indirect red card (second yellow card): minus 3 points;
- direct red card: minus 4 points;
- yellow card and direct red card: minus 5 points;

Only one of the above deductions were applied to a player in a single match.

Team	Match 1				Match 2				Match 3				Points
Team	Booked	(yellow card) (yellow-red card)	Sent off (straight red)	(yellow card) (red card)	Booked	(yellow card) (yellow-red card)	Sent off (straight red)	(yellow card) (red card)	Booked	(yellow card) (yellow-red card)	Sent off (straight red)	(yellow card) (red card)	Points
Iceland									3				−3
Nigeria	1				1				2				−4
Argentina					3				3				−6
Croatia	2				4				2				−8

== See also ==
- Argentina at the FIFA World Cup
- Croatia at the FIFA World Cup
- Iceland at the FIFA World Cup
- Nigeria at the FIFA World Cup
