= UEFA Euro 2016 Group F =

Football tournament group stage

Group F of UEFA Euro 2016 contained the eventual champions Portugal, Iceland, Austria, and Hungary. It was Iceland's first appearance at the finals. Matches were played from 14 to 22 June 2016.

== Teams ==
Draw position	Team	Pot	Method of qualification	Date of qualification	Finals appearance	Last appearance	Previous best performance	UEFA Rankings October 2015 (Note: The UEFA rankings of October 2015 were used for seeding for the final draw.)	FIFA Rankings June 2016
F1	Portugal	1	Group I winner	8 October 2015	7th	2012	Runners-up (2004)	4	8
F2	Iceland	4	Group A runner-up	6 September 2015	1st	—	Debut	27	34
F3	Austria	2	Group G winner	8 September 2015	2nd	2008	Group stage (2008)	11	10
F4	Hungary	3	Play-off winner	15 November 2015	3rd	1972	Third place (1964)	20	20

== Standings ==
Pos	Team	Pld	W	D	L	GF	GA	GD	Pts	Qualification
1	Hungary	3	1	2	0	6	4	+2	5 (Note: Tied on head-to-head result (Iceland 1–1 Hungary). Overall goal difference was used as the tiebreaker.)	Advance to knockout stage
2	Iceland	3	1	2	0	4	3	+1	5	Advance to knockout stage
3	Portugal	3	0	3	0	4	4	0	3	Advance to knockout stage
4	Austria	3	0	1	2	1	4	−3	1	

Source: UEFA
Rules for classification: Group stage tiebreakers
Notes:

In the round of 16,

- The winner of Group F, Hungary, advanced to play the runner-up of Group E, Belgium.
- The runner-up of Group F, Iceland, advanced to play the runner-up of Group B, England.
- The third-placed team of Group F, Portugal, advanced as one of the four best third-placed teams to play the winner of Group D, Croatia.

== Matches ==
=== Austria vs Hungary ===
14 June 2016
18:00

Austria	0–2	Hungary
	Report	Szalai 62'; Stieber 87'

Stade de Bordeaux, Bordeaux
Attendance: 34,424
Referee: Clément Turpin (France)

Austria	Hungary

GK	1	Robert Almer
RB	17	Florian Klein
CB	3	Aleksandar Dragović	(yellow card) 33' (yellow-red card) 66'
CB	4	Martin Hinteregger
LB	5	Christian Fuchs (c)
RM	11	Martin Harnik		(substituted off) 77'
CM	14	Julian Baumgartlinger
CM	8	David Alaba
LM	7	Marko Arnautović
SS	10	Zlatko Junuzović		(substituted off) 59'
CF	21	Marc Janko		(substituted off) 65'
Substitutions:
MF	20	Marcel Sabitzer		(substituted on) 59'
FW	9	Rubin Okotie		(substituted on) 65'
MF	18	Alessandro Schöpf		(substituted on) 77'
Manager:
(Switzerland) Marcel Koller

GK	1	Gábor Király
RB	5	Attila Fiola
CB	20	Richárd Guzmics
CB	2	Ádám Lang
LB	4	Tamás Kádár
DM	10	Zoltán Gera
RM	11	Krisztián Németh	(yellow card) 80'	(substituted off) 89'
CM	8	Ádám Nagy
CM	15	László Kleinheisler		(substituted off) 79'
LM	7	Balázs Dzsudzsák (c)
CF	9	Ádám Szalai		(substituted off) 69'
Substitutions:
FW	19	Tamás Priskin		(substituted on) 69'
MF	18	Zoltán Stieber		(substituted on) 79'
DF	16	Ádám Pintér		(substituted on) 89'
Manager:
(Germany) Bernd Storck

Man of the Match:
László Kleinheisler (Hungary)

Assistant referees:
Frédéric Cano (France)
Nicolas Danos (France)
Fourth official:
Jesús Gil Manzano (Spain)
Additional assistant referees:
Benoît Bastien (France)
Fredy Fautrel (France)
Reserve assistant referee:
Roberto Alonso Fernández (Spain)

=== Portugal vs Iceland ===
Iceland had the chance for an early breakthrough when Gylfi Sigurðsson had a sight of goal but could not break the deadlock by beating the Portuguese goalkeeper Rui Patrício. Portugal started to seize control as the half wore on, though, and Vieirinha gave Hannes Þór Halldórsson some problems with a shot from distance on 18 minutes. Shortly afterwards, they could attained the lead as Cristiano Ronaldo crossed for Nani, but his header was saved at point-blank range. Ronaldo, who made his 127th appearance for Portugal, equalling Luís Figo as his nation's most capped player of all time, then missed a headed chance before just failing to make an impact from a cross, which was delivered by Pepe. They did not have to wait much longer for the breakthrough. With just over half an hour played, André Gomes was able to get down the right after some tactical build-up play before laying a low cross for Nani, who converted from close range to give Portugal a 1–0 lead at the break.

After the restart, Iceland drew level on 50 minutes. Jóhann Berg Guðmundsson sent in a cross from the right that found its way to Birkir Bjarnason, who swept the ball past Patrício. Portugal looked to reassert their possession but were struggling to make things happen, as when Ronaldo produced a skillful flick to spark a move on 56 minutes but was ultimately crowded out as he tried to engineer space for a shot. Renato Sanches made his competitive debut (making him the youngest Portuguese to appear in an international competition, breaking a record held by Cristiano Ronaldo for 12 years), replacing João Moutinho for the final 19 minutes of a 1–1 draw. Nani came close to adding his second goal on 71 minutes when he headed just wide of goal from Raphaël Guerreiro's direct free kick. Moreover, Ronaldo also fired just over as Portugal broke away on the counter, with Iceland continuing to pursue an ill-advised handball appeal at the other end. On 85 minutes, as Portugal were increasing the pressure, Ronaldo was presented with a cross at the back post by Nani; but his header was gathered by Halldórsson at the second attempt. Patrício pushed a shot from Finnbogasson up into the air and away, but Iceland were increasingly forced to cling on as the match drew to a conclusion. But they survived two Ronaldo free kicks in succession, deep into injury time, to come away with a valuable point.

14 June 2016
21:00

Portugal	1–1	Iceland
Nani 31'	Report	B. Bjarnason 50'

Stade Geoffroy-Guichard, Saint-Étienne
Attendance: 38,742
Referee: Cüneyt Çakır (Turkey)

Portugal	Iceland

GK	1	Rui Patrício
RB	11	Vieirinha
CB	6	Ricardo Carvalho
CB	3	Pepe
LB	5	Raphaël Guerreiro
CM	10	João Mário	(substituted off) 76'
CM	13	Danilo
CM	15	André Gomes	(substituted off) 84'
AM	8	João Moutinho	(substituted off) 71'
CF	17	Nani
CF	7	Cristiano Ronaldo (c)
Substitutions:
MF	16	Renato Sanches	(substituted on) 71'
FW	20	Ricardo Quaresma	(substituted on) 76'
FW	9	Éder	(substituted on) 84'
Manager:
Fernando Santos

GK	1	Hannes Þór Halldórsson
RB	2	Birkir Már Sævarsson
CB	6	Ragnar Sigurðsson
CB	14	Kári Árnason
LB	23	Ari Freyr Skúlason
RM	7	Jóhann Berg Guðmundsson		(substituted off) 90'
CM	17	Aron Gunnarsson (c)
CM	10	Gylfi Sigurðsson
LM	8	Birkir Bjarnason	(yellow card) 55'
CF	9	Kolbeinn Sigþórsson		(substituted off) 81'
CF	15	Jón Daði Böðvarsson
Substitutions:
FW	11	Alfreð Finnbogason	(yellow card) 90+4'	(substituted on) 81'
MF	18	Theódór Elmar Bjarnason		(substituted on) 90'
Managers:
Heimir Hallgrímsson (Sweden) Lars Lagerbäck

Man of the Match:
Nani (Portugal)

Assistant referees:
Bahattin Duran (Turkey)
Tarık Ongun (Turkey)
Fourth official:
Carlos del Cerro Grande (Spain)
Additional assistant referees:
Hüseyin Göçek (Turkey)
Barış Şimşek (Turkey)
Reserve assistant referee:
Juan Carlos Yuste Jiménez (Spain)

=== Iceland vs Hungary ===
18 June 2016
18:00

Iceland	1–1	Hungary
G. Sigurðsson 40' (pen.)	Report	Sævarsson 88' (o.g.)

Stade Vélodrome, Marseille
Attendance: 60,842
Referee: Sergei Karasev (Russia)

Iceland	Hungary

GK	1	Hannes Þór Halldórsson
RB	2	Birkir Már Sævarsson	(yellow card) 77'
CB	6	Ragnar Sigurðsson
CB	14	Kári Árnason
LB	23	Ari Freyr Skúlason
RM	7	Jóhann Berg Guðmundsson	(yellow card) 42'
CM	10	Gylfi Sigurðsson
CM	17	Aron Gunnarsson (c)		(substituted off) 65'
LM	8	Birkir Bjarnason
CF	9	Kolbeinn Sigþórsson		(substituted off) 84'
CF	15	Jón Daði Böðvarsson		(substituted off) 69'
Substitutions:
MF	20	Emil Hallfreðsson		(substituted on) 65'
FW	11	Alfreð Finnbogason	(yellow card) 75'	(substituted on) 69'
FW	22	Eiður Guðjohnsen		(substituted on) 84'
Managers:
Heimir Hallgrímsson (Sweden) Lars Lagerbäck

GK	1	Gábor Király
RB	2	Ádám Lang
CB	20	Richárd Guzmics
CB	23	Roland Juhász		(substituted off) 84'
LB	4	Tamás Kádár	(yellow card) 81'
CM	15	László Kleinheisler	(yellow card) 83'
CM	10	Zoltán Gera
CM	8	Ádám Nagy	(yellow card) 90+1'
RW	18	Zoltán Stieber		(substituted off) 66'
LW	7	Balázs Dzsudzsák (c)
CF	19	Tamás Priskin		(substituted off) 66'
Substitutions:
FW	17	Nemanja Nikolić		(substituted on) 66'
FW	13	Dániel Böde		(substituted on) 66'
FW	9	Ádám Szalai		(substituted on) 84'
Manager:
(Germany) Bernd Storck

Man of the Match:
Kolbeinn Sigþórsson (Iceland)

Assistant referees:
Nikolai Golubev (Russia)
Tikhon Kalugin (Russia)
Fourth official:
Aleksei Kulbakov (Belarus)
Additional assistant referees:
Sergey Lapochkin (Russia)
Sergey Ivanov (Russia)
Reserve assistant referee:
Vitali Maliutsin (Belarus)

=== Portugal vs Austria ===
18 June 2016
21:00

Portugal	0–0	Austria
	Report

Parc des Princes, Paris
Attendance: 44,291
Referee: Nicola Rizzoli (Italy)

Portugal	Austria

GK	1	Rui Patrício
RB	11	Vieirinha
CB	3	Pepe	(yellow card) 40'
CB	6	Ricardo Carvalho
LB	5	Raphaël Guerreiro
RM	20	Ricardo Quaresma	(yellow card) 31'	(substituted off) 71'
CM	14	William Carvalho
CM	8	João Moutinho
LM	15	André Gomes		(substituted off) 83'
CF	17	Nani		(substituted off) 89'
CF	7	Cristiano Ronaldo (c)
Substitutions:
MF	10	João Mário		(substituted on) 71'
FW	9	Éder		(substituted on) 83'
MF	18	Rafa Silva		(substituted on) 89'
Manager:
Fernando Santos

GK	1	Robert Almer
RB	17	Florian Klein
CB	15	Sebastian Prödl
CB	4	Martin Hinteregger	(yellow card) 78'
LB	5	Christian Fuchs (c)	(yellow card) 60'
CM	6	Stefan Ilsanker		(substituted off) 87'
CM	14	Julian Baumgartlinger
RW	11	Martin Harnik	(yellow card) 47'
AM	8	David Alaba		(substituted off) 65'
LW	7	Marko Arnautović
CF	20	Marcel Sabitzer		(substituted off) 85'
Substitutions:
MF	18	Alessandro Schöpf	(yellow card) 86'	(substituted on) 65'
FW	19	Lukas Hinterseer		(substituted on) 85'
DF	16	Kevin Wimmer		(substituted on) 87'
Manager:
(Switzerland) Marcel Koller

Man of the Match:
João Moutinho (Portugal)

Assistant referees:
Elenito Di Liberatore (Italy)
Mauro Tonolini (Italy)
Fourth official:
Alexandru Tudor (Romania)
Additional assistant referees:
Daniele Orsato (Italy)
Antonio Damato (Italy)
Reserve assistant referee:
Octavian Șovre (Romania)

=== Iceland vs Austria ===
22 June 2016
18:00

Iceland	2–1	Austria
Böðvarsson 18'; Traustason 90+4'	Report	Schöpf 60'

Stade de France, Saint-Denis
Attendance: 68,714
Referee: Szymon Marciniak (Poland)

Iceland	Austria

GK	1	Hannes Þór Halldórsson	(yellow card) 82'
RB	2	Birkir Már Sævarsson
CB	14	Kári Árnason	(yellow card) 78'
CB	6	Ragnar Sigurðsson
LB	23	Ari Freyr Skúlason	(yellow card) 36'
RM	7	Jóhann Berg Guðmundsson		(substituted off) 86'
CM	17	Aron Gunnarsson (c)
CM	10	Gylfi Sigurðsson
LM	8	Birkir Bjarnason
CF	15	Jón Daði Böðvarsson		(substituted off) 71'
CF	9	Kolbeinn Sigþórsson	(yellow card) 51'	(substituted off) 80'
Substitutions:
MF	18	Theódór Elmar Bjarnason		(substituted on) 71'
MF	21	Arnór Ingvi Traustason		(substituted on) 80'
DF	5	Sverrir Ingi Ingason		(substituted on) 86'
Managers:
Heimir Hallgrímsson (Sweden) Lars Lagerbäck

GK	1	Robert Almer
RB	3	Aleksandar Dragović
CB	15	Sebastian Prödl		(substituted off) 46'
CB	4	Martin Hinteregger
LB	5	Christian Fuchs (c)
CM	6	Stefan Ilsanker		(substituted off) 46'
CM	14	Julian Baumgartlinger
RW	17	Florian Klein
AM	8	David Alaba
LW	7	Marko Arnautović
CF	20	Marcel Sabitzer		(substituted off) 78'
Substitutions:
FW	21	Marc Janko	(yellow card) 70'	(substituted on) 46'
MF	18	Alessandro Schöpf		(substituted on) 46'
MF	22	Jakob Jantscher		(substituted on) 78'
Manager:
(Switzerland) Marcel Koller

Man of the Match:
Kári Árnason (Iceland)

Assistant referees:
Paweł Sokolnicki (Poland)
Tomasz Listkiewicz (Poland)
Fourth official:
Mark Clattenburg (England)
Additional assistant referees:
Paweł Raczkowski (Poland)
Tomasz Musiał (Poland)
Reserve assistant referee:
Simon Beck (England)

=== Hungary vs Portugal ===
22 June 2016
18:00

Hungary	3–3	Portugal
Gera 19'; Dzsudzsák 47', 55'	Report	Nani 42'; Ronaldo 50', 62'

Parc Olympique Lyonnais, Décines-Charpieu
Attendance: 55,514
Referee: Martin Atkinson (England)

Hungary	Portugal

GK	1	Gábor Király
RB	2	Ádám Lang
CB	20	Richárd Guzmics	(yellow card) 13'
CB	23	Roland Juhász	(yellow card) 28'
LB	3	Mihály Korhut
CM	6	Ákos Elek
CM	10	Zoltán Gera	(yellow card) 34'	(substituted off) 46'
CM	16	Ádám Pintér
RW	14	Gergő Lovrencsics		(substituted off) 83'
LW	7	Balázs Dzsudzsák (c)	(yellow card) 56'
CF	9	Ádám Szalai		(substituted off) 71'
Substitutions:
DF	21	Barnabás Bese		(substituted on) 46'
FW	11	Krisztián Németh		(substituted on) 71'
MF	18	Zoltán Stieber		(substituted on) 83'
Manager:
(Germany) Bernd Storck

GK	1	Rui Patrício
RB	11	Vieirinha
CB	3	Pepe
CB	6	Ricardo Carvalho
LB	19	Eliseu
RM	15	André Gomes	(substituted off) 61'
CM	14	William Carvalho
CM	8	João Moutinho	(substituted off) 46'
LM	10	João Mário
CF	7	Cristiano Ronaldo (c)
CF	17	Nani	(substituted off) 81'
Substitutions:
MF	16	Renato Sanches	(substituted on) 46'
MF	20	Ricardo Quaresma	(substituted on) 61'
MF	13	Danilo	(substituted on) 81'
Manager:
Fernando Santos

Man of the Match:
Cristiano Ronaldo (Portugal)

Assistant referees:
Michael Mullarkey (England)
Stephen Child (England)
Fourth official:
Aleksei Kulbakov (Belarus)
Additional assistant referees:
Michael Oliver (England)
Craig Pawson (England)
Reserve assistant referee:
Vitali Maliutsin (Belarus)

== See also ==
- Austria at the UEFA European Championship
- Hungary at the UEFA European Championship
- Iceland at the UEFA European Championship
- Portugal at the UEFA European Championship
