= UEFA Euro 2016 knockout stage =

International football tournament stage

The knockout stage of UEFA Euro 2016 began on 25 June 2016 and ended on 10 July 2016 with the final in Saint-Denis, France, near Paris.

All times listed are Central European Summer Time (UTC+2)

== Format ==
In the knockout stage, extra time and a penalty shoot-out were used to decide the winners if necessary. As with every tournament since UEFA Euro 1984, there was no third place play-off.

UEFA set out the following schedule for the round of 16:

- Match 1: Runners-up Group A vs Runners-up Group C
- Match 2: Winners Group D vs 3rd Place Group B/E/F
- Match 3: Winners Group B vs 3rd Place Group A/C/D
- Match 4: Winners Group F vs Runners-up Group E
- Match 5: Winners Group C vs 3rd Place Group A/B/F
- Match 6: Winners Group E vs Runners-up Group D
- Match 7: Winners Group A vs 3rd Place Group C/D/E
- Match 8: Runners-up Group B vs Runners-up Group F

=== Combinations of matches in the Round of 16 ===
The specific match-ups involving the third-placed teams depended on which four third-placed teams from 15 possible combinations qualified for the round of 16:

Combination used according to the four qualified teams

Third-placed teams qualify from groups						1A vs	1B vs	1C vs	1D vs
A	B	C	D			3C	3D	3A	3B
A	B	C		E		3C	3A	3B	3E
A	B	C			F	3C	3A	3B	3F
A	B		D	E		3D	3A	3B	3E
A	B		D		F	3D	3A	3B	3F
A	B			E	F	3E	3A	3B	3F
A		C	D	E		3C	3D	3A	3E
A		C	D		F	3C	3D	3A	3F
A		C		E	F	3C	3A	3F	3E
A			D	E	F	3D	3A	3F	3E
	B	C	D	E		3C	3D	3B	3E
	B	C	D		F	3C	3D	3B	3F
	B	C		E	F	3E	3C	3B	3F
	B		D	E	F	3E	3D	3B	3F
		C	D	E	F	3C	3D	3F	3E

== Qualified teams ==
The top two placed teams from each of the six groups qualified for the knockout stage, along with the four best third-placed teams.

Group	Winners	Runners-up	Third-placed teams (Best four qualified)
A	France	Switzerland	—N/a
B	Wales	England	Slovakia
C	Germany	Poland	Northern Ireland
D	Croatia	Spain	—N/a
E	Italy	Belgium	Republic of Ireland
F	Hungary	Iceland	Portugal

== Bracket ==
Round of 16
25 June – Saint-Étienne
Switzerland	1 (4)
Poland (p)	1 (5)
25 June – Lens
Croatia	0
Portugal (a.e.t.)	1
25 June – Paris
Wales	1
Northern Ireland	0
26 June – Toulouse
Hungary	0
Belgium	4
26 June – Villeneuve-d'Ascq
Germany	3
Slovakia	0
27 June – Saint-Denis
Italy	2
Spain	0
26 June – Décines-Charpieu
France	2
Republic of Ireland	1
27 June – Nice
England	1
Iceland	2

Quarter-finals
30 June – Marseille
Poland	1 (3)
Portugal (p)	1 (5)
1 July – Villeneuve-d'Ascq
Wales	3
Belgium	1
2 July – Bordeaux
Germany (p)	1 (6)
Italy	1 (5)
3 July – Saint-Denis
France	5
Iceland	2

Semi-finals
6 July – Décines-Charpieu
Portugal	2
Wales	0
7 July – Marseille
Germany	0
France	2

Final
10 July – Saint-Denis
Portugal (a.e.t.)	1
France	0

== Round of 16 ==
=== Switzerland vs Poland ===
25 June 2016
15:00

Switzerland	1–1 (a.e.t.)	Poland
Shaqiri 82'	Report	Błaszczykowski 39'
Penalties
Lichtsteiner (penalty scored); Xhaka (penalty missed); Shaqiri (penalty scored); Schär (penalty scored); Rodriguez (penalty scored)	4–5	(penalty scored) Lewandowski; (penalty scored) Milik; (penalty scored) Glik; (penalty scored) Błaszczykowski; (penalty scored) Krychowiak

Stade Geoffroy-Guichard, Saint-Étienne
Attendance: 38,842
Referee: Mark Clattenburg (England)

Switzerland	Poland

GK	1	Yann Sommer
RB	2	Stephan Lichtsteiner (c)
CB	22	Fabian Schär	(yellow card) 55'
CB	20	Johan Djourou	(yellow card) 117'
LB	13	Ricardo Rodriguez
CM	11	Valon Behrami		(substituted off) 77'
CM	10	Granit Xhaka
RW	23	Xherdan Shaqiri
AM	15	Blerim Džemaili		(substituted off) 58'
LW	18	Admir Mehmedi		(substituted off) 70'
CF	9	Haris Seferovic
Substitutions:
FW	7	Breel Embolo		(substituted on) 58'
FW	19	Eren Derdiyok		(substituted on) 70'
MF	16	Gelson Fernandes		(substituted on) 77'
Manager:
Vladimir Petković

GK	22	Łukasz Fabiański
RB	20	Łukasz Piszczek
CB	15	Kamil Glik
CB	2	Michał Pazdan	(yellow card) 111'
LB	3	Artur Jędrzejczyk	(yellow card) 58'
RM	16	Jakub Błaszczykowski
CM	10	Grzegorz Krychowiak
CM	5	Krzysztof Mączyński		(substituted off) 101'
LM	11	Kamil Grosicki		(substituted off) 104'
SS	7	Arkadiusz Milik
CF	9	Robert Lewandowski (c)
Substitutions:
MF	6	Tomasz Jodłowiec		(substituted on) 101'
MF	17	Sławomir Peszko		(substituted on) 104'
Manager:
Adam Nawałka

Man of the Match:
Xherdan Shaqiri (Switzerland)

Assistant referees:
Simon Beck (England)
Jake Collin (England)
Fourth official:
Anastasios Sidiropoulos (Greece)
Additional assistant referees:
Anthony Taylor (England)
Andre Marriner (England)
Reserve assistant referee:
Damianos Efthymiadis (Greece)

=== Wales vs Northern Ireland ===
25 June 2016
18:00

Wales	1–0	Northern Ireland
McAuley 75' (o.g.)	Report

Parc des Princes, Paris
Attendance: 44,342
Referee: Martin Atkinson (England)

Wales	Northern Ireland

GK	1	Wayne Hennessey
CB	5	James Chester
CB	6	Ashley Williams (c)
CB	4	Ben Davies
RM	2	Chris Gunter
CM	7	Joe Allen
CM	16	Joe Ledley		(substituted off) 63'
CM	10	Aaron Ramsey	(yellow card) 90+4'
LM	3	Neil Taylor	(yellow card) 58'
CF	18	Sam Vokes		(substituted off) 55'
CF	11	Gareth Bale
Substitutions:
FW	9	Hal Robson-Kanu		(substituted on) 55'
MF	20	Jonny Williams		(substituted on) 63'
Manager:
Chris Coleman

GK	1	Michael McGovern
RB	18	Aaron Hughes
CB	4	Gareth McAuley		(substituted off) 84'
CB	20	Craig Cathcart
LB	5	Jonny Evans
CM	8	Steven Davis (c)	(yellow card) 67'
CM	13	Corry Evans
CM	16	Oliver Norwood		(substituted off) 79'
RW	19	Jamie Ward		(substituted off) 69'
LW	14	Stuart Dallas	(yellow card) 44'
CF	10	Kyle Lafferty
Substitutions:
FW	11	Conor Washington		(substituted on) 69'
MF	7	Niall McGinn		(substituted on) 79'
FW	21	Josh Magennis		(substituted on) 84'
Manager:
Michael O'Neill

Man of the Match:
Gareth Bale (Wales)

Assistant referees:
Michael Mullarkey (England)
Stephen Child (England)
Fourth official:
Felix Brych (Germany)
Additional assistant referees:
Michael Oliver (England)
Craig Pawson (England)
Reserve assistant referee:
Mark Borsch (Germany)

=== Croatia vs Portugal ===
25 June 2016
21:00

Croatia	0–1 (a.e.t.)	Portugal
	Report	Quaresma 117'

Stade Bollaert-Delelis, Lens
Attendance: 33,523
Referee: Carlos Velasco Carballo (Spain)

Croatia	Portugal

GK	23	Danijel Subašić
RB	11	Darijo Srna (c)
CB	5	Vedran Ćorluka	(substituted off) 120'
CB	21	Domagoj Vida
LB	3	Ivan Strinić
CM	10	Luka Modrić
CM	19	Milan Badelj
RW	14	Marcelo Brozović
AM	7	Ivan Rakitić	(substituted off) 110'
LW	4	Ivan Perišić
CF	17	Mario Mandžukić	(substituted off) 88'
Substitutions:
FW	16	Nikola Kalinić	(substituted on) 88'
FW	20	Marko Pjaca	(substituted on) 110'
FW	9	Andrej Kramarić	(substituted on) 120'
Manager:
Ante Čačić

GK	1	Rui Patrício
RB	21	Cédric
CB	3	Pepe
CB	4	José Fonte
LB	5	Raphaël Guerreiro
RM	10	João Mário		(substituted off) 87'
CM	23	Adrien Silva		(substituted off) 108'
CM	14	William Carvalho	(yellow card) 78'
LM	15	André Gomes		(substituted off) 50'
CF	17	Nani
CF	7	Cristiano Ronaldo (c)
Substitutions:
MF	16	Renato Sanches		(substituted on) 50'
FW	20	Ricardo Quaresma		(substituted on) 87'
MF	13	Danilo		(substituted on) 108'
Manager:
Fernando Santos

Man of the Match:
Renato Sanches (Portugal)

Assistant referees:
Roberto Alonso Fernández (Spain)
Juan Carlos Yuste Jiménez (Spain)
Fourth official:
Viktor Kassai (Hungary)
Additional assistant referees:
Jesús Gil Manzano (Spain)
Carlos del Cerro Grande (Spain)
Reserve assistant referee:
György Ring (Hungary)

=== France vs Republic of Ireland ===
26 June 2016
15:00

France	2–1	Republic of Ireland
Griezmann 58', 61'	Report	Brady 2' (pen.)

Parc Olympique Lyonnais, Décines-Charpieu
Attendance: 56,279
Referee: Nicola Rizzoli (Italy)

France	Republic of Ireland

GK	1	Hugo Lloris (c)
RB	19	Bacary Sagna
CB	4	Adil Rami	(yellow card) 44'
CB	21	Laurent Koscielny
LB	3	Patrice Evra
CM	15	Paul Pogba
CM	5	N'Golo Kanté	(yellow card) 27'	(substituted off) 46'
CM	14	Blaise Matuidi
RW	7	Antoine Griezmann
LW	8	Dimitri Payet
CF	9	Olivier Giroud		(substituted off) 73'
Substitutions:
FW	20	Kingsley Coman		(substituted on) 46'	(substituted off) 90+3'
FW	10	André-Pierre Gignac		(substituted on) 73'
MF	18	Moussa Sissoko			(substituted on) 90+3'
Manager:
Didier Deschamps

GK	23	Darren Randolph
RB	2	Séamus Coleman (c)	(yellow card) 25'
CB	5	Richard Keogh
CB	12	Shane Duffy	(red card) 66'
LB	17	Stephen Ward
RM	19	Robbie Brady
CM	8	James McCarthy		(substituted off) 71'
CM	13	Jeff Hendrick	(yellow card) 41'
LM	11	James McClean		(substituted off) 68'
CF	9	Shane Long	(yellow card) 72'
CF	21	Daryl Murphy		(substituted off) 65'
Substitutions:
FW	14	Jonathan Walters		(substituted on) 65'
DF	4	John O'Shea		(substituted on) 68'
MF	20	Wes Hoolahan		(substituted on) 71'
Manager:
(Northern Ireland) Martin O'Neill

Man of the Match:
Antoine Griezmann (France)

Assistant referees:
Elenito Di Liberatore (Italy)
Mauro Tonolini (Italy)
Fourth official:
Aleksei Kulbakov (Belarus)
Additional assistant referees:
Daniele Orsato (Italy)
Antonio Damato (Italy)
Reserve assistant referee:
Vitali Maliutsin (Belarus)

=== Germany vs Slovakia ===
26 June 2016
18:00

Germany	3–0	Slovakia
Boateng 8'; Gómez 43'; Draxler 63'	Report

Stade Pierre-Mauroy, Villeneuve-d'Ascq
Attendance: 44,312
Referee: Szymon Marciniak (Poland)

Germany	Slovakia

GK	1	Manuel Neuer (c)
RB	21	Joshua Kimmich	(yellow card) 46'
CB	17	Jérôme Boateng		(substituted off) 72'
CB	5	Mats Hummels	(yellow card) 67'
LB	3	Jonas Hector
CM	18	Toni Kroos
CM	6	Sami Khedira		(substituted off) 76'
RW	13	Thomas Müller
AM	8	Mesut Özil
LW	11	Julian Draxler		(substituted off) 72'
CF	23	Mario Gómez
Substitutions:
DF	4	Benedikt Höwedes		(substituted on) 72'
FW	10	Lukas Podolski		(substituted on) 72'
MF	7	Bastian Schweinsteiger		(substituted on) 76'
Manager:
Joachim Löw

GK	23	Matúš Kozáčik
RB	2	Peter Pekarík
CB	3	Martin Škrtel (c)	(yellow card) 13'
CB	4	Ján Ďurica
LB	5	Norbert Gyömbér		(substituted off) 84'
CM	13	Patrik Hrošovský
CM	14	Milan Škriniar
CM	17	Marek Hamšík
RW	19	Juraj Kucka	(yellow card) 90+1'
LW	7	Vladimír Weiss		(substituted off) 46'
CF	21	Michal Ďuriš		(substituted off) 64'
Substitutions:
MF	6	Ján Greguš		(substituted on) 46'
FW	9	Stanislav Šesták		(substituted on) 64'
DF	16	Kornel Saláta		(substituted on) 84'
Manager:
Ján Kozák

Man of the Match:
Julian Draxler (Germany)

Assistant referees:
Paweł Sokolnicki (Poland)
Tomasz Listkiewicz (Poland)
Fourth official:
Björn Kuipers (Netherlands)
Additional assistant referees:
Paweł Raczkowski (Poland)
Tomasz Musiał (Poland)
Reserve assistant referee:
Erwin Zeinstra (Netherlands)

=== Hungary vs Belgium ===
26 June 2016
21:00

Hungary	0–4	Belgium
	Report	Alderweireld 10'; Batshuayi 78'; Hazard 80'; Carrasco 90+1'

Stadium Municipal, Toulouse
Attendance: 28,921
Referee: Milorad Mažić (Serbia)

Hungary	Belgium

GK	1	Gábor Király
RB	2	Ádám Lang	(yellow card) 47'
CB	20	Richárd Guzmics
CB	23	Roland Juhász		(substituted off) 79'
LB	4	Tamás Kádár	(yellow card) 34'
CM	8	Ádám Nagy
CM	10	Zoltán Gera		(substituted off) 46'
CM	16	Ádám Pintér		(substituted off) 75'
RW	14	Gergő Lovrencsics
LW	7	Balázs Dzsudzsák (c)
CF	9	Ádám Szalai	(yellow card) 90+2'
Substitutions:
MF	6	Ákos Elek	(yellow card) 61'	(substituted on) 46'
FW	17	Nemanja Nikolić		(substituted on) 75'
FW	13	Dániel Böde		(substituted on) 79'
Manager:
(Germany) Bernd Storck

GK	1	Thibaut Courtois
RB	16	Thomas Meunier
CB	2	Toby Alderweireld
CB	3	Thomas Vermaelen	(yellow card) 67'
LB	5	Jan Vertonghen
CM	4	Radja Nainggolan
CM	6	Axel Witsel
AM	7	Kevin De Bruyne
RW	14	Dries Mertens		(substituted off) 70'
LW	10	Eden Hazard (c)		(substituted off) 81'
CF	9	Romelu Lukaku		(substituted off) 76'
Substitutions:
FW	11	Yannick Carrasco		(substituted on) 70'
FW	22	Michy Batshuayi	(yellow card) 89'	(substituted on) 76'
MF	8	Marouane Fellaini	(yellow card) 90+2'	(substituted on) 81'
Manager:
Marc Wilmots

Man of the Match:
Eden Hazard (Belgium)

Assistant referees:
Milovan Ristić (Serbia)
Dalibor Đurđević (Serbia)
Fourth official:
Jonas Eriksson (Sweden)
Additional assistant referees:
Danilo Grujić (Serbia)
Nenad Đokić (Serbia)
Reserve assistant referee:
Daniel Wärnmark (Sweden)

=== Italy vs Spain ===
27 June 2016
18:00

Italy	2–0	Spain
Chiellini 33'; Pellè 90+1'	Report

Stade de France, Saint-Denis
Attendance: 76,165
Referee: Cüneyt Çakır (Turkey)

Italy	Spain

GK	1	Gianluigi Buffon (c)
CB	15	Andrea Barzagli
CB	19	Leonardo Bonucci
CB	3	Giorgio Chiellini
RWB	8	Alessandro Florenzi		(substituted off) 84'
LWB	2	Mattia De Sciglio	(yellow card) 24'
DM	16	Daniele De Rossi		(substituted off) 54'
CM	18	Marco Parolo
CM	23	Emanuele Giaccherini
SS	17	Éder		(substituted off) 82'
CF	9	Graziano Pellè	(yellow card) 54'
Substitutions:
MF	10	Thiago Motta	(yellow card) 89'	(substituted on) 54'
FW	20	Lorenzo Insigne		(substituted on) 82'
DF	4	Matteo Darmian		(substituted on) 84'
Manager:
Antonio Conte

GK	13	David de Gea
RB	16	Juanfran
CB	3	Gerard Piqué
CB	15	Sergio Ramos (c)
LB	18	Jordi Alba	(yellow card) 89'
DM	5	Sergio Busquets	(yellow card) 89'
CM	10	Cesc Fàbregas
CM	6	Andrés Iniesta
RW	21	David Silva	(yellow card) 90+4'
LW	22	Nolito	(yellow card) 41'	(substituted off) 46'
CF	7	Álvaro Morata		(substituted off) 70'
Substitutions:
FW	20	Aritz Aduriz		(substituted on) 46'	(substituted off) 81'
FW	9	Lucas Vázquez		(substituted on) 70'
FW	11	Pedro			(substituted on) 81'
Manager:
Vicente del Bosque

Man of the Match:
Leonardo Bonucci (Italy)

Assistant referees:
Bahattin Duran (Turkey)
Tarık Ongun (Turkey)
Fourth official:
Martin Atkinson (England)
Additional assistant referees:
Hüseyin Göçek (Turkey)
Barış Şimşek (Turkey)
Reserve assistant referee:
Michael Mullarkey (England)

=== England vs Iceland ===
The match has been described as one of England's worst defeats ever, and one of the biggest upsets in European football history.

Former footballer and Talksport presenter Stan Collymore, who was commentating on the game, panned the England team, reserving special criticism for goalkeeper Joe Hart and captain Wayne Rooney. Former England international and BBC Sport pundit Alan Shearer described it as the worst performance he had ever seen from an England team. The defeat was called England's most shocking since losing 1–0 to the United States in the 1950 World Cup.

The English team was viciously mocked by the press who described it as a "second exit from Europe", referencing the United Kingdom's vote to leave the European Union just four days earlier. The English media called the result a national embarrassment, criticising the team's fitness and calling the fans unsportsmanlike. Consequently, England manager Roy Hodgson announced his resignation following the match.

27 June 2016
21:00

England	1–2	Iceland
Rooney 4' (pen.)	Report	R. Sigurðsson 6'; Sigþórsson 18'

Stade de Nice, Nice
Attendance: 33,901
Referee: Damir Skomina (Slovenia)

England	Iceland

GK	1	Joe Hart
RB	2	Kyle Walker
CB	5	Gary Cahill
CB	6	Chris Smalling
LB	3	Danny Rose
CM	20	Dele Alli
CM	17	Eric Dier		(substituted off) 46'
CM	10	Wayne Rooney (c)		(substituted off) 87'
RF	15	Daniel Sturridge	(yellow card) 47'
CF	9	Harry Kane
LF	7	Raheem Sterling		(substituted off) 60'
Substitutions:
MF	18	Jack Wilshere		(substituted on) 46'
FW	11	Jamie Vardy		(substituted on) 60'
FW	22	Marcus Rashford		(substituted on) 87'
Manager:
Roy Hodgson

GK	1	Hannes Þór Halldórsson
RB	2	Birkir Már Sævarsson
CB	14	Kári Árnason
CB	6	Ragnar Sigurðsson
LB	23	Ari Freyr Skúlason
RM	7	Jóhann Berg Guðmundsson
CM	10	Gylfi Sigurðsson	(yellow card) 38'
CM	17	Aron Gunnarsson (c)	(yellow card) 65'
LM	8	Birkir Bjarnason
CF	9	Kolbeinn Sigþórsson		(substituted off) 77'
CF	15	Jón Daði Böðvarsson		(substituted off) 89'
Substitutions:
MF	18	Theódór Elmar Bjarnason		(substituted on) 77'
MF	21	Arnór Ingvi Traustason		(substituted on) 89'
Managers:
Heimir Hallgrímsson (Sweden) Lars Lagerbäck

Man of the Match:
Ragnar Sigurðsson (Iceland)

Assistant referees:
Jure Praprotnik (Slovenia)
Robert Vukan (Slovenia)
Fourth official:
Carlos Velasco Carballo (Spain)
Additional assistant referees:
Matej Jug (Slovenia)
Slavko Vinčić (Slovenia)
Reserve assistant referee:
Roberto Alonso Fernández (Spain)

== Quarter-finals ==
=== Poland vs Portugal ===
30 June 2016
21:00

Poland	1–1 (a.e.t.)	Portugal
Lewandowski 2'	Report	Sanches 33'
Penalties
Lewandowski (penalty scored); Milik (penalty scored); Glik (penalty scored); Błaszczykowski (penalty missed)	3–5	(penalty scored) Ronaldo; (penalty scored) Sanches; (penalty scored) Moutinho; (penalty scored) Nani; (penalty scored) Quaresma

Stade Vélodrome, Marseille
Attendance: 62,940
Referee: Felix Brych (Germany)

Poland	Portugal

GK	22	Łukasz Fabiański
RB	20	Łukasz Piszczek
CB	15	Kamil Glik	(yellow card) 66'
CB	2	Michał Pazdan
LB	3	Artur Jędrzejczyk	(yellow card) 42'
RM	16	Jakub Błaszczykowski
CM	10	Grzegorz Krychowiak
CM	5	Krzysztof Mączyński		(substituted off) 98'
LM	11	Kamil Grosicki		(substituted off) 82'
SS	7	Arkadiusz Milik
CF	9	Robert Lewandowski (c)
Substitutions:
MF	21	Bartosz Kapustka	(yellow card) 89'	(substituted on) 82'
MF	6	Tomasz Jodłowiec		(substituted on) 98'
Manager:
Adam Nawałka

GK	1	Rui Patrício
RB	21	Cédric
CB	3	Pepe
CB	4	José Fonte
LB	19	Eliseu
DM	14	William Carvalho	(yellow card) 90+2'	(substituted off) 96'
RM	10	João Mário		(substituted off) 80'
CM	16	Renato Sanches
LM	23	Adrien Silva	(yellow card) 70'	(substituted off) 73'
SS	17	Nani
CF	7	Cristiano Ronaldo (c)
Substitutions:
MF	8	João Moutinho		(substituted on) 73'
FW	20	Ricardo Quaresma		(substituted on) 80'
MF	13	Danilo		(substituted on) 96'
Manager:
Fernando Santos

Man of the Match:
Renato Sanches (Portugal)

Assistant referees:
Mark Borsch (Germany)
Stefan Lupp (Germany)
Fourth official:
Milorad Mažić (Serbia)
Additional assistant referees:
Bastian Dankert (Germany)
Marco Fritz (Germany)
Reserve assistant referee:
Milovan Ristić (Serbia)

=== Wales vs Belgium ===
1 July 2016
21:00

Wales	3–1	Belgium
A. Williams 31'; Robson-Kanu 55'; Vokes 86'	Report	Nainggolan 13'

Stade Pierre-Mauroy, Villeneuve-d'Ascq
Attendance: 45,936
Referee: Damir Skomina (Slovenia)

Wales	Belgium

GK	1	Wayne Hennessey
CB	5	James Chester	(yellow card) 16'
CB	6	Ashley Williams (c)
CB	4	Ben Davies	(yellow card) 5'
DM	16	Joe Ledley		(substituted off) 78'
CM	7	Joe Allen
CM	10	Aaron Ramsey	(yellow card) 75'	(substituted off) 90'
RW	3	Neil Taylor
LW	2	Chris Gunter	(yellow card) 24'
CF	9	Hal Robson-Kanu		(substituted off) 80'
CF	11	Gareth Bale
Substitutions:
MF	8	Andy King		(substituted on) 78'
FW	18	Sam Vokes		(substituted on) 80'
DF	19	James Collins		(substituted on) 90'
Manager:
Chris Coleman

GK	1	Thibaut Courtois
RB	16	Thomas Meunier
CB	2	Toby Alderweireld	(yellow card) 85'
CB	15	Jason Denayer
LB	21	Jordan Lukaku		(substituted off) 75'
CM	4	Radja Nainggolan
CM	6	Axel Witsel
RW	11	Yannick Carrasco		(substituted off) 46'
AM	7	Kevin De Bruyne
LW	10	Eden Hazard (c)
CF	9	Romelu Lukaku		(substituted off) 83'
Substitutions:
MF	8	Marouane Fellaini	(yellow card) 59'	(substituted on) 46'
FW	14	Dries Mertens		(substituted on) 75'
FW	22	Michy Batshuayi		(substituted on) 83'
Manager:
Marc Wilmots

Man of the Match:
Hal Robson-Kanu (Wales)

Assistant referees:
Jure Praprotnik (Slovenia)
Robert Vukan (Slovenia)
Fourth official:
Nicola Rizzoli (Italy)
Additional assistant referees:
Matej Jug (Slovenia)
Slavko Vinčić (Slovenia)
Reserve assistant referee:
Elenito Di Liberatore (Italy)

=== Germany vs Italy ===
2 July 2016
21:00

Germany	1–1 (a.e.t.)	Italy
Özil 65'	Report	Bonucci 78' (pen.)
Penalties
Kroos (penalty scored); Müller (penalty missed); Özil (penalty missed); Draxler (penalty scored); Schweinsteiger (penalty missed); Hummels (penalty scored); Kimmich (penalty scored); Boateng (penalty scored); Hector (penalty scored)	6–5	(penalty scored) Insigne; (penalty missed) Zaza; (penalty scored) Barzagli; (penalty missed) Pellè; (penalty missed) Bonucci; (penalty scored) Giaccherini; (penalty scored) Parolo; (penalty scored) De Sciglio; (penalty missed) Darmian

Stade de Bordeaux, Bordeaux
Attendance: 38,764
Referee: Viktor Kassai (Hungary)

Germany	Italy

GK	1	Manuel Neuer (c)
RB	4	Benedikt Höwedes
CB	17	Jérôme Boateng
CB	5	Mats Hummels	(yellow card) 90'
LB	3	Jonas Hector
RM	21	Joshua Kimmich
CM	6	Sami Khedira		(substituted off) 16'
CM	18	Toni Kroos
LM	8	Mesut Özil
CF	13	Thomas Müller
CF	23	Mario Gómez		(substituted off) 72'
Substitutions:
MF	7	Bastian Schweinsteiger	(yellow card) 112'	(substituted on) 16'
MF	11	Julian Draxler		(substituted on) 72'
Manager:
Joachim Löw

GK	1	Gianluigi Buffon (c)
CB	15	Andrea Barzagli
CB	19	Leonardo Bonucci
CB	3	Giorgio Chiellini		(substituted off) 120+1'
DM	18	Marco Parolo	(yellow card) 59'
CM	14	Stefano Sturaro	(yellow card) 56'
CM	23	Emanuele Giaccherini	(yellow card) 103'
RW	8	Alessandro Florenzi		(substituted off) 86'
LW	2	Mattia De Sciglio	(yellow card) 57'
CF	9	Graziano Pellè	(yellow card) 91'
CF	17	Éder		(substituted off) 108'
Substitutions:
DF	4	Matteo Darmian		(substituted on) 86'
FW	20	Lorenzo Insigne		(substituted on) 108'
FW	7	Simone Zaza		(substituted on) 120+1'
Manager:
Antonio Conte

Man of the Match:
Manuel Neuer (Germany)

Assistant referees:
György Ring (Hungary)
Vencel Tóth (Hungary)
Fourth official:
Szymon Marciniak (Poland)
Additional assistant referees:
Tamás Bognár (Hungary)
Ádám Farkas (Hungary)
Reserve assistant referee:
Paweł Sokolnicki (Poland)

=== France vs Iceland ===
3 July 2016
21:00

France	5–2	Iceland
Giroud 12', 59'; Pogba 20'; Payet 43'; Griezmann 45'	Report	Sigþórsson 56'; B. Bjarnason 84'

Stade de France, Saint-Denis
Attendance: 76,833
Referee: Björn Kuipers (Netherlands)

France	Iceland

GK	1	Hugo Lloris (c)
RB	19	Bacary Sagna
CB	22	Samuel Umtiti	(yellow card) 75'
CB	21	Laurent Koscielny		(substituted off) 72'
LB	3	Patrice Evra
CM	15	Paul Pogba
CM	14	Blaise Matuidi
RW	18	Moussa Sissoko
AM	7	Antoine Griezmann
LW	8	Dimitri Payet		(substituted off) 80'
CF	9	Olivier Giroud		(substituted off) 60'
Substitutions:
FW	10	André-Pierre Gignac		(substituted on) 60'
DF	13	Eliaquim Mangala		(substituted on) 72'
FW	20	Kingsley Coman		(substituted on) 80'
Manager:
Didier Deschamps

GK	1	Hannes Þór Halldórsson
RB	2	Birkir Már Sævarsson
CB	14	Kári Árnason		(substituted off) 46'
CB	6	Ragnar Sigurðsson
LB	23	Ari Freyr Skúlason
RM	7	Jóhann Berg Guðmundsson
CM	17	Aron Gunnarsson (c)
CM	10	Gylfi Sigurðsson
LM	8	Birkir Bjarnason	(yellow card) 58'
CF	9	Kolbeinn Sigþórsson		(substituted off) 83'
CF	15	Jón Daði Böðvarsson		(substituted off) 46'
Substitutions:
FW	11	Alfreð Finnbogason		(substituted on) 46'
DF	5	Sverrir Ingi Ingason		(substituted on) 46'
FW	22	Eiður Guðjohnsen		(substituted on) 83'
Managers:
Heimir Hallgrímsson (Sweden) Lars Lagerbäck

Man of the Match:
Olivier Giroud (France)

Assistant referees:
Sander van Roekel (Netherlands)
Erwin Zeinstra (Netherlands)
Fourth official:
Milorad Mažić (Serbia)
Additional assistant referees:
Pol van Boekel (Netherlands)
Richard Liesveld (Netherlands)
Reserve assistant referee:
Milovan Ristić (Serbia)

== Semi-finals ==
=== Portugal vs Wales ===
6 July 2016
21:00

Portugal	2–0	Wales
Ronaldo 50'; Nani 53'	Report

Parc Olympique Lyonnais, Décines-Charpieu
Attendance: 55,679
Referee: Jonas Eriksson (Sweden)

Portugal	Wales

GK	1	Rui Patrício
RB	21	Cédric
CB	2	Bruno Alves	(yellow card) 71'
CB	4	José Fonte
LB	5	Raphaël Guerreiro
DM	13	Danilo
CM	10	João Mário
CM	23	Adrien Silva		(substituted off) 79'
AM	16	Renato Sanches		(substituted off) 74'
CF	17	Nani		(substituted off) 86'
CF	7	Cristiano Ronaldo (c)	(yellow card) 72'
Substitutions:
MF	15	André Gomes		(substituted on) 74'
MF	8	João Moutinho		(substituted on) 79'
FW	20	Ricardo Quaresma		(substituted on) 86'
Manager:
Fernando Santos

GK	1	Wayne Hennessey
CB	5	James Chester	(yellow card) 62'
CB	19	James Collins		(substituted off) 66'
CB	6	Ashley Williams (c)
RWB	2	Chris Gunter
LWB	3	Neil Taylor
DM	16	Joe Ledley		(substituted off) 58'
CM	7	Joe Allen	(yellow card) 8'
CM	8	Andy King
CF	9	Hal Robson-Kanu		(substituted off) 63'
CF	11	Gareth Bale	(yellow card) 88'
Substitutions:
FW	18	Sam Vokes		(substituted on) 58'
FW	23	Simon Church		(substituted on) 63'
MF	20	Jonny Williams		(substituted on) 66'
Manager:
Chris Coleman

Man of the Match:
Cristiano Ronaldo (Portugal)

Assistant referees:
Mathias Klasenius (Sweden)
Daniel Wärnmark (Sweden)
Fourth official:
Szymon Marciniak (Poland)
Additional assistant referees:
Stefan Johannesson (Sweden)
Markus Strömbergsson (Sweden)
Reserve assistant referee:
Paweł Sokolnicki (Poland)

=== Germany vs France ===
7 July 2016
21:00

Germany	0–2	France
	Report	Griezmann 45+2' (pen.), 72'

Stade Vélodrome, Marseille
Attendance: 64,078
Referee: Nicola Rizzoli (Italy)

Germany	France

GK	1	Manuel Neuer
RB	21	Joshua Kimmich
CB	17	Jérôme Boateng		(substituted off) 61'
CB	4	Benedikt Höwedes
LB	3	Jonas Hector
CM	14	Emre Can	(yellow card) 36'	(substituted off) 67'
CM	7	Bastian Schweinsteiger (c)	(yellow card) 45+1'	(substituted off) 79'
RW	8	Mesut Özil	(yellow card) 45+1'
AM	18	Toni Kroos
LW	11	Julian Draxler	(yellow card) 50'
CF	13	Thomas Müller
Substitutions:
DF	2	Shkodran Mustafi		(substituted on) 61'
MF	19	Mario Götze		(substituted on) 67'
MF	20	Leroy Sané		(substituted on) 79'
Manager:
Joachim Löw

GK	1	Hugo Lloris (c)
RB	19	Bacary Sagna
CB	21	Laurent Koscielny
CB	22	Samuel Umtiti
LB	3	Patrice Evra	(yellow card) 43'
CM	15	Paul Pogba
CM	14	Blaise Matuidi
RW	18	Moussa Sissoko
AM	7	Antoine Griezmann		(substituted off) 90+2'
LW	8	Dimitri Payet		(substituted off) 71'
CF	9	Olivier Giroud		(substituted off) 78'
Substitutions:
MF	5	N'Golo Kanté	(yellow card) 75'	(substituted on) 71'
FW	10	André-Pierre Gignac		(substituted on) 78'
MF	6	Yohan Cabaye		(substituted on) 90+2'
Manager:
Didier Deschamps

Man of the Match:
Antoine Griezmann (France)

Assistant referees:
Elenito Di Liberatore (Italy)
Mauro Tonolini (Italy)
Fourth official:
Damir Skomina (Slovenia)
Additional assistant referees:
Daniele Orsato (Italy)
Antonio Damato (Italy)
Reserve assistant referee:
Jure Praprotnik (Slovenia)

== Final ==
10 July 2016
21:00

Portugal	1–0 (a.e.t.)	France
Eder 109'	Report

Stade de France, Saint-Denis
Attendance: 75,868
Referee: Mark Clattenburg (England)

Portugal	France

GK	1	Rui Patrício	(yellow card) 120+3'
RB	21	Cédric	(yellow card) 34'
CB	3	Pepe
CB	4	José Fonte	(yellow card) 119'
LB	5	Raphaël Guerreiro	(yellow card) 95'
DM	14	William Carvalho	(yellow card) 98'
RW	16	Renato Sanches		(substituted off) 79'
AM	23	Adrien Silva		(substituted off) 66'
LW	10	João Mário	(yellow card) 62'
CF	17	Nani
CF	7	Cristiano Ronaldo (c)		(substituted off) 25'
Substitutions:
FW	20	Ricardo Quaresma		(substituted on) 25'
MF	8	João Moutinho		(substituted on) 66'
FW	9	Eder		(substituted on) 79'
Manager:
Fernando Santos

GK	1	Hugo Lloris (c)
RB	19	Bacary Sagna
CB	21	Laurent Koscielny	(yellow card) 107'
CB	22	Samuel Umtiti	(yellow card) 80'
LB	3	Patrice Evra
RM	18	Moussa Sissoko		(substituted off) 110'
CM	15	Paul Pogba	(yellow card) 115'
CM	14	Blaise Matuidi	(yellow card) 97'
LM	8	Dimitri Payet		(substituted off) 58'
SS	7	Antoine Griezmann
CF	9	Olivier Giroud		(substituted off) 78'
Substitutions:
MF	20	Kingsley Coman		(substituted on) 58'
FW	10	André-Pierre Gignac		(substituted on) 78'
FW	11	Anthony Martial		(substituted on) 110'
Manager:
Didier Deschamps

Man of the Match:
Pepe (Portugal)

Assistant referees:
Simon Beck (England)
Jake Collin (England)
Fourth official:
Viktor Kassai (Hungary)
Additional assistant referees:
Anthony Taylor (England)
Andre Marriner (England)
Reserve assistant referee:
György Ring (Hungary)
