= Ragnar Sigurðsson =

Icelandic footballer

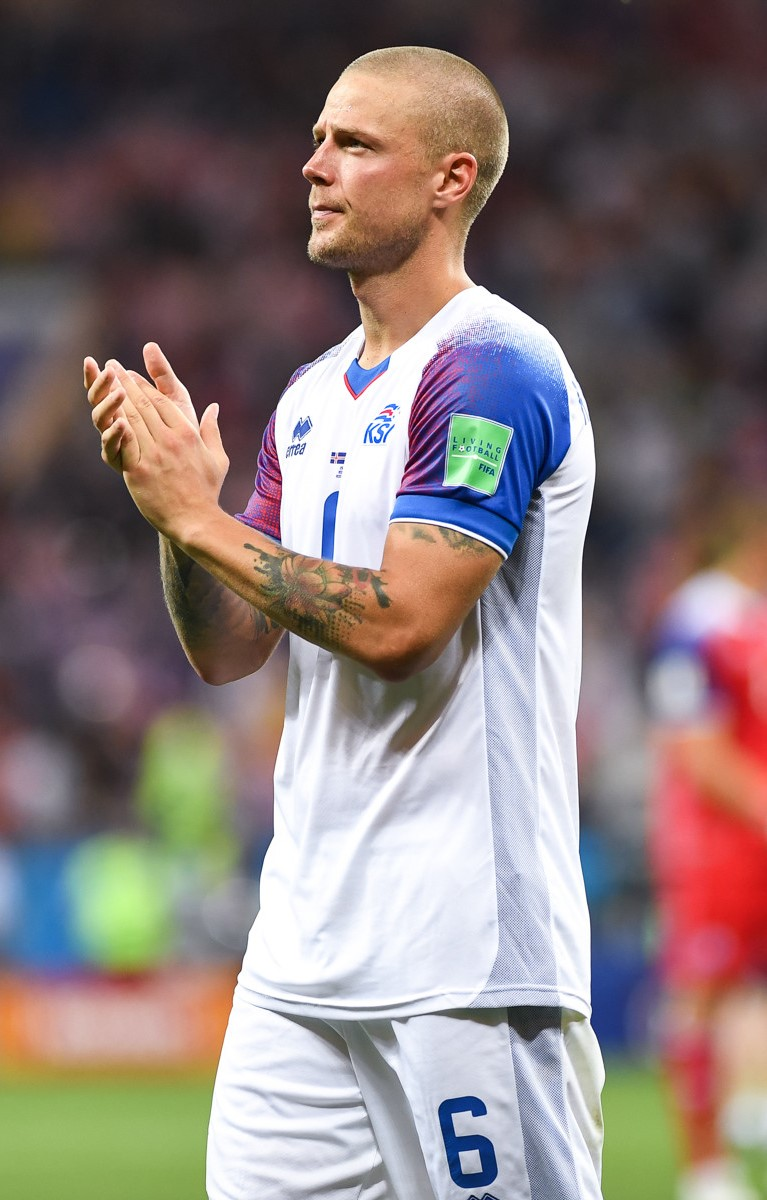
- Ragnar with Iceland at the 2018 FIFA World Cup

Personal information
- Full name: Ragnar Sigurðsson
- Date of birth: 19 June 1986 (age 40)
- Place of birth: Reykjavík, Iceland
- Height: 1.87 m (6 ft 2 in)
- Position: Centre-back

Youth career
- –2004: Fylkir

Senior career*
Years	Team	Apps	(Gls)
2004–2006	Fylkir	38	(2)
2007–2011	IFK Göteborg	125	(12)
2011–2014	Copenhagen	69	(4)
2014–2016	Krasnodar	59	(2)
2016–2018	Fulham	17	(1)
2017	→ Rubin Kazan (loan)	12	(0)
2018–2020	Rostov	49	(0)
2020	Copenhagen	5	(0)
2021	Rukh Lviv	1	(0)
2021	Fylkir	5	(0)
Total		380	(21)

International career
2001–2002	Iceland U17	11	(1)
2004	Iceland U19	5	(2)
2005–2006	Iceland U21	7	(0)
2007–2020	Iceland	97	(5)

Managerial career
- 2023: Fram Reykjavik
- 2025–: AGF U17
- * Club domestic league appearances and goals

Ragnar Sigurðsson (born 19 June 1986) is an Icelandic former professional footballer who played as centre-back. Beginning his career with Fylkir, he went on to represent IFK Göteborg, Copenhagen, Krasnodar, Fulham, Rubin Kazan, Rostov, and Rukh Lviv before retiring at Fylkir in 2021. A full international between 2007 and 2020, he won 97 caps for the Iceland national team and represented his country at the UEFA Euro 2016, reaching the quarter-finals, and the 2018 FIFA World Cup. In November 2022 Ragnar was introduced as assistant-manager of Fram Reykjavik and in July 2023 he became a caretaker-manager of the side following the departure of his predecessor Jón Þórir Sveinsson.

== Club career ==
=== IFK Göteborg ===
After playing for Fylkir, Ragnar joined Swedish club IFK Göteborg in 2006. He made his Allsvenskan debut on 6 April 2007, starting the first match of the 2007 season. He would go on to play 90 minutes in all 26 of the club's league matches, forming a formidable partnership with Mattias Bjärsmyr as the team won Allsvenskan 2007. He was constantly being linked to several big clubs in Ligue 1, Serie A, Bundesliga and the Premier League. IFK Göteborg's sports director, Håkan Mild commented that the club could get a transfer fee around €3 million for the talented defender. During his second season, Ragnar played 29 matches (of 30) as the team finished in 3rd place. The club also won the Supercupen and Svenska Cupen during the 2008 season.

=== F.C. Copenhagen ===
On 30 May 2011, Ragnar signed a four-year contract with Danish champions F.C. Copenhagen. The fee is believed to be around 5.5 million DKK.

=== FC Krasnodar ===
On 23 January 2014, Russian Football Premier League club FC Krasnodar announced they had signed Ragnar on a two-and-a-half-year deal with option for another year.

=== Fulham ===
On 23 August 2016, Ragnar signed a two-year deal with the Championship side Fulham for an undisclosed fee. He scored his first goal for Fulham in a 2–0 win against Ipswich Town on 26 December 2016.

=== Rubin Kazan ===
On 3 August 2017, he returned to Russia, signing a loan deal with FC Rubin Kazan for the 2017–18 season.

=== Rostov ===
On 18 January 2018, he signed a deal for a permanent transfer to FC Rostov, the third Russian club of his career, where he joined his Iceland national teammates Sverrir Ingi Ingason and Björn Bergmann Sigurðarson. On 1 January 2020, his contract with Rostov was terminated by mutual consent.

=== Return to Copenhagen ===
On 12 January 2020, he returned to Copenhagen, signing a contract until the summer of 2020.

=== Rukh Lviv ===
On 18 January 2021, Sigurðsson moved to Ukrainian Premier League side Rukh Lviv, signing a contract until the summer of 2021, with an option to prolong the deal for another year.

== International career ==
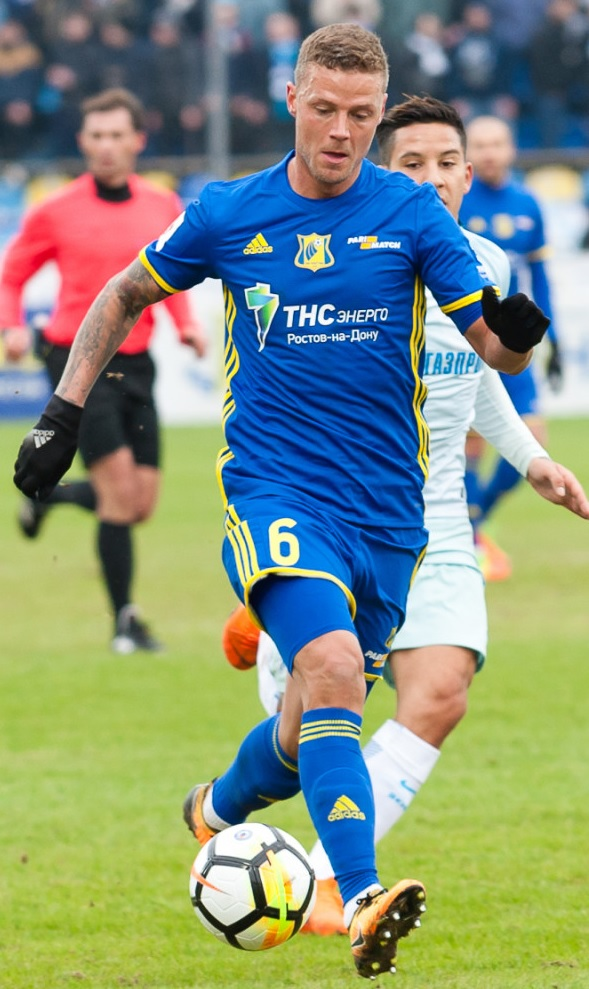
Ragnar playing for Rostov in 2018

Ragnar was selected for the 23-man squad led by Heimir Hallgrímsson and Lars Lagerbäck for Euro 2016. He scored his first goal for Iceland on 16 November 2014 in a 1–2 UEFA Euro 2016 qualifying defeat at Doosan Arena against the Czech Republic. On 27 June 2016, he scored Iceland's first goal in a 2–1 upset against England in the round of 16. His endeavours in the match resulted in him being selected as man of the match. Ragnar made a last-ditch tackle, described as "outstanding", to deny Jamie Vardy a potential equalizer in the match.

In May 2018 he was named in Iceland's 23-man squad for the 2018 World Cup in Russia.

== Personal life ==
On 5 July 2016, a rampage incident on Ragnar's home in Garðabær was notified to the police. When the police officers arrived to his house, Ragnar had left the scene but the apartment was in a bad state with ruined furniture. In a police report, Ragnar's then-wife asserted that he had threatened her. A few days later, Ragnar was brought in for questioning by the police where he denied all accusations of violence and threatening. Ragnar's neighbours, who had originally called the police, reported the incident the Football Association of Iceland (KSÍ), but no action was taken. The event was publicly revealed in September 2021 when several cases of violence by Icelandic professional footballers were exposed in the Icelandic media.

== Career statistics ==
=== Club ===
Appearances and goals by club, season and competition
Club	Season	League			Cup		Europe		Other (Note: Includes Svenska Supercupen and Icelandic League Cup)		Total	
Club	Season	Division	App	Goals	App	Goals	App	Goals	App	Goals	App	Goals
Fylkir U23	2002	Úrvalsdeild	—		1	0	—		—		1	0
Fylkir U23	2003	Úrvalsdeild	—		2	0	—		—		2	0
Fylkir	2004	Úrvalsdeild	3	0	2	0	1	0	1	0	7	0
Fylkir	2005	Úrvalsdeild	17	1	4	0	—		7	0	28	1
Fylkir	2006	Úrvalsdeild	18	1	1	0	—		4	0	23	1
Fylkir	Total		38	2	10	0	1	0	12	0	61	2
IFK Göteborg	2007	Allsvenskan	26	0	—		—		—		26	0
IFK Göteborg	2008	Allsvenskan	29	4	—		3	0	—		32	4
IFK Göteborg	2009	Allsvenskan	29	4	4	1	2	0	—		35	5
IFK Göteborg	2010	Allsvenskan	28	1	2	0	2	0	1 (Note: Appearance in the Svenska Supercupen)	0	33	1
IFK Göteborg	2011	Allsvenskan	13	3	2	0	0	0	—		15	3
IFK Göteborg	Total		125	12	8	1	5	0	1	0	139	13
Copenhagen	2011–12	Danish Superliga	24	1	4	0	9	0	—		37	1
Copenhagen	2012–13	Danish Superliga	31	3	0	0	10	0	—		41	3
Copenhagen	2013–14	Danish Superliga	14	0	1	0	9	0	—		24	0
Copenhagen	Total		69	4	5	0	28	0	0	0	102	4
Krasnodar	2013–14	Russian Premier League	6	0	3	0	—		—		9	0
Krasnodar	2014–15	Russian Premier League	26	1	2	0	11	0	—		39	1
Krasnodar	2015–16	Russian Premier League	24	1	2	1	9	1	—		35	3
Krasnodar	2016–17	Russian Premier League	3	0	0	0	0	0	—		3	0
Krasnodar	Total		59	2	7	1	20	1	0	0	86	4
Fulham	2016–17	Championship	17	1	1	0	—		—		18	1
Rubin Kazan (loan)	2017–18	Russian Premier League	12	0	1	0	—		—		13	0
Rostov	2017–18	Russian Premier League	9	0	—		—		—		9	0
Total			329	21	32	2	56	1	13	0	430	24

=== International ===
Appearances and goals by national team and year
National team	Year	Apps	Goals
Iceland	2007	6	0
Iceland	2008	4	0
Iceland	2009	3	0
Iceland	2010	3	0
Iceland	2011	0	0
Iceland	2012	8	0
Iceland	2013	10	0
Iceland	2014	8	1
Iceland	2015	9	0
Iceland	2016	15	2
Iceland	2017	8	0
Iceland	2018	10	0
Iceland	2019	10	2
Iceland	2020	3	0
Total		97	5

Scores and results list Iceland's goal tally first, score column indicates score after each Ragnar goal.

List of international goals scored by Ragnar Sigurðsson
No.	Date	Venue	Cap	Opponent	Score	Result	Competition
1	16 November 2014	Doosan Arena, Plzeň, Czech Republic	42	Czech Republic	1–0	1–2	UEFA Euro 2016 qualification
2	27 June 2016	Stade de Nice, Nice, France	60	England	1–1	2–1	UEFA Euro 2016
3	6 October 2016	Laugardalsvöllur, Reykjavík, Iceland	63	Finland	3–2	3–2	2018 FIFA World Cup qualification
4	11 June 2019	Laugardalsvöllur, Reykjavík, Iceland	88	Turkey	1–0	2–1	UEFA Euro 2020 qualification
5	11 June 2019	Laugardalsvöllur, Reykjavík, Iceland	88	Turkey	2–0	2–1	UEFA Euro 2020 qualification

== Honours ==
IFK Göteborg

- Allsvenskan: 2007
- Svenska Cupen: 2008
- Svenska Supercupen: 2008

Copenhagen

- Danish Superliga: 2012–13
- Danish Cup: 2011–12

Krasnodar

- Russian Premier League: Third place 2014–15

Individual

- Årets Ärkeängel: 2010
