= Aron Gunnarsson =

Icelandic footballer (born 1989)

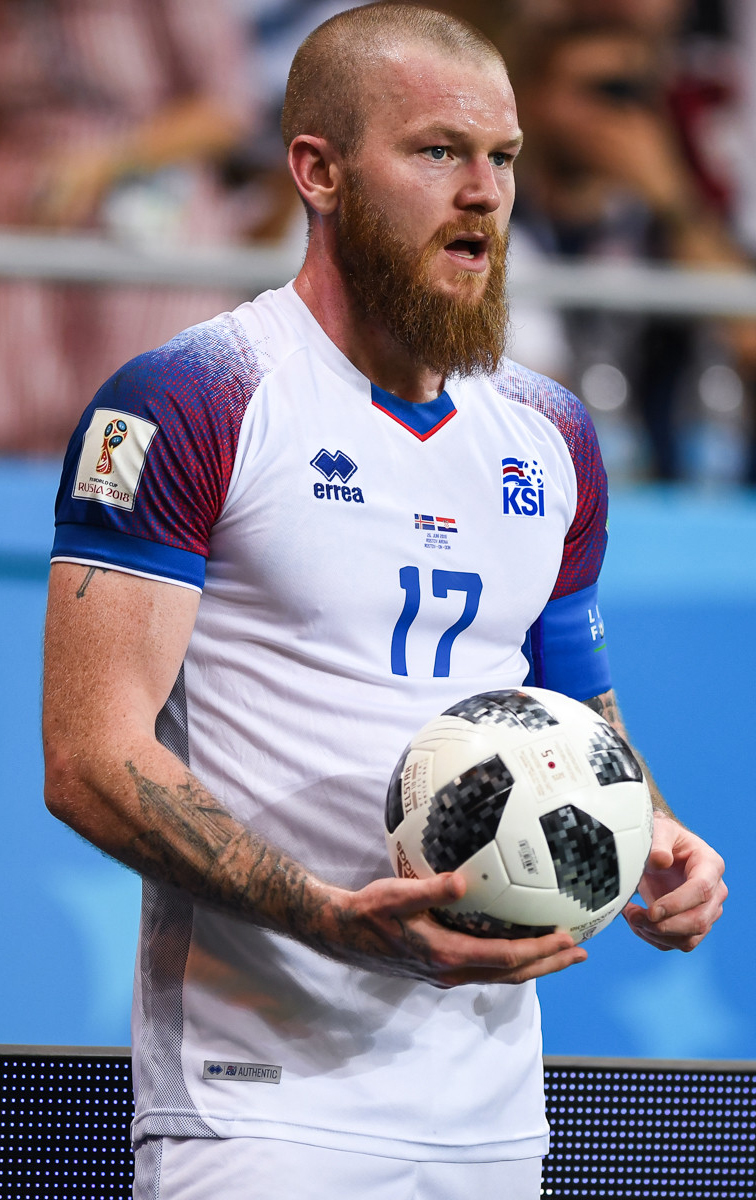
- Aron playing for Iceland at the 2018 FIFA World Cup

Personal information
- Full name: Aron Einar Malmquist Gunnarsson
- Date of birth: 22 April 1989 (age 37)
- Place of birth: Akureyri, Iceland
- Height: 1.81 m (5 ft 11 in)
- Position: Midfielder

Team information
- Current team: Qatar SC
- Number: 5

Youth career
- 2004–2005: Þór Akureyri

Senior career*
Years	Team	Apps	(Gls)
2005–2006	Þór Akureyri	11	(0)
2006–2008	AZ	1	(0)
2008–2011	Coventry City	122	(6)
2011–2019	Cardiff City	271	(25)
2019–2024	Al-Arabi	79	(7)
2024	Þór Akureyri	6	(1)
2024–2026	Al-Gharafa	18	(1)
2026	Þór Akureyri	1	(0)
2026–	Qatar SC	1	(1)

International career
2005	Iceland U17	7	(2)
2006–2008	Iceland U19	16	(1)
2007–2011	Iceland U21	11	(1)
2008–2026	Iceland	113	(5)
- * Club domestic league appearances and goals as of 27 August 2026

Aron Einar Malmquist Gunnarsson (born 22 April 1989) is an Icelandic professional footballer who plays for Qatar SC. He plays as a central midfielder, usually in a defensive capacity.

He began his career at Þór Akureyri, and played one match for Dutch club AZ before joining England's Coventry City in 2008. After 133 matches and seven goals in three seasons for them, he transferred to Cardiff City, where he was a runner-up in the 2012 Football League Cup final and played in the 2013–14 Premier League.

Aron represented Iceland at international level from 2008 to 2026, and is the team's joint record appearance holder alongside Birkir Bjarnason. He was Iceland's captain from 2012 to 2025, captaining the team to the quarter-finals at their first major tournament, UEFA Euro 2016.

== Club career ==
=== Early career ===
Born in Akureyri, Aron began playing football in his native Iceland on gravel pitches. During the winter months, snow and ice left football pitches unplayable and Aron instead played handball, making three appearances in the Icelandic handball League at the age of fifteen. He began his football career with local side Þór Akureyri in 2005 and, after investment in indoor pitches by the Icelandic government, began to train all year round. At the age of seventeen, Aron moved to the Netherlands, joining the youth academy at AZ. After initially struggling with homesickness, he settled in the country and made his debut for the club during the 2007–08 season.

=== Coventry City ===
Aron signed for English Championship team Coventry City on 17 June 2008, signing a three-year contract for an undisclosed fee. He made his debut on the opening day of the Championship season against Norwich City, where Coventry won 2–0. He scored his first career goal on 14 February 2009 in an FA Cup match against Premier League side Blackburn Rovers. During his time at Coventry, Aron attracted Premier League interest leading Coventry City to offer him an improved deal on 12 March. His first league goal came against Crystal Palace. At the end of his first season in England, Aron was voted the Coventry City Supporter's Player of the Year as well as the club's Community Award.

The following season, Aron changed his shirt number from 12 to 17, to mirror the squad number of his brother, who is a professional handball player. The following season, he continued as a vital part of the Coventry midfield, throughout the season he made 42 appearances and scored one goal against Middlesbrough.

Coventry City started the 2010–11 season strongly looking like they were pushing for play-off places. Aron opened his season's goal scoring count with a goal against newly promoted, Millwall, despite Coventry losing 3–1. After three years at Coventry, he scored his first goal at Coventry City's home ground, the Ricoh Arena, against Preston North End. Three days later, Aron scored his second goal in two matches against Doncaster Rovers. He was out of contract at the end of the season and on 10 December, Aron stated his desire to stay at Coventry. However the following week, he received his first red card of his career against Norwich City. However a deal for a new contract could not be reached between his agent and Coventry, and at the end of the season the club gave him a deadline date to agree to stay.

However, due to Aron and his agent not being able to reach an agreement with Coventry, he was linked with moves away and his agent confirmed that fellow Championship outfit Cardiff City were favourites to sign him.

=== Cardiff City ===
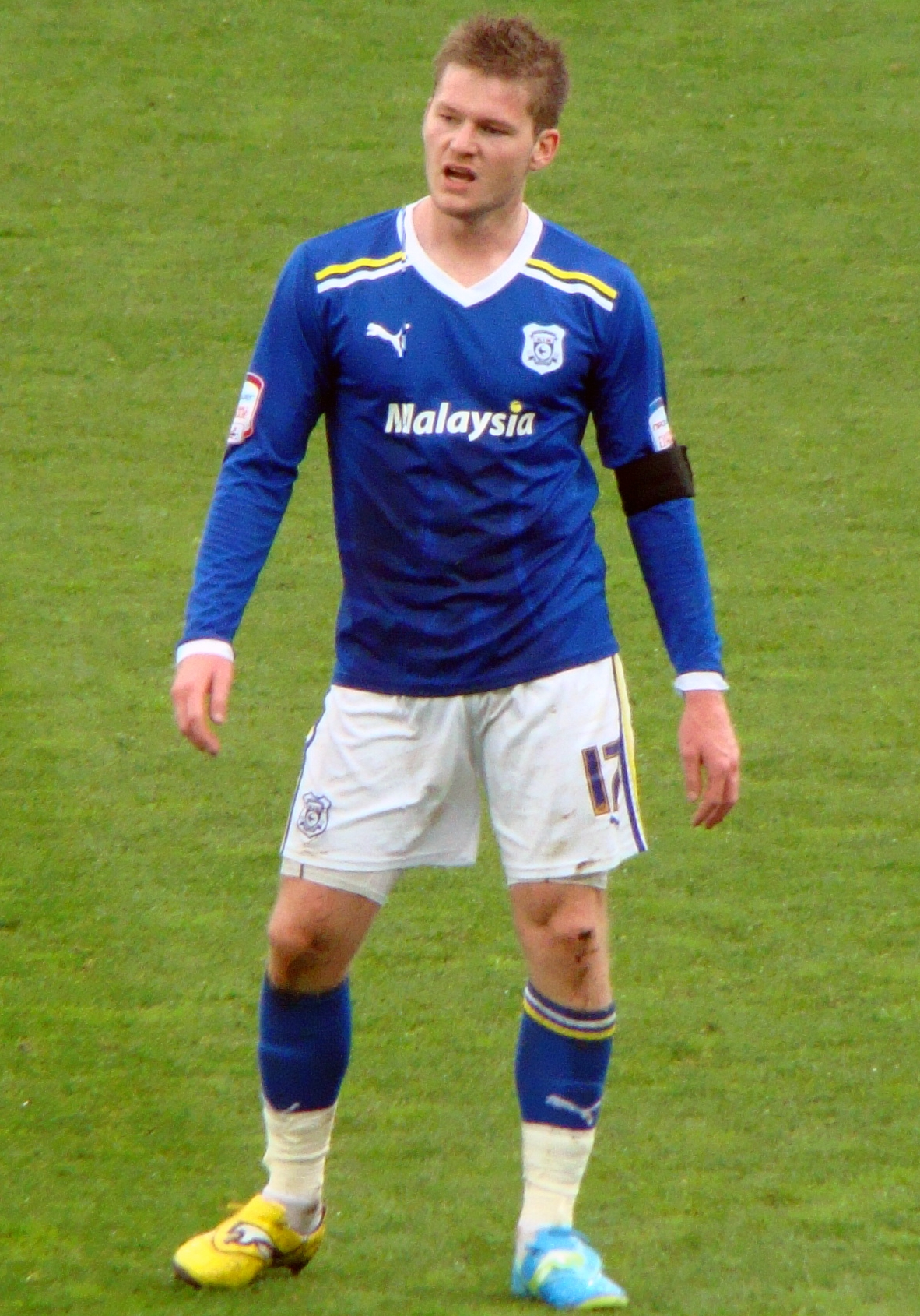
Aron playing for Cardiff City in 2012

On 8 July 2011, Aron agreed a three-year deal with fellow Championship team Cardiff City on a free transfer, as the fifth signing for new manager Malky Mackay. Coventry were due compensation via him being under the age of 24.

He made his debut on 7 August in the first match of the new season, playing the full 90 minutes in the 1–0 away win over West Ham United. In his second match, Aron limped off with an ankle injury after only ten minutes against Bristol City, the injury sidelining him for a week. He returned after the September international break, insisting his injury was behind him. On 22 October, Aron scored two goals in a 5–3 victory against Barnsley, receiving the man of the match award.

Aron played the entirety of the 2012 Football League Cup final, as City were beaten 3–2 on penalties after by Premier League club Liverpool at Wembley Stadium.

Aron scored Cardiff's first goal in the Premier League on 25 August 2013, against Manchester City in a 3–2 win. In June 2015 he signed a new contract with the club, until the summer of 2018.

Following his return from Euro 2016, Aron was linked with a move away from the Welsh capital, with Derby County and Norwich City claimed to be interested. However, Cardiff City manager, Paul Trollope, described him as "a very important player" to the club. His performances under Trollope and his eventual replacement Neil Warnock saw him awarded the club's Player of the Year award at the end of the season.

The following season, Aron failed to nail down a consistent place in the starting eleven, due to a number of injuries throughout the first half of the season. Despite his injury problems, Cardiff offered him a new contract, which was later rejected by the player. Aron returned to the side for the final run-in, where he scored the winning goal against Nottingham Forest and ultimately helped Cardiff gain promotion to the Premier League.

In July 2018, Aron signed a new one-year deal.

=== Al-Arabi ===
In March 2019, it was announced that Aron would leave Cardiff at the end of the season, and would join Qatar Stars League club Al-Arabi. In July 2019, he joined Al-Arabi. In June 2022, he extended his contract by an additional year.

=== Þór ===
On 1 August 2024, it was announced that Aron would be joining his boyhood club Þór Akureyri, signing an 18-month long deal.

=== Al-Gharafa ===
In September 2024, Aron signed with Al-Gharafa in Qatar.

=== Return to Þór ===
On 17 July 2026, Aron signed back with Þór.

=== Qatar SC ===
However, after only one month back in Iceland, Aron signed a contract with Qatari club Qatar SC on a contract for the 2026–27 season.

== International career ==
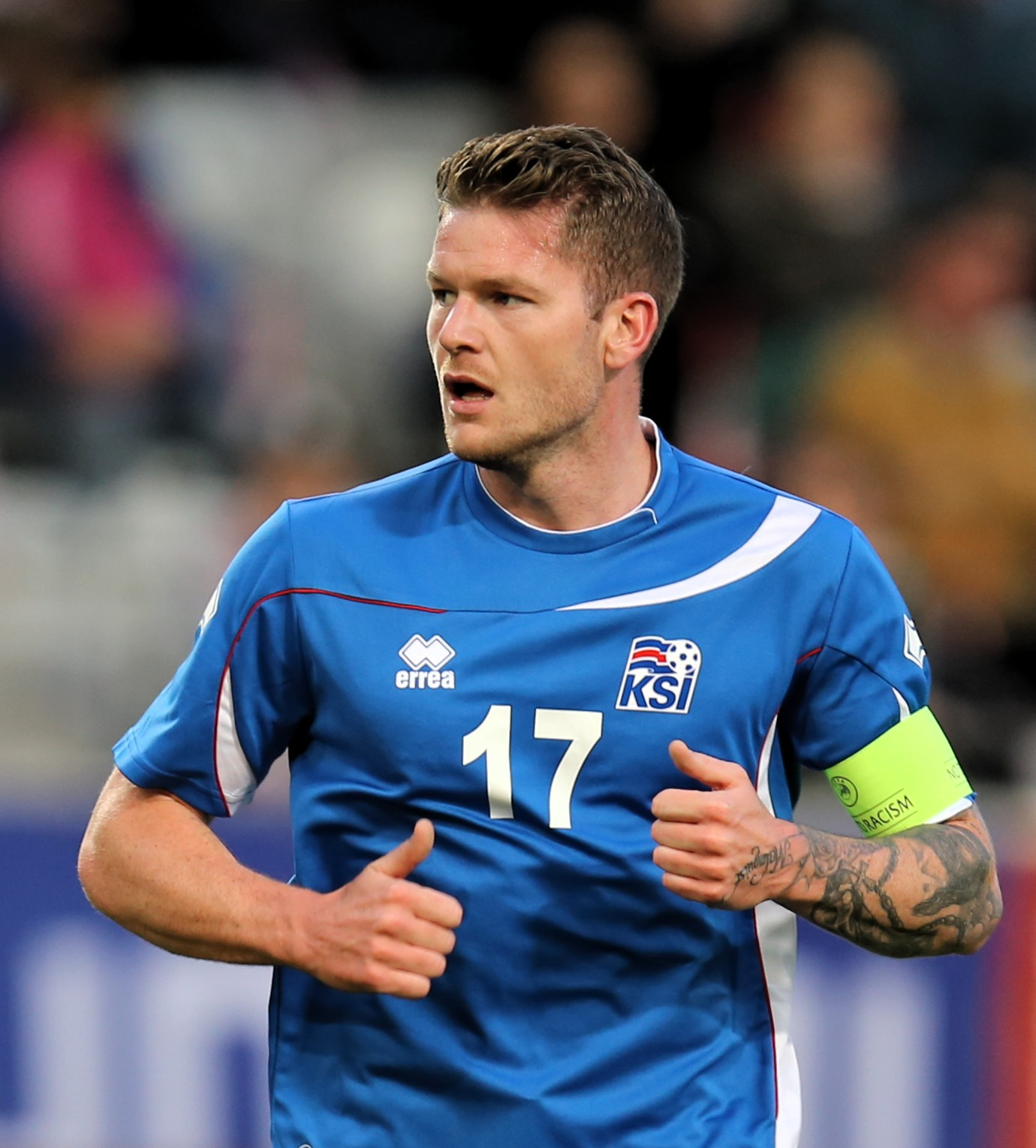
Aron playing for Iceland in 2012.

Aron made his international debut for Iceland on 2 February 2008. Aron was called up to the 2011 European Under-21 Championship Iceland squad, which took place in Denmark. In the first match, Iceland beat hosts Denmark 3–1. This was followed with a 2–0 loss to Belarus, where Aron was sent off. The two losses saw Iceland go out of the tournament via a tie breaker. Aron has been a regular player in the senior side since debuting despite helping the U-21 side when they qualified for the UEFA Under-21 Championship.

Aron was named as the permanent captain of the national team before a friendly match against the Faroe Islands in August 2012 at the young age of 23, ahead of his 29th cap. Under his captaincy, Iceland qualified for the play-off round of FIFA World Cup qualification for the first time, where they lost 2–0 on aggregate to Croatia.

On 10 October 2014, Aron scored his first senior international goal in Iceland's 3–0 away win against Latvia in UEFA Euro 2016 qualifying. He scored again in a 2–1 defeat of the Czech Republic on 12 June 2015. On 6 September, he was sent off in the last minute of a goalless draw at Laugardalsvöllur in Reykjavík against Kazakhstan, a result which put Iceland into their first major international tournament.

Aron captained Iceland at their first major international tournament, UEFA Euro 2016 in France. After their first match, a shock 1–1 draw with Portugal in Saint-Étienne, opposing skipper Cristiano Ronaldo accepted to trade shirts with him in the dressing room. Iceland finished second in their group, after beating Austria and drawing against Hungary, and then knocked out England in the round of 16. They were defeated by France, 5–2, in the quarter-final. Aron played in all five games.

In May 2018, he was named in Iceland's 23-man squad for the 2018 World Cup in Russia. On 6 November 2022, he played his 100th match for Iceland in a friendly match against Saudi Arabia.

On 26 March 2023, Aron scored his first ever hat-trick for Iceland on his 101st appearance in a 7–0 away win against Liechtenstein in a UEFA Euro 2024 qualifying fixture, to be the oldest hat-trick scorer for his country, having previously scored twice in his first 100 appearances for Iceland.

On 12 March 2025, new manager Arnar Gunnlaugsson opted to transfer the captaincy from Aron to Orri Óskarsson, citing that he felt it was right for a player in the younger generation of the national team to take on the role.

On 22 September 2026, it was announced Aron would retire from international football following the conclusion of Iceland's Nations League campaign. He made his final appearance for the national team in the last match of the competition against Luxembourg on 16 November 2026, as Iceland were promoted to League B. In doing so, he equalled Birkir Bjarnason's appearance record.

== Personal life ==
His older brother Arnór Þór Gunnarsson plays handball for the Icelandic national team.

== Career statistics ==
=== Club ===
As of 2 August 2024

Appearances and goals by club, season and competition
Club	Season	League			National cup (Note: Includes Icelandic Cup, FA Cup, Emir Cup)		League cup (Note: Includes Icelandic League Cup, Football League Cup, Qatari Stars Cup)		Other		Total	
Club	Season	Division	Apps	Goals	Apps	Goals	Apps	Goals	Apps	Goals	Apps	Goals
Þór Akureyri	2005	1. deild karla	5	0	1	0	5	0	—		11	0
Þór Akureyri	2006	1. deild karla	6	0	3	0	3	0	—		12	0
Þór Akureyri	Total		11	0	4	0	8	0	—		23	0
AZ	2006–07	Eredivisie	0	0	—		—		—		0	0
AZ	2007–08	Eredivisie	1	0	—		—		—		1	0
AZ	Total		1	0	—		—		—		1	0
Coventry City	2008–09	Championship	40	1	5	1	2	0	—		47	2
Coventry City	2009–10	Championship	40	1	2	0	0	0	—		42	1
Coventry City	2010–11	Championship	42	4	2	0	0	0	—		45	4
Coventry City	Total		122	6	9	1	2	0	—		133	7
Cardiff City	2011–12	Championship	42	5	0	0	6	0	2 (Note: Appearances in Championship play-offs)	0	50	5
Cardiff City	2012–13	Championship	45	8	0	0	0	0	—		45	8
Cardiff City	2013–14	Premier League	23	1	2	0	0	0	—		25	1
Cardiff City	2014–15	Championship	45	4	1	0	2	0	—		48	4
Cardiff City	2015–16	Championship	28	2	0	0	1	0	—		29	2
Cardiff City	2016–17	Championship	40	3	0	0	1	0	—		41	3
Cardiff City	2017–18	Championship	20	1	0	0	0	0	—		20	1
Cardiff City	2018–19	Premier League	28	1	0	0	0	0	—		28	1
Cardiff City	Total		271	25	3	0	10	0	2	0	286	25
Al Arabi	2019–20	Qatar Stars League	17	2	—		2	0	—		19	2
Al Arabi	2020–21	Qatar Stars League	20	2	3	0	2	0	2 (Note: Appearances in Qatar FA Cup)	1	27	3
Al Arabi	2021–22	Qatar Stars League	21	2	1	0	6	1	2	0	30	3
Al Arabi	2022–23	Qatar Stars League	21	1	4	1	0	0	0	0	25	2
Al Arabi	2023–24	Qatar Stars League	0	0	0	0	0	0	1	0	1	0
Al Arabi	Total		79	7	8	1	10	1	5	1	102	10
Þór Akureyri	2024	1. deild karla	0	0	0	0	0	0	—		0	0
Career total			484	41	21	1	30	1	6	1	545	42

=== International ===
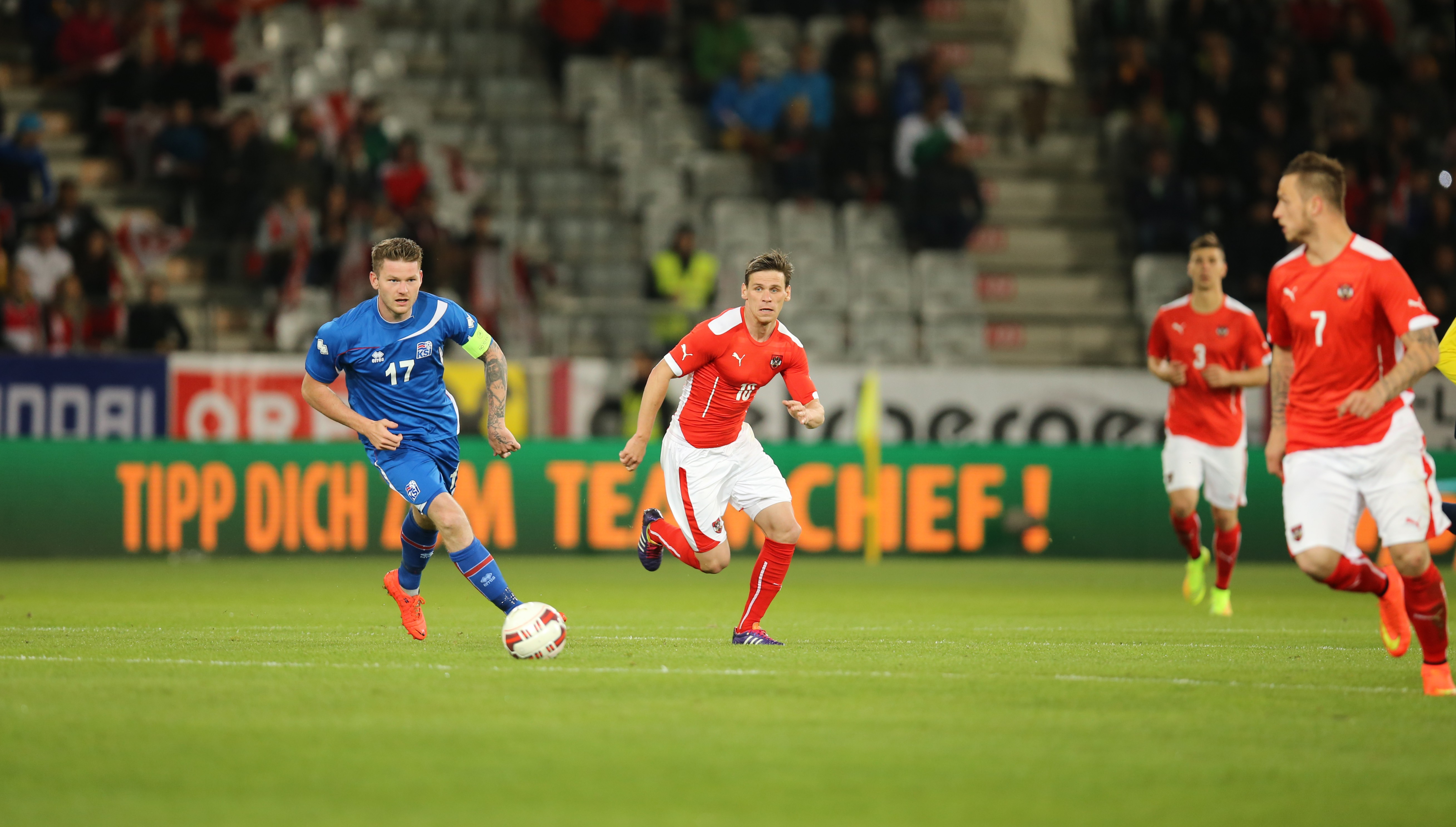
Aron (left) playing for Iceland in 2014

Appearances and goals by national team and year
National team	Year	Apps	Goals
Iceland	2008	9	0
Iceland	2009	7	0
Iceland	2010	5	0
Iceland	2011	4	0
Iceland	2012	8	0
Iceland	2013	8	0
Iceland	2014	8	1
Iceland	2015	6	1
Iceland	2016	13	0
Iceland	2017	8	0
Iceland	2018	5	0
Iceland	2019	6	0
Iceland	2020	4	0
Iceland	2021	6	0
Iceland	2022	3	0
Iceland	2023	3	3
Iceland	2024	1	0
Iceland	2025	3	0
Iceland	2026	6	0
Total		113	5

Scores and results list Iceland's goal tally first, score column indicates score after each Aron goal.

List of international goals scored by Aron Gunnarsson
No.	Date	Venue	Opponent	Score	Result	Competition	Ref.
1	10 October 2014	Skonto Stadium, Riga, Latvia	Latvia	2–0	3–0	UEFA Euro 2016 qualifying	
2	12 June 2015	Laugardalsvöllur, Reykjavík, Iceland	Czech Republic	1–1	2–1	UEFA Euro 2016 qualifying	
3	26 March 2023	Rheinpark Stadion, Vaduz, Liechtenstein	Liechtenstein	3–0	7–0	UEFA Euro 2024 qualifying	
4	26 March 2023	Rheinpark Stadion, Vaduz, Liechtenstein	Liechtenstein	4–0	7–0	UEFA Euro 2024 qualifying	
5	26 March 2023	Rheinpark Stadion, Vaduz, Liechtenstein	Liechtenstein	5–0	7–0	UEFA Euro 2024 qualifying	

== Honours ==
Cardiff City

- Football League/EFL Championship: 2012–13; runner-up: 2017–18
- Football League Cup runner-up: 2011–12

== See also ==
- List of men's footballers with 100 or more international caps
