= UEFA Euro 2032 bids =

Bids for 19th European Championship

The bidding process for the UEFA Euro 2032 was the process by which the location for the 19th European Championship, commonly referred to as Euro 2032, was selected.

== Hosting requirements ==
Bid requirements must contain specific criteria relating to the respect of human rights, based on the United Nations "Guiding Principles on Business and Human Rights".

The tournament is expected to continue the format of the 2016, 2020, 2024 and 2028 editions, with a total of 51 matches taking place for a duration of up to 32 days, with 24 teams competing in the tournament.

The required capacities for the ten stadiums are as follows:

- 1 stadium with 60,000 seats
- 1 stadium (preferably 2) with 50,000 seats
- 4 stadiums with 40,000 seats
- 3 stadiums with 30,000 seats

== Schedule ==
Date	Notes
27 September 2021	Applications formally invited
23 March 2022, 18:00 CET	Closing date for registering intention to bid
30 March 2022	Bid requirements made available to bidders
5 April 2022	Announcement of bidders
28 April 2022	Opening workshop for bidders
16 November 2022	Submission of preliminary bid dossier
12 April 2023	Submission of final bid dossier
10 October 2023	Bid presentation and announcement of host

== Bids ==
=== Confirmed plan to bid ===
==== Italy and Turkey ====
Italy stadia map

Italy – In February 2019, Italian Football Federation (FIGC) President Gabriele Gravina told Sky Sport Italia that the federation was considering a bid. The bid was further promoted by Gravina himself in July 2021, following Italy's final victory at UEFA Euro 2020. In February 2022, the FIGC announced that they would withdraw their original bid for Euro 2028 to focus on the 2032 edition, as it would allow more time to invest on stadiums and facilities. On 17 November 2022, the FIGC presented their preliminary bid dossier for Euro 2032, revealing a shortlist of eleven cities involved in the organization (Milan, Turin, Verona, Genoa, Bologna, Florence, Rome, Naples, Bari, Cagliari and Palermo). In April 2023, the FIGC submitted their final bid dossier to UEFA, confirming the direct involvement of all the aforementioned cities, except for Palermo.

- Milan – San Siro, capacity 75,817
- Turin – Juventus Stadium, capacity 41,507
- Verona – Stadio Marcantonio Bentegodi, capacity 39,371 (to be renovated)
- Genoa – Stadio Luigi Ferraris, capacity 36,205 (to be renovated)
- Bologna – Stadio Renato Dall'Ara, capacity 38,279 (to be renovated)
- Florence – Stadio Artemio Franchi, capacity 43,147 (to be renovated)
- Rome – Stadio Olimpico, capacity 70,634
- Naples – Stadio Diego Armando Maradona, capacity 54,726 (to be renovated)
- Bari – Stadio San Nicola, capacity 58,270 (to be renovated)
- Cagliari – Unipol Domus, capacity 25,000, expandable to 30,000 (new stadium)
Turkey stadia map

Turkey – On 15 August 2019, the Turkish Football Federation (TFF) announced that Turkey will bid to host Euro 2032. The Federation confirmed the submission of its application on 23 March 2022. Turkey's bid is the seventh consecutive bid of the country, having bid in 2008, 2012, 2016, 2020, 2024 and 2028. On 12 April 2023, TFF revealed a list 10 stadiums for this bid:

- Istanbul – Atatürk Olympic Stadium, capacity 74,753
- Istanbul – Rams Park, capacity 53,611
- Istanbul – Ülker Stadium, capacity 47,834
- Ankara – New Ankara 19 Mayıs Stadium, capacity 45,000
- Bursa – Sütaş Timsah Park, capacity 43,331
- Konya – Medaş Konya Büyükşehir Stadyumu, capacity 42,000
- Trabzon – Şenol Güneş Sports Complex, capacity 40,782
- Antalya – Corendon Airlines Park, capacity 32,537
- Eskişehir – Atatürk Stadium, capacity 32,500
- Gaziantep – Kalyon Stadium, capacity 33,502

==== Italy and Turkey joint bid ====
On 28 July 2023, UEFA announced that the FIGC and the TFF had requested to merge their bids into one joint bid to host UEFA EURO 2032. The new bid was subject to further examinations to determine whether it was ready to get submitted to the UEFA Executive Committee at the meeting scheduled on 10 October, where the appointments for 2028 and 2032 were set to be made.

=== Ineligible bids ===
- Russia – On 12 June 2021, Alexej Sorokin, the organizing committee director of Euro 2020 host Saint Petersburg, proposed an application from Russia for Euro 2028 or 2032. This was reaffirmed on 23 March 2022, the deadline for bids. On 2 May 2022, UEFA declared their bids for 2028 and 2032 as ineligible due to the 2022 Russian invasion of Ukraine, citing that it breaches article 16.2 of the Bid Regulations, which state "each bidder shall ensure that it does not act in a manner that could bring UEFA, any other bidder, the bidding procedure or European football into disrepute".
