= UEFA Euro 2028 bids =

Bids for the 18th European Championship

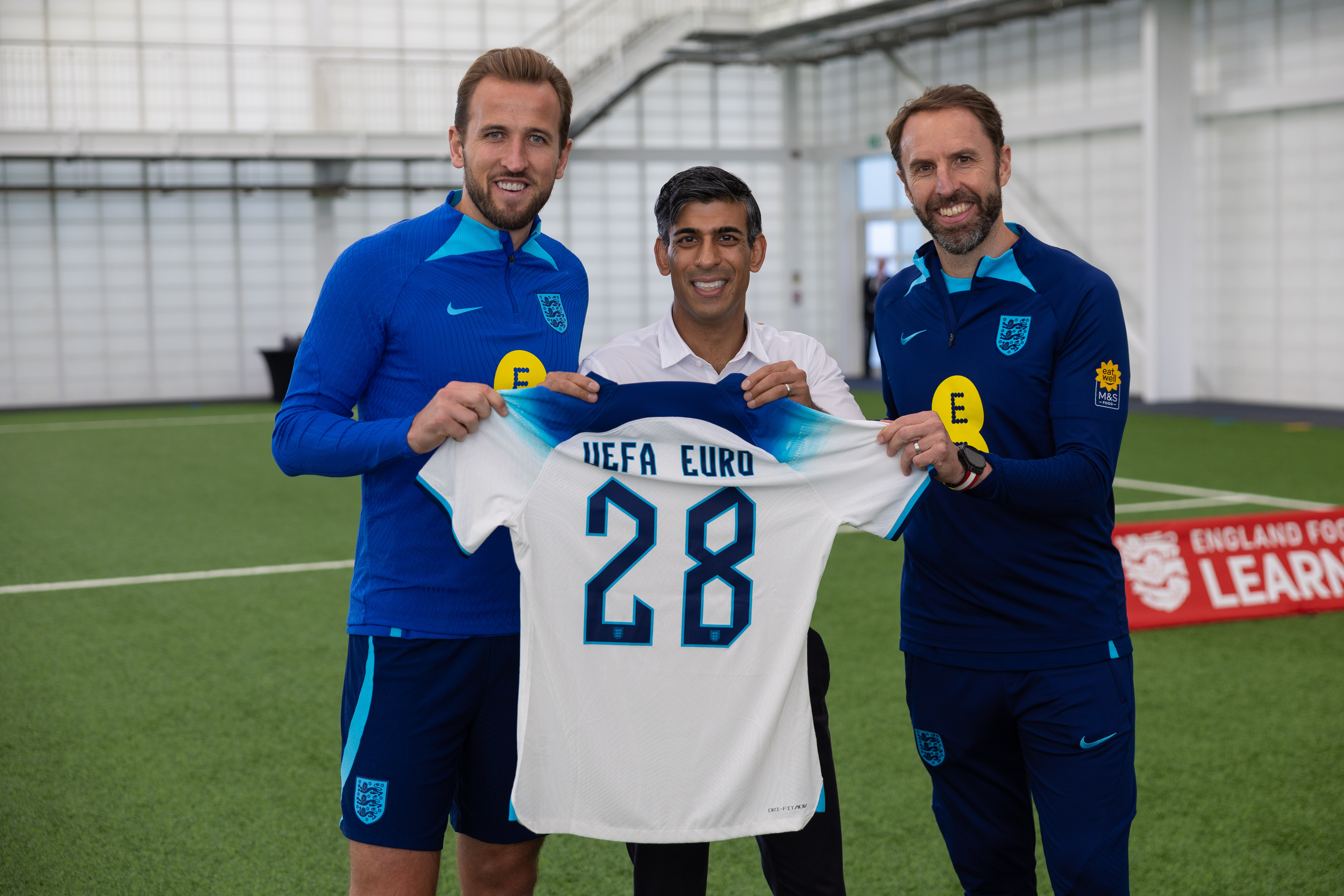
The then-UK Prime Minister Rishi Sunak (centre), with England captain Harry Kane (left) and then-England manager Gareth Southgate (right), at St George's Park, in October 2023

The bidding process for UEFA Euro 2028 was the process by which the location for the 18th European Championship, commonly referred to as Euro 2028, has been selected.

== Hosting requirements ==
Bid requirements must contain specific criteria relating to the respect of human rights, based on the United Nations "Guiding Principles on Business and Human Rights".

The tournament is expected to follow the format of the 2016, 2020 and 2024 editions, with a total of 51 matches taking place for a duration of up to 32 days, with 24 teams competing in the tournament.

The required capacities for the ten stadiums were as follows:

- 1 stadium with 60,000 seats
- 1 stadium (preferably 2) with 50,000 seats
- 4 stadiums with 40,000 seats
- 3 stadiums with 30,000 seats

== Schedule ==
Date	Notes
27 September 2021	Applications formally invited
23 March 2022, 18:00 CET	Closing date for registering intention to bid
30 March 2022	Bid requirements made available to bidders
5 April 2022	Announcement of bidders
28 April 2022	Opening workshop for bidders
16 November 2022	Submission of preliminary bid dossier
12 April 2023	Submission of final bid dossier
10 October 2023	Bid presentation and announcement of host

== Bids ==
=== Confirmed bids ===
==== England, Northern Ireland, Republic of Ireland, Scotland, and Wales ====
Host cities and venues of UEFA Euro 2028

- England
- 1 2 London
- 3 Birmingham
- 4 Liverpool
- 5 Manchester
- 6 Newcastle
- Wales
- 7 Cardiff
- Scotland
- 8 Glasgow
- Northern Ireland
- 9 Belfast
- Ireland
  10 Dublin

England, Northern Ireland, Republic of Ireland, Scotland, and Wales – On 5 January 2022, the football associations of England, Northern Ireland, Scotland, Wales and the Republic of Ireland announced a joint Ireland and Home Nations bid for the UEFA Euro 2028, which meant their own 2030 World Cup bid would be unsustainable. The five associations confirmed on 7 February that they would drop their 2030 interest and would instead focus on Euro 2028. On 5 March 2022, media outlets in Ireland and UK erroneously reported that the Ireland and UK bid would be the sole remaining bid, with Turkey set to withdraw its bid, and Russia barred from applying.

On 12 April 2023, the 10 host stadiums were revealed:

- London, England – Wembley Stadium, capacity 90,652
- Cardiff, Wales – Millennium Stadium, capacity 73,952
- Glasgow, Scotland – Hampden Park, capacity 65,000 (stadium to be reconstructed)
- London, England – Tottenham Hotspur Stadium, capacity 62,322
- Manchester, England – City of Manchester Stadium, capacity 61,958 (capacity to be expanded 2023–26)
- Liverpool, England – Everton Stadium, capacity 52,679
- Newcastle upon Tyne, England – St James' Park, capacity 52,305
- Birmingham, England – Villa Park, capacity 52,190 (capacity to be expanded)
- Dublin, Republic of Ireland – Aviva Stadium, capacity 51,711
- Belfast, Northern Ireland – Casement Park, proposed capacity 34,500

The stadium shortlist as of 16 November 2022 included 14 host stadiums. The four stadiums not on the final list were:

- Dublin, Republic of Ireland – Croke Park, capacity 82,300
- London, England – London Stadium, capacity 66,000
- Manchester, England – Old Trafford, capacity 74,310
- Sunderland, England – Stadium of Light, capacity 49,000

=== Previously expressed interest in bidding ===
These countries previously expressed interest in bidding, but did not submit a bid:

- Denmark, Faroe Islands, Finland, Iceland, Norway and Sweden – On 4 March 2016, the Danish Football Association announced preparation of a joint bid together with the FAs of Sweden, Norway and Finland for Euro 2028 plus events in the Faroe Islands and Iceland.
- Portugal and Spain – On 12 September 2018, the Royal Spanish Football Federation announced intentions of a joint bid together with the Portuguese Football Federation for Euro 2028 or the 2030 World Cup.
- Bulgaria, Greece, Romania and Serbia

At the meeting in February 2019 of the Ministers of Youth and Sports of Romania (Constantin Bogdan Matei); Bulgaria (Krasen Kralev); Serbia (Vanja Udovičić) and Deputy Minister of Culture and Sports of Greece (Giorgos Vasileiadis), it was officially confirmed that these four countries would submit joint candidacy for the organisation of the Euro 2028 and 2030 FIFA World Cup.

=== Abandoned bids ===
==== Italy ====
Italy – In February 2019, Italian Football Federation President Gabriele Gravina told Sky Sport Italia that the federation was considering a bid. The bid was proposed again by Gravina some few days after Italy's win at Euro 2020. In February 2022, the Italian federation announced it would bid for Euro 2032, instead of 2028, as it would allow them more time to redevelop facilities.

==== Turkey ====
Turkey – On 15 August 2019, the Türkiye Football Federation announced that Turkey would bid to host Euro 2028. The Federation confirmed the submission of its application on 23 March 2022. Turkey's bid is the sixth consecutive bid of the country, having been unsuccessful on the previous five occasions (2008, 2012, 2016, 2020, and 2024). On 12 April 2023, TFF revealed a list 10 stadiums for both 2028 and 2032 bids:

Turkey venue map
- Istanbul – Atatürk Olympic Stadium, capacity 74,753
- Istanbul – Rams Park, capacity 53,611
- Istanbul – Ülker Stadium, capacity 47,834
- Ankara – New Ankara 19 Mayıs Stadium, capacity 45,000
- Bursa – Sütaş Timsah Park, capacity 43,331
- Konya – Medaş Konya Büyükşehir Stadyumu, capacity 42,000
- Trabzon – Şenol Güneş Sports Complex, capacity 40,782
- Antalya – Corendon Airlines Park, capacity 32,537
- Eskişehir – Atatürk Stadium, capacity 32,500
- Gaziantep – Kalyon Stadium, capacity 33,502

On 28 July 2023, UEFA received request from TFF and FIGC to merge their 2032 hosting bids into a combined bid. On 4 October 2023 - it was announced that Turkey had withdrawn their bid.

=== Ineligible bids ===
- Russia – On 12 June 2021, Alexej Sorokin, the organising committee director of Euro 2020 host Saint Petersburg, proposed an application from Russia for Euro 2028 or 2032. This was reaffirmed on 23 March 2022, the deadline for bids. On 2 May 2022, UEFA declared their bids for 2028 and 2032 as ineligible due to the 2022 Russian invasion of Ukraine, citing that it breaches article 16.2 of the Bid Regulations, which state "each bidder shall ensure that it does not act in a manner that could bring UEFA, any other bidder, the bidding procedure or European football into disrepute".
