= Vardzelashvili =

Vardzelashvili is a Georgian surname ვარძელაშვილი. Notable people with the surname include:

- Besarion Vardzelashvili
- Konstantine Vardzelashvili (born 1972), Georgian jurist
- Vladimir Vardzelashvili (born 1979), Georgian politician
