= Casement Park =

Gaelic games stadium in Belfast

- Páirc Mhic Asmaint

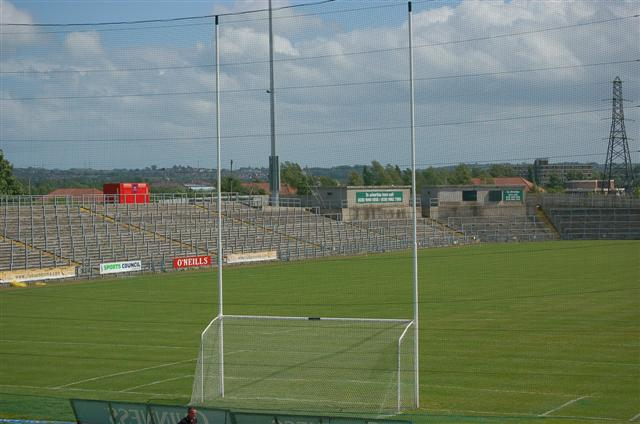
- Casement Park in 2007

- Location within Greater Belfast
- Full name: Roger Casement Park
- Address: 88–104 Andersonstown Road, Belfast, County Antrim, BT11 9AN
- Location: Northern Ireland
- Coordinates: 54°34′24″N 5°59′2″W
- Owner: Antrim GAA
- Capacity: c. 31,500 (as of 2010)
- Field size: 145 x 90 m
- Public transit: Balmoral railway station

Construction
- Opened: 1953
- Renovated: 2000
- Closed: June 2013

Website
- https://www.casementpark.ie/

Casement Park (Irish: Páirc Mhic Asmaint) was the principal Gaelic games stadium in Belfast, Northern Ireland. It is located in Andersonstown Road in the west of the city, and is named after the Irish revolutionary Roger Casement.

The stadium, which has been closed since June 2013, previously had a capacity of approximately 31,500. While previously serving as the home ground of the Antrim hurling and Gaelic football teams, it was in a state of dereliction by 2021, with redevelopment plans pending for several years. Though planning permission for the redevelopment of Casement Park was confirmed in July 2021, by March 2023, it remained closed.

A combined bid to host UEFA Euro 2028, by the Republic of Ireland and England, Northern Ireland, Scotland and Wales, included a proposal to redevelop the stadium. While, by March 2024, some demolition work had commenced, as of September 2024 it was reported that the redevelopment would not be funded or completed in time for the 2028 competition, which caused the stadium to be removed from hosting duties.

== History ==
Casement Park, one of the largest stadiums in Northern Ireland, was built in the years following World War II, with the main stand reportedly incorporating steel reclaimed from disused military aircraft hangars in County Fermanagh.

It was named after Roger Casement, an Irish revolutionary who was executed in 1916 for his role in the Easter Rising.

The ground opened in June 1953, with Armagh Harps defeating St John's of Antrim in the final of the inaugural Ulster Senior Club Football Championship. The newly opened Casement Park hosted the Ulster Championship final less than a month later, which saw Armagh overcome reigning All-Ireland champions Cavan.

The ground's location in a republican neighbourhood saw incidents during the Troubles which contributed to unionist perception of the Gaelic Athletic Association (GAA) as pro-republican. Rallies against the introduction of internment were held on 12 September 1971 and 19 March 1972. The ground was occupied by the British Army from Operation Motorman on 31 July 1972 until October 1973. Provisional IRA members displayed weapons at a rally there in August 1979. In March 1988, two Army corporals who drove into a republican funeral cortège were beaten in Casement Park before being killed on nearby waste ground. Anniversaries of the 1981 hunger strike were marked by rallies at the stadium in 2001 and 2006, against the wishes of the GAA Central Council.

In all, Casement Park has hosted eight Ulster football finals. However, the Antrim ground has not held the provincial final since 1971, with St. Tiernach's Park in Clones hosting the final every year since except between 2004 and 2006 when it was moved to Croke Park, such was the demand for tickets. A major facelift of the stadium in 2000 saw more championship games played at Casement Park. Floodlights were added in 2006.

The stadium hosted a match for the last time on 10 June 2013, which was the 2013 Ulster Senior Football Championship quarter-final between Antrim and Monaghan.

In November 2016, Casement Park was included as part of the Irish Rugby Football Union's, ultimately unsuccessful, bid to host the 2023 Rugby World Cup. The stadium was also included in Northern Ireland's joint UEFA Euro 2028 bid.

== Redevelopment ==
=== Proposals ===
In 2006, it was proposed to build a new multi-purpose stadium on the site of the old Maze prison near Lisburn, which was intended to host association football, rugby union and Gaelic games. However, opposition to the idea led to it being dropped in favour of a venue in the Sydenham area of Belfast. This led to Ulster GAA, one of the partners in the Maze project, to pull out in favour of remaining at Casement Park.

While plans to redevelop Casement Park were announced in 2009, it was not until 2011 that the Northern Ireland Executive stated that it had allocated £61.4m to redevelop Casement into a 40,000 all-seated stadium. A further £15 million was proposed from the Gaelic Athletic Association. If developed as planned, the stadium would have been the largest in Ulster. In early 2012, it was suggested that this redevelopment would commence at the end of 2013 with a view to opening by September 2015. It was expected that, after completion, Ulster GAA would move its headquarters from St Tiernach's Park in Clones to the redeveloped Casement Park.

Local residents of West Belfast objected to the proposal and in September 2013 the Mooreland and Owenvarragh Residents Association (MORA) issued a petition and letter of objection to the Northern Ireland Department of Environment, describing the new stadium plans "a monstrosity". The residents filed a lawsuit and the date for the commencement of construction continued to be delayed. In December 2014, the High Court ruled a ministerial decision granting planning approval for the redevelopment of the stadium had been unlawful. Ulster GAA responded with disappointment to the decision and re-submitted a scaled-back design in October 2016. This updated proposal had a reduced capacity of 34,500. This design didn't obtain planning approval, as Northern Ireland's power-sharing government was dissolved in March 2017. This delay saw the anticipated total cost of the project increase to approximately £110 million.

Antrim's 14 point "home" loss to Tyrone in the 2019 Ulster Senior Football Championship quarter-final in Armagh highlighted the run-down status of the Casement Park pitch and grandstands. The GAA stated it was hopeful of receiving planning permission for the redevelopment in mid-Spring 2020. This eventually came in October 2020 when Minister for Infrastructure Nichola Mallon recommended planning approval. As of 2020, the stadium was speculated to open in summer 2023, while the project still faced funding uncertainties.

In July 2021, planning permission for the redevelopment of Casement Park was confirmed. At that time, the redevelopment project (including a proposed capacity of 34,578) was expected to commence in early 2022 and to take two years. However, the planning approval was subject to a High Court review, and in May 2022 an appeal against the stadium's redevelopment was rejected by the court, with work then projected to begin during 2023 for "complet[ion] in 2025".

In November 2023, after the previous contractor went into administration, the GAA stated that it was seeking a new primary contractor for the redevelopment project. At that time, the architecture firm which had previously been engaged, Populous, was reportedly "still involved".

=== UEFA Euro 2028 issues ===
One of multiple artist impressions, from 2024, of a possible redesign

==== Background ====
In March 2023, the GAA announced that, if redeveloped as proposed under the July 2021 proposal, it would give special permission (under Rule 42) for Casement Park to be included in a joint UK and Ireland bid to host the UEFA Euro 2028 Championship. The bid, which was chosen in October 2023, proposed that Casement Park would be the sole host stadium in Northern Ireland.

In early 2024, clearance work began at the start of the redevelopment project. This included some demolition work on the stadium's former concrete terracing.

==== Unionist protests ====
The inclusion of Casement Park instead of Windsor Park as the Northern Irish venue led to Unionist protests, due to Casement Park being a Gaelic games stadium, traditional nationalist sports. Windsor Park, however, did not have a capacity large enough to comply with UEFA rules for hosting European Championship matches, which led to the selection of Casement Park. Windsor Park is located in a majority unionist area (with football being a traditional unionist sport), whereas Casement Park is located in a majority nationalist area and named for a revolutionary involved in the Easter Rising. Protests were held on the inclusion of Casement Park with the theme being that the protestors did not want to attend games at the venue, due to its history and location.

==== Funding problems ====
Casement Park's inclusion in the bid was subject to redevelopment work being completed. This work was subject to funding from the Northern Irish Devolved Government and the Gaelic Athletic Association, however it was hoped that the UK Government would also contribute following a successful bid.

It was reported, in June 2024, that detail of UK Government funding for the stadium would not be published until after the UK general election in July 2024. On 16 June 2024, Northern Ireland's First Minister Michelle O'Neill said that Casement Park would be built "on [her] watch".

On 13 September 2024, the UK Government announced it would not contribute to the proposed redevelopment, with the timeline being delayed and budget increased to £400 million (from the originally proposed £77.5 million), this impacted the hopes of Northern Ireland hosting any matches at the tournament. On 16 September 2024, Casement Park was dropped as a host venue.

=== Post Euro-withdrawal redevelopment ===
Following the withdrawal as a Euro Championship host stadium, the predicted redevelopment costs dropped to approximately £270 million, as the stadium no longer needed to comply with UEFA regulations. While, as of June 2025, the Stormont executive had proposed to contribute £62m to the proposed project, the British government had allocated £50m, the Irish government pledged £43m, and the GAA approximately £15m, a funding "shortfall" remained.

Demolition work on the existing stands and other structures of the stadium began in March 2026.

== See also ==
- List of Gaelic Athletic Association stadiums
- List of stadiums in Ireland by capacity
- Match for Michaela
