= UEFA Euro 2020 bids =

Football tournament hosting bids

The bidding process for the UEFA Euro 2020 is the process by which the location for the 16th European Championship, commonly referred to as Euro 2020, was selected. The process officially began on 21 March 2012 with the intent to announce the hosts in late 2013 or early 2014. Despite interest from Turkey, a joint bid from Scotland, the Republic of Ireland and Wales and a proposal from Georgia and Azerbaijan, UEFA announced on 6 December 2012 that it had made the unprecedented decision to host the tournament in multiple cities across Europe.

== Background ==
Euro 2020 (held in 2021 due to the COVID-19 pandemic) was the second tournament to involve 24 nations, following UEFA Euro 2016 five years previously.

== Initial bidding process ==
It was initially envisaged that the tournament would be contained within one, two or three countries. In the case of multiple countries hosting the tournament, these countries would have to share a border. Assuming no changes from the Euro 2016 bidding process, the basic hosting requirements were to be as follows:

- Only the 54 football associations affiliated to UEFA were eligible to host the tournament.
- Joint bids by two member associations were permitted and, under exceptional circumstances, joint bids by three member associations may have been considered.
- The stadium requirements for Euro 2016 were as set out below. However, Euro 2016 now used ten stadiums rather than the nine initially specified, so the 2020 bidding process could have adopted a new formula.
  - 2 stadiums with 50,000 seats
  - 3 stadiums with 40,000 seats
  - 4 stadiums with 30,000 seats

=== Schedule ===
On 21 March 2012, UEFA announced that the bidding process would be as set out below in the event that more than one expression of interest in bidding was received by UEFA before 15 May 2012. Without a second bid, UEFA stated that the hosts would be confirmed on 15 May, subject to the confederation receiving the necessary guarantees. On 16 May 2012, UEFA announced that, because more than one national association had submitted their interest, it would begin its formal selection process and would allow any of the 54 national federations to bid, even if they chose not to declare an interest prior to the deadline. The timeline for the rest of the procedure was announced by UEFA on 30 June 2012.

Phase	Date	Notes
First	21 March 2012	Declarations of interest formally invited
First	15 May 2012	Last date to submit a "letter of intent" to UEFA
Second	30 June 2012	UEFA to announce timeline for the rest of the bid process
Second	July / December 2012	UEFA will hold discussions with all national associations
Second	6 December 2012	Decision that Euro 2020 will be spread across the European continent
Second	28 March 2013	Approval of the bidding requirements and bid regulations
Second	April 2013	Publication of the bid requirements and launch of the bidding phase
Second	September 2013	Formal confirmation of their bid by the candidates
Second	April/May 2014	Submission of bid dossiers and start of the evaluation phase
Second	September 2014	Appointment of the host cities by the UEFA Executive Committee

=== Expressions of interest ===
Turkey, a joint Scottish, Irish and Welsh bid and an Azerbaijani-Georgian bid all formally confirmed their interest in hosting Euro 2020 with UEFA in the spring of 2012. The deadline for declarations of interest was at midnight on 15 May 2012, but UEFA announced that further bids were welcome on 16 May.

By and large, this was seen as a disappointing group of hosts to select from, especially as favourite for the bid Turkey favoured a bid to host the 2020 Summer Olympics in its largest city Istanbul, held in the same year and seen as an obstacle to the hosting of Euro 2020. UEFA President Michel Platini was previously reported to have promised the tournament to Turkey.

The Celtic (Scotland, Republic of Ireland and Wales) bid was a late bid that arose after the lack of interest throughout the rest of Europe, Turkey aside.

The Azerbaijani-Georgian coalition was doubted by some due to Azerbaijan's preference for a successful Baku bid for the 2020 Summer Olympics. On 15 May 2012, hours after the announcement of the three-way Irish, Scottish and Welsh bid, Georgian Sports Minister Vladimir Vardzelashvili announced his country's intention to declare an interest in hosting Euro 2020 alone. Nine days later, however, Azerbaijan notified UEFA that they planned to join forces with Georgia in a bid for Euro 2020 after Baku failed to make the IOC's shortlist as a contender to bid for the 2020 Olympic Games.

Several other nations made a less committed effort to the host the tournament, but never announced a firm interest. Among these were Belgium, a joint Bosnia and Herzegovina–Croatia–Serbia bid, a proposal from Romania alongside either Bulgaria or Hungary and sole bids from Germany and the Netherlands.

== Change to pan-European tournament format ==
On 30 June 2012, at a press conference a day before the UEFA Euro 2012 Final, UEFA President Michel Platini suggested that instead of having one host country (or joint hosting by multiple countries), Euro 2020 may be spread over "12 or 13 cities" across the continent. A similar system was in use for its male and female under-age competitions. On 6 December 2012, UEFA announced that the 2020 championships would be held in multiple cities all over Europe to mark 60 years of the tournament's existence. Platini reasoned that this was the logical decision at a time of financial difficulty across Europe.

=== Schedule of process ===
- 28 March 2013: Approval of the bidding requirements and bid regulations
- 26 April 2013: Publication of the bid regulations, bid requirements and launch of the bidding phase
- 12 September 2013: Formal confirmation of candidate cities by their respective football associations
- 20 September 2013: Announcement of candidate cities by the UEFA Executive Committee
- 25 April 2014: Submission of bid dossiers
- 19 September 2014: Appointment of the host cities by the UEFA Executive Committee

=== Venue selection ===
On 25 January 2013, the UEFA Executive Committee approved the principles of venue selection:

- Twelve cities would host four matches (the "Standard Package"), consisting of three group stage matches and one round of 16/quarter-final match. A 13th city would host the semi-finals and final (the "Finals Package"). Each city will use one venue only. Each association could bid for either or both of the above packages (same city or two different cities). However, a maximum of one city per country will be chosen.
- The minimum stadium capacities should be 70,000 for semi-finals/final, 60,000 for quarter-finals, and 50,000 for round of 16 and group matches. Up to two exceptions would be allowed for stadiums of a minimum capacity of 30,000, limited to group matches and a round of 16 match. Any projected stadiums had to start construction by 2016.
- For the group stage, a maximum of two host teams would be drawn into each group, with each qualified host team guaranteed to play two home matches in the group stage. However, there was no guarantee that a host team would play any knockout matches at home. The composition of teams in the group stage would still be subject to seeding and draw, but the allocation of host teams to each group would take into account of travel distances (flights between host cities in the same group could not exceed two hours).
- Each team which qualified for the finals could set up their base camp anywhere, without any obligation of staying in any of the host countries.
- Each host city had to have two airports, or two separate airport terminals at a single airport. This was to segregate rival fans.

In May 2013, UEFA President Michel Platini announced that his personal priority was to have the competition hosted at venues that have never hosted European Championship matches before.

=== Expressions of interest ===
The deadline for expressions of interest was 12 September 2013. On 20 September, UEFA confirmed expressions of interest from 32 football associations to act as host cities. Of the associations which had applied to host matches at Euro 2020, nineteen had not previously hosted the final stages of tournament, (labeled with *). Whilst neither Croatia or Serbia had hosted an international football tournament as independent countries, the Serbian and Croatian capitals both hosted finals matches for Euro 1976 as part of then Yugoslavia.

Expressed interest in bidding for Finals Package and Standard Package

- Belgium
  - Brussels – proposed new national stadium (potentially 60,000)
- England
  - London – Wembley Stadium (90,000)
- Germany
  - Munich – Allianz Arena (67,812)
- Spain
  - Madrid – Metropolitano Stadium (20,000, to be expanded up to 70,000)
  - Barcelona – RCDE Stadium (40,500)
  - Bilbao – San Mamés Barria (53,332)
  - Valencia – Nou Mestalla (75,100; under construction)
- Wales*
  - Cardiff – Millennium Stadium (74,500)

Expressed interest in bidding for Finals Package

- Turkey*
  - Istanbul – Atatürk Olympic Stadium (76,092)
- Ukraine
  - Kyiv – NSK Olimpiyskiy (70,050) for semi-finals/final

Expressed interest in bidding for Standard Package

- Armenia*
  - Yerevan – Hrazdan Stadium (54,208)
- Azerbaijan*
  - Baku – Baku Olympic Stadium (68,000; under construction)
- Belarus*
  - Minsk – Traktor Stadium (proposed renovation; to be expanded up to 33,000)
- Bulgaria*
  - Sofia – Vasil Levski National Stadium (43,230)
- Croatia
  - Zagreb – proposed new national stadium (55,000)
  - Split – Stadion Poljud (to be expanded to 50,000)
- Czech Republic*
  - Prague – proposed new national stadium
- Denmark*
  - Copenhagen – Parken Stadium (38,065)
- Finland*
  - Helsinki – Helsinki Olympic Stadium (37,500)
- France
  - Lyon – Parc Olympique Lyonnais (61,556)
- Greece*
  - Athens – Olympic Stadium (75,263)
- Hungary*
  - Budapest – Puskás Aréna (proposed new 67,889 stadium)
- Republic of Ireland*
  - Dublin – Aviva Stadium (51,700)
- Israel*
  - Jerusalem – Teddy Stadium (to be expanded to 53,000)
- Italy
  - Rome – Stadio Olimpico (72,698)
  - Milan – San Siro (80,018)
- Kazakhstan*
  - Astana – Astana Arena (30,000)
- Macedonia*
  - Skopje – Philip II Arena (33,460)
- Netherlands
  - Amsterdam – Amsterdam Arena (53,052; to be expanded to 55–56,000)
- Poland
  - Warsaw – National Stadium (58,145)
  - Chorzów – Stadion Śląski (54,477)
- Portugal
  - Lisbon – Estádio da Luz (65,647)
  - Porto – Estádio do Dragão (50,399)
- Romania*
  - Bucharest – Arena Națională (55,600)
- Russia*
  - Saint Petersburg – Krestovsky Stadium (69,500)
- Scotland*
  - Glasgow – Hampden Park (52,063)
- Serbia
  - Belgrade – Red Star Stadium (55,538) or proposed new national stadium
- Sweden
  - Solna, Stockholm – Friends Arena (50,000)
- Switzerland
  - Basel – St. Jakob-Park (38,512)
- Ukraine
  - Donetsk – Donbas Arena (52,518)

=== Withdrawn interest ===
The Finnish Football Association withdrew its bid on 4 March 2014 as redevelopments to its chosen venue, the Helsinki Olympic Stadium, will leave it below the standards required to host matches at the tournament. The Czech Football Association also withdrew its candidacy in March 2014 citing that the government was not ready to provide the guarantees for building a new stadium.

The Italian Football Federation withdrew Milan's San Siro Stadium after selecting Rome's Stadio Olimpico as the country's sole venue to host Euro 2020 matches.

Several federations withdrew their bids in late April 2014, before the final dossiers were submitted on 25 April. Four nations who had hosted recent tournaments – Euro 2008 hosts Switzerland (St. Jakob-Park, Basel), Euro 2012 co-hosts Poland (National Stadium, Warsaw and Silesian Stadium, Chorzów) and Ukraine (Olympic Stadium, Kyiv), and Euro 2016 hosts France (Stade des Lumières, Lyon) – withdrew after deciding that their chances of success were minimal. Despite being favourites to host the final, Turkey withdrew its bid to host the final at the Atatürk Olympic Stadium in Istanbul in favour of bidding to host UEFA Euro 2024.

In addition, other withdrawn bids included: both Portuguese bids, at the Estádio da Luz and Estádio do Dragão, due to lack of support from local councils; the bid from the Czech Football Association in Prague due to lack of financial guarantees from city authorities; the Croatian Football Federation's bid in Zagreb, due to financial problems; Armenia; Greece; Kazakhstan; and Serbia.

== Bidding venues ==
The final list of bids was published by UEFA on 26 April 2014 with a decision on the hosts to be made by the UEFA Executive Committee on 19 September 2014. There were two bids for the Finals Package (of which one was successful, marked with blue colour for Semi-Finals and Final) and 19 bids for the Standard Package (of which 12 were initially successful, marked with green colour for Quarter-Finals and Group Stage, yellow colour for Round of 16 and Group Stage; Brussels, marked with red, were initially selected but removed from the list of venues by UEFA on 7 December 2017).

Cities that bid to host matches at UEFA Euro 2020
Red: Bidding for standard package; Yellow: Bidding for both standard and final packages

Country	City	Venue	Capacity	Package
Azerbaijan	Baku	Baku National Stadium	68,700	Standard Package
Belarus	Minsk	Traktor Stadium	16,500 (to be expanded to 33,000)	Rejected Standard Package
Belgium	Brussels	Eurostadium (proposed new national stadium)	50,000 (60,000 potentially)	Standard Package (but later cancelled)
Bulgaria	Sofia	Vasil Levski National Stadium	43,000 (to be expanded to 50,000)	Rejected Standard Package
Denmark	Copenhagen	Telia Parken	38,065	Standard Package
England	London	Wembley Stadium	90,000	Finals Package (and withdrawn Standard Package)
Germany	Munich	Allianz Arena	67,812 (to be expanded to 75,000)	Standard Package (and withdrawn Finals Package)
Hungary	Budapest	Puskás Aréna	56,000 (proposed new 68,000 stadium)	Standard Package
Republic of Ireland	Dublin	Aviva Stadium	51,700	Standard Package
Israel	Jerusalem	Teddy Stadium	34,000 (to be expanded to 53,000)	Rejected Standard Package
Italy	Rome	Stadio Olimpico	72,698	Standard Package
Macedonia	Skopje	Philip II Arena	33,460	Rejected Standard Package
Netherlands	Amsterdam	Amsterdam Arena	53,052 (to be expanded to 55–56,000)	Standard Package
Romania	Bucharest	Arena Națională	55,600	Standard Package
Russia	Saint Petersburg	Krestovsky Stadium	69,500 (under construction)	Standard Package
Scotland	Glasgow	Hampden Park	52,063	Standard Package
Spain	Bilbao	San Mamés Stadium	53,332	Standard Package
Sweden	Solna, Stockholm	Friends Arena	50,000	Eliminated Standard Package
Wales	Cardiff	Millennium Stadium	74,500	Eliminated Standard Package

On 10 September 2014, UEFA published the evaluation reports of the 19 bids. Before the voting on 19 September 2014, UEFA judged that the candidatures of Belarus (Minsk), Bulgaria (Sofia), Macedonia (Skopje) and Israel (Jerusalem) did not fulfill the bid requirements, so they did not participate at all in the selection phases.

== Voting ==
=== Procedure ===
The voting procedure of the venues was approved by the UEFA Executive Committee on 13 May 2014:

- In the first voting phase, the winner of the Finals Package would be selected.
- In the second voting phase, the winners of the four Standard Packages which would host the quarter-finals would be selected.
- In the third and fourth voting phases, the winners of the eight Standard Packages which would host the round of 16 matches would be selected. This selection would be based on "regional zones" which would be finalized by the end of August 2014 by UEFA Executive Committee members whose associations were not bidding.
  - In the third phase, for each zone that had not been selected in the first two phases, a winner of the Standard Package would be selected.
  - In the fourth phase, the winners of the remaining Standard Packages would be selected.

The voting was done by secret ballot and executive committee members which were associated with the bidding associations were not allowed to vote.

The announcement ceremony of the selected venues took place at the Espace Hippomène in Geneva on 19 September 2014, 13:00 CEST, right after the voting in the morning.

=== Summary ===
Location of stadiums of the UEFA Euro 2020.
Blue: group stage, semi-finals and final.
Green: group stage and quarter-finals.
Yellow: group stage and round of 16.

The 13 venues were selected and announced on 19 September 2014:

- Final and Semi-finals: London (England)
- Quarter-finals and Group stage: Munich (Germany), Baku (Azerbaijan), Saint Petersburg (Russia), Rome (Italy)
- Round of 16 and Group Stage: Copenhagen (Denmark), Bucharest (Romania), Amsterdam (Netherlands), Dublin (Republic of Ireland), Bilbao (Spain), Budapest (Hungary), Brussels (Belgium), Glasgow (Scotland)

Since Minsk, Sofia, Skopje and Jerusalem did not fulfill UEFA's requirements, Cardiff and Stockholm were the only cities not selected among the eligible bids.

=== First phase ===
In the first phase, the venue which will host the semi-finals and final was selected. Munich withdrew prior to the vote, and London was selected by acclamation.

City	Votes
(England) London	
(Germany) Munich	w/d

=== Second phase ===
In the second phase, the four venues which will host one quarter-final and three group stage matches were selected. The seven candidate venues with a capacity of at least 60,000 were eligible. Each voting member ranked the venues in their order of preference: four points for their first choice, three points for their second choice, two points for their third choice, and one point for their fourth choice. The four venues with the highest points total were selected.

City	Points
(Germany) Munich	38
(Azerbaijan) Baku	37
(Russia) Saint Petersburg	29
(Italy) Rome	20
(Belgium) Brussels	11
(Wales) Cardiff	3
(Hungary) Budapest	2

=== Third phase ===
In the third phase, a venue from each of the geographical zones which had not yet been chosen was selected to host a round of 16 match and three group stage matches. The six geographical zones were:

- Zone 1 (North-West): England, Republic of Ireland, Scotland, Wales
- Zone 2 (Scandinavia): Denmark, Sweden
- Zone 3 (East): Azerbaijan, Belarus, Russia
- Zone 4 (Centre-East): Bulgaria, Macedonia, Hungary, Romania
- Zone 5 (Centre): Belgium, Germany, Netherlands
- Zone 6 (South-Mediterranean): Italy, Israel, Spain

Prior to the vote, the venues of Belarus (Minsk), Bulgaria (Sofia), Macedonia (Skopje), and Israel (Jerusalem) were determined to have failed bid requirements, and thus were not involved in the final two phases.

Of the six zones, Zones 1, 3, 5 and 6 already had venues chosen in the first two phases. Therefore, only Zones 2 and 4 were involved in this phase.

Zone 2
City	Votes
(Denmark) Copenhagen	13
(Sweden) Stockholm	3

Zone 4
City	Votes
(Romania) Bucharest	12
(Hungary) Budapest	3

=== Fourth phase ===
In the fourth phase, the six remaining venues which would host one round of 16 and three group stage matches were selected among the remaining candidate venues. Each voting member ranked the venues in their order of preference: six points for their first choice, five points for their second choice, four points for their third choice, three points for their fourth choice, two points for their fifth choice, and one point for their sixth choice. The six venues with the highest points total were selected.

City	Points
(Netherlands) Amsterdam	58
(Republic of Ireland) Dublin	55
(Spain) Bilbao	50
(Hungary) Budapest	48
(Belgium) Brussels	43
(Scotland) Glasgow	22
(Wales) Cardiff	21
(Sweden) Stockholm	18

== Selected venues ==
Below were the initial 13 venues selected by UEFA. However, the UEFA Executive Committee removed Brussels as a host city on 7 December 2017 due to delays with the building of the Eurostadium. The four matches (three group stage, one round of 16) initially scheduled to be held in Brussels were instead allocated to London. Therefore, London now hosted a total of seven matches, as the city was already chosen to host the semi-finals and final of the tournament. On 23 April 2021, UEFA announced that due to a lack of guarantees regarding spectators caused by the COVID-19 pandemic, Dublin was removed as a tournament host (with their matches reallocated to Saint Petersburg for the group stage and London for the round of 16). Similarly, UEFA reassigned the four matches in Spain elsewhere in the country, with La Cartuja in Seville replacing Bilbao.

Country	City	Venue	Capacity	Games	Previous hosts (notes)
Azerbaijan	Baku	Baku National Stadium	68,700 (new stadium)	QF and GS	—
Belgium	Brussels	Eurostadium	50,000 (60,000 potentially)	R16 and GS (later cancelled)	1972 & 2000
Denmark	Copenhagen	Telia Parken	38,065	R16 and GS	—
England	London	Wembley Stadium	90,000	F and SF (R16 and GS later added)	1996
Germany	Munich	Allianz Arena	67,812 (to be expanded to 75,000)	QF and GS	1988
Hungary	Budapest	Puskás Aréna	56,000 (proposed new 68,000 stadium)	R16 and GS	—
Republic of Ireland	Dublin	Aviva Stadium	51,700	R16 and GS (later cancelled)	—
Italy	Rome	Stadio Olimpico	72,698	QF and GS	1968 & 1980
Netherlands	Amsterdam	Johan Cruyff Arena	54,990	R16 and GS	2000
Romania	Bucharest	Arena Națională	55,600	R16 and GS	—
Russia	Saint Petersburg	New Zenit Stadium	69,500	QF and GS	—
Scotland	Glasgow	Hampden Park	52,063	R16 and GS	—
Spain	Bilbao	San Mamés Stadium	53,332	R16 and GS (later moved to La Cartuja, Seville)	1964
