= UEFA Euro 2032 =

19th edition of UEFA European Championship

Campionato europeo di calcio 2032 (in Italian) 2032 Avrupa Futbol Şampiyonası (in Turkish)

Tournament details
- Host countries: Italy; Turkey
- Dates: June – July
- Teams: 24
- Venues: 10 (in TBA host cities)

The 2032 UEFA European Football Championship, commonly referred to as UEFA Euro 2032 or simply Euro 2032, will be the 19th UEFA European Championship, the quadrennial international football championship organised by UEFA for the senior men's national teams of its member associations. Italy and Turkey will host the tournament, which is expected to take place between June and July 2032.

== Bid process ==
On 23 March 2022, UEFA announced that three bids, Italy, Turkey, and Russia, had announced their intentions to host the tournament. Turkey and Russia were also simultaneously bidding for Euro 2028. Russia already being suspended at that point due to the country's invasion of Ukraine, its bids for both tournaments were later deemed ineligible.

On 4 October 2023, Turkey withdrew from bidding for 2028, and joined Italy to form a unified bid for Euro 2032. Having been unopposed in their bid, the two nations were announced as hosts of Euro 2032 on 10 October 2023 in Nyon, Switzerland.

This will be the first time that European Championship matches are played in Turkey, while Italy will be hosting its fourth tournament, after Euro 1968, Euro 1980, and four matches of the pan-European Euro 2020. For the sixth time in nine editions since 2000, the hosting rights for a 16-team or 24-team tournament were awarded to multiple nations. (Note: Euro 1996, also with 16 teams, was hosted only by England, but was still planned to feature only 8 teams at the time of bidding and host appointment.) The Italian-Turkish bid was the first joint bid for a European Championship by countries not in close geographic proximity (the bids for Euro 2020 were made by each country individually).

== Qualification ==
Italy and Turkey qualified for the tournament automatically as co-hosts. The remaining spots will be determined by a qualifying tournament.

=== Qualified teams ===
Team	Qualified as	Qualified on	Previous appearances in tournament (Note: Bold indicates champion for that year. Italic indicates host for that year.) (Note: number assumes they fail to qualify for UEFA Euro 2028.)	Previous best performance
Italy	Co-host	10 October 2023	11 (**1968**, 1980, 1988, 1996, 2000, 2004, 2008, 2012, 2016, **2020**, 2024)	**Winners** (1968, 2020)
Turkey	Co-host	10 October 2023	6 (1996, 2000, 2008, 2016, 2020, 2024)	Semi-final (2008)

== Potential venues ==
On 12 April 2023, both Italian Football Federation (FIGC) and Turkish Football Federation (TFF) submitted their lists of 10 proposed venues, when they were separate bids. Since the bid became a joint one, each country will instead select five stadiums for the final tournament. The selection of the ten venues—five from each country—will be decided in November 2026.

Italy
Rome		Milan	Turin	Naples
Stadio Olimpico	New AS Roma Stadium	Generali Stadium	Juventus Stadium	Stadio Diego Armando Maradona
Capacity: **70,600** (to be renovated)	Capacity: **60,605** (new)	Capacity: **71,500** (new)	Capacity: **41,685**	Capacity: **54,726** (to be renovated)
Florence	Bologna	Genoa	Verona	Bari
Stadio Artemio Franchi	Stadio Renato Dall'Ara	Stadio Luigi Ferraris	Stadio Marcantonio Bentegodi	Stadio San Nicola
Capacity: **47,282** (under renovation)	Capacity: **36,000** (to be renovated)	Capacity: **33,205** (to be renovated)	Capacity: **39,211** (to be renovated)	Capacity: **58,270** (to be renovated)
Cagliari	Palermo	Salerno	Lecce	
New Cagliari Stadium	Stadio Renzo Barbera	Stadio Arechi	Stadio Via del mare	
Capacity: **30,000** (new (delayed))	Capacity: **36,365** (to be renovated)	Capacity: **31,300** (to be renovated)	Capacity: **32,000** (to be renovated)	
Location of the potential host cities of the UEFA Euro 2032.
Turkey
İstanbul			Ankara	Bursa
Atatürk Olympic Stadium	Ali Sami Yen Sports Complex	Şükrü Saracoğlu Stadium	New Ankara Stadium	Centennial Atatürk Stadium
Capacity: **77,563** (to be renovated)	Capacity: **53,387**	Capacity: **47,911** (to be renovated)	Capacity: **51,160** (new)	Capacity: **43,361**
Konya	Trabzon	Gaziantep	Antalya	Eskişehir
Konya Metropolitan Municipality Stadium	Şenol Güneş Sports Complex	Gaziantep Stadium	Antalya Stadium	Fethi Heper Stadium
Capacity: **41,600**	Capacity: **40,980**	Capacity: **35,574**	Capacity: **32,537**	Capacity: **32,500**

== Controversies ==
=== Concerns on Italian venues ===
Compared to the more modern Turkish stadiums, the Italian stadiums have been reported to be below UEFA's standards. There have been proposals to modernise a majority of the stadiums, but said projects have either been cancelled, or are not scheduled to be ready by 2032. In July 2025, it was reported that UEFA president Aleksander Čeferin had been repeatedly criticizing Italy's outdated infrastructure, calling their stadiums "a disgrace" and warned to authorities that "even small countries like Albania have made more progress" in constructing new and modern stadiums. In the same month, it was reported that UEFA had approved one out of the ten stadiums proposed by the Italian Football Federation (Juventus Stadium in Turin), and were given until March 2027 to begin any construction on any new or renovated stadiums, warning that failure to do so could put Italy's co-hosting in jeopardy. The warning about fixing Italy's stadiums was reiterated in April 2026.
