= UEFA Euro 2024 bids =

Bids to host UEFA Euro 2024

The bidding process of UEFA Euro 2024 ended on 27 September 2018 in Nyon, Switzerland, when Germany was announced to be the host. Two bids came before the deadline, 3 March 2017, which were Germany and Turkey as single bids.

== Hosting requirements ==
Press agencies revealed on 24 October 2013, that the European football governing body UEFA would have decided on the host of Euro 2024 in 2017. The bidding concept for UEFA Euro 2024 was ratified on 9 December 2016.

For the first time ever, bid requirements had to contain specific criteria relating to the respect of human rights, based on the United Nations "Guiding Principles on Business and Human Rights".

The tournament is expected to continue the format of the 2016 and 2020 editions, with a total of 51 matches taking place for a duration of up to 32 days, with 24 teams competing in the tournament.

The required capacities for the ten stadiums were as follows:

- 3 stadia with 50,000 seats (preferably one of which with at least 60,000 seats)
- 3 stadia with 40,000 seats
- 4 stadia with 30,000 seats

== Schedule ==
Date	Notes
9 December 2016	Applications formally invited
3 March 2017	Closing date for registering intention to bid
10 March 2017	Announcement of bidders
17 March 2017	Bid requirements made available to bidders
27–28 April 2017	Opening workshop for bidders
27 April 2018	Submission of bid dossier
21 September 2018	Publication of the evaluation report by UEFA and bid books by bidders
27 September 2018	Bid presentation and announcement of host

== Bids ==
UEFA announced that only two countries, Germany and Turkey, had announced their intentions to host the tournament.

On 21 September 2018, UEFA published its UEFA Euro 2024 bid evaluation report. The German Football Association and the Turkish Football Federation published also their respective bid book.

=== Germany ===
German stadia map

On 23 October 2013, the executive committee of the German Football Association (DFB), under president Wolfgang Niersbach, had voted to place a bid for hosting the tournament. This was announced publicly the following day on 24 October 2013 at the 41st DFB-Bundestag in Nuremberg. On 20 January 2017, the DFB executive committee under president Reinhard Grindel unanimously confirmed the bid for UEFA Euro 2024. On 1 March 2017, the DFB submitted an official declaration of interest to UEFA General Secretary Theodore Theodoridis.

Previously, UEFA Euro 1988 had been held in West Germany, as well as the 1974 FIFA World Cup and the 2006 FIFA World Cup. German media has also reported that the DFB was willing to let Wembley Stadium host the final for UEFA Euro 2020, in return for support from The Football Association for Germany's 2024 bid.

Until 17 February 2017, cities and stadiums interested in hosting the tournament were able to submit a non-committal statement of interest to the DFB. By the deadline, 18 cities and stadia had submitted the necessary documents, including the 12 hosts of the 2006 FIFA World Cup. The DDV-Stadion in Dresden was the first stadium turned down on 1 March 2017, as it failed to meet the mandatory capacity of 30,000 seats. The formal application procedure began on 11 April 2017, with a total of 17 potential venues requesting bidding documents. The city of Freiburg im Breisgau withdrew its bid on 25 April 2017, citing that the guidelines announced by the DFB would not result in a promising application for the stadium. On 26 April 2017, the city of Karlsruhe withdrew its application. A total of 15 cities expressed their interest in hosting by the 26 April 2017 deadline. The Fritz-Walter-Stadion in Kaiserslautern later withdrew its bid on 15 May 2017 due to "irresponsible financial risk", leaving 14 cities remaining.

According to UEFA requirements, stadiums had to at least have a capacity of 30,000 seats publicly available seats (not including media seating and places with a restricted view). The cities of Freiburg im Breisgau and Karlsruhe planned their bids with respective new stadia.

The full application documents for the cities had to be submitted to the DFB by 10 July 2017. This date was originally 12 June 2017, but it was postponed due to a delay in receiving documents from UEFA. All 14 remaining cities submitted their applications to the DFB by the deadline. The DFB's application committee evaluated the submitted documents in the following weeks. In addition, as of the end of July 2017, the DFB visited all 14 stadiums in order to take into account the conditions and examine the possible reconstruction and expansion plans.

The selection criteria used for the venues was primarily the stadium capacity. In order to allow as many spectators as possible for the European Championship, the DFB increased the net seating capacity required by UEFA for three stadiums from at least 50,000 to at least 60,000. Other criteria included security aspects and infrastructure. On the basis of these qualitative criteria and the application documents of the cities, a ranking of the applicant venues was established by the DFB's application committee. To ensure that the European Championships take place throughout Germany as a whole, a regional classification of the applicants was carried out in four zones spread across the country. From each of the four zones, one to four stadiums could be chosen. Zone I (north) included Bremen, Hamburg, and Hanover. Zone II (west) was assigned to Cologne, Dortmund, Düsseldorf, Gelsenkirchen, and Mönchengladbach. Zone III (south) included Frankfurt, Munich, Nuremberg, and Stuttgart. Zone IV (east) included Berlin and Leipzig.

The candidate cities had to make commitments to UEFA, for example, that within the "commercial zone" of 500 meters around the stadiums that political and religious demonstrations would be prevented. The cities also had to enact laws to protect UEFA's marketing rights. This included preventing pubs near the stadiums from broadcasting matches on large screens. Wolfgang Hoffmann-Riem, former Federal Constitutional Court judge, considered parts of the requirements unconstitutional. First, interventions in the freedom of assembly were not allowed for commercial interests. Also, only parliaments, not cities, had the power to legislate. Finally, the ban on large screens in nearby restaurants was an unlawful interference of occupational freedom. The leaders of the city of Bremen shared these concerns, while officials in Hamburg and Leipzig did not see any concerns. However, the DFB responded that the UEFA regulations were to ensure safety and security around the host stadiums, and that cities were not required to enact laws relating to UEFA marketing rights.

German bid logo

Taking into account all these criteria and conditions, the DFB executive committee selected the final 10 cities and stadia as candidate venues from the remaining 14 applicants on 15 September 2017. The executive committee unanimously followed the recommendation of the DFB bid committee, which had ranked the 14 applicants. Berlin, Cologne, Dortmund, Düsseldorf, Frankfurt, Gelsenkirchen, Hamburg, Leipzig, Munich, and Stuttgart were all selected, having been ranked from 1–10. The Max-Morlock-Stadion in Nuremberg, HDI-Arena in Hanover, Borussia-Park in Mönchengladbach, and Weser-Stadion in Bremen were all dropped from the final bid, having been ranked from 11 to 14. The zoning rule did not have to be applied, since according to the ranking no more than four and at least one venue per zone were ranked in the top ten.

The following were the host cities and stadia selected for Germany's bid:

- Berlin – Olympiastadion, capacity 74,461 (Note: Host venue for the 1974 FIFA World Cup.) (Note: Host venue for the 2006 FIFA World Cup.)
- Munich – Allianz Arena, capacity 70,076
- Dortmund – Westfalenstadion, capacity 65,849
- Gelsenkirchen – Arena AufSchalke, capacity 54,740
- Stuttgart – MHPArena, capacity 54,697 (Note: Host venue for UEFA Euro 1988.)
- Hamburg – Volksparkstadion, capacity 52,245
- Düsseldorf – Esprit Arena, capacity 51,031
- Cologne – Müngersdorfer Stadion, capacity 49,827
- Leipzig – Red Bull Arena, capacity 49,539
- Frankfurt – Waldstadion, capacity 48,387

Until the end of September, applications for team base camp locations were accepted by the DFB. Each of the 24 teams requires a base camp before and during the tournament for accommodation and training facilities. A team base camp consists of a hotel or accommodation facility with appropriate comfort, privacy, and safety standards as well as a nearby, first-class training facility. Good infrastructure is required around the base camp, including a nearby airport. A base camp is also needed for the UEFA referees for the tournament.

On 25 August 2017, the DFB announced that the logo of the German application would be determined by a design contest on the "jovoto" platform. There, creative members submitted potential designs. A total of 2,076 designs were submitted by 990 participants from 82 countries. The community on the platform then selected 20 potential logos in a voting phase, with the DFB choosing 5 additional logos. The 25 proposals were evaluated by a jury consisting of DFB executives and experts from the design and communications industry, as well as representatives from the sports world, with the top 5 submissions being announced on 15 September 2017. An online vote on "fussball.de" took place from 15 to 22 September 2017 between the five remaining logos to determine the winning design which would be used for the German bid. The winning logo was used on the "bid book" which the DFB submitted to UEFA, along with all communicative actions relating to the DFB bid. The winning logo was presented by the DFB on 7 October 2017, with 44% of the votes in favour of the draft by Serbian graphic designer Igor Petrović. The logo features two hearts and a "24" in the Germany national colours of black, red, and gold.

On 14 November 2017, the DFB announced the official motto of the German bid: "United by Football – Vereint im Herzen Europas" (United by Football – United in the Heart of Europe). In order to show their support for the Germany bid, the Germany national team players wore badges on their kits with the German bid logo during the international friendly match against France in Cologne on the same day. The slogan, along with the bid logo, was used in all communicative measures by the DFB in connection with the bid. The official bid website "united-by-football.de" was also unveiled on 14 November.

On 24 April 2018, the DFB officially submitted their bid book to UEFA.

=== Turkey ===
Turkish stadia map

In April 2014, the Turkish Football Federation (TFF) announced they would not bid for the semi-finals and final for UEFA Euro 2020, but rather plan a bid for hosting UEFA Euro 2024. On 15 February 2017, the TFF confirmed the Turkish bid. This was done after Turkey was denied the organisation while the country had confirmed their interest in hosting Euro 2020 with UEFA in the spring of 2012. Even the deadline for declarations of interest which was at midnight on 15 May 2012 was extended by UEFA to welcome other bids on 16 May. Including the UEFA Euro 2024 bid, this was the fifth consecutive unsuccessful bid for UEFA Euro organisations. Turkey had only previously hosted one major football tournament, the 2013 FIFA U-20 World Cup. However, the country previously attempted to host the European Championship in 2008 (in a joint bid with Greece), 2012, and 2016, but failed on all occasions. On 20 October 2017, the TFF announced the venues for the Turkish bid following a meeting of the bid committee.

Turkish bid logo

The following were the host cities and stadia selected for Turkey's bid:

- Ankara – New Ankara Stadium, capacity 65,307
- Antalya – New Antalya Stadium, capacity 43,616
- Bursa – Timsah Arena, capacity 43,331
- Eskişehir – New Eskişehir Stadium, capacity 34,930
- Gaziantep – New Gaziantep Stadium, capacity 35,219
- Istanbul – Atatürk Olympic Stadium, capacity 92,208
- Istanbul – Türk Telekom Stadium, capacity 53,611
- İzmit – İzmit Stadium, capacity 34,712
- Konya – Konya Büyükşehir Stadium, capacity 37,829
- Trabzon – Şenol Güneş Stadium, capacity 43,233

The bid logo and slogan were unveiled on 19 January 2018. The logo was inspired by the heart with football, and the star from the Turkish flag combined with the number "24" represented the year 2024 and the Turkish national flag colours. The logo was designed by Turkish graphic designer Erhan Yalur. Turkey announced the official slogan as Share Together (Turkish: Birlikte Paylaşalım) for the competition.

On 26 April 2018, the TFF officially submitted their bid book to UEFA.

== Voting results ==
The UEFA Executive Committee voted for the host in a secret ballot, with only a simple majority required to determine the host. In the event of a tie, Aleksander Čeferin, the UEFA president, would cast the decisive vote. Of the 20 members of the executive committee, Reinhard Grindel (Germany) and Servet Yardımcı (Turkey) were ineligible to vote, and Lars-Christer Olsson (Sweden) was absent through illness, leaving a total of 17 voting members. In the end, Germany won the right to host the tournament.

Voting results
Country	Votes
Germany	12
Turkey	4
Abstention	1
Total	17

== Decided not to bid ==
=== Denmark–Finland–Norway–Sweden ===
On 4 March 2016, the Danish Football Association announced preparation of a joint bid together with the FAs of fellow Nordic countries Sweden, Norway, and Finland for either UEFA Euro 2024 or 2028. Sweden had previously hosted UEFA Euro 1992 and the 1958 FIFA World Cup, and Denmark was one of the eleven hosts of the 2020 edition. Stockholm (1912) and Helsinki (1952) hosted Summer Olympic Games.

Unsuccessfully, the Nordic countries (Fennoscandia) joined forces to bid for UEFA Euro 2008, losing out to Austria–Switzerland. There were also just ten over 20,000+ seater stadiums which could host matches: Solna (final venue), Gothenburg, Stockholm, Malmö (Sweden), Copenhagen, Brøndby, Aarhus (Denmark), Oslo, Trondheim (Norway), and Helsinki (Finland). While not hosting any matches, related events would be held in Iceland and the Faroe Islands, too. However, the federations ditched plans to bid for the 2024 European Championship on 28 February 2017.

=== Estonia–Russia ===
In December 2012, it was reported that the Estonian Football Association were negotiating the possibility of a joint bid together with Russia; Russia also hosted the 2018 FIFA World Cup, while Moscow hosted the Summer Olympic Games in 1980, when Russia and Estonia were part of the Soviet Union. Estonia had also hosted the 2012 UEFA European Under-19 Championship and was originally scheduled to host the 2020 UEFA European Under-17 Championship before the COVID-19 outbreak which led to the cancellation of the tournament.

=== Netherlands ===
On 23 March 2012, Bert van Oostveen announced the Netherlands had plans to host Euro 2024. In 2000, the Netherlands and Belgium co-hosted the tournament. Cities would be Rotterdam (two stadiums), Amsterdam (two stadiums), Eindhoven, Heerenveen, Groningen, Enschede, Arnhem, and Utrecht (over 20,000 each with possibility to expand least to 30,000). Amsterdam previously hosted the Summer Olympic Games, in 1928.
