= UEFA Euro 2012 bids =

Host selection process for 2012 international football tournament

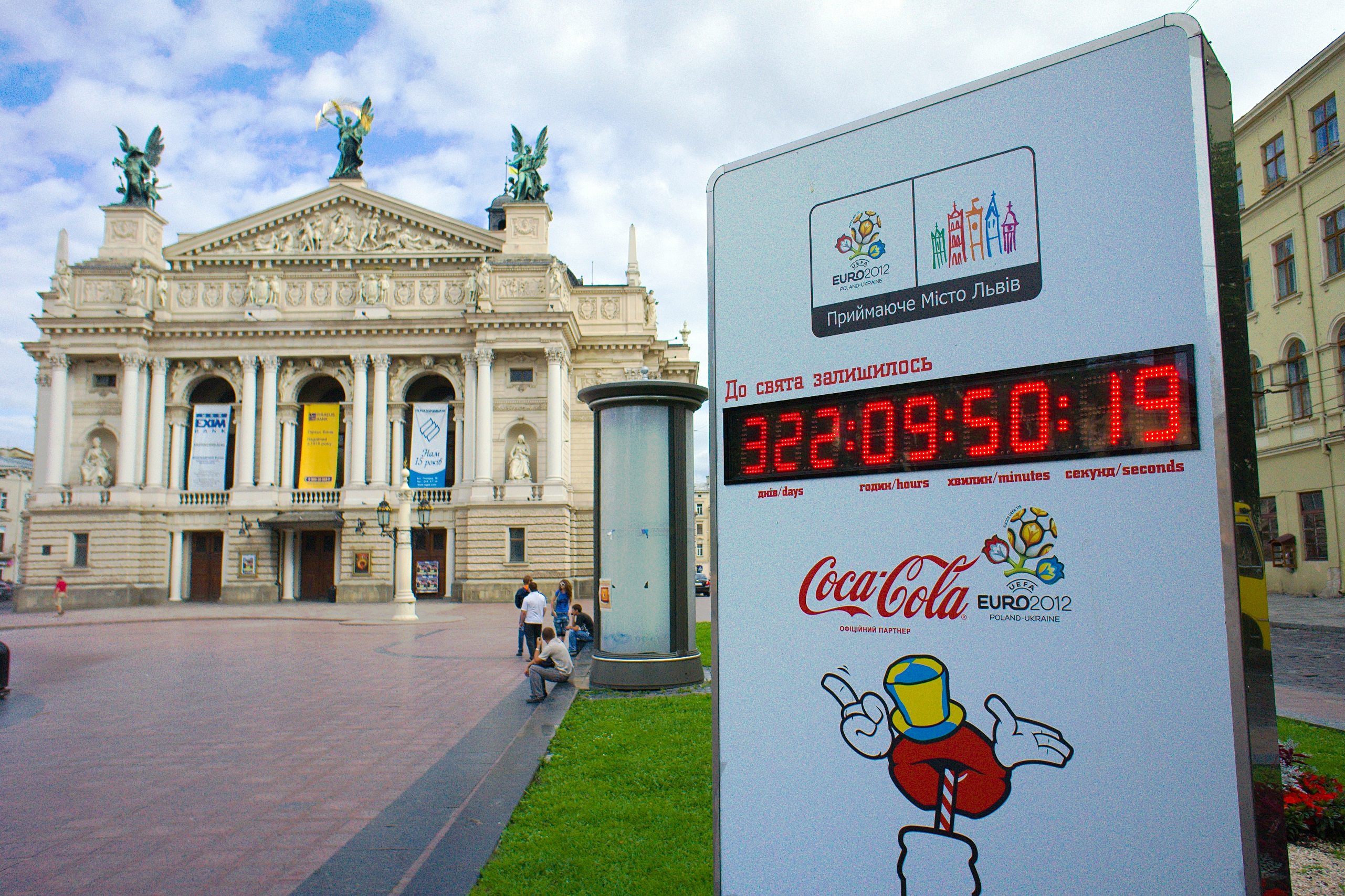
Lviv, Ukraine: counting down to start of UEFA Euro 2012

The bidding process for UEFA Euro 2012 ended on 18 April 2007, when a joint bid from Poland and Ukraine was selected as the host.

== Selection process ==
The organisation of the event was initially contested by five bids representing seven countries: Croatia–Hungary (joint bid), Greece, Italy, Poland–Ukraine (joint bid), and Turkey.

On 8 November 2005, UEFA's Executive Committee narrowed the candidates down to a short list of three:

- Italy (11 votes)
- Croatia–Hungary (9 votes)
- Poland–Ukraine (7 votes)
- Turkey (6 votes, eliminated)
- Greece (2 votes, eliminated)

On 31 May 2006, all three bids completed the second phase of the process. This was by submitting more detailed dossiers, before UEFA conducted site visits to candidate countries in September. The final decision was due to be announced on 8 December 2006 in Nyon, but this was postponed to "give bidding associations more time for the fine tuning of their bids".

The hosts were eventually chosen on 18 April 2007, in Cardiff, by a vote of the members of the UEFA Executive Committee. Owing to their affiliation with associations bidding to host the competition, two of its 14 members, namely Italy and Ukraine, were not permitted to vote. In the first of potentially two rounds of voting, each member had one vote (a total of 12 votes were therefore cast).

=== Final round ===
Voting results
Country	Votes
Poland – Ukraine	8
Italy	4
Croatia – Hungary	0

The Poland–Ukraine bid received an absolute majority of 8 votes, and was therefore announced the winner without requiring a second round. Italy received the remaining four votes, while the Croatia–Hungary bid failed to win any votes.

== Bids ==
=== Poland and Ukraine ===
These cities were the original candidates of the winning bid:

- Gdańsk (POL)
- Poznań (POL)
- Warsaw (POL)
- Wrocław (POL)
- Kyiv (UKR)
- Donetsk (UKR)
- Dnipropetrovsk (UKR)
- Lviv (UKR)

Two more Polish cities, Kraków and Chorzów, were listed as reserve venues in Poland, while in Ukraine Odesa was a reserve city and the Olympic Stadium in Donetsk a reserve stadium.

==== Further development ====
Afterwards, there were some changes regarding the venues. The final decision was taken on the UEFA meeting on 13 May 2009.: Kharkiv replaced Dnipropetrovsk, while the mentioned reserve venues were turned down. The result was this:

Warsaw	Gdańsk	Wrocław	Poznań
National Stadium; Capacity: 50,000	PGE Arena; Capacity: 40,000	Municipal Stadium; Capacity: 40,000	Municipal Stadium; Capacity: 40,000
3 matches in Group A opening match, quarter-final, semi-final	3 matches in Group C quarter-final	3 matches in Group A	3 matches in Group C
Kyiv	Donetsk	Kharkiv	Lviv
Olympic Stadium; Capacity: 60,000	Donbas Arena; Capacity: 50,000	Metalist Stadium; Capacity: 35,000	Arena Lviv; Capacity: 30,000
3 matches in Group D quarter-final, final	3 matches in Group D quarter-final, semi-final	3 matches in Group B	3 matches in Group B

Note: Capacity figures are those for matches at UEFA Euro 2012 and are not necessarily the total capacity that the stadium is capable of holding.

Former candidates

The following venues were also considered but fell out of the running as a result of the UEFA meeting on 13 May 2009.

Photo	City	Stadium	Capacity	Main tenants	Notes
	Chorzów	Silesian Stadium	55,211	Poland national team	not selected by UEFA, orig. reserve
	Kraków	Municipal Stadium	33,680	Wisła Kraków	not selected by UEFA, orig. reserve
	Odesa	Chornomorets Stadium	34,362	Chornomorets Odesa	not selected by UEFA, orig. reserve
	Donetsk	RSC Olimpiyskiy	25,678	None, owned and formerly used by Shakhtar Donetsk	not selected by UEFA, orig. reserve
	Dnipropetrovsk	Dnipro Arena	31,003	Dnipro Dnipropetrovsk	original plans stated it would host 3 group matches

=== Croatia and Hungary ===
Hungary was bidding for the third time consecutively after failing to win either the Euro 2004 or the Euro 2008 bid. It teamed up with Croatia after its previous partner, Austria, opted to unite with Switzerland to (successfully) bid to host Euro 2008. While Hungary had never hosted similar major tournaments, Croatia's capital Zagreb was a host city of the Euro 1976 as part of former Yugoslavia.

The following cities were proposed to host matches:

Croatian Football Federation

- Osijek
- Rijeka
- Split
- Zagreb

Hungarian Football Federation

- Budapest
- Debrecen
- Győr
- Székesfehérvár

=== Italy ===
Italy was the most experienced of all the bidding nations, having already twice hosted the European Championship (in 1968 and 1980), and the FIFA World Cup (in 1934 and 1990).

The following venues were proposed by the Italian Football Federation to host matches:

- Bari, San Nicola Stadium
- Florence, Artemio Franchi Stadium
- Milan, San Siro (probable semi final venue)
- Naples, a new stadium (probable semi final venue)
- Palermo, a new stadium to be built on the old velodrome site
- Rome, Stadio Olimpico (probable final venue)
- Turin, the new Juventus home stadium
- Udine, Friuli Stadium

== Aftermath ==
=== Losing countries ===
After not being chosen as hosts for this championship, Italy and Turkey delivered UEFA Euro 2016 bids.

=== Poland–Ukraine: Criticism of preparations ===
In January 2008, UEFA President Michel Platini warned the organisers of the need to avoid "critical slippages" in their preparations, prompting Scotland to volunteer as an alternative host twice. By June 2008, however, UEFA stated they were "not discussing any plan B in terms of new countries" hosting.

Ukraine reported several problems which threatened their ability to co host, including delays in the renovation of Kyiv’s Olympic Stadium, and difficulties funding infrastructure work due to the 2008 financial crisis. After an inspection in April 2009, Platini re-affirmed that Ukraine would remain co-host, hinting that most matches could go to Poland. Polish Prime Minister Donald Tusk stated that his country would be capable of the task, but was committed to the original plans, as was the Polish Football Association (PZPN).

In September 2009, Platini announced that "Ukraine has made sudden progress in their efforts to stage the tournament," and it was soon confirmed that their four cities (Donetsk, Kharkiv, Kyiv, and Lviv) would host matches. Kyiv was also confirmed to host the final match.

An interview Platini gave to the German Football Association (DFB) in May 2010 suggested that Germany and Hungary could replace Ukraine unless improvements were made, casting new doubt on the nation's readiness. By August, however, Platini revisited that and stated, "You can consider that the ultimatum no longer exists," and that he was optimistic about preparations in both countries and saw no major obstacles. After a UEFA delegation visited Ukraine in September 2011, he stated the country was "virtually ready for Euro 2012."

In April 2012, while on an inspection trip to the host city of Lviv, Platini labelled hoteliers as "bandits and crooks" for raising hotel prices in Ukraine for Euro 2012. President Viktor Yanukovych ordered his government to prevent hoteliers from charging inflated prices. Some hoteliers had increased prices eighty-fold, causing Prime Minister Mykola Azarov to warn that state control of hotel tariffs might be introduced. Later that month, Markian Lubkivsky, head of the Euro 2012 organizing committee in Ukraine, said hotel and hostel prices were no longer "critically" inflated.
