= Vladimir Vardzelashvili =

Vladimir Vardzelashvili ვლადიმერ [ლადო] ვარძელაშვილი

Minister of Sport and Youth Affairs of Georgia
- In office 2010–2012
- President: Mikheil Saakashvili
- Preceded by: office established
- Succeeded by: Levan Kipiani

Personal details
- Born: August 3, 1979 (age 46) Khoni, Georgia

Vladimir "Lado" Vardzelashvili (Georgian: ვლადიმერ [ლადო] ვარძელაშვილი) (born August 3, 1979) is a Georgian politician who served as the Minister of Sport and Youth Affairs of Georgia from 2010 to 2012.

== Early years ==
Vardzelashvili was born in Khoni, Georgia on August 3, 1979. He studied at a Medical College from 1994 until 1997, and then in 2002, he graduated from the University of Economics and received his Master's degree in 2005. From 2002 until 2006, Vardzelashvili went to the University of Agriculture of Georgia and in 2006-2007, he studied at the School of Political Studies. He then worked for a media company and Tbilisi Municipality Sport Civil Service. From 2003 through 2004, he headed the Georgian Youth State Department.

== Political career ==
In 2004, Vardzelashvili was appointed Deputy Minister of Culture, Monuments Protection and Sport of Georgia. The same year, he became the leader of National Movement Organization. In 2008-2010, he was appointed Attorney General of Gori, Kaspi and Khashuri municipalities. From 2010 to 2012, he was the head of the newly established Ministry of Sports and Youth Affairs.

Vardzelashvili is an Honorary Doctor of Gori University Academic Council. He is married to Irina Onashvili, the winner of the 2003 Miss Georgia beauty pageant.

== See also ==
- List of Georgians
- Cabinet of Georgia
