= UEFA Euro 2016 bids =

The national federations that bid to host Euro 2016. France Italy Turkey

The bidding process of UEFA Euro 2016 ended on 28 May 2010 when France was announced to be the host. Four bids came before the deadline, 9 March 2009, which were France, Italy and Turkey as single bids and Norway and Sweden as a joint bid. Norway and Sweden eventually withdrew their bid in December 2009.

== Hosting requirements ==
Joint bids of two member associations were permitted, and under exceptional circumstances, joint bids of three member associations also could be considered. The bidding process officially started on 11 December 2008.

UEFA examined the bid regulations on 11 December 2008. For the 2016 edition, nine stadia were required, with another three as optional contingency.

The temporary suggestion of minimum stadia-requirements was:

- 2 stadia with 50,000 seats
- 3 stadia with 40,000 seats
- 4 stadia with 30,000 seats

These requirements were confirmed by UEFA in a letter to the applicants sent on 1 July 2009. The stadia had to be ready by 30 June 2014.

There were also 19 other sectors with requirements, and over 200 questions for documentation of the appliers statements.

== Schedule ==
Date	Notes
15 December 2008	Applications formally invited
9 March 2009	Closing date for registering intention to bid
3 April 2009	Announcement of bidders
15 February 2010	Submission of detailed bids
7–15 April 2010	Bid visits
28 May 2010	Bid presentation and announcement of hosts

== Bids ==
Three European national associations signalled to UEFA their interest in staging UEFA Euro 2016:

=== France ===
Stadia Map – France

Bid logo

The President of the French Football Federation (FFF), Jean-Pierre Escalettes, declared France's intention to bid on 18 April 2007. Frédéric Thiriez commented that they would be a favourable candidate, owing to the quality of the infrastructure already in place. On 11 December 2007 the French sports minister, Bernard Laporte, said the bid would have the full support of the government and it would be submitted at the end of 2008 or early 2009.

The FFF officially confirmed the French bid on 13 February 2009.

List of host cities/stadia proposed for 2016 bid (Three will later be nominated as back-ups):

- Stadia planned for renovating:
  - Saint-Denis: Stade de France, current capacity 81,338 (UEFA Elite Stadium)
  - Marseille: Stade Vélodrome, current capacity 60,013 (Increase of the capacity to 70,000)
  - Lens: Stade Félix-Bollaert, current capacity 41,809 (Increase of the capacity to 50,000)
  - Paris: Parc des Princes, current capacity 48,713
  - Saint-Étienne: Stade Geoffroy-Guichard, current capacity 35,616 (Increase of the capacity to 42,000)
  - Toulouse: Stadium Municipal, current capacity 35,472 (Increase of the capacity to 40,000)
  - Strasbourg: Stade de la Meinau, current capacity 29,320 (Increase of the capacity to 36,000)
  - Nancy: Stade Marcel Picot, current capacity 20,087 (Increase of the capacity to 35,000)
- New Stadiums:
  - Lyon: OL Land, capacity 62,500
  - Villeneuve d'Ascq (Lille): Grand Stade Lille Métropole, capacity 50,000
  - Bordeaux: New stadium to replace Stade Chaban-Delmas, capacity 42,000
  - Nice: New stadium to replace Stade du Ray, capacity 35,000

Website for the bid:

=== Italy ===
Stadia Map – Italy

After months of speculation in the Italian media, the Italian Football Federation (FIGC) decided to launch an official bid on 2 March 2009, with the FIGC President Giancarlo Abete saying that his country "cannot pull out of hosting major international events" following a Federal Council meeting in Rome.

An Italian bid to stage the preceding tournament in 2012 was surprisingly beaten by a joint proposal from Poland and Ukraine in the final vote in April 2007. On 11 September 2009, during a UEFA workshop presentation on the subject of stadia and security, the Project Manager of the Italy Candidate for UEFA Euro 2016, Michele Uva, said: "Euro 2016 is a major goal for Italy, to this Federation and to the entire Italian sporting movement. Italy is preparing to draw up an application that can display and enhance the country's system. This process will involve all the excellence in Italy. We know we have the backing of all the political forces, the 42 million Italians who love football, the public authorities, football clubs and the business world."

UEFA said they would require a minimum of nine stadia for the expanded 24-team and 51-match tournament in 2016 and the Italian bid confirmed on 20 September 2009 that it will propose in its bid dossier all twelve host cities it included in the 2012 bid.

"Euro 2016 represents an historic opportunity to transform the quality, security and ambience of Italian stadia," Abete said in a statement after the Italian bid unveiled its official logo for the candidacy on the same national team into a ball with the geographic shape of Italy stamped in the centre.

List of host cities/stadia proposed for 2016 bid (Three were to be later be nominated as back-ups):

- Bari – Stadio San Nicola: Current capacity 58,248. (Planned for renovations)
- Cagliari – Stadio Sant'Elia: Current capacity 23,486. (New stadium has been proposed by Cagliari Calcio)
- Cesena – Stadio Dino Manuzzi: Current capacity 23,860. (Planned for renovations)
- Florence – Stadio Artemio Franchi: Current capacity 47,282. (New stadium has been proposed by ACF Fiorentina)
- Milan – Stadio Giuseppe Meazza: Current capacity 80,074.
- Naples – Stadio San Paolo: Current capacity 60,240. (Planned for renovations)
- Palermo – Stadio Renzo Barbera: Current capacity 37,619. (New stadium has been proposed by U.S. Città di Palermo)
- Parma – Stadio Ennio Tardini: Current capacity 28,700. (Planned for renovations)
- Rome – Stadio Olimpico: Current capacity 72,700.
- Turin – Juventus Arena: Planned capacity of 41,000. (Under construction)
- Udine – Stadio Friuli: Current capacity 41,652. (Planned for renovations)
- Verona – Stadio Marc'Antonio Bentegodi: Current capacity 39,211. (Planned for renovations)

=== Turkey ===
Following its unsuccessful bids for Euro 2008 (a joint bid with Greece) and 2012, Turkey's renewed intentions for hosting Euro 2016 were first declared by late Turkish Football Federation (TFF) president Hasan Doğan after Euro 2008. He also mentioned that there were "positive talks" between him and Michel Platini about this issue.

On 7 February 2009, the TFF gave UEFA their official candidature brief to host UEFA Euro 2016. Amongst the bidders, Turkey remained the only country that had not hosted any European Championship or the World Cup.

On 23 December 2009, Turkish Minister of Sport Faruk Nafız Özak announced Turkey's official candidature logo and the eight host cities (Ankara, Antalya, Bursa, Eskişehir, Istanbul, İzmir, Kayseri and Konya) and three backup cities (Adana, Şanlıurfa and Trabzon) for the country's bid. Turkey plan to host the tournament with nine stadia in eight cities with Istanbul hosting two stadia.

Turkey says it won't host any other games if they don't get the 2016 Euro.

==== Stadia ====
Stadia Map – Turkey

Turkey's proposed cities and stadia for Euro 2016 were as follows:

- Main Stadia:
  - Ankara – New Ankara Stadium, to be constructed, capacity 43,303
  - Antalya – New Antalya Stadium, to be constructed, capacity 44,331
  - Bursa – New Bursa Stadium, to be constructed, capacity 33,000
  - Eskişehir – New Eskişehir Stadium, to be constructed, capacity 37,072
  - Istanbul
    - Atatürk Olympic Stadium (speculated for Final Venue), will go under renovation for being fully covered, capacity 76,092 (UEFA Elite Stadium). (Increase of the capacity to net 81,106 and gros 94,555)
    - Türk Telekom Arena, capacity 52,647.
  - İzmir – New İzmir Stadium, to be constructed, capacity speculated around 41,540
  - Kayseri – Kadir Has Stadium, ready, capacity 33,296
  - Konya – New Konya Stadium, to be constructed, capacity 37,000
- Backup Stadia:
  - Adana – New Adana Stadium, to be constructed, capacity undeclared 30.000
  - Trabzon – New Trabzon Stadium, to be constructed, capacity undeclared, speculated around 40,000
  - Şanlıurfa – Şanlıurfa GAP Stadium, ready, capacity 30,000

Turkey's bid planned for seven new stadia, while five existing stadia would be improved. The TFF expected costs of 1.65 billion euros for new investments and improvements for the stadia, infrastructure (transportation and accommodation) and tourism.

The exact details about the stadia bids and projects were revealed to the general public on 15 February 2010 when the ban over the country promotions were lifted by UEFA.

== Voting results ==
Country	Results	
Country	Round 1	Round 2
France	43	7
Turkey	38	6
Italy	23	Eliminated
Total votes	104	13

== Decided not to bid ==
=== Norway–Sweden ===
Norway and Sweden had announced their intention to co-host the championship. The bid was confirmed by the Football Association of Norway and the Swedish Football Association at a press conference in Oslo on 26 February 2009. However, it was eventually withdrawn in December 2009, due to lack of political support in both countries. Sweden, the 1992 hosts, and Norway had previously been part of an unprecedented "Nordic bid" for Euro 2008. This was along with Finland and Denmark.

=== Scotland–Wales ===
In December 2006, the Football Association of Wales announced it was tentatively considering the possibility of jointly hosting the tournament, with the Scottish Football Association. Scotland, along with the Republic of Ireland, bid for Euro 2008 and there was much discussion over whether the nation should consider a solo bid for Euro 2016. The entrance into government of the Scottish National Party (SNP) boosted the hopes of such an outcome.

Comments by Scottish First Minister Alex Salmond suggested that a Scotland–Wales bid may be considered, but a solo Scotland bid would be preferential if logistically possible. In June 2008, both Salmond and Welsh First Minister Rhodri Morgan became supportive of a joint Scotland–Wales bid, particularly when the increase in size of the tournament was announced. The two countries announced on 1 March 2009, however, that they had cancelled their plans owing to the economic downturn.

=== Republic of Ireland ===
In December 2002, after a failed bid with Scotland for Euro 2008, the Football Association of Ireland were unable to bid. This was because they did not have sufficient stadia to mount a solo bid, and no joint bid partner was forthcoming.

=== Russia ===
Speculation surrounded a potential Russian bid to host Euro 2016; the president of the Russian Football Union, Vitaliy Mutko, had said that "Russia has a good chance to become host of this championship". However, Russia did not bid before the deadline, instead deciding to focus on their bid for the 2018 FIFA World Cup, which they later won.

== Decision controversy ==
There was controversy concerning the decision to give the Euro 2016 to France and not to Turkey. After the decision was announced, responding to the question "During Sepp Blatter's term, Euro 2008 was awarded to Switzerland, during your term Euro 2016 is awarded to France, is this the new trend?" Platini said "When there is a Turkish president, then you can host a major tournament".

Guus Hiddink was also highly critical of the decision, stating: "This proves once again that in top-flight football the game is run by politics", and "UEFA gave the Euro 2016 finals to France, who have already had the tournament twice and they also had the World Cup finals in 1998. This does not feel right. I get the feeling that the actual bid was about other things. Otherwise the choice for France as hosting nation, the country of UEFA president Michel Platini, cannot be explained".

Another highly controversial remark came from the French national player Marc Planus: "We learned that last night (Thursday night). We're really excited, it will boost the French football". The bidding and the decision process took place on Friday, one day after the French player suggested that "they have already known".

Before the bidding process, Michel Platini introduced the French president Nicolas Sarkozy to every member of the decision committee in person, while he did not do the same for the Turkish president Abdullah Gül. After the decision Platini concluded:

"I think the fact that the president of the Republic was here was important. I think it was good he decided to come. If he hadn't come, Turkey would almost certainly have won".

"I'm happy because France has won, and I'm French — let's not forget it".
