= UEFA Euro 2028 =

18th edition of UEFA European Championship

Tournament details
- Host countries: England; Republic of Ireland; Scotland; Wales
- Dates: 9 June – 9 July
- Teams: 24
- Venues: 9 (in 8 host cities)

The 2028 UEFA European Football Championship, commonly referred to as UEFA Euro 2028 or simply Euro 2028, will be the 18th UEFA European Championship, the quadrennial international football championship for European teams. It will be co-hosted by England, Scotland, Wales, and the Republic of Ireland, and will take place from 9 June to 9 July 2028.

Spain are the defending champions after winning the 2024 final against England, one of the upcoming hosts.

== Bid process ==
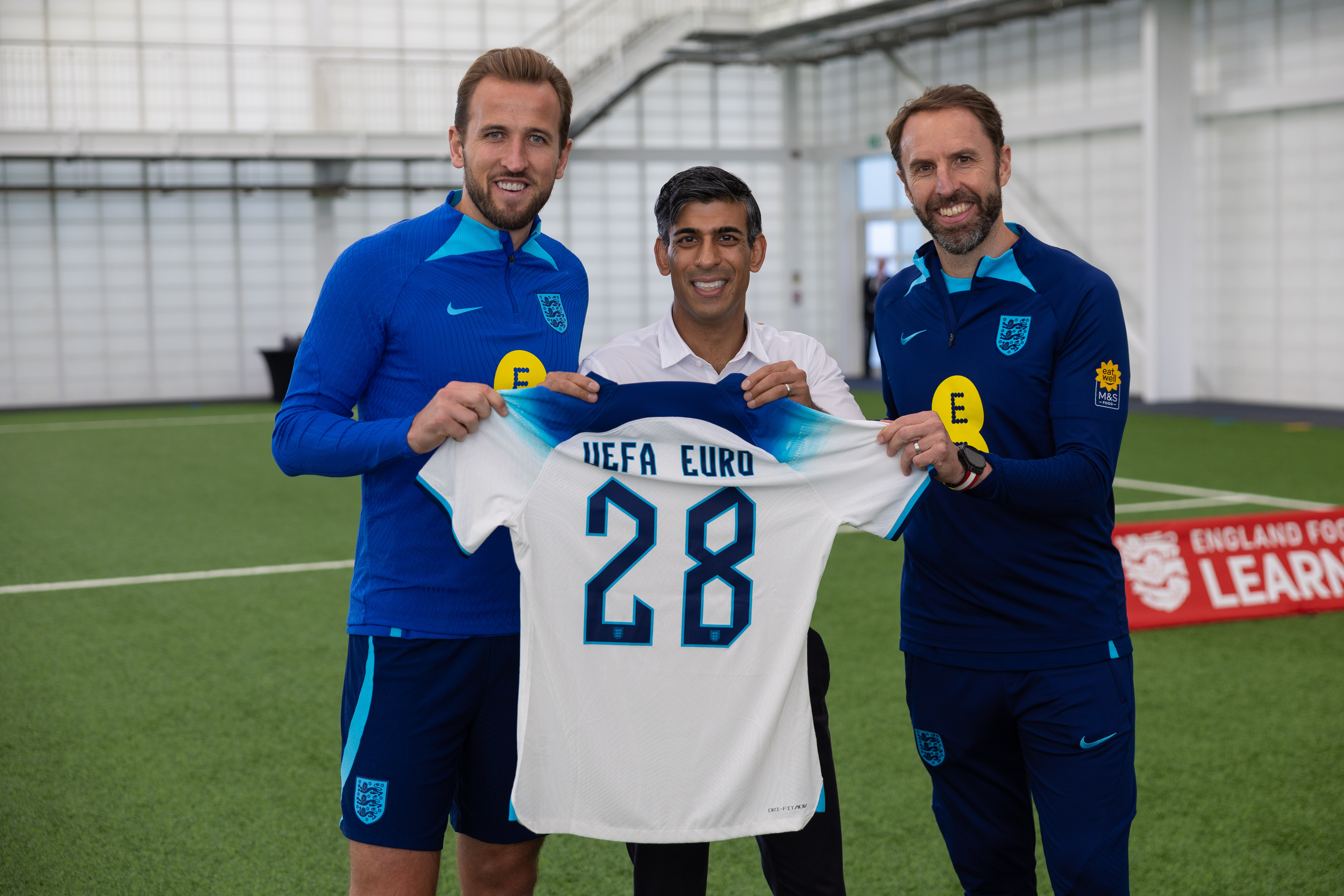
The then-UK Prime Minister Rishi Sunak (centre), with England captain Harry Kane (left) and then-England manager Gareth Southgate (right), at St George's Park in October 2023.

On 23 March 2022, UEFA announced that they had received three proposals from countries declaring an interest in hosting the tournament: one from Russia, one from Turkey and a joint bid by all five UEFA members from the UK and Ireland, including Northern Ireland. Russia and Turkey were simultaneously bidding to host Euro 2032.

Russia submitted its bids despite the ongoing ban by UEFA on Russian clubs and national teams due to the country's invasion of Ukraine, and in May 2022 its bids for both 2028 and 2032 were declared ineligible. In early October 2023, Turkey withdrew its submission to focus on bidding for Euro 2032 together with Italy.

The joint bid thus remained unopposed, and was selected unanimously on 10 October 2023 in Nyon, Switzerland, meaning that the tournament would be organised by the Republic of Ireland and the four Home Nations of football, England, Northern Ireland, Scotland and Wales. By late 2024, the proposed Northern Irish venue of Casement Park in Belfast was dropped, and it was confirmed that Northern Ireland would not host any games as originally planned, nor would it be eligible for automatic qualification.

Euro 2028 will be the fifth European Championship since 2000 to take place in multiple nations, and the second to take place in more than two countries. England will be hosting the tournament for the third time, having previously hosted Euro 1996 and eight matches (including the final) of the pan-European Euro 2020. Scotland will be doing so for the second time, after hosting four matches of Euro 2020. For the first time, matches of the competition will be played in the Republic of Ireland and Wales. The Republic of Ireland was initially selected to host matches in Euro 2020, but due to COVID-19 restrictions it was removed as a host, as the country was unable to confirm spectators could attend.

== Qualification ==
UEFA bid regulations state that only up to two host associations can qualify automatically. Therefore, UEFA decided that all four host teams (England, Republic of Ireland, Scotland, and Wales) will enter qualifying, with two automatic spots held in reserve for hosts which fail to qualify via the group stage. Should more than two host teams fail to qualify, the spots will be decided based on qualifying ranking.

A revised qualification format was confirmed by the UEFA Executive Committee in January 2023, modified from the previous cycle, with the exact format confirmed in May 2025. The qualifying group stage will feature twelve groups of four or five teams. The winner of each group will qualify for the European Championship, along with the eight best-ranked runners-up. The four remaining runners-up, along with teams from the Nations League, will advance to the play-offs. The exact play-off format is dependent on how many of the host slots are used. The qualifying group stage draw will take place on 6 December 2026 in Belfast, Northern Ireland.

== Venues ==
Location of the host cities of the UEFA Euro 2028.

On 12 April 2023, ten host stadiums for the Euro 2028 bid were revealed, with the list being confirmed by UEFA on 10 October 2023. Notable omissions include Anfield in Liverpool, which was ineligible to host games due to its pitch dimensions falling 4 metres short of UEFA's requirements, and Old Trafford in Manchester, which was ruled out after Manchester United were unable to guarantee whether the stadium would be ready at that time. Arsenal opted to forgo hosting matches at the Emirates Stadium in order to prioritise commercial activities and a potential stadium expansion. Stadium of Light in Sunderland, London Stadium in London, Celtic Park and Ibrox Stadium in Glasgow, Murrayfield Stadium in Edinburgh and Croke Park in Dublin were also shortlisted, but were not chosen. In Birmingham, Villa Park’s capacity is planned to be raised to over 50,000 in time for the tournament with a redevelopment of its North Stand.

Casement Park in Belfast was also included in the bid instead of Northern Ireland's national football stadium, Windsor Park, as the latter does not have a capacity large enough to comply with UEFA rules for hosting European Championship matches. With the redevelopment of Casement Park being delayed and budget increased, it was dropped as a host venue; thus the tournament will have nine stadiums and four host nations, excluding Northern Ireland.

List of host cities and stadiums
| Country | City | Stadium | Capacity | Image |
|---|---|---|---|---|
| England | London | Wembley Stadium | 86,000 | |
| England | London | Tottenham Hotspur Stadium | 62,850 | |
| England | Manchester | Etihad Stadium (Manchester City Stadium) | 61,038 | |
| England | Liverpool | Hill Dickinson Stadium (Everton Stadium) | 52,769 | |
| England | Newcastle | St James' Park | 52,719 | |
| England | Birmingham | Villa Park | 50,000 (after renovation) | |
| Scotland | Glasgow | Hampden Park | 51,866 | |
| Wales | Cardiff | Principality Stadium (National Stadium of Wales) | 73,931 | |
| Republic of Ireland | Dublin | Aviva Stadium (Dublin Arena) | 51,711 | |

== Match schedule ==
UEFA announced the tournament schedule on 12 November 2025, which did not include kick-off times. All matches will kick off at 14:00, 17:00 and 20:00 local time, with the exact times to be confirmed following the final draw.

The opening match of the tournament will be played at Millennium Stadium in Cardiff on 9 June 2028, to involve hosts Wales should they qualify. Stadiums will host matches in at least two groups in order to "provide local fans with a variety of teams playing in their host city". The round of 16 will be played in all host venues apart from Wembley, while each host country will stage a quarter-final fixture. To ensure sporting fairness and equal treatment, the winners of the round of 16 will play their quarter-final fixtures in a different venue. The semi-finals (4 and 5 July) and final (9 July) will be played at Wembley Stadium in London.

In each of the groups, position 1 in the schedule is reserved for the "group head", who are scheduled to play their group matches at one or more pre-selected venues. The four host nations and Northern Ireland have a group head position reserved should they be qualified by the time of the final draw. The remaining group head position(s) will be randomly assigned to Pot 1 team(s) in the final draw. The group head positions were allocated as follows:

- Wales: Group A (all 3 matches at Millennium Stadium, Cardiff)
- England: Group B (first match at City of Manchester Stadium, Manchester; last two matches at Wembley Stadium, London)
- Northern Ireland: Group D (first match at Tottenham Hotspur Stadium, London; second match at Wembley Stadium, London; third match at Villa Park, Birmingham)
- Republic of Ireland: Group E (all 3 matches at Aviva Stadium, Dublin)
- Scotland: Group F (all 3 matches at Hampden Park, Glasgow)

Apart from Group B, should a group head finish first, they will play in the round of 16 at the same venue as their third group stage fixture. Should the Group B head (reserved for England) win the group, they will play their round of 16 match at St James' Park in Newcastle, with any subsequent matches returning to Wembley. Should the heads of Groups A, E or F (reserved for Wales, Republic of Ireland and Scotland, respectively) finish as runners-up of their group, their potential quarter-final fixture would be played at the same venue as their group fixtures.

== Group stage ==
Group winners, runners-up and the best four third-placed teams will advance to the round of 16.

=== Group A ===
| Pos | Team | Pld | W | D | L | GF | GA | GD | Pts | Qualification |
|---|---|---|---|---|---|---|---|---|---|---|
| 1 | A1 (Wales, if qualified) | 0 | 0 | 0 | 0 | 0 | 0 | 0 | 0 | Advance to knockout stage |
| 2 | A2 | 0 | 0 | 0 | 0 | 0 | 0 | 0 | 0 | Advance to knockout stage |
| 3 | A3 | 0 | 0 | 0 | 0 | 0 | 0 | 0 | 0 | Possible knockout stage based on ranking |
| 4 | A4 | 0 | 0 | 0 | 0 | 0 | 0 | 0 | 0 | |

First match(es) will be played: 9 June 2028. Source: UEFA
9 June 2028

| Wales (if qualified) | Match 1 | A2 |

Millennium Stadium, Cardiff
10 June 2028

| A3 | Match 2 | A4 |

Hampden Park, Glasgow

14 June 2028

| Wales (if qualified) | Match 13 | A3 |

Millennium Stadium, Cardiff
14 June 2028

| A2 | Match 14 | A4 |

Hill Dickinson Stadium, Liverpool

18 June 2028

| A4 | Match 25 | Wales (if qualified) |

Millennium Stadium, Cardiff
18 June 2028

| A2 | Match 26 | A3 |

Tottenham Hotspur Stadium, London

=== Group B ===
| Pos | Team | Pld | W | D | L | GF | GA | GD | Pts | Qualification |
|---|---|---|---|---|---|---|---|---|---|---|
| 1 | B1 (England, if qualified) | 0 | 0 | 0 | 0 | 0 | 0 | 0 | 0 | Advance to knockout stage |
| 2 | B2 | 0 | 0 | 0 | 0 | 0 | 0 | 0 | 0 | Advance to knockout stage |
| 3 | B3 | 0 | 0 | 0 | 0 | 0 | 0 | 0 | 0 | Possible knockout stage based on ranking |
| 4 | B4 | 0 | 0 | 0 | 0 | 0 | 0 | 0 | 0 | |

First match(es) will be played: 10 June 2028. Source: UEFA
10 June 2028

| England (if qualified) | Match 3 | B2 |

City of Manchester Stadium, Manchester
10 June 2028

| B3 | Match 4 | B4 |

Aviva Stadium, Dublin

14 June 2028

| England (if qualified) | Match 15 | B3 |

Wembley Stadium, London
15 June 2028

| B2 | Match 16 | B4 |

Villa Park, Birmingham

19 June 2028

| B4 | Match 27 | England (if qualified) |

Wembley Stadium, London
19 June 2028

| B2 | Match 28 | B3 |

Aviva Stadium, Dublin

=== Group C ===
| Pos | Team | Pld | W | D | L | GF | GA | GD | Pts | Qualification |
|---|---|---|---|---|---|---|---|---|---|---|
| 1 | C1 | 0 | 0 | 0 | 0 | 0 | 0 | 0 | 0 | Advance to knockout stage |
| 2 | C2 | 0 | 0 | 0 | 0 | 0 | 0 | 0 | 0 | Advance to knockout stage |
| 3 | C3 | 0 | 0 | 0 | 0 | 0 | 0 | 0 | 0 | Possible knockout stage based on ranking |
| 4 | C4 | 0 | 0 | 0 | 0 | 0 | 0 | 0 | 0 | |

First match(es) will be played: 11 June 2028. Source: UEFA
11 June 2028

| C1 | Match 5 | C2 |

Wembley Stadium, London
11 June 2028

| C3 | Match 6 | C4 |

Villa Park, Birmingham

15 June 2028

| C1 | Match 17 | C3 |

Tottenham Hotspur Stadium, London
15 June 2028

| C2 | Match 18 | C4 |

St James' Park, Newcastle upon Tyne

20 June 2028

| C4 | Match 29 | C1 |

City of Manchester Stadium, Manchester
20 June 2028

| C2 | Match 30 | C3 |

Hill Dickinson Stadium, Liverpool

=== Group D ===
| Pos | Team | Pld | W | D | L | GF | GA | GD | Pts | Qualification |
|---|---|---|---|---|---|---|---|---|---|---|
| 1 | D1 (Northern Ireland, if qualified) | 0 | 0 | 0 | 0 | 0 | 0 | 0 | 0 | Advance to knockout stage |
| 2 | D2 | 0 | 0 | 0 | 0 | 0 | 0 | 0 | 0 | Advance to knockout stage |
| 3 | D3 | 0 | 0 | 0 | 0 | 0 | 0 | 0 | 0 | Possible knockout stage based on ranking |
| 4 | D4 | 0 | 0 | 0 | 0 | 0 | 0 | 0 | 0 | |

First match(es) will be played: 11 June 2028. Source: UEFA
11 June 2028

| D3 | Match 7 | D4 |

Hill Dickinson Stadium, Liverpool
12 June 2028

| Northern Ireland (if qualified) | Match 8 | D2 |

Tottenham Hotspur Stadium, London

16 June 2028

| Northern Ireland (if qualified) | Match 19 | D3 |

Wembley Stadium, London
16 June 2028

| D2 | Match 20 | D4 |

City of Manchester Stadium, Manchester

20 June 2028

| D4 | Match 31 | Northern Ireland (if qualified) |

Villa Park, Birmingham
20 June 2028

| D2 | Match 32 | D3 |

St James' Park, Newcastle upon Tyne

=== Group E ===
| Pos | Team | Pld | W | D | L | GF | GA | GD | Pts | Qualification |
|---|---|---|---|---|---|---|---|---|---|---|
| 1 | E1 (Republic of Ireland, if qualified) | 0 | 0 | 0 | 0 | 0 | 0 | 0 | 0 | Advance to knockout stage |
| 2 | E2 | 0 | 0 | 0 | 0 | 0 | 0 | 0 | 0 | Advance to knockout stage |
| 3 | E3 | 0 | 0 | 0 | 0 | 0 | 0 | 0 | 0 | Possible knockout stage based on ranking |
| 4 | E4 | 0 | 0 | 0 | 0 | 0 | 0 | 0 | 0 | |

First match(es) will be played: 12 June 2028. Source: UEFA
12 June 2028

| Republic of Ireland (if qualified) | Match 9 | E2 |

Aviva Stadium, Dublin
12 June 2028

| E3 | Match 10 | E4 |

St James' Park, Newcastle upon Tyne

16 June 2028

| Republic of Ireland (if qualified) | Match 21 | E3 |

Aviva Stadium, Dublin
17 June 2028

| E2 | Match 22 | E4 |

Hill Dickinson Stadium, Liverpool

21 June 2028

| E4 | Match 33 | Republic of Ireland (if qualified) |

Aviva Stadium, Dublin
21 June 2028

| E2 | Match 34 | E3 |

Tottenham Hotspur Stadium, London

=== Group F ===
| Pos | Team | Pld | W | D | L | GF | GA | GD | Pts | Qualification |
|---|---|---|---|---|---|---|---|---|---|---|
| 1 | F1 (Scotland, if qualified) | 0 | 0 | 0 | 0 | 0 | 0 | 0 | 0 | Advance to knockout stage |
| 2 | F2 | 0 | 0 | 0 | 0 | 0 | 0 | 0 | 0 | Advance to knockout stage |
| 3 | F3 | 0 | 0 | 0 | 0 | 0 | 0 | 0 | 0 | Possible knockout stage based on ranking |
| 4 | F4 | 0 | 0 | 0 | 0 | 0 | 0 | 0 | 0 | |

First match(es) will be played: 13 June 2028. Source: UEFA
13 June 2028

| Scotland (if qualified) | Match 11 | F2 |

Hampden Park, Glasgow
13 June 2028

| F3 | Match 12 | F4 |

City of Manchester Stadium, Manchester

17 June 2028

| Scotland (if qualified) | Match 23 | F3 |

Hampden Park, Glasgow
17 June 2028

| F2 | Match 24 | F4 |

St James' Park, Newcastle upon Tyne

21 June 2028

| F4 | Match 35 | Scotland (if qualified) |

Hampden Park, Glasgow
21 June 2028

| F2 | Match 36 | F3 |

Millennium Stadium, Cardiff

=== Ranking of third-placed teams ===
| Pos | Grp | Team | Pld | W | D | L | GF | GA | GD | Pts | Qualification |
|---|---|---|---|---|---|---|---|---|---|---|---|
| 1 | A | Third place Group A | 0 | 0 | 0 | 0 | 0 | 0 | 0 | 0 | Advance to knockout stage |
| 2 | B | Third place Group B | 0 | 0 | 0 | 0 | 0 | 0 | 0 | 0 | Advance to knockout stage |
| 3 | C | Third place Group C | 0 | 0 | 0 | 0 | 0 | 0 | 0 | 0 | Advance to knockout stage |
| 4 | D | Third place Group D | 0 | 0 | 0 | 0 | 0 | 0 | 0 | 0 | Advance to knockout stage |
| 5 | E | Third place Group E | 0 | 0 | 0 | 0 | 0 | 0 | 0 | 0 | |
| 6 | F | Third place Group F | 0 | 0 | 0 | 0 | 0 | 0 | 0 | 0 | |

First match(es) will be played: 9 June 2028. Source: UEFA

== Knockout stage ==
In the knockout stage, if a match is level at the end of normal playing time, extra time is played (two periods of 15 minutes each). If still tied after extra time, the match is decided by a penalty shoot-out.

As with every tournament since UEFA Euro 1984, there is no third place play-off.

The specific match-ups involving the third-placed teams depended on which four third-placed teams qualify for the round of 16:

| Third-placed teams qualify from groups | | | | | | 1B vs | 1C vs | 1E vs | 1F vs |
|---|---|---|---|---|---|---|---|---|---|
| A | B | C | D | | | 3A | 3D | 3B | 3C |
| A | B | C | | E | | 3A | 3E | 3B | 3C |
| A | B | C | | | F | 3A | 3F | 3B | 3C |
| A | B | | D | E | | 3D | 3E | 3A | 3B |
| A | B | | D | | F | 3D | 3F | 3A | 3B |
| A | B | | | E | F | 3E | 3F | 3B | 3A |
| A | | C | D | E | | 3E | 3D | 3C | 3A |
| A | | C | D | | F | 3F | 3D | 3C | 3A |
| A | | C | | E | F | 3E | 3F | 3C | 3A |
| A | | | D | E | F | 3E | 3F | 3D | 3A |
| | B | C | D | E | | 3E | 3D | 3B | 3C |
| | B | C | D | | F | 3F | 3D | 3C | 3B |
| | B | C | | E | F | 3F | 3E | 3C | 3B |
| | B | | D | E | F | 3F | 3E | 3D | 3B |
| | | C | D | E | F | 3F | 3E | 3D | 3C |

All times are local, BST/IST (UTC+1).

=== Bracket ===
Round of 16
25 June – Newcastle upon Tyne
Winner Group B
3rd Group A/D/E/F
24 June – Cardiff
Winner Group A
Runner-up Group C
26 June – Glasgow
Winner Group F
3rd Group A/B/C
26 June – London (Tottenham)
Runner-up Group D
Runner-up Group E
27 June – Dublin
Winner Group E
3rd Group A/B/C/D
27 June – Birmingham
Winner Group D
Runner-up Group F
25 June – Manchester
Winner Group C
3rd Group D/E/F
24 June – Liverpool
Runner-up Group A
Runner-up Group B

Quarter-finals
30 June – London (Wembley)
Winner Match 39
Winner Match 37
30 June – Dublin
Winner Match 41
Winner Match 42
1 July – Glasgow
Winner Match 44
Winner Match 43
1 July – Cardiff
Winner Match 40
Winner Match 38

Semi-finals
4 July – London (Wembley)
Winner Match 45
Winner Match 46
5 July – London (Wembley)
Winner Match 47
Winner Match 48

Final
9 July – London (Wembley)
Winner Match 49
Winner Match 50

=== Round of 16 ===
24 June 2028

| Winner Group A | Match 37 | Runner-up Group C |

Millennium Stadium, Cardiff

24 June 2028

| Runner-up Group A | Match 38 | Runner-up Group B |

Hill Dickinson Stadium, Liverpool

25 June 2028

| Winner Group B | Match 39 | 3rd Group A/D/E/F |

St James' Park, Newcastle upon Tyne

25 June 2028

| Winner Group C | Match 40 | 3rd Group D/E/F |

City of Manchester Stadium, Manchester

26 June 2028

| Winner Group F | Match 41 | 3rd Group A/B/C |

Hampden Park, Glasgow

26 June 2028

| Runner-up Group D | Match 42 | Runner-up Group E |

Tottenham Hotspur Stadium, London

27 June 2028

| Winner Group D | Match 43 | Runner-up Group F |

Villa Park, Birmingham

27 June 2028

| Winner Group E | Match 44 | 3rd Group A/B/C/D |

Aviva Stadium, Dublin

=== Quarter-finals ===
30 June 2028

| Winner Match 39 | Match 45 | Winner Match 37 |

Wembley Stadium, London

30 June 2028

| Winner Match 41 | Match 46 | Winner Match 42 |

Aviva Stadium, Dublin

1 July 2028

| Winner Match 44 | Match 47 | Winner Match 43 |

Hampden Park, Glasgow

1 July 2028

| Winner Match 40 | Match 48 | Winner Match 38 |

Millennium Stadium, Cardiff

=== Semi-finals ===
4 July 2028

| Winner Match 45 | Match 49 | Winner Match 46 |

Wembley Stadium, London

5 July 2028

| Winner Match 47 | Match 50 | Winner Match 48 |

Wembley Stadium, London

=== Final ===
9 July 2028
17:00

| Winner Match 49 | Match 51 | Winner Match 50 |

Wembley Stadium, London

== Marketing ==
=== Logo ===
The official logo was unveiled on 12 November 2025 at local events across the United Kingdom and Ireland. This included the brand being showcased on the screens of the Piccadilly Circus at 20:28 local time. The logo, designed by Portuguese agency VML Branding, depicts the Henri Delaunay Trophy, with the uppercase text "UEFA Euro 28" and "UK & Ireland" wrapped around the trophy in "vibrant colours inspired by the host nations". The four host nations and eight host cities each have their own unique logo, including local variants in Welsh and Irish. The city logos feature the following local sights:

- Birmingham: Library of Birmingham
- Cardiff: Cardiff Castle
- Dublin: Samuel Beckett Bridge
- Glasgow: SEC Armadillo
- Liverpool: Royal Liver Building
- London: London Eye, Palace of Westminster, Big Ben
- Manchester: Manchester Town Hall
- Newcastle upon Tyne: Tyne Bridge

=== Broadcasting rights ===
==== UEFA ====
| Territory | Rights holders | Ref |
|---|---|---|
| Albania | SuperSport; TV Klan | |
| Armenia | Armenia TV | |
| Austria | ServusTV; ORF | |
| Belgium | RTBF; VRT | |
| Bosnia and Herzegovina | BHRT | |
| Bulgaria | Nova | |
| Croatia | HRT | |
| Cyprus | CyBC | |
| Czech Republic | ČT | |
| Denmark | DR; TV 2 | |
| Estonia | Postimees | |
| Finland | Yle | |
| France | TF1; beIN Sports | |
| Georgia | GPB | |
| Germany | ARD; ZDF; Magenta TV | |
| Greece | ERT | |
| Hungary | MTVA | |
| Iceland | RÚV | |
| Ireland | BBC; ITV; S4C (Select games in Welsh); RTÉ | |
| Italy | RAI; Sky Sport | |
| Kosovo | Artmotion | |
| Latvia | TV3 | |
| Liechtenstein | SRG SSR | |
| Lithuania | TV3 | |
| Malta | PBS | |
| Moldova | TRM | |
| Montenegro | Arena Sport | |
| Netherlands | NOS | |
| North Macedonia | Arena Sport | |
| Norway | NRK; TV 2 | |
| Poland | TVP | |
| Romania | Pro TV | |
| Russia | Okko Sport | |
| San Marino | RAI | |
| Serbia | RTS; Arena Sport | |
| Slovakia | TV Markíza | |
| Slovenia | RTV; Sport Klub | |
| Spain | RTVE | |
| Sweden | SVT; TV4 | |
| Switzerland | SRG SSR | |
| Turkey | Acun Medya | |
| United Kingdom | BBC; ITV; S4C (Select games in Welsh); RTÉ | |

==== Rest of the world ====
| Territory | Rights holders | Ref |
|---|---|---|
| Brazil | CazéTV | |
| Canada | TSN (English); TVA Sports (French) | |
| Central America | ESPN | |
| China | iQIYI | |
| Indian subcontinent | Sony Sports Network | |
| Indonesia | MNC Media | |
| Mexico | Sky México | |
| New Zealand | TVNZ | |
| Pacific Islands | Digicel | |
| South America (Note: Excluding Brazil.) | ESPN | |
| South Korea | TVING; tvN Sports | |
| Sub-Saharan Africa | New World TV; SuperSport | |
| Taiwan | ELTA | |
| Thailand | MONOMAX Sports | |
| United States | Fox Sports; Fubo Sports Network (English) | |
| United States | TelevisaUnivision (Spanish) | |

=== Sponsorship ===
Official global sponsors

- Adidas
- Alibaba Group (Alibaba Cloud, Qwen and AliExpress brands)
- Ant Group (Alipay, Ant Fortune, AQ and WorldFirst brands)
- Atos
- Betano
- Booking.com
- Campari Group (Aperol)
- Carlsberg
- Coca-Cola
- Hisense
- Lidl
- Strauss
- Visit Qatar
- Würth

Official national sponsors

- BT
