= Atatürk Olympic Stadium =

Stadium in Istanbul, Turkey

Atatürk Olimpiyat Stadı
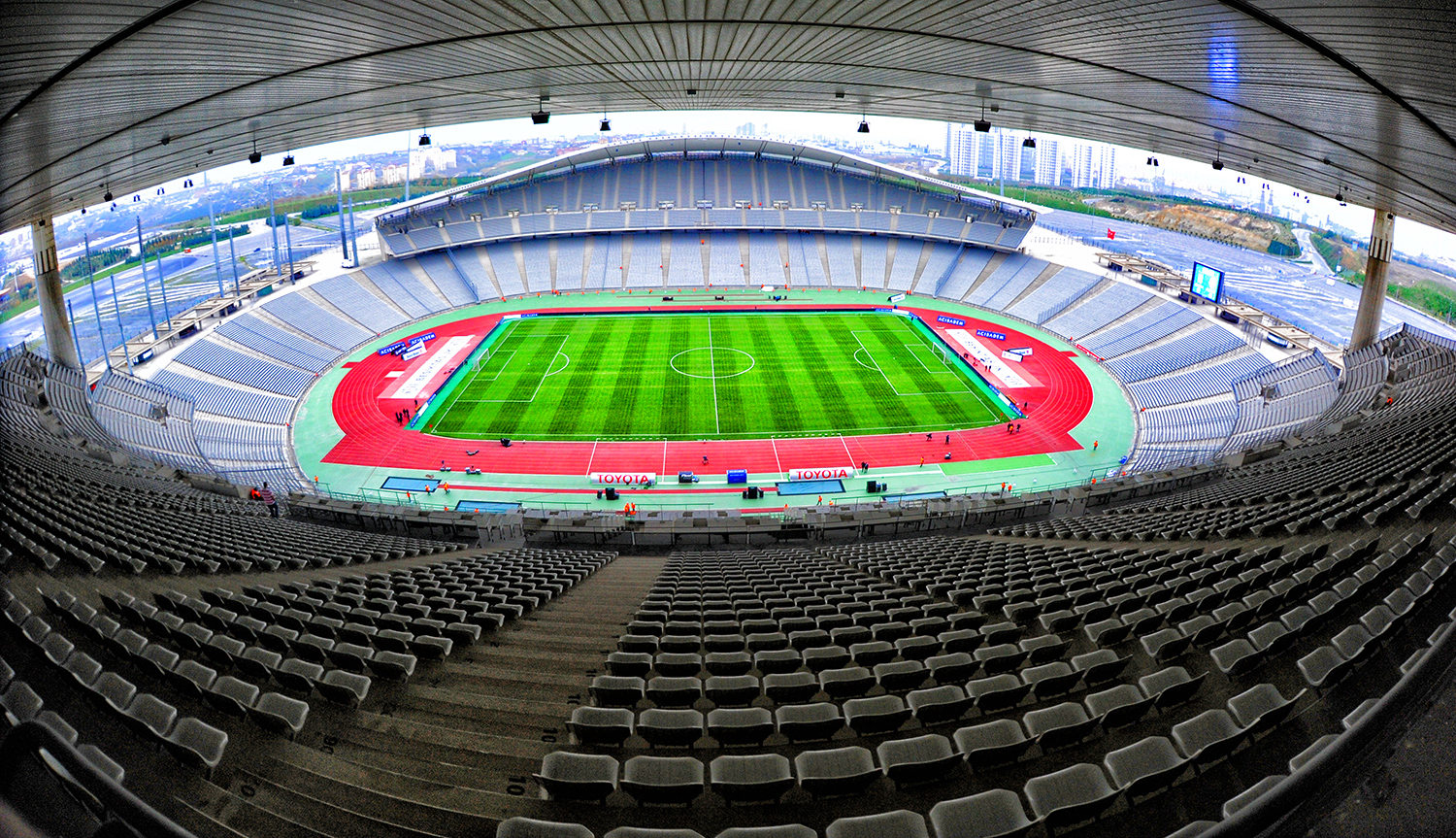
- UEFA

- Location in Istanbul Location in Turkey
- Full name: Atatürk Olimpiyat Stadyumu
- Location: Başakşehir, Istanbul, Turkey
- Coordinates: 41°04′28″N 28°45′57″E
- Owner: Government of Turkey
- Capacity: 77,563 Capacity history: 80,597 (2002–2005) 76,092 (2005–2019) 76,761 (2019–2020) 75,145 (2020–2021) 74,753 (2021–2022) 77,563 (2022–)
- Executive suites: 34
- Surface: Grass
- Scoreboard: Yes
- Record attendance: Football: 79,414 (Galatasaray–Olympiacos, 31 July 2002); Concert: 118,000 (Kanye West, 30 May 2026)
- Field size: 105 x 68 m
- Public transit: Olimpiyat

Construction
- Groundbreaking: 28 November 1997
- Built: 1997–2002
- Opened: 31 July 2002; 24 years ago
- Renovated: 2005, 2020
- Cost: US$140 million ($251 million in 2025 dollars)
- Architects: Michel Macary; Aymeric Zublena

Tenants
- Turkey national football team Galatasaray (2003–2004); İstanbul Başakşehir (2007–2014); Kasımpaşa (2007–2008); Beşiktaş (2013–2016); Fatih Karagümrük (2020–2026)

Website
- www.ataturkolimpiyatstadi.gov.tr

The Atatürk Olympic Stadium (Turkish: Atatürk Olimpiyat Stadyumu, pronounced [aˈtatyɾc]) is a stadium in Istanbul, Turkey. Located in the western district of Başakşehir, it is the largest-capacity stadium in the country, and largest permanent track and field stadium outside Africa and Asia by capacity. The stadium is named after Mustafa Kemal Atatürk, the founder and first President of the Republic of Turkey. Its construction began in 1999 and was completed in 2002. It was originally built for Turkey's bid for the 2008 Olympic Games that were ultimately awarded to Beijing, China. It cost about US$140 million.

With its 77,563 (all-seater) capacity and Olympic size, it was granted the "5-star sports complex" title by the UEFA in 2004, enabling it to host the finals of UEFA events. The 2005 UEFA Champions League Final between Milan and Liverpool was played at the Atatürk Olympic Stadium on 25 May 2005. The stadium is also certified by the IAAF and IOC as a first-class venue for track and field, and has hosted several European athletic competitions. The stadium was originally scheduled to stage its second Champions League final between Paris Saint-Germain and Bayern Munich on 30 May 2020, but following the COVID-19 pandemic in Europe the match was postponed and later rescheduled to August at the Estádio da Luz in Lisbon, Portugal, behind closed doors; the stadium was then set to hold the 2021 final between Manchester City and Chelsea instead, but the match was once again moved to Portugal, this time at the Estádio do Dragão in Porto. The stadium hosted the 2023 UEFA Champions League Final between Manchester City and Inter Milan.

Süper Lig football team Istanbul BB used the venue as their home stadium until they moved to the Başakşehir Fatih Terim Stadium in 2014. Galatasaray played its home games at the Atatürk Olympic Stadium during the 2003–04 football season because their own venue, the Ali Sami Yen Stadium, was under renovation. Galatasaray eventually returned to Ali Sami Yen for the 2004–05 season, but played 2006–07 UEFA Champions League group stage matches at the Atatürk Olympic Stadium. Sivasspor also played some of its Süper Lig home games at the Atatürk Olympic Stadium due to bad weather conditions in their original hometown stadium. Beşiktaş used the arena in the 2013–14 season to play most of their home games, with the reasoning being the same as Galatasaray's, while their own stadium, the Vodafone Park, was under construction. Since their promotion to the Süper Lig in 2020, Fatih Karagümrük uses the stadium as its home.

== Design and construction ==
Istanbul Atatürk Olympic Stadium was originally conceived for the city's 2008 Olympic Games bid.

The stadium's two steel roofs (weighing 2,800 t and 1,300 t) were produced by Tekfen's Steel Structure Fabrication Plant in Ceyhan, Adana. The west roof, designed in the form of a crescent and principally composed of a 1,000 t main beam called mega-truss, is supported by two reinforced concrete shafts with 196 m span.

With its 134 entrances and 148 exit gates, the Olympic Stadium allows 80,000 spectators to evacuate within 7.5 minutes, in case of an emergency. Two annex fields (for warm up / training purposes) are connected directly to the Olympic Stadium with a tunnel.

The Olympic Stadium's technical infrastructure and design ensure optimal visibility from all stands; a homogeneous sound level (102 dB) with modern speaker systems, and a 1,400 lux illumination covering all areas of the stadium.

A 42,200 m^{2} commercial centre is situated under the west roof, with a front facade length of 450 m and a total of 6 floors (3 floors below ground level.)

== Renovations and events ==
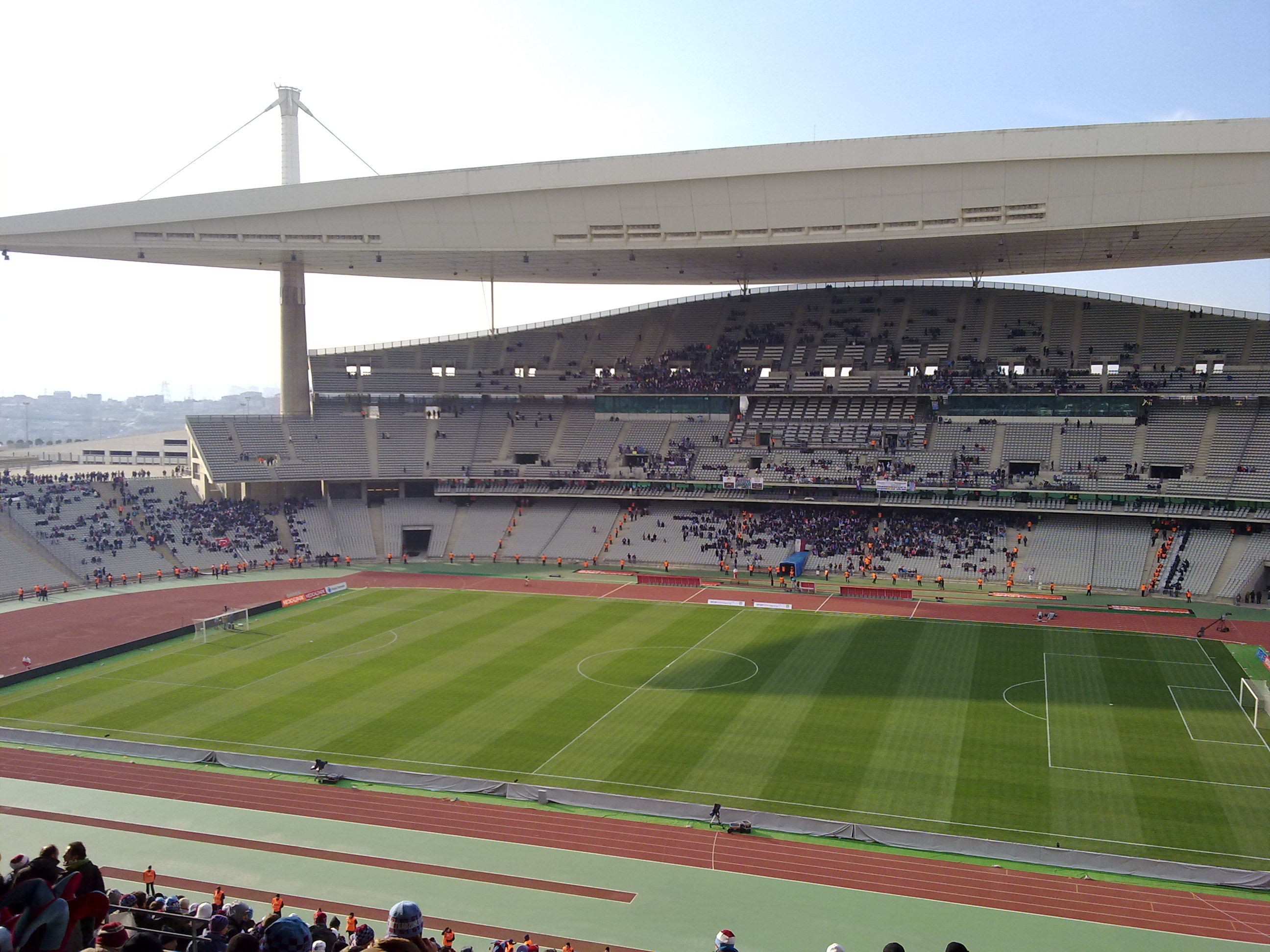
Interior view of the stadium

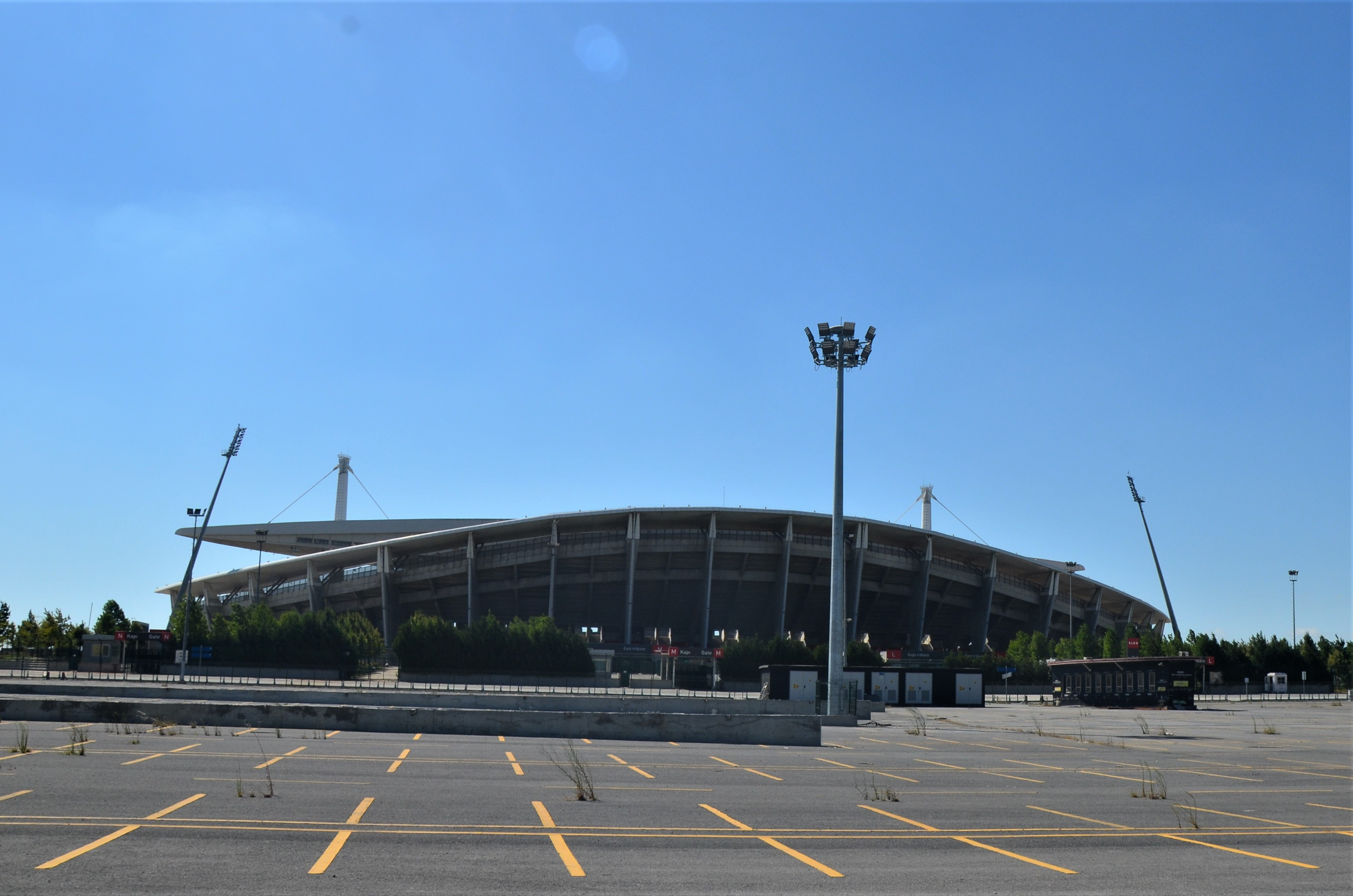
Exterior view of the stadium

UEFA Champions League finals
Season	Winners	Score	Runners-up	Attendance
2004–05	Liverpool (England)	3–3	(Italy) Milan	69,000
2022–23	Manchester City (England)	1–0	(Italy) Inter Milan	71,412

=== 2005 UEFA Champions League Final ===
From 2002 to 2005, the stadium had a capacity of 80,597 (all-seater). This was later reduced to 76,092 (all-seater) by removing the seats from where it was not possible to see the entire pitch, prior to the 2005 UEFA Champions League Final, the final match of Europe's primary club football competition in the 2004–05 season. The showpiece event (dubbed "The Miracle of Istanbul") was contested between Liverpool of England and Milan of Italy on 25 May 2005.

=== UEFA Euro 2016 plans ===
The stadium was part of the Turkish UEFA Euro 2016 bid. To meet all requirements of UEFA for being able to organise the championship, the authorities planned to take major reconstruction works on this stadium. It was planned to increase the stadium's capacity to over 90,000 spectators and making it to the world's largest stadium with every seat under cover. To increase the net and gross capacity to 81,106 and 94,555 respectively, the pitch would have been lowered by 2.15 metres. In order to provide better convenience for the VIP guests and the media, all existing hospitality areas at levels 3 and 4 would have been extended. Furthermore, 12 new boxes were planned to be added to the west stand and 32 to the east stand in order to add to the current number of 36 skyboxes; making a total of 80 skyboxes after the reconstruction.

=== 2023 UEFA Champions League final ===
The 2020 UEFA Champions League Final was scheduled to be played at the stadium on 30 May 2020. However the final was postponed due to the COVID-19 pandemic in Europe and later relocated to the Estádio da Luz, Lisbon. It was due to stage the following season's final, however this was relocated by UEFA on 13 May 2021 because of the COVID-19 pandemic in Turkey. On 16 July 2021, UEFA announced that the stadium is scheduled to host the 2023 UEFA Champions League final. On 10 June 2023, the match was played between English side Manchester City and Italian side Inter Milan. Manchester City won the match 1–0 to claim their first ever UEFA Champions League title.

=== UEFA Euro 2024 plans ===
For the UEFA Euro 2024 bid the Turkish Football Federation planned to rebuild the stadium. The stands would be closer to the pitch, making it a football stadium with a new capacity of 92,208 Because of the removal of the athletics track, Turkey plans a new Olympic stadium near to Bosphorus for prospects for a future Summer Olympics. The rebuild was made by Manchester-based British architecture company AFL Architects. Ultimately, the Euro 2024 tournament would be awarded to Germany instead.

=== UEFA Euro 2032 renovations ===
For the UEFA Euro 2032 the Turkish Football Federation plans to renovate the stadium. The stands would be closer to the pitch, making it a football stadium with a new capacity of 72,000. It is expected to be lowered than its current capacity in time for that year as one of the ten Turkish venues in the Italian-Turkish joint bid. Ultimately, the Euro 2032 tournament has been awarded to Turkey along with Italy.

== Concerts ==
=== Ye Live Concert Tour ===
On 30 May 2026, American rapper Kanye West gave a sold-out concert at the stadium with 118,000 fans in attendance, making it the largest performance of West's career. The concert broke the record for the largest stadium attendance in history.

=== U2 360° Tour ===
On 6 September 2010, the renowned Irish rock band U2 gave a sold-out concert at the stadium with 54,278 fans in attendance, as a part of their U2 360° Tour, the opening act of which was performed by the group Snow Patrol.

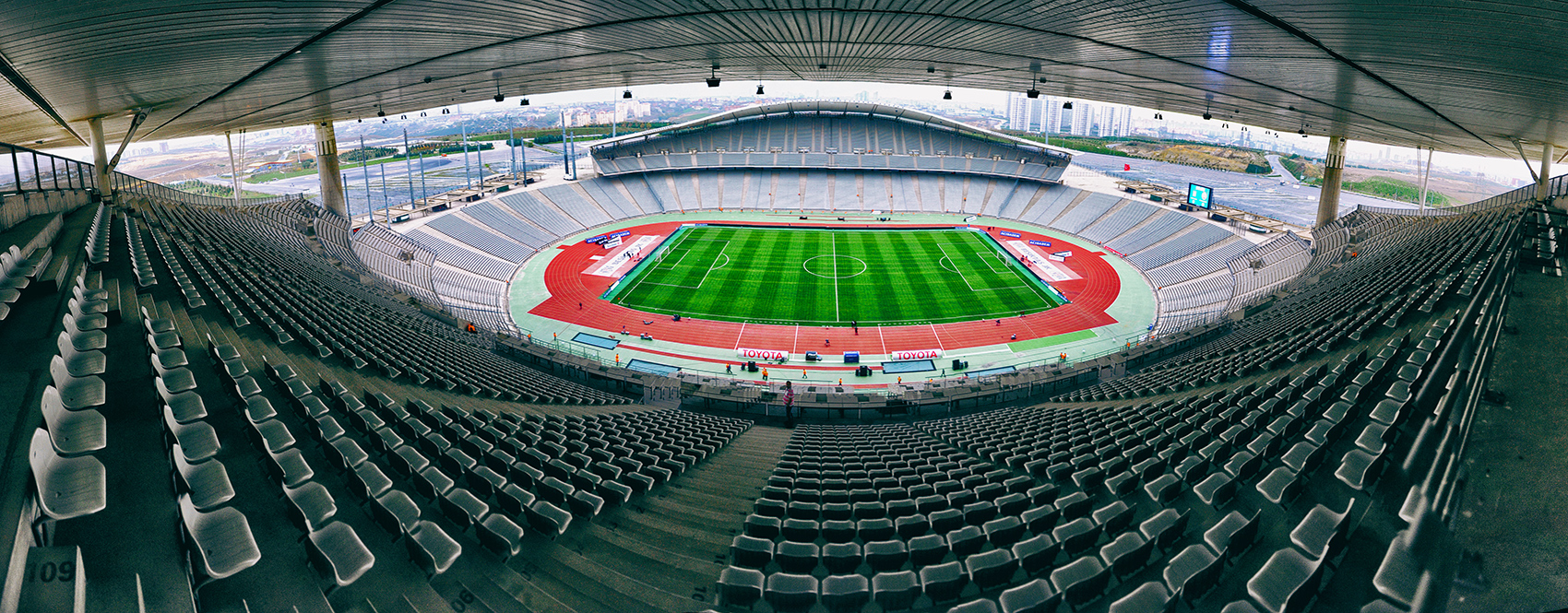
A panoramic view of Atatürk Olympic Stadium in Istanbul

== Records ==
Attendance Records
Rank	Attendance	Date	Game
1	118,000	30 May 2026	BULLY Tour 2026
2	79,414	31 July 2002	Galatasaray SK – Olympiacos CFP
3	77,512	22 September 2013	Beşiktaş JK – Galatasaray SK
4	71,412	10 June 2023	Manchester City – Inter Milan
5	71,334	21 September 2003	Galatasaray SK – Fenerbahçe SK
6	71,230	12 September 2006	Galatasaray SK – FC Girondins de Bordeaux
7	70,847	03 August 2024	Galatasaray SK – Beşiktaş JK
8	69,000	25 May 2005	A.C. Milan – Liverpool F.C.
9	68,515	15 May 2022	Trabzonspor – Altay SK
10	66,300	13 August 2003	Galatasaray SK – PFC CSKA

== See also ==
- List of football stadiums in Turkey
- Istanbul bid for the 2020 Summer Olympics
- Lists of stadiums

Preceded by Arena AufSchalke; Gelsenkirchen	UEFA Champions League; Final venue 2005	Succeeded by Stade de France; Saint-Denis
Preceded by Stade de France; Saint-Denis	UEFA Champions League; Final venue 2023	Succeeded by Wembley Stadium; London
