= New Ankara Stadium =

Football stadium in Ankara, Turkey

Ankara Stadium
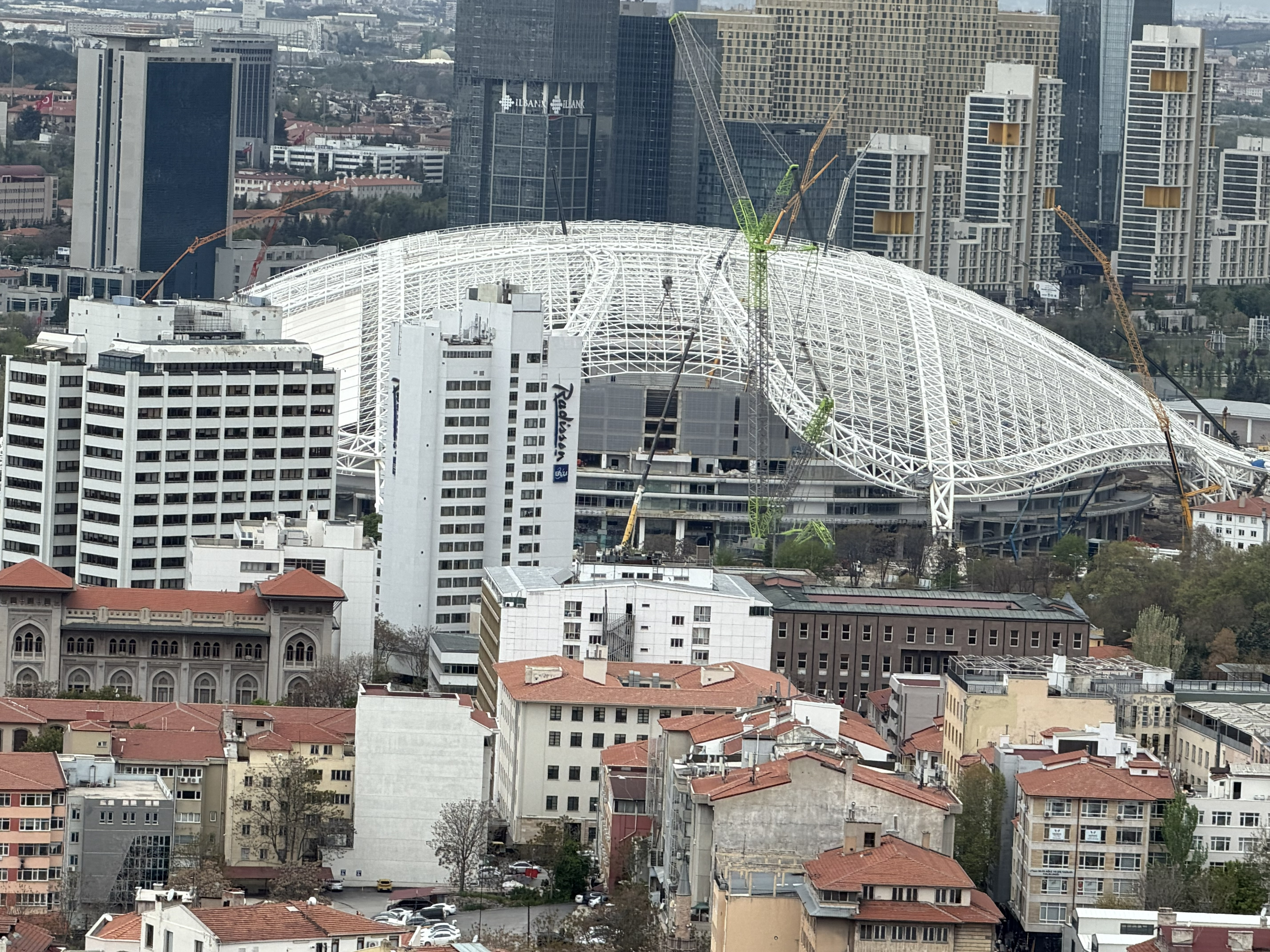
- Ankara Stadium under construction in May 2026

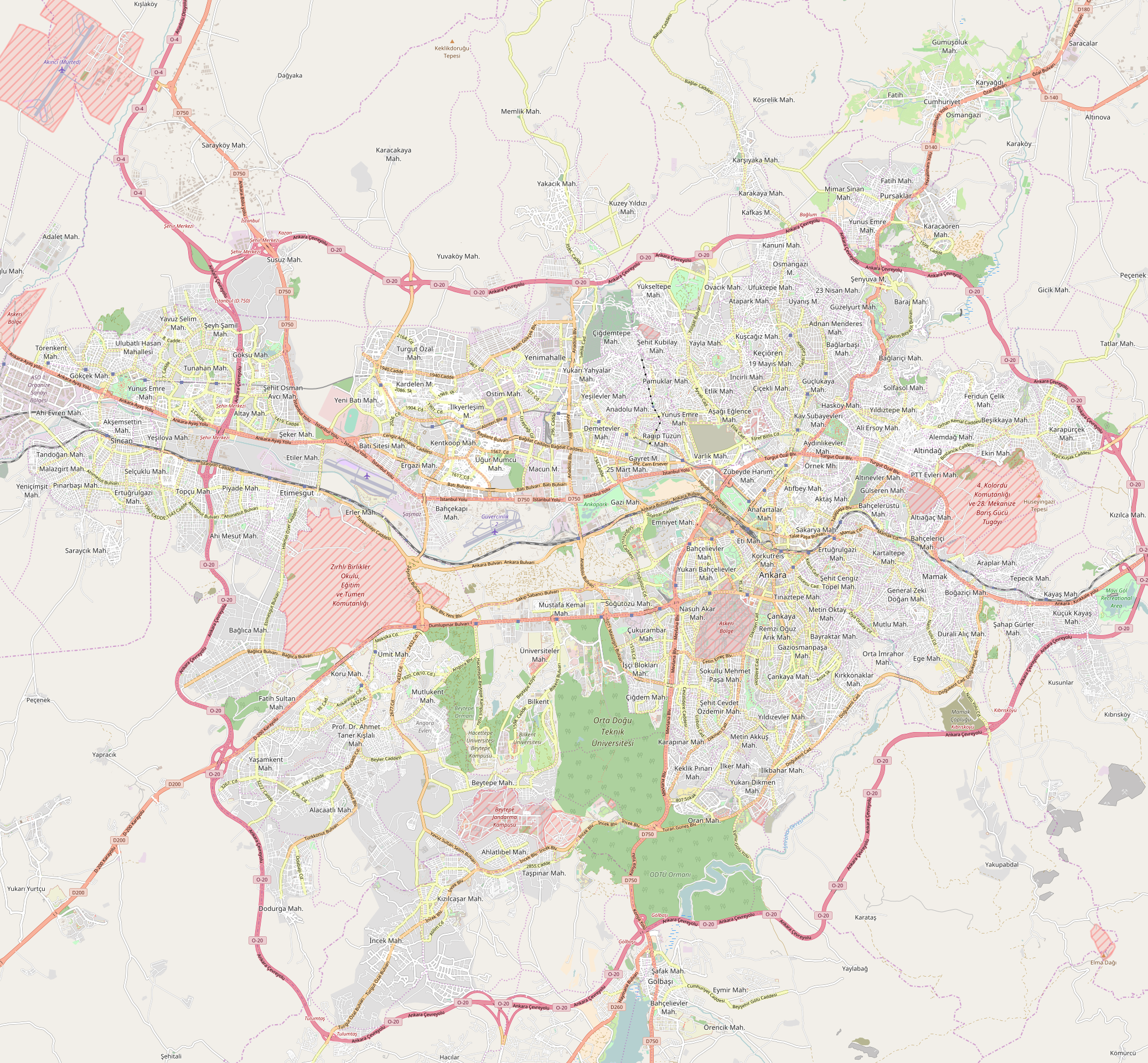
- Location in Ankara Location in Turkey
- Location: Altındağ, Ankara, Turkey
- Coordinates: 39°56′25″N 32°50′45″E
- Owner: Ministry of Youth and Sports
- Seating type: All-seater
- Capacity: 51,050
- Surface: Grass
- Public transit: Ankara metro M1 and M4 lines, Başkentray, YHT, EGO buses and Dolmuş

Construction
- Groundbreaking: July 2022
- Built: 2022–

Tenant
- Turkey national football team

The new Ankara Stadium is a football stadium currently under construction on the site of the historic 19 Mayıs Stadium in Altındağ, Ankara. Planned to seat 51,050, it will be the home of the Turkey national football team. The new Ankara Stadium is also a potential venue to host matches for the UEFA Euro 2032, which will be co-hosted by Italy and Turkey.

Construction of the stadium commenced in July 2022.

== See also ==
- List of football stadiums in Turkey
- UEFA Euro 2032
