= Alibi marketing =

Alibi marketing and alibi branding are marketing and branding strategies used by companies to circumvent restrictions on advertising certain classes of products by instead advertising an "alibi", which does not directly reference the restricted product but is likely to remind many viewers of the brand. The alibi may be a different product or simply a word or symbol reminiscent of the restricted product. Common advertising restrictions are on tobacco and on alcohol, especially in sports sponsorship, and so these are areas where alibi marketing is also common. Regulators may see alibi marketing as a loophole needing to be cut off by redrafting the restrictive regulations.

Examples of alibis include:

- The Dunhill Links Championship, a golf tournament sponsored from 2001 by Dunhill cigarettes, was sponsored after 2005 by Alfred Dunhill Limited, the parent company which also makes luxury goods. A spokesman for the luxury goods side said "our Dunhill has a lower-case d, while Dunhill the cigarette company has a capital D". In 2006 the tournament was renamed the Alfred Dunhill Links Championship.
- The Évin Law prohibits alcohol advertising on television in France. International sports events hosted there by international federations (IFs) based elsewhere may have sponsorsip deals with alcohol companies, who need to be creative to avail of the IF's opportunity without falling foul of the French law.
  - When the European Rugby Champions Cup was branded the "Heineken Cup", it was known in France as the "H Cup".
  - At UEFA Euro 2016, sponsor Carlsberg referenced its widely known slogan "probably the best lager in the world" in pitchside hoardings reading "Probably" and "…the best in the world".
  - At the 2023 Rugby World Cup, sponsor Asahi Breweries advertised its alcohol free beer, and used other words in the same typeface as that on its Asahi packaging.
- In 1997 Liverpool F.C. used "Probably…" instead of the Carlsberg logo of their shirt sponsor at a televised pre-season friendly in Norway. (In contrast, when Liverpool played Auxerre in 2003, the shirt front was blank.)
- Makers of beer, cider, and hard liquors like rum and gin have extended their brands to non-alcoholic equivalents; some critics see this effort as motivated at least in part by alibi marketing for the full-alcohol product.
- The Scuderia Ferrari team in Formula One motor racing was sponsored by Marlboro. After the ban on tobacco sponsorship in 2007, the car's livery continued to have a design reminiscent of the Marlboro packaging, which the team justified on the basis that the colour red was also associated with Ferrari.

== See also ==
- Ambush marketing
- Brand extension
- Guerilla marketing
