= Republic of Ireland at the UEFA European Championship =

International football delegation

The UEFA European Championship is the main football competition of the men's national football teams governed by UEFA (the Union of European Football Associations). Held every four years since 1960, in the even-numbered year between World Cup tournaments, it was originally called the UEFA European Nations' Cup, changing to the current name in 1968. Starting with the 1996 tournament, specific championships are often referred to in the form "Euro 2008" or whichever year is appropriate. Prior to entering the tournament all teams other than the host nations (which qualify automatically) compete in a qualifying process.

The Republic of Ireland have participated in three European Championship finals, those held in 1988, 2012 and 2016.

The side have played ten matches: winning two, drawing two and losing six. They have scored six goals and conceded sixteen. In 2012, they equalled the worst performance by a team in European Championship history. They finished bottom of their group and were the first team eliminated from the tournament following a 4–0 defeat to Spain in their second game. In 2016, the nation reached the second round for the first time, following a 1–0 group stage victory against Italy.

== Overall record ==
UEFA European Championship record									Qualification record						
Year	Round	Position	Pld	W	D	L	GF	GA	Pld	W	D	L	GF	GA	Position
(France) 1960	Did not qualify								2	1	0	1	2	4	Preliminary round
(Spain) 1964	Did not qualify								6	2	2	2	9	12	Quarter-finals
(Italy) 1968	Did not qualify								6	2	1	3	5	8	3/4
(Belgium) 1972	Did not qualify								6	0	1	5	3	17	4/4
(Socialist Federal Republic of Yugoslavia) 1976	Did not qualify								6	3	1	2	11	5	2/4
(Italy) 1980	Did not qualify								8	2	3	3	9	8	3/5
(France) 1984	Did not qualify								8	4	1	3	20	10	3/5
(West Germany) 1988	Group stage	5th	3	1	1	1	2	2	8	4	3	1	10	5	1/5
(Sweden) 1992	Did not qualify								6	2	4	0	13	6	2/4
(England) 1996	Did not qualify								11	5	2	4	17	13	2/6; Lost Play-off
(Belgium) (Netherlands) 2000	Did not qualify								10	5	3	2	15	7	2/5; Lost Play-off
(Portugal) 2004	Did not qualify								8	3	2	3	10	11	3/5
(Austria) (Switzerland) 2008	Did not qualify								12	4	5	3	17	14	3/7
(Poland) (Ukraine) 2012	Group stage	16th	3	0	0	3	1	9	12	7	4	1	20	8	2/6; Won Play-off
(France) 2016	Round of 16	15th	4	1	1	2	3	6	12	6	4	2	22	8	3/6; Won Play-off
(Europe) 2020	Did not qualify								11	3	5	1	7	5	3/5; Lost Play-off
(Germany) 2024	Did not qualify								8	2	0	6	9	10	4/5
(United Kingdom) (Republic of Ireland) 2028	To be determined								To be determined						
(Italy) (Turkey) 2032	To be determined								To be determined						
Total	Round of 16	3/17	10	2	2	6	6	17	138	55	41	42	199	151	—

List of UEFA European Championship matches
Year	Round	Score	Result	Republic of Ireland scorers
1988	Group stage	Republic of Ireland 1–0 England	Win	Ray Houghton 6'
1988	Group stage	Republic of Ireland 1–1 Soviet Union	Draw	Ronnie Whelan 38'
1988	Group stage	Republic of Ireland 0–1 Netherlands	Loss	—
2012	Group stage	Republic of Ireland 1–3 Croatia	Loss	Sean St Ledger 19'
2012	Group stage	Spain 4–0 Republic of Ireland	Loss	—
2012	Group stage	Italy 2–0 Republic of Ireland	Loss	—
2016	Group stage	Republic of Ireland 1–1 Sweden	Draw	Wes Hoolahan 49'
2016	Group stage	Belgium 3–0 Republic of Ireland	Loss	—
2016	Group stage	Italy 0–1 Republic of Ireland	Win	Robbie Brady 86'
2016	Round of 16	France 2–1 Republic of Ireland	Loss	Robbie Brady 2' (pen.)

== Euro 1988 ==
=== Qualification ===
Ireland qualified for the finals after winning Group 7 of the qualifying tournament. A late goal by Scotland's Gary Mackay against Bulgaria in Sofia ensured that Ireland won the group ahead of Bulgaria.

=== Tournament ===
Group stage

Pos	Team	Pld	W	D	L	GF	GA	GD	Pts	Qualification
1	Soviet Union	3	2	1	0	5	2	+3	5	Advance to knockout stage
2	Netherlands	3	2	0	1	4	2	+2	4	Advance to knockout stage
3	Republic of Ireland	3	1	1	1	2	2	0	3	
4	England	3	0	0	3	2	7	−5	0	

Source: UEFA
Rules for classification: Group stage tiebreakers
12 June 1988
15:30

England	0–1	Republic of Ireland
	Report	Houghton 6'

Neckarstadion, Stuttgart
Attendance: 51,373
Referee: Siegfried Kirschen (East Germany)

15 June 1988
20:15

Republic of Ireland	1–1	Soviet Union
Whelan 38'	Report	Protasov 74'

Niedersachsenstadion, Hanover
Attendance: 38,308
Referee: Emilio Soriano Aladrén (Spain)

18 June 1988
15:30

Republic of Ireland	0–1	Netherlands
	Report	Kieft 82'

Parkstadion, Gelsenkirchen
Attendance: 64,731
Referee: Horst Brummeier (Austria)

== Euro 2012 ==
=== Qualification ===
Ireland qualified for the finals after winning an unprecedented 5–1 aggregate play-off win against Estonia in the qualifying tournament. A 4–0 victory away in Tallinn and a 1–1 draw in Dublin ensured Ireland's qualification for UEFA Euro 2012.

=== Squad ===
On 7 May 2012, Giovanni Trapattoni announced his 23-man squad list for Euro 2012, along with a five-man stand-by list. Keith Fahey withdrew with a groin injury on 26 May and was replaced by Paul Green. On 29 May 2012, Kevin Foley was replaced by Paul McShane. The Ireland team was the only squad at the tournament to consist entirely of players from foreign leagues.

=== Tournament ===
Group stage

Pos	Team	Pld	W	D	L	GF	GA	GD	Pts	Qualification
1	Spain	3	2	1	0	6	1	+5	7	Advance to knockout stage
2	Italy	3	1	2	0	4	2	+2	5	Advance to knockout stage
3	Croatia	3	1	1	1	4	3	+1	4	
4	Republic of Ireland	3	0	0	3	1	9	−8	0	

Source: UEFA
Rules for classification: Group stage tiebreakers
10 June 2012
20:45 CEST

Republic of Ireland	1–3	Croatia
St Ledger 19'	Report	Mandžukić 3', 49'; Jelavić 43'

Stadion Miejski, Poznań
Attendance: 39,550
Referee: Björn Kuipers (Netherlands)

14 June 2012
20:45 CEST

Spain	4–0	Republic of Ireland
Torres 4', 70'; Silva 49'; Fàbregas 83'	Report

PGE Arena, Gdańsk
Attendance: 39,150
Referee: Pedro Proença (Portugal)

18 June 2012
20:45 CEST

Italy	2–0	Republic of Ireland
Cassano 35'; Balotelli 90'	Report

Stadion Miejski, Poznań
Attendance: 38,794
Referee: Cüneyt Çakır (Turkey)

== Euro 2016 ==
=== Squad ===
The Republic of Ireland announced their final squad for Euro 2016 on 31 May 2016. The group contained eight players who began their senior careers in Ireland's domestic league, the most for any Irish squad at a major tournament.

=== Tournament ===
Ireland began their campaign on 13 June at the Stade de France against Sweden. In the first half, John O'Shea almost got on the end of a set-piece in front of goal and Jeff Hendrick smashed the crossbar with a long range shot. The match was scoreless at half-time. In the 48th minute Séamus Coleman got down the right wing and crossed for Wes Hoolahan to catch the ball on the half volley with his right foot from twelve yards out to put Ireland in front. In the 71st minute Zlatan Ibrahimović cut in on the left side and crossed dangerously with Ciaran Clark heading the ball into his own net from close range. The match finished in a 1–1 draw.

On 18 June, Ireland lost 3–0 to Belgium in their second group game in Bordeaux. The match was 0–0 at half-time before Romelu Lukaku opened the scoring in the 48th minute with a low shot to the right corner. It was 2–0 in the 61st minute when Axel Witsel headed into the net from a Thomas Meunier cross from the right. The third goal came in the 70th minute, again from Romelu Lukaku who finished easily with a low shot to the right of the goalkeeper after a break away from Eden Hazard on the right.

On 22 June, Ireland defeated Italy 1–0 in their final group game to qualify for the knockout stage and a round of 16 match against hosts France. The only goal came in the 85th minute, a header by Robbie Brady after a cross from Wes Hoolahan on the right.

On 26 June, Ireland played France in the round of 16, at the Parc Olympique Lyonnais in Lyon. They took an early lead in the 2nd minute when Robbie Brady scored with a penalty, shooting low to the right of the goalkeeper and in off the post, after Shane Long had been fouled by Paul Pogba. Antoine Griezmann leveled the match in the 58th minute with a header after a cross from Bacary Sagna on the right and then scored a second three minutes later with a low shot to the goalkeepers left. Shane Duffy was sent-off in the 66th minutes when he fouled Griezmann as the last man. France went on to win the game 2–1 to advance to the quarter-finals.

Group stage

Pos	Team	Pld	W	D	L	GF	GA	GD	Pts	Qualification
1	Italy	3	2	0	1	3	1	+2	6 (Note: Head-to-head result: Belgium 0–2 Italy.)	Advance to knockout stage
2	Belgium	3	2	0	1	4	2	+2	6	Advance to knockout stage
3	Republic of Ireland	3	1	1	1	2	4	−2	4	Advance to knockout stage
4	Sweden	3	0	1	2	1	3	−2	1	

Source: UEFA
Rules for classification: Group stage tiebreakers
Notes:
13 June 2016
18:00

Republic of Ireland	1–1	Sweden
Hoolahan 48'	Report	Clark 71' (o.g.)

Stade de France, Saint-Denis
Attendance: 73,419
Referee: Milorad Mažić (Serbia)

18 June 2016
15:00

Belgium	3–0	Republic of Ireland
R. Lukaku 48', 70'; Witsel 61'	Report

Stade de Bordeaux, Bordeaux
Attendance: 39,493
Referee: Cüneyt Çakır (Turkey)

22 June 2016
21:00

Italy	0–1	Republic of Ireland
	Report	Brady 85'

Stade Pierre-Mauroy, Villeneuve-d'Ascq
Attendance: 44,268
Referee: Ovidiu Hațegan (Romania)

Ranking of third-placed teams

Pos	Grp	Team	Pld	W	D	L	GF	GA	GD	Pts	Qualification
1	B	Slovakia	3	1	1	1	3	3	0	4	Advance to knockout stage
2	E	Republic of Ireland	3	1	1	1	2	4	−2	4	Advance to knockout stage
3	F	Portugal	3	0	3	0	4	4	0	3	Advance to knockout stage
4	C	Northern Ireland	3	1	0	2	2	2	0	3	Advance to knockout stage
5	D	Turkey	3	1	0	2	2	4	−2	3	
6	A	Albania	3	1	0	2	1	3	−2	3	

Source: UEFA
Rules for classification: 1) Higher number of points obtained; 2) Superior goal difference; 3) Higher number of goals scored; 4) Fair play conduct; 5) Position in the UEFA national team coefficient ranking system.

Knockout stage

Round of 16

26 June 2016
15:00

France	2–1	Republic of Ireland
Griezmann 58', 61'	Report	Brady 2' (pen.)

Parc Olympique Lyonnais, Décines-Charpieu
Attendance: 56,279
Referee: Nicola Rizzoli (Italy)

== See also ==
- Republic of Ireland at the FIFA World Cup
- Republic of Ireland at the UEFA Nations League
