= Republic of Ireland at the FIFA World Cup =

International football delegation

The Republic of Ireland have appeared in the Men's FIFA World Cup in 1990, 1994, and 2002. They have always advanced from the group stage but have never advanced beyond the quarter-finals.

Their first appearance was in Italy at the 1990 Men's FIFA World Cup. 1990 was also their best performance in a major championship, where they reached the quarter-finals, despite not winning a single match in 90 minutes.

== Overall record ==
FIFA World Cup record									Qualification record						
Year	Round	Position	Pld	W	D*	L	GF	GA	Pld	W	D	L	GF	GA	Position
(Uruguay) 1930	Did not enter								Declined participation						
(Italy) 1934	Did not qualify								2	0	1	1	6	9	3/3
(France) 1938	Did not qualify								2	0	1	1	5	6	2/2
(Brazil) 1950	Did not qualify								4	1	1	2	6	7	2/3
(Switzerland) 1954	Did not qualify								4	2	0	2	8	6	2/3
(Sweden) 1958	Did not qualify								4	2	1	1	6	7	2/3
(Chile) 1962	Did not qualify								4	0	0	4	3	17	3/3
(England) 1966	Did not qualify								3	1	0	2	2	5	Lost Play-off
(Mexico) 1970	Did not qualify								6	0	1	5	3	14	4/4
(Germany) 1974	Did not qualify								4	1	1	2	4	5	2/3
(Argentina) 1978	Did not qualify								4	1	1	2	2	4	3/3
(Spain) 1982	Did not qualify								8	4	2	2	17	11	3/5
(Mexico) 1986	Did not qualify								8	2	2	4	5	10	4/5
(Italy) 1990	Quarter-finals	8th	5	0	4	1	2	3	8	5	2	1	10	2	2/5
(United States) 1994	Round of 16	16th	4	1	1	2	2	4	12	7	4	1	19	6	2/7
(France) 1998	Did not qualify								12	5	4	3	24	11	2/6; Lost Play-off
(South Korea) (Japan) 2002	Round of 16	12th	4	1	3	0	6	3	12	8	3	1	25	6	2/6; Won Play-off
(Germany) 2006	Did not qualify								10	4	5	1	12	5	4/6
(South Africa) 2010	Did not qualify								12	4	7	1	13	10	2/6; Lost Play-off
(Brazil) 2014	Did not qualify								10	4	2	4	16	17	4/6
(Russia) 2018	Did not qualify								12	5	5	2	13	11	2/6; Lost Play-off
(Qatar) 2022	Did not qualify								8	2	3	3	11	8	3/5
(Canada) (Mexico) (United States) 2026	Did not qualify								6	3	1	2	9	7	2/4; Lost Play-off
(Morocco) (Portugal) (Spain) 2030	To be determined														
(Saudi Arabia) 2034	To be determined														
Total	Quarter-finals	3/25	13	2	8	3	10	10	155	61	47	47	219	184	—

*Draws include knockout matches decided via penalty shoot-out.

List of FIFA World Cup matches
Year	Round	Score	Result	Republic of Ireland scorers
1990	Group stage	Republic of Ireland 1–1 England	Draw	Kevin Sheedy 73'
1990	Group stage	Republic of Ireland 1–1 Netherlands	Draw	Niall Quinn 71'
1990	Group stage	Republic of Ireland 0–0 Egypt	Draw	—
1990	Round of 16	Republic of Ireland 0–0 (5–4 p) Romania	Draw	—
1990	Quarter-finals	Republic of Ireland 0–1 Italy	Loss	—
1994	Group stage	Republic of Ireland 1–0 Italy	Win	Ray Houghton 11'
1994	Group stage	Republic of Ireland 1–2 Mexico	Loss	John Aldridge 84'
1994	Group stage	Republic of Ireland 0–0 Norway	Draw	—
1994	Round of 16	Republic of Ireland 0–2 Netherlands	Loss	—
2002	Group stage	Republic of Ireland 1–1 Cameroon	Draw	Matt Holland 52'
2002	Group stage	Republic of Ireland 1–1 Germany	Draw	Robbie Keane 90+2'
2002	Group stage	Republic of Ireland 3–0 Saudi Arabia	Win	Robbie Keane 7'; Gary Breen 61'; Damien Duff 87'
2002	Round of 16	Republic of Ireland 1–1 (2–3 p) Spain	Draw	Robbie Keane 90' (pen.)

== 1990 World Cup ==
=== Group F ===
Team	Pld	W	D	L	GF	GA	GD	Pts
England	3	1	2	0	2	1	+1	4
Republic of Ireland	3	0	3	0	2	2	0	3
Netherlands	3	0	3	0	2	2	0	3
Egypt	3	0	2	1	1	2	−1	2

Note: Republic of Ireland awarded second place by drawing of lots

11 June 1990
21:00

England	1–1	Republic of Ireland
Lineker 8'	(Report)	Sheedy 73'

Stadio Sant'Elia, Cagliari
Attendance: 35,238
Referee: Aron Schmidhuber (West Germany)

17 June 1990
17:00

Republic of Ireland	0–0	Egypt
	(Report)

Stadio La Favorita, Palermo
Attendance: 33,288
Referee: Marcel Van Langenhove (Belgium)

21 June 1990
21:00

Netherlands	1–1	Republic of Ireland
Gullit 10'	(Report)	Quinn 71'

Stadio La Favorita, Palermo
Attendance: 33,288
Referee: Michel Vautrot (France)

=== Knockout phase ===
25 June 1990
17:00

Republic of Ireland	0 – 0 (a.e.t.)	Romania
	(Report)
Penalties
Sheedy (penalty scored); Houghton (penalty scored); Townsend (penalty scored); Cascarino (penalty scored); O'Leary (penalty scored)	5–4	(penalty scored) Hagi; (penalty scored) Lupu; (penalty scored) Rotariu; (penalty scored) Lupescu; (penalty missed) Timofte

Stadio Luigi Ferraris, Genoa
Attendance: 31,818
Referee: José Roberto Wright (Brazil)

30 June 1990
21:00

Italy	1–0	Republic of Ireland
Schillaci 38'	(Report)

Stadio Olimpico, Rome
Attendance: 73,303
Referee: Carlos Silva Valente (Portugal)

== 1994 World Cup ==
=== Group E ===
Team	Pld	W	D	L	GF	GA	GD	Pts
Mexico	3	1	1	1	3	3	0	4
Republic of Ireland	3	1	1	1	2	2	0	4
Italy	3	1	1	1	2	2	0	4
Norway	3	1	1	1	1	1	0	4

18 June 1994
16:05 EDT

Italy	0–1	Republic of Ireland
	(Report)	Houghton 11'

Giants Stadium, East Rutherford
Attendance: 75,338
Referee: Mario van der Ende (Netherlands)

24 June 1994
12:35 EDT

Mexico	2–1	Republic of Ireland
García 42' 65'	(Report)	Aldridge 84'

Citrus Bowl, Orlando
Attendance: 60,790
Referee: Kurt Röthlisberger (Switzerland)

28 June 1994
12:35 EDT

Republic of Ireland	0–0	Norway
	(Report)

Giants Stadium, East Rutherford
Attendance: 72,404
Referee: José Torres Cadena (Colombia)

=== Knockout phase ===
4 July 1994
12:05 EDT

Netherlands	2–0	Republic of Ireland
Bergkamp 11'; Jonk 41'	(Report)

Citrus Bowl, Orlando
Attendance: 61,355
Referee: Peter Mikkelsen (Denmark)

== 2002 World Cup ==
=== Group E ===
Team	Pld	W	D	L	GF	GA	GD	Pts
Germany	3	2	1	0	11	1	+10	7
Republic of Ireland	3	1	2	0	5	2	+3	5
Cameroon	3	1	1	1	2	3	−1	4
Saudi Arabia	3	0	0	3	0	12	−12	0

1 June 2002
15:30

Republic of Ireland	1–1	Cameroon
Holland 52'	(Report)	Mboma 39'

Niigata Stadium, Niigata
Attendance: 33,679
Referee: Toru Kamikawa (Japan)

5 June 2002
20:30

Germany	1–1	Republic of Ireland
Klose 19'	(Report)	Robbie Keane 90+2'

Kashima Soccer Stadium, Kashima
Attendance: 35,854
Referee: Kim Milton Nielsen (Denmark)

11 June 2002
20:30

Saudi Arabia	0–3	Republic of Ireland
	(Report)	Robbie Keane 7'; Breen 61'; Duff 87'

International Stadium Yokohama, Yokohama
Attendance: 65,320
Referee: Falla N'Doye (Senegal)

=== Knockout phase ===
16 June 2002
20:30

Spain	1 – 1 (a.e.t.)	Republic of Ireland
Morientes 8'	(Report)	Robbie Keane 90' (pen.)
Penalties
Hierro (penalty scored); Baraja (penalty scored); Juanfran (penalty missed); Valerón (penalty missed); Mendieta (penalty scored)	3–2	(penalty scored) Robbie Keane; (penalty missed) Holland; (penalty missed) Connolly; (penalty missed) Kilbane; (penalty scored) Finnan

Suwon World Cup Stadium, Suwon
Attendance: 38,926
Referee: Anders Frisk (Sweden)

== Record players ==
Defender Steve Staunton has represented the Irish team in all of their thirteen World Cup matches, captaining the side in 2002.

Rank	Player	Matches	Tournaments
1	Steve Staunton	13	1990, 1994, 2002
2	Pat Bonner	9	1990, 1994
2	Ray Houghton	9	1990, 1994
2	Paul McGrath	9	1990, 1994
2	Andy Townsend	9	1990, 1994
6	John Aldridge	8	1990, 1994
7	Niall Quinn	7	1990, 2002
8	Tony Cascarino	6	1990, 1994
8	Gary Kelly	6	1994, 2002
8	Jason McAteer	6	1994, 2002

== Goalscorers ==
On June 11th 1990, Kevin Sheedy made history by scoring Ireland's first-ever FIFA World Cup goal. He did it on their opening match against England in Cagliari.

Rank	Player	Goals	Tournaments
1	Robbie Keane	3	2002
2	Kevin Sheedy	1	1990
2	Niall Quinn	1	1990
2	John Aldridge	1	1994
2	Ray Houghton	1	1994
2	Gary Breen	1	2002
2	Damien Duff	1	2002
2	Matt Holland	1	2002

== See also ==
- Republic of Ireland at the UEFA European Championship
- Republic of Ireland at the UEFA Nations League
