= UEFA Euro 2016 Group E =

Football tournament group stage

Group E of UEFA Euro 2016 contained Belgium, Italy, Republic of Ireland and Sweden. Italy was the only former European champion in this group, having won in 1968. Matches were played from 13 to 22 June 2016.

== Teams ==
Draw position	Team	Pot	Method of qualification	Date of qualification	Finals appearance	Last appearance	Previous best performance	UEFA Rankings October 2015 (Note: The UEFA rankings of October 2015 were used for seeding for the final draw.)	FIFA Rankings June 2016
E1	Belgium	1	Group B winner	10 October 2015	5th	2000	Runners-up (1980)	5	2
E2	Italy	2	Group H winner	10 October 2015	9th	2012	Winners (1968)	6	12
E3	Republic of Ireland	4	Play-off winner	16 November 2015	3rd	2012	Group stage (1988, 2012)	23	33
E4	Sweden	3	Play-off winner	17 November 2015	6th	2012	Semi-finals (1992)	16	35

== Standings ==
Pos	Team	Pld	W	D	L	GF	GA	GD	Pts	Qualification
1	Italy	3	2	0	1	3	1	+2	6 (Note: Head-to-head result: Belgium 0–2 Italy.)	Advance to knockout stage
2	Belgium	3	2	0	1	4	2	+2	6	Advance to knockout stage
3	Republic of Ireland	3	1	1	1	2	4	−2	4	Advance to knockout stage
4	Sweden	3	0	1	2	1	3	−2	1	

Source: UEFA
Rules for classification: Group stage tiebreakers
Notes:

In the round of 16,

- The winner of Group E, Italy, advanced to play the runner-up of Group D, Spain.
- The runner-up of Group E, Belgium, advanced to play the winner of Group F, Hungary.
- The third-placed team of Group E, Republic of Ireland, advanced as one of the four best third-placed teams to play the winner of Group A, France.

== Matches ==
=== Republic of Ireland vs Sweden ===
13 June 2016
18:00

Republic of Ireland	1–1	Sweden
Hoolahan 48'	Report	Clark 71' (o.g.)

Stade de France, Saint-Denis
Attendance: 73,419
Referee: Milorad Mažić (Serbia)

Republic of Ireland	Sweden

GK	23	Darren Randolph
RB	2	Séamus Coleman
CB	4	John O'Shea (c)
CB	3	Ciaran Clark
LB	19	Robbie Brady
CM	8	James McCarthy	(yellow card) 43'	(substituted off) 85'
CM	6	Glenn Whelan	(yellow card) 77'
CM	13	Jeff Hendrick
AM	20	Wes Hoolahan		(substituted off) 78'
CF	14	Jonathan Walters		(substituted off) 64'
CF	9	Shane Long
Substitutions:
MF	11	James McClean		(substituted on) 64'
FW	10	Robbie Keane		(substituted on) 78'
MF	7	Aiden McGeady		(substituted on) 85'
Manager:
(Northern Ireland) Martin O'Neill

GK	1	Andreas Isaksson
RB	2	Mikael Lustig		(substituted off) 45'
CB	14	Victor Lindelöf	(yellow card) 61'
CB	4	Andreas Granqvist
LB	5	Martin Olsson
RM	7	Sebastian Larsson
CM	18	Oscar Lewicki		(substituted off) 86'
CM	9	Kim Källström
LM	6	Emil Forsberg
CF	11	Marcus Berg		(substituted off) 59'
CF	10	Zlatan Ibrahimović (c)
Substitutions:
DF	3	Erik Johansson		(substituted on) 45'
FW	20	John Guidetti		(substituted on) 59'
MF	8	Albin Ekdal		(substituted on) 86'
Manager:
Erik Hamrén

Man of the Match:
Wes Hoolahan (Republic of Ireland)

Assistant referees:
Milovan Ristić (Serbia)
Dalibor Đurđević (Serbia)
Fourth official:
Matej Jug (Slovenia)
Additional assistant referees:
Danilo Grujić (Serbia)
Nenad Đokić (Serbia)
Reserve assistant referee:
Jure Praprotnik (Slovenia)

=== Belgium vs Italy ===
13 June 2016
21:00

Belgium	0–2	Italy
	Report	Giaccherini 32'; Pellè 90+3'

Parc Olympique Lyonnais, Décines-Charpieu
Attendance: 55,408
Referee: Mark Clattenburg (England)

Belgium	Italy

GK	1	Thibaut Courtois
RB	23	Laurent Ciman		(substituted off) 76'
CB	2	Toby Alderweireld
CB	3	Thomas Vermaelen
LB	5	Jan Vertonghen	(yellow card) 90+2'
CM	4	Radja Nainggolan		(substituted off) 62'
CM	6	Axel Witsel
RW	7	Kevin De Bruyne
AM	8	Marouane Fellaini
LW	10	Eden Hazard (c)
CF	9	Romelu Lukaku		(substituted off) 73'
Substitutions:
FW	14	Dries Mertens		(substituted on) 62'
FW	17	Divock Origi		(substituted on) 73'
FW	11	Yannick Carrasco		(substituted on) 76'
Manager:
Marc Wilmots

GK	1	Gianluigi Buffon (c)
CB	15	Andrea Barzagli
CB	19	Leonardo Bonucci	(yellow card) 78'
CB	3	Giorgio Chiellini	(yellow card) 65'
DM	16	Daniele De Rossi		(substituted off) 78'
RW	6	Antonio Candreva
CM	18	Marco Parolo
CM	23	Emanuele Giaccherini
LW	4	Matteo Darmian		(substituted off) 58'
CF	9	Graziano Pellè
CF	17	Éder	(yellow card) 75'	(substituted off) 75'
Substitutions:
DF	2	Mattia De Sciglio		(substituted on) 58'
FW	11	Ciro Immobile		(substituted on) 75'
MF	10	Thiago Motta	(yellow card) 84'	(substituted on) 78'
Manager:
Antonio Conte

Man of the Match:
Emanuele Giaccherini (Italy)

Assistant referees:
Simon Beck (England)
Jake Collin (England)
Fourth official:
Carlos del Cerro Grande (Spain)
Additional assistant referees:
Anthony Taylor (England)
Andre Marriner (England)
Reserve assistant referee:
Juan Carlos Yuste Jiménez (Spain)

=== Italy vs Sweden ===
17 June 2016
15:00

Italy	1–0	Sweden
Éder 88'	Report

Stadium Municipal, Toulouse
Attendance: 29,600
Referee: Viktor Kassai (Hungary)

Italy	Sweden

GK	1	Gianluigi Buffon (c)	(yellow card) 90+3'
CB	15	Andrea Barzagli
CB	19	Leonardo Bonucci
CB	3	Giorgio Chiellini
RW	8	Alessandro Florenzi		(substituted off) 85'
CM	18	Marco Parolo
CM	16	Daniele De Rossi	(yellow card) 69'	(substituted off) 74'
CM	23	Emanuele Giaccherini
LW	6	Antonio Candreva
CF	9	Graziano Pellè		(substituted off) 60'
CF	17	Éder
Substitutions:
FW	7	Simone Zaza		(substituted on) 60'
MF	10	Thiago Motta		(substituted on) 74'
MF	14	Stefano Sturaro		(substituted on) 85'
Manager:
Antonio Conte

GK	1	Andreas Isaksson
RB	14	Victor Lindelöf
CB	3	Erik Johansson
CB	4	Andreas Granqvist
LB	5	Martin Olsson	(yellow card) 90'
RM	7	Sebastian Larsson
CM	8	Albin Ekdal		(substituted off) 79'
CM	9	Kim Källström
LM	6	Emil Forsberg		(substituted off) 79'
CF	20	John Guidetti		(substituted off) 85'
CF	10	Zlatan Ibrahimović (c)
Substitutions:
MF	21	Jimmy Durmaz		(substituted on) 79'
MF	18	Oscar Lewicki		(substituted on) 79'
FW	11	Marcus Berg		(substituted on) 85'
Manager:
Erik Hamrén

Man of the Match:
Éder (Italy)

Assistant referees:
György Ring (Hungary)
Vencel Tóth (Hungary)
Fourth official:
Clément Turpin (France)
Additional assistant referees:
Tamás Bognár (Hungary)
Ádám Farkas (Hungary)
Reserve assistant referee:
Nicolas Danos (France)

=== Belgium vs Republic of Ireland ===
18 June 2016
15:00

Belgium	3–0	Republic of Ireland
R. Lukaku 48', 70'; Witsel 61'	Report

Stade de Bordeaux, Bordeaux
Attendance: 39,493
Referee: Cüneyt Çakır (Turkey)

Belgium	Republic of Ireland

GK	1	Thibaut Courtois
RB	16	Thomas Meunier
CB	2	Toby Alderweireld
CB	3	Thomas Vermaelen	(yellow card) 49'
LB	5	Jan Vertonghen
CM	6	Axel Witsel
CM	19	Moussa Dembélé		(substituted off) 57'
RW	11	Yannick Carrasco		(substituted off) 64'
AM	7	Kevin De Bruyne
LW	10	Eden Hazard (c)
CF	9	Romelu Lukaku		(substituted off) 83'
Substitutions:
MF	4	Radja Nainggolan		(substituted on) 57'
FW	14	Dries Mertens		(substituted on) 64'
FW	20	Christian Benteke		(substituted on) 83'
Manager:
Marc Wilmots

GK	23	Darren Randolph
RB	2	Séamus Coleman
CB	4	John O'Shea (c)
CB	3	Ciaran Clark
LB	17	Stephen Ward
RM	13	Jeff Hendrick	(yellow card) 42'
CM	6	Glenn Whelan
CM	8	James McCarthy		(substituted off) 62'
LM	19	Robbie Brady
SS	20	Wes Hoolahan		(substituted off) 71'
CF	9	Shane Long		(substituted off) 79'
Substitutions:
MF	11	James McClean		(substituted on) 62'
MF	7	Aiden McGeady		(substituted on) 71'
FW	10	Robbie Keane		(substituted on) 79'
Manager:
(Northern Ireland) Martin O'Neill

Man of the Match:
Axel Witsel (Belgium)

Assistant referees:
Bahattin Duran (Turkey)
Tarık Ongun (Turkey)
Fourth official:
Benoît Bastien (France)
Additional assistant referees:
Hüseyin Göçek (Turkey)
Barış Şimşek (Turkey)
Reserve assistant referee:
Frédéric Cano (France)

=== Italy vs Republic of Ireland ===
22 June 2016
21:00

Italy	0–1	Republic of Ireland
	Report	Brady 85'

Stade Pierre-Mauroy, Villeneuve-d'Ascq
Attendance: 44,268
Referee: Ovidiu Hațegan (Romania)

Italy	Republic of Ireland

GK	12	Salvatore Sirigu	(yellow card) 39'
CB	15	Andrea Barzagli	(yellow card) 78'
CB	19	Leonardo Bonucci (c)
CB	5	Angelo Ogbonna
DM	10	Thiago Motta
RW	21	Federico Bernardeschi		(substituted off) 60'
CM	14	Stefano Sturaro
CM	8	Alessandro Florenzi
LW	2	Mattia De Sciglio		(substituted off) 81'
CF	7	Simone Zaza	(yellow card) 87'
CF	11	Ciro Immobile		(substituted off) 74'
Substitutions:
DF	4	Matteo Darmian		(substituted on) 60'
FW	20	Lorenzo Insigne	(yellow card) 90+1'	(substituted on) 74'
MF	22	Stephan El Shaarawy		(substituted on) 81'
Manager:
Antonio Conte

GK	23	Darren Randolph
RB	2	Séamus Coleman (c)
CB	12	Shane Duffy
CB	5	Richard Keogh
LB	17	Stephen Ward	(yellow card) 73'
RM	13	Jeff Hendrick
CM	11	James McClean
CM	8	James McCarthy		(substituted off) 77'
LM	19	Robbie Brady
SS	21	Daryl Murphy		(substituted off) 70'
CF	9	Shane Long	(yellow card) 39'	(substituted off) 90'
Substitutions:
MF	7	Aiden McGeady		(substituted on) 70'
MF	20	Wes Hoolahan		(substituted on) 77'
MF	22	Stephen Quinn		(substituted on) 90'
Manager:
(Northern Ireland) Martin O'Neill

Man of the Match:
Robbie Brady (Republic of Ireland)

Assistant referees:
Octavian Șovre (Romania)
Sebastian Gheorghe (Romania)
Fourth official:
Anastasios Sidiropoulos (Greece)
Additional assistant referees:
Alexandru Tudor (Romania)
Sebastian Colţescu (Romania)
Reserve assistant referee:
Damianos Efthymiadis (Greece)

=== Sweden vs Belgium ===
22 June 2016
21:00

Sweden	0–1	Belgium
	Report	Nainggolan 84'

Stade de Nice, Nice
Attendance: 34,011
Referee: Felix Brych (Germany)

Sweden	Belgium

GK	1	Andreas Isaksson
RB	14	Victor Lindelöf
CB	3	Erik Johansson	(yellow card) 36'
CB	4	Andreas Granqvist
LB	5	Martin Olsson
RM	7	Sebastian Larsson		(substituted off) 70'
CM	8	Albin Ekdal	(yellow card) 33'
CM	9	Kim Källström
LM	6	Emil Forsberg		(substituted off) 82'
CF	11	Marcus Berg		(substituted off) 63'
CF	10	Zlatan Ibrahimović (c)
Substitutions:
FW	20	John Guidetti		(substituted on) 63'
MF	21	Jimmy Durmaz		(substituted on) 70'
MF	22	Erkan Zengin		(substituted on) 82'
Manager:
Erik Hamrén

GK	1	Thibaut Courtois
RB	16	Thomas Meunier	(yellow card) 30'
CB	2	Toby Alderweireld
CB	3	Thomas Vermaelen
LB	5	Jan Vertonghen
CM	4	Radja Nainggolan
CM	6	Axel Witsel	(yellow card) 45+1'
RW	11	Yannick Carrasco		(substituted off) 71'
AM	7	Kevin De Bruyne
LW	10	Eden Hazard (c)		(substituted off) 90+3'
CF	9	Romelu Lukaku		(substituted off) 87'
Substitutions:
FW	14	Dries Mertens		(substituted on) 71'
FW	20	Christian Benteke		(substituted on) 87'
FW	17	Divock Origi		(substituted on) 90+3'
Manager:
Marc Wilmots

Man of the Match:
Eden Hazard (Belgium)

Assistant referees:
Mark Borsch (Germany)
Stefan Lupp (Germany)
Fourth official:
Matej Jug (Slovenia)
Additional assistant referees:
Bastian Dankert (Germany)
Marco Fritz (Germany)
Reserve assistant referee:
Jure Praprotnik (Slovenia)

== See also ==
- Belgium at the UEFA European Championship
- Italy at the UEFA European Championship
- Republic of Ireland at the UEFA European Championship
- Sweden at the UEFA European Championship
