= Republic of Ireland in the UEFA Nations League =

UEFA Nations League

The UEFA Nations League is a biennial international football competition contested by the senior men's national teams of the member associations of UEFA, the sport's European governing body. The first season has begun in September 2018 consisting of four groups in each of the four leagues ranked by UEFA coefficient of each country.

The Republic of Ireland has been in Division B, since the beginning of this tournament.

== UEFA Nations League record ==
[[UEFA Nations League|UEFA Nations League]] record
Season	League	Group	Round	Pos	Pld	W	D	L	GF	GA	P/R	RK
2018–19	B	4	Group stage	3rd	4	0	2	2	1	5	Same position	23rd
2020–21	B	4	Group stage	3rd	6	0	3	3	1	4	Same position	28th
2022–23	B	1	Group stage	3rd	6	2	1	3	8	7	Same position	26th
2024–25	B	2	Group stage	3rd	6	2	0	4	3	12	Same position	27th
2024–25	B	Relegation playoff		Winners	2	2	0	0	4	2	Same position	27th
2026–27	B	3	Group stage	2nd	6	2	2	2	9	5	▲ or	20th–24th
2026–27	B	Promotion playoff		TBD							▲ or	20th–24th
2028–29	A or B	TBD	League phase	TBD								
Totals					30	8	8	14	26	35	26th (average rank)	

== 2018–19 UEFA Nations League ==
=== League B Group 4 ===
Pos	Team	Pld	W	D	L	GF	GA	GD	Pts	Promotion (Note: Due to revamp of the format for the 2020–21 UEFA Nations League, no teams were eventually relegated.)	(Denmark)	(Wales)	(Republic of Ireland)
1	Denmark (P)	4	2	2	0	4	1	+3	8	Promotion to League A	—	2–0	0–0
2	Wales	4	2	0	2	6	5	+1	6		1–2	—	4–1
3	Republic of Ireland	4	0	2	2	1	5	−4	2		0–0	0–1	—

Source: UEFA
Rules for classification: Tiebreakers
(P) Promoted
Notes:
6 September 2018
20:45 (19:45 UTC+1)

Wales	4–1	Republic of Ireland
Lawrence 6'; Bale 18'; Ramsey 37'; C. Roberts 55'	Report	S. Williams 66'

Cardiff City Stadium, Cardiff
Attendance: 25,657
Referee: Clément Turpin (France)

13 October 2018
20:45 (19:45 UTC+1)

Republic of Ireland	0–0	Denmark
	Report

Aviva Stadium, Dublin
Attendance: 41,220
Referee: Xavier Estrada Fernández (Spain)

16 October 2018
20:45 (19:45 UTC+1)

Republic of Ireland	0–1	Wales
	Report	Wilson 58'

Aviva Stadium, Dublin
Attendance: 38,321
Referee: Björn Kuipers (Netherlands)

19 November 2018
20:45

Denmark	0–0	Republic of Ireland
	Report

Aarhus Stadium, Aarhus
Attendance: 11,130
Referee: Aliyar Aghayev (Azerbaijan)

== 2020–21 UEFA Nations League ==
=== League B Group 4 ===
Pos	Team	Pld	W	D	L	GF	GA	GD	Pts	Promotion or relegation	(Wales)	(Finland)	(Republic of Ireland)	(Bulgaria)
1	Wales (P)	6	5	1	0	7	1	+6	16	Promotion to League A	—	3–1	1–0	1–0
2	Finland	6	4	0	2	7	5	+2	12		0–1	—	1–0	2–0
3	Republic of Ireland	6	0	3	3	1	4	−3	3		0–0	0–1	—	0–0
4	Bulgaria (R)	6	0	2	4	2	7	−5	2	Relegation to League C	0–1	1–2	1–1	—

Source: UEFA
Rules for classification: Tiebreakers
(P) Promoted; (R) Relegated
3 September 2020
20:45 (21:45 UTC+3)

Bulgaria	1–1	Republic of Ireland
Kraev 56'	Report	Duffy 90+3'

Vasil Levski National Stadium, Sofia
Attendance: 0
Referee: Manuel Schüttengruber (Austria)
6 September 2020
18:00 (17:00 UTC+1)

Republic of Ireland	0–1	Finland
	Report	Jensen 64'

Aviva Stadium, Dublin
Attendance: 0
Referee: Fabio Maresca (Italy)
11 October 2020
15:00 (14:00 UTC+1)

Republic of Ireland	0–0	Wales
	Report

Aviva Stadium, Dublin
Attendance: 0
Referee: Anastasios Sidiropoulos (Greece)
14 October 2020
18:00 (19:00 UTC+3)

Finland	1–0	Republic of Ireland
Jensen 66'	Report

Olympic Stadium, Helsinki
Attendance: 7,900
Referee: Lionel Tschudi (Switzerland)
15 November 2020
18:00 (17:00 UTC±0)

Wales	1–0	Republic of Ireland
Brooks 67'	Report

Cardiff City Stadium, Cardiff
Attendance: 0
Referee: Petr Ardeleánu (Czech Republic)
18 November 2020
20:45 (19:45 UTC±0)

Republic of Ireland	0–0	Bulgaria
	Report

Aviva Stadium, Dublin
Attendance: 0
Referee: Lawrence Visser (Belgium)

== 2022–23 UEFA Nations League ==
=== League B Group 1 ===
Pos	Team	Pld	W	D	L	GF	GA	GD	Pts	Promotion or relegation	(Scotland)	(Ukraine)	(Republic of Ireland)	(Armenia)
1	Scotland (P)	6	4	1	1	11	5	+6	13	Promotion to League A	—	3–0	2–1	2–0
2	Ukraine	6	3	2	1	10	4	+6	11		0–0	—	1–1	3–0
3	Republic of Ireland	6	2	1	3	8	7	+1	7		3–0	0–1	—	3–2
4	Armenia (R)	6	1	0	5	4	17	−13	3	Relegation to League C	1–4	0–5	1–0	—

Source: UEFA
Rules for classification: Tiebreakers
(P) Promoted; (R) Relegated
4 June 2022
15:00 (17:00 UTC+4)

Armenia	1–0	Republic of Ireland
Spertsyan 74'	Report

Vazgen Sargsyan Republican Stadium, Yerevan
Attendance: 10,600
Referee: Radu Petrescu (Romania)
8 June 2022
20:45 (19:45 UTC+1)

Republic of Ireland	0–1	Ukraine
	Report	Tsyhankov 49'

Aviva Stadium, Dublin
Attendance: 40,111
Referee: Filip Glova (Slovakia)
11 June 2022
18:00 (17:00 UTC+1)

Republic of Ireland	3–0	Scotland
Browne 20'; Parrott 28'; Obafemi 51'	Report

Aviva Stadium, Dublin
Attendance: 46,927
Referee: Marco Di Bello (Italy)
14 June 2022
20:45

Ukraine	1–1	Republic of Ireland
Dovbyk 47'	Report	Collins 31'

Stadion Miejski ŁKS, Łódź (Poland)
Attendance: 10,641
Referee: Ali Palabıyık (Turkey)
24 September 2022
20:45 (19:45 UTC+1)

Scotland	2–1	Republic of Ireland
Hendry 50'; Christie 82' (pen.)	Report	Egan 18'

Hampden Park, Glasgow
Attendance: 48,853
Referee: Sandro Schärer (Switzerland)
27 September 2022
20:45 (19:45 UTC+1)

Republic of Ireland	3–2	Armenia
Egan 18'; Obafemi 52'; Brady 90+1' (pen.)	Report	Dashyan 71'; Spertsyan 73'

Aviva Stadium, Dublin
Attendance: 41,719
Referee: Rade Obrenovič (Slovenia)

== 2024–25 UEFA Nations League ==
=== League B Group 2 ===
Pos	Team	Pld	W	D	L	GF	GA	GD	Pts	Promotion, qualification or relegation	(England)	(Greece)	(Republic of Ireland)	(Finland)
1	England (P)	6	5	0	1	16	3	+13	15 (Note: Tied on head-to-head points. Head-to-head goal difference: England +2, Greece −2.)	Promotion to League A	—	1–2	5–0	2–0
2	Greece (O, P)	6	5	0	1	11	4	+7	15	Qualification for promotion play-offs	0–3	—	2–0	3–0
3	Republic of Ireland (O)	6	2	0	4	3	12	−9	6	Qualification for relegation play-offs	0–2	0–2	—	1–0
4	Finland (R)	6	0	0	6	2	13	−11	0	Relegation to League C	1–3	0–2	1–2	—

Source: UEFA
Rules for classification: Tiebreakers
(O) Play-off winners; (P) Promoted; (R) Relegated
Notes:
7 September 2024
18:00 (17:00 UTC+1)

Republic of Ireland	0–2	England
	Report	Rice 11'; Grealish 26'

Aviva Stadium, Dublin
Attendance: 55,359
Referee: José María Sánchez Martínez (Spain)
10 September 2024
20:45 (19:45 UTC+1)

Republic of Ireland	0–2	Greece
	Report	Ioannidis 50'; Tzolis 87'

Aviva Stadium, Dublin
Attendance: 37,274
Referee: Espen Eskås (Norway)
10 October 2024
20:45 (21:45 UTC+3)

Finland	1–2	Republic of Ireland
Pohjanpalo 17'	Report	Scales 57'; Brady 88'

Helsinki Olympic Stadium, Helsinki
Attendance: 16,105
Referee: Aleksandar Stavrev (North Macedonia)
13 October 2024
20:45 (21:45 UTC+3)

Greece	2–0	Republic of Ireland
Bakasetas 48'; Mantalos 90+1'	Report

Karaiskakis Stadium, Piraeus
Attendance: 30,253
Referee: Joey Kooij (Netherlands)
14 November 2024
20:45 (19:45 UTC±0)

Republic of Ireland	1–0	Finland
Ferguson 45'	Report

Aviva Stadium, Dublin
Attendance: 39,163
Referee: Harm Osmers (Germany)
17 November 2024
18:00 (17:00 UTC±0)

England	5–0	Republic of Ireland
Kane 53' (pen.); Gordon 56'; Gallagher 58'; Bowen 76'; Harwood-Bellis 79'	Report

Wembley Stadium, London
Attendance: 79,969
Referee: Erik Lambrechts (Belgium)

=== League B/C promotion/relegation play-offs ===
First leg

20 March 2025
20:45 (21:45 UTC+2)

Bulgaria	1–2	Republic of Ireland
M. Petkov 6'	Report	Azaz 21'; Doherty 42'

Stadion Hristo Botev, Plovdiv
Attendance: 7,835
Referee: Benoît Bastien (France)

Second leg

23 March 2025
20:45 (19:45 UTC±0)

Republic of Ireland	2–1	Bulgaria
Ferguson 63'; Idah 84'	Report	Antov 30'

Aviva Stadium, Dublin
Attendance: 40,156
Referee: Halil Umut Meler (Turkey)

Republic of Ireland won 4–2 on aggregate, and therefore both teams remained in their respective leagues.

== 2026–27 UEFA Nations League ==
=== League B Group 3 ===
Pos	Team	Pld	W	D	L	GF	GA	GD	Pts	Promotion or qualification	(Austria)	(Republic of Ireland)	(Kosovo)	(Israel)
1	Austria (P)	6	3	3	0	11	6	+5	12	Promotion to League A	—	1–0	3–1	3–1
2	Republic of Ireland	6	2	2	2	9	5	+4	8	Qualification for promotion play-offs	2–2	—	3–0	1–1
3	Kosovo	6	1	3	2	3	7	−4	6		1–1	1–0	—	0–0
4	Israel	6	0	4	2	3	8	−5	4	Qualification for relegation play-offs	1–1	0–3	0–0	—

Source: UEFA
Rules for classification: Tiebreakers
(P) Promoted
24 September 2026
20:45

Kosovo	1–0	Republic of Ireland
Muriqi 83'	Report

Fadil Vokrri Stadium, Pristina
Attendance: 12,627
Referee: Lawrence Visser (Belgium)
27 September 2026
20:45

Israel	0–3	Republic of Ireland
	Report	Parrott 13'; Idah 16'; Moylan 25'

Nagyerdei Stadion, Debrecen (Hungary) (Note: Due to the Middle Eastern crisis, Israel were required to play their home matches at neutral venues.)
Attendance: 319
Referee: Harm Osmers (Germany)
1 October 2026
20:45 (19:45 UTC+1)

Republic of Ireland	2–2	Austria
Parrott 12', 45' (pen.)	Report	Prass 71'; Gregoritsch 77'

Aviva Stadium, Dublin
Referee: Allard Lindhout (Netherlands)
4 October 2026
20:45

Republic of Ireland	1–1	Israel
Parrott 39' (pen.)	Report	D. Peretz 47'

TSC Arena, Bačka Topola (Serbia) (Note: Following a request from the Football Association of Ireland, the Republic of Ireland v Israel match was played at a neutral venue and behind closed doors due to safety concerns.)
Attendance: 0
Referee: Juan Martínez Munuera (Spain)
14 November 2026
20:45

Austria	1–0	Republic of Ireland
Kalajdžić 79'	Report

Raiffeisen Arena, Linz
Attendance: 16,700
Referee: Irfan Peljto (Bosnia and Herzegovina)
17 November 2026
20:45 (19:45 UTC±0)

Republic of Ireland	3–0	Kosovo
Parrott 28' (pen.), 50' (pen.); Moylan 75'	Report

Aviva Stadium, Dublin
Attendance: 50,381
Referee: Edgars Maļcevs (Latvia)

=== Promotion play-off ===
==== First leg ====
27 March 2027
19:45

Republic of Ireland	v	Croatia
	Report

Aviva Stadium, Dublin, Ireland

==== Second leg ====
30 March 2027
20:45 (19:45 UTC±0)

Croatia	v	Republic of Ireland
	Report

, Croatia

== See also ==
- Republic of Ireland at the FIFA World Cup
- Republic of Ireland at the UEFA European Championship
