= UEFA Euro 2016 =

15th edition of the association football championship

Championnat d'Europe de football 2016 (in French)
- Le Rendez-Vous

Tournament details
- Host country: France
- Dates: 10 June – 10 July
- Teams: 24
- Venues: 10 (in 9 host cities)

Final positions
- Champions: Portugal (1st title)
- Runners-up: France
- Third place: Wales; Germany

Tournament statistics
- Matches played: 51
- Goals scored: 108 (2.12 per match)
- Attendance: 2,427,303 (47,594 per match)
- Top scorer: (France) Antoine Griezmann (6 goals)
- Best player: (France) Antoine Griezmann
- Best young player: (Portugal) Renato Sanches

The 2016 UEFA European Football Championship, commonly referred to as UEFA Euro 2016 or simply Euro 2016, was the 15th UEFA European Championship, the quadrennial international men's football championship of Europe organised by UEFA. It was held in France from 10 June to 10 July 2016. Spain were the two-time defending champions, having won the 2008 and 2012 tournaments, but were eliminated in the round of 16 by Italy. Portugal won the tournament for the first time, following a 1–0 victory after extra time over the host team, France, in the final played at the Stade de France.

For the first time, the European Championship final tournament was contested by 24 teams, having been expanded from the 16-team format used since 1996. Under the new format, the finalists contested a group stage consisting of six groups of four teams, followed by a knockout stage including three rounds and the final. Nineteen teams – the top two from each of the nine qualifying groups and the best third-placed team – joined France in the final tournament, who qualified automatically as host; a series of two-legged play-off ties between the remaining third-placed teams in November 2015 decided the last four finalist spots.

France was chosen as the host nation on 28 May 2010, after a bidding process in which they beat Italy and Turkey for the right to host the 2016 finals. The matches were played in ten stadiums in ten cities: Bordeaux, Lens, Villeneuve-d'Ascq, Décines-Charpieu, Marseille, Nice, Paris, Saint-Denis, Saint-Étienne, and Toulouse. It was the third time that France hosted the finals, after the inaugural tournament in 1960 and the 1984 finals.

As the winners, Portugal earned the right to compete at the 2017 FIFA Confederations Cup in Russia.

== Bid process ==
Four bids came before the deadline on 9 March 2009. France, Italy and Turkey put in single bids while Norway and Sweden put in a joint bid. Norway and Sweden eventually withdrew their bid in December 2009.

The host was selected on 28 May 2010.

Voting results
Country	Round	
Country	1st (points)	2nd (votes)
France	43	7
Turkey	38	6
Italy	23	–
Total	104	13

- Round 1: Each of the thirteen members of the UEFA Executive Committee ranked the 3 bids first, second, and third. First place ranking received 5 points, second place 2 points, and third place 1 point. Executive members from the countries bidding were not allowed to vote.
- Round 2: The same thirteen-member committee voted for either of the two finalists.

== Qualification ==
Team qualified for UEFA Euro 2016 Team failed to qualify

The qualifying draw took place at the Palais des Congrès Acropolis in Nice, on 23 February 2014, with the first matches being played in September 2014.

53 teams competed for 23 places in the final tournament to join France, who automatically qualified as hosts. Gibraltar competed in a European Championship qualifying for the first time since their affiliation to UEFA in 2013. The seeding pots were formed on the basis of the UEFA national team coefficients, with the Euro 2012 champions Spain and hosts France automatically top seeded.

The 53 national sides were drawn into eight groups of six teams and one group of five teams. The group winners, runners-up, and the best third-placed team (with the results against the sixth-placed team discarded) qualify directly for the final tournament. The remaining eight third-placed teams contested two-legged play-offs to determine the last four qualifiers.

In March 2012, Gianni Infantino, the UEFA general secretary at the time, stated that UEFA would review the qualification competition to ensure that it was not "boring". In September 2011, during UEFA's first full strategy meeting, Michel Platini proposed a qualification format involving two group stages, but the member associations did not accept the proposal. In May 2013, Platini confirmed a similar qualifying format would be again discussed during the September 2013 UEFA executive committee meeting in Dubrovnik.

=== Qualified teams ===
Thirteen of the sixteen teams (including hosts France) that qualified for Euro 2012 qualified again for the 2016 final tournament. Among them were England, who became only the sixth team to record a flawless qualifying campaign (10 wins in 10 matches), defending European champions Spain, and world champions Germany, who qualified for their 12th straight European Championship finals.

Romania, Turkey, Austria, and Switzerland all returned after missing out in 2012, with the Austrians qualifying for just their second final Euro tournament, after having co-hosted Euro 2008 and first time through qualifying. Returning to the final tournament after long absences were Belgium for the first time since co-hosting Euro 2000, and Hungary for the first time in 44 years, having last appeared at Euro 1972, and 30 years since appearing in a major tournament, their previous one being the 1986 FIFA World Cup.

Four teams secured their first qualification to a UEFA European Championship final tournament: Albania, Iceland, Northern Ireland, and Wales. Northern Ireland and Wales had each previously competed in the FIFA World Cup, while Albania and Iceland had never participated in a major tournament. Slovakia meanwhile are making the first tournament as an independent nation, having qualified for three Euro tournaments and eight World Cups under Czechoslovakia. Similarly, both Austria and Ukraine completed successful qualification campaigns for the first time, having only previously qualified as hosts (of 2008 and 2012 respectively).

Scotland were the only team from the British Isles not to qualify for the finals, and it also marked the first time that both Northern Ireland and the Republic of Ireland qualified for the same major tournament finals. Greece, champions in 2004, finished bottom in their group and failed to qualify for the first time since 2000. Two other previous champions, the Netherlands (1988) and Denmark (1992), missed out on the finals. The Dutch team failed to qualify for the first time since Euro 1984 (also held in France), missing out on their first major tournament since the 2002 FIFA World Cup and only 16 months after having finished third at the 2014 FIFA World Cup. Denmark did not appear at the Euro finals for the first time since 2008, after losing in the play-off round against Sweden.

As of 2024, this was the last time that Northern Ireland and the Republic of Ireland qualified for either the World Cup or European Championship finals, the only time that Iceland qualified, as well as the last time that Denmark, the Netherlands and Scotland failed to qualify.

Team	Qualified as	Qualified on	Previous appearances in tournament (Note: Bold indicates champion for that year. Italic indicates host for that year.)
France	Host	28 May 2010	8 (1960, **1984**, 1992, 1996, **2000**, 2004, 2008, 2012)
England	Group E winner	5 September 2015	8 (1968, 1980, 1988, 1992, 1996, 2000, 2004, 2012)
Czech Republic (Note: From 1960 to 1980, both the Czech Republic and Slovakia competed as Czechoslovakia.)	Group A winner	6 September 2015	8 (1960, **1976**, 1980, 1996, 2000, 2004, 2008, 2012)
Iceland	Group A runner-up	6 September 2015	0 (debut)
Austria	Group G winner	8 September 2015	1 (2008)
Northern Ireland	Group F winner	8 October 2015	0 (debut)
Portugal	Group I winner	8 October 2015	6 (1984, 1996, 2000, 2004, 2008, 2012)
Spain	Group C winner	9 October 2015	9 (**1964**, 1980, 1984, 1988, 1996, 2000, 2004, **2008**, **2012**)
Switzerland	Group E runner-up	9 October 2015	3 (1996, 2004, 2008)
Italy	Group H winner	10 October 2015	8 (**1968**, 1980, 1988, 1996, 2000, 2004, 2008, 2012)
Belgium	Group B winner	10 October 2015	4 (1972, 1980, 1984, 2000)
Wales	Group B runner-up	10 October 2015	0 (debut)
Romania	Group F runner-up	11 October 2015	4 (1984, 1996, 2000, 2008)
Albania	Group I runner-up	11 October 2015	0 (debut)
Germany (Note: From 1972 to 1988, Germany competed as West Germany.)	Group D winner	11 October 2015	11 (**1972**, 1976, **1980**, 1984, 1988, 1992, **1996**, 2000, 2004, 2008, 2012)
Poland	Group D runner-up	11 October 2015	2 (2008, 2012)
Russia (Note: From 1960 to 1988, Russia competed as the Soviet Union, and in 1992 as CIS.)	Group G runner-up	12 October 2015	10 (**1960**, 1964, 1968, 1972, 1988, 1992, 1996, 2004, 2008, 2012)
Slovakia	Group C runner-up	12 October 2015	3 (1960, **1976**, 1980)
Croatia	Group H runner-up	13 October 2015	4 (1996, 2004, 2008, 2012)
Turkey	Best third-placed team	13 October 2015	3 (1996, 2000, 2008)
Hungary	Play-off winner	15 November 2015	2 (1964, 1972)
Republic of Ireland	Play-off winner	16 November 2015	2 (1988, 2012)
Sweden	Play-off winner	17 November 2015	5 (1992, 2000, 2004, 2008, 2012)
Ukraine	Play-off winner	17 November 2015	1 (2012)

=== Final draw ===
The draw for the finals took place at the Palais des Congrès de la Porte Maillot in Paris on 12 December 2015, 18:00 CET. The 24 qualified teams were drawn into six groups of four teams, with the hosts France being automatically placed in position A1. The remaining teams were seeded into four pots of five (Pot 1) or six teams (Pots 2, 3, and 4). As the title holders, Spain were seeded in Pot 1, while the other 22 teams were seeded according to the UEFA national team coefficients updated after the completion of the qualifying group stage (excluding the play-offs), which were released by UEFA on 14 October 2015.

Pot 1 (Note: Hosts France (coefficient 33,599; rank 8th) belonged to Pot 1 irrespective of their ranking position. Ahead of the draw, they were removed as drawing options from Pot 1, and instead automatically assigned to Group position A1.)
Team	Coeff	Rank
Spain (holders) (Note: Defending champions Spain (coefficient 37,962; rank 2nd) were automatically assigned to Pot 1, and could be drawn into either Group position B1, C1, D1, E1 or F1.)	37,962	2
Germany	40,236	1
England	35,963	3
Portugal	35,138	4
Belgium	34,442	5

Pot 2
Team	Coeff	Rank
Italy	34,345	6
Russia	31,345	9
Switzerland	31,254	10
Austria	30,932	11
Croatia	30,642	12
Ukraine	30,313	14

Pot 3
Team	Coeff	Rank
Czech Republic	29,403	15
Sweden	29,028	16
Poland	28,306	17
Romania	28,038	18
Slovakia	27,171	19
Hungary	27,142	20

Pot 4
Team	Coeff	Rank
Turkey	27,033	22
Republic of Ireland	26,902	23
Iceland	25,388	27
Wales	24,531	28
Albania	23,216	31
Northern Ireland	22,961	33

Automatically selected as a top-seeded team into pot 1, irrespective of their ranking position.

Teams were drawn consecutively into Group A to F. First, the Pot 1 teams were assigned to the first positions of their groups, while next the positions of all other teams were drawn separately from Pot 4 to 2 (for the purposes of determining the match schedules in each group).

The draw resulted in the following groups:

Group A
Team
France
Romania
Albania
Switzerland

Group B
Team
England
Russia
Wales
Slovakia

Group C
Team
Germany
Ukraine
Poland
Northern Ireland

Group D
Team
Spain
Czech Republic
Turkey
Croatia

Group E
Team
Belgium
Italy
Republic of Ireland
Sweden

Group F
Team
Portugal
Iceland
Austria
Hungary

== Venues ==
Ten stadiums were used for the competition. Initially, twelve stadiums were presented for the French bid, chosen on 28 May 2010. These venues were to be whittled down to nine by the end of May 2011, but it was suggested in June 2011 that eleven venues might be used. The French Football Federation had to decide which nine would be selected.

The choice for the first seven was undisputed – the national Stade de France, four newly constructed ones in Lille Metropole (Villeneuve-d'Ascq), Décines-Charpieu (Lyon Metropolis), Nice and Bordeaux, and two stadiums in the two largest cities, Paris and Marseille. After Strasbourg opted out for financial reasons following relegation, two more venues were selected to be Lens and Nancy, leaving Toulouse and Saint-Étienne as reserve options.

In June 2011, the number of host venues was increased to eleven due to the new tournament format featuring 24 teams, instead of the previous 16. The decision meant that the reserve cities of Toulouse and Saint-Étienne joined the list of hosts. Then, in December 2011, Nancy announced its withdrawal from the tournament, after plans for the stadium's renovation were cancelled, finalising the list of host venues at ten.

Two other possible options, the Stade de la Beaujoire in Nantes and the Stade de la Mosson in Montpellier (venues which were used for the 1998 World Cup) were not chosen. The final list was confirmed by the UEFA Executive Committee on 25 January 2013. Capacity figures are those for matches at UEFA Euro 2016 and are not necessarily the total capacity that the venues are capable of holding.

Saint-Denis (Paris Area)	Marseille	Décines-Charpieu (Lyon Area)	Villeneuve-d'Ascq (Lille Area)
Stade de France	Stade Vélodrome	Parc Olympique Lyonnais	Stade Pierre-Mauroy
Capacity: 81,338	Capacity: 67,394	Capacity: 59,286	Capacity: 50,186
Paris	Location of the host cities of the UEFA Euro 2016.		Bordeaux
Parc des Princes	Location of the host cities of the UEFA Euro 2016.		Stade de Bordeaux
Capacity: 48,712	Location of the host cities of the UEFA Euro 2016.		Capacity: 42,115
Saint-Étienne	Lens	Nice	Toulouse
Stade Geoffroy-Guichard	Stade Bollaert-Delelis	Stade de Nice	Stadium de Toulouse
Capacity: 41,965	Capacity: 38,223	Capacity: 35,624	Capacity: 33,150

=== Team base camps ===
Each team had a "team base camp" for its stay between the matches. The teams trained and resided in these locations throughout the tournament, travelling to games staged away from their bases. From an initial list of 66 bases, the 24 participating teams had to confirm their selection with UEFA by 31 January 2016.

The selected team base camps were announced on 2 March 2016:

Team	Base camp
Albania	Perros-Guirec
Austria	Mallemort
Belgium	Bordeaux/Le Pian-Médoc
Croatia	Deauville/Cœur Côte Fleurie
Czech Republic	Tours
England	Chantilly
France	Clairefontaine-en-Yvelines
Germany	Évian-les-Bains
Hungary	Tourrettes
Iceland	Annecy/Annecy-le-Vieux
Italy	Grammont/Montpellier
Northern Ireland	Saint-Georges-de-Reneins
Poland	La Baule-Escoublac
Portugal	Marcoussis
Republic of Ireland	Versailles
Romania	Orry-la-Ville
Russia	Croissy-sur-Seine
Slovakia	Vichy
Spain	Saint-Martin-de-Ré
Sweden	Saint-Nazaire/Pornichet
Switzerland	Montpellier/Juvignac
Turkey	Saint-Cyr-sur-Mer
Ukraine	Aix-en-Provence
Wales	Dinard

== Finals format ==
To accommodate the expansion from a 16-team finals tournament to 24 teams, the format was changed from the one used in 2012 with the addition of two extra groups in the group stage, and an extra round in the knockout stage. The six groups (A to F) still contained four teams each, with the top two from each group still going through to the knockout stage. In the new format, however, the four best third-ranked sides also progressed, leaving 16 teams going into the new round of 16 knockout stage (ahead of the usual quarter-finals, semi-finals and final), and only eight teams going out after the group stage. The format was the same as the one which was applied to the 1986, 1990, and 1994 FIFA World Cups, except for the absence of a third place play-off.

This format generated a total of 51 matches, compared with 31 matches for the previous 16-team tournament, played over a period of 31 days. UEFA's general secretary Gianni Infantino previously described the format as "not ideal" due to the need for third-ranked teams in the group stage advancing, leading to difficulty in preventing situations where teams might be able to know in advance what results they needed to progress out of the group; this led to the risk of a lack of suspense for fans, or even the prospect of mutually beneficial collusion between teams.

== Squads ==
Each national team had to submit a squad of 23 players, three of whom had to be goalkeepers, at least ten days before the opening match of the tournament. If a player became injured or ill severely enough to prevent his participation in the tournament before his team's first match, he could be replaced by another player.

== Match officials ==
On 15 December 2015, UEFA named eighteen referees for Euro 2016. The full referee teams were announced on 1 March 2016. England was the only country to have two referees in the tournament.

Hungarian referee Viktor Kassai was chosen to officiate the opener between France and Romania. English referee Mark Clattenburg was chosen to officiate the final between Portugal and France.

Country	Referee	Assistant referees	Additional assistant referees	Matches assigned
England	Martin Atkinson	Michael Mullarkey; Stephen Child; Gary Beswick (standby)	Michael Oliver; Craig Pawson	Germany–Ukraine (Group C); Hungary–Portugal (Group F); Wales–Northern Ireland (Round of 16)
Germany	Felix Brych	Mark Borsch; Stefan Lupp; Marco Achmüller (standby)	Bastian Dankert; Marco Fritz	England–Wales (Group B); Sweden–Belgium (Group E); Poland–Portugal (Quarter-finals)
Turkey	Cüneyt Çakır	Bahattin Duran; Tarık Ongun; Mustafa Emre Eyisoy (standby)	Hüseyin Göçek; Barış Şimşek	Portugal–Iceland (Group F); Belgium–Republic of Ireland (Group E); Italy–Spain (Round of 16)
England	Mark Clattenburg	Simon Beck; Jake Collin; Stuart Burt (standby)	Anthony Taylor; Andre Marriner	Belgium–Italy (Group E); Czech Republic–Croatia (Group D); Switzerland–Poland (Round of 16); Portugal–France (Final)
Scotland	Willie Collum	(Republic of Ireland) Damien MacGraith; Francis Connor; Douglas Ross (standby)	Bobby Madden; John Beaton	France–Albania (Group A); Czech Republic–Turkey (Group D)
Sweden	Jonas Eriksson	Mathias Klasenius; Daniel Wärnmark; Mehmet Culum (standby)	Stefan Johannesson; Markus Strömbergsson	Turkey–Croatia (Group D); Russia–Wales (Group B); Portugal–Wales (Semi-finals)
Romania	Ovidiu Hațegan	Octavian Șovre; Sebastian Gheorghe; Radu Ghinguleac (standby)	Alexandru Tudor; Sebastian Colțescu	Poland–Northern Ireland (Group C); Italy–Republic of Ireland (Group E)
Russia	Sergei Karasev	~~Anton Averyanov~~; Tikhon Kalugin; Nikolai Golubev (Note: Anton Averyanov was replaced by Nikolai Golubev after failing a fitness test.)	Sergey Lapochkin; Sergey Ivanov	Romania–Switzerland (Group A); Iceland–Hungary (Group F)
Hungary	Viktor Kassai	György Ring; Vencel Tóth; István Albert (standby)	Tamás Bognár; Ádám Farkas	France–Romania (Group A); Italy–Sweden (Group E); Germany–Italy (Quarter-finals)
Czech Republic	Pavel Královec	(Slovakia) Roman Slyško; ~~Martin Wilczek~~; Tomáš Mokrusch (Note: Martin Wilczek was replaced by Tomáš Mokrusch after failing a fitness test.)	Petr Ardeleánu; Michal Paták	Ukraine–Northern Ireland (Group C); Romania–Albania (Group A)
Netherlands	Björn Kuipers	Sander van Roekel; Erwin Zeinstra; Mario Diks (standby)	Pol van Boekel; Richard Liesveld	Germany–Poland (Group C); Croatia–Spain (Group D); France–Iceland (Quarter-finals)
Poland	Szymon Marciniak	Paweł Sokolnicki; Tomasz Listkiewicz; Radosław Siejka (standby)	Paweł Raczkowski; Tomasz Musiał	Spain–Czech Republic (Group D); Iceland–Austria (Group F); Germany–Slovakia (Round of 16)
Serbia	Milorad Mažić	Milovan Ristić; Dalibor Đurđević; Nemanja Petrović (standby)	Danilo Grujić; Nenad Đokić	Republic of Ireland–Sweden (Group E); Spain–Turkey (Group D); Hungary–Belgium (Round of 16)
Norway	Svein Oddvar Moen	Kim Thomas Haglund; Frank Andås; Sven Erik Midthjell (standby)	Ken Henry Johnsen; Svein-Erik Edvartsen	Wales–Slovakia (Group B); Ukraine–Poland (Group C)
Italy	Nicola Rizzoli	Elenito Di Liberatore; Mauro Tonolini; Gianluca Cariolato (standby)	~~Luca Banti~~; Antonio Damato; Daniele Orsato (Note: Luca Banti was replaced by Daniele Orsato after withdrawing for personal reasons.)	England–Russia (Group B); Portugal–Austria (Group F); France–Republic of Ireland (Round of 16); Germany–France (Semi-finals)
Slovenia	Damir Skomina	Jure Praprotnik; Robert Vukan; Bojan Ul (standby)	Matej Jug; Slavko Vinčić	Russia–Slovakia (Group B); Switzerland–France (Group A); England–Iceland (Round of 16); Wales–Belgium (Quarter-finals)
France	Clément Turpin	Frédéric Cano; Nicolas Danos; Cyril Gringore (standby)	Benoît Bastien; Fredy Fautrel	Austria–Hungary (Group F); Northern Ireland–Germany (Group C)
Spain	Carlos Velasco Carballo	Roberto Alonso Fernández; Juan Carlos Yuste Jiménez; Raúl Cabañero Martínez (standby)	Jesús Gil Manzano; Carlos del Cerro Grande	Albania–Switzerland (Group A); Slovakia–England (Group B); Croatia–Portugal (Round of 16)

Two match officials, who serve only as fourth officials, and two reserve assistant referees were also named:

Country	Fourth official	Reserve assistant referee
Belarus	Aleksei Kulbakov	Vitali Maliutsin
Greece	Anastasios Sidiropoulos	Damianos Efthymiadis

== Opening ceremony ==
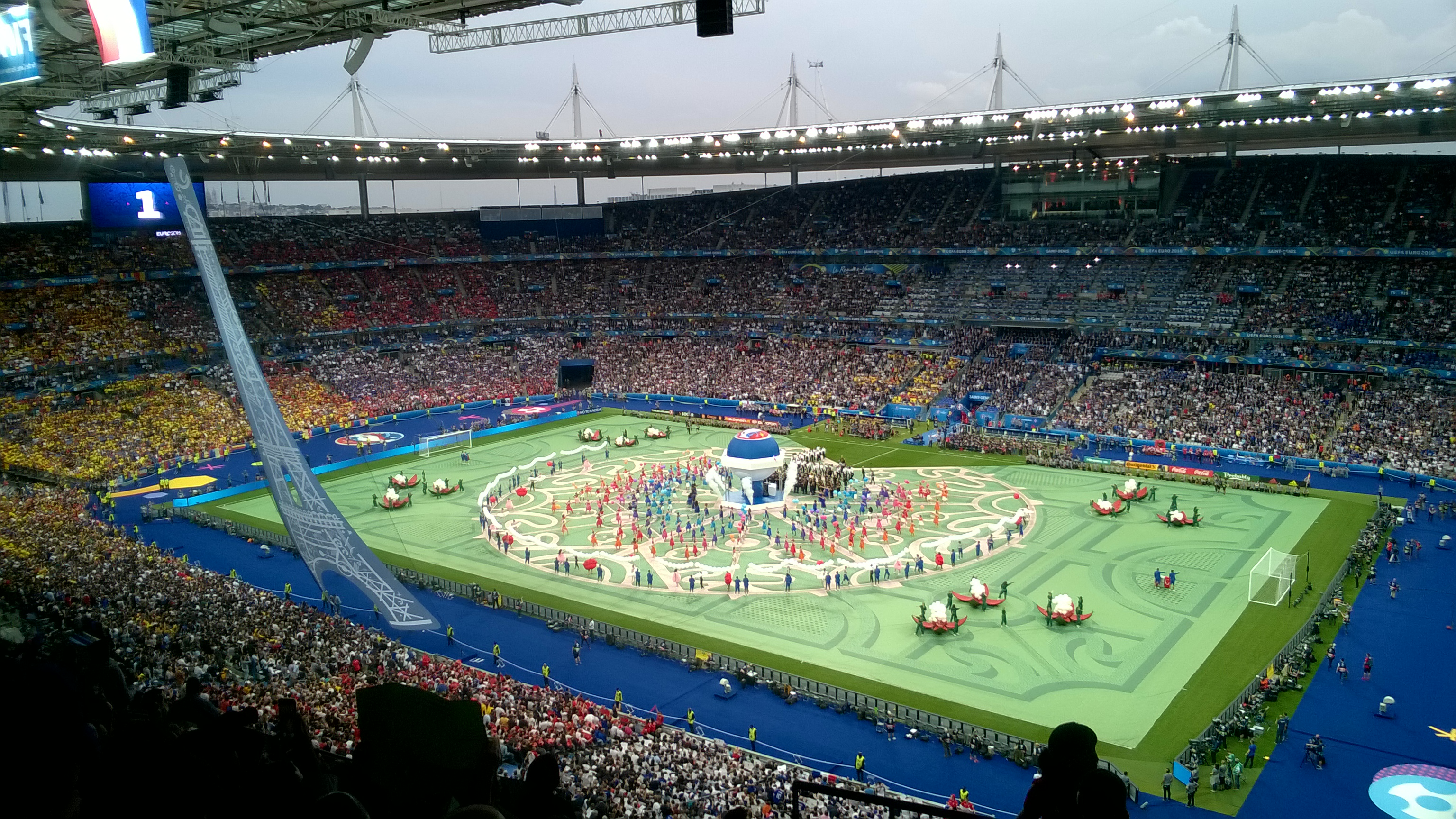
The opening ceremony

An hour before the first match at the Stade de France on 10 June 2016, 20:00 CEST, the opening ceremony of the tournament was held. The ceremony featuring 600 dancers, 150 of which were involved in a traditional French dance before an uptempo version of "La Vie en rose" by French singer Édith Piaf was played. Following this, French DJ David Guetta took to the stage, he performed shortened versions of some of his hits before he was joined on stage by Swedish singer Zara Larsson to perform the official song of the tournament "This One's for You".

David Guetta's setlist
1. "I Gotta Feeling"
2. "Play Hard"
3. "Bang My Head"
4. "Titanium"
5. "This One's for You" (with Zara Larsson)

The ceremony ended with a fly over from the Patrouille Acrobatique de France of the French Air Force, trailing the French blue, white, and red. The ceremony also featured a tribute to the victims of the November 2015 Paris attacks. Following the ceremony, the hosts France beat Romania 2–1 in the opening game of the tournament.

== Group stage ==
Result of teams participating in UEFA Euro 2016: Winner Runner-up / Semi-finals Quarter-finals / Round of 16 Group stage

UEFA announced the tournament schedule on 25 April 2014, which was confirmed on 12 December 2015, after the final draw.

Group winners, runners-up, and the best four third-placed teams advanced to the Round of 16.

All times are local, CEST (UTC+2). France beat Romania 2–1 in the 1st match of EURO 2016.

=== Tiebreakers ===
If two or more teams were equal on points on completion of the group matches, the following tie-breaking criteria were applied:

1. Higher number of points obtained in the matches played between the teams in question;
2. Superior goal difference resulting from the matches played between the teams in question;
3. Higher number of goals scored in the matches played between the teams in question;
4. If, after having applied criteria 1 to 3, teams still had an equal ranking (e.g. if criteria 1 to 3 were applied to three teams that were level on points initially and these criteria separated one team from the other two who still have an equal ranking), criteria 1 to 3 were reapplied exclusively to the matches between the teams who were still level to determine their final rankings. If this procedure did not lead to a decision, criteria 5 to 8 applied;
5. Superior goal difference in all group matches;
6. Higher number of goals scored in all group matches;
7. Fair play conduct (1 point for a single yellow card, 3 points for a red card as a consequence of two yellow cards, 3 points for a direct red card);
8. Position in the UEFA national team coefficient ranking system.

However, the normal tiebreaking criteria do not apply if on the last round of group stage, two teams are playing against each other with the same number of points, goal difference, goals scored, and goals conceded, then drew their match and no other teams are tied on points. In that case, their ranking was determined by a penalty shoot-out.

=== Group A ===
Pos	Team	Pld	W	D	L	GF	GA	GD	Pts	Qualification
1	France (H)	3	2	1	0	4	1	+3	7	Advance to knockout stage
2	Switzerland	3	1	2	0	2	1	+1	5	Advance to knockout stage
3	Albania	3	1	0	2	1	3	−2	3	
4	Romania	3	0	1	2	2	4	−2	1	

Source: UEFA
(H) Hosts
10 June 2016
21:00

France	2–1	Romania
Giroud 57'; Payet 89'	Report	Stancu 65' (pen.)

Stade de France, Saint-Denis
Attendance: 75,113
Referee: Viktor Kassai (Hungary)
11 June 2016
15:00

Albania	0–1	Switzerland
	Report	Schär 5'

Stade Bollaert-Delelis, Lens
Attendance: 33,805
Referee: Carlos Velasco Carballo (Spain)

15 June 2016
18:00

Romania	1–1	Switzerland
Stancu 18' (pen.)	Report	Mehmedi 57'

Parc des Princes, Paris
Attendance: 43,576
Referee: Sergei Karasev (Russia)
15 June 2016
21:00

France	2–0	Albania
Griezmann 90'; Payet 90+6'	Report

Stade Vélodrome, Marseille
Attendance: 63,670
Referee: Willie Collum (Scotland)

19 June 2016
21:00

Romania	0–1	Albania
	Report	Sadiku 43'

Parc Olympique Lyonnais, Décines-Charpieu
Attendance: 49,752
Referee: Pavel Královec (Czech Republic)
19 June 2016
21:00

Switzerland	0–0	France
	Report

Stade Pierre-Mauroy, Villeneuve-d'Ascq
Attendance: 45,616
Referee: Damir Skomina (Slovenia)

=== Group B ===
Pos	Team	Pld	W	D	L	GF	GA	GD	Pts	Qualification
1	Wales	3	2	0	1	6	3	+3	6	Advance to knockout stage
2	England	3	1	2	0	3	2	+1	5	Advance to knockout stage
3	Slovakia	3	1	1	1	3	3	0	4	Advance to knockout stage
4	Russia	3	0	1	2	2	6	−4	1	

Source: UEFA
11 June 2016
18:00

Wales	2–1	Slovakia
Bale 10'; Robson-Kanu 81'	Report	Duda 61'

Stade de Bordeaux, Bordeaux
Attendance: 37,831
Referee: Svein Oddvar Moen (Norway)
11 June 2016
21:00

England	1–1	Russia
Dier 73'	Report	V. Berezutski 90+2'

Stade Vélodrome, Marseille
Attendance: 62,343
Referee: Nicola Rizzoli (Italy)

15 June 2016
15:00

Russia	1–2	Slovakia
Glushakov 80'	Report	Weiss 32'; Hamšík 45'

Stade Pierre-Mauroy, Villeneuve-d'Ascq
Attendance: 38,989
Referee: Damir Skomina (Slovenia)
16 June 2016
15:00

England	2–1	Wales
Vardy 56'; Sturridge 90+2'	Report	Bale 42'

Stade Bollaert-Delelis, Lens
Attendance: 34,033
Referee: Felix Brych (Germany)

20 June 2016
21:00

Russia	0–3	Wales
	Report	Ramsey 11'; Taylor 20'; Bale 67'

Stadium Municipal, Toulouse
Attendance: 28,840
Referee: Jonas Eriksson (Sweden)
20 June 2016
21:00

Slovakia	0–0	England
	Report

Stade Geoffroy-Guichard, Saint-Étienne
Attendance: 39,051
Referee: Carlos Velasco Carballo (Spain)

=== Group C ===
Pos	Team	Pld	W	D	L	GF	GA	GD	Pts	Qualification
1	Germany	3	2	1	0	3	0	+3	7 (Note: Tied on head-to-head result (Germany 0–0 Poland). Overall goal difference was used as the tiebreaker.)	Advance to knockout stage
2	Poland	3	2	1	0	2	0	+2	7	Advance to knockout stage
3	Northern Ireland	3	1	0	2	2	2	0	3	Advance to knockout stage
4	Ukraine	3	0	0	3	0	5	−5	0	

Source: UEFA
Notes:
12 June 2016
18:00

Poland	1–0	Northern Ireland
Milik 51'	Report

Stade de Nice, Nice
Attendance: 33,742
Referee: Ovidiu Hațegan (Romania)
12 June 2016
21:00

Germany	2–0	Ukraine
Mustafi 19'; Schweinsteiger 90+2'	Report

Stade Pierre-Mauroy, Villeneuve-d'Ascq
Attendance: 43,035
Referee: Martin Atkinson (England)

16 June 2016
18:00

Ukraine	0–2	Northern Ireland
	Report	McAuley 49'; McGinn 90+6'

Parc Olympique Lyonnais, Décines-Charpieu
Attendance: 51,043
Referee: Pavel Královec (Czech Republic)
16 June 2016
21:00

Germany	0–0	Poland
	Report

Stade de France, Saint-Denis
Attendance: 73,648
Referee: Björn Kuipers (Netherlands)

21 June 2016
18:00

Ukraine	0–1	Poland
	Report	Błaszczykowski 54'

Stade Vélodrome, Marseille
Attendance: 58,874
Referee: Svein Oddvar Moen (Norway)
21 June 2016
18:00

Northern Ireland	0–1	Germany
	Report	Gómez 30'

Parc des Princes, Paris
Attendance: 44,125
Referee: Clément Turpin (France)

=== Group D ===
Pos	Team	Pld	W	D	L	GF	GA	GD	Pts	Qualification
1	Croatia	3	2	1	0	5	3	+2	7	Advance to knockout stage
2	Spain	3	2	0	1	5	2	+3	6	Advance to knockout stage
3	Turkey	3	1	0	2	2	4	−2	3	
4	Czech Republic	3	0	1	2	2	5	−3	1	

Source: UEFA
12 June 2016
15:00

Turkey	0–1	Croatia
	Report	Modrić 41'

Parc des Princes, Paris
Attendance: 43,842
Referee: Jonas Eriksson (Sweden)
13 June 2016
15:00

Spain	1–0	Czech Republic
Piqué 87'	Report

Stadium Municipal, Toulouse
Attendance: 29,400
Referee: Szymon Marciniak (Poland)

17 June 2016
18:00

Czech Republic	2–2	Croatia
Škoda 76'; Necid 89' (pen.)	Report	Perišić 37'; Rakitić 59'

Stade Geoffroy-Guichard, Saint-Étienne
Attendance: 38,376
Referee: Mark Clattenburg (England)
17 June 2016
21:00

Spain	3–0	Turkey
Morata 34', 48'; Nolito 37'	Report

Stade de Nice, Nice
Attendance: 33,409
Referee: Milorad Mažić (Serbia)

21 June 2016
21:00

Czech Republic	0–2	Turkey
	Report	Yılmaz 10'; Tufan 65'

Stade Bollaert-Delelis, Lens
Attendance: 32,836
Referee: Willie Collum (Scotland)
21 June 2016
21:00

Croatia	2–1	Spain
N. Kalinić 45'; Perišić 87'	Report	Morata 7'

Stade de Bordeaux, Bordeaux
Attendance: 37,245
Referee: Björn Kuipers (Netherlands)

=== Group E ===
Pos	Team	Pld	W	D	L	GF	GA	GD	Pts	Qualification
1	Italy	3	2	0	1	3	1	+2	6 (Note: Head-to-head result: Belgium 0–2 Italy.)	Advance to knockout stage
2	Belgium	3	2	0	1	4	2	+2	6	Advance to knockout stage
3	Republic of Ireland	3	1	1	1	2	4	−2	4	Advance to knockout stage
4	Sweden	3	0	1	2	1	3	−2	1	

Source: UEFA
Notes:
13 June 2016
18:00

Republic of Ireland	1–1	Sweden
Hoolahan 48'	Report	Clark 71' (o.g.)

Stade de France, Saint-Denis
Attendance: 73,419
Referee: Milorad Mažić (Serbia)
13 June 2016
21:00

Belgium	0–2	Italy
	Report	Giaccherini 32'; Pellè 90+3'

Parc Olympique Lyonnais, Décines-Charpieu
Attendance: 55,408
Referee: Mark Clattenburg (England)

17 June 2016
15:00

Italy	1–0	Sweden
Éder 88'	Report

Stadium Municipal, Toulouse
Attendance: 29,600
Referee: Viktor Kassai (Hungary)
18 June 2016
15:00

Belgium	3–0	Republic of Ireland
R. Lukaku 48', 70'; Witsel 61'	Report

Stade de Bordeaux, Bordeaux
Attendance: 39,493
Referee: Cüneyt Çakır (Turkey)

22 June 2016
21:00

Italy	0–1	Republic of Ireland
	Report	Brady 85'

Stade Pierre-Mauroy, Villeneuve-d'Ascq
Attendance: 44,268
Referee: Ovidiu Hațegan (Romania)
22 June 2016
21:00

Sweden	0–1	Belgium
	Report	Nainggolan 84'

Stade de Nice, Nice
Attendance: 34,011
Referee: Felix Brych (Germany)

=== Group F ===
Pos	Team	Pld	W	D	L	GF	GA	GD	Pts	Qualification
1	Hungary	3	1	2	0	6	4	+2	5 (Note: Tied on head-to-head result (Iceland 1–1 Hungary). Overall goal difference was used as the tiebreaker.)	Advance to knockout stage
2	Iceland	3	1	2	0	4	3	+1	5	Advance to knockout stage
3	Portugal	3	0	3	0	4	4	0	3	Advance to knockout stage
4	Austria	3	0	1	2	1	4	−3	1	

Source: UEFA
Notes:
14 June 2016
18:00

Austria	0–2	Hungary
	Report	Szalai 62'; Stieber 87'

Stade de Bordeaux, Bordeaux
Attendance: 34,424
Referee: Clément Turpin (France)
14 June 2016
21:00

Portugal	1–1	Iceland
Nani 31'	Report	B. Bjarnason 50'

Stade Geoffroy-Guichard, Saint-Étienne
Attendance: 38,742
Referee: Cüneyt Çakır (Turkey)

18 June 2016
18:00

Iceland	1–1	Hungary
G. Sigurðsson 40' (pen.)	Report	Sævarsson 88' (o.g.)

Stade Vélodrome, Marseille
Attendance: 60,842
Referee: Sergei Karasev (Russia)
18 June 2016
21:00

Portugal	0–0	Austria
	Report

Parc des Princes, Paris
Attendance: 44,291
Referee: Nicola Rizzoli (Italy)

22 June 2016
18:00

Iceland	2–1	Austria
Böðvarsson 18'; Traustason 90+4'	Report	Schöpf 60'

Stade de France, Saint-Denis
Attendance: 68,714
Referee: Szymon Marciniak (Poland)
22 June 2016
18:00

Hungary	3–3	Portugal
Gera 19'; Dzsudzsák 47', 55'	Report	Nani 42'; Ronaldo 50', 62'

Parc Olympique Lyonnais, Décines-Charpieu
Attendance: 55,514
Referee: Martin Atkinson (England)

=== Ranking of third-placed teams ===
Pos	Grp	Team	Pld	W	D	L	GF	GA	GD	Pts	Qualification
1	B	Slovakia	3	1	1	1	3	3	0	4	Advance to knockout stage
2	E	Republic of Ireland	3	1	1	1	2	4	−2	4	Advance to knockout stage
3	F	Portugal	3	0	3	0	4	4	0	3	Advance to knockout stage
4	C	Northern Ireland	3	1	0	2	2	2	0	3	Advance to knockout stage
5	D	Turkey	3	1	0	2	2	4	−2	3	
6	A	Albania	3	1	0	2	1	3	−2	3	

Source: UEFA
Rules for classification: 1) Higher number of points obtained; 2) Superior goal difference; 3) Higher number of goals scored; 4) Fair play conduct; 5) Position in the UEFA national team coefficient ranking system.

== Knockout stage ==
In the knockout stage, extra time and a penalty shoot-out were used to decide the winner if necessary.

As with every tournament since UEFA Euro 1984, there was no third place play-off.

All times are local, CEST (UTC+2).

=== Bracket ===
Round of 16
25 June – Saint-Étienne
Switzerland	1 (4)
Poland (p)	1 (5)
25 June – Lens
Croatia	0
Portugal (a.e.t.)	1
25 June – Paris
Wales	1
Northern Ireland	0
26 June – Toulouse
Hungary	0
Belgium	4
26 June – Villeneuve-d'Ascq
Germany	3
Slovakia	0
27 June – Saint-Denis
Italy	2
Spain	0
26 June – Décines-Charpieu
France	2
Republic of Ireland	1
27 June – Nice
England	1
Iceland	2

Quarter-finals
30 June – Marseille
Poland	1 (3)
Portugal (p)	1 (5)
1 July – Villeneuve-d'Ascq
Wales	3
Belgium	1
2 July – Bordeaux
Germany (p)	1 (6)
Italy	1 (5)
3 July – Saint-Denis
France	5
Iceland	2

Semi-finals
6 July – Décines-Charpieu
Portugal	2
Wales	0
7 July – Marseille
Germany	0
France	2

Final
10 July – Saint-Denis
Portugal (a.e.t.)	1
France	0

=== Round of 16 ===
25 June 2016
15:00

Switzerland	1–1 (a.e.t.)	Poland
Shaqiri 82'	Report	Błaszczykowski 39'
Penalties
Lichtsteiner (penalty scored); Xhaka (penalty missed); Shaqiri (penalty scored); Schär (penalty scored); Rodriguez (penalty scored)	4–5	(penalty scored) Lewandowski; (penalty scored) Milik; (penalty scored) Glik; (penalty scored) Błaszczykowski; (penalty scored) Krychowiak

Stade Geoffroy-Guichard, Saint-Étienne
Attendance: 38,842
Referee: Mark Clattenburg (England)

25 June 2016
18:00

Wales	1–0	Northern Ireland
McAuley 75' (o.g.)	Report

Parc des Princes, Paris
Attendance: 44,342
Referee: Martin Atkinson (England)

25 June 2016
21:00

Croatia	0–1 (a.e.t.)	Portugal
	Report	Quaresma 117'

Stade Bollaert-Delelis, Lens
Attendance: 33,523
Referee: Carlos Velasco Carballo (Spain)

26 June 2016
15:00

France	2–1	Republic of Ireland
Griezmann 58', 61'	Report	Brady 2' (pen.)

Parc Olympique Lyonnais, Décines-Charpieu
Attendance: 56,279
Referee: Nicola Rizzoli (Italy)

26 June 2016
18:00

Germany	3–0	Slovakia
Boateng 8'; Gómez 43'; Draxler 63'	Report

Stade Pierre-Mauroy, Villeneuve-d'Ascq
Attendance: 44,312
Referee: Szymon Marciniak (Poland)

26 June 2016
21:00

Hungary	0–4	Belgium
	Report	Alderweireld 10'; Batshuayi 78'; Hazard 80'; Carrasco 90+1'

Stadium Municipal, Toulouse
Attendance: 28,921
Referee: Milorad Mažić (Serbia)

27 June 2016
18:00

Italy	2–0	Spain
Chiellini 33'; Pellè 90+1'	Report

Stade de France, Saint-Denis
Attendance: 76,165
Referee: Cüneyt Çakır (Turkey)

27 June 2016
21:00

England	1–2	Iceland
Rooney 4' (pen.)	Report	R. Sigurðsson 6'; Sigþórsson 18'

Stade de Nice, Nice
Attendance: 33,901
Referee: Damir Skomina (Slovenia)

=== Quarter-finals ===
30 June 2016
21:00

Poland	1–1 (a.e.t.)	Portugal
Lewandowski 2'	Report	Sanches 33'
Penalties
Lewandowski (penalty scored); Milik (penalty scored); Glik (penalty scored); Błaszczykowski (penalty missed)	3–5	(penalty scored) Ronaldo; (penalty scored) Sanches; (penalty scored) Moutinho; (penalty scored) Nani; (penalty scored) Quaresma

Stade Vélodrome, Marseille
Attendance: 62,940
Referee: Felix Brych (Germany)

1 July 2016
21:00

Wales	3–1	Belgium
A. Williams 31'; Robson-Kanu 55'; Vokes 86'	Report	Nainggolan 13'

Stade Pierre-Mauroy, Villeneuve-d'Ascq
Attendance: 45,936
Referee: Damir Skomina (Slovenia)

2 July 2016
21:00

Germany	1–1 (a.e.t.)	Italy
Özil 65'	Report	Bonucci 78' (pen.)
Penalties
Kroos (penalty scored); Müller (penalty missed); Özil (penalty missed); Draxler (penalty scored); Schweinsteiger (penalty missed); Hummels (penalty scored); Kimmich (penalty scored); Boateng (penalty scored); Hector (penalty scored)	6–5	(penalty scored) Insigne; (penalty missed) Zaza; (penalty scored) Barzagli; (penalty missed) Pellè; (penalty missed) Bonucci; (penalty scored) Giaccherini; (penalty scored) Parolo; (penalty scored) De Sciglio; (penalty missed) Darmian

Stade de Bordeaux, Bordeaux
Attendance: 38,764
Referee: Viktor Kassai (Hungary)

3 July 2016
21:00

France	5–2	Iceland
Giroud 12', 59'; Pogba 20'; Payet 43'; Griezmann 45'	Report	Sigþórsson 56'; B. Bjarnason 84'

Stade de France, Saint-Denis
Attendance: 76,833
Referee: Björn Kuipers (Netherlands)

=== Semi-finals ===
6 July 2016
21:00

Portugal	2–0	Wales
Ronaldo 50'; Nani 53'	Report

Parc Olympique Lyonnais, Décines-Charpieu
Attendance: 55,679
Referee: Jonas Eriksson (Sweden)

7 July 2016
21:00

Germany	0–2	France
	Report	Griezmann 45+2' (pen.), 72'

Stade Vélodrome, Marseille
Attendance: 64,078
Referee: Nicola Rizzoli (Italy)

=== Final ===
10 July 2016
21:00

Portugal	1–0 (a.e.t.)	France
Eder 109'	Report

Stade de France, Saint-Denis
Attendance: 75,868
Referee: Mark Clattenburg (England)

== Statistics ==
=== Goals ===
There were 108 goals scored in 51 matches, for an average of 2.12 goals per match.

6 goals

- (France) Antoine Griezmann

3 goals

- (France) Olivier Giroud
- (France) Dimitri Payet
- (Portugal) Nani
- (Portugal) Cristiano Ronaldo
- (Spain) Álvaro Morata
- (Wales) Gareth Bale

2 goals

- (Belgium) Romelu Lukaku
- (Belgium) Radja Nainggolan
- (Croatia) Ivan Perišić
- (Germany) Mario Gómez
- (Hungary) Balázs Dzsudzsák
- (Iceland) Birkir Bjarnason
- (Iceland) Kolbeinn Sigþórsson
- (Italy) Graziano Pellè
- (Poland) Jakub Błaszczykowski
- (Republic of Ireland) Robbie Brady
- (Romania) Bogdan Stancu
- (Wales) Hal Robson-Kanu

1 goal

- (Albania) Armando Sadiku
- (Austria) Alessandro Schöpf
- (Belgium) Toby Alderweireld
- (Belgium) Michy Batshuayi
- (Belgium) Yannick Carrasco
- (Belgium) Eden Hazard
- (Belgium) Axel Witsel
- (Croatia) Nikola Kalinić
- (Croatia) Luka Modrić
- (Croatia) Ivan Rakitić
- (Czech Republic) Tomáš Necid
- (Czech Republic) Milan Škoda
- (England) Eric Dier
- (England) Wayne Rooney
- (England) Daniel Sturridge
- (England) Jamie Vardy
- (France) Paul Pogba
- (Germany) Jérôme Boateng
- (Germany) Julian Draxler
- (Germany) Shkodran Mustafi
- (Germany) Mesut Özil
- (Germany) Bastian Schweinsteiger
- (Hungary) Zoltán Gera
- (Hungary) Zoltán Stieber
- (Hungary) Ádám Szalai
- (Iceland) Jón Daði Böðvarsson
- (Iceland) Gylfi Sigurðsson
- (Iceland) Ragnar Sigurðsson
- (Iceland) Arnór Ingvi Traustason
- (Italy) Leonardo Bonucci
- (Italy) Giorgio Chiellini
- (Italy) Éder
- (Italy) Emanuele Giaccherini
- (Northern Ireland) Gareth McAuley
- (Northern Ireland) Niall McGinn
- (Poland) Robert Lewandowski
- (Poland) Arkadiusz Milik
- (Portugal) Eder
- (Portugal) Ricardo Quaresma
- (Portugal) Renato Sanches
- (Republic of Ireland) Wes Hoolahan
- (Russia) Vasili Berezutski
- (Russia) Denis Glushakov
- (Slovakia) Ondrej Duda
- (Slovakia) Marek Hamšík
- (Slovakia) Vladimír Weiss
- (Spain) Nolito
- (Spain) Gerard Piqué
- (Switzerland) Admir Mehmedi
- (Switzerland) Fabian Schär
- (Switzerland) Xherdan Shaqiri
- (Turkey) Ozan Tufan
- (Turkey) Burak Yılmaz
- (Wales) Aaron Ramsey
- (Wales) Neil Taylor
- (Wales) Sam Vokes
- (Wales) Ashley Williams

1 own goal

- (Iceland) Birkir Már Sævarsson (against Hungary)
- (Northern Ireland) Gareth McAuley (against Wales)
- (Republic of Ireland) Ciaran Clark (against Sweden)

Source: UEFA

=== Awards ===

UEFA Team of the Tournament

UEFA Team of the Tournament

The UEFA Technical Team was given the objective of naming a team of eleven players during the tournament, a change from the 23-man squads in the past competitions. The group of analysts watched every game before making the decision following the final. Four players from the winning Portuguese squad were named in the tournament.

Goalkeeper	Defenders	Midfielders	Forward
(Portugal) Rui Patrício	(Germany) Jérôme Boateng (Germany) Joshua Kimmich (Portugal) Raphaël Guerreiro (Portugal) Pepe	(France) Antoine Griezmann (France) Dimitri Payet (Germany) Toni Kroos (Wales) Joe Allen (Wales) Aaron Ramsey	(Portugal) Cristiano Ronaldo

Player of the Tournament

The Player of the Tournament award was given to Antoine Griezmann, who was chosen by UEFA's technical observers, led by UEFA chief technical officer Ioan Lupescu and including Sir Alex Ferguson and Alain Giresse.

- (France) Antoine Griezmann

Young Player of the Tournament

The Young Player of the Tournament award, open to players born on or after 1 January 1994, was given to Renato Sanches who was named above Kingsley Coman and Portugal teammate Raphaël Guerreiro. The particular player, who deserved the award, was also chosen by UEFA's technical observers.

- (Portugal) Renato Sanches – 18 August 1997 (aged 18)

Golden Boot

The Golden Boot was awarded to Antoine Griezmann, who scored one goal in the group stage and five in the knockout stage.

- (France) Antoine Griezmann – 6 goals, 2 assists (555 minutes)

Silver Boot

The Silver Boot was awarded to Cristiano Ronaldo, who scored two goals in the group stage and one in the knockout stage, as well as providing three assists.

- (Portugal) Cristiano Ronaldo – 3 goals, 3 assists (625 minutes)

Bronze Boot

The Bronze Boot was awarded to Olivier Giroud, who scored one goal in the group stage and two in the knockout stage, as well as providing two assists; compatriot Dimitri Payet amassed the same tally, but played 50 more minutes than Giroud.

- (France) Olivier Giroud – 3 goals, 2 assists (456 minutes)

Goal of the Tournament

The Goal of the Tournament was decided by online voting. A total 5 goals were in the shortlist. On 13 July 2016, after an open vote with over 150,000 entries, UEFA announced that Hungarian midfielder Zoltán Gera's goal against Portugal had been named as fans' goal of the tournament. In a separate poll, UEFA's technical observers decided that Swiss winger Xherdan Shaqiri's goal against Poland deserved top spot in their list of the ten best goals of the tournament.

- Fans: (Hungary) Zoltán Gera (vs Portugal)
- Technical observers: (Switzerland) Xherdan Shaqiri (vs Poland)

=== Prize money ===
Prize money
Rank (unoff.)	Team	€ Million
1	Portugal	25.5
2	France	23.5
3	Germany	18.5
4	Wales	18
5	Poland	14.5
6	Belgium; Iceland; Italy	14
9	Croatia	12
10	England; Hungary; Spain; Switzerland	11.5
14	Republic of Ireland; Slovakia	11
16	Northern Ireland	10.5
17	Albania; Turkey	9
19	Austria; Czech Republic; Romania; Russia; Sweden	8.5
24	Ukraine	8

A total of €301 million was distributed to the 24 teams contesting in the tournament, a growth from the €196 million payment in the preceding event. Each team was rewarded €8 million, with further rewards depending on their performances. Portugal, the champions of the competition, were awarded €8 million in addition to any prize money earned in earlier rounds – the biggest prize attainable was €27 million (for winning all group matches and the final).

Full list:

- Prize for participating: €8 million

Extra payment based on team's performance:

- Champions: €8 million
- Runners-up: €5 million
- Reaching the semi-finals: €4 million
- Reaching the quarter-finals: €2.5 million
- Reaching the round of 16: €1.5 million
- Winning a group match: €1 million
- Drawing a group match: €500,000

=== Discipline ===
A player was automatically suspended for the next match for the following offences:

- Receiving a red card (red card suspensions could be extended for serious offences)
- Receiving two yellow cards in two different matches; yellow cards expired after the completion of the quarter-finals (yellow card suspensions were not carried forward to any other future international matches)

The following suspensions were served during the tournament:

Player	Offence(s)	Suspension(s)
(Croatia) Duje Čop	(red card) in qualifying vs Bulgaria (10 October 2015)	Group D vs Turkey (matchday 1; 12 June 2016)
(Czech Republic) Marek Suchý	(red card) in qualifying vs Netherlands (13 October 2015)	Group D vs Spain (matchday 1; 13 June 2016)
(Albania) Lorik Cana	(yellow card) (yellow-red card) in Group A vs Switzerland (matchday 1; 11 June 2016)	Group A vs France (matchday 2; 15 June 2016)
(Austria) Aleksandar Dragović	(yellow card) (yellow-red card) in Group F vs Hungary (matchday 1; 14 June 2016)	Group F vs Portugal (matchday 2; 18 June 2016)
(Albania) Burim Kukeli	(yellow card) in Group A vs Switzerland (matchday 1; 11 June 2016); (yellow card) in Group A vs France (matchday 2; 15 June 2016)	Group A vs Romania (matchday 3; 19 June 2016)
(Iceland) Alfreð Finnbogason	(yellow card) in Group F vs Portugal (matchday 1; 14 June 2016); (yellow card) in Group F vs Hungary (matchday 2; 18 June 2016)	Group F vs Austria (matchday 3; 22 June 2016)
(Poland) Bartosz Kapustka	(yellow card) in Group C vs Northern Ireland (matchday 1; 12 June 2016); (yellow card) in Group C vs Ukraine (matchday 3; 21 June 2016)	Round of 16 vs Switzerland (25 June 2016)
(France) N'Golo Kanté	(yellow card) in Group A vs Albania (matchday 2; 15 June 2016); (yellow card) in Round of 16 vs Republic of Ireland (26 June 2016)	Quarter-finals vs Iceland (3 July 2016)
(France) Adil Rami	(yellow card) in Group A vs Switzerland (matchday 3; 19 June 2016); (yellow card) in Round of 16 vs Republic of Ireland (26 June 2016)	Quarter-finals vs Iceland (3 July 2016)
(Republic of Ireland) Shane Duffy	(red card) in Round of 16 vs France (26 June 2016)	Suspension served outside tournament
(Belgium) Thomas Vermaelen	(yellow card) in Group E vs Republic of Ireland (matchday 2; 18 June 2016); (yellow card) in Round of 16 vs Hungary (26 June 2016)	Quarter-finals vs Wales (1 July 2016)
(Italy) Thiago Motta	(yellow card) in Group E vs Belgium (matchday 1; 13 June 2016); (yellow card) in Round of 16 vs Spain (27 June 2016)	Quarter-finals vs Germany (2 July 2016)
(Portugal) William Carvalho	(yellow card) in Round of 16 vs Croatia (25 June 2016); (yellow card) in Quarter-finals vs Poland (30 June 2016)	Semi-finals vs Wales (6 July 2016)
(Wales) Ben Davies	(yellow card) in Group B vs England (matchday 2; 16 June 2016); (yellow card) in Quarter-finals vs Belgium (1 July 2016)	Semi-finals vs Portugal (6 July 2016)
(Wales) Aaron Ramsey	(yellow card) in Round of 16 vs Northern Ireland (25 June 2016); (yellow card) in Quarter-finals vs Belgium (1 July 2016)	Semi-finals vs Portugal (6 July 2016)
(Germany) Mats Hummels	(yellow card) in Round of 16 vs Slovakia (26 June 2016); (yellow card) in Quarter-finals vs Italy (2 July 2016)	Semi-finals vs France (7 July 2016)

== Issues ==
Pre-tournament concerns included heavy flooding of the River Seine in Paris, and strikes in the transport sector shortly before the beginning of the event.

=== Security ===
Following the attacks on Paris on 13 November 2015, including one in which the intended target was a game at the Stade de France, controversies about the safety of players and tourists during the upcoming tournament arose. Noël Le Graët, president of the French Football Federation, explained that the concern for security had increased following the attacks. He claimed: "there was already a concern for the Euros, now it's obviously a lot higher. We will continue to do everything we can so that security is assured despite all the risks that this entails. I know that everyone is vigilant. Obviously, this means that we will now be even more vigilant. But it's a permanent concern for the federation and the [French] state".

A "suspicious vehicle" near the Stade de France was destroyed by a police-mandated controlled explosion on 3 July, hours before the venue held the quarter-final between France and Iceland.

=== Hooliganism ===
The day before the tournament, fighting broke out between local youths and England fans in Marseille; police dispersed the local youths with tear gas. On 10 June, English fans at Marseille clashed with police. Six English fans were later arrested and sentenced to prison. On 11 June, violent clashes erupted in the streets of the same city before and after the Group B match between England and Russia that ended in a 1–1 draw. One English fan was reported to be critically ill in the hospital while dozens of others were injured in the clashes. On 14 June, the Russian team were given a suspended disqualification, fined €150,000, and warned that future violence would result in their removal from the cup. Additionally, 50 Russian fans were deported. The English team was also warned about disqualification, but was not formally charged. Violence between English and Russian fans arose again in Lille, where a total of 36 fans were arrested, and 16 people were hospitalised.

Late in the Group D match between the Czech Republic and Croatia, flares were thrown onto the pitch from where Croatia supporters were massed. The match was paused for several minutes while they were cleared up. There was also fighting in the Croatia supporters' area. Later that same day, there was violence involving Turkish fans after Turkey's defeat by Spain. As a result of these incidents and earlier crowd troubles after the countries' first matches, UEFA launched official procedures against the Croatian and Turkish football federations. The Croatian federation was fined €100,000 for the incidents.

=== Pitch quality ===
The football pitches at French stadiums were criticised during the group stage for their poor quality. France coach Didier Deschamps was especially critical. UEFA tournament director Martin Kallen blamed heavy rain for damaged turf, though the press speculated that non-football events may have also been a contributor.

The pitch at Lille received particular attention with players slipping continuously and with groundsmen forced at halftime to try to repair the cut up pitch. Despite UEFA applying numerous methods to rectify the problems, such as a ban on pre-match training on the pitch, use of fertilisers, seeding, mowing, light therapy, drying and playing with the roof closed to avoid rain, it was decided that the pitch at Lille had to be entirely replaced following the Italy–Republic of Ireland group match on 22 June. The new pitch was replaced with Dutch grass and was ready before the last sixteen match between Germany and Slovakia on 26 June. UEFA also stated that repair work was also required at the St Denis and Marseille pitches. This was the second time that a Euro championship pitch needed to be re-laid mid-tournament. The first time was the St. Jakob-Park in Basel during Euro 2008.

UEFA's Leeds-based consultant Richard Hayden had come under criticism as it was reported he ordered local groundsmen to re-lay three pitches (Lille, Nice, and Marseille) with Slovak grass, provided by an Austrian company for an estimated €600,000 (£460,000). On 22 June it was reported that France's grass association officials had blamed Hayden for continued problems with the pitches, citing "it is amazing that it is only these pitches that have problems today". The Austrian manufacture of the turf, Richter, responded to the French grass association officials by saying "the turf for the stadiums in Lille and Marseille was delivered in top condition" and that "the turf placement and further care were handled by French companies and no one other than the French grounds-people had control over the grounds condition". In a statement, UEFA rejected the criticism against Hayden as baseless and stated they were satisfied with his work.

=== Moths ===
Before the final match started, the stadium was invaded by Silver Y moths, which caused some irritation to the players, staff and coaches. The infestation occurred after workers at the stadium left the lights switched on the day before the match. The players and coaches of each team during the warm-up tried swatting the moths, and ground staff used brushes to clean moths from the walls, ground and other places. One moth was captured flying on and around Cristiano Ronaldo's face when he was sitting on the pitch after being injured during the match.

== Marketing ==
=== Video game ===
The UEFA Euro 2016 video game was released by Konami as a free DLC on Pro Evolution Soccer 2016. The DLC was available for existing Pro Evolution Soccer 2016 members on 24 March 2016 for major platforms (PlayStation 3, PlayStation 4, Xbox 360, Xbox One and Microsoft Windows). The game was released physically and digitally on 21 April for PlayStation 3 and PlayStation 4 users.

=== Logo and slogan ===
The official logo was unveiled on 26 June 2013, during a ceremony at the Pavillon Cambon Capucines in Paris. Conceived by Portuguese agency Brandia Central, which also created the visual identity for the previous European Championship, the design is based on the theme "Celebrating the art of football". The logo depicts the Henri Delaunay Trophy with the blue, white and red colours of the French flag, surrounded by a mixture of shapes and lines representing different artistic movements and football elements.

On 17 October 2013, UEFA announced the official slogan of the tournament: Le Rendez-Vous. Asked about its meaning, Jacques Lambert, chairman of the Euro 2016 organising committee, told that the slogan "is much more than a reminder of dates (...) and venues". He further explained that "UEFA is sending out an invitation to football fans throughout the world and to lovers of major events, an invitation to meet up and share the emotions of an elite-level tournament".

=== Match balls ===
For the first time in the tournament's history, two official match balls were used. The "Adidas Beau Jeu", used for the group stage, was unveiled on 12 November 2015 by former France player Zinedine Zidane. During the tournament, the "Adidas Fracas" was introduced as the exclusive match ball for the knockout rounds.

=== Mascot ===
The official mascot of the tournament, "Super Victor", was unveiled on 18 November 2014. He is a child superhero in the kit of the France national football team, with a red cape at the back, to echo the colours of the flag of France. The cape, boots and ball are claimed to be the child's superpowers. The mascot first appeared during the match between France and Sweden at the Stade Vélodrome, Marseille on 18 November 2014. The name of the mascot was revealed on 30 November 2014 after receiving about 50,000 votes from the public on the official UEFA website, beating the other nominated names of "Driblou" and "Goalix". It is based on the idea of victory and references the boy's super powers that he gained when he found the magic cape, boots and ball.

The name of the mascot is the same as the name of a sex toy. UEFA said that this 'coincidence' was not their responsibility because the name was selected by fan voting.

=== Official songs ===
The competition's official opening song was "This One's for You" by David Guetta featuring Zara Larsson, and the official closing song was "Free Your Mind" by Maya Lavelle. It was reported that David Guetta sought one million fans to add their voices to the official anthem via a website.

=== Sponsorship ===
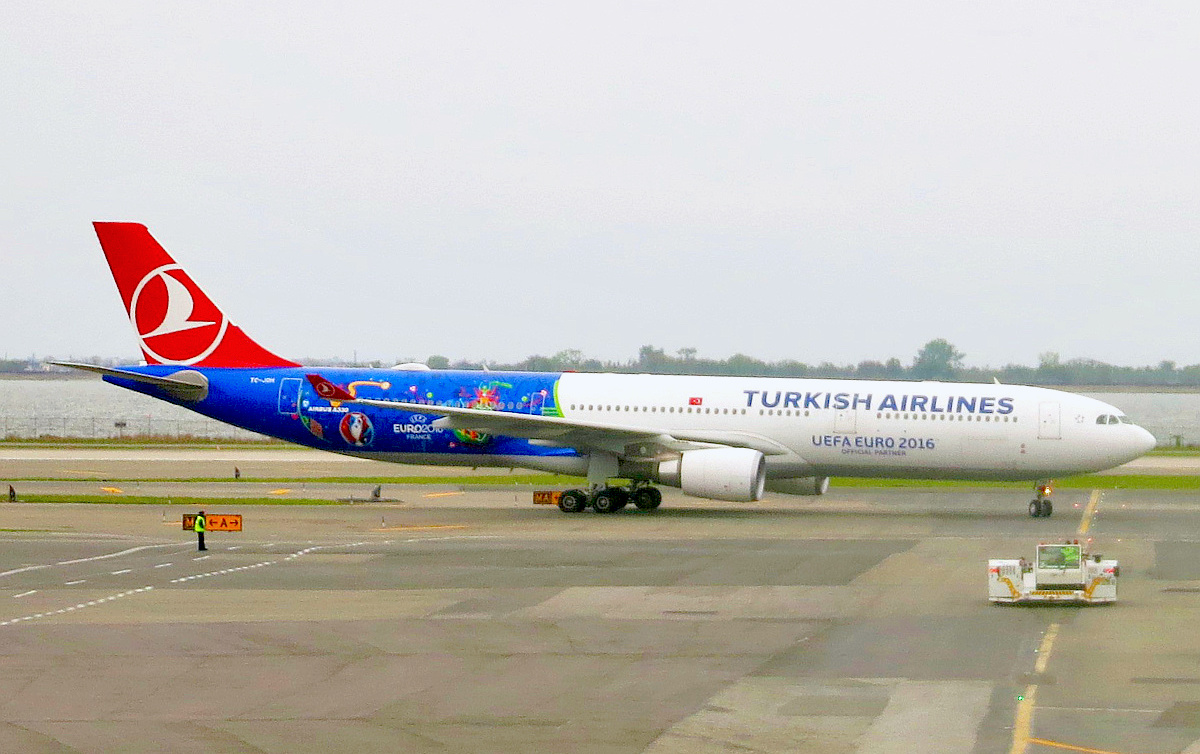
Turkish Airlines aeroplane, decorated with UEFA EURO 2016 emblems.

Global sponsors	National sponsors
Adidas; Carlsberg; Coca-Cola; Continental; Hisense; Hyundai–Kia; McDonald's; Orange; SOCAR; Turkish Airlines	Abritel–HomeAway; Crédit Agricole; Française des Jeux; La Poste; PROMAN; SNCF

Because France's Évin Law prohibits alcohol advertising on television, Carlsberg's pitchside hoardings did not name the brand, using alibi marketing by instead reading "Probably" and "…the best in the world" to reference its widely known slogan "probably the best lager in the world".

== Broadcasting ==
The International Broadcast Centre (IBC) was located at the Paris expo Porte de Versailles in Paris' 15th arrondissement.
