= Évin Law =

1991 French alcohol and tobacco policy law, named after Claude Évin

The loi Évin ([lwa e.vɛ̃]; formally: "loi n^{o} 91-32 du 10 janvier 1991 relative à la lutte contre le tabagisme et l'alcoolisme", Law 91-32 of 10 January 1991 relative to the struggle against tobacco consumption and alcoholism) is the French alcohol and tobacco policy law passed in 1991. It takes its name from Claude Évin, then Minister of Health, who proposed it to Parliament.

== Origins ==
Before the law, French advertising laws discriminated against non-French producers. However, Scotch whisky producers challenged France in the European Court of Justice and won. France was condemned and required to change the law in 1980 but did not produce satisfactory legislation until 1991, with the enactment of Loi Evin, which affected both alcohol and tobacco policies.

== Provisions ==
The provisions of the law reinforce the restrictions placed on tobacco and alcohol and their advertising by its predecessor Loi Veil (1976).

=== Alcohol ===
Alcohol advertisements are prohibited on television or in cinemas. The law requires strict control over messages and images and the inclusion in all advertisements of a message to the effect that alcohol abuse is dangerous to one's health.

=== Tobacco ===
According to the law, all packets of cigarettes must display a health warning, and a limit is imposed on the tar content of cigarettes.

The law also forbids smoking in all enclosed places accessible to the public, including workplaces, public transportation, cafés, and restaurants, except in areas specifically designated for smokers. The precise conditions for opening smoking areas were left to secondary legislation enacted by the executive; the rules changed over time.

Initially, the rules for smoking areas were rather permissive and were laxly enforced. Restaurants, cafés etc. just had to provide smoking and non-smoking sections, which were often not well separated. In larger establishments, smoking and non-smoking sections could be separate rooms but often they were just areas within the same room.

On 1 February 2007, the rules were tightened. Smoking is now banned in all public places (stations, museums, etc.); an exception exists for special smoking rooms fulfilling strict conditions. However, a special exemption was made for cafés and restaurants, clubs, casinos, bars, etc., until 1 January 2008, although the French government allowed a day of reflection on New Year's Day. Opinion polls suggest 70% of people support the ban.

Under the new regulations, smoking rooms are allowed but are subjected to very strict conditions: they may occupy no more than 20% of the total floor space of the establishment and their size may not be more than 35 m². They need to be equipped with separate ventilation that replaces the full volume of air ten times per hour; the air pressure of the smoking room must constantly be lower than the pressure in the contiguous rooms; they must have doors that close automatically; no service can be provided in the smoking rooms and cleaning and maintenance personnel may enter the room only one hour after it was last used for smoking.

A legal challenge against the new regulations was filed before the Conseil d'État in 2007, but it was rejected.

=== Tobacco advertising ===
The Loi Evin forbids any favourable advertising of tobacco, including on billboards and prohibits the free or promotional distribution of cigarettes. Tobacco advertising is also forbidden at sporting events, and televised coverage of foreign sporting events must make every attempt to hide similar sponsorship advertising that may be present.

=== Information on contents of cigarette packets ===
According to the law, cigarette packets must display the tar, nicotine and carbon monoxide content. They must also display a health warning covering no less than 30% of the packaging.

The sale of cigarettes is illegal to those under 16. That must be displayed clearly in all places that sell tobacco.

== Consequences ==
=== Restaurants, bars, hotels and casinos ===
- The patron of the establishment must affix a sign at the entrance of the premises notifying entrants of the restrictions on smoking and arrange any necessary refurbishment to ensure complete separation and protection of nonsmokers from fumes.
- An establishment may not be set aside for smokers.

=== Schools ===
- It is forbidden to smoke anywhere on the premises, inside or outside, in individual offices or in the cafeteria.
- No areas should be set aside as smoking areas, either for students, teaching staff or visitors.

=== Universities and adult training centres ===
- It is illegal to smoke anywhere inside onsite, in individual offices or the cafeteria.
- Smoking areas must be outside the site.

=== Public transport ===
- The ban on smoking includes all forms of public transport such as buses, trains, planes, and boats.
- One may not smoke in taxis or cars that are not privately owned.

=== Hospitals ===
- It is forbidden to smoke in all covered and closed areas. Only outside areas may be reserved for smokers.

=== Sport ===
- Sport competitions cannot contain alcohol brands in their names. For example, the rugby union Heineken Cup was known as the H Cup in France, while the Guinness Six Nations is just called the Six Nations, with the slogan Six Nations Greatness hinting at sponsors Guinness.

== See also ==
- Alcohol advertising

== Sources ==
- Text of the law on Légifrance
- fr:Loi Evin
