= UEFA Euro 1988 final =

Final game of the UEFA Euro 1988

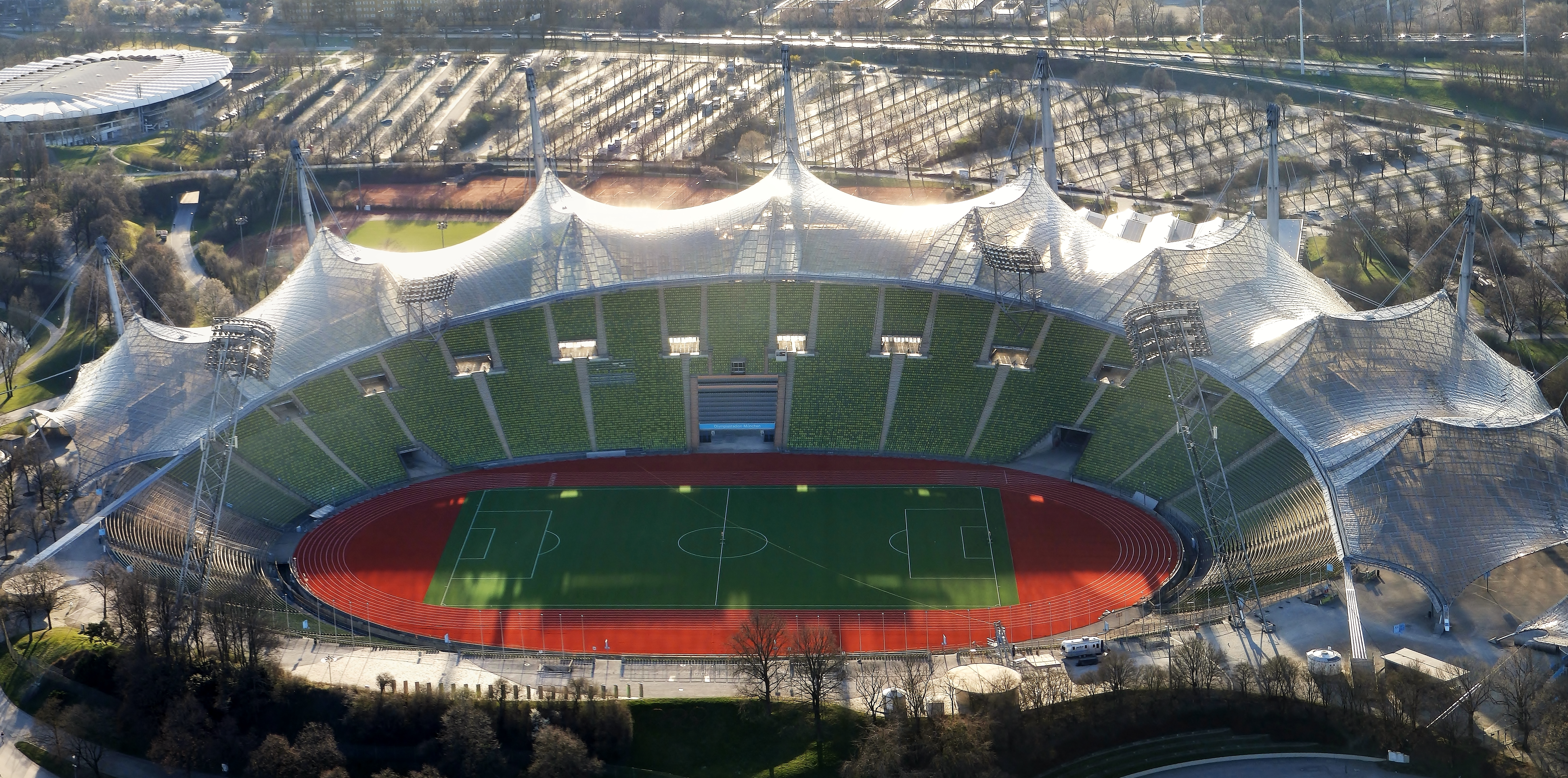
- The match took place at the Olympiastadion (pictured in 2014) in Munich.
- Event: UEFA Euro 1988
Soviet Union	Netherlands
0	2
- Date: 25 June 1988
- Venue: Olympiastadion, Munich
- Referee: Michel Vautrot (France)
- Attendance: 62,770

The UEFA Euro 1988 final was the final match of UEFA Euro 1988, the eighth European Championship, UEFA's top football competition for national teams. The match was played at the Olympiastadion in Munich, Germany, on 25 June 1988, and was contested between the Netherlands and the Soviet Union.

The two finalists had both been drawn into Group 2 of the tournament, alongside the Republic of Ireland and England. The Soviet Union finished on top of the group before defeating Italy in the semi-finals to qualify for their fourth European Championship final. Meanwhile, the Netherlands ended the group stage in second place, before beating host nation West Germany in the semi-finals to progress to their first European Championship final.

The final was played in front of 72,308 spectators, and was refereed by Michel Vautrot from France. The Netherlands won the match 2–0 to secure their first European Championship title.

== Background ==
UEFA Euro 1988 was the eighth edition of the UEFA European Football Championship, UEFA's football competition for national teams. Qualifying rounds were played on a home-and-away round-robin tournament basis prior to the final tournament taking place in West Germany, between 10 and 25 June 1988. There, the eight qualified teams were divided into two groups of four with each team playing one another once. The winners of each group then faced the runners-up from the other group in the semi-finals, the winners progressing to the final.

In the previous international football tournament, the 1986 FIFA World Cup, the Soviet Union were eliminated by Belgium in the second round, losing 4–3 after extra time, despite Igor Belanov's hat-trick. The Netherlands were knocked out in the UEFA play-off match after drawing 2–2 on aggregate with Belgium but losing on away goals. The UEFA Euro 1988 Final was the fourth meeting between the sides, and came just 13 days after they met one another in the group stage.

== Route to the final ==
=== Soviet Union ===
The Soviet Union qualified for the UEFA Euro 1988 final tournament as champions of qualifying group 3 where they faced East Germany, France, Iceland and Norway in a home-and-away round-robin tournament. They remained unbeaten throughout their eight games, winning five and drawing the remainder, to finish top of the group, two points ahead of East Germany. In UEFA Euro 1988 Group 2, the Soviet Union's opponents were the Netherlands, the Republic of Ireland and England.

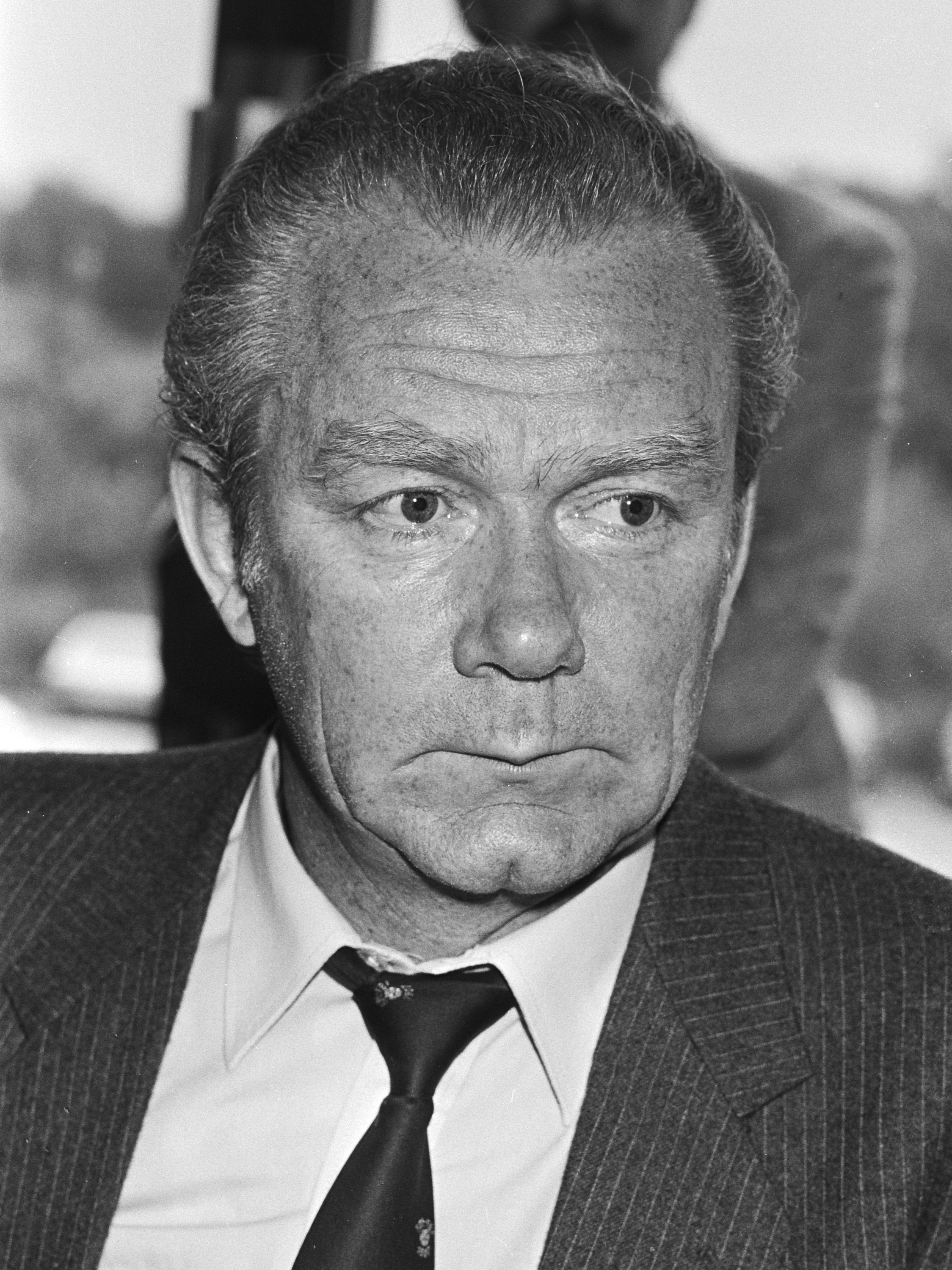
Valeriy Lobanovskyi (pictured in 1985) was the Soviet Union manager for UEFA Euro 1988.

In their initial group match, the Soviet Union faced the Netherlands for the first time in a competitive fixture. The game was played on 12 June 1988 at the Müngersdorfer Stadion in Cologne in front of 54,336 people. Valeriy Lobanovskyi, the manager, remarked before the match, "it's wise not to attack at all costs ... it's more important to win." His side adopted a defensive approach to the match and the first half ended goalless: Rinat Dasayev, the Soviet Union goalkeeper, pushed two shots from Ronald Koeman over the crossbar and saved other attempts to score from Ruud Gullit, John van 't Schip, John Bosman, Jan Wouters and a potential own goal from Volodymyr Bezsonov. Belanov's shot early in the second half was kept out by the Netherlands goalkeeper Hans van Breukelen, but in the 53rd minute, Vasyl Rats played a one-two with Belanov before striking the ball past Van Breukelen to give the Soviet Union the lead. Although Marco van Basten was then brought on, the Netherlands' best chance to equalise came when Vagiz Khidiyatullin deflected a header from Gullit onto his own crossbar, and the match ended 1–0 to the Soviet Union.

The Soviet Union played their second group game against the Republic of Ireland at the Niedersachsenstadion in Hanover on 15 June 1988. The Republic of Ireland dominated the first half, with Kevin Sheedy and Ronnie Whelan controlling the midfield. Ray Houghton's strike from a Mick McCarthy off-target shot drew a save from Dasayev. The Soviet Union goalkeeper then denied Houghton at full stretch after the Republic of Ireland player had beaten three defenders before shooting. Seven minutes before half-time, the Republic of Ireland took the lead: McCarthy took a long throw-in which found Whelan who volleyed it into the top corner of the Soviet Union goal from the edge of the penalty area. Dasayev then tackled Tony Galvin, injuring himself, and the referee declined to award a penalty. Minutes later the pair collided again, John Aldridge struck the ball over the crossbar and Dasayev was substituted for Viktor Chanov. With 15 minutes remaining, Belanov's pass over Kevin Moran found Oleh Protasov who struck the ball past Packie Bonner's legs to equalise. Bonner made a late save from Belanov and the match ended 1–1.

In their final group match, the Soviet Union faced England on 18 June 1988 at the Waldstadion in Frankfurt. After just three minutes, Sergei Aleinikov dispossessed Glenn Hoddle before running past Dave Watson in the England penalty area and striking the ball past Chris Woods, the England goalkeeper, to give the Soviet Union the lead. Protasov then shot wide before hitting another strike against the England goalpost. In the 16th minute, Tony Adams equalised with a header from a Hoddle free kick. Trevor Steven then hit the bar after heading the ball into the ground before a cross from Rats was headed into the England goal by Oleksiy Mykhaylychenko to give the Soviet Union a 2–1 lead at the interval. With 18 minutes remaining, Viktor Pasulko scored from another Rats cross to make it 3–1, which was the final score.

Ending the group stage top of the table, the Soviet Union progressed to the semi-finals where they faced Italy. The match was played at the Neckarstadion in Stuttgart on 22 June 1988 in front of 61,606 spectators. Walter Zenga, the Italy goalkeeper, made early saves from both Aleinikov and Hennadiy Lytovchenko while Protasov's shot flew just over the Italy crossbar. Gianluca Vialli then missed with a shot before he headed wide from a Roberto Donadoni cross. Giuseppe Giannini's header from Roberto Mancini's free kick was saved by Dasayev and the first half ended 0–0. Substantial rain fell in the early stages of the second half and, according to the Italy manager Azeglio Vicini, "we were technical and fast, but they were more powerful. On that pitch, it made all the difference." Around the hour mark, Oleh Kuznetsov passed to Mykhaylychenko who supplied the ball to Lytovchenko. His shot was blocked by Franco Baresi but Lytovchenko struck the rebound into the corner of the goal to give the Soviet Union the lead. Four minutes later, Oleksandr Zavarov passed to Protasov who hit a measured shot over Zenga to double the Soviet Union's lead. They had further chances to extend their lead but the match ended 2–0 and the Soviet Union progressed to their fourth European Championship final.

=== Netherlands ===
The Netherlands progressed to the final tournament of UEFA 1988 after finishing top of qualifying group 5, finishing unbeaten in the group which comprised Greece, Hungary, Poland and Cyprus. The Netherlands won six and drew two of their eight games and ended the qualification phase five points ahead of Greece. They were also drawn into UEFA Euro 1988 Group 2 alongside the Soviet Union, the Republic of Ireland and England.

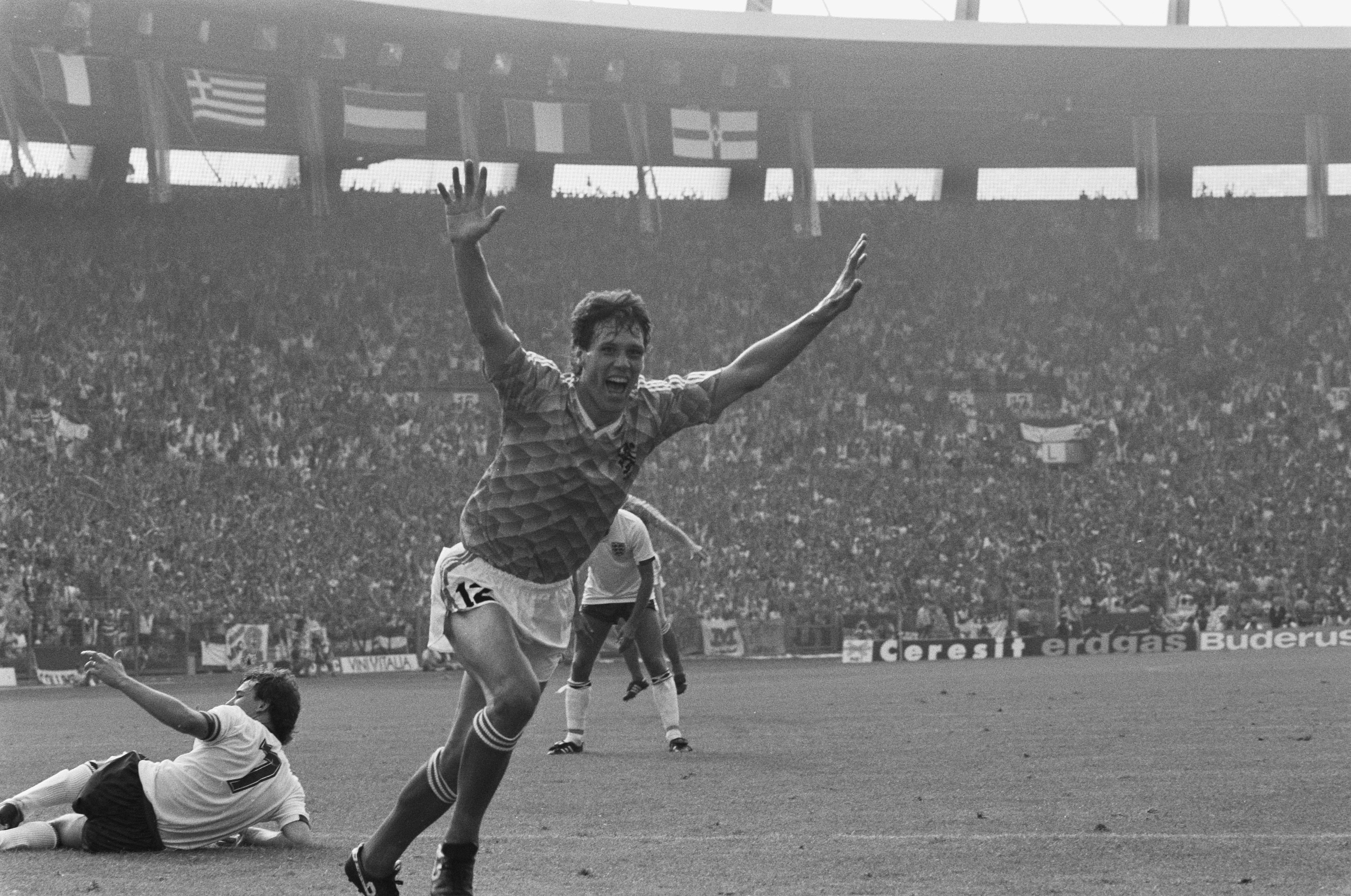
Marco van Basten celebrates scoring a hat-trick against England

Their first game was against the Soviet Union which they lost 1–0 with Rats scoring in the 57th minute. The second group game saw the Netherlands face England, with the match taking place on 15 June 1988 at the Rheinstadion in Düsseldorf in front of 63,940 spectators in what author Jonathan O'Brien described as "the best match of the tournament". England struck the frame of the Netherlands' goal twice in the first half. Firstly Gary Lineker hit the post after running clear of the Netherlands' defenders after a pass from Bryan Robson, before Hoddle's free-kick hit the inside of the post. A minute before half-time, Van Basten, who had been restored to the starting line-up, received a pass from Gullit before turning past Adams and shooting beyond Peter Shilton, the England goalkeeper. With seconds left before the interval, Van Basten took the ball round Shilton but his shot was cleared by Steven. Nine minutes into the second half, England equalised: Robson played a one-two with Lineker before scoring past Van Breukelen. With less than 20 minutes remaining, Gullit passed to Van Basten who controlled the ball before striking it across Shilton to make it 2–1 to the Netherlands. Soon after, Wim Kieft's flick-on from Erwin Koeman's corner was met by Van Basten who scored to complete his hat-trick and give the Netherlands a 3–1 victory.

The Netherlands' final group match was against the Republic of Ireland and was played on 18 June 1988 at the Parkstadion in Gelsenkirchen. The early stages were controlled by the Netherlands, with Bonner being forced to save a strike from Adri van Tiggelen, Erwin Koeman headed wide, McCarthy's tackle denied Van Basten and Ronald Koeman missed an open goal. In the 16th minute, Paul McGrath's header from a corner hit the post before rebounding off Gerald Vanenburg and striking the post again: as Aldridge tried to tap it in, Van Breukelen fell on the ball and gathered it. After half-time, Wouters hit the Republic of Ireland crossbar but in the 83rd minute, the Netherlands took the lead. Wouters' cross was headed out by McGrath and the ball fell to Ronald Koeman who struck the ball goalward but into the ground from around 25 yards (23 m). Kieft turned and diverted the ball past Bonner with his forehead and secured a 1–0 win for the Netherlands, who finished Group 2 in second place, one point behind the Soviet Union.

In the semi-finals, the Netherlands opponents were West Germany, with the match being played at the Volksparkstadion in Hamburg on 21 June 1988. There were few chances to score for either side in the first half, with Frank Mill's opportunist attempt to intercept Ronald Koeman's backpass being gathered by Van Breukelen. Ten minutes into the second half, West Germany took the lead. Jürgen Klinsmann took the ball past Van Tiggelen and Erwin Koeman before falling under a tackle from Frank Rijkaard inside the Netherlands penalty area. The referee deemed it to be a foul and Lothar Matthäus scored the resulting penalty. With 15 minutes remaining, Van Basten ran into the West Germany box and was tackled by Jürgen Kohler and was awarded the second penalty of the match. Ronald Koeman scored, striking it left as the West Germany goalkeeper Eike Immel dived right. Second-half substitute Pierre Littbarski then saw his inswinging corner cleared off the line by Vanenburg. With less than two minutes remaining, the Netherlands took the lead in what O'Brien describes as "the most cherished moment in their footballing history." Wouters crossed the ball to Van Basten, who outran Kohler, close to the edge of the 18 yard box on the right side of the goal, Van Basten caught the cross on a half volley, looping it over a diving Immel, into the side netting on the left end of the net. With a 2–1 victory, the Netherlands qualified for their first UEFA European Championship final.

=== Summary ===
Soviet Union
Round
Netherlands
Opponent
Result
Group stage
Opponent
Result
Netherlands
1–0
Match 1
Soviet Union
0–1
Republic of Ireland
1–1
Match 2
England
3–1
England
3–1
Match 3
Republic of Ireland
1–0
Group 2 winners

Pos	Team	Pld	Pts
1	Soviet Union	3	5
2	Netherlands	3	4
3	Republic of Ireland	3	3
4	England	3	0

Source: UEFA
Final standings
Group 2 runners-up

Pos	Team	Pld	Pts
1	Soviet Union	3	5
2	Netherlands	3	4
3	Republic of Ireland	3	3
4	England	3	0

Source: UEFA
Opponent
Result
Knockout stage
Opponent
Result
Italy
2–0
Semi-finals
West Germany
2–1

== Match ==
=== Pre-match ===
Kuznetsov was unavailable for the Soviet Union as a result of his suspension, while Belanov was restored to the starting line-up having recovered from injury. The Netherlands named a team unchanged from their semi-final against West Germany.

=== Summary ===
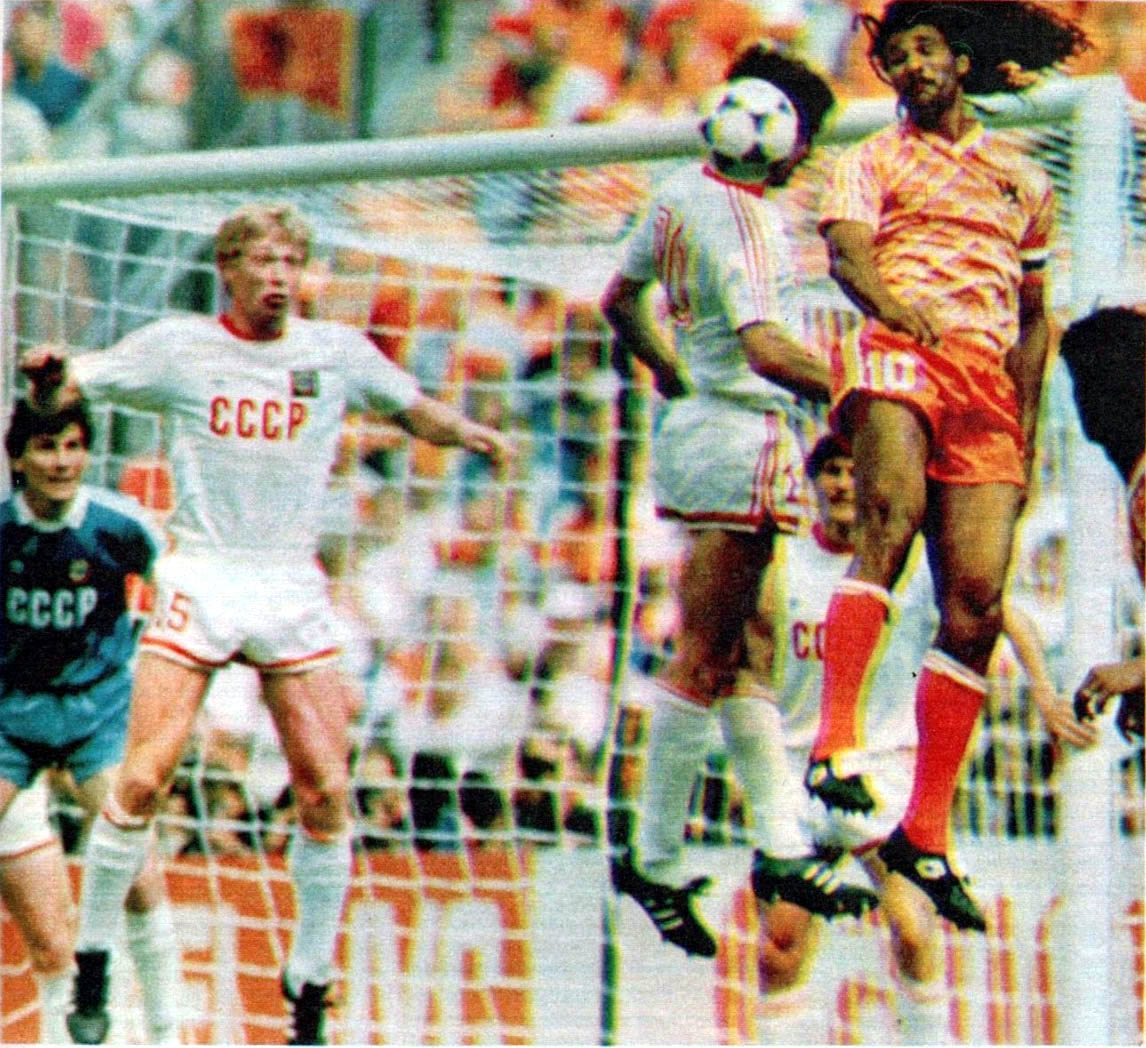
Ruud Gullit heads while being marked by Oleg Protassov. Behind them, goalkeeper Rinat Dasayev and Oleksiy Mykhaylychenko

The final took place at the Olympiastadion in Munich on 25 June 1988 in front of 72,308 spectators and was refereed by Michel Vautrot from France. The first chance of the match fell to Lytovchenko in the second minute, but his shot was wide. In the 30th minute, he missed another opportunity: Zavarov passed the ball 50 yards (46 m) to Belanov, who evaded Van Tiggelen and Berry van Aerle before passing to Lytovchenko. He ran past Rijkaard but his shot was straight at Van Breukelen in the Netherlands goal. Three minutes later, the Netherlands took the lead. Dasayev conceded a corner when he punched Gullit's free kick over the crossbar and although Erwin Koeman's set piece was headed away, he passed the ball into the box, Van Basten nodded it on and Gullit scored with a header. Before half-time, the ball fell to Belanov after a mix-up in the Netherlands penalty area, but his shot went over the crossbar.

Eight minutes into the second half, the Netherlands doubled their lead with what UEFA later called "perhaps the most iconic goal in UEFA European Championship history". Van Tiggelen dispossessed Lytovchenko and passed to Arnold Mühren who was making an overlapping run down the left wing. He played in a high cross to the far side of the box to Van Basten who struck the ball on the volley from a tight angle. It dipped under the crossbar to make it 2–0. Anatoliy Demyanenko's free kick then eventually found Belanov but his shot struck the post, before the Netherlands conceded a penalty. A failed clearance from Erwin Koeman was headed by Protasov and Sergey Gotsmanov kept the ball in play before being fouled by Van Breukelen. Belanov took the penalty kick but Van Breukelen dived the right way and the ball struck his knee. The match ended 2–0 and the Netherlands won their first UEFA European Championship title.

=== Details ===
25 June 1988
15:30 CEST

Soviet Union	0–2	Netherlands
	Report	Gullit 32'; Van Basten 53'

Olympiastadion, Munich
Attendance: 62,770
Referee: Michel Vautrot (France)

Soviet Union	Netherlands

GK	1	Rinat Dasayev (c)
RB	5	Anatoliy Demyanenko
CB	7	Sergei Aleinikov
CB	3	Vagiz Khidiyatullin	(yellow card) 42'
LB	6	Vasyl Rats
RM	8	Hennadiy Lytovchenko	(yellow card) 34'
CM	9	Oleksandr Zavarov
CM	15	Oleksiy Mykhaylychenko
LM	18	Sergey Gotsmanov		(substituted off) 68'
CF	10	Oleh Protasov		(substituted off) 71'
CF	11	Igor Belanov (yellow card) 31'
Substitutes:
DF	19	Sergei Baltacha		(substituted on) 67'
MF	20	Viktor Pasulko		(substituted on) 71'
Manager:
Valeriy Lobanovskyi

GK	1	Hans van Breukelen
RB	6	Berry van Aerle	(yellow card) 48'
CB	17	Frank Rijkaard
CB	4	Ronald Koeman
LB	2	Adri van Tiggelen
RM	7	Gerald Vanenburg
CM	20	Jan Wouters	(yellow card) 37'
CM	8	Arnold Mühren
LM	13	Erwin Koeman
CF	10	Ruud Gullit (c)
CF	12	Marco van Basten
Manager:
Rinus Michels

Linesmen:
Gérard Biguet (France)
Rémi Harrel (France)
Reserve referee:
Michał Listkiewicz (Poland)

== Post-match ==
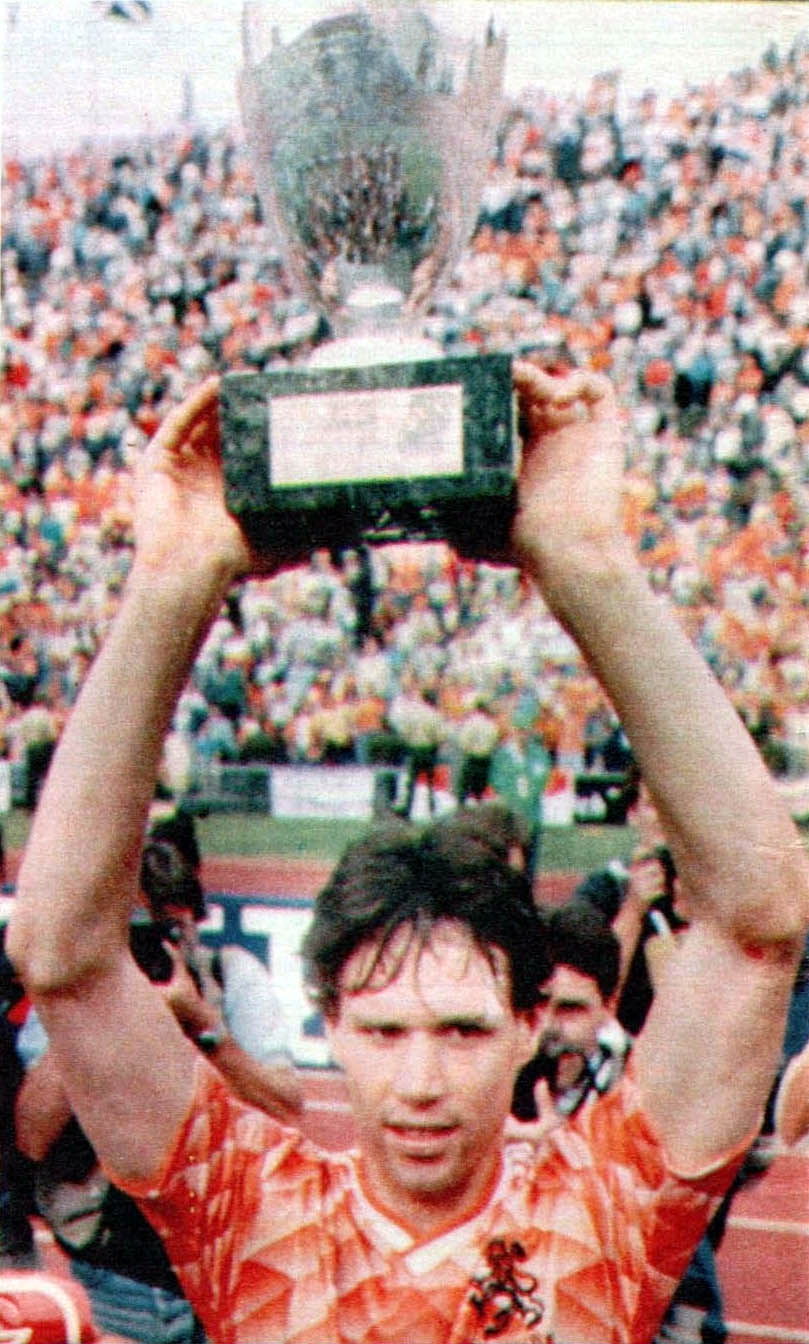
Marco van Basten raising the trophy

In reference to his second half goal, Van Basten said that he had begun to tire and had decided that he needed to "take a risk and shoot."

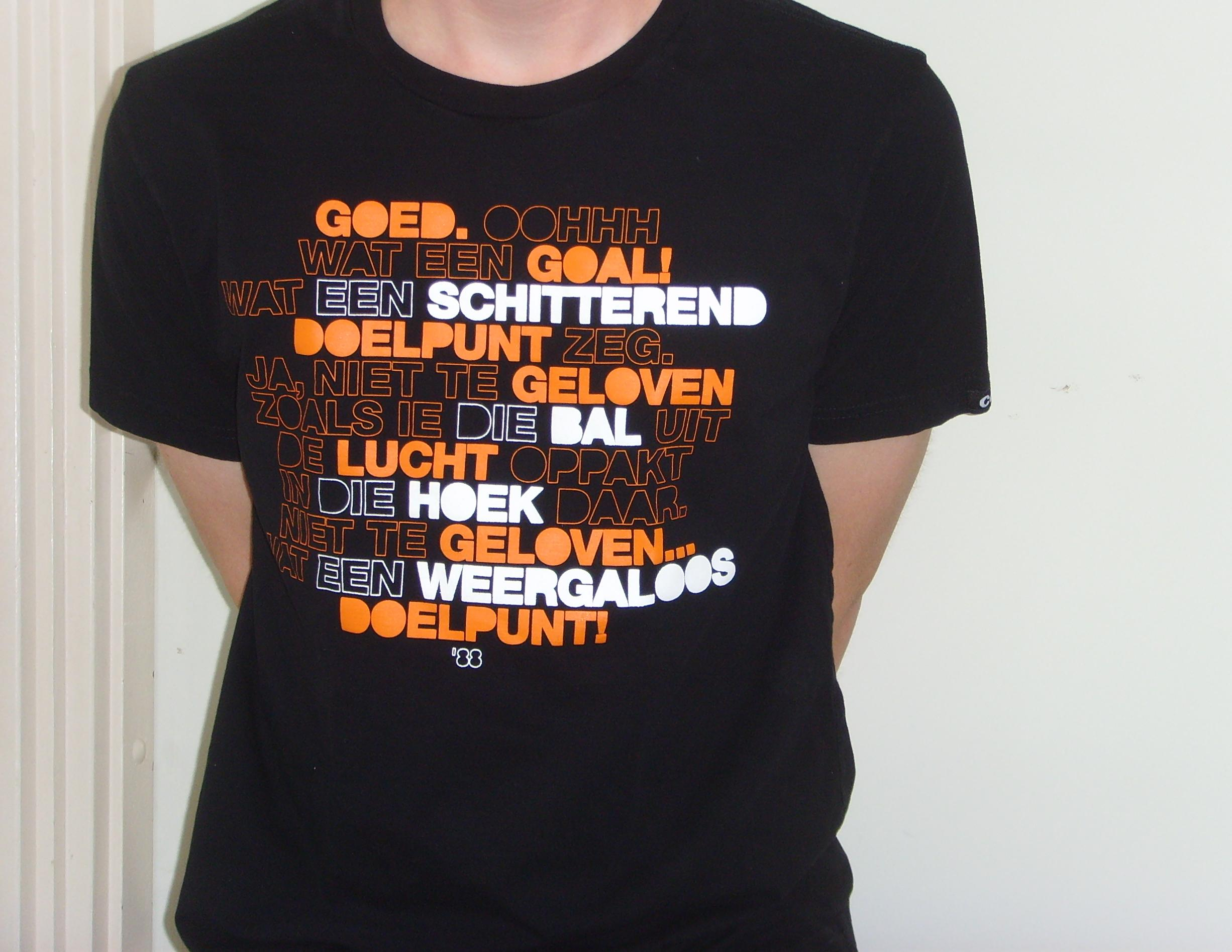
T-shirt with the Dutch TV commentary on Marco van Basten's goal, which is considered one of the highlights of national football in the Netherlands

He continued: "I can tell a lot of stories, but it was just a fantastic feeling." His manager Rinus Michels described it as "a goal more beautiful than the most ambitious script". Gullit said of Van Basten's goal, "If he hit it a million times, he would never ever score that goal again" while Wouters recalled "When we celebrated, I asked him: 'How could you shoot from there?' He answered: 'I just don’t know.'" Dutch newspaper De Telegraaf described the goal as "unstoppable" and that "the most beautiful Euro goal was born".

In the next international tournament, the 1990 FIFA World Cup, the Netherlands were defeated in the second round by eventual winners West Germany. The Soviet Union failed to progress beyond the group stage, losing to both Romania and Argentina, which would become the Soviet Union's last major tournament before its dissolution.

== See also ==
- Netherlands at the UEFA European Championship
- Soviet Union at the UEFA European Championship
