= UEFA Euro 1988 knockout stage =

International football tournament stage

The knockout stage of UEFA Euro 1988 was a single-elimination tournament involving the four teams that qualified from the group stage of the tournament. There were two rounds of matches: a semi-final stage leading to the final to decide the champions. The knockout stage began with the semi-finals on 21 June and ended with the final on 25 June 1988 at the Olympiastadion in Munich. The Netherlands won the tournament with a 2–0 victory over the Soviet Union.

All times Central European Summer Time (UTC+2)

== Format ==
Any game in the knockout stage that was undecided by the end of the regular 90 minutes was followed by thirty minutes of extra time (two 15-minute halves). If scores were still level after 30 minutes of extra time, there would be a penalty shootout (at least five penalties each, and more if necessary) to determine who progressed to the next round. As with every tournament since UEFA Euro 1984, there was no third place play-off.

== Qualified teams ==
The top two placed teams from each of the two groups qualified for the knockout stage.

Group	Winners	Runners-up
1	West Germany	Italy
2	Soviet Union	Netherlands

== Bracket ==
Semi-finals
22 June – Stuttgart
Soviet Union	2
Italy	0
21 June – Hamburg
West Germany	1
Netherlands	2

Final
25 June – Munich
Soviet Union	0
Netherlands	2

== Semi-finals ==
=== West Germany vs Netherlands ===
21 June 1988
20:15

West Germany	1–2	Netherlands
Matthäus 55' (pen.)	Report	R. Koeman 74' (pen.); Van Basten 88'

Volksparkstadion, Hamburg
Attendance: 56,115
Referee: Ioan Igna (Romania)

West Germany	Netherlands

GK	1	Eike Immel
RB	6	Uli Borowka
CB	5	Matthias Herget	(substituted off) 44'
CB	4	Jürgen Kohler
LB	3	Andreas Brehme
RM	10	Olaf Thon
CM	20	Wolfgang Rolff
CM	8	Lothar Matthäus (c)
LM	11	Frank Mill	(substituted off) 79'
CF	9	Rudi Völler
CF	18	Jürgen Klinsmann
Substitutions:
DF	15	Hans Pflügler	(substituted on) 44'
MF	7	Pierre Littbarski	(substituted on) 79'
Manager:
Franz Beckenbauer

GK	1	Hans van Breukelen	(yellow card) 60'
RB	6	Berry van Aerle
CB	17	Frank Rijkaard
CB	4	Ronald Koeman
LB	2	Adri van Tiggelen
RM	7	Gerald Vanenburg
CM	20	Jan Wouters
CM	8	Arnold Mühren		(substituted off) 58'
LM	13	Erwin Koeman		(substituted off) 89'
CF	12	Marco van Basten
CF	10	Ruud Gullit (c)
Substitutions:
FW	14	Wim Kieft		(substituted on) 58'
DF	18	Wilbert Suvrijn		(substituted on) 89'
Manager:
Rinus Michels

Linesmen:
Ștefan Dan Petrescu (Romania)
Ion Crăciunescu (Romania)

=== Soviet Union vs Italy ===
22 June 1988
20:15

Soviet Union	2–0	Italy
Lytovchenko 58'; Protasov 62'	Report

Neckarstadion, Stuttgart
Attendance: 61,606
Referee: Alexis Ponnet (Belgium)

Soviet Union	Italy

GK	1	Rinat Dasayev (c)
RB	4	Oleh Kuznetsov	(yellow card) 2'
CB	3	Vagiz Khidiyatullin
CB	2	Volodymyr Bezsonov	(yellow card) 32'	(substituted off) 36'
LB	6	Vasyl Rats
RM	9	Oleksandr Zavarov
CM	8	Hennadiy Lytovchenko
CM	18	Sergey Gotsmanov	(yellow card) 44'
CM	7	Sergei Aleinikov
LM	15	Oleksiy Mykhaylychenko
CF	10	Oleh Protasov
Substitutions:
DF	5	Anatoliy Demyanenko		(substituted on) 36'
Manager:
Valeriy Lobanovskyi

GK	1	Walter Zenga
RB	3	Giuseppe Bergomi (c)
CB	6	Riccardo Ferri	(yellow card) 85'
CB	2	Franco Baresi	(yellow card) 33'
LB	8	Paolo Maldini		(substituted off) 65'
RM	17	Roberto Donadoni
CM	9	Carlo Ancelotti
CM	11	Fernando De Napoli	(yellow card) 78'
LM	14	Giuseppe Giannini
CF	18	Roberto Mancini		(substituted off) 46'
CF	20	Gianluca Vialli
Substitutions:
FW	16	Alessandro Altobelli		(substituted on) 46'
DF	10	Luigi De Agostini		(substituted on) 65'
Manager:
Azeglio Vicini

Linesmen:
Frans Van Den Wijngaert (Belgium)
Jean-François Crucke (Belgium)

== Final ==
25 June 1988
15:30

Soviet Union	0–2	Netherlands
	Report	Gullit 32'; Van Basten 53'

Olympiastadion, Munich
Attendance: 62,770
Referee: Michel Vautrot (France)

Soviet Union	Netherlands

GK	1	Rinat Dasayev (c)
RB	5	Anatoliy Demyanenko
CB	7	Sergei Aleinikov
CB	3	Vagiz Khidiyatullin	(yellow card) 42'
LB	6	Vasyl Rats
RM	8	Hennadiy Lytovchenko	(yellow card) 34'
CM	9	Oleksandr Zavarov
CM	15	Oleksiy Mykhaylychenko
LM	18	Sergey Gotsmanov		(substituted off) 68'
CF	10	Oleh Protasov		(substituted off) 71'
CF	11	Igor Belanov (yellow card) 31'
Substitutes:
DF	19	Sergei Baltacha		(substituted on) 67'
MF	20	Viktor Pasulko		(substituted on) 71'
Manager:
Valeriy Lobanovskyi

GK	1	Hans van Breukelen
RB	6	Berry van Aerle	(yellow card) 48'
CB	17	Frank Rijkaard
CB	4	Ronald Koeman
LB	2	Adri van Tiggelen
RM	7	Gerald Vanenburg
CM	20	Jan Wouters	(yellow card) 37'
CM	8	Arnold Mühren
LM	13	Erwin Koeman
CF	10	Ruud Gullit (c)
CF	12	Marco van Basten
Manager:
Rinus Michels

Linesmen:
Gérard Biguet (France)
Rémi Harrel (France)
Reserve referee:
Michał Listkiewicz (Poland)
