= UEFA Euro 1988 Group 2 =

Football tournament group stage

Group 2 of UEFA Euro 1988 contained the Soviet Union, the Netherlands, the Republic of Ireland, and England. Matches were played from 12 to 18 June 1988.

England lost all three games.

== Teams ==
Team	Method of qualification	Date of qualification	Finals appearance	Last appearance	Previous best performance
England	Group 4 winner	11 November 1987	3rd	1980	Third place (1968)
Netherlands	Group 5 winner	9 December 1987	3rd	1980	Third place (1976)
Republic of Ireland	Group 7 winner	11 November 1987	1st	—	Debut
Soviet Union	Group 3 winner	28 October 1987	5th	1972	Winners (1960)

== Standings ==
Pos	Team	Pld	W	D	L	GF	GA	GD	Pts	Qualification
1	Soviet Union	3	2	1	0	5	2	+3	5	Advance to knockout stage
2	Netherlands	3	2	0	1	4	2	+2	4	Advance to knockout stage
3	Republic of Ireland	3	1	1	1	2	2	0	3	
4	England	3	0	0	3	2	7	−5	0	

Source: UEFA
Rules for classification: Group stage tiebreakers

In the semi-finals,

- The winner of Group 2, Soviet Union, advanced to play the runner-up of Group 1, Italy.
- The runner-up of Group 2, Netherlands, advanced to play the winner of Group 1, West Germany.

== Matches ==
=== England vs Republic of Ireland ===
12 June 1988
15:30

England	0–1	Republic of Ireland
	Report	Houghton 6'

Neckarstadion, Stuttgart
Attendance: 51,373
Referee: Siegfried Kirschen (East Germany)

England	Republic of Ireland

GK	1	Peter Shilton
RB	2	Gary Stevens
CB	6	Tony Adams
CB	19	Mark Wright
LB	3	Kenny Sansom
RM	12	Chris Waddle
CM	4	Neil Webb	(substituted off) 60'
CM	7	Bryan Robson (c)
LM	11	John Barnes
CF	9	Peter Beardsley	(substituted off) 82'
CF	10	Gary Lineker
Substitutions:
MF	17	Glenn Hoddle	(substituted on) 60'
FW	18	Mark Hateley	(substituted on) 82'
Manager:
Bobby Robson

GK	1	Packie Bonner
RB	2	Chris Morris
CB	4	Mick McCarthy
CB	5	Kevin Moran
LB	3	Chris Hughton
RM	8	Ray Houghton
CM	7	Paul McGrath
CM	6	Ronnie Whelan
LM	11	Tony Galvin	(substituted off) 77'
CF	9	John Aldridge
CF	10	Frank Stapleton (c)	(substituted off) 62'
Substitutions:
FW	20	Niall Quinn	(substituted on) 62'
MF	15	Kevin Sheedy	(substituted on) 77'
Manager:
(England) Jack Charlton

Linesmen:
Klaus Peschel (East Germany)
Manfred Roßner (East Germany)

=== Netherlands vs Soviet Union ===
12 June 1988
20:15

Netherlands	0–1	Soviet Union
	Report	Rats 52'

Müngersdorfer Stadion, Cologne
Attendance: 54,336
Referee: Dieter Pauly (West Germany)

Netherlands	Soviet Union

GK	1	Hans van Breukelen
SW	4	Ronald Koeman
CB	6	Berry van Aerle
CB	17	Frank Rijkaard
CB	2	Adri van Tiggelen
RM	7	Gerald Vanenburg	(substituted off) 59'
CM	20	Jan Wouters
CM	8	Arnold Mühren
LM	11	John van 't Schip
CF	10	Ruud Gullit (c)
CF	9	John Bosman
Substitutions:
FW	12	Marco van Basten	(substituted on) 59'
Manager:
Rinus Michels

GK	1	Rinat Dasayev (c)
SW	3	Vagiz Khidiyatullin	(yellow card) 40'
CB	2	Volodymyr Bezsonov
CB	4	Oleh Kuznetsov
CB	5	Anatoliy Demyanenko
RM	9	Oleksandr Zavarov		(substituted off) 90'
CM	15	Oleksiy Mykhaylychenko
CM	8	Hennadiy Lytovchenko	(yellow card) 21'
LM	6	Vasyl Rats
CF	11	Igor Belanov		(substituted off) 82'
CF	10	Oleh Protasov
Substitutions:
FW	7	Sergei Aleinikov		(substituted on) 82'
DF	13	Tengiz Sulakvelidze		(substituted on) 90'
Manager:
Valeriy Lobanovskyi

Linesmen:
Karl-Heinz Tritschler (West Germany)
Aron Schmidhuber (West Germany)

=== England vs Netherlands ===
15 June 1988
17:15

England	1–3	Netherlands
Robson 53'	Report	Van Basten 44', 71', 75'

Rheinstadion, Düsseldorf
Attendance: 63,940
Referee: Paolo Casarin (Italy)

England	Netherlands

GK	1	Peter Shilton
RB	2	Gary Stevens
CB	6	Tony Adams
CB	19	Mark Wright
LB	3	Kenny Sansom
RM	8	Trevor Steven	(substituted off) 68'
CM	7	Bryan Robson (c)
CM	17	Glenn Hoddle
LM	11	John Barnes
CF	9	Peter Beardsley	(substituted off) 72'
CF	10	Gary Lineker
Substitutions:
MF	12	Chris Waddle	(substituted on) 68'
FW	18	Mark Hateley	(substituted on) 72'
Manager:
Bobby Robson

GK	1	Hans van Breukelen
SW	4	Ronald Koeman
CB	6	Berry van Aerle
CB	17	Frank Rijkaard
CB	2	Adri van Tiggelen
RM	7	Gerald Vanenburg	(substituted off) 60'
CM	20	Jan Wouters
CM	8	Arnold Mühren
LM	13	Erwin Koeman
CF	10	Ruud Gullit (c)
CF	12	Marco van Basten	(substituted off) 87'
Substitutions:
FW	14	Wim Kieft	(substituted on) 60'
DF	18	Wilbert Suvrijn	(substituted on) 87'
Manager:
Rinus Michels

Linesmen:
Carlo Longhi (Italy)
Pierluigi Magni (Italy)

=== Republic of Ireland vs Soviet Union ===
15 June 1988
20:15

Republic of Ireland	1–1	Soviet Union
Whelan 38'	Report	Protasov 74'

Niedersachsenstadion, Hanover
Attendance: 38,308
Referee: Emilio Soriano Aladrén (Spain)

Republic of Ireland	Soviet Union

GK	1	Packie Bonner
RB	2	Chris Morris
CB	4	Mick McCarthy
CB	5	Kevin Moran
LB	3	Chris Hughton
RM	8	Ray Houghton
CM	6	Ronnie Whelan
CM	15	Kevin Sheedy
LM	11	Tony Galvin
CF	10	Frank Stapleton (c)	(substituted off) 80'
CF	9	John Aldridge
Substitutions:
FW	12	Tony Cascarino	(substituted on) 80'
Manager:
(England) Jack Charlton

GK	1	Rinat Dasayev (c)	(substituted off) 68'
SW	3	Vagiz Khidiyatullin
CB	13	Tengiz Sulakvelidze	(substituted off) 46'
CB	4	Oleh Kuznetsov
CB	5	Anatoliy Demyanenko
RM	9	Oleksandr Zavarov
CM	15	Oleksiy Mykhaylychenko
CM	7	Sergei Aleinikov
LM	6	Vasyl Rats
CF	11	Igor Belanov
CF	10	Oleh Protasov
Substitutions:
MF	18	Sergey Gotsmanov	(substituted on) 46'
GK	16	Viktor Chanov	(substituted on) 68'
Manager:
Valeriy Lobanovskyi

Linesmen:
José Donato Pes Pérez (Spain)
José Mauro Socorro González (Spain)

=== England vs Soviet Union ===
18 June 1988
15:30

England	1–3	Soviet Union
Adams 16'	Report	Aleinikov 3'; Mykhaylychenko 28'; Pasulko 73'

Waldstadion, Frankfurt
Attendance: 48,335
Referee: José Rosa dos Santos (Portugal)

England	Soviet Union

GK	13	Chris Woods
RB	2	Gary Stevens
CB	5	Dave Watson
CB	6	Tony Adams
LB	3	Kenny Sansom
RM	8	Trevor Steven
CM	15	Steve McMahon	(substituted off) 54'
CM	7	Bryan Robson (c)
CM	17	Glenn Hoddle
LM	11	John Barnes
CF	10	Gary Lineker	(substituted off) 69'
Substitutions:
MF	4	Neil Webb	(substituted on) 54'
FW	18	Mark Hateley	(substituted on) 69'
Manager:
Bobby Robson

GK	1	Rinat Dasayev (c)
SW	3	Vagiz Khidiyatullin
CB	2	Volodymyr Bezsonov
CB	4	Oleh Kuznetsov
RM	7	Sergei Aleinikov
CM	8	Hennadiy Lytovchenko
CM	9	Oleksandr Zavarov		(substituted off) 85'
CM	15	Oleksiy Mykhaylychenko
LM	6	Vasyl Rats
CF	11	Igor Belanov		(substituted off) 44'
CF	10	Oleh Protasov	(yellow card) 42'
Substitutions:
MF	20	Viktor Pasulko		(substituted on) 44'
MF	18	Sergey Gotsmanov		(substituted on) 85'
Manager:
Valeriy Lobanovskyi

Linesmen:
José Francisco Conceição Silva (Portugal)
Fortunato Alves de Azevedo (Portugal)

=== Republic of Ireland vs Netherlands ===
18 June 1988
15:30

Republic of Ireland	0–1	Netherlands
	Report	Kieft 82'

Parkstadion, Gelsenkirchen
Attendance: 64,731
Referee: Horst Brummeier (Austria)

Republic of Ireland	Netherlands

GK	1	Packie Bonner
RB	2	Chris Morris	(substituted off) 46'
CB	4	Mick McCarthy
CB	5	Kevin Moran
LB	3	Chris Hughton
RM	8	Ray Houghton
CM	7	Paul McGrath
CM	6	Ronnie Whelan
LM	11	Tony Galvin
CF	10	Frank Stapleton (c)	(substituted off) 83'
CF	9	John Aldridge
Substitutions:
MF	15	Kevin Sheedy	(substituted on) 46'
FW	12	Tony Cascarino	(substituted on) 83'
Manager:
(England) Jack Charlton

GK	1	Hans van Breukelen
SW	4	Ronald Koeman
CB	6	Berry van Aerle
CB	17	Frank Rijkaard
CB	2	Adri van Tiggelen
RM	7	Gerald Vanenburg
CM	20	Jan Wouters	(yellow card) 60'
CM	8	Arnold Mühren		(substituted off) 79'
LM	13	Erwin Koeman		(substituted off) 50'
CF	10	Ruud Gullit (c)
CF	12	Marco van Basten
Substitutions:
FW	14	Wim Kieft		(substituted on) 50'
FW	9	John Bosman		(substituted on) 79'
Manager:
Rinus Michels

Linesmen:
Heinz Holzmann (Austria)
Helmut Kohl (Austria)

== See also ==
- England at the UEFA European Championship
- Netherlands at the UEFA European Championship
- Republic of Ireland at the UEFA European Championship
- Soviet Union at the UEFA European Championship
