= UEFA Euro 1988 Group 1 =

Football tournament group stage

Group 1 of UEFA Euro 1988 contained West Germany, Italy, Spain, and Denmark. Matches were played from 10 to 17 June 1988.

== Teams ==
| Team | Method of qualification | Date of qualification | Finals appearance | Last appearance | Previous best performance |
|---|---|---|---|---|---|
| Denmark | Group 6 winner | 14 October 1987 | 3rd | 1984 | Fourth place (1964), Semi-finals (1984) |
| Italy | Group 2 winner | 14 November 1987 | 3rd | 1980 | Winners (1968) |
| Spain | Group 1 winner | 18 December 1987 | 4th | 1984 | Winners (1964) |
| West Germany | Host | 14 March 1985 | 5th | 1984 | Winners (1972, 1980) |

== Standings ==
| Pos | Team | Pld | W | D | L | GF | GA | GD | Pts | Qualification |
|---|---|---|---|---|---|---|---|---|---|---|
| 1 | West Germany (H) | 3 | 2 | 1 | 0 | 5 | 1 | +4 | 5 | Advance to knockout stage |
| 2 | Italy | 3 | 2 | 1 | 0 | 4 | 1 | +3 | 5 | Advance to knockout stage |
| 3 | Spain | 3 | 1 | 0 | 2 | 3 | 5 | −2 | 2 | |
| 4 | Denmark | 3 | 0 | 0 | 3 | 2 | 7 | −5 | 0 | |

Source: UEFA
Rules for classification: Group stage tiebreakers
(H) Hosts

In the semi-finals,

- The winner of Group 1, West Germany, advanced to play the runner-up of Group 2, Netherlands.
- The runner-up of Group 1, Italy, advanced to play the winner of Group 2, Soviet Union.

== Matches ==
=== West Germany vs Italy ===
10 June 1988
20:15

| West Germany | 1–1 | Italy |
|---|---|---|
| Brehme 55' | Report | Mancini 52' |

Rheinstadion, Düsseldorf
Attendance: 62,552
Referee: Keith Hackett (England)

| West Germany | Italy |

| GK | 1 | Eike Immel |
| SW | 5 | Matthias Herget |
| CB | 4 | Jürgen Kohler |
| CB | 2 | Guido Buchwald |
| RM | 14 | Thomas Berthold |
| CM | 7 | Pierre Littbarski |
| CM | 8 | Lothar Matthäus (c) |
| CM | 10 | Olaf Thon |
| LM | 3 | Andreas Brehme | (substituted off) 76' |
| CF | 9 | Rudi Völler | (substituted off) 81' |
| CF | 18 | Jürgen Klinsmann |
Substitutions:
| DF | 6 | Uli Borowka | (substituted on) 76' |
| FW | 16 | Dieter Eckstein | (substituted on) 81' |
Manager:
Franz Beckenbauer

| GK | 1 | Walter Zenga |
| SW | 2 | Franco Baresi |
| RB | 3 | Giuseppe Bergomi (c) |
| CB | 6 | Riccardo Ferri |
| LB | 8 | Paolo Maldini | (yellow card) 6' |
| RM | 17 | Roberto Donadoni |
| CM | 14 | Giuseppe Giannini |
| CM | 9 | Carlo Ancelotti | (yellow card) 57' |
| LM | 11 | Fernando De Napoli | | (substituted off) 86' |
| RF | 18 | Roberto Mancini |
| LF | 20 | Gianluca Vialli | | (substituted off) 89' |
Substitutions:
| CM | 10 | Luigi De Agostini | | (substituted on) 86' |
| LF | 16 | Alessandro Altobelli | | (substituted on) 89' |
Manager:
Azeglio Vicini

Linesmen:
Neil Midgley (England)
Brian Hill (England)
Reserve referee:
Michał Listkiewicz (Poland)

=== Denmark vs Spain ===
11 June 1988
15:30

| Denmark | 2–3 | Spain |
|---|---|---|
| Laudrup 24'; Povlsen 82' | Report | Míchel 5'; Butragueño 53'; Gordillo 66' |

Niedersachsenstadion, Hanover
Attendance: 55,707
Referee: Bep Thomas (Netherlands)

| Denmark | Spain |

| GK | 1 | Troels Rasmussen |
| SW | 4 | Morten Olsen (c) | (substituted off) 64' |
| CB | 3 | Søren Busk |
| CB | 5 | Ivan Nielsen |
| RM | 2 | John Sivebæk |
| CM | 7 | John Helt | (substituted off) 46' |
| CM | 11 | Michael Laudrup |
| CM | 6 | Søren Lerby |
| LM | 9 | Jan Heintze |
| CF | 10 | Preben Elkjær |
| CF | 15 | Flemming Povlsen |
Substitutions:
| MF | 13 | John Jensen | (substituted on) 46' |
| DF | 12 | Lars Olsen | (substituted on) 64' |
Manager:
(West Germany) Sepp Piontek

| GK | 1 | Andoni Zubizarreta |
| RB | 2 | Tomás Reñones | (yellow card) 69' |
| CB | 4 | Genar Andrinúa |
| CB | 8 | Manuel Sanchís |
| LB | 3 | José Antonio Camacho (c) | (yellow card) 45' | (substituted off) 46' |
| RM | 5 | Víctor Muñoz | (yellow card) 48' |
| CM | 20 | Míchel |
| CM | 14 | Ricardo Gallego |
| LM | 11 | Rafael Gordillo | | (substituted off) 85' |
| RF | 9 | Emilio Butragueño |
| LF | 16 | José Mari Bakero |
Substitutions:
| LB | 18 | Miquel Soler | | (substituted on) 46' |
| RM | 19 | Rafael Martín Vázquez | | (substituted on) 85' |
Manager:
Miguel Muñoz

Linesmen:
John Blankenstein (Netherlands)
Jacob van der Niet (Netherlands)
Reserve referee:
Wolf-Günter Wiesel (West Germany)

=== West Germany vs Denmark ===
14 June 1988
17:15

| West Germany | 2–0 | Denmark |
|---|---|---|
| Klinsmann 10'; Thon 85' | Report |

Parkstadion, Gelsenkirchen
Attendance: 64,812
Referee: Bob Valentine (Scotland)

| West Germany | Denmark |

| GK | 1 | Eike Immel |
| SW | 5 | Matthias Herget |
| CB | 4 | Jürgen Kohler |
| CB | 2 | Guido Buchwald | | (substituted off) 33' |
| RM | 20 | Wolfgang Rolff | (yellow card) 81' |
| CM | 7 | Pierre Littbarski |
| CM | 8 | Lothar Matthäus (c) |
| CM | 10 | Olaf Thon |
| LM | 3 | Andreas Brehme |
| CF | 18 | Jürgen Klinsmann |
| CF | 9 | Rudi Völler | | (substituted off) 74' |
Substitutions:
| DF | 6 | Uli Borowka | | (substituted on) 33' |
| FW | 11 | Frank Mill | | (substituted on) 74' |
Manager:
Franz Beckenbauer

| GK | 16 | Peter Schmeichel |
| SW | 12 | Lars Olsen |
| CB | 2 | John Sivebæk |
| CB | 5 | Ivan Nielsen |
| RM | 20 | Kim Vilfort | | (substituted off) 73' |
| CM | 11 | Michael Laudrup | | (substituted off) 62' |
| CM | 4 | Morten Olsen (c) |
| CM | 6 | Søren Lerby |
| LM | 9 | Jan Heintze |
| CF | 10 | Preben Elkjær | (yellow card) 37' |
| CF | 15 | Flemming Povlsen | (yellow card) 84' |
Substitutions:
| FW | 18 | John Eriksen | | (substituted on) 62' |
| MF | 17 | Klaus Berggreen | | (substituted on) 73' |
Manager:
(West Germany) Sepp Piontek

Linesmen:
Kenny Hope (Scotland)
Andrew Waddell (Scotland)
Reserve referee:
Michał Listkiewicz (Poland)

=== Italy vs Spain ===
14 June 1988
20:15

| Italy | 1–0 | Spain |
|---|---|---|
| Vialli 73' | Report |

Waldstadion, Frankfurt
Attendance: 47,506
Referee: Erik Fredriksson (Sweden)

| Italy | Spain |

| GK | 1 | Walter Zenga |
| SW | 2 | Franco Baresi |
| RB | 3 | Giuseppe Bergomi (c) |
| CB | 6 | Riccardo Ferri | (yellow card) 34' |
| LB | 8 | Paolo Maldini |
| RM | 17 | Roberto Donadoni |
| CM | 14 | Giuseppe Giannini |
| CM | 9 | Carlo Ancelotti |
| LM | 11 | Fernando De Napoli |
| RF | 18 | Roberto Mancini | | (substituted off) 69' |
| LF | 20 | Gianluca Vialli | | (substituted off) 88' |
Substitutions:
| RF | 16 | Alessandro Altobelli | | (substituted on) 69' |
| CM | 10 | Luigi De Agostini | | (substituted on) 88' |
Manager:
Azeglio Vicini

| GK | 1 | Andoni Zubizarreta |
| RB | 2 | Tomás Reñones |
| CB | 4 | Genar Andrinúa |
| CB | 8 | Manuel Sanchís |
| LB | 18 | Miquel Soler |
| RM | 5 | Víctor Muñoz |
| CM | 20 | Míchel | (substituted off) 73' |
| CM | 14 | Ricardo Gallego | (substituted off) 68' |
| LM | 11 | Rafael Gordillo (c) |
| RF | 9 | Emilio Butragueño |
| LF | 16 | José Mari Bakero |
Substitutions:
| RM | 19 | Rafael Martín Vázquez | (substituted on) 68' |
| LF | 17 | Txiki Begiristain | (substituted on) 73' |
Manager:
Miguel Muñoz

Linesmen:
Bo Karlsson (Sweden)
Christer Drottz (Sweden)
Reserve referee:
Werner Föckler (West Germany)

=== West Germany vs Spain ===
This match remains the last time that West Germany or a unified Germany team won a competitive match against Spain.

17 June 1988
20:15

| West Germany | 2–0 | Spain |
|---|---|---|
| Völler 29', 51' | Report |

Olympiastadion, Munich
Attendance: 63,802
Referee: Michel Vautrot (France)

| West Germany | Spain |

| GK | 1 | Eike Immel |
| SW | 5 | Matthias Herget | (yellow card) 76' |
| CB | 6 | Uli Borowka |
| CB | 4 | Jürgen Kohler |
| RM | 3 | Andreas Brehme |
| CM | 7 | Pierre Littbarski | | (substituted off) 62' |
| CM | 8 | Lothar Matthäus (c) |
| CM | 10 | Olaf Thon | (yellow card) 47' |
| LM | 20 | Wolfgang Rolff |
| CF | 18 | Jürgen Klinsmann | | (substituted off) 83' |
| CF | 9 | Rudi Völler |
Substitutions:
| MF | 13 | Wolfram Wuttke | | (substituted on) 62' |
| FW | 11 | Frank Mill | | (substituted on) 83' |
Manager:
Franz Beckenbauer

| GK | 1 | Andoni Zubizarreta |
| RB | 2 | Tomás Reñones |
| CB | 4 | Genar Andrinúa |
| CB | 8 | Manuel Sanchís | (yellow card) 80' |
| LB | 3 | José Antonio Camacho (c) |
| RM | 5 | Víctor Muñoz |
| CM | 20 | Míchel |
| CM | 16 | José Mari Bakero |
| LM | 11 | Rafael Gordillo | (yellow card) 88' |
| RF | 19 | Rafael Martín Vázquez | (yellow card) 34' |
| LF | 9 | Emilio Butragueño | | (substituted off) 51' |
Substitutions:
| RF | 7 | Julio Salinas | | (substituted on) 51' |
Manager:
Miguel Muñoz

Linesmen:
Gérard Biguet (France)
Rémi Harrel (France)
Reserve referee:
Michał Listkiewicz (Poland)

=== Italy vs Denmark ===
17 June 1988
20:15

| Italy | 2–0 | Denmark |
|---|---|---|
| Altobelli 67'; De Agostini 87' | Report |

Müngersdorfer Stadion, Cologne
Attendance: 53,951
Referee: Bruno Galler (Switzerland)

| Italy | Denmark |

| GK | 1 | Walter Zenga |
| SW | 2 | Franco Baresi |
| CB | 3 | Giuseppe Bergomi (c) |
| CB | 6 | Riccardo Ferri |
| CB | 8 | Paolo Maldini |
| RM | 17 | Roberto Donadoni | (substituted off) 85' |
| CM | 14 | Giuseppe Giannini |
| CM | 9 | Carlo Ancelotti |
| LM | 11 | Fernando De Napoli |
| RF | 18 | Roberto Mancini | (substituted off) 66' |
| LF | 20 | Gianluca Vialli |
Substitutions:
| FW | 16 | Alessandro Altobelli | (substituted on) 66' |
| MF | 10 | Luigi De Agostini | (substituted on) 85' |
Manager:
Azeglio Vicini

| GK | 16 | Peter Schmeichel |
| SW | 12 | Lars Olsen |
| CB | 19 | Bjørn Kristensen | (yellow card) 71' |
| CB | 5 | Ivan Nielsen |
| RM | 8 | Per Frimann | | (substituted off) 58' |
| CM | 11 | Michael Laudrup | (yellow card) 22' |
| CM | 4 | Morten Olsen (c) | | (substituted off) 67' |
| CM | 13 | John Jensen |
| LM | 9 | Jan Heintze |
| CF | 18 | John Eriksen |
| CF | 15 | Flemming Povlsen |
Substitutions:
| MF | 20 | Kim Vilfort | | (substituted on) 58' |
| MF | 17 | Klaus Berggreen | | (substituted on) 67' |
Manager:
(West Germany) Sepp Piontek

Linesmen:
Renzo Peduzzi (Switzerland)
Philippe Mercier (Switzerland)
Reserve referee:
Karl-Josef Assenmacher (West Germany)

== See also ==
- Denmark at the UEFA European Championship
- Germany at the UEFA European Championship
- Italy at the UEFA European Championship
- Spain at the UEFA European Championship
