= Errol Refos =

Dutch footballer

Personal information
- Date of birth: 19 March 1970 (age 56)
- Place of birth: Paramaribo, Suriname
- Height: 1.64 m (5 ft 5 in)
- Position: Defender

Senior career*
Years	Team	Apps	(Gls)
1987–1989	SBV Excelsior		
1989–1991	SVV Schiedam		
1991–1992	Dordrecht '90	28	(0)
1992–1995	Feyenoord	57	(0)
1995–1998	FC Utrecht	36	(0)
1998–1999	SC Telstar	23	(0)
1999–2000	Wuppertaler SV		
2000–2002	AV De Spartaan		

International career
1989–1990	Netherlands U21	2	(0)
- * Club domestic league appearances and goals

Errol Refos (born 19 March 1970) is a Dutch former professional footballer who played as a defender for Eredivisie club Feyenoord during the 1992–1995 football seasons.
