= 1992 Dutch Supercup =

1992 PTT Telecom Cup
PSV Eindhoven	Feyenoord
1	0
- Date: 12 August 1992
- Venue: De Kuip, Rotterdam
- Referee: Mario van der Ende
- Attendance: 32,650

The 1992 Dutch Supercup (Dutch: Nederlandse Supercup), known as the PTT Telecom Cup for sponsorship reasons, was the third Supercup match in Dutch football. The game was played on 12 August 1992 at De Kuip in Rotterdam, between 1991–92 Eredivisie champions PSV Eindhoven and 1991–92 KNVB Cup winners Feyenoord. PSV won the match 1–0.

== Match details ==
12 August 1992

PSV Eindhoven	1–0	Feyenoord
Koeman 25'	Report

De Kuip, Rotterdam
Attendance: 32,650
Referee: Mario van der Ende

PSV Eindhoven	Feyenoord

GK
RB
CB
CB
LB
RM
CM
CM
LM
CF
CF
Substitutes:
MF
Manager:
(Netherlands) Hans Westerhof

(Netherlands) Hans van Breukelen
(Netherlands) Ernest Faber	Booked
(Romania) Gheorghe Popescu
(Netherlands) Adri van Tiggelen
(Denmark) Jan Heintze
(Netherlands) Gerald Vanenburg (c)	(substituted off) 46'
(Netherlands) Juul Ellerman
(Netherlands) Erwin Koeman	Booked
(Netherlands) Arthur Numan
(Brazil) Romário	Booked
(Denmark) Thomas Thorninger
(Netherlands) Dick Schreuder	(substituted in) 46'

GK
RB
CB
CB
LB
CM
CM
CM
RW
CF
LW
Substitutes:
FW
Manager:
(Netherlands) Willem van Hanegem

(Netherlands) Ed de Goey
(Netherlands) Errol Refos
(Netherlands) John Metgod (c)
(Netherlands) John de Wolf
(Netherlands) Ulrich van Gobbel
(Netherlands) Arnold Scholten	Booked
(Netherlands) Henk Fraser	Booked
(Netherlands) Rob Witschge
(Netherlands) Gaston Taument
(Nigeria) Mike Obiku	(substituted off) 61'
(Netherlands) Regi Blinker
(Hungary) József Kiprich	(substituted in) 61'
