= Adri van Tiggelen =

Dutch footballer

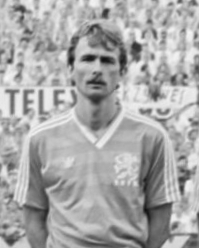
- Van Tiggelen in 1987

Personal information
- Full name: Adrianus Andreas van Tiggelen
- Date of birth: 16 June 1957 (age 69)
- Place of birth: Oud-Beijerland, Netherlands
- Height: 1.83 m (6 ft 0 in)
- Position: Left back

Youth career
- Sparta Rotterdam

Senior career*
Years	Team	Apps	(Gls)
1978–1983	Sparta Rotterdam	161	(13)
1983–1986	Groningen	97	(5)
1986–1991	Anderlecht	144	(7)
1991–1994	PSV	72	(0)
1994–1995	Dordrecht'90	31	(1)
Total		505	(26)

International career
1983–1992	Netherlands	56	(0)
Medal record
Representing Netherlands
UEFA European Championship
Winner	1988 West Germany
- * Club domestic league appearances and goals

Adrianus Andreas "Adri" van Tiggelen (born 16 June 1957) is a retired Dutch footballer who played as a left back.

His career in football was intimately connected to Sparta Rotterdam, in which he began as a professional footballer, going on to manage the side in several categories and capacities, but he also played with great success in Belgium for Anderlecht.

Van Tiggelen appeared nearly 60 times for the Netherlands, representing the nation at the 1990 World Cup and two European Championships, being a starter in the team that won Euro 1988.

== Playing career ==
Born in Oud-Beijerland, South Holland, Van Tiggelen – nicknamed "De Spijker" ("the nail") – started his professional career with Sparta Rotterdam, making his Eredivisie debut on 30 August 1978, in a 1–0 home in against neighbours Feyenoord. During his five-year spell at the club, he was an undisputed starter, also finding the net every season (for a total of 13 league goals).

In 1983, Van Tiggelen signed with fellow league side FC Groningen and remained there for three years, managing to again maintain top level status in every season. Afterwards, he had his first abroad experience, as he joined R.S.C. Anderlecht in neighbouring Belgium, where he also appeared regularly as first-choice.

Aged 34, Van Tiggelen returned to his own country, moving to PSV Eindhoven. The veteran marker still managed to collect nearly 100 official appearances, playing 26 games as the side won the 1991–92 national championship. He saw out his career at 38, after one season – and again in the top division – with Dordrecht'90; his last game ended 5–1, at home against FC Volendam, though the season ended in relegation for the club.

== Managerial career ==
Van Tiggelen then returned to his first club, mainly serving as assistant manager and youth trainer. In 2005, he had his first head coach experience, and finished the season in the second position, helping Sparta return to the first division.

The second spell as head manager – still with Sparta – occurred in late 2007, following the dismissal of Gert Aandewiel. Subsequently, Van Tiggelen was part of Foeke Booy's coaching staff.

== International career ==
Van Tiggelen earned 56 caps for the Netherlands national football team, going scoreless in the process. His debut came at age 26, as he appeared in a friendly with Belgium on 21 September 1983 (1–1).

From 1986 onwards, Van Tiggelen was an automatic first-choice in the national team's setup: he played in every match and minute at UEFA Euro 1988, which the Netherlands won, and also represented the nation at the 1990 FIFA World Cup and Euro 1992. He retired from international play following the side's elimination against eventual winners Denmark in the latter competition; he was aged 35, and formed in previous years an efficient fullback partnership with Berry van Aerle (also his club mate from 1991 to 1994).

== Career statistics ==
=== International ===
Appearances and goals by national team and year
National team	Year	Apps	Goals
Netherlands	1983	2	0
Netherlands	1984	2	0
Netherlands	1985	4	0
Netherlands	1986	7	0
Netherlands	1987	7	0
Netherlands	1988	9	0
Netherlands	1989	6	0
Netherlands	1990	8	0
Netherlands	1991	2	0
Netherlands	1992	9	0
Total		56	0

== Honours ==
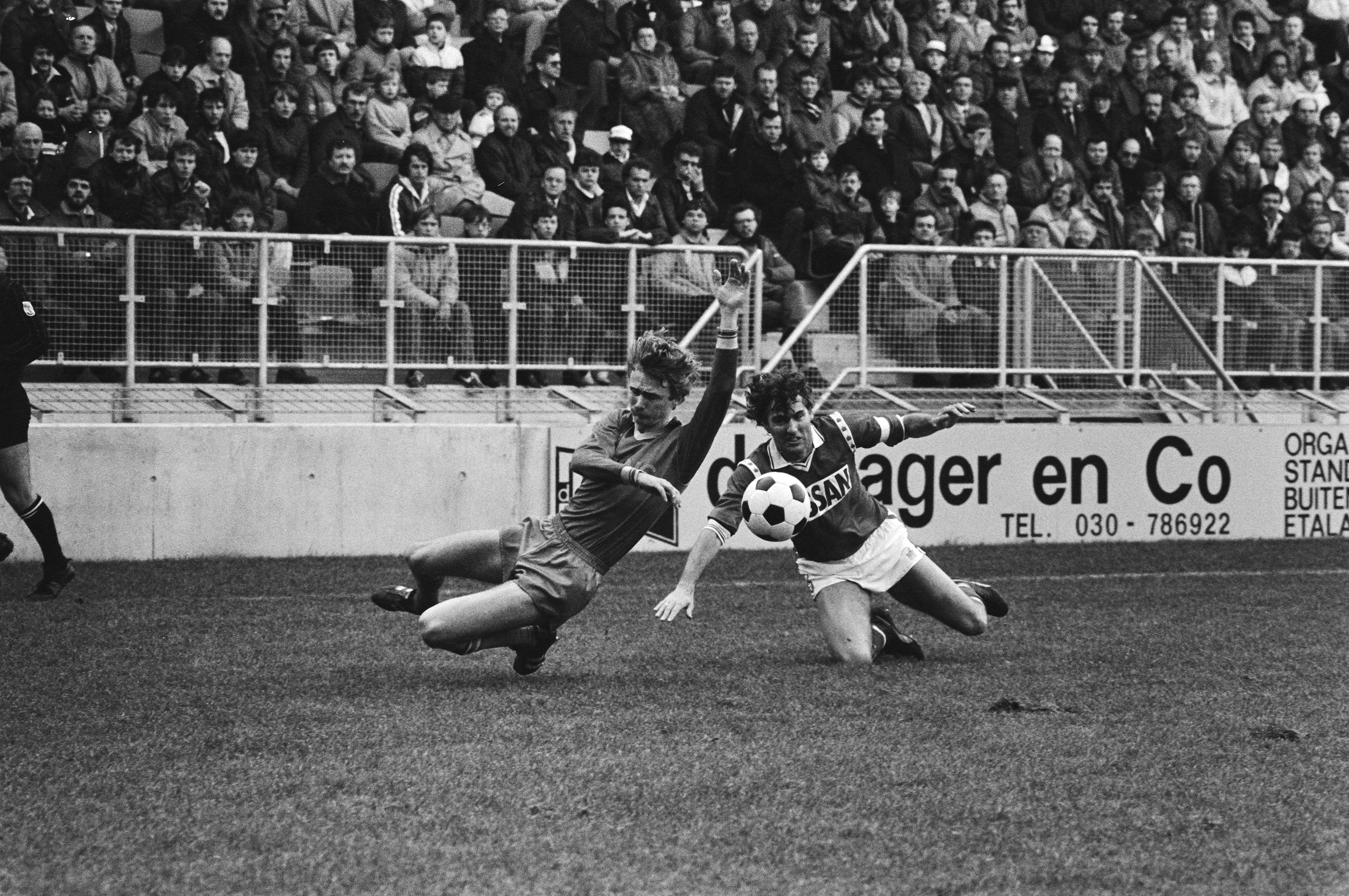
Adri van Tiggelen (left) with Gerard van der Lem, 1983

PSV

- Eredivisie: 1991-92
- Dutch Super Cup (in 1996 rebranded as Johan Cruyff Shield): 1992; runner-up: 1991

Anderlecht

- Belgian League: 1986–87, 1990–91
- Belgian Cup: 1987–88, 1988–89
- Belgian Supercup: 1986, 1987; runner-up 1988, 1989

Netherlands

- UEFA European Championship: 1988
