= Berry van Aerle =

Dutch footballer (born 1962)

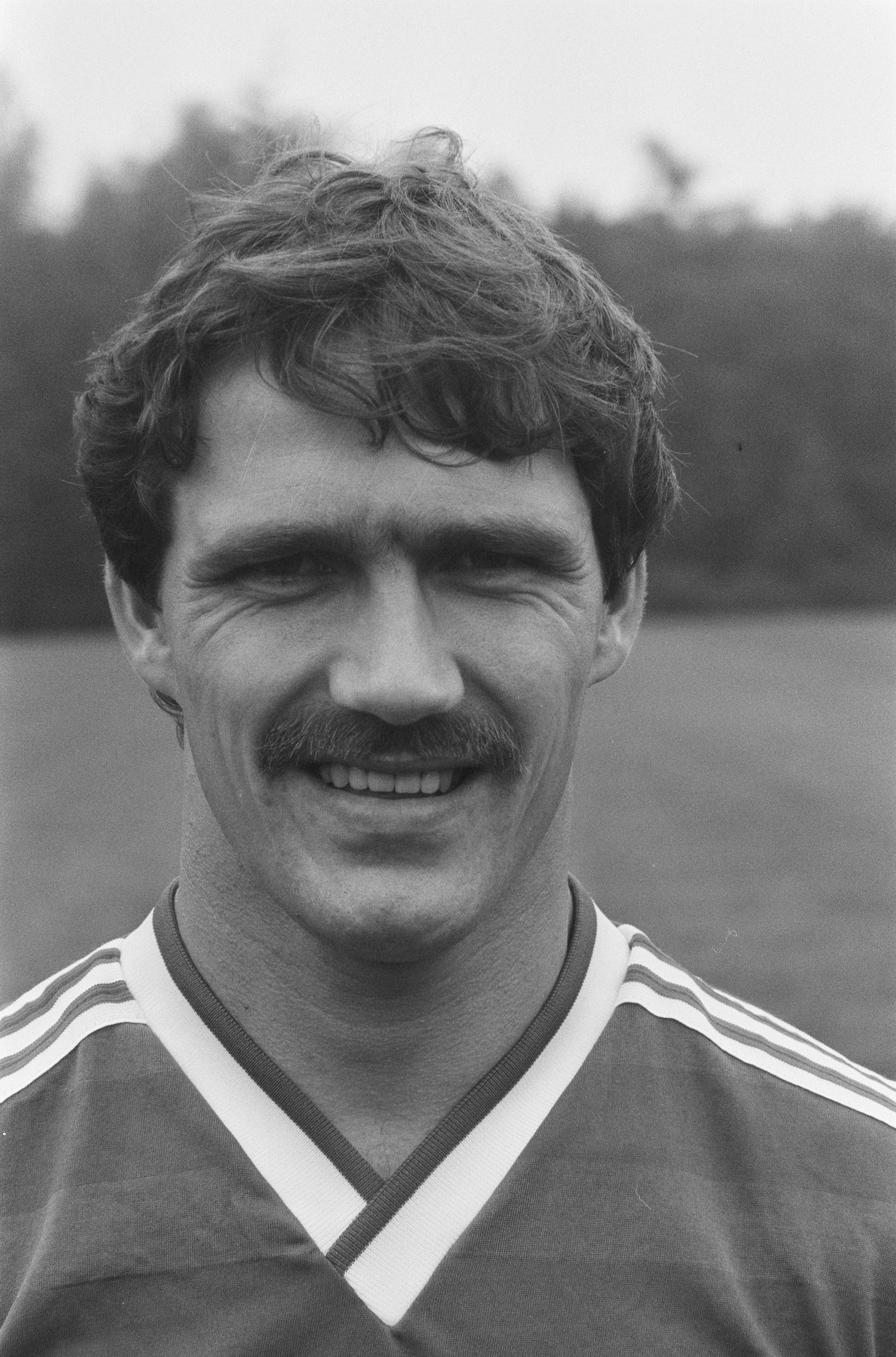
- Van Aerle in 1987

Personal information
- Date of birth: 8 December 1962 (age 63)
- Place of birth: Helmond, Netherlands
- Height: 1.77 m (5 ft 10 in)
- Positions: Right-back; midfielder

Youth career
- HVV Helmond

Senior career*
Years	Team	Apps	(Gls)
1981–1994	PSV	281	(12)
1986–1987	→ Antwerp (loan)	22	(1)
1994–1995	Helmond Sport	15	(1)
Total		318	(14)

International career
1987–1992	Netherlands	35	(0)
Medal record
Representing Netherlands
UEFA European Championship
Winner	1988
- * Club domestic league appearances and goals

Hubertus Aegidius Hermanus "Berry" van Aerle (Dutch pronunciation: [ˈbɛri vɑn ˈaːrlə]; born 8 December 1962) is a Dutch former professional footballer who played mainly as a right-back but also as a midfielder.

A tough tackler, he was best known for his spell with PSV, which he helped capture the 1988 European Cup. A Dutch international for five years, he won the Euro 1988 tournament.

== Club career ==
Born in Helmond, North Brabant, van Aerle spent 13 years with Eredivisie giants PSV Eindhoven, helping them to five leagues. During most of his spell, he also played as a defensive midfielder as the right-back slot was occupied by veteran Belgian Eric Gerets; incidentally, the Dutchman spent one year in that country, on loan to Royal Antwerp FC.

Van Aerle played the entire final of the 1987–88 European Cup, won on penalties against S.L. Benfica after a 0–0 draw. "It wasn't a particularly good match, with both teams very cautious, but it was exciting until the end and a tense penalty shoot-out. It does not matter how you win it, just as long as you do. Now we're in the history books forever: we lifted that trophy", van Aerle told Berend Scholten on UEFA.com. After Gerets retired in 1992, he began dealing with several injuries but still managed to appear regularly, collecting more than 300 overall appearances until his departure; he was also one of five European players to ever achieve the feat of winning four competitions – three with their club and one with the national team – in the same year, the others being teammates Hans van Breukelen, Wim Kieft, Ronald Koeman and Gerald Vanenburg.

Eventually, Van Aerle retired from play after one sole season with hometown's Helmond Sport. After working as a mailman in his hometown, he returned to PSV, where he served in several capacities like talent scout and supporters coordinator.

== International career ==
Van Aerle won his first cap for the Netherlands on 14 October 1987. In the following year's UEFA European Championship, he was an undisputed starter as the national side lifted their first continental trophy, in West Germany (all matches and minutes).

In total, van Aerle appeared in 35 games in exactly five years, also being selected for the 1990 FIFA World Cup and Euro 1992. During those years, he formed an efficient fullback partnership with Adri van Tiggelen, also his clubmate in the early 90s.

== Career statistics ==
=== International ===
Appearances and goals by national team and year
National team	Year	Apps	Goals
Netherlands	1987	4	0
Netherlands	1988	9	0
Netherlands	1989	6	0
Netherlands	1990	7	0
Netherlands	1991	1	0
Netherlands	1992	8	0
Total		35	0

== Honours ==
PSV

- Eredivisie: 1985-86, 1986-87, 1987-88, 1988-89, 1990-91, 1991-92
- KNVB Cup: 1987-88, 1988-89, 1989-90
- Dutch Super Cup (in 1996 renamed as Johan Cruyff Shield): 1992; runner-up 1991
- European Cup: 1987-88

Netherlands

- UEFA European Championship: 1988
