= Wim Kieft =

Dutch footballer (born 1962)

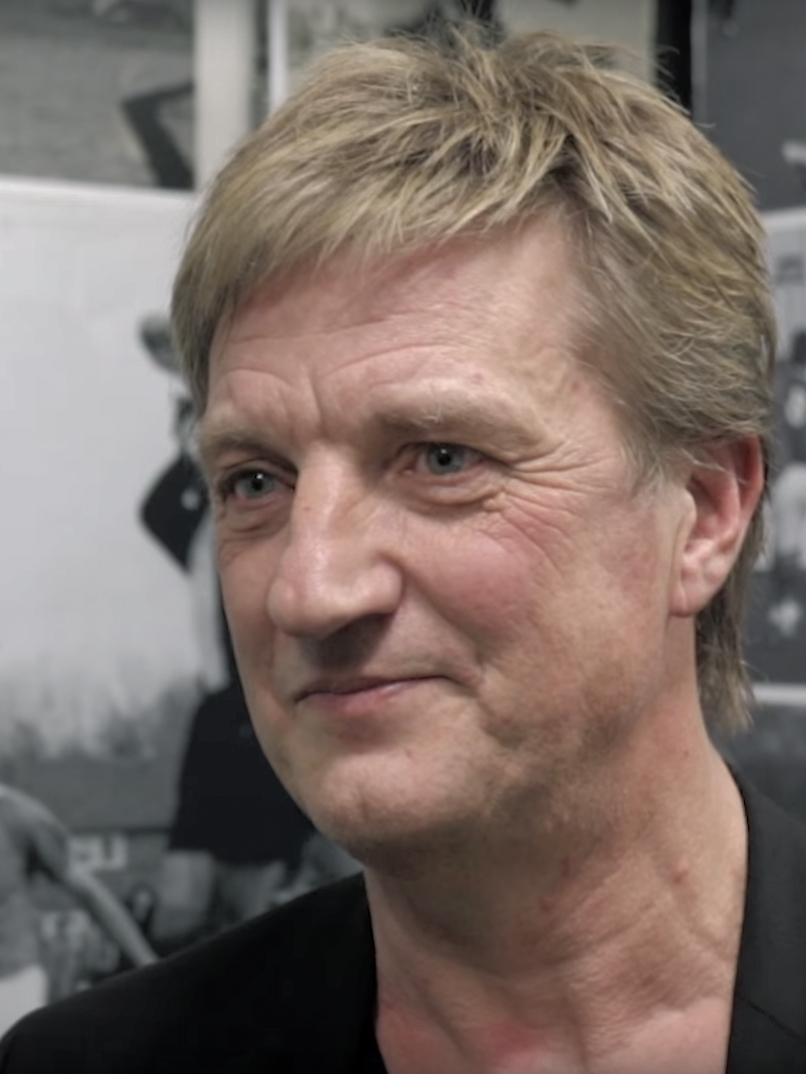
- Kieft in 2017

Personal information
- Full name: Willem Cornelis Nicolaas Kieft
- Date of birth: 12 November 1962 (age 64)
- Place of birth: Amsterdam, Netherlands
- Height: 1.90 m (6 ft 3 in)
- Position: Centre forward

Youth career
- AVV Madjoe
- 1975–1979: Ajax

Senior career*
Years	Team	Apps	(Gls)
1979–1983	Ajax	96	(68)
1983–1986	Pisa	91	(25)
1986–1987	Torino	19	(8)
1987–1990	PSV	82	(55)
1990–1991	Bordeaux	26	(3)
1991–1994	PSV	88	(34)
Total		402	(193)

International career
1981–1993	Netherlands	43	(11)
Medal record
Men's football
Representing Netherlands
UEFA European Championship
Winner	1988
Third place	1992
- * Club domestic league appearances and goals

Willem Cornelis Nicolaas "Wim" Kieft (born 12 November 1962) is a Dutch former professional footballer who played as a centre forward. Kieft went into punditry in 2001, occasionally appearing on football talk show Voetbal Inside.

As a goal-scorer whose main asset was his heading ability, he played for two big clubs, Ajax and PSV in the Netherlands and he also played in Italy and France.

Kieft played for the Netherlands national team, and was a member of the squad that won Euro 1988. He also represented his nation at the 1990 World Cup and Euro 1992.

== Club career ==
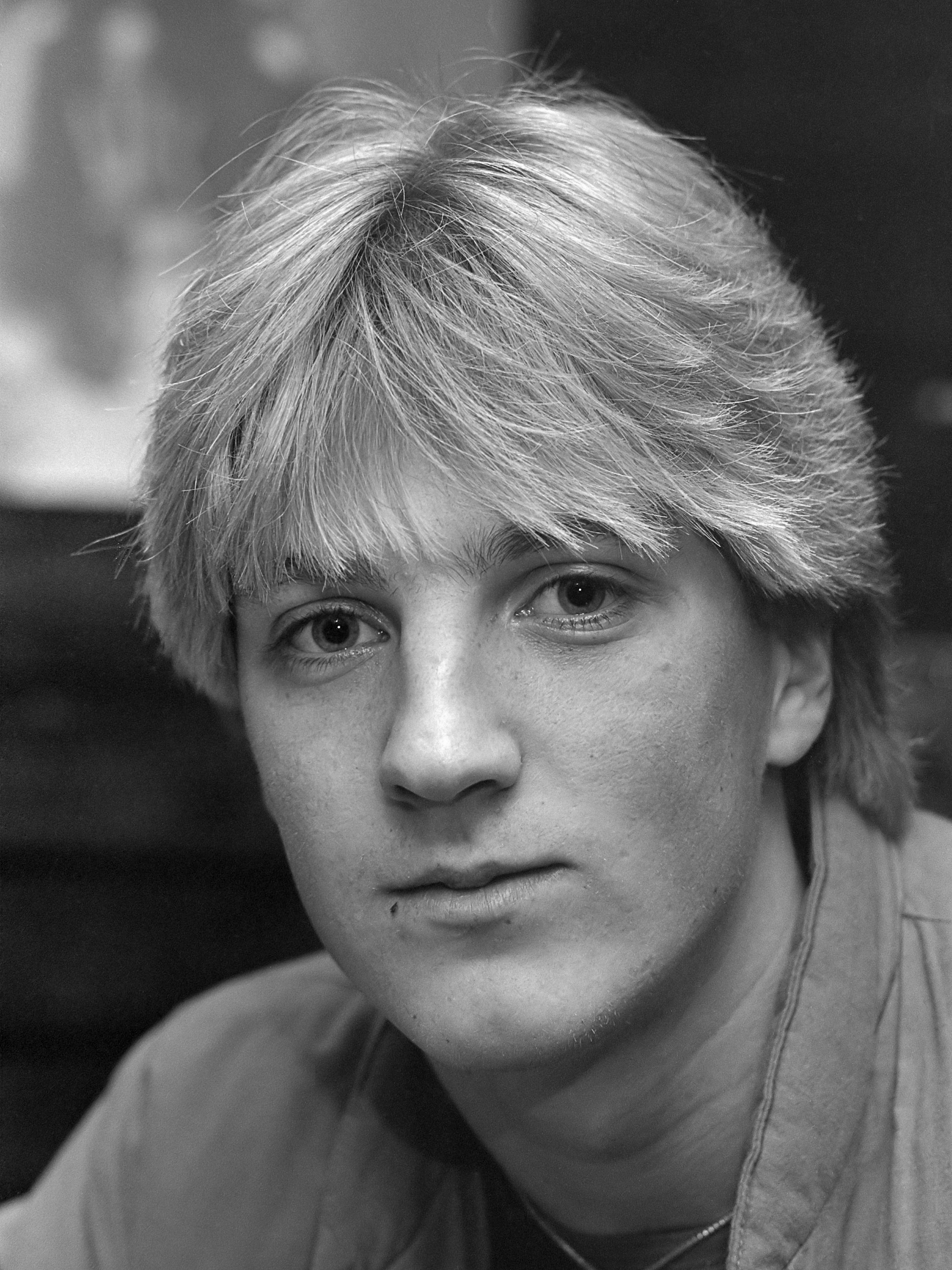
Kieft in 1981

Born in Amsterdam, Kieft started his professional career with local side Ajax, making his first-team debuts on 4 May 1980, when he was not yet 18. Amongst his young and upcoming teammates were Frank Rijkaard, John van 't Schip, Marco van Basten and Gerald Vanenburg, alongside established players like Johan Cruijff, Søren Lerby and Ruud Krol. In his first two full seasons, he scored at an astonishing rate, especially in the 1981–82 season, when he netted 32 goals in as many games, being crucial as the team won the Eredivisie title; he received the European Golden Boot award.

At only 20, Kieft was sold to Italy's Pisa, scoring only three times in a relegation-ending campaign. He did help the Tuscany side immediately promote to Serie A, but underperformed overall in the top flight, with that club and his subsequent one, Torino.

In the summer of 1987, Kieft returned to his country and signed for PSV. His impact was immediate as his new team won the treble, including the season's European Cup, where he scored in the penalty shootout defeat of Benfica (0–0 after 120 minutes). En route to these accolades, he contributed with more than 30 goals overall, 29 alone in the league, a competition-best; he was also one of five European players to ever achieve the feat of winning four competitions – three with their club, and one with the national team – in the same year, the others being teammates Berry van Aerle, Hans van Breukelen, Ronald Koeman and Vanenburg.

Kieft had his second and last abroad experience in 1990, joining Bordeaux in France and again underachieving, returning to PSV and playing three more seasons until his retirement, averaging more than eleven goals in his second spell with the latter. In total, he scored 158 times in only 264 matches in the Netherlands' top division.

Kieft rejoined PSV in 2009, being named as assistant coach of the club's youth sides.

== International career ==
Kieft earned his first cap for the Netherlands in 1981. He would represent the national team in three major international tournaments, UEFA Euro 1988, the 1990 FIFA World Cup and Euro 1992.

In the first competition, Kieft played three times for the eventual champions, always as a second-half substitute: on 18 June 1988, after having replaced Erwin Koeman, he scored in the 82nd minute of the 1–0 group stage win against the Republic of Ireland, through a header, helping the Dutch overtake their opponents in the match and finish second in Group 2 to secure a place in the semi-finals.

Kieft played four times in his second tournament, held in Italy, starting against a familiar opponent, Ireland, and finding the net in the 1–1 draw against Egypt as the Oranje exited in the round-of-16.

Kieft played only one match during his third and final tournament, replacing Frank de Boer at the start of the second half of the Euro 1992 semi-finals against Denmark.

== Post-retirement career and personal life ==
After retiring, Kieft worked as a football pundit for television channels Sport1 and RTL, making a name for himself as a commentator and pundit with popular football talkshow Voetbal Inside (VI). In 2016, Kieft signed an exclusive agreement with Ziggo Sport. Because of this, he initially could not feature at the VI table. At the end of 2018, Kieft returned twice a week as a table guest at VI. In 2019, Kieft signed a three-year contract with Talpa, which meant that he returned to their new program, Veronica Inside, with the same concept as VI.

His son, Robbin (born 1987), was also a footballer. After attending Ajax and Groningen's youth academies, he played exclusively in the lower leagues of the country.

In his biography, published in 2014, Kieft admitted a long-lasting addiction to alcohol and cocaine, which began after the end of his career and ended after a withdrawal treatment.

== Career statistics ==
=== International ===
Appearances and goals by national team and year
National team	Year	Apps	Goals
Netherlands	1981	1	0
Netherlands	1982	5	1
Netherlands	1984	2	2
Netherlands	1985	5	3
Netherlands	1986	1	0
Netherlands	1988	5	2
Netherlands	1989	4	1
Netherlands	1990	8	1
Netherlands	1991	5	0
Netherlands	1992	6	1
Netherlands	1993	1	0
Total		43	11

Scores and results list Netherlands' goal tally first, score column indicates score after each Kieft goal.

List of international goals scored by Wim Kieft
No.	Date	Venue	Opponent	Score	Result	Competition	Ref.
1	23 March 1982	Hampden Park, Glasgow, Scotland	Scotland	1–2	1–2	Friendly	
2	14 March 1984	De Meer Stadion, Amsterdam, Netherlands	Denmark	1–0	6–0	Friendly	
3	17 October 1984	De Kuip, Rotterdam, Netherlands	Hungary	1–0	1–2	1986 FIFA World Cup qualification	
4	27 February 1985	De Meer Stadion, Amsterdam, Netherlands	Cyprus	2–1	7–1	1986 FIFA World Cup qualification	
5	27 February 1985	De Meer Stadion, Amsterdam, Netherlands	Cyprus	4–1	7–1	1986 FIFA World Cup qualification	
6	1 May 1985	De Kuip, Rotterdam, Netherlands	Austria	1–0	1–1	1986 FIFA World Cup qualification	
7	1 June 1988	Olympic Stadium, Amsterdam, Netherlands	Romania	2–0	2–0	Friendly	
8	18 June 1988	Parkstadion, Gelsenkirchen, Germany	Republic of Ireland	1–0	1–0	UEFA Euro 1988	
9	31 May 1989	Helsinki Olympic Stadium, Helsinki, Finland	Finland	1–0	1–0	1990 FIFA World Cup qualification	
10	12 June 1990	Stadio Renzo Barbera, Palermo, Italy	Egypt	1–0	1–1	1990 FIFA World Cup	
11	25 March 1992	De Meer Stadion, Amsterdam, Netherlands	Yugoslavia	1–0	2–0	Friendly	

== Honours ==
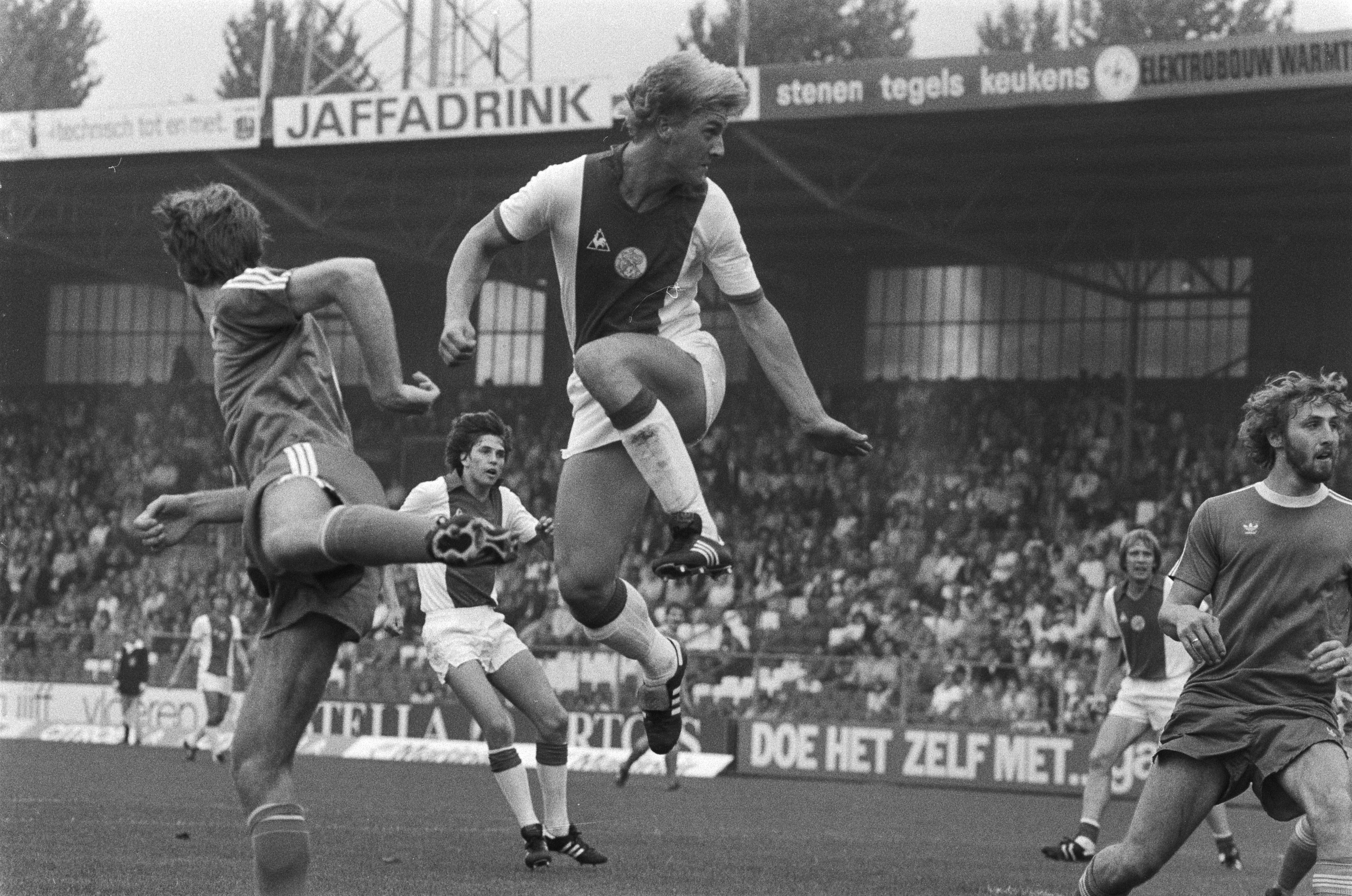
Kieft in action for Ajax in 1980

Ajax

- Eredivisie: 1979–80, 1981–82, 1982–83
- KNVB Cup: 1982–83; runner-up: 1979–80, 1980–81

Pisa

- Serie B: 1984–85
- Mitropa Cup: 1985–86

PSV

- Eredivisie: 1987–88, 1988–89, 1991–92
- KNVB Cup: 1987–88, 1988–89, 1989–90
- Dutch Super Cup (in 1996 rebranded as Johan Cruyff Shield): 1992; runner-up: 1991
- European Cup: 1987–88

Netherlands

- UEFA European Championship: 1988

Individual

- Eredivisie top scorer: 1981–82, 1987–88
- European Golden Boot: 1982
- UEFA Cup Top scorer: 1986–87
