= Gerald Vanenburg =

Dutch footballer and manager (born 1964)

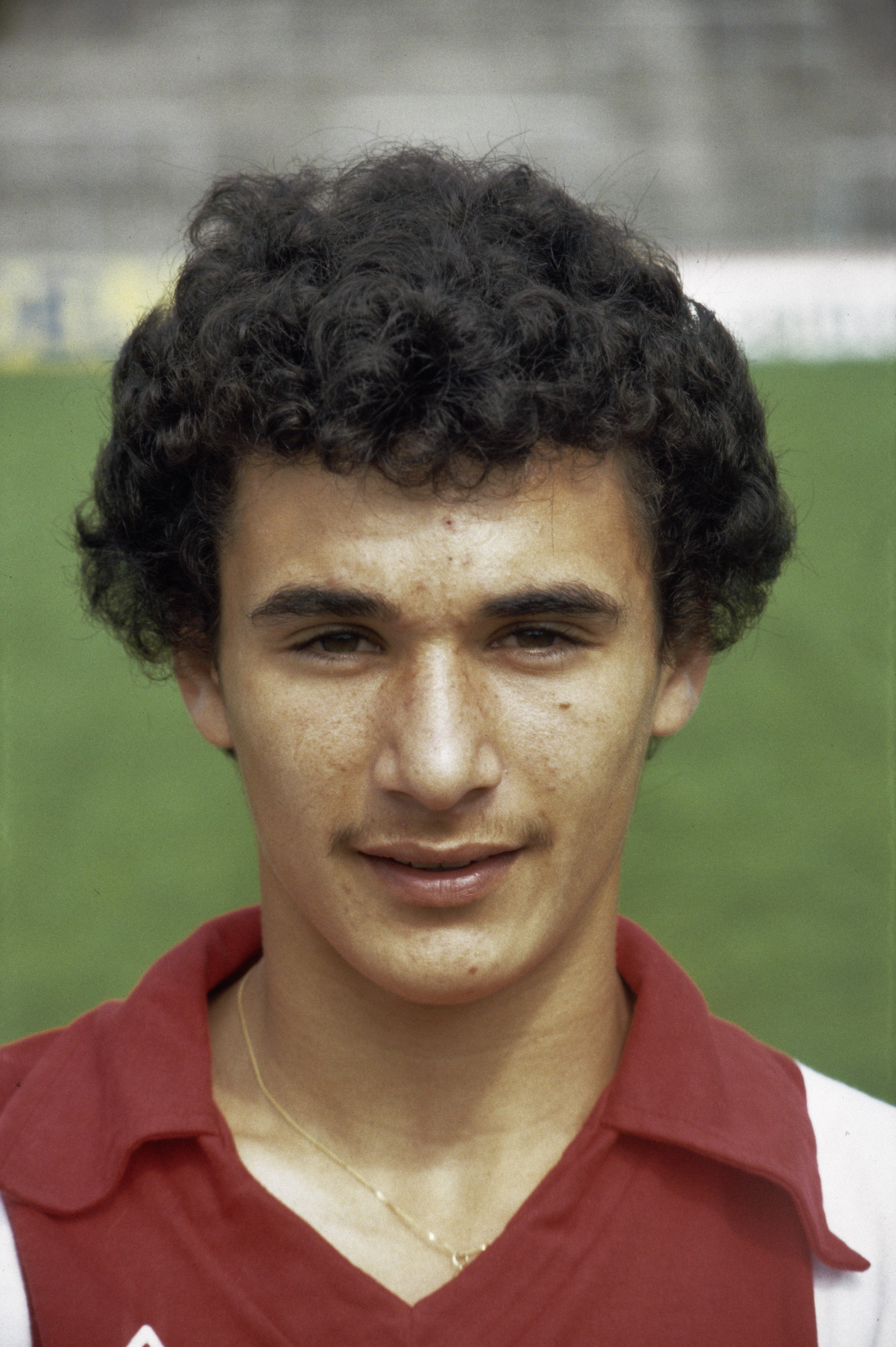
- Vanenburg in 1981

Personal information
- Full name: Gerald Mervin Vanenburg
- Date of birth: 5 March 1964 (age 62)
- Place of birth: Utrecht, Netherlands
- Height: 1.72 m (5 ft 8 in)
- Position: Winger

Youth career
- Sterrewijk
- Elinkwijk

Senior career*
Years	Team	Apps	(Gls)
1980–1986	Ajax	173	(64)
1986–1993	PSV	199	(48)
1993–1996	Júbilo Iwata	86	(14)
1997	Utrecht	9	(2)
1997–1998	Cannes	26	(6)
1998–2000	1860 Munich	43	(2)
Total		536	(136)

International career
1982–1992	Netherlands	42	(1)

Managerial career
- 2000–2005: PSV (youth)
- 2004: 1860 Munich
- 2006–2007: Helmond Sport
- 2008: FC Eindhoven
- 2008: Willem II (assistant)
- 2025: Indonesia U23
- 2025: Indonesia (assistant)
Medal record
Representing Netherlands
UEFA European Championship
Winner	1988 West Germany
Representing Indonesia (as manager)
ASEAN U-23 Championship
Runner-up	2025 Indonesia
- * Club domestic league appearances and goals

Gerald Mervin Vanenburg (born 5 March 1964) is a Dutch professional football manager and former player who was most recently the assistant coach of the Indonesia national team and the head coach of the Indonesia under-23 national team.

He amassed Eredivisie totals of 372 games and 112 goals for Ajax and PSV combined, winning fifteen major titles between the two clubs, including the 1988 European Cup with the latter. Subsequently he played in Japan, France and Germany, in a 20-year professional career.

Vanenburg earned 42 caps for the Netherlands, appearing at the 1990 World Cup and Euro 1988 and winning the latter tournament.

== Club career ==
=== Ajax ===
Born in Utrecht of Surinamese descent, Vanenburg finished his football formation with AFC Ajax, and made his Eredivisie debuts exactly one month after his 17th birthday, against ADO Den Haag. He finished his first season with 11 games and three goals, being soon dubbed Vaantje and Geraldinho for his above-average skills.

Vanenburg became an undisputed starter for the Amsterdam side shortly after, providing countless assists for strikers Marco van Basten and Wim Kieft and adding 30 himself in two seasons combined as the club won back-to-back national championships; before leaving in June 1986, he scored in double digits in two more seasons. Himself, van Basten, Kieft were amongst a steady stream of talented youngsters that also included Frank Rijkaard that helped to the conquest of three league titles between 1982 and 1985.

=== PSV ===
Vanenburg signed for PSV Eindhoven for 1986–87, netting nine goals in 34 matches in his first season, which ended in league conquest. He was part of the team that won the treble the following campaign, with the player appearing in the final of the European Cup and converting his penalty shootout attempt against S.L. Benfica. The backbone of this treble winning team was formed by many of his former teammates at Ajax, including Frank Arnesen, Kieft, Ronald Koeman and Søren Lerby.

Having rejected a lucrative move to AS Roma, Vanenburg played and scored regularly for PSV in the following five seasons, winning a further three leagues and two Dutch Cups. He appeared in nearly 500 official games between the two clubs, scoring almost 150 goals. He was also one of five European players to ever achieve the feat of winning four competitions – three with their club and one with the national team – in the same year, the others being teammates Berry van Aerle, Hans van Breukelen, Kieft and Koeman.

=== Abroad ===
Aged 29, Vanenburg had his first abroad experience, helping Júbilo Iwata promote to the J1 League in his first year then playing a further two seasons with them. He finished the 1996–97 campaign back in his country, playing with FC Utrecht and finishing the season in 12th position.

Until his retirement in 2000 at the age of 36, Vanenburg played three more years of top flight football, with AS Cannes (France) and TSV 1860 Munich (Germany), where he began appearing regularly as a sweeper.

=== Clash with Johan Cruyff ===
In late 1988, Johan Cruyff remarked in Voetbal International magazine that Vanenburg could never become a leader due to his (high-pitched) voice. This haunted Vanenburg during his career in the Netherlands. In 2012, Cruyff publicly apologized for this remark.

== International career ==
Vanenburg made his debut for the Netherlands on 14 April 1982 at only 18, playing the full 90 minutes of a 1–0 friendly win with Greece, in Eindhoven. Vanenburg was a member of the Dutch squad at the 1983 FIFA World Youth Championship. He was selected for the UEFA Euro 1988 tournament in West Germany, appearing in all the games as the Oranje won the competition.

Vanenburg was also picked by manager Leo Beenhakker for his 1990 FIFA World Cup squad, but his contribution consisted of 45 minutes against Egypt (1–1 group stage draw), in an eventual round-of-16 exit in Italy. His last international appearance came as a substitute in a 2–2 draw to Poland on 14 October 1992, in Rotterdam in a 1994 World Cup qualification match.

== Managerial career ==
After leaving 1860 Munich, Vanenburg returned to PSV where he was appointed the youth team's manager. He later returned to his former club 1860 Munich, where he managed the first team during three months in 2004, with the team eventually being relegated from the Bundesliga.

In 2006–07, Vanenburg coached Helmond Sport in the Eerste Divisie, being sacked on 17 February 2007. On 1 January 2008 he was appointed at another club in the same division, FC Eindhoven. He voluntarily left already before the season was over as he could not sit on the bench anymore due to a disciplinary penalty from the Dutch football association KNVB. He joined Willem II as assistent manager for the 2008-09 season.

Vanenburg later coached several youth teams at Ajax from August 2020 until May 2023.

On 24 January 2025, Football Association of Indonesia officially appointed Vanenburg as the new coach of the Indonesia under-23 national team and the assistant coach for the Indonesia national team under Patrick Kluivert. In addition, Vanenburg will work closely with the under-20 and under-17 teams to ensure continuity at all levels. After the national team failed to qualify for 2026 FIFA World Cup, Kluivert, Vanenburg and two other Dutch assistents (Denny Landzaat and Alex Pastoor) left.

== Personal life ==
Vanenburg is the nephew of former Surinamese international player and manager Roy Vanenburg. The latter was considered one of the greatest footballers in the country's history, having won the SVB Hoofdklasse title six times and the CONCACAF Champions Cup twice with S.V. Transvaal.

In 1984, Vanenburg was the main character in a documentary titled Van straat tot stadion (translated From street to stadium) directed by Rimko Haanstra.

Professional football player Javairô Dilrosun is a nephew of Vanenburg.

Vanenburg was married for 26 years, but separated in 2014. From this marriage, he has two daughters. His youngest daughter, Phillis, was a tennis player. In August 2024, Vanenburg's oldest daughter Jaimy died of a rare lung disease at the age of 32.

== Career statistics ==
=== Club ===
Appearances and goals by club, season and competition
Club	Season	League			National cup (Note: Appearances in KNVB Cup, Coupe de France, Emperor's Cup, DFB-Pokal)		Continental		Other (Note: Appearances in J.League Cup, Intercontinental Cup, UEFA Super Cup, Dutch Supercup)		Total	
Club	Season	Division	Apps	Goals	Apps	Goals	Apps	Goals	Apps	Goals	Apps	Goals
Ajax	1980–81	Eredivisie	11	3	2	1	—		—		13	4
Ajax	1981–82	Eredivisie	32	13	2	0	2 (Note: Appearances in European Cup Winners' Cup)	0	—		36	13
Ajax	1982–83	Eredivisie	33	17	7	2	2 (Note: Appearances in European Cup)	1	—		42	20
Ajax	1983–84	Eredivisie	34	7	4	1	2	0	—		40	8
Ajax	1984–85	Eredivisie	29	12	3	1	4 (Note: Appearances in UEFA Cup)	1	—		36	14
Ajax	1985–86	Eredivisie	34	12	6	1	2	0	—		42	13
Ajax	Total		173	64	24	6	12	2	—		209	72
PSV	1986–87	Eredivisie	34	9	3	1	2	0	—		39	10
PSV	1987–88	Eredivisie	34	11	6	1	9	0	—		49	12
PSV	1988–89	Eredivisie	34	10	6	4	4	0	3 (Note: Two appearances in 1988 European Super Cup, one appearance in 1988 Intercontinental Cup)	0	47	14
PSV	1989–90	Eredivisie	21	6	3	0	4	0	—		28	6
PSV	1990–91	Eredivisie	29	11	3	1	2	0	—		34	12
PSV	1991–92	Eredivisie	19	7	1	0	2	1	—		22	8
PSV	1992–93	Eredivisie	28	4	2	0	9	0	1 (Note: One appearance in 1992 Dutch Supercup)	0	40	4
PSV	Total		199	58	24	7	32	1	4	0	259	66
Yamaha Motors	1993	Football League	0	0	1	0	—		4	2	5	2
Júbilo Iwata	1994	J1 League	43	8	1	0	—		4	0	48	8
Júbilo Iwata	1995	J1 League	21	1	2	1	—		—		23	2
Júbilo Iwata	1996	J1 League	22	5	0	0	—		12	3	34	8
Júbilo Iwata	Total		86	14	3	1	—		16	3	105	18
Utrecht	1996–97	Eredivisie	9	2	—		—		—		9	2
Cannes	1997–98	Ligue 1	26	6	2	0	—		—		28	6
1860 Munich	1998–99	Bundesliga	27	2	2	0	—		—		29	2
1860 Munich	1999–2000	Bundesliga	16	0	1	0	—		—		17	0
1860 Munich	Total		43	2	3	0	—		0	0	46	2
Career total			536	146	57	14	44	3	24	5	661	168

=== International ===
Appearances and goals by national team and year
National team	Year	Apps	Goals
Netherlands	1982	4	0
Netherlands	1983	5	1
Netherlands	1984	0	0
Netherlands	1985	0	0
Netherlands	1986	4	0
Netherlands	1987	7	0
Netherlands	1988	10	0
Netherlands	1989	4	0
Netherlands	1990	6	0
Netherlands	1991	1	0
Netherlands	1992	1	0
Total		42	1

Scores and results list the Netherlands' goal tally first, score column indicates score after each Vanenburg goal.

List of international goals scored by Gerald Vanenburg
No.	Date	Venue	Opponent	Score	Result	Competition
1	17 December 1983	De Kuip, Rotterdam, Netherlands	Malta	1–0	5–0	Euro 1984 qualifying

== Managerial statistics ==
As of match played 9 September 2025

Managerial record by team and tenure
Team	Nat	From	To	Record					Ref.
Team	Nat	From	To	G	W	D	L	Win %	Ref.
TSV 1860 Munich	(Germany)	19 April 2004	23 May 2004	5	0	2	3	0.00	
Helmond Sport	(Netherlands)	1 July 2006	17 February 2007	13	3	4	6	23.08	
FC Eindhoven	(Netherlands)	1 January 2008	31 March 2008	10	1	3	6	10.00	
Indonesia U23	(Indonesia)	24 January 2025	16 October 2025	8	3	3	2	37.50	
Career Total				36	7	12	17	19.44	

== Honours ==
=== Player ===
Ajax

- Eredivisie: 1981–82, 1982–83, 1984–85
- KNVB Cup: 1982–83, 1985–86

PSV

- European Cup: 1987–88
- Eredivisie: 1986–87, 1987–88, 1988–89, 1990–91, 1991–92
- KNVB Cup: 1987–88, 1988–89, 1989–90
- Johan Cruijff Shield: 1992

Netherlands

- UEFA European Championship: 1988

Individual

- Dutch Golden Boot: 1988, 1989

=== Manager ===
==== Indonesia U23 ====
- ASEAN U-23 Championship runner-up: 2025

== See also ==
- AFC Ajax-PSV Eindhoven rivalry
