= Hans van Breukelen =

Dutch footballer

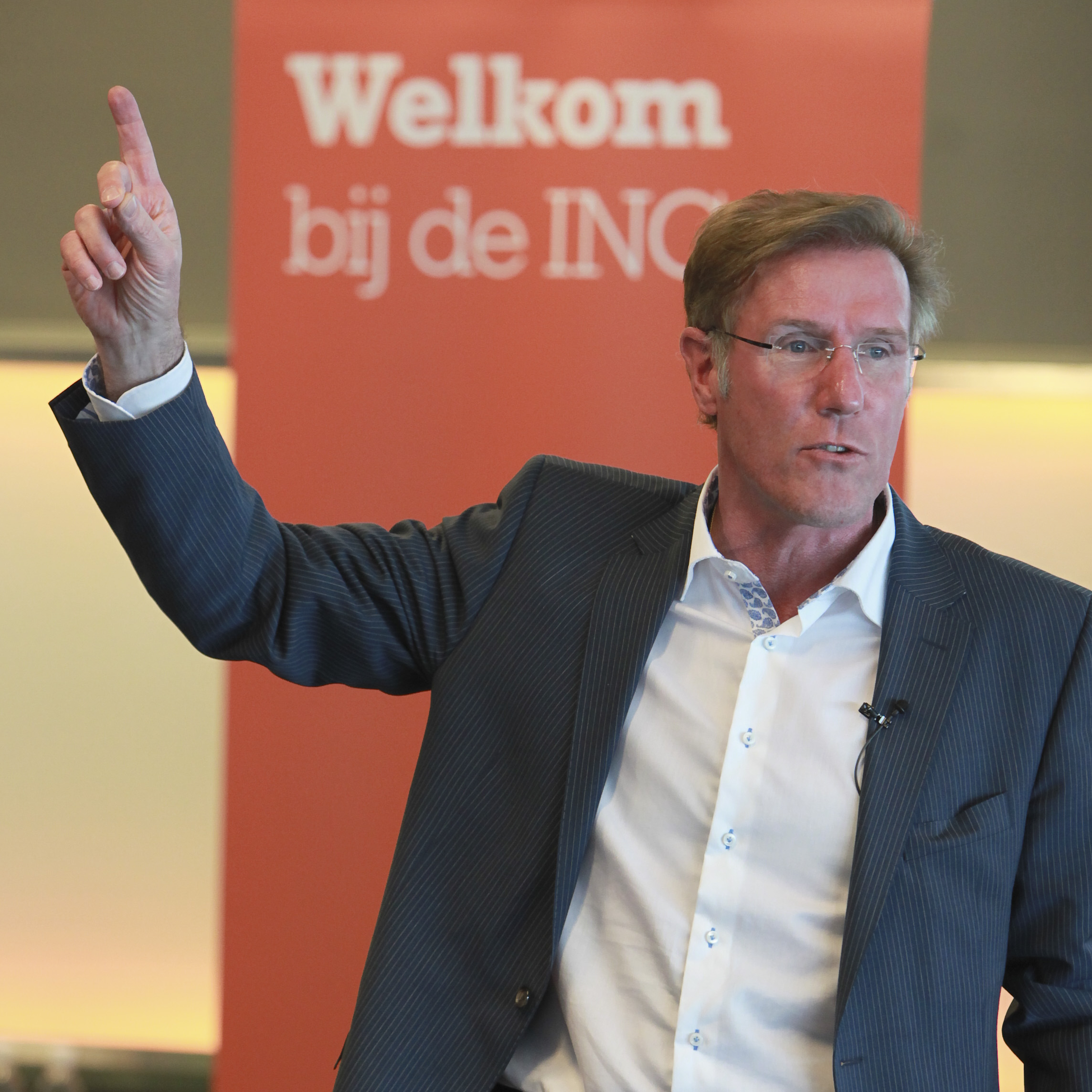
- Van Breukelen in 2011

Personal information
- Full name: Johannes Franciscus van Breukelen
- Date of birth: 4 October 1956 (age 70)
- Place of birth: Utrecht, Netherlands
- Height: 1.88 m (6 ft 2 in)
- Position: Goalkeeper

Youth career
- 1964–1975: BVC

Senior career*
Years	Team	Apps	(Gls)
1975–1982	Utrecht	142	(0)
1982–1984	Nottingham Forest	61	(0)
1984–1994	PSV Eindhoven	308	(0)
Total		511	(0)

International career
1980–1992	Netherlands	73	(0)
Medal record
Representing Netherlands
UEFA European Championship
Winner	1988 West Germany
Third place	1992 Sweden
- * Club domestic league appearances and goals

Johannes Franciscus "Hans" van Breukelen (Dutch pronunciation: [ˈɦɑns fɑm ˈbrøːkələ(n)]; (Note: Van in isolation: [vɑn].) born 4 October 1956) is a Dutch former professional footballer who played as a goalkeeper. He was the technical director of the Royal Dutch Football Association (KNVB) from 2017 until 2018.

Van Breukelen grew up in De Bilt, where he played in the BVC youth academy. In 1976, he moved to FC Utrecht, where he played 142 matches. After two years with Nottingham Forest, Van Breukelen moved to PSV Eindhoven in 1984. With PSV, he won six league titles and three domestic cups. In 1988, Van Breukelen also won the European Cup as part of the Treble after saving Benfica's sixth penalty in the shoot-out. In the Netherlands, he was named Goalkeeper of the Year four times.

Van Breukelen played 73 caps for the Netherlands national team. He was included in the Dutch squad for UEFA Euro 1980, but didn't play a match. At UEFA Euro 1988 with the Netherlands, Van Breukelen stopped a penalty in the final. He also appeared at the 1990 World Cup and UEFA Euro 1992. After his career, he became an entrepreneur in different non-football business ventures, although he served as director of football at FC Utrecht and was a member of the PSV board of directors from 2010 to 2016.

Hans van Breukelen is one of five European players to ever win a Treble with their club and a cup with their national team in the same year. The other four players are his teammates Berry van Aerle, Ronald Koeman, Gerald Vanenburg and Wim Kieft.

== Early years ==
Van Breukelen, born in Utrecht, started playing club football at amateur team BVC from De Bilt in 1964. In 1974, he reached the BVC first team at age 17. A few months later, Van Breukelen was transferred to FC Utrecht. In his youth, he studied to become a teacher; even after he signed for Utrecht, he finished his study in pedagogy and taught in schools.

== Club career ==
=== Utrecht and Nottingham Forest ===
Van Breukelen started out in the Utrecht reserve team, but soon became the club's third goalkeeper behind Blagoj Istatov and Jan Stroomberg. On 20 March 1977, Van Breukelen made his official debut after being chosen to replace Istanov in the match against Sparta, which Utrecht lost 3–0 away from home. He would later become the first-choice between the sticks for four years.

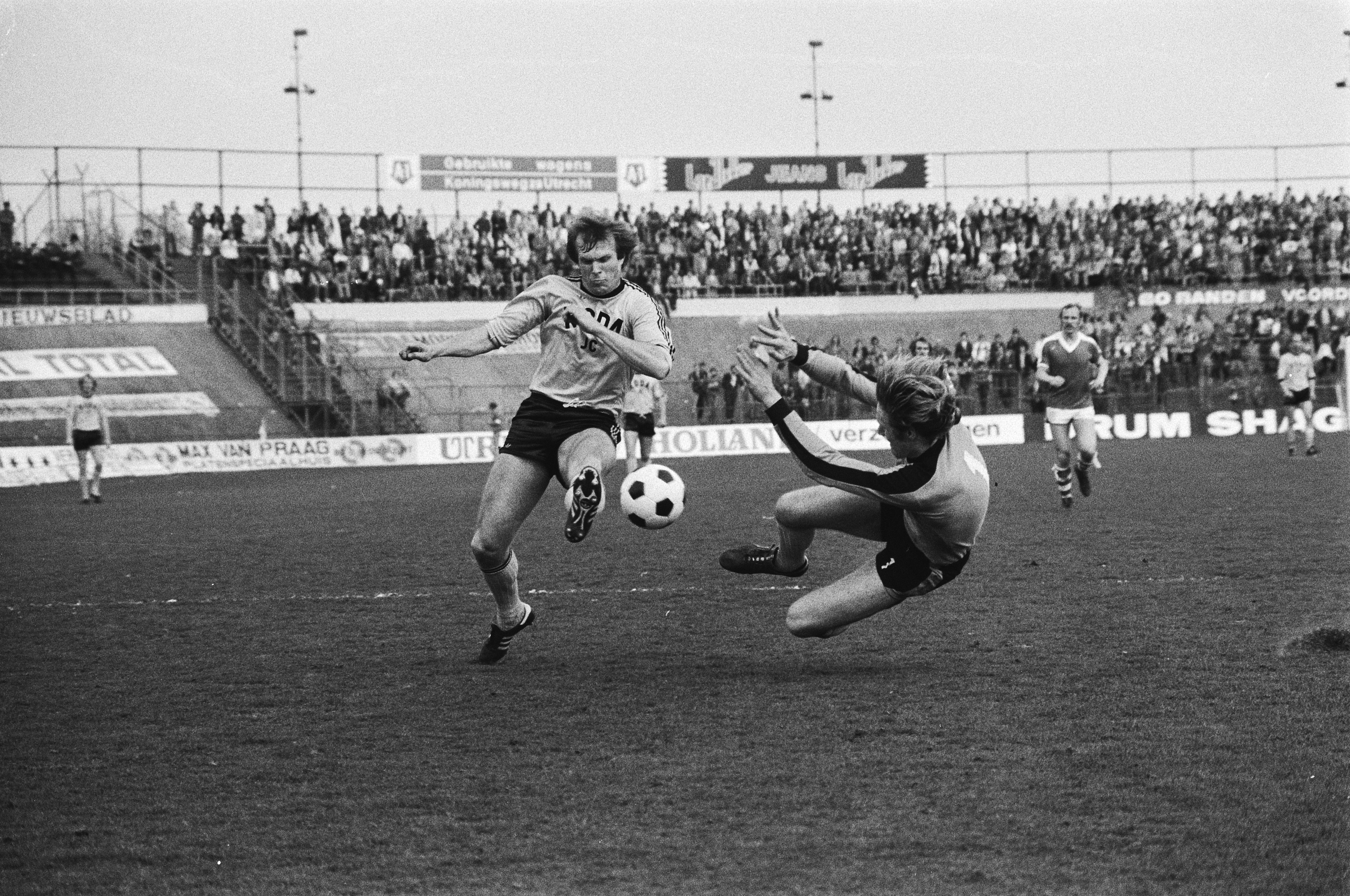
Hans van Breukelen attempting to stop a shot by Theo de Jong in 1979

In the 1980–81 season, Utrecht reached the third place (its highest ever position to date) and a year later, Van Breukelen and his team reached the KNVB Cup final. In 1982, Utrecht was facing bankruptcy and were willing to sell Van Breukelen in order to raise funds. Initially, there was no sign of a transfer and he played two matches in the 1982–83 season. But in September, Van Breukelen was eventually signed by Nottingham Forest. In total, he played 142 Eredivisie games for the club.

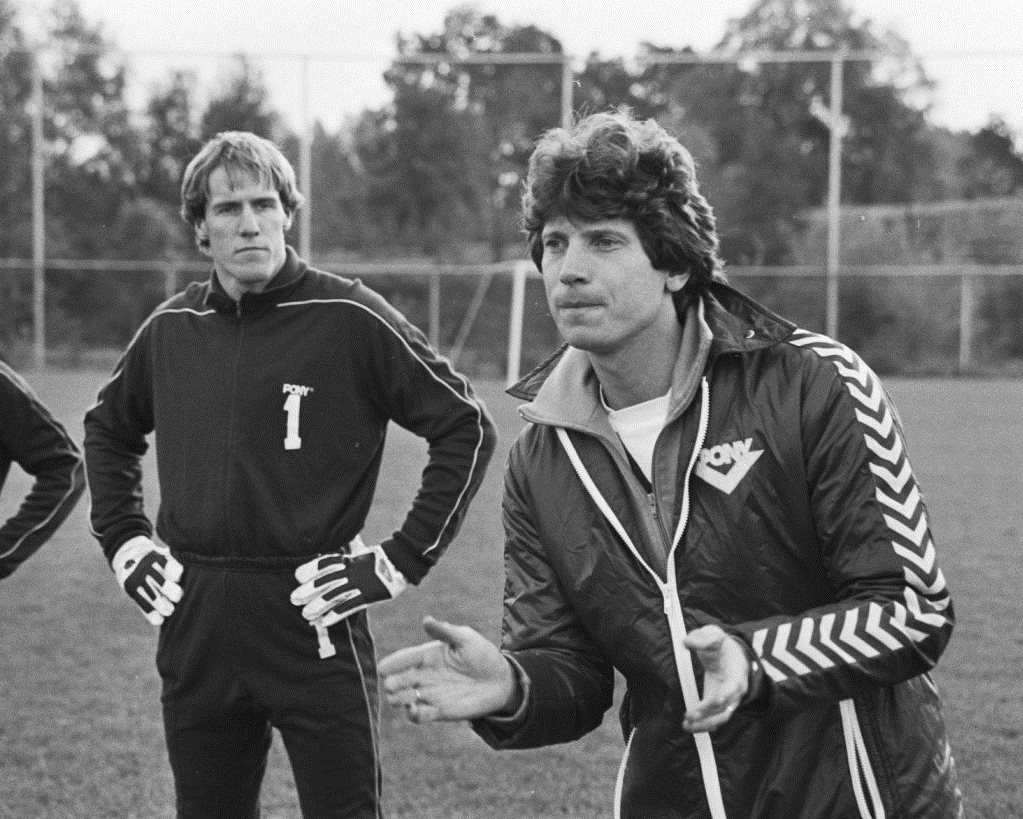
Van Breukelen and trainer Han Berger

After Peter Shilton had left Nottingham Forest, coach Brian Clough went on to pick Van Breukelen as his new goalkeeper. The club paid £200,000 to Utrecht. In his first match, he immediately kept a clean sheet in the game against Brighton & Hove Albion. After thirteen league games, he suffered an injury which would sideline him for four months. After his recovery, Van Breukelen returned in the Nottingham Forest starting line-up and the team went on to qualify for the UEFA Cup.

In the 1983–84 season, Van Breukelen played 36 league matches, keeping 11 clean sheets in the process. The team ended third, six points behind title winners Liverpool. In the UEFA Cup, Nottingham Forest were beaten in the semi-finals against Anderlecht. During the season, Nottingham Forest and Van Breukelen had increasing arguments about his frequent international call-ups. Not willing to sacrifice his spot in the Dutch team, he decided to leave England after the 1983–84 season.

=== PSV Eindhoven ===
Van Breukelen returned to his home country to play for PSV Eindhoven. In his first year, the team missed out on the Eredivisie title and were also eliminated by Van Breukelen's old team Utrecht in the semi-finals of the Dutch cup. But in the following two years, PSV did secured the league championship – Van Breukelen's first major trophies. In a match between Feyenoord and PSV in 1987, Van Breukelen was involved in an error that became known in the Netherlands as ‘het polletje van Van Breukelen’ (‘Van Breukelen's tussock’). When he bounced the ball from his hands on a clump of grass, it swirled in an unwanted direction. Van Breukelen rushed to collect the ball but this was deemed unlawful by the referee, as goalkeepers cannot repeatedly pick up the ball. The awarded last-minute free kick was converted by Feyenoord, making the score 1–1.

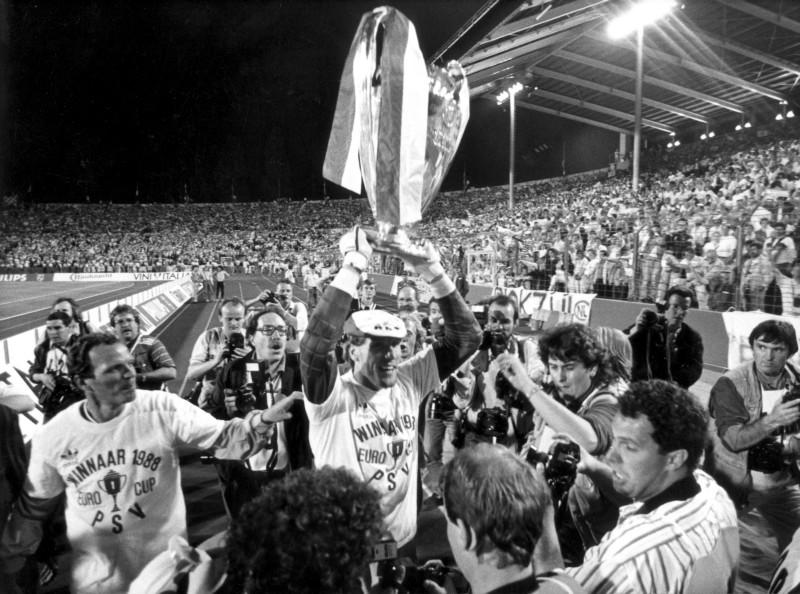
Van Breukelen celebrating with the European Cup after the match in Stuttgart

The subsequent public (and media) mockery resulted in difficult times for Van Breukelen, but he recovered in time for the 1987–88 season; the high point of his career. That year, PSV won the league title for the third time in a row, it won the KNVB Cup and the European Cup. In the European Cup final against Benfica, the match remained goalless so penalties had to decide the outcome. After PSV converted their sixth penalty, Benfica's Antonio Veloso's low kick in the left corner was parried away by Van Breukelen; a save that brought PSV the European Cup victory. For his performances, he also won the Dutch Goalkeeper of the Year award in 1988; an award he would win four times in total. In the 1988–89 season, PSV won the double yet again. Van Breukelen and PSV also won the Dutch cup in 1990 and two more league titles in 1991 and 1992.

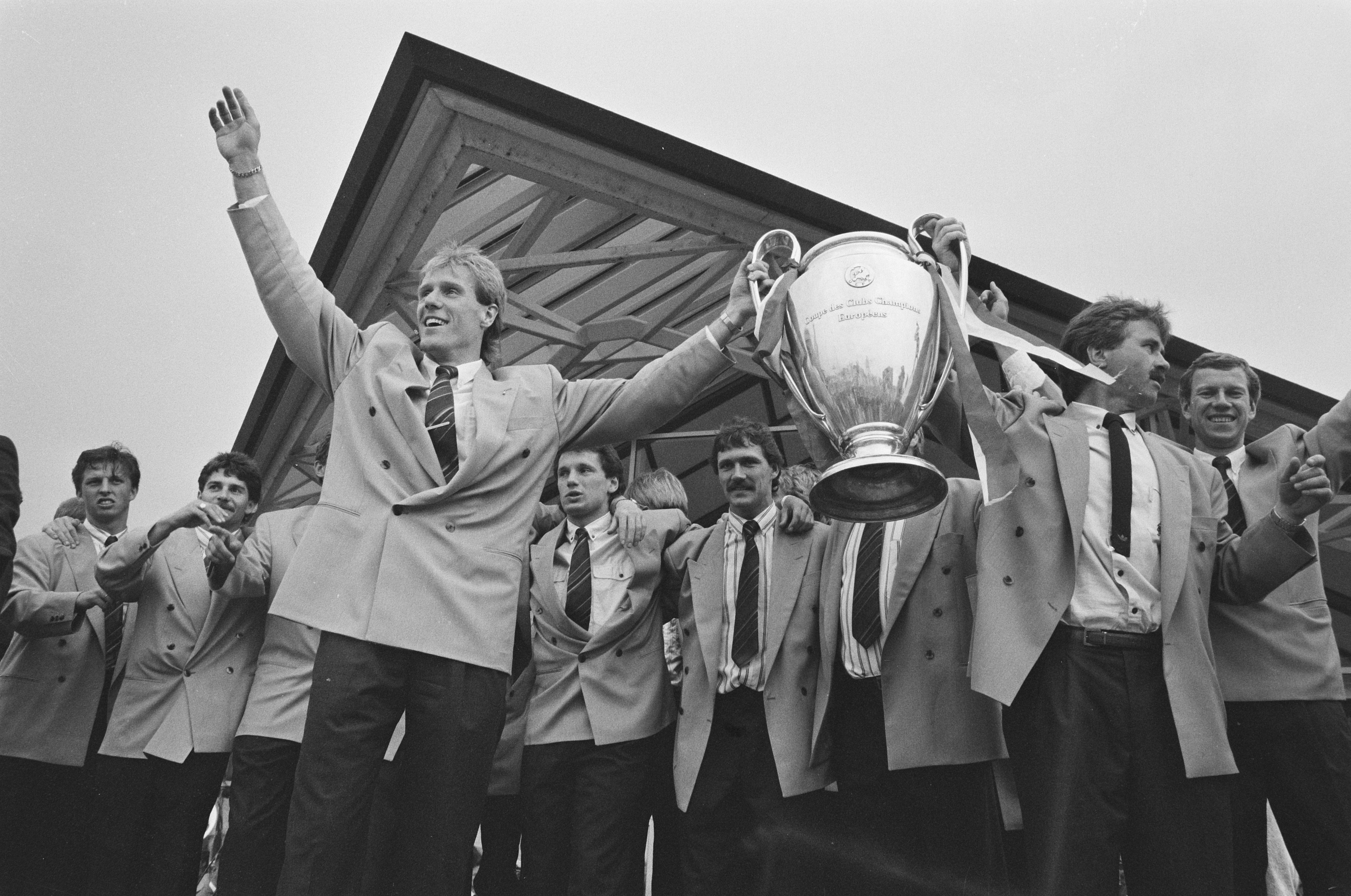
Van Breukelen and Guus Hiddink holding the European Cup on arrival at Eindhoven Airport

During the 1993–94 season, Van Breukelen publicly voiced criticism towards the behaviour of his teammate Romário. It resulted in a fine from PSV for the goalkeeper. Also, three yellow cards for minor offences caused a suspension for an important match against Ajax. In early 1994, Van Breukelen (with his retirement pending) hoped that PSV would offer him the position of general manager at the club, but PSV chose Frank Arnesen instead. He then requested the role of second goalkeeper for next season but the club also rejected that idea. Ajax offered him the second goalkeeper role, but Van Breukelen refused to play for them, and chose to retire. On 6 October 1994, Van Breukelen was honoured with a testimonial match from PSV. The European Cup-winning PSV team from 1988 played against two teams: the 1988 European Championship winning Netherlands team in the first half, and a selection of the best PSV players in history in the second half. In total, Van Breukelen represented PSV in almost 400 official matches.

== International career ==
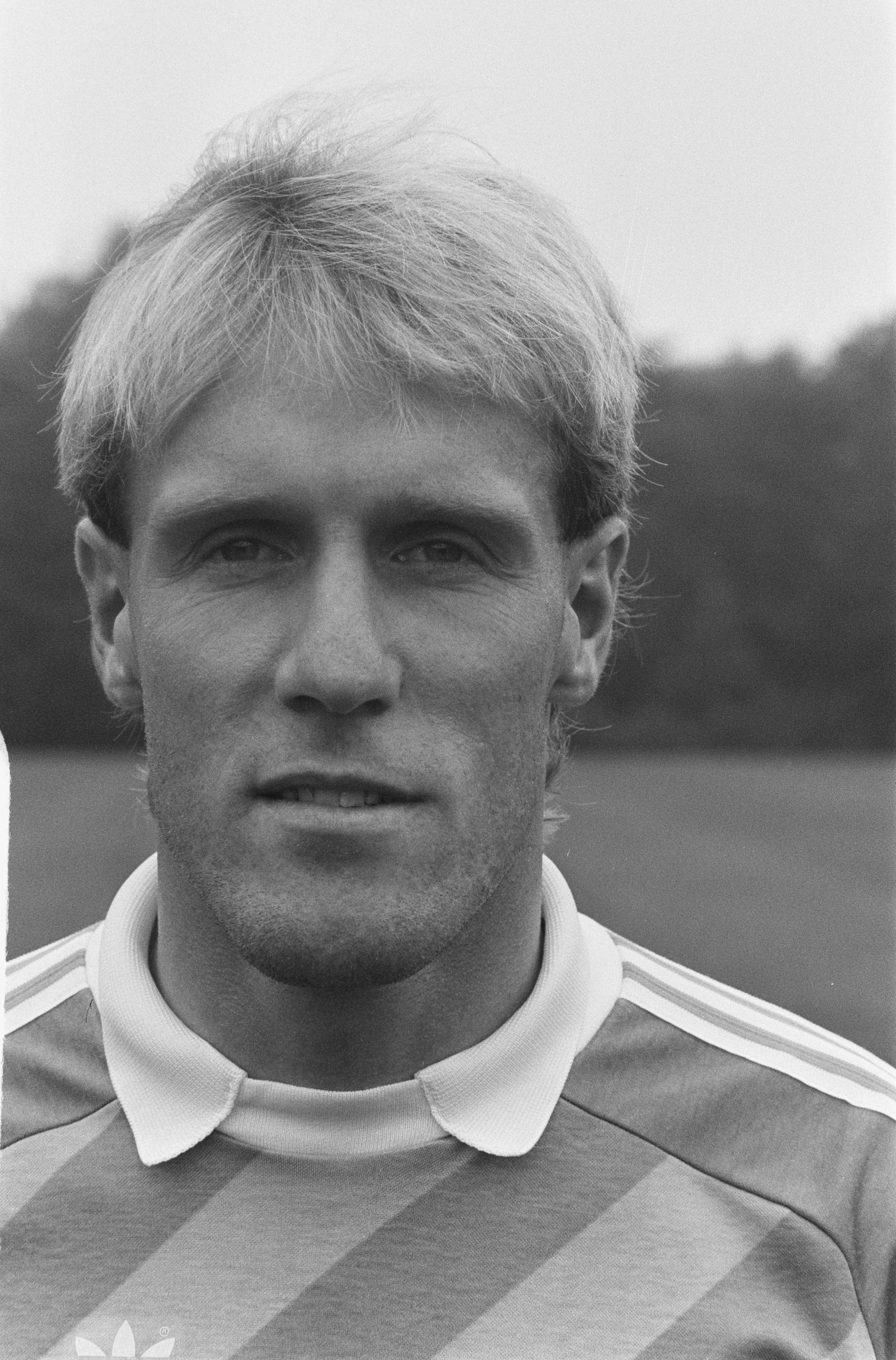
Hans van Breukelen in 1987

Van Breukelen was included in the Dutch squad for UEFA Euro 1980, but didn't play a match. He made his international debut on 11 October 1980 against West Germany. He played in qualification matches for the 1982 World Cup, Euro 1984 and the 1986 World Cup, but the Dutch team failed to qualify for any of the tournaments. In the Euro 1988 qualifiers, Van Breukelen was struggling with his form and before the qualification match against Hungary in 1987, coach Rinus Michels dropped him in favour of Joop Hiele as goalkeeper. Van Breukelen returned as the first choice in the next match. During the qualification round, he conceded only one goal in his seven matches, contributing to the first Dutch major tournament since 1980. At Euro 1988, the Netherlands narrowly progressed through the group stage but managed to beat rivals West Germany in the semi-finals (2–1). According to Van Breukelen, beating the Germans "meant more to us than reaching the European Championship Final". The Netherlands were named European champions after winning the final against the Soviet Union (2–0). Van Breukelen caused a penalty in that match, but saved the subsequent attempt by Igor Belanov. Later, he was named best goalkeeper of the tournament.

Van Breukelen and the national team qualified for the 1990 World Cup, but were knocked out by West Germany in the second round. The Dutch team endured a disastrous tournament due to a lack of unity in the squad; Van Breukelen called the World Cup "the lowest point of his career". In the West Germany match, Rudi Völler collided with Van Breukelen, who confronted Völler vocally. A brawl ensued, resulting in Völler (and Frank Rijkaard) being sent off. Meanwhile, the England match in the group stage was Van Breukelen's 54th cap, which meant he had surpassed the Dutch record number of national team appearances for a goalkeeper, held by Gejus van der Meulen. After retiring with 73 caps, that record would stand until Edwin van der Sar played his 74th game in 2003. Van Breukelen's third and last major tournament was Euro 1992, where the Netherlands advanced to the semi-finals. The team faced Denmark; a match that was lost 5–4 on penalties after a 2–2 draw, with Van Breukelen failing to stop a penalty. It turned out to be his last international match.

== Post-career ==
After Van Breukelen retired, he committed himself to the business world. From 1994 until 1997, he was vice-president of retail company Breecom. Desiring a return to football, Van Breukelen increasingly hoped for an offer from a team. Twente approached him to become their general manager in 1996, but Van Breukelen refused. In 1997, he was appointed as director of football at Utrecht. He embarked on a concept called the ‘Challenger-plan’, which stated Utrecht's style of play and main targets. Even though he signed a new contract without end date in January 2000, he left later that year after he sensed a lack of confidence from the Utrecht board.

Van Breukelen returned to his role as an entrepreneur and in 2000, he founded his own company HvB Management, specialized in conducting lectures and trainings for businesses. Later, Van Breukelen also co-founded two other companies. In October 2001, Van Breukelen got his coaching diploma 'Trainer Coach I', which enabled him to become an assistant-manager at a professional club or a manager at an amateur club. Since 2005, he served as the director of Sports and Technology, a Dutch foundation working on innovation in the two areas.

In 2009, Van Breukelen's first wife Karen died of the complications from pancreatic cancer. He supports the foundation Support Casper founded by Dutch professor and surgeon Casper van Eijck to raise awareness for the illness.

In July 2010, Van Breukelen joined the PSV Eindhoven board of directors. His appointment was endorsed by the 'Vereniging PSV' (association PSV), who have a partial say in the board membership. After his disappointment with PSV's football performances in 2013, Van Breukelen hoped to instigate a change of management direction and club culture. He contacted Guus Hiddink, several other former PSV players and sponsors to aid his cause.

In June 2016, van Breukelen was appointed technical director of the Dutch FA. He left this position in 2018.

He appeared in a 2023 episode of the television show The Masked Singer.

== Career statistics ==
=== Club ===
Appearances and goals by club, season and competition
Club	Season	League			National cup (Note: Appearances in KNVB Cup and FA Cup)		Continental		Other		Total	
Club	Season	Division	Apps	Goals	Apps	Goals	Apps	Goals	Apps	Goals	Apps	Goals
Utrecht	1976–77	Eredivisie	1	0	—		—		—		1	0
Utrecht	1977–78	Eredivisie	6	0	—		—		—		6	0
Utrecht	1978–79	Eredivisie	32	0	2	0	—		—		34	0
Utrecht	1979–80	Eredivisie	34	0	2	0	—		—		36	0
Utrecht	1980–81	Eredivisie	34	0	2	0	4 (Note: Appearances in UEFA Cup)	0	—		40	0
Utrecht	1981–82	Eredivisie	33	0	8	0	2	0	—		43	0
Utrecht	1982–83	Eredivisie	2	0	—		—		—		2	0
Utrecht	Total		142	0	14	0	6	0	—		162	0
Nottingham Forest	1982–83	First Division	25	0	—		—		—		25	0
Nottingham Forest	1983–84	First Division	36	0	—		8	0	—		44	0
Nottingham Forest	Total		61	0	—		8	0	—		69	0
PSV Eindhoven	1984–85	Eredivisie	32	0	8	0	4	0	—		44	0
PSV Eindhoven	1985–86	Eredivisie	34	0	2	0	4	0	—		40	0
PSV Eindhoven	1986–87	Eredivisie	33	0	3	0	2 (Note: Appearances in European Cup/Champions League)	0	—		38	0
PSV Eindhoven	1987–88	Eredivisie	33	0	6	0	9	0	—		48	0
PSV Eindhoven	1988–89	Eredivisie	22	0	3	0	2	0	—		27	0
PSV Eindhoven	1989–90	Eredivisie	32	0	5	0	6	0	—		43	0
PSV Eindhoven	1990–91	Eredivisie	32	0	4	0	2 (Note: Appearances in UEFA Cup Winners' Cup)	0	—		38	0
PSV Eindhoven	1991–92	Eredivisie	32	0	2	0	4	0	1 (Note: Appearance in Dutch Supercup/Johan Cruyff Shield)	0	39	0
PSV Eindhoven	1992–93	Eredivisie	26	0	2	0	9	0	1	0	38	0
PSV Eindhoven	1993–94	Eredivisie	33	0	2	0	2	0	—		37	0
PSV Eindhoven	Total		309	0	37	0	44	0	2	0	392	0
Career total			512	0	51	0	58	0	2	0	623	0

=== International ===
Appearances and goals by national team and year
National team	Year	Apps	Goals
Netherlands	1980	1	0
Netherlands	1981	3	0
Netherlands	1982	5	0
Netherlands	1983	2	0
Netherlands	1984	3	0
Netherlands	1985	6	0
Netherlands	1986	6	0
Netherlands	1987	7	0
Netherlands	1988	10	0
Netherlands	1989	5	0
Netherlands	1990	12	0
Netherlands	1991	5	0
Netherlands	1992	8	0
Total		73	0

== Honours ==
PSV Eindhoven

- Eredivisie (6): 1985–86, 1986–87, 1987–88, 1988–89, 1990–91, 1991–92
- KNVB Cup: 1987–88, 1988–89, 1989–90
- Johan Cruyff Shield: 1992
- European Cup: 1987–88

Netherlands

- UEFA European Championship: 1988

Individual

- Dutch Goalkeeper of the Year: 1987, 1988, 1991, 1992
- UEFA European Championship Team of the Tournament: 1988
- IFFHS World's Best Goalkeeper: Silver ball 1988
- IFFHS World's Best Goalkeeper: Bronze ball 1992
