= UEFA Euro 1992 statistics =

These are the statistics for the Euro 1992 in Sweden.

== Goalscorers ==
There were 32 goals scored in 15 matches, for an average of 2.13 goals per match.

3 goals

- (Denmark) Henrik Larsen
- (Germany) Karl-Heinz Riedle
- (Netherlands) Dennis Bergkamp
- (Sweden) Tomas Brolin

2 goals

- (France) Jean-Pierre Papin
- (Germany) Thomas Häßler
- (Netherlands) Frank Rijkaard
- (Sweden) Jan Eriksson

1 goal

- (Commonwealth of Independent States) Igor Dobrovolski
- (Denmark) Lars Elstrup
- (Denmark) John Jensen
- (Denmark) Kim Vilfort
- (England) David Platt
- (Germany) Stefan Effenberg
- (Germany) Jürgen Klinsmann
- (Netherlands) Rob Witschge
- (Scotland) Gary McAllister
- (Scotland) Brian McClair
- (Scotland) Paul McStay
- (Sweden) Kennet Andersson

Source: UEFA

== Awards ==
UEFA Team of the Tournament

Goalkeeper	Defenders	Midfielders	Forwards
(Denmark) Peter Schmeichel	(France) Jocelyn Angloma (France) Laurent Blanc (Germany) Andreas Brehme (Germany) Jürgen Kohler	(Denmark) Brian Laudrup (Germany) Stefan Effenberg (Germany) Thomas Häßler (Netherlands) Ruud Gullit	(Netherlands) Dennis Bergkamp (Netherlands) Marco van Basten

== Scoring ==
- Total number of goals scored: 32
- Average goals per match: 2.13
- Top scorer: Dennis Bergkamp, Tomas Brolin, Henrik Larsen, Karl-Heinz Riedle (3 goals)
- Most goals scored by a team: 7 – Germany
- Fewest goals scored by a team: 1 – CIS, England
- Most goals conceded by a team: 8 – Germany
- Fewest goals conceded by a team: 2 – England
- First goal of the tournament: Jan Eriksson against France
- Last goal of the tournament: Kim Vilfort against Germany
- Fastest goal in a match: 3 minutes and 4 seconds: Frank Rijkaard (for the Netherlands against Germany)
- No late goals were scored during a match with extra time.
- Latest goal in a match without extra time: 90 minutes: Thomas Häßler (for Germany against the CIS)
- No hat-tricks were scored during the tournament.
- Most goals scored by one player in a match: 2 – Karl-Heinz Riedle against Sweden, Henrik Larsen against Netherlands
- No own goals were scored during the tournament.

== Attendance ==
- Overall attendance: 430,111
- Average attendance per match: 28,674
- Highest attendance: 37,800 – Denmark vs Germany (Final)
- Lowest attendance: 14,660 – Scotland vs CIS (Group 2)

== Wins, draws and losses ==
- Most wins: 3 – Denmark
- Fewest wins: 0 – CIS, England, France
- Most losses: 2 – Germany, Scotland
- Fewest losses: 1 – Denmark, Netherlands, Sweden
- Most draws: 2 - CIS, England, France
- Fewest draws: 0 - Scotland

== Discipline ==
Sanctions against foul play at UEFA Euro 1992 are in the first instance the responsibility of the referee, but when he deems it necessary to give a caution, or dismiss a player, UEFA keeps a record and may enforce a suspension. Referee decisions are generally seen as final. However, UEFA's disciplinary committee may additionally penalise players for offences unpunished by the referee.

=== Overview ===
==== Red cards ====
A player receiving a red card is automatically suspended for the next match. A longer suspension is possible if the UEFA disciplinary committee judges the offence as warranting it. In keeping with the FIFA Disciplinary Code (FDC) and UEFA Disciplinary Regulations (UDR), UEFA does not allow for appeals of red cards except in the case of mistaken identity. The FDC further stipulates that if a player is sent off during his team's final Euro 1996 match, the suspension carries over to his team's next competitive international(s). For Euro 1992 these were the qualification matches for the 1994 FIFA World Cup.

Any player who was suspended due to a red card that was earned in Euro 1992 qualifying was required to serve the balance of any suspension unserved by the end of qualifying either in the Euro 1992 finals (for any player on a team that qualified, whether he had been selected to the final squad or not) or in World Cup qualifying (for players on teams that did not qualify).

==== Yellow cards ====
Any player receiving a single yellow card during two of the three group stage matches plus the quarter-final match was suspended for the next match. A single yellow card does not carry over to the semi-finals. This means that no player will be suspended for final unless he gets sent off in semi-final or he is serving a longer suspension for an earlier incident. Suspensions due to yellow cards will not carry over to the World Cup qualifiers. Yellow cards and any related suspensions earned in the Euro 1992 qualifiers are neither counted nor enforced in the final tournament.

In the event a player is sent off for two bookable offences, only the red card is counted for disciplinary purposes. However, in the event a player receives a direct red card after being booked in the same match, then both cards are counted. If the player was already facing a suspension for two tournament bookings when he was sent off, this would result in separate suspensions that would be served consecutively. The one match ban for the yellow cards would be served first unless the player's team is eliminated in the match in which he was sent off. If the player's team is eliminated in the match in which he was serving his ban for the yellow cards, then the ban for the sending off would be carried over to the World Cup qualifiers.

==== Additional punishment ====
For serious transgressions, a longer suspension may be handed down at the discretion of the UEFA disciplinary committee. The disciplinary committee is also charged with reviewing any incidents that were missed by the officials and can award administrative red cards and suspensions accordingly. However, just as appeals of red cards are not considered, the disciplinary committee is also not allowed to review transgressions that were already punished by the referee with something less than a red card. For example, if a player is booked but not sent off for a dangerous tackle, the disciplinary committee cannot subsequently deem the challenge to be violent conduct and then upgrade the card to a red. However, if the same player then spits at the opponent but is still not sent off, then the referee's report would be unlikely to mention this automatic red card offence. Video evidence of the spitting incident could then be independently reviewed.

Unlike the rules in many domestic competitions, there is no particular category of red card offence that automatically results in a multi-game suspension. In general however, extended bans are only assessed for red cards given for serious foul play, violent conduct, spitting or perhaps foul and abusive language. Also, unlike many sets of domestic rules second and subsequent red cards also do not automatically incur an extended ban, although a player's past disciplinary record (including prior competition) might be considered by the disciplinary committee when punishing him. As a rule, only automatic red card offenses are considered for longer bans. A player who gets sent off for picking up two yellow cards in the same match will not have his automatic one-match ban extended by UEFA on account of what he did to get the second booking, because the referee has deemed him as not to have committed an automatic red card offense.

If UEFA suspends a player after his team's elimination from the tournament, or for more games than the team ends up playing without him prior to the final or their elimination (whichever comes first), then the remaining suspension must be served during World Cup qualifying. For a particularly grave offence UEFA has the power to impose a lengthy ban against the offender.

=== Disciplinary statistics ===
- Total number of yellow cards: 51
- Average yellow cards per match: 3.40
- No red cards were given during the tournament.
- First yellow card: Jocelyn Angloma against Sweden
- No players were sent off during the tournament.
- Most yellow cards: 11 – Germany
- Fewest yellow cards: 2 – Scotland

=== By individual ===
==== Red cards ====
No red cards were shown over the course of the tournament's 15 matches.

==== Yellow cards ====
51 yellow cards were shown over the course of the tournament's 15 matches, an average of 3.40 yellow cards per match.

2 yellow cards

- (Commonwealth of Independent States) Akhrik Tsveiba
- (Denmark) Henrik Andersen
- (England) Tony Daley
- (Germany) Stefan Effenberg
- (Germany) Thomas Häßler
- (Germany) Stefan Reuter
- (Scotland) Stuart McCall
- (Sweden) Patrik Andersson
- (Sweden) Stefan Schwarz

1 yellow card

- (Commonwealth of Independent States) Andrei Chernyshov
- (Commonwealth of Independent States) Igor Dobrovolski
- (Commonwealth of Independent States) Dmitri Kharine
- (Commonwealth of Independent States) Dmitri Kuznetsov
- (Commonwealth of Independent States) Alexei Mikhailichenko
- (Denmark) Torben Frank
- (Denmark) Torben Piechnik
- (Denmark) Flemming Povlsen
- (Denmark) John Sivebæk
- (England) David Batty
- (England) Keith Curle
- (England) Martin Keown
- (England) Neil Webb
- (France) Basile Boli
- (France) Eric Cantona
- (France) Bernard Casoni
- (France) Didier Deschamps
- (France) Luis Fernandez
- (France) Christian Perez
- (Germany) Guido Buchwald
- (Germany) Thomas Doll
- (Germany) Jürgen Klinsmann
- (Germany) Jürgen Köhler
- (Germany) Karl-Heinz Riedle
- (Netherlands) Ronald Koeman
- (Netherlands) Frank Rijkaard
- (Netherlands) Rob Witschge
- (Netherlands) Jan Wouters
- (Netherlands) Richard Witschge
- (Sweden) Joachim Björklund
- (Sweden) Martin Dahlin
- (Sweden) Roger Ljung
- (Sweden) Jonas Thern

=== By referee ===
Referee	Red	Yellow	Red Cards
(Switzerland) Bruno Galler	0	6	
(Italy) Tullio Lanese	0	6	
(Austria) Hubert Forstinger	0	5	
(Portugal) José Rosa dos Santos	0	5	
(Netherlands) John Blankenstein	0	4	
(Switzerland) Kurt Röthlisberger	0	4	
(France) Gérard Biguet	0	3	
(Denmark) Peter Mikkelsen	0	3	
(Belgium) Guy Goethals	0	2	
(Hungary) Sándor Puhl	0	2	
(Commonwealth of Independent States) Alexey Spirin	0	2	
(Germany) Aron Schmidhuber	0	2	
(Spain) Emilio Soriano Aladren	0	2	
(Sweden) Bo Karlsson	0	1	
(Italy) Pierluigi Pairetto	0	1	

=== By team ===
Team	Matches	Red	Yellow	Red Cards	Suspensions
Denmark	5	0	6		H. Andersen vs Germany (final)
Sweden	4	0	8		S. Schwarz vs Germany (semi-final); P. Andersson vs Germany (semi-final)
Netherlands	4	0	4		
Germany	3	0	11		T. Häßler; S. Effenberg; S. Reuter
England	3	0	9		T. Daley vs Norway (WCQ)
CIS	3	0	7		A. Tsveiba vs Scotland
France	3	0	5		
Scotland	3	0	1		S. McCall vs Switzerland (WCQ)

== Clean sheets ==
- Most clean sheets: 2 – Denmark, Netherlands, England
- Fewest clean sheets: 0 – Denmark, Germany, Sweden
