= UEFA Euro 1992 Group 1 =

Football tournament group stage

Group 1 of UEFA Euro 1992 was one of only two groups in the final tournament's initial group stage. It began on 10 June and was completed on 17 June. The group consisted of hosts Sweden, fellow Scandinavians Denmark, France and England.

In the opening game between Sweden and France, Sweden took the lead with a Jan Eriksson header from a corner; France equalised in the second half with a right-footed shot from Jean-Pierre Papin. The Denmark–England and France–England games both ended scoreless, although John Jensen hit the post for Denmark against England, and Stuart Pearce did likewise for England against France, before Sweden defeated Denmark 1–0. In the last two games, England played Sweden and took the lead in the first half when David Platt volleyed in from a cross. In the second half, Sweden came back to win with another Jan Eriksson header from a corner and a shot from Tomas Brolin from the edge of the box after a one-two with Martin Dahlin. Gary Lineker was taken off in the second half of the game, replaced by Alan Smith; it was his last game for England (and, as it turned out, Smith's as well), and he was withdrawn with half an hour to go despite the fact that, regardless of how the other match finished (at the time both games were at 1-1), England would need at least one more goal - a third draw would not be enough - and Lineker was England's second-highest goalscorer in history, and moreover had provided the cross for Platt's goal. In the concurrent match, Denmark also scored a late goal, beating France 2–1 to take the second spot in the knockout stage.

Sweden won the group and advanced to the semi-finals along with Denmark. France and England were eliminated. England's manager Graham Taylor was greeted by the famous newspaper headline "SWEDES 2 TURNIPS 1", with his face superimposed on a picture of a turnip. Lineker, who had previously announced his intention to retire after the tournament, did so.

== Teams ==
Team	Method of qualification	Date of qualification	Finals appearance	Last appearance	Previous best performance
Denmark	Group 4 runner-up (Note: Replaced FR Yugoslavia (after qualifying as Yugoslavia), who were subject to sanctions under UN Security Council Resolution 757 and thus banned from appearing.)	31 May 1992	4th	1988	Fourth place (1964), Semi-finals (1984)
England	Group 7 winner	13 November 1991	4th	1988	Third place (1968)
France	Group 1 winner	12 October 1991	3rd	1984	Winners (1984)
Sweden	Host	16 December 1988	1st	—	Debut

== Standings ==
Pos	Team	Pld	W	D	L	GF	GA	GD	Pts	Qualification
1	Sweden (H)	3	2	1	0	4	2	+2	5	Advance to knockout stage
2	Denmark	3	1	1	1	2	2	0	3	Advance to knockout stage
3	France	3	0	2	1	2	3	−1	2	
4	England	3	0	2	1	1	2	−1	2	

Source: UEFA
Rules for classification: Group stage tiebreakers
(H) Hosts

In the semi-finals,

- The winner of Group 1, Sweden, advanced to play the runner-up of Group 2, Germany.
- The runner-up of Group 1, Denmark, advanced to play the winner of Group 2, Netherlands.

== Matches ==
=== Sweden vs France ===
10 June 1992
20:15

Sweden	1–1	France
J. Eriksson 24'	Report	Papin 58'

Råsunda Stadium, Solna
Attendance: 29,860
Referee: Alexey Spirin (CIS)

Sweden	France

GK	1	Thomas Ravelli
RB	2	Roland Nilsson
CB	3	Jan Eriksson
CB	4	Patrik Andersson
LB	5	Joachim Björklund
RM	7	Klas Ingesson
CM	9	Jonas Thern (c)	(yellow card) 87'
CM	6	Stefan Schwarz	(yellow card) 39'
LM	10	Anders Limpar
CF	11	Tomas Brolin
CF	16	Kennet Andersson		(substituted off) 74'
Substitutions:
FW	17	Martin Dahlin		(substituted on) 74'
Manager:
Tommy Svensson

GK	1	Bruno Martini
SW	5	Laurent Blanc
RB	20	Jocelyn Angloma	(yellow card) 35'	(substituted off) 66'
CB	13	Basile Boli
CB	6	Bernard Casoni
LB	2	Manuel Amoros (c)
CM	8	Franck Sauzée
CM	7	Didier Deschamps
CM	16	Pascal Vahirua		(substituted off) 46'
CF	18	Eric Cantona	(yellow card) 53'
CF	9	Jean-Pierre Papin
Substitutions:
MF	11	Christian Perez		(substituted on) 46'
MF	10	Luis Fernandez		(substituted on) 66'
Manager:
Michel Platini

Linesmen:
Victor Filippov (CIS)
Andrei Butenko (CIS)
Fourth official:
Vadim Zhuk (CIS)

=== Denmark vs England ===
11 June 1992
20:15

Denmark	0–0	England
	Report

Malmö Stadion, Malmö
Attendance: 26,385
Referee: John Blankenstein (Netherlands)

Denmark	England

GK	1	Peter Schmeichel
SW	4	Lars Olsen (c)
CB	3	Kent Nielsen
CB	6	Kim Christofte
RWB	2	John Sivebæk	(yellow card) 83'
LWB	5	Henrik Andersen
CM	18	Kim Vilfort
CM	7	John Jensen
CM	11	Brian Laudrup
CF	15	Bent Christensen
CF	9	Flemming Povlsen
Manager:
Richard Møller Nielsen

GK	1	Chris Woods
RB	2	Keith Curle	(yellow card) 9'	(substituted off) 62'
CB	4	Martin Keown	(yellow card) 7'
CB	5	Des Walker
LB	3	Stuart Pearce
RM	8	Trevor Steven
CM	7	David Platt
CM	12	Carlton Palmer
LM	16	Paul Merson		(substituted off) 71'
CF	10	Gary Lineker (c)
CF	17	Alan Smith
Substitutions:
MF	18	Tony Daley	(yellow card) 67'	(substituted on) 62'
MF	15	Neil Webb		(substituted on) 71'
Manager:
Graham Taylor

Linesmen:
Jan Dolstra (Netherlands)
Robert Overkleeft (Netherlands)
Fourth official:
Mario van der Ende (Netherlands)

=== France vs England ===
14 June 1992
17:15

France	0–0	England
	Report

Malmö Stadion, Malmö
Attendance: 26,535
Referee: Sándor Puhl (Hungary)

France	England

GK	1	Bruno Martini
SW	5	Laurent Blanc
CB	13	Basile Boli
CB	6	Bernard Casoni
RWB	2	Manuel Amoros (c)
LWB	14	Jean-Philippe Durand
CM	7	Didier Deschamps
CM	10	Luis Fernandez	(yellow card) 31'	(substituted off) 75'
CM	8	Franck Sauzée		(substituted off) 46'
CF	9	Jean-Pierre Papin
CF	18	Eric Cantona
Substitutions:
DF	20	Jocelyn Angloma		(substituted on) 46'
MF	11	Christian Perez		(substituted on) 75'
Manager:
Michel Platini

GK	1	Chris Woods
SW	12	Carlton Palmer
CB	4	Martin Keown
CB	5	Des Walker
CB	3	Stuart Pearce
RM	8	Trevor Steven
CM	19	David Batty	(yellow card) 69'
CM	7	David Platt
LM	11	Andy Sinton
CF	10	Gary Lineker (c)
CF	20	Alan Shearer
Manager:
Graham Taylor

Linesmen:
László Varga (Hungary)
Sándor Szilágyi (Hungary)
Fourth official:
Sándor Varga (Hungary)

=== Sweden vs Denmark ===
14 June 1992
20:15

Sweden	1–0	Denmark
Brolin 58'	Report

Råsunda Stadium, Solna
Attendance: 29,902
Referee: Aron Schmidhuber (Germany)

Sweden	Denmark

GK	1	Thomas Ravelli
RB	2	Roland Nilsson
CB	3	Jan Eriksson
CB	4	Patrik Andersson	(yellow card) 40'
LB	5	Joachim Björklund
RM	7	Klas Ingesson
CM	9	Jonas Thern (c)
CM	6	Stefan Schwarz
LM	10	Anders Limpar		(substituted off) 90'
CF	11	Tomas Brolin
CF	17	Martin Dahlin		(substituted off) 77'
Substitutions:
FW	20	Johnny Ekström		(substituted on) 77'
DF	14	Magnus Erlingmark		(substituted on) 90'
Manager:
Tommy Svensson

GK	1	Peter Schmeichel
SW	4	Lars Olsen (c)
CB	3	Kent Nielsen
CB	6	Kim Christofte
RWB	2	John Sivebæk
LWB	5	Henrik Andersen	(yellow card) 14'
CM	18	Kim Vilfort
CM	7	John Jensen		(substituted off) 63'
CM	11	Brian Laudrup
CF	9	Flemming Povlsen
CF	15	Bent Christensen		(substituted off) 51'
Substitutions:
FW	14	Torben Frank		(substituted on) 51'
MF	13	Henrik Larsen		(substituted on) 63'
Manager:
Richard Møller Nielsen

Linesmen:
Joachim Ren (Germany)
Uwe Ennuschat (Germany)
Fourth official:
Karl-Josef Assenmacher (Germany)

=== Sweden vs England ===
17 June 1992
20:15

Sweden	2–1	England
J. Eriksson 51'; Brolin 82'	Report	Platt 4'

Råsunda Stadium, Solna
Attendance: 30,126
Referee: José Rosa dos Santos (Portugal)

Sweden	England

GK	1	Thomas Ravelli
RB	2	Roland Nilsson
CB	3	Jan Eriksson
CB	4	Patrik Andersson	(yellow card) 43'
LB	5	Joachim Björklund	(yellow card) 70'
RM	7	Klas Ingesson
CM	9	Jonas Thern (c)
CM	6	Stefan Schwarz	(yellow card) 69'
LM	10	Anders Limpar		(substituted off) 46'
CF	11	Tomas Brolin
CF	17	Martin Dahlin
Substitutions:
FW	20	Johnny Ekström		(substituted on) 46'
Manager:
Tommy Svensson

GK	1	Chris Woods
RB	19	David Batty
CB	4	Martin Keown
CB	5	Des Walker
LB	3	Stuart Pearce
RM	18	Tony Daley	(yellow card) 10'
CM	15	Neil Webb	(yellow card) 81'
CM	12	Carlton Palmer
CM	7	David Platt
LM	11	Andy Sinton		(substituted off) 76'
CF	10	Gary Lineker (c)		(substituted off) 62'
Substitutions:
FW	17	Alan Smith		(substituted on) 62'
MF	16	Paul Merson		(substituted on) 76'
Manager:
Graham Taylor

Linesmen:
Valdemar Aguiar Pinto Lopes (Portugal)
Antonio Guedes Gomes De Carvalho (Portugal)
Fourth official:
Jorge Emanuel Monteiro Coroado (Portugal)

=== France vs Denmark ===
17 June 1992
20:15

France	1–2	Denmark
Papin 60'	Report	Larsen 8'; Elstrup 78'

Malmö Stadion, Malmö
Attendance: 25,763
Referee: Hubert Forstinger (Austria)

France	Denmark

GK	1	Bruno Martini
SW	5	Laurent Blanc
CB	13	Basile Boli	(yellow card) 38'
CB	6	Bernard Casoni	(yellow card) 15'
RWB	2	Manuel Amoros (c)
LWB	16	Pascal Vahirua		(substituted off) 46'
CM	7	Didier Deschamps	(yellow card) 73'
CM	11	Christian Perez	(yellow card) 32'	(substituted off) 79'
CM	14	Jean-Philippe Durand
CF	18	Eric Cantona
CF	9	Jean-Pierre Papin
Substitutions:
MF	10	Luis Fernandez		(substituted on) 46'
MF	12	Christophe Cocard		(substituted on) 79'
Manager:
Michel Platini

GK	1	Peter Schmeichel
SW	4	Lars Olsen (c)
CB	6	Kim Christofte
CB	3	Kent Nielsen		(substituted off) 61'
RWB	2	John Sivebæk
LWB	5	Henrik Andersen
CM	7	John Jensen
CM	11	Brian Laudrup		(substituted off) 66'
CM	13	Henrik Larsen
CF	9	Flemming Povlsen	(yellow card) 14'
CF	14	Torben Frank	(yellow card) 45'
Substitutions:
DF	12	Torben Piechnik		(substituted on) 61'
FW	10	Lars Elstrup		(substituted on) 66'
Manager:
Richard Møller Nielsen

Linesmen:
Johann Möstl (Austria)
Alois Pemmer (Austria)
Fourth official:
Gerhard Kapl (Austria)

== See also ==
- Denmark at the UEFA European Championship
- England at the UEFA European Championship
- France at the UEFA European Championship
- Sweden at the UEFA European Championship
