= UEFA Euro 1992 knockout stage =

International football tournament stage

The knockout stage of UEFA Euro 1992 was a single-elimination tournament involving the four teams that qualified from the group stage of the tournament. There were two rounds of matches: a semi-final stage leading to the final to decide the champions. The knockout stage began with the semi-finals on 21 June and ended with the final on 26 June 1992 at the Ullevi in Gothenburg. Denmark won the tournament with a 2–0 victory over Germany.

All times Central European Summer Time (UTC+2)

== Format ==
Any game in the knockout stage that was undecided by the end of the regular 90 minutes was followed by thirty minutes of extra time (two 15-minute halves). If scores were still level after 30 minutes of extra time, there would be a penalty shootout (at least five penalties each, and more if necessary) to determine who progressed to the next round. As with every tournament since UEFA Euro 1984, there was no third place play-off.

== Qualified teams ==
The top two placed teams from each of the two groups qualified for the knockout stage.

Group	Winners	Runners-up
1	Sweden	Denmark
2	Netherlands	Germany

== Bracket ==
Semi-finals
22 June – Gothenburg
Netherlands	2 (4)
Denmark (p)	2 (5)
21 June – Solna
Sweden	2
Germany	3

Final
26 June – Gothenburg
Denmark	2
Germany	0

== Semi-finals ==
=== Sweden vs Germany ===
21 June 1992
20:15

Sweden	2–3	Germany
Brolin 64' (pen.); K. Andersson 89'	Report	Häßler 11'; Riedle 59', 88'

Råsunda Stadium, Solna
Attendance: 28,827
Referee: Tullio Lanese (Italy)

Sweden	Germany

GK	1	Thomas Ravelli
RB	2	Roland Nilsson
CB	3	Jan Eriksson
CB	5	Joachim Björklund
LB	18	Roger Ljung	(yellow card) 14'
RM	16	Kennet Andersson
CM	7	Klas Ingesson
CM	9	Jonas Thern (c)
LM	19	Joakim Nilsson		(substituted off) 58'
CF	11	Tomas Brolin
CF	17	Martin Dahlin	(yellow card) 72'	(substituted off) 73'
Substitutions:
MF	10	Anders Limpar		(substituted on) 58'
FW	20	Johnny Ekström		(substituted on) 73'
Manager:
Tommy Svensson

GK	1	Bodo Illgner
SW	14	Thomas Helmer
CB	4	Jürgen Kohler
CB	6	Guido Buchwald	(yellow card) 35'
RWB	2	Stefan Reuter	(yellow card) 43'
LWB	3	Andreas Brehme (c)
CM	16	Matthias Sammer
CM	17	Stefan Effenberg	(yellow card) 3'
AM	8	Thomas Häßler
CF	11	Karl-Heinz Riedle	(yellow card) 29'
CF	18	Jürgen Klinsmann		(substituted off) 89'
Substitutions:
MF	10	Thomas Doll		(substituted on) 89'
Manager:
Berti Vogts

Linesmen:
Domenico Ramicone (Italy)
Maurizio Padovan (Italy)
Fourth official:
Pierluigi Pairetto (Italy)

=== Netherlands vs Denmark ===
22 June 1992
20:15

Netherlands	2–2 (a.e.t.)	Denmark
Bergkamp 23'; Rijkaard 86'	Report	Larsen 5', 33'
Penalties
Koeman (penalty scored); Van Basten (penalty missed); Bergkamp (penalty scored); Rijkaard (penalty scored); Witschge (penalty scored)	4–5	(penalty scored) Larsen; (penalty scored) Povlsen; (penalty scored) Elstrup; (penalty scored) Vilfort; (penalty scored) Christofte

Ullevi, Gothenburg
Attendance: 37,450
Referee: Emilio Soriano Aladrén (Spain)

Netherlands	Denmark

GK	1	Hans van Breukelen
SW	4	Ronald Koeman
CB	10	Ruud Gullit (c)
CB	17	Frank de Boer		(substituted off) 46'
CB	3	Adri van Tiggelen
RM	20	Bryan Roy		(substituted off) 115'
CM	8	Frank Rijkaard	(yellow card) 42'
CM	6	Jan Wouters
LM	14	Rob Witschge
CF	7	Dennis Bergkamp
CF	9	Marco van Basten
Substitutions:
FW	12	Wim Kieft		(substituted on) 46'
MF	11	John van 't Schip		(substituted on) 115'
Manager:
Rinus Michels

GK	1	Peter Schmeichel
RB	2	John Sivebæk
CB	12	Torben Piechnik
CB	4	Lars Olsen (c)
LB	5	Henrik Andersen	(yellow card) 15'	(substituted off) 70'
RM	6	Kim Christofte
CM	7	John Jensen
CM	18	Kim Vilfort
LM	13	Henrik Larsen
SS	11	Brian Laudrup		(substituted off) 57'
CF	9	Flemming Povlsen
Substitutions:
FW	10	Lars Elstrup		(substituted on) 57'
DF	17	Claus Christiansen		(substituted on) 70'
Manager:
Richard Møller Nielsen

Linesmen:
Francisco García Pacheco (Spain)
José Luis Iglesia Casas (Spain)

== Final ==
26 June 1992
20:15

Denmark	2–0	Germany
Jensen 18'; Vilfort 78'	Report

Ullevi, Gothenburg
Attendance: 37,800
Referee: Bruno Galler (Switzerland)

Denmark	Germany

GK	1	Peter Schmeichel
CB	4	Lars Olsen (c)
CB	12	Torben Piechnik	(yellow card) 32'
CB	3	Kent Nielsen
RWB	2	John Sivebæk		(substituted off) 66'
LWB	6	Kim Christofte
CM	7	John Jensen
CM	18	Kim Vilfort
AM	13	Henrik Larsen
SS	11	Brian Laudrup
CF	9	Flemming Povlsen
Substitutions:
DF	17	Claus Christiansen		(substituted on) 66'
Manager:
Richard Møller Nielsen

GK	1	Bodo Illgner
SW	6	Guido Buchwald
CB	4	Jürgen Kohler
CB	14	Thomas Helmer
RWB	2	Stefan Reuter	(yellow card) 55'
LWB	3	Andreas Brehme (c)
CM	16	Matthias Sammer		(substituted off) 46'
CM	17	Stefan Effenberg	(yellow card) 35'	(substituted off) 80'
AM	8	Thomas Häßler	(yellow card) 39'
CF	11	Karl-Heinz Riedle
CF	18	Jürgen Klinsmann	(yellow card) 88'
Substitutions:
MF	10	Thomas Doll	(yellow card) 83'	(substituted on) 46'
FW	13	Andreas Thom		(substituted on) 80'
Manager:
Berti Vogts

Linesmen:
Zivanko Popović (Switzerland)
Paul Wyttenbach (Switzerland)
Fourth official:
Kurt Röthlisberger (Switzerland)
