= UEFA Euro 1992 final =

Final game of the UEFA Euro 1992

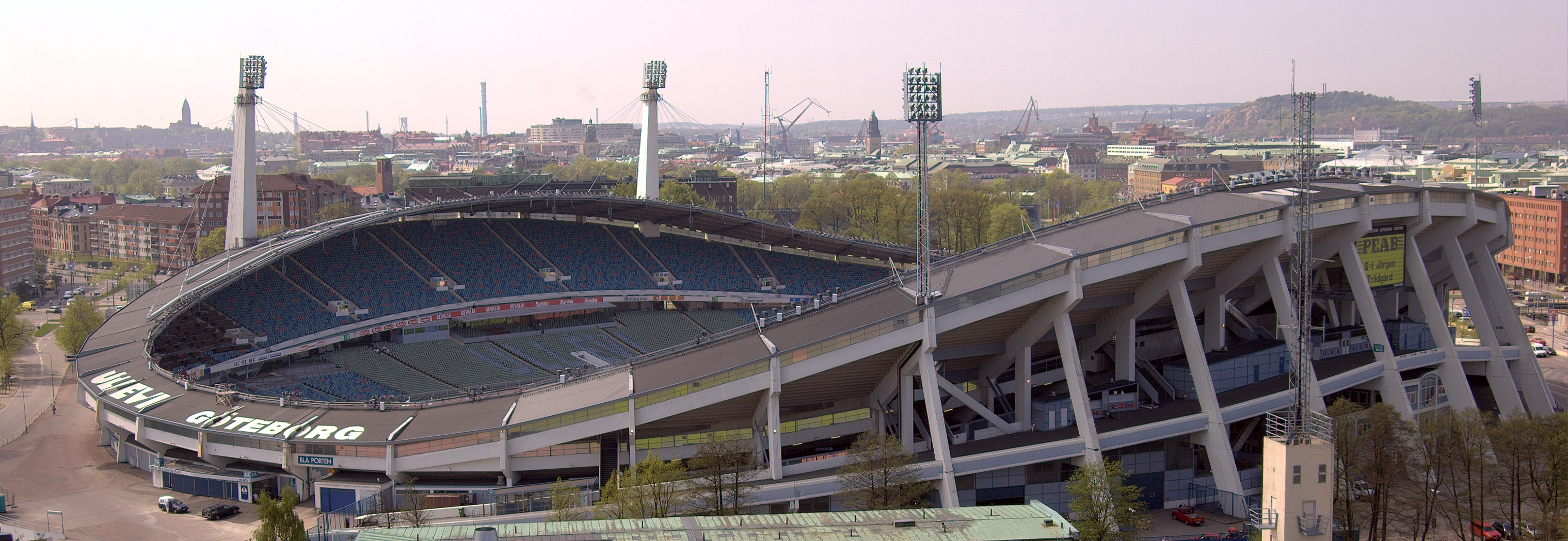
- The match was played at the Ullevi (pictured in 2006) in Gothenburg.
- Event: UEFA Euro 1992
Denmark	Germany
2	0
- Date: 26 June 1992
- Venue: Nya Ullevi, Gothenburg
- Referee: Bruno Galler (Switzerland)
- Attendance: 37,800

The UEFA Euro 1992 final was the final match of UEFA Euro 1992, the ninth European Championship, UEFA's top football competition for national teams. The match was played at the Nya Ullevi in Gothenburg, Sweden, on 26 June 1992, and was contested between Denmark and Germany. Denmark reached the final despite officially qualifying for the tournament ten days before it commenced, following Yugoslavia's ejection by UEFA as a result of the breakup of the country.

En route to the final, Denmark faced England, Sweden and France in the group stage, finishing second, before a penalty shoot-out victory over the Netherlands in the semi-finals saw them progress to their first European Championship final. Meanwhile, Germany finished second in Group 2, played alongside the CIS, Scotland and the Netherlands, before defeating 3–2 Sweden in the semi-finals.

The final took place in front of an audience of 37,800, and was refereed by Bruno Galler from Switzerland. Denmark won the match 2–0 thanks to goals from John Jensen and Kim Vilfort in an upset, securing their first European Championship title. Due to its circumstances, Denmark's tournament victory is often considered to be one of the biggest shocks in international football.

== Background ==
UEFA Euro 1992 was the ninth edition of the UEFA European Football Championship, UEFA's football competition for national teams. Qualifying rounds were played on a home-and-away round-robin tournament basis prior to the final tournament taking place in Sweden, between 10 and 26 June 1992. Ten days before UEFA Euro 1992 commenced, Yugoslavia were disqualified as a result of the breakup of the country and the ensuing warfare there. Denmark were brought into the tournament as replacements, with nine days to prepare. The eight qualified teams were divided into two groups of four with each team playing one another once. The winners of each group then faced the runners-up from the other group in semi-finals, the winners progressing to the final.

In the previous international tournament, the 1990 FIFA World Cup, Denmark failed to qualify for the finals, finishing in second place in group 1, one point behind Romania. Germany had won the tournament, beating Argentina 1–0 in the final. The UEFA Euro 1992 Final was the 22nd meeting between the sides, with Denmark winning 6, Germany being victorious 13 times, the remaining matches ending in draws; the teams had played one another in UEFA Euro 1988, in the group stage, where Germany won 2–0. The UEFA Euro 1992 Final marked Germany's fourth final in six European Championships while Denmark were making their first appearance in the tournament decider.

== Route to the final ==
=== Denmark ===
Denmark were assigned to UEFA Euro 1992 Group 1 where their opponents were France, Sweden and England. The first group match saw Denmark face England at the Stadion in Malmö on 11 June 1992 in front of 26,385 spectators. England's starting eleven had been weakened through injuries to Paul Parker, Lee Dixon, Gary Stevens and Rob Jones, prompting Denmark goalkeeper Peter Schmeichel to remark to his teammates, "Hey guys, we have a shot here". David Platt's first-half shot was saved by Schmeichel who also pushed Alan Smith's shot round the goalpost. Paul Merson's strike was then off-target after he had dribbled past three Denmark defenders. The second half saw Denmark in the ascendancy and Bent Christensen passed to John Jensen whose shot struck the inside of the goalpost and bounced back into the hands of the England goalkeeper Chris Woods. Kim Vilfort missed a late cross from Kim Christofte and the match ended goalless.

Denmark's second game, played three days later at the Råsunda Stadium in Solna, was against their rivals Sweden. Martin Dahlin struck a shot over the Denmark crossbar midway through the first half before Christofte's free kick was saved by Sweden goalkeeper Thomas Ravelli, and the game was 0–0 at the interval. In the 59th minute, Dahlin's cross was cleared by Lars Olsen but the ball fell to Tomas Brolin who struck it into the Denmark goal. He and Denmark's Torben Frank both missed late chances to score and the match ended 1–0 to Sweden.

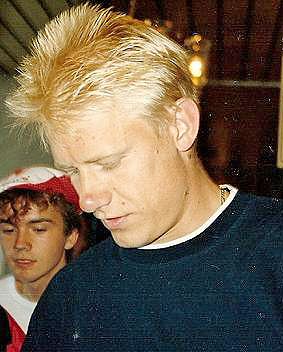
Peter Schmeichel (pictured in 1991) saved a penalty in the semi-final.

In the final group match, Denmark played France at the Stadion in Malmö on 17 June 1992. Vilfort, who had returned to Denmark to be with his terminally-ill daughter, was replaced by Henrik Larsen, who gave his side an early lead with a volley into the roof of France's net from a Flemming Povlsen header. After half-time, Schmeichel made saves from Didier Deschamps, Eric Cantona and a long-distance strike by substitute Luis Fernandez. Just after the hour-mark, France equalised when Jean-Pierre Papin's curling strike beat Schmeichel and flew into the top corner of Denmark's goal. Deschamps then shot wide before Povlsen's cross found Lars Elstrup who tapped the ball into the France goal to restore Denmark's lead; the match ended 2–1.

Ending the group stage as runners-up, Denmark faced group 2 winners, the Netherlands in the semi-final, played on 22 June 1992 at the Nya Ullevi in Gothenburg. Five minutes into the match, Denmark's Brian Laudrup dispossessed Frank de Boer and crossed the ball: Hans van Breukelen, the Netherlands goalkeeper missed his punch, allowing Larsen to score at the far post with a header. Midway through the half, Frank Rijkaard headed a cross from Rob Witschge to Dennis Bergkamp who beat Schmeichel with a shot that bounced just in front of him, to level the score. In the 32nd minute, Denmark retook the lead when Larsen scored his second, converting when Ronald Koeman cleared a Laudrup header. The second half saw further Denmark attempts to score before losing Henrik Andersen with a serious knee injury. The Netherlands increased the pressure and with five minutes of the match remaining scored the equaliser as Rijkaard headed in from a Witschge cross. The match ended 2–2 and went into extra time where despite chances for the Netherlands, the score remained unchanged and a penalty shoot-out was required. Koeman and Larsen scored either side's opening penalties before Marco van Basten's strike was saved by Schmeichel. All the remaining penalties were scored, with Denmark's Christofte despatching the winning strike, with his side progressing to the final 5–4 in the shoot-out. Olsen later suggested that in his opinion, the semi-final was "the best match a Danish team has ever played."

=== Germany ===
Germany were in UEFA Euro 1992 Group 2 where they faced the Commonwealth of Independent States (CIS), the Netherlands and Scotland. In their first group match, Germany played against the CIS at Idrottsparken in Norrköping on 12 June 1992. The game commenced with the CIS adopting a highly defensive formation restricting Germany to a shot from Guido Buchwald, a header from Rudi Völler and a strike from Thomas Häßler, all of which were off-target. The CIS were limited to one chance to score, when Igor Dobrovolski's high cross bounced off the top of Germany's crossbar. Midway through the second half, Stefan Reuter fouled Dobrovolski who scored the resulting penalty to give the CIS a 1–0 lead. Germany then saw off-target attempts from Häßler, Karl-Heinz Riedle and Buchwald but one minute into stoppage time, Thomas Doll won a free kick after being pushed over by Dmitri Kuznetsov. Häßler's strike passed over Jürgen Klinsmann, who ducked, and past the CIS goalkeeper Dmitri Kharine to secure a 1–1 draw.

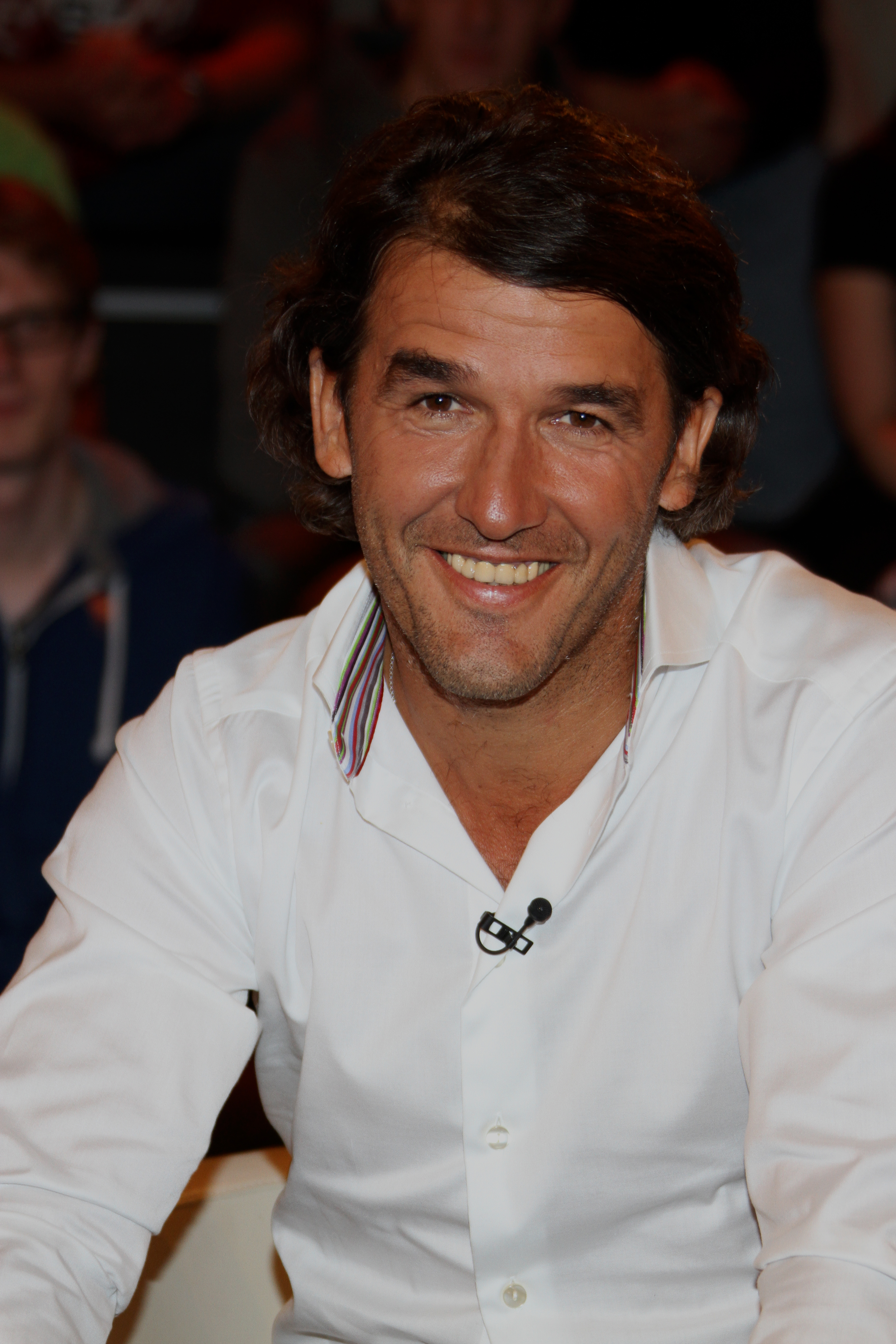
Karl-Heinz Riedle scored three goals during Germany's passage to the final, including two in the semi-final.

Germany's second game was against Scotland at the Idrottsparken in Norrköping on 15 June 1992. The early chances to score fell to Scotland: Richard Gough's whose header was tipped over the crossbar by Germany goalkeeper Bodo Illgner, who then saved the ball at the feet of Brian McClair before Gary McAllister's volley from the resulting corner was wide. Davie McPherson then struck McAllister's free kick off-target before Klinsmann's header hit Scotland goalkeeper Andy Goram's shins. In the 30th minute, Germany took the lead when Riedle struck the ball through Klinsmann's legs and past an unsighted Gorman. A minute into the second half Germany doubled their lead when a cross from Stefan Effenberg took a large deflection off Maurice Malpas and looped high in the air and into the Scotland goal. Both sides had several chances to score throughout the second half, with Andreas Möller and Häßler striking the ball against the Scotland goal frame and Illgner making saves against Ally McCoist and Paul McStay, and the match ended 2–0.

In their final group match, Germany played against the Netherlands at Nya Ullevi in Gothenburg on 18 June 1992. In the third minute, Jürgen Kohler fouled van Basten 30 yards (27 m) out from the Germany goal to concede a free kick which Ronald Koeman struck into the penalty area. Rijkaard out-jumped Effenberg and headed the ball into the Germany goal with Illgner stationary to give the Netherlands a 1–0. Häßler's shot was then saved by van Breukelen before the Netherlands doubled their advantage after Witschge's low shot from a Koeman free kick passed through a gap in the defensive wall and into the net. Further chances to score fell to the Netherlands including van Basten hitting the Germany crossbar, and Illgner making saves against both Ruud Gullit and Rijkaard. Eight minutes into the second half, Klinsmann rose above de Boer to head a corner from Häßler to make it 2–1 and Germany began to dominate the match. Aron Winter was then brought on by the Netherlands to replace de Boer. In the 71st minute, it was his cross that found Bergkamp whose diving header found the Germany net to restore the Netherlands' two-goal lead and the match ended 3–1.

Germany ended as runners-up in the group and thus faced Sweden in the semi-final at the Råsunda Stadion in Solna on 21 June 1992, their fourth appearance in the final four of the European Championship in six tournaments. Early in the match, Klinsmann played a one-two with Riedle and saw his shot saved by Sweden's goalkeeper Ravelli. In the 11th minute, Jan Eriksson fouled Riedle and Häßler struck the resulting free kick into the goal with Ravelli not moving. Brehme's shot then struck the crossbar before Ravelli saved another of his attempts. Just before the hour mark, Matthias Sammer's low cross was converted by Riedle to double Germany's lead. Five minutes later, Thomas Helmer conceded a penalty when he fouled Klas Ingesson, with Brolin scoring from the spot to make it 2–1. With two minutes of the match remaining, Germany made it 3–1 through Riedle before Kennet Andersson's header from an Ingesson cross meant the match ended 3–2 and Germany progressed to their third European Championship final in four tournaments.

=== Summary ===
Denmark
Round
Germany
Opponent
Result
Group stage
Opponent
Result
England
0–0
Match 1
CIS
1–1
Sweden
0–1
Match 2
Scotland
2–0
France
2–1
Match 3
Netherlands
1–3
Group 1 runners-up

Pos	Team	Pld	Pts
1	Sweden (H)	3	5
2	Denmark	3	3
3	France	3	2
4	England	3	2

Source: UEFA
(H) Hosts
Final standings
Group 2 runners-up

Pos	Team	Pld	Pts
1	Netherlands	3	5
2	Germany	3	3
3	Scotland	3	2
4	CIS	3	2

Source: UEFA
Opponent
Result
Knockout stage
Opponent
Result
Netherlands
2–2 (a.e.t.) (5–4 p)
Semi-finals
Sweden
3–2

== Match ==
=== Pre-match ===
Germany had one extra day to prepare for the final and selected the same starting eleven as they used in the semi-final. Kent Nielsen was restored to Denmark's team in place of Andersen who was both injured and suspended. The final was refereed by the Swiss official Bruno Galler.

=== Summary ===
The final took place at the Nya Ullevi in Gothenburg on 26 June 1992 in front of 37,800 people. Germany made the stronger start with chances to score falling to Reuter and Buchwald, both of which were saved by Schmeichel. In the 18th minute, Vilfort took possession of the ball with a strong tackle on Brehme before passing it to Povlsen. He played it diagonally backwards in-field to the edge of the Germany penalty area where Jensen struck it first time, past Illgner high into the net to give Denmark a 1–0 lead with his second international goal in 48 games. Four minutes later, Schmeichel dived full-length to save a strike from Klinsmann. Effenberg then received the ball from a hooked Klinsmann pass midway into the Denmark half who ran with it before shooting from the edge of the penalty area but Schmeichel pushed the ball out.

Soon after half-time, Germany made their first substitution of the match with Doll coming on to replace Sammer. Midway through the second half, Denmark's John Sivebæk was brought off in favour of Claus Christiansen. In the 71st minute, Vilfort received the ball from Christofte before running into the Germany penalty area but struck his shot wide of the far post. Nielsen cleared a Klinsmann cross to prevent Riedle from scoring, before Klinsmann himself out-jumped two Denmark defenders to head a cross goal-bound but Schmeichel tipped it over the crossbar. With twelve minutes of the match remaining, a clearance from Helmer was headed by Sivebæk to Vilfort who dragged the ball back and away from two converging Germany defenders and struck a left-footed shot off the bottom of the post and into the Germany goal past a diving Illgner to make it 2–0. That remained the final score and Denmark secured their first European Championship.

=== Details ===
26 June 1992
20:15 CEST

Denmark	2–0	Germany
Jensen 18'; Vilfort 78'	Report

Ullevi, Gothenburg
Attendance: 37,800
Referee: Bruno Galler (Switzerland)

Denmark	Germany

GK	1	Peter Schmeichel
CB	4	Lars Olsen (c)
CB	12	Torben Piechnik	(yellow card) 32'
CB	3	Kent Nielsen
RWB	2	John Sivebæk		(substituted off) 66'
LWB	6	Kim Christofte
CM	7	John Jensen
CM	18	Kim Vilfort
AM	13	Henrik Larsen
SS	11	Brian Laudrup
CF	9	Flemming Povlsen
Substitutions:
DF	17	Claus Christiansen		(substituted on) 66'
Manager:
Richard Møller Nielsen

GK	1	Bodo Illgner
SW	6	Guido Buchwald
CB	4	Jürgen Kohler
CB	14	Thomas Helmer
RWB	2	Stefan Reuter	(yellow card) 55'
LWB	3	Andreas Brehme (c)
CM	16	Matthias Sammer		(substituted off) 46'
CM	17	Stefan Effenberg	(yellow card) 35'	(substituted off) 80'
AM	8	Thomas Häßler	(yellow card) 39'
CF	11	Karl-Heinz Riedle
CF	18	Jürgen Klinsmann	(yellow card) 88'
Substitutions:
MF	10	Thomas Doll	(yellow card) 83'	(substituted on) 46'
FW	13	Andreas Thom		(substituted on) 80'
Manager:
Berti Vogts

Linesmen:
Zivanko Popović (Switzerland)
Paul Wyttenbach (Switzerland)
Fourth official:
Kurt Röthlisberger (Switzerland)

Match rules

- 90 minutes
- 30 minutes of extra time if necessary
- Penalty shoot-out if scores still level
- Maximum of two substitutions

== Post-match ==
Denmark's Schmeichel and Laudrup, along with Germany's Brehme, Kohler, Effenberg and Häßler, were all named in UEFA's team of the tournament. Germany's manager Berti Vogts suggested that conceding the first goal had a detrimental effect on his side, "after going a goal behind, we fell into the headless chicken syndrome." Schmeichel said "it really sank in when we were in Copenhagen in the town hall for the celebrations with the rest of Denmark. That was unbelievable, truly unbelievable." Vilfort later said "We had fantastic spirit. The team wanted to win and that's a very good thing when you're at the highest level ... We didn't have the best players, but we had the best team." Jan Mølby, who was not part of the Denmark squad during the tournament, later said "In 1992, it was a big surprise for everybody ... It shows what team spirit and confidence is able to do." Reflecting at the time on Denmark's recent referendum where they decided against joining the European Union, the Danish foreign secretary Uffe Ellemann-Jensen joked "If you can't join them, beat them".

Denmark's victory has been described as one of the biggest shocks in international football history, and is listed by UEFA as one of the most surprising results in the European Championship. The BBC and The Guardian both called it a "fairy tale".

In the next international tournament, the 1994 FIFA World Cup, Denmark failed to progress from their qualifying group, finishing third behind Spain and the Republic of Ireland. Germany were knocked out at the quarter-final stage by Bulgaria.

A Danish film Summer of '92 was made based on this.

== See also ==
- Denmark at the UEFA European Championship
- Germany at the UEFA European Championship
