= UEFA Euro 1988 squads =

European football teams

UEFA Euro 1988 was a football tournament that took place in West Germany between 10 June and 25 June 1988. The eight competing nations were required to name a squad of no more than 20 players. The players' listed ages are their ages on the tournament's opening day (10 June 1988).

== Group 1 ==
=== Denmark ===
Manager: (West Germany) Sepp Piontek

No.	Pos.	Player	Date of birth (age)	Caps	Club
1	GK	Troels Rasmussen	7 April 1961 (aged 27)	27	(Denmark) AGF
2	DF	John Sivebæk	25 October 1961 (aged 26)	49	(France) Saint-Étienne
3	DF	Søren Busk	10 April 1953 (aged 35)	59	(Austria) Wiener SC
4	DF	Morten Olsen (captain)	14 August 1949 (aged 38)	95	(West Germany) 1. FC Köln
5	DF	Ivan Nielsen	9 October 1956 (aged 31)	42	(Netherlands) PSV Eindhoven
6	MF	Søren Lerby	1 February 1958 (aged 30)	64	(Netherlands) PSV Eindhoven
7	MF	John Helt	29 December 1959 (aged 28)	15	(Denmark) Lyngby
8	MF	Per Frimann	4 June 1962 (aged 26)	14	(Denmark) AGF
9	DF	Jan Heintze	17 August 1963 (aged 24)	5	(Netherlands) PSV Eindhoven
10	FW	Preben Elkjær	11 September 1957 (aged 30)	67	(Italy) Hellas Verona
11	MF	Michael Laudrup	15 June 1964 (aged 23)	43	(Italy) Juventus
12	DF	Lars Olsen	2 February 1961 (aged 27)	11	(Denmark) Brøndby
13	MF	John Jensen	3 May 1965 (aged 23)	12	(Denmark) Brøndby
14	MF	Jesper Olsen	20 March 1961 (aged 27)	40	(England) Manchester United
15	FW	Flemming Povlsen	3 December 1966 (aged 21)	11	(West Germany) 1. FC Köln
16	GK	Peter Schmeichel	18 November 1963 (aged 24)	6	(Denmark) Brøndby
17	MF	Klaus Berggreen	3 February 1958 (aged 30)	43	(Italy) Torino
18	FW	John Eriksen	20 November 1957 (aged 30)	14	(Switzerland) Servette
19	DF	Bjørn Kristensen	10 October 1963 (aged 24)	7	(Denmark) AGF
20	MF	Kim Vilfort	15 November 1962 (aged 25)	9	(Denmark) Brøndby

=== Italy ===
Manager: Azeglio Vicini

No.	Pos.	Player	Date of birth (age)	Caps	Club
1	GK	Walter Zenga	28 April 1960 (aged 28)	17	(Italy) Internazionale
2	DF	Franco Baresi	8 May 1960 (aged 28)	21	(Italy) Milan
3	DF	Giuseppe Bergomi (captain)	22 December 1963 (aged 24)	46	(Italy) Internazionale
4	DF	Roberto Cravero	3 January 1964 (aged 24)	0	(Italy) Torino
5	DF	Ciro Ferrara	11 February 1967 (aged 21)	4	(Italy) Napoli
6	DF	Riccardo Ferri	20 August 1963 (aged 24)	12	(Italy) Internazionale
7	DF	Giovanni Francini	3 August 1963 (aged 24)	7	(Italy) Napoli
8	DF	Paolo Maldini	26 June 1968 (aged 19)	3	(Italy) Milan
9	MF	Carlo Ancelotti	10 June 1959 (aged 29)	17	(Italy) Milan
10	MF	Luigi De Agostini	7 April 1963 (aged 25)	10	(Italy) Juventus
11	MF	Fernando De Napoli	15 March 1964 (aged 24)	21	(Italy) Napoli
12	GK	Stefano Tacconi	13 May 1957 (aged 31)	1	(Italy) Juventus
13	MF	Luca Fusi	7 June 1963 (aged 25)	1	(Italy) Sampdoria
14	MF	Giuseppe Giannini	20 August 1964 (aged 23)	15	(Italy) Roma
15	MF	Francesco Romano	25 April 1960 (aged 28)	0	(Italy) Napoli
16	FW	Alessandro Altobelli	28 November 1955 (aged 32)	57	(Italy) Internazionale
17	MF	Roberto Donadoni	9 September 1963 (aged 24)	16	(Italy) Milan
18	FW	Roberto Mancini	27 November 1964 (aged 23)	13	(Italy) Sampdoria
19	FW	Ruggiero Rizzitelli	2 September 1967 (aged 20)	2	(Italy) Cesena
20	FW	Gianluca Vialli	9 July 1964 (aged 23)	25	(Italy) Sampdoria

=== Spain ===
Manager: Miguel Muñoz

No.	Pos.	Player	Date of birth (age)	Caps	Club
1	GK	Andoni Zubizarreta	23 October 1961 (aged 26)	115	(Spain) Barcelona
2	DF	Tomás Reñones	9 August 1960 (aged 27)	31	(Spain) Atlético Madrid
3	DF	José Antonio Camacho (captain)	8 June 1955 (aged 33)	73	(Spain) Real Madrid
4	DF	Genar Andrinúa	9 May 1964 (aged 24)	66	(Spain) Athletic Bilbáo
5	MF	Víctor Muñoz	15 March 1957 (aged 31)	44	(Spain) Barcelona
6	MF	Ramón Calderé	16 January 1959 (aged 29)	21	(Spain) Barcelona
7	FW	Julio Salinas	11 September 1962 (aged 25)	30	(Spain) Atlético Madrid
8	DF	Manuel Sanchís	23 March 1965 (aged 23)	13	(Spain) Real Madrid
9	FW	Emilio Butragueño	22 July 1963 (aged 24)	19	(Spain) Real Madrid
10	FW	Eloy	10 July 1964 (aged 23)	32	(Spain) Sporting Gijón
11	DF	Rafael Gordillo	24 February 1957 (aged 31)	61	(Spain) Real Madrid
12	DF	Diego Rodríguez Fernández	20 April 1960 (aged 28)	1	(Spain) Real Betis
13	GK	Francisco Buyo	13 January 1958 (aged 30)	2	(Spain) Real Madrid
14	MF	Ricardo Gallego	8 February 1959 (aged 29)	44	(Spain) Real Madrid
15	MF	Eusebio	13 April 1964 (aged 24)	17	(Spain) Atlético Madrid
16	MF	José Mari Bakero	11 February 1963 (aged 25)	3	(Spain) Real Sociedad
17	MF	Txiki Begiristain	12 August 1964 (aged 23)	12	(Spain) Real Sociedad
18	DF	Miquel Soler	13 March 1965 (aged 23)	23	(Spain) Espanyol
19	MF	Rafael Martín Vázquez	25 September 1965 (aged 22)	3	(Spain) Real Madrid
20	MF	Míchel	23 March 1963 (aged 25)	1	(Spain) Real Madrid

=== West Germany ===
Manager: Franz Beckenbauer

No.	Pos.	Player	Date of birth (age)	Caps	Club
1	GK	Eike Immel	27 November 1960 (aged 27)	15	(West Germany) VfB Stuttgart
2	DF	Guido Buchwald	24 January 1961 (aged 27)	18	(West Germany) VfB Stuttgart
3	DF	Andreas Brehme	9 November 1960 (aged 27)	36	(West Germany) Bayern Munich
4	DF	Jürgen Kohler	6 October 1965 (aged 22)	15	(West Germany) 1. FC Köln
5	DF	Matthias Herget	14 November 1955 (aged 32)	34	(West Germany) KFC Uerdingen
6	DF	Uli Borowka	19 May 1962 (aged 26)	2	(West Germany) Werder Bremen
7	MF	Pierre Littbarski	16 April 1960 (aged 28)	53	(West Germany) 1. FC Köln
8	MF	Lothar Matthäus (captain)	21 March 1961 (aged 27)	61	(West Germany) Bayern Munich
9	FW	Rudi Völler	13 April 1960 (aged 28)	49	(Italy) Roma
10	MF	Olaf Thon	1 May 1966 (aged 22)	24	(West Germany) Schalke 04
11	FW	Frank Mill	23 July 1958 (aged 29)	10	(West Germany) Borussia Dortmund
12	GK	Bodo Illgner	7 April 1967 (aged 21)	3	(West Germany) 1. FC Köln
13	MF	Wolfram Wuttke	17 November 1961 (aged 26)	3	(West Germany) 1. FC Kaiserslautern
14	DF	Thomas Berthold	12 November 1964 (aged 23)	26	(Italy) Hellas Verona
15	DF	Hans Pflügler	27 March 1960 (aged 28)	6	(West Germany) Bayern Munich
16	FW	Dieter Eckstein	12 March 1964 (aged 24)	5	(West Germany) 1. FC Nürnberg
17	MF	Hans Dorfner	3 July 1965 (aged 22)	5	(West Germany) Bayern Munich
18	FW	Jürgen Klinsmann	30 July 1964 (aged 23)	5	(West Germany) VfB Stuttgart
19	DF	Gunnar Sauer	11 June 1964 (aged 23)	0	(West Germany) Werder Bremen
20	MF	Wolfgang Rolff	26 December 1959 (aged 28)	31	(West Germany) Bayer Leverkusen

== Group 2 ==
=== England ===
Manager: Bobby Robson

No.	Pos.	Player	Date of birth (age)	Caps	Club
1	GK	Peter Shilton	18 September 1949 (aged 38)	98	(England) Derby County
2	DF	Gary Stevens	27 March 1963 (aged 25)	23	(England) Everton
3	DF	Kenny Sansom	26 September 1958 (aged 29)	83	(England) Arsenal
4	MF	Neil Webb	30 July 1963 (aged 24)	7	(England) Nottingham Forest
5	DF	Dave Watson	20 November 1961 (aged 26)	11	(England) Everton
6	DF	Tony Adams	10 October 1966 (aged 21)	11	(England) Arsenal
7	MF	Bryan Robson (captain)	11 January 1957 (aged 31)	66	(England) Manchester United
8	MF	Trevor Steven	21 September 1963 (aged 24)	23	(England) Everton
9	FW	Peter Beardsley	18 January 1961 (aged 27)	24	(England) Liverpool
10	FW	Gary Lineker	30 November 1960 (aged 27)	32	(Spain) Barcelona
11	MF	John Barnes	7 November 1963 (aged 24)	39	(England) Liverpool
12	MF	Chris Waddle	14 December 1960 (aged 27)	34	(England) Tottenham Hotspur
13	GK	Chris Woods	14 November 1959 (aged 28)	12	(Scotland) Rangers
14	DF	Viv Anderson	29 July 1956 (aged 31)	30	(England) Manchester United
15	MF	Steve McMahon	20 August 1961 (aged 26)	3	(England) Liverpool
16	MF	Peter Reid	20 June 1956 (aged 31)	13	(England) Everton
17	MF	Glenn Hoddle	27 October 1957 (aged 30)	50	(France) Monaco
18	FW	Mark Hateley	7 November 1961 (aged 26)	28	(France) Monaco
19	DF	Mark Wright	1 August 1963 (aged 24)	20	(England) Derby County
20	DF	Tony Dorigo	31 December 1965 (aged 22)	0	(England) Chelsea

=== Netherlands ===
Manager: Rinus Michels

No.	Pos.	Player	Date of birth (age)	Caps	Club
1	GK	Hans van Breukelen	4 October 1956 (aged 31)	35	(Netherlands) PSV Eindhoven
2	DF	Adri van Tiggelen	16 June 1957 (aged 30)	24	(Belgium) Anderlecht
3	DF	Sjaak Troost	28 August 1959 (aged 28)	3	(Netherlands) Feyenoord
4	DF	Ronald Koeman	21 March 1963 (aged 25)	23	(Netherlands) PSV Eindhoven
5	MF	Aron Winter	1 March 1967 (aged 21)	6	(Netherlands) Ajax
6	DF	Berry van Aerle	8 December 1962 (aged 25)	6	(Netherlands) PSV Eindhoven
7	MF	Gerald Vanenburg	5 March 1964 (aged 24)	22	(Netherlands) PSV Eindhoven
8	MF	Arnold Mühren	2 May 1951 (aged 37)	18	(Netherlands) Ajax
9	FW	John Bosman	1 February 1965 (aged 23)	12	(Netherlands) Ajax
10	FW	Ruud Gullit (captain)	1 September 1962 (aged 25)	34	(Italy) Milan
11	MF	John van 't Schip	30 December 1963 (aged 24)	16	(Netherlands) Ajax
12	FW	Marco van Basten	31 October 1964 (aged 23)	19	(Italy) Milan
13	MF	Erwin Koeman	20 September 1961 (aged 26)	10	(Belgium) KV Mechelen
14	FW	Wim Kieft	12 November 1962 (aged 25)	15	(Netherlands) PSV Eindhoven
15	DF	Wim Koevermans	28 June 1960 (aged 27)	1	(Netherlands) Fortuna Sittard
16	GK	Joop Hiele	25 December 1958 (aged 29)	4	(Netherlands) Feyenoord
17	DF	Frank Rijkaard	30 September 1962 (aged 25)	26	(Spain) Zaragoza
18	DF	Wilbert Suvrijn	26 October 1962 (aged 25)	6	(Netherlands) Roda JC
19	MF	Hendrie Krüzen	24 November 1964 (aged 23)	3	(Netherlands) Den Bosch
20	MF	Jan Wouters	17 July 1960 (aged 27)	14	(Netherlands) Ajax

=== Republic of Ireland ===
Manager: (England) Jack Charlton

No.	Pos.	Player	Date of birth (age)	Caps	Club
1	GK	Packie Bonner	24 May 1960 (aged 28)	23	(Scotland) Celtic
2	DF	Chris Morris	24 December 1963 (aged 24)	5	(Scotland) Celtic
3	DF	Chris Hughton	11 December 1958 (aged 29)	36	(England) Tottenham Hotspur
4	DF	Mick McCarthy	7 February 1959 (aged 29)	27	(Scotland) Celtic
5	DF	Kevin Moran	29 April 1956 (aged 32)	36	(England) Manchester United
6	MF	Ronnie Whelan	25 September 1961 (aged 26)	26	(England) Liverpool
7	MF	Paul McGrath	4 December 1959 (aged 28)	23	(England) Manchester United
8	MF	Ray Houghton	9 January 1962 (aged 26)	15	(England) Liverpool
9	FW	John Aldridge	18 September 1958 (aged 29)	15	(England) Liverpool
10	FW	Frank Stapleton (captain)	10 July 1956 (aged 31)	63	(England) Derby County
11	MF	Tony Galvin	12 July 1956 (aged 31)	24	(England) Sheffield Wednesday
12	FW	Tony Cascarino	1 September 1962 (aged 25)	5	(England) Millwall
13	MF	Liam O'Brien	5 September 1964 (aged 23)	6	(England) Manchester United
14	FW	David Kelly	25 November 1965 (aged 22)	3	(England) Walsall
15	MF	Kevin Sheedy	21 October 1959 (aged 28)	13	(England) Everton
16	GK	Gerry Peyton	20 May 1956 (aged 32)	24	(England) Bournemouth
17	FW	John Byrne	1 February 1961 (aged 27)	14	(France) Le Havre
18	MF	John Sheridan	1 October 1964 (aged 23)	4	(England) Leeds United
19	DF	John Anderson	7 October 1959 (aged 28)	15	(England) Newcastle United
20	FW	Niall Quinn	6 October 1966 (aged 21)	9	(England) Arsenal

=== Soviet Union ===
Manager: Valeriy Lobanovskyi

No.	Pos.	Player	Date of birth (age)	Caps	Club
1	GK	Rinat Dasayev (captain)	13 June 1957 (aged 30)	77	(Soviet Union) Spartak Moscow
2	DF	Volodymyr Bessonov	5 March 1958 (aged 30)	67	(Soviet Union) Dynamo Kyiv
3	DF	Vagiz Khidiyatullin	3 March 1959 (aged 29)	42	(Soviet Union) Spartak Moscow
4	DF	Oleh Kuznetsov	22 March 1963 (aged 25)	26	(Soviet Union) Dynamo Kyiv
5	DF	Anatoliy Demyanenko	19 February 1959 (aged 29)	65	(Soviet Union) Dynamo Kyiv
6	MF	Vasyl Rats	25 April 1961 (aged 27)	23	(Soviet Union) Dynamo Kyiv
7	MF	Sergei Aleinikov	7 November 1961 (aged 26)	41	(Soviet Union) Dinamo Minsk
8	MF	Hennadiy Lytovchenko	11 September 1963 (aged 24)	32	(Soviet Union) Dynamo Kyiv
9	MF	Oleksandr Zavarov	26 April 1961 (aged 27)	23	(Soviet Union) Dynamo Kyiv
10	FW	Oleh Protasov	4 February 1964 (aged 24)	35	(Soviet Union) Dynamo Kyiv
11	FW	Ihor Belanov	25 September 1960 (aged 27)	22	(Soviet Union) Dynamo Kyiv
12	DF	Ivan Vyshnevskyi	21 February 1957 (aged 31)	6	(Soviet Union) Dnipro Dnipropetrovsk
13	DF	Tengiz Sulakvelidze	23 July 1956 (aged 31)	47	(Soviet Union) Dinamo Tbilisi
14	DF	Vyacheslav Sukristov	1 January 1961 (aged 27)	3	(Soviet Union) Žalgiris
15	MF	Oleksiy Mykhaylychenko	30 March 1963 (aged 25)	7	(Soviet Union) Dynamo Kyiv
16	GK	Viktor Chanov	21 July 1959 (aged 28)	7	(Soviet Union) Dynamo Kyiv
17	FW	Sergey Dmitriyev	19 March 1964 (aged 24)	6	(Soviet Union) Zenit Leningrad
18	MF	Sergey Gotsmanov	27 March 1959 (aged 29)	25	(Soviet Union) Dinamo Minsk
19	DF	Sergei Baltacha	17 February 1958 (aged 30)	44	(Soviet Union) Dynamo Kyiv
20	MF	Viktor Pasulko	1 January 1961 (aged 27)	6	(Soviet Union) Spartak Moscow
