= Erik Nielsen (footballer, born 1937) =

Danish footballer

Erik Nielsen (born 12 December 1937) is a Danish former international football player, and father of the former international football player, now manager, Kent Nielsen.

Erik Nielsen had his whole career in the football club Brønshøj Boldklub, for which he had 328 appearances (from 1956 to 1969). This was a club record set at a time when the Danish league was under a strict code of amateurism.

He was capped once, in a match against East Germany in Leipzig in 1962. Additionally he had 3 appearances on the so-called "National team - B", and in his younger years 5 appearances on various youth national teams.

Erik Nielsen is also the father of Tommy Nielsen who had 283 appearances for Brønshøj Boldklub.
