= Claus Christiansen (footballer, born 1967) =

Danish footballer

Claus Odgaard Christiansen (born 19 October 1967 in Glostrup) is a Danish former professional footballer who played as a defender. He has the nickname 'Kuno'.

At club level, he appeared in 295 Danish league matches for Lyngby Boldklub, where he also was the club captain. With the club he won the Danish Championship in 1992 and the Danish Cup in 1990. At international level, he played five matches for the Denmark national team, most notably the semi-final and final matches of the Euro 1992 tournament, which Denmark won. He made the assist for Kim Vilforts 2-0 goal in the final against Germany.

He retired at the age of 28, despite having 1.5 years left of his contract.
