= Kent Nielsen =

Danish footballer and manager (born 1961)

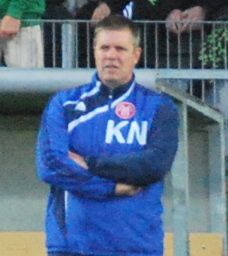
- Nielsen managing AaB in 2011

Personal information
- Date of birth: 28 December 1961 (age 64)
- Place of birth: Frederiksberg, Denmark
- Height: 1.92 m (6 ft 4 in)
- Position: Centre back

Team information
- Current team: Denmark (assistant)

Senior career*
Years	Team	Apps	(Gls)
1980–1986	Brønshøj	230	(34)
1987–1989	Brøndby	91	(7)
1989–1991	Aston Villa	79	(4)
1992–1994	AGF	62	(7)
Total		462	(52)

International career
1979–1980	Denmark U19	9	(0)
1983–1985	Denmark U21	11	(1)
1983–1992	Denmark	54	(3)

Managerial career
- 2001–2008: Horsens
- 2009–2010: Brøndby
- 2010–2015: AaB
- 2015–2018: OB
- 2019–2026: Silkeborg
Medal record
Men's football
Representing Denmark
UEFA European Championship
Winner	1992 Sweden
- * Club domestic league appearances and goals

Kent Nielsen (born 28 December 1961) is a Danish professional football manager and former player, who is currently an assistant coach at the Denmark national team. He was named coach of the year by the Danish Football Association in 2014 after winning both the Danish Superliga and the Danish Cup with AaB. He started his coaching career as caretaker manager of AGF, before getting his breakthrough with AC Horsens, guiding the club to promotion to the top-flight Superliga championship in 2005. He has also coached Superliga clubs Brøndby and OB. He has the record for most games managed in the Danish Superliga.

In his active career, Nielsen played as a centre back. He won two Danish championships and a Danish Cup trophy with Brøndby IF. He played three years in England with Aston Villa, before ending his career after winning the Danish Cup with AGF. He played 54 games and scored three goals for the Denmark national team, winning the Euro 1992 championship.

== Playing career ==
=== Club career ===
The son of former Danish international Erik Nielsen, Kent Nielsen started his career in Erik's former club Brønshøj BK, alongside his brother Tommy. Kent Nielsen switched to the Danish team Brøndby in 1987, with whom he won the 1987 and 1988 Danish championships, as well as the 1989 Danish Cup. Following 91 first team games for Brøndby, Nielsen left the club in 1989. He was bought by English club Aston Villa for a reported £500,000 transfer fee, and secured himself a place in the starting line-up in his two first seasons with the club. New Aston Villa manager Ron Atkinson did not see Nielsen as fitting into his 4–4–2 tactics and brought in replacement Shaun Teale, and Nielsen looked to leave the club. In early 1992, he moved back to Denmark, to play for AGF. He won the 1992 Danish Cup with AGF, before he retired in 1994.

=== International career ===
Nielsen started his international career with the Denmark national under-19 football team in July 1979. He was called up for the Denmark national under-21 football team in May 1983. Following two under-21 games, he made his debut for the senior Danish national team on 5 October 1983 in a 1984 Summer Olympics qualification game against Poland, making him the last Brønshøj player until this date, to represent the club on the national squad. He then reverted to the under-21 team. He played his second senior international game in January 1985, and was selected by national team manager Sepp Piontek for the Danish squad at the 1986 World Cup, but spent the entire tournament as an unused substitute. He was a part of Olympic manager Richard Møller Nielsen's team for the 1988 Summer Olympics qualification tournament, but was not called up to Piontek's squad for the Euro 1988.

Under new national team manager Richard Møller Nielsen, Kent Nielsen became a constant member of the Denmark squad. After his return to AGF, he was selected to represent Denmark at the Euro 1992. Nielsen played four of Denmark's five games, including the Euro 1992 final against Germany, where he most famously cleared the ball off the goalline with a bicycle kick, avoiding a goal from Karl-Heinz Riedle. He ended his international career following the 2–0 win against Germany.

== Managerial career ==
Following his retirement, Nielsen spent years as an amateur football manager until he and former Danish international Lars Lundkvist took over as co-managers of AGF in April 2000. He and Lundkvist kept AGF from being relegated, but left the club after the season end. In 2001, he was appointed manager of Danish 1st Division club AC Horsens, which he managed to promotion for the Danish Superliga. Against all odds, he led the team to survive the 2005–06 Superliga season. His success continued during the following season, and he was named 2006 Danish Coach of the Year. In the 2007–08 season, his team finished in a historic fifth place, despite having one of the lowest budgets in the league.

Eventually, Nielsen's achievements with Horsens caught the attention of other clubs. In January 2009, he signed a four-year contract with his former club Brøndby IF. He managed Brøndby to 17 victories in 38 games. In March 2010, he was sacked, following a 1–3 defeat to HB Køge.

On 11 October 2010, Nielsen replaced Magnus Pehrsson as manager of AaB. He led the club to a domestic double, winning both the 2013–14 Danish Superliga championship and the 2013–14 Danish Cup. In 2015, he became the head coach of OB. After three seasons, he was sacked due to poor team performance and results.

=== Silkeborg ===
Nielsen was later appointed as head coach Silkeborg in the Danish 1st Division in August 2018 to replace Peter Sørensen, following a bad start to the season. He would begin in the job from the season after due to an operation after an injury. Michael Hansen was the interim coach in the mean time, and during this season the team was promoted, so Nielsen took over the Superliga team in 2019.

In Nielsen's first season at the club, the team was relegated due to the Superliga changing structure and going from 14 to 12 teams. The club and Nielsen agreed to, and the season afterwards they were promoted.The following season, Silkeborg finished in third place as a newly promoted team. Two years later, Silkeborg won the Danish Cup in 2024, beating AGF 1–0 in the final.

In December 2025, Nielsen managed his 600th match in the Danish Superliga, a record for the league.

On 11 June 2026, Silkeborg announced Nielsen's departure, after he accepted to become an assistant to Brian Riemer in the Denmark national team.

== Managerial statistics ==
As of 17 May 2026

Managerial record by team and tenure
Team	From	To	Record				
Team	From	To	G	W	D	L	Win %
Horsens	1 July 2001	31 December 2008	261	104	67	90	39.85
Brøndby	1 January 2009	25 March 2010	48	20	11	17	41.67
AaB	11 October 2010	30 June 2015	184	77	46	61	41.85
OB	1 July 2015	21 May 2018	110	40	23	47	36.36
Silkeborg	1 July 2019	11 June 2026	273	112	60	101	41.03
Total			876	353	207	316	40.30

== Honours ==
=== Player ===
Brøndby

- Danish championship: 1987, 1988
- Danish Cup: 1989

AGF

- Danish Cup: 1992

Denmark

- UEFA European Championship: 1992

=== Manager ===
AaB

- Danish Superliga: 2013–14
- Danish Cup: 2013–14

Silkeborg

- Danish Cup: 2023–24
