= UEFA Euro 1992 Group 2 =

Football tournament group stage

Group 2 of UEFA Euro 1992 was one of the two groups in the final tournament's initial group stage. It began on 12 June and was completed on 18 June. The group consisted of the Netherlands, Scotland, Germany and the CIS, a team composed of players from 12 of the 15 former Soviet Union members.

The Netherlands won the group and advanced to the semi-finals, along with Germany. Scotland and the CIS failed to advance.

== Teams ==
Team	Method of qualification	Date of qualification	Finals appearance	Last appearance	Previous best performance
CIS (Note: From 1960 to 1988, CIS competed as the Soviet Union.)	Group 3 winner (Note: Replaced the Soviet Union.)	13 November 1991	6th	1988	Winners (1960)
Germany (Note: From 1972 to 1988, Germany competed as West Germany.)	Group 5 winner	20 November 1991	6th	1988	Winners (1972, 1980)
Netherlands	Group 6 winner	4 December 1991	4th	1988	Winners (1988)
Scotland	Group 2 winner	13 November 1991	1st	—	Debut

== Standings ==
Pos	Team	Pld	W	D	L	GF	GA	GD	Pts	Qualification
1	Netherlands	3	2	1	0	4	1	+3	5	Advance to knockout stage
2	Germany	3	1	1	1	4	4	0	3	Advance to knockout stage
3	Scotland	3	1	0	2	3	3	0	2	
4	CIS	3	0	2	1	1	4	−3	2	

Source: UEFA
Rules for classification: Group stage tiebreakers

In the semi-finals,

- The winner of Group 2, Netherlands, advanced to play the runner-up of Group 1, Denmark.
- The runner-up of Group 2, Germany, advanced to play the winner of Group 1, Sweden.

== Matches ==
=== Netherlands vs Scotland ===
12 June 1992
17:15

Netherlands	1–0	Scotland
Bergkamp 75'	Report

Ullevi, Gothenburg
Attendance: 35,720
Referee: Bo Karlsson (Sweden)

Netherlands	Scotland

GK	1	Hans van Breukelen
CB	2	Berry van Aerle
CB	4	Ronald Koeman
CB	3	Adri van Tiggelen
RM	20	Bryan Roy
CM	8	Frank Rijkaard
CM	6	Jan Wouters		(substituted off) 54'
LM	14	Rob Witschge	(yellow card) 25'
AM	10	Ruud Gullit (c)
CF	7	Dennis Bergkamp		(substituted off) 84'
CF	9	Marco van Basten
Substitutions:
MF	18	Wim Jonk		(substituted on) 54'
MF	15	Aron Winter		(substituted on) 84'
Manager:
Rinus Michels

GK	1	Andy Goram
RB	9	Stewart McKimmie
CB	2	Richard Gough (c)
CB	8	Dave McPherson
LB	4	Maurice Malpas
RM	11	Gary McAllister
CM	3	Paul McStay
CM	10	Stuart McCall
LM	6	Brian McClair	(substituted off) 78'
CF	7	Gordon Durie
CF	5	Ally McCoist	(substituted off) 73'
Substitutions:
FW	14	Kevin Gallacher	(substituted on) 73'
FW	20	Duncan Ferguson	(substituted on) 78'
Manager:
Andy Roxburgh

Linesmen:
Lennart Sundqvist (Sweden)
Bo Persson (Sweden)
Fourth official:
Leif Sundell (Sweden)

=== CIS vs Germany ===
12 June 1992
20:15

CIS	1–1	Germany
Dobrovolski 64' (pen.)	Report	Häßler 90'

Idrottsparken, Norrköping
Attendance: 17,410
Referee: Gérard Biguet (France)

CIS	Germany

GK	1	Dmitri Kharine	(yellow card) 75'
RB	8	Andrei Kanchelskis
CB	2	Andrey Chernyshov
CB	5	Oleh Kuznetsov
LB	16	Dmitri Kuznetsov
DM	4	Akhrik Tsveiba	(yellow card) 88'
RM	6	Igor Shalimov		(substituted off) 86'
CM	7	Oleksiy Mykhaylychenko (c)
LM	10	Igor Dobrovolski	(yellow card) 70'
SS	15	Igor Kolyvanov
CF	14	Volodymyr Lyutyi		(substituted off) 46'
Substitutions:
DF	20	Andrei Ivanov		(substituted on) 86'
DF	18	Viktor Onopko		(substituted on) 46'
Manager:
Anatoliy Byshovets

GK	1	Bodo Illgner
SW	5	Manfred Binz
CB	2	Stefan Reuter	(substituted off) 65'
CB	4	Jürgen Kohler
CB	3	Andreas Brehme
RM	10	Thomas Doll
CM	17	Stefan Effenberg
CM	6	Guido Buchwald
LM	8	Thomas Häßler
CF	9	Rudi Völler (c)	(substituted off) 46'
CF	11	Karl-Heinz Riedle
Substitutions:
MF	7	Andreas Möller	(substituted on) 46'
FW	18	Jürgen Klinsmann	(substituted on) 65'
Manager:
Berti Vogts

Linesmen:
Marc Huguenin (France)
Alain Gourdet (France)
Fourth official:
Rémi Harrel (France)

=== Scotland vs Germany ===
15 June 1992
17:15

Scotland	0–2	Germany
	Report	Riedle 29'; Effenberg 47'

Idrottsparken, Norrköping
Attendance: 17,638
Referee: Guy Goethals (Belgium)

Scotland	Germany

GK	1	Andy Goram
RB	9	Stewart McKimmie
CB	2	Richard Gough (c)
CB	8	Dave McPherson
LB	4	Maurice Malpas
RM	11	Gary McAllister
CM	3	Paul McStay
CM	10	Stuart McCall	(yellow card) 90'
LM	6	Brian McClair
CF	7	Gordon Durie		(substituted off) 55'
CF	5	Ally McCoist		(substituted off) 68'
Substitutions:
MF	13	Pat Nevin		(substituted on) 55'
FW	14	Kevin Gallacher		(substituted on) 68'
Manager:
Andy Roxburgh

GK	1	Bodo Illgner
SW	5	Manfred Binz
CB	6	Guido Buchwald
CB	4	Jürgen Kohler
RM	8	Thomas Häßler	(yellow card) 87'
CM	17	Stefan Effenberg
CM	16	Matthias Sammer
CM	7	Andreas Möller
LM	3	Andreas Brehme (c)
CF	18	Jürgen Klinsmann
CF	11	Karl-Heinz Riedle		(substituted off) 67'
Substitutions:
DF	2	Stefan Reuter		(substituted on) 67'	(substituted off) 75'
DF	19	Michael Schulz			(substituted on) 75'
Manager:
Berti Vogts

Linesmen:
Pierre Mannaerts (Belgium)
Robert Surkijn (Belgium)
Fourth official:
Frans van den Wijngaert (Belgium)

=== Netherlands vs CIS ===
15 June 1992
20:15

Netherlands	0–0	CIS
	Report

Ullevi, Gothenburg
Attendance: 34,440
Referee: Peter Mikkelsen (Denmark)

Netherlands	CIS

GK	1	Hans van Breukelen
CB	2	Berry van Aerle
CB	4	Ronald Koeman	(yellow card) 26'
CB	3	Adri van Tiggelen
RM	20	Bryan Roy
CM	8	Frank Rijkaard
CM	6	Jan Wouters	(yellow card) 68'
LM	14	Rob Witschge
AM	10	Ruud Gullit (c)		(substituted off) 72'
CF	7	Dennis Bergkamp		(substituted off) 80'
CF	9	Marco van Basten
Substitutions:
MF	11	John van 't Schip		(substituted on) 72'
FW	19	Eric Viscaal		(substituted on) 80'
Manager:
Rinus Michels

GK	1	Dmitri Kharine
SW	4	Akhrik Tsveiba	(yellow card) 22'
CB	2	Andrey Chernyshov
CB	18	Viktor Onopko
CB	5	Oleh Kuznetsov
RM	8	Andrei Kanchelskis
CM	7	Oleksiy Mykhaylychenko (c)
LM	15	Igor Kolyvanov
AM	9	Sergei Aleinikov		(substituted off) 57'
AM	10	Igor Dobrovolski
CF	11	Sergei Yuran		(substituted off) 65'
Substitutions:
MF	16	Dmitri Kuznetsov		(substituted on) 57'
FW	13	Sergei Kiriakov		(substituted on) 65'
Manager:
Anatoliy Byshovets

Linesmen:
Arne Paltoft (Denmark)
Jørgen Ohmeyer (Denmark)
Fourth official:
Kim Milton Nielsen (Denmark)

=== Netherlands vs Germany ===
18 June 1992
20:15

Netherlands	3–1	Germany
Rijkaard 4'; Witschge 15'; Bergkamp 72'	Report	Klinsmann 53'

Ullevi, Gothenburg
Attendance: 37,725
Referee: Pierluigi Pairetto (Italy)

Netherlands	Germany

GK	1	Hans van Breukelen
SW	4	Ronald Koeman
CB	10	Ruud Gullit (c)
CB	17	Frank de Boer	(substituted off) 61'
CB	3	Adri van Tiggelen
RM	20	Bryan Roy
CM	8	Frank Rijkaard
CM	6	Jan Wouters
LM	14	Rob Witschge
CF	7	Dennis Bergkamp	(substituted off) 87'
CF	9	Marco van Basten
Substitutions:
MF	15	Aron Winter	(substituted on) 61'
MF	16	Peter Bosz	(substituted on) 87'
Manager:
Rinus Michels

GK	1	Bodo Illgner
SW	5	Manfred Binz		(substituted off) 46'
CB	14	Thomas Helmer
CB	4	Jürgen Kohler	(yellow card) 50'
RWB	3	Andreas Brehme (c)
LWB	15	Michael Frontzeck
CM	8	Thomas Häßler
CM	17	Stefan Effenberg
CM	7	Andreas Möller
CF	18	Jürgen Klinsmann
CF	11	Karl-Heinz Riedle		(substituted off) 76'
Substitutions:
MF	16	Matthias Sammer		(substituted on) 46'
MF	10	Thomas Doll		(substituted on) 76'
Manager:
Berti Vogts

Linesmen:
Domenico Ramicone (Italy)
Maurizio Padovan (Italy)
Fourth official:
Tullio Lanese (Italy)

=== Scotland vs CIS ===
18 June 1992
20:15

Scotland	3–0	CIS
McStay 7'; McClair 16'; McAllister 84' (pen.)	Report

Idrottsparken, Norrköping
Attendance: 14,660
Referee: Kurt Röthlisberger (Switzerland)

Scotland	CIS

GK	1	Andy Goram
RB	9	Stewart McKimmie
CB	2	Richard Gough (c)
CB	8	Dave McPherson
LB	15	Tom Boyd
RM	11	Gary McAllister
CM	6	Brian McClair		(substituted off) 65'
CM	3	Paul McStay
LM	10	Stuart McCall	(yellow card) 67'
CF	14	Kevin Gallacher		(substituted off) 79'
CF	5	Ally McCoist
Substitutions:
MF	16	Jim McInally		(substituted on) 65'
MF	13	Pat Nevin		(substituted on) 79'
Manager:
Andy Roxburgh

GK	1	Dmitri Kharine
RB	2	Andrey Chernyshov	(yellow card) 52'
CB	3	Kakhaber Tskhadadze
CB	18	Viktor Onopko
LB	5	Oleh Kuznetsov
RM	8	Andrei Kanchelskis
CM	7	Oleksiy Mykhaylychenko (c)	(yellow card) 85'
LM	13	Sergei Kiriakov		(substituted off) 46'
AM	9	Sergei Aleinikov		(substituted off) 46'
AM	10	Igor Dobrovolski
CF	11	Sergei Yuran
Substitutions:
MF	16	Dmitri Kuznetsov	(yellow card) 84'	(substituted on) 46'
MF	17	Igor Korneev		(substituted on) 46'
Manager:
Anatoliy Byshovets

Linesmen:
Zivanko Popović (Switzerland)
Paul Wyttenbach (Switzerland)
Fourth official:
Bruno Galler (Switzerland)

== See also ==
- Germany at the UEFA European Championship
- Netherlands at the UEFA European Championship
- Scotland at the UEFA European Championship
- Russia at the UEFA European Championship
