= Lars Olsen =

Danish footballer (born 1961)

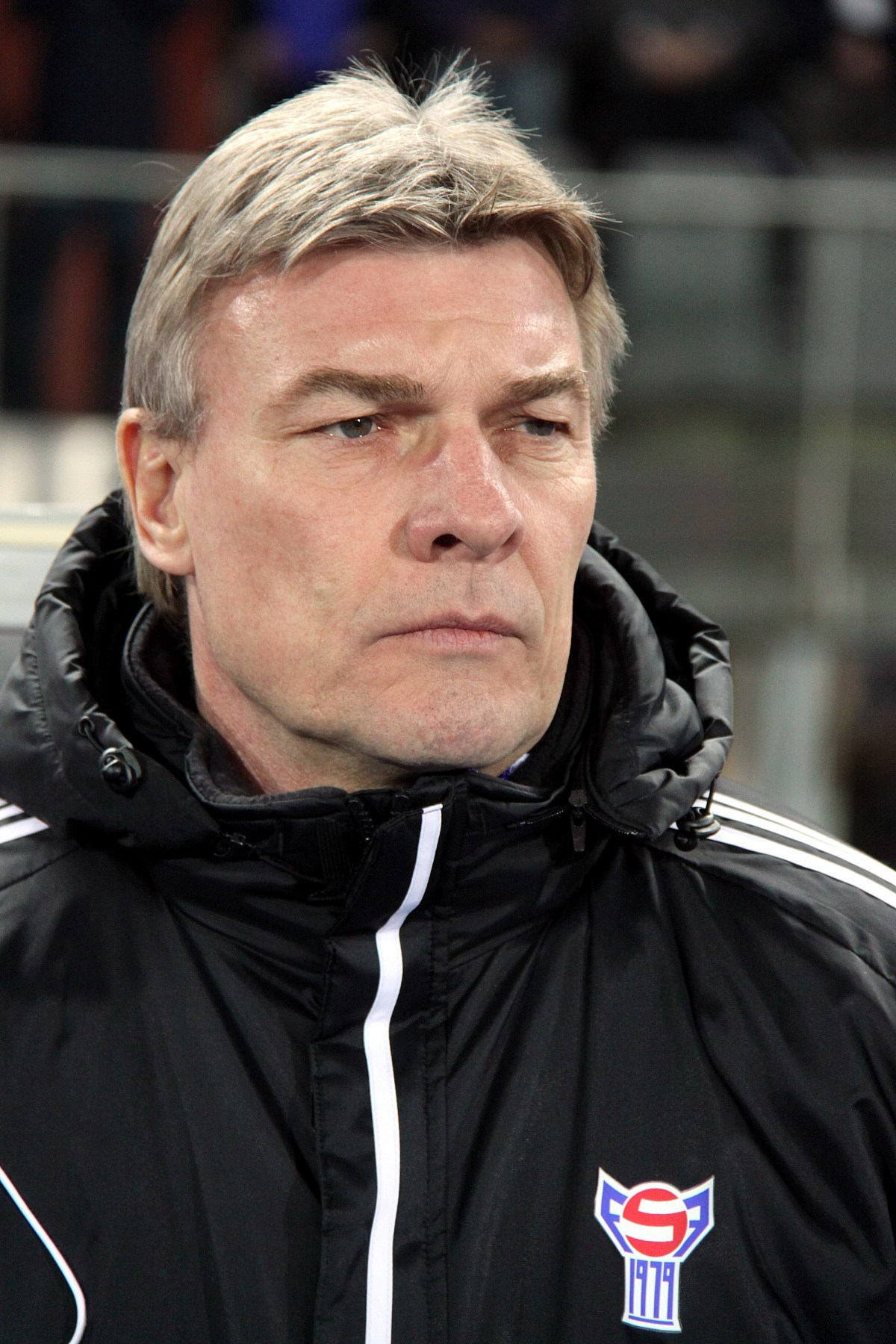
- Olsen in 2013

Personal information
- Full name: Lars Christian Olsen
- Date of birth: 2 February 1961 (age 65)
- Place of birth: Glostrup, Denmark
- Height: 1.82 m (6 ft 0 in)
- Position: Centre back

Youth career
- 1980–1981: Glostrup

Senior career*
Years	Team	Apps	(Gls)
1981–1985	Køge	105	(11)
1985–1991	Brøndby	178	(13)
1991–1992	Trabzonspor	30	(0)
1992–1994	Seraing	62	(0)
1994–1996	Basel	40	(1)
1996	Brøndby	20	(1)
Total		435	(26)

International career
1977	Denmark U17	3	(0)
1978	Denmark U19	3	(0)
1981–1986	Denmark U21	10	(1)
1986–1996	Denmark	84	(4)

Managerial career
- 1997–2002: Brøndby (various)
- 2003–2007: Randers
- 2007–2010: OB
- 2011–2019: Faroe Islands
- 2019–2020: Esbjerg
Medal record
Men's football
Representing Denmark
UEFA European Championship
Winner	1992 Sweden
CONMEBOL–UEFA Cup of Champions
Runner-up	1993 Argentina
- * Club domestic league appearances and goals

Lars Christian Olsen (born 2 February 1961) is a Danish former footballer and current manager, who was most recently the manager of Esbjerg fB in the Danish Superliga. He started his coaching career with Randers in 2003, guiding them to promotion for the Danish Superliga. He led the team to the 2006 Danish Cup trophy, and Olsen was named 2006 Danish Manager of the Year. He then coached Odense BK from 2007 to 2010.

In his active career, Olsen played in the central defense position. He won six Danish championships with Brøndby IF and the 1992 Turkish Cup with Trabzonspor. Olsen played 84 matches and scored four goals for the Denmark national team from 1986 to 1996, and was named 1988 Danish Player of the Year. He was team captain of the Danish national team in a record 69 matches, and captained the Denmark team that won the 1992 European Championship.

== Club career ==
Born in Glostrup, Olsen started his career at local Danish 3rd Division team Glostrup IF 32 in 1980. He was selected for various national youth teams, and moved to top-flight Danish 1st Division team Køge BK before the 1981 season. He stayed four years at the club, playing 105 games and scoring 11 goals for Køge in the 1st Division. Before the 1985 season, he moved to league rivals Brøndby IF. In his first year at the club, he helped secure Brøndby's first Danish championship.

He won both the 1987 and 1988 Danish championships, and following several games as captain of the national team he received the 1988 Danish Player of the Year award. Having won the 1989 Danish Cup trophy as well as a further two Danish championships, he left Brøndby in 1991. Olsen moved abroad to play for Trabzonspor in Turkey, with whom he won the 1992 Turkish Cup. He moved on to Belgian club R.F.C. Seraing in the summer of 1992.

Olsen joined Basel's first team for their 1994–95 season under head coach Claude Andrey. After playing in six test games, Olsen played his domestic league debut for his new club in the home game in the St. Jakob Stadium on 27 July 1994 as Basel were defeated 1–0 by Lugano. He scored his first goal for the club on 20 November in the away game in the Stadion Allmend against Luzern as Basel won 1–0. During the winter break of the following season Olsen left the club. During his one and a half seasons with Basel, Olsen played a total of 54 games for them scoring just that one goal. 40 of these games were in the Nationalliga A, 2 in the Swiss Cup, 1 was in the 1995 UEFA Intertoto Cup and 11 were friendly games.

Olsen moved back to Brøndby in 1996, where he finished his career winning the 1996 Danish championship, now called the Danish Superliga. He played his last Brøndby game in November 1996.

== International career ==
Olsen was called up by Denmark national team head coach Sepp Piontek in April 1986, and made his national team debut in the 3–0 defeat to Bulgaria. He played his second national team game in May 1987, and went on to become a constant player in the starting line-up.

He was selected to represent Denmark at the 1988 European Championship, where he started the tournament on the bench as Morten Olsen was selected team captain and defensive organizer. Lars Olsen came on as a substitute in Denmark's first game, and went on to play the remaining two games, though Denmark were eliminated from the tournament.

In June 1992, he captained the national team of manager Richard Møller Nielsen in Denmark's first trophy win at the 1992 European Championship. While at Basel, he lost his place in the Danish national team in November 1994. He re-entered the Danish national team in April 1996 and Olsen was chosen to help Denmark defend the trophy at the 1996 European Championship. He did not play any games at the tournament, and he ended his international career in 1996.

== Managerial career ==
Following his retirement from his active career, Olsen managed various teams at Brøndby. He coached the reserve team, he was assistant manager of the first team, and he was youth team manager.

In January 2003, Olsen was signed as manager of Randers in the Danish 1st Division, the second best league in Danish football. He managed the team into promotion for the 2004–05 Superliga season, but the team was relegated after only one year in the Danish top-flight football. He stayed at the club and managed Randers to the 2006 Danish Cup victory, while the club secured promotion for the 2006–07 Superliga season. He was named 2006 Danish Manager of the Year.

In January 2007, Olsen announced he was moving to become manager of league rivals Odense BK (OB), effective from July 2007. He managed OB into second place of the 2008–09 Superliga season, and was nominated for the 2009 Danish Manager of the Year award. In September 2010 he and OB sports director Kim Brink were fired due to lacking results.

In November 2011, Olsen moved into international football management by taking over the Faroe Islands becoming the third Dane to do so after Allan Simonsen and Henrik Larsen. During his tenure he has led the small nation to a number of notable victories. His first victory was against Gibraltar in a friendly match before two UEFA Euro 2016 qualifying wins against Greece.

On 28 October 2019, Olsen was named new manager of Danish Superliga side Esbjerg fB. It was announced that he would remain manager of the Faroe Islands until the end of the UEFA Euro 2020 qualifying in November 2019. Following a poor stint that saw Esbjerg placed in the relegation round, Olsen was sacked on 9 June 2020.

== Personal life ==
His son, Ricki Olsen, is a professional footballer.

== Honours ==
=== Player ===
Brøndby IF

- Danish 1st Division / Danish Superliga (6): 1985, 1987, 1988, 1990, 1991, 1995–96
- Danish Cup: 1988–89

Trabzonspor

- Turkish Cup: 1991–92

Denmark

- UEFA European Football Championship: 1992

Individual

- Danish Football Player of the Year: 1988

=== Manager ===
Randers

- Danish Cup: 2005–06

== Managerial statistics ==
As of match played 18 November 2019

Team	From	To	Record				
Team	From	To	G	W	D	L	Win %
Faroe Islands	2011	2019	57	9	7	41	15.79
