= Alexey Spirin =

Russian football referee (1952–2024)

Spirin at the 1990 World Cup in Italy

Alexey Nikolayevich Spirin (Russian: Алексей Николаевич Спирин; 4 January 1952 – 31 January 2024) was a Russian football referee. He refereed one match in the 1990 FIFA World Cup in Italy and the opening game of Euro 1992. Spirin was born in Ruzayevka, Mordovian ASSR, Russian SFSR, Soviet Union on 4 January 1952, and died on 31 January 2024, at the age of 72.

== Sources ==
- (in German)
