= Torben Frank =

Danish footballer (born 1968)

Personal information
- Full name: Torben Frank
- Date of birth: 16 June 1968 (age 58)
- Place of birth: Copenhagen, Denmark
- Position: Striker

Youth career
- Vallensbæk IF

Senior career*
Years	Team	Apps	(Gls)
1986–1991	Brøndby IF	111	(52)
1991–1992	Lyngby BK	32	(15)
1992–1995	Olympique Lyonnais	0	(0)
1995–1997	Lyngby FC	13	(1)
1997–1998	BK Frem	48	(19)
1998	Køge BK	4	(1)

International career
1988–1989	Denmark U-21	7	(2)
1991–1992	Denmark	5	(0)
Medal record
Men's football
Representing Denmark
UEFA European Championship
Winner	1992 Sweden
- * Club domestic league appearances and goals

Torben Frank (born 16 June 1968) is a Danish former footballer, who played in the striker role. He most successfully played for Danish clubs Lyngby Boldklub and Brøndby IF, and won four Danish championships. In addition, Frank received 5 international caps for the Denmark national football team and was a part of the Danish team that won the 1992 European Championship.

Frank started playing football for Vallensbæk IF. In 1986, he signed his first contract with Brøndby IF, with whom he went on to win three Danish championships. He moved to league rivals Lyngby Boldklub in January 1991. In April, he made his debut for the Danish national team, in a friendly match against Bulgaria, and was a part of the Danish championship winning Lyngby team in 1992. He was selected to represent Denmark at the 1992 UEFA European Championship, and played in two of five games, as Denmark won the tournament.

After Euro 92, Frank moved abroad to play for Olympique Lyonnais in France. He was injured during preliminary physical tests in Lyon, and never got to play for the club. Lyon wanted out of the contract, and a legal battle between club and FIFA ensued. In 1995, Frank moved on, returning to Lyngby, but never recovered his form prior to the injury. He went on to play for Boldklubben Frem in 1997, and ended his career in 1998.

== Honours ==
- Danish Championship : 1987, 1988, 1990 and 1992
- 1992 European Championship
