= Bruno Galler =

Swiss football referee (born 1946)

- Born: 21 October 1946 (age 80); Baden, Switzerland
- Other occupation: Teacher

Domestic
Years	League	Role
1974–1993	Swiss Nationalliga A	Referee

International
Years	League	Role
1977–1993	FIFA-listed	Referee

Bruno Galler (born 21 October 1946 in Baden) is a retired football referee from Switzerland. He refereed one match in the 1982 FIFA World Cup in Spain (West Germany vs. Chile, 4–1). He also refereed the Cup Winners final on 9 May 1990, at Gothenborg (Sampdoria Genova vs. Anderlecht, 2–0 a.e.t.), and the European Football Championship final on 26 June 1992, also at Gothenborg (Denmark vs. Germany, 2–0).

In 1982, Galler took charge of the first leg of the "Supercup" match of Barcelona vs. Aston Villa (1–0). On 1 November 1983, he was suspended for three months by the Swiss Football Association when he didn't abandon a match in first Swiss League (Kuesnacht vs Duebendorf, 17 September 1983). On 27 September 1989, when refereed the UEFA-Cup match between Ajax and Austria Vienna, he abandoned the match in the 104th minute (score 1–1) after an iron bar was thrown at Vienna's goalkeeper, Franz Wohlfahrt. Galler also refereed a German Bundesliga match between Borussia Dortmund and Waldhof Mannheim (2–0) on 30 March 1990.

Preceded by 1988 Michel Vautrot	UEFA European Football Championship final referees 1992	Succeeded by 1996 Pierluigi Pairetto
Preceded by 1989 George Courtney	UEFA Cup Winners' Cup Final referee 1990	Succeeded by 1991 Bo Karlsson
