= John Sivebæk =

Danish footballer (born 1961)

Personal information
- Date of birth: 25 October 1961 (age 64)
- Place of birth: Vejle, Denmark
- Height: 1.83 m (6 ft 0 in)
- Position: Right-back

Youth career
- 1969–1980: Vejle

Senior career*
Years	Team	Apps	(Gls)
1980–1985	Vejle	296	(41)
1986–1987	Manchester United	31	(1)
1987–1991	Saint-Étienne	129	(1)
1991–1992	AS Monaco	23	(0)
1992–1994	Pescara	61	(2)
1994–1996	Vejle	28	(0)
1996–1997	AGF	27	(0)
Total		595	(45)

International career
1978–1980	Denmark U-19	21	(3)
1980–1983	Denmark U-21	13	(0)
1982–1992	Denmark	87	(1)
Medal record
Men's football
Representing Denmark
UEFA European Championship
Winner	1992 Sweden
- * Club domestic league appearances and goals

John Sivebæk (born 25 October 1961) is a Danish former professional footballer who played as a right-back. He won the 1984 Danish championship with Vejle Boldklub and played for English club Manchester United. He scored one goal in 87 appearances for the Denmark national team, and represented his country at the 1986 World Cup as well as three European Championships, including the triumphant 1992 European Championship tournament.

Sivebæk has two sons, Christian Sivebæk the eldest of the sons, is also a professional football player.

== Biography ==
Sivebæk was born in Vejle, and started his career with hometown club Vejle Boldklub in 1980, where he enjoyed a goalscoring debut versus Køge BK in a 1-1 draw. He was a part of the Vejle team that won the 1981 Danish Cup. He made his debut for the Danish national team in a May 1982 friendly match against Sweden. He was a part of the Danish squad at the 1984 European Championship, where he played in three of Denmark's four games.

He and Vejle won the 1984 Danish championship trophy, and he scored his only international goal, in a 1986 World Cup qualification game against the Republic of Ireland in November 1985. In the winter 1985, Sivebæk moved to England to play for Manchester United, joining fellow Dane Jesper Olsen. During the medical check it was discovered he had a heart condition, which almost cancelled the transfer. After extensive analysis, the club however decided to sign him despite the failed medical. On 22 November 1986, he scored his first and only goal for Manchester United, a direct free-kick in a 1–0 home win against Queens Park Rangers, which was also the first Manchester United goal under newly hired manager Alex Ferguson. In his time at Manchester United, he was selected to represent Denmark at the 1986 World Cup, where he played two of Denmark's four games before elimination.

In 1987, Sivebæk was told he would not be a first team regular at Manchester United, and he moved to French club AS Saint-Étienne. While at Saint-Étienne, he was selected for the 1988 European Championship, where he played two of Denmark's three games. In 1991, he changed from Saint-Étienne to league rivals AS Monaco. While at Monaco, he was called up to the Danish squad for the 1992 European Championship. He played full-time in Denmark's first four games and helped the team reach the final against Germany. He took part in the final, but suffered an injury and was substituted in favour of Claus Christiansen, and watched from the bench as Denmark won 2–0. He ended his national team career later that year, following the 1994 World Cup qualification game against Northern Ireland in November 1992.

He went to Italy to play for Pescara Calcio in 1992. He moved back to Denmark in 1994, to play for childhood club Vejle BK. He played a single season for Vejle, for a total 226 games and 23 goals for the club. He ended his career with Danish club AGF Aarhus in 1997. After retiring, he became a football agent with Proactive Scandinavia.

== Honours ==
Vejle

- Danish championship: 1984
- Danish Cup: 1981

Denmark

- 1992 European Championship
