= 1988 Danish 1st Division =

43rd season of Danish 1st Division

Danish 1st Division
- Season: 1988

The 1988 Danish 1st Division season was the 43rd season of the Danish 1st Division league championship, governed by the Danish Football Association.

The Danish champions qualified for the European Cup 1989-90 qualification, while the second placed team qualified for the qualification round of the UEFA Cup 1989-90. The two lowest placed teams of the tournament was directly relegated to the Danish 2nd Division. Likewise, the Danish 2nd Division champions and runners-up were promoted to the 1st Division.

== Table ==
| Pos | Team | Pld | W | D | L | GF | GA | GD | Pts |
|---|---|---|---|---|---|---|---|---|---|
| 1 | Brøndby IF | 26 | 17 | 6 | 3 | 57 | 22 | +35 | 40 |
| 2 | Næstved IF | 26 | 13 | 9 | 4 | 41 | 26 | +15 | 35 |
| 3 | Lyngby BK | 26 | 15 | 5 | 6 | 41 | 27 | +14 | 35 |
| 4 | B 1903 | 26 | 12 | 8 | 6 | 44 | 27 | +17 | 32 |
| 5 | Vejle BK | 26 | 10 | 10 | 6 | 36 | 24 | +12 | 30 |
| 6 | Odense BK | 26 | 12 | 5 | 9 | 47 | 36 | +11 | 29 |
| 7 | Herfølge BK | 26 | 11 | 7 | 8 | 30 | 30 | 0 | 29 |
| 8 | Aarhus GF | 26 | 11 | 6 | 9 | 37 | 29 | +8 | 28 |
| 9 | Silkeborg IF | 26 | 11 | 4 | 11 | 39 | 35 | +4 | 26 |
| 10 | Ikast FS | 26 | 8 | 6 | 12 | 35 | 39 | −4 | 22 |
| 11 | Aalborg BK | 26 | 8 | 6 | 12 | 33 | 50 | −17 | 22 |
| 12 | Brønshøj BK | 26 | 8 | 4 | 14 | 38 | 48 | −10 | 20 |
| 13 | KB | 26 | 3 | 2 | 21 | 27 | 66 | −39 | 8 |
| 14 | Randers Freja | 26 | 2 | 4 | 20 | 28 | 74 | −46 | 8 |

== Results ==
| Home \ Away | AaB | AGF | BIF | BBK | B03 | HBK | IFS | KBK | LBK | NIF | OB | RSF | SIF | VBK |
|---|---|---|---|---|---|---|---|---|---|---|---|---|---|---|
| Aalborg BK | — | 0–0 | 0–3 | 3–0 | 1–1 | 4–2 | 0–3 | 2–1 | 0–1 | 1–1 | 0–2 | 3–1 | 2–1 | 2–3 |
| Aarhus GF | 5–1 | — | 3–2 | 3–1 | 2–2 | 1–2 | 2–0 | 3–0 | 0–1 | 2–3 | 1–2 | 2–1 | 0–1 | 0–1 |
| Brøndby IF | 2–0 | 1–0 | — | 4–1 | 1–1 | 1–1 | 2–1 | 3–1 | 6–2 | 3–5 | 2–1 | 4–2 | 1–0 | 0–0 |
| Brønshøj BK | 5–2 | 2–4 | 1–5 | — | 2–2 | 0–0 | 2–1 | 1–2 | 3–0 | 1–2 | 3–1 | 0–0 | 4–1 | 1–2 |
| B 1903 | 6–1 | 1–1 | 0–0 | 2–0 | — | 2–0 | 0–2 | 2–0 | 5–0 | 0–2 | 2–2 | 4–3 | 1–2 | 0–2 |
| Herfølge BK | 1–0 | 0–2 | 1–2 | 1–0 | 0–1 | — | 3–0 | 2–0 | 0–1 | 2–0 | 2–1 | 1–0 | 1–2 | 2–1 |
| Ikast FS | 4–5 | 0–0 | 0–4 | 0–3 | 0–1 | 1–1 | — | 5–3 | 0–0 | 4–0 | 2–0 | 0–0 | 1–4 | 0–3 |
| Kjøbenhavns BK | 2–2 | 0–1 | 0–3 | 1–2 | 1–3 | 2–3 | 1–2 | — | 1–6 | 1–1 | 1–5 | 3–1 | 1–3 | 0–3 |
| Lyngby BK | 1–2 | 2–0 | 0–1 | 1–0 | 2–0 | 1–1 | 0–0 | 2–1 | — | 1–1 | 2–1 | 7–1 | 1–0 | 3–0 |
| Næstved IF | 1–0 | 2–2 | 0–0 | 3–0 | 0–1 | 0–0 | 0–0 | 1–0 | 2–1 | — | 2–0 | 3–1 | 1–0 | 0–0 |
| Odense BK | 0–0 | 4–0 | 1–3 | 2–1 | 1–0 | 1–1 | 0–4 | 4–1 | 2–2 | 2–1 | — | 3–0 | 2–1 | 1–0 |
| Randers Freja | 3–0 | 0–2 | 0–4 | 1–1 | 0–4 | 1–2 | 1–4 | 1–3 | 0–2 | 2–5 | 1–6 | — | 3–3 | 0–3 |
| Silkeborg IF | 1–1 | 0–1 | 1–0 | 1–2 | 1–2 | 5–0 | 1–0 | 3–1 | 0–1 | 0–3 | 2–1 | 4–3 | — | 1–1 |
| Vejle BK | 0–1 | 0–0 | 0–0 | 4–2 | 1–1 | 1–1 | 3–1 | 2–0 | 0–1 | 2–2 | 2–2 | 1–2 | 1–1 | — |

Legend: Blue = home team win; Yellow = draw; Red = away team win.

== Top goalscorers ==
| Position | Player | Club | Goals |
|---|---|---|---|
| 1 | Bent Christensen | Brøndby IF | 21 |
