= Torben Piechnik =

Danish footballer (born 1963)

Personal information
- Date of birth: 21 May 1963 (age 63)
- Place of birth: Hellerup, Denmark
- Position: Centre back

Senior career*
Years	Team	Apps	(Gls)
1980–1987	KB	175	
1988–1989	Ikast fS	43	(3)
1990–1992	B 1903	67	(8)
1992	Copenhagen	7	(0)
1992–1994	Liverpool	17	(0)
1994–1999	AGF	113	(9)

International career
1991–1996	Denmark	15	(0)
Medal record
Men's football
Representing Denmark
UEFA European Championship
Winner	1992 Sweden
CONMEBOL–UEFA Cup of Champions
Runner-up	1993 Argentina
- * Club domestic league appearances and goals

Torben Piechnik (Danish pronunciation: [ˈtsʰoɐ̯.pʰn̩ ˈpʰiː.e̝k.nik]; born 21 May 1963) is a Danish former professional footballer who played as a centre back. He made a total of 15 appearances for the Denmark national team, which he represented in the 1992 European Championship and 1996 European Championship.

== Biography ==
Born in Hellerup, Piechnik started his senior career with Kjøbenhavns Boldklub (KB) in the top-flight Danish 1st Division. He joined Ikast fS in 1988, and played two seasons for the club. In 1990, he joined B 1903, and in November 1991 he won his first Danish senior cap. He was part of the Denmark national team which won the UEFA Euro 1992. He started the tournament as a substitute, but when Henrik Andersen suffered an injury in the semi-finals, (ultimately, Andersen would miss the final due to suspension in any event), Piechnik replaced him in the final, for which he earned praise.

After the tournament, he followed the majority of the B 1903 players into the merging FC Copenhagen (FCK) club. Having played just seven league games for FCK, he was signed for English FA Cup holders Liverpool by manager Graeme Souness in September 1992, just weeks after the inception of the new Premier League. He joined a struggling Liverpool side, and had a hard time adapting to the English game. Piechnik made 16 first-team league appearances for Liverpool in the 1992–93 season, but only managed one in the whole of the 1993–94 season. When Graeme Souness was replaced by new manager Roy Evans in January 1994, Piechnik sensed that he was no longer part of the club's plans, and requested a transfer. His lack of success in Liverpool later earned him a selection in the Liverpool Echo's Merseyside Lost 11, a selection of players which the newspaper considered the biggest fiascos in the history of Liverpool and Everton.

He transferred to AGF in Denmark at the end of the season. He won the 1995–96 Danish Cup with AGF, and was called up to represent Denmark at the UEFA Euro 1996. He played the last of his 15 international matches at that tournament, before ending his national team career. He would play on for another three years at AGF, before retiring in 1999.

He has worked as both a real estate agent and masseur, while still playing "Old Boys" football in Denmark.

== Honours ==
AGF

- Danish Cup: 1995–96

Denmark

- UEFA European Championship: 1992
