= Henrik Larsen =

Danish footballer and manager (born 1966)

Personal information
- Full name: Henrik Larsen
- Date of birth: 17 May 1966 (age 60)
- Place of birth: Kongens Lyngby, Denmark
- Height: 1.88 m (6 ft 2 in)
- Position: Midfielder

Senior career*
Years	Team	Apps	(Gls)
1983–1984	Hellerup	26	(2)
1984–1990	Lyngby	132	(10)
1990–1995	Pisa	41	(1)
1991–1992	→ Lyngby (loan)	29	(5)
1993	→ Aston Villa (loan)	0	(0)
1993–1994	→ Waldhof Mannheim (loan)	33	(5)
1995–1996	Lyngby	54	(18)
1996–1999	Copenhagen	53	(6)
Total		368	(47)

International career
1989–1996	Denmark	39	(5)

Managerial career
- 2000–2002: Ølstykke FC
- 2002–2005: Faroe Islands
- 2006: Holbæk B&I (caretaker)
- 2006–2008: Køge BK
- 2008–2009: Lyngby BK
- 2009: Randers FC (Assistant coach)
- 2010–2015: Lyngby BK U19 (assistant)
Medal record
Men's football
Representing Denmark
UEFA European Championship
Winner	1992 Sweden
CONMEBOL–UEFA Cup of Champions
Runner-up	1993 Argentina
- * Club domestic league appearances and goals

Henrik Larsen (born 17 May 1966), nicknamed Store Larsen (Big Larsen), is a Danish football manager and former professional player who played as a midfielder. He was last the manager of Lyngby Boldklub.

He was the joint top scorer at the UEFA Euro 1992 which he won with the Denmark national team. He was also part of the Danish squad at Euro 96 where he played his last national team game. In all, he played 39 national team matches and scored five goals.

== Club career ==
Larsen was born in Lyngby. He started his career in Denmark for Taarbæk IF and then later Lyngby Boldklub. He won the 1985 Danish Cup trophy with Lyngby and made his Danish national team debut in February 1989. In April 1990, he agreed a move abroad to play for Italian club Pisa Calcio, who were leading the promotion battle in the secondary Serie B division. Larsen was named Man of the Match, as he won the 1990 Danish Cup with Lyngby before moving to Italy in June 1990. He joined Pisa in the Serie A championship, but in his first year at the club, Pisa were relegated to the Serie B again. As Serie B regulations only allowed two foreign players in the team, Larsen had to look for playing time elsewhere, when the club preferred Argentinians Diego Simeone and Jose Chamot. He was loaned back to Lyngby in 1991-92 season, where he won the Danish Championship.

After the Euro 92 tournament, Larsen moved back to Pisa in the Serie B. Simeone had been sold, but following the first few league games for the club, Larsen was put on sale. A number of European clubs were interested in him, but Pisa's pricetag of DKK 50 million kept all interest at bay. Larsen eventually moved to Aston Villa FC in England on a loan deal in January 1993. His stay in Aston Villa was short, as he had trouble forcing his way into the team under manager Ron Atkinson. In March 1993, he was told by Atkinson he wasn't needed, but as Pisa didn't want him back, he stayed at Villa's reserve team until May 1993.

He was loaned out to German club Waldhof Mannheim in the 2. Bundesliga in 1993, where he played well. He returned to Denmark in 1994 to play for Lyngby on a season-long loan deal. Larsen was set free from his Pisa contract in February 1995, when his transfer rights were given to Lyngby. He was called up for the Danish squad for Euro 96, by national manager Møller Nielsen. He took part in all three of Denmark's matches before ending his national team career when Denmark was eliminated. After Euro 96, he moved to league rivals FC Copenhagen, with whom he won the 1997 Danish Cup. He ended his career in 1999.

== International career ==
Larsen went on a season-long loan deal back in Lyngby, where he helped the club win the 1992 Danish Superliga championship. He was selected for the Danish team to compete at the Euro 92 tournament. He started the tournament as a substitute, but Larsen went on to score three goals at Euro 92, including both goals in the 2–2 semi-final draw against the Netherlands. He scored at his attempt in the ensuing penalty shootout, and played full-time when he and the Danish national team won the final against Germany.

== Coaching career ==
Following his retirement, he became assistant coach at FC Copenhagen, before managing Ølstykke FC. He was head coach of the Faroe Islands national team until 2005, as well as associated coach of the talent team in Lyngby Boldklub, for whose old boys team he is also playing. In 2006, he was caretaker manager in Holbæk B&I, before signing on with Køge Boldklub in June 2006 and was here coach until June 2008. Larsen was named as the new head coach from Lyngby Boldklub on 15 July 2008 and was then fired after eight months on 30 March 2009. He was the new assistant manager at the Danish football club Randers FC, when the season 2009–10 started, together with another Danish football legend Flemming Povlsen. They were both assistant managers for the Randers FC manager John Faxe Jensen but the trio was fired on 6 October 2009.

== Personal life ==
In 1998, he announced he was marrying an English sports reporter, Sacha Crowther, whom he had met at the UEFA European Championship two years earlier.

== Honours ==
=== Player ===
Lyngby Boldklub

- Danish Cup: 1984–85, 1989–90
- Danish Superliga: 1991–92

Copenhagen

- Danish Cup: 1996–97

Denmark

- European Championship: 1992

== Managerial statistics ==
As of 16 June 2016

Team	Nat	From	To	Record				
Team	Nat	From	To	G	W	D	L	Win %
Faroe Islands	(Faroe Islands)	2002	2005	26	5	2	19	19.23
