= Kim Vilfort =

Danish retired footballer (born 1962)

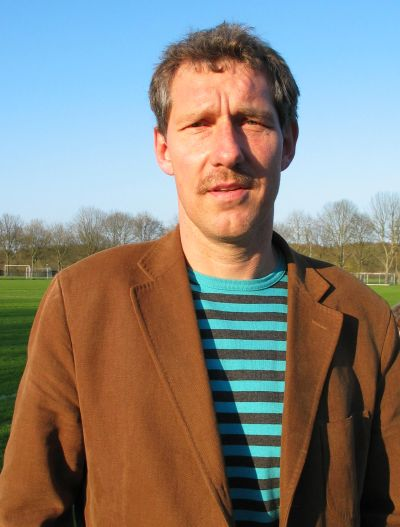
- Vilfort at Værløse Stadion in 2006

Personal information
- Full name: Kim Vilfort
- Date of birth: 15 November 1962 (age 63)
- Place of birth: Valby, Denmark
- Height: 1.90 m (6 ft 3 in)
- Position: Midfielder

Youth career
- Skovlunde IF

Senior career*
Years	Team	Apps	(Gls)
1979–1981	Skovlunde IF		
1981–1985	BK Frem	73	(42)
1985–1986	Lille	24	(1)
1986–1998	Brøndby	340	(77)
Total		437	(120)

International career
1982–1983	Denmark U21	6	(2)
1983–1996	Denmark	77	(14)
Medal record
Men's football
Representing Denmark
UEFA European Championship
Winner	1992 Sweden
CONMEBOL–UEFA Cup of Champions
Runner-up	1993 Argentina
- * Club domestic league appearances and goals

Kim Vilfort (Danish pronunciation: [ˈvilfɒːt]; born 15 November 1962) is a Danish retired professional footballer who played as a midfielder. He is the head talent scout at Brøndby IF.

His 17-year professional career was mainly associated with Brøndby IF, for which he played in 470 official games – being the club's top scorer in history – and won ten major titles.

Vilfort played for more than one decade with Denmark, and earned 77 caps. He was an essential figure in the nation's Euro 1992 conquest, and represented the country in three European Championships.

== Club career ==
Born in the Copenhagen-quarter of Valby, Vilfort started playing football as a boy in Skovlunde IF, usually as a striker. He moved to Boldklubben Frem in 1981, appearing in four top division seasons with the club.

After spending the 1985–86 campaign in France with Lille OSC – only one Ligue 1 goal, club finished in tenth position – Vilfort returned to his country and signed for defending champions Brøndby IF, where he would play out the rest of his career as an attacking midfielder; in the 1986–87 European Cup, the first-ever European competition participation for the team, he scored two goals to help them reach the third round.

1991 was an outstanding year for Vilfort: he helped Brøndby reach the semi-final in the UEFA Cup, appeared in 55 league games in the 1991 Danish Superliga and the 1991–92 Danish Superliga combined – the latter had been recently created – and scored nine times, going on to be named both Brøndby's Player of the Year and Danish Player of the Year.

From 1996 to 1998, veteran Vilfort won a further two Danish championships with Brøndby. His contract expired on 1 June 1998 after the last game of the 1997–98 campaign, where he scored the winning goal (a flying header) in a 1–0 win against Odense BK; at the time, only Bjarne Jensen had played more games than him for the club (556), and he would only be overtaken by Per Nielsen more than one decade later. His 78 league goals were second only to Bent Christensen, but he ranked first in overall goals scored for the organization, at 110.

Following his retirement at nearly 36, Vilfort became the head of Brøndby's youth system, where his sons Mikkel and Kasper would also play. The club's home ground, Brøndby Stadium, was nicknamed by its fans Vilfort Park.

== International career ==
Vilfort made his debut for the Denmark national team on 5 October 1983, in a 1–0 defeat against Poland for the 1984 Summer Olympics qualification. He played twice for the national team at UEFA Euro 1988, in an eventual group stage exit.

In the Euro 1992 tournament in Sweden, Vilfort was a nuclear unit for the Danes, being one of the few offensive players in the team's otherwise defensive strategy. He played four of five matches in the competition, having to leave training camp to visit his leukemia-stricken 7-year-old daughter whose condition was deteriorating, thus missing the group stage decider against France (2–1 win).

Vilfort was twice sent by his family to rejoin his teammates in time to play, and appeared in the semifinal victory against the Netherlands (scoring in the penalty shootout) and again in the final against Germany (scoring the second goal) for the 2–0 shock triumph; Line Vilfort died shortly after the tournament.

After Denmark missed qualification for the 1994 FIFA World Cup, Vilfort represented the nation at Euro 1996. Following the 3–0 group stage loss to Croatia on 16 June, the team was eliminated and the 33-year-old ended his international career to concentrate on Brøndby.

== Honours ==
Brøndby

- Danish League: 1987, 1988, 1990, 1991, 1995–96, 1996–97, 1997–98
- Danish Cup: 1988–89, 1993–94, 1997–98

Denmark

- UEFA European Championship: 1992

Individual

- Danish Player of the Year: 1991
- Brøndby Player of the Year: 1991
- Danish Superliga: Player of the Century 2014
