= Flemming Povlsen =

Danish footballer (born 1966)

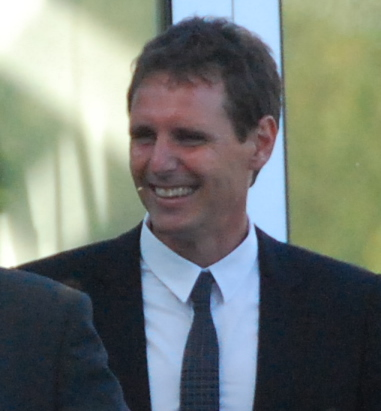
- Povlsen in 2011

Personal information
- Full name: Flemming Søgaard Povlsen
- Date of birth: 3 December 1966 (age 59)
- Place of birth: Brabrand, Denmark
- Height: 1.82 m (6 ft 0 in)
- Position: Forward

Youth career
- Viby IF

Senior career*
Years	Team	Apps	(Gls)
1984–1986	AGF Aarhus	40	(13)
1986–1987	Castilla CF	40	(10)
1987–1989	1. FC Köln	71	(19)
1989–1990	PSV Eindhoven	30	(10)
1990–1995	Borussia Dortmund	116	(20)
1998–2004	Brabrand IF	40	(15)
Total		337	(87)

International career
1985–1987	Denmark U-21	9	(2)
1987–1994	Denmark	62	(21)

Managerial career
- 2005–2009: AC Horsens (assistant manager)
- 2009: Randers FC (assistant manager)
- 2010–2012: Silkeborg IF (assistant manager)
- 2013–2014: OB (assistant manager)
- 2014–2015: AGF (Attacking coach)
Medal record
Men's football
Representing Denmark
UEFA European Championship
Winner	1992 Sweden
- * Club domestic league appearances and goals

Flemming Søgaard Povlsen (born 3 December 1966) is a Danish football pundit and former professional footballer who played as a striker. Born in Aarhus and a youth product of Viby IF, Povlsen also played in The Netherlands, Spain and Germany, until a knee injury forced him to retire, at only 28 years of age. Before the injury, Povlsen rose to prominence at FC Cologne, before settling at Borussia Dortmund, with whom he won the 1995 Bundesliga and played the final half of his career. At an international level, he was among the profiles on the Denmark squad that won the 1992 UEFA European Football Championship.

== Club career ==
Povlsen started playing football in local town Viby, but moved on to Danish top-flight club AGF Aarhus in 1984. In 1985, he was awarded the Danish 1st Division Revelation of the Year. He moved abroad in 1986, when he signed for Spanish club Castilla CF, the reserve team of multiple European champions Real Madrid. While at Castilla, he made his debut for the Denmark national team in the 5–0 win over Greece in a 1988 Olympic Games qualifier. After only a year at CF Castilla, Povlsen moved on to 1. FC Köln in Germany, where he played alongside fellow Dane Morten Olsen. Even though he wasn't a top goal scoring striker, Povlsen's speed and work rate endeared him to the fans, and he won two sets of silver medals, as the Köln team finished second in the 1988–89 and 1989–90 Bundesliga seasons. Povlsen did not play more than three matches for Köln in the 1989–90 season though, as he was bought by Dutch club PSV Eindhoven in 1989. He played the remainder of the season at PSV, going on to win the Dutch cup and finishing second in the League. He moved back to Germany, where he settled down at Borussia Dortmund in 1990.

Povlsen experienced his greatest success while at Dortmund, and quickly became a fan favourite. However, in an April 1993 game for Dortmund against 1. FC Köln, he tore his anterior cruciate ligament in the knee, and was out for recovery until October of the same year, when he made his come-back against Wattenscheid 09. In a September 1994 match in the DFB-Pokal tournament against 1. FC Kaiserslautern he suffered a cruciate ligament injury in his other knee. Although he had a short appearance in March 1995 against Eintracht Frankfurt, and thus was a part of the 1994–95 Bundesliga winning Dortmund side, Povlsen ended his playing career due to his knee injuries.

== International career ==
Povlsen was a part of the Denmark national team from his debut in 1987 to 1995. He scored 21 goals in his 62 international appearances for Denmark, and played at the 1988 European Championship as well as Euro 1992, the latter in which Denmark unexpectedly beat favourites Germany to become champions. At the time of the 1992 European Championship, Povlsen was enjoying increasing popularity and steady playing time for both club and country. The forward played all five Denmark matches in the tournament, and scored once: In the semi-final penalty shootout against the Netherlands, Povlsen pinned a goal after an intense battle of nerves with Dutch keeper Hans van Breukelen, his former PSV teammate. He stayed a regular international until his unfortunate, career-ending injury in March 1995.

== Coaching career ==
Following his retirement, Flemming Povlsen became a sports director at Danish 1st Division club FC Aarhus in December 2001. As the club underwent economical downsizing in November 2002, Povlsen offered to step down, which the club accepted. He played lower league football in Brabrand and later switched to the old-boys team in his childhood club Aarhus GF. In March 2005, he became part of the coaching staff at Danish Superliga club AC Horsens. In July 2009 he joined as Assistant Coach to Randers FC but resigned on 6 October 2009 when Manager John Jensen was sacked. He also teaches at Hessel Gods Fodboldkostskole, a football school in Jutland.

== Honours ==
Borussia Dortmund

- UEFA Cup: runner-up 1992–93
- Bundesliga: 1994–95; runner-up 1991–92
- DFB-Supercup: 1995

PSV Eindhoven

- KNVB Cup: 1989–90

1. FC Köln

- Bundesliga: runner-up 1988–89, 1989–90

Denmark

- UEFA European Football Championship: 1992
