= UEFA Euro 1992 =

European football competition

1992 UEFA European Football Championship
Europamästerskapet i fotboll Sverige 1992
- Small is Beautiful

Tournament details
- Host country: Sweden
- Dates: 10–26 June
- Teams: 8
- Venues: 4 (in 4 host cities)

Final positions
- Champions: Denmark (1st title)
- Runners-up: Germany
- Third place: Netherlands; Sweden

Tournament statistics
- Matches played: 15
- Goals scored: 32 (2.13 per match)
- Attendance: 430,111 (28,674 per match)
- Top scorer(s): (Denmark) Henrik Larsen (Germany) Karl-Heinz Riedle (Netherlands) Dennis Bergkamp (Sweden) Tomas Brolin (3 goals each)

The 1992 UEFA European Football Championship was hosted by Sweden between 10 and 26 June 1992. It was the ninth UEFA European Championship, which is held every four years and supported by UEFA.

Denmark won the title, having been invited as qualifiers runners-up only after Yugoslavia was disqualified as a result of the breakup of the country and the ensuing warfare there. Eight national teams contested the final tournament.

The CIS national football team (Commonwealth of Independent States), representing the recently dissolved Soviet Union, whose national team had qualified for the tournament, were present at the tournament. It was also the first major tournament in which the reunified Germany (who were beaten 2–0 by Denmark in the final) had competed.

It was the last tournament with only eight participants, to award the winner of a match only two points, and before the introduction of the back-pass rule, the latter of which was brought in immediately after the tournament was completed. When the next competition was held in 1996, 16 teams were involved and were awarded three points for a win.

== Bid process ==
On 16 December 1988, following a decision made by the UEFA Executive Committee, Sweden was chosen over Spain to host the event. Spain was at a disadvantage as they had already been chosen to host the EXPO 1992 in Seville and the 1992 Summer Olympics in Barcelona.

== Summary ==
Seven of the eight teams had to qualify for the final stage; Sweden qualified automatically as hosts of the event. The Soviet Union qualified for the final tournament shortly before the break-up of the country, and took part in the tournament under the banner of the Commonwealth of Independent States (CIS), before the former Soviet republics formed their own national teams after the competition. The CIS team represented the following former Soviet nations: Russia, Ukraine, Belarus, Kazakhstan, Uzbekistan, Turkmenistan, Kyrgyzstan, Armenia, Azerbaijan, Moldova, and Tajikistan. Four out of 15 ex-republics were not members of the CIS: Estonia, Latvia and Lithuania did not send their players; Georgia was not a member of the CIS at the time, but Georgian Kakhaber Tskhadadze was a part of the squad.

Originally, Yugoslavia qualified for the final stage and were about to participate as FR Yugoslavia, but due to the Yugoslav Wars, the team was disqualified and Denmark, as the runners-up from Yugoslavia's qualifying group, was invited to take part instead. After a draw with England and a loss to host nation Sweden, Denmark beat France in their final group match to qualify for the semi-finals, where they faced the reigning European champions, the Netherlands. Denmark led 2–1 going into the last five minutes, but a Frank Rijkaard equaliser meant the game went to a penalty shoot-out; Danish goalkeeper Peter Schmeichel saved Marco van Basten's kick, giving Denmark a 5–4 win on penalties and a place in the final against the reigning world champions, Germany. Denmark won the final 2–0 with goals from John Jensen and Kim Vilfort, one in each half, to claim their first European title.

A Danish film, Summer of '92, was made based on this.

== Qualification ==
Scotland and the hosts Sweden made their respective debuts despite having already made many appearances at the World Cup. France qualified for the first Euro in which they were not the hosts. They played after missing the previous tournament.

As of 2024, this was the last time that the Czech Republic (then Czechoslovakia), Italy, Portugal, and Spain failed to qualify for the European Championship finals.

=== Qualified teams ===
Team	Qualified as	Qualified on	Previous appearances in tournament (Note: Bold indicates champion for that year. Italic indicates host for that year.)
Sweden	Host	16 December 1988	0 (debut)
France	Group 1 winner	12 October 1991	2 (1960, **1984**)
England	Group 7 winner	13 November 1991	3 (1968, 1980, 1988)
CIS (Note: From 1960 to 1988, CIS competed as the Soviet Union.)	Group 3 winner (Note: Replaced the Soviet Union.)	13 November 1991	5 (**1960**, 1964, 1968, 1972, 1988)
Scotland	Group 2 winner	20 November 1991	0 (debut)
Netherlands	Group 6 winner	4 December 1991	3 (1976, 1980, **1988**)
Germany (Note: From 1972 to 1988, Germany competed as West Germany.)	Group 5 winner	18 December 1991	5 (**1972**, 1976, **1980**, 1984, 1988)
Denmark	Group 4 runner-up (Note: Replaced FR Yugoslavia (after qualifying as Yugoslavia), who were subject to sanctions under UN Security Council Resolution 757 and thus banned from appearing.)	31 May 1992	3 (1964, 1984, 1988)

=== Final draw ===
The draw for the final tournament took place on 17 January 1992 in Gothenburg. Only two teams were seeded: Sweden (as hosts) and the Netherlands (as holders). The remaining six teams were all unseeded and could be drawn in any group. Months after the draw, Yugoslavia was banned from participating and replaced by Denmark, which had come second in the qualifying group.

In the draw procedure, the unseeded teams were drawn one by one. The first two were placed in position 4 of each group, the next two in position 3, and the last two in position 2. The two seeded teams were then drawn and placed consecutively into position 1 of the groups.

Pot 1: Seeded teams	Pot 2: Unseeded teams		
Sweden (hosts) (Note: Hosts Sweden were automatically assigned to position A1.); Netherlands (holders) (Note: Defending champions the Netherlands were automatically assigned to position B1.)	CIS; England	France; Germany	Scotland; ~~Yugoslavia~~ (Note: Yugoslavia were to participate in the final tournament but was placed under sanctions on 30 May 1992 by the United Nations Security Council Resolution 757 after the outbreak of Yugoslav Wars. FIFA and UEFA therefore suspended Yugoslavia from competitive football on 31 May 1992, meaning they could not participate in the final tournament. Denmark instead took the spot at the final tournament.)

The draw resulted in the following groups:

Group 1 Sweden France Yugoslavia → Denmark England	Group 2 Netherlands Scotland CIS Germany

== Venues ==
Gothenburg	UEFA Euro 1992 is located in Sweden	Stockholm
Ullevi	UEFA Euro 1992 is located in Sweden	Råsunda Stadium
Capacity: 44,000	UEFA Euro 1992 is located in Sweden	Capacity: 40,000
Malmö	UEFA Euro 1992 is located in Sweden	Norrköping
Malmö Stadion	UEFA Euro 1992 is located in Sweden	Idrottsparken
Capacity: 30,000	UEFA Euro 1992 is located in Sweden	Capacity: 23,000

== Squads ==
Each national team had to submit a squad of 20 players.

== Match ball ==
Adidas Etrusco Unico was used as the official match ball of the tournament. The ball was previously used in the 1990 FIFA World Cup.

== Match officials ==
Country	Referee	Linesmen		Matches refereed
Austria	Hubert Forstinger	Johann Möstl	Alois Pemmer	France 1–2 Denmark
Belgium	Guy Goethals	Pierre Mannaerts	Robert Surkijn	Scotland 0–2 Germany
CIS	Alexey Spirin	Victor Filippov	Andrei Butenko	Sweden 1–1 France
Denmark	Peter Mikkelsen	Arne Paltoft	Jørgen Ohmeyer	Netherlands 0–0 CIS
France	Gérard Biguet	Marc Huguenin	Alain Gourdet	CIS 1–1 Germany
Germany	Aron Schmidhuber	Joachim Ren	Uwe Ennuschat	Sweden 1–0 Denmark
Hungary	Sándor Puhl	László Varga	Sándor Szilágyi	France 0–0 England
Italy	Pierluigi Pairetto	Domenico Ramicone	Maurizio Padovan	Netherlands 3–1 Germany
Italy	Tullio Lanese	Domenico Ramicone	Maurizio Padovan	Sweden 2–3 Germany (Semi-final)
Netherlands	John Blankenstein	Jan Dolstra	Robert Overkleeft	Denmark 0–0 England
Portugal	José Rosa dos Santos	Valdemar Aguiar Pinto Lopes	Antonio Guedes Gomes De Carvalho	Sweden 2–1 England
Spain	Emilio Soriano Aladrén	Francisco García Pacheco	José Luis Iglesia Casas	Netherlands 2–2 Denmark (Semi-final)
Sweden	Bo Karlsson	Lennart Sundqvist	Bo Persson	Netherlands 1–0 Scotland
Switzerland	Kurt Röthlisberger	Zivanko Popović	Paul Wyttenbach	Scotland 3–0 CIS
Switzerland	Bruno Galler	Zivanko Popović	Paul Wyttenbach	Denmark 2–0 Germany (Final)

Fourth officials

Country	Fourth officials
Austria	Gerhard Kapl
Belgium	Frans van den Wijngaert
CIS	Vadim Zhuk
Denmark	Kim Milton Nielsen
France	Rémi Harrel
Germany	Karl-Josef Assenmacher
Hungary	Sándor Varga
Netherlands	Mario van der Ende
Portugal	Jorge Emanuel Monteiro Coroado
Sweden	Leif Sundell

== Group stage ==
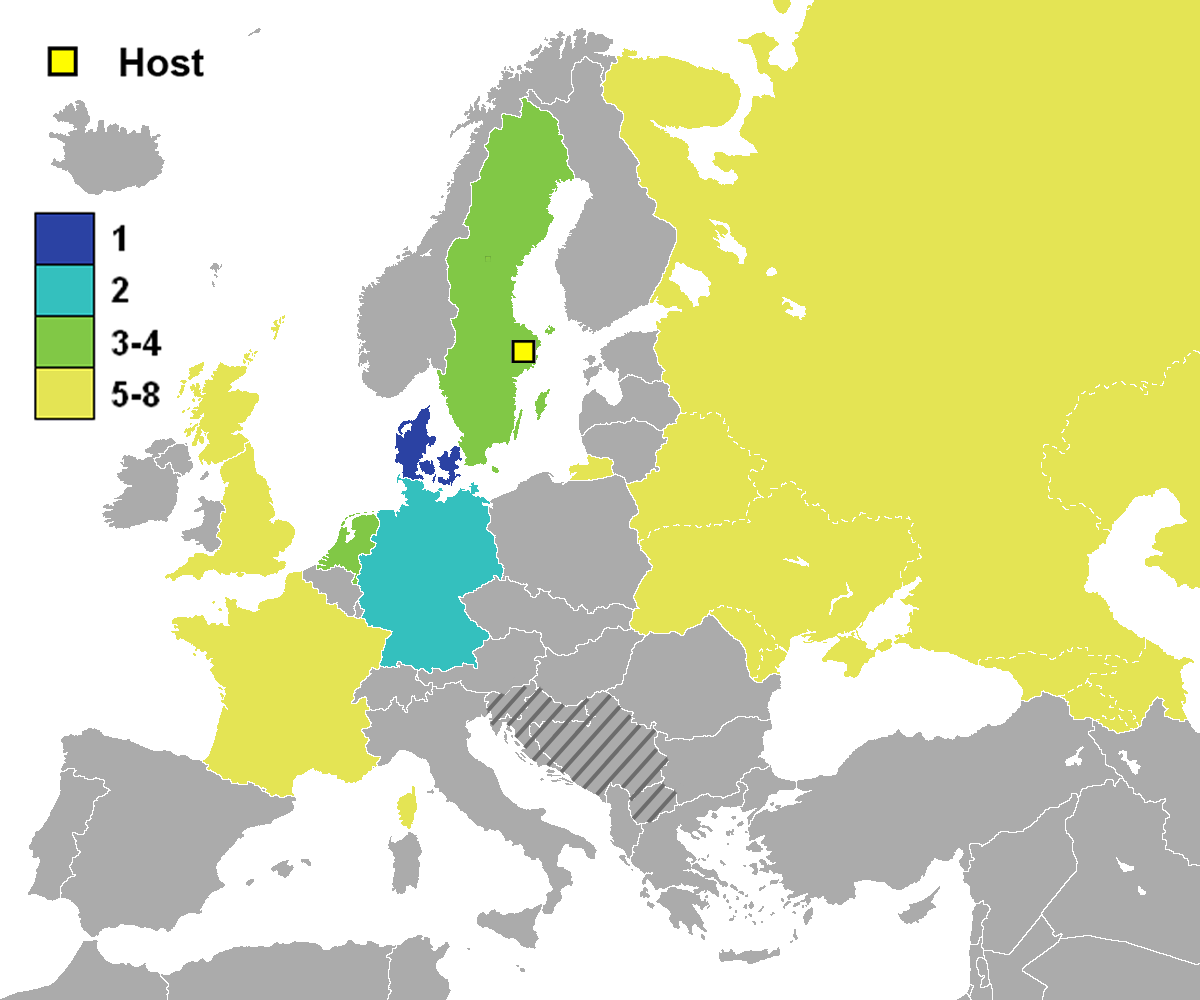
Results. Yugoslavia (stripes) qualified and were going to participate as FR Yugoslavia, but was banned and replaced by Denmark. CIS (yellow on the right side of the map) qualified as Soviet Union.

The teams finishing in the top two positions in each of the two groups progress to the semi-finals, while the bottom two teams in each group were eliminated from the tournament.

All times are local, CEST (UTC+2).

=== Tiebreakers ===
If two or more teams finished level on points after completion of the group matches, the following tie-breakers were used to determine the final ranking:

1. Goal difference in all group matches
2. Greater number of goals scored in all group matches
3. Drawing of lots

=== Group 1 ===
Pos	Team	Pld	W	D	L	GF	GA	GD	Pts	Qualification
1	Sweden (H)	3	2	1	0	4	2	+2	5	Advance to knockout stage
2	Denmark	3	1	1	1	2	2	0	3	Advance to knockout stage
3	France	3	0	2	1	2	3	−1	2	
4	England	3	0	2	1	1	2	−1	2	

Source: UEFA
(H) Hosts
10 June 1992
20:15

Sweden	1–1	France
J. Eriksson 24'	Report	Papin 58'

Råsunda Stadium, Solna
Attendance: 29,860
Referee: Alexey Spirin (CIS)
11 June 1992
20:15

Denmark	0–0	England
	Report

Malmö Stadion, Malmö
Attendance: 26,385
Referee: John Blankenstein (Netherlands)

14 June 1992
17:15

France	0–0	England
	Report

Malmö Stadion, Malmö
Attendance: 26,535
Referee: Sándor Puhl (Hungary)
14 June 1992
20:15

Sweden	1–0	Denmark
Brolin 58'	Report

Råsunda Stadium, Solna
Attendance: 29,902
Referee: Aron Schmidhuber (Germany)

17 June 1992
20:15

Sweden	2–1	England
J. Eriksson 51'; Brolin 82'	Report	Platt 4'

Råsunda Stadium, Solna
Attendance: 30,126
Referee: José Rosa dos Santos (Portugal)
17 June 1992
20:15

France	1–2	Denmark
Papin 60'	Report	Larsen 8'; Elstrup 78'

Malmö Stadion, Malmö
Attendance: 25,763
Referee: Hubert Forstinger (Austria)

=== Group 2 ===
Pos	Team	Pld	W	D	L	GF	GA	GD	Pts	Qualification
1	Netherlands	3	2	1	0	4	1	+3	5	Advance to knockout stage
2	Germany	3	1	1	1	4	4	0	3	Advance to knockout stage
3	Scotland	3	1	0	2	3	3	0	2	
4	CIS	3	0	2	1	1	4	−3	2	

Source: UEFA
12 June 1992
17:15

Netherlands	1–0	Scotland
Bergkamp 75'	Report

Ullevi, Gothenburg
Attendance: 35,720
Referee: Bo Karlsson (Sweden)
12 June 1992
20:15

CIS	1–1	Germany
Dobrovolski 64' (pen.)	Report	Häßler 90'

Idrottsparken, Norrköping
Attendance: 17,410
Referee: Gérard Biguet (France)

15 June 1992
17:15

Scotland	0–2	Germany
	Report	Riedle 29'; Effenberg 47'

Idrottsparken, Norrköping
Attendance: 17,638
Referee: Guy Goethals (Belgium)
15 June 1992
20:15

Netherlands	0–0	CIS
	Report

Ullevi, Gothenburg
Attendance: 34,440
Referee: Peter Mikkelsen (Denmark)

18 June 1992
20:15

Netherlands	3–1	Germany
Rijkaard 4'; Witschge 15'; Bergkamp 72'	Report	Klinsmann 53'

Ullevi, Gothenburg
Attendance: 37,725
Referee: Pierluigi Pairetto (Italy)
18 June 1992
20:15

Scotland	3–0	CIS
McStay 7'; McClair 16'; McAllister 84' (pen.)	Report

Idrottsparken, Norrköping
Attendance: 14,660
Referee: Kurt Röthlisberger (Switzerland)

== Knockout stage ==
In the knockout phase, extra time and a penalty shoot-out were used to decide the winner if necessary. As with every tournament after UEFA Euro 1980, there was no third place play-off.

All times are local, CEST (UTC+2).

=== Bracket ===
Semi-finals
22 June – Gothenburg
Netherlands	2 (4)
Denmark (p)	2 (5)
21 June – Solna
Sweden	2
Germany	3

Final
26 June – Gothenburg
Denmark	2
Germany	0

=== Semi-finals ===
21 June 1992
20:15

Sweden	2–3	Germany
Brolin 64' (pen.); K. Andersson 89'	Report	Häßler 11'; Riedle 59', 88'

Råsunda Stadium, Solna
Attendance: 28,827
Referee: Tullio Lanese (Italy)

22 June 1992
20:15

Netherlands	2–2 (a.e.t.)	Denmark
Bergkamp 23'; Rijkaard 86'	Report	Larsen 5', 33'
Penalties
Koeman (penalty scored); Van Basten (penalty missed); Bergkamp (penalty scored); Rijkaard (penalty scored); Witschge (penalty scored)	4–5	(penalty scored) Larsen; (penalty scored) Povlsen; (penalty scored) Elstrup; (penalty scored) Vilfort; (penalty scored) Christofte

Ullevi, Gothenburg
Attendance: 37,450
Referee: Emilio Soriano Aladrén (Spain)

=== Final ===
26 June 1992
20:15

Denmark	2–0	Germany
Jensen 18'; Vilfort 78'	Report

Ullevi, Gothenburg
Attendance: 37,800
Referee: Bruno Galler (Switzerland)

== Statistics ==
=== Goalscorers ===
There were 32 goals scored in 15 matches, for an average of 2.13 goals per match.

3 goals

- (Denmark) Henrik Larsen
- (Germany) Karl-Heinz Riedle
- (Netherlands) Dennis Bergkamp
- (Sweden) Tomas Brolin

2 goals

- (France) Jean-Pierre Papin
- (Germany) Thomas Häßler
- (Netherlands) Frank Rijkaard
- (Sweden) Jan Eriksson

1 goal

- (Commonwealth of Independent States) Igor Dobrovolski
- (Denmark) Lars Elstrup
- (Denmark) John Jensen
- (Denmark) Kim Vilfort
- (England) David Platt
- (Germany) Stefan Effenberg
- (Germany) Jürgen Klinsmann
- (Netherlands) Rob Witschge
- (Scotland) Gary McAllister
- (Scotland) Brian McClair
- (Scotland) Paul McStay
- (Sweden) Kennet Andersson

Source: UEFA

=== Awards ===
UEFA Team of the Tournament

Goalkeeper	Defenders	Midfielders	Forwards
(Denmark) Peter Schmeichel	(France) Jocelyn Angloma (France) Laurent Blanc (Germany) Andreas Brehme (Germany) Jürgen Kohler	(Denmark) Brian Laudrup (Germany) Stefan Effenberg (Germany) Thomas Häßler (Netherlands) Ruud Gullit	(Netherlands) Dennis Bergkamp (Netherlands) Marco van Basten

=== Discipline ===
Player	Offence(s)	Suspension(s)
(Commonwealth of Independent States) Akhrik Tsveiba	(yellow card) in Group B vs Germany (matchday 1; 12 June); (yellow card) in Group B vs Netherlands (matchday 2; 15 June)	Group B vs Scotland (matchday 3; 18 June)
(Sweden) Patrik Andersson	(yellow card) in Group A vs Denmark (matchday 2; 14 June); (yellow card) in Group A vs England (matchday 3; 17 June)	Semi-finals vs Germany (21 June)
(Sweden) Stefan Schwarz	(yellow card) in Group A vs France (matchday 1; 10 June); (yellow card) in Group A vs England (matchday 3; 17 June)	Semi-finals vs Germany (21 June)

== Marketing ==
=== Slogan and theme song ===
Small is Beautiful was the official slogan of the contest. The official anthem of the tournament was "More Than a Game", performed by Towe Jaarnek and Peter Jöback.

=== Logo and identity ===
It was the last tournament to use the UEFA plus flag logo, and before the tournament was known as "Euro" (it is known as "Euro 1992" only retrospectively). It was also the first major football competition in which the players had their names printed on their backs, around the time that it was becoming a trend in club football across Europe.

=== Mascot ===
The official mascot of the competition was a rabbit named Rabbit, dressed in a Swedish football jersey, as well as head and wristbands.

=== Sponsorship ===
Global sponsors	Swedish sponsors
Adidas; Canon; Carlsberg; Coca-Cola; Disney; Fujifilm; General Motors; Intel; JVC; MasterCard; McDonald's; Opel; Philips; Ruhrgas; Sensodyne; Unicef	Föreningssparbanken; Saab; SAS; SJ; Swebus; Televerket
