= Scotland at the FIFA World Cup =

International football delegation

The Scotland national football team has appeared nine times at the FIFA World Cup, including five consecutive tournaments from 1974 to 1990. The team has never advanced beyond the first round of the finals competition. They have missed out on progressing to the second round three times on goal difference: in 1974, when Brazil edged them out; in 1978, when the Netherlands progressed; and in 1982, when the Soviets qualified. Although never qualifying for the next round, they have still caused some big upsets, for example their 3–2 win over the Netherlands in 1978. A 4–2 victory against Denmark clinched a spot at the 2026 FIFA World Cup, which was their first appearance in the finals since 1998.

== Background ==
The Scottish Football Association (SFA) is the second oldest in the world; it was founded in 1873, the year after the first official international match was played between Scotland and England at Hamilton Crescent, Glasgow.

The FIFA World Cup is an international association football competition contested by the men's national teams of the members of the Fédération Internationale de Football Association (FIFA), the sport's global governing body. The competition has been held every four years since the first tournament in 1930, except in 1942 and 1946, due to World War II.

The World Cup consists of two parts, the qualification phase and the final phase (officially called the World Cup Finals). The qualification phase, which currently take place over the three years preceding the Finals, is used to determine which teams qualify for the Finals. The current format of the Finals involves 48 teams competing at venues within the host nation (or nations) over a period of about a month. The World Cup Finals is the most widely viewed sporting event in the world, with an estimated 715.1 million people watching the 2006 tournament final.

== History ==
=== 1930s ===
Scotland did not compete in the first three World Cup competitions, in 1930, 1934 and 1938. Because of a dispute with FIFA over "broken-time" payments to players, the SFA – along with the football associations of England, Ireland and Wales – withdrew from FIFA in 1928, and did not rejoin as a permanent member until 1946.

=== 1950s ===
The readmission of the Scottish Football Association to FIFA in 1946 meant that Scotland were now eligible to enter the 1950 FIFA World Cup. FIFA advised that places would be awarded to the top two teams in the 1949–50 British Home Championship, but the SFA announced that Scotland would attend the finals only if Scotland won the competition. Scotland won their first two matches, but a 1–0 home defeat by England meant that the Scots finished as runners-up. The SFA stood by this proclamation, despite pleas to the contrary by the Scotland players, supported by England captain Billy Wright and the other England players. Sportswriter Brian Glanville later described the SFA as showing "baffling insularity and pique" in their refusal to send a team to the World Cup.

The same qualification rules as in 1950 were in place for the 1954 FIFA World Cup, with the 1953–54 British Home Championship acting as a qualifying group. Scotland again finished second, but this time the SFA allowed a team to participate in the Finals, held in Switzerland. To quote the SFA website, "The preparation was atrocious". The SFA only sent 13 players to the finals, even though FIFA allowed 22-man squads at the tournament. Despite this self-imposed hardship in terms of players, the SFA dignitaries travelled in numbers, accompanied with their wives. Scotland lost 1–0 against Austria in their first game in the finals. After falling out with the SFA, probably due to the poor preparation of the team, manager Andy Beattie resigned hours before the game against Uruguay. Uruguay were reigning champions and had never before lost a game at the World Cup finals. The gulf in class was exposed in horrific fashion as Uruguay won 7–0.

Scotland qualified for the 1958 FIFA World Cup, finishing ahead of Spain. Manchester United manager Matt Busby had been due to manage the Scotland team at the World Cup, but the severe injuries he suffered in the Munich air disaster in February meant that trainer Dawson Walker took charge of the team instead. In their first match at the finals Scotland achieved a creditable draw against Yugoslavia. Players Archie Robertson and Tommy Docherty were sent to watch next opponents Paraguay and they reported back that Paraguay was a "rough, fit and good" team. Walker chose to ignore this advice and left out some of his combative players, including Docherty, and Scotland lost 3–2. They exited the competition after also losing to France.

=== 1960s ===
Scotland failed to qualify for another World Cup in the next 16 years. In the 1962 competition, a "skilful but fragile" team finished joint-top of UEFA qualification group 8 with Czechoslovakia. This meant that the teams had to play-off in a neutral venue for the qualification place, which the Czechs won 4–2 after extra time.

Jock Stein was appointed manager on a part-time basis ahead of 1966 FIFA World Cup qualification. Scotland were drawn with Italy, Poland and Finland in UEFA qualification group 8. Scotland got off to a good start with two wins against Finland and a draw in Poland, but then conceded two late goals to lose 2–1 to Poland at home. A 1–0 home win against Italy kept hopes alive going into the final game, where Scotland either needed to win in Italy to qualify or draw to force another play-off. Several first choice players withdrew due to injury; Scotland lost 3–0 and failed to qualify. Stein relinquished the Scotland job after this defeat to concentrate on his full-time role with Celtic.

=== 1970s ===
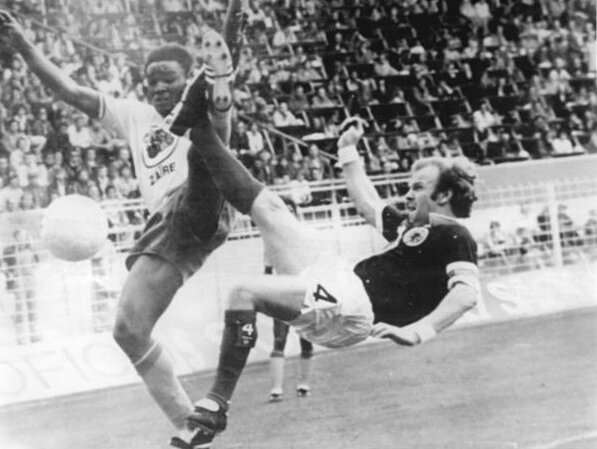
Billy Bremner (right) playing for Scotland at the Westfalenstadion in the 1974 FIFA World Cup

Now managed by Bobby Brown, Scotland were drawn with West Germany, Austria and Cyprus in their 1970 qualification group. Scotland started well, beating Austria at home and scoring 13 goals in the two matches against Cyprus. A draw at home with West Germany meant that Scotland needed to avoid defeat in the return game to retain any hope of qualification. Scotland scored first in Hamburg, and then equalised midway through the second half, but succumbed to a 3–2 defeat.

Willie Ormond was appointed Scotland manager in 1973. Ormond lost his first match in charge 5–0 to England, but recovered to steer Scotland to the 1974 World Cup finals in West Germany. Scotland then achieved their most impressive performance at a World Cup tournament, as the team was unbeaten but failed to progress beyond the group stages on goal difference. After beating Zaire, they drew with both Brazil and Yugoslavia, and went out because they had beaten Zaire by the smallest margin. This performance has been assessed as a "gallant failure", but the choice to retain possession instead of pressing for more goals against Zaire has been criticised.

Scotland appointed Ally MacLeod as manager in 1977. Scotland qualified for the 1978 FIFA World Cup with victories over Czechoslovakia and Wales. During the build-up to the tournament, MacLeod fuelled the hopes of the nation by stating that Scotland would come home from Argentina with a medal. As the squad left for the finals, they were given an enthusiastic send off as they were paraded around a packed Hampden Park. Thousands more fans lined the route to Prestwick Airport as the team set off for South America. This enthusiasm was not just generated internally, as respected coaches such as Rinus Michels and Miljan Miljanić rated Scotland amongst the favourites to win the competition. The Royal Mail commissioned designs of commemorative stamps that would have been circulated if Scotland had won the World Cup.

Scotland's first game was against Peru in Córdoba. Two spectacular goals by Teófilo Cubillas meant that the result was a 3–1 loss. The second game was a very disappointing 1–1 draw against Iran. Scotland had not even scouted Iran. The disconsolate mood of the nation was reflected by footage of Ally MacLeod in the dugout with his head in his hands. MacLeod had made strange selection choices, picking inexperienced full-backs and retaining the out-of-form Bruce Rioch and Don Masson.

After taking a single point from their opening two games, Scotland had to defeat the Netherlands by three clear goals to progress. Despite the Dutch taking the lead, Scotland fought back to win 3–2 with a goal from Kenny Dalglish and two from Archie Gemmill, the second of which is considered one of the greatest World Cup goals ever; Gemmill beat three Dutch defenders before lifting the ball over goalkeeper Jan Jongbloed into the net. The victory was not sufficient to secure a place in the second round, however, as Scotland were eliminated on goal difference for the second successive World Cup. This performance against strong opponents only heightened the frustration at the poor results earlier in the competition. MacLeod initially retained his position, but resigned later that year.

=== 1980s ===
Jock Stein, who had won nine consecutive Scottish league titles and the European Cup as manager of Celtic, was appointed Scotland manager in 1978. After failing to qualify for the 1980 European Championship, Scotland qualified for the 1982 FIFA World Cup from a tough group including Sweden, Portugal, Israel and Northern Ireland, losing just one match in the process. They were then drawn in a "Group of death" with New Zealand, Brazil and the Soviet Union. Scotland beat New Zealand by 5–2 in their first game, but then lost 4–1 to a Brazil team containing Socrates, Zico, Eder and Falcão. Scotland were again eliminated on goal difference, after a 2–2 draw with the Soviet Union. This match is best remembered for defenders Alan Hansen and Willie Miller colliding while chasing a long ball, which allowed the Soviets to run through and score.

Scotland qualified for the 1986 FIFA World Cup, their fourth in succession, in traumatic circumstances. The squad went into their last qualification match against Wales needing a point to progress to a qualifying playoff against Australia. With only nine minutes remaining and Wales leading 1–0, Scotland were awarded a penalty kick, which was calmly scored by Davie Cooper. The 1–1 draw meant that Scotland progressed, but as the players and fans celebrated, national coach Jock Stein suffered a heart attack and died shortly afterwards. His assistant Alex Ferguson took over. Scotland qualified by winning 2–0 against Australia in a two-leg playoff, but were again drawn into a group of death, this time with Uruguay, Denmark and West Germany. Scotland were eliminated from the tournament with just one point from their three matches, a goalless draw with Uruguay.

=== 1990s ===
Now managed by Andy Roxburgh, Scotland qualified for their fifth consecutive World Cup in 1990 by finishing second in their qualifying group behind Yugoslavia and ahead of France. Drawn in a group with Costa Rica, Sweden, and Brazil, the Scots lost 1–0 to Costa Rica in their opening match. While they recovered to beat Sweden 2–1 in their second game, they lost to Brazil in their third match 1–0 (goalkeeper Jim Leighton fumbled a shot that allowed Brazil to score the only goal in the closing minutes) and were once again eliminated after the first round.

Scotland failed to qualify for the 1994 FIFA World Cup; the team finished fourth in their qualifying group behind Italy, Switzerland and Portugal. When it became clear that Scotland could not qualify, Andy Roxburgh resigned from his position as team manager.

Craig Brown took over and guided Scotland to the 1998 FIFA World Cup, finishing behind Austria in the group but qualifying as the best European runners-up. Scotland were drawn against Brazil for a fourth time, and faced the holders in the opening game of the tournament. John Collins scored from the penalty spot to level the score at 1–1, but a Tom Boyd own goal led to a 2–1 defeat. Scotland drew their next game 1–1 with Norway in Bordeaux, but the final match against Morocco ended in a 3–0 loss.

=== 2000s ===
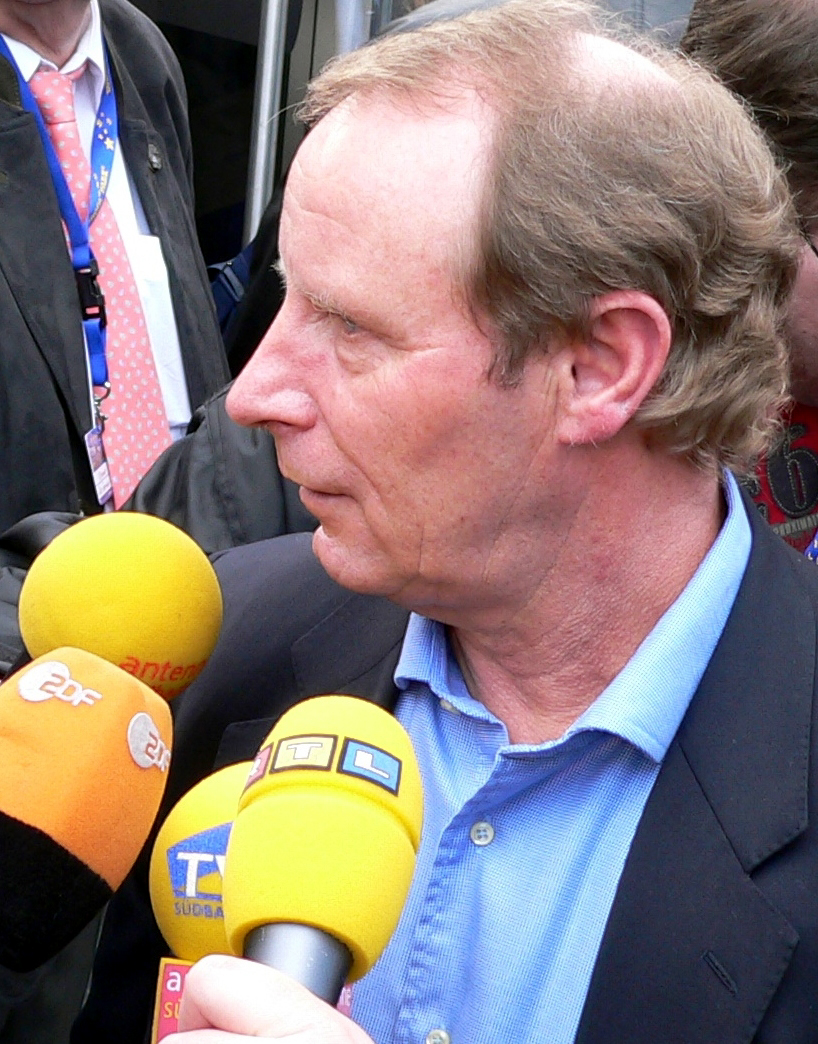
Berti Vogts, the only foreigner to coach Scotland to date

Scotland failed to qualify for the 2002 FIFA World Cup, finishing third in their qualifying group behind Croatia and Belgium. Craig Brown resigned after the final qualifying match.

The SFA then appointed the first foreign national team manager, former Germany coach Berti Vogts. Poor results in friendly matches and a bad start to 2006 FIFA World Cup qualification caused the team to drop to a record low of 77th in the FIFA World Rankings. Vogts announced his resignation in 2004, blaming the hostile media for his departure. Walter Smith was brought in to replace Vogts and some improved results followed, but the team finished third in their group behind Italy and Norway and failed to qualify.

=== 2010s ===
After a narrow failure to qualify for UEFA Euro 2008, George Burley was hired as the new manager. He was criticised by the media after the team lost their first 2010 FIFA World Cup qualification match against Macedonia. After Scotland lost their fourth match 3–0 to the Netherlands, captain Barry Ferguson and goalkeeper Allan McGregor were excluded from the starting lineup for the following match against Iceland due to a "breach of discipline". Despite winning 2–1 against Iceland, Scotland suffered a terrible 4–0 defeat by Norway in the next qualifier, and effectively needed to win their final two games to have a realistic chance of making the qualifying play-offs. They defeated Macedonia 2–0, but were eliminated by a 1–0 loss to the Netherlands in the last game. Burley was sacked after a 3–0 friendly defeat by Wales soon afterwards.

Craig Levein replaced Burley, but he left following a poor start to 2014 FIFA World Cup qualification, having taken just two points from four games. Gordon Strachan was appointed manager in January 2013, but defeats in his first two competitive matches meant that Scotland were the first UEFA team to be mathematically eliminated from the 2014 World Cup. Scotland finished by winning three of their last four matches, including two victories against Croatia, placing fourth in the group when fifth or sixth looked likely (they thus maintained a record of never having finished in the lowest two places of any World Cup qualification group).

In qualification for the 2018 FIFA World Cup, Scotland were drawn in the same group as England, facing their rivals in a competitive fixture for the first time since 1999. On 11 November 2016, England won 3–0 at Wembley; the return match in June 2017 saw Leigh Griffiths score two late free-kicks to give Scotland a 2–1 lead, but Harry Kane scored in added time to force a 2–2 draw. A draw away to Slovenia in the final game of the group ended Scottish hopes of a play-off position, and Strachan subsequently left his position by mutual consent.

=== 2020s ===
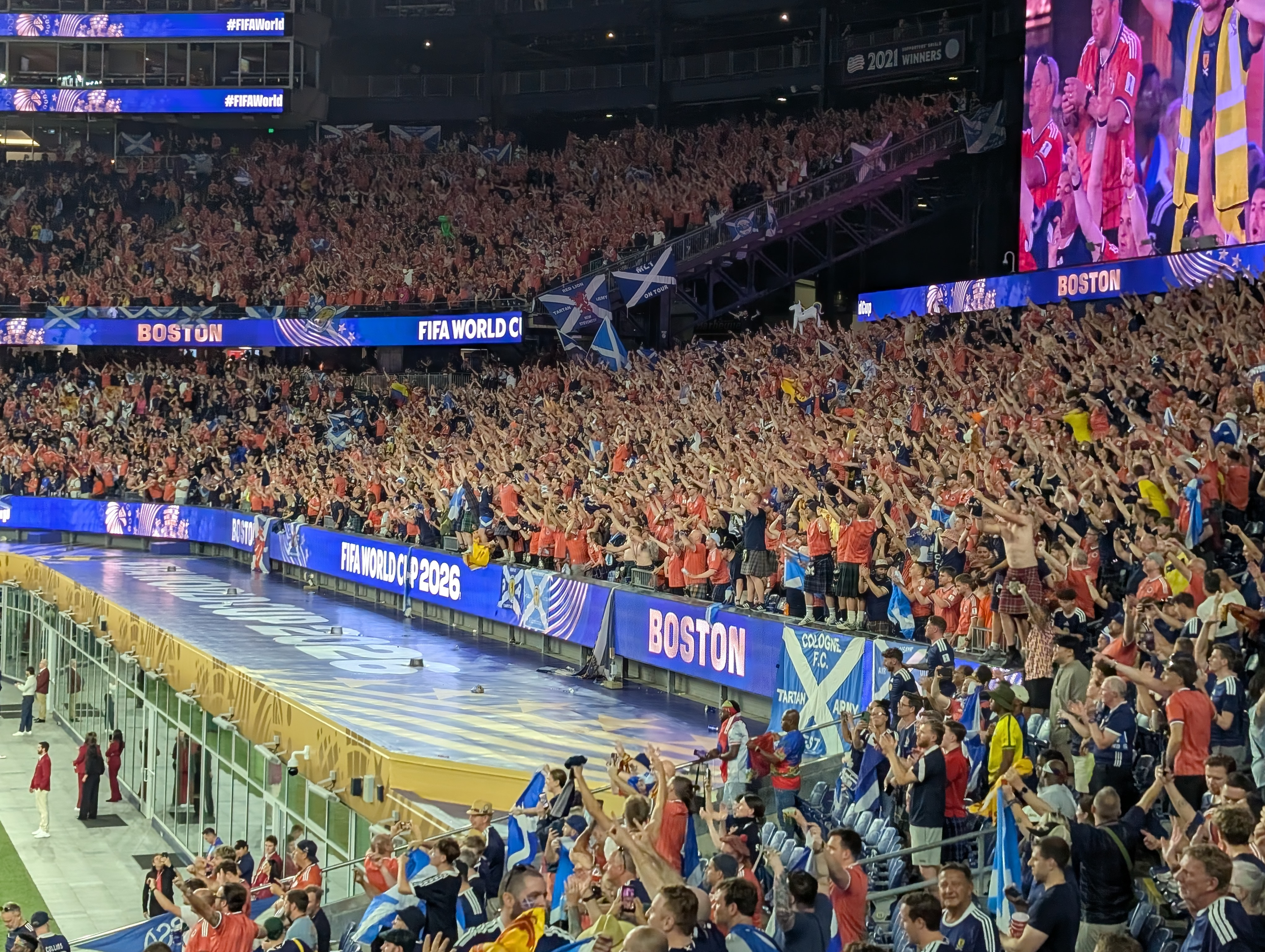
Scottish fans gathered at the 2026 FIFA World Cup at Gillette Stadium outside of Boston.

Steve Clarke was appointed Scotland manager in May 2019. After qualifying for UEFA Euro 2020, their first major tournament since the 1998 World Cup, Scotland finished second in Group F of 2022 FIFA World Cup qualification. This progressed the team into the play-offs, where they lost 3–1 to Ukraine in a semi-final at Hampden.

In their 2026 World Cup qualification group Scotland drew with Denmark away, beat Belarus twice and Greece at home. A defeat in Greece endangered their chances of winning automatic qualification, but Denmark being held to a draw by Belarus kept their hopes alive. Scotland then beat Denmark 4–2 at home in the last match of the section, clinching their ninth World Cup finals appearance, and their first since 1998.

In Scotland's opening game in group C of the 2026 FIFA World Cup on 12 June 2026, they won 1-0 against Haiti to record a first win at a World Cup finals's since the win against Sweden in 1990. The only goal of the game came from a deflected shot by John McGinn in the 28th minute.

== Statistics ==
=== Tournament summary ===
Year	FIFA World Cup record								Qualification record						
Year	Round	Pld	W	D	L	GF	GA	Squad	Pld	W	D	L	GF	GA	Position
1930	Not a FIFA Member								Not a FIFA Member						
1934	Not a FIFA Member								Not a FIFA Member						
1938	Not a FIFA Member								Not a FIFA Member						
1950	Qualified but withdrew								3	2	0	1	10	3	2nd / 4
1954	Group stage	2	0	0	2	0	8	Squad	3	1	1	1	8	8	2nd / 4
1958	Group stage	3	0	1	2	4	6	Squad	4	3	0	1	10	9	1st / 3
1962	Did not qualify								5	3	0	2	12	11	2nd / 3
1966	Did not qualify								6	3	1	2	8	8	2nd / 4
1970	Did not qualify								6	3	1	2	18	7	2nd / 4
1974	Group stage	3	1	2	0	3	1	Squad	4	3	0	1	8	3	1st / 3
1978	Group stage	3	1	1	1	5	6	Squad	4	3	0	1	6	3	1st / 3
1982	Group stage	3	1	1	1	8	8	Squad	8	4	3	1	9	4	1st / 5
1986	Group stage	3	0	1	2	1	3	Squad	8	4	2	2	10	4	2nd / 4
1990	Group stage	3	1	0	2	2	3	Squad	8	4	2	2	12	12	2nd / 5
1994	Did not qualify								10	4	3	3	14	13	4th / 6
1998	Group stage	3	0	1	2	2	6	Squad	10	7	2	1	15	3	2nd / 6
2002	Did not qualify								8	4	3	1	12	6	3rd / 5
2006	Did not qualify								10	3	4	3	9	7	3rd / 6
2010	Did not qualify								8	3	1	4	6	11	3rd / 5
2014	Did not qualify								10	3	2	5	8	12	4th / 6
2018	Did not qualify								10	5	3	2	17	12	3rd / 6
2022	Did not qualify								11	7	2	2	18	10	2nd / 6
2026	Group stage	3	1	0	2	1	4	Squad	6	4	1	1	13	7	1st / 4
2030	To be determined								To be determined						
2034	To be determined								To be determined						
Total	9/23	26	5	7	14	26	45	—	142	73	31	38	223	153	—

=== Matches played ===
World Cup (manager)	Round	Opponent	Score	Result	Venue	Scotland scorers
1954 (Beattie)	Group stage	Austria	0–1	L	Zürich	—
1954 (Beattie)	Group stage	Uruguay	0–7	L	Basel	—
1958 (Walker)	Group stage	Yugoslavia	1–1	D	Västerås	Murray
1958 (Walker)	Group stage	Paraguay	2–3	L	Norrköping	Mudie, Collins
1958 (Walker)	Group stage	France	1–2	L	Örebro	Baird
1974 (Ormond)	Group stage	Zaire	2–0	W	Dortmund	Lorimer, Jordan
1974 (Ormond)	Group stage	Brazil	0–0	D	Frankfurt	—
1974 (Ormond)	Group stage	Yugoslavia	1–1	D	Frankfurt	Jordan
1978 (MacLeod)	Group stage	Peru	1–3	L	Córdoba	Jordan
1978 (MacLeod)	Group stage	Iran	1–1	D	Córdoba	Eskandarian (o.g.)
1978 (MacLeod)	Group stage	Netherlands	3–2	W	Mendoza	Dalglish, Gemmill (2)
1982 (Stein)	Group stage	New Zealand	5–2	W	Málaga	Dalglish, Wark (2), Robertson, Archibald
1982 (Stein)	Group stage	Brazil	1–4	L	Seville	Narey
1982 (Stein)	Group stage	Soviet Union	2–2	D	Málaga	Jordan, Souness
1986 (Ferguson)	Group stage	Denmark	0–1	L	Nezahualcóyotl	—
1986 (Ferguson)	Group stage	West Germany	1–2	L	Querétaro	Strachan
1986 (Ferguson)	Group stage	Uruguay	0–0	D	Nezahualcóyotl	—
1990 (Roxburgh)	Group stage	Costa Rica	0–1	L	Genoa	—
1990 (Roxburgh)	Group stage	Sweden	2–1	W	Genoa	McCall, Johnston
1990 (Roxburgh)	Group stage	Brazil	0–1	L	Turin	—
1998 (Brown)	Group stage	Brazil	1–2	L	Saint-Denis	Collins
1998 (Brown)	Group stage	Norway	1–1	D	Bordeaux	Burley
1998 (Brown)	Group stage	Morocco	0–3	L	Saint-Étienne	—
2026 (Clarke)	Group stage	Haiti	1–0	W	Foxborough	McGinn
2026 (Clarke)	Group stage	Morocco	0–1	L	Foxborough	—
2026 (Clarke)	Group stage	Brazil	0–3	L	Miami Gardens	—

=== Head to head records ===
Team	Pld	W	D	L	GF	GA	GD	WPCT
Austria	1	0	0	1	0	1	−1	0.00
Brazil	5	0	1	4	2	10	−8	0.00
Costa Rica	1	0	0	1	0	1	−1	0.00
Denmark	1	0	0	1	0	1	−1	0.00
France	1	0	0	1	1	2	−1	0.00
Haiti	1	1	0	0	1	0	+1	100.00
Iran	1	0	1	0	1	1	0	0.00
Morocco	2	0	0	2	0	4	−4	0.00
Netherlands	1	1	0	0	3	2	+1	100.00
New Zealand	1	1	0	0	5	2	+3	100.00
Norway	1	0	1	0	1	1	0	0.00
Paraguay	1	0	0	1	2	3	−1	0.00
Peru	1	0	0	1	1	3	−2	0.00
Soviet Union	1	0	1	0	2	2	0	0.00
Sweden	1	1	0	0	2	1	+1	100.00
Uruguay	2	0	1	1	0	7	−7	0.00
West Germany	1	0	0	1	1	2	−1	0.00
Yugoslavia	2	0	2	0	2	2	0	0.00
Zaire	1	1	0	0	2	0	+2	100.00
Total	26	5	7	14	26	45	−19	19.23

Source: Results

==== Qualifying ====
Qualifying head-to-head
Opponent	Pld	W	D	L	GF	GA	%W	%D	%L
Australia	2	1	1	0	2	0	50	50	0
Austria	6	3	2	1	7	5	50	33.33	16.67
Belarus	6	4	1	1	9	3	66.67	16.67	16.67
Belgium	4	0	1	3	2	8	0	25	75
Croatia	4	2	2	0	4	1	50	50	0
Cyprus	4	4	0	0	18	3	100	0	0
Czechoslovakia	7	3	0	4	10	15	42.86	0	57.14
Denmark	6	4	1	1	12	5	66.67	16.67	16.67
England	4	0	1	3	4	10	0	25	75
Estonia	4	3	1	0	8	1	75	25	0
Faroe Islands	2	2	0	0	5	0	100	0	0
Finland	2	2	0	0	5	2	100	0	0
France	2	1	0	1	2	3	50	0	50
Greece	2	1	0	1	5	4	50	0	50
Iceland	4	4	0	0	8	2	100	0	0
Ireland	1	1	0	0	8	2	100	0	0
Israel	4	3	1	0	8	4	75	25	0
Italy	6	1	2	3	3	9	16.67	33.33	50
Latvia	4	4	0	0	7	1	100	0	0
Lithuania	2	1	1	0	4	1	50	50	0
North Macedonia	4	1	2	1	5	3	25	50	25
Malta	4	4	0	0	12	1	100	0	0
Moldova	4	3	1	0	6	1	75	25	0
Netherlands	2	0	0	2	0	4	0	0	100
Northern Ireland	3	1	2	0	4	2	33.33	66.67	0
Norway	6	1	2	3	4	9	16.67	33.33	50
Poland	2	0	1	1	2	3	0	50	50
Portugal	4	0	2	2	1	7	0	50	50
Republic of Ireland	2	2	0	0	7	1	100	0	0
San Marino	2	2	0	0	6	0	100	0	0
Serbia	2	0	1	1	0	2	0	50	50
Slovakia	2	1	0	1	1	3	50	0	50
Slovenia	4	2	2	0	6	2	50	50	0
Spain	4	2	0	2	8	8	50	0	50
Sweden	4	3	0	1	5	2	75	0	25
Switzerland	4	2	1	1	7	7	50	25	25
Ukraine	0	0	0	1	1	3	0	0	100
Wales	8	3	2	3	4	1	37.5	25	37.5
West Germany	2	0	1	1	3	4	0	50	50
Yugoslavia	2	0	1	1	2	4	0	50	50

== Player records ==
=== Most appearances ===
Rank	Player	Matches	World Cups
1	Jim Leighton	9	1986, 1990 and 1998
2	Kenny Dalglish	8	1974, 1978 and 1982
3	Joe Jordan	7	1974, 1978 and 1982
4	Alan Rough	6	1978 and 1982
4	Graeme Souness	6	1978, 1982 and 1986
4	Gordon Strachan	6	1982 and 1986
4	Roy Aitken	6	1986 and 1990
8	Martin Buchan	5	1974 and 1978
8	Danny McGrain	5	1974 and 1982
8	Willie Miller	5	1982 and 1986
8	David Narey	5	1982 and 1986
8	Alex McLeish	5	1982, 1986 and 1990
8	Maurice Malpas	5	1986 and 1990

=== Top goalscorers ===
After Scotland failed to score a single goal at the 1954 edition, Jimmy Murray made history on June 8, 1958 against Yugoslavia in Västerås by scoring his country's first-ever FIFA World Cup goal.

Rank	Player	Goals	World Cups
1	Joe Jordan	4	1974 (2), 1978 (1) and 1982 (1)
2	Archie Gemmill	2	1978
2	Kenny Dalglish	2	1978 and 1982
2	John Wark	2	1982
5	Thirteen players	1	—

== See also ==
- Scotland at the UEFA European Championship
