= Scotland at the UEFA European Championship =

International football delegation

The UEFA European Championship is the main football competition of the men's national football teams governed by UEFA (the Union of European Football Associations). Held every four years since 1960, in the even-numbered year between World Cup tournaments, it was originally called the UEFA European Nations' Cup, changing to the current name in 1968. Starting with the 1996 tournament, specific championships are often referred to in the form “Euro XXXX”. Prior to entering the tournament all teams other than the host nations (which qualify automatically) compete in a qualifying process.

Scotland have participated in four UEFA European Championship finals: the 1992, 1996, 2020 (played in 2021 due to the COVID-19 pandemic) and 2024 editions. They have played twelve matches, winning two, drawing three and losing seven. They have scored seven goals and conceded seventeen, failing to advance past the group stage so far.

== History ==
=== 1960s ===
Scotland first participated in the European Championships in 1968, after not entering the first two tournaments. The 1966–67 and 1967–68 editions of the British Home Championship formed the results of their qualifying group, with Scotland finishing a point behind group winners England. Scotland's first qualifying match was a 1–1 draw in Cardiff against Wales on 22 October 1966, with Denis Law scoring an 86th-minute equaliser for the Scots. Scotland's first win came against Northern Ireland on 16 November 1966 at Hampden Park - they won 2–1. On 15 April 1967, Scotland became the first side to defeat England since their World Cup victory - a 3–2 win at Wembley gave Scotland the 1966–67 British Home Championship crown. Northern Ireland defeated Scotland 1–0 in Belfast on 21 October 1967, before a 3–2 victory against the Welsh on 22 November 1967. A 1–1 draw with England, on 24 February 1968, wasn't enough for Scotland to qualify from the group.

=== 1970s ===
Scotland were drawn alongside Belgium, Denmark and Portugal in the qualification phase of UEFA Euro 1972. Scotland won all their home matches, but lost all their away games to finish third in the group. A 1–0 defeat to Denmark in Copenhagen on 9 June 1971 saw Scotland eliminated from qualifying. Belgium won the group to progress to the play-offs.

UEFA Euro 1976 qualifying saw Scotland face Denmark, Romania and Spain. Scotland lost their opening match 2–1 to the Spaniards at Hampden, before drawing 1–1 in Valencia. Gordon McQueen scored a late equaliser to win Scotland a point away in Romania, before Joe Harper's goal saw Scotland beat Denmark 1–0 away from home. Scotland won the reverse fixture 3–1. Scotland's final match was at home to Romania, with Scotland requiring a two-goal win to win the group and qualify for the play-offs. Scotland took the lead through a Bruce Rioch goal, but Romania levelled the match with fifteen minutes to go to send Scotland out.

=== 1980s ===
Scotland's qualifying group for Euro 1980 featured Austria, Belgium, Norway and Portugal. Defeats against Austria and Portugal in their opening three matches removed any chance of qualification for Scotland, with two wins over Norway and a 4–1 victory over Portugal at Hampden being the only victories in a disappointing qualifying campaign for the Scots, who finished fourth.

Belgium, East Germany and Switzerland were Scotland's opponents in qualifying for UEFA Euro 1984. An opening game win over East Germany was the only victory of the campaign for the Scots, with home draws against Belgium and Switzerland being the only other points obtained in the campaign. Scotland lost all of their away matches to finish bottom of the group.

Scotland faced Belgium, Bulgaria, Luxembourg and the Republic of Ireland in qualifying for UEFA Euro 1988. Two 0–0 draws against Bulgaria and the Republic of Ireland was followed up with a 3–0 victory over minnows Luxembourg. Successive defeats against the Republic of Ireland (1–0) and Belgium (4–1) saw qualification fall out of reach, once again. Victories over Belgium (2–0) and Bulgaria (1–0) followed, before a disappointing 0–0 draw over Luxembourg, who obtained their first and only point of the campaign. The win against Bulgaria, who had only needed to draw the match to qualify, meant that Ireland qualified for their first major tournament.

=== 1990s ===
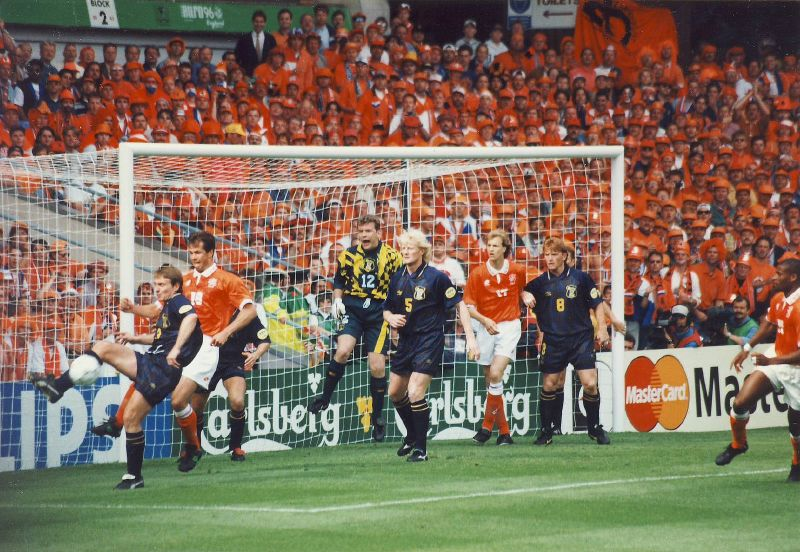
Scotland played out a goalless draw against the Netherlands during Euro 1996 at Villa Park, Birmingham

Under the guidance of manager Andy Roxburgh, Scotland qualified for the UEFA European Championship for the first time in 1992. Scotland were drawn into a qualifying group of Bulgaria, Romania, San Marino and Switzerland. A 1–0 defeat to Romania away from home left qualification dependent upon other results, but a 1–1 draw between Bulgaria and Romania in the final group match saw Scotland squeeze through as group winners by a single point. Scotland were drawn into a very difficult group, facing defending champions the Netherlands, the CIS (the successor of the Soviet Union team defeated in the 1988 final), and Germany, World Cup holders and semi-finalists in 1988. Despite competing well in defeats against the Netherlands and Germany and a fine 3–0 win against the CIS, the team was knocked out at the group stage.

After Scotland failed to qualify for the 1994 FIFA World Cup, Andy Roxburgh was replaced by Craig Brown as Scotland manager. Brown successfully guided Scotland to the 1996 European Championship tournament, in second place behind Russia, in a qualifying group also featuring Greece, Faroe Islands, Finland and San Marino. The first game at the tournament against the Netherlands ended 0–0, raising morale ahead of a much anticipated game against rivals England at Wembley Stadium. Gary McAllister missed a penalty kick and a goal by Paul Gascoigne led to a 2–0 defeat. Scotland recovered to beat Switzerland 1–0 with a goal by Ally McCoist. England taking a 4–0 lead in the other match briefly put both teams in a position to qualify, but a late goal for the Netherlands meant that Scotland were eliminated on goals scored. The Netherlands and Scotland both had four points and a goal difference of minus one.

=== 2000s ===
Scotland finished second in their qualifying group for UEFA Euro 2000. The Czech Republic won the group, after winning all their matches. Bosnia and Herzegovina, Estonia and Lithuania all finished seven points behind Scotland, with the Faroe Islands bringing up the rear. Scotland were the third best second placed team, which qualified them for the play-offs. They were drawn against England. On 13 November 1999, England won the first leg 2–0 at Hampden Park, with Paul Scholes scoring both goals. Four days later, Scotland won the return leg at Wembley. Don Hutchison scored the winner for Scotland in a 1–0 win, which wasn't enough to prevent England qualifying for Euro 2000.

Scotland, once again, finished second in their qualifying group in qualification for Euro 2004. This time Germany were the group winners, with Iceland, Lithuania and the Faroe Islands finishing behind Scotland. On 7 June 2003, Scotland drew 1–1 with the Germans at Hampden with Kenny Miller scoring the equaliser. The second-place finish saw Scotland progress to the play-offs, where they were drawn against the Netherlands. On 15 November 2003, Scotland won the first leg 1–0, via a James McFadden goal. However, the Dutch won 6–0, four days later, in Amsterdam to knock Scotland out of the competition.

Scotland faced Italy and France, who had contested the 2006 World Cup final, in their qualifying group for UEFA Euro 2008. A 6–0 victory over the Faroe Islands started the campaign strongly, before defeating Lithuania 2–1 in Kaunas. On 7 October 2006, Scotland moved to the top of their group with a surprise 1–0 victory over France at Hampden Park. Scotland were defeated 2–0 in Ukraine four days later to end Scotland's winning start to the campaign. On 24 March 2007, Scotland won 2–1 against Georgia with a late goal from Craig Beattie, before falling 2–0 to World Champions Italy in Bari. Despite the defeat Scotland were level on points at the top of the qualifying group with France and Ukraine; Italy were two points behind. Victories over the Faroe Islands and Lithuania followed, before another 1–0 victory against the French, this time in Paris. James McFadden scored the winning goal. A 3–1 victory over Ukraine on 13 October 2007 saw Scotland strengthen their position at the top of the group, but a 2–0 defeat to a youthful Georgia side saw the campaign turn. Scotland required a win over Italy in their final game to qualify for Euro 2008, but fell to a 2–1 defeat after a late Italian goal put the Scots out. Scotland finished their group in third place.

=== 2010s ===
Scotland finished third in their UEFA Euro 2012 qualifying group, behind World and European Champions Spain and the Czech Republic. On 3 September 2011, a stoppage time Czech penalty saw them steal a point from Hampden Park, which ultimately proved vital for Scotland's qualification chances. Scotland would have finished second in the group and reached the play-offs, with victory in that match.

UEFA Euro 2016 saw eight additional teams qualify for the finals than was previously the case. This meant that the top two from each qualifying group would qualify, with the third placed team entering the play-offs. Scotland's 1–0 defeat against Georgia was the pivotal game of the group. A stoppage time equaliser from Poland on 8 October saw Scotland eliminated. Scotland finished fourth, behind Germany, Poland and the Republic of Ireland.

=== 2020s ===
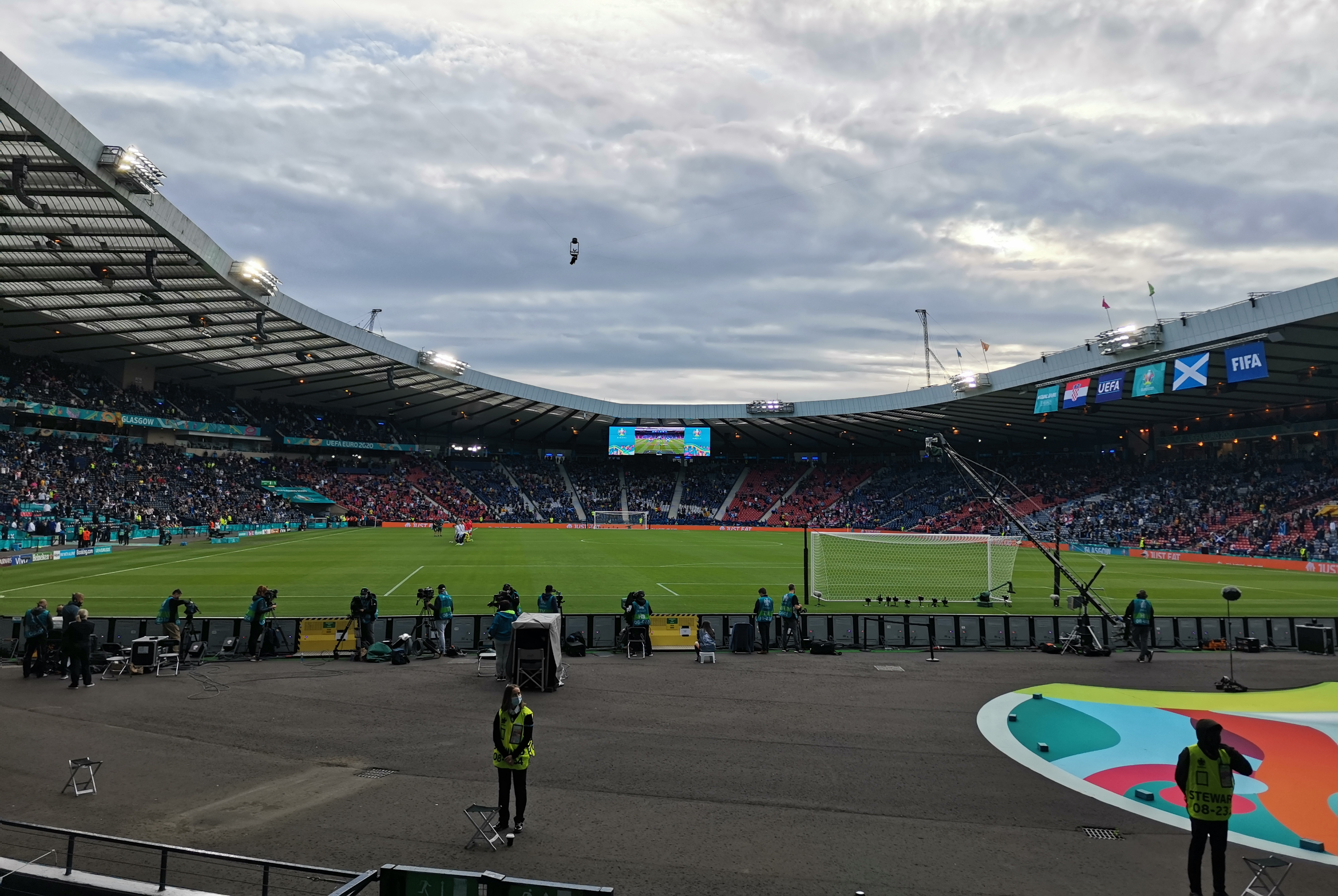
Teams line up for Scotland vs Croatia at UEFA Euro 2020, in front of a limited capacity at Hampden

Scotland hosted three group games and a last 16 match during UEFA Euro 2020, which was held at venues across Europe including Hampden Park, but was delayed for a year due to the COVID-19 pandemic. The team qualified for the tournament via the playoffs (based on finishing top of their mini-group in the 2018–19 UEFA Nations League – they were third, outside the automatic places, in the UEFA Euro 2020 qualifying group) by winning penalty shootouts against Israel and Serbia. Defeats by the Czech Republic and Croatia at Hampden, either side of a goalless draw with England at Wembley (all played with a limited number of spectators present due to COVID-19 restrictions) meant that Scotland finished bottom of Group D.

A record-breaking winning run at the start of Euro 2024 qualifying, of five consecutive matches, meant that Scotland qualified for Euro 2024 with two matches to spare.

== Statistics ==
=== Overall record ===
Year	UEFA European Championship record								Qualification record							
Year	Round	Pld	W	D	L	GF	GA	Squad	Pld	W	D	L	GF	GA	Position	
1960	Did not enter								Did not enter							
1964	Did not enter								Did not enter							
1968	Did not qualify								6	3	2	1	10	8	2nd / 4	
1972	Did not qualify								6	3	0	3	4	7	3rd / 4	
1976	Did not qualify								6	2	3	1	8	6	3rd / 4	
1980	Did not qualify								8	3	1	4	15	13	4th / 5	
1984	Did not qualify								6	1	2	3	8	10	4th / 4	
1988	Did not qualify								8	3	3	2	7	5	4th / 5	
1992	Group stage	3	1	0	2	3	3	Squad	8	4	3	1	14	7	1st / 5	
1996	Group stage	3	1	1	1	1	2	Squad	10	7	2	1	19	3	2nd / 6	
2000	Did not qualify								12	6	3	3	16	12	2nd / 6	
2004	Did not qualify								10	5	2	3	13	14	2nd / 5	
2008	Did not qualify								12	8	0	4	21	12	3rd / 7	
2012	Did not qualify								8	3	2	3	9	10	3rd / 5	
2016	Did not qualify								10	4	3	3	22	12	4th / 6	
2020	Group stage	3	0	1	2	1	5	Squad	12	5	2	5	17	20	3rd / 6	
2024	Group stage	3	0	1	2	2	7	Squad	8	5	2	1	17	8	2nd / 5	
2028	To be determined								To be determined							
2032	To be determined								To be determined							
Total	Group stage	4/17	12	2	3	7	7	17	—	—	130	62	30	38	200	147

=== Matches played ===
Year (manager)	Round	Opponent	Score	Result	Venue	Scotland scorers
1992 (Roxburgh)	Group stage	Netherlands	0–1	L	Gothenburg	—
1992 (Roxburgh)	Group stage	Germany	0–2	L	Norrköping	—
1992 (Roxburgh)	Group stage	CIS	3–0	W	Norrköping	Paul McStay, Brian McClair, Gary McAllister
1996 (Brown)	Group stage	Netherlands	0–0	D	Birmingham	—
1996 (Brown)	Group stage	England	0–2	L	London	—
1996 (Brown)	Group stage	Switzerland	1–0	W	Birmingham	Ally McCoist
2020 (held in 2021) (Clarke)	Group stage	Czech Republic	0–2	L	Glasgow	—
2020 (held in 2021) (Clarke)	Group stage	England	0–0	D	London	—
2020 (held in 2021) (Clarke)	Group stage	Croatia	1–3	L	Glasgow	Callum McGregor
2024 (Clarke)	Group stage	Germany	1–5	L	Munich	Antonio Rüdiger (o.g.)
2024 (Clarke)	Group stage	Switzerland	1–1	D	Cologne	Scott McTominay
2024 (Clarke)	Group stage	Hungary	0–1	L	Stuttgart	—

=== Head to head records ===
Team	Pld	W	D	L	GF	GA	GD	WPCT
CIS	1	1	0	0	3	0	+3	100.00
Croatia	1	0	0	1	1	3	−2	0.00
Czech Republic	1	0	0	1	0	2	−2	0.00
England	2	0	1	1	0	2	−2	0.00
Germany	2	0	0	2	1	7	−6	0.00
Hungary	1	0	0	1	0	1	−1	0.00
Netherlands	2	0	1	1	0	1	−1	0.00
Switzerland	2	1	1	0	2	1	+1	50.00
Total	12	2	3	7	7	17	−10	16.67

Source: Results

==== Qualifying ====
Qualifying head-to-head
Opponent	Pld	W	D	L	GF	GA	W%	D%	L%
Austria	2	0	1	1	3	4	0	50	50
Belgium	8	2	1	5	8	16	25	12.5	62.5
Bosnia and Herzegovina	2	2	0	0	3	1	100	0	0
Bulgaria	4	0	3	1	2	3	0	75	25
Cyprus	2	2	0	0	6	0	100	0	0
Czech Republic	4	0	1	3	5	8	0	25	75
Denmark	4	3	0	1	5	2	75	0	25
East Germany	2	1	0	1	3	2	50	0	50
England	4	2	1	1	5	5	50	25	25
Estonia	2	1	1	0	3	2	50	50	0
Faroe Islands	8	6	2	0	23	6	75	25	0
Finland	2	2	0	0	3	0	100	0	0
France	2	2	0	0	2	0	100	0	0
Georgia	6	3	1	2	7	6	50	16.67	33.33
Germany	4	0	1	3	5	8	0	25	75
Gibraltar	2	2	0	0	12	1	100	0	0
Greece	2	1	0	1	1	1	50	0	50
Iceland	2	2	0	0	4	1	100	0	0
Italy	2	0	0	2	1	4	0	0	100
Liechtenstein	2	2	0	0	3	1	100	0	0
Lithuania	8	5	2	1	10	3	62.5	25	12.5
Luxembourg	2	1	1	0	3	0	50	50	0
Netherlands	2	1	0	1	1	6	50	0	50
Northern Ireland	2	1	0	1	3	1	50	0	50
Norway	4	3	1	0	12	7	75	25	0
Poland	2	0	2	0	4	4	0	100	0
Portugal	4	2	0	2	6	5	50	0	50
Republic of Ireland	4	1	2	1	2	2	25	50	25
Romania	4	1	2	1	4	4	25	50	25
Russia	2	0	2	0	1	1	0	100	0
San Marino	4	4	0	0	13	0	100	0	0
Spain	6	1	1	4	7	11	16.67	16.67	66.67
Switzerland	4	1	2	1	6	7	25	50	25
Ukraine	2	1	0	1	3	3	50	0	50
Wales	2	1	1	0	4	3	50	50	0

=== Appearances ===
Rank	Player	Matches	Years
1	Ché Adams	6	2020, 2024
1	Andy Goram	6	1992, 1996
1	Grant Hanley	6	2020, 2024
1	Gary McAllister	6	1992, 1996
1	Stuart McCall	6	1992, 1996
1	John McGinn	6	2020, 2024
1	Callum McGregor	6	2020, 2024
1	Scott McTominay	6	2020, 2024
1	Andy Robertson	6	2020, 2024
10	Gordon Durie	5	1992, 1996
10	Stewart McKimmie	5	1992, 1996
10	Ally McCoist	5	1992, 1996
13	Stuart Armstrong	4	2020, 2024
13	Tom Boyd	4	1992, 1996
13	Ryan Christie	4	2020, 2024
13	Kevin Gallacher	4	1992, 1996
13	Billy Gilmour	4	2020, 2024
13	Jack Hendry	4	2020, 2024
13	Scott McKenna	4	2020, 2024
13	Kieran Tierney	4	2020, 2024

=== Goalscorers ===
Player	Goals	1992	1996	2020	2024
Gary McAllister	1	1			
Brian McClair	1	1			
Ally McCoist	1		1		
Paul McStay	1	1			
Callum McGregor	1			1	
Scott McTominay	1				1
Own goals	1				1
Total	7	3	1	1	2

== See also ==
- Scotland at the FIFA World Cup
