= UEFA Euro 2024 Group A =

Football tournament group stage

Group A of UEFA Euro 2024 took place from 14 to 23 June 2024. The group contained hosts Germany, Scotland, Hungary and Switzerland.

== Teams ==
Draw position	Team	Pot	Method of qualification	Date of qualification	Finals appearance	Last appearance	Previous best performance	Qualifying Rankings November 2023 (Note: The European Qualifiers overall rankings from November 2023 were used for seeding for the final draw.)	FIFA Rankings April 2024
A1	Germany (Note: From 1972 to 1988, Germany competed as West Germany.)	1	Host	27 September 2018	14th	2020	Winners (1972, 1980, 1996)	—N/a	16
A2	Scotland	3	Group A runner-up	15 October 2023	4th	2020	Group stage (1992, 1996, 2020)	13	39
A3	Hungary	2	Group G winner	16 November 2023	5th	2020	Third place (1964)	6	26
A4	Switzerland	4	Group I runner-up	18 November 2023	6th	2020	Quarter-finals (2020)	20	19

== Standings ==
Pos	Team	Pld	W	D	L	GF	GA	GD	Pts	Qualification
1	Germany (H)	3	2	1	0	8	2	+6	7	Advance to knockout stage
2	Switzerland	3	1	2	0	5	3	+2	5	Advance to knockout stage
3	Hungary	3	1	0	2	2	5	−3	3	
4	Scotland	3	0	1	2	2	7	−5	1	

Source: UEFA
Rules for classification: Group stage tiebreakers
(H) Hosts

In the round of 16,

- The winner of Group A, Germany, advanced to play the runner-up of Group C, Denmark.
- The runner-up of Group A, Switzerland, advanced to play the runner-up of Group B, Italy.

== Matches ==
=== Germany vs Scotland ===
Aged 36 years and 327 days, Germany's coach Julian Nagelsmann became the youngest to ever coach in the UEFA European Championship final tournament.

14 June 2024
21:00

Germany	5–1	Scotland
Wirtz 10'; Musiala 19'; Havertz 45+1' (pen.); Füllkrug 68'; Can 90+3'	Report	Rüdiger 87' (o.g.)

Allianz Arena, Munich
Attendance: 65,052
Referee: Clément Turpin (France)

Germany	Scotland

GK	1	Manuel Neuer
RB	6	Joshua Kimmich
CB	2	Antonio Rüdiger
CB	4	Jonathan Tah	(yellow card) 62'
LB	18	Maximilian Mittelstädt
CM	23	Robert Andrich	(yellow card) 31'	(substituted off) 46'
CM	8	Toni Kroos		(substituted off) 80'
RW	10	Jamal Musiala		(substituted off) 74'
AM	21	İlkay Gündoğan (c)
LW	17	Florian Wirtz		(substituted off) 63'
CF	7	Kai Havertz		(substituted off) 63'
Substitutions:
MF	5	Pascal Groß		(substituted on) 46'
MF	19	Leroy Sané		(substituted on) 63'
FW	9	Niclas Füllkrug		(substituted on) 63'
FW	13	Thomas Müller		(substituted on) 74'
MF	25	Emre Can		(substituted on) 80'
Manager:
Julian Nagelsmann

GK	1	Angus Gunn
CB	13	Jack Hendry
CB	15	Ryan Porteous	(red card) 44'
CB	6	Kieran Tierney		(substituted off) 77'
RWB	2	Anthony Ralston	(yellow card) 48'
LWB	3	Andy Robertson (c)
DM	8	Callum McGregor		(substituted off) 67'
AM	4	Scott McTominay
RW	7	John McGinn		(substituted off) 67'
LW	11	Ryan Christie		(substituted off) 82'
CF	10	Ché Adams		(substituted off) 46'
Substitutions:
DF	5	Grant Hanley		(substituted on) 46'
MF	14	Billy Gilmour		(substituted on) 67'
MF	23	Kenny McLean		(substituted on) 67'
DF	26	Scott McKenna		(substituted on) 77'
FW	9	Lawrence Shankland		(substituted on) 82'
Manager:
Steve Clarke

Man of the Match:
Jamal Musiala (Germany)

Assistant referees:
Nicolas Danos (France)
Benjamin Pages (France)
Fourth official:
François Letexier (France)
Reserve assistant referee:
Cyril Mugnier (France)
Video assistant referee:
Jérôme Brisard (France)
Assistant video assistant referees:
Willy Delajod (France)
Massimiliano Irrati (Italy)

=== Hungary vs Switzerland ===
Dominik Szoboszlai became the youngest captain to appear at the UEFA European Championship final tournament, aged 23 years and 234 days. This was the first major tournament meeting between Hungary and Switzerland since the 1938 FIFA World Cup.

15 June 2024
15:00

Hungary	1–3	Switzerland
Varga 66'	Report	Duah 12'; Aebischer 45'; Embolo 90+3'

RheinEnergieStadion, Cologne
Attendance: 41,676
Referee: Slavko Vinčić (Slovenia)

Hungary	Switzerland

GK	1	Péter Gulácsi
CB	2	Ádám Lang		(substituted off) 46'
CB	6	Willi Orbán
CB	4	Attila Szalai	(yellow card) 69'	(substituted off) 79'
RM	5	Attila Fiola
CM	8	Ádám Nagy		(substituted off) 67'
CM	13	András Schäfer
LM	11	Milos Kerkez		(substituted off) 79'
AM	20	Roland Sallai
AM	10	Dominik Szoboszlai (c)
CF	19	Barnabás Varga
Substitutions:
DF	14	Bendegúz Bolla	(yellow card) 88'	(substituted on) 46'
MF	15	László Kleinheisler		(substituted on) 67'
FW	9	Martin Ádám		(substituted on) 79'
DF	24	Márton Dárdai		(substituted on) 79'
Manager:
(Italy) Marco Rossi

GK	1	Yann Sommer
CB	22	Fabian Schär
CB	5	Manuel Akanji
CB	13	Ricardo Rodriguez
RM	3	Silvan Widmer	(yellow card) 5'	(substituted off) 68'
CM	10	Granit Xhaka (c)
CM	8	Remo Freuler	(yellow card) 59'	(substituted off) 86'
LM	19	Dan Ndoye		(substituted off) 86'
AM	20	Michel Aebischer
AM	17	Rubén Vargas		(substituted off) 74'
CF	18	Kwadwo Duah		(substituted off) 68'
Substitutions:
FW	25	Zeki Amdouni		(substituted on) 68'
DF	2	Leonidas Stergiou		(substituted on) 68'
FW	7	Breel Embolo		(substituted on) 74'
MF	16	Vincent Sierro		(substituted on) 86'
MF	26	Fabian Rieder		(substituted on) 86'
Manager:
Murat Yakin			(yellow card) 88'

Man of the Match:
Granit Xhaka (Switzerland)

Assistant referees:
Tomaž Klančnik (Slovenia)
Andraž Kovačič (Slovenia)
Fourth official:
Rade Obrenović (Slovenia)
Reserve assistant referee:
Jure Paprotnik (Slovenia)
Video assistant referee:
Nejc Kajtazovic (Slovenia)
Assistant video assistant referees:
Bartosz Frankowski (Poland)
Tomasz Kwiatkowski (Poland)

=== Germany vs Hungary ===
19 June 2024
18:00

Germany	2–0	Hungary
Musiala 22'; Gündoğan 67'	Report

MHPArena, Stuttgart
Attendance: 54,000
Referee: Danny Makkelie (Netherlands)

Germany	Hungary

GK	1	Manuel Neuer
RB	6	Joshua Kimmich
CB	2	Antonio Rüdiger	(yellow card) 27'
CB	4	Jonathan Tah
LB	18	Maximilian Mittelstädt	(yellow card) 89'
CM	23	Robert Andrich		(substituted off) 72'
CM	8	Toni Kroos
RW	10	Jamal Musiala		(substituted off) 72'
AM	21	İlkay Gündoğan (c)		(substituted off) 84'
LW	17	Florian Wirtz		(substituted off) 58'
CF	7	Kai Havertz		(substituted off) 58'
Substitutions:
MF	19	Leroy Sané		(substituted on) 58'
FW	9	Niclas Füllkrug		(substituted on) 58'
MF	25	Emre Can		(substituted on) 72'
MF	11	Chris Führich		(substituted on) 72'
FW	26	Deniz Undav		(substituted on) 84'
Manager:
Julian Nagelsmann

GK	1	Péter Gulácsi
CB	5	Attila Fiola
CB	6	Willi Orbán
CB	24	Márton Dárdai
RM	14	Bendegúz Bolla		(substituted off) 75'
CM	8	Ádám Nagy		(substituted off) 64'
CM	13	András Schäfer
LM	11	Milos Kerkez		(substituted off) 75'
AM	20	Roland Sallai		(substituted off) 87'
AM	10	Dominik Szoboszlai (c)	(yellow card) 90+3'
CF	19	Barnabás Varga	(yellow card) 22'	(substituted off) 87'
Substitutions:
MF	15	László Kleinheisler		(substituted on) 64'
DF	18	Zsolt Nagy		(substituted on) 75'
FW	9	Martin Ádám		(substituted on) 75'
MF	16	Dániel Gazdag		(substituted on) 87'
FW	23	Kevin Csoboth		(substituted on) 87'
Other disciplinary actions:
TS	—	Attila Tömő	(yellow card) 45+1'
Manager:
(Italy) Marco Rossi			(yellow card) 90+3'

Man of the Match:
İlkay Gündoğan (Germany)

Assistant referees:
Hessel Steegstra (Netherlands)
Jan de Vries (Netherlands)
Fourth official:
Serdar Gözübüyük (Netherlands)
Reserve assistant referee:
Johan Balder (Netherlands)
Video assistant referee:
Rob Dieperink (Netherlands)
Assistant video assistant referees:
Pol van Boekel (Netherlands)
Stuart Attwell (England)

=== Scotland vs Switzerland ===
19 June 2024
21:00

Scotland	1–1	Switzerland
McTominay 13'	Report	Shaqiri 26'

RheinEnergieStadion, Cologne
Attendance: 42,711
Referee: Ivan Kružliak (Slovakia)

Scotland	Switzerland

GK	1	Angus Gunn
CB	13	Jack Hendry
CB	5	Grant Hanley
CB	6	Kieran Tierney		(substituted off) 61'
RWB	2	Anthony Ralston
LWB	3	Andy Robertson (c)
CM	14	Billy Gilmour		(substituted off) 79'
CM	8	Callum McGregor
RW	4	Scott McTominay	(yellow card) 51'
LW	7	John McGinn	(yellow card) 71'	(substituted off) 90'
CF	10	Ché Adams		(substituted off) 90'
Substitutions:
DF	26	Scott McKenna	(yellow card) 68'	(substituted on) 61'
MF	23	Kenny McLean		(substituted on) 79'
FW	11	Ryan Christie		(substituted on) 90'
FW	9	Lawrence Shankland		(substituted on) 90'
Manager:
Steve Clarke

GK	1	Yann Sommer
CB	22	Fabian Schär
CB	5	Manuel Akanji
CB	13	Ricardo Rodriguez	(yellow card) 31'
RM	3	Silvan Widmer		(substituted off) 86'
CM	10	Granit Xhaka (c)
CM	8	Remo Freuler		(substituted off) 75'
LM	23	Xherdan Shaqiri		(substituted off) 60'
AM	20	Michel Aebischer
AM	17	Rubén Vargas		(substituted off) 75'
CF	19	Dan Ndoye		(substituted off) 86'
Substitutions:
FW	7	Breel Embolo		(substituted on) 60'
MF	26	Fabian Rieder		(substituted on) 75'
MF	16	Vincent Sierro	(yellow card) 86'	(substituted on) 75'
FW	25	Zeki Amdouni		(substituted on) 86'
DF	2	Leonidas Stergiou		(substituted on) 86'
Manager:
Murat Yakin

Man of the Match:
Manuel Akanji (Switzerland)

Assistant referees:
Branislav Hancko (Slovakia)
Jan Pozor (Slovakia)
Fourth official:
Irfan Peljto (Bosnia and Herzegovina)
Reserve assistant referee:
Senad Ibrišimbegović (Bosnia and Herzegovina)
Video assistant referee:
Tomasz Kwiatkowski (Poland)
Assistant video assistant referees:
Bartosz Frankowski (Poland)
Nejc Kajtazovič (Slovenia)

=== Switzerland vs Germany ===
23 June 2024
21:00

Switzerland	1–1	Germany
Ndoye 28'	Report	Füllkrug 90+2'

Waldstadion, Frankfurt
Attendance: 46,685
Referee: Daniele Orsato (Italy)

Switzerland	Germany

GK	1	Yann Sommer
CB	22	Fabian Schär
CB	5	Manuel Akanji
CB	13	Ricardo Rodriguez
RM	3	Silvan Widmer	(yellow card) 81'
CM	8	Remo Freuler
CM	10	Granit Xhaka (c)	(yellow card) 66'
LM	20	Michel Aebischer
AM	19	Dan Ndoye	(yellow card) 25'	(substituted off) 65'
AM	26	Fabian Rieder		(substituted off) 65'
CF	7	Breel Embolo		(substituted off) 65'
Substitutions:
FW	18	Kwadwo Duah		(substituted on) 65'
MF	17	Rubén Vargas		(substituted on) 65'
FW	25	Zeki Amdouni		(substituted on) 65'
Manager:
Murat Yakin

GK	1	Manuel Neuer
RB	6	Joshua Kimmich
CB	2	Antonio Rüdiger
CB	4	Jonathan Tah	(yellow card) 38'	(substituted off) 61'
LB	18	Maximilian Mittelstädt		(substituted off) 61'
CM	23	Robert Andrich		(substituted off) 65'
CM	8	Toni Kroos
RW	10	Jamal Musiala		(substituted off) 76'
AM	21	İlkay Gündoğan (c)
LW	17	Florian Wirtz		(substituted off) 76'
CF	7	Kai Havertz
Substitutions:
DF	15	Nico Schlotterbeck		(substituted on) 61'
DF	3	David Raum		(substituted on) 61'
FW	14	Maximilian Beier		(substituted on) 65'
MF	19	Leroy Sané		(substituted on) 76'
FW	9	Niclas Füllkrug		(substituted on) 76'
Manager:
Julian Nagelsmann

Man of the Match:
Granit Xhaka (Switzerland)

Assistant referees:
Ciro Carbone (Italy)
Alessandro Giallatini (Italy)
Fourth official:
Marco Guida (Italy)
Reserve assistant referee:
Filippo Meli (Italy)
Video assistant referee:
Massimiliano Irrati (Italy)
Assistant video assistant referees:
Paolo Valeri (Italy)
Cătălin Popa (Romania)

=== Scotland vs Hungary ===
Kevin Csoboth's winning goal in the 100th minute was the European Championship's latest ever in stoppage time.

23 June 2024
21:00

Scotland	0–1	Hungary
	Report	Csoboth 90+10'

MHPArena, Stuttgart
Attendance: 54,000
Referee: Facundo Tello (Argentina)

Scotland	Hungary

GK	1	Angus Gunn
RB	2	Anthony Ralston		(substituted off) 83'
CB	13	Jack Hendry
CB	5	Grant Hanley
CB	26	Scott McKenna
LB	3	Andy Robertson (c)		(substituted off) 89'
RM	7	John McGinn		(substituted off) 76'
CM	14	Billy Gilmour		(substituted off) 83'
CM	8	Callum McGregor
LM	4	Scott McTominay	(yellow card) 50'
CF	10	Ché Adams		(substituted off) 76'
Substitutions:
MF	17	Stuart Armstrong		(substituted on) 76'
FW	9	Lawrence Shankland		(substituted on) 76'
MF	11	Ryan Christie		(substituted on) 83'
MF	23	Kenny McLean		(substituted on) 83'
FW	18	Lewis Morgan		(substituted on) 89'
Manager:
Steve Clarke

GK	1	Péter Gulácsi
CB	21	Endre Botka
CB	6	Willi Orbán	(yellow card) 26'
CB	24	Márton Dárdai		(substituted off) 74'
RM	14	Bendegúz Bolla		(substituted off) 86'
CM	17	Callum Styles	(yellow card) 18'	(substituted off) 61'
CM	13	András Schäfer	(yellow card) 44'
LM	11	Milos Kerkez		(substituted off) 86'
AM	20	Roland Sallai
AM	10	Dominik Szoboszlai (c)
CF	19	Barnabás Varga		(substituted off) 74'
Substitutions:
MF	8	Ádám Nagy		(substituted on) 61'
DF	4	Attila Szalai		(substituted on) 74'
FW	9	Martin Ádám		(substituted on) 74'
FW	23	Kevin Csoboth	(yellow card) 90+11'	(substituted on) 86'
MF	18	Zsolt Nagy		(substituted on) 86'
Other disciplinary actions:
MF	15	László Kleinheisler	(yellow card) 75'
Manager:
(Italy) Marco Rossi

Man of the Match:
Roland Sallai (Hungary)

Assistant referees:
Gabriel Chade (Argentina)
Ezequiel Brailovsky (Argentina)
Fourth official:
Espen Eskås (Norway)
Reserve assistant referee:
Jan Erik Engan (Norway)
Video assistant referee:
Alejandro Hernández Hernández (Spain)
Assistant video assistant referees:
Juan Martínez Munuera (Spain)
Tiago Martins (Portugal)

== Discipline ==
Fair play points would have been used as a tiebreaker if the head-to-head and overall records of teams had been tied (and if a penalty shoot-out was not applicable as a tiebreaker). These were calculated based on yellow and red cards received by players and team officials in all group matches as follows:

- yellow card = 1 point
- red card as a result of two yellow cards = 3 points
- direct red card = 3 points
- yellow card followed by direct red card = 4 points

Only one of the above deductions was applied to a player or team official in a single match.

Team	Match 1				Match 2				Match 3				Points
Team	Booked	(yellow card) (yellow-red card)	Sent off (straight red)	(yellow card) (red card)	Booked	(yellow card) (yellow-red card)	Sent off (straight red)	(yellow card) (red card)	Booked	(yellow card) (yellow-red card)	Sent off (straight red)	(yellow card) (red card)	Points
Germany	2				2				1				−5
Switzerland	3				2				3				−8
Scotland	1		1		3				1				−8
Hungary	2				4 (Note: Count includes a card from a technical staff member of the team)				5				−11

== See also ==
- Germany at the UEFA European Championship
- Hungary at the UEFA European Championship
- Scotland at the UEFA European Championship
- Switzerland at the UEFA European Championship
