= UEFA Euro 1996 Group A =

International football competition

Group A of UEFA Euro 1996 was one of four groups in the final tournament's initial group stage. It began on 8 June and was completed on 18 June. The group consisted of hosts England, Switzerland, the Netherlands and Scotland.

England won the group and advanced to the quarter-finals, along with the Netherlands. Scotland and Switzerland failed to advance.

== Teams ==
Draw position	Team	Method of qualification	Date of qualification	Finals appearance	Last appearance	Previous best performance	FIFA Rankings May 1996
A1 (seed)	England	Host	5 May 1992	5th	1992	Third place (1968)	24
A2	Switzerland	Group 3 winner	11 October 1995	1st	—	Debut	21
A3	Netherlands	Play-off winner	13 December 1995	5th	1992	Winners (1988)	13
A4	Scotland	Group 8 runner-up (4th best runner-up)	15 November 1995	2nd	1992	Group stage (1992)	31

== Standings ==
Pos	Team	Pld	W	D	L	GF	GA	GD	Pts	Qualification
1	England (H)	3	2	1	0	7	2	+5	7	Advance to knockout stage
2	Netherlands	3	1	1	1	3	4	−1	4 (Note: Tied on head-to-head result (Netherlands 0–0 Scotland) and overall goal difference (−1). Overall goals for was used as the tiebreaker.)	Advance to knockout stage
3	Scotland	3	1	1	1	1	2	−1	4	
4	Switzerland	3	0	1	2	1	4	−3	1	

Source: UEFA
Rules for classification: Group stage tiebreakers
(H) Hosts
Notes:

In the quarter-finals,

- The winner of Group A, England, advanced to play the runner-up of Group B, Spain.
- The runner-up of Group A, Netherlands, advanced to play the winner of Group B, France.

== Matches ==
=== England vs Switzerland ===
8 June 1996
15:00

England	1–1	Switzerland
Shearer 23'	Report	Türkyilmaz 83' (pen.)

Wembley Stadium, London
Attendance: 76,567
Referee: Manuel Díaz Vega (Spain)

England	Switzerland

GK	1	David Seaman
RB	2	Gary Neville	(yellow card) 26'
CB	5	Tony Adams (c)	(yellow card) 80'
CB	6	Gareth Southgate
LB	3	Stuart Pearce
DM	4	Paul Ince
RM	11	Darren Anderton
LM	17	Steve McManaman		(substituted off) 70'
AM	8	Paul Gascoigne		(substituted off) 77'
SS	10	Teddy Sheringham		(substituted off) 70'
CF	9	Alan Shearer
Substitutions:
MF	20	Steve Stone		(substituted on) 70'
MF	14	Nick Barmby		(substituted on) 70'
MF	7	David Platt		(substituted on) 77'
Manager:
Terry Venables

GK	1	Marco Pascolo
SW	5	Alain Geiger (c)		(substituted off) 71'
RB	13	Sébastien Jeanneret
CB	4	Stéphane Henchoz
CB	15	Ramon Vega	(yellow card) 89'
LB	3	Yvan Quentin	(yellow card) 43'
DM	17	Johann Vogel	(yellow card) 28'
RM	21	Christophe Bonvin		(substituted off) 67'
CM	10	Ciriaco Sforza
LM	9	Marco Grassi	(yellow card) 84'
CF	14	Kubilay Türkyilmaz
Substitutions:
FW	11	Stéphane Chapuisat		(substituted on) 67'
MF	16	Marcel Koller		(substituted on) 71'
Manager:
(Portugal) Artur Jorge

Man of the Match:
Alan Shearer (England)

Assistant referees:
Joaquín Olmos González (Spain)
Fernando Tresaco Gracia (Spain)
Fourth official:
José María García-Aranda (Spain)

=== Netherlands vs Scotland ===
10 June 1996
16:30

Netherlands	0–0	Scotland
	Report

Villa Park, Birmingham
Attendance: 34,363
Referee: Leif Sundell (Sweden)

Netherlands	Scotland

GK	1	Edwin van der Sar
CB	2	Michael Reiziger
CB	18	Johan de Kock
CB	15	Winston Bogarde
RM	6	Ronald de Boer (c)		(substituted off) 68'
CM	4	Clarence Seedorf
CM	8	Edgar Davids
LM	14	Richard Witschge	(yellow card) 26'	(substituted off) 78'
RF	7	Gaston Taument	(yellow card) 28'	(substituted off) 63'
CF	10	Dennis Bergkamp
LF	17	Jordi Cruyff
Substitutions:
FW	9	Patrick Kluivert		(substituted on) 63'
MF	12	Aron Winter		(substituted on) 68'
MF	20	Philip Cocu		(substituted on) 78'
Manager:
Guus Hiddink

GK	12	Andy Goram
RB	2	Stewart McKimmie		(substituted off) 85'
CB	5	Colin Hendry
CB	4	Colin Calderwood
LB	3	Tom Boyd	(yellow card) 4'
CM	8	Stuart McCall
CM	10	Gary McAllister (c)
CM	11	John Collins
RF	14	Gordon Durie
CF	18	Kevin Gallacher	(yellow card) 32'	(substituted off) 56'
LF	20	Scott Booth		(substituted off) 46'
Substitutions:
FW	7	John Spencer		(substituted on) 46'
MF	17	Billy McKinlay		(substituted on) 56'
MF	16	Craig Burley		(substituted on) 85'
Manager:
Craig Brown

Man of the Match:
Gary McAllister (Scotland)

Assistant referees:
Kenneth Petersson (Sweden)
Mikael Hansson (Sweden)
Fourth official:
Karl-Erik Nilsson (Sweden)

=== Switzerland vs Netherlands ===
13 June 1996
19:30

Switzerland	0–2	Netherlands
	Report	Cruyff 66'; Bergkamp 79'

Villa Park, Birmingham
Attendance: 36,800
Referee: Atanas Uzunov (Bulgaria)

Switzerland	Netherlands

GK	1	Marco Pascolo
RB	13	Sébastien Jeanneret	(yellow card) 32'	(substituted off) 69'
CB	4	Stéphane Henchoz
CB	15	Ramon Vega
LB	3	Yvan Quentin
DM	17	Johann Vogel
RM	2	Marc Hottiger
CM	10	Ciriaco Sforza (c)
LM	9	Marco Grassi	(yellow card) 72'
CF	11	Stéphane Chapuisat	(yellow card) 40'
CF	14	Kubilay Türkyilmaz	(yellow card) 62'
Substitutions:
MF	20	Alexandre Comisetti		(substituted on) 69'
Manager:
(Portugal) Artur Jorge

GK	1	Edwin van der Sar
CB	2	Michael Reiziger
CB	3	Danny Blind (c)
CB	15	Winston Bogarde
RM	6	Ronald de Boer		(substituted off) 80'
CM	12	Aron Winter
CM	4	Clarence Seedorf	(yellow card) 14'	(substituted off) 26'
LM	14	Richard Witschge
RF	17	Jordi Cruyff		(substituted off) 84'
CF	10	Dennis Bergkamp
LF	11	Peter Hoekstra
Substitutions:
DF	18	Johan de Kock		(substituted on) 26'
MF	8	Edgar Davids		(substituted on) 80'
FW	9	Patrick Kluivert		(substituted on) 84'
Manager:
Guus Hiddink

Man of the Match:
Dennis Bergkamp (Netherlands)

Assistant referees:
Ivan Borissov Lekov (Bulgaria)
Iordan Iordanov (Bulgaria)
Fourth official:
Stefan Ormandjiev (Bulgaria)

=== Scotland vs England ===
15 June 1996
15:00

Scotland	0–2	England
	Report	Shearer 53'; Gascoigne 79'

Wembley Stadium, London
Attendance: 76,864
Referee: Pierluigi Pairetto (Italy)

Scotland	England

GK	12	Andy Goram
CB	4	Colin Calderwood
CB	5	Colin Hendry	(yellow card) 70'
CB	3	Tom Boyd
RWB	2	Stewart McKimmie
LWB	13	Tosh McKinlay		(substituted off) 82'
CM	8	Stuart McCall
CM	10	Gary McAllister (c)
CM	11	John Collins	(yellow card) 29'
CF	14	Gordon Durie		(substituted off) 87'
CF	7	John Spencer	(yellow card) 38'	(substituted off) 67'
Substitutions:
FW	9	Ally McCoist		(substituted on) 67'
MF	16	Craig Burley		(substituted on) 82'
MF	15	Eoin Jess		(substituted on) 87'
Manager:
Craig Brown

GK	1	David Seaman
RCB	2	Gary Neville
CB	5	Tony Adams (c)
LCB	3	Stuart Pearce		(substituted off) 46'
DM	6	Gareth Southgate
DM	4	Paul Ince	(yellow card) 68'	(substituted off) 80'
RWB	11	Darren Anderton
LWB	17	Steve McManaman
AM	8	Paul Gascoigne
SS	10	Teddy Sheringham
CF	9	Alan Shearer	(yellow card) 75'
Substitutions:
MF	15	Jamie Redknapp		(substituted on) 46'	(substituted off) 85'
MF	20	Steve Stone		(substituted on) 80'
DF	16	Sol Campbell			(substituted on) 85'
Manager:
Terry Venables

Man of the Match:
David Seaman (England)

Assistant referees:
Donato Nicoletti (Italy)
Tullio Manfredini (Italy)
Fourth official:
Marcello Nicchi (Italy)

=== Scotland vs Switzerland ===
18 June 1996
19:30

Scotland	1–0	Switzerland
McCoist 36'	Report

Villa Park, Birmingham
Attendance: 34,926
Referee: Václav Krondl (Czech Republic)

Scotland	Switzerland

GK	12	Andy Goram
RB	13	Tosh McKinlay		(substituted off) 60'
CB	4	Colin Calderwood	(yellow card) 23'
CB	5	Colin Hendry
LB	3	Tom Boyd
RM	16	Craig Burley
CM	8	Stuart McCall	(yellow card) 28'
CM	10	Gary McAllister (c)
LM	11	John Collins	(yellow card) 42'
CF	14	Gordon Durie
CF	9	Ally McCoist		(substituted off) 84'
Substitutions:
FW	20	Scott Booth		(substituted on) 60'
FW	7	John Spencer		(substituted on) 84'
Manager:
Craig Brown

GK	1	Marco Pascolo
RB	2	Marc Hottiger
CB	4	Stéphane Henchoz
CB	15	Ramon Vega	(yellow card) 23'
LB	16	Marcel Koller		(substituted off) 46'
DM	17	Johann Vogel	(yellow card) 53'
RM	21	Christophe Bonvin
CM	10	Ciriaco Sforza (c)
LM	3	Yvan Quentin		(substituted off) 81'
CF	11	Stéphane Chapuisat		(substituted off) 46'
CF	14	Kubilay Türkyilmaz
Substitutions:
MF	6	Raphael Wicky	(yellow card) 55'	(substituted on) 46'
FW	7	Sébastien Fournier	(yellow card) 63'	(substituted on) 46'
MF	20	Alexandre Comisetti		(substituted on) 81'
Manager:
(Portugal) Artur Jorge

Man of the Match:
Stuart McCall (Scotland)

Assistant referees:
Milan Brabec (Czech Republic)
Otakar Draštík (Czech Republic)
Fourth official:
Jiří Ulrich (Czech Republic)

=== Netherlands vs England ===
18 June 1996
19:30

Netherlands	1–4	England
Kluivert 78'	Report	Shearer 23' (pen.), 57'; Sheringham 51', 62'

Wembley Stadium, London
Attendance: 76,798
Referee: Gerd Grabher (Austria)

Netherlands	England

GK	1	Edwin van der Sar
CB	2	Michael Reiziger
CB	3	Danny Blind (c)	(yellow card) 23'
CB	15	Winston Bogarde
RM	6	Ronald de Boer		(substituted off) 73'
CM	4	Clarence Seedorf
CM	12	Aron Winter	(yellow card) 18'
LM	14	Richard Witschge		(substituted off) 46'
RF	17	Jordi Cruyff
CF	10	Dennis Bergkamp	(yellow card) 67'
LF	11	Peter Hoekstra		(substituted off) 72'
Substitutions:
DF	18	Johan de Kock		(substituted on) 46'
FW	9	Patrick Kluivert		(substituted on) 72'
MF	20	Philip Cocu		(substituted on) 73'
Manager:
Guus Hiddink

GK	1	David Seaman
RB	2	Gary Neville
CB	5	Tony Adams (c)
CB	6	Gareth Southgate	(yellow card) 90'
LB	3	Stuart Pearce
DM	4	Paul Ince	(yellow card) 43'	(substituted off) 68'
RM	11	Darren Anderton
LM	17	Steve McManaman
AM	8	Paul Gascoigne
SS	10	Teddy Sheringham	(yellow card) 41'	(substituted off) 77'
CF	9	Alan Shearer		(substituted off) 76'
Substitutions:
MF	7	David Platt		(substituted on) 68'
MF	14	Nick Barmby		(substituted on) 76'
FW	21	Robbie Fowler		(substituted on) 77'
Manager:
Terry Venables

Man of the Match:
Teddy Sheringham (England)

Assistant referees:
Egon Bereuter (Austria)
Manfred Zeiszer (Austria)
Fourth official:
Günter Benkö (Austria)

== See also ==
- England at the UEFA European Championship
- Netherlands at the UEFA European Championship
- Scotland at the UEFA European Championship
- Switzerland at the UEFA European Championship
