= England at the UEFA European Championship =

International football delegation

The UEFA European Championship is one of the major competitive international football tournaments, first played in 1960. The finals stage of the tournament takes place every four years, with a qualifying competition beforehand. The sixteenth tournament was held across Europe in 2021 (postponed from 2020 due to the COVID-19 pandemic).

The England national football team first attempted to qualify for the finals of the tournament in 1964, having declined to enter in 1960. They first qualified in 1968, and have since participated in the finals on eleven occasions, including in 1996, when they were the host nation and thus did not need to qualify.

England's best performances at the finals were a runner-up finish at Euro 2020, when they lost the final to Italy on penalties at Wembley, and at Euro 2024, when they lost the final 2–1 to Spain in Berlin, being the first team to lose consecutive European Championship finals. They had a third-place finish in Italy in 1968, when only four teams competed in the finals tournament, and reached one further semi-final in 1996, losing to Germany, also on home soil and on penalties. The team reached the quarter-finals on two other occasions, losing to host nation Portugal on penalties in 2004 and to Italy in Ukraine in 2012, also on penalties.

England were eliminated in the round of 16 by Iceland in 2016. On the other four occasions (1980, 1988, 1992 and 2000), they did not progress beyond the group stage.

== Overall record ==
Year	Round	Pos	Pld	W	D*	L	GF	GA	Squad	Pld	W	D	L	GF	GA	Manager(s)
(France) 1960	Did not enter									Did not enter						Winterbottom
(Francoist Spain) 1964	Did not qualify									2	0	1	1	3	6	Winterbottom, Ramsey
(Italy) 1968	Third place	3rd	2	1	0	1	2	1	Squad	8	6	1	1	18	6	Ramsey
(Belgium) 1972	Did not qualify									8	5	2	1	16	6	Ramsey
(Socialist Federal Republic of Yugoslavia) 1976	Did not qualify									6	3	2	1	11	3	Revie
(Italy) 1980	Group stage	6th	3	1	1	1	3	3	Squad	8	7	1	0	22	5	Greenwood
(France) 1984	Did not qualify									8	5	2	1	23	3	Robson
(West Germany) 1988	Group stage	7th	3	0	0	3	2	7	Squad	6	5	1	0	19	1	Robson
(Sweden) 1992	Group stage	7th	3	0	2	1	1	2	Squad	6	3	3	0	7	3	Taylor
(England) 1996	Semi-finals	3rd	5	2	3	0	8	3	Squad	Qualified as hosts						Venables
(Belgium) (Netherlands) 2000	Group stage	11th	3	1	0	2	5	6	Squad	10	4	4	2	16	5	Hoddle, Keegan
(Portugal) 2004	Quarter-finals	5th	4	2	1	1	10	6	Squad	8	6	2	0	14	5	Eriksson
(Austria) (Switzerland) 2008	Did not qualify									12	7	2	3	24	7	McClaren
(Poland) (Ukraine) 2012	Quarter-finals	5th	4	2	2	0	5	3	Squad	8	5	3	0	17	5	Capello, Hodgson
(France) 2016	Round of 16	12th	4	1	2	1	4	4	Squad	10	10	0	0	31	3	Hodgson
(Europe) 2020	Runners-up	2nd	7	5	2	0	11	2	Squad	8	7	0	1	37	6	Southgate
(Germany) 2024	Runners-up	2nd	7	3	3	1	8	6	Squad	8	6	2	0	22	4	Southgate
(United Kingdom) (Republic of Ireland) 2028	To be determined									To be determined						
(Italy) (Turkey) 2032	To be determined									To be determined						
Total	Runners-up	11/17	45	18	16	11	59	43	—	116	79	26	11	270	68	—
Runners-up Third place Hosted tournament *Draws include knockout matches decided via penalty shoot-out. **Red border colour indicates tournament was held on home soil. ***Third place includes all tournaments where England reached the semi-finals following Euro 1980 as the third place play-offs were scrapped from the following editions of the tournament. Correct as of 14 July 2024, after the final match against Spain

=== List of matches ===
Year	Round	Opponent	Score	England scorer(s)
(Italy) 1968	Semi-finals	Yugoslavia	0–1	—
(Italy) 1968	Third place play-off	Soviet Union	2–0	B. Charlton, Hurst
(Italy) 1980	Group 2	Belgium	1–1	Wilkins
(Italy) 1980	Group 2	Italy	0–1	—
(Italy) 1980	Group 2	Spain	2–1	Brooking, Woodcock
(Germany) 1988	Group 2	Republic of Ireland	0–1	—
(Germany) 1988	Group 2	Netherlands	1–3	Robson
(Germany) 1988	Group 2	Soviet Union	1–3	Adams
(Sweden) 1992	Group 1	Denmark	0–0	—
(Sweden) 1992	Group 1	France	0–0	—
(Sweden) 1992	Group 1	Sweden	1–2	Platt
(England) 1996	Group A	Switzerland	1–1	Shearer
(England) 1996	Group A	Scotland	2–0	Shearer, Gascoigne
(England) 1996	Group A	Netherlands	4–1	Shearer (2), Sheringham (2)
(England) 1996	Quarter-finals	Spain	0–0 (a.e.t.) (4–2 p)	—
(England) 1996	Semi-finals	Germany	1–1 (a.e.t.) (5–6 p)	Shearer
(Belgium) (Netherlands) 2000	Group A	Portugal	2–3	Scholes, McManaman
(Belgium) (Netherlands) 2000	Group A	Germany	1–0	Shearer
(Belgium) (Netherlands) 2000	Group A	Romania	2–3	Shearer, Owen
(Portugal) 2004	Group B	France	1–2	Lampard
(Portugal) 2004	Group B	Switzerland	3–0	Rooney (2), Gerrard
(Portugal) 2004	Group B	Croatia	4–2	Scholes, Rooney (2), Lampard
(Portugal) 2004	Quarter-finals	Portugal	2–2 (a.e.t.) (5–6 p)	Owen, Lampard
(Poland) (Ukraine) 2012	Group D	France	1–1	Lescott
(Poland) (Ukraine) 2012	Group D	Sweden	3–2	Carroll, Walcott, Welbeck
(Poland) (Ukraine) 2012	Group D	Ukraine	1–0	Rooney
(Poland) (Ukraine) 2012	Quarter-finals	Italy	0–0 (a.e.t.) (2–4 p)	—
(France) 2016	Group B	Russia	1–1	Dier
(France) 2016	Group B	Wales	2–1	Vardy, Sturridge
(France) 2016	Group B	Slovakia	0–0	—
(France) 2016	Round of 16	Iceland	1–2	Rooney
(Europe) 2020	Group D	Croatia	1–0	Sterling
(Europe) 2020	Group D	Scotland	0–0	—
(Europe) 2020	Group D	Czech Republic	1–0	Sterling
(Europe) 2020	Round of 16	Germany	2–0	Sterling, Kane
(Europe) 2020	Quarter-finals	Ukraine	4–0	Kane (2), Maguire, J. Henderson
(Europe) 2020	Semi-finals	Denmark	2–1 (a.e.t.)	Kjær (o.g.), Kane
(Europe) 2020	Final	Italy	1–1 (a.e.t.) (2–3 p)	Shaw
(Germany) 2024	Group C	Serbia	1–0	Bellingham
(Germany) 2024	Group C	Denmark	1–1	Kane
(Germany) 2024	Group C	Slovenia	0–0	—
(Germany) 2024	Round of 16	Slovakia	2–1 (a.e.t.)	Bellingham, Kane
(Germany) 2024	Quarter-finals	Switzerland	1–1 (a.e.t.) (5–3 p)	Saka
(Germany) 2024	Semi-finals	Netherlands	2–1	Kane, Watkins
(Germany) 2024	Final	Spain	1–2	Palmer

== Head-to-head record ==
Opponent	Pld	W	D	L	GF	GA
Belgium	1	0	1	0	1	1
Croatia	2	2	0	0	5	2
Czech Republic	1	1	0	0	1	0
Denmark	3	1	2	0	3	2
France	3	0	2	1	2	3
Germany	3	2	1	0	4	1
Iceland	1	0	0	1	1	2
Italy	3	0	2	1	1	2
Netherlands	3	2	0	1	7	5
Portugal	2	0	1	1	4	5
Republic of Ireland	1	0	0	1	0	1
Romania	1	0	0	1	2	3
Russia	3	1	1	1	4	4
Scotland	2	1	1	0	2	0
Serbia	2	1	0	1	1	1
Slovakia	2	1	1	0	2	1
Slovenia	1	0	1	0	0	0
Spain	3	1	1	1	3	3
Sweden	2	1	0	1	4	4
Switzerland	3	1	2	0	5	2
Ukraine	2	2	0	0	5	0
Wales	1	1	0	0	2	1
Total	45	18	16	11	59	43

== History ==
=== UEFA Euro 1968: Italy ===
==== Qualifying ====
Group stage

Pos	Team	Pld	W	D	L	GF	GA	GD	Pts	Qualification	(England)	(Scotland)	(Wales)	(Northern Ireland)
1	England	6	4	1	1	15	5	+10	9	Advance to quarter-finals	—	2–3	5–1	2–0
2	Scotland	6	3	2	1	10	8	+2	8		1–1	—	3–2	2–1
3	Wales	6	1	2	3	6	12	−6	4		0–3	1–1	—	2–0
4	Northern Ireland	6	1	1	4	2	8	−6	3		0–2	1–0	0–0	—

Source: UEFA
Rules for classification: Qualification tiebreakers

Quarter-finals

Team 1	Agg.	Team 2	1st leg	2nd leg
Bulgaria	3–4	Italy	3–2	0–2
Hungary	2–3	Soviet Union	2–0	0–3
England	3–1	Spain	1–0	2–1
France	2–6	Yugoslavia	1–1	1–5

==== Final tournament ====
Semi-finals

5 June 1968
21:15

Yugoslavia	1–0	England
Džajić 86'	Report

Stadio Comunale, Florence
Attendance: 21,834
Referee: José María Ortiz de Mendíbil (Spain)

Third place play-off

8 June 1968
18:45

England	2–0	Soviet Union
B. Charlton 39'; Hurst 63'	Report

Stadio Olimpico, Rome
Attendance: 68,817
Referee: István Zsolt (Hungary)

=== UEFA Euro 1980: Italy ===
==== Qualifying ====
Group stage

Pos	Team	Pld	W	D	L	GF	GA	GD	Pts	Qualification	(England)	(Northern Ireland)	(Republic of Ireland)	(Bulgaria)	(Denmark)
1	England	8	7	1	0	22	5	+17	15	Qualify for final tournament	—	4–0	2–0	2–0	1–0
2	Northern Ireland	8	4	1	3	8	14	−6	9		1–5	—	1–0	2–0	2–1
3	Republic of Ireland	8	2	3	3	9	8	+1	7		1–1	0–0	—	3–0	2–0
4	Bulgaria	8	2	1	5	6	14	−8	5		0–3	0–2	1–0	—	3–0
5	Denmark	8	1	2	5	13	17	−4	4		3–4	4–0	3–3	2–2	—

Source: UEFA
Rules for classification: Qualification tiebreakers

==== Group stage ====
Pos	Team	Pld	W	D	L	GF	GA	GD	Pts	Qualification
1	Belgium	3	1	2	0	3	2	+1	4	Advance to final
2	Italy (H)	3	1	2	0	1	0	+1	4	Advance to third place play-off
3	England	3	1	1	1	3	3	0	3	
4	Spain	3	0	1	2	2	4	−2	1	

Source: UEFA
Rules for classification: Group stage tiebreakers
(H) Hosts
12 June 1980
17:45

Belgium	1–1	England
Ceulemans 29'	Report	Wilkins 26'

Stadio Comunale, Turin
Attendance: 15,186
Referee: Heinz Aldinger (West Germany)

15 June 1980
20:30

England	0–1	Italy
	Report	Tardelli 79'

Stadio Comunale, Turin
Attendance: 59,649
Referee: Nicolae Rainea (Romania)

18 June 1980
17:45

Spain	1–2	England
Dani 48' (pen.)	Report	Brooking 19'; Woodcock 61'

Stadio San Paolo, Naples
Attendance: 14,440
Referee: Erich Linemayr (Austria)

=== UEFA Euro 1988: West Germany ===
==== Qualifying ====
Group stage

Pos	Team	Pld	W	D	L	GF	GA	GD	Pts	Qualification	(England)	(Socialist Federal Republic of Yugoslavia)	(Northern Ireland)	(Turkey)
1	England	6	5	1	0	19	1	+18	11	Qualify for final tournament	—	2–0	3–0	8–0
2	Yugoslavia	6	4	0	2	13	9	+4	8		1–4	—	3–0	4–0
3	Northern Ireland	6	1	1	4	2	10	−8	3		0–2	1–2	—	1–0
4	Turkey	6	0	2	4	2	16	−14	2		0–0	2–3	0–0	—

Source: UEFA
Rules for classification: Qualification tiebreakers

==== Group stage ====
Pos	Team	Pld	W	D	L	GF	GA	GD	Pts	Qualification
1	Soviet Union	3	2	1	0	5	2	+3	5	Advance to knockout stage
2	Netherlands	3	2	0	1	4	2	+2	4	Advance to knockout stage
3	Republic of Ireland	3	1	1	1	2	2	0	3	
4	England	3	0	0	3	2	7	−5	0	

Source: UEFA
Rules for classification: Group stage tiebreakers
12 June 1988
15:30

England	0–1	Republic of Ireland
	Report	Houghton 6'

Neckarstadion, Stuttgart
Attendance: 51,373
Referee: Siegfried Kirschen (East Germany)

15 June 1988
17:15

England	1–3	Netherlands
Robson 53'	Report	Van Basten 44', 71', 75'

Rheinstadion, Düsseldorf
Attendance: 63,940
Referee: Paolo Casarin (Italy)

18 June 1988
15:30

England	1–3	Soviet Union
Adams 16'	Report	Aleinikov 3'; Mykhaylychenko 28'; Pasulko 73'

Waldstadion, Frankfurt
Attendance: 48,335
Referee: José Rosa dos Santos (Portugal)

=== UEFA Euro 1992: Sweden ===
==== Qualifying ====
Group stage

Pos	Team	Pld	W	D	L	GF	GA	GD	Pts	Qualification	(England)	(Republic of Ireland)	(Poland)	(Turkey)
1	England	6	3	3	0	7	3	+4	9	Qualify for final tournament	—	1–1	2–0	1–0
2	Republic of Ireland	6	2	4	0	13	6	+7	8		1–1	—	0–0	5–0
3	Poland	6	2	3	1	8	6	+2	7		1–1	3–3	—	3–0
4	Turkey	6	0	0	6	1	14	−13	0		0–1	1–3	0–1	—

Source: UEFA
Rules for classification: Qualification tiebreakers

==== Group stage ====
Pos	Team	Pld	W	D	L	GF	GA	GD	Pts	Qualification
1	Sweden (H)	3	2	1	0	4	2	+2	5	Advance to knockout stage
2	Denmark	3	1	1	1	2	2	0	3	Advance to knockout stage
3	France	3	0	2	1	2	3	−1	2	
4	England	3	0	2	1	1	2	−1	2	

Source: UEFA
Rules for classification: Group stage tiebreakers
(H) Hosts
11 June 1992
20:15

Denmark	0–0	England
	Report

Malmö Stadion, Malmö
Attendance: 26,385
Referee: John Blankenstein (Netherlands)

14 June 1992
17:15

France	0–0	England
	Report

Malmö Stadion, Malmö
Attendance: 26,535
Referee: Sándor Puhl (Hungary)

17 June 1992
20:15

Sweden	2–1	England
J. Eriksson 51'; Brolin 82'	Report	Platt 4'

Råsunda Stadium, Solna
Attendance: 30,126
Referee: José Rosa dos Santos (Portugal)

=== UEFA Euro 1996: England ===
==== Group stage ====
Pos	Team	Pld	W	D	L	GF	GA	GD	Pts	Qualification
1	England (H)	3	2	1	0	7	2	+5	7	Advance to knockout stage
2	Netherlands	3	1	1	1	3	4	−1	4 (Note: Tied on head-to-head result (Netherlands 0–0 Scotland) and overall goal difference (−1). Overall goals for was used as the tiebreaker.)	Advance to knockout stage
3	Scotland	3	1	1	1	1	2	−1	4	
4	Switzerland	3	0	1	2	1	4	−3	1	

Source: UEFA
Rules for classification: Group stage tiebreakers
(H) Hosts
Notes:

Matches

8 June 1996
15:00

England	1–1	Switzerland
Shearer 23'	Report	Türkyilmaz 83' (pen.)

Wembley Stadium, London
Attendance: 76,567
Referee: Manuel Díaz Vega (Spain)

15 June 1996
15:00

Scotland	0–2	England
	Report	Shearer 53'; Gascoigne 79'

Wembley Stadium, London
Attendance: 76,864
Referee: Pierluigi Pairetto (Italy)

18 June 1996
19:30

Netherlands	1–4	England
Kluivert 78'	Report	Shearer 23' (pen.), 57'; Sheringham 51', 62'

Wembley Stadium, London
Attendance: 76,798
Referee: Gerd Grabher (Austria)

==== Knockout stage ====
Quarter-finals

22 June 1996
15:00

Spain	0–0 (a.e.t.)	England
	Report
Penalties
Hierro (penalty missed); Amor (penalty scored); Belsué (penalty scored); Nadal (penalty missed)	2–4	(penalty scored) Shearer; (penalty scored) Platt; (penalty scored) Pearce; (penalty scored) Gascoigne

Wembley Stadium, London
Attendance: 75,440
Referee: Marc Batta (France)

Semi-finals

26 June 1996
19:30

Germany	1–1 (a.e.t.)	England
Kuntz 16'	Report	Shearer 3'
Penalties
Häßler (penalty scored); Strunz (penalty scored); Reuter (penalty scored); Ziege (penalty scored); Kuntz (penalty scored); Möller (penalty scored)	6–5	(penalty scored) Shearer; (penalty scored) Platt; (penalty scored) Pearce; (penalty scored) Gascoigne; (penalty scored) Sheringham; (penalty missed) Southgate

Wembley Stadium, London
Attendance: 75,862
Referee: Sándor Puhl (Hungary)

=== UEFA Euro 2000: Belgium–Netherlands ===
==== Qualifying ====
Group stage

Pos	Team	Pld	W	D	L	GF	GA	GD	Pts	Qualification	(Sweden)	(England)	(Poland)	(Bulgaria)	(Luxembourg)
1	Sweden	8	7	1	0	10	1	+9	22	Qualify for final tournament	—	2–1	2–0	1–0	2–0
2	England	8	3	4	1	14	4	+10	13 (Note: Head-to-head points: England 4, Poland 1.)	Advance to play-offs	0–0	—	3–1	0–0	6–0
3	Poland	8	4	1	3	12	8	+4	13		0–1	0–0	—	2–0	3–0
4	Bulgaria	8	2	2	4	6	8	−2	8		0–1	1–1	0–3	—	3–0
5	Luxembourg	8	0	0	8	2	23	−21	0		0–1	0–3	2–3	0–2	—

Source: UEFA
Rules for classification: Qualification tiebreakers

==== Play-offs ====
Team 1	Agg.	Team 2	1st leg	2nd leg
Scotland	1–2	England	0–2	1–0
Israel	0–8	Denmark	0–5	0–3
Slovenia	3–2	Ukraine	2–1	1–1
Republic of Ireland	1–1 (a)	Turkey	1–1	0–0

==== Group stage ====
Pos	Team	Pld	W	D	L	GF	GA	GD	Pts	Qualification
1	Portugal	3	3	0	0	7	2	+5	9	Advance to knockout stage
2	Romania	3	1	1	1	4	4	0	4	Advance to knockout stage
3	England	3	1	0	2	5	6	−1	3	
4	Germany	3	0	1	2	1	5	−4	1	

Source: UEFA
Rules for classification: Group stage tiebreakers
12 June 2000
20:45

Portugal	3–2	England
Figo 22'; João Pinto 37'; Nuno Gomes 59'	Report	Scholes 3'; McManaman 18'

Philips Stadion, Eindhoven
Attendance: 31,500
Referee: Anders Frisk (Sweden)

17 June 2000
20:45

England	1–0	Germany
Shearer 53'	Report

Stade du Pays de Charleroi, Charleroi
Attendance: 29,000
Referee: Pierluigi Collina (Italy)

20 June 2000
20:45

England	2–3	Romania
Shearer 41' (pen.); Owen 45'	Report	Chivu 22'; Munteanu 48'; Ganea 89' (pen.)

Stade du Pays de Charleroi, Charleroi
Attendance: 30,000
Referee: Urs Meier (Switzerland)

=== UEFA Euro 2004: Portugal ===
==== Qualifying ====
Group stage

Pos	Team	Pld	W	D	L	GF	GA	GD	Pts	Qualification	(England)	(Turkey)	(Slovakia)	(North Macedonia)	(Liechtenstein)
1	England	8	6	2	0	14	5	+9	20	Qualify for final tournament	—	2–0	2–1	2–2	2–0
2	Turkey	8	6	1	1	17	5	+12	19	Advance to play-offs	0–0	—	3–0	3–2	5–0
3	Slovakia	8	3	1	4	11	9	+2	10		1–2	0–1	—	1–1	4–0
4	Macedonia	8	1	3	4	11	14	−3	6		1–2	1–2	0–2	—	3–1
5	Liechtenstein	8	0	1	7	2	22	−20	1		0–2	0–3	0–2	1–1	—

Source: UEFA
Rules for classification: Qualification tiebreakers

==== Group stage ====
Pos	Team	Pld	W	D	L	GF	GA	GD	Pts	Qualification
1	France	3	2	1	0	7	4	+3	7	Advance to knockout stage
2	England	3	2	0	1	8	4	+4	6	Advance to knockout stage
3	Croatia	3	0	2	1	4	6	−2	2	
4	Switzerland	3	0	1	2	1	6	−5	1	

Source: UEFA
Rules for classification: Group stage tiebreakers
13 June 2004
19:45

France	2–1	England
Zidane 90+1', 90+3' (pen.)	Report	Lampard 38'

Estádio da Luz, Lisbon
Attendance: 62,487
Referee: Markus Merk (Germany)

17 June 2004
17:00

England	3–0	Switzerland
Rooney 23', 75'; Gerrard 82'	Report

Estádio Cidade de Coimbra, Coimbra
Attendance: 28,214
Referee: Valentin Ivanov (Russia)

21 June 2004
19:45

Croatia	2–4	England
N. Kovač 5'; Tudor 73'	Report	Scholes 40'; Rooney 45+1', 68'; Lampard 79'

Estádio da Luz, Lisbon
Attendance: 57,047
Referee: Pierluigi Collina (Italy)

==== Knockout stage ====
Quarter-finals

24 June 2004
19:45

Portugal	2–2 (a.e.t.)	England
Postiga 83'; Rui Costa 110'	Report	Owen 3'; Lampard 115'
Penalties
Deco (penalty scored); Simão (penalty scored); Rui Costa (penalty missed); Ronaldo (penalty scored); Maniche (penalty scored); Postiga (penalty scored); Ricardo (penalty scored)	6–5	(penalty missed) Beckham; (penalty scored) Owen; (penalty scored) Lampard; (penalty scored) Terry; (penalty scored) Hargreaves; (penalty scored) A. Cole; (penalty missed) Vassell

Estádio da Luz, Lisbon
Attendance: 62,564
Referee: Urs Meier (Switzerland)

=== UEFA Euro 2012: Poland–Ukraine ===
==== Qualifying ====
Group stage

Pos	Team	Pld	W	D	L	GF	GA	GD	Pts	Qualification	(England)	(Montenegro)	(Switzerland)	(Wales)	(Bulgaria)
1	England	8	5	3	0	17	5	+12	18	Qualify for final tournament	—	0–0	2–2	1–0	4–0
2	Montenegro	8	3	3	2	7	7	0	12	Advance to play-offs	2–2	—	1–0	1–0	1–1
3	Switzerland	8	3	2	3	12	10	+2	11		1–3	2–0	—	4–1	3–1
4	Wales	8	3	0	5	6	10	−4	9		0–2	2–1	2–0	—	0–1
5	Bulgaria	8	1	2	5	3	13	−10	5		0–3	0–1	0–0	0–1	—

Source: UEFA
Rules for classification: Qualification tiebreakers

==== Group stage ====
Pos	Team	Pld	W	D	L	GF	GA	GD	Pts	Qualification
1	England	3	2	1	0	5	3	+2	7	Advance to knockout stage
2	France	3	1	1	1	3	3	0	4	Advance to knockout stage
3	Ukraine (H)	3	1	0	2	2	4	−2	3 (Note: Head-to-head result: Ukraine 2–1 Sweden.)	
4	Sweden	3	1	0	2	5	5	0	3	

Source: UEFA
Rules for classification: Group stage tiebreakers
(H) Hosts
Notes:
11 June 2012
19:00 EEST

France	1–1	England
Nasri 39'	Report	Lescott 30'

Donbas Arena, Donetsk
Attendance: 47,400
Referee: Nicola Rizzoli (Italy)

15 June 2012
22:00 EEST (Note: The match, originally scheduled for 21:45 local time, was delayed 15 minutes to prevent overlap with the other Group D match between Ukraine and France, which had been delayed due to rain.)

Sweden	2–3	England
Johnson 49' (o.g.); Mellberg 59'	Report	Carroll 23'; Walcott 64'; Welbeck 78'

Olympic Stadium, Kyiv
Attendance: 64,640
Referee: Damir Skomina (Slovenia)

19 June 2012
21:45 EEST

England	1–0	Ukraine
Rooney 48'	Report

Donbas Arena, Donetsk
Attendance: 48,700
Referee: Viktor Kassai (Hungary)

==== Knockout stage ====
Quarter-finals

24 June 2012
21:45 EEST

England	0–0 (a.e.t.)	Italy
	Report
Penalties
Gerrard (penalty scored); Rooney (penalty scored); Young (penalty missed); Cole (penalty missed)	2–4	(penalty scored) Balotelli; (penalty missed) Montolivo; (penalty scored) Pirlo; (penalty scored) Nocerino; (penalty scored) Diamanti

Olympic Stadium, Kyiv
Attendance: 64,340
Referee: Pedro Proença (Portugal)

=== UEFA Euro 2016: France ===
==== Qualifying ====
Group stage

Pos	Team	Pld	W	D	L	GF	GA	GD	Pts	Qualification	(England)	(Switzerland)	(Slovenia)	(Estonia)	(Lithuania)	(San Marino)
1	England	10	10	0	0	31	3	+28	30	Qualify for final tournament	—	2–0	3–1	2–0	4–0	5–0
2	Switzerland	10	7	0	3	24	8	+16	21	Qualify for final tournament	0–2	—	3–2	3–0	4–0	7–0
3	Slovenia	10	5	1	4	18	11	+7	16	Advance to play-offs	2–3	1–0	—	1–0	1–1	6–0
4	Estonia	10	3	1	6	4	9	−5	10 (Note: Tied on head-to-head results. Overall goal difference was used as the tiebreaker.)		0–1	0–1	1–0	—	1–0	2–0
5	Lithuania	10	3	1	6	7	18	−11	10		0–3	1–2	0–2	1–0	—	2–1
6	San Marino	10	0	1	9	1	36	−35	1		0–6	0–4	0–2	0–0	0–2	—

Source: UEFA
Rules for classification: Qualification tiebreakers

==== Group stage ====
Pos	Team	Pld	W	D	L	GF	GA	GD	Pts	Qualification
1	Wales	3	2	0	1	6	3	+3	6	Advance to knockout stage
2	England	3	1	2	0	3	2	+1	5	Advance to knockout stage
3	Slovakia	3	1	1	1	3	3	0	4	Advance to knockout stage
4	Russia	3	0	1	2	2	6	−4	1	

Source: UEFA
Rules for classification: Group stage tiebreakers
11 June 2016
21:00

England	1–1	Russia
Dier 73'	Report	V. Berezutski 90+2'

Stade Vélodrome, Marseille
Attendance: 62,343
Referee: Nicola Rizzoli (Italy)

16 June 2016
15:00

England	2–1	Wales
Vardy 56'; Sturridge 90+2'	Report	Bale 42'

Stade Bollaert-Delelis, Lens
Attendance: 34,033
Referee: Felix Brych (Germany)

20 June 2016
21:00

Slovakia	0–0	England
	Report

Stade Geoffroy-Guichard, Saint-Étienne
Attendance: 39,051
Referee: Carlos Velasco Carballo (Spain)

==== Knockout stage ====
Round of 16

27 June 2016
21:00

England	1–2	Iceland
Rooney 4' (pen.)	Report	R. Sigurðsson 6'; Sigþórsson 18'

Stade de Nice, Nice
Attendance: 33,901
Referee: Damir Skomina (Slovenia)

=== UEFA Euro 2020: Europe ===
==== Qualifying ====
Group stage

Pos	Team	Pld	W	D	L	GF	GA	GD	Pts	Qualification	(England)	(Czech Republic)	(Kosovo)	(Bulgaria)	(Montenegro)
1	England	8	7	0	1	37	6	+31	21	Qualify for final tournament	—	5–0	5–3	4–0	7–0
2	Czech Republic	8	5	0	3	13	11	+2	15	Qualify for final tournament	2–1	—	2–1	2–1	3–0
3	Kosovo	8	3	2	3	13	16	−3	11	Advance to play-offs via Nations League	0–4	2–1	—	1–1	2–0
4	Bulgaria	8	1	3	4	6	17	−11	6	Advance to play-offs via Nations League	0–6	1–0	2–3	—	1–1
5	Montenegro	8	0	3	5	3	22	−19	3		1–5	0–3	1–1	0–0	—

Source: UEFA
Rules for classification: Qualification tiebreakers

==== Group stage ====
Pos	Team	Pld	W	D	L	GF	GA	GD	Pts	Qualification
1	England (H)	3	2	1	0	2	0	+2	7	Advance to knockout stage
2	Croatia	3	1	1	1	4	3	+1	4 (Note: Tied on head-to-head result (Croatia 1–1 Czech Republic) and overall goal difference (+1). Overall goals for was used as the tiebreaker.)	Advance to knockout stage
3	Czech Republic	3	1	1	1	3	2	+1	4	Advance to knockout stage
4	Scotland (H)	3	0	1	2	1	5	−4	1	

Source: UEFA
Rules for classification: Group stage tiebreakers
(H) Hosts
Notes:
13 June 2021
15:00 (14:00 UTC+1)

England	1–0	Croatia
Sterling 57'	Report

Wembley Stadium, London
Attendance: 18,497
Referee: Daniele Orsato (Italy)

18 June 2021
21:00 (20:00 UTC+1)

England	0–0	Scotland
	Report

Wembley Stadium, London
Attendance: 20,306
Referee: Antonio Mateu Lahoz (Spain)

22 June 2021
21:00 (20:00 UTC+1)

Czech Republic	0–1	England
	Report	Sterling 12'

Wembley Stadium, London
Attendance: 19,104
Referee: Artur Soares Dias (Portugal)

==== Knockout stage ====
Round of 16

29 June 2021
18:00 (17:00 UTC+1)

England	2–0	Germany
Sterling 75'; Kane 86'	Report

Wembley Stadium, London
Attendance: 41,973
Referee: Danny Makkelie (Netherlands)

Quarter-finals

3 July 2021
21:00

Ukraine	0–4	England
	Report	Kane 4', 50'; Maguire 46'; J. Henderson 63'

Stadio Olimpico, Rome
Attendance: 11,880
Referee: Felix Brych (Germany)

Semi-finals

7 July 2021
21:00 (20:00 UTC+1)

England	2–1 (a.e.t.)	Denmark
Kjær 39' (o.g.); Kane 104'	Report	Damsgaard 30'

Wembley Stadium, London
Attendance: 64,950
Referee: Danny Makkelie (Netherlands)

Final

11 July 2021
21:00 (20:00 UTC+1)

Italy	1–1 (a.e.t.)	England
Bonucci 67'	Report	Shaw 2'
Penalties
Berardi (penalty scored); Belotti (penalty missed); Bonucci (penalty scored); Bernardeschi (penalty scored); Jorginho (penalty missed)	3–2	(penalty scored) Kane; (penalty scored) Maguire; (penalty missed) Rashford; (penalty missed) Sancho; (penalty missed) Saka

Wembley Stadium, London
Attendance: 67,173
Referee: Björn Kuipers (Netherlands)

=== UEFA Euro 2024: Germany ===
As the competition ran during the 2024 general election, the Football Association contacted players to remind them about arranging proxy votes or postal votes.

==== Qualifying ====
Group stage

Pos	Team	Pld	W	D	L	GF	GA	GD	Pts	Qualification	(England)	(Italy)	(Ukraine)	(North Macedonia)	(Malta)
1	England	8	6	2	0	22	4	+18	20	Qualify for final tournament	—	3–1	2–0	7–0	2–0
2	Italy	8	4	2	2	16	9	+7	14 (Note: Head-to-head points: Italy 4, Ukraine 1.)	Qualify for final tournament	1–2	—	2–1	5–2	4–0
3	Ukraine	8	4	2	2	11	8	+3	14	Advance to play-offs via Nations League	1–1	0–0	—	2–0	1–0
4	North Macedonia	8	2	2	4	10	20	−10	8		1–1	1–1	2–3	—	2–1
5	Malta	8	0	0	8	2	20	−18	0		0–4	0–2	1–3	0–2	—

Source: UEFA
Rules for classification: Qualification tiebreakers

==== Group stage ====
Pos	Team	Pld	W	D	L	GF	GA	GD	Pts	Qualification
1	England	3	1	2	0	2	1	+1	5	Advance to knockout stage
2	Denmark	3	0	3	0	2	2	0	3 (Note: Tied on head-to-head result (Slovenia 1–1 Denmark), overall goal difference and overall goals scored. Disciplinary points: Denmark −6, Slovenia −7.)	Advance to knockout stage
3	Slovenia	3	0	3	0	2	2	0	3	Advance to knockout stage
4	Serbia	3	0	2	1	1	2	−1	2	

Source: UEFA
Notes:
16 June 2024
21:00

Serbia	0–1	England
	Report	Bellingham 13'

Arena AufSchalke, Gelsenkirchen
Attendance: 48,953
Referee: Daniele Orsato (Italy)

20 June 2024
18:00

Denmark	1–1	England
Hjulmand 34'	Report	Kane 18'

Waldstadion, Frankfurt
Attendance: 46,177
Referee: Artur Soares Dias (Portugal)

25 June 2024
21:00

England	0–0	Slovenia
	Report

RheinEnergieStadion, Cologne
Attendance: 41,536
Referee: Clément Turpin (France)

==== Knockout stage ====
Round of 16

30 June 2024
18:00

England	2–1 (a.e.t.)	Slovakia
Bellingham 90+5'; Kane 91'	Report	Schranz 25'

Arena AufSchalke, Gelsenkirchen
Attendance: 47,244
Referee: Halil Umut Meler (Turkey)

Quarter-finals

6 July 2024
18:00

England	1–1 (a.e.t.)	Switzerland
Saka 80'	Report	Embolo 75'
Penalties
Palmer (penalty scored); Bellingham (penalty scored); Saka (penalty scored); Toney (penalty scored); Alexander-Arnold (penalty scored)	5–3	(penalty missed) Akanji; (penalty scored) Schär; (penalty scored) Shaqiri; (penalty scored) Amdouni

Merkur Spiel-Arena, Düsseldorf
Attendance: 46,907
Referee: Daniele Orsato (Italy)

Semi-finals

10 July 2024
21:00

Netherlands	1–2	England
Simons 7'	Report	Kane 18' (pen.); Watkins 90'

Westfalenstadion, Dortmund
Attendance: 60,926
Referee: Felix Zwayer (Germany)

Final

14 July 2024
21:00

Spain	2–1	England
Williams 47'; Oyarzabal 86'	Report	Palmer 73'

Olympiastadion, Berlin
Attendance: 65,600
Referee: François Letexier (France)

== Player records ==
=== Most appearances ===
Rank	Player	Matches	Years
1	Harry Kane	18	2016, 2020, 2024
2	Kyle Walker	16	2016, 2020, 2024
3	Jordan Pickford	14	2020, 2024
3	Declan Rice	14	2020, 2024
3	John Stones	14	2020, 2024
6	Gary Neville	11	1996, 2000, 2004
6	Bukayo Saka	11	2020, 2024
6	Kieran Trippier	11	2020, 2024
9	Jude Bellingham	10	2020, 2024
9	Phil Foden	10	2020, 2024
9	Wayne Rooney	10	2004, 2012, 2016
9	Raheem Sterling	10	2016, 2020

=== Top goalscorers ===
Rank	Player	Goals	Years (goals)
1	Harry Kane	7	2020 (4), 2024 (3)
1	Alan Shearer	7	1996 (5), 2000 (2)
3	Wayne Rooney	6	2004 (4), 2012, 2016
4	Frank Lampard	3	2004 (3)
4	Raheem Sterling	3	2020 (3)
6	Jude Bellingham	2	2024 (2)
6	Michael Owen	2	2000, 2004
6	Paul Scholes	2	2000, 2004
6	Teddy Sheringham	2	1996 (2)

=== Goals by tournament ===
European Championship	Goalscorer(s)
1968	Bobby Charlton, Geoff Hurst
1980	Trevor Brooking, Ray Wilkins, Tony Woodcock
1988	Tony Adams, Bryan Robson
1992	David Platt
1996	Alan Shearer (5), Teddy Sheringham (2), Paul Gascoigne
2000	Alan Shearer (2), Steve McManaman, Michael Owen, Paul Scholes
2004	Wayne Rooney (4), Frank Lampard (3), Steven Gerrard, Michael Owen, Paul Scholes
2012	Andy Carroll, Joleon Lescott, Wayne Rooney, Theo Walcott, Danny Welbeck
2016	Eric Dier, Wayne Rooney, Daniel Sturridge, Jamie Vardy
2020	Harry Kane (4), Raheem Sterling (3), Jordan Henderson, Harry Maguire, Luke Shaw, own goal
2024	Harry Kane (3), Jude Bellingham (2), Bukayo Saka, Ollie Watkins, Cole Palmer

== See also ==
- England at the FIFA World Cup
- List of England national football team World Cup and European Championship squads
