= UEFA Euro 2020 Group D =

Football tournament group stage

Group D of UEFA Euro 2020 took place from 13 to 22 June 2021 in Glasgow's Hampden Park and London's Wembley Stadium. The group contained host nations England and Scotland, as well as Croatia and the Czech Republic. The head-to-head match between the hosts took place at England's Wembley Stadium.

== Teams ==
Draw position	Team	Pot	Method of qualification	Date of qualification	Finals appearance	Last appearance	Previous best performance	Qualifying Rankings November 2019 (Note: The European Qualifiers overall rankings from November 2019 were used for seeding for the final draw.)	FIFA Rankings May 2021
D1	England (host)	1	Group A winner	14 November 2019	10th	2016	Third place (1968), Semi-finals (1996)	3	4
D2	Croatia	2	Group E winner	16 November 2019	6th	2016	Quarter-finals (1996, 2008)	10	14
D3	Scotland (host)	4	Play-off Path C winner	12 November 2020	3rd	1996	Group stage (1992, 1996)	29	44
D4	Czech Republic (Note: From 1960 to 1980, the Czech Republic competed as Czechoslovakia.)	3	Group A runner-up	14 November 2019	10th	2016	Winners (1976)	18	40

== Standings ==
Pos	Team	Pld	W	D	L	GF	GA	GD	Pts	Qualification
1	England (H)	3	2	1	0	2	0	+2	7	Advance to knockout stage
2	Croatia	3	1	1	1	4	3	+1	4 (Note: Tied on head-to-head result (Croatia 1–1 Czech Republic) and overall goal difference (+1). Overall goals for was used as the tiebreaker.)	Advance to knockout stage
3	Czech Republic	3	1	1	1	3	2	+1	4	Advance to knockout stage
4	Scotland (H)	3	0	1	2	1	5	−4	1	

Source: UEFA
Rules for classification: Group stage tiebreakers
(H) Hosts
Notes:

In the round of 16,

- The winner of Group D, England, advanced to play the runner-up of Group F, Germany.
- The runner-up of Group D, Croatia, advanced to play the runner-up of Group E, Spain.
- The third-placed team of Group D, the Czech Republic, advanced as one of the four best third-placed teams to play the winner of Group C, the Netherlands.

== Matches ==
=== England vs Croatia ===
England's win and Croatia's loss were their respective firsts in their opening match of a European Championship. England substitute Jude Bellingham became the youngest English player at 17 years and 349 days to play in a European Championship finals match when he came on to replace Harry Kane in the 82nd minute.

13 June 2021
15:00 (14:00 UTC+1)

England	1–0	Croatia
Sterling 57'	Report

Wembley Stadium, London
Attendance: 18,497
Referee: Daniele Orsato (Italy)

England	Croatia

GK	1	Jordan Pickford
RB	2	Kyle Walker
CB	5	John Stones
CB	15	Tyrone Mings
LB	12	Kieran Trippier
CM	14	Kalvin Phillips
CM	4	Declan Rice
RW	10	Raheem Sterling		(substituted off) 90+2'
AM	19	Mason Mount
LW	20	Phil Foden	(yellow card) 64'	(substituted off) 71'
CF	9	Harry Kane (c)		(substituted off) 82'
Substitutions:
FW	11	Marcus Rashford		(substituted on) 71'
MF	26	Jude Bellingham		(substituted on) 82'
FW	18	Dominic Calvert-Lewin		(substituted on) 90+2'
Manager:
Gareth Southgate

GK	1	Dominik Livaković
RB	2	Šime Vrsaljko
CB	21	Domagoj Vida
CB	5	Duje Ćaleta-Car	(yellow card) 42'
LB	25	Joško Gvardiol
DM	11	Marcelo Brozović	(yellow card) 66'	(substituted off) 70'
CM	10	Luka Modrić (c)
CM	8	Mateo Kovačić	(yellow card) 48'	(substituted off) 85'
RW	9	Andrej Kramarić		(substituted off) 70'
LW	4	Ivan Perišić
CF	17	Ante Rebić		(substituted off) 78'
Substitutions:
MF	13	Nikola Vlašić		(substituted on) 70'
FW	7	Josip Brekalo		(substituted on) 70'
FW	20	Bruno Petković		(substituted on) 78'
MF	15	Mario Pašalić		(substituted on) 85'
Manager:
Zlatko Dalić

Man of the Match:
Raheem Sterling (England)

Assistant referees:
Alessandro Giallatini (Italy)
Fabiano Preti (Italy)
Fourth official:
Björn Kuipers (Netherlands)
Reserve assistant referee:
Sander van Roekel (Netherlands)
Video assistant referee:
Massimiliano Irrati (Italy)
Assistant video assistant referees:
João Pinheiro (Portugal)
Filippo Meli (Italy)
Paolo Valeri (Italy)

=== Scotland vs Czech Republic ===
14 June 2021
15:00 (14:00 UTC+1)

Scotland	0–2	Czech Republic
	Report	Schick 42', 52'

Hampden Park, Glasgow
Attendance: 9,847
Referee: Daniel Siebert (Germany)

Scotland	Czech Republic

GK	1	David Marshall
CB	5	Grant Hanley
CB	16	Liam Cooper
CB	24	Jack Hendry	(substituted off) 67'
CM	17	Stuart Armstrong	(substituted off) 67'
CM	7	John McGinn
CM	4	Scott McTominay
RW	2	Stephen O'Donnell	(substituted off) 79'
LW	3	Andy Robertson (c)
CF	9	Lyndon Dykes	(substituted off) 79'
CF	11	Ryan Christie	(substituted off) 46'
Substitutions:
FW	10	Ché Adams	(substituted on) 46'
MF	8	Callum McGregor	(substituted on) 67'
MF	20	Ryan Fraser	(substituted on) 67'
MF	25	James Forrest	(substituted on) 79'
FW	19	Kevin Nisbet	(substituted on) 79'
Manager:
Steve Clarke

GK	1	Tomáš Vaclík
RB	5	Vladimír Coufal
CB	3	Ondřej Čelůstka
CB	6	Tomáš Kalas
LB	18	Jan Bořil
CM	15	Tomáš Souček
CM	21	Alex Král	(substituted off) 67'
RW	12	Lukáš Masopust	(substituted off) 72'
AM	8	Vladimír Darida (c)	(substituted off) 87'
LW	14	Jakub Jankto	(substituted off) 72'
CF	10	Patrik Schick	(substituted off) 87'
Substitutions:
DF	9	Tomáš Holeš	(substituted on) 67'
FW	19	Adam Hložek	(substituted on) 72'
FW	20	Matěj Vydra	(substituted on) 72'
MF	13	Petr Ševčík	(substituted on) 87'
FW	11	Michael Krmenčík	(substituted on) 87'
Manager:
Jaroslav Šilhavý

Man of the Match:
Patrik Schick (Czech Republic)

Assistant referees:
Jan Seidel (Germany)
Rafael Foltyn (Germany)
Fourth official:
Georgi Kabakov (Bulgaria)
Reserve assistant referee:
Martin Margaritov (Bulgaria)
Video assistant referee:
Marco Fritz (Germany)
Assistant video assistant referees:
Christian Dingert (Germany)
Christian Gittelmann (Germany)
Alejandro Hernández Hernández (Spain)

=== Croatia vs Czech Republic ===
18 June 2021
18:00 (17:00 UTC+1)

Croatia	1–1	Czech Republic
Perišić 47'	Report	Schick 37' (pen.)

Hampden Park, Glasgow
Attendance: 5,607
Referee: Carlos del Cerro Grande (Spain)

Croatia	Czech Republic

GK	1	Dominik Livaković
RB	2	Šime Vrsaljko
CB	6	Dejan Lovren	(yellow card) 35'
CB	21	Domagoj Vida
LB	25	Joško Gvardiol
CM	10	Luka Modrić (c)
CM	8	Mateo Kovačić		(substituted off) 87'
RW	4	Ivan Perišić
AM	9	Andrej Kramarić		(substituted off) 62'
LW	7	Josip Brekalo		(substituted off) 46'
CF	17	Ante Rebić		(substituted off) 46'
Substitutions:
FW	20	Bruno Petković		(substituted on) 46'
MF	26	Luka Ivanušec		(substituted on) 46'
MF	13	Nikola Vlašić		(substituted on) 62'
MF	11	Marcelo Brozović		(substituted on) 87'
Manager:
Zlatko Dalić

GK	1	Tomáš Vaclík
RB	5	Vladimír Coufal
CB	6	Tomáš Kalas
CB	3	Ondřej Čelůstka
LB	18	Jan Bořil	(yellow card) 82'
CM	9	Tomáš Holeš		(substituted off) 63'
CM	15	Tomáš Souček
RW	12	Lukáš Masopust	(yellow card) 50'	(substituted off) 63'
AM	8	Vladimír Darida (c)		(substituted off) 87'
LW	14	Jakub Jankto		(substituted off) 74'
CF	10	Patrik Schick		(substituted off) 74'
Substitutions:
FW	19	Adam Hložek	(yellow card) 90+3'	(substituted on) 63'
MF	21	Alex Král		(substituted on) 63'
MF	13	Petr Ševčík		(substituted on) 74'
FW	11	Michael Krmenčík		(substituted on) 74'
MF	7	Antonín Barák		(substituted on) 87'
Manager:
Jaroslav Šilhavý

Man of the Match:
Luka Modrić (Croatia)

Assistant referees:
Juan Carlos Yuste Jiménez (Spain)
Roberto Alonso Fernández (Spain)
Fourth official:
Sandro Schärer (Switzerland)
Reserve assistant referee:
Stéphane De Almeida (Switzerland)
Video assistant referee:
Juan Martínez Munuera (Spain)
Assistant video assistant referees:
Marco Di Bello (Italy)
Íñigo Prieto López de Cerain (Spain)
Massimiliano Irrati (Italy)

=== England vs Scotland ===
18 June 2021
21:00 (20:00 UTC+1)

England	0–0	Scotland
	Report

Wembley Stadium, London
Attendance: 20,306
Referee: Antonio Mateu Lahoz (Spain)

England	Scotland

GK	1	Jordan Pickford
RB	24	Reece James
CB	5	John Stones
CB	15	Tyrone Mings
LB	3	Luke Shaw
CM	4	Declan Rice
CM	14	Kalvin Phillips
RW	20	Phil Foden	(substituted off) 63'
AM	19	Mason Mount
LW	10	Raheem Sterling
CF	9	Harry Kane (c)	(substituted off) 74'
Substitutions:
MF	7	Jack Grealish	(substituted on) 63'
FW	11	Marcus Rashford	(substituted on) 74'
Manager:
Gareth Southgate

GK	1	David Marshall
CB	4	Scott McTominay
CB	5	Grant Hanley
CB	6	Kieran Tierney
DM	23	Billy Gilmour		(substituted off) 76'
RM	2	Stephen O'Donnell	(yellow card) 87'
CM	7	John McGinn	(yellow card) 15'
CM	8	Callum McGregor
LM	3	Andy Robertson (c)
CF	9	Lyndon Dykes
CF	10	Ché Adams		(substituted off) 86'
Substitutions:
MF	17	Stuart Armstrong		(substituted on) 76'
FW	19	Kevin Nisbet		(substituted on) 86'
Manager:
Steve Clarke

Man of the Match:
Billy Gilmour (Scotland)

Assistant referees:
Pau Cebrián Devís (Spain)
Roberto Díaz Pérez del Palomar (Spain)
Fourth official:
Cüneyt Çakır (Turkey)
Reserve assistant referee:
Bahattin Duran (Turkey)
Video assistant referee:
Alejandro Hernández Hernández (Spain)
Assistant video assistant referees:
José María Sánchez Martínez (Spain)
Filippo Meli (Italy)
Paolo Valeri (Italy)

=== Croatia vs Scotland ===
22 June 2021
21:00 (20:00 UTC+1)

Croatia	3–1	Scotland
Vlašić 17'; Modrić 62'; Perišić 77'	Report	McGregor 42'

Hampden Park, Glasgow
Attendance: 9,896
Referee: Fernando Rapallini (Argentina)

Croatia	Scotland

GK	1	Dominik Livaković
RB	22	Josip Juranović
CB	6	Dejan Lovren	(yellow card) 26'
CB	21	Domagoj Vida
LB	25	Joško Gvardiol		(substituted off) 70'
CM	8	Mateo Kovačić
CM	11	Marcelo Brozović
RW	4	Ivan Perišić		(substituted off) 81'
AM	10	Luka Modrić (c)
LW	13	Nikola Vlašić		(substituted off) 76'
CF	20	Bruno Petković		(substituted off) 70'
Substitutions:
FW	9	Andrej Kramarić		(substituted on) 70'
DF	3	Borna Barišić		(substituted on) 70'
MF	26	Luka Ivanušec		(substituted on) 76'
FW	17	Ante Rebić		(substituted on) 81'
Manager:
Zlatko Dalić

GK	1	David Marshall
CB	4	Scott McTominay
CB	5	Grant Hanley		(substituted off) 33'
CB	6	Kieran Tierney
RWB	2	Stephen O'Donnell		(substituted off) 84'
LWB	3	Andy Robertson (c)
DM	7	John McGinn
CM	17	Stuart Armstrong		(substituted off) 70'
CM	8	Callum McGregor
CF	9	Lyndon Dykes
CF	10	Ché Adams		(substituted off) 84'
Substitutions:
DF	26	Scott McKenna	(yellow card) 34'	(substituted on) 33'
MF	20	Ryan Fraser		(substituted on) 70'
FW	19	Kevin Nisbet		(substituted on) 84'
DF	22	Nathan Patterson		(substituted on) 84'
Manager:
Steve Clarke

Man of the Match:
Nikola Vlašić (Croatia)

Assistant referees:
Juan Pablo Belatti (Argentina)
Diego Bonfá (Argentina)
Fourth official:
Bartosz Frankowski (Poland)
Reserve assistant referee:
Marcin Boniek (Poland)
Video assistant referee:
Alejandro Hernández Hernández (Spain)
Assistant video assistant referees:
José María Sánchez Martínez (Spain)
Íñigo Prieto López de Cerain (Spain)
Juan Martínez Munuera (Spain)

=== Czech Republic vs England ===
22 June 2021
21:00 (20:00 UTC+1)

Czech Republic	0–1	England
	Report	Sterling 12'

Wembley Stadium, London
Attendance: 19,104
Referee: Artur Soares Dias (Portugal)

Czech Republic	England

GK	1	Tomáš Vaclík
RB	5	Vladimír Coufal
CB	3	Ondřej Čelůstka
CB	6	Tomáš Kalas
LB	18	Jan Bořil	(yellow card) 61'
CM	9	Tomáš Holeš		(substituted off) 84'
CM	15	Tomáš Souček
RW	12	Lukáš Masopust		(substituted off) 64'
AM	8	Vladimír Darida (c)		(substituted off) 64'
LW	14	Jakub Jankto		(substituted off) 46'
CF	10	Patrik Schick		(substituted off) 75'
Substitutions:
MF	13	Petr Ševčík		(substituted on) 46'
MF	21	Alex Král		(substituted on) 64'
FW	19	Adam Hložek		(substituted on) 64'
FW	24	Tomáš Pekhart		(substituted on) 75'
FW	20	Matěj Vydra		(substituted on) 84'
Manager:
Jaroslav Šilhavý

GK	1	Jordan Pickford
RB	2	Kyle Walker
CB	5	John Stones	(substituted off) 79'
CB	6	Harry Maguire
LB	3	Luke Shaw
CM	14	Kalvin Phillips
CM	4	Declan Rice	(substituted off) 46'
RW	25	Bukayo Saka	(substituted off) 84'
AM	7	Jack Grealish	(substituted off) 67'
LW	10	Raheem Sterling	(substituted off) 67'
CF	9	Harry Kane (c)
Substitutions:
MF	8	Jordan Henderson	(substituted on) 46'
FW	11	Marcus Rashford	(substituted on) 67'
MF	26	Jude Bellingham	(substituted on) 67'
DF	15	Tyrone Mings	(substituted on) 79'
MF	17	Jadon Sancho	(substituted on) 84'
Manager:
Gareth Southgate

Man of the Match:
Bukayo Saka (England)

Assistant referees:
Rui Tavares (Portugal)
Paulo Soares (Portugal)
Fourth official:
Srđan Jovanović (Serbia)
Reserve assistant referee:
Uroš Stojković (Serbia)
Video assistant referee:
João Pinheiro (Portugal)
Assistant video assistant referees:
Paolo Valeri (Italy)
Filippo Meli (Italy)
Massimiliano Irrati (Italy)

== Discipline ==
Fair play points were to be used as a tiebreaker if the head-to-head and overall records of teams were tied (and if a penalty shoot-out was not applicable as a tiebreaker). These were calculated based on yellow and red cards received in all group matches as follows:

- yellow card = 1 point
- red card as a result of two yellow cards = 3 points
- direct red card = 3 points
- yellow card followed by direct red card = 4 points

Only one of the above deductions was applied to a player in a single match.

Team	Match 1				Match 2				Match 3				Points
Team	Booked	(yellow card) (yellow-red card)	Sent off (straight red)	(yellow card) (red card)	Booked	(yellow card) (yellow-red card)	Sent off (straight red)	(yellow card) (red card)	Booked	(yellow card) (yellow-red card)	Sent off (straight red)	(yellow card) (red card)	Points
England	1												−1
Scotland					2				1				−3
Czech Republic					3				1				−4
Croatia	3				1				1				−5

== See also ==
- Croatia at the UEFA European Championship
- Czech Republic at the UEFA European Championship
- England at the UEFA European Championship
- Scotland at the UEFA European Championship
