= Andy Roxburgh =

Scottish footballer and manager (born 1943)

Andy Roxburgh OBE
Personal information
- Full name: Andrew Roxburgh
- Date of birth: 5 August 1943 (age 83)
- Place of birth: Glasgow, Scotland
- Position: Forward

Senior career*
Years	Team	Apps	(Gls)
1961–1963	Queen's Park	19	(10)
1963–1965	East Stirlingshire	33	(11)
1965–1969	Partick Thistle	49	(19)
1969–1972	Falkirk	56	(26)
1973–1975	Clydebank	44	(12)
Total		201	(78)

Managerial career
- 1975–1986: Scotland U-16, U-18, U-21
- 1986–1993: Scotland
- 1987–1990: Scotland B
- * Club domestic league appearances and goals

Andrew Roxburgh OBE (born 5 August 1943) is a Scottish former football player and manager currently serving as an administrator. Roxburgh's entire professional playing career was spent in the Scottish Football League. After retiring as a player, he was appointed as the Scottish Football Association's first Director of Coaching. He achieved success with the national youth teams, winning the 1982 UEFA European Under-18 Football Championship. He spent many happy years as a senior Primary Teacher at Carolside School in Clarkston, Glasgow and was very much respected for his devotion to teaching.

Roxburgh was appointed Scotland manager in 1986 and achieved qualification for two major tournaments, the 1990 FIFA World Cup and UEFA Euro 1992. He resigned as Scotland manager in 1993 after failing to qualify for the 1994 FIFA World Cup. Roxburgh was appointed UEFA technical director in 1994 and held this position until accepting a role as sporting director for American club New York Red Bulls from 2012 to 2014.

He currently serves as a Technical Director with the Asian Football Confederation.

== Playing career ==
Roxburgh attended Bellahouston Academy, where he was selected for the first team at just 15 years of age. He played for Glasgow Schools and was a schoolboy and youth internationalist. In 1961, he scored the only goal in a schoolboy international against England Schools at Celtic Park.

From 1961 to 1963 Roxburgh played for Queen's Park, where he won the Scottish Amateur Cup and was capped by the Scottish national amateur team.

Roxburgh then moved to East Stirlingshire, where he played the 1964–65 season, before arriving at First Division club Partick Thistle, where he was to stay until the end of the 1968–69 season. In 1966, 25-year-old Roxburgh qualified as a Scottish Football Association coach.

Falkirk then signed Roxburgh, where he teamed up in attack with Alex Ferguson. At the end of the 1969–70 season, Falkirk were crowned Second Division champions and promoted to the First Division. Roxburgh remained at Falkirk until the end of the 1971–72 season.

Roxburgh finished his top flight playing career at Clydebank, where he was player-coach from 1973 to 1975. During the latter part of his professional playing career, Roxburgh (a physical education graduate), was also employed as a primary school headteacher.

== Scottish Football Association ==
Roxburgh was appointed as the Scottish Football Association's first Director of Coaching in 1975. He led the player and coach development work in Scotland for over 18 years – coaches such as José Mourinho studied under Roxburgh and he also helped to develop talents such as Paul McStay.

This appointment meant that Roxburgh also coached the Scotland youth teams from Under-21 level down. He was in charge of the Scotland Under-19 side that won the 1982 UEFA European Under-18 Football Championship, beating Czechoslovakia 3–1 in the final, played in Helsinki. In addition, under Roxburgh's tenure Scotland reached the semi-finals at the 1978 UEFA European Under-18 Championship and was a group winner in the 1983 FIFA World Youth Championship final round.

After the Scotland senior manager Jock Stein collapsed and died at the end of a 1–1 draw in a 1986 FIFA World Cup qualification match against Wales, Alex Ferguson was appointed as the team manager and guided Scotland to the 1986 World Cup by winning a playoff against Australia. Scotland failed to progress beyond the group stage of the World Cup and Ferguson rejected the offer of staying on as Scotland manager afterwards. Roxburgh was subsequently named as the new Scotland manager on 16 July 1986, ahead of more experienced and better known candidates such as Billy McNeill, Jim McLean, Kenny Dalglish and Tommy Docherty. Roxburgh would remain in the role for more than seven years.

Scotland failed to qualify for UEFA Euro 1988, but Roxburgh then guided the team to qualification for the 1990 FIFA World Cup. Scotland defeated Argentina in a pre-tournament friendly, but were eliminated in the group stage with one win (against Sweden) and two losses.

The team then qualified for UEFA Euro 1992, the first time Scotland had qualified for a European championship finals. Once more they lost two and won one of their group matches at the tournament and were eliminated. Roxburgh resigned in September 1993, following 61 matches in charge, after failing to achieve qualification for the 1994 FIFA World Cup. He was succeeded by his assistant, Craig Brown.

== UEFA ==
Roxburgh was appointed as UEFA's first technical director in 1994. He held this position until the end of his contract in 2012. During his time at UEFA, Roxburgh set up the framework for the UEFA Convention on the Mutual Recognition of Coaching Qualifications, which now includes all 55 UEFA member associations.

Roxburgh also initiated the UEFA Grassroots Charter to stimulate the UEFA member associations to further invest in the basis of the game and to acknowledge the importance of healthy grassroots. As part of the UEFA administration, Roxburgh was a member of the board of directors, chaired the JIRA and Grassroots panels, and was responsible for UEFA's youth competitions, refereeing department, and the women's football, futsal, and medical units. In addition, he also led UEFA's elite conferences, courses, and forums for national coaches, UEFA Champions League coaches, coach educators, youth coaches, women's football coaches, grassroots leaders, futsal coaches, and team doctors.

== FIFA ==
Roxburgh has worked with FIFA, as a member of its Technical Committee, as a FIFA instructor, and as a member of the Technical Study Group at six FIFA World Cups ('86, '94, '98, '02, '06, '10).

== Honours ==
- SFWA Manager of the Year: 1989–90
- Officer of the Order of the British Empire (OBE) for services to association football – 1993.
- National Playing Fields Association, MacRobert Thistle Award for his outstanding contribution to football – 1990
- Tartan Special Manager of the Month – November 1989
