= 1987–88 PSV Eindhoven season =

PSV Eindhoven
1987–88 season
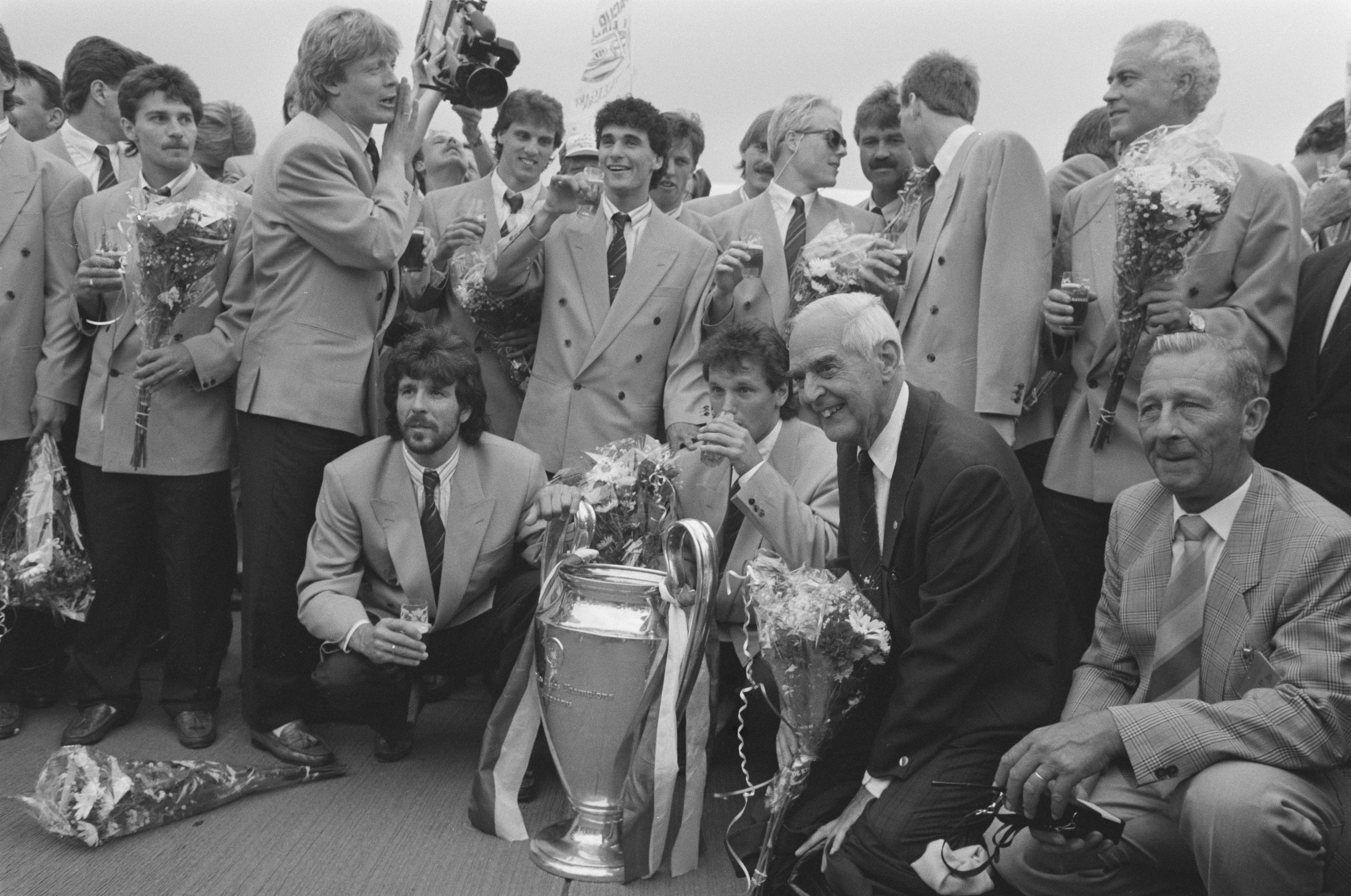
- PSV Eindhoven players celebrating winning the 1988 European Cup Final
- Manager: Guus Hiddink
- Stadium: Philips Stadion
- Eredivisie: 1st
- KNVB Cup: Winners
- European Cup: Winners
- Top goalscorer: Wim Kieft (29)
- Highest home attendance: 26,500
- Average home league attendance: 21,453
Home colours	Away colours

During the 1987–88 Dutch football season, PSV Eindhoven competed in the Eredivisie.

== Season summary ==
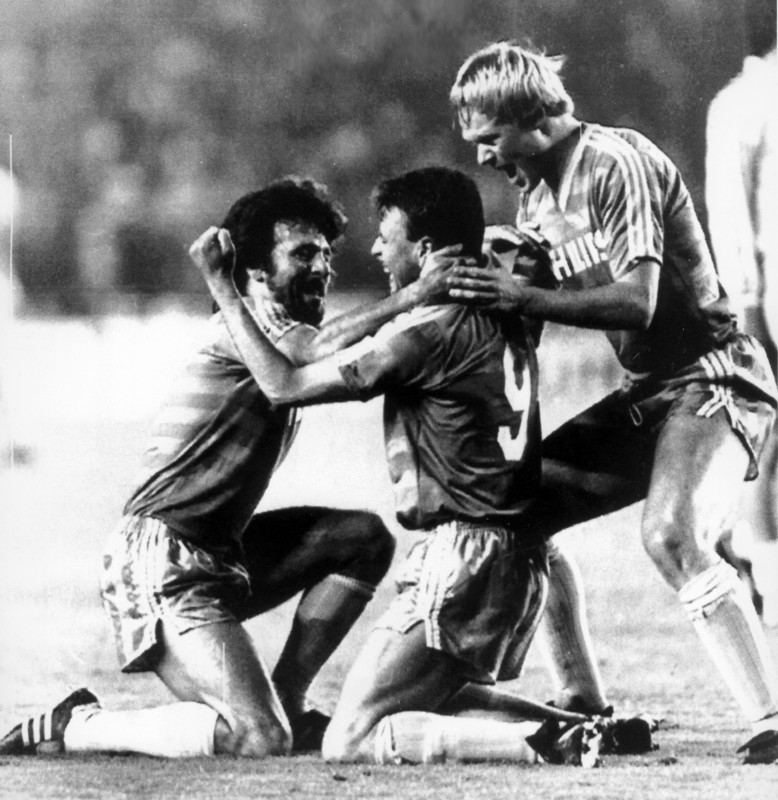
Eric Gerets, Edward Linskens and Ronald Koeman celebrating the equalizer in the semi-final against Real Madrid at the Santiago Bernabéu Stadium

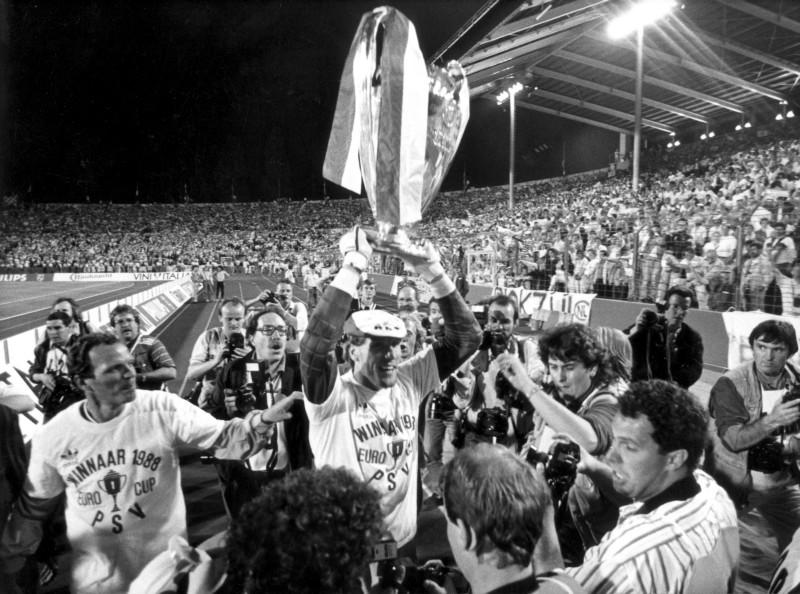
Hans van Breukelen (center) and Willy van de Kerkhof (left) celebrating with the European Cup after the match in Stuttgart

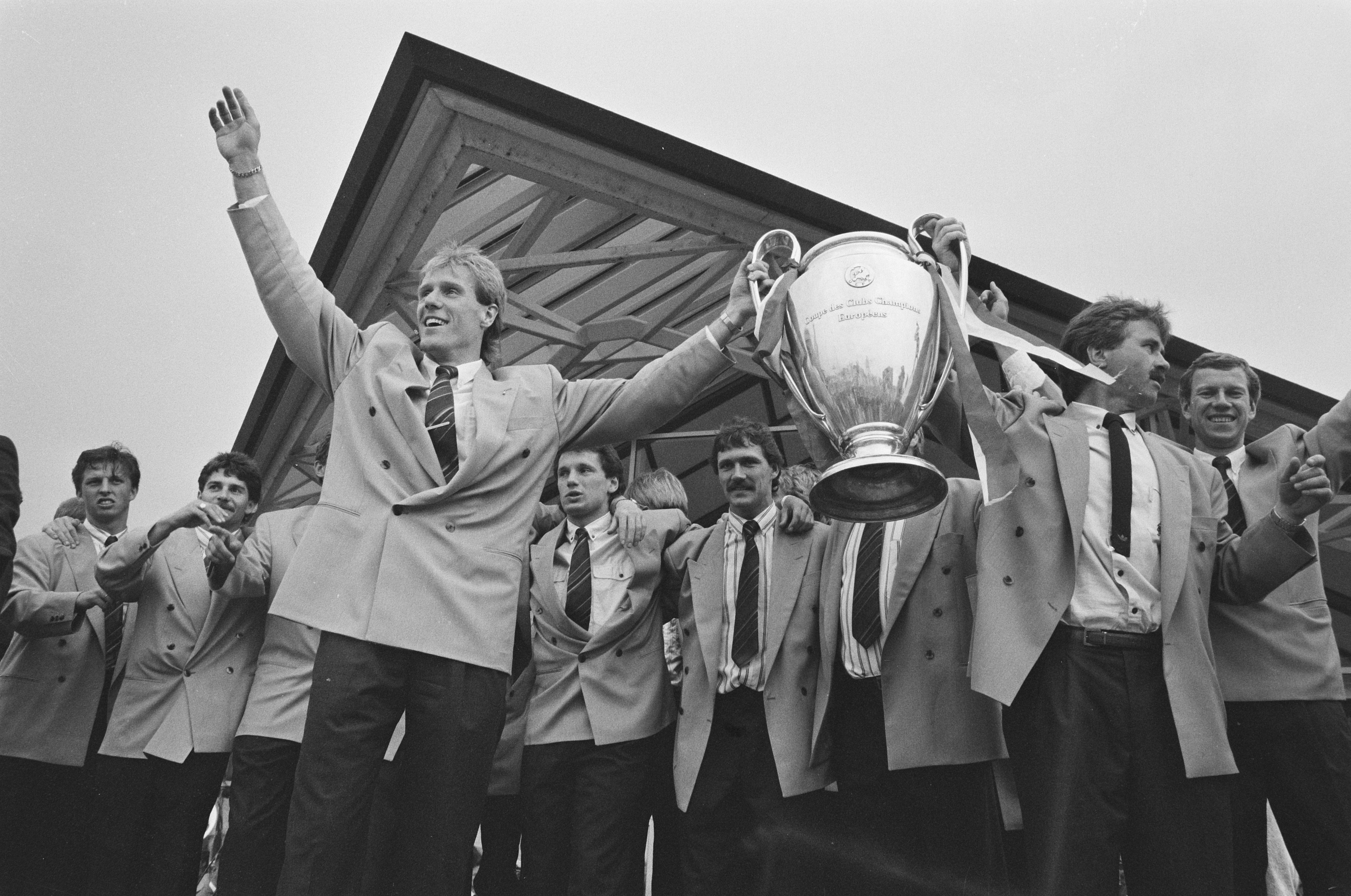
Hans van Breukelen and Guus Hiddink holding the European Cup on arrival at Eindhoven Airport

PSV completed the European Treble by winning the Eredivisie, the KNVB Cup and the European Cup.

== Squad ==
Squad at end of season

Note: Flags indicate national team as defined under FIFA eligibility rules; some limited exceptions apply. Players may hold more than one non-FIFA nationality.

No.	Pos.	Nation	Player
—	GK	NED	Patrick Lodewijks
—	GK	NED	Hans van Breukelen
—	DF	NED	Ronald Koeman
—	DF	NED	Adick Koot
—	DF	NED	Berry van Aerle
—	DF	BEL	Eric Gerets (captain)
—	DF	DEN	Jan Heintze
—	DF	DEN	Ivan Nielsen
—	DF	NED	John Veldman
—	MF	NED	Edward Linskens

No.	Pos.	Nation	Player
—	MF	NED	Willy van de Kerkhof
—	MF	NED	Gerald Vanenburg
—	MF	DEN	Frank Arnesen
—	MF	DEN	Søren Lerby
—	MF	NOR	Hallvar Thoresen
—	FW	NED	Anton Janssen
—	FW	NED	Hans Gillhaus
—	FW	NED	Wim Kieft
—	FW	NED	Eric Viscaal

== Transfers ==
=== In ===
- Søren Lerby – AS Monaco
- Anton Janssen – Fortuna Sittard

=== Out ===
- Ruud Gullit – A.C. Milan, ƒ18 million (£6 million)
- René van der Gijp – Neuchâtel Xamax
- Jurrie Koolhof – FC Groningen
- Michel Valke – Lyon

== Competitions ==
=== Eredivisie ===
==== League table ====
Pos	Team	Pld	W	D	L	GF	GA	GD	Pts	Qualification or relegation
1	PSV Eindhoven	34	27	5	2	117	28	+89	59	Entered 1988–89 European Cup
2	Ajax	34	23	4	7	78	40	+38	50	Qualified for 1988–89 UEFA Cup
3	Twente	34	16	9	9	63	40	+23	41	Qualified for Play-offs for 1988–89 UEFA Cup
4	Willem II	34	14	10	10	60	46	+14	38	Qualified for Play-offs for 1988–89 UEFA Cup
5	VVV	34	13	12	9	43	35	+8	38	Qualified for Play-offs for 1988–89 UEFA Cup

==== Results by round ====
Round	1	2	3	4	5	6	7	8	9	10	11	12	13	14	15	16	17	18	19	20	21	22	23	24	25	26	27	28	29	30	31	32	33	34
Ground	H	A	H	H	A	H	A	H	A	H	H	A	H	A	H	A	A	H	H	A	A	H	A	H	A	A	H	A	H	H	A	A	H	A
Result	W	W	W	W	W	W	W	W	W	W	W	W	W	W	W	W	W	D	W	W	D	D	W	W	D	L	W	W	W	W	D	L	W	W
Position	2	1	1	1	1	1	1	1	1	1	1	1	1	1	1	1	1	1	1	1	1	1	1	1	1	1	1	1	1	1	1	1	1	1

Updated to match(es) played on 31 May 1988. Source:
A = Away; H = Home; W = Win; D = Draw; L = Loss

=== KNVB Cup ===
==== Final ====
12 May 1988	PSV	3–2 (a.e.t.)	Roda JC	Gemeentelijk Sportpark Tilburg, Tilburg
	Gerets 52', 85'; Lerby 92'		H. Smeets 22'; R. Smeets 64'	Attendance: 8,500; Referee: Cor Verhoef

=== European Cup ===
==== First round ====
16 September 1987 First leg	PSV (Netherlands)	3–0	(Turkey) Galatasaray	Eindhoven, Netherlands
19:30 CET	Gillhaus 52'; Koeman 76'; Koot 88'	Report		Stadium: Philips Stadion

30 September 1987 Second leg	Galatasaray (Turkey)	2–0 (2–3 agg.)	(Netherlands) PSV	Istanbul, Turkey
14:00 CET	Çolak 6'; Nielsen 42' (o.g.)	Report		Stadium: Ali Sami Yen Stadium; Referee: Lajos Nemeth (Hungary)

==== Second round ====
21 October 1987 First leg	Rapid Vienna (Austria)	1–2	(Netherlands) PSV	Vienna, Austria
19:30 CET	Kranjčar 47' (pen.)	Report	Van Aerle 71'; Gillhaus 77'	Stadium: Gerhard Hanappi Stadium

4 November 1987 Second leg	PSV (Netherlands)	2–0 (1–4 agg.)	(Austria) Rapid Vienna	Eindhoven, Netherlands
19:30 CET	Lerby 15'; Gillhaus 84'	Report		Stadium: Philips Stadion; Referee: Siegfried Kirschen (West Germany)

==== Quarter-final ====
2 March 1988 First leg	Bordeaux (France)	1–1	(Netherlands) PSV	Bordeaux, France
20:30 CET	Touré 21'	Report	Kieft 40'	Stadium: Stade Chaban-Delmas

16 March 1988 Second leg	PSV (Netherlands)	0–0 (1–1a agg.)	(France) Bordeaux	Eindhoven, Netherlands
19:30 CET		Report		Stadium: Philips Stadion

==== Semi-final ====
6 April 1988 First leg	Real Madrid (Spain)	1–1	(Netherlands) PSV	Madrid, Spain
21:00 CET	Sánchez 6'	Report	Linskens 19'	Stadium: Santiago Bernabéu Stadium

20 April 1988 Second leg	PSV (Netherlands)	0–0 (1–1a agg.)	(Spain) Real Madrid	Eindhoven, Netherlands
19:30 CET		Report		Stadium: Philips Stadion

==== Final ====
25 May 1988 Final	PSV Eindhoven (Netherlands)	0–0 (a.e.t.) (6–5 p)	(Portugal) Benfica	Stuttgart, Germany
20:15 CET		Report		Stadium: Neckarstadion; Attendance: 70,000; Referee: Luigi Agnolin (Italy)
	Penalties
	Koeman (penalty scored); Kieft (penalty scored); Nielsen (penalty scored); Vanenburg (penalty scored); Lerby (penalty scored); Janssen (penalty scored)		(penalty scored) Elzo; (penalty scored) Dito; (penalty scored) Hajry; (penalty scored) Pacheco; (penalty scored) Mozer; (penalty missed) Veloso

== Statistics ==
=== Top scorers ===
==== European Cup ====
- Hans Gillhaus 3
