= Ronald Koeman =

Dutch football manager (born 1963)

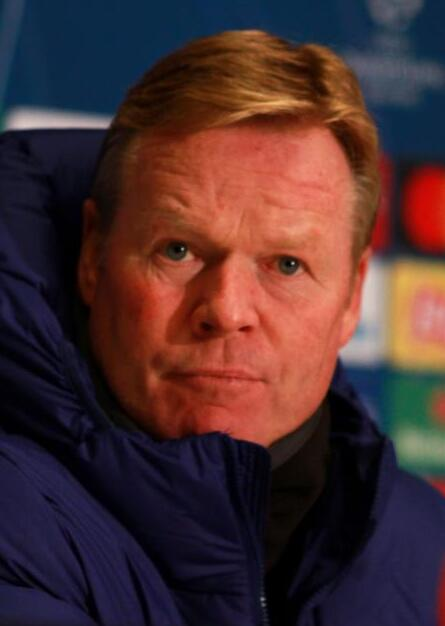
- Koeman in 2020

Personal information
- Full name: Ronald Koeman
- Date of birth: 21 March 1963 (age 63)
- Place of birth: Zaandam, Netherlands
- Height: 1.81 m (5 ft 11 in)
- Positions: Defender; midfielder

Youth career
- VV Helpman
- GRC Groningen

Senior career*
Years	Team	Apps	(Gls)
1980–1983	Groningen	90	(32)
1983–1986	Ajax	94	(23)
1986–1989	PSV	98	(51)
1989–1995	Barcelona	192	(67)
1995–1997	Feyenoord	61	(19)
Total		535	(192)

International career
1983–1994	Netherlands	78	(14)

Managerial career
- 2000–2001: Vitesse
- 2001–2005: Ajax
- 2005–2006: Benfica
- 2006–2007: PSV
- 2007–2008: Valencia
- 2009: AZ
- 2011–2014: Feyenoord
- 2014–2016: Southampton
- 2016–2017: Everton
- 2018–2020: Netherlands
- 2020–2021: Barcelona
- 2023–2026: Netherlands
Medal record
Representing Netherlands (as player)
UEFA European Championship
Winner	1988	Team
Bronze medal – third place	1992	Team
Representing Netherlands (as manager)
UEFA European Championship
Bronze medal – third place	2024	Team
UEFA Nations League
Runner-up	2019	Team
- * Club domestic league appearances and goals

Ronald Koeman (Dutch pronunciation: [ˈroːnɑlt ˈkumɑn]; born 21 March 1963) is a Dutch professional football manager and former player who was most recently manager of the Netherlands national team. Koeman scored over 250 goals whilst playing in defence for the majority of his career. Koeman was capable of playing both as a defender and as a midfielder; he frequently played as a sweeper, although he was equally known for his goalscoring, long-range shooting, and accuracy from free kicks and penalties. Because of his goalscoring, he is considered one of the best attacking center backs of all time.

Born in Zaandam, Koeman began his career at Groningen before transferring to the Netherlands' most successful club Ajax in 1983, where they won the national Eredivisie title in 1984–85. He then joined Ajax's rivals PSV in 1986, winning three consecutive Eredivisie titles (1986–87, 1987–88 and 1988–89) and the European Cup in 1988. Ronald Koeman is one of five European players to ever win a treble with their club and a cup with their national team in the same year. In 1989, Koeman moved to Barcelona and became part of Johan Cruyff's "Dream Team", helping the club win La Liga four consecutive seasons (1991 to 1994), and the 1991–92 European Cup, where he scored the winning goal of the final against Sampdoria. He moved to Feyenoord in 1995 and retired as a professional player in 1997.

At international level, Koeman was one of the stars of the Netherlands national team, alongside Marco van Basten, Ruud Gullit, Frank Rijkaard and Dennis Bergkamp. During his career with the Netherlands, Koeman won UEFA Euro 1988 and played at UEFA Euro 1992, as well as the 1990 and 1994 FIFA World Cups, captaining the team at the latter.

In his managerial career, Koeman has won three Eredivisie titles: twice with Ajax (2001–02 and 2003–04) and once with PSV (2006–07). He is the only individual to have both played for and managed the "Big Three" of Dutch football: Ajax, PSV and Feyenoord. Abroad, he had spells in Portugal with Benfica and Spain with Valencia, coaching Los Ché to victory in the 2007–08 Copa del Rey, and managed Premier League clubs Southampton and Everton in the 2010s. He was the manager of the Netherlands national team between 2018 and 2020, finishing runners-up in the 2019 UEFA Nations League. In August 2020, he was appointed manager of Barcelona, with whom he won the 2020–21 Copa del Rey, but was sacked in October 2021, following a poor start to the new season. In 2023, he was reappointed as the manager of the Netherlands national team. He decided to step down as manager of the national team shortly after the unsuccessful 2026 FIFA World Cup.

== Club career ==
=== Netherlands ===
Koeman started his professional career at Groningen, making his debut at the age of 17 years and 183 days in a 2–0 win over NEC in the Eredivisie. This made him the third-youngest player in the club's history, after Piet Wildschut and Bert de Voogt. Thirty-three goals from ninety appearances in his three seasons at the club saw the young defender called up by the Netherlands national team and earn a transfer to Eredivisie champions Ajax. After failing to defend their title in Koeman's first season at the club, the Amsterdam team regained the championship in 1984–85. The following season saw Johan Cruyff take over as Ajax head coach and, despite scoring 120 goals in 34 Eredivisie matches and winning the KNVB Cup, de Godenzonen could only finish second in the league behind rivals PSV.

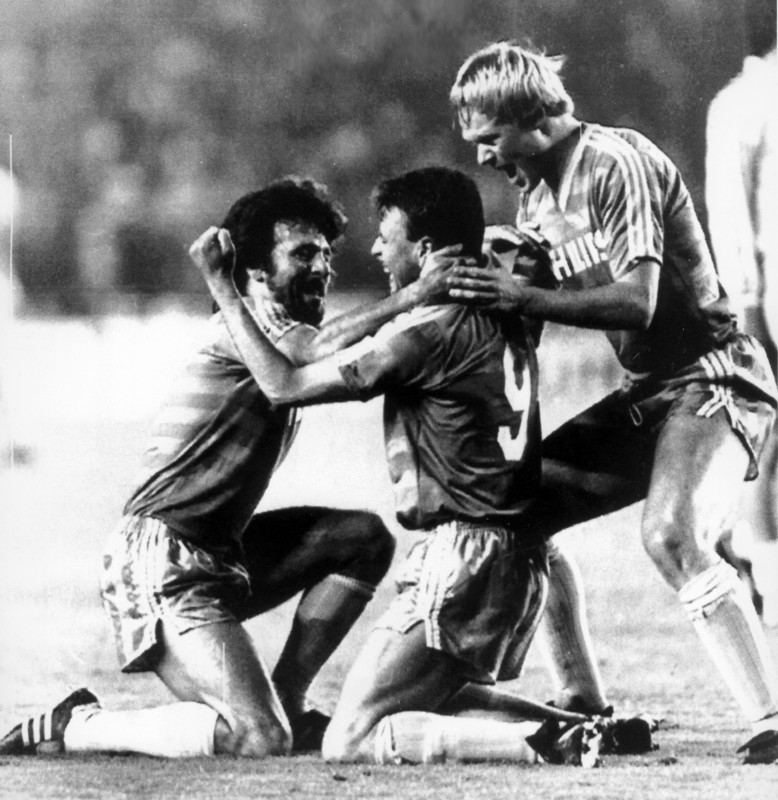
Koeman (right) celebrating the equalizer with Eric Gerets and Edward Linskens in the 1987–88 European Cup semi-final at the Santiago Bernabéu in Madrid

In the summer of 1986, Koeman controversially transferred to PSV to play for Hans Kraay's champions. Towards the end of the 1986–87 season, Kraay resigned and was replaced by Guus Hiddink, under the management of whom PSV overtook league leaders Ajax in the final weeks of the season to defend their league title. Koeman enjoyed further success with Hiddink and PSV in the following seasons, as the team also won the 1987–88 and 1988–89 Eredivisie titles and the club's first, and to date only, European Cup against Benfica in Stuttgart on 25 May 1988. PSV had also won the KNVB Cup in both 1988 and 1989, making their successes in the two years trebles and doubles respectively. In his three seasons at PSV, Koeman scored 51 goals in 98 league appearances, averaging more than one goal every two matches. During 1987–88 season, he recorded the highest scoring season of his club career, with 21 goals scored in the league.

=== Barcelona ===
In 1989, Koeman re-joined his former Ajax coach Johan Cruyff at Barcelona, where he became a member of the famous "Dream Team". During his first season at the club, Barcelona won the Copa del Rey, beating Real Madrid 2–0 in the final. Along with players such as Hristo Stoichkov, Romário, Pep Guardiola and Michael Laudrup, Koeman helped the club win La Liga four consecutive seasons years (1991 to 1994). He scored the only goal of the 1992 European Cup Final with a free-kick from the edge of the 18-yard box against Sampdoria at Wembley to make Barça European champions for the first time in their history. With this, he became the first player to score in two consecutive finals of different European competitions, having scored Barcelona's consolation goal in a 1–2 defeat against Manchester United in the 1991 European Cup Winners' Cup Final.

Koeman was known for his powerful right-footed free kicks and deadball ability where he scored many vital goals for the team. One of his best strikes in La Liga came in the memorable 5–0 win over Real Madrid in 1994, with his bending free kick making the scoreline 2–0. Koeman was joint-top scorer with eight goals in the 1993–94 UEFA Champions League, in which Barcelona were beaten 0–4 in the final by AC Milan at the Olympic Stadium in Athens.

His nicknames while playing for Barcelona were "Tintin", due to his physical similarity with Hergé's fictional character, and "Floquet de Neu", after the famous albino gorilla in the Barcelona Zoo.

=== Return to the Netherlands and retirement ===
After six years and over 200 appearances at Barcelona, Koeman left Spain to return to the Netherlands in 1995. In joining Feyenoord, he became only the second player to represent all of Dutch football's "Big Three", after Ruud Geels. Koeman spent two seasons in Rotterdam, captaining Feyenoord to third- and second-place finishes in the Eredivisie respectively.

Koeman ended his career with 192 league goals from 533 matches (ahead of Daniel Passarella, who netted 182 goals in 556 matches) during his career, more than any other defender in the history of football.

== International career ==
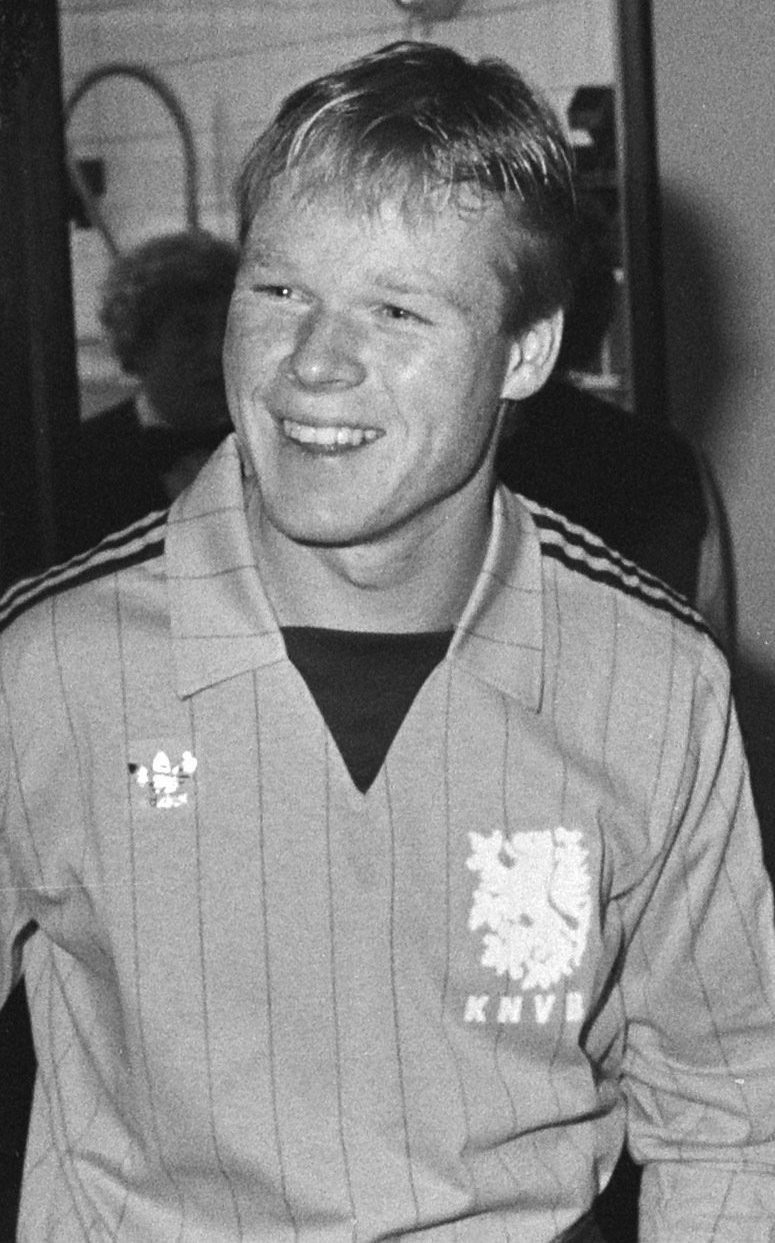
Koeman with the Dutch national team in 1983

In April 1983, both Koeman and his brother Erwin debuted for the Netherlands national team in a 3–0 friendly loss to Sweden in Utrecht. Ronald's first international goal came in September of the same year, in a 3–0 victory of Iceland at Groningen's Oosterpark Stadion.

With the Netherlands unable to qualify for UEFA Euro 1984 and the 1986 FIFA World Cup, Koeman's tournament debut came at UEFA Euro 1988 in West Germany, where Rinus Michels' team defeated the hosts at the semi-final stage, with Koeman scoring a crucial penalty to equalize and make it 1–1. After this match, Koeman provocatively pretended to wipe his backside with the shirt of Olaf Thon in front of the home supporters.

In the final, the Netherlands defeated the Soviet Union 2–0 at Munich's Olympiastadion to win the nation's only major international trophy. This completed Koeman's extraordinary 1988 after winning the treble with PSV. (Note: 1987–88 PSV Eindhoven season: European Treble; Eredivisie champions; KNVB Cup winners; European Cup winners) Both Koeman and his central defensive partner Frank Rijkaard were named in UEFA's Team of the Tournament.

Koeman went on to represent his nation at the 1990 and 1994 World Cups, as well as UEFA Euro 1992, and picked up a total of 78 caps for the Netherlands, scoring 14 goals.

== Managerial career ==
=== Early years ===
Having retired as a player after his stint with Feyenoord, Koeman became a member of the Netherlands international coaching staff of Guus Hiddink during the 1998 World Cup along with Johan Neeskens and Frank Rijkaard. After the tournament, he was appointed the assistant coach of Barcelona, and in 2000, he was handed his first managerial job as the head coach of Vitesse, where he led the team to a UEFA Cup spot in his only season.

=== Ajax ===
Koeman was appointed the manager of Ajax in 2001. He won a domestic double in 2001–02. Despite regaining the title in 2003–04, Ajax had fallen eight points behind rivals PSV in the Eredivisie. This situation, coupled with Ajax being knocked out of the UEFA Cup by Auxerre, 3–2 on aggregate, led Koeman to resign the following day on 25 February 2005. During Koeman's spell at Ajax, a young Zlatan Ibrahimovic started his rise to international fame, and Wesley Sneijder and Rafael van der Vaart made their debut.

=== Benfica ===
In June 2005, Koeman took up the vacant position at Portuguese champions Benfica, following the departure of Giovanni Trapattoni. On 13 August, he won the 2005 Supertaça Cândido de Oliveira against Vitória de Setúbal with a single goal by Nuno Gomes. The team finished the Primeira Liga in third place (behind rivals Porto and Sporting CP) and was knocked out of the Taça de Portugal in the quarter-finals by Vitória de Guimarães. This, along with an offer from PSV, sufficed for the manager to leave one year before the end of his contract. Under Koeman, Benfica did reach the quarter-finals of the 2005–06 UEFA Champions League; eliminating Manchester United in the final game of the group stage and Liverpool in the first knockout stage, before losing to Barcelona on an aggregate score of 0–2, who ended up winning the trophy.

=== PSV ===
In the 2006–07 season, Koeman served as head coach of PSV, as successor to Guus Hiddink. PSV dominated the first season half, keeping competitors AZ and Ajax at a reasonable distance, and PSV seemed almost destined to become champions again. PSV, however, suffered in the second half of the season, also because of injuries of players Jefferson Farfán, Alex and Ibrahim Afellay, obtaining only 19 out 39 possible points. Alkmaar and Ajax regained their momentum, making for a close finish, with all three teams tied at 72 points before the last competition day. Alkmaar played struggling Excelsior in their final match, but did not manage to win. Ajax played at Willem II, but did not score enough goals; it was PSV eventually who triumphed, winning at home 5–1 against Vitesse, and thereby becoming Eredivisie champions, one goal ahead of Ajax.

For the second consecutive season, he guided a team to the quarter-finals of the Champions League, this time defeating another English club in the shape of Arsenal in the first knockout stage by an aggregate score of 2–1, before losing 4–0 on aggregate to eventual runners-up Liverpool in the quarter-finals.

=== Valencia ===
On 31 October 2007, Koeman agreed to be the new coach of Valencia after the sacking of Quique Sánchez Flores, starting on 5 November 2007. With Valencia, he won the 2007–08 Copa del Rey, a tournament he previously won as a player with Barcelona. This was Valencia's first Copa del Rey since 1999. The remainder of his tenure at Valencia would prove disappointing: the team would slump to 15th in the league, only two points above the relegation zone, as well as finishing bottom of their Champions League group. A 1–5 defeat by Athletic Bilbao would prove the final straw for Koeman's time with Valencia. He was sacked the following day, on 21 April 2008.

=== AZ Alkmaar ===
Koeman was appointed manager of AZ on 18 May 2009, after Louis van Gaal, who won the 2008–09 Eredivisie with Alkmaar, joined Bayern Munich. On 5 December 2009, Alkmaar announced that Koeman no longer was in charge of the club, after losing 7 of the first 16 games in the Dutch competition.

=== Feyenoord ===
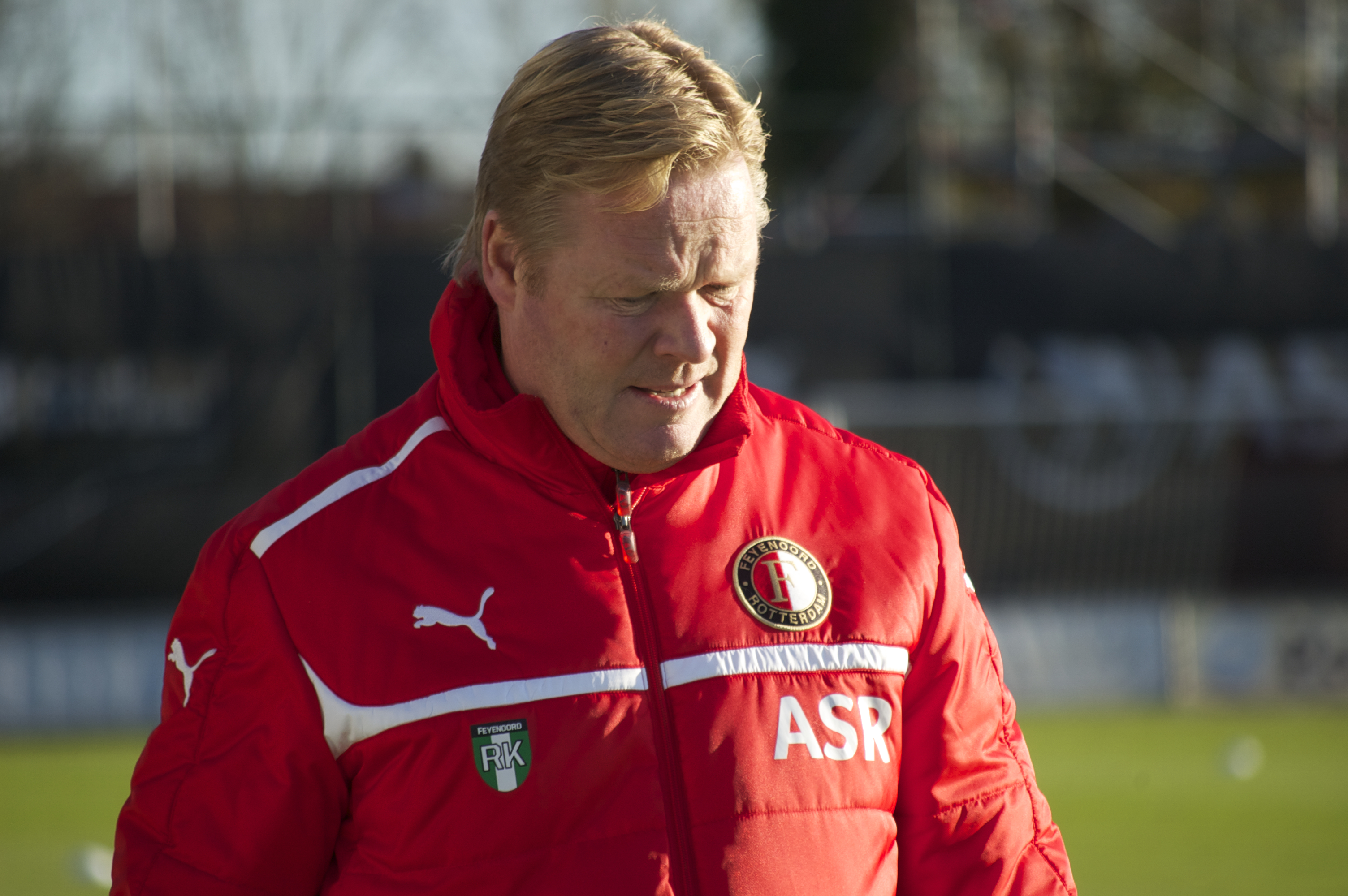
Koeman with Feyenoord in 2012

On 21 July 2011, Koeman was appointed manager of Feyenoord, signing a one-year contract with the Dutch club as replacement for outgoing trainer Mario Been. Through this appointment, Koeman became the second person to manage all teams of the so-called "traditional big three" of Dutch football (Hans Kraay Sr. being the first), but notably the first individual ever to serve the three clubs as both player and manager. Moreover, he has completed this in the same order as player and as manager. At the beginning of 2012, it was announced that his contract was extended. In February 2014, Koeman announced that he would leave his position at Feyenoord at the end of the 2013–14 season to pursue other ambitions.

=== Southampton ===
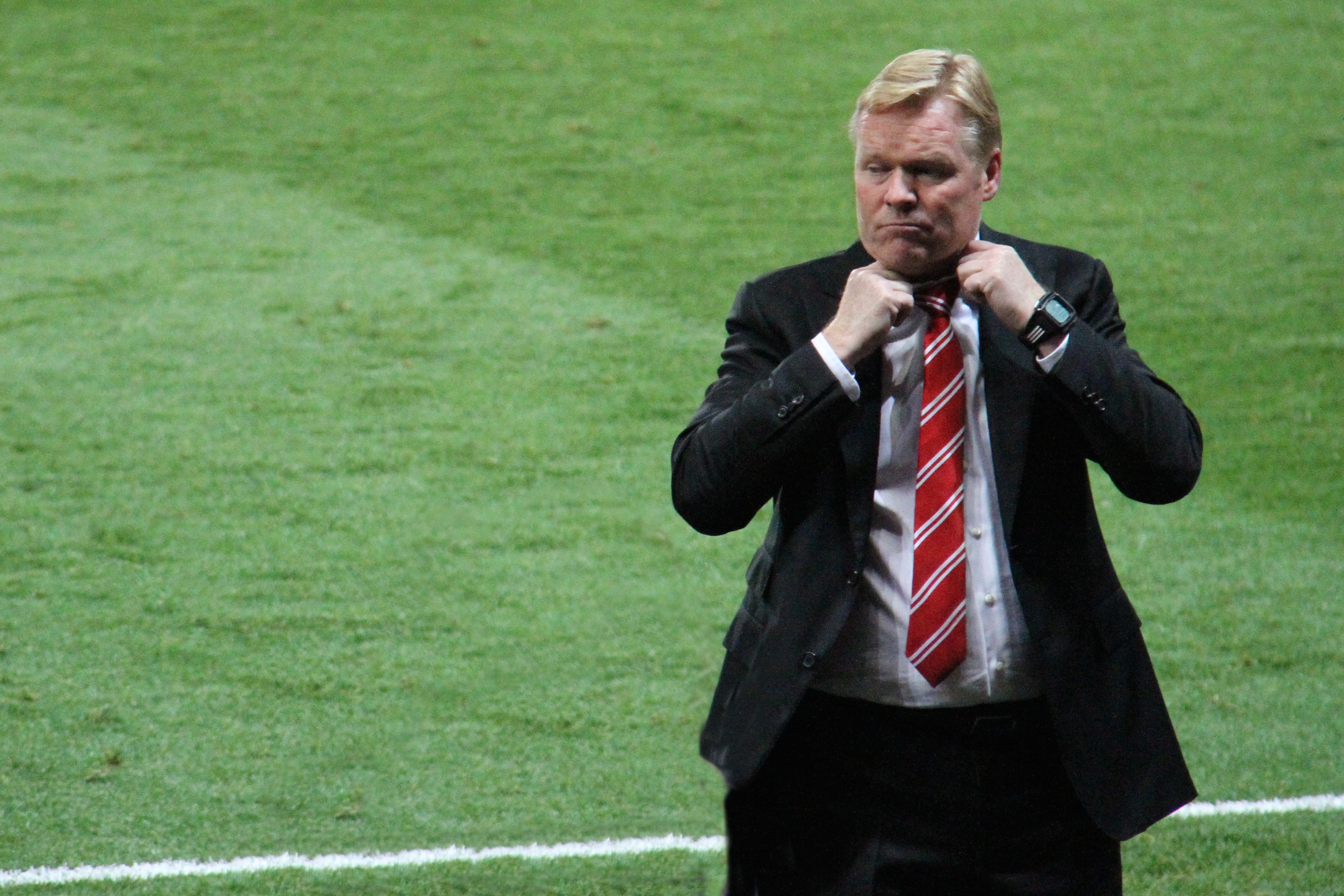
Koeman as manager of Southampton in September 2014

In June 2014, Koeman was announced as the replacement for Southampton manager Mauricio Pochettino, signing a three-year deal with the club. His brother Erwin was appointed assistant manager.

On his first interview as manager of Southampton, Koeman stressed the importance of the youth academy to the club, saying "It's a little bit like [in] Holland - they give opportunities to young players, and that's important for Southampton FC".

In his first six Premier League games in charge of the club, Koeman managed four wins, a draw and a defeat, propelling Southampton to second place in the league standings and resulting in Koeman being named Premier League Manager of the Month for September. In January 2015, Southampton won all three of their matches, including a first win at Manchester United since 1988, and Koeman was again named Manager of the Month. He led Southampton to a seventh-place finish at the end of the season.

Koeman won his third Premier League Manager of the Month for January 2016, on the way to Southampton's highest ever Premier League finish, sixth place, highest ever Premier League points total, 63, and qualification for the group stage of the UEFA Europa League.

=== Everton ===
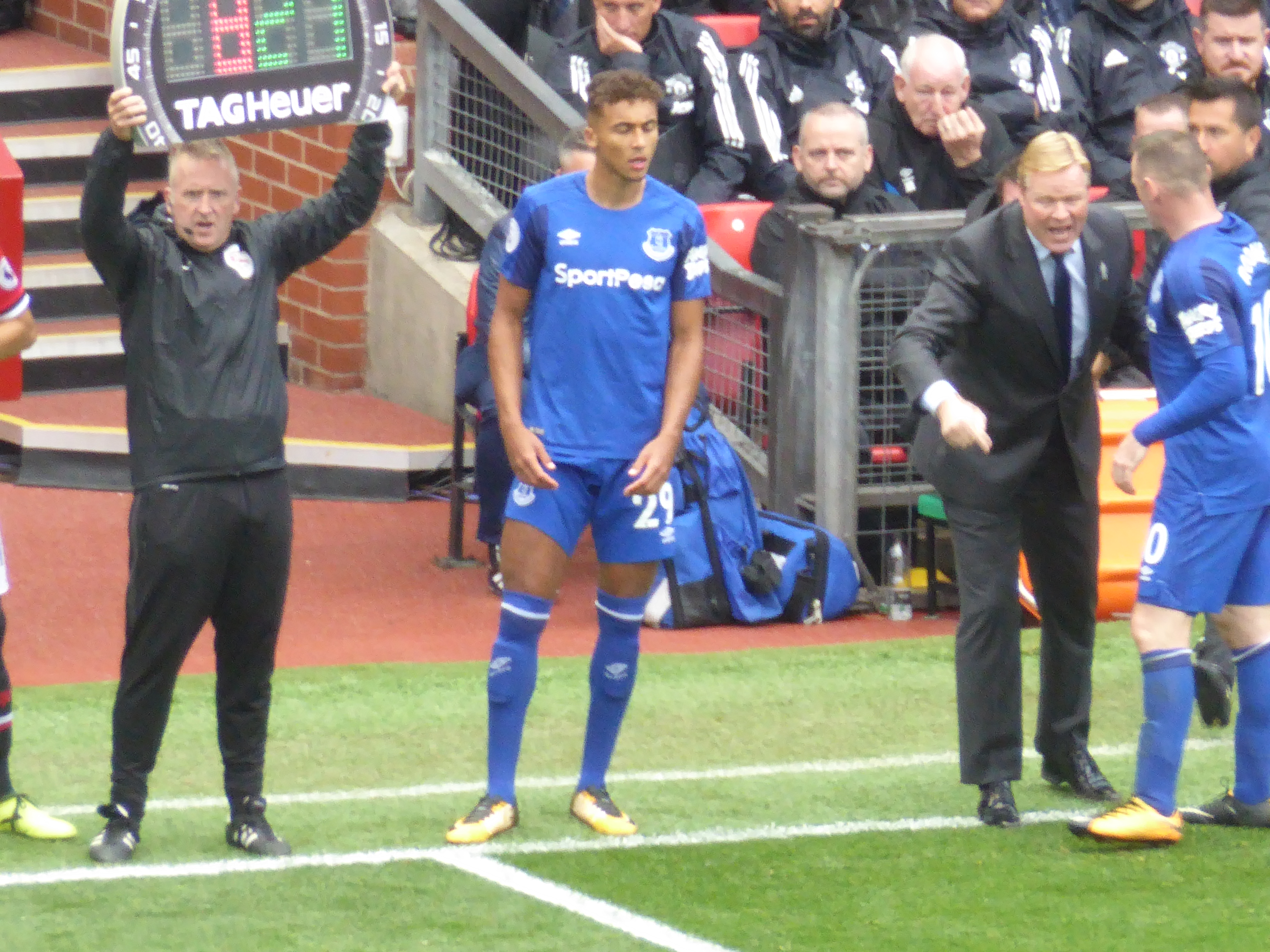
Koeman managing Everton in 2017

On 14 June 2016, Koeman was confirmed as manager of Everton, signing a three-year contract. His brother was again hired as his assistant. In his first season, Koeman led Everton to qualification for the Europa League.

Prior to the 2017–18 season, Koeman was given the largest budget in Everton's history to spend on new players. An estimated £150 million was spent on new players, but Koeman admitted that he had not bought a centre forward to replace Romelu Lukaku, the previous season's squad top scorer who had been sold to Manchester United. Koeman was sacked by the club on 23 October 2017, after his side fell into the relegation zone, following a 2–5 home defeat against Arsenal the previous day. Koeman later stated his belief that the failure to sign Olivier Giroud in the summer transfer window contributed to his sacking.

=== Netherlands ===
On 6 February 2018, Koeman was appointed manager of the Netherlands national team on a four-and-a-half-year contract up to and including the 2022 FIFA World Cup. He replaced Dick Advocaat who resigned after failing to guide the Netherlands to the 2018 FIFA World Cup.

On 9 June 2019, the Netherlands finished runners-up in the 2018–19 UEFA Nations League after a 0–1 defeat against Portugal in the final.

On 19 August 2020, Koeman left the national team to become manager of Barcelona. Under his management, Netherlands qualified for a final tournament, UEFA Euro 2020, for the first time since the 2014 FIFA World Cup after missing out on the UEFA Euro 2016 and the 2018 FIFA World Cup.

=== Barcelona ===
On 19 August 2020, Koeman was announced as the new manager of Barcelona, on a two-year contract until 30 June 2022. He took over after Quique Setién had been dismissed from the post following a disastrous 8–2 defeat to Bayern Munich in the quarter final of the 2019–20 UEFA Champions League. In his first competitive game in charge, Barcelona beat Villarreal 4–0 at the Camp Nou in La Liga. On 17 October, Koeman suffered his first loss as Barcelona manager after a 1–0 away defeat against Getafe. On 24 October, he lost the first Clásico of the season to arch rivals Real Madrid by a 3–1 scoreline. That defeat was followed by a 1–1 draw against Alavés, which resulted in Barcelona equalling their worst tally after the first six games in La Liga (eight points, as few as in the 2002–03 season). In the following weeks, several disappointing results occurred and with yet another loss against Atletico Madrid, Barcelona ended up with their worst league start since 1992, having won only 11 points in the first 8 La Liga matches.

On 17 January 2021, Koeman managed Barcelona for the first time in a cup final, with his side losing 3–2 to Athletic Bilbao after extra time in the final of the 2020–21 Supercopa de España at the Estadio de La Cartuja in Seville. On 7 February, Koeman led Barcelona to their sixth consecutive away win in La Liga after winning 3–2 against Real Betis, equalling Luis Enrique's feat achieved in the 2015–16 season. On 11 March, Barcelona were knocked out of the Champions League in the round of 16 against PSG after failing to turn around a 1–4 loss at home, losing 2–5 on aggregate. On 10 April, Barcelona's 19-game unbeaten run in La Liga came to an end after falling to Real Madrid 2–1 away from home in the second Clásico of the season. On 17 April, Koeman led Barça to a 4–0 win over Athletic Bilbao in the 2021 Copa del Rey Final, gaining revenge for the Supercopa defeat at the same venue three months earlier. On 29 April, Barcelona were presented with a golden opportunity to go top of La Liga but failed to capitalize after losing out to Granada away 2–1 despite taking the lead. Barcelona's title charge ended with a disappointment after winning only two of their last five matches and eventually finished third in the league table. Following the end of the season, club president Joan Laporta admitted that Koeman was not his first choice and was looking for a manager, however on 3 June, he confirmed that Koeman would be staying in charge for another season.

Barcelona began the 2021–22 season with a 4–2 home victory over Real Sociedad in La Liga. However, in their next ten matches, they had a disappointing run of games with 4 wins, 3 draws and 3 defeats including consecutive 3–0 losses against Bayern Munich and Benfica in the Champions League group stage and a 2–0 away defeat against title contenders Atletico Madrid in La Liga. On 24 October, following Barça's 2–1 defeat against Real Madrid at home, Koeman became the first manager since Patrick O’Connell in 1936 to lose three consecutive Clásicos. On 28 October, the club announced that Koeman had been relieved of his duties as manager following the team's 1–0 away defeat against Rayo Vallecano, with Barcelona sitting at a dissatisfying ninth place on the table. A week later, Xavi was announced as his replacement.

=== Return to the Netherlands ===
On 6 April 2022, Koeman was announced as returning to role of manager of the Netherlands national team, and would commence in the role on 1 January 2023 after the 2022 FIFA World Cup in Qatar, following the third retirement of Louis van Gaal. On 23 January 2023, he was introduced as Dutch national team coach, with an intention to go back to a 4-3-3 formation. On 24 March, he managed his first match during the UEFA Euro 2024 qualifying which ended in a 4–0 defeat against France with his team trailing by three goals after 21 minutes, an underperformance occurred more than a century after the Dutch loss to Sweden 4–1 on 24 August 1919, with three goals being scored within the first 20 minutes.

In UEFA Euro 2024, the Netherlands were drawn with France, Poland and Austria in the Group D. The Dutch defeated Poland 2–1 in the first matchday, and against France they had to settle for a 0–0 draw. In their final group match, the Netherlands lost to Austria, conceding three goals and scoring two. The Netherlands finished Group D among the four best third placed teams, thus ensuring qualification to the Round of 16, where they played against Romania and won 3–0. In the Quarter finals, the Dutch defeated Turkey 2–1, but were eliminated by England in the Semi finals, losing 2–1. This was the first time since the 2014 World Cup that the Netherlands made the semi-finals of a major international tournament.

During the 2026 FIFA World Cup, Koeman's team earned seven points in the group stage, setting up a round of 32 match against Morocco. Koeman was widely criticized by pundits and supporters for adopting a highly defensive tactical approach, deploying a five-defender system that was seen as a departure from the Netherlands' traditional attacking style. Following the Netherlands' round of 32 elimination, Koeman announced on 30 June 2026 that he would step down as Netherlands manager when his contract expired in July 2026.

== Style of play ==
A composed player on the ball, Koeman was capable of being deployed both as a defender and as a midfielder, and he frequently played as a sweeper, due to his vision and his ability on the ball. Regarded as one of the best and most prolific attacking central defenders of all time, due to his eye for goal, Koeman was renowned for his long-range passing, as well as his shooting accuracy and power from distance, especially on free kicks; he is the top scoring defender in world football, and Barcelona's top scoring defender. A versatile set piece specialist, Koeman was nicknamed the King of free kicks, and was capable of striking the ball with power from long range free kicks, or curling shots on goal from close range; he was also an accurate penalty kick taker. Regarding his unique run-up and approach to taking free kicks and penalties, Rob Smyth of The Guardian commented in 2009: "We tend to associate Koeman with that particular type of free-kick, where he would lace the ball in a manner that was paradoxically sledgehammer rather than silk, yet if anything he was more adept at the seductive, shorter-range curler. As with his penalties, when he would charge towards the ball like a man with murder in mind only to tap it gently into the net, part of the skill was in the deception. With Koeman, there was more than one way to skin a defensive wall; as all Englishmen know well, he could flippin' flip one as well."

== Style of management ==
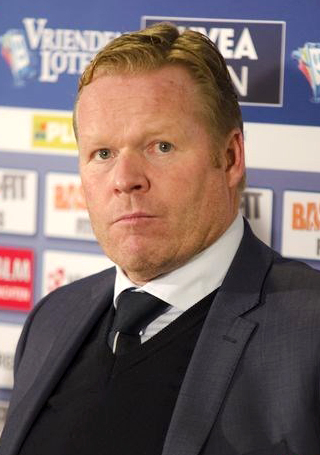
Koeman in 2014

Koeman most commonly organises his teams to have a defensive approach led by their method of attack, whether that be a 4–3–3, a 4–2–3–1 or an alternative, and to defend with minimal space between the lines. Describing his coaching style when appointed as manager of Barcelona, he said: "I’m a coach who likes his teams to be disciplined and well-organised team. I like to dominate games. The Dutch like attacking football. I like to be direct and have good communication with my players. We hold short meetings but that make the message clear."

== Records ==
Koeman is the top scoring defender in world football, scoring 90 goals in all competitions for Barcelona. An accurate free kick and penalty kick taker, Koeman was nicknamed the King of free kicks throughout his playing career, and is Barcelona's second-highest goalscorer from free kicks, after previous club captain Lionel Messi, with 26 goals from set pieces in all competitions; he is also Barcelona's second-highest scorer from penalties in La Liga, behind Messi once again, with 46 goals from spot kicks, and the highest scoring defender in La Liga from penalties. With 67 goals, he is the second most prolific defender in La Liga history, behind Sergio Ramos. He currently holds the record for 25 consecutive successful penalty conversions in La Liga.

== Personal life ==
Ronald is the son of former Dutch international Martin Koeman and the younger brother of his former international teammate Erwin Koeman. He was married to Bartina Koeman, until her death in September 2026 from breast cancer, at the age of 65. Their son, Ronald Koeman Jr., is a professional goalkeeper for Telstar in the Eredivisie.

When Erwin was appointed as the head coach of Oman in 2019, they became the first set of brothers to take charge of two different national teams at the same time.

Koeman is an ambassador for the anti-smoking campaign Kick it with Help. He said that the cancer diagnoses of his wife and his friend Johan Cruyff motivated him to join the campaign.

During the transfer as a manager to Barcelona in 2020, Koeman was filmed for a 3-part docuseries entitled, Força Koeman. The series can be seen on Dutch streaming service "Videoland" from 17 February 2021.

Koeman stated that he has been visiting the Portuguese region of Algarve since 1988 after the victory of PSV in the 1988 European Cup Final against Portuguese football club Benfica. He bought a plot of land with 1,000 m^{2} (11,000 ft^{2}) there in 2004 and built a 2,000,000 euro house for himself in Vale do Lobo between 2005 and 2006.

== Career statistics ==
=== Club ===
Appearances and goals by club, season and competition
Club	Season	League			National cup (Note: Includes KNVB Cup, Copa del Rey)		Continental		Other		Total	
Club	Season	Division	Apps	Goals	Apps	Goals	Apps	Goals	Apps	Goals	Apps	Goals
Groningen	1980–81	Eredivisie	24	4	3	2	—		—		27	6
Groningen	1981–82	Eredivisie	33	14	1	0	—		—		34	14
Groningen	1982–83	Eredivisie	33	14	4	0	—		—		37	14
Groningen	Total		90	32	8	2	—		—		98	34
Ajax	1983–84	Eredivisie	32	7	4	2	2 (Note: Appearances in European Cup)	0	—		38	9
Ajax	1984–85	Eredivisie	30	9	2	1	4 (Note: Appearances in UEFA Cup)	3	—		36	13
Ajax	1985–86	Eredivisie	32	7	6	1	2	0	—		40	8
Ajax	Total		94	23	12	4	8	3	—		114	30
PSV	1986–87	Eredivisie	34	16	3	3	2	0	—		39	19
PSV	1987–88	Eredivisie	32	21	6	4	8	1	—		46	26
PSV	1988–89	Eredivisie	32	14	6	1	4	2	3 (Note: Two appearances in European Super Cup, one appearance and one goal in Intercontinental Cup)	1	45	18
PSV	Total		98	51	15	8	14	3	3	1	130	63
Barcelona	1989–90	La Liga	36	14	7	4	4 (Note: Appearance in European Cup Winners' Cup)	1	1 (Note: Appearance in European Super Cup)	0	48	19
Barcelona	1990–91	La Liga	21	6	4	2	7	4	0	0	32	12
Barcelona	1991–92	La Liga	35	16	2	0	11	1	1 (Note: Appearance in Supercopa de España)	0	49	17
Barcelona	1992–93	La Liga	33	11	3	0	3 (Note: Appearances in UEFA Champions League)	0	4 (Note: One appearance in Supercopa de España, two appearances in European Super Cup, one appearance in Intercontinental Cup)	0	43	11
Barcelona	1993–94	La Liga	35	11	2	0	12	8	1	0	50	19
Barcelona	1994–95	La Liga	32	9	1	0	8	1	1	0	42	10
Barcelona	Total		192	67	19	6	45	15	8	0	264	88
Feyenoord	1995–96	Eredivisie	31	10	3	1	7	3	1 (Note: Appearance in Dutch Supercup)	0	42	14
Feyenoord	1996–97	Eredivisie	30	9	2	0	5	0	—		37	9
Feyenoord	Total		61	19	5	1	12	3	1	0	79	23
Career total			535	192	59	21	79	24	12	1	685	238

=== International ===
Appearances and goals by national team and year
National team	Year	Apps	Goals
Netherlands	1983	6	1
Netherlands	1984	1	0
Netherlands	1985	1	0
Netherlands	1986	6	0
Netherlands	1987	7	2
Netherlands	1988	10	1
Netherlands	1989	8	3
Netherlands	1990	9	3
Netherlands	1991	4	0
Netherlands	1992	12	0
Netherlands	1993	5	2
Netherlands	1994	9	2
Total		78	14

Scores and results list Netherlands's goal tally first, score column indicates score after each Koeman goal.

List of international goals scored by Ronald Koeman
No.	Date	Venue	Opponent	Score	Result	Competition
1	7 September 1983	Oosterpark Stadion, Groningen, Netherlands	Iceland	1–0	3–0	UEFA Euro 1984 qualifier
2	9 December 1987	Stadion De Meer, Amsterdam, Netherlands	Cyprus	3–0	4–0	UEFA Euro 1988 qualifier
3	16 December 1987	Diagoras Stadium, Rhodes, Greece	Greece	1–0	3–0	UEFA Euro 1988 qualifier
4	21 June 1988	Volksparkstadion, Hamburg, West Germany	West Germany	1–1	2–1	UEFA Euro 1988
5	22 March 1989	Philips Stadion, Eindhoven, Netherlands	Soviet Union	2–0	2–0	Friendly
6	6 September 1989	Olympisch Stadion, Amsterdam, Netherlands	Denmark	1–0	2–2	Friendly
7	15 November 1989	De Kuip, Rotterdam, Netherlands	Finland	3–0	3–0	1990 FIFA World Cup qualifier
8	28 March 1990	Republican Stadium, Kyiv, Ukraine	Soviet Union	1–1	1–2	Friendly
9	30 May 1990	Praterstadion, Vienna, Austria	Austria	1–3	2–3	Friendly
10	24 June 1990	San Siro, Milan, Italy	West Germany	1–2	1–2	1990 FIFA World Cup
11	22 September 1993	Stadio Renato Dall'Ara, Bologna, Italy	San Marino	7–0	7–0	1994 FIFA World Cup qualifier
12	13 October 1993	De Kuip, Rotterdam, Netherlands	England	1–0	2–0	1994 FIFA World Cup qualifier
13	19 January 1994	Stade El Menzah, Tunis, Tunisia	Tunisia	2–2	2–2	Friendly
14	1 June 1994	Philips Stadion, Eindhoven, Netherlands	Hungary	3–1	7–1	Friendly

== Managerial statistics ==
As of 30 June 2026

Managerial record by team and tenure
Team	Nat.	From	To	Record								Ref.
Team	Nat.	From	To	G	W	D	L	GF	GA	GD	Win %	Ref.
Vitesse	(Netherlands)	1 January 2000	2 December 2001	79	40	23	16	132	77	+55	50.63	
Ajax	(Netherlands)	3 December 2001	25 February 2005	151	94	30	27	322	147	+175	62.25	
Benfica	(Portugal)	8 June 2005	8 May 2006	49	27	11	11	64	38	+26	55.10	
PSV	(Netherlands)	1 July 2006	31 October 2007	63	38	11	14	118	54	+64	60.32	
Valencia	(Spain)	5 November 2007	21 April 2008	34	11	9	14	38	47	−9	32.35	
AZ	(Netherlands)	18 May 2009	5 December 2009	24	11	4	9	44	30	+14	45.83	
Feyenoord	(Netherlands)	21 July 2011	31 May 2014	118	67	23	28	237	137	+100	56.78	
Southampton	(England)	16 June 2014	14 June 2016	91	44	17	30	140	93	+47	48.35	
Everton	(England)	14 June 2016	23 October 2017	58	24	14	20	85	74	+11	41.38	
Netherlands	(Netherlands)	6 February 2018	18 August 2020	20	11	5	4	43	18	+25	55.00	
Barcelona	(Spain)	19 August 2020	27 October 2021	67	39	12	16	138	75	+63	58.21	
Netherlands	(Netherlands)	1 January 2023	30 June 2026	45	25	11	9	108	48	+60	55.56	
Career Total				799	431	170	198	1,470	838	+632	53.94	

== Honours ==
=== Player ===
Ajax

- Eredivisie: 1984–85
- KNVB Cup: 1985–86

PSV

- Eredivisie: 1986–87, 1987–88, 1988–89
- KNVB Cup: 1987–88, 1988–89
- European Cup: 1987–88

Barcelona

- La Liga: 1990–91, 1991–92, 1992–93, 1993–94
- Copa del Rey: 1989–90
- Supercopa de España: 1991, 1992, 1994
- European Cup/UEFA Champions League: 1991–92; runner-up: 1993–94
- European Super Cup: 1992

Netherlands

- UEFA European Championship: 1988

Individual

- Dutch Footballer of the Year: 1987, 1988
- UEFA European Championship Team of the Tournament: 1988
- Onze Mondial: 1988, 1992, 1993, 1994
- UEFA Champions League top scorer: 1993–94
- UEFA Golden Jubilee Poll: No. 26

=== Manager ===
Ajax

- Eredivisie: 2001–02, 2003–04
- KNVB Cup: 2001–02
- Johan Cruyff Shield: 2002

Benfica

- Supertaça Cândido de Oliveira: 2005

PSV

- Eredivisie: 2006–07

Valencia

- Copa del Rey: 2007–08

AZ

- Johan Cruyff Shield: 2009

Netherlands

- UEFA Nations League runner-up: 2018–19

Barcelona

- Copa del Rey: 2020–21

Individual

- Rinus Michels Award: 2012
- Premier League Manager of the Month: September 2014, January 2015, January 2016
