= Guus Hiddink =

Dutch association football player and manager

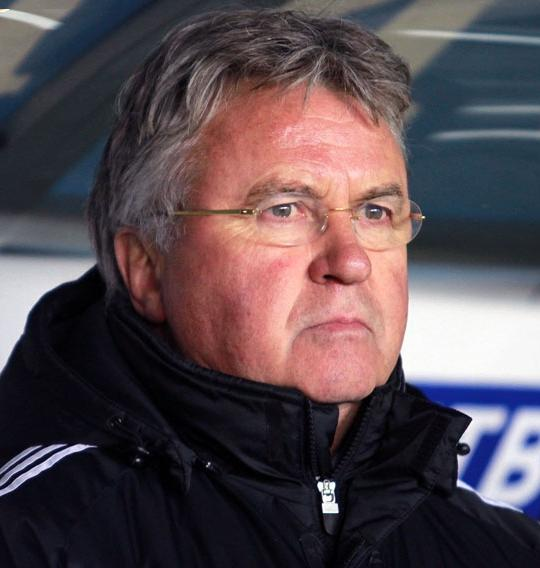
- Hiddink in 2012

Personal information
- Full name: Guus Hiddink
- Date of birth: 8 November 1946 (age 80)
- Place of birth: Varsseveld, Netherlands
- Position: Midfielder

Youth career
- SC Varsseveld

Senior career*
Years	Team	Apps	(Gls)
1967–1970	De Graafschap	106	(45)
1970–1971	PSV	30	(1)
1972–1977	De Graafschap	181	(20)
1977–1981	NEC	104	(2)
1978	→ Washington Diplomats (loan)	13	(4)
1980	→ San Jose Earthquakes (loan)	15	(0)
1981–1983	De Graafschap	43	(0)
Total		492	(72)

Managerial career
- 1987–1990: PSV
- 1990–1991: Fenerbahçe
- 1991–1993: Valencia
- 1994: Valencia
- 1995–1998: Netherlands
- 1998–1999: Real Madrid
- 2000: Real Betis
- 2001–2002: South Korea
- 2002–2006: PSV
- 2005–2006: Australia
- 2006–2010: Russia
- 2009: Chelsea (caretaker)
- 2010–2011: Turkey
- 2012–2013: Anzhi Makhachkala
- 2014–2015: Netherlands
- 2015–2016: Chelsea (caretaker)
- 2018–2019: China U23
- 2020–2021: Curaçao
Medal record
Men's football
Representing Russia (as manager)
UEFA European Championship
Bronze medal – third place	2008 Austria–Switzerland
- * Club domestic league appearances and goals

Guus Hiddink (Dutch pronunciation: [ˈɣys ˈɦɪdɪŋk]; born 8 November 1946) is a Dutch former football manager and professional player. He enjoyed a long career playing as a midfielder in his native Netherlands. After retiring as a player in 1982, Hiddink went into management, leading clubs and countries from across the globe to achieve various titles and feats. Notable achievements include a European Cup with PSV Eindhoven and an Intercontinental Cup with Real Madrid.

== Playing career ==
Hiddink was born in Varsseveld and started his career as a player in the youth side of amateur club SC Varsseveld. He turned professional after signing for Dutch club De Graafschap in 1967, playing at the Doetinchem club under manager Piet de Visser. In 1973, during Hiddink's second spell there, he and manager de Visser earned promotion to the Eredivisie, the top league in Dutch football. For some years the careers of the two men intersected: when Hiddink managed PSV Eindhoven, De Visser scouted numerous South American players for the team, such as Ronaldo, Romário, and former Chelsea defender Alex. Also, De Visser, in his role as personal advisor to Roman Abramovich, was influential in bringing Hiddink to the Russia national team and later to Chelsea as caretaker manager following the dismissal of Brazilian Luiz Felipe Scolari.

Hiddink spent most of his playing career at De Graafschap, including three years under de Visser, and remains a fan of the club. He joined PSV in 1970, but after failing to win a permanent position in the team, rejoined De Graafschap after just one year and remained there until 1977. In 1981, he rejoined De Graafschap again and retired a year later. Generally he played as a midfielder.

== Managerial career ==
=== PSV Eindhoven ===
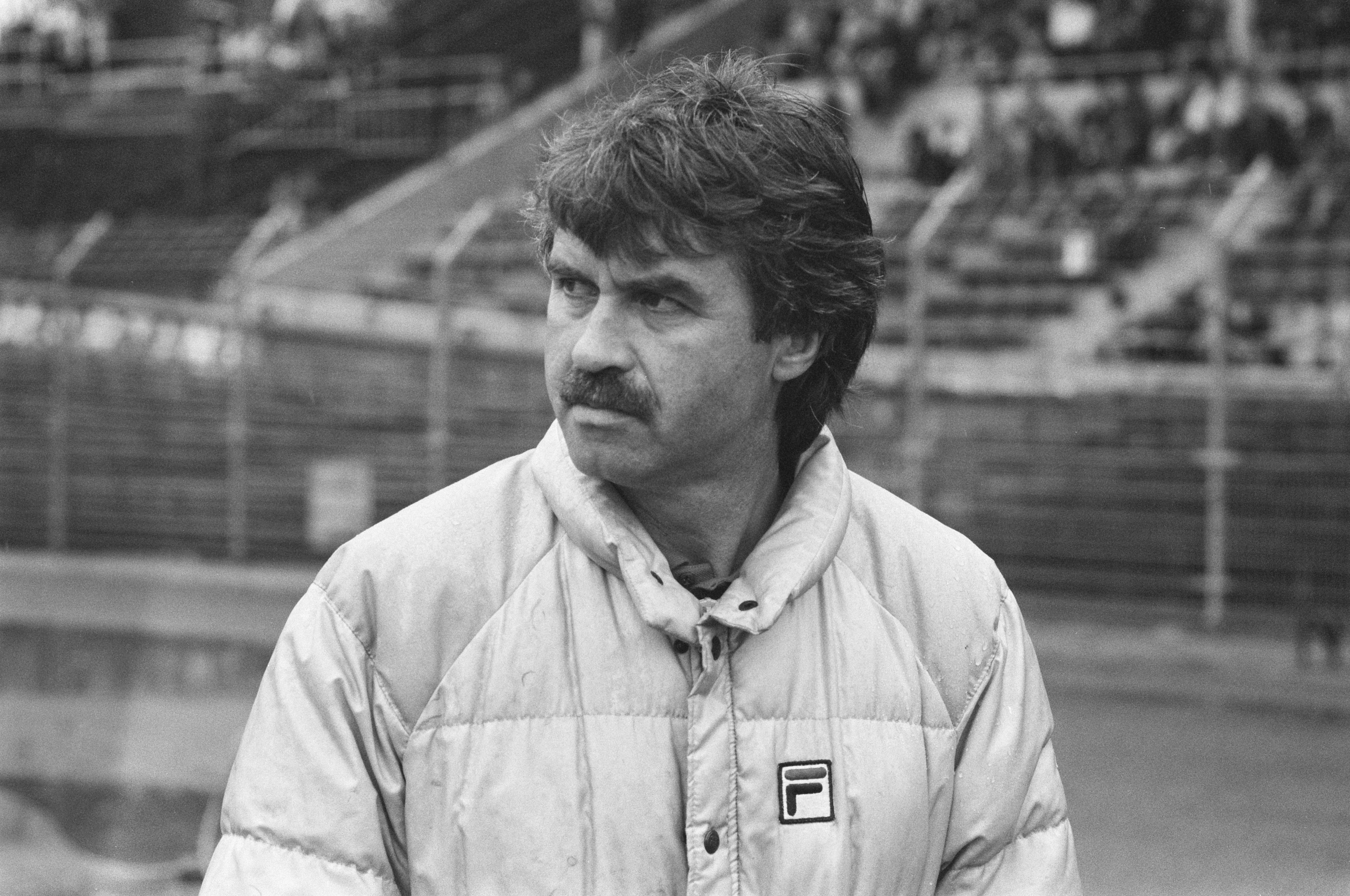
Guus Hiddink in 1988 as manager of PSV

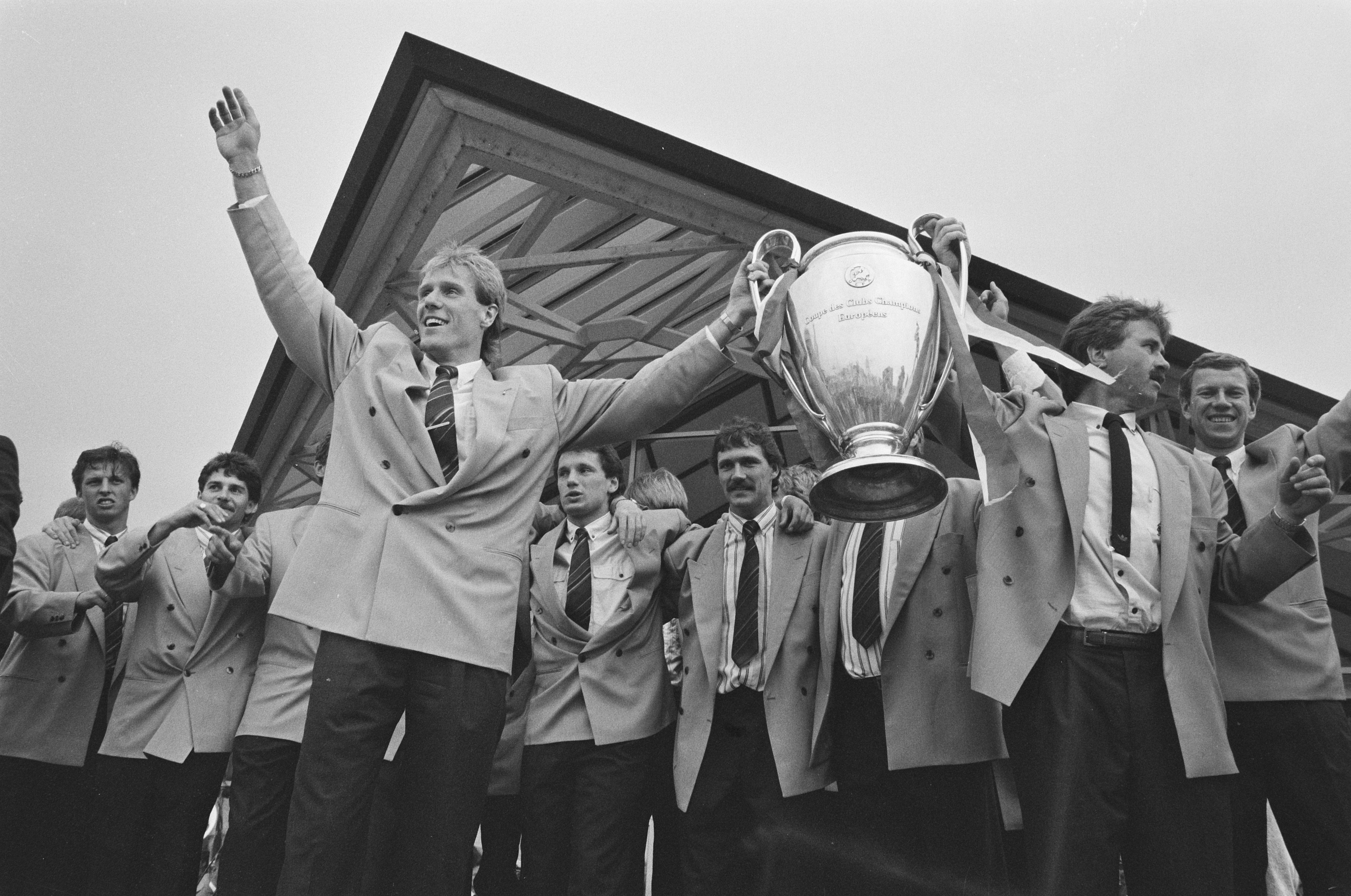
Hiddink (right) and Hans van Breukelen (left) holding the European Cup on arrival at Eindhoven Airport

Hiddink honed his coaching skills as assistant manager at PSV Eindhoven from 1983 until he was appointed manager there in March 1987. When he took command, the club was three points behind Ajax in the league, with ten matches remaining. PSV, however, managed to win the championship six points ahead of Ajax.

It was at PSV where he led the team to its first ever European Cup triumph in 1988 (and The Treble), affirming the Eindhoven club's ranking as one of the three giants of Dutch football, alongside rivals Ajax and Feyenoord. He also won three Eredivisie titles with the club between 1987 and 1990. "Hiddink will never take all the credit for himself, he will also involve his staff in it. That adds to the strong sense of unity. Hiddink has final responsibility, but always shares it with the team around him. He is a real team player", said Berry van Aerle, who was coached by Hiddink in two separate periods with PSV.

Overall, Hiddink's PSV side won three consecutive Eredivisie titles, three consecutive KNVB Cups and the European Cup in the historic Treble-winning season of 1987–88.

Hiddink also had a coaching stint at Turkish club Fenerbahçe in 1990, but was dismissed after one year, later joining Spanish giants Valencia.

=== Netherlands ===
Hiddink faced his biggest managerial challenge when he took over the reins of the Netherlands national team on 1 January 1995, where he took charge of a team of talented individuals continually racked by internal arguments and disputes. His usual 4–4–2 tactic of deploying wingers backed-up by central midfielders resulted in goals from defensive midfielders such as Philip Cocu and Edgar Davids. Hiddink took a firm approach to the team, an example of which was demonstrated at UEFA Euro 1996 when Edgar Davids was sent home after an argument with Hiddink. The team reached the quarter-finals of that tournament before losing on penalties to France.

He was able to prevent further internal conflict in the 1998 FIFA World Cup where his team played some of the more entertaining football in that tournament. The team beat Argentina in the quarter-finals 2–1, then suffered a defeat at the hands of Brazil on penalties in the semi-final—later finishing fourth. This loss signalled an end of another era for Hiddink, as he resigned as Netherlands national coach soon after, where he was then appointed manager of Spanish giants Real Madrid.

=== Real Madrid and Real Betis ===
Hiddink became manager of Spanish La Liga side Real Madrid in the summer of 1998, replacing Jupp Heynckes, but poor league form and off-pitch remarks about the board and finances of the club prompted his termination in February 1999.

Hiddink then took over the reins at Spanish club Real Betis in 2000 for the rest of the season. His time there ended badly, with him being sacked by May 2000.

In the summer of 2000, rumours were rife over his future, with Scottish club Celtic among the clubs named as a potential destination. The temptation to manage another World Cup–bound international team proved irresistible to him, however, and he agreed to coach the South Korea national team on 1 January 2001.

=== South Korea ===
Hiddink became manager of South Korea in January 2001. Success hardly came easy with a team that had appeared in five straight World Cups but had yet to win a single match. South Korea co-hosted the 2002 FIFA World Cup tournament with Japan. Both countries were expected to make the second round of the tournament and it was clearly expressed that Hiddink's team was expected to perform to that standard as well.

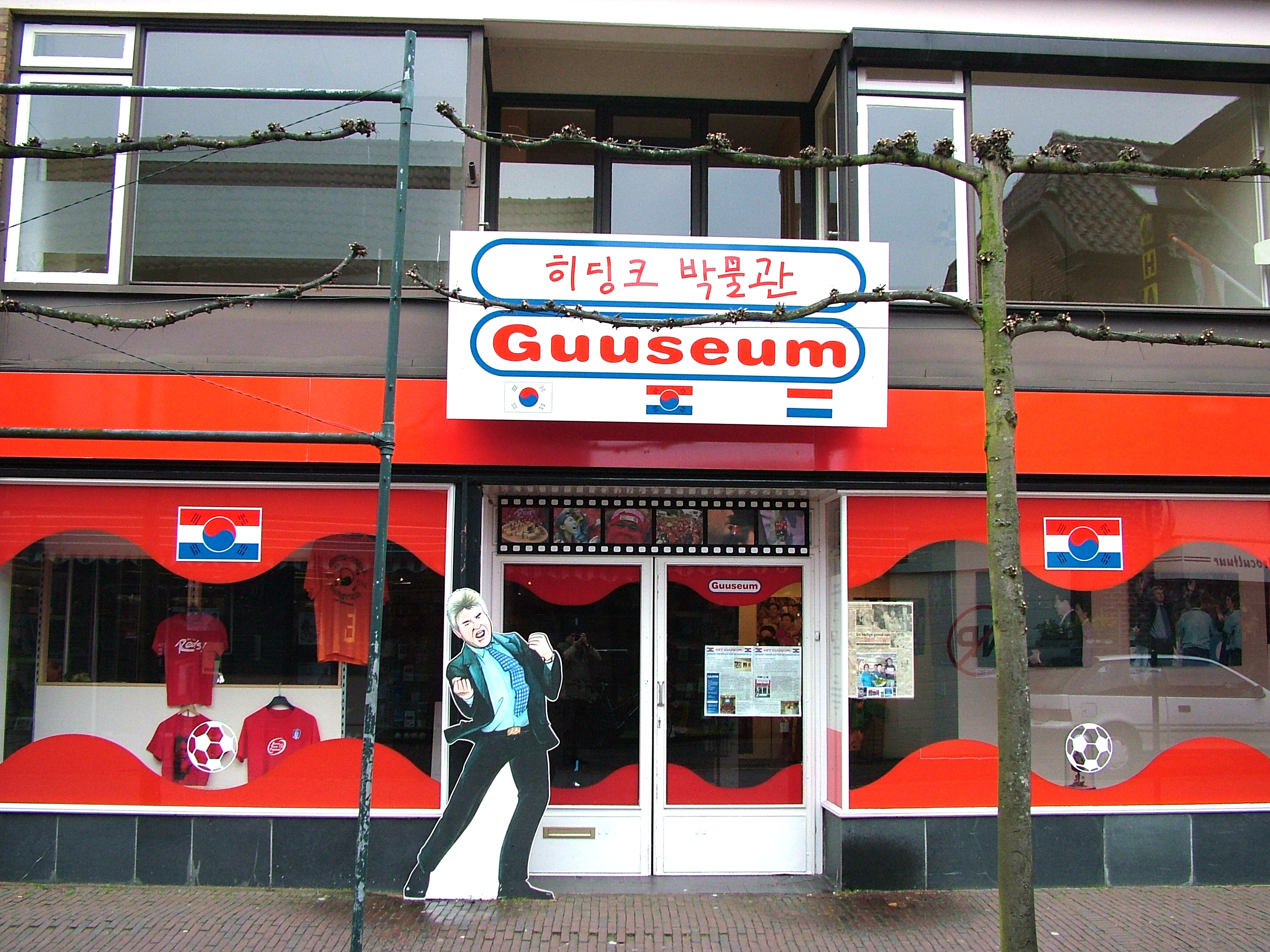
Guuseum in Varsseveld. 히딩크 박물관 in Korean

Hiddink's first year in charge was met with heavy criticism from the South Korean media, as he was often spotted together with his girlfriend when some felt he should instead have been busy working on the team. After a 2–1 loss to the United States Gold Cup team in January 2002, he was criticized again for not taking his job seriously. Nevertheless, the team he assembled was a cohesive unit. However, Hiddink began focusing on physical fitness for players during training in preparation for the World Cup later that year.

At the World Cup, Hiddink's team achieved its first victory in the tournament's history in a 2–0 group win over Poland. After a 1–1 draw with the U.S. and a 1–0 victory against heavily favoured Portugal, South Korea advanced to the second round.

Their second-round opponents were Italy, whom they upset 2–1 with a golden goal by Ahn Jung-hwan. The Korean public began to dream of a semifinal berth, something that came true after another upset, this time Spain, on penalties in the quarterfinal. This surpassed the feat of North Korea in the tournament 36 years earlier, which beat Italy to reach the quarterfinals.

South Korea's miracle run finally ended after Germany under Rudi Völler won 1-0 in the semifinals. As with the Dutch team four years earlier in France, Hiddink led his team to fourth place after a 3–2 defeat to Turkey in the consolation game.

Prior to the tournament, football pundits and fans alike never expected this level of success. Many in South Korea were overjoyed with the semi-final berth. Hiddink became the first-ever person to be given honorary South Korean citizenship. In addition, other rewards soon followed — a private villa in Jeju-do island, free flights for life with Korean Air and Asiana Airlines, and free taxi rides, amongst others. The Gwangju World Cup Stadium in Gwangju, where South Korea qualified for the semi-finals, was renamed Guus Hiddink Stadium in his honor shortly after the tournament. His hometown of Varsseveld, where a Guuseum was set up by his relatives in his honor, became a popular stop for South Koreans visiting the Netherlands.

=== Return to PSV ===
Hiddink chose to return to his native country and took over the coaching duties at PSV Eindhoven in 2002. During his second spell with PSV, Hiddink won three Dutch league titles (2002–03, 2004–05, and 2005–06), the 2005 Dutch Cup and the 2003 Dutch Super Cup. In Europe, the 2004–05 Champions League led to PSV's first ever appearance in the semi-final of the tournament since it adopted its current format in 1992–93 (PSV won the European Cup, the predecessor to the modern Champions League, in 1988, with Hiddink as coach). PSV narrowly lost the semi-final to Milan, on away goals.

In the 2005–06 Champions League season, PSV made it through the group stage, but was eliminated in the first knockout round, having lost five of its starting 11 (Park Ji-sung to Manchester United, Lee Young-pyo to Tottenham Hotspur, Mark van Bommel to Barcelona, Johann Vogel to Milan and Wilfred Bouma to Aston Villa) to transfers. This period at PSV made Hiddink the most successful Dutch coach in history, with six Dutch League titles and four Dutch Cups, surpassing the record of Rinus Michels. Hiddink left the club in June 2006.

=== Australia ===
On 22 July 2005, Hiddink became manager of the Australia national team. He announced he would manage both PSV and Australia at the same time.

In the play-offs held with Uruguay in Montevideo on 12 November and in Sydney on 16 November 2005, both home teams won 1–0. Australia went on to win 4–2 on penalties — the first time Australia had qualified for the finals in 32 years, and the first time that any team had qualified through winning a penalty shoot-out.

Hiddink was a popular figure in Australia and was referred to affectionately as "Aussie Guus". A telling example of the public affection for him was the Socceroo fans chant of "Goooooooooooos!" during moments of play. Slogans for the Socceroos' 2006 World Cup campaign were "No Guus, No Glory", "Guus for P.M." and "In Guus We Trust", as well as the play on words of the famous taunt "Guus your Daddy?". During the World Cup, a Sydney newspaper started a humorous campaign to lure him away from Russia by proposing a national "Guus tax" to pay his wages. More seriously, his reputation was enhanced by his transformation of the national side, with pundits focusing on the improvement to Australia's defence. He is credited with turning a team which conceded many goals under Frank Farina into a solid defensive unit which only conceded one goal away from home to both Uruguay and the Netherlands. Hiddink's assistants at Australia were Dutch legend Johan Neeskens and former Australia international Graham Arnold.

The Socceroos defeated Japan 3–1 during their first game in the 2006 FIFA World Cup, with Tim Cahill scoring two goals (84', 89') and John Aloisi scoring one (92') all in the last eight minutes to claim their first World Cup goals and victory ever. An early controversial call by the Egyptian referee that awarded a goal to the Japanese team, despite an apparent foul to Australia goalkeeper Mark Schwarzer, had the Australians playing catch up until the last eight minutes. After scoring the first goal, Cahill was lucky to get away with a potential foul when he tripped Japan's Yūichi Komano, who had dribbled into the Australian penalty area. The referee missed the incident, and Cahill then broke to score the second on the counter. FIFA's spokesman for refereeing Andreas Werz said that while Japan's first goal was irregular, Egyptian referee Essam Abdel Fatah should also have given Japan a penalty.

Australia followed the match against Japan with a 2–0 loss to Brazil, meaning the Socceroos needed at least a draw against Croatia in their last group match to qualify for the knockout stages for the first time in its history. After a match fraught with controversy and erroneous decisions from referee Graham Poll, including an unprecedented three yellow cards given to the same Croatian player, ironically the Australian-born Josip Šimunić, the game ended 2–2, and the Socceroos had their draw thanks to a goal from Harry Kewell to level the game with minutes to spare.

In the second round, Italy beat Australia 1–0. After controversially sending off Italian defender Marco Materazzi in the 55th minute, Spanish referee Luis Medina Cantalejo awarded Italy's Fabio Grosso a controversial penalty kick eight seconds from the end of normal time, which was converted by Francesco Totti. This put Australia out of the World Cup, marking the official end of Hiddink's tenure as Australia's national coach.

=== Russia ===
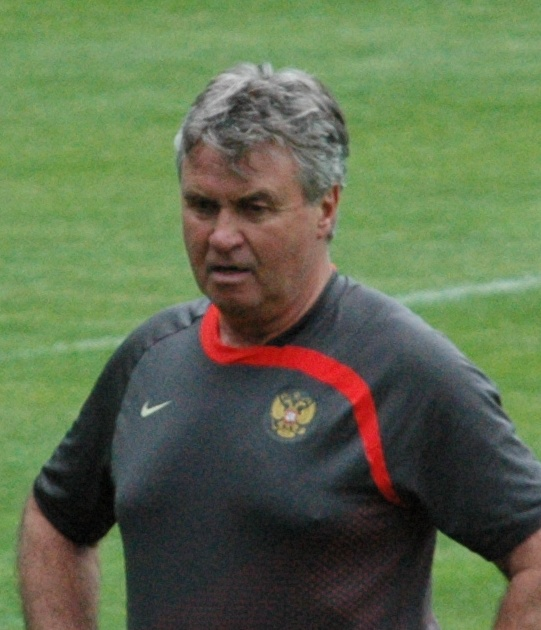
Hiddink managing the Russia national team

On 10 April 2006, Hiddink announced on Dutch television that he would take over as manager of the Russia national team. He signed a two-year contract in April 2006 worth €2 million a year. His duties for Russia started after managing Australia during the 2006 World Cup.

Russia's Euro 2008 qualification hopes came into question after a 2–1 loss to Israel. However, after a win against Andorra, and England losing out to Croatia on the last match day, Russia and Hiddink secured qualification for the final stages of Euro 2008. At the tournament, the Russians managed to reach the semi-finals with victories against the Netherlands in the quarter-finals and defending champions Greece in the group stage.

Piet de Visser, a former head scout of Hiddink's at PSV and later a personal assistant to Roman Abramovich at Chelsea, recommended Hiddink to the former Chelsea owner, following the departure of Avram Grant at the end of the 2007–08 Premier League season. In March 2008, however, Hiddink had already chosen to exercise the two-year extension with Russia, keeping him in the national team's head coaching role until 2010.

In November 2009, Russia was defeated by Slovenia in a 2010 World Cup qualifying play-off, casting doubt on future ambitions. On 13 February 2010, it was confirmed that Hiddink would leave the position when his contract expired on 30 June.

=== Chelsea ===
After the sacking of Chelsea's manager, the Brazilian Luiz Felipe Scolari, during the 2008–09 Premier League season, Chelsea confirmed on 11 February 2009 that Hiddink would become Scolari's replacement until the end of the season, whilst continuing his duties with Russia. Hiddink's first game in charge was a 1–0 away victory against Aston Villa at Villa Park. His first game in charge at Stamford Bridge was a 1–0 victory over Juventus in the Champions League knockout stage. Success continued in the form of a 3–1 away victory against Liverpool—commentators stated that Hiddink had rejuvenated Chelsea following Scolari's departure. After knocking Liverpool out of the competition, Hiddink went on to take Chelsea to the semi-finals of the Champions League, where the club was eliminated on the away goals rule after playing eventual winners Barcelona; a 93rd-minute Barça goal in a 1–1 controversial draw at Stamford Bridge, preceded by a 0–0 at the Camp Nou, sealed Chelsea's fate.

Hiddink only lost once during his tenure as Chelsea manager, a 1–0 loss to Tottenham Hotspur at White Hart Lane, where Luka Modrić scored the only goal of the match. As it turned out, even winning every league game in charge would not have been enough to see Hiddink secure the Premier League title. In the final home game of the season, in which Chelsea beat Blackburn Rovers 2–0, Chelsea home fans chanted Hiddink's name throughout the match and called for Chelsea owner Roman Abramovich to "sign him up" on a permanent basis. Hiddink's highly positive reception highlighted the Chelsea fans' appreciation of the manager. He marked an end to his Premier League campaign with a 3–2 away win over Sunderland.

In his last game as interim coach of Chelsea, he won the 2009 FA Cup by beating Everton 2–1 at Wembley. He was visibly pleased at winning the Cup, and in subsequent interviews said it was one of his biggest achievements. Even though throughout his tenure at Chelsea various players asked him to stay, including captain John Terry, Michael Ballack and Petr Čech, Hiddink always stated that he intended to return to his post with Russia. As a parting gift, the Chelsea players gave him an engraved watch and a shirt signed by all of the players.

=== Turkey ===
On 16 February 2010, Turkish Football Federation President Mahmut Özgener and Hiddink held talks in Amsterdam. Hiddink agreed to coach the Turkey national team after his contract with Russia expired on 30 June 2010. His contract with Turkey began on 1 August 2010, and his staff included assistant manager Oğuz Çetin and goalkeeping coach Engin İpekoğlu.

On 11 August 2010, Turkey defeated Romania, 2–0, in an international friendly in Istanbul. Emre Belözoğlu gave Turkey the lead in the 82nd minute after converting a spot kick, followed by Arda Turan doubling the scoreline after netting from 30 yards out. Hiddink resigned following Turkey's failure to qualify for Euro 2012 after losing 3–0 on aggregate to Croatia in the playoffs.

=== Anzhi Makhachkala ===
On 17 February 2012, Hiddink agreed an 18-month deal to manage Russian club Anzhi Makhachkala, his first permanent club post in six years. In his second season, he led the team to the bronze medal in the Russian Premier League, and Anzhi made it to the round of 16 of the UEFA Europa League for the first time. In the quarter-finals of the same competition, having gone down to ten men 55 minutes into the second leg against Newcastle United, Anzhi came close to going through when Mbark Boussoufa's free kick hit the post before Papiss Cissé headed home the winner in the last seconds of the tie, meaning the Magpies won 1–0 on aggregate. This was the second time that the English side have knocked out a team managed by Hiddink in the competition, having beaten his PSV side 3–2 on aggregate in the quarter-finals of the 2003–04 season. He announced his retirement at the end of the 2012–13 season on 28 November 2012, but later changed his mind.

On 11 June 2013, Hiddink decided to extend his contract by one more year at Anzhi. Just two games into the 2013–14 Russian Premier League season after a 2–1 defeat at Dynamo Moscow, however, he unexpectedly resigned on 22 July 2013. He said he left because he completed his mission, which he said was to develop Anzhi in a way that it could progress without him.

=== Return to the Netherlands ===
On 28 March 2014, it was announced that Hiddink would return to manage the Dutch national team after Louis van Gaal would step down following the 2014 World Cup. Hiddink agreed to manage the team up to UEFA Euro 2016, with Danny Blind and Ruud van Nistelrooy assisting him and Blind to eventually replace him. His second spell in charge of the team began with a 2–0 defeat to Italy in a friendly on 4 September 2014, with both goals conceded and a red card received within the first ten minutes of the match. Five days later, the Dutch began their UEFA Euro 2016 qualifying campaign with a 2–1 defeat away to the Czech Republic, a 3–1 victory against Kazakhstan and a 2–0 defeat in the hands of Iceland a month later.

The 2015 calendar year began in March with a match against Turkey, ending in a 1–1 draw. On 29 June 2015, Hiddink left his position. Two days later, he was succeeded by his assistant, Danny Blind. It was unknown for a long time whether Hiddink was fired or left his position voluntarily, but on 21 November 2015, he said, whilst on vacation in France, that he was fired from the post.

=== Return to Chelsea ===
On 19 December 2015, Hiddink was appointed first-team manager of English side Chelsea until the end of the 2015–16 season, following the dismissal of José Mourinho; he joined the club in the same capacity he did back in 2009. After being appointed as interim manager, Hiddink spoke, saying he was "excited to return to Stamford Bridge" and "I am looking forward to working with the players and staff at this great club and especially renewing my wonderful relationship with the Chelsea fans." After the home draw against Stoke City, Hiddink set a new record for the longest unbeaten streak as a new manager in the Premier League with 12 games unbeaten.

Chelsea ended the season in tenth place in the Premier League, climbing six positions from 16th upon Hiddink's arrival.

=== China U23 ===
On 10 September 2018, Hiddink took over the China Olympic team but was fired in September 2019 after a string of disappointing results, culminating with a 2–0 defeat against Vietnam. The coach of the Vietnamese team coincidentally was Park Hang-seo, assistant coach of South Korea's national team in the 2002 World Cup under Hiddink.

=== Curaçao and retirement ===
On 21 August 2020, Hiddink was appointed as manager of the Curaçao national team.

After failing to lead the nation to 2022 FIFA World Cup qualification, Hiddink contracted COVID-19 in 2021, prompting Patrick Kluivert to step in as interim manager of the team. On 9 September 2021, Hiddink officially stepped down as head coach of Curaçao and announced his managerial retirement at the age of 74.

Hiddink came out of retirement to assist his former Socceroos assistant Graham Arnold in Australia's two-match friendly series against New Zealand, for regular assistant coach René Meulensteen was scouting the Socceroos' Qatar 2022 opponents in Europe.

The temporary arrangement formed part of the Socceroos' centenary celebrations. Hiddink was on the Australian bench for their 1–0 win in Brisbane on 22 September 2022, and in Auckland three days later.

== Personal life ==
Hiddink was born to Gerrit Hiddink and Jo Prinsen and had 5 brothers, from which René and Karel also became professional footballers.

The De Graafschap mascot is named "Guus" in honor of Hiddink who was previously associated with the team as a player and as a manager.

In 2005, Hiddink received an honorary doctorate from the University of Seoul.

Hiddink was named an honorary citizen of Eindhoven after winning his sixth Eredivisie title with PSV in 2006.

Hiddink was put on a stamp by Australia Post following the 2006 FIFA World Cup.

=== Tax evasion ===
In February 2007, Hiddink was given a six-month suspended jail sentence and fined €45,000 after being found guilty of tax evasion by a Dutch court. Prosecutors had demanded a ten-month prison sentence for Hiddink, who was accused of evading €1.4 million in Dutch taxes by claiming to be a resident of Belgium from 2002 to 2003. The Dutch Tax Intelligence and Detection Service claimed that he had not spent enough nights at his Belgian house which he had stated was his primary address. Hiddink denied this accusation.

== Managerial statistics ==
Managerial record by team and tenure
Team	From	To	Record								Ref.
Team	From	To	Pld	W	D	L	GF	GA	GD	Win %	Ref.
PSV Eindhoven	16 March 1987	30 June 1990	153	104	28	21	401	137	+264	67.97	
Fenerbahçe	1 July 1990	13 March 1991	29	13	7	9	54	51	+3	44.83	
Valencia	1 July 1991	30 November 1993	112	56	26	30	189	121	+68	50.00	
Valencia	26 March 1994	30 June 1994	8	3	3	2	16	8	+8	37.50	
Netherlands	1 January 1995	12 July 1998	39	22	8	9	82	31	+51	56.41	
Real Madrid	10 July 1998	24 February 1999	34	20	4	10	74	47	+27	58.82	
Real Betis	1 February 2000	31 May 2000	16	3	6	7	13	22	−9	18.75	
South Korea	1 January 2001	8 July 2002	38	14	13	11	45	43	+2	36.84	
PSV Eindhoven	1 August 2002	30 June 2006	192	128	35	29	423	153	+270	66.67	(Note: References:)
Australia	22 July 2005	9 July 2006	13	8	2	3	28	11	+17	61.54	
Russia	10 July 2006	30 June 2010	39	22	7	10	66	34	+32	56.41	
Chelsea (caretaker)	16 February 2009	31 May 2009	22	16	5	1	41	19	+22	72.73	
Turkey	1 August 2010	16 November 2011	16	7	4	5	18	15	+3	43.75	
Anzhi Makhachkala	17 February 2012	22 July 2013	62	33	15	14	89	52	+37	53.23	
Netherlands	1 August 2014	30 June 2015	10	4	1	5	20	15	+5	40.00	
Chelsea (caretaker)	19 December 2015	15 May 2016	27	10	11	6	53	34	+19	37.04	
China U23	10 September 2018	20 September 2019	7	3	1	3	21	10	+11	42.86	
Curaçao	22 August 2020	9 September 2021	6	3	2	1	15	3	+12	50.00	
Total			823	469	178	176	1,648	806	+842	56.99	

== Honours ==
=== Player ===
De Graafschap

- Tweede Divisie: 1969

=== Manager ===
PSV Eindhoven

- Eredivisie: 1986–87, 1987–88, 1988–89, 2002–03, 2004–05, 2005–06
- KNVB Cup: 1987–88, 1988–89, 1989–90, 2004–05
- Johan Cruyff Shield: 2003
- European Cup: 1987–88

Real Madrid

- Intercontinental Cup: 1998

Russia

- UEFA European Championship third place: 2008 (Note: UEFA Euro 2008 semi-finalists were awarded bronze medals.)

Chelsea

- FA Cup: 2008–09

Individual

- Cheongnyong Medal: 2002
- AFC Coach of the Year: 2002
- World Soccer Manager of the Year: 2002
- Coach of the Year by Dutch Olympic Committee and Sports Federation: 2002, 2005
- Rinus Michels Award: 2004–05, 2005–06
- Rinus Michels Lifetime Achievement Award (Rinus Michels Oeuvreprijs): 2015
- Korean FA Hall of Fame: 2005
- KNVB Lifetime Achievement Award: 2007 (Note: Third winner behind Rinus Michels and Johan Cruijff)
- Honored Coach of Russia: 2008
- Sports Illustrated Team of the Decade: 2009

== See also ==
- List of FA Cup winning managers
