= René Hiddink =

Dutch footballer and coach

Rene Hiddink
Personal information
- Date of birth: 19 June 1955 (age 71)
- Place of birth: Varsseveld, Netherlands
- Position: Left winger

Senior career*
Years	Team	Apps	(Gls)
–1976	SC Varsseveld		
1976–1981	De Graafschap	105	(14)

Managerial career
- 2008–2010: Emma
- 2011–2012: APR FC (assistant)
- 2020–2021: Maldives (assistant)
- * Club domestic league appearances and goals

Rene Hiddink (born 19 June 1955) is a Dutch football coach and former player who has worked as assistant coach of the Maldives national team. Besides the Netherlands, he has managed in Rwanda, Ethiopia, Madagascar and the Maldives. He is a brother of Guus Hiddink.

== Playing career ==
A left winger, Hiddink started his senior career with SC Varsseveld. In 1976, he signed for De Graafschap in the Dutch Eredivisie, where he made over seven league appearances and scored one goal.

He was once called up for the Netherlands national under-19 football team, but did not come off the bench.

== Managerial career ==
Hiddink left his post as assistant manager at FC Dordrecht in 2011 to become assistant to Ernie Brandts at APR FC in Rwanda. In 2016 he was appointed manager of the Madagascar national under-17 football team and of Tana Formation football club. He became assistant to Maldives national team coach Martin Koopman in 2020 and later manager of their national team. He was dismissed in 2021 for financial reasons. He got stuck at the islands during the COVID-19 pandemic.

In 2023 he was named technical director of Ghanese powerhouse Hearts of Oak. He was dismissed by the club which led them to a FIFA-imposed transfer ban.
