= Karel Hiddink =

Dutch footballer and coach

Personal information
- Date of birth: 3 September 1956 (age 70)
- Place of birth: Varsseveld, Netherlands
- Position: Central defender

Youth career
- SC Varsseveld
- 1972–1975: De Graafschap
- 1975–1976: Groningen

Senior career*
Years	Team	Apps	(Gls)
1976-1985	Groningen	286	(7)
1985–1986	Veendam	34	(1)
1986–1988	De Graafschap	64	(2)
Total		384	(10)

International career
1971–1972	Netherlands U16	6	(0)

Managerial career
- 1988-1991: De Graafschap (assistant)
- 1992-1995: HSC '21
- 1995-1997: SV Rheden
- * Club domestic league appearances and goals

Karel Hiddink (born 3 September 1956) is a Dutch retired football player who played as a central defender.

== Playing career ==
=== Club ===
Born in Varsseveld, Hiddink had a lenghty spell at Groningen, with whom he clinched promotion to the Eredivisie in 1980. He was voted player of the year in the Eerste Divisie that year. He played in the 1983–84 UEFA Cup with them, famously beating Spanish giants Atlético Madrid in the first round and narrowly losing out to Italian powerhouse Inter Milan in the second. Hiddink captained the team at the time.

With Veendam he later also won promotion to the top tier.

In 2022 he was honoured by Groningen before a match agianst RKC as one of the club's all-time heroes.

=== International ===
Hiddink played 6 games for the Netherlands national under-16 football team.

== Managerial career ==
Hiddink worked as an assistant to managers Ben Zweers and Simon Kistemaker at De Graafschap and was head coach of amateur side SV Rheden.

== Personal life ==
Karel is a younger brother of Guus Hiddink.
