= Anton Janssen =

Dutch footballer and manager (born 1963)

Personal information
- Full name: Anton Janssen
- Date of birth: 10 August 1963 (age 63)
- Place of birth: Tiel, Netherlands
- Height: 1.86 m (6 ft 1 in)
- Position: Midfielder

Senior career*
Years	Team	Apps	(Gls)
1980–1982	Leones		
1982–1986	NEC	87	(9)
1986–1987	Fortuna Sittard	47	(7)
1987–1989	PSV	30	(4)
1989–1991	Kortrijk	60	(5)
1991–1994	Fortuna Sittard	97	(15)
1994–2001	NEC	187	(17)

Managerial career
- 2011–2012: VV Gemert
- 2012–2013: FC Oss
- 2013–2014: NEC
- 2015–2019: De Treffers
- * Club domestic league appearances and goals

Anton Janssen (born 10 August 1963) is a Dutch former football manager and player. He is mostly known for his tenure as a player for PSV Eindhoven where he was part of their European Cup victory in 1988.

== Playing career ==
In his youth, Janssen played for SV Leones from Beneden-Leeuwen, where he made his debut in the first team at the age of seventeen. Janssen played professional football from 1982 to 2000 with, in chronological order, NEC, Fortuna Sittard, PSV, Kortrijk, again Fortuna and finally again with NEC. His greatest personal achievement was the victory of the Europa Cup I with PSV in 1988 when he scored the decisive penalty-kick in the final against Benfica, after coming on as a substitute.

== Honours ==
=== Player ===
PSV

- Eredivisie: 1987–88, 1988–89
- KNVB Cup: 1987–88, 1988–89
- European Cup: 1987–88
