= Varsseveld =

- Village
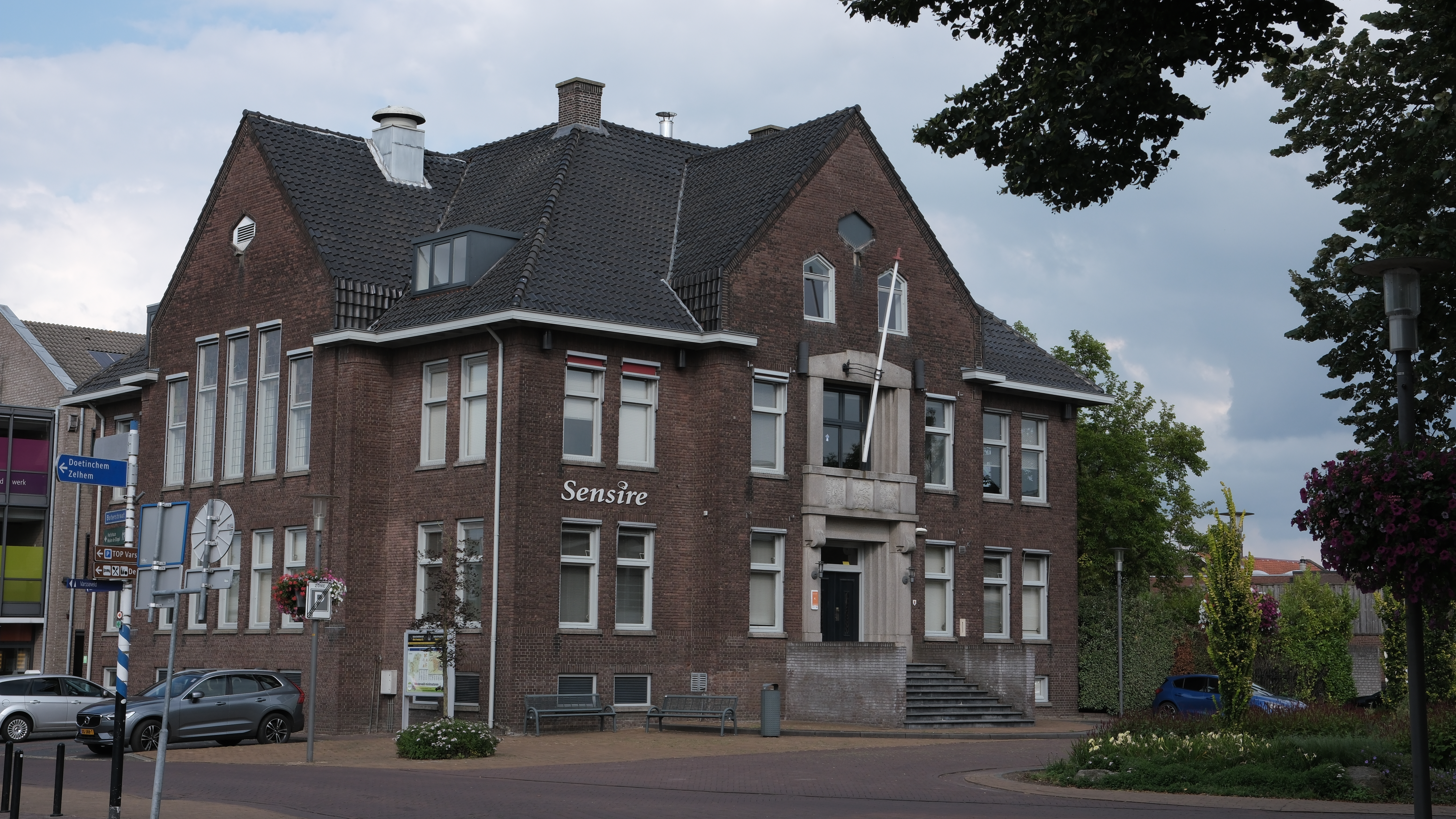
- former town hall

- Location in the Netherlands Varsseveld (Netherlands)
- Coordinates: 51°56′36″N 6°27′34″E
- Country: Netherlands
- Province: Gelderland
- Municipality: Oude IJsselstreek

Area
  - Total: 11.80 km^{2} (4.56 sq mi)
- Elevation: 19 m (62 ft)

Population (2021)
  - Total: 5,995
  - Density: 508.1/km^{2} (1,316/sq mi)
- Time zone: UTC+1 (CET)
  - Summer (DST): UTC+2 (CEST)
- Postal code: 7051
- Dialing code: 0315

Varsseveld is a town in the Netherlands, located in the Dutch municipality of Oude IJsselstreek.

== History ==
=== Middle Ages ===
At the start of the twelfth century, Varsseveld was part of the County of Lohn, a county within the Holy Roman Empire with its seat in Stadtlohn, nowadays Germany. Count Godschalk I of Lohn's son Goldschalk built an estate in the village. In 2009, during the reconstruction of the village core, archeologists found out that the village probably had a town canal at that time, similar to that of neighbouring estates and towns such as Bredevoort.

After the Battle for Bredevoort between 1326 and 1326, the village was conquered by Reginald II, Duke of Guelders and became under influence of the Duchy of Guelders. In 1723, a fire hit the village, burning down all the buildings, including the church. Until 1794, when Napoleon invaded the Netherlands and abolished the feudal system, the Guelders village was under the administration of the County of Zutphen and the smaller district of Wisch.

Upon the formation of the Kingdom of the Netherlands after the French rule had ended, Varsseveld was a separate municipality between 1812 and 1818, when it was merged with Wisch.

=== 1945 Rademakersbroek mass execution ===
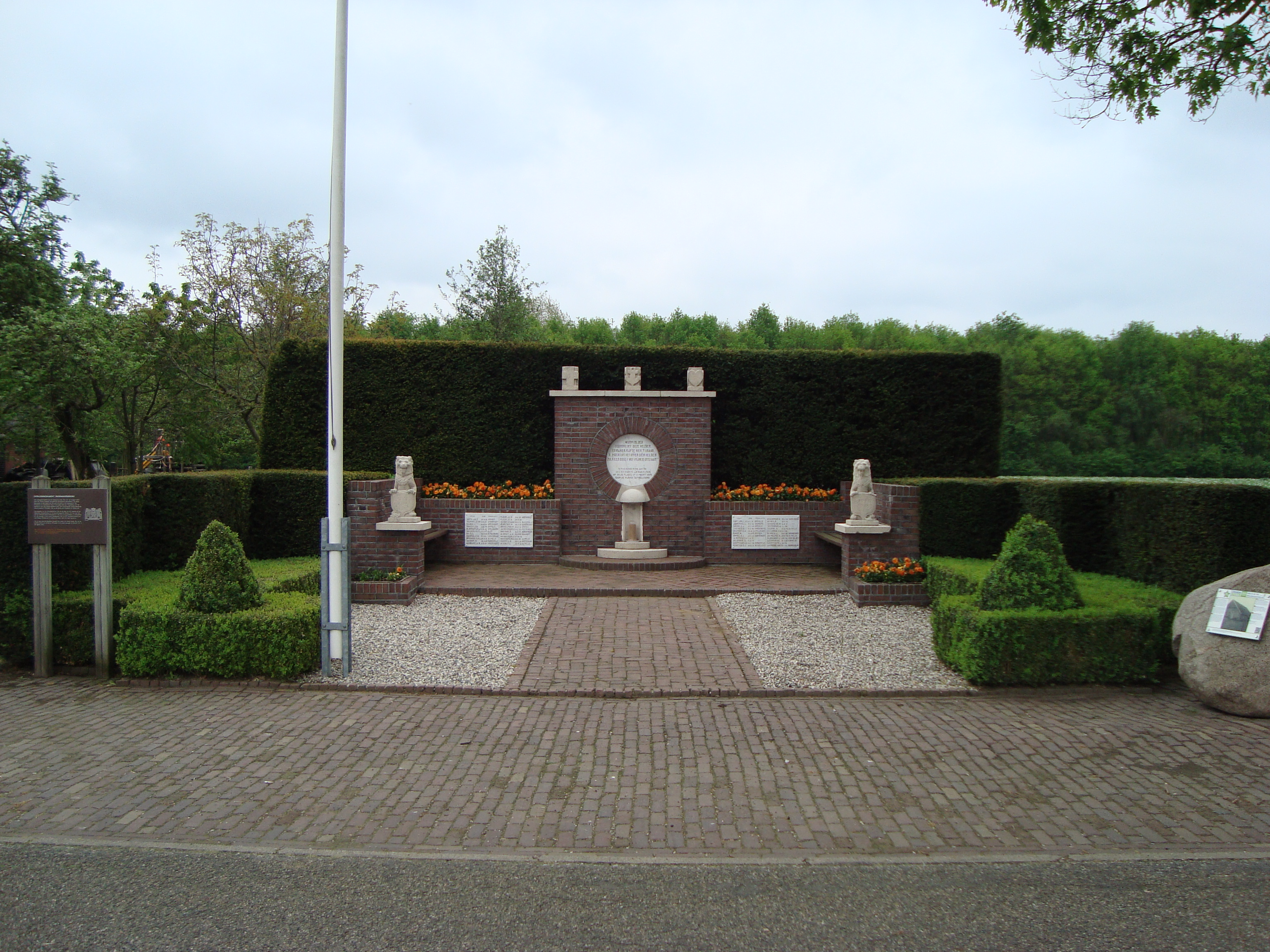
War memorial to the mass execution on Rademakersbroek.

On 2 March 1945, when the village was still under control of the Nazi Forces, a mass execution of 46 people took place on Rademakersbroek, a road just outside of the town. The victims had been chosen at random and had been taken from the Kruisberg prison in Doetinchem, where they had been imprisoned for numerous reasons, ranging from taking part in Resistance activities to unknowingly buying a stolen bike. The mass execution was a revenge attack in response to the earlier discovery of four dead Nazi officers in a semi-burnt vehicle near the village.

Four weeks later, on 31 March 1945, the village was liberated by Canadian forces.

=== After World War II ===
In the 1950s and 1960s, the village industrialised and became a regional leader in the production of wooden products such as doors, clogs, drawers and closets. This made the village relatively affluent during that time.

== Roman urban myth ==
Long time, Varsseveld held on to the urban myth that it had been a border town to the Roman Empire. A part of the myth centred around the interpretation of the etymology of the town's name. According to one local etymologist, Varsseveld had been derived from the Roman general Varus and "veld" (meaning "field"), pointing at the possibility that Varsseveld had been an important battleground in the Battle of the Teutoburg Forest.

In 1984, a twenty-five meters tall statue with a Roman helmet on top was erected in celebration of the newly constructed motorway Rijksweg 15, also referring to this story. Historians critiqued the use of the Roman helmet as the idea of Varus having set foot in Varsseveld was highly unlikely and stated that "Varsse" was derived from the word "vaars", meaning "young cow". In 2005, a study by the University of Osnabrück proved that it had been impossible for Varus to have fought anywhere near Varsseveld.

Another local belief that aided this urban myth is the existence of a rural road called Romienendiek in Aalten. In Low Saxon, Romienendiek could translate to Roman's dyke. However, the road was likely named after Rooi'je Mien, a local folklore figure.

== Sport ==
Varsseveld hosted the 2009 Dutch Sidecarcross Grand Prix, on 7 June.

Varsseveld hosted a Strongman contest, the Strongman Champions League Holland Grand Prix on June 1, 2008. The winner of the contest was Žydrūnas Savickas from Lithuania.

Football coach Guus Hiddink and cyclist Robert Gesink were born and raised in Varsseveld.

== Events ==
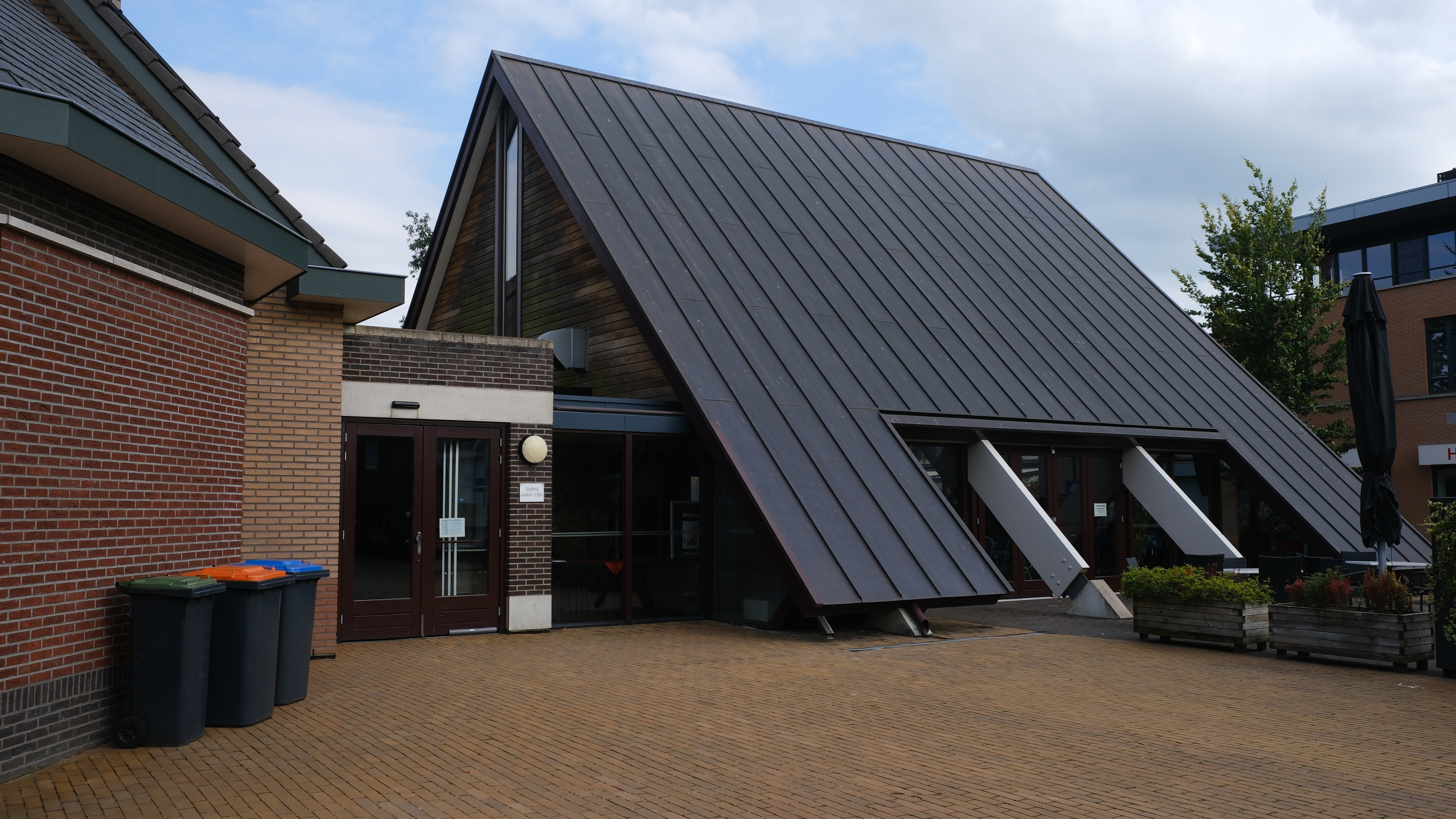
Culture house Borchuus

Annual events include:

- Nationale motorcross (May)
- Eeuwig Erbarmen Festival/’n drom (first Saturday in July)
- men-wedstrijden (July)
- Varssevelds Volksfeest (third weekend in August)
- Koetsentocht en Monicadag (July)
- Hootchie Koe festival (May)
- Goa dag
