= Gemeentelijk Sportpark Tilburg =

Stadium in Tilburg, Netherlands

- Location: Tilburg, Netherlands
- Capacity: 20.000 (peak)

Construction
- Groundbreaking: 1919
- Closed: 1992

Tenant
- Willem II

Gemeentelijk Sportpark Tilburg (Dutch pronunciation: [ɣəˈmeːntələk ˈspɔrtpɑr(ə)k ˈtɪlbʏr(ə)x], lit. 'Tilburg Municipal Sports Park') was a multi-use stadium in Tilburg, Netherlands. It was used mostly for football matches and hosted the home matches of Willem II. The stadium was able to hold 20.000 spectators at its peak. It was closed in 1995 when Koning Willem II Stadion opened.
