= 1987–88 KNVB Cup =

Tournament details
- Country: Netherlands
- Teams: 64

Final positions
- Champions: PSV
- Runners-up: Roda JC

Tournament statistics
- Top goal scorer: Ronald Koeman (4)

The 1987-88 KNVB Cup was the 70th edition of the Dutch national football annual knockout tournament for the KNVB Cup. 64 teams contested, beginning on 7 October 1987 and ending at the final on 12 May 1988.

PSV beat Roda JC 3–2 and won the cup for the fourth time.

== Teams ==
- All 18 participants of the Eredivisie 1987-88
- All 19 participants of the Eerste Divisie 1987-88
- 26 teams from lower (amateur) leagues
- One youth team

== First round ==
The matches of the first round were played between 7 and 13 October 1987.

Home team	Result	Away team
VV Rheden _{A}	0–3	Roda JC _{E}
ROHDA Raalte _{A}	1–2	SC Cambuur _{1}
Rijnsburgse Boys _{A}	1–7	Fortuna Sittard _{E}
SC Genemuiden _{A}	0–1	RBC _{1}
SC Heracles _{1}	2–0	sc Heerenveen _{1}
VV Serooskerke _{A}	2–3	NEC _{1}
SV Spakenburg _{A}	0–1 (aet)	MVV _{1}
Telstar _{1}	0–2	FC Volendam _{E}
TOP Oss _{A}	3–0	FC Utrecht _{E}
De Treffers _{A}	0–6	PSV _{E}
SV De Valleivogels _{A}	1–5	FC Den Haag _{E} (at FC Den Haag)
SV Venray _{A}	3–0	Vitesse Arnhem _{1}
VVOG _{A}	1–2	FC Eindhoven _{1}
FC Wageningen _{1}	3–1	NAC Breda _{1}
Wilhelmina '08 _{A}	1–5	FC Den Bosch _{E}
IJsselmeervogels _{A}	0–5	Willem II _{E}

Home team	Result	Away team
VV DWV _{A}	1–0	AZ _{E} (on September 20)
VV Germania _{A}	1–2	HFC Haarlem _{E} (on September 20)
Achilles'29 _{A}	1–4	PEC Zwolle _{E}
ACV _{A}	1–3	De Graafschap _{1}
Young Ajax	2–1	Sparta _{E}
DOS Kampen _{A}	2–1	Go Ahead Eagles _{1}
VV DOVO _{A}	0–7	FC Twente _{E}
VV Drachtster Boys _{A}	0–7	DS '79 _{E}
HFC EDO _{A}	1–4	VVV _{E}
FC Emmen _{1}	1–3	Feyenoord _{E}
VV Geldrop/AEK _{A}	0–1	SC Veendam _{1}
VV Heerjansdam_{A}	0–2	FC Groningen _{E}
Helmond Sport _{1}	0–1	Excelsior _{1}
NSVV _{A}	1–2	RKC Waalwijk _{1}
Quick Boys _{A}	0–7	Ajax _{E}
RCH _{A}	2–4	SVV _{1}

_{E} Eredivisie; _{1} Eerste Divisie; _{A} Amateur teams

== Second round ==
The matches of the second round were played on November 14 and 15, 1987.

Home team	Result	Away team
RKC Waalwijk	2–1	SC Veendam
Roda JC	2–0	FC Eindhoven
SVV	4–3	De Graafschap
SV Venray	0–1 (aet)	DS '79
VVV	2–2 (p: 4–3)	HFC Haarlem
FC Wageningen	3–3 (p: 2–3)	FC Volendam
Willem II	4–2 (aet)	FC Twente
TOP Oss	0–2	Feyenoord (on November 29)

Home team	Result	Away team
Young Ajax	3–1	FC Groningen
DOS Kampen	1–3	NEC
VV DWV	0–3	Fortuna Sittard
Excelsior	5–0	SC Heracles
FC Den Bosch	1–0	Ajax
FC Den Haag	2–0	PEC Zwolle
MVV	1–3	PSV
RBC	2–1 (aet)	SC Cambuur

== Round of 16 ==
The matches of the round of 16 were played on February 10, 12, 14 and March 30, 1988.

Home team	Result	Away team
Roda JC	2–0	Fortuna Sittard
Excelsior	0–6	RKC Waalwijk
SVV	1–2 (aet)	RBC
FC Den Haag	0–4	Feyenoord
FC Volendam	2–3	Young Ajax
FC Den Bosch	0–1 (aet)	PSV
NEC	0–2	Willem II
VVV	2–0	DS '79

== Quarter finals ==
The quarter finals were played on April 13, 1988.

Home team	Result	Away team
PSV	2–0	RBC
RKC Waalwijk	2–1	Young Ajax
VVV	2–1	Feyenoord
Willem II	1–3 (aet)	Roda JC

== Semi-finals ==
The semi-finals were played on April 26, 1988.

Home team	Result	Away team
RKC Waalwijk	2–3	PSV
Roda JC	3–1 (aet)	VVV

== Final ==
12 May 1988

PSV	3–2 (a.e.t.)	Roda JC
Gerets 52', 85'; Lerby 92'		H. Smeets 22'; R. Smeets 64'

Gemeentelijk Sportpark Tilburg, Tilburg
Attendance: 8,500
Referee: Cor Verhoef

PSV also won the Dutch Eredivisie championship, thereby taking the double. They would participate in the European Cup, so Roda JC could play in the Cup Winners' Cup.
