= 1987–88 Eredivisie =

32nd season of the Eredivisie

Eredivisie
- Season: 1987–88
- Champions: PSV Eindhoven (10th title)
- Promoted: Willem II; FC Volendam; DS '79
- Relegated: AZ; FC Den Haag; DS '79
- European Cup: PSV
- Cup Winners' Cup: Roda JC
- UEFA Cup: Ajax; FC Groningen
- Goals: 963
- Average goals/game: 3.14
- Top goalscorer: (Netherlands) Wim Kieft; PSV Eindhoven 29 goals

The Dutch Eredivisie in the 1987–88 season was contested by 18 teams. PSV Eindhoven won the championship.

== League standings ==
Pos	Team	Pld	W	D	L	GF	GA	GD	Pts	Qualification or relegation
1	PSV	34	27	5	2	117	28	+89	59	Entered 1988–89 European Cup (Note: PSV Eindhoven competed in the 1988–89 European Cup as defending champions.)
2	Ajax	34	23	4	7	78	40	+38	50	Qualified for 1988–89 UEFA Cup
3	FC Twente	34	16	9	9	63	40	+23	41	Qualified for Play-offs for 1988–89 UEFA Cup
4	Willem II	34	14	10	10	60	46	+14	38	Qualified for Play-offs for 1988–89 UEFA Cup
5	VVV	34	13	12	9	43	35	+8	38	Qualified for Play-offs for 1988–89 UEFA Cup
6	Feyenoord	34	14	8	12	63	57	+6	36	
7	FC Den Bosch	34	15	6	13	46	46	0	36	
8	Fortuna Sittard	34	11	13	10	51	48	+3	35	
9	Haarlem	34	14	6	14	42	46	−4	34	
10	FC Utrecht	34	11	11	12	41	55	−14	33	
11	FC Groningen (O)	34	13	6	15	54	52	+2	32	Qualified for Play-offs for 1988–89 UEFA Cup
12	Sparta	34	12	8	14	44	50	−6	32	
13	PEC Zwolle	34	10	9	15	40	64	−24	29	
14	FC Volendam	34	10	9	15	40	66	−26	29	
15	Roda JC	34	10	8	16	46	54	−8	28	Qualified for 1988–89 UEFA Cup Winners' Cup (Note: PSV also won the KNVB Cup, thereby taking the double. Therefore, beaten finalists Roda JC would play in the Cup Winners' Cup.)
16	AZ	34	9	10	15	44	64	−20	28	Relegated to Eerste Divisie
17	FC Den Haag	34	7	8	19	50	72	−22	22	Relegated to Eerste Divisie
18	DS '79	34	2	8	24	41	100	−59	12	Relegated to Eerste Divisie

Source: rsssf.com
(O) Play-off winners

== Results ==
Home \ Away	AJA	AZ	DBO	DS	FEY	FSI	GRO	DHA	HFC	PEC	PSV	RJC	SPA	TWE	UTR	VOL	VVV	WIL
Ajax		3–0	4–0	5–3	3–1	4–0	2–1	4–2	3–1	6–4	0–1	1–0	4–0	6–1	1–0	2–1	1–0	3–1
AZ	1–2		0–1	2–1	2–2	1–1	5–1	3–1	2–2	2–2	0–4	4–1	1–1	2–0	3–1	1–1	0–0	0–0
FC Den Bosch '67	0–2	2–1		1–0	3–1	1–1	2–3	1–0	0–1	1–1	0–2	1–0	0–0	2–1	1–0	0–1	0–0	3–1
DS '79	1–3	1–1	1–4		1–1	1–5	0–4	0–3	2–2	2–2	0–4	4–4	1–2	4–1	1–2	0–1	3–3	1–2
Feyenoord	1–3	7–2	1–4	8–2		2–1	3–2	3–1	0–1	0–1	2–1	2–0	5–1	3–3	1–3	1–2	0–2	3–2
Fortuna Sittard	3–3	3–0	3–2	4–1	1–2		4–2	2–1	1–2	0–2	2–4	0–0	1–3	1–0	1–1	0–0	1–1	2–2
FC Groningen	2–1	4–2	1–2	1–1	2–0	1–2		2–1	4–0	3–1	2–0	2–2	0–0	0–0	2–0	0–1	1–2	1–4
FC Den Haag	1–1	4–1	2–3	4–2	2–2	3–1	0–3		0–3	2–1	1–1	5–0	1–1	0–3	1–1	1–3	0–0	0–0
FC Haarlem	0–0	0–2	2–1	2–0	1–2	0–0	0–1	5–1		0–2	1–2	2–1	1–0	1–5	0–1	4–1	1–0	1–3
PEC Zwolle '82	2–0	1–2	3–2	2–1	1–1	0–0	1–0	1–0	0–1		0–6	0–3	2–1	1–2	2–2	0–0	2–0	1–4
PSV	4–2	1–0	6–1	7–0	3–1	2–2	4–1	9–1	1–0	5–1		2–1	6–2	2–2	9–0	4–1	5–0	3–1
Roda JC	0–3	3–0	0–1	4–1	1–1	0–2	2–1	2–1	4–1	2–0	1–1		1–3	0–1	3–0	2–1	0–0	2–1
Sparta Rotterdam	2–0	0–1	3–1	3–1	1–1	1–1	1–2	2–1	1–0	0–0	0–2	1–0		1–5	6–2	4–0	0–1	2–1
FC Twente	1–1	5–0	1–1	7–1	0–0	0–1	2–1	4–1	1–2	3–0	2–3	1–0	1–0		1–0	2–0	1–1	1–0
FC Utrecht	2–1	3–2	2–2	2–0	0–1	2–1	2–2	1–1	2–0	2–2	0–0	4–1	0–0	3–2		0–0	1–0	1–1
FC Volendam	1–2	1–1	0–3	1–1	1–2	0–2	1–1	1–5	0–0	3–1	1–6	5–4	2–1	1–3	3–1		3–3	1–5
VVV	3–1	2–0	1–0	1–3	2–0	3–1	1–0	3–2	1–3	5–0	0–1	0–0	2–1	0–0	3–0	1–2		1–1
Willem II	0–1	3–0	1–0	2–0	2–3	1–1	3–1	3–1	2–2	3–1	0–6	2–2	3–0	1–1	1–0	3–0	1–1	

Legend: Blue = home team win; Yellow = draw; Red = away team win.

== Play-offs ==
This year, play-offs were held for one UEFA-Cup spot.

Pos	Team	Pld	W	D	L	GF	GA	GD	Pts	Qualification
1	FC Groningen	6	2	3	1	7	5	+2	7	Qualified for 1988–89 UEFA Cup.
2	Willem II	6	2	2	2	9	8	+1	6	
3	FC Twente	6	2	2	2	8	9	−1	6	
4	VVV-Venlo	6	2	1	3	7	9	−2	5	

== Attendances ==
PSV drew the highest average home attendance in the Dutch top-flight football league.

#	Football club	Home games	Average attendance
1	PSV	17	21,512
2	AFC Ajax	17	10,830
3	Feyenoord	17	9,855
4	Willem II	17	8,347
5	VVV	17	8,335
6	FC Groningen	17	7,930
7	FC Twente	17	6,500
8	Fortuna Sittard	17	5,491
9	FC Utrecht	17	5,197
10	Roda JC	17	5,088
11	FC Den Haag	17	4,886
12	Sparta Rotterdam	17	4,853
13	FC Volendam	17	4,791
14	PEC Zwolle	17	4,524
15	AZ	17	3,890
16	FC Den Bosch	17	3,882
17	HFC Haarlem	17	2,729
18	DS '79	17	2,282

== See also ==
- 1987–88 Eerste Divisie
- 1987–88 KNVB Cup
