= 2023–24 AS Roma season =

Roma
2023–24 season
- President: Dan Friedkin
- Head coach: José Mourinho (until 16 January); Daniele De Rossi (from 16 January)
- Stadium: Stadio Olimpico
- Serie A: 6th
- Coppa Italia: Quarter-finals
- UEFA Europa League: Semi-finals
- Top goalscorer: League: Paulo Dybala; Romelu Lukaku (13 each); All: Romelu Lukaku (21)
Home colours	Away colours	Third colours

The 2023–24 season was the 97th season in the history of Roma and their 72nd consecutive season in the top flight. The club participated in Serie A, the Coppa Italia and the UEFA Europa League.

On 16 January 2024, head coach José Mourinho was terminated from his position after two and a half years at the club, following elimination from the Coppa Italia at the hands of rivals Lazio, with Roma sitting ninth in the league table. He was replaced by former club captain Daniele De Rossi on a contract until the end of the season. On 18 April, owners Dan and Ryan Friedkin announced their intention to retain De Rossi as manager "for the foreseeable future". General manager Tiago Pinto likewise left the club by mutual consent on 3 February 2024.

Roma drew an average home attendance of 62,924 in 19 home games in the 2023–24 league season. In June 2024, Roma was among the most-followed sports clubs in the world, with 36.4 million followers on social media.

== Squad information ==
No.	Player	Nat.	Position(s)	Date of birth (age)	Signed from	Signed in	Contract ends	Apps.	Goals
Goalkeepers
1	Rui Patrício	(Portugal)	GK	15 February 1988 (aged 36)	(England) Wolverhampton Wanderers	2021	2024	129	0
63	Pietro Boer	(Italy)	GK	12 May 2002 (aged 22)	(Italy) Roma Primavera	2021	2024	1	0
99	Mile Svilar	(Serbia)	GK	27 August 1999 (aged 24)	(Portugal) Benfica	2022	2027	34	0
Defenders
2	Rick Karsdorp	(Netherlands)	RB / RM	11 February 1995 (aged 29)	(Netherlands) Feyenoord	2017	2025	157	1
3	Dean Huijsen	(Spain)	CB	23 November 2005 (aged 18)	(Italy) Juventus (loan)	2024	2024	14	2
5	Evan Ndicka	(Ivory Coast)	CB / LB	20 August 1999 (aged 24)	(Germany) Eintracht Frankfurt	2023	2028	34	0
6	Chris Smalling	(England)	CB	22 November 1989 (aged 34)	(England) Manchester United	2019	2024	155	10
14	Diego Llorente	(Spain)	CB	9 November 1997 (aged 26)	(England) Leeds United (loan)	2023	2024	53	1
19	Zeki Çelik	(Turkey)	RB	17 February 1997 (aged 27)	(France) Lille	2022	2026	63	0
23	Gianluca Mancini (vc)	(Italy)	CB	17 April 1996 (aged 28)	(Italy) Atalanta	2019	2027	228	15
37	Leonardo Spinazzola	(Italy)	LB / LWB	25 March 1993 (aged 31)	(Italy) Juventus	2019	2024	151	7
43	Rasmus Kristensen	(Denmark)	RB / CB	11 July 1997 (aged 26)	(England) Leeds United (loan)	2023	2024	31	1
69	Angeliño	(Spain)	LB / LWB	4 January 1997 (aged 27)	(Germany) RB Leipzig (loan)	2024	2024	20	0
Midfielders
4	Bryan Cristante	(Italy)	DM / CM	3 March 1995 (aged 29)	(Italy) Atalanta	2018	2027	280	15
7	Lorenzo Pellegrini (c)	(Italy)	AM / CM	19 June 1996 (aged 28)	(Italy) Sassuolo	2017	2026	281	52
16	Leandro Paredes	(Argentina)	CM / DM	29 June 1994 (aged 30)	(France) Paris Saint-Germain	2023	2025	103	9
20	Renato Sanches	(Portugal)	CM / AM	18 August 1997 (aged 26)	(France) Paris Saint-Germain (loan)	2023	2024	12	0
22	Houssem Aouar	(Algeria)	AM	30 June 1998 (aged 26)	(France) Lyon	2023	2028	25	4
35	Tommaso Baldanzi	(Italy)	AM	23 March 2003 (aged 21)	(Italy) Empoli	2024	2029	18	0
52	Edoardo Bove	(Italy)	DM / CM	16 May 2002 (aged 22)	(Italy) Roma Primavera	2021	2028	92	4
Forwards
9	Tammy Abraham	(England)	CF	2 October 1997 (aged 26)	(England) Chelsea	2021	2026	119	37
17	Sardar Azmoun	(Iran)	CF	1 January 1995 (aged 29)	(Germany) Bayer Leverkusen (loan)	2023	2024	29	3
21	Paulo Dybala	(Argentina)	CF	15 November 1993 (aged 30)	(Italy) Juventus	2022	2025	77	34
59	Nicola Zalewski	(Poland)	LW	23 January 2002 (aged 22)	(Italy) Roma Primavera	2021	2025	106	2
90	Romelu Lukaku	(Belgium)	CF	13 May 1993 (aged 31)	(England) Chelsea (loan)	2023	2024	47	21
92	Stephan El Shaarawy	(Italy)	LW	27 October 1992 (aged 31)	(China) Shanghai Shenhua	2021	2025	279	61

=== Out on loan ===
Note: Flags indicate national team as defined under FIFA eligibility rules; some limited exceptions apply. Players may hold more than one non-FIFA nationality.

No.	Pos.	Nation	Player
—	GK	ITA	Davide Mastrantonio (at Pro Vercelli until 30 June 2024)
—	DF	ITA	Matteo Pellegrini (at Matera until 30 June 2024)
—	MF	GAM	Ebrima Darboe (at LASK until 30 June 2024)

No.	Pos.	Nation	Player
—	FW	UZB	Eldor Shomurodov (at Cagliari until 30 June 2024)
—	FW	NOR	Ola Solbakken (at Urawa Red Diamonds until 30 June 2024)

== Transfers ==
=== In ===
No.	Pos.	Player	Transferred from	Fee	Date	Source
22	MF	(Algeria) Houssem Aouar	(France) Lyon	Free transfer	1 July 2023	
5	DF	(Ivory Coast) Evan Ndicka	(Germany) Eintracht Frankfurt	Free transfer	1 July 2023	
	FW	(Argentina) Ricardo Solbes	(Argentina) Defensa y Justicia		10 August 2023	
16	MF	(Argentina) Leandro Paredes	(France) Paris Saint-Germain	€2.5M	16 August 2023	
35	MF	(Italy) Tommaso Baldanzi	(Italy) Empoli	€10M + €5M add-ons	1 February 2024	

==== Loans in ====
No.	Pos.	Player	Transferred from	Fee	Date	Source
14	DF	(Spain) Diego Llorente	(England) Leeds United	Loan extended	8 July 2023	
43	DF	(Denmark) Rasmus Kristensen	(England) Leeds United	Loan	14 July 2023	
20	MF	(Portugal) Renato Sanches	(France) Paris Saint-Germain	Loan fee €1M	16 August 2023	
17	FW	(Iran) Sardar Azmoun	(Germany) Bayer Leverkusen	Loan	26 August 2023	
90	FW	(Belgium) Romelu Lukaku	(England) Chelsea	Loan fee €5.8M	31 August 2023	
3	DF	(Spain) Dean Huijsen	(Italy) Juventus	Loan	6 January 2024	
69	DF	(Spain) Angeliño	(Germany) RB Leipzig	Loan	30 January 2024	

=== Out ===
No.	Pos.	Player	Transferred to	Fee	Date	Source
20	MF	(Guinea) Mady Camara	(Greece) Olympiacos	End of loan	1 July 2023	
25	MF	(Netherlands) Georginio Wijnaldum	(France) Paris Saint-Germain	End of loan	1 July 2023	
92	MF	(Bosnia and Herzegovina) Benjamin Tahirović	(Netherlands) Ajax	€7.5M	1 July 2023	
—	FW	(Netherlands) Justin Kluivert	(England) Bournemouth	€11.2M	1 July 2023	
58	DF	(Italy) Filippo Missori	(Italy) Sassuolo	€2.5M	1 July 2023	
62	MF	(Italy) Cristian Volpato	(Italy) Sassuolo	€7.5M	1 July 2023	
	FW	(Spain) Carles Pérez	(Spain) Celta Vigo	€5.2M	1 July 2023	
	FW	(France) Ruben Providence	(Austria) TSV Hartberg	€300K	1 July 2023	
	MF	(Croatia) Ante Ćorić	Unattached	Free transfer	1 July 2023	
	DF	(France) William Bianda	Unattached	Free transfer	1 July 2023	
—	MF	(United States) Bryan Reynolds	(Belgium) KVC Westerlo	€3.5M	30 July 2023	
—	MF	(Spain) Gonzalo Villar	(Spain) Granada	€1.8M	4 August 2023	
3	DF	(Brazil) Roger Ibañez	(Saudi Arabia) Al-Ahli	€30M	10 August 2023	
8	MF	(Serbia) Nemanja Matić	(France) Rennes	€2.5M	14 August 2023	
—	DF	(Uruguay) Matías Viña	(Brazil) Flamengo	€8.1M	26 January 2024	

==== Loans out ====
No.	Pos.	Player	Transferred to	Fee	Date	Source
55	MF	(The Gambia) Ebrima Darboe	(Austria) LASK	Loan	7 July 2023	
14	FW	(Uzbekistan) Eldor Shomurodov	(Italy) Cagliari	Loan fee €1M with option to buy	27 July 2023	
5	DF	(Uruguay) Matías Viña	(Italy) Sassuolo	Loan with option to buy	31 July 2023	
—	GK	(Italy) Davide Mastrantonio	(Italy) Monterosi	Loan	31 July 2023	
18	FW	(Norway) Ola Solbakken	(Greece) Olympiacos	Loan fee €1.5M	2 September 2023	
—	FW	(Norway) Ola Solbakken	(Japan) Urawa Red Diamonds	Loan	12 January 2024	
11	FW	(Italy) Andrea Belotti	(Italy) Fiorentina	Loan	1 February 2024	
24	DF	(Albania) Marash Kumbulla	(Italy) Sassuolo	Loan	1 February 2024	
—	MF	(The Gambia) Ebrima Darboe	(Italy) Sampdoria	Loan	1 February 2024	

== Pre-season and friendlies ==
Win Draw Loss Fixtures

26 July 2023 Asia-Pacific Tour	Roma (Italy)	Cancelled	(England) Tottenham Hotspur	Kallang, Singapore
19:30 SGT (UTC+8)				Stadium: National Stadium
Note: Roma withdrew from the tour due to financial and logistical obligations not being met.

26 July 2023 Friendly	Roma (Italy)	1–1	(Portugal) Braga	Albufeira, Portugal
20:00 WEST (UTC+1)	Cristante (yellow card) 28'; El Shaarawy 32'; Ibañez (yellow card) 89'	Report	Fonte (yellow card) 60'; Niakaté (yellow card) 68'; Bruma 86'	Stadium: Estadio Municipal de Albufeira; Attendance: 2,000; Referee: Bruno Vieira (Portugal)

29 July 2023 Asia-Pacific Tour	Roma (Italy)	Cancelled	(England) Wolverhampton Wanderers	Incheon, South Korea
20:00 KST (UTC+9)				Stadium: Incheon Asiad Main Stadium
Note: Roma withdrew from the tour due to financial and logistical obligations not being met.

29 July 2023 Friendly	Estrela da Amadora (Portugal)	0–4	(Italy) Roma	Albufeira, Portugal
20:45 WEST (UTC+1)	Ronald (yellow card) 29'; Jean Felipe (yellow card) 52'; Aloísio (yellow card) 69'	Report	Ndicka (yellow card) 33'; Dybala 42', 44'; Llorente 72'; Bove 75'; Mancini (yellow card) 79'	Stadium: Estadio Municipal de Albufeira; Attendance: 200; Referee: Gonçalo Neves (Portugal)

1 August 2023 Asia-Pacific Tour	Incheon United (South Korea)	Cancelled	(Italy) Roma	Incheon, South Korea
00:00 KST (UTC+9)				Stadium: Incheon Munhak Stadium
Note: Roma withdrew from the tour due to financial and logistical obligations not being met.

2 August 2023 Friendly	Farense (Portugal)	2–4	(Italy) Roma	Faro, Portugal
19:45 WEST (UTC+1)	Kristensen 67' (o.g.); Maxuel 90+3'	Report	Belotti 3', 33'; Pellegrini 42'; Silva 90' (o.g.)	Stadium: Estádio de São Luís

6 August 2023 Friendly	Toulouse (France)	2–1	(Italy) Roma	Toulouse, France
19:30 CEST (UTC+2)	Dallinga 5'; Aboukhlal (yellow card) 74'; Begraoui 90'	Report	Dybala 26'; Çelik (yellow card) 69'; Pellegrini (yellow card) 74'; Cristante (yellow card) 90+2'	Stadium: Stadium de Toulouse; Attendance: 29,204; Referee: Eric Wattelier (France)

12 August 2023 Friendly	Partizani (Albania)	1–2	(Italy) Roma	Tirana, Albania
20:00 CEST (UTC+2)	Grezda (yellow card) 38'; Cara 85' (pen.)	Report	El Shaarawy 12'; Belotti 26'	Stadium: Arena Kombëtare; Attendance: 15,000; Referee: Juxhin Xhaja (Albania)

24 January 2024 Friendly	Al-Shabab (Saudi Arabia)	1–2	(Italy) Roma	Riyadh, Saudi Arabia
19:45 SAST (UTC+3)	Carrasco 78'	Report	Golič (yellow card) 34'; Costa 54'; Lukaku 85'	Stadium: KSU Stadium; Attendance: 10,000; Referee: Mohammed Al-Harbi (Saudi Arabia)

31 May 2024 Friendly	Milan (Italy)	2–5	(Italy) Roma	Perth, Australia
19:10 AWST (UTC+8)	Hernandez 37'; Okafor 55'	Report	Baldanzi 27'; Abraham 45+2'; Angeliño 54'; Dybala 57'; Azmoun 77'	Stadium: Perth Stadium; Attendance: 56,522; Referee: Alireza Faghani (Australia)

== Competitions ==
=== Overall record ===
Competition	First match	Last match	Starting round	Final position	Record							
Competition	First match	Last match	Starting round	Final position	Pld	W	D	L	GF	GA	GD	Win %
Serie A	20 August 2023	26 May 2024	Matchday 1	6th	38	18	9	11	65	46	+19	47.37
Coppa Italia	3 January 2024	10 January 2024	Round of 16	Quarter-finals	2	1	0	1	2	2	+0	50.00
UEFA Europa League	21 September 2023	9 May 2024	Group stage	Semi-finals	14	7	4	3	23	12	+11	50.00
Total					54	26	13	15	90	60	+30	48.15

Source: Soccerway

=== Serie A ===
==== League table ====
Pos	Team	Pld	W	D	L	GF	GA	GD	Pts	Qualification or relegation
4	Atalanta	38	21	6	11	72	42	+30	69	Qualification for the Champions League league phase (Note: Serie A gained an additional Champions League place as a result of Italy finishing as one of the two associations with the highest coefficient points in 2023–24.)
5	Bologna	38	18	14	6	54	32	+22	68	Qualification for the Champions League league phase
6	Roma	38	18	9	11	65	46	+19	63	Qualification for the Europa League league phase (Note: Since the winners of the 2023–24 Coppa Italia, Juventus, qualified for the Champions League, the Europa League berth awarded to the Coppa Italia winners was passed to the seventh-placed team, and the Conference League berth was passed to the eighth-placed team.)
7	Lazio	38	18	7	13	49	39	+10	61	Qualification for the Europa League league phase
8	Fiorentina	38	17	9	12	61	46	+15	60	Qualification for the Conference League play-off round

Source: Serie A
Rules for classification: 1) Points; 2) Tiebreaker for Champions team and third relegated team; 3) Head-to-head points; 4) Head-to-head goal difference; 5) Goal difference; 6) Goals scored; 7) Draw.
(Note: Head-to-head record is used only after all the matches between the teams in question have been played)

==== Results summary ====
Overall								Home						Away					
Pld	W	D	L	GF	GA	GD	Pts	W	D	L	GF	GA	GD	W	D	L	GF	GA	GD
38	18	9	11	65	46	+19	63	12	4	3	38	19	+19	6	5	8	27	27	0

Source: Serie A

==== Results by round ====
Round	1	2	3	4	5	6	7	8	9	10	11	12	13	14	15	16	17	18	19	20	21	22	23	24	25	26	27	28	29	30	31	32	33	34	35	36	37	38
Ground	H	A	H	H	A	A	H	A	H	A	H	A	H	A	H	A	H	A	H	A	H	A	H	H	A	H	A	A	H	A	H	A	H	A	H	A	H	A
Result	D	L	L	W	D	L	W	W	W	L	W	D	W	W	D	L	W	W	W	L	W	W	W	L	W	W	W	D	W	D	W	W	L	W	D	L	W	W
Position	9	13	18	12	13	16	13	10	7	9	7	7	5	4	4	8	6	7	8	9	7	5	5	6	6	6	5	5	5	5	5	5	5	5	6	6	6	6

Source: Serie A
A = Away; H = Home; W = Win; D = Draw; L = Loss

==== Matches ====
The league fixtures were announced on 5 July 2023.

20 August 2023 1	Roma	2–2	Salernitana	Rome
18:30 CEST (UTC+2)	Belotti 17', 82'	Report	Candreva 36', 49'; Gyömbér (yellow card) 41'; Maggiore (yellow card) 67'; Kastanos (yellow card) 69'; Fazio (yellow card) 83'	Stadium: Stadio Olimpico; Attendance: 62,050; Referee: Ermanno Feliciani

26 August 2023 2	Hellas Verona	2–1	Roma	Verona
20:45 CEST (UTC+2)	Duda 4'; Ngonge 45+3'; Dawidowicz (yellow card) 64'; Hien (red card) 84'	Report	Dybala (yellow card) 13'; Aouar 56', (yellow card) 62'; Pellegrini (yellow card) 68'	Stadium: Stadio Marcantonio Bentegodi; Attendance: 23,147; Referee: Daniele Doveri

1 September 2023 3	Roma	1–2	Milan	Rome
20:45 CEST (UTC+2)	Paredes (yellow card) 70'; Lukaku (yellow card) 85'; Spinazzola 90+2'	Report	Giroud 9' (pen.); Tomori (yellow card) 19' (yellow-red card) 61'; Loftus-Cheek (yellow card) 34'; Leão 48'; Okafor (yellow card) 90+7'	Stadium: Stadio Olimpico; Attendance: 61,690; Referee: Antonio Rapuano

17 September 2023 4	Roma	7–0	Empoli	Rome
20:45 CEST (UTC+2)	Dybala 2' (pen.), 55', (yellow card) 38'; Sanches 8', (yellow card) 39'; Grassi 35' (o.g.); Cristante 80'; Lukaku 82'; Mancini 86'	Report	Cancellieri (yellow card) 39'; Maleh (yellow card) 58'	Stadium: Stadio Olimpico; Attendance: 61,443; Referee: Juan Luca Sacchi

24 September 2023 5	Torino	1–1	Roma	Turin
20:45 CEST (UTC+2)	Zapata 85'	Report	Paredes (yellow card) 60'; Lukaku 68'; Kristensen (yellow card) 84'	Stadium: Stadio Olimpico Grande Torino; Attendance: 23,299; Referee: Marco Guida

28 September 2023 6	Genoa	4–1	Roma	Genoa
20:45 CEST (UTC+2)	Guðmundsson 5'; Strootman (yellow card) 12'; Sabelli (yellow card) 27'; Retegui 45', (yellow card) 65'; Thorsby 74'; Messias 81'	Report	Cristante 22'; Mancini (yellow card) 42'; Paredes (yellow card) 75'; Aouar (yellow card) 89'	Stadium: Stadio Luigi Ferraris; Attendance: 32,961; Referee: Daniele Orsato

1 October 2023 7	Roma	2–0	Frosinone	Rome
18:00 CEST (UTC+2)	Lukaku 21'; Karsdorp (yellow card) 64'; Pellegrini 83'	Report	Barrenechea (yellow card) 64'; Soulé (yellow card) 82'	Stadium: Stadio Olimpico; Attendance: 62,638; Referee: Matteo Marchetti

8 October 2023 8	Cagliari	1–4	Roma	Cagliari
18:00 CEST (UTC+2)	Sulemana (yellow card) 17'; Obert (yellow card) 61'; Nández 87' (pen.)	Report	Paredes (yellow card) 11'; Aouar 19', (yellow card) 32'; Lukaku 20', 59'; Bove (yellow card) 45+2'; Belotti 51'	Stadium: Unipol Domus; Attendance: 16,307; Referee: Simone Sozza

22 October 2023 9	Roma	1–0	Monza	Rome
12:30 CEST (UTC+2)	Cristante (yellow card) 70'; Mancini (yellow card) 78'; El Shaarawy 90'	Report	D'Ambrosio (yellow card) 23' (yellow-red card) 41'; Machín (yellow card) 45+2'; Gagliardini (yellow card) 90+7'	Stadium: Stadio Olimpico; Attendance: 62,022; Referee: Giovanni Ayroldi

29 October 2023 10	Internazionale	1–0	Roma	Milan
18:00 CET (UTC+1)	Pavard (yellow card) 33'; Çalhanoğlu (yellow card) 56'; Bastoni (yellow card) 64'; Thuram 81'	Report	Mancini (yellow card) 13'; Ndicka (yellow card) 47'; Paredes (yellow card) 50'; Cristante (yellow card) 68'	Stadium: San Siro; Attendance: 75,573; Referee: Fabio Maresca

5 November 2023 11	Roma	2–1	Lecce	Rome
18:00 CET (UTC+1)	Lukaku (penalty missed) 5', 90+4', (yellow card) 90+6'; Sanches (yellow card) 76'; Llorente (yellow card) 89'; Azmoun 90+1'	Report	Banda (yellow card) 17'; Dorgu (yellow card) 27'; Almqvist 71'; Ramadani (yellow card) 77'; Touba (yellow card) 81'; Strefezza (yellow card) 87'	Stadium: Stadio Olimpico; Attendance: 64,790; Referee: Andrea Colombo

12 November 2023 12	Lazio	0–0	Roma	Rome
18:00 CET (UTC+1)	Immobile (yellow card) 39'; Luis Alberto (yellow card) 67'; Patric (yellow card) 74'	Report	Mancini (yellow card) 18'; Ndicka (yellow card) 31'; Lukaku (yellow card) 37'; Azmoun (yellow card) 87'	Stadium: Stadio Olimpico; Attendance: 63,000; Referee: Davide Massa

26 November 2023 13	Roma	3–1	Udinese	Rome
18:00 CET (UTC+1)	Mancini 20'; Pellegrini (yellow card) 33'; Dybala 81'; El Shaarawy 90'	Report	Ferreira (yellow card) 19'; Samardžić (yellow card) 26'; Success (yellow card) 28'; Thauvin 57'	Stadium: Stadio Olimpico; Attendance: 61,616; Referee: Luca Massimi

3 December 2023 14	Sassuolo	1–2	Roma	Reggio Emilia
18:00 CET (UTC+1)	Matheus Henrique 32', (yellow card) 83'; Thorstvedt (yellow card) 56'; Boloca (red card) 63'; Berardi (yellow card) 69'; Erlić (yellow card) 90+3'	Report	Dybala 76' (pen.); Kristensen (yellow card) 78', (goal) 82'	Stadium: Mapei Stadium – Città del Tricolore; Attendance: 19,113; Referee: Matteo Marcenaro

10 December 2023 15	Roma	1–1	Fiorentina	Rome
20:45 CET (UTC+1)	Lukaku 5', (red card) 87'; Cristante (yellow card) 37'; Zalewski (yellow card) 41' (yellow-red card) 64'; Paredes (yellow card) 80'; Llorente (yellow card) 90+6'	Report	Ikoné (yellow card) 64'; Martínez Quarta 66'; Biraghi (yellow card) 75'; Duncan (yellow card) 86'	Stadium: Stadio Olimpico; Attendance: 60,932; Referee: Antonio Rapuano

17 December 2023 16	Bologna	2–0	Roma	Bologna
18:00 CET (UTC+1)	Saelemaekers (yellow card) 9'; Beukema (yellow card) 33'; Moro 37'; Ferguson (yellow card) 45+1'; Kristensen 49' (o.g.); Freuler (yellow card) 66'	Report	Llorente (yellow card) 10'; Pellegrini (yellow card) 36'; Paredes (yellow card) 66'; Bove (yellow card) 72'	Stadium: Stadio Renato Dall'Ara; Attendance: 25,579; Referee: Marco Guida

23 December 2023 17	Roma	2–0	Napoli	Rome
20:45 CET (UTC+1)	Paredes (yellow card) 29'; Kristensen (yellow card) 32'; Cristante (yellow card) 38'; Belotti (yellow card) 60'; Zalewski (yellow card) 66'; Pellegrini 76'; El Shaarawy (yellow card) 82'; Azmoun (yellow card) 90+5'; Lukaku 90+6'	Report	Mário Rui (yellow card) 28'; Juan Jesus (yellow card) 62'; Politano (red card) 66'; Osimhen (yellow card) 73' (yellow-red card) 86'	Stadium: Stadio Olimpico; Attendance: 62,141; Referee: Andrea Colombo

30 December 2023 18	Juventus	1–0	Roma	Turin
20:45 CET (UTC+1)	Rabiot 47'; Locatelli (yellow card) 77'	Report	Paredes (yellow card) 68'	Stadium: Juventus Stadium; Attendance: 41,503; Referee: Simone Sozza

7 January 2024 19	Roma	1–1	Atalanta	Rome
20:45 CET (UTC+1)	Dybala 39' (pen.); Kristensen (yellow card) 63'	Report	Koopmeiners 8', (yellow card) 55'; Scalvini (yellow card) 29'; Ruggeri (yellow card) 38'; Éderson (yellow card) 43'; Zappacosta (yellow card) 74'; Holm (yellow card) 90'	Stadium: Stadio Olimpico; Attendance: 60,022; Referee: Gianluca Aureliano

14 January 2024 20	Milan	3–1	Roma	Milan
20:45 CET (UTC+1)	Adli 11'; Giroud 56'; Kjær (yellow card) 71'; Hernandez 84'; Gabbia (yellow card) 90+1'	Report	Mancini (yellow card) 43'; Cristante (yellow card) 56'; Paredes 69' (pen.); Huijsen (yellow card) 81'	Stadium: San Siro; Attendance: 74,198; Referee: Marco Guida

20 January 2024 21	Roma	2–1	Hellas Verona	Rome
20:45 CET (UTC+1)	Lukaku 19'; Pellegrini 25'; Paredes (yellow card) 41'; Llorente (yellow card) 10'	Report	Dawidowicz (yellow card) 52'; Folorunsho (yellow card) 57', (goal) 76'; Đurić (penalty missed) 66'	Stadium: Stadio Olimpico; Attendance: 61,857; Referee: Juan Luca Sacchi

29 January 2024 22	Salernitana	1–2	Roma	Salerno
20:45 CET (UTC+1)	Pierozzi (yellow card) 44'; Kastanos 70'; Candreva (yellow card) 88'	Report	Pellegrini (yellow card) 45+4', (goal) 66'; Dybala 51' (pen.), (yellow card) 84'; Patrício (yellow card) 89'	Stadium: Stadio Arechi; Attendance: 18,038; Referee: Marco Di Bello

5 February 2024 23	Roma	4–0	Cagliari	Rome
20:45 CET (UTC+1)	Pellegrini 2'; Dybala 23', 51' (pen.); Huijsen 59'; Paredes (yellow card) 66'	Report	Nández (yellow card) 66'	Stadium: Stadio Olimpico; Attendance: 61,755; Referee: Matteo Marcenaro

10 February 2024 24	Roma	2–4	Internazionale	Rome
18:00 CET (UTC+1)	Mancini 28', (yellow card) 47'; El Shaarawy 44'; Huijsen (yellow card) 90+2'	Report	Acerbi 17'; Thuram 49'; Angeliño 56' (o.g.); Bastoni 90+3'	Stadium: Stadio Olimpico; Attendance: 65,044; Referee: Marco Guida

18 February 2024 25	Frosinone	0–3	Roma	Frosinone
18:00 CET (UTC+1)		Report	Huijsen 38', (yellow card) 39'; Mancini (yellow card) 66'; Azmoun 71', (yellow card) 76'; Paredes 81' (pen.)	Stadium: Stadio Benito Stirpe; Attendance: 16,056; Referee: Antonio Giua

26 February 2024 26	Roma	3–2	Torino	Rome
18:00 CET (UTC+1)	Dybala 42' (pen.), 57', 69'; Ndicka (yellow card) 45+1'; Cristante (yellow card) 85'	Report	Lazaro (yellow card) 25'; Ricci (yellow card) 33'; Zapata 44'; Huijsen 89' (o.g.)	Stadium: Stadio Olimpico; Attendance: 61,595; Referee: Juan Luca Sacchi

2 March 2024 27	Monza	1–4	Roma	Monza
18:00 CET (UTC+1)	Bondo (yellow card) 62'; Carboni 87'	Report	Kristensen (yellow card) 25'; Pellegrini 38'; Lukaku 42'; Angeliño (yellow card) 48'; Svilar (yellow card) 58'; Dybala 63'; Paredes 82' (pen.); Cristante (yellow card) 84'	Stadium: Stadio Brianteo; Attendance: 14,188; Referee: Marco Piccinini

10 March 2024 28	Fiorentina	2–2	Roma	Florence
20:45 CET (UTC+1)	Ranieri 18'; Bonaventura (yellow card) 57'; Milenković (yellow card) 65'; Mandragora 69'; Biraghi (penalty missed) 80'	Report	Mancini (yellow card) 6'; Paredes (yellow card) 37'; Huijsen (yellow card) 45+1'; Aouar 58'; Ndicka (yellow card) 68'; Baldanzi (yellow card) 76'; Llorente 90+5'	Stadium: Stadio Artemio Franchi; Attendance: 30,438; Referee: Davide Massa

17 March 2024 29	Roma	1–0	Sassuolo	Rome
18:00 CET (UTC+1)	Pellegrini 50', (yellow card) 59'; Azmoun (yellow card) 89'	Report	Erlić (yellow card) 90'	Stadium: Stadio Olimpico; Attendance: 66,871; Referee: Gianluca Manganiello

1 April 2024 30	Lecce	0–0	Roma	Lecce
18:00 CEST (UTC+2)	Piccoli (yellow card) 38'; Baschirotto (yellow card) 45'; Ramadani (yellow card) 81'	Report	Ndicka (yellow card) 12'; Cristante (yellow card) 85'	Stadium: Stadio Via del mare Attendance: 29,031; Referee: Matteo Marcenaro

6 April 2024 31	Roma	1–0	Lazio	Rome
18:00 CEST (UTC+2)	Mancini 42', (yellow card) 55'; Çelik (yellow card) 68'; Paredes (yellow card) 81'; Pellegrini (yellow card) 90+3'; Lukaku (yellow card) 90+6'	Report	Vecino (yellow card) 21'; Pedro (yellow card) 73'; Castellanos (yellow card) 75'	Stadium: Stadio Olimpico; Attendance: 64,513; Referee: Marco Guida

22 April 2024 33	Roma	1–3	Bologna	Rome
18:30 CEST (UTC+2)	Paredes (yellow card) 6'; Angeliño (yellow card) 13'; Pellegrini (yellow card) 33'; El Shaarawy (yellow card) 40'; Azmoun 56'; Llorente (yellow card) 63'	Report	Zirkzee (yellow card) 6', (goal) 45'; El Azzouzi 14'; Freuler (yellow card) 64'; Saelemaekers 65'	Stadium: Stadio Olimpico; Attendance: 63,850; Referee: Fabio Maresca

25 April 2024 32	Udinese	1–2	Roma	Udine
20:00 CEST (UTC+2)	Pereyra 23'; Kamara (yellow card) 31'; Bijol (yellow card) 58'; Payero (yellow card) 66'	Report	Lukaku 64'; Baldanzi (yellow card) 69'; Karsdorp (yellow card) 90+3'; Cristante 90+5'	Stadium: Stadio Friuli; Attendance: 24,947; Referee: Luca Pairetto
Note: The match was originally played on 14 April 2024 at 18:00, but was suspended in the 71st minute with the score at 1–1, after Roma player Evan Ndicka collapsed on the pitch. The remainder of the match was postponed to be completed on 25 April 2024.

28 April 2024 34	Napoli	2–2	Roma	Naples
18:00 CEST (UTC+2)	Olivera 65'; Rrahmani (yellow card) 75'; Zambo Anguissa (yellow card) 80'; Osimhen 84' (pen.)	Report	Dybala 59' (pen.); Abraham 89'	Stadium: Stadio Diego Armando Maradona; Attendance: 45,000; Referee: Simone Sozza

5 May 2024 35	Roma	1–1	Juventus	Rome
20:45 CEST (UTC+2)	Lukaku 15'; Abraham (yellow card) 84'	Report	Weah (yellow card) 4'; Bremer 31'; Rabiot (yellow card) 71'	Stadium: Stadio Olimpico; Attendance: 63,996; Referee: Andrea Colombo

12 May 2024 36	Atalanta	2–1	Roma	Bergamo
20:45 CEST (UTC+2)	De Ketelaere 18', 20'; Koopmeiners (yellow card) 58'	Report	Ndicka (yellow card) 46'; Pellegrini 66' (pen.)	Stadium: Gewiss Stadium; Attendance: 14,895; Referee: Marco Guida

19 May 2024 37	Roma	1–0	Genoa	Rome
20:45 CEST (UTC+2)	Paredes (yellow card) 72' (yellow-red card) 72'; Lukaku 79', (yellow card) 82'	Report		Stadium: Stadio Olimpico; Attendance: 67,334; Referee: Gianluca Manganiello

26 May 2024 38	Empoli	2–1	Roma	Empoli
20:45 CEST (UTC+2)	Gyasi (yellow card) 2'; Cancellieri 13'; Destro (yellow card) 34'; Marin (yellow card) 81'; Niang (yellow card) 90', (goal) 90+3'	Report	Aouar 45+1'; Costa (yellow card) 90'	Stadium: Stadio Carlo Castellani; Attendance: 15,896; Referee: Davide Massa

=== Coppa Italia ===
3 January 2024 Round of 16	Roma	2–1	Cremonese	Rome
21:00 CET (UTC+1)	Llorente (yellow card) 34'; Çelik (yellow card) 41'; Karsdorp (yellow card) 72'; Lukaku 77'; Dybala 85' (pen.)	Report	Castagnetti (yellow card) 2'; Ghiglione (yellow card) 8'; Antov (yellow card) 9'; Ravanelli (yellow card) 16'; Tsadjout 37'; Bianchetti (yellow card) 78'	Stadium: Stadio Olimpico; Attendance: 61,975; Referee: Luca Pairetto

10 January 2024 Quarter-finals	Lazio	1–0	Roma	Rome
18:00 CET (UTC+1)	Zaccagni 51' (pen.); Castellanos (yellow card) 60'; Guendouzi (yellow card) 66'; Pellegrini (yellow card) 90+4'; Pedro (yellow card) 90+5' (yellow-red card) 90+6'	Report	Cristante (yellow card) 59'; Mancini (yellow card) 66', (red card) 90+11'; Azmoun (red card) 90+10'	Stadium: Stadio Olimpico; Attendance: 51,880; Referee: Daniele Orsato

=== UEFA Europa League ===
==== Group stage ====
The draw for the group stage was held on 1 September 2023.

Pos	Team	Pld	W	D	L	GF	GA	GD	Pts	Qualification	SLP	ROM	SRV	SHE
1	(Czech Republic) Slavia Prague	6	5	0	1	17	4	+13	15	Advance to round of 16	—	2–0	4–0	6–0
2	(Italy) Roma	6	4	1	1	12	4	+8	13	Advance to knockout round play-offs	2–0	—	4–0	3–0
3	(Switzerland) Servette	6	1	2	3	4	13	−9	5	Transfer to Europa Conference League	0–2	1–1	—	2–1
4	(Moldova) Sheriff Tiraspol	6	0	1	5	5	17	−12	1		2–3	1–2	1–1	—

Source: UEFA
Rules for classification: Group stage tiebreakers

21 September 2023 1	Sheriff Tiraspol (Moldova)	1–2	(Italy) Roma	Tiraspol, Moldova
19:45 EEST (UTC+3)	Talal (yellow card) 45+3'; Tovar 57'; Kiki (yellow card) 77'; Apostolakis (yellow card) 90+2'; Fernandes (yellow card) 90+7', (red card) 90+7'	Report	Kiki 45+4' (o.g.); Cristante (yellow card) 56'; Lukaku 65'	Stadium: Arena Sheriff; Attendance: 10,711; Referee: Andris Treimanis (Latvia)

5 October 2023 2	Roma (Italy)	4–0	(Switzerland) Servette	Rome, Italy
21:00 CEST (UTC+2)	Lukaku 21'; Belotti 46', 59'; Pellegrini 52'	Report	Ondoua (yellow card) 70'; Douline (yellow card) 81'	Stadium: Stadio Olimpico; Attendance: 55,764; Referee: Igor Pajač (Croatia)

26 October 2023 3	Roma (Italy)	2–0	(Czech Republic) Slavia Prague	Rome, Italy
21:00 CEST (UTC+2)	Bove 1'; Bove (yellow card) 23'; Lukaku 17'; Ndicka (yellow card) 68'	Report	Masopust (yellow card) 27'	Stadium: Stadio Olimpico; Attendance: 64,934; Referee: Espen Eskås (Norway)

9 November 2023 4	Slavia Prague (Czech Republic)	2–0	(Italy) Roma	Prague, Czech Republic
18:45 CET (UTC+1)	Jurečka 50'; Masopust (yellow card) 58', (goal) 74'; Ševčík (yellow card) 83'; Van Buren (yellow card) 88'	Report	Paredes (yellow card) 44'; Ndicka (yellow card) 90+5'	Stadium: Fortuna Arena; Attendance: 19,265; Referee: François Letexier (France)

30 November 2023 5	Servette (Switzerland)	1–1	(Italy) Roma	Geneva, Switzerland
21:00 CET (UTC+1)	Cognat (yellow card) 44'; Bedia 50'; Antunes (yellow card) 75'; Rouiller (yellow card) 84'	Report	Lukaku 21'; Cristante (yellow card) 66'; Ndicka (yellow card) 90+2'; Belotti (yellow card) 90+6'	Stadium: Stade de Genève; Attendance: 28,534; Referee: Daniel Stefański (Poland)

14 December 2023 6	Roma (Italy)	3–0	(Moldova) Sheriff Tiraspol	Rome, Italy
18:45 CET (UTC+1)	Lukaku 11'; Belotti 32'; Bove (yellow card) 77'; Pisilli 90+3'	Report	Talal (yellow card) 24'; Ricardinho (yellow card) 61'	Stadium: Stadio Olimpico; Attendance: 47,803; Referee: Jérôme Brisard (France)

==== Knockout phase ====
===== Knockout round play-offs =====
The draw for the knockout round play-offs was held on 18 December 2023.

15 February 2024 First leg	Feyenoord (Netherlands)	1–1	(Italy) Roma	Rotterdam, Netherlands
18:45 CET (UTC+1)	Beelen (yellow card) 14'; Minteh (yellow card) 35'; Paixão 45+1'; Stengs (yellow card) 69'	Report	Llorente (yellow card) 46'; Lukaku 67'; Bove (yellow card) 86'	Stadium: De Kuip; Attendance: 43,235; Referee: Radu Petrescu (Romania)

22 February 2024 Second leg	Roma (Italy)	1–1 (a.e.t.) (2–2 agg.) (4–2 p)	(Netherlands) Feyenoord	Rome, Italy
21:00 CET (UTC+1)	Pellegrini 15'; Spinazzola (yellow card) 17'; Paredes (yellow card) 26'; Ndicka (yellow card) 103'	Report	Giménez 5'; Geertruida (yellow card) 27'; Hancko (yellow card) 66'; Timber (yellow card) 90'; Wieffer (yellow card) 107'	Stadium: Stadio Olimpico; Attendance: 67,293; Referee: Jesús Gil Manzano (Spain)
	Penalties
	Paredes (penalty scored); Lukaku (penalty missed); Cristante (penalty scored); Aouar (penalty scored); Zalewski (penalty scored)		(penalty scored) Ueda; (penalty missed) Hancko; (penalty missed) Jahanbakhsh; (penalty scored) Hartman

===== Round of 16 =====
The draw for the round of 16 was held on 23 February 2024.

7 March 2024 First leg	Roma (Italy)	4–0	(England) Brighton & Hove Albion	Rome, Italy
18:45 CET (UTC+1)	Dybala 13'; Lukaku 43'; Spinazzola (yellow card) 61'; Mancini 64'; Cristante 68'	Report	Van Hecke (yellow card) 39'; Lamptey (yellow card) 67'	Stadium: Stadio Olimpico; Attendance: 64,877; Referee: François Letexier (France)

14 March 2024 Second leg	Brighton & Hove Albion (England)	1–0 (1–4 agg.)	(Italy) Roma	Falmer, England
20:00 GMT (UTC±0)	Lamptey (yellow card) 31'; Welbeck 37'; Estupiñán (yellow card) 40'	Report	Mancini (yellow card) 12'; Ndicka (yellow card) 35'; Pellegrini (yellow card) 40'; Svilar (yellow card) 45+1'; Çelik (yellow card) 86'	Stadium: Falmer Stadium; Attendance: 30,380; Referee: Felix Zwayer (Germany)

===== Quarter-finals =====
The draw for the quarter-finals was held on 15 March 2024.

11 April 2024 First leg	Milan (Italy)	0–1	(Italy) Roma	Milan, Italy
21:00 CEST (UTC+2)	Pulisic (yellow card) 33'; Adli (yellow card) 63'; Loftus-Cheek (yellow card) 73'	Report	Mancini 17'; Cristante (yellow card) 38'	Stadium: San Siro; Attendance: 75,023; Referee: Clément Turpin (France)

18 April 2024 Second leg	Roma (Italy)	2–1 (3–1 agg.)	(Italy) Milan	Rome, Italy
21:00 CEST (UTC+2)	Mancini 12'; Dybala 22'; Çelik (red card) 31'	Report	Gabbia (yellow card) 46', (goal) 85'; Adli (yellow card) 51'; Jović (yellow card) 77'; Calabria (yellow card) 86'; Tomori (yellow card) 89'; Hernandez (yellow card) 90+3'	Stadium: Stadio Olimpico; Attendance: 66,025; Referee: Szymon Marciniak (Poland)

===== Semi-finals =====
The draw for the semi-finals was held on 15 March 2024, after the draw for the quarter-finals.

2 May 2024 First leg	Roma (Italy)	0–2	(Germany) Bayer Leverkusen	Rome, Italy
21:00 CEST (UTC+2)	Pellegrini (yellow card) 30'; Spinazzola (yellow card) 75'; Cristante (yellow card) 78'	Report	Tah (yellow card) 16'; Wirtz 28'; Andrich 73', (yellow card) 76'; Xhaka (yellow card) 75'	Stadium: Stadio Olimpico; Attendance: 64,073; Referee: François Letexier (France)

9 May 2024 Second leg	Bayer Leverkusen (Germany)	2–2 (4–2 agg.)	(Italy) Roma	Leverkusen, Germany
21:00 CEST (UTC+2)	Tapsoba (yellow card) 20'; Tah (yellow card) 42'; Mancini 82' (o.g.); Wirtz (yellow card) 89'; Stanišić 90+7'	Report	Mancini (yellow card) 20'; Pellegrini (yellow card) 21'; Paredes (yellow card) 27', (goal) 43' (pen.), 66' (pen.); Zalewski (yellow card) 29'	Stadium: BayArena; Attendance: 30,210; Referee: Danny Makkelie (Netherlands)

== Statistics ==
=== Appearances and goals ===
No.	Pos	Nat	Player	Total		Serie A		Coppa Italia		Europa League	
No.	Pos	Nat	Player	Apps	Goals	Apps	Goals	Apps	Goals	Apps	Goals
Goalkeepers
1	GK	(Portugal) POR	Rui Patrício	25	0	24	0	1	0	0	0
63	GK	(Italy) ITA	Pietro Boer	0	0	0	0	0	0	0	0
99	GK	(Serbia) SRB	Mile Svilar	29	0	14	0	1	0	14	0
Defenders
2	DF	(Netherlands) NED	Rick Karsdorp	27	0	13+4	0	2	0	5+3	0
3	DF	(Spain) ESP	Dean Huijsen	12	2	3+8	2	1	0	0	0
5	DF	(Ivory Coast) CIV	Evan Ndicka	34	0	25	0	0	0	8+1	0
6	DF	(England) ENG	Chris Smalling	11	0	4+3	0	0	0	3+1	0
14	DF	(Spain) ESP	Diego Llorente	39	1	26+1	1	1	0	7+4	0
19	DF	(Turkey) TUR	Zeki Çelik	28	0	6+10	0	1	0	9+2	0
23	DF	(Italy) ITA	Gianluca Mancini	47	7	32+2	4	1	0	12	3
37	DF	(Italy) ITA	Leonardo Spinazzola	36	1	15+9	1	0+2	0	8+2	0
43	DF	(Denmark) DEN	Rasmus Kristensen	29	1	18+9	1	1+1	0	0	0
69	DF	(Spain) ESP	Angeliño	18	0	12+2	0	0	0	1+3	0
Midfielders
4	MF	(Italy) ITA	Bryan Cristante	50	4	35	3	2	0	11+2	1
7	MF	(Italy) ITA	Lorenzo Pellegrini	39	10	19+8	8	1+1	0	8+2	2
16	MF	(Argentina) ARG	Leandro Paredes	47	5	30+2	3	2	0	10+3	2
20	MF	(Portugal) POR	Renato Sanches	12	1	1+6	1	0	0	2+3	0
22	MF	(Algeria) ALG	Houssem Aouar	24	4	9+6	4	0	0	6+3	0
35	MF	(Italy) ITA	Tommaso Baldanzi	16	0	5+6	0	0	0	1+4	0
52	MF	(Italy) ITA	Edoardo Bove	44	1	18+12	0	2	0	8+4	1
59	MF	(Poland) POL	Nicola Zalewski	32	0	10+11	0	1+1	0	5+4	0
60	MF	(Italy) ITA	Riccardo Pagano	7	0	0+4	0	0	0	0+3	0
61	MF	(Italy) ITA	Niccolò Pisilli	2	1	0+1	0	0	0	0+1	1
66	MF	(Italy) ITA	Mattia Mannini	1	1	0	0	0	0	0+1	1
68	MF	(Italy) ITA	Francesco D'Alessio	2	0	0	0	0	0	0+2	0
Forwards
9	FW	(England) ENG	Tammy Abraham	12	1	2+6	1	0	0	0+4	0
17	FW	(Iran) IRI	Sardar Azmoun	28	3	2+20	3	0+2	0	2+2	0
21	FW	(Argentina) ARG	Paulo Dybala	38	16	24+3	13	1+1	1	7+2	2
64	FW	(Italy) ITA	Luigi Cherubini	1	0	0	0	0	0	0+1	0
67	FW	(Portugal) POR	João Costa	5	0	0+3	0	0	0	0+2	0
90	FW	(Belgium) BEL	Romelu Lukaku	45	21	28+2	13	2	1	13	7
92	FW	(Italy) ITA	Stephan El Shaarawy	46	3	17+14	3	1+1	0	11+2	0
Players transferred out during the season
11	FW	(Italy) ITA	Andrea Belotti	22	6	6+8	3	1+1	0	3+3	3
24	DF	(Albania) ALB	Marash Kumbulla	0	0	0	0	0	0	0	0

Source: Competitions
