= Edoardo Bove =

Italian footballer (born 2002)

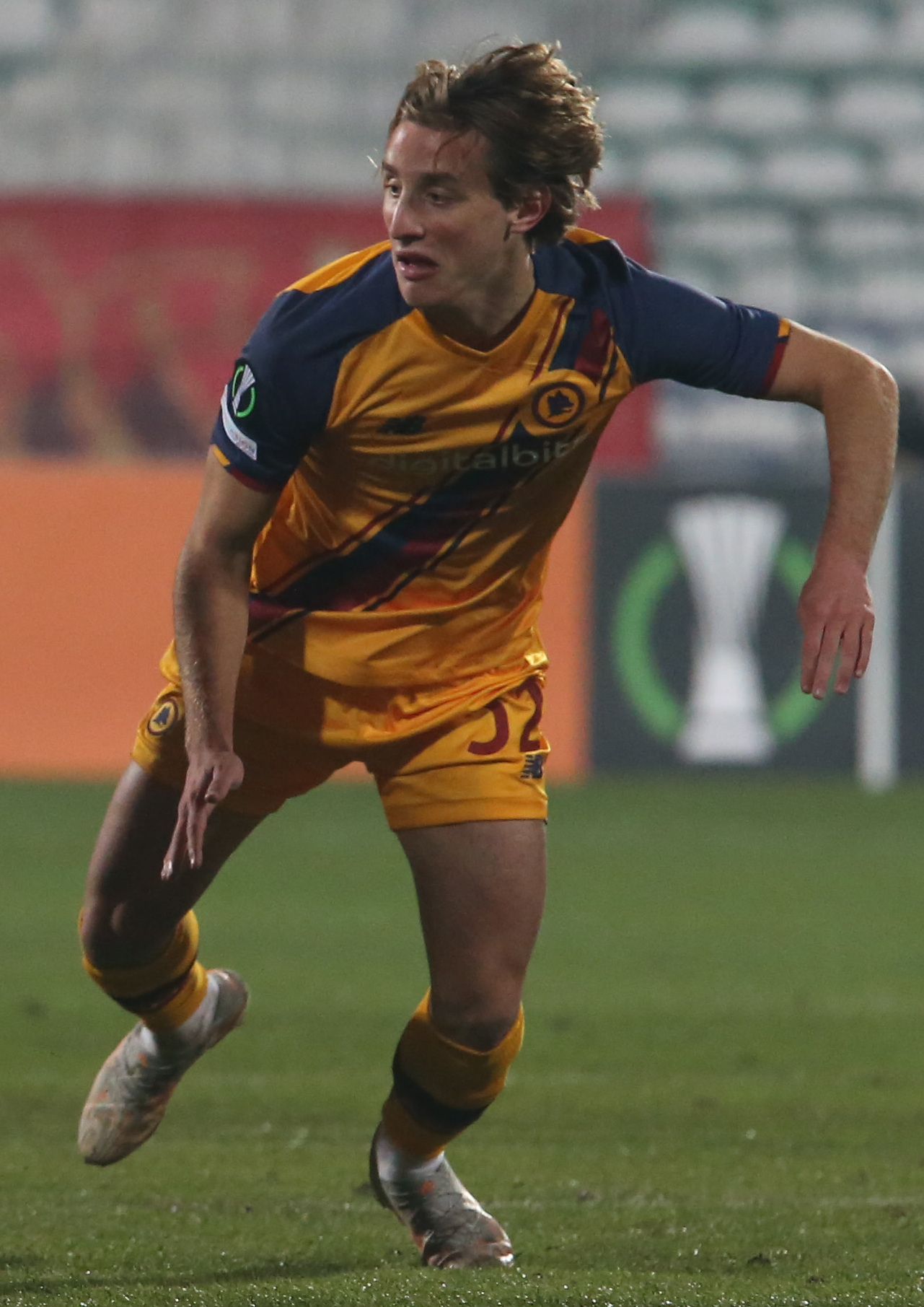
- Bove playing for Roma in 2021

Personal information
- Date of birth: 16 May 2002 (age 24)
- Place of birth: Rome, Italy
- Height: 1.81 m (5 ft 11 in)
- Position: Midfielder

Team information
- Current team: Watford
- Number: 8

Youth career
- 2012–2021: Roma

Senior career*
Years	Team	Apps	(Gls)
2021–2026	Roma	65	(2)
2024–2025	→ Fiorentina (loan)	12	(1)
2026–	Watford	16	(1)

International career^{‡}
2018	Italy U16	7	(0)
2019–2020	Italy U18	5	(1)
2021	Italy U20	6	(2)
2022–2024	Italy U21	14	(1)
- * Club domestic league appearances and goals as of 23:08, 9 September 2026 (UTC) ‡ National team caps and goals as of 10 September 2024

Edoardo Bove (born 16 May 2002) is an Italian professional footballer who plays as a midfielder for English EFL Championship club Watford.

== Early life ==
Edoardo Bove was born in Rome. Bove's paternal family is originally from Naples, while his mother is German-Italian. Bove grew up in the quartiere of Appio-Latino, and studied at the Massimo Institute in Rome's neighborhood EUR. Subsequently, he continued his studies at Luiss 'Guido Carli', in Rome, enrolling in a degree course in Economics and Management. In an interview, Bove stated that he was inspired by Roma's former captain Daniele De Rossi.

== Club career ==
=== Roma ===
Bove started playing football in the Roman club of Boreale Donorione until 2012, when he joined Roma after following a successful trial under the supervision of Bruno Conti. On 20 November 2020, Bove extended his contract with Roma until 2024.

Bove was first called up by the first team on 3 December for a Europa League match against Young Boys without making his debut. Bove made his professional debut for Roma on the 9 May 2021, replacing Ebrima Darboe in the second half of a 5–0 Serie A win against Crotone at the Stadio Olimpico. In the 2021–22 season, Bove was often called up by Roma's coach José Mourinho. He made his first Conference League match on 9 December as a starter in a 3–2 win against CSKA Sofia.

On 29 December, Roma announced that his contract would be extended until 2025. On 19 February 2022, Bove scored his first senior goal allowing Roma to draw 2–2 against Verona.

On 15 December 2023, Bove extended his contract with Roma until 2028.

==== Loan to Fiorentina ====
On 30 August 2024, he joined fellow Serie A club Fiorentina on a season-long loan, with an option to make the move permanent. On 27 October, Bove scored his first goal for Fiorentina against his parent club Roma in a 5–1 home victory.

On 1 December 2024, Bove collapsed during Fiorentina’s match against Inter Milan. The following morning, journalist Matteo Dovellini for the newspaper la Repubblica reported that Bove had been "extubated", was "lucid", and had no cerebral or cardiac damage.

As a result of this event, he underwent surgery for the implantation of a subcutaneous implantable defibrillator. According to Italian regulations, with this device he is not allowed to engage in competitive sports.

On 9 January 2026, Edoardo Bove terminated his contract with Roma.

=== Watford ===
On 21 January 2026, Bove signed a five-and-a-half-year contract with Watford in England's second-tier EFL Championship.

On 17 March 2026, he scored his first goal for the club in a 3–1 home victory over Wrexham.

== Style of play ==
Bove is a mezzala or trequartista who is good at offensive insertions and tactically disciplined. He also has a good technique and an eye for the goal.

During his second season at Roma, José Mourinho labeled Bove a "sick dog", due to his intensity and aggressiveness on the pitch, a nickname that quickly became popular among fans.

== Personal life and other ventures ==
Off the pitch, Bove enrolled in an economics and management course at Luiss University in Rome, studying part-time, after achieving the highest possible score on his school-leaving tests.

In 2025, he was a guest on the fifth night of the Sanremo Music Festival.

== Career statistics ==
As of match played 5 September 2026

Appearances and goals by club, season and competition
Club	Season	League			National cup (Note: Includes Coppa Italia)		League cup (Note: Includes EFL Cup)		Europe		Total	
Club	Season	Division	Apps	Goals	Apps	Goal	Apps	Goals	Apps	Goals	Apps	Goals
Roma	2020–21	Serie A	1	0	0	0	—		0	0	1	0
Roma	2021–22	Serie A	11	1	0	0	—		2 (Note: Appearances in UEFA Europa Conference League)	0	13	1
Roma	2022–23	Serie A	22	1	1	0	—		10 (Note: Appearances in UEFA Europa League)	1	33	2
Roma	2023–24	Serie A	31	0	2	0	—		12	1	45	1
Roma	Total		65	2	3	0	—		24	2	92	4
Fiorentina (loan)	2024–25	Serie A	12	1	0	0	—		3	0	15	1
Watford	2025–26	Championship	11	1	—		—		—		11	1
Watford	2026–27	Championship	5	0	0	0	2	0	—		7	0
Watford	Total		16	1	0	0	2	0	—		18	1
Career total			93	4	3	0	2	0	27	2	125	6

== Honours ==
Roma

- UEFA Europa Conference League: 2021–22
- UEFA Europa League runner-up: 2022–23
