= Mile Svilar =

Serbia international footballer (born 1999)

Mile Svilar Миле Свилар
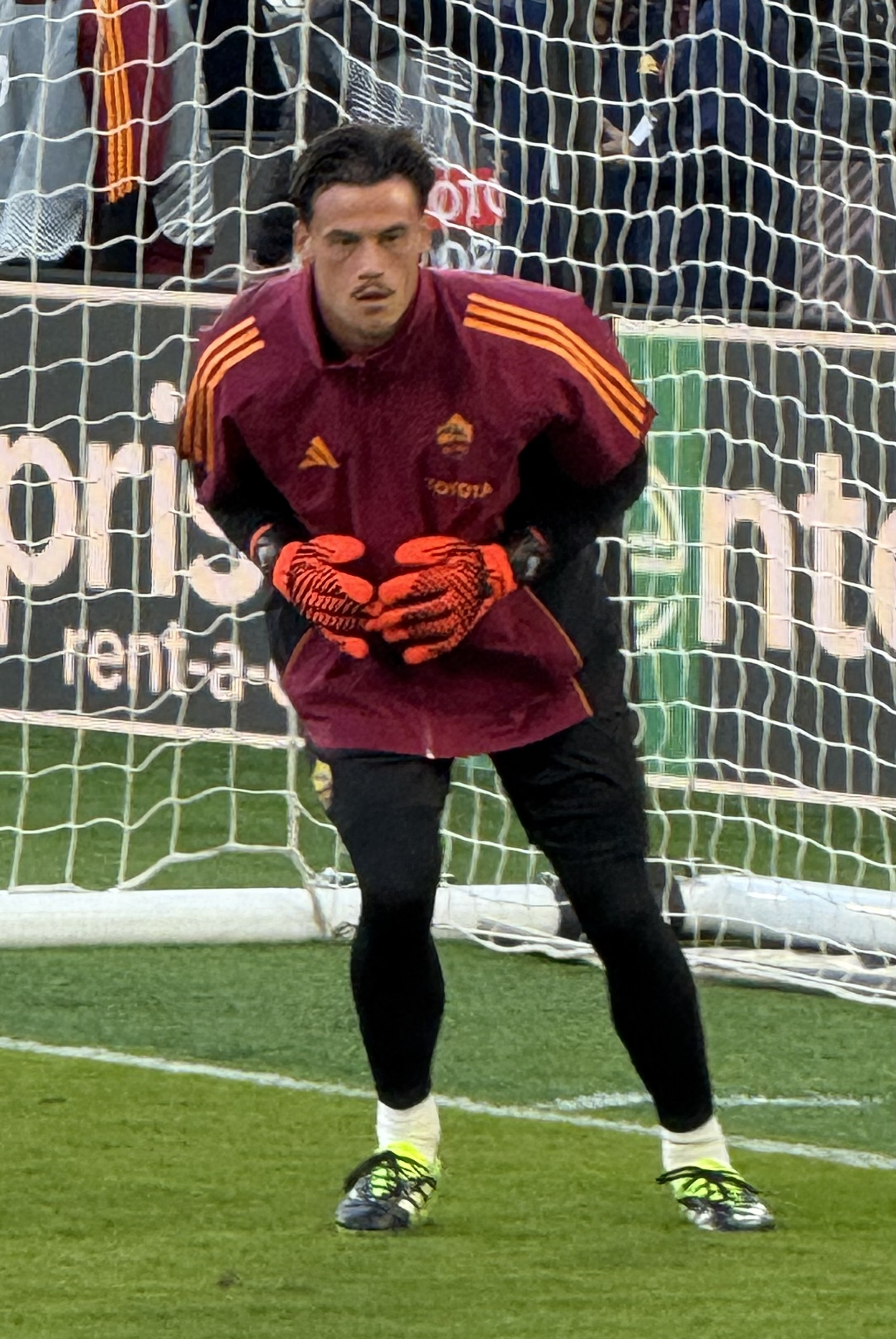
- Svilar warming up for Roma in 2025

Personal information
- Full name: Mile Svilar
- Date of birth: 27 August 1999 (age 27)
- Place of birth: Antwerp, Belgium
- Height: 1.89 m (6 ft 2 in)
- Position: Goalkeeper

Team information
- Current team: Roma
- Number: 99

Youth career
- 2008–2009: KFCO Wilrijk
- 2009–2010: Beerschot AC
- 2010–2017: Anderlecht

Senior career*
Years	Team	Apps	(Gls)
2016–2017	Anderlecht	0	(0)
2017–2022	Benfica	7	(0)
2018–2022	Benfica B	56	(0)
2022–	Roma	100	(0)

International career^{‡}
2014	Belgium U15	3	(0)
2014–2015	Belgium U16	3	(0)
2016	Belgium U17	7	(0)
2016	Belgium U18	1	(0)
2016–2017	Belgium U19	5	(0)
2019–2020	Belgium U21	5	(0)
2021	Serbia	1	(0)
- * Club domestic league appearances and goals as of 23:18, 21 November 2026 (UTC) ‡ National team caps and goals as of 1 September 2021

Mile Svilar (Serbian Cyrillic: Миле Свилар; born 27 August 1999) is a professional footballer who plays as a goalkeeper for Serie A club Roma. Born in Belgium, he played for the Serbia national team.

== Club career ==
=== Early career and Anderlecht ===
Svilar is a product of the Belgian youth teams of KFCO Wilrijk and Beerschot AC. In 2010 he joined Anderlecht, signing his first professional contract with the club on 27 August 2015. He was promoted to the first team in the 2016–17 season as the third choice goalkeeper, he was first included in the match day squad in the Belgian Cup match against Charleroi. He was also amongst the unused substitutes in Anderlecht's victory in the 2017 Belgian Super Cup.

=== Benfica ===
Svilar signed a five-year contract with Portuguese champions Benfica on 28 August 2017. On 14 October, he made his debut with the club in a 1–0 victory over Olhanense, becoming the youngest goalkeeper to ever play for Benfica. In international competition, he broke Iker Casillas' record as the youngest goalkeeper to ever play in the Champions League on 18 October 2017, in a 1–0 home defeat to Manchester United, aged 18 years and 52 days. In the return leg against the English side, aged 18 years and 65 days, he became the youngest goalkeeper ever to save a penalty in a Champions League match. In the same match, which ended in a 2–0 away defeat, he also became the youngest player ever to score an own goal in the competition.

=== Roma ===
On 1 July 2022, Svilar signed a contract with Serie A club Roma until 30 June 2027. On 22 February 2024, he saved two penalties during the shootouts which ended in a 4–2 victory over Feyenoord in the 2023–24 Europa League knockout round play-offs. In the 2024–25 season, Svilar recorded the highest save percentage in the league at 77%, and kept 16 clean sheets, a tally matched only by Alex Meret. On 11 July 2025, he extended his contract with the club until 2030.

== International career ==
=== Youth ===
Svilar was a member of Belgium U-16, Belgium U-17, Belgium U-18 national teams and was also a member of Belgium U-19. He was the first choice goalkeeper for the Belgium U-17 team at the 2016 UEFA European Under-17 Championship in Azerbaijan.

=== Senior ===
Born in Belgium to a Serbian father and Bosnian Serb mother, Svilar is eligible to represent Belgium, Bosnia and Herzegovina or Serbia. On 4 November 2017, he announced that he would play his first game for the Serbia national team in March 2018, as he accepted the call from the Football Association of Serbia. On 20 August 2021, he received his first call up to the Serbia national football team, he debuted with Serbia in a friendly 4–0 win over Qatar on 1 September 2021.

On 5 March 2024, Svilar was called up by Serbia after being absent for almost three years, but he reportedly turned down the call-up, and was therefore not included in the final squad. Serbia manager Dragan Stojković later commented that Svilar would not receive future international call-ups from Serbia.

== Personal life ==
Svilar has a Serbian passport. His father, Ratko, is a former Yugoslav goalkeeper. His mother is from Trnovo, near Sarajevo, Bosnia and Herzegovina.

== Career statistics ==
=== Club ===
As of match played 21 November 2026

Appearances and goals by club, season and competition
Club	Season	League			National cup (Note: Includes Taça de Portugal, Coppa Italia)		League cup (Note: Includes Taça da Liga)		Europe		Total	
Club	Season	Division	Apps	Goals	Apps	Goals	Apps	Goals	Apps	Goals	Apps	Goals
Anderlecht	2016–17	Belgian First Division A	0	0	0	0	—		0	0	0	0
Benfica	2017–18	Primeira Liga	3	0	1	0	2	0	3 (Note: Appearances in UEFA Champions League)	0	9	0
Benfica	2018–19	Primeira Liga	1	0	6	0	4	0	0	0	11	0
Benfica	2019–20	Primeira Liga	1	0	0	0	0	0	0	0	1	0
Benfica	2020–21	Primeira Liga	2	0	0	0	0	0	0	0	2	0
Benfica	Total		7	0	7	0	6	0	3	0	23	0
Benfica B	2018–19	LigaPro	2	0	—		—		—		2	0
Benfica B	2019–20	LigaPro	20	0	—		—		—		20	0
Benfica B	2020–21	Liga Portugal 2	21	0	—		—		—		21	0
Benfica B	2021–22	Liga Portugal 2	13	0	—		—		—		13	0
Benfica B	Total		56	0	—		—		—		56	0
Roma	2022–23	Serie A	3	0	0	0	—		1 (Note: Appearance(s) in UEFA Europa League)	0	4	0
Roma	2023–24	Serie A	15	0	1	0	—		14	0	30	0
Roma	2024–25	Serie A	38	0	1	0	—		12	0	51	0
Roma	2025–26	Serie A	38	0	1	0	—		9	0	48	0
Roma	2026–27	Serie A	6	0	0	0	—		1	0	7	0
Roma	Total		100	0	3	0	—		37	0	140	0
Career total			163	0	10	0	6	0	40	0	219	0

=== International ===
As of 1 September 2021

Appearances and goals by national team and year
National team	Year	Apps	Goals
Serbia	2021	1	0
Total		1	0

== Honours ==
Anderlecht

- Belgian Super Cup: 2017

Benfica

- Primeira Liga: 2018–19

Individual

- UEFA Europa League Team of the Season: 2023–24
- Serie A Best Goalkeeper: 2024–25, 2025–26
- The Athletic Serie A Team of the Season: 2024–25
- Serie A Team of the Year: 2024–25, 2025–26

== See also ==
- European Cup and UEFA Champions League records and statistics
- List of association football families
