= Marash Kumbulla =

Albanian footballer (born 2000)

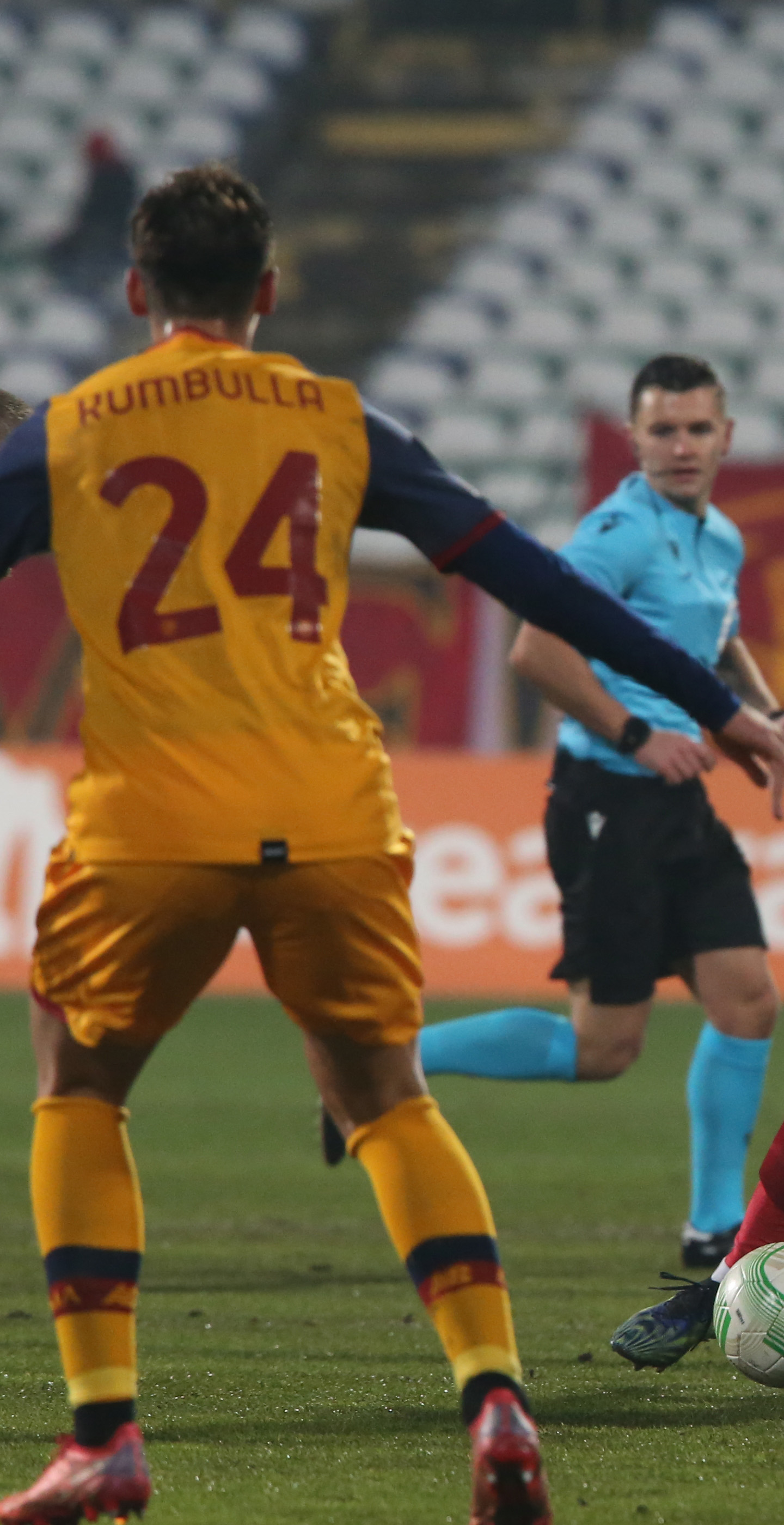
- Kumbulla with Roma in 2021

Personal information
- Full name: Marash Kumbulla
- Date of birth: 8 February 2000 (age 26)
- Place of birth: Peschiera del Garda, Italy
- Height: 1.91 m (6 ft 3 in)
- Position: Centre-back

Team information
- Current team: Rayo Vallecano (on loan from Roma)
- Number: 3

Youth career
- 2008–2018: Hellas Verona

Senior career*
Years	Team	Apps	(Gls)
2018–2021	Hellas Verona	26	(1)
2020–2021	→ Roma (loan)	21	(1)
2021–	Roma	24	(0)
2024	→ Sassuolo (loan)	7	(0)
2024–2025	→ Espanyol (loan)	35	(3)
2025–2026	→ Mallorca (loan)	8	(0)
2026–	→ Rayo Vallecano (loan)	0	(0)

International career^{‡}
2015–2016	Albania U17	6	(0)
2017–2018	Albania U19	5	(0)
2019	Albania U21	1	(0)
2019–	Albania	27	(0)
- * Club domestic league appearances and goals as of 7 August 2026 ‡ National team caps and goals as of 29 September 2026

Marash Kumbulla (born 8 February 2000) is a professional footballer who plays as a centre-back for La Liga club Rayo Vallecano, on loan from Serie A club Roma. Born in Italy, he plays for the Albania national team.

== Club career ==
Kumbulla made his professional debut for Hellas Verona on 12 August 2018, starting in a 2–0 away loss to Catania in the Coppa Italia.

On 17 September 2020, Kumbulla joined Roma on loan with an obligation to buy. On 1 February 2024, he moved on loan to Sassuolo.

On 17 August 2024, Kumbulla was announced at La Liga side Espanyol on a one-year loan deal. Roughly one year later, he returned to Spain, and moved to fellow La Liga club Mallorca also in a one-year loan deal.

On 7 August 2026, Kumbulla remained in the Spanish top tier after agreeing to a one-year loan deal with Rayo Vallecano.

== International career ==
Kumbulla made his senior debut for the Albania national team on 14 October 2019, in a 4–0 away win against Moldova in a Euro 2020 qualifier. He came on for Ardian Ismajli in the 89th minute.

== Personal life ==
Kumbulla was born in Peschiera del Garda, Italy to Albanian parents from Shkodër.

== Career statistics ==
=== Club ===
As of match played 27 October 2026

Appearances and goals by club, season and competition
Club	Season	League			National cup (Note: Includes Coppa Italia, Copa del Rey)		Europe		Total	
Club	Season	Division	Apps	Goals	Apps	Goals	Apps	Goals	Apps	Goals
Hellas Verona	2018–19	Serie B	1	0	1	0	—		2	0
Hellas Verona	2019–20	Serie A	25	1	1	0	—		26	1
Hellas Verona	Total		26	1	2	0	—		28	1
Roma (loan)	2020–21	Serie A	21	1	1	0	6 (Note: Appearances in UEFA Europa Conference League)	1	28	2
Roma (loan)	2021–22	Serie A	17	0	2	1	9 (Note: Appearances in UEFA Europa League)	0	28	1
Roma	2022–23	Serie A	7	0	2	0	3	1	12	1
Roma	2023–24	Serie A	0	0	0	0	0	0	0	0
Roma	Total		45	1	5	1	18	2	68	4
Sassuolo (loan)	2023–24	Serie A	7	0	—		—		7	0
Espanyol (loan)	2024–25	La Liga	35	3	1	0	—		36	3
Mallorca (loan)	2025–26	La Liga	8	0	1	0	—		9	0
Rayo Vallecano (loan)	2026–27	La Liga	0	0	1	0	—		1	0
Career total			121	5	10	1	18	2	149	8

=== International ===
As of match played 29 September 2026

Appearances and goals by national team and year
National team	Year	Apps	Goals
Albania	2019	1	0
Albania	2020	2	0
Albania	2021	9	0
Albania	2022	5	0
Albania	2023	1	0
Albania	2024	4	0
Albania	2025	4	0
Albania	2026	1	0
Total		27	0

== Honours ==
Roma

- UEFA Europa Conference League: 2021–22
- UEFA Europa League runner-up: 2022–23
