= 2022–23 AS Roma season =

Roma
2022–23 season
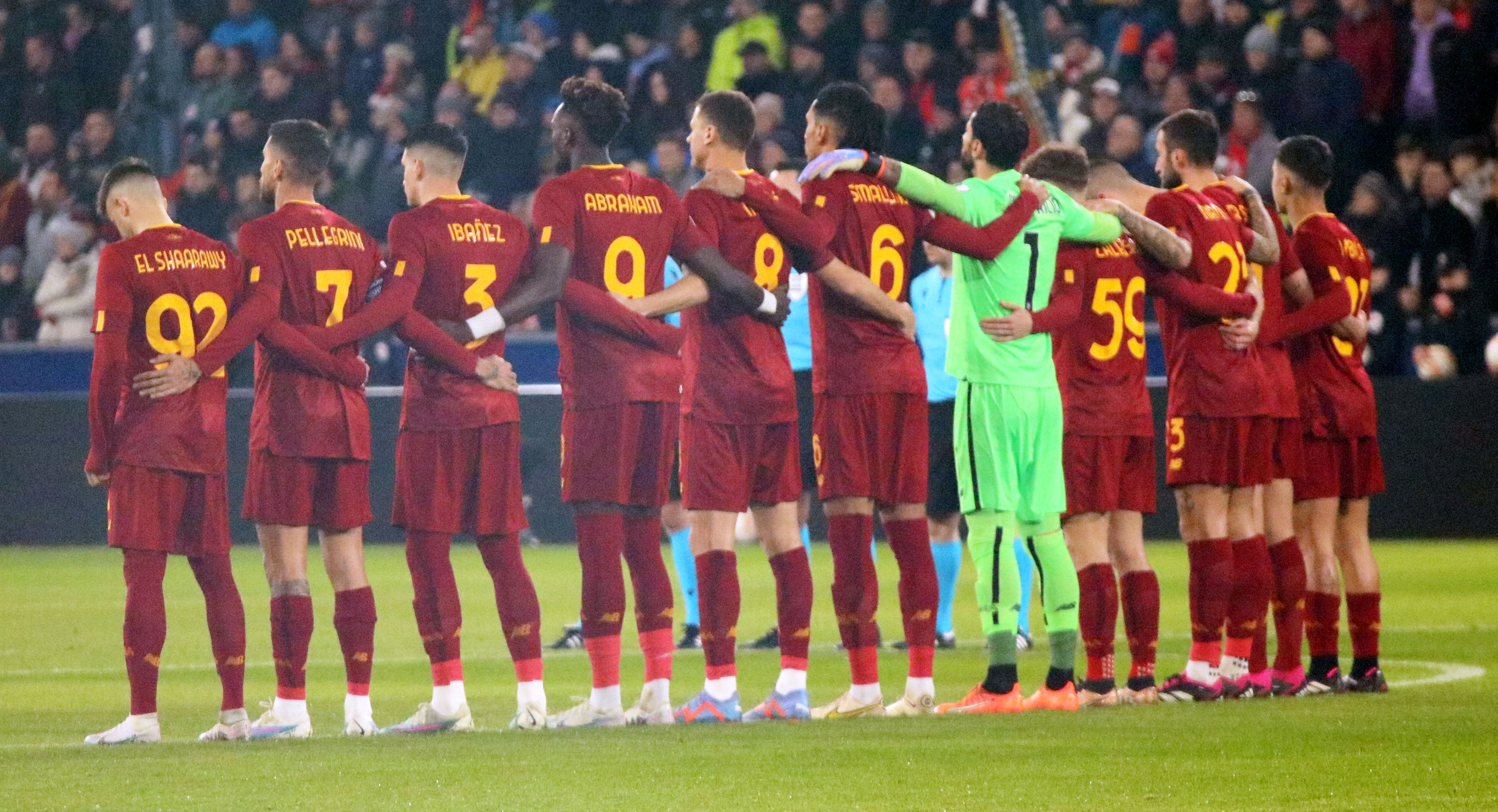
- Roma players lining up before a UEFA Europa League match against Red Bull Salzburg in February 2023
- President: Dan Friedkin
- Head coach: José Mourinho
- Stadium: Stadio Olimpico
- Serie A: 6th
- Coppa Italia: Quarter-finals
- UEFA Europa League: Runners-up
- Top goalscorer: League: Paulo Dybala (12); All: Paulo Dybala (18)
- Highest home attendance: 64,213 vs Juventus, 5 March 2023, Serie A
- Lowest home attendance: 60,000 vs Genoa, 12 January 2023, Coppa Italia
- Average home league attendance: 61,736
Home colours	Away colours	Third colours

The 2022–23 season was the 96th season in the history of AS Roma and their 71st consecutive season in the top flight. The club participated in Serie A, the Coppa Italia and the UEFA Europa League, finishing as runners-up of the latter competition.

== Players ==
=== Squad information ===
As of 30 June 2023.

No.	Name	Nat	Position(s)	Date of birth (age)	Signed from	Signed in	Contract ends	Apps.	Goals
Goalkeepers
1	Rui Patrício	(Portugal)	GK	15 February 1988 (aged 35)	(England) Wolverhampton Wanderers	2021	2024	105	0
63	Pietro Boer	(Italy)	GK	12 May 2002 (aged 21)	(Italy) Roma Primavera	2021	2024	1	0
99	Mile Svilar	(Serbia)	GK	27 August 1999 (aged 23)	(Portugal) Benfica	2022	2027	4	0
Defenders
2	Rick Karsdorp	(Netherlands)	RB / RM	11 February 1995 (aged 28)	(Netherlands) Feyenoord	2017	2025	129	1
3	Roger Ibañez	(Brazil)	CB / LB	23 November 1998 (aged 24)	(Italy) Atalanta	2020	2025	149	9
6	Chris Smalling	(England)	CB	22 November 1989 (aged 33)	(England) Manchester United	2019	2024	143	10
14	Diego Llorente	(Spain)	CB	9 November 1997 (aged 25)	(England) Leeds United	2023	2024	12	0
19	Zeki Çelik	(Turkey)	RB	17 February 1997 (aged 26)	(France) Lille	2022	2026	34	0
23	Gianluca Mancini (vc)	(Italy)	CB	17 April 1996 (aged 27)	(Italy) Atalanta	2019	2024	179	8
24	Marash Kumbulla	(Albania)	CB	8 February 2000 (aged 23)	(Italy) Hellas Verona	2020	2025	68	4
37	Leonardo Spinazzola	(Italy)	LB / LWB	25 March 1993 (aged 30)	(Italy) Juventus	2019	2024	115	6
Midfielders
4	Bryan Cristante	(Italy)	DM / CM	3 March 1995 (aged 28)	(Italy) Atalanta	2018	2025	228	11
7	Lorenzo Pellegrini (c)	(Italy)	AM / CM	19 June 1996 (aged 27)	(Italy) Sassuolo	2017	2026	240	42
8	Nemanja Matić	(Serbia)	DM	1 August 1988 (aged 34)	(England) Manchester United	2022	2023	50	2
20	Mady Camara	(Guinea)	DM	28 February 1997 (aged 26)	(Greece) Olympiacos	2022	2023	21	0
25	Georginio Wijnaldum	(Netherlands)	CM / AM	11 November 1990 (aged 32)	(France) Paris Saint-Germain	2022	2023	23	2
52	Edoardo Bove	(Italy)	DM / CM	16 May 2002 (aged 21)	(Italy) Roma Primavera	2021	2025	47	3
62	Cristian Volpato	(Italy)	CM	15 November 2003 (aged 19)	(Italy) Roma Primavera	2021	2025	14	1
68	Benjamin Tahirović	(Bosnia and Herzegovina)	DM	3 March 2003 (aged 20)	(Italy) Roma Primavera	2021	2026	13	0
Forwards
9	Tammy Abraham	(England)	CF	2 October 1997 (aged 25)	(England) Chelsea	2021	2026	107	36
11	Andrea Belotti	(Italy)	CF	20 December 1993 (aged 29)	(Italy) Torino	2022	2025	46	4
18	Ola Solbakken	(Norway)	CF	7 September 1998 (aged 24)	(Norway) Bodø/Glimt	2023	2027	14	1
21	Paulo Dybala	(Argentina)	CF	15 November 1993 (aged 29)	(Italy) Juventus	2022	2025	38	18
59	Nicola Zalewski	(Poland)	LW	23 January 2002 (aged 21)	(Italy) Roma Primavera	2021	2025	73	2
92	Stephan El Shaarawy	(Italy)	LW	27 October 1992 (aged 30)	(China) Shanghai Shenhua	2021	2025	231	58

=== Other players under contract ===
Note: Flags indicate national team as defined under FIFA eligibility rules; some limited exceptions apply. Players may hold more than one non-FIFA nationality.

No.	Pos.	Nation	Player
—	DF	FRA	William Bianda
—	MF	CRO	Ante Ćorić

=== Out on loan ===
Note: Flags indicate national team as defined under FIFA eligibility rules; some limited exceptions apply. Players may hold more than one non-FIFA nationality.

No.	Pos.	Nation	Player
—	GK	ITA	Davide Mastrantonio (at Triestina until 30 June 2023)
—	DF	USA	Bryan Reynolds (at Westerlo until 30 June 2023)
—	DF	URU	Matías Viña (at Bournemouth until 30 June 2023)
—	MF	ESP	Gonzalo Villar (at Getafe until 30 June 2023)

No.	Pos.	Nation	Player
—	FW	ESP	Carles Pérez (at Celta Vigo until 30 June 2023)
—	FW	UZB	Eldor Shomurodov (at Spezia until 30 June 2023)
—	FW	NED	Justin Kluivert (at Valencia until 30 June 2023)
—	FW	FRA	Ruben Providence (at TSV Hartberg until 30 June 2023)

== Transfers ==
=== In ===
No.	Pos.	Player	Transferred from	Fee	Date	Source
8	MF	(Serbia) Nemanja Matić	(England) Manchester United	Free transfer	1 July 2022	
99	GK	(Serbia) Mile Svilar	(Portugal) Benfica	Free transfer	1 July 2022	
19	DF	(Turkey) Zeki Çelik	(France) Lille	€7M	5 July 2022	
21	FW	(Argentina) Paulo Dybala	(Italy) Juventus	Free transfer	20 July 2022	
11	FW	(Italy) Andrea Belotti	(Italy) Torino	Free transfer	28 August 2022	
18	FW	(Norway) Ola Solbakken	(Norway) Bodø/Glimt	Free transfer	2 January 2023	

==== Loans in ====
No.	Pos.	Player	Transferred from	Fee	Date	Source
25	MF	(Netherlands) Georginio Wijnaldum	(France) Paris Saint-Germain	Loan with option to buy	5 August 2022	
20	MF	(Guinea) Mady Camara	(Greece) Olympiacos	Loan with option to buy	31 August 2022	
14	DF	(Spain) Diego Llorente	(England) Leeds United	Loan with option to buy	31 January 2023	

=== Out ===
No.	Pos.	Player	Transferred to	Fee	Date	Source
1	GK	(Sweden) Robin Olsen	(England) Aston Villa	€3.5M	4 June 2022	
87	GK	(Brazil) Daniel Fuzato	(Spain) Ibiza	Undisclosed	21 June 2022	
77	MF	(Armenia) Henrikh Mkhitaryan	(Italy) Internazionale	Free transfer	30 June 2022	
13	GK	(Spain) Pau López	(France) Marseille	€12M	1 July 2022	
15	DF	(England) Ainsley Maitland-Niles	(England) Arsenal	End of loan	1 July 2022	
27	MF	(Portugal) Sérgio Oliveira	(Portugal) Porto	End of loan	1 July 2022	
25	DF	(Italy) Alessandro Florenzi	(Italy) Milan	€2.5M	1 July 2022	
	FW	(Turkey) Cengiz Ünder	(France) Marseille	€8.4M	1 July 2022	
	DF	(Italy) Davide Santon	Retired	End of contract	1 July 2022	
62	MF	(Italy) Tommaso Milanese	(Italy) Cremonese	Undisclosed	2 July 2022	
17	MF	(France) Jordan Veretout	(France) Marseille	€11M plus €5M variables	5 August 2022	
64	FW	(Ghana) Felix Afena-Gyan	(Italy) Cremonese	€6M plus €3M variables	29 August 2022	
	MF	(Guinea) Amadou Diawara	(Belgium) Anderlecht	€3M	31 August 2022	
33	DF	(Italy) Riccardo Calafiori	(Switzerland) Basel	€1.5M	31 August 2022	
30	MF	(Italy) Alessio Riccardi	(Italy) Latina	Free transfer	31 August 2022	
	MF	(Italy) Devid Bouah	(Italy) Reggina	Free transfer	1 September 2022	
22	MF	(Italy) Nicolò Zaniolo	(Turkey) Galatasaray	€16.5M plus €13M variables	8 February 2023	

==== Loans out ====
No.	Pos.	Player	Transferred to	Fee	Date	Source
19	DF	(United States) Bryan Reynolds	(Belgium) Westerlo	Loan with option to buy	21 June 2022	
8	MF	(Spain) Gonzalo Villar	(Italy) Sampdoria	Loan with option to buy	8 August 2022	
11	FW	(Spain) Carles Pérez	(Spain) Celta Vigo	Loan with option to buy	9 August 2022	
	FW	(Netherlands) Justin Kluivert	(Spain) Valencia	Loan with option to buy	1 September 2022	
8	MF	(Spain) Gonzalo Villar	(Spain) Getafe	Loan with obligation to buy	13 January 2023	
14	FW	(Uzbekistan) Eldor Shomurodov	(Italy) Spezia	Loan	30 January 2023	
17	DF	(Uruguay) Matías Viña	(England) Bournemouth	Loan with option to buy	30 January 2023	

== Pre-season and friendlies ==
Win Draw Loss Fixtures

13 July 2022 Friendly	Roma (Italy)	2–0	(England) Sunderland	Albufeira, Portugal
12:00 CEST (UTC+2)	Afena-Gyan 75'; Zaniolo 80'	Report	O'Nien (yellow card) 35'; Winchester (yellow card) 62'; Matete (yellow card) 64'	Stadium: Estádio Municipal de Albufeira; Referee: Bruno José Costa (Portugal)

16 July 2022 Friendly	Roma (Italy)	2–0	(Portugal) Portimonense	Albufeira, Portugal
20:00 CEST (UTC+2)	Tripi 27'; Mancini (yellow card) 45+1'; Zaniolo 71'; Abraham (penalty missed) 87'	Report		Stadium: Estádio Municipal de Albufeira; Attendance: 1,000; Referee: André Narciso (Portugal)

19 July 2022 Friendly	Sporting CP (Portugal)	3–2	(Italy) Roma	Faro/Loulé, Portugal
21:00 CEST (UTC+2)	Gonçalves 29' (pen.); Inácio 53'; Ugarte (yellow card) 62'; Nunes (yellow card) 85'; Tabata 86'	Report	Inácio 31' (o.g.); Smalling (yellow card) 52'; Mancini (yellow card) 58'; Pellegrini 69'; Zaniolo (yellow card) 79'; Veretout (yellow card) 85'	Stadium: Estádio Algarve; Referee: Hugo Silva (Portugal)

23 July 2022 Friendly	Roma (Italy)	1–1	(France) Nice	Albufeira, Portugal
20:00 CEST (UTC+2)	Spinazzola (yellow card) 20'; Viña (yellow card) 24'; Lemina 54' (o.g.); Zalewski (yellow card) 79'; Cristante (yellow card) 90+4'	Report	Brahimi 41'	Stadium: Estadio Nacional de Albufeira; Attendance: 11,114

27 July 2022 Friendly	Roma (Italy)	0–1	(Italy) Ascoli	Trigoria, Italy
17:30 CEST (UTC+2)			Botteghin 67'	Stadium: Centro sportivo Fulvio Bernardini; Referee: Federico Dionisi

30 July 2022 I-Tech Cup	Tottenham Hotspur (England)	0–1	(Italy) Roma	Haifa, Israel
21:15 IST (UTC+3)	Romero (yellow card) 83'	Report	Ibañez 29'; Pellegrini (yellow card) 83'	Stadium: Sammy Ofer Stadium; Referee: Yigal Frid (Israel)

7 August 2022 Global Tour for Peace	Roma (Italy)	5–0	(Ukraine) Shakhtar Donetsk	Rome, Italy
20:45 CEST (UTC+2)	Pellegrini 19'; Mancini 41'; Konoplya 45+1' (o.g.); Zaniolo 59'; Bove 87'	Report	Mykhaylichenko (yellow card) 42'	Stadium: Stadio Olimpico; Attendance: 65,303; Referee: Daniele Doveri (Italy)

25 November 2022 EuroJapan Cup	Nagoya Grampus (Japan)	0–0	(Italy) Roma	Nagoya, Japan
19:30 JST (UTC+9)		Report	El Shaarawy (yellow card) 34'	Stadium: Toyota Stadium; Attendance: 13,383; Referee: Yoshiro Imamura (Japan)

28 November 2022 EuroJapan Cup	Yokohama F. Marinos (Japan)	3–3	(Italy) Roma	Tokyo, Japan
19:30 JST (UTC+9)	Eduardo 9'; Svilar 45+1' (o.g.); Matsubara 72'	Report	El Shaarawy (yellow card) 28'; Zaniolo 69'; Ibañez 84'; Shomurodov 90+3'	Stadium: Japan National Stadium; Attendance: 40,000; Referee: Hiroki Kasahara (Japan)

16 December 2022 Friendly	Roma (Italy)	0–3	(Spain) Cádiz	Albufeira, Portugal
20:00 CET (UTC+1)	Viña (red card) 38'; Cristante (yellow card) 87'; Çelik (yellow card) 87'	Report	Alcaraz 23'; Alejo (yellow card) 28'; Fali (yellow card) 45+5'; Bongonda 68'; Sobrino (yellow card) 86'; Ledesma (yellow card) 87'; Negredo 90+3'	Stadium: Estádio Municipal de Albufeira; Referee: Vítor Ferreira (Portugal)

19 December 2022 Friendly	Casa Pia (Portugal)	0–1	(Italy) Roma	Albufeira, Portugal
20:00 CET (UTC+1)	Godwin (yellow card) 64'; Bolgado (yellow card) 90+1'	Report	El Shaarawy 34'	Stadium: Estádio Municipal de Albufeira; Referee: Ricardo Baixinho (Portugal)

22 December 2022 Friendly	Roma (Italy)	3–0	(Netherlands) RKC Waalwijk	Albufeira, Portugal
16:00 CET (UTC+1)	Abraham 3'; El Shaarawy 19'; Bove (yellow card) 39'; Zaniolo 48'; Cristante (yellow card) 83'	Report	Seuntjens (yellow card) 64', (penalty missed) 76'	Stadium: Estádio Municipal de Albufeira; Attendance: 500; Referee: Marcos Brazão (Portugal)

== Competitions ==
=== Overall record ===
Competition	First match	Last match	Starting round	Final position	Record							
Competition	First match	Last match	Starting round	Final position	Pld	W	D	L	GF	GA	GD	Win %
Serie A	14 August 2022	4 June 2023	Matchday 1	6th	38	18	9	11	50	38	+12	47.37
Coppa Italia	12 January 2023	1 February 2023	Round of 16	Quarter-finals	2	1	0	1	2	2	+0	50.00
UEFA Europa League	8 September 2022	31 May 2023	Group stage	Runners-up	15	7	4	4	21	11	+10	46.67
Total					55	26	13	16	73	51	+22	47.27

Source: Soccerway

=== Serie A ===
==== League table ====
Pos	Team	Pld	W	D	L	GF	GA	GD	Pts	Qualification or relegation
4	Milan	38	20	10	8	64	43	+21	70	Qualification for the Champions League group stage (Note: Should the first and second, or 17th and 18th-placed teams at the end of the season be tied on points, a play-off tiebreaker match was held at a neutral site to determine the title and final team relegated respectively.)
5	Atalanta	38	19	7	12	66	48	+18	64	Qualification for the Europa League group stage (Note: Since the winners of the 2022–23 Coppa Italia, Inter Milan, qualified for the Champions League, the Europa League berth awarded to the Coppa Italia winners was passed to the sixth-placed team, and the Europa Conference League berth awarded to the sixth-placed team was passed to the seventh-placed team.)
6	Roma	38	18	9	11	50	38	+12	63	Qualification for the Europa League group stage
7	Juventus (Note: Juventus were excluded from UEFA competitions due to violation of UEFA's financial regulations.)	38	22	6	10	56	33	+23	62 (Note: Juventus were deducted 10 points as punishment for capital gain violations.)	
8	Fiorentina	38	15	11	12	53	43	+10	56	Qualification for the Εuropa Conference League play-off round

Source: Serie A
Rules for classification: 1) Points; 2) Tiebreaker for Champions team and third relegated team; 3) Head-to-head points; 4) Head-to-head goal difference; 5) Goal difference; 6) Goals scored; 7) Draw. (Note: Head-to-head record is used only after all the matches between the teams in question have been played)

==== Results summary ====
Overall								Home						Away					
Pld	W	D	L	GF	GA	GD	Pts	W	D	L	GF	GA	GD	W	D	L	GF	GA	GD
38	18	9	11	50	38	+12	63	11	3	5	28	15	+13	7	6	6	22	23	−1

Source: Serie A

==== Results by round ====
Round	1	2	3	4	5	6	7	8	9	10	11	12	13	14	15	16	17	18	19	20	21	22	23	24	25	26	27	28	29	30	31	32	33	34	35	36	37	38
Ground	A	H	A	H	A	A	H	A	H	A	H	A	H	A	H	H	A	H	A	A	H	A	H	A	H	H	A	H	A	H	A	H	A	H	A	H	A	H
Result	W	W	D	W	L	W	L	W	W	W	L	W	L	D	D	W	D	W	W	L	W	D	W	L	W	L	L	W	W	W	L	D	D	L	D	D	L	W
Position	9	3	6	2	5	5	6	6	6	4	5	4	6	7	7	6	7	7	5	6	3	4	3	5	4	5	5	5	3	3	5	6	7	7	6	6	6	6

Source: Serie A
A = Away; H = Home; W = Win; D = Draw; L = Loss

==== Matches ====
The league fixtures were announced on 24 June 2022.

14 August 2022 1	Salernitana	0–1	Roma	Salerno
20:45 CEST (UTC+2)	Coulibaly (yellow card) 28'; Gyömbér (yellow card) 39'; Kastanos (yellow card) 40'	Report	Cristante 33'; Smalling (yellow card) 48'; Matić (yellow card) 72'	Stadium: Stadio Arechi; Attendance: 24,983; Referee: Simone Sozza

22 August 2022 2	Roma	1–0	Cremonese	Rome
18:30 CEST (UTC+2)	Smalling 65'	Report	Aiwu (yellow card) 24'; Zanimacchia (yellow card) 50'; Bianchetti (yellow card) 79'	Stadium: Stadio Olimpico; Attendance: 60,859; Referee: Luca Massimi

27 August 2022 3	Juventus	1–1	Roma	Turin
18:30 CEST (UTC+2)	Vlahović 2'; Locatelli (yellow card) 6'; Kostić (yellow card) 77'	Report	Cristante (yellow card) 41'; Abraham 69'; Çelik (yellow card) 90+5'	Stadium: Juventus Stadium; Attendance: 41,003; Referee: Massimiliano Irrati

30 August 2022 4	Roma	3–0	Monza	Rome
20:45 CEST (UTC+2)	Dybala 18', 32'; Ibañez 61'	Report	Machín (yellow card) 20'; Marlon (yellow card) 40'; Ciurria (yellow card) 77'	Stadium: Stadio Olimpico; Attendance: 60,659; Referee: Marco Piccinini

4 September 2022 5	Udinese	4–0	Roma	Udine
20:45 CEST (UTC+2)	Udogie 5', (yellow card) 62'; Samardžić 56'; Makengo (yellow card) 66'; Pereyra 75', (yellow card) 89'; Lovrić 82'	Report	Dybala (yellow card) 45'; Pellegrini (yellow card) 52'	Stadium: Stadio Friuli; Attendance: 24,108; Referee: Fabio Maresca

12 September 2022 6	Empoli	1–2	Roma	Empoli
20:45 CEST (UTC+2)	Parisi (yellow card) 27'; Bandinelli 43'; Ismajli (yellow card) 60'; Akpa Akpro (yellow card) 65', (red card) 87'	Report	Dybala 17'; Abraham 71'; Pellegrini (penalty missed) 80'; Çelik (yellow card) 89'	Stadium: Stadio Carlo Castellani; Attendance: 13,420; Referee: Livio Marinelli

18 September 2022 7	Roma	0–1	Atalanta	Rome
18:00 CEST (UTC+2)		Report	Mæhle (yellow card) 23'; Scalvini 35'; Tolói (yellow card) 47'; Hateboer (yellow card) 55'; Demiral (yellow card) 76'; De Roon (yellow card) 80'; Koopmeiners (yellow card) 87'; Malinovskyi (yellow card) 90+4'	Stadium: Stadio Olimpico; Attendance: 61,335; Referee: Daniele Chiffi

1 October 2022 8	Internazionale	1–2	Roma	Milan
18:00 CEST (UTC+2)	Dimarco 30'; Asllani (yellow card) 72'; Correa (yellow card) 87'; Gosens (yellow card) 90'; Barella (yellow card) 90+2'	Report	Dybala 39'; Zaniolo (yellow card) 54'; Mancini (yellow card) 62'; Smalling (yellow card) 65', (goal) 75'	Stadium: San Siro; Attendance: 75,389; Referee: Davide Massa

9 October 2022 9	Roma	2–1	Lecce	Rome
20:45 CEST (UTC+2)	Smalling 6'; Dybala 48' (pen.); Ibañez (yellow card) 60'; Mancini (yellow card) 62'	Report	Hjumland (red card) 23'; Strefezza 39'; Umtiti (yellow card) 57'	Stadium: Stadio Olimpico; Attendance: 64,018; Referee: Alessandro Prontera

17 October 2022 10	Sampdoria	0–1	Roma	Genoa
18:30 CEST (UTC+2)	Rincón (yellow card) 40'; Verre (yellow card) 65'; Pussetto (yellow card) 72'; Colley (yellow card) 90+1'	Report	Pellegrini 9' (pen.), (yellow card) 67'; Ibañez (yellow card) 32'; Zaniolo (yellow card) 90+3'	Stadium: Stadio Luigi Ferraris; Attendance: 20,803; Referee: Marco Di Bello

23 October 2022 11	Roma	0–1	Napoli	Rome
20:45 CEST (UTC+2)	Smalling (yellow card) 22'; Cristante (yellow card) 51'; Ibañez (yellow card) 74'	Report	Lozano (yellow card) 45+3'; Ndombele (yellow card) 47'; Olivera (yellow card) 78'; Lobotka (yellow card) 79'; Osimhen 80'	Stadium: Stadio Olimpico; Attendance: 61,633; Referee: Massimiliano Irrati

31 October 2022 12	Hellas Verona	1–3	Roma	Verona
18:30 CET (UTC+1)	Ceccherini (yellow card) 20'; Dawidowicz 26', (red card) 36'; Hongla (yellow card) 71'; Hien (yellow card) 81'	Report	Cristante (yellow card) 23'; Zaniolo 45+2'; Volpato 88'; El Shaarawy 90+2'	Stadium: Stadio Marcantonio Bentegodi; Attendance: 24,000; Referee: Juan Luca Sacchi

6 November 2022 13	Roma	0–1	Lazio	Rome
18:00 CET (UTC+1)	Mancini (yellow card) 8'; Patrício (yellow card) 87'	Report	Lazzari (yellow card) 25'; Felipe Anderson 29'; Vecino (yellow card) 50'; Radu (yellow card) 89'	Stadium: Stadio Olimpico; Attendance: 62,847; Referee: Daniele Orsato

9 November 2022 14	Sassuolo	1–1	Roma	Reggio Emilia
18:30 CET (UTC+1)	Laurienté (yellow card) 38'; Ayhan (yellow card) 54'; Lopez (yellow card) 62'; Kyriakopoulos (yellow card) 68'; Pinamonti 85', (yellow card) 86'	Report	Zaniolo (yellow card) 26'; Cristante (yellow card) 73'; Abraham 80'; Mancini (yellow card) 90+3'	Stadium: Mapei Stadium – Città del Tricolore; Attendance: 16,665; Referee: Giovannni Ayroldi

13 November 2022 15	Roma	1–1	Torino	Rome
15:00 CET (UTC+1)	Camara (yellow card) 53'; Dybala (yellow card) 86'; Tahirović (yellow card) 89'; Belotti (penalty missed) 90+2'; Matić 90+4'	Report	Buongiorno (yellow card) 48'; Linetty 55'; Lazaro (yellow card) 90+5'	Stadium: Stadio Olimpico; Attendance: 61,168; Referee: Antonio Rapuano

4 January 2023 16	Roma	1–0	Bologna	Rome
16:30 CET (UTC+1)	Pellegrini 6' (pen.); Ibañez (yellow card) 33'; Çelik (yellow card) 76'	Report	Ferguson (yellow card) 69'; Aebischer (yellow card) 85'; Domínguez (yellow card) 90+7'	Stadium: Stadio Olimpico; Attendance: 62,092; Referee: Alberto Santoro

8 January 2023 17	Milan	2–2	Roma	Milan
20:45 CET (UTC+1)	Leão (yellow card) 26'; Kalulu 30'; Bennacer (yellow card) 62'; Tomori (yellow card) 68'; Tonali (yellow card) 72'; Pobega 77'	Report	Çelik (yellow card) 9'; Zalewski (yellow card) 30'; Zaniolo (yellow card) 45+1'; Ibañez (yellow card) 82', (goal) 87'; Matić (yellow card) 90+1'; Abraham 90+3', (yellow card) 90+6'	Stadium: San Siro; Attendance: 74,103; Referee: Davide Massa

15 January 2023 18	Roma	2–0	Fiorentina	Rome
20:45 CET (UTC+1)	Smalling (yellow card) 15'; Dybala 40', 82'; Kumbulla (yellow card) 55'; Bove (yellow card) 63'	Report	Dodô (yellow card) 4' (yellow-red card) 24'; González (yellow card) 56'; Igor (yellow card) 79'	Stadium: Stadio Olimpico; Attendance: 61,327; Referee: Antonio Giua

22 January 2023 19	Spezia	0–2	Roma	La Spezia
18:00 CET (UTC+1)	Bourabia (yellow card) 36'; Caldara (yellow card) 40'; Reca (yellow card) 58'	Report	El Shaarawy 45'; Abraham 49'; Çelik (yellow card) 88'	Stadium: Stadio Alberto Picco; Attendance: 9,153; Referee: Simone Sozza

29 January 2023 20	Napoli	2–1	Roma	Naples
20:45 CET (UTC+1)	Osimhen 17', (yellow card) 68'; Simeone 86'	Report	Dybala (yellow card) 33'; El Shaarawy (yellow card) 70', (goal) 75'	Stadium: Stadio Diego Armando Maradona; Attendance: 50,000; Referee: Daniele Orsato

4 February 2023 21	Roma	2–0	Empoli	Rome
18:00 CET (UTC+1)	Ibañez 2'; Abraham 6'; Zalewski (yellow card) 10'; Bove (yellow card) 77'	Report	Henderson (yellow card) 81'	Stadium: Stadio Olimpico; Attendance: 60,908; Referee: Federico Dionisi

11 February 2023 22	Lecce	1–1	Roma	Lecce
18:00 CET (UTC+1)	Ibañez 7' (o.g.); Strefezza (yellow card) 16'; Colombo (yellow card) 52'; Gonzàlez (yellow card) 62'; Hjulmand (yellow card) 90+1'	Report	Dybala 17' (pen.); Ibañez (yellow card) 33'	Stadium: Stadio Via del mare Attendance: 25,200; Referee: Gianluca Aureliano

19 February 2023 23	Roma	1–0	Hellas Verona	Rome
20:45 CET (UTC+1)	Smalling (yellow card) 38'; Solbakken 45'	Report	Hien (yellow card) 28'; Ngonge (yellow card) 42'	Stadium: Stadio Olimpico; Attendance: 61,009; Referee: Simone Sozza

28 February 2023 24	Cremonese	2–1	Roma	Cremona
18:30 CET (UTC+1)	Ferrari (yellow card) 12'; Tsadjout 17'; Bianchetti (yellow card) 52'; Sernicola (yellow card) 58'; Ciofani 83' (pen.)	Report	Spinazzola 71'; El Shaarawy (yellow card) 74'; Ibañez (yellow card) 84'	Stadium: Stadio Giovanni Zini; Attendance: 11,367; Referee: Marco Piccinini

5 March 2023 25	Roma	1–0	Juventus	Rome
20:45 CET (UTC+1)	Matić (yellow card) 33'; Mancini 53'; Cristante (yellow card) 58'; Spinazzola (yellow card) 63'	Report	Locatelli (yellow card) 31'; Kostić (yellow card) 75'; Kean (red card) 90'	Stadium: Stadio Olimpico; Attendance: 64,213; Referee: Fabio Maresca

12 March 2023 26	Roma	3–4	Sassuolo	Rome
18:00 CET (UTC+1)	Smalling (yellow card) 9'; Zalewski 26'; Kumbulla (red card) 45+3'; Dybala 50'; Matić (yellow card) 54'; Ibañez (yellow card) 73'; Camara (yellow card) 86'; Wijnaldum 90+4'	Report	Laurienté 13', 18'; Berardi 45+4' (pen.); Lopez (yellow card) 50'; Ruan (yellow card) 59'; Pinamonti 75'	Stadium: Stadio Olimpico; Attendance: 60,816; Referee: Michael Fabbri

19 March 2023 27	Lazio	1–0	Roma	Rome
18:00 CET (UTC+1)	Luis Alberto (yellow card) 25'; Romagnoli (yellow card) 59'; Zaccagni 65'; Cancellieri (yellow card) 89'; Bašić (yellow card) 90+2'; Marušić (red card) 90+7'	Report	Ibañez (yellow card) 8' (yellow-red card) 32'; Cristante (yellow card) 72', (red card) 90+7'; Mancini (yellow card) 80'	Stadium: Stadio Olimpico; Attendance: 60,000; Referee: Davide Massa
Note: Marušić and Cristante received red cards following the final whistle.

2 April 2023 28	Roma	3–0	Sampdoria	Rome
18:00 CEST (UTC+2)	Abraham (yellow card) 8'; Spinazzola (yellow card) 21'; Wijnaldum 57'; Smalling (yellow card) 60'; Dybala 88' (pen.); El Shaarawy 90+3'	Report	Murillo (yellow card) 11' (yellow-red card) 52'; Zanoli (yellow card) 49'; Paoletti (yellow card) 69'; Winks (yellow card) 70'	Stadium: Stadio Olimpico; Attendance: 62,108; Referee: Massimiliano Irrati

8 April 2023 29	Torino	0–1	Roma	Turin
18:30 CEST (UTC+2)	Schuurs (yellow card) 7'; Gineitis (yellow card) 78'; Milinković-Savić (yellow card) 81'	Report	Dybala 8' (pen.); El Shaarawy (yellow card) 11'	Stadium: Stadio Olimpico Grande Torino; Attendance: 22,142; Referee: Andrea Colombo

16 April 2023 30	Roma	3–0	Udinese	Rome
20:45 CEST (UTC+2)	Cristante (penalty missed) 37'; Bove 37'; Pellegrini 55'; Mancini (yellow card) 67'; Abraham 90+1'	Report	Pereyra (yellow card) 35', (penalty missed) 69'; Success (yellow card) 40'; Ehizibue (yellow card) 45+4'; Thauvin (yellow card) 90'	Stadium: Stadio Olimpico; Attendance: 61,015; Referee: Antonio Giua

24 April 2023 31	Atalanta	3–1	Roma	Bergamo
20:45 CEST (UTC+2)	De Roon (yellow card) 30'; Pašalić 39'; Tolói 74'; Koopmeiners 84', (yellow card) 90+5'; Palomino (yellow card) 86'	Report	Solbakken (yellow card) 60'; Pellegrini 83'	Stadium: Gewiss Stadium; Attendance: 19,123; Referee: Massimiliano Irrati

29 April 2023 32	Roma	1–1	Milan	Rome
18:00 CEST (UTC+2)	Matić (yellow card) 24'; Ibañez (yellow card) 71'; Cristante (yellow card) 84'; Abraham 90+4'	Report	Tomori (yellow card) 16'; Krunić (yellow card) 75'; Saelemaekers 90+7'	Stadium: Stadio Olimpico; Attendance: 64,191; Referee: Daniele Orsato

3 May 2023 33	Monza	1–1	Roma	Monza
21:00 CEST (UTC+2)	Caldirola 39'; Ciurria (yellow card) 43'; Izzo (yellow card) 90'; Pessina (yellow card) 90+2'	Report	El Shaarawy 24'; Cristante (yellow card) 53'; Pellegrini (yellow card) 58'; Çelik (yellow card) 90+1' (yellow-red card) 90+5'; Dybala (yellow card) 90+3'	Stadium: Stadio Brianteo; Attendance: 12,388; Referee: Daniele Chiffi

6 May 2023 34	Roma	0–2	Internazionale	Rome
18:00 CEST (UTC+2)	Mancini (yellow card) 27'; Pellegrini (yellow card) 58'; Spinazzola (yellow card) 77'	Report	Dimarco 33'; Martínez (yellow card) 65'; Lukaku 74'; Gagliardini (yellow card) 82'	Stadium: Stadio Olimpico; Attendance: 61,870; Referee: Fabio Maresca

14 May 2023 35	Bologna	0–0	Roma	Bologna
18:00 CEST (UTC+2)	Bonifazi (yellow card) 43'; Orsolini (yellow card) 80'	Report	Camara (yellow card) 90+1'	Stadium: Stadio Renato Dall'Ara; Attendance: 23,824; Referee: Daniele Orsato

22 May 2023 36	Roma	2–2	Salernitana	Rome
18:30 CEST (UTC+2)	El Shaarawy 47'; Matić 83'; Zalewski (yellow card) 90+4'	Report	Candreva 12'; Dia 54', (yellow card) 90+5'; Gyömbér (yellow card) 69'; Ochoa (yellow card) 85'; Daniliuc (yellow card) 87'	Stadium: Stadio Olimpico; Attendance: 64,286; Referee: Andrea Colombo

27 May 2023 37	Fiorentina	2–1	Roma	Florence
18:00 CEST (UTC+2)	Saponara (yellow card) 25'; Martínez Quarta (yellow card) 43'; Venuti (yellow card) 50'; Jović (yellow card) 64', (goal) 85'; Igor (yellow card) 77'; Ikoné 88'	Report	El Shaarawy 11'; Missori (yellow card) 32'; Solbakken (yellow card) 58'; Svilar (yellow card) 75'	Stadium: Stadio Artemio Franchi; Attendance: 32,829; Referee: Giovanni Ayroldi

4 June 2023 38	Roma	2–1	Spezia	Rome
21:00 CEST (UTC+2)	Zalewski 43'; Pellegrini (yellow card) 44'; Dybala (yellow card) 78', (goal) 90+1' (pen.)	Report	Nikolaou 6', (yellow card) 58'; Esposito (yellow card) 14'; Zoet (yellow card) 66'; Amian (yellow card) 76' (yellow-red card) 89'; Gyasi (yellow card) 87'; Ampadu (yellow card) 89'; Wiśniewski (yellow card) 90+7'; Shomurodov (yellow card) 90+12'	Stadium: Stadio Olimpico; Attendance: 62,242; Referee: Fabio Maresca

=== Coppa Italia ===
12 January 2023 Round of 16	Roma	1–0	Genoa	Rome
21:00 CET (UTC+1)	Bove (yellow card) 35'; Zaniolo (yellow card) 57'; Dybala 64'	Report	Czyborra (yellow card) 59'; Vogliacco (yellow card) 83'	Stadium: Stadio Olimpico; Attendance: 60,000; Referee: Ermanno Feliciani

1 February 2023 Quarter-finals	Roma	1–2	Cremonese	Rome
21:00 CET (UTC+1)	Patrício (yellow card) 27'; Mancini (yellow card) 29'; Belotti 90+4'	Report	Dessers 28' (pen.), (yellow card) 29'; Çelik 49' (o.g.); Aiwu (yellow card) 60'; Ferrari (yellow card) 62'; Sarr (yellow card) 81'	Stadium: Stadio Olimpico; Attendance: 60,657; Referee: Michael Fabbri

=== UEFA Europa League ===
==== Group stage ====
The draw for the group stage was held on 26 August 2022.

Pos	Team	Pld	W	D	L	GF	GA	GD	Pts	Qualification	BET	ROM	LUD	HJK
1	(Spain) Real Betis	6	5	1	0	12	4	+8	16	Advance to round of 16	—	1–1	3–2	3–0
2	(Italy) Roma	6	3	1	2	11	7	+4	10	Advance to knockout round play-offs	1–2	—	3–1	3–0
3	(Bulgaria) Ludogorets Razgrad	6	2	1	3	8	9	−1	7	Transfer to Europa Conference League	0–1	2–1	—	2–0
4	(Finland) HJK	6	0	1	5	2	13	−11	1		0–2	1–2	1–1	—

Source: UEFA
Rules for classification: Group stage tiebreakers

8 September 2022 1	Ludogorets Razgrad (Bulgaria)	2–1	(Italy) Roma	Razgrad, Bulgaria
18:45 CEST (UTC+2)	Show (yellow card) 38'; Nedyalkov (yellow card) 52'; Piotrowski (yellow card) 68'; Cauly 72'; Nonato 88'	Report	Shomurodov 86'	Stadium: Ludogorets Arena; Attendance: 10,011; Referee: Craig Pawson (England)

15 September 2022 2	Roma (Italy)	3–0	(Finland) HJK	Rome, Italy
21:00 CEST (UTC+2)	Ibañez (yellow card) 25'; Dybala 47'; Pellegrini 49'; Cristante (yellow card) 60'; Belotti 68'	Report	Tenho (red card) 14'; Hetemaj (yellow card) 29'; Halme (yellow card) 87'	Stadium: Stadio Olimpico; Attendance: 60,193; Referee: Radu Petrescu (Romania)

6 October 2022 3	Roma (Italy)	1–2	(Spain) Real Betis	Rome, Italy
21:00 CEST (UTC+2)	Dybala 34' (pen.); Mancini (yellow card) 71'; Zaniolo (red card) 90+3'	Report	Luiz Felipe (yellow card) 29'; Bravo (yellow card) 32'; Guardado (yellow card) 33'; Rodríguez 40'; Pezzella (yellow card) 83'; Luiz Henrique 88'	Stadium: Stadio Olimpico; Attendance: 62,294; Referee: Matej Jug (Slovenia)

13 October 2022 4	Real Betis (Spain)	1–1	(Italy) Roma	Seville, Spain
18:45 CEST (UTC+2)	Guardado (yellow card) 31'; Joaquín (yellow card) 31'; Canales 34'; Miranda (yellow card) 80'; Rodri (yellow card) 90'	Report	Matić (yellow card) 35'; Mancini (yellow card) 44'; Belotti 53'; Camara (yellow card) 58'	Stadium: Benito Villamarín; Attendance: 52,472; Referee: Anastasios Sidiropoulos (Greece)

27 October 2022 5	HJK (Finland)	1–2	(Italy) Roma	Helsinki, Finland
21:00 CEST (UTC+2)	Halme (yellow card) 34'; Hetemaj 54'; Abubakari (yellow card) 82'	Report	Mancini (yellow card) 22'; Abraham 41'; Hoskonen 62' (o.g.); Patrício (yellow card) 82'; Spinazzola (yellow card) 90+4'	Stadium: Bolt Arena; Attendance: 9,751; Referee: Tiago Martins (Portugal)

3 November 2022 6	Roma (Italy)	3–1	(Bulgaria) Ludogorets Razgrad	Rome, Italy
21:00 CET (UTC+1)	Volpato (yellow card) 49'; Pellegrini 56' (pen.), 65' (pen.); Zaniolo 85', (yellow card) 87'; Viña (yellow card) 88'	Report	Cicinho (yellow card) 15'; Rick 41', (yellow card) 79'; Thiago (yellow card) 62'; Nedyalkov (yellow card) 64'; Piotrowski (yellow card) 64'; Verdon (red card) 90'; Nonato (yellow card) 90+1'	Stadium: Stadio Olimpico; Attendance: 60,807; Referee: Nikola Dabanović (Montenegro)

==== Knockout phase ====
===== Knockout round play-offs =====
The draw for the knockout round play-offs was held on 7 November 2022.

16 February 2023 First leg	Red Bull Salzburg (Austria)	1–0	(Italy) Roma	Salzburg, Austria
18:45 CET (UTC+1)	Pavlović (yellow card) 84'; Koïta (yellow card) 86'; Capaldo 88'; Gloukh (yellow card) 90+4'	Report	Ibañez (yellow card) 90+2'	Stadium: Red Bull Arena; Attendance: 29,520; Referee: Dennis Higler (Netherlands)

23 February 2023 Second leg	Roma (Italy)	2–0 (2–1 agg.)	(Austria) Red Bull Salzburg	Rome, Italy
21:00 CET (UTC+1)	Ibañez (yellow card) 4'; Pellegrini (yellow card) 5'; Belotti 33'; Dybala 40'; Spinazzola (yellow card) 54'; Zalewski (yellow card) 74'	Report		Stadium: Stadio Olimpico; Attendance: 62,593; Referee: Slavko Vinčić (Slovenia)

===== Round of 16 =====
The draw for the round of 16 was held on 24 February 2023.

9 March 2023 First leg	Roma (Italy)	2–0	(Spain) Real Sociedad	Rome, Italy
18:45 CET (UTC+1)	El Shaarawy 13'; Kumbulla 87'; Matić (yellow card) 90+4'	Report	Illarramendi (yellow card) 69'; Zubeldia (yellow card) 71'; Gorosabel (yellow card) 80'; Zubimendi (yellow card) 85'; Oyarzabal (yellow card) 90+4'	Stadium: Stadio Olimpico; Attendance: 61,608; Referee: Sandro Schärer (Switzerland)

16 March 2023 Second leg	Real Sociedad (Spain)	0–0 (0–2 agg.)	(Italy) Roma	San Sebastián, Spain
21:00 CET (UTC+1)	Zubeldia (yellow card) 13'; Rico (yellow card) 39'; Fernández (yellow card) 87' (yellow-red card) 90+8'	Report	Karsdorp (yellow card) 6'; Mancini (yellow card) 17'; Smalling (yellow card) 90+8'	Stadium: Anoeta; Attendance: 35,054; Referee: István Kovács (Romania)

===== Quarter-finals =====
The draw for the quarter-finals was held on 17 March 2023.

13 April 2023 First leg	Feyenoord (Netherlands)	1–0	(Italy) Roma	Rotterdam, Netherlands
18:45 CEST (UTC+2)	Wieffer (yellow card) 18', (goal) 53'; Szymański (yellow card) 36'	Report	Pellegrini (penalty missed) 43'	Stadium: De Kuip; Attendance: 42,960; Referee: José María Sánchez Martínez (Spain)

20 April 2023 Second leg	Roma (Italy)	4–1 (a.e.t.) (4–2 agg.)	(Netherlands) Feyenoord	Rome, Italy
21:00 CEST (UTC+2)	Llorente (yellow card) 34'; Spinazzola 60'; Dybala 89', (yellow card) 107'; El Shaarawy 101'; Pellegrini 108'; Abraham (yellow card) 111'; Patrício (yellow card) 118'	Report	Hartman (yellow card) 12'; Wieffer (yellow card) 18'; Giménez (yellow card) 39', (red card) 120'; Paixão 80'	Stadium: Stadio Olimpico; Attendance: 66,742; Referee: Anthony Taylor (England)

===== Semi-finals =====
The draw for the semi-finals was held on 17 March 2023, after the draw for the quarter-finals.

11 May 2023 First leg	Roma (Italy)	1–0	(Germany) Bayer Leverkusen	Rome, Italy
21:00 CEST (UTC+2)	Mancini (yellow card) 58'; Bove 63'; Abraham (yellow card) 76'; Ibañez (yellow card) 89'; Spinazzola (yellow card) 90+3'	Report	Andrich (yellow card) 50'; Diaby (yellow card) 57'; Tah (yellow card) 58'	Stadium: Stadio Olimpico; Attendance: 63,123; Referee: Michael Oliver (England)

18 May 2023 Second leg	Bayer Leverkusen (Germany)	0–0 (0–1 agg.)	(Italy) Roma	Leverkusen, Germany
21:00 CEST (UTC+2)	Hincapié (yellow card) 45+3'; Palacios (yellow card) 56'; Bakker (yellow card) 70'; Diaby (yellow card) 90'; Tapsoba (yellow card) 90+7'	Report	Ibañez (yellow card) 70'; Cristante (yellow card) 89'; Abraham (yellow card) 90+9'	Stadium: BayArena; Attendance: 30,210; Referee: Slavko Vinčić (Slovenia)

===== Final =====
The draw for the final was held on 17 March 2023, after the draws for the quarter-finals and semi-finals, to determine the "home" team for administrative purposes.

31 May 2023 Final	Sevilla (Spain)	1–1 (a.e.t.) (4–1 p)	(Italy) Roma	Budapest, Hungary
21:00 CEST (UTC+2)	Mir (yellow card) 36'; Mancini 55' (o.g.); Rakitić (yellow card) 65'; Lamela (yellow card) 109'; Jordán (yellow card) 120'; Montiel (yellow card) 120+4'; Ocampos (yellow card) 120+10'	Report	Matić (yellow card) 21'; Dybala 35'; Pellegrini (yellow card) 45'; Mancini (yellow card) 48'; Cristante (yellow card) 65'; Çelik (yellow card) 74'; Zalewski (yellow card) 105'; Karsdorp (yellow card) 120+10'	Stadium: Puskás Aréna; Attendance: 61,476; Referee: Anthony Taylor (England)
	Penalties
	Ocampos (penalty scored); Lamela (penalty scored); Rakitić (penalty scored); Montiel (penalty scored)		(penalty scored) Cristante; (penalty missed) Mancini; (penalty missed) Ibañez

== Statistics ==
=== Appearances and goals ===
No.	Pos	Nat	Player	Total		Serie A		Coppa Italia		Europa League	
No.	Pos	Nat	Player	Apps	Goals	Apps	Goals	Apps	Goals	Apps	Goals
Goalkeepers
1	GK	(Portugal) POR	Rui Patrício	51	0	35	0	2	0	14	0
63	GK	(Italy) ITA	Pietro Boer	0	0	0	0	0	0	0	0
99	GK	(Serbia) SRB	Mile Svilar	4	0	3	0	0	0	1	0
Defenders
2	DF	(Netherlands) NED	Rick Karsdorp	18	0	8+5	0	0	0	4+1	0
3	DF	(Brazil) BRA	Roger Ibañez	48	3	32+1	3	2	0	12+1	0
6	DF	(England) ENG	Chris Smalling	47	3	31+1	3	0+1	0	12+2	0
14	DF	(Spain) ESP	Diego Llorente	12	0	5+4	0	0	0	2+1	0
19	DF	(Turkey) TUR	Zeki Çelik	34	0	16+8	0	1+1	0	5+3	0
23	DF	(Italy) ITA	Gianluca Mancini	51	1	33+2	1	2	0	14	0
24	DF	(Albania) ALB	Marash Kumbulla	10	1	5+2	0	0	0	0+3	1
37	DF	(Italy) ITA	Leonardo Spinazzola	40	2	18+8	1	0+1	0	9+4	1
Midfielders
4	MF	(Italy) ITA	Bryan Cristante	53	1	34+2	1	1+1	0	14+1	0
7	MF	(Italy) ITA	Lorenzo Pellegrini	48	8	29+3	4	2	0	14	4
8	MF	(Serbia) SRB	Nemanja Matić	50	2	15+20	2	1+1	0	13	0
20	MF	(Guinea) GUI	Mady Camara	21	0	8+7	0	0	0	2+4	0
25	MF	(Netherlands) NED	Georginio Wijnaldum	23	2	10+4	2	0	0	2+7	0
52	MF	(Italy) ITA	Edoardo Bove	33	2	10+12	1	1	0	2+8	1
55	MF	(The Gambia) GAM	Ebrima Darboe	0	0	0	0	0	0	0	0
59	MF	(Poland) POL	Nicola Zalewski	47	2	26+7	2	1+1	0	8+4	0
62	MF	(Italy) ITA	Cristian Volpato	12	1	2+6	1	0+1	0	1+2	0
68	MF	(Bosnia and Herzegovina) BIH	Benjamin Tahirović	13	0	4+7	0	1+1	0	0	0
Forwards
9	FW	(England) ENG	Tammy Abraham	54	9	24+14	8	1+1	0	10+4	1
11	FW	(Italy) ITA	Andrea Belotti	46	4	11+20	0	1	1	9+5	3
18	FW	(Norway) NOR	Ola Solbakken	14	1	7+7	1	0	0	0	0
21	FW	(Argentina) ARG	Paulo Dybala	38	18	21+4	12	0+2	1	8+3	5
92	FW	(Italy) ITA	Stephan El Shaarawy	42	9	14+15	7	2	0	4+7	2
Players transferred out during the season
14	FW	(Uzbekistan) UZB	Eldor Shomurodov	8	1	1+5	0	0	0	0+2	1
17	DF	(Uruguay) URU	Matías Viña	7	0	1+2	0	0	0	3+1	0
22	MF	(Italy) ITA	Nicolò Zaniolo	17	2	12+1	1	1	0	2+1	1

Source: Competitions
