= Ricardo Solbes =

Argentine footballer

Personal information
- Full name: Ricardo Tomás Solbes Waldmeyer
- Date of birth: 8 July 2006 (age 20)
- Place of birth: San Miguel de Tucumán, Argentina
- Height: 1.75 m (5 ft 9 in)
- Position: Forward

Team information
- Current team: Union Santa Fe II

Youth career
- 2010–2014: El Balón
- 2014–2022: CEF 18
- 2022–2023: Defensa y Justicia
- 2023–2025: Roma
- 2025: → Empoli (loan)
- 2025–: Unión Santa Fe

Senior career*
| Years | Team | Apps | (Gls) |
| 2023 | Defensa y Justicia | 1 | (0) |
| 2025 | Roma | 0 | (0) |
| 2025– | Union Santa Fe II | 0 | (0) |

International career^{‡}
| 2022 | Argentina U17 | 1 | (0) |
- * Club domestic league appearances and goals as of 05:02, 11 August 2023 (UTC) ‡ National team caps and goals as of 05:02, 11 August 2023 (UTC)

Ricardo Tomás Solbes Waldmeyer (born 8 July 2006) is an Argentine professional footballer who plays as a forward for the reserve team of Primera División club Unión Santa Fe.

== Career ==
Solbes is a youth product of his father's academy El Balón, before moving to CEF 18 at the age of 8, and finally moving to Defensa y Justicia's academy in January 2022. He made his senior and professional debut with Defensa y Justicia as a late substitute in a 2–0 Primera División loss to Unión Santa Fe on 28 July 2023. On 10 August 2023, he transferred to Italian Serie A club Roma on a 3+2 year contract, where he was initially assigned to the youth academy.

On 1 August 2025, he returned to Argentina and signed with Primera División club Unión Santa Fe permanently on a free transfer, initially joining the reserve team.

== International career ==
Solbes was called up to the Argentina U17s in May 2022, where he made one appearance.

== Personal life ==
Solbes' father, also called Ricardo, was a professional footballer in Argentina in the 90s. He is nicknamed "Apache" due to his habit of wearing Carlos Tevez's Manchester City jersey.
