= Lovro Golič =

Slovenian footballer (born 2003)

Personal information
- Date of birth: 5 March 2006 (age 20)
- Place of birth: Celje, Slovenia
- Height: 1.93 m (6 ft 4 in)
- Position: Centre-back

Team information
- Current team: Helmond Sport (on loan from KV Mechelen)
- Number: 14

Youth career
- –2022: Domžale
- 2022–2025: Roma

Senior career*
Years	Team	Apps	(Gls)
2022	Domžale	2	(0)
2023–2025	Roma	0	(0)
2025–	KV Mechelen	0	(0)
2025–	Jong KVM	10	(1)
2026–	→ Helmond Sport (loan)	3	(0)

International career^{‡}
2021–2022	Slovenia U16	6	(0)
2022–2023	Slovenia U17	8	(1)
2023–2024	Slovenia U19	10	(0)
2025–	Slovenia U21	2	(0)
- * Club domestic league appearances and goals ‡ National team caps and goals as of 17:34, 19 September 2026 (UTC)

Lovro Golič (born 5 March 2006) is a Slovenian professional footballer who plays as a defender for Eerste Divisie club Helmond Sport, on loan from Belgian Pro League club KV Mechelen.

== Club career ==
As a youth player, Golič joined the youth academy of Slovenian side Domžale and was promoted to the club's senior team in 2022, where he made two league appearances and scored zero goals.

Following his stint there, he joined the youth academy of Italian Serie A side Roma in 2022 and was promoted to the club's senior team in 2023, where he made zero league appearances and scored zero goals. Slovenian news website Sport Klub wrote in 2023 that he was "one of the biggest talents in Slovenian football" while playing for the club. Ahead of the 2025–26 season, he signed for Belgian side KV Mechelen.

On 2 September 2026, Golič joined Eerste Divisie club Helmond Sport on a season-long loan.

== International career ==
Golič is a Slovenia youth international. During the summer of 2025, he played for the Slovenia national under-21 football team at the 2025 UEFA European Under-21 Championship.

== Style of play ==
Golič plays as a centre-back. Right-footed, he is known for his strength and aerial ability.
