= José Mourinho =

Portuguese football manager (born 1963)

José Mourinho GOIH
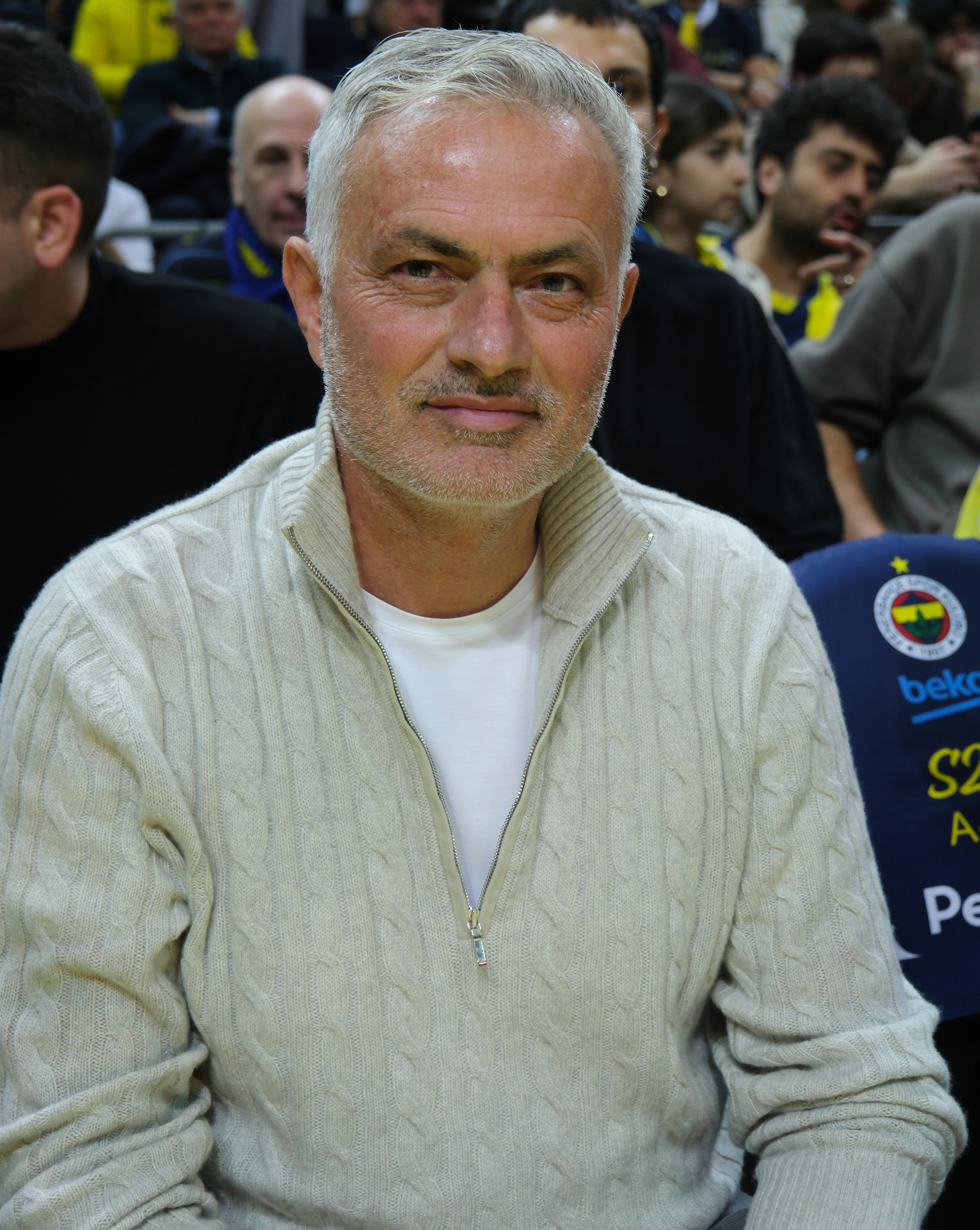
- Mourinho in 2025

Personal information
- Full name: José Mário dos Santos Mourinho Félix
- Date of birth: 26 January 1963 (age 63)
- Place of birth: Setúbal, Portugal
- Height: 1.79 m (5 ft 10 in)
- Position: Midfielder

Team information
- Current team: Real Madrid (head coach)

Youth career
- 1978–1980: Belenenses

Senior career*
Years	Team	Apps	(Gls)
1980–1982	Rio Ave	0	(0)
1982–1983	Belenenses	0	(0)
1983–1985	Sesimbra	35	(1)
1985–1987	Comércio e Indústria	27	(8)
Total		62	(9)

Managerial career
- 2000: Benfica
- 2001–2002: União de Leiria
- 2002–2004: Porto
- 2004–2007: Chelsea
- 2008–2010: Inter Milan
- 2010–2013: Real Madrid
- 2013–2015: Chelsea
- 2016–2018: Manchester United
- 2019–2021: Tottenham Hotspur
- 2021–2024: Roma
- 2024–2025: Fenerbahçe
- 2025–2026: Benfica
- 2026–: Real Madrid
- * Club domestic league appearances and goals

José Mário dos Santos Mourinho Félix (European Portuguese pronunciation: [ʒuˈzɛ moˈɾiɲu]; born 26 January 1963) is a Portuguese professional football manager and former player who is the head coach of La Liga club Real Madrid. Nicknamed "The Special One", he is one of the most decorated managers of all time. Mourinho has won league championships in four countries, is one of only seven managers to have won the European Cup with two clubs, and is the only manager to have won all three current UEFA club competitions. He was named Portuguese Coach of the Century by the Portuguese Football Federation (FPF) in 2015. Due to his tactical knowledge, charismatic and controversial personality, and a reputation for prioritising results over attractive football, he has drawn comparisons—from both admirers and critics—with Argentine manager Helenio Herrera.

After an uneventful career as a midfielder in the Portuguese leagues, Mourinho retired from playing aged 24 and moved into coaching. He was first an interpreter for Bobby Robson at Sporting CP and Porto, before gaining success as an assistant at Barcelona under Robson and his successor, Louis van Gaal. After brief managerial stints at Benfica and União de Leiria, Mourinho returned to Porto in 2002, winning two Primeira Liga titles, the Taça de Portugal, the UEFA Cup and the UEFA Champions League. That success earned him a move to Chelsea in 2004, where he won two Premier League titles, an FA Cup, and two League Cups in three seasons, before departing in 2007 amid reports of disagreements with owner Roman Abramovich.

In 2008, Mourinho joined Italian club Inter Milan. He led them to the Serie A title in his first season, before winning a continental treble—Serie A, the Coppa Italia and the UEFA Champions League—in 2010, a first in history for an Italian club. Later that year, he was crowned the inaugural FIFA World Coach of the Year. Mourinho then moved to Real Madrid in Spain, where he won the La Liga title in 2011–12, breaking several domestic records for points, goals scored, and wins in a season. He rejoined Chelsea in 2013, winning another league title and League Cup, but was dismissed in 2015 after a poor run of results.

Mourinho was appointed manager of Manchester United in 2016 and of Tottenham Hotspur in 2019, but both tenures ended acrimoniously. At Manchester United, he won the Community Shield, League Cup and UEFA Europa League in his first season. At Tottenham, he led the team to a League Cup final. He managed Roma from 2021 to 2024, winning the inaugural UEFA Europa Conference League in his first season. This was Roma's first European title and their first trophy since 2008. The achievement made Mourinho the first manager to win a major European competition with four different clubs and the third to win all UEFA club competitions. After spells at Fenerbahçe and a return to Benfica, he returned to Real Madrid in July 2026.

== Early life and education ==
Mourinho was born in 1963 into a large middle-class family in Setúbal, Portugal, as the son of goalkeeper José Manuel Mourinho Félix, who was known by the name Félix Mourinho, and primary school teacher Maria Júlia Carrajola dos Santos. His father played football professionally for Vitória de Setúbal and Belenenses, earning one cap for Portugal in 1972, and later worked as a football manager and the club director of Vitória de Setúbal. His mother was raised by her uncle Mário Lêdo, who came to control the Setúbal sardine canning industry under António de Oliveira Salazar's Estado Novo and funded the construction of Vitória's Estádio do Bonfim in 1953–1961. Following the regime's downfall in the Carnation Revolution, Lêdo's assets were nationalised during the short-lived Ongoing Revolutionary Process in 1975, but he kept a mansion in Aires near Palmela, where Mourinho grew up with his parents.

=== Education ===
Mourinho failed in the subject of mathematics during the final year of secondary school and this prevented him from finishing high school in time to enroll at the physical education college as was his wish. After finishing secondary school in the special examination period of September, his mother enrolled him in a private business school because there were no vacant seats for him in the physical education college and his mother believed business school would bring him to a more successful career path. Mourinho dropped out of business school on his first day, deciding he would rather focus on sport, and chose to attend the Instituto Superior de Educação Física (ISEF) of the Technical University of Lisbon to study physical education. He was taught there by his mentor Manuel Sérgio, the ex-chairman and deputy director of Belenenses (1975–77), whose humanist approach to kinesiology he later cited as formative. After Mourinho concluded his education in ISEF, he attended coaching courses held by the English and Scottish Football Associations. In this period of his life, former Scotland manager Andy Roxburgh took note of the young Portuguese's drive and attention to detail. Mourinho sought to redefine the role of coach in football by mixing coaching theory with motivational and psychological techniques.

== Playing career ==
Mourinho wanted to follow in his father's footsteps and joined the Belenenses youth team. Graduating to the senior level, he left the club in 1980 to sign for Rio Ave, where he played for the reserve team, and in 1981, was joined by his father, who was named first team manager. There, he struck up a prolific partnership with veteran striker Mário Reis. According to former teammate Baltemar Brito (who would become an assistant to Mourinho early on his managerial career), the duo scored around 100 goals, with Mourinho netting forty-seven times. In addition to playing for the reserves, Mourinho was usually tasked with scouting other teams for his father. He was rarely selected by his father, but he made his debut for the club in the third round of the Taça de Portugal, in a 2–1 extra time win over Salgueiros. On the final day of the campaign against champions-elect Sporting CP, a defender was injured in the pre-match warm up, so he was told to get changed. Club president José Maria Pinho, fearing the threat of nepotism, overruled the decision to do so; the incident saw the pair leave to join Belenenses in the summer.

Mourinho mostly spent the season playing for the reserve team, and he played for the first team in the second round of the Taça de Portugal against Clube Desportivo de Vila Franca, an amateur club from Vila Franca do Campo, São Miguel Island, Azores. With Belenenses 8–0 up at half-time, Mourinho came on as a second-half substitute and scored a hat-trick as the team won 17–0, which remains the club's biggest ever victory in the tournament. When his father returned to Rio Ave, Mourinho did not go with him and continued to play in the lower levels of the Portuguese football league system, first with Sesimbra, and then for Comércio e Indústria, where he finished his career. At the latter club, he was captain of the team and saved the life of a teammate who was trapped in a car that had caught fire. Mourinho decided that he lacked the requisite pace and power to become a professional and chose to focus on becoming a football coach instead.

== Coaching career ==
After leaving his job as a physical education teacher, Mourinho looked for a path into football management in his hometown and became youth team coach at Vitória de Setúbal in the early 1990s. He accepted the position of assistant manager at Estrela da Amadora, then was a scout at Ovarense. In 1992, an opportunity arose to work for a top foreign coach: Bobby Robson had been appointed manager of Lisbon club Sporting CP and needed an English-speaking local coach to work as interpreter. His presentation to fans was on 7 July, alongside president Sousa Cintra, manager Robson and Manuel Fernandes.

Mourinho began discussing tactics and coaching with Robson in his interpreting role. Robson was sacked in December 1993. When Porto appointed him as head coach, Mourinho moved with him, continuing to coach and interpret. The Porto team, consisting of players like Ljubinko Drulović, Domingos, Rui Barros, Jorge Costa and Vítor Baía, dominated Portuguese football in the following years. With Robson as head coach and Mourinho as his assistant, Porto reached the 1993–94 UEFA Champions League semi-finals and won the 1993–94 Taça de Portugal, the 1994–95 and 1995–96 Portuguese championship, and the 1994, 1995 and 1996 Portuguese Super Cup, the latter with a 5–0 victory over arch-rivals Benfica, in what proved to be Robson's last game at Porto, earning Robson the nickname "Bobby Five-O" in Portugal.

After two years at Porto, the duo moved again, joining Barcelona in 1996. Mourinho became a prominent staff member by translating at press conferences, planning practice sessions and helping players through tactical advice and analyses of the opposition. Robson and Mourinho's styles complemented each other: the Englishman favoured an attacking style, while Mourinho covered defensive options, and the Portuguese's love of planning and training combined with Robson's direct man-management. The Barcelona attack was led by Ronaldo in his prime – whom Mourinho regards as the best player post-Maradona. The partnership was fruitful and Barcelona finished the season by winning the European Cup Winners' Cup, the Copa del Rey and Supercopa de España. Robson moved clubs the following season but Mourinho did not follow, as Barcelona was keen to retain him as assistant manager. The two remained good friends and Mourinho later reflected on the effect Robson had upon him:

One of the most important things I learnt from Bobby Robson is that when you win, you shouldn't assume you are the team, and when you lose, you shouldn't think you are rubbish.

He began working with Robson's successor, Louis van Gaal, and learned much from the Dutchman's conscientious style. Both assistant and head coach combined their studious approach and Barcelona won La Liga twice in Van Gaal's first two years. Van Gaal saw that his number two had the promise to be more than a skilled assistant. He let Mourinho develop his own independent coaching style and entrusted him with the coaching duties of Barcelona B. Van Gaal also let Mourinho take charge of the first team (acting as Mourinho's assistant himself) for certain trophies, like the Copa Catalunya, which Barcelona won in 2000.

== Managerial career ==
=== Benfica ===
The chance to become a top-tier manager arrived in September 2000 when Mourinho was appointed as the replacement for Benfica manager Jupp Heynckes after the fourth week of the Primeira Liga.

When I spoke with Van Gaal about going back to Portugal to be an assistant at Benfica, he said: "No, don't go. Tell Benfica if they want a first-team coach you will go; if they want an assistant you will stay."

The Benfica hierarchy wanted to appoint Jesualdo Ferreira as the new assistant coach, but Mourinho refused and picked Carlos Mozer, a retired Benfica defender, as his right-hand man instead. Mourinho was highly critical of Ferreira, whom he had first encountered as his teacher at ISEF and later lambasted the veteran coach by stating, "This could be the story of a donkey who worked for 30 years but never became a horse."

Only weeks after being given the job at Benfica, Mourinho's mentor, Bobby Robson, offered him the assistant manager's role at Newcastle United. Such was Robson's desperation for Mourinho to join him he offered to step down after two years in charge and hand over the reins to Mourinho. Mourinho turned the offer down and said he knew Robson would never step down at the club he loved.

Mourinho and Mozer proved a popular combination, enjoying a 3–0 win against rivals Sporting CP in December. Their reign appeared to be at risk after Benfica's election turned against club president João Vale e Azevedo and the newly elected Manuel Vilarinho said that he would instate ex-Benfica player Toni as his new coach. Although Vilarinho had no intention of firing him immediately, Mourinho used the victory over Sporting to test the president's loyalty and he asked for a contract extension. Vilarinho refused the demand and Mourinho resigned from his position immediately. He left the club on 5 December 2000 after just nine league games in charge. Upon later reflection, Vilarinho rued his poor judgement and expressed his frustration at losing Mourinho:

[Put me] back then [and] I would do exactly the opposite: I would extend his contract. Only later I realised that one's personality and pride cannot be put before the interest of the institution we serve.

=== União de Leiria ===
Mourinho found a new managerial post in July 2001 with União de Leiria. During his time at União de Leiria, the team was on a run contesting places as high as third and fourth. After a 1–1 draw against Santa Clara on 20 January 2002, Mourinho recorded eight matches unbeaten in the league (six wins, two draws) since 25 November 2001. At this time the team was in fourth place, one point ahead of Porto, one point behind Benfica and six points behind the top of the league table. Mourinho's successes at Leiria did not go unrecognised and he caught the attention of larger Portuguese clubs.

=== Porto ===
Mourinho was then chosen by Porto to replace Octávio Machado on 23 January 2002. At this time, Porto was in fifth place in the Liga (behind Sporting CP, Boavista, União de Leiria and Benfica), had been eliminated from the Taça de Portugal and was in last place in their UEFA Champions League second group stage. Mourinho guided the team to third place that year after a strong 15-game run (including 11 wins) and gave the promise of "making Porto champions next year".

He quickly identified several key players as the backbone of what he believed would be a perfect Porto team: Vítor Baía, Ricardo Carvalho, Costinha, Deco, Dmitri Alenichev and Hélder Postiga. He recalled captain Jorge Costa after a six-month loan to Charlton Athletic. Signings from other clubs included Nuno Valente and Derlei from União de Leiria; Paulo Ferreira from Vitória de Setúbal; César Peixoto from Belenenses; Pedro Emanuel from Boavista; and Edgaras Jankauskas and Maniche, who both had been out of contract at Benfica.

==== 2002–03: First league title and European treble ====
In 2003, Mourinho won his first Primeira Liga with a 27–5–2 record, 11 points clear of Benfica, the team he quit two years earlier. The total of 86 points out of the possible maximum of 102 was a Portuguese record, until the 2015–16 season won by Benfica (88 points), since the rule of three points per win was introduced. Mourinho also won the Taça de Portugal, beating Leiria, a club he previously managed, in the final, and Celtic in UEFA Cup final, both in May 2003.

==== 2003–04: Final season and Champions League title ====
The following season witnessed further successes: he led Porto to victory in the one-match Portuguese Super Cup, beating Leiria 1–0. They lost the UEFA Super Cup 1–0 to Milan, with Andriy Shevchenko scoring the only goal. The team was dominant in the Primeira Liga and finished the season with a perfect home record, an eight-point advantage and a 27-match unbeaten run that ran from the start of the season until early April, when they lost to Gil Vicente. They secured the title five weeks before the end of the season. Porto lost the 2004 Taça de Portugal Final to Benfica in May 2004, but two weeks later, Mourinho won a greater prize: the UEFA Champions League, with a 3–0 win over Monaco in Germany. The club had eliminated Manchester United, Lyon and Deportivo de La Coruña and their sole defeat of the competition came against Real Madrid in the group round.

In the first leg between Manchester United and Porto, United manager Alex Ferguson confronted Mourinho after Roy Keane received a red card for stamping on Vítor Baía. In the second leg at Old Trafford, Porto were on the verge of an away-goals defeat when Costinha scored in the 89th minute to win the tie. Mourinho flamboyantly celebrated the goal by leaving his dugout, punching the air as he sprinted down the sideline near to his celebrating players. Mourinho's Porto win over Ferguson's United was a preview of his move to the Premier League managing Chelsea, where the two men would enjoy a competitive but respectful relationship. In 2005, after Chelsea clinched the Premier League title, Ferguson had his players form a guard of honour at Chelsea's next game at Old Trafford, a favour that Mourinho returned in 2007 at Stamford Bridge, after Ferguson's squad were confirmed league champions.

Liverpool are a team that interests everyone and Chelsea does not interest me so much because it is a new project with lots of money invested in it. I think it is a project which, if the club fail to win everything, then [Roman] Abramovich could retire and take the money out of the club. It's an uncertain project. It is interesting for a coach to have the money to hire quality players but you never know if a project like this will bring success.

Liverpool offered their managerial position to Rafael Benítez, and Mourinho instead accepted a large offer from Roman Abramovich and pledged his immediate future to Chelsea.

=== Chelsea ===
On 2 June 2004, Mourinho moved to Chelsea on a three-year contract, after a £1.7 million compensation package was agreed with Porto, making him the first Portuguese manager in the Premier League. In a press conference upon joining the English side, Mourinho spoke on Chelsea's credentials, stating: "We have top players and, sorry if I'm arrogant, we have a top manager", before adding,

Please don't call me arrogant, but I'm European champion and I think I'm a special one.

This comment resulted in the media dubbing him "The Special One", and his braggadocio was widely recognised during his early managerial career. Mourinho recruited his backroom staff from Porto, consisting of assistant manager Baltemar Brito, fitness coach Rui Faria, chief scout André Villas-Boas and goalkeeping coach Silvino Louro. He retained Steve Clarke, a long-serving former player at Chelsea, who had also performed an assistant managerial-type role under previous managers at the club. In terms of spending, Mourinho carried on where his predecessor Claudio Ranieri left off, as, bankrolled by Roman Abramovich, he spent in excess of £70 million in transfer fees on players such as Tiago (£10 million), Michael Essien (£24.4 million), Didier Drogba (£24 million), Mateja Kežman (£5.4 million), Ricardo Carvalho (£19.8 million) and Paulo Ferreira (£13.3 million).

==== 2004–06: First trophies in England ====
Under Mourinho, Chelsea built on the potential developed in the previous season. By early December, they were at the top of the Premier League table and had reached the knock-out stages of the Champions League. He secured his first trophy by winning the League Cup against Liverpool 3–2 (AET) in Cardiff. Towards the end of the match, Mourinho was escorted from the touchline after putting his finger to his mouth in the direction of Liverpool fans, as a response to taunts directed towards him whilst Liverpool were leading.

Chelsea met Barcelona in the Champions League round of 16, a highly contested match where the Blues lost away in the first leg 2–1 but advanced on aggregate, winning at home 4–2. In the quarter-finals against Bayern Munich, Mourinho who was banned from attending the stadium, waited in the dressing room before the match to talk to his players, then he hid in a laundry basket to leave the stadium. Chelsea were knocked out of the competition by a controversial goal in the semi-finals by eventual winners Liverpool. Under Mourinho, Chelsea secured their first top-flight domestic title in 50 years, setting a string of English football records in the process, including the most points ever achieved in the Premier League (95) and the fewest goals conceded (15).

Chelsea started the next season well: they defeated Arsenal 2–1 to win the 2005 FA Community Shield and topped the Premier League from the first weekend of the 2005–06 season. Chelsea beat rivals Manchester United 3–0 to win their second consecutive Premier League title and Mourinho's fourth domestic title in a row. After the presentation of his championship medal, Mourinho threw Robert Huth's into the crowd. Mourinho was awarded a second medal for Huth within minutes, which he also threw into the crowd.

==== 2006–07: Continued domestic success ====
The 2006–07 season saw growing media speculation that Mourinho would leave the club at the season's conclusion due to alleged poor relations with owner Roman Abramovich and a power struggle with sporting director Frank Arnesen and Abramovich advisor Piet de Visser. Mourinho later cleared doubts regarding his future at Stamford Bridge, stating that there would only be two ways for him to leave Chelsea: if Chelsea did not offer him a new contract before the expiry of his current deal in June 2010, or if Chelsea were to sack him.

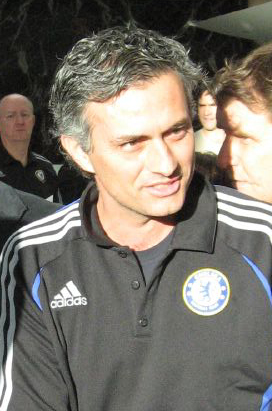
Mourinho with Chelsea in 2007

Didier Drogba had the highest scoring season of his career that year and this led to his newly signed strike partner Andrey Shevchenko to be dropped from the starting line-up towards the end of the season by Mourinho. Notably, in the Champions League semi-final match against Liverpool at Anfield, Shevchenko was not even included on the bench. The other high-profile arrival besides Shevchenko was German captain Michael Ballack, a free agent from Bayern Munich who was signed to strengthen the midfield. The Icelandic striker Eiður Guðjohnsen departed the club for Barcelona.

Despite the unrest, Chelsea won the League Cup again by defeating Arsenal at the Millennium Stadium. The possibility of the quadruple was brought to an end on 1 May 2007 when Liverpool eliminated Chelsea from the Champions League on penalties at Anfield, following a 1–1 aggregate draw. Days later, Chelsea drew 1–1 with Arsenal at the Emirates, which secured the Premier League title for Manchester United. This was Mourinho's first season without a league title win in five years. Mourinho led Chelsea to a 1–0 victory against Manchester United in the 2007 FA Cup Final, winning in the first final to be played at the rebuilt Wembley. This was his first FA Cup win which meant that he had won every domestic trophy available to a Premier League manager.

There was to be further friction between Mourinho and Abramovich when Avram Grant was appointed as director of football, despite objections from Mourinho. Grant's position was further enhanced by being given a seat on the board. In spite of these tensions, the 2007–08 transfer season would see the departure of Dutch winger Arjen Robben to Real Madrid and the arrival of French midfielder Florent Malouda from Lyon.

==== 2007–08: Departure ====
In the first match of the 2007–08 season, Chelsea beat Birmingham City 3–2 to set a new record of 64 consecutive home league matches without defeat. Despite surpassing the record set by Liverpool between 1978 and 1981, the start to the 2007–08 season was less successful than previous starts. The team lost at Aston Villa and followed this with a goalless draw at home to Blackburn Rovers. Their opening game in the UEFA Champions League saw them only manage a 1–1 home draw against the Norwegian team Rosenborg in front of only 24,973 (an almost half-empty stadium), which included an unimpressed owner Roman Abramovich.

Mourinho unexpectedly left Chelsea on 20 September 2007 "by mutual consent", although there had been a series of disagreements with owner Abramovich. The Chelsea board held an emergency meeting and decided it was time to part with their manager. Mourinho left as the most successful manager in Chelsea's history, having won six trophies for the club in three years. He was also undefeated in all home league games.

=== Inter Milan ===
On 2 June 2008, Mourinho was appointed the successor of Roberto Mancini at Inter Milan on a three-year contract and brought along with him much of his backroom staff who had served him at both Chelsea and Porto. He chose Giuseppe Baresi, a former Inter player and ex-head coach of their youth academy, as his assistant. He spoke solely in Italian in his first press conference as Inter boss, claiming to have learnt it "in three weeks". Mourinho stated that he only intended to make a few major signings in the summer. By the end of the transfer window, he had brought three new players to the side: Brazilian winger Mancini (€13 million), Ghanaian midfielder Sulley Muntari for a reported €14 million and Portuguese winger Ricardo Quaresma for a cash/player exchange fee of €18.6 million plus young Portuguese midfielder Pelé.

==== 2008–09: First Serie A title ====
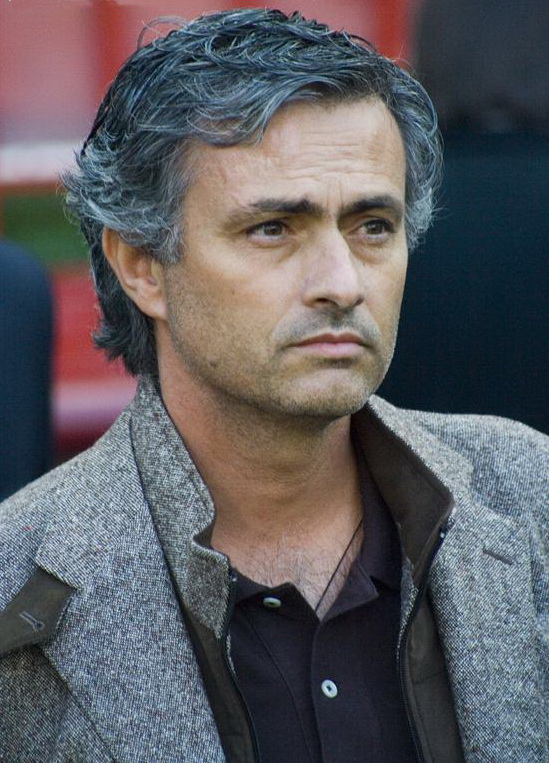
Mourinho as Inter Milan coach in 2008

In his first season as Inter head coach, Mourinho won the Supercoppa Italiana, beating Roma on penalties, and finished top of Serie A. Inter were eliminated 2–0 on aggregate by Manchester United in the first knock-out round of the Champions League, and he also failed to win the Coppa Italia, losing 3–1 on aggregate to Sampdoria in the semi-finals. As UEFA was beginning to push the larger clubs in top leagues to play more homegrown players, Mourinho regularly played 18-year-old Italian forward Mario Balotelli and promoted academy defender Davide Santon to the first team permanently, installing an Italian contingent into a team previously composed of mostly foreign players. Both teenagers played a part in the Scudetto-winning season and played enough games to earn their first senior trophy.

Despite his domestic successes in winning the Scudetto by a 10-point margin, Mourinho's first season in Italy was viewed as disappointing by some Inter fans, as the club failed to improve on the performances of his predecessor Roberto Mancini in the Champions League. Inter put in a series of lacklustre group stage performances that included a shock 1–0 home loss to Panathinaikos and an away draw with Cypriot minnows Anorthosis Famagusta. Inter qualified for the knockout stages of the Champions League but failed to make it to the quarter-finals after being defeated by Manchester United.

On 16 May 2009, Inter mathematically won the Serie A title after runners-up Milan lost to Udinese. This loss left the Nerazzurri seven points above their crosstown rivals with only two games remaining. They would eventually finish 10 points clear of Milan.

==== 2009–10: Final season in Italy and historic treble ====
On 28 July 2009, Mourinho was reported to have shown interest in taking over at Manchester United when Ferguson retired. He was quoted as saying, "I would consider going to Manchester United but United have to consider if they want me to succeed Sir Alex Ferguson. If they do, then of course."

Adriano left Inter in April 2009, and the exit of the Brazilian striker was followed by the Argentine duo Julio Cruz and Hernán Crespo. Portuguese attacking midfielder and veteran Luís Figo retired. Figo was on the verge of leaving Inter under Mancini due to a lack of playing time, but in his final season Mourinho used him frequently. Mourinho signed Argentine striker Diego Milito, who fell just one goal short of winning the top scorer award with former club Genoa, and Thiago Motta, a combative player able to control the game with his passing, to bolster the midfield. Perhaps his most notable summer signing of his second season was a swap deal of Zlatan Ibrahimović in exchange for Barcelona's Cameroonian striker Samuel Eto'o and a reported £35 million. This transfer was the second most expensive in the history of the transfer market, after Cristiano Ronaldo moved from Manchester United to Real Madrid earlier in the summer. Eto'o got off to a promising start with Inter by scoring two goals in the first two matches of the season.

Ricardo Quaresma's signing from Mourinho's old club Porto was viewed as providing a missing link in the Inter squad, but his play disappointed the club and led him to be loaned out to Chelsea midway through the season. Mancini also failed to dominate the midfield and addressing these shortcomings became a priority for Inter. Inter's lack of a playmaker had been blamed for the Champions League failure. In an attempt to deal with this, Inter signed Dutch midfielder Wesley Sneijder from Real Madrid.

Inter struggled in their first two matches of the new season. The team lost the Supercoppa to Lazio 2–1 and drew 1–1 with newly promoted Bari at the San Siro. Mourinho's team improved dramatically afterwards, as he built a formidable midfield with Sneijder at its heart, along with new signing Thiago Motta and veterans Javier Zanetti and Dejan Stanković. Inter scored more than 30 goals before December, thrashing derby rivals Milan 4–0, with new signings Diego Milito and Motta scoring, and hammering Genoa 5–0, the largest margin of victory in the Serie A that season. Mourinho was sent off in the December Derby d'Italia away fixture after he sarcastically applauded the referee for what he felt was a dubious free-kick given to Juventus. Inter went on to lose 2–1, courtesy of a Claudio Marchisio winner.

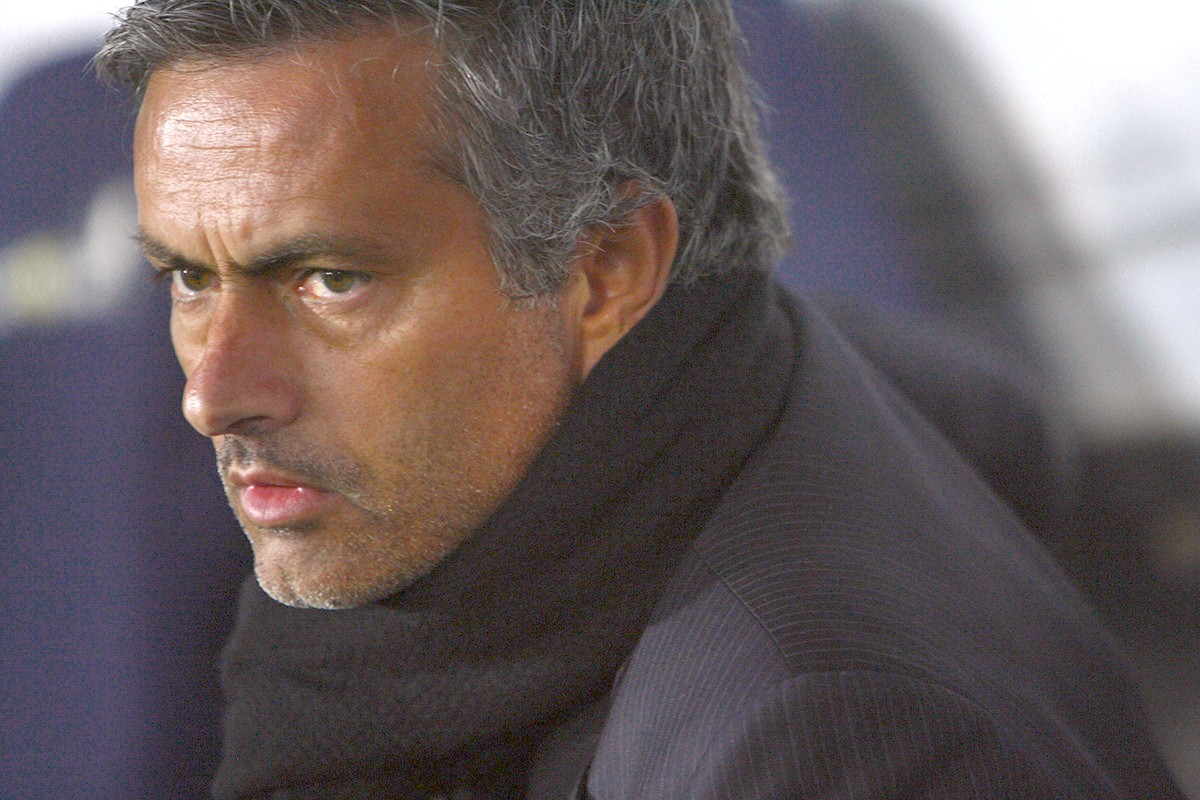
Mourinho in 2009

Mourinho achieved what was hailed as a career highlight after Inter managed to progress to the Champions League quarter-finals by defeating his former team Chelsea in both legs (2–1 win at San Siro, then a 1–0 win at Stamford Bridge). His difficult relationship with young striker Mario Balotelli and the team's loss of form that led Inter to achieve only seven points in six games (with three of those, including a shock 1–3 defeat to Sicilian minnows Catania, happening during Mourinho's ban) were criticised by the media.

On 6 April 2010, Mourinho became the first manager to take three teams to the semi-finals of the Champions League (equalled by Bayern Munich's Louis van Gaal a day later) after Inter defeated CSKA Moscow in Russia in the second leg of their quarter-final tie, which ended 2–0 on aggregate, with Wesley Sneijder's goal in the sixth minute proving decisive. This marked the first time in seven years that Inter made the semi-finals of the competition. On 13 April, Inter reached the Coppa Italia final, for the first time under Mourinho, in a 1–0 away (2–0 on aggregate) victory over Fiorentina.

On 28 April, Mourinho reached the Champions League final for the second time after Inter beat holders Barcelona 3–2 on aggregate, despite losing 1–0 at Camp Nou (which Mourinho called "the most beautiful defeat of my life"). This brought Inter back into a European Cup final 38 years after their last appearance. Mourinho was involved in a confrontation with Barcelona goalkeeper Víctor Valdés while attempting to join in with the Inter celebrations. Mourinho stated that "anti-Madridismo" had motivated the Barça fans, suggesting that they were obsessed with reaching the final and winning the tournament on their arch-rival's home ground. Marca proclaimed that Mourinho had passed the test to become the next head coach of Real Madrid, as their fans celebrated the elimination of Barcelona.

On 5 May 2010, the team won the Coppa Italia, defeating Roma 1–0, and on 16 May 2010, Inter beat Siena 1–0 to secure the domestic double. On 22 May, Inter won the 2010 Champions League beating Bayern Munich 2–0, and became the first Italian club to complete the treble, with Mourinho celebrating the second Champions League title in his career.

The day after winning the Champions League, Mourinho said that he was "sad, as almost for sure it's my last game with Inter". He then added that "if you don't coach Real Madrid then you will always have a gap in your career". A world-record-breaking compensation package was successfully agreed on 28 May 2010, and Mourinho was released by Inter.

=== Real Madrid ===
On 28 May 2010, it was confirmed that Mourinho would take over from Manuel Pellegrini at the Santiago Bernabéu. On 31 May 2010, Mourinho was unveiled as the new head coach of Real Madrid after signing a four-year contract, and became the eleventh coach at the club in the previous seven years. Mourinho was appointed sporting manager as well as first-team coach, and he was referred to as a Galáctico, a term more often used for star players instead of coaches.

Prior to Mourinho's arrival, Real Madrid had underperformed, despite paying record transfer fees for Galácticos such as Kaká and Cristiano Ronaldo. Their 2009–10 season was marked by disappointments such as Alcorconazo, a shock 2009–10 Copa del Rey round of 32 defeat to Segunda División B team Alcorcón, and elimination from the Champions League by Lyon in the round of 16, though they finished second in La Liga with a club record 96 points. By the end of the transfer window, after the 2010 FIFA World Cup, Mourinho had brought four new players to the squad: the Germans Sami Khedira (€13 million) and Mesut Özil (€15 million), Portuguese defender Ricardo Carvalho (€8 million) and Argentine winger Ángel Di María (€25 million plus €11 million on incentives).

==== 2010–11: First season in Spain ====
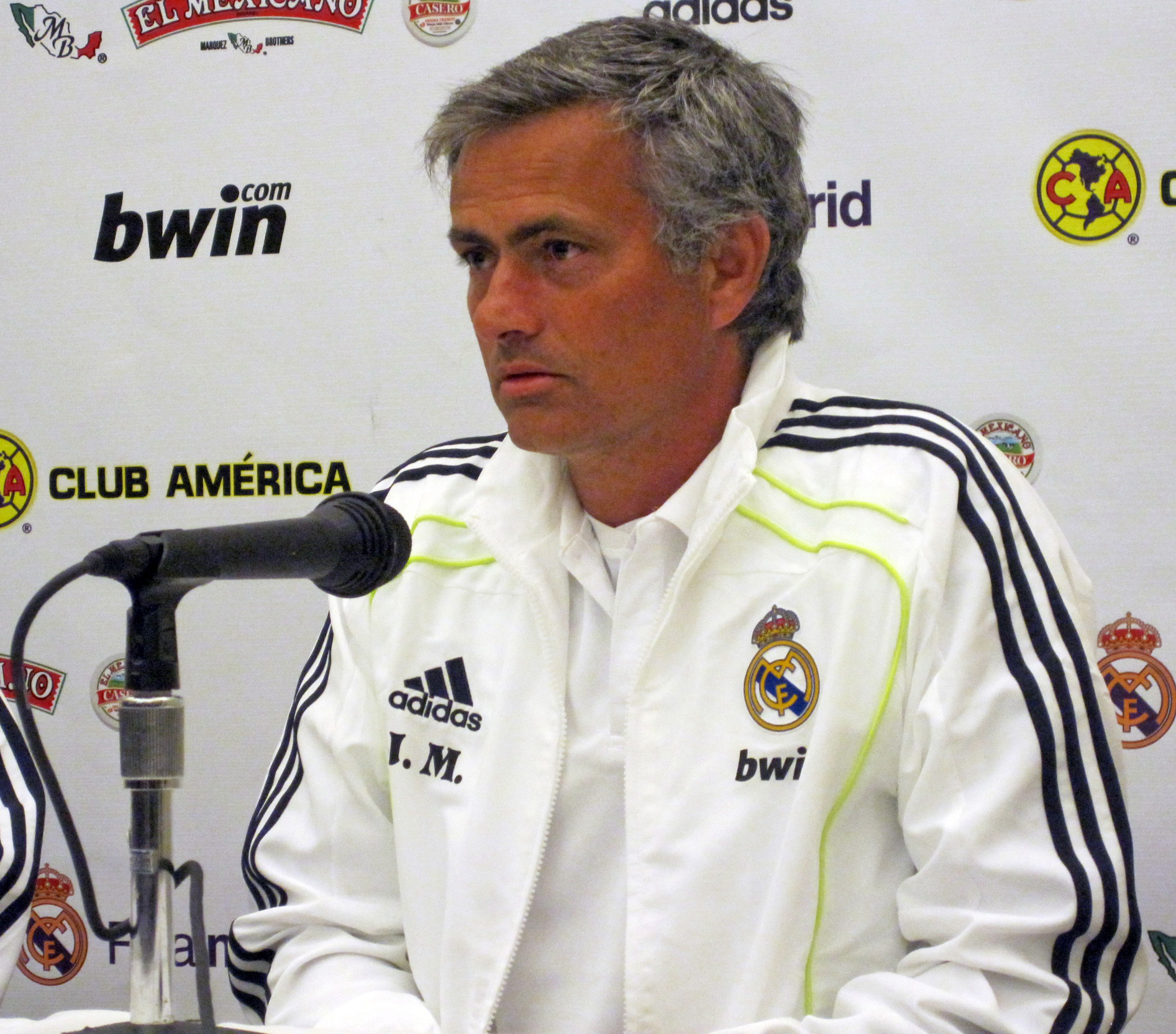
Mourinho with Real Madrid in 2010

On 29 August 2010, Real Madrid drew 0–0 at Mallorca in Mourinho's first La Liga game as coach. When asked about all the missed opportunities against Levante in La Liga and Auxerre in the Champions League, Mourinho said, "One day some poor rival is going to pay for the chances we've missed today." The following match at the Bernabéu ended with a 6–1 victory over Deportivo de La Coruña. The following league games confirmed Mourinho's statement, defeating Málaga 4–1 and Racing Santander 6–1.

On 29 November 2010, Mourinho's Madrid were defeated in his first El Clásico encounter against Barcelona. The match, held in Camp Nou, ended 5–0 to the hosts, with Real Madrid director Florentino Pérez regarding it the worst game in the history of Real Madrid. Sporting director Jorge Valdano also criticised Mourinho for his "inability to bring a major correction to the game" and "not leaving his bench for the [majority] of the match". When asked by a media reporter, Mourinho refused to call the loss a humiliation.

On 30 November 2010, Mourinho was fined £33,500 for appearing to instruct Xabi Alonso and Sergio Ramos to attempt to receive a tactical second yellow card in the 4–0 Champions League win against Ajax. He was also banned for two Champions League matches. On 22 December 2010, Mourinho won a match by the widest margin in his career, winning 8–0 against Levante, also of La Liga, in the first leg of their quarter-final of the Copa del Rey.

On 20 April 2011, Mourinho won his first trophy in Spanish football as Real Madrid defeated arch-rivals Barcelona 1–0 in the Copa del Rey final held at the Mestalla in Valencia, ending Real Madrid's 18-year-long Copa del Rey drought. It was also Real's first trophy since their 2007–08 La Liga title. One week later, the two teams met again in the first leg of the semi-finals of the Champions League, Real Madrid's furthest progress in the tournament since the 2003 semi-finals, as the club was knocked out in the 2004 quarter-finals, and then from 2005 to 2010 the club had suffered six consecutive exits at the round of 16. At the Bernabéu, Real's Pepe was dismissed in the 61st minute and Mourinho was sent to the stands for protesting; afterward, Barça's Lionel Messi scored two late goals to take control of the tie. The second leg at Camp Nou finished 1–1, which eliminated Real from the tournament.

==== 2011–12: Record breaking La Liga title ====
On 7 December 2011, Real Madrid defeated Ajax with a 3–0 scoreline and concluded the Champions League group stage with six victories, becoming the fifth team in Champions League history to accomplish the feat. The victory was the team's 15th consecutive win to equal a club record set 50 years earlier, in 1961. On 21 April 2012, Real Madrid won 2–1 against Barcelona in El Clásico at Camp Nou, extending their lead in La Liga to seven points with four matches remaining. This was the first victory for Real Madrid in La Liga against their archrivals since 2008 and the first overall at Camp Nou since 2007. Also, in this match Real Madrid broke the record for most goals scored in the championship, with 109. Barça manager Pep Guardiola conceded the title to Real Madrid.

Mourinho's side advanced to the semi-finals of the Champions League for the second consecutive year. The first leg away finished with a 2–1 win to Bayern Munich. In the second leg at home, Real Madrid took a 2–0 lead from two Cristiano Ronaldo goals but Bayern's Arjen Robben (a former Real player whom Mourinho previously managed at Chelsea) converted a penalty to level the aggregate score at 3–3, and Madrid was eliminated in the shootout with Ronaldo, Kaká and Ramos all failing to convert their spot kicks. Bayern manager Jupp Heynckes said that Mourinho "came to the dressing room to congratulate my players and coaching staff after the game. It was very noble".

On 2 May 2012, Real Madrid won 3–0 against Athletic Bilbao to clinch the Liga title for the first time in four years. On 13 May 2012, Real Madrid defeated Mallorca 4–1 in their last league match of the season, which set records for most games won in a La Liga season (32), most away wins (16), most points obtained in any of the top European leagues (100), improving the most goals scored record they already had set earlier (121) and finishing the season with the highest goal difference (+89). Real Madrid topped the league nine points clear of runners-up Barcelona.

==== 2012–13: Final season in Madrid ====
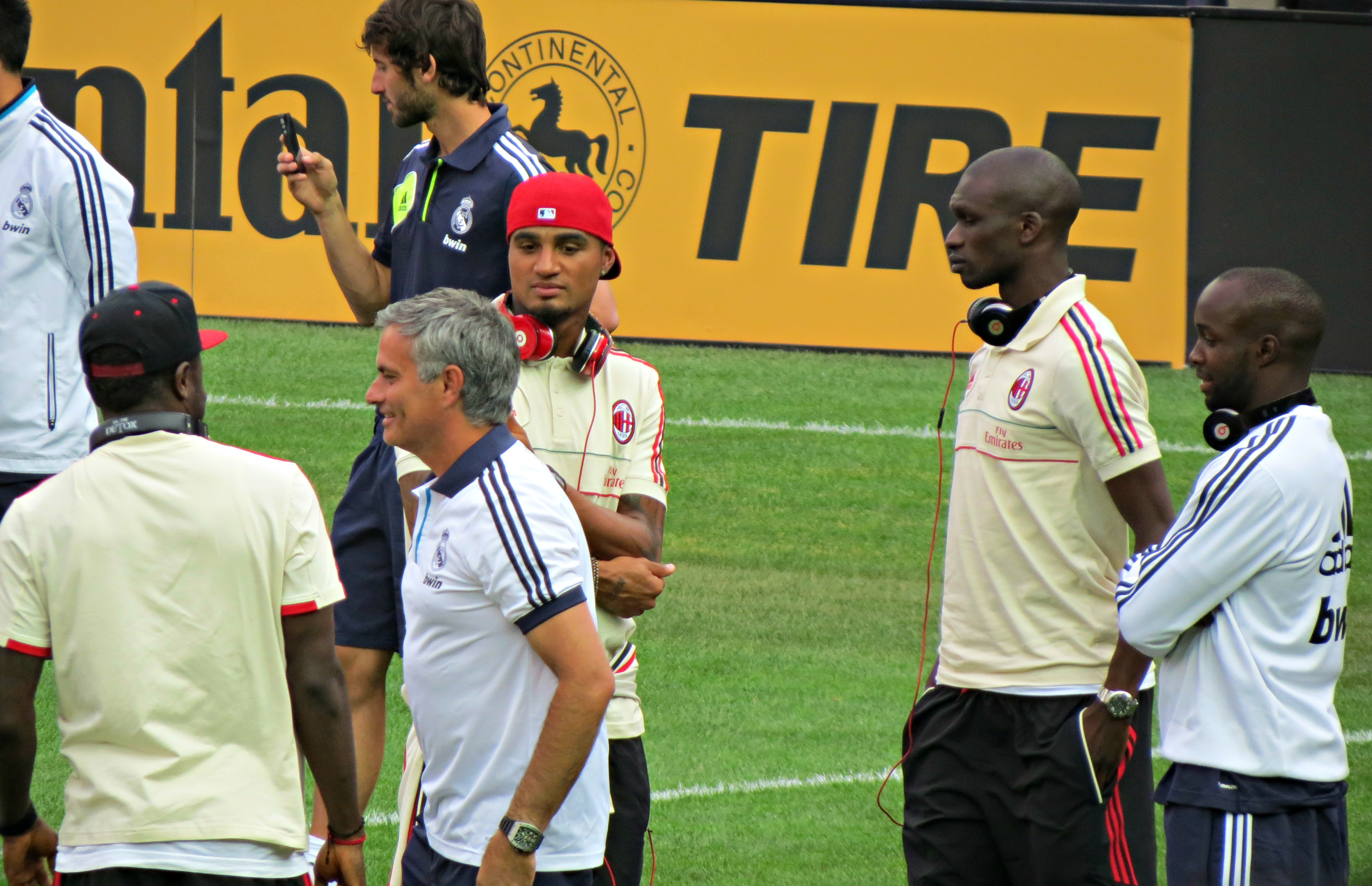
Mourinho with A.C. Milan players prior to a pre-season match with Real Madrid in New York City, 2012

On 22 May 2012, Mourinho signed a new four-year contract to remain as Real Madrid manager through to 2016. After losing 3–2 in Barcelona in the first leg of the 2012 Supercopa de España, Real Madrid won the return leg in Madrid 2–1. Real Madrid won the competition on the away goals rule after a tie of 4–4 on aggregate. This meant Mourinho had won every domestic title available for a manager in the Spanish top division within two years. He became the only coach who has won the national super cups in four European countries. This also made Mourinho the first manager in history to win every domestic title, the league championship, cup, super cup and league cup (if available) in four European leagues.

Real Madrid reached the semi-finals of the Champions League for the third consecutive year under Mourinho's management. The club was defeated 4–1 in the first leg away at Borussia Dortmund. In the second leg at home, Real managed to score two goals in the last 10 minutes, but the team could not get the third goal that would have levelled the aggregate score and sent them through on away goals.

In the post-game press conference after the second leg with Dortmund, Mourinho hinted that the 2012–13 season with Real Madrid would be his last, saying, "I am loved by some clubs, especially one. In Spain it is different, some people hate me, many of you in this [press] room." Mourinho's fraught relationships with Sergio Ramos and club captain Iker Casillas (a popular player whom Mourinho sidelined in 2013) caused divisions between fans in the "Mourinhistas" and "Madridistas" (the more traditional Real Madrid fans) camps. His relationship with Cristiano Ronaldo became difficult because, according to Mourinho, the player "maybe thinks that he knows everything and that the coach cannot improve him anymore", so was unwilling to accept constructive criticism. Mourinho was also criticised for controversial incidents, including poking Tito Vilanova (then assistant coach at Barcelona) in the eye during a brawl, continual complaints about refereeing bias, clashes with journalists and Real officials, and frequent hints that Barça received favourable treatment from UEFA.

Following the 2013 Copa del Rey final loss to Atlético Madrid on 17 May, Mourinho called the 2012–13 season "the worst of my career". Three days later, Real Madrid president Florentino Pérez announced Mourinho would leave the club at the end of the season by "mutual agreement", a year after signing a contract extension to 2016.

=== Return to Chelsea ===
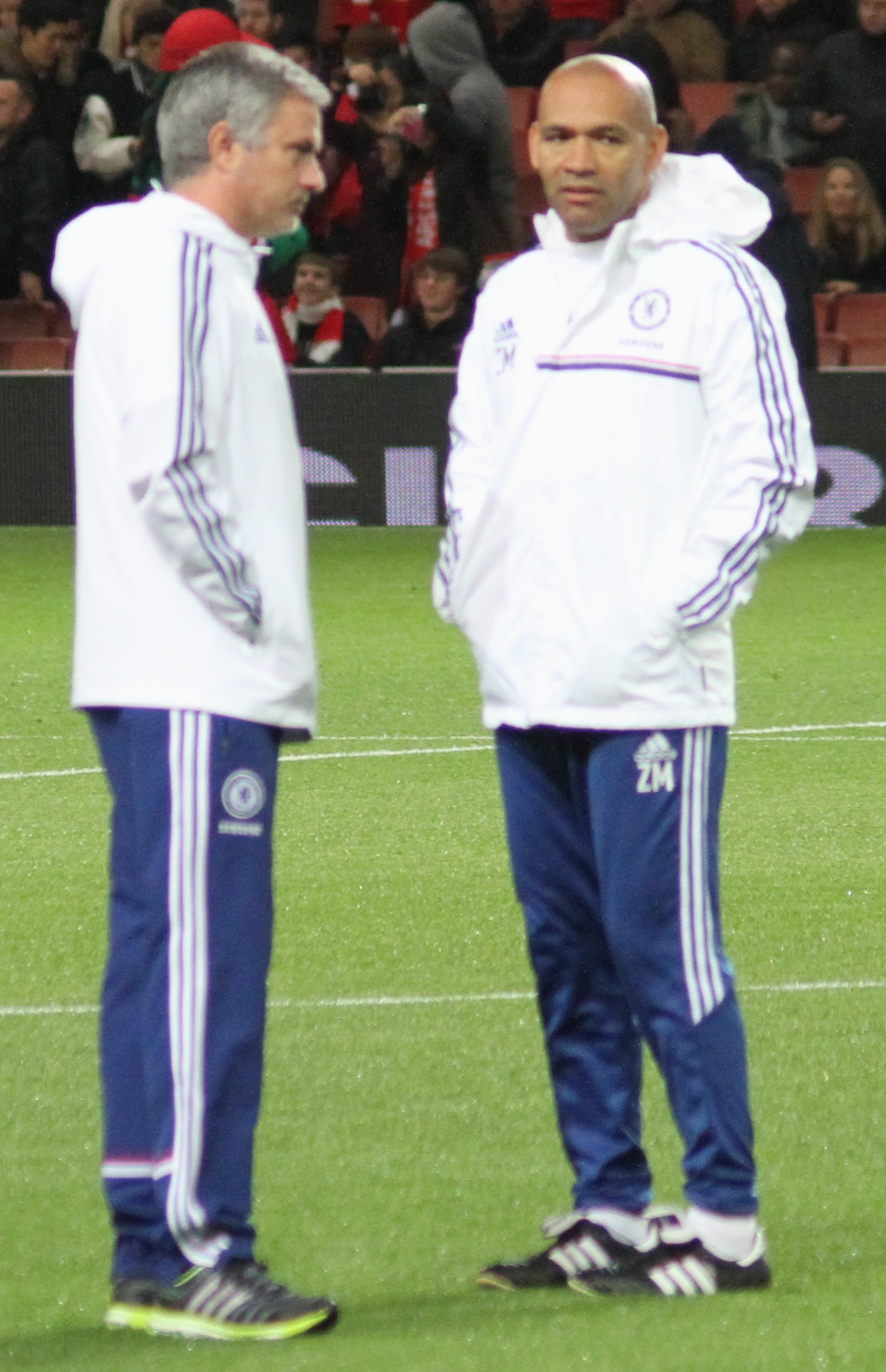
Mourinho (left) with his assistant José Morais in 2013

On 3 June 2013, Chelsea appointed Mourinho as manager for the second time, on a four-year contract. Mourinho told Chelsea TV, "In my career I've had two great passions – Inter and Chelsea – and Chelsea is more than important for me." "It was very, very hard to play against Chelsea, and I did it only twice which was not so bad." "Now I promise exactly the same things I promised in 2004 with this difference to add: I'm one of you." On 10 June, Mourinho was officially confirmed as Chelsea manager for the second time at a press conference held at Stamford Bridge.

==== 2013–15: Return and Third Premier League title ====
Mourinho's first competitive game back in charge of Chelsea ended in a 2–0 home victory against Hull City on 18 August 2013. On 30 August Mourinho faced defending UEFA Champions League winners Bayern Munich in the UEFA Super Cup, which was his second as a manager. Despite taking the lead Chelsea lost to Bayern on penalties as Romelu Lukaku saw his decisive penalty getting saved by Bayern keeper Manuel Neuer. Following the loss to Pep Guardiola's Bayern Munich he said, "They take the cup and the best team lost. Even with ten men we played fantastically. Pride is OK but we lost."

On 29 January 2014, following a 0–0 draw at home to West Ham United, Mourinho described the Hammers as playing "19th century football", saying, "This is not the best league in the world, this is football from the 19th century", and, "The only [other] thing I could bring was a Black and Decker to destroy the wall." In March, recognizing his contributions to the club, Mourinho was given share number 1 by the Chelsea Pitch Owners Association which owns the Stamford Bridge freehold. On 19 April, Mourinho suffered his first ever home league defeat as Chelsea manager in a 2–1 loss to Sunderland at Stamford Bridge. He consistently played down Chelsea's title chances throughout the season and referred to it as a transitional season, slowly moulding his squad and most significantly dropping (and eventually selling) Chelsea's player of the year of the two previous seasons, Juan Mata. Chelsea went on to finish third in the 2013–14 Premier League, four points behind champions Manchester City, and was eliminated in the semi-finals of the 2013–14 Champions League by Atlético Madrid.

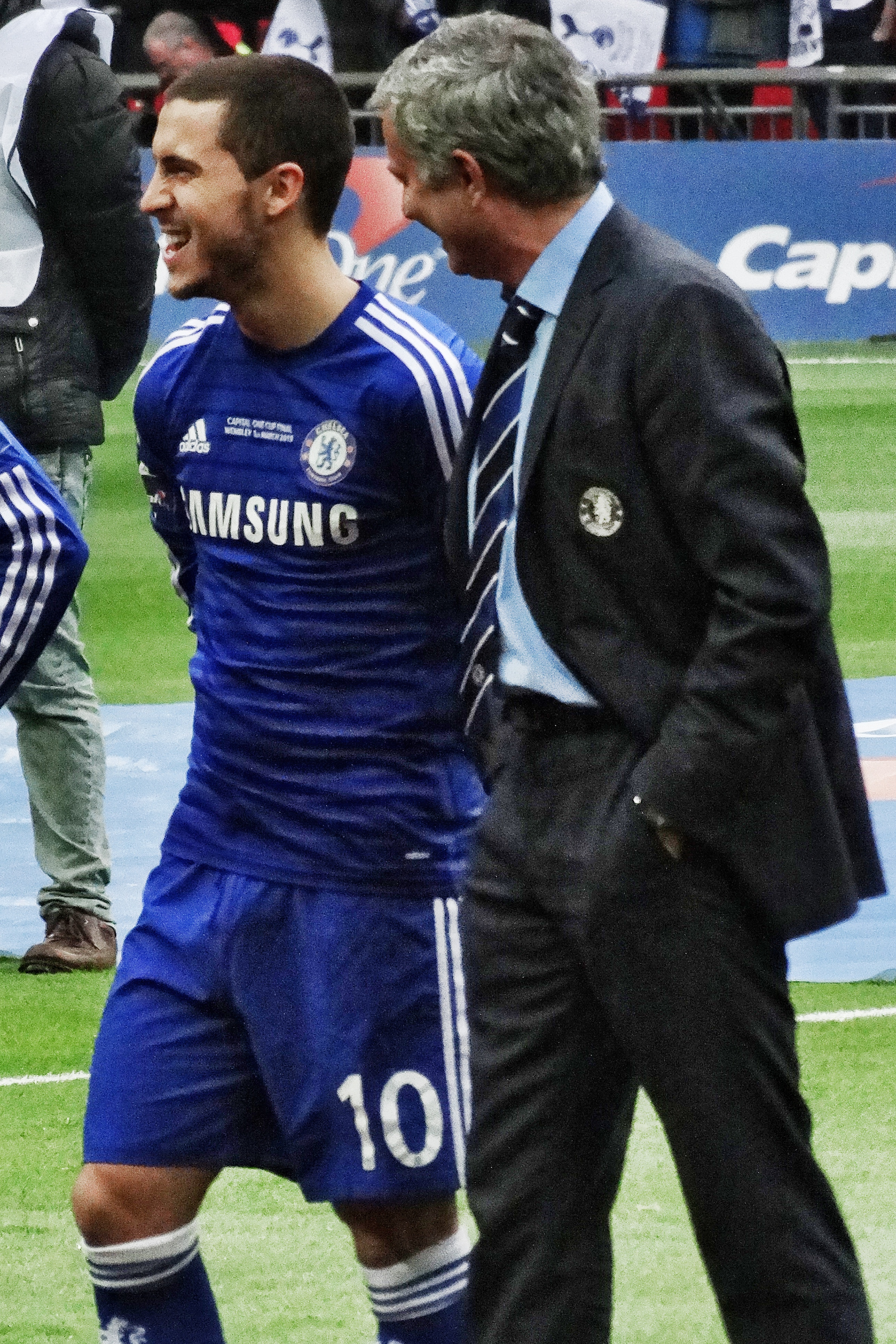
Mourinho with Chelsea playmaker Eden Hazard in 2015. Their relationship soured in the following season.

Chelsea started their 2014–15 Premier League campaign with a 3–1 victory against Burnley on 18 August at Turf Moor. This match marked the first competitive action for new signings Diego Costa, Cesc Fàbregas and Thibaut Courtois, the latter starting in goal after a three-year loan spell at Atlético Madrid. Didier Drogba also made his return appearance to the Chelsea squad, coming off the bench in the second half.

On 24 January 2015, Chelsea were knocked out of the fourth round of the FA Cup with a surprise 2–4 defeat to League One side Bradford City, ending their hopes of a potential quadruple. Mourinho described the defeat as a "disgrace". On 1 March, Chelsea defeated Tottenham Hotspur 2–0 in the League Cup final to claim their first trophy of the season, and Mourinho's first trophy since returning to Chelsea. On 11 March, Chelsea were knocked out of the UEFA Champions League round of 16 after losing to Paris Saint-Germain on away goals. On 3 May, Chelsea were crowned Premier League champions after beating Crystal Palace with three games to spare. Mourinho was subsequently named as Premier League Manager of the Season, with Chelsea losing just three matches all season.

==== 2015–16: Second departure ====
On 7 August 2015, Mourinho signed a new four-year contract with Chelsea that would have kept him at Stamford Bridge until 2019. On 29 August, Mourinho reached his 100th Premier League home match at Chelsea, which ended in a 2–1 loss to Crystal Palace. Chelsea started the season by picking up just eleven points in their first twelve games in the Premier League. They also went out of the League Cup to Stoke City on penalties on 27 October.

On 17 December, after losing nine of 16 Premier League matches, Chelsea announced that they had parted company with Mourinho "by mutual consent". The club went on to state: "The club wishes to make clear Jose leaves us on good terms and will always remain a much-loved, respected and significant figure at Chelsea."

=== Manchester United ===
==== 2016–17: Europa League title and double ====
On 27 May 2016, Mourinho signed a three-year contract with Manchester United, with an option to stay at the club until at least 2020. On 7 August, Mourinho won his first trophy, the FA Community Shield, beating reigning Premier League champions Leicester City 2–1. Mourinho was victorious in his first Premier League game as United boss, winning 3–1 away to AFC Bournemouth on 14 August.

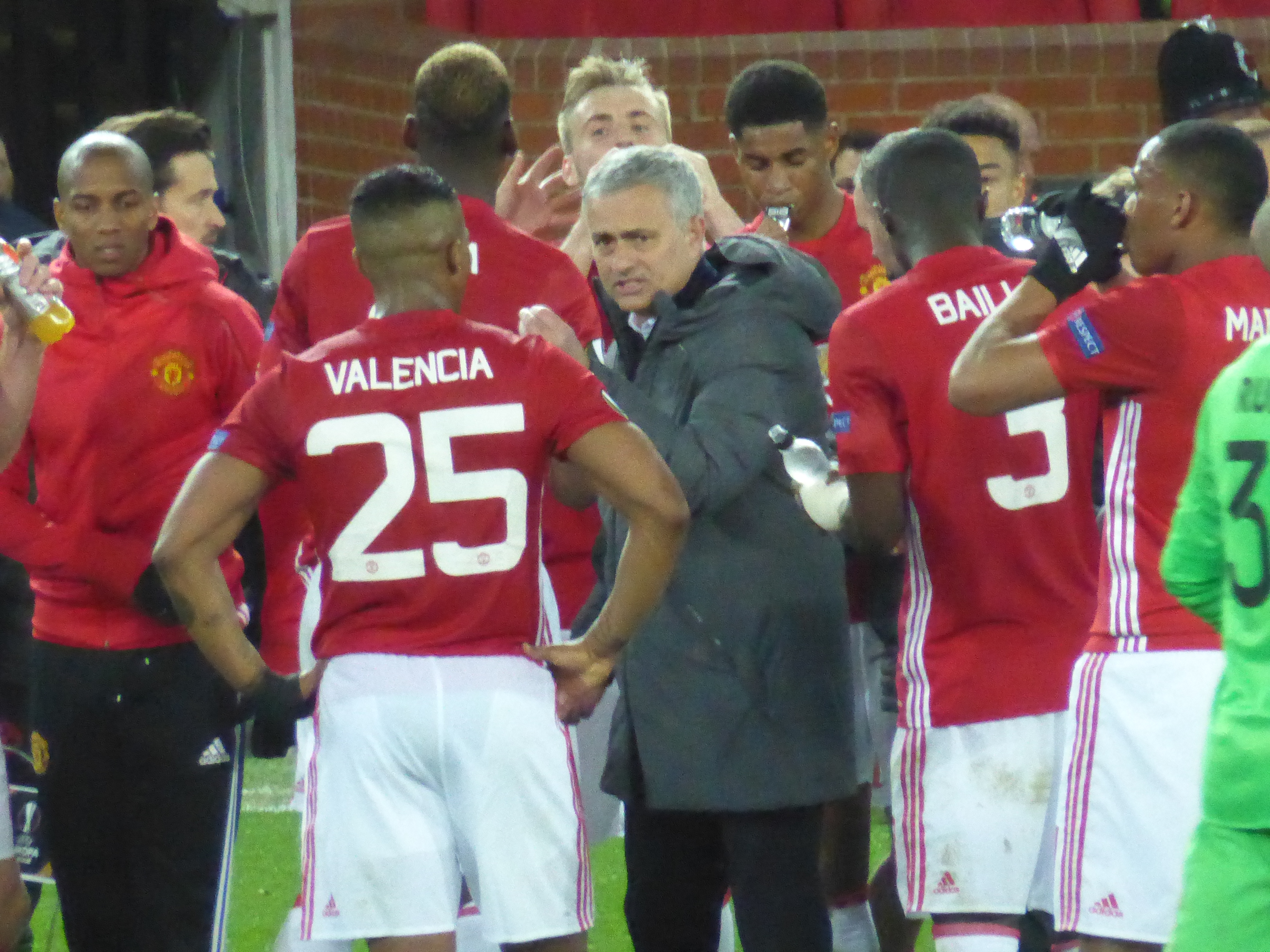
Mourinho speaking to his players during a Europa League game against Anderlecht at Old Trafford in 2017

On 11 September, Mourinho lost his first Manchester derby as a manager in a 2–1 defeat to Manchester City; this was also his eighth loss against his longtime rival manager, former Barça and Bayern Munich manager Pep Guardiola. On 23 October, Mourinho made his first visit back to Chelsea with Manchester United since leaving in December 2015. The match ended in a 4–0 defeat which left them six points off the top of the table. Mourinho won his second Manchester derby as a manager on 26 October with a 1–0 victory at Old Trafford in the EFL Cup. Juan Mata scored the only goal of the game in the 54th minute, with the victory being Mourinho's fourth against Guardiola (four wins, six draws, eight losses).

Following the charges made by the FA over Mourinho's comments about referee Anthony Taylor, Mourinho once again got into trouble with a referee on 29 October when he was sent to the stands by Mark Clattenburg during the 0–0 home draw against Burnley. On 29 January 2017, despite a 2–1 second leg loss away to Hull City, Mourinho's United reached the final of the EFL Cup by virtue of a 3–2 aggregate win. Manchester United won 3–2 over Southampton in the EFL Cup Final at Wembley. With the victory, he became the first United manager to win a major trophy in his debut season.

On 24 May, Manchester United won the Europa League courtesy of a 2–0 win over Ajax. This was Mourinho's second major trophy of his first season as Manchester United manager. It also maintained his 100% record of winning every major European Cup final as a manager.

==== 2017–18: Premier League and FA Cup runner-up ====
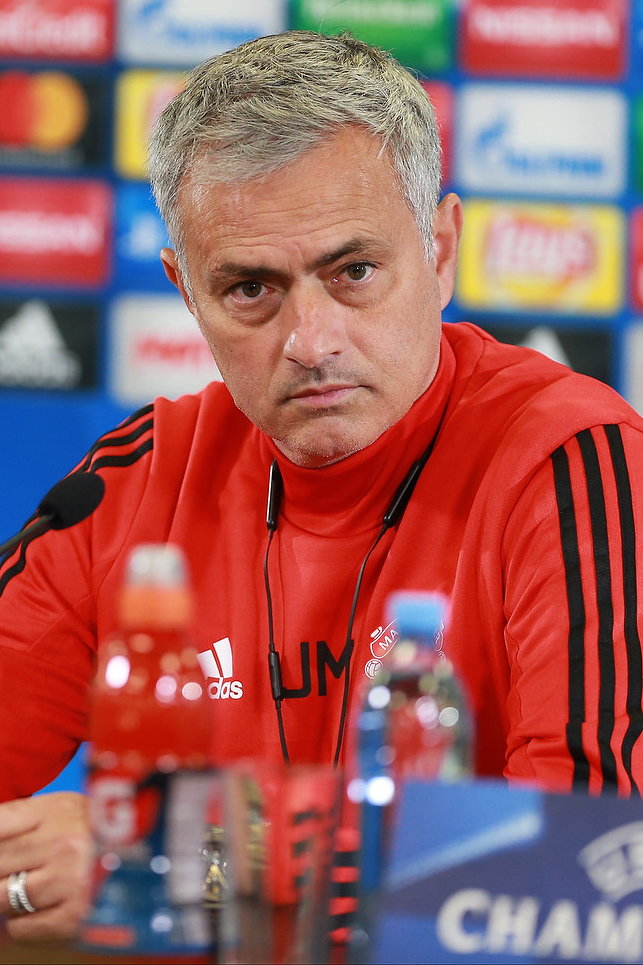
Mourinho during a UEFA Champions League pre-match press conference with United in 2017

Mourinho strengthened his side further in the summer of 2017, with the signings of Belgian striker Romelu Lukaku, defender Victor Lindelöf and midfielder Nemanja Matić. United made a strong start to the season before a difficult winter schedule widened the gap between them and city rivals Manchester City.

Mourinho was criticised for Manchester United's Champions League exit to Sevilla at the last-sixteen stage, which resulted in a surprise twelve minute rant from Mourinho defending his United career. Manchester United finished second in the table – the club's best result since the departure of Alex Ferguson five years prior – after a 1–0 home defeat to West Bromwich Albion, finishing nineteen points behind Manchester City. United also lost the 2018 FA Cup Final to Mourinho's former club Chelsea after an Eden Hazard penalty sealed a 1–0 win for the Blues.

==== 2018–19: Final season in Manchester ====
After a poor start to the 2018–19 season which saw Manchester United lose two of their opening three league games for the first time in 26 years, including a 3–0 home loss to Tottenham Hotspur – the heaviest home defeat of his career – an animated Mourinho demanded "respect" from critical journalists and held up three fingers (one for each Premier League trophy he had won as coach), adding: "I won more Premier Leagues alone than the other 19 managers [in the league] together." At his next press conference four days later, he said: "I am the manager of the one of the greatest clubs in the world but I'm also one of the greatest managers in the world."

"Of course. Did you never spend time reading the philosopher Hegel? He said: 'The truth is in the whole. It's always in the whole that you find the truth."

— Mourinho's response to being asked if he would still be a great coach if he did not win the Premier League title with Manchester United.

At the end of a Manchester United league game at Mourinho's former club Chelsea on 20 October 2018, Mourinho was involved in a tunnel incident. With Chelsea's Ross Barkley scoring a 96th-minute equaliser, a Chelsea coach, Marco Ianni, celebrated the goal by running across the United bench and clenching his fists close to Mourinho's face. An incensed Mourinho leapt up and attempted to chase Ianni down the tunnel, with security intervening. As he sat back down, some Chelsea fans repeatedly (and loudly) started chanting against Mourinho. At full-time, Mourinho walked over to United fans and applauded, and on his way back to the tunnel he held up three fingers towards Chelsea fans, reminding them he won three Premier League titles for the club.

After starting the 2018–19 season with just seven wins in the first 17 Premier League games, leaving Manchester United 19 points behind the league leaders, Mourinho was sacked by the club on 18 December 2018.

=== Tottenham Hotspur ===
On 20 November 2019, Mourinho was appointed as the manager of Tottenham Hotspur on a four-year contract, replacing the sacked Mauricio Pochettino.

==== 2019–20: First season with Tottenham ====
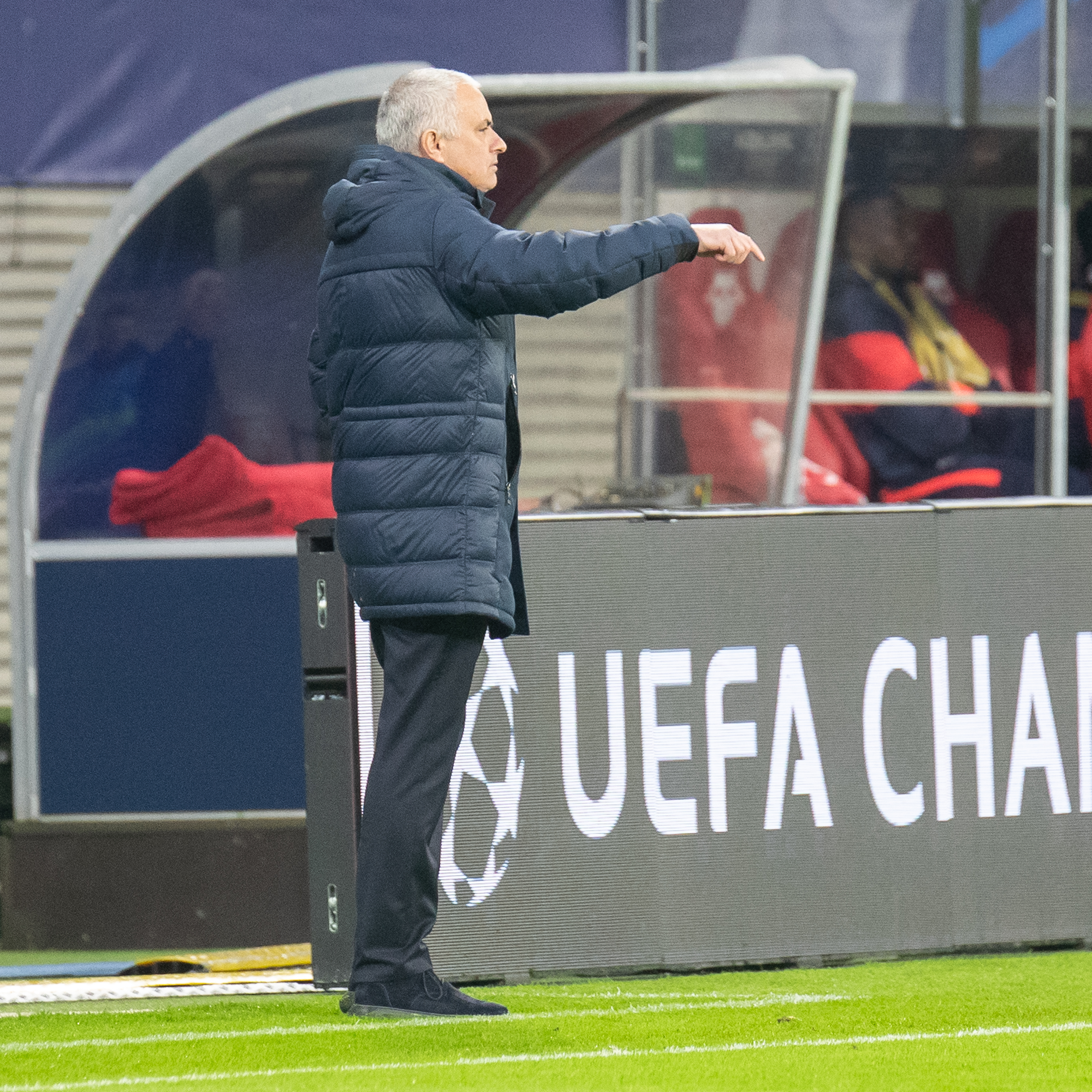
Mourinho managing Tottenham Hotspur in a Champions League game against RB Leipzig in 2020

On 23 November 2019, Mourinho managed his first match with Tottenham in a 3–2 away win against West Ham United. He later sparked media attention on 26 November, when he claimed that ball boy Callum Hynes 'assisted' Spurs' second goal in a 4–2 win over Olympiacos in the Champions League. In the Champions League round of 16, Tottenham lost both matches to be defeated 0–4 on aggregate against RB Leipzig.

Mourinho recorded his 300th win in English football when Tottenham beat West Ham United 2–0 on 23 June 2020. He secured his first ever win as a manager at St James' Park on 15 July when Tottenham defeated Newcastle by a scoreline of 3–1. Mourinho finished his first season with Tottenham Hotspur at sixth position in the Premier League.

==== 2020–21: Cup final and dismissal ====
On 4 October 2020, Mourinho managed Tottenham Hotspur to a 6–1 win against his former club Manchester United at Old Trafford. A 2–0 victory over Arsenal on 6 December put Tottenham on top of the Premier League and meant Mourinho was only the club's second manager to win his first two North London derbies. A last-minute 2–1 defeat to Liverpool at Anfield saw them drop to second place, three points off the top.

On 10 February 2021, Tottenham were knocked out of the FA Cup, losing 5–4 after extra time to Everton in the quarter-finals; this was the first time since 2010 that a José Mourinho-led team had conceded five goals in a match. On 23 February, Tottenham lost 1–0 to Chelsea, marking the first time in his career that Mourinho had lost two consecutive home games. On 18 March, Tottenham lost 3–0 to Dinamo Zagreb after extra time in the second leg of the 2020–21 UEFA Europa League round of 16, being eliminated from the competition 3–2 on aggregate.

On 19 April, Mourinho was sacked by Tottenham after 17 months in charge of the club, days before the EFL Cup Final against Manchester City. This marked the first time Mourinho had departed a club without winning a trophy since 2002. He was replaced by former Tottenham player Ryan Mason as interim manager.

=== Roma ===
"Some time ago you just had the fitness coach. Now you have the performance coach, the recovery coach, the individual coach, and you have the prevention coach. It is crazy. It has brought our work to an incredible dimension. You have to deal with so many people with so different characters and egos now. You also need to cope with much more information than before. Sometimes I have to select the most important information because we simply can't deal with everything."

— Mourinho, reflecting on two decades of managing football clubs and its changing landscape.

On 4 May 2021, Mourinho was appointed head coach of Roma from the start of the 2021–22 season, replacing compatriot Paulo Fonseca.

==== 2021–22: Ending Roma's trophy drought and UEFA Treble ====
In his first transfer window at Roma, Mourinho brought in significant summer signings. His first move was the permanent signing of Atalanta defender Roger Ibañez for a fee of €8m on 1 July. Mourinho identified areas in which the team required improvement, leading Roma to sign Portuguese goalkeeper Rui Patrício (€11.5 million), Uruguayan defender Matías Viña (€13 million) and strikers: Uzbek Eldor Shomurodov (€17.5 million) and English Tammy Abraham (€40 million). To offset this spending, and adhere to UEFA Financial Fair Play Regulations, Mourinho sanctioned the departure of several players, including Juan Jesus, Edin Džeko, Pedro, and Javier Pastore, while incorporating academy players into the first team such as Pietro Boer, Edoardo Bove and Nicola Zalewski, with the latter replacing Leonardo Spinazzola, after he ruptured his Achilles tendon during UEFA Euro 2020.

On 19 August 2021, Mourinho managed his first match with Roma in a 2–1 away win against Trabzonspor in the first leg of the UEFA Europa Conference League play-off round. Three days later, he made his return to Serie A, after eleven years, managing a 3–1 home victory over Fiorentina at Stadio Olimpico. On 26 August, Mourinho secured qualification for the Europa Conference League, after overseeing a 3–0 win against Trabzonspor in the play-off second leg. Mourinho reached 1,000 games as a manager in a 2–1 win against Sassuolo on 12 September. On 21 October, in a Conference League game against Bodø/Glimt, Roma suffered a humiliating 1–6 defeat, marking the first time a Mourinho side conceded 6 goals; Mourinho blamed the defeat on 'not having a very good squad'. Ten days later against Milan, Mourinho suffered his first home defeat in an Italian league game; before this, he was unbeaten in 43 consecutive matches.

On 4 December, against Inter, Roma was defeated 3–0, marking the first time one of his teams was 3–0 down at half-time; he said after the match that Inter 'are stronger than Roma in normal conditions; in non-normal conditions, they are much stronger'. To reinforce the team for the second part of the season, in the winter transfer window, Roma signed Ainsley Maitland-Niles and Sérgio Oliveira, on loan from Arsenal and Porto, respectively. On 20 March 2022, Mourinho won his first Derby della Capitale after managing a 3–0 win over Lazio.

On 5 May, Mourinho guided Roma to their first European final since 1991 by beating Leicester City 2–1 on aggregate in the semi-finals of the Europa Conference League, making him the first manager to reach the final of all three current major European competitions, and the first to reach a major European final with four clubs. On 24 May, Mourinho won his first title with Roma by defeating Feyenoord in the 2022 UEFA Europa Conference League Final. This was Roma's first trophy in 11 years, making him the third manager – after Udo Lattek and Giovanni Trapattoni – to have won all three existing major European trophies, and the first to achieve the UEFA treble by winning the Champions League, UEFA Cup/Europa League, and Europa Conference League (in place of the defunct UEFA Cup Winners' Cup). It was the first time a Serie A team won a continental championship since Inter's 2009–10 UEFA Champions League, also achieved under Mourinho.

==== 2022–23: Back-to-back European finals ====
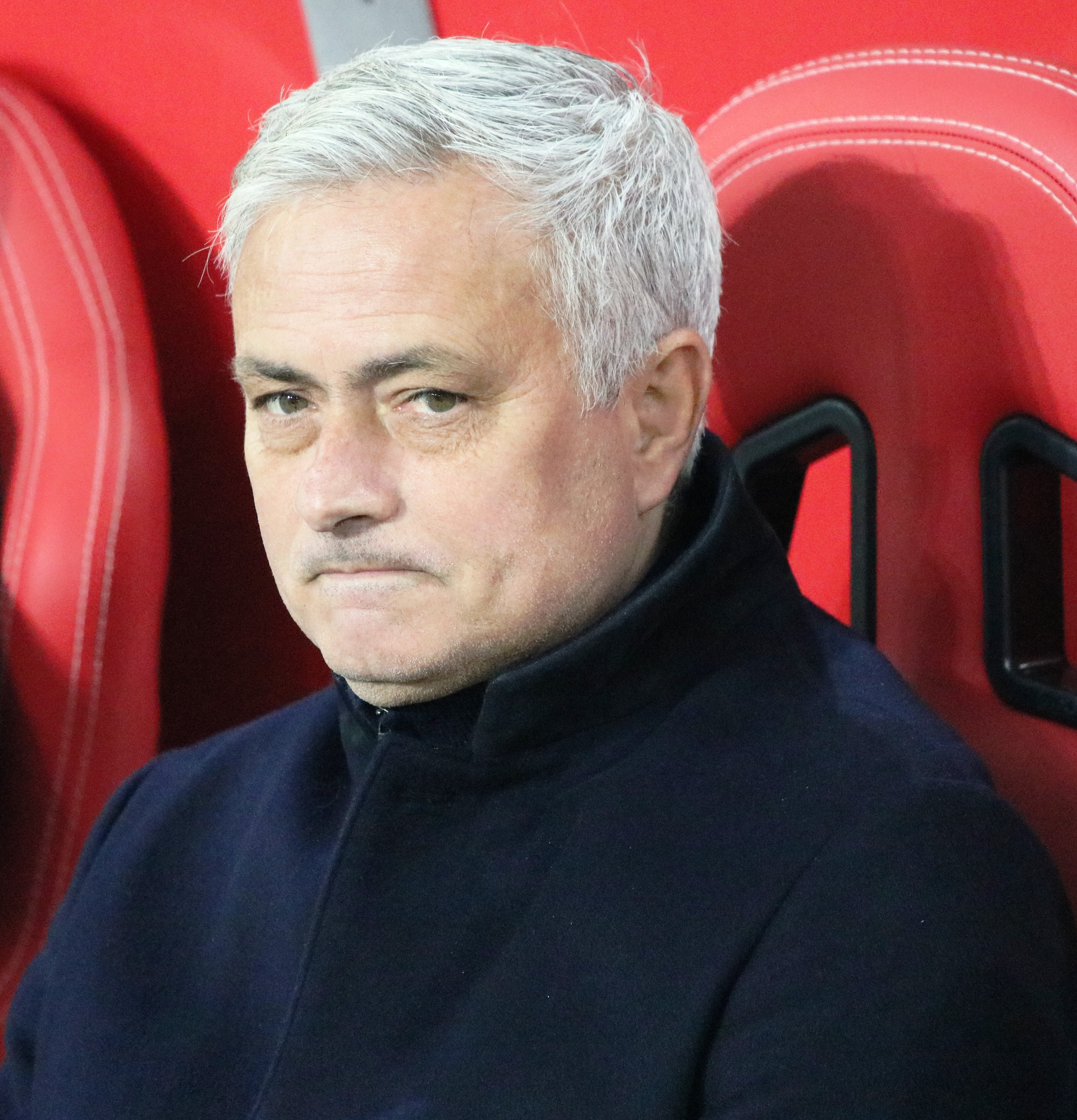
Mourinho with Roma in 2023

In his second transfer window at Roma to prepare for the 2022–23 season, due to UEFA Financial Fair Play Regulations regulations, the club only spent €7 million with incoming players being signed as free transfers and loans, including Turkish defender Zeki Çelik, the Serbians Nemanja Matić and Mile Svilar, and Italian striker Andrea Belotti on free transfers, and Dutch midfielder Georginio Wijnaldum on loan from Paris Saint-Germain. The most notable signing was Argentine forward Paulo Dybala on a free transfer after his contract with Juventus expired.

The club began their league season with a 1–0 away win over Salernitana on 14 August 2022. Roma embarked on a four-game unbeaten streak, before losing 4–0 against Udinese, on 4 September, marking Mourinho's largest defeat in his Serie A career and the third time he had lost with a margin of four or more goals in a top-flight league match. He said he "preferred losing one match 4–0 than four matches 1–0". On 1 October, Roma recorded their first win against Inter since February 2017.

Prior to deadline day, following Wijnaldum's injury and the departures of Matías Viña and Nicolò Zaniolo, with the latter falling out with the club's hierarchy, Roma entered the winter transfer market to sign Norwegian forward Ola Solbakken on a free transfer, Guinean midfielder Mady Camara on loan from Olympiacos and Spanish defender Diego Llorente on loan from Leeds United. On 1 February 2023, Roma were knocked out of the Coppa Italia, losing 2–1 at home to Cremonese. On 28 February, Roma was beaten again by Cremonese, the latter's first win in Serie A in 27 years. After drawing with Juventus earlier in the season, a 1–0 win over them at Stadio Olimpico on 5 March meant for the first time that Roma stayed unbeaten against Juventus in a Serie A season since 2003–04.

Despite a challenging season due to inconsistencies and injuries to key players, on 18 May Mourinho guided Roma to their second consecutive European final, beating former Real Madrid player Xabi Alonso's Bayer Leverkusen 1–0 in the semi-finals of the Europa League, repeating the same feat during his time at Porto of reaching back-to-back European finals in 2003 and 2004. Following a 2–2 home draw to Salernitana in Serie A, Mourinho admitted that "Champions League qualification would be more than a miracle" for Roma, after disagreeing with Roma's sporting director Tiago Pinto comments that Champions League qualification was the main goal for Roma's season, adding that "we can write history and want to continue doing it, but qualifying for the Champions League when spending €7 million on the transfer market is more than history, more than a miracle. It's Jesus Christ coming to Rome and having a walk around the Vatican."

The relationship between Mourinho and Roma directors became strained as they had different views on the club's future, with Mourinho frustrated with lack of finances, due to the Financial Fair Play restrictions, leading to disagreements over transfers. He wanted reassurances from the Roma owners before committing his future to the club, amid reports that he was in negotiations to become Paris Saint-Germain's manager.

In the Europa League final on 31 May, Mourinho managed his sixth European final, as Roma faced Sevilla, losing 4–2 on penalties after a 1–1 draw in extra-time. This was Mourinho's first loss in a European final. After the presentation of his runner-up medal, Mourinho gave his medal to a young Roma supporter. In the press conference afterwards, Mourinho said that "he wanted to stay" at Roma but that he "wanted conditions to give more", as he was "tired of acting as a manager, director of communications and complain about referee's decisions".

==== 2023–24: Struggles and fourth consecutive early departure ====
In his third season, due to Roma's limited transfer budget because of Financial Fair Play regulations, following the same transfer policy as the previous season, players were signed on free transfers or loans, including Argentine midfielder Leandro Paredes and Renato Sanches from Paris Saint-Germain, Houssem Aouar and Evan Ndicka on free transfers, and the loan of Romelu Lukaku from Chelsea, whom Mourinho had previously managed at Manchester.

After enduring a difficult start to the season, with the club near the relegation zone, on 17 September, Mourinho registered the biggest win in Serie A since April 1961, when Roma thrashed Empoli 7–0 at home. Following a negative string of results that left Roma in ninth place, five points behind the UEFA Champions League qualification spots, and two consecutive losses against Lazio in the 2023–24 Coppa Italia quarter-finals and AC Milan in the league, Roma announced on 16 January 2024 that they would part ways with Mourinho with immediate effect.

=== Fenerbahçe ===
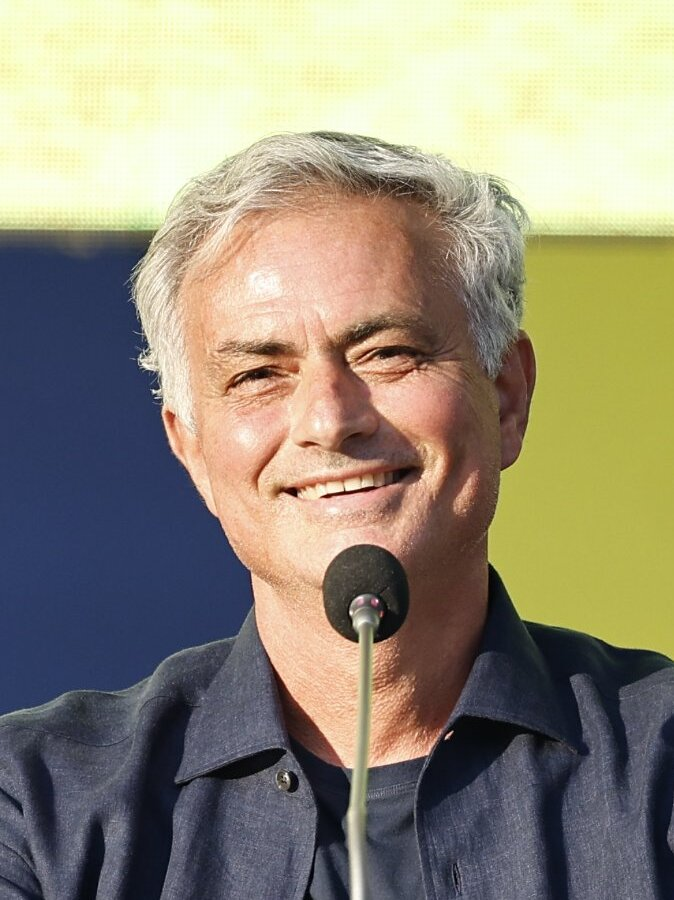
Mourinho during presentation as Fenerbahçe coach in 2024.

On 1 June 2024, Turkish side Fenerbahçe confirmed that Mourinho had officially begun negotiations with the club over their head coach role. The following day, he was officially unveiled as the club's new manager and presented to the fans during a special ceremony at the Şükrü Saracoğlu Stadium. During the team's 1–1 draw with Manchester United in the Europa League, he received a red card by protesting for a second-half penalty, which both the referee and VAR denied. The club finished second place in the Süper Lig, behind Galatasaray. In his first season, Mourinho failed to achieve a victory against the league's traditional rivals, suffering two defeats and one draw in three matches against Galatasaray, while also losing both encounters against Beşiktaş.

Before the beginning of the 2025–26 season, Mourinho expected himself to stay at Fenerbahçe for the season. However, following Fenerbahçe's loss to Benfica in the 2025–26 Champions League play-off round, he was sacked on 29 August 2025. This dismissal marked the seventh time Mourinho had been sacked by a club, rather than resigning or leaving by mutual consent.

=== Return to Benfica ===
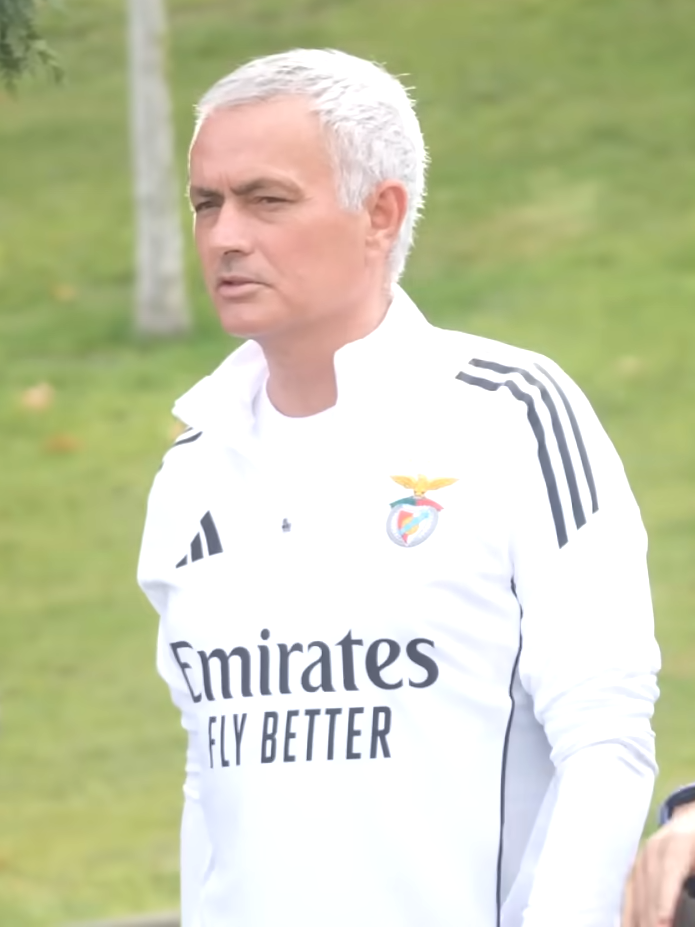
Mourinho with Benfica in 2025

On 18 September, Mourinho signed a two-year contract with Benfica, returning to the club after 25 years. Mourinho's return came with pressure, as Benfica was in a difficult moment domestically and in Europe, and he was expected to immediately stabilise the team and make them competitive again, following a shock 3–2 home defeat to Qarabağ in their opening Champions League league phase match. He managed his first win back with the club in a 3–0 away win over AVS.

Despite remaining unbeaten in the league, by January 2026, Benfica was 10 points behind league leaders Porto and exited both domestic cups. After losing to Braga 3–1 in the Taça da Liga semi-final on 8 January, he publicly criticised the players' mentality, forcing the squad to stay at the Benfica Campus afterwards. A week later, Benfica were also knocked out of the Taça de Portugal by Porto in the quarter-finals, losing 1–0 away. In the Champions League, Mourinho guided Benfica to one of their worst run's in the competition, after losing three consecutive matches to Chelsea, Newcastle United and Bayer Leverkusen, leaving them tied last place in the standings. After picking up wins against Ajax away and Napoli at home, Benfica qualified to the knockout play-offs in 24th place on goal difference, on 28 January, following a 4–2 victory in their final league-phase match, against Real Madrid, secured by a stoppage-time goal from goalkeeper Anatoliy Trubin. In the knockout phase play-offs, he faced Real Madrid once again, with Benfica being eliminated 3–1 on aggregate.

He concluded the 2025–26 season undefeated in the league, yet his club finished third and qualified for the Europa League second qualifying round. Towards the end of the campaign, Mourinho was linked to a possible return to Real Madrid for the next season, after they were going through a crisis of results. He claimed that his priority was to continue the project at Benfica rather than leave after only a short period, but the decision was going to be made by Benfica's President Rui Costa. On 9 June, Benfica announced to the Portuguese Securities Market Commission (CMVM) that Mourinho would leave the club after reaching an agreement with Real Madrid, which paid his €15 million release clause.

=== Return to Real Madrid ===
On 11 June 2026, Real Madrid announced the reappointment of Mourinho as head coach after 13 years on a three-year deal. His contract would begin on 13 July 2026, the first day of pre-season.

== Manager profile ==
=== Tactics ===
In the modern world, at least at elite level, José Mourinho stands alone. He was at the greatest coaching seminar the world has seen [at Barcelona in the mid-90s], when the game as we know it was shaped, but he did not draw the same lessons everybody else did. The other eight [future coaches who were also at the club] espoused the proactive, possession-based football seeded at the club by Vic Buckingham, developed by Rinus Michels and taken to new levels by Johan Cruyff. Mourinho, however, was different. Mourinho believed in reactive football. He was the outsider, the outcast who now revels in his role as the dark lord. Saturday's game against Manchester United was typical. Others, playing at home in a match that could effectively ensure the title, might have felt compelled to attack. Mourinho [as manager of Chelsea] fielded Kurt Zouma, a central defender, in midfield, sitting deep, and won the game with 28% possession.

— Jonathan Wilson writing for The Guardian: "José Mourinho, the anti-Barcelona, stands alone in modern football", 23 April 2015.

Mourinho has been noted for his tactical prowess, game management, and adaptability to different situations. Teams under Mourinho typically demonstrate great defensive awareness and quick transition ability through midfield, in particular down the flanks. A feature of his is playing with three or more central midfielders, as Mourinho has stressed midfield superiority as crucial in winning. As Porto manager, Mourinho employed a diamond 4–4–2 formation, with his midfield – consisting of Costinha or Pedro Mendes as defensive midfielder; Maniche and Dmitri Alenichev as wide central midfielders; and Deco on the tip – acting as a cohesive unit, providing Porto with midfield superiority while allowing the full-backs to move forward. Defensively, the team played with a high defensive line and were known for their fitness and use of heavy pressing high up the pitch.

During his first two years at Chelsea, Mourinho employed a fluid 4–3–3 formation, having Claude Makélélé play as deep-lying midfielder. This gave Chelsea a three-against-two midfield advantage over most English teams playing 4–4–2, and helped Chelsea win Premier League titles. Mourinho explained:

Look, if I have a triangle in midfield – Claude Makélélé behind and two others just in front – I will always have an advantage against a pure 4–4–2 where the central midfielders are side by side. That's because I will always have an extra man. It starts with Makelele, who is between the lines. If nobody comes to him he can see the whole pitch and has time. If he gets closed down it means one of the two other central midfielders is open. If they are closed down and the other team's wingers come inside to help, it means there is space now for us on the flank, either for our own wingers or for our full-backs. There is nothing a pure 4–4–2 can do to stop things.

Andrei Shevchenko's signing forced Mourinho to switch to a 4–1–3–2 for 2006–07. At Inter, he won his first Serie A title alternating between a 4–3–3 and diamond, and in his second season, the signings of Samuel Eto'o, Diego Milito, Wesley Sneijder and Goran Pandev, along with Motta, enabled him to play 4–2–3–1, after using a 4–3–1–2 formation with little success in Europe, despite being effective domestically. In this formation, striker Eto'o was used out of position as a left-winger, and the 4–2–3–1 effectively became a pure 4–5–1 without the ball; the switch proved to be effective as Inter won the treble.

As Real Madrid manager from 2010 to 2013, Mourinho utilised an even more flexible 4–2–3–1 formation, with Xabi Alonso and Sami Khedira as holding midfielders, Mesut Özil as attacking midfielder, and Cristiano Ronaldo and Ángel Di María flanking Karim Benzema as the lone striker. This allowed for rapid counterattacks, with the four attackers able to play any of the four offensive positions. Consequently, Benzema would often drop deep to act as a false 9, creating space for Ronaldo to make runs into the centre from the left and get on the end of passes. In the 2011–12 season, Madrid won La Liga nine points clear of second-place Barcelona, breaking many records, including points collected (100) and goals scored (121). In Mourinho's three seasons at Madrid, the team consistently reached the semi-finals of the Champions League. The counter-attacking system pioneered by Mourinho continued to be used by his successors Carlo Ancelotti and Zinedine Zidane.

Mourinho is praised for his quick reactions to a game's events. In a 2012–13 Champions League round of 16 encounter with Manchester United, and with Real Madrid losing 1–0 and facing elimination, United's Nani was sent off. Mourinho quickly introduced Luka Modrić and moved Sami Khedira to the right, where United had a numerical disadvantage due to Nani's dismissal. This forced United manager Ferguson to move Danny Welbeck from the midfield to that flank, thus freeing Xabi Alonso, and two quick goals turned the game in Madrid's favour. In the second leg of the 2009–10 Champions League semi-final against Barcelona, Motta's sending off led Mourinho to sit deep and narrow to defend their lead from the first leg away from home, while Barcelona were allowed possession. Mourinho used his left winger Eto'o as a makeshift left-sided attacking wing-back. Although Inter lost the second leg 1–0, they advanced to the final 3–2 on aggregate; Mourinho described the match as "the most beautiful defeat of [his] life."

Mourinho is renowned for being well-informed about his opponent and tactically outwitting other managers. In a 2004 Champions League knockout game between Porto and Manchester United, Mourinho had already asserted that United's weakness was on the flanks, especially on the left where Quinton Fortune was protected by Ryan Giggs. The central pairing of Maniche and Deco targeted that flank with their threaded passes, and Dmitri Alenichev wreaked havoc. He set up Benni McCarthy's equaliser in the first half, then with United focussed on defending the left, Porto switched to the other side, where McCarthy was able to beat Gary Neville and Wes Brown to score the winner.

Mourinho is acknowledged for his attention to detail, organisational planning and in-game communication. In a 2013–14 Champions League knockout game against Paris Saint-Germain, when Chelsea needed one goal within 10 minutes to progress, he played a risky 4–1–2–3 in the last quarter, which led to Demba Ba's winning goal. Afterwards Mourinho said his team had worked on three alternative formations in training:

We trained yesterday with the three different systems we used, the one we started with, the one without [Frank] Lampard and finally the one with Demba and Fernando [Torres] in, and the players knew what to do.

When Ba hit the winner, Mourinho darted down the touchline "in celebration", but afterwards he said he was running to tell Torres and Ba their positional instructions for the remaining six minutes.

In April 2017, Mourinho's Manchester United beat league leaders Chelsea 2–0. Mourinho instructed Ander Herrera to man-mark Eden Hazard. This tactic proved effective as Hazard, and Chelsea, were nullified for large portions. An untested strike partnership of Marcus Rashford and Jesse Lingard caused the Chelsea defence problems, with the former opening the scoring in the 7th minute. Mourinho's tactical organisation throughout the match drew praise.

=== Reception ===
"Everyone says we parked the bus in front of the goal. We didn't park the bus, we parked the plane and we did it for two reasons. One, because we only had 10 men and two, because we beat them 3–1 at San Siro, not by parking the bus, or the boat or the airplane but by smashing them."

— Mourinho responding to critics accusing him of playing defensive football in the second leg of the 2010 Champions League semi-final against Guardiola's Barcelona.

Since the self proclamation in 2004, Mourinho is often nicknamed "The Special One". He is widely regarded by several players and coaches to be one of the best managers of his generation and one of the greatest ever managers. In 2010, Pep Guardiola described Mourinho as "probably the best coach in the world". Pundit Nicky Bandini praised Mourinho for his ability to motivate his players and a create a united team environment during Inter's 2009–10 treble winning season, noting that throughout the course of the season playmaker Sneijder went as far to say that he would "kill and die" for Mourinho, views which were later also echoed by the club's former striker Ibrahimović, who had worked under Mourinho the previous season, while Dejan Stanković instead said that he "would have thrown [himself] into a fire" for his manager. Eto'o also praised Mourinho for his player management skills during their time at the club together, describing him as a "unique" head coach, who "...perfectly understood every player and the sentiments of the Inter fans. He knew how to combine these two things, he was perfect." Chelsea midfielder Frank Lampard has stated that Mourinho is the best manager he has ever worked for.

A plethora of Mourinho's tactical decisions have been met with criticism. Throughout his career, he has sometimes been accused of playing defensive, dull football to grind out results. In 2011, Morten Olsen concluded that he doesn't "like his persona or the way he plays football negatively". Additionally, Johan Cruyff stated that same year, "Mourinho is a negative coach. He only cares about the result and doesn't care much for good football." Mourinho, along with his compatriot Cristiano Ronaldo, is credited with inspiring changing fortunes of Portuguese football in the 2010s and 2020s.

== Media attention and controversies ==
=== Chelsea ===
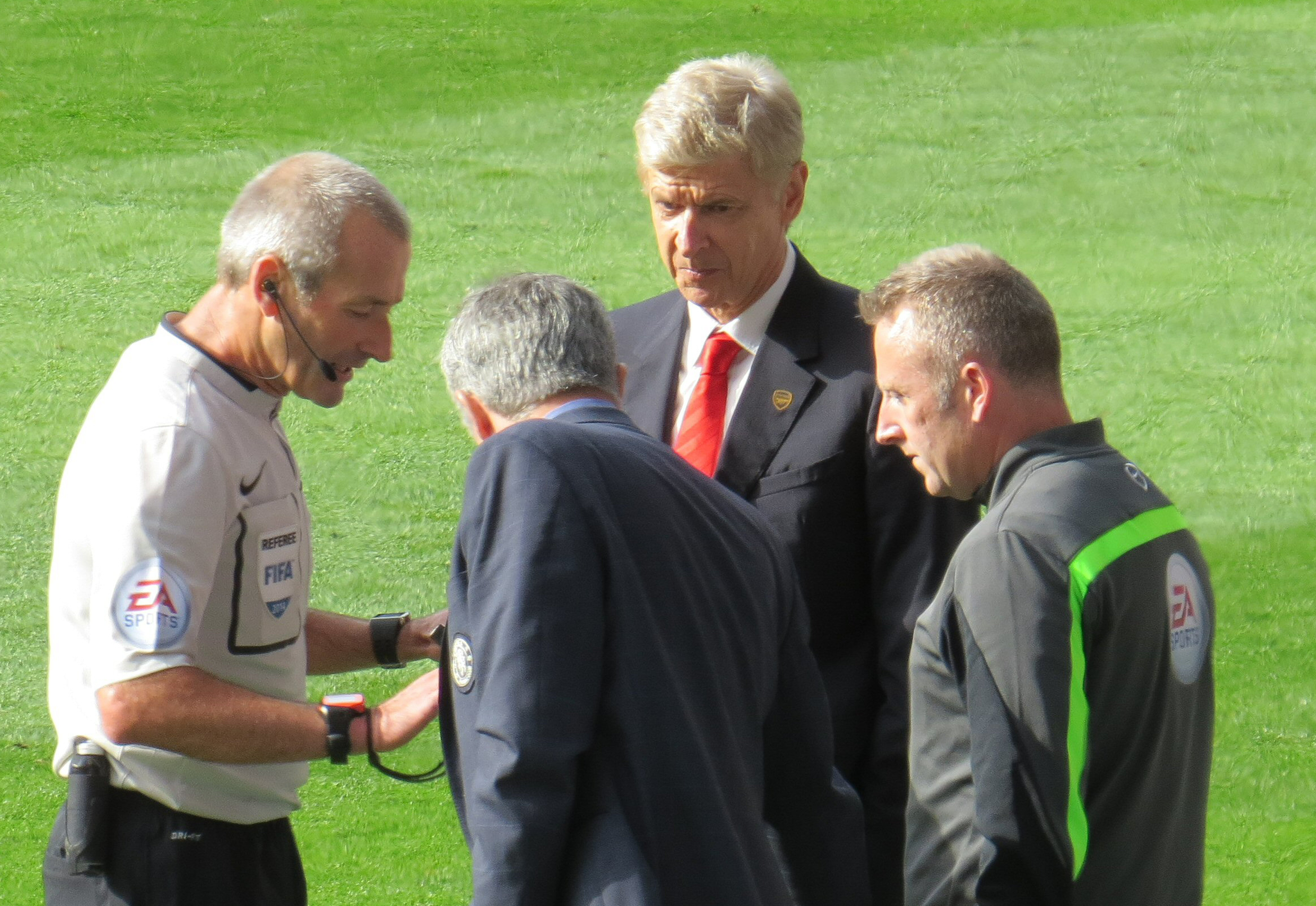
Arsène Wenger (red tie) and Mourinho (middle). Wenger was among the coaches with whom Mourinho has had confrontations.

Following a Champions League tie between Chelsea and Barcelona in March 2005, Mourinho accused referee Anders Frisk and Barcelona coach Frank Rijkaard of breaking FIFA rules by having a meeting at half-time. Mourinho said that this biased the referee and caused him to send off Chelsea striker Didier Drogba in the second half. Frisk stated that Rijkaard had tried to speak to him but said that he had sent him away. The situation intensified when Frisk began to receive death threats from angered fans, causing the referee to retire prematurely. UEFA referees chief Volker Roth labelled Mourinho an "enemy of football", although UEFA distanced themselves from the comment. After an investigation of the incident, Mourinho was given a two-match touchline ban for his behaviour and both Chelsea and the manager were fined by UEFA, though the body confirmed that it did not hold Mourinho personally responsible for Frisk's retirement.

On 2 June 2005, Mourinho was fined £200,000 for his part in the meeting with then Arsenal full-back Ashley Cole in January of that year. The pair had met to discuss transfer terms while Cole was still under contract to Arsenal, which was in breach of the Premier League rules. His fine was later reduced to £75,000 after a hearing in August. Later that year, he labelled Arsenal manager Arsène Wenger "a voyeur" after being irked at what he saw as the latter's apparent obsession with Chelsea. Wenger was furious with the remark and considered taking legal action against Mourinho. The animosity died down, and the two managers made peace after Mourinho admitted that he regretted making the comment. In February 2014, Mourinho referred to Wenger as a "specialist in failure".

=== Inter Milan ===
==== Presentation ====
On 3 June 2008, during the press conference introducing him as new Inter manager, Mourinho spoke almost in Italian. When asked about how he would see players like Frank Lampard or Michael Essien in Italian Serie A, Mourinho realised that this was a way of making him speak about Chelsea players, something he had refused to do in previous questions. Consequently, he replied "Ma io non sono pirla!" (Milanse Italian for "I'm not stupid!").

==== Lo Monaco comments ====
After Inter defeated Catania 2–1 on 13 September 2008, the opponents' CEO Pietro Lo Monaco resented the fact that Mourinho had underlined Inter's superiority in the match, especially by saying that he could have played in goal for Inter. Lo Monaco stated: "Mourinho andrebbe preso a bastonate sui denti" (Italian for "Mourinho should be beaten on his teeth"). Lo Monaco later clarified that he did not mean to encourage violence, but that it was just a way of saying that Mourinho should shut up. When asked about Lo Monaco's statements, Mourinho replied that he did not know him, saying that he only knew other Monacos such as the principality, or Bayern Munich, known in Italy as Bayern Monaco.

==== Comparison with Mancini ====
On 9 November 2008, after Inter defeated Udinese 1–0 via a late Julio Ricardo Cruz goal, Mourinho had a discussion with the journalist Mario Sconcerti. As the Portuguese manager had underlined on the day before that he was collecting more points during his first Serie A campaign with Inter compared to Roberto Mancini's first season, basically with the aim of defending his work, which media considered below expectations, Sconcerti invited Mourinho to avoid comparisons with the Italian manager, who could not respond directly. An annoyed Mourinho replied to Sconcerti asking for honest comparisons and emphasising once again that he was doing better than Mancini.

==== Wild celebration against Siena ====
On 20 December 2008, after Maicon scored the late winning goal in a difficult away match against Siena, which ended 2–1, Mourinho wildly ran in front of the tiers reserved to Inter supporters to celebrate, hugging the Brazilian himself. In the post-match interview, the journalist Maurizio Pistocchi showed his surprise for Mourinho's behaviour, which he considered exaggerated and possibly a lack of respect to Siena supporters. The Portuguese manager replied that he was used to that, recalling his iconic celebration in Old Trafford in the second leg of the Champions League round of 16 against Manchester United in 2004, when his team eventually won.

==== Statement about the 2006 Scudetto ====
During the halftime of a January 2009 match against Atalanta, Mourinho was quoted as saying: "The first Scudetto was given to you in the secretariat [referencing the controversial 2005–06 Serie A title awarded to third-placed Inter in the aftermath of the Calciopoli scandal], the second you won it because there was no one there [to compete against], the third [you won it] at the last minute. You are a shitty team." Although Mourinho justified himself by stating that "[s]ometimes you need to tell lies to stimulate the players, to piss them off", he admitted having said the statement.

==== Zeru tituli conference ====
During a press conference on 3 March 2009, Mourinho said that Milan and Roma would end the season with no honours and alleged that Juventus had collected a lot of points thanks to referees' mistakes; he also accused Italian sport journalists of "intellectual prostitution" on their behalf, as they were focusing on a possible mistake regarding a penalty conceded to Inter against Roma instead of talking about the failures of Inter's rivals.

His rant promptly became popular in Italy, especially regarding the "zero titles" quote used by Mourinho, and incorrectly pronounced by him as zeru tituli (in correct Italian it would have been zero titoli), which was later extensively referred to by football journalists in Italy. It also became the title's catchphrase used by fans to celebrate Inter's 17th Scudetto later that season. The catchphrase was even used by Nike to present the celebration shirts for Inter's Serie A title. After the Coppa Italia final in May, fans of Roma's cross-town rivals Lazio, the new Coppa Italia winners, quoted Mourinho's "zeru tituli" statement by wearing shirts with Io campione, tu zero titoli ("I'm a champion, you have no honours") on them.

During the same press conference, Mourinho also attacked Roma manager Luciano Spalletti and Juventus manager Claudio Ranieri: the former as he was used to continuously releasing interviews, in contrast with Mourinho, who disliked that in spite of the fact that he was considered good at it; the latter as he rejected Mourinho's claims that his team had taken advantage of referees' mistakes. Mourinho said that the single time Inter benefitted was an offside goal against Siena.

==== Italy national team representatives ====
Mourinho once again sparked controversy in the summer with his argument with Italy national team coach Marcello Lippi. Lippi predicted that Juventus would win the scudetto in the 2009–10 season, which Mourinho viewed as a disrespectful statement to Inter coming from a national team manager. Lippi responded by saying that it was just a prediction.

After the row with Lippi, he clashed with Italy captain Fabio Cannavaro over Davide Santon's place in the Inter squad. Cannavaro had said that Santon might have to leave Inter to get regular playing time to gain selection for Italy in the upcoming World Cup. Mourinho responded by saying that Cannavaro was acting like "a coach, a sporting director or a president".

==== Incident with Ramazzotti ====
After Inter drew 1–1 with Atalanta on 13 December 2009, Mourinho attacked the Corriere della Sera journalist Andrea Ramazzotti, who was not allowed to stay near the Inter bus according to the Portuguese manager. Ramazzotti had obtained the authorization from both Inter and Atalanta press offices to attend players' interviews in that spot. Allegedly, Mourinho not only insulted the journalist but also grabbed him, thus causing controversy. A lot of colleagues sided with Ramazzotti, defending the general right to report news without fearing to be attacked and considering the incident very serious. Subsequently, Inter president Massimo Moratti phoned Ramazzotti in order to apologise to him. Furthermore, the Federal Prosecutor referred Mourinho "for having said, towards the sports journalist Andrea Ramazzotti, offensive remarks as well as for having grabbed his forearms". Inter was also referred for strict liability.

A few days after, Mourinho confronted the journalists in the press conference preceding the Coppa Italia match against Livorno. The Inter manager explained his behaviour and denied he had physically assaulted Ramazzotti, admitting he had said offensive words he was not proud of. In addition, Mourinho admired the solidarity of Ramazzotti's colleagues and said that he was not supposed to apologize in public as the situation had not happened in public, trying to play down the incident itself.

==== Two draws in a row ====
After two away draws in a row against Parma (1–1 on 10 February 2010) and Napoli (0–0 on 14 February), Mourinho defended Inter's performances, stating that he was satisfied with collecting two more points on the road to the league title, despite those results not being positive themselves. In particular, the Inter manager used some sharp words regarding Walter Mazzarri and Aurelio De Laurentiis, Napoli's respective manager and president.

==== Handcuffs gesture ====
During the Serie A game against Sampdoria on 22 February 2010, which ended in a 0–0 draw, with two Inter players being sent off in the first half, Mourinho was disappointed by Paolo Tagliavento's refereeing. At the end of the first half, the Inter manager made a handcuffs gesture towards a camera which was considered by the Italian Football Federation as violent and critical of the refereeing performance, and caused a three-game ban against Mourinho. Further complaining happened in the second half, when the referee denied Inter a penalty, booking Samuel Eto'o for diving instead, causing Mourinho to laugh ironically as a sign of complaint. The supporters at the San Siro sided with Mourinho with a pañolada, a very unusual form of protest in Italy.

==== Parames statement ====
In February 2010, both Juventus manager Claudio Ranieri and Napoli equivalent Walter Mazzarri released some comments critical of Mourinho: the former said that it was too easy to switch from Chelsea under Roman Abramovich to Massimo Moratti at Inter; the latter stated that he had won more than Mourinho in proportion. Despite Moratti's decision to order a press blackout for Inter following controversial refereeing decisions, Mourinho managed to reply to those managers through his spokesman Eladio Parames.

=== Real Madrid ===
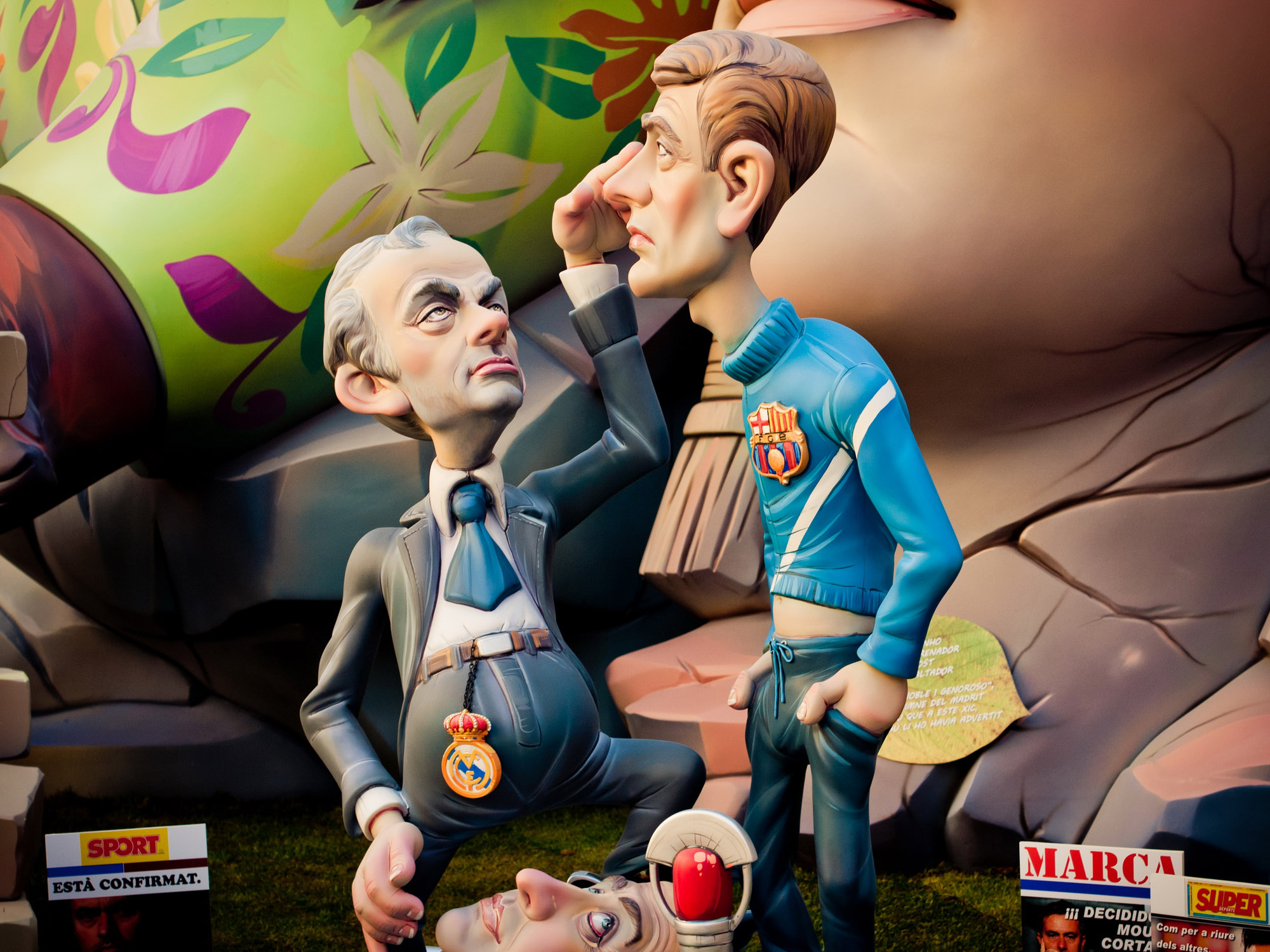
Mourinho was lampooned in Spain following the incident where, as Real Madrid coach, he poked then Barcelona assistant coach Tito Vilanova in the eye.

In a 2010–11 Champions League match at Ajax in November 2010, late in the match when Real Madrid were leading 4–0, two Real Madrid players received late second yellow cards related to time-wasting. The result of this meant they were suspended for the final group match even though Madrid would come first in the group, but would benefit by entering the round of 16 without any accumulated yellow cards. It was suggested after an investigation by UEFA that this was a deliberate ploy under Mourinho's instruction via two players in a substitution. As a result, UEFA charged Mourinho along with the four related players with improper conduct regarding the dismissals. Although Mourinho denied the allegations, he was fined £33,500 and received a one-match Champions League ban.

On 17 August 2011, in the final of the 2011 Supercopa de España, Mourinho was seen gouging the eye of Barcelona's assistant coach Tito Vilanova during a brawl at the end of the game. After the game, Mourinho did not comment on the incident except to claim that he did not know who "Pito" Vilanova was, with "pito" being Spanish slang for penis.

=== Manchester United ===
The Football Heritage speech was made by Mourinho on 16 March 2018, during a press conference after his Manchester United side lost to Sevilla in the UEFA Champions League. The 2–1 loss was the first time that Manchester United lost to Sevilla in European competition. During his 12-minute speech, Mourinho made various remarks and criticised the management of Manchester United, implying that a club's success stems from the calibre of players they sign. Mourinho defended his record of Champions League success in a subsequent press conference before an FA Cup tie against Brighton & Hove Albion.

On 23 October 2016, while Mourinho's Manchester United was trailing 4–0 against Chelsea at Stamford Bridge, Chelsea manager Antonio Conte waved up the home crowd, urging them to make more noise to support the team. At the end of the match, Mourinho shook Conte's hand and whispered into his ear, with media reports claiming Mourinho had accused Conte of trying to humiliate United with his actions. Both managers refused to confirm or deny the report, but Conte disputed claims that he was trying to antagonise Mourinho. Chelsea midfielder Pedro supported Conte, claiming Mourinho's reaction was out of context. The two managers continued to trade insults in January 2018, with Conte calling Mourinho "a little man".

=== Roma ===
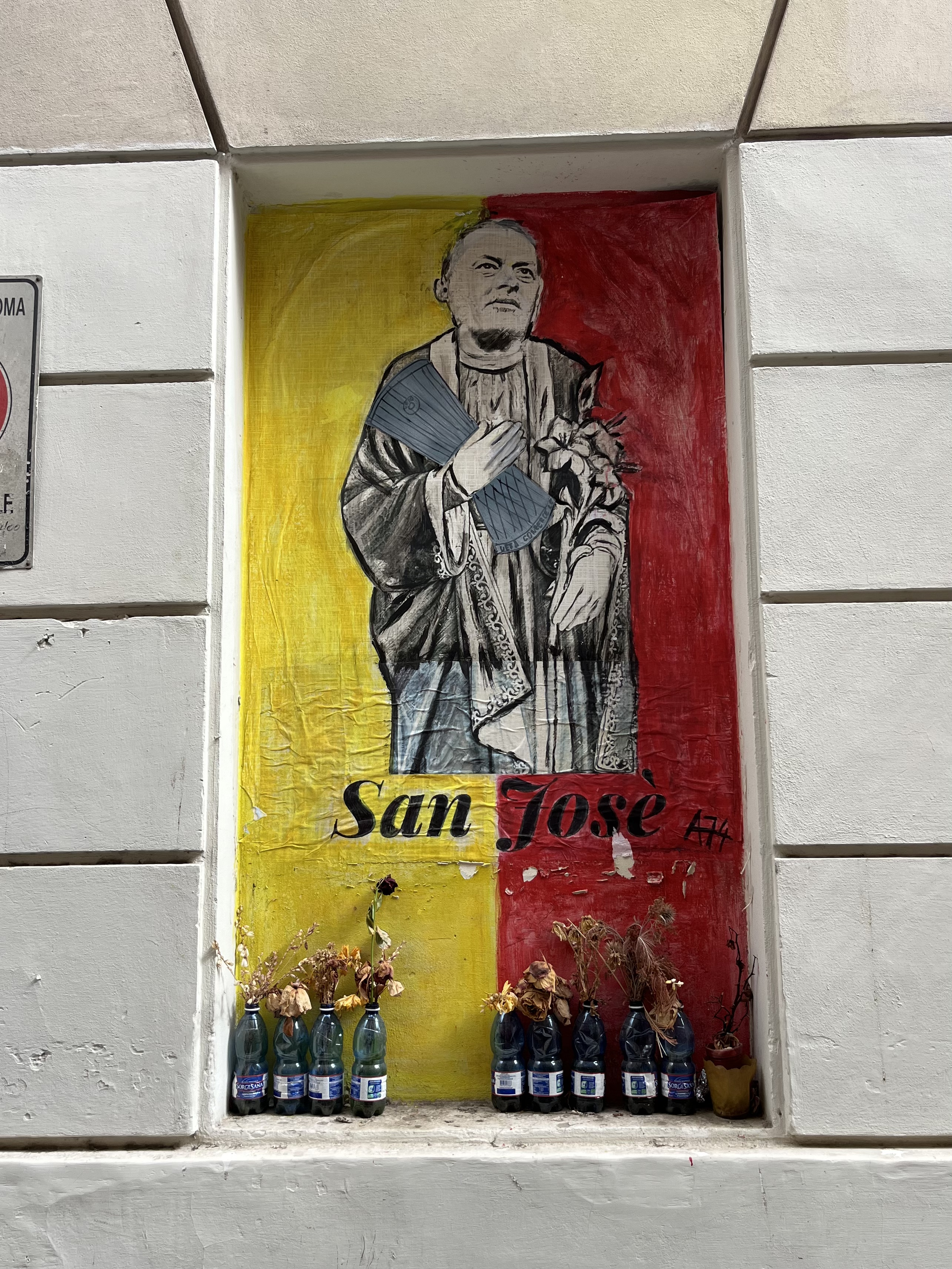
A graffiti in honour of Jose Mourinho in the streets of Rome

On 26 September 2021, after a loss to Lazio, Mourinho blamed the VAR and the referee for the result. On 24 October, in a goalless draw against Napoli, Mourinho was sent off due to frequent protests against the referee. On 31 October against Milan, the Giallorossi coach was fined €10,000 for his "ironic and disrespectful" conduct towards the match official after the final whistle.

On first of December, Roma lost an away game against Bologna. Angry about the referee's decisions, Mourinho confronted him after the match to discuss the match incidents. After the match, Mourinho gave a quick press statement in which he advised Roma's attacker Nicolò Zaniolo to leave Serie A, hinting on presumed unfair treatment by the referees, Mourinho himself was given a yellow card for frequent protests.

On 5 February 2022, the referee disallowed a final minute goal for Roma against Genoa due to a supposed foul by Tammy Abraham, Mourinho said about the incident "If that is a foul, the game is not the same. You have to change the name of football." On 19 February against Hellas Verona, Mourinho was red-carded again after kicking the ball and making a telephone gesture toward the referee. Mourinho reportedly told the referee "Juventus sent you". He was given a two-match touchline ban by the Italian FA and fined 20,000 Euros following the incident.

On 28 February 2023, Mourinho got yet another red card two minutes into the second half during a 2–1 loss to Cremonese, where he was supposedly spoken to and provoked by the fourth official in a disrespectful manner, which resulted in him having the reaction that had him penalised. He said he went to find the official after the game, but he "appears to have forgotten [what he said]". He was given a two-game ban and fined 10,000 euros for the incident.

=== Fenerbahçe ===
On 8 November 2024, Mourinho received a 1-game suspension for comments made at a press conference regarding the Süper Lig. Mourinho was quoted attacking the league by asking "Nobody abroad wants to watch the Turkish league. Who wants to watch this Turkish league abroad?" he said. "Why should they see this? It's too grey, it's too dark, smells bad." During the press conference, Mourinho also claimed that referees in Turkey are biased, saying that "It's more difficult because we play against our opponents…but we play against the system, and to play against the system is the most difficult thing."

On 25 February 2025, following a 0–0 draw between Mourinho's Fenerbahçe and rival Galatasaray, Galatasaray announced that they had initiated criminal proceedings against comments they claimed to be racist statements. During the post-game press conference, Mourinho had praised Slovenian head referee Slavko Vinčić, stating that he told a Turkish referee "If you are the referee...would be a disaster. When I say him, I say the general tendency." Later in the conference, he praised Vinčić for an incident which occurred involving centre back Yusuf Akçiçek; "I have to thank the referee because with a Turkish referee after the big dive and the first minute and their bench jumping like monkeys on top of the kids." After the incident, former professionals such as Didier Drogba, Michael Essien and William Gallas voiced their support for Mourinho on their social media accounts. Mourinho received 4 games suspension and £35,000 fine for his comments about Turkish referees, which had been cut to 2 games and £12,200 fine.

On 2 April 2025, Mourinho grabbed the nose of Galatasaray's manager Okan Buruk after Fenerbahçe lost 2–1 in the quarter-final at Şükrü Saracoğlu Stadium in Istanbul.

=== Benfica ===
After the first leg of Benfica's Champions League knockout phase play-off with Real Madrid, during which Real forward Vinícius Júnior was allegedly racially abused by Benfica's Gianluca Prestianni, Mourinho criticised Vinícius for his exuberant celebration of his winning goal, describing it as "stupid", and appeared to blame him for previous incidents of racism he had endured, stating that "There is something wrong because it happens in every stadium... A stadium where Vinícius plays, something happens, always". In addition, when asked what he had said to Vinícius in a conversation during the match, he said that "I told him the biggest person in the history of this club was Black (referring to Eusébio)... This club, the last thing that it is, is racist". Mourinho was criticised for his comments by the anti-racist football campaign group Kick It Out, who described them as gaslighting, and former Real Madrid midfielder Clarence Seedorf, who suggested that "He’s saying (racist abuse is) OK when Vinícius provokes you... and I think that is very wrong".

== As a media personality ==
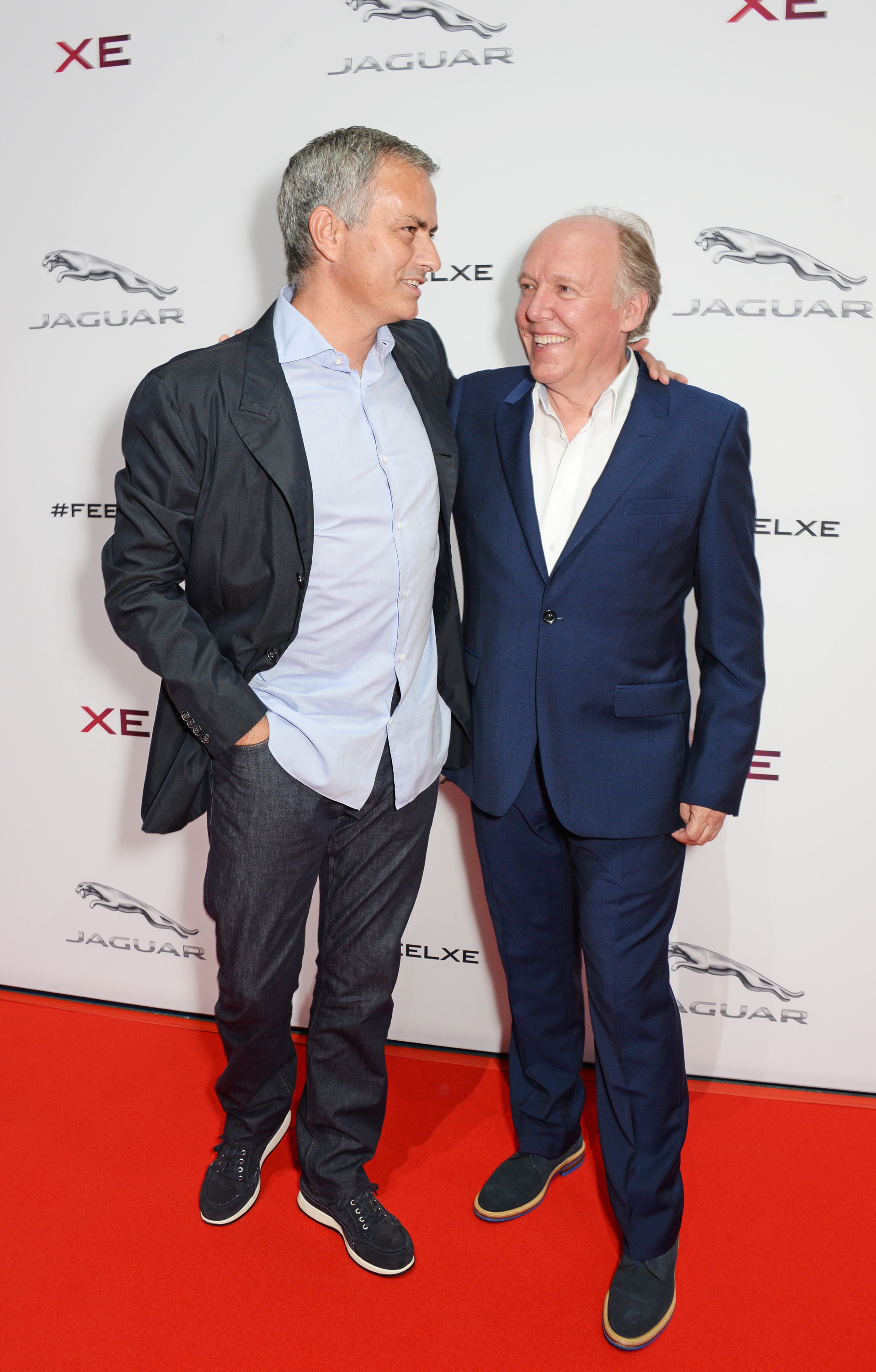
Mourinho as a guest of Jaguar at the 2014 launch of the Jaguar XE in London

Mourinho signed up to cover the 2018 FIFA World Cup as an analyst on RT. In 2019, he began hosting a show on the RT network called On the Touchline with José Mourinho which covered the 2019 UEFA Champions League. In August 2019, Mourinho joined UK broadcaster Sky Sports as a pundit on their Premier League coverage.

In collaboration with DAZN, in 2019 Mourinho appeared in The Making Of series, a 3 part documentary which relives the significant games that helped define football's greatest modern icons. Mourinho was involved in the 2020 Amazon Prime sports docuseries All or Nothing: Tottenham Hotspur (narrated by Tom Hardy) during his spell managing the club.

In October 2022, Mourinho's famous phrase "park the bus" was added to the Oxford English Dictionary. Mourinho had used this phrase to describe Tottenham Hotspur's negative, defensive tactics following a 0–0 draw with his Chelsea side in 2004, stating "they brought the bus and left the bus in front of the goal as we say in my country".

== Personal life ==
Mourinho's wife Matilde "Tami" Faria was born into a wealthy family in Portuguese Angola during the Angolan War of Independence and repatriated after the decolonisation. The Mourinhos met when they were teenagers in Setúbal, Portugal, and the couple married in 1989. Their first child, a daughter, was born in 1996, and they had their first son four years later. The children attended St Peter's International School, a private boarding institution in Palmela, until 2007. Mourinho celebrated his daughter's wedding to the joint venture partner of Winkworth CEO's brother in 2024 at the family estate of Quinta de Catralvos in Azeitão. Mourinho, whilst dedicated to football, said that the "most important thing is my family and being a good father." He was selected as the New Statesman Man of the Year 2005 and was described as a man devoted to his family and work.

Mourinho has been a part of social initiatives and charity work, helping with a youth project bringing Israeli and Palestinian children together through football, and donating his lucky jacket to Tsunami Relief, earning £22,000 for the charity. Since his appointment in 2014, he has acted as a Global Ambassador of the UN World Food Programme. His politics, which he does not publicly express, are believed by journalists to be strongly right-wing. Mourinho is a cousin of the Socialist Party politician and former Portuguese secretary of state Ricardo Mourinho Félix, whose politics he said he did not share.

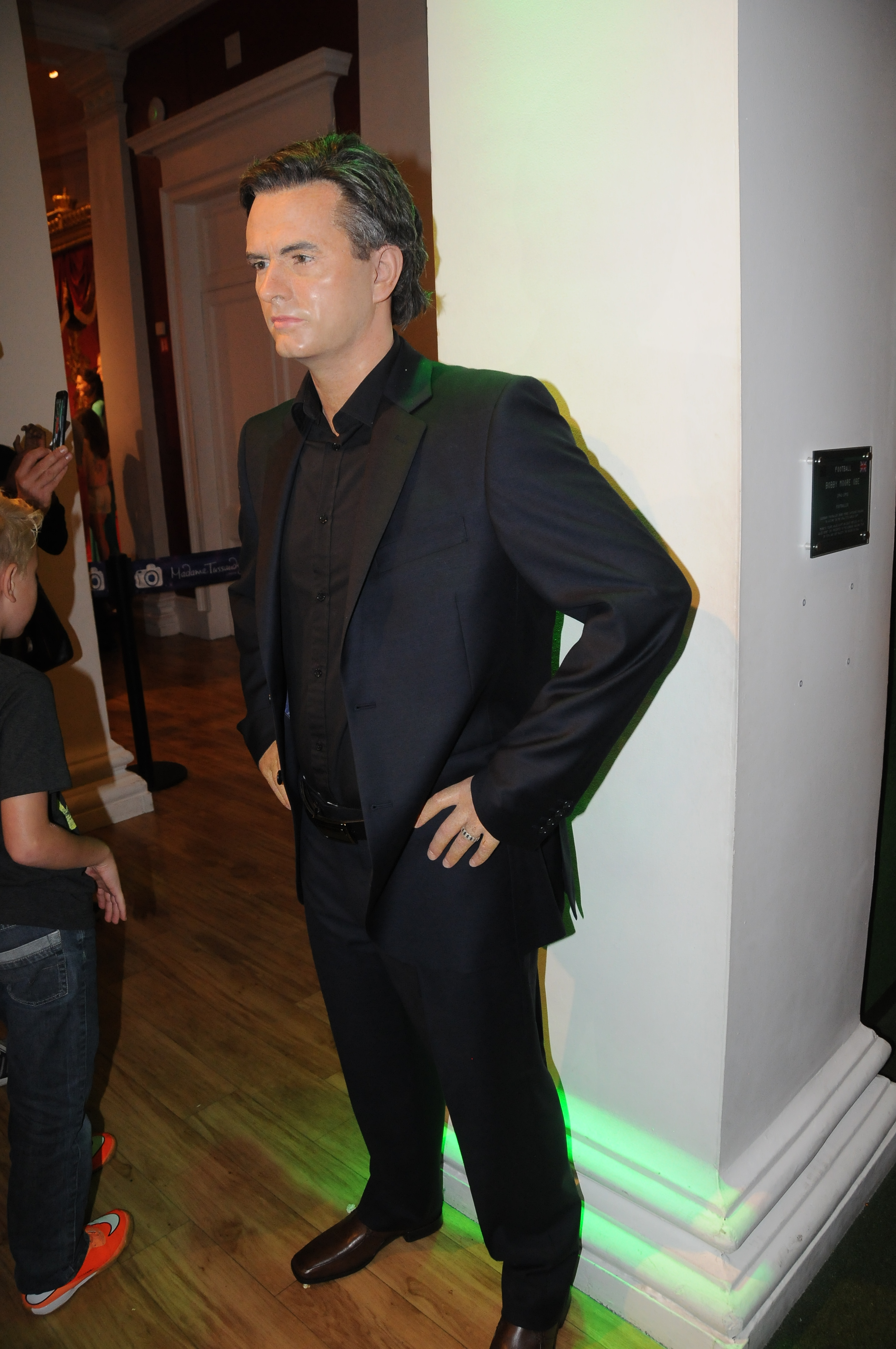
Waxwork of Mourinho at Madame Tussauds, London

Widely known for his strong personality, refined dress sense, and quirky comments, Mourinho has experienced fame outside football, featuring in European advertisement campaigns for Samsung, American Express, Braun, Jaguar and Adidas, amongst others. An unauthorised biography by journalist Joel Neto, titled O Vencedor – De Setúbal a Stamford Bridge (2004; English translation as Mourinho: The True Story, 2005), was a bestseller in Portugal. Mourinho unsuccessfully attempted to prevent it from being published. An official biography by Luís Lourenço, the president of Vitória de Setúbal in 2008–09, who completed a thesis on Mourinho's leadership at the Catholic University of Portugal, appeared in 2010 under the title Mourinho, a Descoberta Guiada, with prefaces from Manuel Sérgio for the Portuguese edition and from the CEO of the Portuguese healthcare company Luz Saúde Isabel Vaz for the Brazilian edition; Lourenço had already published José Mourinho: Made in Portugal in the UK in 2004.

Mourinho was part of an unusual event in 2007 when he was arrested for preventing animal welfare officials from putting his dog into quarantine. The dog had not been sufficiently inoculated, and the situation was resolved after it was returned to Portugal and Mourinho received a caution.

Mourinho is a Roman Catholic, saying, "I believe totally, clearly. Every day I pray; every day I speak with Him. I don't go to the church every day, not even every week. I go when I feel I need to. And when I'm in Portugal, I always go." In 2022, he expanded upon his faith and career, proclaiming: "People think football is my life, but no. There are more important things, including the relationship with God. For me, God is love." Apart from his native Portuguese, Mourinho speaks Spanish, Italian, French, Catalan and English. Mourinho was chosen to voice Pope Francis in a Vatican-approved Portuguese animated film marking the 2017 centenary of the apparition of Our Lady of Fátima.

In 2009, Mourinho was awarded a doctorate honoris causa degree by the Technical University of Lisbon for his accomplishments in football. In 2011, he was named "Rockstar of the Year" by the Spanish Rolling Stone magazine.

== Managerial statistics ==
As of match played 21 November 2026

Managerial record by team and tenure
Team	From	To	Record								Ref.
Team	From	To	P	W	D	L	GF	GA	GD	Win %	Ref.
Benfica	20 September 2000	5 December 2000	11	6	3	2	17	9	+8	54.55	
União de Leiria	1 July 2001	23 January 2002	20	9	7	4	34	20	+14	45.00	
Porto	23 January 2002	2 June 2004	127	91	21	15	254	96	+158	71.65	
Chelsea	2 June 2004	20 September 2007	185	124	40	21	330	119	+211	67.03	
Inter Milan	2 June 2008	28 May 2010	108	67	26	15	185	94	+91	62.04	
Real Madrid	31 May 2010	1 June 2013	178	128	28	22	475	168	+307	71.91	
Chelsea	3 June 2013	17 December 2015	136	80	29	27	245	121	+124	58.82	
Manchester United	27 May 2016	18 December 2018	144	84	32	28	244	121	+123	58.33	
Tottenham Hotspur	20 November 2019	19 April 2021	86	44	19	23	166	103	+63	51.16	
Roma	1 July 2021	16 January 2024	138	68	31	39	213	143	+70	49.28	
Fenerbahçe	2 June 2024	29 August 2025	62	37	14	11	137	71	+66	59.68	
Benfica	18 September 2025	9 June 2026	45	27	10	8	86	39	+47	60.00	
Real Madrid	13 July 2026	Present	17	15	0	2	46	18	+28	88.24	
Total			1,256	779	259	218	2,431	1,122	+1309	62.02	

== Honours ==
=== Assistant manager ===
Porto

- Primeira Divisão: 1994–95, 1995–96
- Taça de Portugal: 1993–94
- Supertaça Cândido de Oliveira: 1994

Barcelona

- La Liga: 1997–98, 1998–99
- Copa del Rey: 1996–97, 1997–98
- Supercopa de España: 1996
- European Cup Winners' Cup: 1996–97
- UEFA Super Cup: 1997

=== Manager ===
Porto

- Primeira Liga: 2002–03, 2003–04
- Taça de Portugal: 2002–03
- Supertaça Cândido de Oliveira: 2003
- UEFA Champions League: 2003–04
- UEFA Cup: 2002–03

Chelsea

- Premier League: 2004–05, 2005–06, 2014–15
- FA Cup: 2006–07
- Football League Cup: 2004–05, 2006–07, 2014–15
- FA Community Shield: 2005

Inter Milan

- Serie A: 2008–09, 2009–10
- Coppa Italia: 2009–10
- Supercoppa Italiana: 2008
- UEFA Champions League: 2009–10

Real Madrid

- La Liga: 2011–12
- Copa del Rey: 2010–11
- Supercopa de España: 2012

Manchester United

- EFL Cup: 2016–17
- FA Community Shield: 2016
- UEFA Europa League: 2016–17

Roma

- UEFA Europa Conference League: 2021–22

Individual

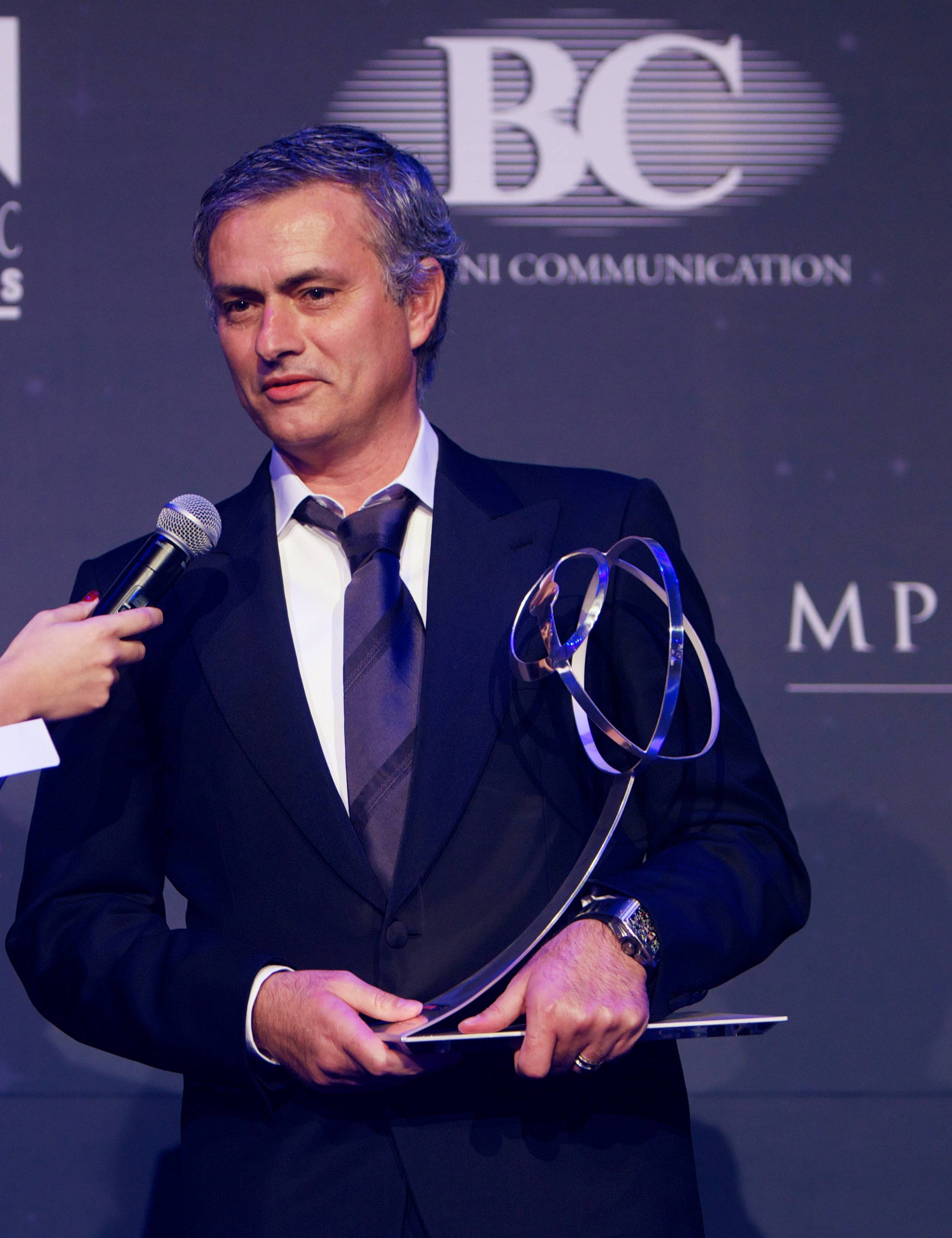
Mourinho receiving the 2012 Globe Soccer Awards Best Coach of the Year award

- Onze d'Or Coach of the Year: 2005
- FIFA World Coach of the Year: 2010
- IFFHS World's Best Club Coach: 2004, 2005, 2010, 2012
- IFFHS World's Best Coach of the 21st Century 2001–2020
- Premier League Manager of the Season: 2004–05, 2005–06, 2014–15
- Premier League Manager of the Month: November 2004, January 2005, March 2007, November 2020
- Serie A Coach of the Year: 2008–09, 2009–10
- Serie A Coach of the Month: August 2022
- La Liga Manager of the Month: October 2026
- Panchina d'Oro: 2009–10
- Miguel Muñoz Trophy: 2010–11, 2011–12
- UEFA Manager of the Year: 2002–03, 2003–04
- UEFA Team of the Year: 2003, 2004, 2005, 2010
- World Soccer World Manager of the Year: 2004, 2005, 2010
- World Soccer 3rd Greatest Manager of All Time: 2013
- ESPN 9th Greatest Manager of All time: 2013
- France Football 13th Greatest Manager of All time: 2019
- BBC Sports Personality of the Year Coach Award: 2005
- La Gazzetta dello Sport Man of the Year: 2010
- International Sports Press Association Best Manager in the World: 2010
- Prémio Prestígio Fernando Soromenho: 2012
- Football Extravaganza's League of Legends (2011)
- Globe Soccer Awards Best Coach of the Year: 2012
- Globe Soccer Awards Best Media Attraction in Football: 2012
- Portuguese Coach of the Century: 2015
- PFA Portuguese Manager of the Year: 2017
- LMA Performances of the Week: (Note: Shared with Manchester United.) 2 December 2017 (Arsenal 1–3 Man.Utd), 7 April 2018 (Man.City 2–3 Man.Utd)
- Italian Football Hall of Fame: 2022

=== Others ===
- Grand Officer of the Order of Prince Henry
- Doctor Honoris causa – for his accomplishments in football from Lisbon Technical University

=== Records ===
Guinness World Records

- Former record holder for most points achieved in a Premier League season (95 points) (Note: This record was made in the 2004–05 season with Chelsea and stood for 13 years but was surpassed by Pep Guardiola in the 2017–18 season with Manchester City (100 points).)
- Youngest manager to reach 100 Champions League games (49 years 12 days)
- Most games unbeaten at home in the Premier League (77)
- Fewest goals conceded in a Premier League season (15 goals)
- Longest football unbeaten home run by a manager (9 years)

Others

- Most Champions League titles with different clubs (two) (Note: This record when given was shared with Ernst Happel and Ottmar Hitzfeld.)

== See also ==
- José Arrogantio – A character based on Mourinho in comedy series Harry and Paul
- "José and his Amazing Technicolor Overcoat" – Single by Mario Rosenstock
- Special 1 TV – Satirical football television programme
- List of football managers with the most matches
