= 2020–21 AS Roma season =

Roma
2020–21 season
- President: Dan Friedkin
- Head coach: Paulo Fonseca
- Stadium: Stadio Olimpico
- Serie A: 7th
- Coppa Italia: Round of 16
- UEFA Europa League: Semi-finals
- Top goalscorer: League: Henrikh Mkhitaryan (13); All: Borja Mayoral (17)
Home colours	Away colours	Third colours

The 2020–21 season was the 94th season in AS Roma's history and the 69th consecutive season in the top flight of Italian football. In addition to the domestic league, Roma participated in this season's editions of the Coppa Italia and also participated in the UEFA Europa League. The season covered the period from 7 August 2020 to 30 June 2021. This season was the last under head coach Paulo Fonseca, who was replaced by José Mourinho next season.

== Players ==
=== Squad information ===
As of 30 June 2021. Appearances and goals include all competitions.

No.	Name	Nat	Position(s)	Date of birth (age)	Signed from	Signed in	Contract ends	Apps.	Goals
Goalkeepers
12	Simone Farelli	(Italy)	GK	19 February 1983 (aged 38)	(Italy) Pescara	2020	2021	0	0
13	Pau López	(Spain)	GK	13 December 1994 (aged 26)	(Spain) Real Betis	2019	2024	76	0
83	Antonio Mirante	(Italy)	GK	8 July 1983 (aged 37)	(Italy) Bologna	2018	2021	35	0
Defenders
2	Rick Karsdorp	(Netherlands)	RB / RM	11 February 1995 (aged 26)	(Netherlands) Feyenoord	2017	2022	60	1
5	Juan Jesus	(Brazil)	CB / LB	10 June 1991 (aged 30)	(Italy) Internazionale	2016	2022	102	1
6	Chris Smalling	(England)	CB	22 November 1989 (aged 31)	(England) Manchester United	2019	2024	59	3
18	Davide Santon	(Italy)	LB / RB	2 January 1991 (aged 30)	(Italy) Internazionale	2018	2022	53	0
19	Bryan Reynolds	(United States)	RB	28 June 2001 (aged 20)	(United States) FC Dallas	2021	2022	5	0
20	Federico Fazio	(Argentina)	CB	17 March 1987 (aged 34)	(England) Tottenham Hotspur	2016	2021	169	14
23	Gianluca Mancini	(Italy)	CB	17 April 1996 (aged 25)	(Italy) Atalanta	2019	2024	82	6
24	Marash Kumbulla	(Albania)	CB	8 February 2000 (aged 21)	(Italy) Hellas Verona	2020	2021	28	2
33	Bruno Peres	(Brazil)	RB / LB	1 March 1990 (aged 31)	(Italy) Torino	2017	2021	132	6
37	Leonardo Spinazzola	(Italy)	LB / LWB	25 March 1993 (aged 28)	(Italy) Juventus	2019	2023	71	4
41	Roger Ibañez	(Brazil)	CB / LB	23 November 1998 (aged 22)	(Italy) Atalanta	2020	2021	50	2
61	Riccardo Calafiori	(Italy)	CB / LB	19 May 2002 (aged 19)	(Italy) Roma Primavera	2020	2023	9	1
Midfielders
4	Bryan Cristante	(Italy)	DM / CM	3 March 1995 (aged 26)	(Italy) Atalanta	2018	2023	125	7
7	Lorenzo Pellegrini (vc)	(Italy)	AM / CM	19 June 1996 (aged 25)	(Italy) Sassuolo	2017	2022	151	20
14	Gonzalo Villar	(Spain)	CM	23 March 1998 (aged 23)	(Spain) Elche	2020	2024	58	0
21	Jordan Veretout	(France)	CM / AM	1 March 1993 (aged 28)	(Italy) Fiorentina	2019	2023	81	18
22	Nicolò Zaniolo	(Italy)	AM	2 July 1999 (aged 21)	(Italy) Internazionale	2018	2024	69	14
27	Javier Pastore	(Argentina)	AM / LW	20 June 1989 (aged 32)	(France) Paris Saint-Germain	2018	2023	37	4
42	Amadou Diawara	(Guinea)	DM	17 July 1997 (aged 23)	(Italy) Napoli	2019	2024	58	1
77	Henrikh Mkhitaryan	(Armenia)	AM / LW	21 January 1989 (aged 32)	(England) Arsenal	2019	2022	73	24
Forwards
9	Edin Džeko (c)	(Bosnia and Herzegovina)	CF	17 March 1986 (aged 35)	(England) Manchester City	2015	2021	260	119
11	Pedro	(Spain)	RW	28 July 1987 (aged 33)	(England) Chelsea	2020	2021	40	6
21	Borja Mayoral	(Spain)	CF	5 April 1997 (aged 24)	(Spain) Real Madrid	2020	2022	45	17
31	Carles Pérez	(Spain)	RW / LW	16 February 1998 (aged 23)	(Spain) Barcelona	2020	2020	47	5
92	Stephan El Shaarawy	(Italy)	LW	27 October 1992 (aged 28)	(China) Shanghai Shenhua	2021	2024	153	42

=== Primavera squad ===
Note: Flags indicate national team as defined under FIFA eligibility rules; some limited exceptions apply. Players may hold more than one non-FIFA nationality.

No.	Pos.	Nation	Player
54	MF	ITA	Riccardo Ciervo
55	MF	GAM	Ebrima Darboe
59	MF	POL	Nicola Zalewski
62	MF	ITA	Tommaso Milanese

No.	Pos.	Nation	Player
63	GK	ITA	Pietro Boer
65	MF	ITA	Filippo Tripi
67	FW	CIV	Mory Bamba

=== Out on loan ===
Note: Flags indicate national team as defined under FIFA eligibility rules; some limited exceptions apply. Players may hold more than one non-FIFA nationality.

No.	Pos.	Nation	Player
—	GK	SWE	Robin Olsen (at Everton until 30 June 2021)
—	DF	ITA	Alessandro Florenzi (at Paris Saint-Germain until 30 June 2021)
—	DF	ITA	Devid Bouah (at Cosenza until 30 June 2021)
—	DF	TUR	Mert Çetin (at Hellas Verona until 30 June 2022)
—	MF	ITA	Alessio Riccardi (at Pescara until 30 June 2021)

No.	Pos.	Nation	Player
—	MF	CRO	Ante Ćorić (at Olimpija Ljubljana until 30 June 2021)
—	MF	FRA	Steven Nzonzi (at Rennes until 30 June 2021)
—	FW	TUR	Cengiz Ünder (at Leicester City until 30 June 2021)
—	FW	NED	Justin Kluivert (at RB Leipzig until 30 June 2021)
—	FW	ITA	Mirko Antonucci (at Salernitana until 30 June 2021)

== Transfers ==
=== In ===
No.	Pos	Player	Transferred from	Fee	Date	Source
77	MF	(Armenia) Henrikh Mkhitaryan	(England) Arsenal	Free	7 August 2020	
23	DF	(Italy) Gianluca Mancini	(Italy) Atalanta	€13M	7 August 2020	
17	MF	(France) Jordan Veretout	(Italy) Fiorentina	€16M	7 August 2020	
31	FW	(Spain) Carles Pérez	(Spain) Barcelona	€11M	7 August 2020	
11	FW	(Spain) Pedro	(England) Chelsea	Free	25 August 2020	
6	DF	(England) Chris Smalling	(England) Manchester United	€15M	5 October 2020	
92	FW	(Italy) Stephan El Shaarawy	(China) Shanghai Shenhua	Free	30 January 2021	

=== Out ===
No.	Pos	Player	Transferred to	Fee	Date	Source
19	FW	(Croatia) Nikola Kalinić	(Spain) Atlético Madrid	Loan return	7 August 2020	
2	DF	(Italy) Davide Zappacosta	(England) Chelsea	Loan return	7 August 2020	
–	FW	(France) Grégoire Defrel	(Italy) Sassuolo	€9M	7 August 2020	
11	DF	(Serbia) Aleksandar Kolarov	(Italy) Internazionale	€1.5M	8 September 2020	
–	FW	(Czech Republic) Patrik Schick	(Germany) Bayer Leverkusen	€26.5M	8 September 2020	
8	FW	(Argentina) Diego Perotti	(Turkey) Fenerbahçe	Free	5 October 2020	

==== Loans in ====
No.	Pos	Player	Transferred from	Fee	Date	Source
24	DF	(Albania) Marash Kumbulla	(Italy) Hellas Verona	Loan	17 September 2020	
21	FW	(Spain) Borja Mayoral	(Spain) Real Madrid	Loan	2 October 2020	
19	DF	(United States) Bryan Reynolds	(United States) FC Dallas	Loan	1 February 2021	

==== Loans out ====
No.	Pos	Player	Transferred to	Fee	Date	Source
–	MF	(France) Steven Nzonzi	(France) Rennes	Loan	7 August 2020	
15	DF	(Turkey) Mert Çetin	(Italy) Hellas Verona	Loan	24 August 2020	
–	DF	(Italy) Alessandro Florenzi	(France) Paris Saint-Germain	Loan	11 September 2020	
17	FW	(Turkey) Cengiz Ünder	(England) Leicester City	Loan	20 September 2020	
99	FW	(Netherlands) Justin Kluivert	(Germany) RB Leipzig	Loan	5 October 2020	
1	GK	(Sweden) Robin Olsen	(England) Everton	Loan	5 October 2020	

== Pre-season and friendlies ==
Win Draw Loss Fixtures

5 September 2020 Friendly	Roma (Italy)	4–2	(Italy) Sambenedettese	Rome, Italy
17:30 CEST (UTC+2)	Veretout 5'; Perotti 11'; Mkhitaryan 31'; Antonucci 68'	Report	López 25' (pen.), 43' (pen.)	Stadium: Trigoria training ground Attendance: 0

9 September 2020 Friendly	Frosinone (Italy)	1–4	(Italy) Roma	Frosinone, Italy
18:00 CEST (UTC+2)	Dionisi 55'	Report	Karsdorp 14'; Ünder 16'; Pellegrini 37'; Mkhitaryan 45'	Stadium: Stadio Benito Stirpe; Attendance: 0

12 September 2020 Friendly	Cagliari (Italy)	2–2	(Italy) Roma	Cagliari, Italy
18:00 CEST (UTC+2)	Rog 38'; Walukiewicz 43'	Report	Ünder 59'; Mkhitaryan 61'	Stadium: Sardegna Arena; Attendance: 0

== Competitions ==
=== Overview ===
Competition	First match	Last match	Starting round	Final position	Record							
Competition	First match	Last match	Starting round	Final position	Pld	W	D	L	GF	GA	GD	Win %
Serie A	19 September 2020	23 May 2021	Matchday 1	7th	38	18	8	12	68	58	+10	47.37
Coppa Italia	19 January 2021		Round of 16	Round of 16	1	0	0	1	0	3	−3	0.00
UEFA Europa League	22 October 2020	6 May 2021	Group stage	Semi-finals	14	10	2	2	31	17	+14	71.43
Total					53	28	10	15	99	78	+21	52.83

Last updated: 23 May 2021
Source: Soccerway

Note: Serie A match against Hellas Verona originally ended in a 0–0 draw; Coppa Italia match against Spezia originally ended in a 2–4 loss.

=== Serie A ===
==== League table ====
Pos	Team	Pld	W	D	L	GF	GA	GD	Pts	Qualification or relegation
5	Napoli	38	24	5	9	86	41	+45	77	Qualification for Europa League group stage (Note: Since the winners of the 2020–21 Coppa Italia, Juventus, qualified for the Champions League, the Europa League berth awarded to the Coppa Italia winners was passed to the sixth-placed team, and the Europa Conference League berth awarded to the sixth-placed team was passed to the seventh-placed team.)
6	Lazio	38	21	5	12	61	55	+6	68	Qualification for Europa League group stage
7	Roma	38	18	8	12	68	58	+10	62	Qualification for Conference League play-off round
8	Sassuolo	38	17	11	10	64	56	+8	62	
9	Sampdoria	38	15	7	16	52	54	−2	52	

Source: Serie A, Soccerway
Rules for classification: 1) Points; 2) Head-to-head points; 3) Head-to-head goal difference; 4) Goal difference; 5) Goals scored; 6) Draw. (Note: Head-to-head record is used only after all the matches between the teams in question have been played)

==== Results summary ====
Overall								Home						Away					
Pld	W	D	L	GF	GA	GD	Pts	W	D	L	GF	GA	GD	W	D	L	GF	GA	GD
38	18	8	12	68	58	+10	62	13	4	2	42	18	+24	5	4	10	26	40	−14

Last updated: 23 May 2021.
Source: Serie A

==== Results by round ====
Round	1	2	3	4	5	6	7	8	9	10	11	12	13	14	15	16	17	18	19	20	21	22	23	24	25	26	27	28	29	30	31	32	33	34	35	36	37	38
Ground	A	H	A	H	A	H	A	H	A	H	A	H	A	H	H	A	H	A	H	H	A	H	A	H	A	H	A	H	A	H	A	H	A	A	H	A	H	A
Result	L	D	W	W	D	W	W	W	L	D	W	W	L	W	W	W	D	L	W	W	L	W	D	L	W	W	L	L	D	W	L	D	L	L	W	L	W	D
Position	19	15	10	8	9	8	4	3	6	6	6	4	5	3	3	3	3	4	3	3	4	3	4	5	5	4	6	6	7	7	7	7	7	7	7	7	7	7

Updated to match(es) played on 23 May 2021. Source: Serie A
A = Away; H = Home; W = Win; D = Draw; L = Loss

==== Matches ====
The league fixtures were announced on 2 September 2020.

19 September 2020 1	Hellas Verona	3–0	Roma	Verona
20:45 CEST (UTC+2)	Danzi (yellow card) 10'; Di Carmine (yellow card) 45+1'	Report		Stadium: Stadio Marcantonio Bentegodi; Referee: Daniele Chiffi
Note: Hellas Verona were awarded a 3–0 win over Roma on 22 September as a result of Roma irregularly fielding Amadou Diawara during the match. Diawara had been registered to the under-22 squad list, despite turning 23 and being eligible for the senior list. The match had originally ended 0–0.

27 September 2020 2	Roma	2–2	Juventus	Rome
20:45 CEST (UTC+2)	Veretout 31' (pen.), 45+1'; Kumbulla (yellow card) 36'; Pellegrini (yellow card) 54'	Report	Rabiot (yellow card) 30' (yellow-red card) 62'; Ronaldo 43' (pen.), 69'; Frabotta (yellow card) 86'	Stadium: Stadio Olimpico; Referee: Marco Di Bello

3 October 2020 3	Udinese	0–1	Roma	Udine
20:45 CEST (UTC+2)	Samir (yellow card) 79'	Report	Pedro 55'	Stadium: Stadio Friuli; Referee: Rosario Abisso

18 October 2020 4	Roma	5–2	Benevento	Rome
20:45 CEST (UTC+2)	Pedro 31'; Ibañez (yellow card) 33'; Džeko 35', 77'; Veretout (yellow card) 52', (goal) 69' (pen.); Santon (yellow card) 65'; Pérez 89'	Report	Caprari 5', (yellow card) 32'; Lapadula (penalty missed) 55, 55'; Foulon (yellow card) 82'	Stadium: Stadio Olimpico; Referee: Giovanni Ayroldi

26 October 2020 5	Milan	3–3	Roma	Milan
20:45 CET (UTC+1)	Ibrahimović 2', 79' (pen.), (yellow card) 75'; Saelemaekers 47'; Leão (yellow card) 70'; Hernandez (yellow card) 83'	Report	Džeko 14'; Veretout 71' (pen.); Pedro (yellow card) 77'; Cristante (yellow card) 81'; Kumbulla 84'	Stadium: San Siro; Referee: Piero Giacomelli

1 November 2020 6	Roma	2–0	Fiorentina	Rome
18:00 CET (UTC+1)	Spinazzola 12'; Džeko (yellow card) 24'; Veretout (yellow card) 33'; Pedro 70'; Cristante (yellow card) 90+1'	Report	Castrovilli (yellow card) 32'; Lirola (yellow card) 51'; Martínez (red card) 89'	Stadium: Stadio Olimpico; Attendance: 0 Referee: Daniele Orsato

8 November 2020 7	Genoa	1–3	Roma	Genoa
15:00 CET (UTC+1)	Zajc (yellow card) 6'; Pjaca 50'	Report	Mkhitaryan 45+2', 67', 85'	Stadium: Stadio Luigi Ferraris; Attendance: 0 Referee: Massimiliano Irrati

22 November 2020 8	Roma	3–0	Parma	Rome
15:00 CET (UTC+1)	Mayoral 28'; Mkhitaryan 32', 40'	Report		Stadium: Stadio Olimpico; Attendance: 0 Referee: Gianluca Manganiello

29 November 2020 9	Napoli	4–0	Roma	Naples
20:45 CET (UTC+1)	Insigne 31'; Di Lorenzo (yellow card) 32'; Fabián 65'; Mertens 81'; Politano 87'	Report	Ibañez (yellow card) 29'; Cristante (yellow card) 77'	Stadium: Stadio San Paolo; Attendance: 0 Referee: Marco Di Bello

6 December 2020 10	Roma	0–0	Sassuolo	Rome
15:00 CET (UTC+1)	Pedro (yellow card) 11' (yellow-red card) 41'; Villar (yellow card) 25'; Mirante (yellow card) 45+2'; Karsdorp (yellow card) 87'	Report	Lopez (yellow card) 18'; Raspadori (yellow card) 71'; Obiang (yellow card) 79'	Stadium: Stadio Olimpico; Attendance: 0 Referee: Fabio Maresca

13 December 2020 11	Bologna	1–5	Roma	Bologna
15:00 CET (UTC+1)	Cristante 24' (o.g.); Soriano (yellow card) 53'; Vignato (yellow card) 62'; Baldursson (yellow card) 78'; Domínguez (yellow card) 90'	Report	Poli 5' (o.g.); Džeko 10'; Pellegrini 15'; Veretout 35', (yellow card) 43'; Mkhitaryan 44'; Ibañez (yellow card) 49'	Stadium: Stadio Renato Dall'Ara; Attendance: 0 Referee: Gianpaolo Calvarese

17 December 2020 12	Roma	3–1	Torino	Rome
20:45 CET (UTC+1)	Peres (yellow card) 21'; Mancini (yellow card) 23'; Mkhitaryan 27'; Veretout 43' (pen.); Villar (yellow card) 56'; Pellegrini 68'; Calafiori (yellow card) 90+2'	Report	Singo (yellow card) 7' (yellow-red card) 14'; Belotti 73'; Lyanco (yellow card) 78'	Stadium: Stadio Olimpico; Attendance: 0 Referee: Rosario Abisso

20 December 2020 13	Atalanta	4–1	Roma	Bergamo
18:00 CET (UTC+1)	Malinovskyi (yellow card) 37'; Romero (yellow card) 39'; Zapata 59'; Gosens 70'; Muriel 72'; Iličić 85'	Report	Džeko 3'; Pellegrini (yellow card) 36'; Mirante (yellow card) 57'; Mancini (yellow card) 64'	Stadium: Gewiss Stadium; Attendance: 0 Referee: Marco Di Bello

23 December 2020 14	Roma	3–2	Cagliari	Rome
20:45 CET (UTC+1)	Veretout 11'; Cristante (yellow card) 19'; Mancini (yellow card) 37', (goal) 77'; Kumbulla (yellow card) 60'; Džeko 71'	Report	Zappa (yellow card) 20'; Nández (yellow card) 29'; João Pedro 59', 90+1' (pen.)	Stadium: Stadio Olimpico; Attendance: 0 Referee: Luca Pairetto

3 January 2021 15	Roma	1–0	Sampdoria	Rome
15:00 CET (UTC+1)	Smalling (yellow card) 8'; Peres (yellow card) 55'; Villar (yellow card) 63'; Džeko 72'	Report	Yoshida (yellow card) 37'; Augello (yellow card) 61'; Ekdal (yellow card) 66'; Tonelli (yellow card) 74'; Jankto (yellow card) 82'	Stadium: Stadio Olimpico; Attendance: 0 Referee: Daniele Chiffi

6 January 2021 16	Crotone	1–3	Roma	Crotone
15:00 CET (UTC+1)	Golemić (yellow card) 33', (goal) 71'; Magallán (yellow card) 41'	Report	Mayoral 8', 29'; Peres (yellow card) 22'; Mkhitaryan 35' (pen.); Ibañez (yellow card) 57'; Pellegrini (yellow card) 88'	Stadium: Stadio Ezio Scida; Attendance: 0 Referee: Marco Piccinini

10 January 2021 17	Roma	2–2	Internazionale	Rome
12:30 CET (UTC+1)	Pellegrini 17'; Smalling (yellow card) 45+1'; Mancini (yellow card) 65', (goal) 86'; Villar (yellow card) 76'	Report	Lukaku (yellow card) 43'; Škriniar 56'; Hakimi 63'; Bastoni (yellow card) 67'; Perišić (yellow card) 90+5'	Stadium: Stadio Olimpico; Attendance: 0 Referee: Marco Di Bello

15 January 2021 18	Lazio	3–0	Roma	Rome
20:45 CET (UTC+1)	Milinković-Savić (yellow card) 11'; Immobile 14'; Radu (yellow card) 20'; Luis Alberto 23', 67'; Acerbi (yellow card) 45+3'; Luiz Felipe (yellow card) 62'; Lucas (yellow card) 63'	Report	Mancini (yellow card) 34'; Smalling (yellow card) 60'; Pedro (yellow card) 71'; Mkhitaryan (yellow card) 90'	Stadium: Stadio Olimpico; Attendance: 0 Referee: Daniele Orsato

23 January 2021 19	Roma	4–3	Spezia	Rome
15:00 CET (UTC+1)	Mayoral 17', 52', (yellow card) 87'; Karsdorp 55'; Peres (yellow card) 87'; Pellegrini 90+2', (yellow card) 90+3'	Report	Chabot (yellow card) 21'; Piccoli 24'; Farias 59'; Verde 90'	Stadium: Stadio Olimpico; Attendance: 0 Referee: Luca Pairetto

31 January 2021 20	Roma	3–1	Hellas Verona	Rome
20:45 CET (UTC+1)	Pellegrini (yellow card) 17'; Mancini 20'; Mkhitaryan 22'; Mayoral 29'; Kumbulla (yellow card) 38'	Report	Faraoni (yellow card) 23'; Colley 62'	Stadium: Stadio Olimpico; Attendance: 0 Referee: Marco Piccinini

6 February 2021 21	Juventus	2–0	Roma	Turin
18:00 CET (UTC+1)	Ronaldo 13', (yellow card) 62'; Arthur (yellow card) 37'; Ibañez 69' (o.g.)	Report	Mancini (yellow card) 35'; Kumbulla (yellow card) 54'	Stadium: Allianz Stadium; Attendance: 0 Referee: Daniele Orsato

14 February 2021 22	Roma	3–0	Udinese	Rome
12:30 CET (UTC+1)	Veretout 5', 25' (pen.), (yellow card) 71'; Pellegrini (yellow card) 56'; Pedro 90+3'	Report		Stadium: Stadio Olimpico; Attendance: 0 Referee: Piero Giacomelli

21 February 2021 23	Benevento	0–0	Roma	Benevento
20:45 CET (UTC+1)	Schiattarella (yellow card) 14'; Glik (yellow card) 45+1' (yellow-red card) 57'; Montipò (yellow card) 85'	Report	Fazio (yellow card) 20'	Stadium: Stadio Ciro Vigorito; Attendance: 0 Referee: Luca Pairetto

28 February 2021 24	Roma	1–2	Milan	Rome
20:45 CET (UTC+1)	Fazio (yellow card) 42'; Veretout 50'; Mkhitaryan (yellow card) 80'; Pellegrini (yellow card) 89'	Report	Kessié 43' (pen.); Saelemaekers (yellow card) 46'; Rebić 58'; Calabria (yellow card) 86'; Castillejo (yellow card) 90+5'	Stadium: Stadio Olimpico; Attendance: 0 Referee: Marco Guida

3 March 2021 25	Fiorentina	1–2	Roma	Florence
20:45 CET (UTC+1)	Spinazzola 60' (o.g.); Ribéry (yellow card) 71'	Report	Mancini (yellow card) 40'; Spinazzola 49'; Kumbulla (yellow card) 74'; Diawara 88'	Stadium: Stadio Artemio Franchi; Attendance: 0 Referee: Gianpaolo Calvarese

7 March 2021 26	Roma	1–0	Genoa	Rome
12:30 CET (UTC+1)	Mancini 24', (yellow card) 65'	Report	Masiello (yellow card) 42'; Destro (yellow card) 45+1'; Strootman (yellow card) 64'; Criscito (yellow card) 84'	Stadium: Stadio Olimpico; Attendance: 0 Referee: Michael Fabbri

14 March 2021 27	Parma	2–0	Roma	Parma
15:00 CET (UTC+1)	Mihăilă 9'; Osorio (yellow card) 23'; Hernani 55' (pen.), (yellow card) 66'; Karamoh (yellow card) 90+3'	Report	Peres (yellow card) 32'; Pellegrini (yellow card) 54'; Džeko (yellow card) 69'	Stadium: Stadio Ennio Tardini; Attendance: 0 Referee: Marco Piccinini

21 March 2021 28	Roma	0–2	Napoli	Rome
20:45 CET (UTC+1)	Ibañez (yellow card) 26'; Mancini (yellow card) 45+1'; Diawara (yellow card) 59'; El Shaarawy (yellow card) 64'; Villar (yellow card) 85'	Report	Mertens 27', 34'; Zieliński (yellow card) 47'; Koulibaly (yellow card) 78'; Osimhen (yellow card) 90+1'	Stadium: Stadio Olimpico; Attendance: 0 Referee: Marco Di Bello

3 April 2021 29	Sassuolo	2–2	Roma	Reggio Emilia
15:00 CEST (UTC+2)	Đuričić (yellow card) 2'; Traorè 57'; Raspadori 85'; Rogério (yellow card) 87'; Turati (yellow card) 90'; Haraslín (yellow card) 90+3'	Report	Diawara (yellow card) 15'; Pellegrini 26' (pen.), (yellow card) 44'; Peres 69'; Cristante (yellow card) 90+2'	Stadium: Mapei Stadium; Attendance: 0 Referee: Luca Pairetto

11 April 2021 30	Roma	1–0	Bologna	Rome
18:00 CEST (UTC+2)	Pedro (yellow card) 36'; Mayoral 44'; Villar (yellow card) 75'; Pellegrini (yellow card) 83'	Report	De Silvestri (yellow card) 38'; Soumaoro (yellow card) 81'	Stadium: Stadio Olimpico; Attendance: 0 Referee: Marco Guida

18 April 2021 31	Torino	3–1	Roma	Turin
18:00 CEST (UTC+2)	Nkoulou (yellow card) 51'; Sanabria 57'; Verdi (yellow card) 65'; Zaza 71'; Rincón 90+2'	Report	Mayoral 3'; Diawara (yellow card) 75' (yellow-red card) 85'	Stadium: Stadio Olimpico Grande Torino; Attendance: 0 Referee: Davide Massa

22 April 2021 32	Roma	1–1	Atalanta	Rome
18:30 CEST (UTC+2)	Calafiori (yellow card) 31'; Villar (yellow card) 47'; Cristante 75'; Ibañez (yellow card) 90+4' (yellow-red card) 90+5'	Report	Malinovskyi 26'; Gosens (yellow card) 52' (yellow-red card) 69'	Stadium: Stadio Olimpico; Attendance: 0 Referee: Gianpaolo Calvarese

25 April 2021 33	Cagliari	3–2	Roma	Cagliari
18:00 CEST (UTC+2)	Lykogiannis 4'; Marin (yellow card) 53', (goal) 57'; João Pedro 64', (yellow card) 80'; Duncan (yellow card) 90+3'	Report	Pérez 27'; Fazio 69'; Cristante (yellow card) 83'	Stadium: Sardegna Arena; Attendance: 0 Referee: Massimiliano Irrati

2 May 2021 34	Sampdoria	2–0	Roma	Genoa
20:45 CEST (UTC+2)	Silva 45'; Jankto 66'	Report	Kumbulla (yellow card) 24'; Cristante (yellow card) 32'; Mancini (yellow card) 70'; Džeko (penalty missed) 72'	Stadium: Stadio Luigi Ferraris; Attendance: 0 Referee: Juan Luca Sacchi

9 May 2021 35	Roma	5–0	Crotone	Rome
18:00 CEST (UTC+2)	Mayoral 47', 90'; Darboe (yellow card) 54'; Cristante (yellow card) 62'; Pellegrini 70', 73'; Mkhitaryan 78'	Report		Stadium: Stadio Olimpico; Attendance: 0 Referee: Simone Sozza

12 May 2021 36	Internazionale	3–1	Roma	Milan
20:45 CEST (UTC+2)	Brozović 11'; Vecino 20'; Lukaku 90'	Report	Darboe (yellow card) 6'; Santon (yellow card) 28'; Mkhitaryan 31'; Kumbulla (yellow card) 71'; Karsdorp (yellow card) 82'	Stadium: San Siro; Attendance: 0 Referee: Daniele Chiffi

15 May 2021 37	Roma	2–0	Lazio	Rome
20:45 CEST (UTC+2)	Peres (yellow card) 16'; Mkhitaryan 42'; Santon (yellow card) 47'; Pedro 78'	Report	Acerbi (yellow card) 23' (yellow-red card) 87'	Stadium: Stadio Olimpico; Attendance: 0 Referee: Luca Pairetto

23 May 2021 38	Spezia	2–2	Roma	La Spezia
20:45 CEST (UTC+2)	Verde 6'; Pobega 38'	Report	El Shaarawy 52'; Mkhitaryan 85'; Kumbulla (yellow card) 90+4'	Stadium: Stadio Alberto Picco; Attendance: 0 Referee: Ivano Pezzuto

=== Coppa Italia ===
19 January 2021 Round of 16	Roma	0–3	Spezia	Rome
21:15 CET (UTC+1)	Pellegrini 43' (pen.), (yellow card) 111'; Mancini (yellow card) 51' (yellow-red card) 92'; Mkhitaryan 73'; López (red card) 92'	Report	Galabinov 6' (pen.); Agudelo (yellow card) 13'; Saponara 15', 119'; Ismajli (yellow card) 24'; Dell'Orco (yellow card) 90+1'; Verde 107'	Stadium: Stadio Olimpico; Referee: Davide Ghersini
Note: Match awarded 3–0 to Spezia, due to Roma making six substitutions instead of the maximum five allowed. Spezia had originally won 4–2 after extra time.

=== UEFA Europa League ===
==== Group stage ====
The group stage draw was held on 2 October 2020.

Pos	Team	Pld	W	D	L	GF	GA	GD	Pts	Qualification	ROM	YB	CLJ	CSS
1	(Italy) Roma	6	4	1	1	13	5	+8	13	Advance to knockout phase	—	3–1	5–0	0–0
2	(Switzerland) Young Boys	6	3	1	2	9	7	+2	10	Advance to knockout phase	1–2	—	2–1	3–0
3	(Romania) CFR Cluj	6	1	2	3	4	10	−6	5 (Note: Head-to-head points: CFR Cluj 4, CSKA Sofia 1.)		0–2	1–1	—	0–0
4	(Bulgaria) CSKA Sofia	6	1	2	3	3	7	−4	5		3–1	0–1	0–2	—

Source: UEFA
Rules for classification: Group stage tiebreakers
Notes:

22 October 2020 1	Young Boys (Switzerland)	1–2	(Italy) Roma	Bern, Switzerland
18:55 CEST (UTC+2)	Nsame 14' (pen.); Zesiger (yellow card) 52'; Mambimbi (yellow card) 76'; Gaudino (yellow card) 81'	Report	Karsdorp (yellow card) 39'; Fazio (yellow card) 50'; Juan Jesus (yellow card) 56'; Villar (yellow card) 58'; Peres (yellow card) 62', (goal) 69'; Kumbulla 74'	Stadium: Stadion Wankdorf; Attendance: 600; Referee: Carlos del Cerro Grande (Spain)

29 October 2020 2	Roma (Italy)	0–0	(Bulgaria) CSKA Sofia	Rome, Italy
21:00 CET (UTC+1)	Peres (yellow card) 41'; Karsdorp (yellow card) 80'; Villar (yellow card) 84'	Report	Zanev (yellow card) 86'; Busatto (yellow card) 87'	Stadium: Stadio Olimpico; Attendance: 0 (Note: Due to the COVID-19 pandemic in Europe, the match was played behind closed doors.); Referee: Aleksei Kulbakov (Belarus)

5 November 2020 3	Roma (Italy)	5–0	(Romania) CFR Cluj	Rome, Italy
18:55 CET (UTC+1)	Mkhitaryan 2'; Ibañez 24'; Mayoral 34', 84'; Pedro 89'	Report	Hoban (yellow card) 61'; Carnat (yellow card) 81'	Stadium: Stadio Olimpico; Attendance: 0 Referee: Matej Jug (Slovenia)

26 November 2020 4	CFR Cluj (Romania)	0–2	(Italy) Roma	Cluj-Napoca, Romania
21:00 CET (UTC+1)	Itu (yellow card) 35'; Păun (yellow card) 37'; Đoković (yellow card) 43'; Burcă (yellow card) 66'; Camora (yellow card) 71'	Report	Debeljuh 49' (o.g.); Diawara (yellow card) 53'; Veretout 67' (pen.); Džeko (yellow card) 90+3'	Stadium: Stadionul Dr. Constantin Rădulescu; Attendance: 0 Referee: Harald Lechner (Austria)

3 December 2020 5	Roma (Italy)	3–1	(Switzerland) Young Boys	Rome, Italy
21:00 CET (UTC+1)	Calafiori (yellow card) 29', (goal) 59'; Mayoral 44'; Džeko 81'; Mkhitaryan (yellow card) 83'	Report	Nsame 34'; Elia (yellow card) 74'; Camara (red card) 83'	Stadium: Stadio Olimpico; Attendance: 0 Referee: Fran Jović (Croatia)

10 December 2020 6	CSKA Sofia (Bulgaria)	3–1	(Italy) Roma	Sofia, Bulgaria
18:55 CET (UTC+1)	Rodrigues 5'; Sowe 34', 55'; Antov (yellow card) 89'	Report	Milanese 22'; Tripi (yellow card) 83'	Stadium: Vasil Levski National Stadium; Attendance: 0 Referee: Irfan Peljto (Bosnia and Herzegovina)

==== Knockout phase ====
===== Round of 32 =====
The draw for the round of 32 was held on 14 December 2020.

18 February 2021 First leg	Braga (Portugal)	0–2	(Italy) Roma	Braga, Portugal
18:55 CET (UTC+1)	Esgaio (yellow card) 32' (yellow-red card) 54'; Silva (yellow card) 89'	Report	Džeko 5'; Mayoral 86'; Mancini (yellow card) 90+6'	Stadium: Estádio Municipal; Attendance: 0 Referee: István Kovács (Romania)

25 February 2021 Second leg	Roma (Italy)	3–1 (5–1 agg.)	(Portugal) Braga	Rome, Italy
21:00 CET (UTC+1)	Džeko 24'; Veretout (yellow card) 57'; Pellegrini (penalty missed) 72'; Pérez 75'; Mayoral 90+1'	Report	Cristante 88' (o.g.)	Stadium: Stadio Olimpico; Attendance: 0 Referee: Andreas Ekberg (Sweden)

===== Round of 16 =====
The draw for the round of 16 was held on 26 February 2021.

11 March 2021 First leg	Roma (Italy)	3–0	(Ukraine) Shakhtar Donetsk	Rome, Italy
21:00 CET (UTC+1)	Pellegrini 23'; Kumbulla (yellow card) 55'; El Shaarawy 73'; Mancini 77', (yellow card) 83'	Report	Patrick (yellow card) 58'; Maycon (yellow card) 74'; Taison (yellow card) 75'	Stadium: Stadio Olimpico; Attendance: 0 Referee: Artur Soares Dias (Portugal)

18 March 2021 Second leg	Shakhtar Donetsk (Ukraine)	1–2 (1–5 agg.)	(Italy) Roma	Kyiv, Ukraine
19:55 EET (UTC+2)	Antônio (yellow card) 38'; Patrick (yellow card) 55'; Moraes 59'	Report	Ibañez (yellow card) 25'; Mayoral 48', 72'; Karsdorp (yellow card) 57'	Stadium: NSC Olimpiyskiy Stadium; Attendance: 0 Referee: Antonio Mateu Lahoz (Spain)
Note: Shakhtar Donetsk played their home match at the NSC Olimpiyskiy Stadium in Kyiv, instead of their regular stadium, the Donbas Arena in Donetsk, due to the war in Donbas.

===== Quarter-finals =====
The draw for the quarter-finals was held on 19 March 2021.

8 April 2021 First leg	Ajax (Netherlands)	1–2	(Italy) Roma	Amsterdam, Netherlands
21:00 CEST (UTC+2)	Klaassen 39'; Tadić (penalty missed) 53'; Rensch (yellow card) 71'; Martínez (yellow card) 86'	Report	Pellegrini 57'; Peres (yellow card) 78'; Ibañez 87'; Cristante (yellow card) 90'; Calafiori (yellow card) 90+4'	Stadium: Johan Cruyff Arena; Attendance: 0 Referee: Sergei Karasev (Russia)

15 April 2021 Second leg	Roma (Italy)	1–1 (3–2 agg.)	(Netherlands) Ajax	Rome, Italy
21:00 CEST (UTC+2)	Ibañez (yellow card) 43'; Veretout (yellow card) 67'; Mancini (yellow card) 68'; Džeko 72', (yellow card) 79'; Cristante (yellow card) 86'	Report	Brobbey 49'; Tagliafico (yellow card) 89'; Martínez (yellow card) 90+2'	Stadium: Stadio Olimpico; Attendance: 0 Referee: Anthony Taylor (England)

===== Semi-finals =====
The draw for the semi-finals was held on 19 March 2021, after the quarter-final draw.

29 April 2021 First leg	Manchester United (England)	6–2	(Italy) Roma	Manchester, England
20:00 BST (UTC+1)	Fernandes 9', 71' (pen.); Cavani 48', 64'; Pogba (yellow card) 51', (goal) 75'; Greenwood 86'	Report	Pellegrini 15' (pen.); Džeko 34'; Villar (yellow card) 50'; Smalling (yellow card) 61'	Stadium: Old Trafford; Attendance: 0 Referee: Carlos del Cerro Grande (Spain)

6 May 2021 Second leg	Roma (Italy)	3–2 (5–8 agg.)	(England) Manchester United	Rome, Italy
21:00 CEST (UTC+2)	Džeko 57'; Cristante 60', (yellow card) 84'; Karsdorp (yellow card) 72'; Telles 83' (o.g.)	Report	Wan-Bissaka (yellow card) 18'; Cavani 39', 68', (yellow card) 72'; Fred (yellow card) 58'; Williams (yellow card) 90+2'	Stadium: Stadio Olimpico; Attendance: 0 Referee: Felix Brych (Germany)

== Statistics ==
=== Appearances and goals ===
No.	Pos	Nat	Player	Total		Serie A		Coppa Italia		Europa League	
No.	Pos	Nat	Player	Apps	Goals	Apps	Goals	Apps	Goals	Apps	Goals
Goalkeepers
12	GK	(Italy) ITA	Simone Farelli	0	0	0	0	0	0	0	0
13	GK	(Spain) ESP	Pau López	34	0	20+1	0	1	0	12	0
63	GK	(Italy) ITA	Pietro Boer	1	0	0	0	0	0	1	0
83	GK	(Italy) ITA	Antonio Mirante	15	0	13	0	0	0	1+1	0
87	GK	(Brazil) BRA	Daniel Fuzato	6	0	5	0	0+1	0	0	0
Defenders
2	DF	(Netherlands) NED	Rick Karsdorp	45	1	28+6	1	0+1	0	8+2	0
3	DF	(Brazil) BRA	Roger Ibañez	40	2	28+2	0	0+1	0	8+1	2
5	DF	(Brazil) BRA	Juan Jesus	11	0	0+5	0	0	0	4+2	0
6	DF	(England) ENG	Chris Smalling	21	0	13+3	0	0	0	3+2	0
18	DF	(Italy) ITA	Davide Santon	11	0	7+3	0	0	0	0+1	0
19	DF	(United States) USA	Bryan Reynolds	5	0	3+2	0	0	0	0	0
20	DF	(Argentina) ARG	Federico Fazio	11	1	5+1	1	0	0	4+1	0
23	DF	(Italy) ITA	Gianluca Mancini	41	5	33	4	1	0	6+1	1
24	DF	(Albania) ALB	Marash Kumbulla	28	2	14+7	1	1	0	6	1
33	DF	(Brazil) BRA	Bruno Peres	44	2	14+16	1	1	0	9+4	1
37	DF	(Italy) ITA	Leonardo Spinazzola	39	2	25+2	2	1	0	8+3	0
61	DF	(Italy) ITA	Riccardo Calafiori	8	1	1+2	0	0	0	3+2	1
65	DF	(Italy) ITA	Filippo Tripi	2	0	0	0	0	0	0+2	0
Midfielders
4	MF	(Italy) ITA	Bryan Cristante	48	1	22+12	1	1	0	13	0
7	MF	(Italy) ITA	Lorenzo Pellegrini	47	11	30+4	7	1	1	6+6	3
14	MF	(Spain) ESP	Gonzalo Villar	47	0	21+12	0	1	0	8+5	0
17	MF	(France) FRA	Jordan Veretout	38	11	25+4	10	0+1	0	6+2	1
22	MF	(Italy) ITA	Nicolò Zaniolo	0	0	0	0	0	0	0	0
27	MF	(Argentina) ARG	Javier Pastore	5	0	0+5	0	0	0	0	0
42	MF	(Guinea) GUI	Amadou Diawara	28	1	7+11	1	0	0	10	0
52	MF	(Italy) ITA	Edoardo Bove	1	0	0+1	0	0	0	0	0
55	MF	(The Gambia) GAM	Ebrima Darboe	6	0	4+1	0	0	0	0+1	0
59	MF	(Poland) POL	Nicola Zalewski	2	1	0+1	0	0	0	0+1	1
62	MF	(Italy) ITA	Tommaso Milanese	3	1	0	0	0	0	1+2	1
77	MF	(Armenia) ARM	Henrikh Mkhitaryan	46	15	30+4	13	1	1	7+4	1
Forwards
9	FW	(Bosnia and Herzegovina) BIH	Edin Džeko	38	13	20+7	7	0+1	0	6+4	6
11	FW	(Spain) ESP	Pedro	40	6	20+7	5	1	0	9+3	1
21	FW	(Spain) ESP	Borja Mayoral	43	17	18+13	10	1	0	7+4	7
31	FW	(Spain) ESP	Carles Pérez	31	3	6+15	2	0+1	0	6+3	1
67	FW	(Ivory Coast) CIV	Mory Bamba	1	0	0	0	0	0	1	0
92	FW	(Italy) ITA	Stephan El Shaarawy	14	2	6+4	1	0	0	1+3	1
Players transferred out during the season
1	GK	(Sweden) SWE	Robin Olsen	0	0	0	0	0	0	0	0
8	FW	(Argentina) ARG	Diego Perotti	0	0	0	0	0	0	0	0
48	FW	(Italy) ITA	Mirko Antonucci	0	0	0	0	0	0	0	0
99	FW	(Netherlands) NED	Justin Kluivert	2	0	0+2	0	0	0	0	0

Last updated: 8 April 2021
Source: Competitions

=== Goalscorers ===
As of 9 May 2021

Rank	No.	Pos.	Name	Serie A	Coppa Italia	Europa League	Total
1	21	FW	(Spain) Borja Mayoral	10	0	7	17
2	77	MF	(Armenia) Henrikh Mkhitaryan	13	1	1	15
3	9	FW	(Bosnia and Herzegovina) Edin Džeko	7	0	6	13
4	17	MF	(France) Jordan Veretout	10	0	1	11
4	7	MF	(Italy) Lorenzo Pellegrini	7	1	3	11
6	11	FW	(Spain) Pedro	5	0	1	6
7	23	DF	(Italy) Gianluca Mancini	4	0	1	5
8	31	FW	(Spain) Carles Pérez	2	0	1	3
9	24	DF	(Albania) Marash Kumbulla	1	0	1	2
9	37	DF	(Italy) Leonardo Spinazzola	2	0	0	2
9	33	DF	(Brazil) Bruno Peres	1	0	1	2
9	3	DF	(Brazil) Roger Ibañez	0	0	2	2
9	4	MF	(Italy) Bryan Cristante	1	0	1	2
9	92	FW	(Italy) Stephan El Shaarawy	1	0	1	2
15	2	DF	(Netherlands) Rick Karsdorp	1	0	0	1
15	20	DF	(Argentina) Federico Fazio	1	0	0	1
15	42	MF	(Guinea) Amadou Diawara	1	0	0	1
15	61	DF	(Italy) Riccardo Calafiori	0	0	1	1
15	62	MF	(Italy) Tommaso Milanese	0	0	1	1
15	59	MF	(Poland) Nicola Zalewski	0	0	1	1
Own goals				1	0	1	2
Totals				68	2	31	101
