= 2021–22 AS Roma season =

Roma
2021–22 season
- President: Dan Friedkin
- Head coach: José Mourinho
- Stadium: Stadio Olimpico
- Serie A: 6th
- Coppa Italia: Quarter-finals
- UEFA Europa Conference League: Winners
- Top goalscorer: League: Tammy Abraham (17); All: Tammy Abraham (27)
Home colours	Away colours	Third colours

The 2021–22 season was AS Roma's 95th season in existence and the club's 70th consecutive season in the top flight of Italian football. In addition to the domestic league, Roma participated in this season's editions of the Coppa Italia and the inaugural edition of the UEFA Europa Conference League, winning the latter tournament for the club's first major trophy since the 2007–08 Coppa Italia.

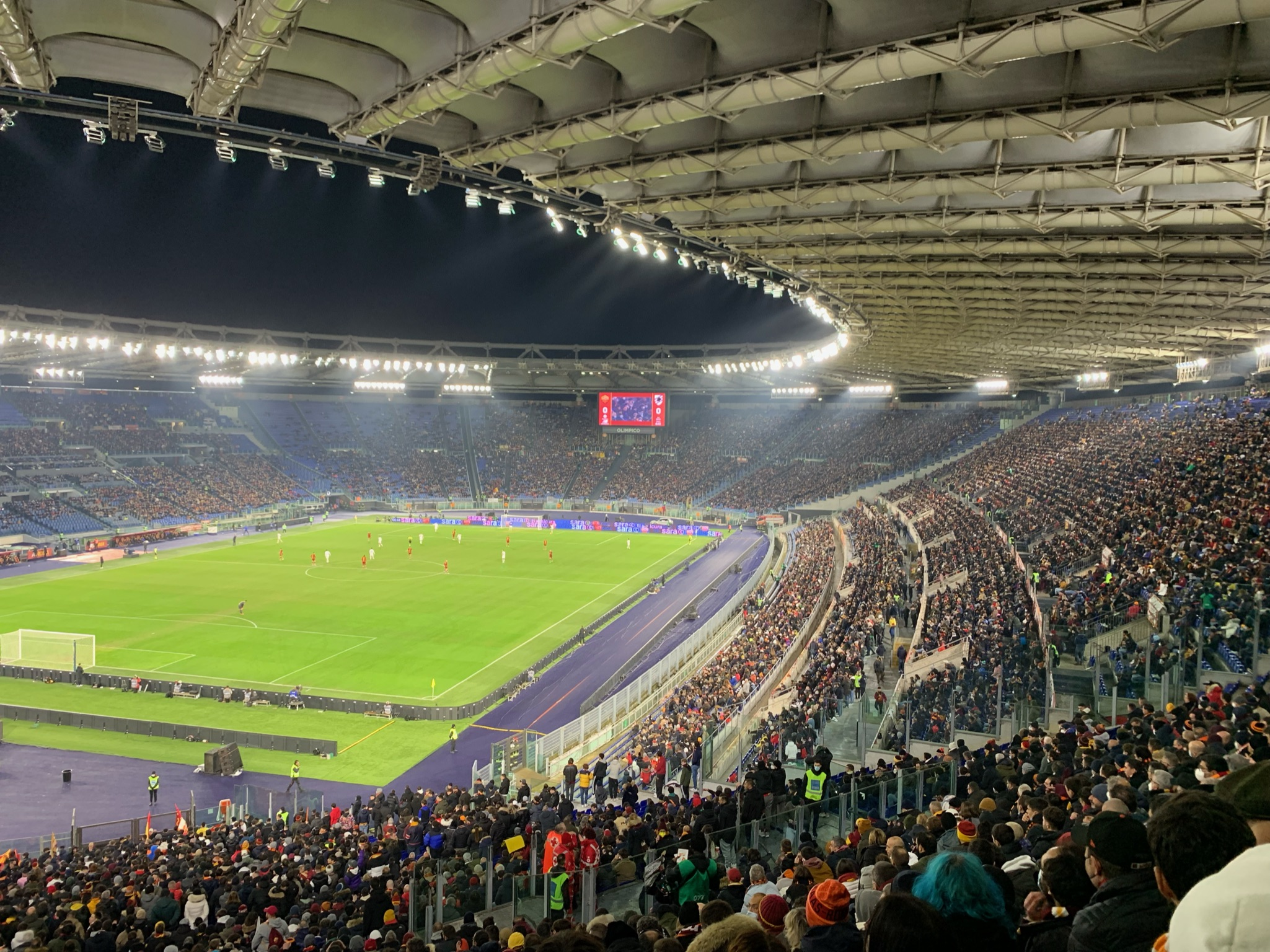
The Stadio Olimpico during a match between Roma and Sampdoria

The season began with José Mourinho at the helm after Roma announced last season that Paulo Fonseca would step down.

== Players ==
=== Squad information ===
As of 30 June 2022.

No.	Name	Nat	Position(s)	Date of birth (age)	Signed from	Signed in	Contract ends	Apps.	Goals
Goalkeepers
1	Rui Patrício	(Portugal)	GK	15 February 1988 (aged 34)	(England) Wolverhampton Wanderers	2021	2024	54	0
63	Pietro Boer	(Italy)	GK	12 May 2002 (aged 20)	(Italy) Roma Primavera	2021	2024	1	0
87	Daniel Fuzato	(Brazil)	GK	4 July 1997 (aged 24)	(Brazil) Palmeiras	2018	2022	8	0
Defenders
2	Rick Karsdorp	(Netherlands)	RB / RM	11 February 1995 (aged 27)	(Netherlands) Feyenoord	2017	2025	111	1
3	Roger Ibañez	(Brazil)	CB / LB	23 November 1998 (aged 23)	(Italy) Atalanta	2020	2025	101	6
5	Matías Viña	(Uruguay)	LB	9 November 1997 (aged 24)	(Brazil) Palmeiras	2021	2026	37	0
6	Chris Smalling	(England)	CB	22 November 1989 (aged 32)	(England) Manchester United	2019	2024	96	7
18	Davide Santon	(Italy)	LB / RB	2 January 1991 (aged 31)	(Italy) Internazionale	2018	2022	53	0
19	Bryan Reynolds	(United States)	RB	28 June 2001 (aged 21)	(United States) FC Dallas	2021	2025	8	0
23	Gianluca Mancini (vc)	(Italy)	CB	17 April 1996 (aged 26)	(Italy) Atalanta	2019	2024	128	7
24	Marash Kumbulla	(Albania)	CB	8 February 2000 (aged 22)	(Italy) Hellas Verona	2020	2025	56	3
37	Leonardo Spinazzola	(Italy)	LB / LWB	25 March 1993 (aged 29)	(Italy) Juventus	2019	2024	75	4
Midfielders
4	Bryan Cristante	(Italy)	DM / CM	3 March 1995 (aged 27)	(Italy) Atalanta	2018	2025	175	10
7	Lorenzo Pellegrini (c)	(Italy)	AM / CM	19 June 1996 (aged 26)	(Italy) Sassuolo	2017	2026	192	34
15	Ainsley Maitland-Niles	(England)	CM / RB	29 August 1997 (aged 24)	(England) Arsenal	2022	2022	12	0
21	Jordan Veretout	(France)	CM / AM	1 March 1993 (aged 29)	(Italy) Fiorentina	2019	2023	131	22
22	Nicolò Zaniolo	(Italy)	AM	2 July 1999 (aged 22)	(Italy) Internazionale	2018	2024	111	22
27	Sérgio Oliveira	(Portugal)	DM	2 June 1992 (aged 30)	(Portugal) Porto	2022	2022	22	3
42	Amadou Diawara	(Guinea)	DM	17 July 1997 (aged 24)	(Italy) Napoli	2019	2024	66	2
52	Edoardo Bove	(Italy)	DM / CM	16 May 2002 (aged 20)	(Italy) Roma Primavera	2021	2025	14	1
55	Ebrima Darboe	(Italy)	CM	6 June 2001 (aged 21)	(Italy) Roma Primavera	2021	2025	11	0
77	Henrikh Mkhitaryan	(Armenia)	AM / LW	21 January 1989 (aged 33)	(England) Arsenal	2019	2022	117	29
Forwards
9	Tammy Abraham	(England)	CF	2 October 1997 (aged 24)	(England) Chelsea	2021	2026	53	27
11	Carles Pérez	(Spain)	RW / LW	16 February 1998 (aged 24)	(Spain) Barcelona	2020	2024	75	8
14	Eldor Shomurodov	(Uzbekistan)	CF	29 June 1995 (aged 27)	(Italy) Genoa	2021	2026	40	5
59	Nicola Zalewski	(Poland)	LW	23 January 2002 (aged 20)	(Italy) Roma Primavera	2021	2025	26	0
64	Felix Afena-Gyan	(Ghana)	CF	19 January 2003 (aged 19)	(Italy) Roma Primavera	2021	2026	22	2
92	Stephan El Shaarawy	(Italy)	LW	27 October 1992 (aged 29)	(China) Shanghai Shenhua	2021	2024	189	49

=== Other players under contract ===
Note: Flags indicate national team as defined under FIFA eligibility rules; some limited exceptions apply. Players may hold more than one non-FIFA nationality.

No.	Pos.	Nation	Player
18	DF	ITA	Davide Santon

=== Out on loan ===
Note: Flags indicate national team as defined under FIFA eligibility rules; some limited exceptions apply. Players may hold more than one non-FIFA nationality.

No.	Pos.	Nation	Player
—	GK	ESP	Pau López (at Marseille until 30 June 2022)
—	GK	SWE	Robin Olsen (at Sheffield United until 30 June 2022)
—	GK	ITA	Stefano Greco (at Potenza until 30 June 2022)
—	DF	ITA	Aboudramane Diaby (at Hellas Verona until 30 June 2022)
—	DF	ITA	Alessandro Florenzi (at Milan until 30 June 2022)
—	DF	ITA	Devid Bouah (at Teramo until 30 June 2022)
—	DF	ITA	Riccardo Calafiori (at Genoa until 30 June 2022)
—	DF	TUR	Mert Çetin (at Hellas Verona until 30 June 2022)
—	DF	FRA	William Bianda (at Nancy until 30 June 2022)

No.	Pos.	Nation	Player
—	MF	CRO	Ante Ćorić (at Zürich until 30 June 2022)
—	MF	ITA	Salvatore Pezzella (at Siena until 30 June 2022)
—	MF	ITA	Tommaso Milanese (at Alessandria until 30 June 2022)
—	FW	TUR	Cengiz Ünder (at Marseille until 30 June 2022)
—	FW	NED	Justin Kluivert (at Nice until 30 June 2022)
—	FW	ITA	Matteo Cancellieri (at Hellas Verona until 30 June 2022)
—	FW	ITA	Riccardo Ciervo (at Sampdoria until 30 June 2022)
—	FW	FRA	Ruben Providence (at Club Brugge until 30 June 2022)

== Transfers ==
=== In ===
No.	Pos.	Player	Transferred from	Fee	Date	Source
19	DF	(United States) Bryan Reynolds	(United States) FC Dallas	€6.75M (Note: Bought on loan obligation. MLS will retain the right to 15% of the profit on any deal – after factoring in the total amount already paid for the player at the time of his departure. Fee may eventually rise to €12.4 million.)	1 July 2021	
3	DF	(Brazil) Roger Ibañez	(Italy) Atalanta	€8M (Note: Bought on loan obligation. Atalanta will retain the right to 10% of any future transfer fee received for the player, should he be sold at any point prior to 30 June 2024. Fee may eventually rise to €10 million.)	1 July 2021	
1	GK	(Portugal) Rui Patrício	(England) Wolverhampton Wanderers	€11.5M (Note: Initial transfer fee. Includes undisclosed performance-related clauses.)	13 July 2021	
14	FW	(Uzbekistan) Eldor Shomurodov	(Italy) Genoa	€17.5M	2 August 2021	
5	DF	(Uruguay) Matías Viña	(Brazil) Palmeiras	€13M	8 August 2021	
9	FW	(England) Tammy Abraham	(England) Chelsea	€40M	17 August 2021	

==== Loans in ====
No.	Pos.	Player	Transferred from	Fee	Date	Source
15	MF	(England) Ainsley Maitland-Niles	(England) Arsenal	Loan	8 January 2022	
27	MF	(Portugal) Sérgio Oliveira	(Portugal) Porto	Loan	12 January 2022	

=== Out ===
No.	Pos.	Player	Transferred to	Fee	Date	Source
5	DF	(Brazil) Juan Jesus	(Italy) Napoli	Free	1 July 2021	
12	GK	(Italy) Simone Farelli	Unattached	Free	1 July 2021	
83	GK	(Italy) Antonio Mirante	Unattached	Free	1 July 2021	
33	DF	(Brazil) Bruno Peres	(Turkey) Trabzonspor	Free	1 July 2021	
–	FW	(Italy) Mirko Antonucci	(Italy) Cittadella	Undisclosed	30 July 2021	
9	FW	(Bosnia and Herzegovina) Edin Džeko	(Italy) Internazionale	Free	14 August 2021	
11	FW	(Spain) Pedro	(Italy) Lazio	Free	19 August 2021	
27	MF	(Argentina) Javier Pastore	(Spain) Elche	Free	30 August 2021	
15	MF	(France) Steven Nzonzi	(Qatar) Al-Rayyan	Free	28 September 2021	
20	DF	(Argentina) Federico Fazio	(Italy) Salernitana	Free	29 January 2022	

==== Loans out ====
No.	Pos.	Player	Transferred to	Fee	Date	Source
–	FW	(Turkey) Cengiz Ünder	(France) Marseille	Loan	4 July 2021	
13	GK	(Spain) Pau López	(France) Marseille	Loan	8 July 2021	
–	FW	(Netherlands) Justin Kluivert	(France) Nice	Loan	20 July 2021	
–	DF	(Italy) Alessandro Florenzi	(Italy) Milan	Loan	21 August 2021	
–	MF	(Croatia) Ante Ćorić	(Switzerland) Zürich	Loan	24 August 2021	
21	FW	(Spain) Borja Mayoral	(Spain) Getafe	Loan	13 January 2022	
8	MF	(Spain) Gonzalo Villar	(Spain) Getafe	Loan	13 January 2022	
13	DF	(Italy) Riccardo Calafiori	(Italy) Genoa	Loan	14 January 2022	
19	DF	(United States) Bryan Reynolds	(Belgium) Kortrijk	Loan	23 January 2022	

== Pre-season and friendlies ==
Win Draw Loss Fixtures

15 July 2021 Friendly	Roma (Italy)	10–0	(Italy) Montecatini	Rome, Italy
18:00 CEST (UTC+2)	C. Pérez 9'; Mancini 19'; B. Mayoral 34', 54', 88'; Calafiori 35'; Santi 40' (o.g.); Zaniolo 61' (pen.); Zalewski 80'; Diawara 86'	Report		Stadium: Trigoria training ground Attendance: 0 Referee: Alessandro Silvestri (Italy)

18 July 2021 Friendly	Roma (Italy)	2–0	(Italy) Ternana	Rome, Italy
18:00 CEST (UTC+2)	C. Pérez 10'; Kumbulla 53'	Report		Stadium: Trigoria training ground Attendance: 0 Referee: Mario Cascone (Italy)

21 July 2021 Friendly	Triestina (Italy)	0–1	(Italy) Roma	Trieste, Italy
19:30 CEST (UTC+2)		Report	Zalewski 49'	Stadium: Stadio Nereo Rocco; Referee: Nicolò Marini (Italy)

25 July 2021 Friendly	Roma (Italy)	5–2	(Hungary) Debrecen	Frosinone, Italy
19:00 CEST (UTC+2)	B. Mayoral 28'; Pellegrini 33'; Zaniolo 52'; Džeko 65', 80'	Report	Bárány 4'; Ugrai 53'	Stadium: Stadio Benito Stirpe; Referee: Davide Moriconi (Italy)

28 July 2021 Friendly	Porto (Portugal)	1–1	(Italy) Roma	Lagoa, Portugal
21:00 CEST (UTC+2)	B. Costa (yellow card) 69'; Vitinha 89'	Report	Mancini 56'; Mkhitaryan (yellow card) 69'	Stadium: Estádio Municipal da Bela Vista; Referee: Rui Soares (Portugal)

31 July 2021 Friendly	Roma (Italy)	0–0	(Spain) Sevilla	Algarve, Portugal
18:30 CEST (UTC+2)	Kumbulla (yellow card) 71'; Diawara (yellow card) 82'	Report	Gudelj (yellow card) 59' (yellow-red card) 66'	Stadium: Estádio Algarve; Referee: Nuno Almeida (Portugal)

4 August 2021 Friendly	Belenenses SAD (Portugal)	1–3	(Italy) Roma	Lagoa, Portugal
12:00 CEST (UTC+2)	Ndour 15'	Report	Džeko 20'; Zaniolo 56'; B. Mayoral 85'	Stadium: Estádio Municipal da Bela Vista; Referee: Pedro Ramalho (Portugal)

7 August 2021 Unbeatables Cup	Real Betis (Spain)	5–2	(Italy) Roma	Seville, Spain
22:00 CEST (UTC+2)	Rodri 4'; Fekir 30'; Moreno 58'; Tello 80'; Rober 83'	Report	Karsdorp (yellow card) 12' (yellow-red card) 78'; Shomurodov 27'; Pellegrini (yellow card) 37' (yellow-red card) 59'; Mkhitaryan (yellow card) 41'; Mancini 51', (yellow card) 58' (yellow-red card) 65'; Zaniolo (yellow card) 54'	Stadium: Estadio Benito Villamarín; Referee: Figueroa Vazquez (Spain)

14 August 2021 Friendly	Roma (Italy)	5–0	(Morocco) Raja	Rome, Italy
20:45 CEST (UTC+2)	Mkhitaryan (yellow card) 4', (goal) 48'; Shomurodov 17'; Mancini 20'; C. Pérez 85'; Mayoral 89'	Report	El Wardi (yellow card) 11'; Souboul (yellow card) 55'	Stadium: Stadio Olimpico

== Competitions ==
=== Overview ===
Competition	First match	Last match	Starting round	Final position	Record							
Competition	First match	Last match	Starting round	Final position	Pld	W	D	L	GF	GA	GD	Win %
Serie A	22 August 2021	20 May 2022	Matchday 1	6th	38	18	9	11	59	43	+16	47.37
Coppa Italia	20 January 2022	8 February 2022	Round of 16	Quarter-finals	2	1	0	1	3	3	+0	50.00
UEFA Europa Conference League	19 August 2021	25 May 2022	Play-off round	Winners	15	10	3	2	33	16	+17	66.67
Total					55	29	12	14	95	62	+33	52.73

Source: Soccerway

=== Serie A ===
==== League table ====
Pos	Team	Pld	W	D	L	GF	GA	GD	Pts	Qualification or relegation
4	Juventus	38	20	10	8	57	37	+20	70	Qualification for the Champions League group stage
5	Lazio	38	18	10	10	77	58	+19	64	Qualification for the Europa League group stage (Note: Since the winners of the 2021–22 Coppa Italia, Inter Milan, qualified for the Champions League, the Europa League berth awarded to the Coppa Italia winners was passed to the sixth-placed team, and the Europa Conference League berth awarded to the sixth-placed team was passed to the seventh-placed team.)
6	Roma	38	18	9	11	59	43	+16	63	Qualification for the Europa League group stage
7	Fiorentina	38	19	5	14	59	51	+8	62	Qualification for the Conference League play-off round
8	Atalanta	38	16	11	11	65	48	+17	59	

Source: Serie A
Rules for classification: 1) Points; 2) Head-to-head points; 3) Head-to-head goal difference; 4) Goal difference; 5) Goals scored; 6) Draw. (Note: Head-to-head record is used only after all the matches between the teams in question have been played)

==== Results summary ====
Overall								Home						Away					
Pld	W	D	L	GF	GA	GD	Pts	W	D	L	GF	GA	GD	W	D	L	GF	GA	GD
38	18	9	11	59	43	+16	63	10	6	3	26	16	+10	8	3	8	33	27	+6

Source: Serie A

==== Results by round ====
Round	1	2	3	4	5	6	7	8	9	10	11	12	13	14	15	16	17	18	19	20	21	22	23	24	25	26	27	28	29	30	31	32	33	34	35	36	37	38
Ground	H	A	H	A	H	A	H	A	H	A	H	A	A	H	A	H	H	A	H	A	H	H	A	H	A	H	A	H	A	H	A	H	A	A	H	A	H	A
Result	W	W	W	L	W	L	W	L	D	W	L	L	W	W	L	L	W	W	D	L	L	W	W	D	D	D	W	W	D	W	W	W	D	L	D	L	D	W
Position	3	3	1	4	4	4	4	4	4	4	4	6	5	5	5	7	6	5	6	7	8	7	6	7	7	8	6	5	6	5	5	5	5	5	5	6	6	6

Source: Serie A
A = Away; H = Home; W = Win; D = Draw; L = Loss

==== Matches ====
The league fixtures were announced on 14 July 2021.

22 August 2021 1	Roma	3–1	Fiorentina	Rome
20:45 CEST (UTC+2)	Pellegrini (yellow card) 13'; Mkhitaryan 26'; Zaniolo (yellow card) 44' (yellow-red card) 52'; Veretout 64', 79'	Report	Drągowski (red card) 17'; Bonaventura (yellow card) 45+3'; Pulgar (yellow card) 53'; Milenković 60'	Stadium: Stadio Olimpico; Attendance: 26,997; Referee: Luca Pairetto

29 August 2021 2	Salernitana	0–4	Roma	Salerno
20:45 CEST (UTC+2)	Bonazzoli (yellow card) 35'; Aya (yellow card) 50'	Report	Pérez (yellow card) 40'; Pellegrini 48', 79'; Veretout 52'; Mkhitaryan (yellow card) 67'; Abraham 69'	Stadium: Stadio Arechi; Attendance: 12,500; Referee: Rosario Abisso

12 September 2021 3	Roma	2–1	Sassuolo	Rome
20:45 CEST (UTC+2)	Cristante 37', (yellow card) 66'; Ibañez (yellow card) 43'; El Shaarawy 90+1'	Report	Chiricheș (yellow card) 36'; Đuričić 57'	Stadium: Stadio Olimpico; Attendance: 29,604; Referee: Simone Sozza

19 September 2021 4	Hellas Verona	3–2	Roma	Verona
18:00 CEST (UTC+2)	Faraoni (yellow card) 30', (goal) 63'; Barák 49', (yellow card) 51'; Caprari 54'; Hongla (yellow card) 83'; Casale (yellow card) 86'	Report	Veretout (yellow card) 18'; Pellegrini 36'; Ilić 58' (o.g.); Cristante (yellow card) 71'	Stadium: Stadio Marcantonio Bentegodi; Attendance: 10,148; Referee: Fabio Maresca

23 September 2021 5	Roma	1–0	Udinese	Rome
20:45 CEST (UTC+2)	Abraham 36'; Pellegrini (yellow card) 56' (yellow-red card) 90'; Cristante (yellow card) 65'; Calafiori (yellow card) 66'	Report	Walace (yellow card) 32'	Stadium: Stadio Olimpico; Attendance: 29,593; Referee: Antonio Rapuano

26 September 2021 6	Lazio	3–2	Roma	Rome
18:00 CEST (UTC+2)	Milinković-Savić 10'; Pedro 19'; Lucas (yellow card) 25'; Felipe Anderson 63'; Cataldi (yellow card) 87'	Report	Patrício (yellow card) 11'; Ibañez 41'; Cristante (yellow card) 45+2'; Viña (yellow card) 48'; Veretout 69' (pen.), (yellow card) 87'	Stadium: Stadio Olimpico; Attendance: 32,000; Referee: Marco Guida

3 October 2021 7	Roma	2–0	Empoli	Rome
18:00 CEST (UTC+2)	Pellegrini 42'; Mkhitaryan 48'; Mancini (yellow card) 57'; Zaniolo (yellow card) 85'	Report	Ricci (yellow card) 46'; Haas (yellow card) 56'; Stojanović (yellow card) 90+1'	Stadium: Stadio Olimpico; Attendance: 31,946; Referee: Giovanni Ayroldi

17 October 2021 8	Juventus	1–0	Roma	Turin
20:45 CEST (UTC+2)	Kean 16'; Szczęsny (yellow card) 42'; De Sciglio (yellow card) 49'; Danilo (yellow card) 88'	Report	Veretout (penalty missed) 44'; Abraham (yellow card) 45+3'; El Shaarawy (yellow card) 70'; Shomurodov (yellow card) 85'; Mancini (yellow card) 89'; Karsdorp (yellow card) 90+3'	Stadium: Juventus Stadium; Attendance: 20,239; Referee: Daniele Orsato

24 October 2021 9	Roma	0–0	Napoli	Rome
18:00 CEST (UTC+2)	Abraham (yellow card) 30'; Karsdorp (yellow card) 90+4'; Veretout (yellow card) 90+4'; Mancini (yellow card) 90+5'	Report	Mertens (yellow card) 90+5'	Stadium: Stadio Olimpico; Attendance: 47,801; Referee: Davide Massa

27 October 2021 10	Cagliari	1–2	Roma	Cagliari
20:45 CEST (UTC+2)	Pavoletti 52'; João Pedro (yellow card) 73'; Lykogiannis (yellow card) 77'; Bellanova (yellow card) 87'	Report	Zaniolo (yellow card) 38'; Ibañez 71'; Pellegrini 78', (yellow card) 79'; Abraham (yellow card) 80'; Calafiori (yellow card) 83'	Stadium: Sardegna Arena; Attendance: 8,547; Referee: Ivano Pezzuto

31 October 2021 11	Roma	1–2	Milan	Rome
20:45 CET (UTC+1)	Zaniolo (yellow card) 7'; Karsdorp (yellow card) 24'; Mancini (yellow card) 49'; El Shaarawy 90+3'; Veretout (yellow card) 90+7'	Report	Ibrahimović 26', (yellow card) 27'; Hernandez (yellow card) 41' (yellow-red card) 66'; Kessié 57' (pen.), (yellow card) 81'; Tomori (yellow card) 65'; Calabria (yellow card) 67'; Giroud (yellow card) 77'	Stadium: Stadio Olimpico; Attendance: 51,001; Referee: Fabio Maresca

7 November 2021 12	Venezia	3–2	Roma	Ferrara
12:30 CET (UTC+1)	Caldara 3'; Kiyine (yellow card) 47'; Aramu 65' (pen.); Okereke 74'; Romero (yellow card) 90+3'	Report	Karsdorp (yellow card) 16'; Shomurodov 43'; Abraham 45+2', (yellow card) 78'	Stadium: Stadio Paolo Mazza; Attendance: 8,263; Referee: Gianluca Aureliano

21 November 2021 13	Genoa	0–2	Roma	Genoa
20:45 CET (UTC+1)	Cambiaso (yellow card) 32'; Badelj (yellow card) 54'; Sabelli (yellow card) 78'	Report	Veretout (yellow card) 40'; Afena-Gyan 82', 90+4', (yellow card) 90'	Stadium: Stadio Luigi Ferraris; Attendance: 14,667; Referee: Massimiliano Irrati

28 November 2021 14	Roma	1–0	Torino	Rome
18:00 CET (UTC+1)	Abraham 32'; Ibañez (yellow card) 90+2'; Kumbulla (yellow card) 90+4'	Report	Zima (yellow card) 54'	Stadium: Stadio Olimpico; Attendance: 46,728; Referee: Daniele Chiffi

1 December 2021 15	Bologna	1–0	Roma	Bologna
18:30 CET (UTC+1)	Svanberg 35'; Soriano (yellow card) 38'; Skorupski (yellow card) 88'; Sansone (yellow card) 90+2'	Report	Abraham (yellow card) 45+1'; Pérez (yellow card) 59'; Zaniolo (yellow card) 72'; Karsdorp (yellow card) 90+2'	Stadium: Stadio Renato Dall'Ara; Attendance: 15,780; Referee: Luca Pairetto

4 December 2021 16	Roma	0–3	Internazionale	Rome
18:00 CET (UTC+1)	Ibañez (yellow card) 37'; Mancini (yellow card) 63'; Zaniolo (yellow card) 75'	Report	Çalhanoğlu 15'; Džeko 24'; Dumfries 39'; Barella (yellow card) 47'	Stadium: Stadio Olimpico; Attendance: 51,185; Referee: Marco Di Bello

13 December 2021 17	Roma	2–0	Spezia	Rome
20:45 CET (UTC+1)	Smalling 6'; Viña (yellow card) 54'; Ibañez 56'; Kumbulla (yellow card) 65'; Afena-Gyan (yellow card) 70' (yellow-red card) 90+3'	Report	Gyasi (yellow card) 90+2'	Stadium: Stadio Olimpico; Attendance: 44,844; Referee: Alessandro Prontera

18 December 2021 18	Atalanta	1–4	Roma	Bergamo
15:00 CET (UTC+1)	De Roon (yellow card) 8'; Cristante 45+1' (o.g.)	Report	Abraham 1', 82'; Zaniolo (yellow card) 9', (goal) 27'; Ibañez 50'; Smalling 72'; Mancini (yellow card) 74'	Stadium: Gewiss Stadium; Attendance: 14,469; Referee: Massimiliano Irrati

22 December 2021 19	Roma	1–1	Sampdoria	Rome
18:30 CET (UTC+1)	Shomurodov 72'	Report	Bereszyński (yellow card) 44'; Falcone (yellow card) 60'; Askildsen (yellow card) 61'; Gabbiadini 80'	Stadium: Stadio Olimpico; Attendance: 49,400; Referee: Piero Giacomelli

6 January 2022 20	Milan	3–1	Roma	Milan
18:30 CET (UTC+1)	Giroud 8' (pen.); Messias 17'; Hernandez (yellow card) 44'; Krunić (yellow card) 56'; Leão 82'; Ibrahimović (penalty missed) 90+4'	Report	Abraham (yellow card) 7', (goal) 40'; Zaniolo (yellow card) 18'; Karsdorp (yellow card) 44' (yellow-red card) 74'; Cristante (yellow card) 85'; Mancini (yellow card) 85' (yellow-red card) 90+3'	Stadium: San Siro; Attendance: 35,870; Referee: Daniele Chiffi

9 January 2022 21	Roma	3–4	Juventus	Rome
18:30 CET (UTC+1)	Abraham 11'; Mkhitaryan 48'; Veretout (yellow card) 50'; Ibañez (yellow card) 51'; Pellegrini 53', (penalty missed) 83	Report	Dybala 18'; Cuadrado (yellow card) 45+3'; De Ligt (yellow card) 52' (yellow-red card) 81'; Locatelli (yellow card) 65', (goal) 70'; Kulusevski 72'; De Sciglio 77'	Stadium: Stadio Olimpico; Attendance: 33,178; Referee: Davide Massa

16 January 2022 22	Roma	1–0	Cagliari	Rome
18:00 CET (UTC+1)	Oliveira (yellow card) 23', (goal) 33' (pen.); Mancini (yellow card) 39'; Afena-Gyan (yellow card) 58'	Report	Pavoletti (yellow card) 25'; Carboni (yellow card) 27'; Dalbert (yellow card) 32'; Altare (yellow card) 70'	Stadium: Stadio Olimpico; Attendance: 5,000; Referee: Lorenzo Maggioni

23 January 2022 23	Empoli	2–4	Roma	Empoli
18:00 CET (UTC+1)	Pinamonti 55'; Tonelli (yellow card) 64'; Bajrami 72'; Benassi (yellow card) 83'	Report	Abraham 24', 33'; Oliveira 35'; Zaniolo 37'; Mancini (yellow card) 52'; Cristante (yellow card) 85'	Stadium: Stadio Carlo Castellani; Attendance: 4,920; Referee: Michael Fabbri

5 February 2022 24	Roma	0–0	Genoa	Rome
15:00 CET (UTC+1)	Mancini (yellow card) 35'; Abraham (yellow card) 90+4'; Zaniolo (red card) 90+5'	Report	Vanheusden (yellow card) 25'; Østigård (red card) 69'; Vásquez (yellow card) 79'	Stadium: Stadio Olimpico; Attendance: 29,863; Referee: Rosario Abisso

13 February 2022 25	Sassuolo	2–2	Roma	Reggio Emilia
18:00 CET (UTC+1)	Ferrari (yellow card) 19' (yellow-red card) 78'; Berardi (yellow card) 45+1'; Lopez (yellow card) 45+2'; Smalling 47' (o.g.); Traorè 73'	Report	Mancini (yellow card) 21'; Abraham 45+1' (pen.); Kumbulla (yellow card) 83'; Cristante 90+4'	Stadium: Mapei Stadium – Città del Tricolore; Attendance: 9,282; Referee: Marco Guida

19 February 2022 26	Roma	2–2	Hellas Verona	Rome
18:00 CET (UTC+1)	Pellegrini (yellow card) 38'; Oliveira (yellow card) 39'; Volpato 65'; Karsdorp (yellow card) 69'; Bove 84'	Report	Barák 5'; Casale (yellow card) 16'; Tameze 20'; Günter (yellow card) 89'	Stadium: Stadio Olimpico; Attendance: 34,777; Referee: Luca Pairetto

27 February 2022 27	Spezia	0–1	Roma	La Spezia
18:05 CET (UTC+1)	Agudelo (yellow card) 30'; Amian (yellow card) 39' (yellow-red card) 45'; Kiwior (yellow card) 86'; Maggiore (yellow card) 90+7'	Report	Mancini (yellow card) 45+3'; Kumbulla (yellow card) 64'; Zaniolo (yellow card) 90+5'; Abraham 90+9' (pen.)	Stadium: Stadio Alberto Picco; Attendance: 8,107; Referee: Michael Fabbri

5 March 2022 28	Roma	1–0	Atalanta	Rome
18:00 CET (UTC+1)	Cristante (yellow card) 9'; Abraham (yellow card) 20', (goal) 32'; Mkhitaryan (yellow card) 66' (yellow-red card) 90+6'; Kumbulla (yellow card) 69'; Ibañez (yellow card) 85'	Report	Malinovskyi (yellow card) 78'; Demiral (yellow card) 86'; De Roon (yellow card) 90+4' (yellow-red card) 90+4'	Stadium: Stadio Olimpico; Attendance: 42,303; Referee: Davide Massa

13 March 2022 29	Udinese	1–1	Roma	Udine
18:00 CET (UTC+1)	Molina 15'; Deulofeu (yellow card) 26'; Makengo (yellow card) 86'; Becão (yellow card) 90+4'	Report	Afena-Gyan (yellow card) 70'; Ibañez (yellow card) 88'; Pellegrini 90+4' (pen.)	Stadium: Stadio Friuli; Attendance: 15,114; Referee: Marco Di Bello

20 March 2022 30	Roma	3–0	Lazio	Rome
18:00 CET (UTC+1)	Abraham 1', 22'; Pellegrini 40'; Karsdorp (yellow card) 48'; Mancini (yellow card) 53'; Zalewski (yellow card) 73'; Oliveira (yellow card) 78'	Report	Pedro (yellow card) 43'; Patric (yellow card) 43'; Lucas (yellow card) 61'	Stadium: Stadio Olimpico; Attendance: 51,932; Referee: Massimiliano Irrati

3 April 2022 31	Sampdoria	0–1	Roma	Genoa
18:00 CEST (UTC+2)	Bereszyński (yellow card) 46'; Sabiri (yellow card) 71'	Report	Ibañez (yellow card) 9'; Mkhitaryan 27'; Oliveira (yellow card) 48'; Pellegrini (yellow card) 90+2'	Stadium: Stadio Luigi Ferraris; Attendance: 16,465; Referee: Gianluca Manganiello

10 April 2022 32	Roma	2–1	Salernitana	Rome
18:00 CEST (UTC+2)	Kumbulla (yellow card) 21'; Cristante (yellow card) 54'; Mkhitaryan (yellow card) 80'; Pérez 82'; Smalling 85'; Abraham (yellow card) 90'; Patrício (yellow card) 90+3'	Report	Bohinen (yellow card) 13'; Radovanović 22', (yellow card) 90'; Đurić (yellow card) 30'; Gyömbér (yellow card) 41'; Ribéry (yellow card) 67'; Sepe (yellow card) 71'; Kastanos (yellow card) 76'; Zortea (yellow card) 81'	Stadium: Stadio Olimpico; Attendance: 64,266; Referee: Manuel Volpi

18 April 2022 33	Napoli	1–1	Roma	Naples
19:00 CEST (UTC+2)	Insigne 11' (pen.), (yellow card) 64'; Koulibaly (yellow card) 37'; Zanoli (yellow card) 52'; Lozano (yellow card) 62'	Report	Cristante (yellow card) 17'; Zaniolo (yellow card) 71'; Fuzato (red card) 80'; El Shaarawy 90+1'	Stadium: Stadio Diego Armando Maradona; Attendance: 41,822; Referee: Marco Di Bello

23 April 2022 34	Internazionale	3–1	Roma	Milan
18:00 CEST (UTC+2)	Dumfries 30'; Brozović 40', (yellow card) 45+1'; Martínez 52'; Çalhanoğlu (yellow card) 87'	Report	Mancini (yellow card) 36'; Oliveira (yellow card) 79'; Mkhitaryan 85'	Stadium: San Siro; Attendance: 74,947; Referee: Simone Sozza

1 May 2022 35	Roma	0–0	Bologna	Rome
20:45 CEST (UTC+2)		Report	Medel (yellow card) 41'	Stadium: Stadio Olimpico; Attendance: 62,988; Referee: Michael Fabbri

9 May 2022 36	Fiorentina	2–0	Roma	Florence
20:45 CEST (UTC+2)	González 5' (pen.); Bonaventura 11', (yellow card) 28'; Amrabat (yellow card) 19'; Duncan (yellow card) 49'	Report	Mancini (yellow card) 24'	Stadium: Stadio Artemio Franchi; Attendance: 29,580; Referee: Marco Guida

14 May 2022 37	Roma	1–1	Venezia	Rome
20:45 CEST (UTC+2)	Spinazzola (yellow card) 39'; Pellegrini (yellow card) 68'; Shomurodov 76'	Report	Okereke 1', (yellow card) 61'; Kiyine (yellow card) 18', (red card) 32'; Vacca (yellow card) 26'; Ampadu (yellow card) 79'; Peretz (yellow card) 87'	Stadium: Stadio Olimpico; Attendance: 63,243; Referee: Simone Sozza

20 May 2022 38	Torino	0–3	Roma	Turin
20:45 CEST (UTC+2)	Ansaldi (yellow card) 21'; Buongiorno (yellow card) 78'	Report	Ibañez (yellow card) 20'; Abraham 33', 42' (pen.); Shomurodov (yellow card) 76'; Pellegrini 78' (pen.)	Stadium: Stadio Olimpico Grande Torino; Attendance: 16,730; Referee: Massimiliano Irrati

=== Coppa Italia ===
20 January 2022 Round of 16	Roma	3–1	Lecce	Rome
21:00 CET (UTC+1)	Afena-Gyan (yellow card) 38'; Kumbulla 40'; Abraham 54', (yellow card) 76'; Ibañez (yellow card) 71'; Shomurodov 81'	Report	Listkowski (yellow card) 12'; Calabresi 14'; Helgason (yellow card) 44'; Di Mariano (yellow card) 45+1'; Gargiulo (yellow card) 60' (yellow-red card) 62'	Stadium: Stadio Olimpico; Attendance: 5,000; Referee: Manuel Volpi

8 February 2022 Quarter-finals	Internazionale	2–0	Roma	Milan
21:00 CET (UTC+1)	Džeko 1'; Sánchez 68'	Report	Zaniolo (yellow card) 37'; Mancini (yellow card) 38'	Stadium: San Siro; Attendance: 38,000; Referee: Marco Di Bello

=== UEFA Europa Conference League ===
==== Play-off round ====
The draw for the play-off round was held on 2 August.

19 August 2021 First leg	Trabzonspor (Turkey)	1–2	(Italy) Roma	Trabzon, Turkey
19:00 CEST (UTC+3)	Peres (yellow card) 14'; Ié (yellow card) 51'; Cornelius 64'	Report	Viña (yellow card) 15'; Pellegrini 55'; Shomurodov 81'	Stadium: Şenol Güneş Sports Complex; Attendance: 12,870; Referee: Matej Jug (Slovenia)

26 August 2021 Second leg	Roma (Italy)	3–0 (5–1 agg.)	(Turkey) Trabzonspor	Rome, Italy
19:00 CEST (UTC+2)	Cristante 20'; Veretout (yellow card) 38'; Zaniolo 65'; El Sharaawy 84'; Mancini (yellow card) 90+1'	Report	Siopis (yellow card) 39'; Ié (yellow card) 85'; Djaniny (yellow card) 90+1'	Stadium: Stadio Olimpico; Attendance: 25,906; Referee: Srđan Jovanović (Serbia)

==== Group stage ====
The draw for the group stage was held on 27 August 2021.

Pos	Team	Pld	W	D	L	GF	GA	GD	Pts	Qualification	ROM	BOD	ZOR	CSS
1	(Italy) Roma	6	4	1	1	18	11	+7	13	Advance to round of 16	—	2–2	4–0	5–1
2	(Norway) Bodø/Glimt	6	3	3	0	14	5	+9	12	Advance to knockout round play-offs	6–1	—	3–1	2–0
3	(Ukraine) Zorya Luhansk	6	2	1	3	5	11	−6	7		0–3	1–1	—	2–0
4	(Bulgaria) CSKA Sofia	6	0	1	5	3	13	−10	1		2–3	0–0	0–1	—

Source: UEFA
Rules for classification: Group stage tiebreakers

16 September 2021 1	Roma (Italy)	5–1	(Bulgaria) CSKA Sofia	Rome, Italy
21:00 CEST (UTC+2)	Pellegrini 25', 62'; El Shaarawy 38'; Mancini 82'; Abraham 84'	Report	Carey 10'; Wildschut (yellow card) 67' (yellow-red card) 80'; Lam (yellow card) 90'	Stadium: Stadio Olimpico; Attendance: 29,876; Referee: Glenn Nyberg (Sweden)

30 September 2021 2	Zorya Luhansk (Ukraine)	0–3	(Italy) Roma	Zaporizhia, Ukraine
19:45 EEST (UTC+3)		Report	El Shaarawy 7'; Smalling 66'; Abraham 68'; Kumbulla (yellow card) 81'; Patrício (yellow card) 83'	Stadium: Zaporizhzhya City Stadium; Attendance: 7,622; Referee: Luís Godinho (Portugal)
Note: Zorya Luhansk played their home matches at Slavutych-Arena in Zaporizhzhia, instead of their regular stadium Avanhard Stadium in Luhansk, due to the war conditions in Eastern Ukraine.

21 October 2021 3	Bodø/Glimt (Norway)	6–1	(Italy) Roma	Bodø, Norway
18:45 CEST (UTC+2)	Botheim 8', 52'; Berg 20'; Lode (yellow card) 37'; Solbakken 71', 80'; Pellegrino 78'	Report	Pérez 28'; Darboe (yellow card) 33'	Stadium: Aspmyra Stadion; Attendance: 5,652; Referee: Ali Palabıyık (Turkey)

4 November 2021 4	Roma (Italy)	2–2	(Norway) Bodø/Glimt	Rome, Italy
21:00 CET (UTC+1)	El Shaarawy 54'; Cristante (yellow card) 75'; Ibañez (yellow card) 78', (goal) 84'	Report	Solbakken 45+1', (yellow card) 80'; Botheim 65'; Khaykin (yellow card) 75'; Moe (yellow card) 87'	Stadium: Stadio Olimpico; Attendance: 41,031; Referee: Anastasios Papapetrou (Greece)

25 November 2021 5	Roma (Italy)	4–0	(Ukraine) Zorya Luhansk	Rome, Italy
21:00 CET (UTC+1)	Pérez 15'; Zaniolo 33'; Veretout (penalty missed) 41'; Abraham 46', 75'; Karsdorp (yellow card) 90+1'; Mancini (yellow card) 90+1'	Report		Stadium: Stadio Olimpico; Attendance: 24,000; Referee: István Kovács (Romania)

9 December 2021 6	CSKA Sofia (Bulgaria)	2–3	(Italy) Roma	Sofia, Bulgaria
19:45 EET (UTC+2)	Vion (yellow card) 45'; Geferson (yellow card) 71'; Čataković 75'; Wildschut 90+3'	Report	Abraham 15', 53'; Bove (yellow card) 24'; Mancini (yellow card) 32'; Mayoral 34'; Kumbulla (yellow card) 60'	Stadium: Vasil Levski National Stadium; Attendance: 4,640; Referee: Nick Walsh (Scotland)

==== Knockout phase ====
===== Round of 16 =====
The round of 16 draw was held on 25 February 2022.

10 March 2022 First leg	Vitesse (Netherlands)	0–1	(Italy) Roma	Arnhem, Netherlands
18:45 CET (UTC+1)	Oroz (yellow card) 33'	Report	Viña (yellow card) 7'; Oliveira 45+1', (yellow card) 70' (yellow-red card) 79'; Mancini (yellow card) 86'	Stadium: GelreDome; Attendance: 24,022; Referee: Paweł Raczkowski (Poland)

17 March 2022 Second leg	Roma (Italy)	1–1 (2–1 agg.)	(Netherlands) Vitesse	Rome, Italy
21:00 CET (UTC+1)	Ibañez (yellow card) 18'; Zaniolo (yellow card) 72'; El Shaarawy (yellow card) 89'; Abraham 90+1'	Report	Grbić (yellow card) 42'; Rasmussen (yellow card) 58'; Wittek 62'	Stadium: Stadio Olimpico; Attendance: 40,435; Referee: Radu Petrescu (Romania)

===== Quarter-finals =====
The draw for the quarter-finals was held on 18 March 2022.

7 April 2022 First leg	Bodø/Glimt (Norway)	2–1	(Italy) Roma	Bodø, Norway
21:00 CEST (UTC+2)	Saltnes 56'; Vetlesen 89'	Report	Cristante (yellow card) 18'; Pellegrini 43'; Viña (yellow card) 88'	Stadium: Aspmyra Stadion; Attendance: 7,739; Referee: Serdar Gözübüyük (Netherlands)

14 April 2022 Second leg	Roma (Italy)	4–0 (5–2 agg.)	(Norway) Bodø/Glimt	Rome, Italy
21:00 CEST (UTC+2)	Abraham 5'; Zaniolo 23', 29', 49'; Mancini (yellow card) 54'	Report		Stadium: Stadio Olimpico; Attendance: 61,942; Referee: José María Sánchez Martínez (Spain)

===== Semi-finals =====
The draw for the semi-finals was held on 18 March 2022, after the quarter-final draw.

28 April 2022 First leg	Leicester City (England)	1–1	(Italy) Roma	Leicester, England
20:00 BST (UTC+1)	Dewsbury-Hall (yellow card) 26'; Vardy (yellow card) 59'; Mancini 67' (o.g.)	Report	Abraham (yellow card) 8'; Pellegrini 15'; Zaniolo (yellow card) 63'	Stadium: King Power Stadium; Attendance: 31,659; Referee: Carlos del Cerro Grande (Spain)

5 May 2022 Second leg	Roma (Italy)	1–0 (2–1 agg.)	(England) Leicester City	Rome, Italy
21:00 CEST (UTC+2)	Abraham 11'; Mancini (yellow card) 41'; Karsdorp (yellow card) 87'	Report	Fofana (yellow card) 68'	Stadium: Stadio Olimpico; Attendance: 63,940; Referee: Srđan Jovanović (Serbia)

===== Final =====
25 May 2022 Final	Roma (Italy)	1–0	(Netherlands) Feyenoord	Tirana, Albania
21:00 CEST (UTC+2)	Zaniolo 32'; Pellegrini (yellow card) 37'; Zalewski (yellow card) 67'; Patrício (yellow card) 84'; Spinazzola (yellow card) 90+4'	Report	Trauner (yellow card) 25'	Stadium: Arena Kombëtare; Attendance: 19,597; Referee: István Kovács (Romania)

== Statistics ==
=== Appearances and goals ===
No.	Pos	Nat	Player	Total		Serie A		Coppa Italia		Europa Conference League	
No.	Pos	Nat	Player	Apps	Goals	Apps	Goals	Apps	Goals	Apps	Goals
Goalkeepers
1	GK	(Portugal) POR	Rui Patrício	54	0	38	0	2	0	14	0
63	GK	(Italy) ITA	Pietro Boer	0	0	0	0	0	0	0	0
87	GK	(Brazil) BRA	Daniel Fuzato	1	0	0	0	0	0	1	0
Defenders
2	DF	(Netherlands) NED	Rick Karsdorp	51	1	32+4	1	2	0	11+2	0
3	DF	(Brazil) BRA	Roger Ibañez	51	4	32+2	3	2	0	13+2	1
5	DF	(Uruguay) URU	Matías Viña	37	0	18+8	0	1+1	0	5+4	0
6	DF	(England) ENG	Chris Smalling	38	4	23+4	3	1	0	8+2	1
23	DF	(Italy) ITA	Gianluca Mancini	46	1	33	0	1	0	11+1	1
24	DF	(Albania) ALB	Marash Kumbulla	28	1	13+4	1	1+1	0	7+2	0
37	DF	(Italy) ITA	Leonardo Spinazzola	4	0	2+1	0	0	0	0+1	0
58	DF	(Italy) ITA	Filippo Missori	1	0	0	0	0	0	0+1	0
65	DF	(Italy) ITA	Filippo Tripi	0	0	0	0	0	0	0	0
75	DF	(Greece) GRE	Dimitrios Keramitsis	1	0	0+1	0	0	0	0	0
Midfielders
4	MF	(Italy) ITA	Bryan Cristante	50	3	29+5	2	1+1	0	10+4	1
7	MF	(Italy) ITA	Lorenzo Pellegrini	41	14	27+1	9	0+1	0	10+2	5
15	MF	(England) ENG	Ainsley Maitland-Niles	12	0	7+1	0	1	0	2+1	0
17	MF	(France) FRA	Jordan Veretout	50	4	26+10	4	2	0	7+5	0
22	MF	(Italy) ITA	Nicolò Zaniolo	42	8	23+5	2	1+1	0	10+2	6
27	MF	(Portugal) POR	Sérgio Oliveira	22	3	13+1	2	2	0	3+3	1
42	MF	(Guinea) GUI	Amadou Diawara	8	0	2+2	0	0	0	2+2	0
52	MF	(Italy) ITA	Edoardo Bove	12	1	0+11	1	0	0	0+1	0
55	MF	(The Gambia) GAM	Ebrima Darboe	4	0	1	0	0	0	3	0
59	MF	(Poland) POL	Nicola Zalewski	24	0	9+7	0	0+1	0	5+2	0
62	MF	(Italy) ITA	Cristian Volpato	3	1	1+2	1	0	0	0	0
77	MF	(Armenia) ARM	Henrikh Mkhitaryan	44	5	29+2	5	1+1	0	10+1	0
Forwards
9	FW	(England) ENG	Tammy Abraham	53	27	36+1	17	2	1	11+3	9
11	FW	(Spain) ESP	Carles Pérez	28	3	3+16	1	1	0	4+4	2
14	FW	(Uzbekistan) UZB	Eldor Shomurodov	40	5	5+23	3	0+1	1	3+8	1
64	FW	(Ghana) GHA	Felix Afena-Gyan	22	2	6+11	2	1+1	0	0+3	0
92	FW	(Italy) ITA	Stephan El Shaarawy	36	7	8+19	3	0+1	0	5+3	4
Players transferred out during the season
8	MF	(Spain) ESP	Gonzalo Villar	5	0	0	0	0	0	2+3	0
13	DF	(Italy) ITA	Riccardo Calafiori	9	0	2+4	0	0	0	3	0
19	DF	(United States) USA	Bryan Reynolds	3	0	0+1	0	0	0	1+1	0
21	FW	(Spain) ESP	Borja Mayoral	10	1	1+4	0	0	0	1+4	1

Last updated: 25 May 2022
Source: Competitions

=== Goalscorers ===
Rank	No.	Pos.	Player	Serie A	Coppa Italia	Europa Conference League	Total
1	9	FW	(England) Tammy Abraham	17	1	9	27
2	7	MF	(Italy) Lorenzo Pellegrini	9	0	5	14
3	22	MF	(Italy) Nicolò Zaniolo	2	0	6	8
4	92	FW	(Italy) Stephan El Sharaawy	3	0	4	7
5	77	MF	(Armenia) Henrikh Mkhitaryan	5	0	0	5
5	14	FW	(Uzbekistan) Eldor Shomurodov	3	1	1	5
7	17	MF	(France) Jordan Veretout	4	0	0	4
7	3	DF	(Brazil) Roger Ibañez	3	0	1	4
7	6	DF	(England) Chris Smalling	3	0	1	4
10	4	MF	(Italy) Bryan Cristante	2	0	1	3
10	27	MF	(Portugal) Sérgio Oliveira	2	0	1	3
10	11	FW	(Spain) Carles Pérez	1	0	2	3
13	64	FW	(Ghana) Felix Afena-Gyan	2	0	0	2
14	23	DF	(Italy) Gianluca Mancini	0	0	1	1
14	24	DF	(Albania) Marash Kumbulla	0	1	0	1
14	52	MF	(Italy) Edoardo Bove	1	0	0	1
14	62	MF	(Italy) Cristian Volpato	1	0	0	1
14	21	FW	(Spain) Borja Mayoral	0	0	1	1
Own goals				1	0	0	1
Totals				59	3	33	95
