= Stephan El Shaarawy =

Italian footballer (born 1992)

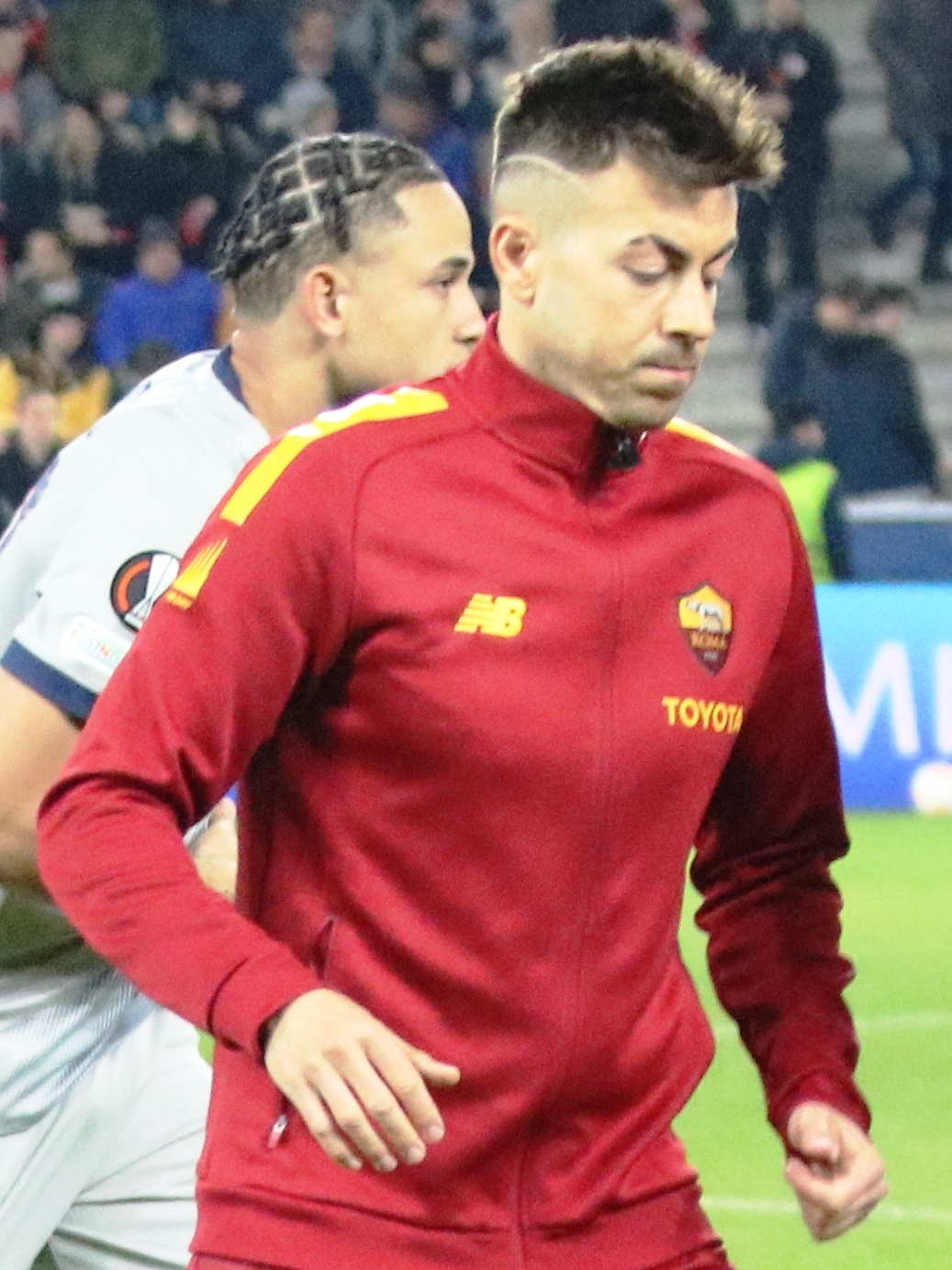
- El Shaarawy with Roma in 2023

Personal information
- Full name: Stephan Kareem El Shaarawy
- Date of birth: 27 October 1992 (age 34)
- Place of birth: Savona, Italy
- Height: 1.78 m (5 ft 10 in)
- Position: Left winger

Team information
- Current team: Genoa
- Number: 92

Youth career
- 2001–2006: Legino
- 2006–2008: Genoa

Senior career*
Years	Team	Apps	(Gls)
2008–2011	Genoa	3	(0)
2010–2011	→ Padova (loan)	29	(9)
2011–2016	AC Milan	83	(21)
2015–2016	→ Monaco (loan)	15	(0)
2016	→ Roma (loan)	16	(8)
2016–2019	Roma	93	(26)
2019–2021	Shanghai Shenhua	16	(1)
2021–2026	Roma	150	(18)
2026–	Genoa	7	(0)

International career^{‡}
2008	Italy U16	8	(4)
2008–2009	Italy U17	15	(2)
2010	Italy U18	3	(1)
2010–2011	Italy U19	5	(1)
2011–2012	Italy U21	5	(3)
2012–2024	Italy	32	(7)
Medal record
Men's Football
Representing Italy
FIFA Confederations Cup
Third place	2013
- * Club domestic league appearances and goals as of 23:39, 8 November 2026 (UTC) ‡ National team caps and goals as of 29 June 2024

Stephan Kareem El Shaarawy (Arabic: ستيفان كريم الشعراوي; born 27 October 1992) is an Italian professional footballer who plays as a left winger for Serie A club Genoa and the Italy national team. He is nicknamed Il Faraone (The Pharaoh), as his father is Egyptian.

El Shaarawy began his career at Genoa, and was signed by Milan in 2011 after a successful loan at Padova. Frequently regarded as one of the most promising youngsters of his generation, El Shaarawy had his breakthrough in the first half of the 2012–13 season. Following several long periods out of action due to injuries, he spent the 2015–16 season on loan with Monaco and subsequently Roma, signing permanently for the latter club at the end of the season. In 2019, he transferred to Chinese club Shanghai Greenland Shenhua, before making a return to Roma eighteen months later.

Internationally, El Shaarawy represented Italy from under-16 to under-21 levels. In August 2012, he made his debut for the senior team in a friendly against England, and in November of that year scored his first international goal against France. He represented Italy at the 2013 FIFA Confederations Cup, where they finished in third place, and at UEFA Euro 2016.

== Early life ==
Stephan El Shaarawy was born on 27 October 1992 in the Italian comune Savona, to an Egyptian father and a Swiss-Italian mother.

== Club career ==
=== Genoa ===
El Shaarawy started his youth career with Genoa at the age of fourteen.

On 21 December 2008, when he was sixteen years old, El Shaarawy made his first team debut, playing ten minutes in a Serie A away match against Chievo; he is currently the eighth youngest player in the history of Serie A to have made his debut in the Italian top division. It was his only appearance of the season despite making the bench several times.

==== Loan to Padova ====
In June 2010, El Shaarawy was loaned out to Padova for the 2010–11 Serie B season. He quickly emerged as a key element for the team, leading the Venetian club to the promotion play-off finals, where they then lost to Novara. For his performances with Padova, El Shaarawy would be awarded the 2011 Serie B Footballer of the Year.

=== AC Milan ===
==== 2011–12: Progression to the first team ====
On 25 June 2011, El Shaarawy signed for Serie A giants Milan for a €20 million transfer fee (€10 million plus Alexander Merkel). He made his debut for the club on 18 September 2011 at the Stadio San Paolo, in a 3–1 league loss to Napoli. Three days later, after coming on as a substitute for the injured Alexandre Pato, he scored his first goal for Milan, earning his side a 1–1 draw at home against Udinese.

In his first six months at Milan, El Shaarawy made a total of seven appearances, leading to reports in the media that he may be loaned out for more playing time to help his progression. However a decision was then made between vice-president Adriano Galliani, coach Massimiliano Allegri and himself to stay at the club for the near future. It was then that El Shaarawy's performances for Milan began to improve, leading him to become one of the most highly rated youngsters in Italy. On 8 February 2012, El Shaarawy scored in a 1–2 loss against Juventus in the first leg of Milan's Coppa Italia semi-final. Three days later, he scored a crucial winner against Udinese.

==== 2012–13: Breakthrough season ====
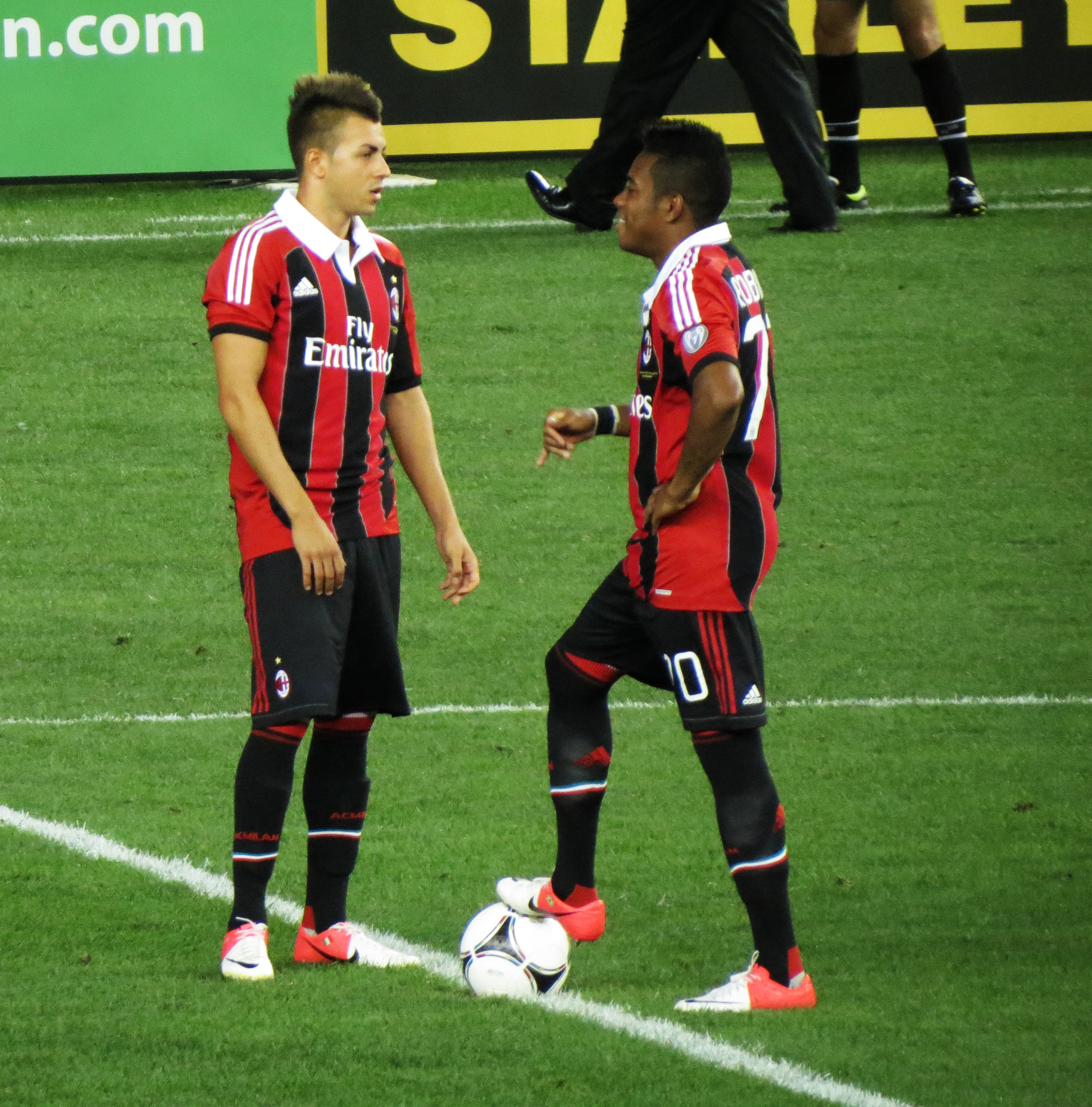
El Shaarawy (left) and Robinho preparing to kick off for AC Milan in 2012

On 25 July 2012, El Shaarawy signed a new five-year contract with Milan. On 3 October 2012, he scored his first UEFA Champions League goal against Zenit Saint Petersburg, becoming Milan's youngest ever goalscorer in the competition at the age of 19 years and 342 days. He then got two goals against Napoli on 18 November to help Milan equalise after being 2–0 down and save them from losing an important game. El Shaarawy continued his fine form by scoring another brace in a 3–1 away win against Catania two weeks later. He added a further goal in a 4–2 win at Torino on 9 December, and scored again in a 4–1 victory against Pescara in the following match, earning Milan a fourth consecutive win to help them rise up in the table. He finished the first half of the season as Serie A's top scorer with fourteen goals, and also as Milan's top scorer in all competitions with sixteen.

In 2012, El Shaarawy was named one of the top players born after 1991 by Don Balón, and was listed 52nd in The Guardian's list of the best footballers in the world. He also won the league's Best Young Revelation award, given to the most promising youngster in Serie A.

On 28 February 2013, El Shaarawy ended speculation regarding his future by extending his contract for a further season, running until June 2018. In the second half of the 2012–13 campaign, he struggled to find his best form, but Milan CEO Adriano Galliani defended El Shaarawy by stating that his goals kept Milan's hopes of a top three finish in the league alive.

==== 2013–15: Injury-hit campaigns ====
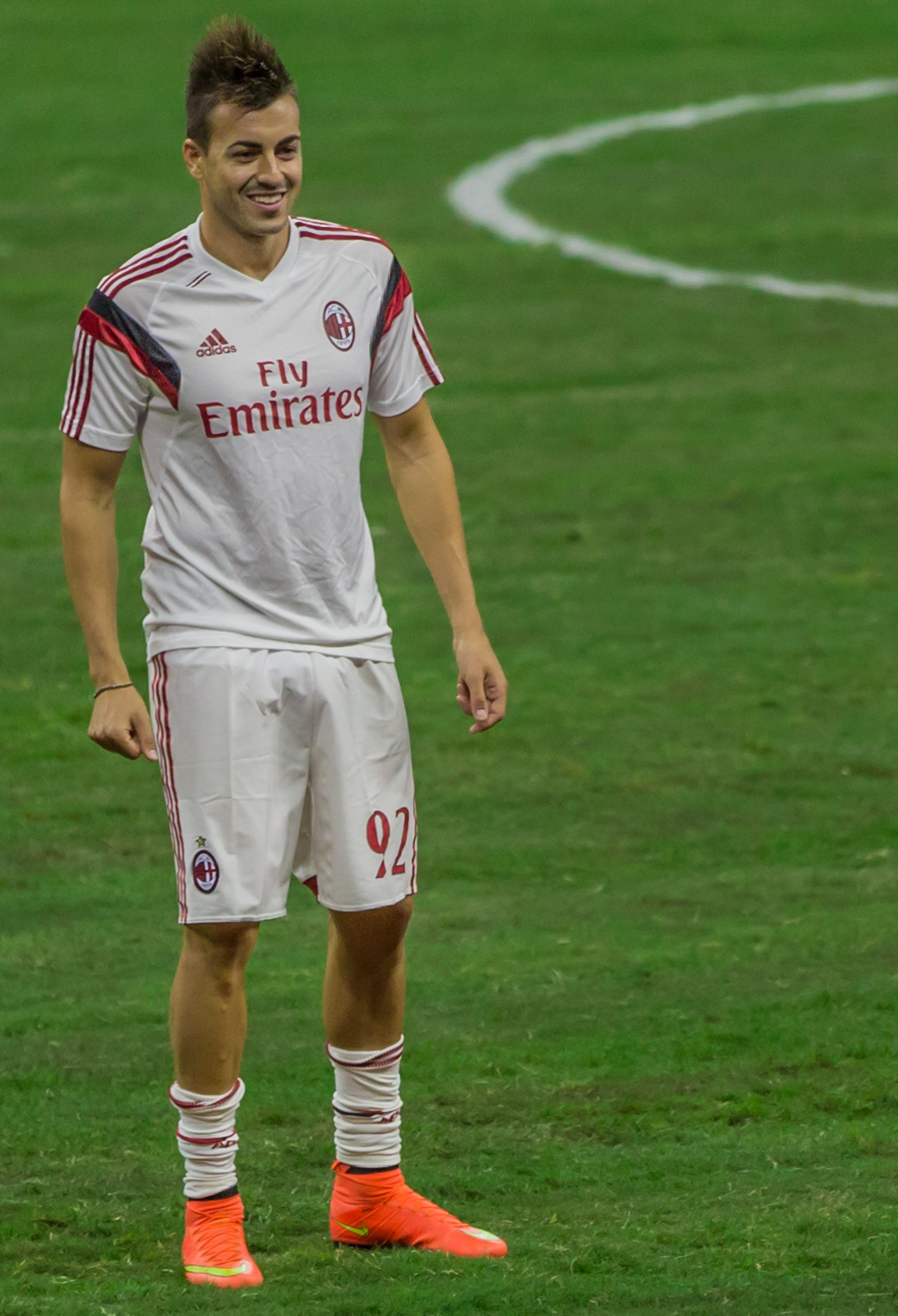
El Shaarawy playing for AC Milan in 2014

After weeks of speculation surrounding his future, Milan officially announced on 2 July 2013 that El Shaarawy would not leave the club in the summer transfer window. On 20 August, he scored his first competitive club goal since February 2013 against PSV Eindhoven in Milan's Champions League play-off first leg draw. The first half of the season was marred by injuries as El Shaarawy made only seven appearances in all competitions for Milan. On 28 December, after a surgery on his right foot failed to heal effectively, he was ruled out for a further ten weeks. El Shaarawy made his return to the side on 11 May 2014, in a 1–2 league loss against Atalanta.

In Milan's first league match of the 2014–15 season against Lazio, El Shaarawy assisted Keisuke Honda's goal in the seventh minute. On 8 November 2014, he scored his first Serie A goal in 622 days against Sampdoria with a curling strike from outside the box, and fell to the floor in tears. After a long absence following another injury, El Shaarawy scored a double in Milan's 3–0 home victory over Torino on 24 May 2015. He made just 28 appearances in all competitions during the last two campaigns.

==== Loan to Monaco ====
On 13 July 2015, El Shaarawy joined Ligue 1 club Monaco on a season-long loan with an option to buy. He made his debut two weeks later, replacing Anthony Martial for the final seven minutes of a 3–1 away win over Young Boys in the Champions League third qualifying round. In the second leg at the Stade Louis II, his first start, he scored his first Monaco goal in a 4–0 win. Before the start of the January transfer window, El Shaarawy was frozen out of the squad, as he had already played 24 games in all official competitions, one game short from activating the conditional obligation to buy him outright.

=== Roma ===
On 26 January 2016, El Shaarawy joined Roma on a loan deal until 30 June 2016, for a fee of €1.4 million. The agreement included an option to make the deal permanent, for a fee of €13 million, before the beginning of the 2016–17 season. Four days later, on his Roma debut, he scored a half scorpion flicked back heel goal in the 48th minute of a 3–1 home win over Frosinone; he then scored in the following match against Sassuolo three days later to seal a 2–0 away victory. In Roma's final match of the season on 14 May, El Shaarawy scored against his parent club Milan as his side won 3–1 at the San Siro and finished third in the league.

On 21 June 2016, Roma opted to buy out El Shaarawy's loan from Milan for the €13 million, keeping him at the club until 2020. On 20 May 2017, he scored twice against Chievo, helping Roma to a 5–3 victory to continue his three-game scoring streak. In Roma's 3–0 Champions League group stage win over Chelsea on 31 October 2017, El Shaarawy bagged two first half goals, including one within the first 40 seconds of the match from 25 yards out.

=== Shanghai Greenland Shenhua ===
On 8 July 2019, El Shaarawy joined Chinese Super League club Shanghai Greenland Shenhua for €16 million. He made his debut for the club on 2 August 2019 in a league game against Wuhan Zall. He then scored his first goal in China on 15 August, netting in a 2–2 draw against Tianjin Tianhai. At the end of his debut season with the club, El Shaarawy lifted the 2019 Chinese FA Cup, scoring in the second leg of Shanghai Greenland Shenhua's final victory against Shandong Luneng Taishan.

=== Return to Roma ===
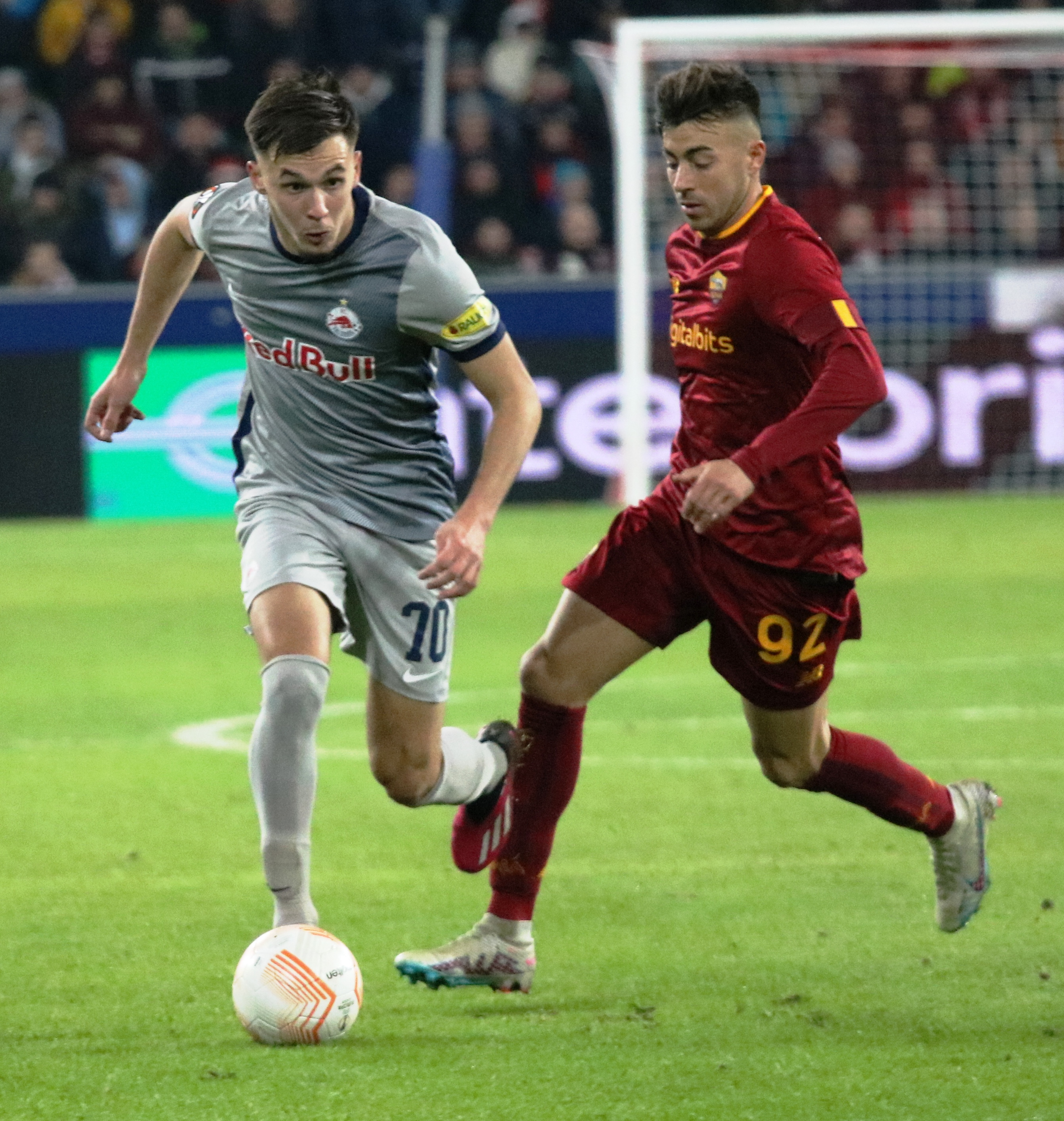
El Shaarawy in a UEFA Europa League match against Red Bull Salzburg in February 2023

On 30 January 2021, El Shaarawy rejoined Roma on a free transfer. He scored his first goal since his return to the club 677 days after his last, netting Roma's second in their 3–0 Europa League round of 16 win over Shakhtar Donetsk on 11 March.

On 10 November 2024, El Shaarawy scored his first two goals of the 2024–25 Serie A season in a 3–2 home defeat against Bologna. In mid-May 2026, he announced that he would leave the club by the end of the season. Later that month, on 24 May, he scored a stoppage-time goal in a 2–0 away win over Hellas Verona, securing his club's place in the UEFA Champions League for the first time in seven years.

=== Return to Genoa ===
On 2 September 2026, Genoa announced the return of El Shaarawy.

== International career ==
El Shaarawy was qualified to play for the Egypt national team through his father, but was denied by coach Hassan Shehata stating that "not every Egyptian playing for a foreign league qualifies to play for the national side". This comment however is contradicted by El Shaarawy himself, as he has stated that he preferred to play for the Italian team. As his father also possessed the nationality from previously living there, El Shaarawy was also eligible to play for Venezuela.

=== Youth teams ===
El Shaarawy was called up to play with the Italy under-17 team, taking part in both the 2009 UEFA U-17 Euro and the 2009 FIFA U-17 World Cup.

He made his debut with the Italy under-21 team on 15 November 2011, in a qualifying match against Hungary.

=== Senior team ===
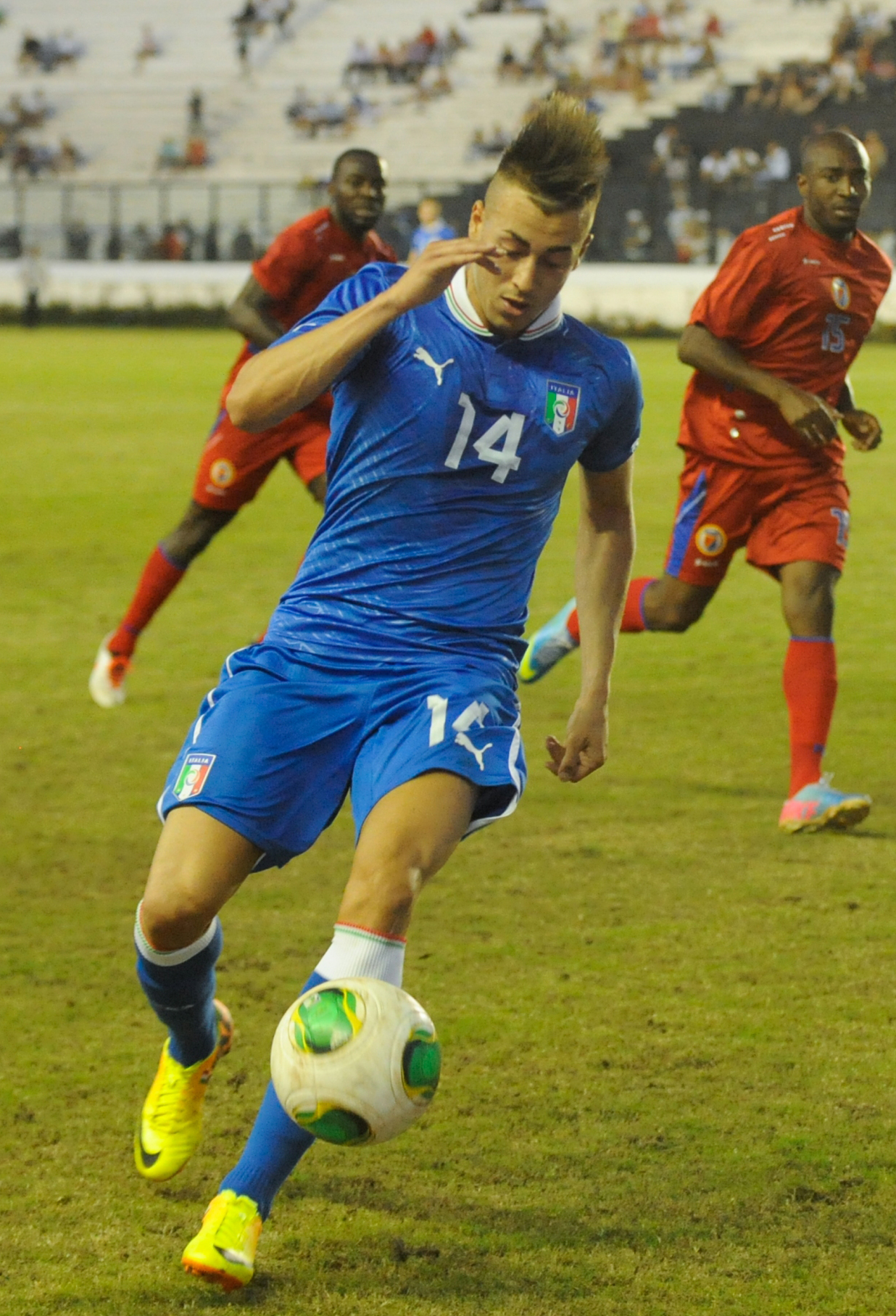
El Shaarawy playing for Italy against Haiti in 2013

On 15 August 2012, El Shaarawy made his senior debut for Italy, starting in a 2–1 friendly defeat against England. He scored his first goal for Italy in his third appearance, getting the opener in a 2–1 friendly loss to France on 14 November 2012.

El Shaarawy represented Italy at the 2013 FIFA Confederations Cup, and made his tournament debut in his country's final group game against hosts Brazil, replacing Alessandro Diamanti for the final nineteen minutes of a 4–2 defeat. He returned for the third-place play-off, playing the entire match and scoring a penalty in Italy's shoot-out success against Uruguay.

El Shaarawy was not included in Italy's 2014 FIFA World Cup squad, after missing most of the 2013–14 club season through injury.

On 10 October 2015, El Shaarawy ended a three-year goal drought, scoring the winner in Italy's 3–1 away victory over Azerbaijan in a UEFA Euro 2016 qualifying match; this was his first international goal since November 2012, and the win guaranteed Italy a place at the final tournament. On 31 May 2016, he was named to Antonio Conte's 23-man Italy squad for the upcoming championship in France. He made his only appearance at Euro 2016 on 22 June, coming off the bench in Italy's final group match against the Republic of Ireland.

On 15 October 2019, El Shaarawy returned to the national team for the first time since Italy's 2018 FIFA World Cup playoff defeat to Sweden two years earlier, being substituted on and scoring the fourth goal in a 5–0 Euro 2020 qualifying away win over Liechtenstein. He got a brace in Italy's 6–0 friendly victory against Moldova on 7 October 2020.

== Style of play ==
Since his breakthrough season, El Shaarawy was considered to be an up-and-coming, potentially world-class player, and one of the most promising and talented young Italian players. A versatile and hard-working forward, he primarily plays as a left winger, a position which allows him to cut into the centre onto his stronger right foot and either attempt a shot at goal or create chances for teammates; he can also play as an attacking midfielder, as a second striker, on the right flank, as a centre forward, or even as striker, due to his eye for goal. Eric Steitz has noted that El Shaarawy is mainly known for his pace and agility, as well as his "outstanding dribbling ability and technical skill". He has also stated that El Shaarawy has often demonstrated his shooting power and goalscoring ability with strikes from outside the box, and has described the player as an "above-average passer", who "creates space with a solid first-touch".

El Shaarawy's playing style has drawn comparisons with FIFA World Player of the Year winner Cristiano Ronaldo. El Shaarawy cites former AC Milan playmaker Kaká as his role model. Milan legend José Altafini compared El Shaarawy to Neymar and Lionel Messi: "El Shaarawy reminds me of Neymar and Messi. They have a low center of gravity. They play with the ball glued to their feet. He has already proven that he's a good player. The important thing is not to bulk him up too much". In spite of his talent, however, he has often struggled with injuries.

== Sponsorship ==
In 2012, El Shaarawy signed a sponsorship deal with American sportswear and equipment supplier, Nike. He appeared in an advert for the new Nike Green Speed II alongside Mario Götze, Eden Hazard, Raheem Sterling, Christian Eriksen and Theo Walcott in November 2012.

El Shaarawy appears on the Italian cover of FIFA 14, alongside global cover star Lionel Messi.

== Personal life ==
El Shaarawy married Italian influencer Ludovica Pagani on 27 May 2026.

== Career statistics ==
=== Club ===
As of match played 8 November 2026

Appearances and goals by club, season and competition
Club	Season	League			National cup (Note: Includes Coppa Italia, Chinese FA Cup)		Continental		Total	
Club	Season	Division	Apps	Goals	Apps	Goals	Apps	Goals	Apps	Goals
Genoa	2008–09	Serie A	1	0	0	0	—		1	0
Genoa	2009–10	Serie A	2	0	0	0	—		2	0
Genoa	Total		3	0	0	0	—		3	0
Padova (loan)	2010–11	Serie B	29	9	1	0	—		30	9
AC Milan	2011–12	Serie A	22	2	4	2	2 (Note: Appearances in UEFA Champions League)	0	28	4
AC Milan	2012–13	Serie A	37	16	1	1	8	2	46	19
AC Milan	2013–14	Serie A	6	0	0	0	3	1	9	1
AC Milan	2014–15	Serie A	18	3	1	0	—		19	3
AC Milan	Total		83	21	6	3	13	3	102	27
Monaco (loan)	2015–16	Ligue 1	15	0	0	0	9 (Note: Three appearances and one goal in UEFA Champions League, six appearances and two goals in UEFA Europa League)	3	24	3
Roma (loan)	2015–16	Serie A	16	8	—		2	0	18	8
Roma	2016–17	Serie A	32	8	4	2	8 (Note: Appearances in UEFA Europa League)	2	44	12
Roma	2017–18	Serie A	33	7	1	0	10	2	44	9
Roma	2018–19	Serie A	28	11	1	0	4	0	33	11
Roma	Total		93	26	6	2	22	4	121	32
Shanghai Shenhua	2019	Chinese Super League	10	1	3	3	—		13	4
Shanghai Shenhua	2020	Chinese Super League	6	0	0	0	—		6	0
Shanghai Shenhua	Total		16	1	3	3	—		19	4
Roma	2020–21	Serie A	10	1	0	0	4	1	14	2
Roma	2021–22	Serie A	27	3	1	0	8 (Note: Appearances in UEFA Europa Conference League)	4	36	7
Roma	2022–23	Serie A	29	7	2	0	11	2	42	9
Roma	2023–24	Serie A	33	3	2	0	13	0	48	3
Roma	2024–25	Serie A	31	3	1	0	9	0	41	3
Roma	2025–26	Serie A	20	1	1	0	7	1	28	2
Roma	Total		150	18	7	0	52	8	209	26
Roma	Roma total		259	52	13	2	76	12	348	66
Genoa	2026–27	Serie A	7	0	1	0	—		8	0
Career total			412	83	23	8	98	18	534	109

=== International ===
As of match played 29 June 2024

Appearances and goals by national team and year
National team	Year	Apps	Goals
Italy	2012	3	1
Italy	2013	7	0
Italy	2014	1	0
Italy	2015	6	1
Italy	2016	3	1
Italy	2017	3	0
Italy	2018	0	0
Italy	2019	2	1
Italy	2020	3	2
Italy	2021	1	0
Italy	2022	0	0
Italy	2023	2	1
Italy	2024	1	0
Total		32	7

Scores and results list Italy's goal tally first, score column indicates score after each El Shaarawy goal.

List of international goals scored by Stephan El Shaarawy
No.	Date	Venue	Opponent	Score	Result	Competition
1	14 November 2012	Stadio Ennio Tardini, Parma, Italy	France	1–0	1–2	Friendly
2	10 October 2015	Tofiq Bahramov Stadium, Baku, Azerbaijan	Azerbaijan	2–1	3–1	UEFA Euro 2016 qualifying
3	29 March 2016	Allianz Arena, Munich, Germany	Germany	1–4	1–4	Friendly
4	15 October 2019	Rheinpark Stadion, Vaduz, Liechtenstein	Liechtenstein	4–0	5–0	UEFA Euro 2020 qualifying
5	7 October 2020	Stadio Artemio Franchi, Florence, Italy	Moldova	3–0	6–0	Friendly
6	7 October 2020	Stadio Artemio Franchi, Florence, Italy	Moldova	5–0	6–0	Friendly
7	17 November 2023	Stadio Olimpico, Rome, Italy	North Macedonia	5–2	5–2	UEFA Euro 2024 qualifying

== Honours ==
Genoa Youth

- Campionato Nazionale Primavera: 2009–10
- Coppa Italia Primavera: 2008–09
- Supercoppa Primavera: 2009

Shanghai Shenhua

- Chinese FA Cup: 2019

Roma

- UEFA Europa Conference League: 2021–22

Individual

- UEFA European Under-17 Championship Team of the Tournament: 2009
- Serie B Footballer of the Year: 2011
- Serie A Best Young Revelation: 2012
- Pallone d'Argento: 2012–13
