= Mory Bamba =

Ivorian footballer

Personal information
- Date of birth: 1 June 2002 (age 24)
- Place of birth: Bondoukou, Ivory Coast
- Height: 1.67 m (5 ft 6 in)
- Position: Forward

Team information
- Current team: Enna

Youth career
- –2015: Vigor Perconti
- 2015–2021: Roma

Senior career*
Years	Team	Apps	(Gls)
2020–2021	Roma	0	(0)
2021–2022	Leixões	7	(0)
2023	Livorno	14	(4)
2024	Dinamo City	1	(0)
2024	Luparense	4	(1)
2024–2025	Roma City	8	(0)
2025–	Enna	19	(1)
- * Club domestic league appearances and goals as of 25 January 2026

Mory Bamba (born 1 June 2002) is an Ivorian professional football player who plays for Italian Serie D club Enna.

== Club career ==
Mory Bamba joined Italian club Roma in 2015, from the Vigor Perconti, a small club from the Italian capital, located in the Collatino quarter of Rome.

He made his professional debut for Roma on the 10 December 2020 in a Europa League game against CSKA Sofia. He then became Roma's youngest foreign-born player to play in any European competition.
