= Mirko Antonucci =

Italian footballer (born 1999)

Personal information
- Date of birth: 11 March 1999 (age 27)
- Place of birth: Rome, Italy
- Height: 1.81 m (5 ft 11 in)
- Positions: Winger; attacking midfielder

Team information
- Current team: Cittadella
- Number: 10

Youth career
- 2011–2018: Roma

Senior career*
Years	Team	Apps	(Gls)
2018–2021	Roma	4	(0)
2018–2019	→ Pescara (loan)	18	(0)
2020	→ Vitória de Setúbal (loan)	6	(1)
2020–2021	→ Salernitana (loan)	3	(0)
2021–2023	Cittadella	73	(14)
2023–2026	Spezia	19	(1)
2024	→ Cosenza (loan)	13	(1)
2024–2025	→ Cesena (loan)	35	(4)
2025–2026	→ Bari (loan)	14	(0)
2026	→ Salernitana (loan)	4	(0)
2026–	Cittadella	4	(2)

International career
2014	Italy U15	4	(1)
2014–2015	Italy U16	13	(0)
2015	Italy U17	4	(0)
2016	Italy U18	2	(0)
2018–2019	Italy U20	3	(0)
- * Club domestic league appearances and goals as of 26 September 2026

Mirko Antonucci (born 11 March 1999) is an Italian professional footballer who plays as a winger or an attacking midfielder for Serie C Group A club Cittadella.

== Professional career ==
=== Roma ===
Antonucci joined Roma at the age of 13, after being scouted by their legendary former player and coach Bruno Conti. He signed his first professional contract with the team on 28 September 2017. He made his professional debut for Roma in a 1–1 Serie A tie with Sampdoria on 24 January 2018, and he assisted Edin Džeko for his side's late equalizer. On 2 May, he made his European debut against Liverpool in a Champions League semi-final.

==== Loan to Pescara ====
On 19 July 2018, Antonucci signed to Pescara on loan until 30 June 2019.

==== Loan to Vitória de Setúbal ====
On 30 January 2020, he joined Vitória de Setúbal on loan until the end of the 2019–20 season. He had his loan terminated due to posting TikTok videos with him dancing, after a loss against Boavista.

==== Loan to Salernitana ====
After appearing on the bench for Roma in the first three games of the 2020–21 Serie A season, on 5 October 2020 he joined Salernitana on loan.

=== Cittadella ===
On 30 July 2021, it was announced that Antonucci had joined Serie B club Cittadella on a permanent basis.

=== Spezia ===
On 1 August 2023, recently-relegated to Serie B side Spezia announced the signing of Antonucci on a four-year contract.

On 1 February 2024, Antonucci was loaned to Cosenza. On 31 July 2024, he moved on a new loan to Cesena, with an option to buy. On 21 August 2025, he joined Bari on loan with an option to buy.

== Career statistics ==
=== Club ===
As of match played 1 May 2023

Appearances and goals by club, season and competition
Club	Season	League			Cup		Europe		Other		Total	
Club	Season	Division	Apps	Goals	Apps	Goals	Apps	Goals	Apps	Goals	Apps	Goals
Roma	2017–18	Serie A	2	0	0	0	1	0	–		3	0
Roma	2019–20	Serie A	2	0	–		2	0	–		4	0
Roma	Total		4	0	0	0	3	0	0	0	7	0
Pescara (loan)	2018–19	Serie B	18	0	2	0	–		1	0	21	0
Vitória de Setúbal (loan)	2019–20	Primeira Liga	6	1	–		–		–		6	1
Salernitana (loan)	2020–21	Serie B	3	0	1	0	–		–		4	0
Cittadella	2021–22	Serie B	36	3	2	0	–		–		38	3
Cittadella	2022–23	Serie B	34	10	1	0	–		–		24	8
Cittadella	Total		70	13	3	0	–		–		73	13
Career total			101	14	6	0	3	0	1	0	111	14
