= Filippo Tripi =

Italian footballer (born 2002)

Personal information
- Date of birth: 6 January 2002 (age 24)
- Place of birth: Rome, Italy
- Height: 1.79 m (5 ft 10 in)
- Positions: Defensive midfielder; centre-back

Team information
- Current team: Scafatese

Youth career
- 2009–2010: Palocco
- 2010–2020: Roma

Senior career*
| Years | Team | Apps | (Gls) |
| 2020–2022 | Roma | 0 | (0) |
| 2023–2025 | Mura | 53 | (1) |
| 2025–2026 | Ternana | 16 | (0) |
| 2026– | Scafatese | 0 | (0) |

International career
| 2019–2020 | Italy U18 | 3 | (0) |
- * Club domestic league appearances and goals as of 30 April 2026

Filippo Tripi (born 6 January 2002) is an Italian professional footballer who plays as a midfielder for Serie C club Scafatese.

== Career ==
Tripi is a youth product of Roma, where he served as a captain of their youth team. He made his professional debut with Roma in a 2–0 UEFA Europa League win over CFR Cluj on 26 November 2020.

On 16 December 2022, Tripi signed a contract until 2025 with Slovenian PrvaLiga outfit Mura.
