= Pietro Boer =

Italian footballer (born 2002)

Personal information
- Date of birth: 12 May 2002 (age 24)
- Place of birth: Mestre, Italy
- Height: 1.95 m (6 ft 5 in)
- Position: Goalkeeper

Team information
- Current team: Juve Stabia
- Number: 23

Youth career
- Venezia
- 2018–2023: Roma

Senior career*
Years	Team	Apps	(Gls)
2021–2025	Roma	0	(0)
2024–2025	→ Pianese (loan)	36	(0)
2025–	Juve Stabia	6	(0)
- * Club domestic league appearances and goals as of 10 May 2026

Pietro Boer (born 12 May 2002) is an Italian professional footballer who plays as a goalkeeper for Serie B club Juve Stabia.

== Career ==
A youth product of Venezia, Boer signed with Roma on 15 August 2018 on a 5-year contract. He made his professional debut with Roma in a 3–1 UEFA Europa League loss to CSKA Sofia on 10 December 2020. On 1 April 2023, he extended his contract from 2024 until 2026.

On 5 August 2024, Boer was loaned out to Pianese in Serie C.

On 1 August 2025, Boer joined Juve Stabia in Serie B, permanently on a two-season contract.

== Honours ==
Roma

- UEFA Europa Conference League: 2021–22
- UEFA Europa League runner-up: 2022–23
