= Simone Farelli =

Italian footballer

Personal information
- Date of birth: 19 February 1983 (age 43)
- Place of birth: Rome, Italy
- Height: 1.86 m (6 ft 1 in)
- Position: Goalkeeper

Senior career*
Years	Team	Apps	(Gls)
2001–2002	Astrea	31	(0)
2002–2005	Siena	0	(0)
2004–2005	→ Nocerina (loan)	10	(0)
2005–2006	Vittoria	11	(0)
2006–2007	Ancona	17	(0)
2007–2008	Lanciano	20	(0)
2008–2010	Crotone	18	(0)
2010–2014	Siena	7	(0)
2014–2016	Latina	24	(0)
2016–2017	Trapani	4	(0)
2017	→ Arezzo (loan)	0	(0)
2017–2018	Novara	0	(0)
2018–2020	Pescara	0	(0)
2020–2021	Roma	0	(0)
- * Club domestic league appearances and goals as of 31 July 2020

Simone Farelli (born 19 February 1983) is an Italian footballer who plays as a goalkeeper.

== Club career ==
=== Early career ===
Born in Rome, Farelli began his senior career at hometown Serie D club Astrea.

=== Siena ===
In mid-2002 he was signed by Siena. At that time Siena was a Serie B club. In 2003, he followed the team to promote to Serie A. In mid-2004 he left for Serie C2 club Nocerina, but in January 2005 returned to the city of Siena.

Farelli returned to the Italian fourth level in 2005–06 season, for Vittoria. Then he left for Serie C1 club Ancona and then Lanciano. In February 2007 he received a call-up to Italy Universiade team for a training match. In that match he was a substitute.

=== Crotone ===
Farelli settled in Crotone in 2008–09 season, the first club that he spent more than 1 season. The team won the first ever promotion playoffs to the third level in 2008, the year that the level was renamed to Lega Pro Prima Divisione. He was the backup keeper of Emanuele Concetti in his two-year stay.

=== Siena (second spell) ===
In 2010–11 Serie B, Crotone signed Vid Belec and Giacomo Bindi, and Farelli was allowed to leave for Siena in a 1+1 year deal. Siena was newly relegated from Serie A at that time.

He was the third keeper of Siena, behind Ferdinando Coppola and Gianluca Pegolo. Despite Coppola was replaced by Željko Brkić in the 2011–12 season. Siena won promotion at the end of 2010–11 Serie B.

=== Latina ===
In July 2014 Farelli and former Siena teammate Francesco Valiani were signed by Latina on free transfers.

=== Trapani ===
On 11 July 2016 Farelli was signed by Trapani on a 2-year contract. On 30 January 2017 Farelli was loaned to Arezzo.

=== Novara ===
On 25 July 2017 Farelli was transferred to Novara, with Francesco Pacini moved in opposite direction on a temporary deal.

=== Pescara ===
On 4 September 2018 Pescara signed Farelli on a free transfer. He was assigned the number 21 shirt.
