= Nicolò Zaniolo =

Italian footballer (born 1999)

Personal information
- Full name: Nicolò Zaniolo
- Date of birth: 2 July 1999 (age 27)
- Place of birth: Massa, Italy
- Height: 1.90 m (6 ft 3 in)
- Positions: Attacking midfielder; wide midfielder

Team information
- Current team: Udinese
- Number: 10

Youth career
- 2008–2010: Genoa
- 2010–2016: Fiorentina

Senior career*
Years	Team	Apps	(Gls)
2016–2017	Virtus Entella	7	(0)
2017–2018	Inter Milan	0	(0)
2018–2023	Roma	94	(13)
2023–2026	Galatasaray	13	(5)
2023–2024	→ Aston Villa (loan)	25	(2)
2024–2025	→ Atalanta (loan)	14	(2)
2025	→ Fiorentina (loan)	9	(0)
2025–2026	→ Udinese (loan)	32	(5)
2026–	Udinese	7	(2)

International career^{‡}
2016–2017	Italy U18	2	(0)
2017–2018	Italy U19	18	(6)
2018–2019	Italy U21	8	(0)
2019–	Italy	19	(2)
Medal record
Men's football
Representing Italy
UEFA Nations League
Third place	2021 Italy
Third place	2023 Netherlands
UEFA European Under-19 Championship
Runner-up	2018 Finland
- * Club domestic league appearances and goals as of 23:39, 22 November 2026 (UTC) ‡ National team caps and goals as of 24 March 2024

Nicolò Zaniolo (Italian pronunciation: [nikoˈlɔ ddzaˈnjɔːlo]; born 2 July 1999) is an Italian professional footballer who plays as an attacking midfielder or wide midfielder for Serie A club Udinese and the Italy national team.

== Club career ==
=== Early career ===
Born in Massa, Tuscany, Zaniolo grew up in the Fiorentina youth system. On the final day of the 2016 mid-year transfer window, he was released by Fiorentina, and subsequently joined Virtus Entella. After several months playing for the Entella Primavera side, Zaniolo was given his professional debut in Serie B on 11 March 2017, aged 17, in a 3–2 win against Benevento. In total, he collected seven appearances for the Biancocelesti in the 2016–17 season.

=== Inter Milan ===
On 5 July 2017, Inter Milan announced they had signed Zaniolo, for a reported fee of €1.8 million, plus €1.7 million in bonuses. He played for the Primavera side in the 2017–18 season, finishing top-scorer of the team with 13 goals and winning the Campionato Nazionale Primavera. Zaniolo made his Inter debut in a pre-season friendly on 9 July 2017. On 14 April 2018 manager Spalletti selected him to the first team squad against Atalanta; however, he did not play any competitive game for Inter's first team during the season.

=== Roma ===
==== 2018–19: Breakthrough and Serie A Young Player of the Year ====
In June 2018, it was reported that Zaniolo and Davide Santon had joined Roma as a part of the deal moving Radja Nainggolan to Inter. Zaniolo completed his medical on 25 June, and signed a five-year contract with the club, for a fee of €4.5 million plus 15% resell revenue. He made his first appearance for Roma and UEFA Champions League debut on 19 September, in a 3–0 defeat to Real Madrid at the Santiago Bernabéu. He made his Serie A debut on 26 September 2018, aged 19, in the home match won 4–0 against Frosinone. On 26 December, he scored his first goal in Serie A in a 3–1 win against Sassuolo. The following year, during a UEFA Champions League match against FC Porto, Zaniolo became the youngest Italian player to score twice in a single match in the competition when he scored both of Roma's goals in a 2–1 win. For his efforts, he was named the Serie A Young Player of the Year for 2018-19.

==== 2019–21: Injury issues ====
Zaniolo picked up where he left off, scoring 4 and assisting 1 in Serie A through 18 matchdays, and continuing to be dangerous as a dribbler. On 12 January 2020, Zaniolo suffered an anterior cruciate ligament injury in his right knee during a 2–1 home loss to Juventus. He returned to training in late June 2020. In addition, he received letters of support from both the Italian and global footballing community, including Roberto Mancini, Roberto Baggio, and Francesco Totti, who had previously been operated by the same surgeon.

Although he had been set to miss the remainder of club football season and highly likely would have missed the upcoming UEFA Euro 2020, all footballing activities in Europe were suspended by March 2020 due to the COVID-19 pandemic, with club competitions rescheduled to be played behind closed doors starting in the summer.

On 5 July 2020, Zaniolo made his return-from-injury appearance, coming onto the pitch after 66 minutes in the away Serie A 1–2 loss against Napoli. A week later, Zaniolo scored his first post-injury goal in the away Serie A 3–0 win over Brescia, which was followed by another goal scored at the tail-end of a 6–1 away Serie A win over SPAL on 22 July 2020.

Zaniolo missed the entire 2020–21 season due to another anterior cruciate ligament injury sustained in September 2020 over the international break.

==== 2021–22: Return, Conference League and loss in form ====
He returned to the pitch in July 2021 during pre-season, under newly appointed coach José Mourinho.

Zaniolo's first season back was marked by struggles both with fitness and with refereeing. Throughout the season, players frequently fouled Zaniolo without punishment. It came to such an extreme that manager Mourinho eventually said, "I will finish with one observation. I want to say something that probably goes against my interests: if I were Nicolò Zaniolo, I would start thinking that perhaps playing in Serie A means things will be stacked against me."

Zaniolo scored his first goal since his return from his second knee injury in the 3–0 win over Trabzonspor in the inaugural UEFA Europa Conference League. He scored a hat trick against Bodo/Glimt in the quarterfinals of the Europa Conference League to confirm Roma's passage to the semifinals, his first such. On 25 May 2022, he scored the only goal as Roma beat Feyenoord in the final to win the Europa Conference League.

In the first half of the 2022–23 season, Zaniolo had a breakdown in relations with Roma, which led the club to consider fines and potentially excluding him from the squad for the remainder of the season.

=== Galatasaray ===
==== 2022–23: Debut season ====
On 8 February 2023, it was announced that Zaniolo would officially transfer to Süper Lig side Galatasaray on a permanent basis. For the transfer, a purchase fee of €15M (excluding additional bonuses) and another 20% of his next move will be paid to the Roma club, a transfer which set the Turkish transfer record. Zaniolo's contract is reported to have a 35 million euro release clause. His transfer news was not announced effusively by Galatasaray due to the earthquake that had occurred a few days before his arrival. He took the number 17 in memory of a young Galatasaray fan (aged 17) who died in the earthquake.

He made an impressive debut with his new club in a friendly against Alanyaspor on 26 February, coming on in the 80th minute and scoring a goal in stoppage time. He scored another goal and provided an assist in a friendly match against İstanbulspor on 4 March. Zaniolo scored on his official debut for the club on 11 March, a 1–0 league win at home over Kasımpaşa.

Zaniolo became the champion in the Süper Lig in the 2022–23 season with the Galatasaray team. Defeating Ankaragücü 4–1 away in the match played in the 36th week on 30 May 2023, Galatasaray secured the lead with 2 weeks before the end and won the 23rd championship in its history.

==== Aston Villa (loan) ====
On 18 August 2023, having played one match in the Champions League qualifying rounds for Galatasaray, Zaniolo was loaned to Premier League club Aston Villa for the rest of the 2023–24 season. Zaniolo was initially poised to make his debut in Aston Villa's Europa Conference League play-off against Hibernian, however was ineligible, due to his earlier appearance in the Champions League with Galatasaray. He went on to make his debut on 27 August 2023, as a second half substitute in a 3–1 away league victory over Burnley.

In October 2023, Zaniolo was implicated in a gambling scandal. He left the Italy national team to return to Birmingham after being questioned by the Turin public prosecutor's office. Zaniolo admitted to gambling on card games, but strongly denied any involvement in the sports betting that saw Italy teammate Sandro Tonali issued with a lengthy footballing ban.

On 14 December 2023 he scored his first goal for the club in a 1–1 game away to Zrinjski Mostar in the Europa Conference League. On 22 December 2023, Zaniolo scored his first Premier league goal for Aston Villa, scoring in the 97th minute for a 1–1 equaliser against Sheffield United.

On 13 May 2024, Zaniolo suffered a broken metatarsal in a 3–3 Premier League draw against Liverpool which ended his season one match prematurely.

==== Atalanta (loan) ====
On 5 July, Zaniolo returned to Serie A, joining Atalanta on a one-year loan from Galatasaray. The deal was reported to be worth €6.4 million for the loan, with a conditional obligation to buy for €15.5 million, in addition €2 million bonuses. Zaniolo made 23 appearances and scored three goals across all competitions for Atalanta, though his transfer was not made permanent and he left the club midway through the 2024–25 season.

==== Fiorentina (loan) ====
On 3 February 2025, Zaniolo moved on a new loan to Fiorentina, with an option to buy.

On 27 May 2025, AS Roma released an official statement claiming that on 26 May 2025, following a Primavera match between Fiorentina and AS Roma, Zaniolo entered the Roma dressing room without accreditation, reportedly visibly intoxicated. The club stated that Zaniolo urinated within the Roma facilities, provoked Roma players and physically assaulted Roma youth players Mattia Almaviva and Marco Litti - both required hospitalization.

=== Udinese ===
Late into the summer 2025 transfer window, Zanolo joined Udinese on a season-long loan until summer 2026.

On 15 June 2026, Zaniolo returned to Udinese in a permanent transfer.

== International career ==
=== Youth ===
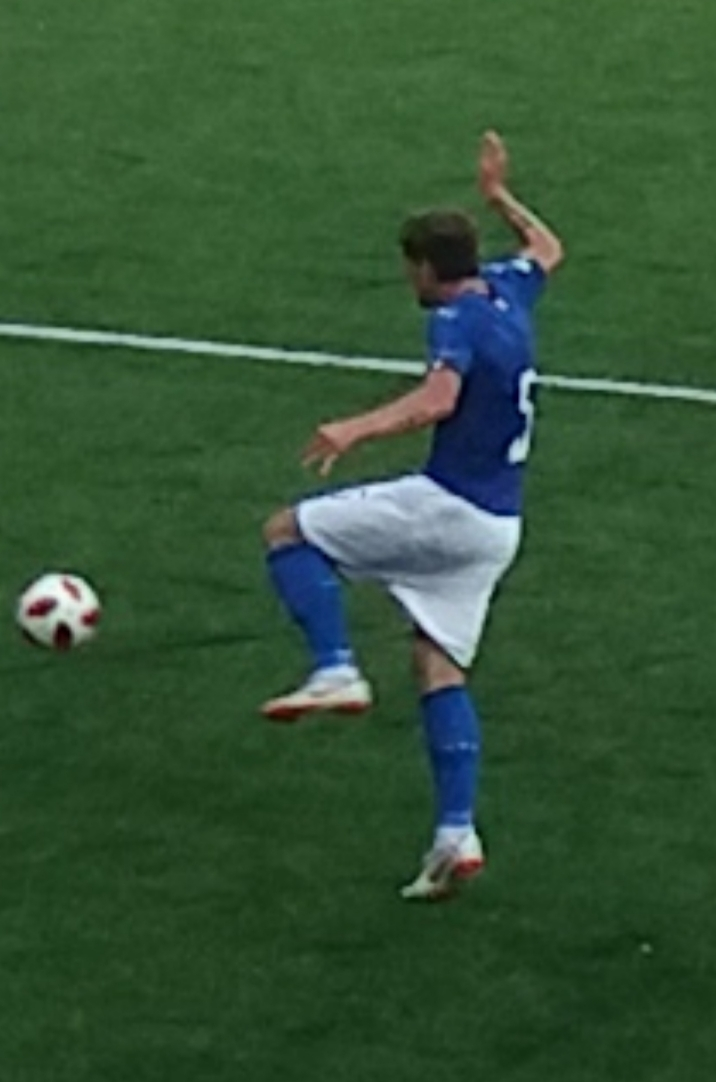
Zaniolo playing for Italy U19 in 2018

With the Italy under-19 side, Zaniolo took part in the 2018 UEFA European Under-19 Championship, reaching the final of the tournament, which Italy lost 4–3 after extra time against Portugal.

He made his debut with the Italy U21 team on 11 October 2018, under manager Luigi Di Biagio, in a 1–0 friendly defeat to Belgium.

=== Senior ===
On 1 September 2018, he was given his first senior international call-up for Italy by manager Roberto Mancini – without having received a cap in Serie A – for Italy's opening UEFA Nations League matches against Poland and Portugal later that month.

He made his debut with the senior team on 23 March 2019, entering as a substitute for Verratti in a 2–0 home win over Finland in Italy's opening UEFA Euro 2020 qualifying match. He made his first start for Italy on 15 October, in a 5–0 away win against Liechtenstein, in a Euro 2020 qualifier (the opposition that day included Yanik Frick, a childhood friend). His first international goals came on 18 November, a brace in a 9–1 home win over Armenia, in Italy's final Euro 2020 qualifier; he also set up Ciro Immobile's second goal during the match.

On 7 September 2020, after being called up for the start of Italy's campaign in the 2020–21 UEFA Nations League, he suffered a second anterior cruciate ligament injury in eight months, this time in his left knee, in an eventual 1–0 away win over the Netherlands.

On 17 May 2024, it was confirmed that Zaniolo would miss UEFA Euro 2024 after breaking his metatarsal in the penultimate league game of the season.

== Style of play ==
Standing at 1.90 m (6 ft 3 in), Zaniolo is a tall player and with a wide style of play, due to his technique, energy, and physicality, he can operate in several midfield positions, and has been used as an attacking midfielder or trequartista, as an offensive-minded central midfielder or mezzala, as a box-to-box midfielder, and even as a deep-lying playmaker.

He can also play out on the flanks, offering versatility across the front line. His ability to contribute in wide areas is supported by his goal threat, chance creation, and tendency to make late runs into the box. He has shown a capability to strike from distance on occasion. Once considered one of Italy's more promising young prospects, his early reputation suggested significant potential at the European level.

== Personal life ==
Zaniolo is the son of Igor Zaniolo, a former professional footballer who played as a forward in Serie B and Serie C. He has a son, Tommaso, born in 2021 to his former girlfriend Sara Scaperrotta. The pair broke up in 2020 before the birth of their son and later got back together in 2024.

== Career statistics ==
=== Club ===
As of match played 22 November 2026

Appearances and goals by club, season and competition
Club	Season	League			National cup (Note: Includes Coppa Italia, Turkish Cup, FA Cup)		Europe		Other		Total	
Club	Season	Division	Apps	Goals	Apps	Goals	Apps	Goals	Apps	Goals	Apps	Goals
Virtus Entella	2016–17	Serie B	7	0	—		—		—		7	0
Roma	2018–19	Serie A	27	4	2	0	7 (Note: Appearance(s) in UEFA Champions League)	2	—		36	6
Roma	2019–20	Serie A	26	6	0	0	7 (Note: Appearances in UEFA Europa League)	2	—		33	8
Roma	2020–21	Serie A	0	0	0	0	0	0	—		0	0
Roma	2021–22	Serie A	28	2	2	0	12 (Note: Appearances in UEFA (Europa) Conference League)	6	—		42	8
Roma	2022–23	Serie A	13	1	1	0	3	1	—		17	2
Roma	Total		94	13	5	0	29	11	—		128	24
Galatasaray	2022–23	Süper Lig	10	5	1	0	—		—		11	5
Galatasaray	2023–24	Süper Lig	0	0	—		1	0	—		1	0
Galatasaray	2025–26	Süper Lig	4	0	—		—		—		4	0
Galatasaray	Total		14	5	1	0	1	0	—		16	5
Aston Villa (loan)	2023–24	Premier League	25	2	3	0	10	1	1 (Note: Appearance in EFL Cup)	0	39	3
Atalanta (loan)	2024–25	Serie A	14	2	1	0	7	1	1 (Note: Appearance in Supercoppa Italiana)	0	23	3
Fiorentina (loan)	2024–25	Serie A	9	0	—		4	0	—		13	0
Udinese (loan)	2025–26	Serie A	32	5	2	1	—		—		34	6
Udinese	2026–27	Serie A	7	2	1	0	—		—		8	2
Udinese	Udinese total		39	7	3	1	—		—		42	8
Career total			202	29	13	1	51	13	2	0	268	43

=== International ===
As of match played 24 March 2024

Appearances and goals by national team and year
National team	Year	Apps	Goals
Italy	2019	5	2
Italy	2020	2	0
Italy	2021	1	0
Italy	2022	3	0
Italy	2023	6	0
Italy	2024	2	0
Total		19	2

Scores and results list Italy's goal tally first.

List of international goals scored by Nicolò Zaniolo
No.	Date	Venue	Cap	Opponent	Score	Result	Competition
1	18 November 2019	Stadio Renzo Barbera, Palermo, Italy	5	Armenia	2–0	9–1	UEFA Euro 2020 qualifying
2	18 November 2019	Stadio Renzo Barbera, Palermo, Italy	5	Armenia	5–0	9–1	UEFA Euro 2020 qualifying

== Honours ==
AS Roma

- UEFA Europa Conference League: 2021–22

Galatasaray

- Süper Lig: 2022–23

Individual

- Serie A Best Under-23: 2018–19
