= Justin Kluivert =

Dutch footballer (born 1999)

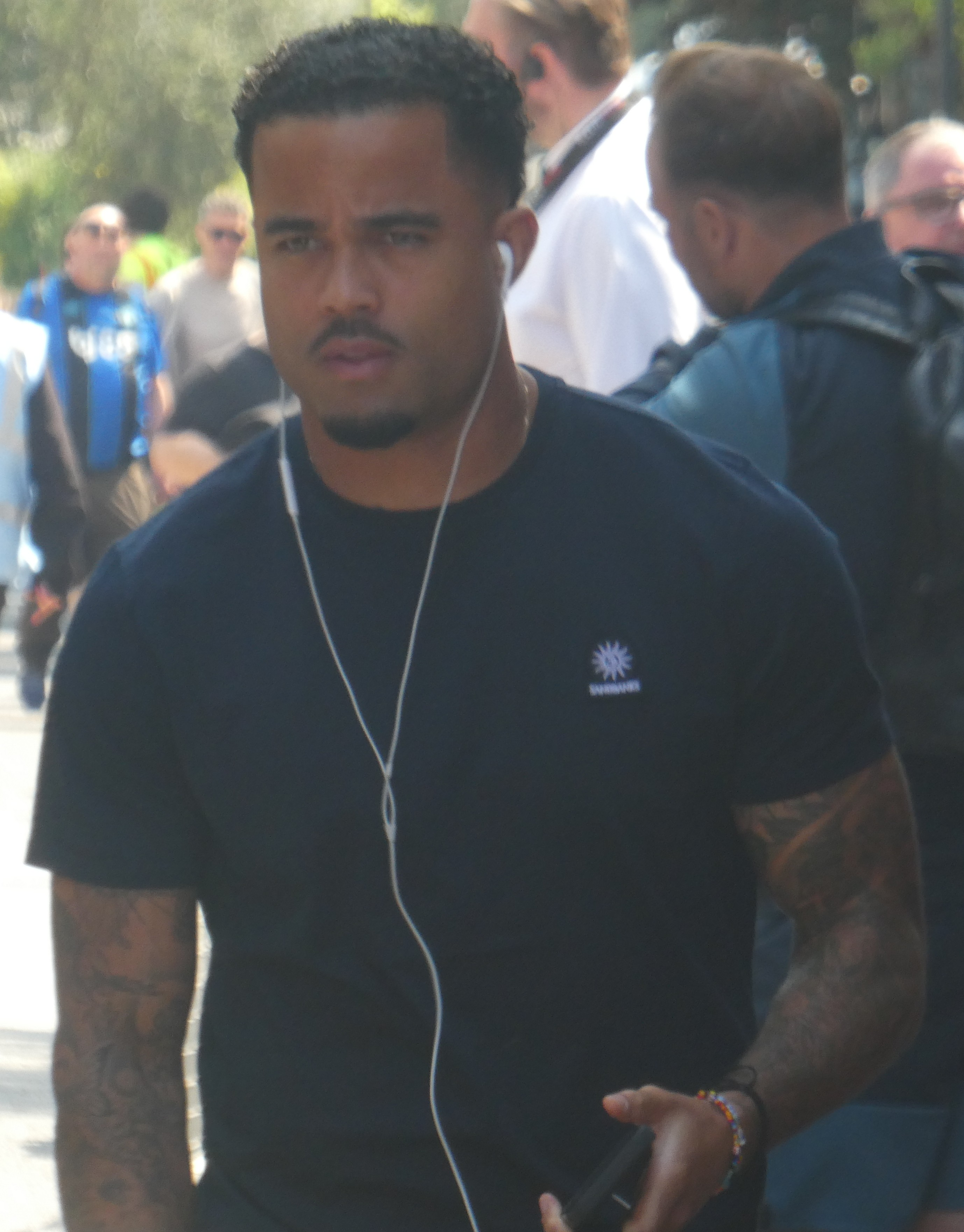
- Kluivert in 2026

Personal information
- Full name: Justin Dean Kluivert
- Date of birth: 5 May 1999 (age 27)
- Place of birth: Amsterdam, Netherlands
- Height: 1.73 m (5 ft 8 in)
- Positions: Attacking midfielder; winger

Team information
- Current team: Bournemouth
- Number: 19

Youth career
- 2005–2006: SV Diemen
- 2007–2016: Ajax

Senior career*
Years	Team	Apps	(Gls)
2016–2017	Jong Ajax	8	(2)
2016–2018	Ajax	44	(12)
2018–2023	Roma	53	(5)
2020–2021	→ RB Leipzig (loan)	19	(3)
2021–2022	→ Nice (loan)	27	(4)
2022–2023	→ Valencia (loan)	26	(6)
2023–	Bournemouth	95	(23)

International career^{‡}
2015–2016	Netherlands U17	10	(0)
2017	Netherlands U19	3	(0)
2017–2021	Netherlands U21	20	(5)
2018–	Netherlands	15	(0)
- * Club domestic league appearances and goals as of 23:08, 21 November 2026 (UTC) ‡ National team caps and goals as of 22:00, 16 November 2026 (UTC)

Justin Dean Kluivert (born 5 May 1999) is a Dutch professional footballer who plays as an attacking midfielder or winger for Premier League club Bournemouth and the Netherlands national team.

The son of former Dutch international footballer Patrick Kluivert and grandson of former Surinamese international footballer Kenneth Kluivert, Justin began his career at Ajax, coming through the youth system. After playing for two seasons with the Dutch side, he moved to Italian side Roma in 2018. He has also represented the Netherlands internationally, first at youth level from 2013 before making his senior debut in 2018.

== Club career ==
=== Ajax ===
Born in Amsterdam, Kluivert came through the Ajax youth program, and had his first professional contract with Ajax. He made his Eerste Divisie debut with Jong Ajax on 16 September 2016 in a game against MVV, replacing Vince Gino Dekker in the 67th minute, in a 1–0 away loss. He also played in the 2016–17 UEFA Youth League, in which he scored in a 2–0 group stage win at PAOK on 2 November.

Kluivert made his first team debut in the Eredivisie on 15 January 2017 in a 1–3 away win against PEC Zwolle, when he replaced Amin Younes in the 39th minute. He scored his first Eredivisie goal on 19 March in an away match against Excelsior, exactly ten years and one day after his father's last career goal. The match ended in a 1–1 draw. He made six appearances in the 2016–17 UEFA Europa League, and was an unused substitute in the final, a 2–0 loss to Manchester United in Stockholm.

On 26 November 2017, Kluivert opened his account for the season with a hat-trick in a 5–1 home win over Roda JC.

=== Roma ===
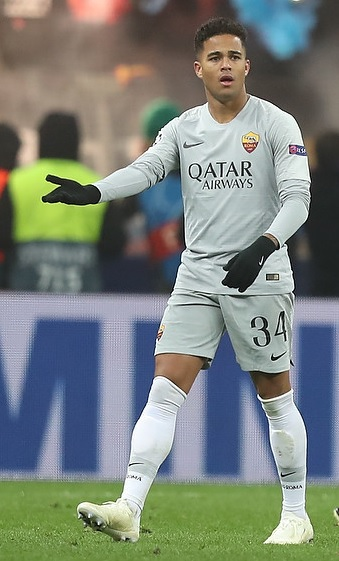
Kluivert playing for Roma in 2018

On 12 June 2018, Kluivert moved to Italian club Roma, following a telephone call made by Roma legend Francesco Totti to his father, for €18.75 million. He became the fifth Dutch player ever to represent the Italian side. Kluivert chose the number 34 shirt at Roma as a support for his good friend and former teammate Abdelhak Nouri, who wore it at Ajax; Nouri suffered a career-ending cardiac arrhythmia attack in 2017.

Kluivert became the youngest Roma player to score in the UEFA Champions League after scoring the fourth goal in a 5–0 home victory against Viktoria Plzeň on 3 October 2018. It was his first goal for the Giallorossi, and he dedicated it to Nouri. On 16 December, he scored for the first time in the Serie A in a 3–2 home win over Genoa.

For the 2019–20 season, Kluivert changed his shirt number to 99, representing the year he was born.

==== Loan to RB Leipzig ====
On 5 October 2020, Kluivert joined Bundesliga club RB Leipzig on a season-long loan. On 5 December, he scored his first Bundesliga goal in a 3–3 away draw against Bayern Munich. On 8 December, he scored a goal in a 3–2 win over Manchester United in the 2020–21 UEFA Champions League.

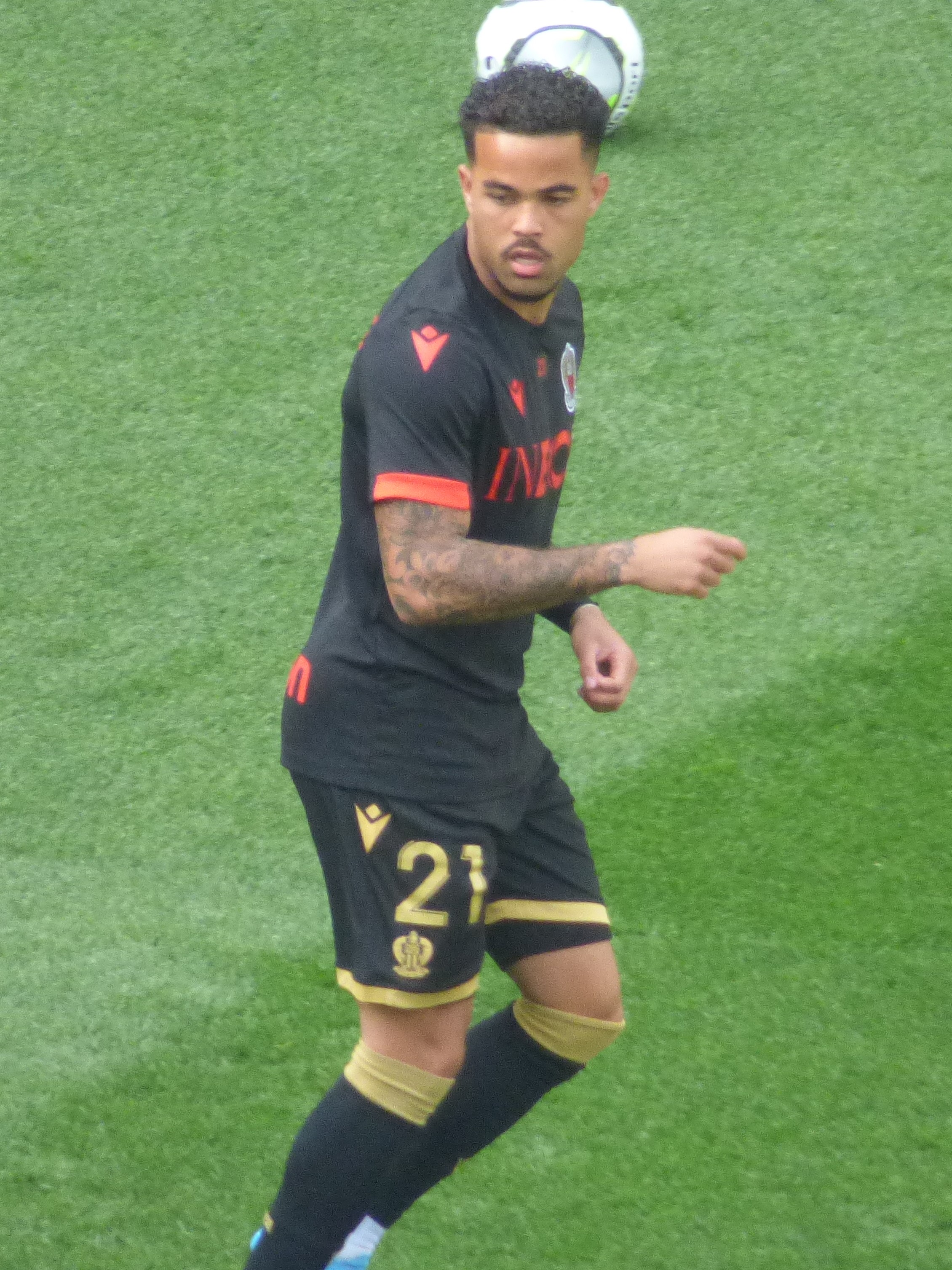
Kluivert with Nice in 2022

==== Loan to Nice ====
On 20 July 2021, Kluivert joined French Ligue 1 club Nice on season-long loan with an option to buy.

==== Loan to Valencia ====
On 1 September 2022, Kluivert signed for Spanish club Valencia on loan for the 2022–23 season. A few days earlier, he was denied a work permit in England which cancelled his transfer to Fulham.

=== Bournemouth ===
On 23 June 2023, Premier League club Bournemouth announced the signing of Kluivert for an undisclosed fee, reported to be around €11 million + €1.5 million in add-ons. On 12 August, he made his debut for the club, as a substitute, in a 1–1 league draw at home to West Ham United.

On 1 November 2023, Kluivert scored his first goal for Bournemouth in a 2–1 loss to Liverpool in the fourth round of the EFL Cup. On 25 November, he scored his first Premier League goal, in a 3–1 victory away at Sheffield United. By doing so, Kluivert became just the third player, after Florin Răducioiu and Stevan Jovetić, to score in every Big Five league, and the first to score in every Big Five league as well as the Eredivisie.

On 30 November 2024, Kluivert became the first player to score a hat-trick of penalties in a Premier League match, as Bournemouth defeated Wolverhampton Wanderers 4–2. It was the first time in 67 years that the feat had been achieved in the English top division since Ken Barnes for Manchester City in 1957, and the fourth time ever.

On 18 January 2025, Kluivert scored another hat-trick, this time in open-play, as Bournemouth defeated Newcastle United 4–1, ending the latter's nine-game winning streak and stopping them from breaking their club record for the most consecutive wins. His outstanding performance earned him the EA SPORTS Player of the Month award, making him the second Bournemouth player after Dominic Solanke to claim the award, after scoring five goals and providing two assists in the month. Kluivert finished the 2024–25 season with a personal-best return of 13 goals in all competitions and was named Bournemouth's Junior Player of the Season.

In January 2026, Bournemouth announced that Kluivert would undergo knee surgery after sustaining an injury against Arsenal. He returned to action later that season in the last home match against Manchester City.

== International career ==
At the 2016 Under 17 Euros in Azerbaijan, Kluivert played throughout the tournament in which the Netherlands reached the semi-finals.

Kluivert earned his first call-up to the senior team in March 2018 for the friendlies against England and Portugal. He made his debut on 26 March in a 3–0 win over the reigning European champions Portugal at the Stade de Genève, replacing Memphis Depay for the final 12 minutes of the match.

On 27 May 2026, Kluivert was named in the Netherlands' squad for the 2026 FIFA World Cup.

== Personal life ==
Justin Kluivert is the son of former Dutch international footballer Patrick Kluivert and is a grandson of former Surinamese international footballer Kenneth Kluivert. He is also of Curaçaoan descent through his paternal grandmother. Kluivert has three brothers, including footballers Ruben and Shane, who are plying their trade with Lyon and Barcelona Atlètic respectively. The other brother, Quincy, most recently played for Zeeburgia.

== Career statistics ==
=== Club ===
As of match played 21 November 2026

Appearances and goals by club, season and competition
Club	Season	League			National cup (Note: Includes KNVB Cup, Coppa Italia, DFB-Pokal, Coupe de France, Copa del Rey, FA Cup)		League cup (Note: Includes EFL Cup)		Europe		Other		Total	
Club	Season	Division	Apps	Goals	Apps	Goals	Apps	Goals	Apps	Goals	Apps	Goals	Apps	Goals
Jong Ajax	2016–17	Eerste Divisie	8	2	—		—		—		—		8	2
Ajax	2016–17	Eredivisie	14	2	0	0	—		6 (Note: Appearances in UEFA Europa League)	0	—		20	2
Ajax	2017–18	Eredivisie	30	10	2	1	—		4 (Note: Two appearances in UEFA Champions League, two appearances in UEFA Europa League)	0	—		36	11
Ajax	Total		44	12	2	1	—		10	0	—		56	13
Roma	2018–19	Serie A	29	1	1	0	—		5 (Note: Appearances in UEFA Champions League)	1	—		35	2
Roma	2019–20	Serie A	22	4	2	0	—		7	3	—		31	7
Roma	2020–21	Serie A	2	0	—		—		—		—		2	0
Roma	Total		53	5	3	0	—		12	4	—		68	9
RB Leipzig (loan)	2020–21	Bundesliga	19	3	1	0	—		7	1	—		27	4
Nice (loan)	2021–22	Ligue 1	27	4	4	2	—		—		—		31	6
Valencia (loan)	2022–23	La Liga	26	6	2	2	—		—		1 (Note: Appearance in Supercopa de España)	0	29	8
Bournemouth	2023–24	Premier League	32	7	2	1	2	1	—		—		36	9
Bournemouth	2024–25	Premier League	34	12	4	1	1	0	—		—		39	13
Bournemouth	2025–26	Premier League	20	2	0	0	1	0	—		—		21	2
Bournemouth	2026–27	Premier League	9	2	0	0	2	0	3	2	—		14	4
Bournemouth	Total		95	23	6	2	6	1	3	2	—		110	28
Career total			272	55	18	7	6	1	32	7	1	0	329	70

=== International ===
As of match played 16 November 2026

Appearances and goals by national team and year
National team	Year	Apps	Goals
Netherlands	2018	2	0
Netherlands	2024	1	0
Netherlands	2025	8	0
Netherlands	2026	4	0
Total		15	0

== Honours ==
Ajax

- UEFA Europa League runner-up: 2016–17

Nice

- Coupe de France runner-up: 2021–22

Individual

- AFC Ajax Talent of the Future (Sjaak Swart Award): 2016–17
- Premier League Player of the Month: January 2025
