= Igor Zaniolo =

Italian footballer (born 1973)

Personal information
- Full name: Igor Zaniolo
- Date of birth: 12 March 1973 (age 53)
- Place of birth: Genoa, Italy
- Height: 1.86 m (6 ft 1 in)
- Position: Forward

Youth career
- –1992: Sampdoria

Senior career*
Years	Team	Apps	(Gls)
1992–1994	Alessandria	25	(2)
1994–1995	Crevalcore	12	(1)
1995–1996	Aosta	20	(7)
1996–1997	Sanremese	28	(17)
1997–2001	Spezia	105	(37)
2001–2002	Cosenza	27	(13)
2002–2003	Ternana	28	(2)
2003–2004	Messina	39	(6)
2004–2005	Salernitana	26	(5)
2005–2006	Genoa	13	(2)
2006–2007	Cisco Roma	23	(3)
2007–2008	Carrarese	26	(7)
2008	Novese	3	(2)
2008–2010	Lavagnese	43	(16)
2010–2012	Massese	29	(23)
2012–2013	Real Valdivara	43	(3)
Total		474	(146)
- * Club domestic league appearances and goals

Igor Zaniolo (born 12 March 1973) is an Italian former footballer who played as a forward mostly in Serie B and Serie C.

== Career ==
Zaniolo spent several seasons with Spezia in Serie C, scoring 34 goals in 104 league appearances. In the 2001–02 season, he made his Serie B debut on 26 August 2001 for Cosenza in a home match against Cittadella (2–1). He owed much of his early success to the Cosenza side and coach Luigi De Rosa, under whom he helped the club avoid relegation, scoring 13 goals in 27 matches.

He also played in Serie B for Ternana, Salernitana, and Messina under manager Bortolo Mutti, achieving promotion to Serie A in the 2003–04 season. Across his time in Serie B, he made a total of 120 appearances and scored 26 goals.

Starting from the 2005–06 season, he returned to Serie C1 with Genoa, earning promotion to Serie B. He later played for Cisco Roma and Carrarese in Serie C2, and in the 2008–09 season he appeared for both Novese and Lavagnese in Serie D.

In July 2010, he joined Massese in the Eccellenza Tuscany, where he scored 17 goals as the team finished second in Group A. He remained with the club for the following season, winning promotion to Serie D through the play-offs. After the promotion, he chose to stay in Eccellenza, signing for newly promoted Real Valdivara.

On 27 February 2013, during a home match against Sestrese, he served as acting manager due to the absence of head coach Davide Marselli; the team lost 1–2. On 27 October 2013, he retired from playing football.

== Personal life ==
He is married to Francesca, with whom he has two children. His eldest son, Nicolò, also became a professional footballer.
