= Mert Çetin =

Turkish footballer

Personal information
- Full name: Yıldırım Mert Çetin
- Date of birth: 1 January 1997 (age 29)
- Place of birth: Çankaya, Ankara, Turkey
- Height: 1.89 m (6 ft 2 in)
- Position: Centre-back

Team information
- Current team: Erzincanspor
- Number: 4

Youth career
- 2008–2016: Gençlerbirliği

Senior career*
Years	Team	Apps	(Gls)
2016–2017	Hacettepe	30	(1)
2017–2019	Gençlerbirliği	27	(1)
2019–2021	Roma	6	(0)
2020–2021	→ Hellas Verona (loan)	6	(0)
2021–2024	Hellas Verona	2	(0)
2022	→ Kayserispor (loan)	10	(1)
2022–2023	→ Lecce (loan)	1	(0)
2023	→ Adana Demirspor (loan)	10	(0)
2023–2024	→ Ankaragücü (loan)	18	(0)
2024–2025	Ankaragücü	27	(0)
2026	Boluspor	3	(0)
2026–	Erzincanspor	5	(0)

International career^{‡}
2018	Turkey U21	3	(0)
2019–	Turkey	2	(0)
- * Club domestic league appearances and goals as of 11 October 2026 ‡ National team caps and goals as of 11 November 2020

Yıldırım Mert Çetin (born 1 January 1997) is a Turkish professional footballer who plays as a centre-back for TFF 2. Lig club Erzincanspor. He represented the Turkey national team.

== Club career ==
Çetin made his professional debut for Gençlerbirliği in a 2–1 Süper Lig loss to Kayserispor on 19 November 2017.

On 16 August 2019, Çetin joined Italian Serie A club Roma. He was sent on a one-year loan to Hellas Verona on 25 August 2020, with an option to purchase.

On 15 January 2022, Hellas Verona announced that Çetin had been loaned to Turkish club Kayserispor.

On 6 August 2022, Çetin joined Lecce on loan with an option to buy.

On 19 January 2023, Çetin was loaned to Adana Demirspor, with an option to buy.

On 10 July 2023, Hellas Verona announced that Çetin had been sent on a season-long loan to Ankaragücü, with a future option to buy.

== International career ==
He made his debut for Turkey national team on 17 November 2019 in a Euro 2020 qualifier against Andorra, substituting Merih Demiral in the 80th minute.

== Career statistics ==
=== Club ===
As of match played 23 August 2024

Appearances and goals by club, season and competition
Club	Season	League			National Cup (Note: Includes Turkish Cup, Coppa Italia)		Europe		Other		Total	
Club	Season	Division	Apps	Goals	Apps	Goals	Apps	Goals	Apps	Goals	Apps	Goals
Hacettepe	2016–17	TFF Second League	30	1	1	0	—		—		31	1
Gençlerbirliği	2017–18	Süper Lig	2	0	4	0	—		—		6	0
Gençlerbirliği	2018–19	TFF First League	25	1	1	0	—		—		26	1
Gençlerbirliği	Total		27	1	5	0	—		—		32	1
Roma	2019–20	Serie A	6	0	0	0	0	0	—		6	0
Hellas Verona (loan)	2020–21	Serie A	6	0	1	0	—		—		7	0
Hellas Verona	2021–22	Serie A	2	0	1	0	—		—		3	0
Hellas Verona	Total		8	0	2	0	—		—		10	0
Kayserispor (loan)	2021–22	Süper Lig	10	1	3	0	—		—		13	1
Lecce (loan)	2022–23	Serie A	1	0	0	0	—		—		1	0
Adana Demirspor (loan)	2022–23	Süper Lig	10	0	0	0	—		—		10	0
Ankaragücü (loan)	2023–24	Süper Lig	18	0	5	0	—		—		23	0
Career total			110	3	16	0	0	0	—		126	3
