= Ruben Kluivert =

Dutch footballer (born 2001)

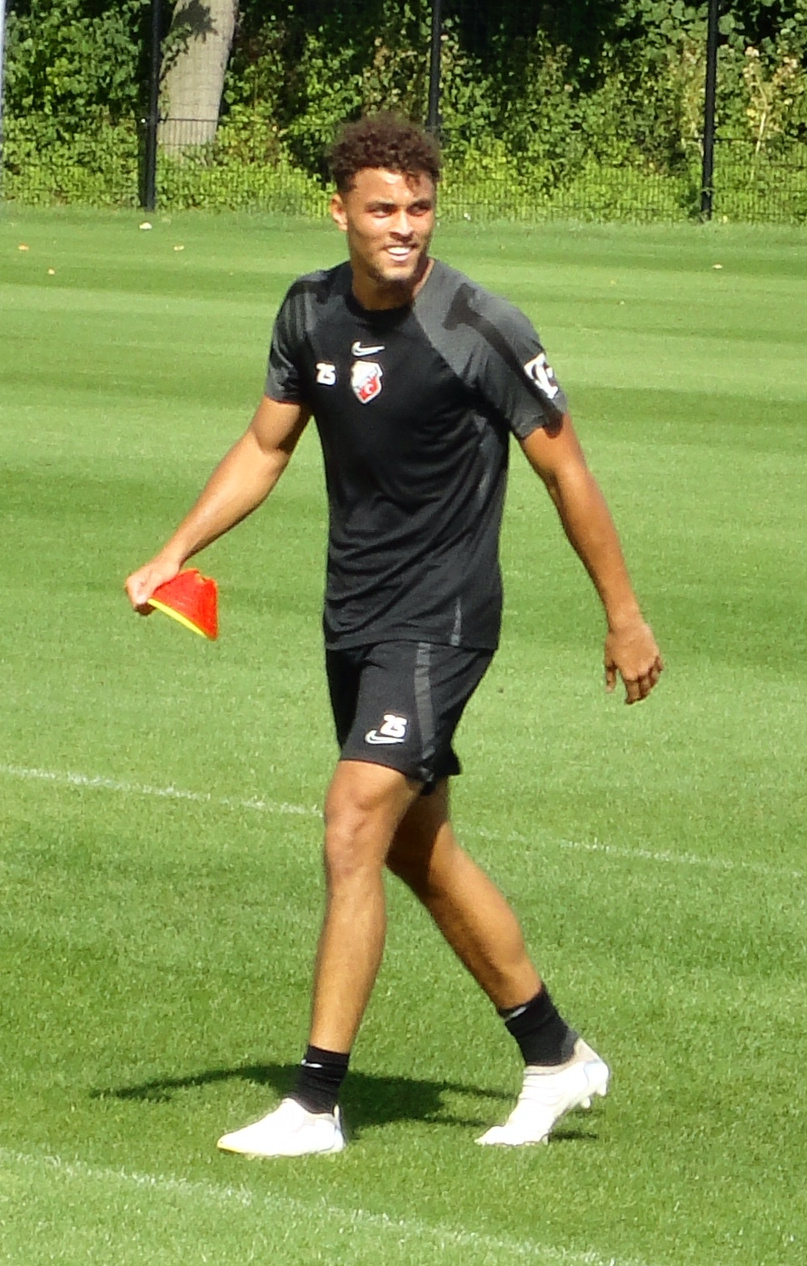
- Kluivert with Utrecht in 2022

Personal information
- Full name: Ruben Caine Kluivert
- Date of birth: 21 May 2001 (age 25)
- Place of birth: Amsterdam, Netherlands
- Height: 1.87 m (6 ft 2 in)
- Positions: Centre-back; left-back

Team information
- Current team: Lyon
- Number: 21

Youth career
- –2018: AFC
- 2018–2020: Utrecht

Senior career*
Years	Team	Apps	(Gls)
2020–2023	Jong Utrecht	52	(2)
2022–2023	Utrecht	14	(0)
2023–2024	Dordrecht	20	(0)
2024–2025	Casa Pia	21	(1)
2025–	Lyon	29	(2)
- * Club domestic league appearances and goals as of 12 November 2026

Ruben Caine Kluivert (born 21 May 2001) is a Dutch professional footballer who plays as a centre-back or left-back for Ligue 1 club Lyon.

== Career ==
=== Early years ===
Born in Amsterdam, Kluivert began playing as a youth for local club AFC before moving to Utrecht, where he made his senior debut with the reserve team in the Eerste Divisie. In December 2019, at the age of 18, Kluivert signed his first professional contract with Utrecht, initially running until 2022. On 16 March 2022, he extended his contract until 2024 with an option for an additional season. He made his first-team debut on 11 May 2022 in the Eredivisie as an added-time substitute for Willem Janssen in a 2–2 home draw with AZ.

In September 2023, after five seasons at Utrecht, he left the club due to limited first-team prospects as judged by the technical management.

=== Dordrecht (2023-2024) ===
On 1 September 2023, Kluivert signed a two-year contract with Dordrecht.

=== Casa Pia (2024-2025) ===
In late June 2024, he joined Primeira Liga side Casa Pia. During the 2024–2025 season, he played 24 matches (21 in the league and 3 in cup competitions) and scored his first professional goal on 25 October 2024 in a 1–0 victory over Nacional.

=== Lyon (since 2025) ===
On 25 July 2025, Kluivert joined Ligue 1 side Lyon for a fee of €3.78 million and signed a contract until June 2030.

==== 2025-2026 season ====
His early months in France were marked by adaptation difficulties. Initially deployed as a right-back, he faced criticism for his inexperience and committed several defensive errors. On 2 October 2025, he scored his first goal for the club in a 2–0 win over RB Salzburg in the Europa League. His situation shifted in January 2026. Taking advantage of the absences of Moussa Niakhaté and Clinton Mata (both away at the AFCON), he was repositioned to his natural role as a centre-back. He became a fixture in Paulo Fonseca's starting eleven, contributing to a streak of eight consecutive victories, notably against Monaco, Lille, and Young Boys in European competition. However, his performances remained marked by lapses in concentration. On 25 January 2026, during a 5–2 win against Metz, he scored his first Ligue 1 goal but also committed a direct turnover error that led to an opposition goal. On 2 February 2026, he was named for the first time in the L'Équipe Team of the Day following a 1–0 victory over Lille. In early February 2026, he suffered an injury that sidelined him for several matches.

== Style of play ==
Kluivert is a versatile defender capable of playing as a centre-back or lateral. He is distinguished by his pace and physical strength in duels. While he is effective in offensive heading situations, his profile is noted for lapses in concentration and technical inconsistency in his clearances.

== Personal life ==
Kluivert hails from a footballing family. His grandfather Kenneth played for Surinamese team Robinhood and moved to the Netherlands in 1970. His father, Patrick, played for European clubs including Ajax and Barcelona, and was a long-time Dutch international. His older brother Justin is also a professional footballer for AFC Bournemouth and the Netherlands. He has two younger brothers, Quincy and Shane, who play for Zeeburgia and Barcelona U18 respectively.

== Career statistics ==
As of match played 18 October 2026

Appearances and goals by club, season and competition
Club	Season	League			National cup (Note: Includes KNVB Cup, Taça de Portugal, Coupe de France)		Continental		Other		Total	
Club	Season	Division	Apps	Goals	Apps	Goals	Apps	Goals	Apps	Goals	Apps	Goals
Jong Utrecht	2019–20	Eerste Divisie	2	0	–		–		–		2	0
Jong Utrecht	2020–21	Eerste Divisie	21	1	–		–		–		21	1
Jong Utrecht	2021–22	Eerste Divisie	16	1	–		–		–		16	1
Jong Utrecht	2022–23	Eerste Divisie	13	0	–		–		–		13	0
Jong Utrecht	Total		52	2	–		–		–		52	2
Utrecht	2021–22	Eredivisie	1	0	0	0	–		0	0	1	0
Utrecht	2022–23	Eredivisie	13	0	1	0	–		–		14	0
Utrecht	Total		14	0	1	0	–		–		15	0
Dordrecht	2023–24	Eerste Divisie	20	0	0	0	—		2 (Note: Appearances in Eerste Divisie promotion play-off)	0	22	0
Casa Pia	2024–25	Primeira Liga	21	1	3	0	—		—		24	1
Lyon	2025–26	Ligue 1	16	1	2	0	6 (Note: Appearances in UEFA Europa League)	1	–		24	2
Lyon	2026–27	Ligue 1	3	0	0	0	6 (Note: Four appearances in UEFA Champions League, two appearances in UEFA Europa League)	0	–		9	0
Lyon	Total		19	1	2	0	12	1	—		33	2
Career total			128	4	4	0	12	1	2	0	146	5
