= Shane Kluivert =

Dutch footballer (born 2007)

Personal information
- Full name: Shane Patrick Kluivert
- Date of birth: 24 September 2007 (age 19)
- Place of birth: Zaandam, Netherlands
- Height: 1.79 m (5 ft 10 in)
- Position: Winger

Team information
- Current team: Barcelona B
- Number: 11

Youth career
- 2013–2016: Buitenveldert
- 2016–2017: Paris Saint-Germain
- 2017–2026: Barcelona

Senior career*
Years	Team	Apps	(Gls)
2025–	Barcelona B	21	(2)

International career^{‡}
2022–2023	Netherlands U16	6	(0)
2023–	Netherlands U17	2	(0)
- * Club domestic league appearances and goals as of 15 May 2026 ‡ National team caps and goals as of 27 January 2024

Shane Patrick Kluivert (born 24 September 2007) is a Dutch professional footballer who plays as a left winger for Segunda Federación club Barcelona Atlètic.

== Club career ==
Born in Zaandam to Patrick Kluivert and Rossana Lima, Kluivert started his career with Amsterdam-based side Buitenveldert, before a move to French side Paris Saint-Germain, where his father was serving as technical director. In August 2017, he followed in the footsteps of his father by signing for Spanish side Barcelona.

On 15 October 2024, he was named by English newspaper The Guardian as one of the best players born in 2007 worldwide.

== International career ==
Kluivert has represented the Netherlands at under-16 level, receiving his first call-up in September 2022. He remains eligible to represent Suriname.

== Personal life ==
=== Family ===
Kluivert hails from a footballing family, with his father, Patrick Kluivert, having notably played for numerous top clubs across Europe, as well as the Netherlands national football team. In addition to this, his grandfather is former Surinamese international Kenneth Kluivert, and his half-brothers, Justin, Quincy and Ruben, have all pursued careers in professional football, with Justin also representing the Netherlands at international level. Justin, Quincy and Ruben currently ply their trade in football with AFC Bournemouth, AVV Zeeburgia and Olympique Lyonnais respectively.

=== Cooking ===
As well as football, Kluivert also has an interest in cooking, running Instagram and YouTube accounts dedicated to this passion. He has had two cooking books published; the first in 2018, called Koken met Shane (Cooking with Shane), and the second in 2020, called Vega met Shane (Vegetarian with Shane).

=== Sponsorship ===
In July 2017, he signed a contract with American sportswear manufacturer Nike. At the age of nine, he was the youngest European athlete with a clothing contract at the time. He extended this contract in 2022.

== Honours ==
Barcelona

- UEFA Youth League: 2024–25
