= Patrick Kluivert =

Dutch football player and manager (born 1976)

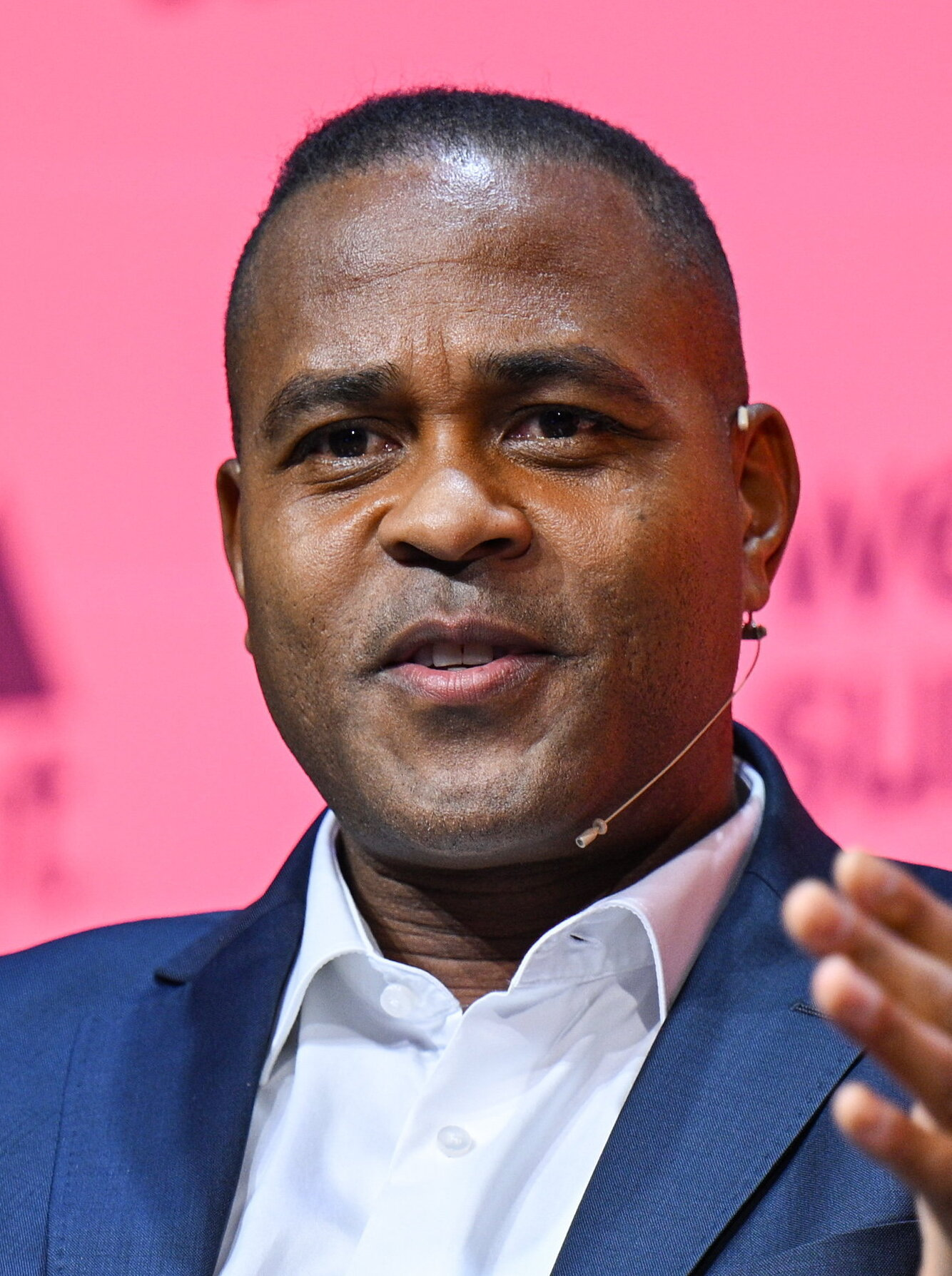
- Kluivert in 2024

Personal information
- Full name: Patrick Stephan Kluivert
- Date of birth: 1 July 1976 (age 50)
- Place of birth: Amsterdam, Netherlands
- Height: 1.91 m (6 ft 3 in)
- Position: Striker

Youth career
- 1983–1984: Schellingwoude
- 1984–1994: Ajax

Senior career*
Years	Team	Apps	(Gls)
1994–1997	Ajax	70	(39)
1997–1998	AC Milan	27	(6)
1998–2004	Barcelona	182	(90)
2004–2005	Newcastle United	25	(6)
2005–2006	Valencia	10	(1)
2006–2007	PSV	16	(3)
2007–2008	Lille	14	(4)
Total		343	(149)

International career
1990–1991	Netherlands U16	2	(0)
1991–1992	Netherlands U17	10	(2)
1992	Netherlands U18	3	(2)
1992–1994	Netherlands U19	20	(6)
1994–2004	Netherlands	79	(40)

Managerial career
- 2011–2013: Jong Twente
- 2015–2016: Curaçao
- 2021: Curaçao (caretaker)
- 2023: Adana Demirspor
- 2025: Indonesia
Medal record
Men's football
Representing Netherlands (as assistant manager)
FIFA World Cup
Third place	2014	Team
- * Club domestic league appearances and goals

Patrick Stephan Kluivert (Dutch pronunciation: [ˈpɛtrɪ ˈklœyvərt]; born 1 July 1976) is a Dutch football coach and former player. As a player, he played as a striker for Ajax, Barcelona and the Netherlands national team. In 2004, he was named in the FIFA 100, a list of the 125 greatest living footballers chosen by Pelé as part of FIFA's centenary observances.

He was part of Ajax's Golden Generation of the 1990s, scoring the winner in the 1995 UEFA Champions League Final at the age of 18. He spent six years with Spanish club Barcelona, where he scored 124 goals from 249 appearances. He formed a successful partnership with Rivaldo, and won the Spanish La Liga championship of 1999.

Kluivert played for the Netherlands national team from 1994 to 2004. With 40 goals in 79 appearances, he is the fourth highest goalscorer for the Oranje. He played in three European Championships and the 1998 FIFA World Cup, and was joint top scorer at Euro 2000, where he scored five goals.

Kluivert began his coaching career as an assistant at AZ and NEC, as well as the Brisbane Roar, before managing Jong Twente to a national title in the Dutch reserves league. He was an assistant to Louis van Gaal with the Dutch team that finished third at the 2014 FIFA World Cup. In 2015, he took over as head coach of the Curaçao national team. He then served as a sporting director for Paris Saint-Germain, as well as coaching the Ajax A1 (under-19) team in 2016 and assisting Clarence Seedorf for the Cameroon national team in 2018. After leaving Cameroon in July 2019, he served as the academy director of Barcelona until his brief return to Curaçao as interim coach in May 2021. Kluivert was head coach of Turkish side Adana Demirspor in 2023 and the Indonesia national team in 2025.

== Early life ==
Kluivert was born on 1 July 1976 in Amsterdam, Netherlands. His father, Kenneth Kluivert, was a professional football player from Suriname, and his mother was born in Curaçao. Kluivert learned to play football on the street. After a year at football club Schellingwoude, he joined the Ajax Youth Academy at the age of seven.

He played several different positions as a youth, including as a defender. He was strong in technique, football intelligence, and speed, but was considered too impulsive. Kluivert played for the Dutch national teams under-15, under-16 and under-17.

== Club career ==
=== Ajax ===
Kluivert was part of Ajax's Golden Generation of the 1990s. He made his debut in the senior team of Ajax on 21 August 1994 at the age of 18 in the Dutch Supercup win against the old arch rival Feyenoord, in which he scored his first goal. He went on to top score for Ajax in the 1994–95 Eredivisie with 18 goals in 25 appearances, as Louis van Gaal's team won the Dutch championship without losing a match.

The 1994–95 season also saw Kluivert make his mark – along with a host of youngsters from the Ajax youth academy, including Edgar Davids, Clarence Seedorf and Edwin van der Sar – on the European stage with a triumph in the UEFA Champions League. Kluivert came off the bench to score an 85th-minute winner in the 1995 Champions League Final against AC Milan in Vienna, Austria. He was the youngest player to score in a Champions League final, being only 18 years, 10 months and 23 days.

He was again the top scorer for Ajax in 1995–96, with 15 goals in 28 appearances, as the club won five trophies, including the Eredivisie. He scored the winning goal in extra time of the season opening Dutch Supercup against Feyenoord, and also scored the team's away goal in the 5–1 aggregate win over Real Zaragoza in the 1995 UEFA Super Cup.

On 28 November 1995, Kluivert was the only Ajax player to miss his kick in the 4–3 penalty shootout win over Grêmio in Tokyo that saw de Godenzonen win the Intercontinental Cup. Kluivert was also in excellent form during Ajax's defence of their Champions League trophy, scoring in away wins at Real Madrid and Borussia Dortmund, but a knee injury prevented him from participating for the full 90 minutes in the team's loss to Juventus in the 1996 UEFA Champions League Final.

At the end of an injury hit 1996–97 season, in which he made only 17 league appearances, Kluivert joined AC Milan on a Bosman transfer, after rejecting Ajax's offer of a new contract. He ended his spell in Amsterdam with 39 goals in 70 Eredivisie matches.

=== AC Milan ===
Kluivert's career at Milan started well, with the striker scoring a sensational goal against Juventus in the Trofeo Luigi Berlusconi. However, he spent only one season at the San Siro, scoring six times in 27 Serie A matches, as the Rossoneri finished in tenth place.

=== Barcelona ===
On 28 August 1998, an hour before the transfer deadline, Kluivert signed a four-year contract with Barcelona for a fee of £8.75 million. Kluivert was reunited with Louis van Gaal, a mentor from his days at Ajax. Kluivert scored 16 league goals and formed a successful partnership with Rivaldo, which enabled Barça to defend the Spanish La Liga in 1998–99. The following season was also a successful one for Kluivert. Although Barcelona failed to win a third consecutive league title, Kluivert finished the season as the club's top scorer with 15 league goals. Kluivert went on to be the top scorer twice more in his next four seasons at the Camp Nou, but the team endured a period of five years without a major trophy after their title success in 1999.

In the summer of 2004, Kluivert was one of four Dutch players released by Barcelona. He ended his career at Barça with 124 goals from 249 appearances.

=== Newcastle United ===
Kluivert joined Newcastle United on a free transfer in July 2004. He stated that his reasons for joining Newcastle was due to the overwhelming reaction he received whilst playing for Barcelona against Newcastle during a pre season friendly, as well as teaming up with Newcastle's star players, such as Alan Shearer. Kluivert scored some classy and crucial goals at home and away from St James' Park, namely in winning strikes against both Chelsea and Tottenham Hotspur in the FA Cup, with both games ending 1–0 to Newcastle. He also scored away against Olympiakos in a 3–1 win in the first leg of the round of 16 of the UEFA Cup. Kluivert eventually scored five goals in all in that season's competition. Altogether, he scored 13 goals in his debut season, being Newcastle's overall second highest goal scorer for the 2004–05 season. Despite these feats, Kluivert was released by Newcastle in the summer of 2005.

=== Valencia ===
Kluivert decided to return to Spain to play at the Mestalla for Valencia. During the 2005–06 season, Valencia finished third in La Liga, thus qualifying for the Champions League after a one-season absence. Kluivert played for a total of 202 minutes, as he spent most of the season injured.

=== PSV ===
Despite widespread rumours that Kluivert was to return home to Johan Cruyff Arena, Kluivert's return to the Eredivisie was to be with PSV, with whom he signed a one-year deal in 2006. Just as with his debut for Ajax, Kluivert made his PSV debut against Feyenoord in a 2–1 win, coming on as a substitute. After that, he had two injuries during the first half of the season, which limited his playing time. In a game against Ajax at the Philips Stadion, Kluivert refused to celebrate after scoring a goal against his former club. He was eventually released in July 2007.

=== Lille ===
On 25 July 2007, Kluivert joined French side Lille.

== International career ==
Kluivert made his full international debut on 16 November 1994 in a European qualifier against the Czech Republic, replacing Youri Mulder after 13 minutes of a 0–0 draw in Rotterdam. In his second match, on 29 March 1995, he replaced Ronald de Boer after 77 minutes, and seven minutes later scored his first international goal to wrap up a 4–0 home qualifying win over Malta.

In December 1995, Kluivert scored both goals in the Netherlands' 2–0 UEFA Euro 1996 qualifying play-off win over the Republic of Ireland at Anfield, to qualify the Oranje for UEFA Euro 1996. Kluivert missed most of the tournament with a knee injury, but he scored against the host nation England, enabling the Netherlands to qualify for the knock-out round over Scotland on goals scored. There, they lost in a penalty shootout to France after a 0–0 draw.

At the 1998 FIFA World Cup, Kluivert was sent off against Belgium by referee Pierluigi Collina, after elbowing Lorenzo Staelens. He made amends when selected to play against Argentina in the quarter-finals of the same tournament, where he scored the opening goal. In the next round, he scored a late equalising goal from a header to draw his team level with Brazil in the semi-final, although the Netherlands went on to lose the penalty shootout.

At UEFA Euro 2000 held in the Netherlands and Belgium, Kluivert scored a hat-trick in the 6–1 quarter-final demolition of Yugoslavia; he was originally credited with four goals, but the third was later re-attributed as an own goal by Yugoslavia's Dejan Govedarica, after Kluivert admitted not getting a touch on Paul Bosvelt's cross. Had all four goals stood, Kluivert would have been the first player to score four times in a European Championship match. The Dutch were eliminated in the semi-finals by Italy on penalties; he missed one of their two spot-kicks in normal time, but did score in the penalty shoot-out. With five goals in as many games, he claimed the Golden Boot jointly with Savo Milošević.

Kluivert would once again enter UEFA Euro 2004 wearing the famous #9 jersey for his country, with the Dutch reaching the semi-finals of the tournament.

As well as from being left out of the 2006 FIFA World Cup squad by coach Marco van Basten, Kluivert was not called up to play in any of the qualifying games leading up to the World Cup either. This was due to the fact that he suffered persistent injuries, which prevented him from playing for his club during the 2005–06 season. Kluivert was the all-time leading goalscorer for the Dutch national team with 40 goals, until he was surpassed by Robin van Persie in 2013.

== Style of play ==
Although tall in stature, Kluivert possessed quick feet and an impressive first touch. Similar to Brazilian footballer Ronaldo, he often used several feints, namely the Cruyff turn, to great effect to go past defenders, due to his pace, strong technical skills, close control and football intelligence. Kluivert also utilised his height, power and strong physique to dominate aerial balls, and was considered to possess one of the best headers in the then-contemporary game. A versatile player, with an eye for goal, he also possessed good vision, and was capable of playing in several other positions across the pitch. Despite his ability, he drew criticism for his character and attitude throughout his career.

== Coaching career ==
=== Early career ===
On 29 April 2008, Dutch media reported that Kluivert would take part in the coaching course of the Dutch Football Association (KNVB) to become a professional football coach. The KNVB requires that all coaching badge candidates complete this sort of apprenticeship.

On 18 July 2008, it was reported on the football website Goal that Kluivert would be spending the 2008–09 season as a member of the backroom coaching staff of Eredivisie club AZ. Later on, in an interview on Soccer AM, Kluivert revealed his role involved coaching the strikers at AZ.

In January 2010, Kluivert took a position as an assistant coach for Australian A-League side Brisbane Roar under head coach Ange Postecoglou.

On 19 May 2010, Kluivert told journalists he ruled out a comeback as a football player. From August 2010 onwards, he was an assistant coach for NEC, coaching the strikers. In the 2011–12 season, he moved on and took charge of the Twente youth and reserve team, coaching Jong Twente to a national title in the Beloften Eredivisie.

In August 2012, Kluivert joined the Netherlands national team coaching staff to work under head coach Louis van Gaal. Kluivert's time with the Netherlands culminated with a third-place finish in the 2014 FIFA World Cup campaign.

=== Curaçao ===
On 5 March 2015, it was announced that Kluivert would take over as manager of the Curaçao national football team for the 2018 FIFA World Cup qualification. Curaçao progressed through the first two qualifying rounds, defeating Montserrat and Cuba. On 8 September 2015, Curaçao were eliminated in the 2018 FIFA World Cup third qualifying round by El Salvador, losing 2–0 on aggregate score. Having helped the country to their best performance yet in World Cup qualifying, Kluivert announced his resignation as head coach on 10 September 2015. While pursuing other ventures, he remains a close advisor to the Curaçao Football Federation. On 24 February 2016, Kluivert announced his decision to remain head coach of Curaçao ahead of the teams' Caribbean Cup qualifying matches against the Dominican Republic and Barbados. On 2 May 2016, it was announced that Kluivert would take over as head coach of the Ajax A1 (under-19) selection ahead of the 2016–17 season, where he would coach his son Justin Kluivert, with the team having secured placement in the UEFA Youth League the previous year. Following his announcement to join Ajax, Kluivert remained head coach of Curaçao for round two of the Caribbean Cup qualifiers, where they faced Guyana and the U.S. Virgin Islands in group three. Curaçao won both their matches at home, defeating Guyana 5–2 and the U.S. Virgin Islands 7–0 in his final match in charge. On 14 July 2016, it was announced that Kluivert would no longer coach the under-19 team of Ajax, but that he would instead take over the position as director of football for French club Paris Saint-Germain. He expressed that his intention was to stay with Ajax, but that he could not refuse the offer made by PSG.

His efforts for the national team of Curaçao did not go without merit, as the team secured qualification for both the 2017 Caribbean Cup and the 2017 CONCACAF Gold Cup, where they would compete for the first time in forty years under the guidance of Remko Bicentini and Kluivert.

=== Assistant and interim duties ===
In August 2018, Kluivert became Seedorf's assistant at the Cameroon national football team; they were both relieved of their duties in July 2019.

Kluivert became the academy director of Barcelona only days after leaving Cameroon. However, the club announced in March 2021 that his contract would be allowed to expire in June.

In May 2021, Kluivert returned to the Curaçao national team on an interim basis, while compatriot Guus Hiddink recovered from COVID-19. In July, the team withdrew from the 2021 CONCACAF Gold Cup, due to an outbreak of the same virus.

=== Adana Demirspor ===
On 30 June 2023, Turkish club Adana Demirspor announced the appointment of Kluivert as their new manager by signing a two-year contract. On 4 December 2023, he parted ways with Adana Demirspor by mutual agreement.

=== Indonesia national team ===
Following Shin Tae-yong's dismissal, on 8 January 2025, the Football Association of Indonesia (PSSI) appointed Kluivert as head coach, with Alex Pastoor and Denny Landzaat assisting him on a contract until 2027. Indonesia's first match under Kluivert was a 1–5 away loss to Australia in 2026 FIFA World Cup qualification, followed by a 1–0 win at home to Bahrain. On 5 June 2025, Indonesia defeated China 1–0, their first win against the latter in 38 years, and advanced to the fourth round of World Cup qualification.

Indonesia was eliminated in that round after losses to Saudi Arabia (2–3) and Iraq (0–1). On 16 October 2025, Kluivert's contract with PSSI was terminated. He won three, drew one, and lost four of his fixtures.

== Personal life ==
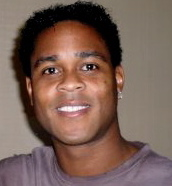
Kluivert in 2008

Kluivert is the second son of former football player Kenneth Kluivert, who played for SV Robinhood in the SVB Hoofdklasse and for the Suriname national team. His mother Lidwina Kluivert, was born in Willemstad, Curaçao, in the former Netherlands Antilles, to a Surinamese father and Curaçaoan mother. Lidwina died on 27 February 2023 from long-term health issues. His parents were married in Paramaribo, and both his elder siblings were born in Suriname, before the family emigrated to the Netherlands in 1970.

On 9 September 1995, Kluivert, then 19 years old and still playing for Ajax, was the driver in a car crash in Amsterdam, in which a 56-year-old man was killed and a passenger was seriously injured in a collision. Kluivert collided with a Ford Orion saloon while driving an uninsured BMW M3 sports car he had borrowed from a friend at a speed of approximately 104 km/h (64 mph) while in a 50 km/h (31 mph) residential zone. Though he denied a charge of causing death by dangerous driving, he was found guilty in court and sentenced to 240 hours of community service. The conviction meant that Kluivert needed special documentation to enter the United States when Barcelona played pre-season matches there in 2003.

He has four children: Quincy, Justin, Ruben and Shane. Justin, like his father, came through the Ajax youth setup, formerly played for Valencia and was capped for the Netherlands; he now plays for Premier League club Bournemouth.

== Career statistics ==
=== Club ===
Appearances and goals by club, season and competition
Club	Season	League			National cup (Note: Includes KNVB Cup, Coppa Italia, Copa del Rey, FA Cup, League Cup, Coupe de France)		League cup (Note: Includes Football League Cup)		Europe		Other		Total	
Club	Season	Division	Apps	Goals	Apps	Goals	Apps	Goals	Apps	Goals	Apps	Goals	Apps	Goals
Ajax	1994–95	Eredivisie	25	18	1	1	—		10 (Note: Appearances in UEFA Champions League)	2	1 (Note: Appearance in Dutch Supercup)	1	37	22
Ajax	1995–96	Eredivisie	28	15	2	1	—		8	5	4 (Note: One appearance and one goal in Dutch Supercup, two appearances and one goal in UEFA Super Cup, one appearance in Intercontinental Cup)	2	42	23
Ajax	1996–97	Eredivisie	17	6	1	0	—		4	2	—		22	8
Ajax	Total		70	39	4	2	—		22	9	5	3	101	53
AC Milan	1997–98	Serie A	27	6	6	3	—		—		—		33	9
Barcelona	1998–99	La Liga	35	15	3	1	—		—		—		38	16
Barcelona	1999–2000	La Liga	26	15	2	1	—		14	7	2 (Note: Appearances in Supercopa de España)	2	44	25
Barcelona	2000–01	La Liga	31	18	5	2	—		12 (Note: Four appearances and two goals in UEFA Champions League, eight appearances and three goals in UEFA Cup)	5	—		48	25
Barcelona	2001–02	La Liga	33	18	0	0	—		17	7	—		50	25
Barcelona	2002–03	La Liga	36	16	0	0	—		15	5	—		51	21
Barcelona	2003–04	La Liga	21	8	2	0	—		3 (Note: Appearances in UEFA Cup)	2	—		26	10
Barcelona	Total		182	90	12	4	—		61	26	2	2	257	122
Newcastle United	2004–05	Premier League	25	6	4	2	2	0	6	5	—		37	13
Valencia	2005–06	La Liga	10	1	1	0	—		5 (Note: Appearances in UEFA Intertoto Cup)	1	—		16	2
PSV	2006–07	Eredivisie	16	3	2	0	—		3	0	—		21	3
Lille	2007–08	Ligue 1	13	4	1	0	0	0	—		—		14	4
Career total			343	149	30	11	2	0	97	41	7	5	479	206

=== International ===
Appearances and goals by national team and year
National team	Year	Apps	Goals
Netherlands	1994	1	0
Netherlands	1995	5	3
Netherlands	1996	5	1
Netherlands	1997	5	2
Netherlands	1998	11	7
Netherlands	1999	8	4
Netherlands	2000	14	12
Netherlands	2001	9	4
Netherlands	2002	6	3
Netherlands	2003	11	4
Netherlands	2004	4	0
Total		79	40

Scores and results list the Netherlands' goal tally first, score column indicates score after each Kluivert goal.

List of international goals scored by Patrick Kluivert
No.	Date	Venue	Opponent	Score	Result	Competition
1	29 March 1995	De Kuip, Rotterdam, Netherlands	Malta	4–0	4–0	UEFA Euro 1996 qualifying
2	13 December 1995	Anfield, Liverpool, England	Republic of Ireland	1–0	2–0	UEFA Euro 1996 qualifying
3	13 December 1995	Anfield, Liverpool, England	Republic of Ireland	2–0	2–0	UEFA Euro 1996 qualifying
4	18 June 1996	Wembley Stadium, London, England	England	1–4	1–4	UEFA Euro 1996
5	29 March 1997	Amsterdam Arena, Amsterdam, Netherlands	San Marino	1–0	4–0	1998 FIFA World Cup qualification
6	6 September 1997	De Kuip, Rotterdam, Netherlands	Belgium	2–0	3–1	1998 FIFA World Cup qualification
7	24 February 1998	Pro Player Stadium, Miami Gardens, United States	Mexico	1–0	3–2	Friendly
8	24 February 1998	Pro Player Stadium, Miami Gardens, United States	Mexico	2–0	3–2	Friendly
9	1 June 1998	Philips Stadion, Eindhoven, Netherlands	Paraguay	3–1	5–1	Friendly
10	5 June 1998	Amsterdam Arena, Amsterdam, Netherlands	Nigeria	3–0	5–1	Friendly
11	5 June 1998	Amsterdam Arena, Amsterdam, Netherlands	Nigeria	4–1	5–1	Friendly
12	4 July 1998	Stade Vélodrome, Marseille, France	Argentina	1–0	2–1	1998 FIFA World Cup
13	7 July 1998	Stade Vélodrome, Marseille, France	Brazil	1–1	1–1	1998 FIFA World Cup
14	5 June 1999	Estádio Octávio Mangabeira, Nazaré, Brazil	Brazil	1–2	2–2	Friendly
15	4 September 1999	De Kuip, Rotterdam, Netherlands	Belgium	3–2	5–5	Friendly
16	4 September 1999	De Kuip, Rotterdam, Netherlands	Belgium	4–4	5–5	Friendly
17	4 September 1999	De Kuip, Rotterdam, Netherlands	Belgium	5–4	5–5	Friendly
18	23 February 2000	Amsterdam Arena, Amsterdam, Netherlands	Germany	1–0	2–1	Friendly
19	29 March 2000	King Baudouin Stadium, Brussels, Belgium	Belgium	1–2	2–2	Friendly
20	29 March 2000	King Baudouin Stadium, Brussels, Belgium	Belgium	2–2	2–2	Friendly
21	27 May 2000	Amsterdam Arena, Amsterdam, Netherlands	Romania	2–0	2–1	Friendly
22	4 June 2000	Stade Olympique de la Pontaise, Lausanne, Switzerland	Poland	2–1	3–1	Friendly
23	4 June 2000	Stade Olympique de la Pontaise, Lausanne, Switzerland	Poland	3–1	3–1	Friendly
24	16 June 2000	De Kuip, Rotterdam, Netherlands	Denmark	1–0	3–0	UEFA Euro 2000
25	21 June 2000	Amsterdam Arena, Amsterdam, Netherlands	France	1–1	3–2	UEFA Euro 2000
26	25 June 2000	De Kuip, Rotterdam, Netherlands	FR Yugoslavia	1–0	6–1	UEFA Euro 2000
27	25 June 2000	De Kuip, Rotterdam, Netherlands	FR Yugoslavia	2–0	6–1	UEFA Euro 2000
28	25 June 2000	De Kuip, Rotterdam, Netherlands	FR Yugoslavia	4–0	6–1	UEFA Euro 2000
29	7 October 2000	GSP Stadium, Nicosia, Cyprus	Cyprus	4–0	4–0	2002 FIFA World Cup qualification
30	24 March 2001	Mini Estadi, Barcelona, Spain	Andorra	1–0	5–0	2002 FIFA World Cup qualification
31	28 March 2001	Estádio das Antas, Porto, Portugal	Portugal	2–0	2–2	2002 FIFA World Cup qualification
32	25 April 2001	Philips Stadion, Eindhoven, Netherlands	Cyprus	3–0	4–0	2002 FIFA World Cup qualification
33	2 June 2001	Lilleküla Stadium, Tallinn, Estonia	Estonia	3–2	4–2	2002 FIFA World Cup qualification
34	13 February 2002	Amsterdam Arena, Amsterdam, Netherlands	England	1–0	1–1	Friendly
35	7 September 2002	Philips Stadion, Eindhoven, Netherlands	Belarus	2–0	3–0	UEFA Euro 2004 qualifying
36	20 November 2002	Arena AufSchalke, Gelsenkirchen, Germany	Germany	1–0	3–1	Friendly
37	30 April 2003	Philips Stadion, Eindhoven, Netherlands	Portugal	1–0	1–1	Friendly
38	7 June 2003	Dinamo Stadium, Minsk, Belarus	Belarus	2–0	2–0	UEFA Euro 2004 qualifying
39	6 September 2003	De Kuip, Rotterdam, Netherlands	Austria	2–1	3–1	UEFA Euro 2004 qualifying
40	11 October 2003	Philips Stadion, Eindhoven, Netherlands	Moldova	1–0	5–0	UEFA Euro 2004 qualifying

== Managerial statistics ==
As of 16 October 2025

Managerial record by team and tenure
Team	Nat.	From	To	Record					
Team	Nat.	From	To	G	W	D	L	Win %	Ref.
Jong Twente	(Netherlands)	1 July 2011	30 June 2013	46	25	8	13	54.35	
Curaçao	(Curaçao)	4 March 2015	7 June 2016	12	6	3	3	50.00	
Curaçao (interim)	(Curaçao)	14 May 2021	31 October 2021	6	1	2	3	16.67	
Adana Demirspor	(Turkey)	1 July 2023	4 December 2023	20	9	6	5	45.00	
Indonesia	(Indonesia)	8 January 2025	16 October 2025	8	3	1	4	37.50	
Career Total				91	43	20	28	47.25	

== Honours ==
=== Player ===
Ajax

- Eredivisie: 1994–95, 1995–96
- Dutch Supercup: 1994, 1995
- UEFA Champions League: 1994–95
- UEFA Super Cup: 1995
- Intercontinental Cup: 1995

Barcelona

- La Liga: 1998–99

PSV

- Eredivisie: 2006–07

Individual

- Dutch Football Talent of the Year: 1995
- Bravo Award: 1995
- UEFA Euro Golden Boot: 2000
- UEFA Euro Team of the Tournament: 2000
- FIFA 100

=== Managerial ===
Jong Twente

- Beloften Eredivisie: 2011–12

Netherlands (as assistant manager)

- FIFA World Cup third place: 2014
