= Flanker =

Flanker may refer to:

- Flanker (perfume), a newly created perfume sharing attributes of an existing one
- Flanker (rugby union), a position in rugby union (not found in rugby league)
- Sukhoi Su-27 and its derivatives, by NATO reporting name
  - Su-27 Flanker (video game), a 1996 computer game modeling the Sukhoi Su-27
- Wide receiver, a position in American football
- Eriksen flanker task, involving a flanker that can diagnose certain neurological disorders

== See also ==
- Flank (disambiguation)
