= 2019–20 AS Roma season =

Roma
2019–20 season
- President: James Pallotta
- Manager: Paulo Fonseca
- Stadium: Stadio Olimpico
- Serie A: 5th
- Coppa Italia: Quarter-finals
- UEFA Europa League: Round of 16
- Top goalscorer: League: Edin Džeko (16); All: Edin Džeko (19)
- Highest home attendance: 60,513 vs Juventus (12 January 2020, Serie A)
- Lowest home attendance: 21,348 vs İstanbul Başakşehir (19 September 2019, Europa League)
- Average home league attendance: 39,397
Home colours	Away colours	Third colours

The 2019–20 season was Associazione Sportiva Roma's 92nd in existence and 91st season in the top flight of Italian football. Having finished sixth the previous season, the club competed in Serie A, the Coppa Italia, and the UEFA Europa League.

Shakhtar Donetsk coach Paulo Fonseca was hired by the club on 11 June to replace interim manager Claudio Ranieri, hired following the sacking of Eusebio Di Francesco the previous season, on a permanent basis.

The season was the first since 2000-01 without Daniele de Rossi part of the first-team squad, who joined Boca Juniors, after spending 18 seasons with the club.

== Players ==
=== Squad information ===
Last updated on 1 August 2020
Appearances and goals include all competitions

No.	Name	Nat	Position(s)	Date of birth (age)	Signed from	Signed in	Contract ends	Apps.	Goals
Goalkeepers
13	Pau López	(Spain)	GK	13 December 1994 (aged 25)	(Spain) Real Betis	2019	2024	42	0
63	Daniel Fuzato	(Brazil)	GK	4 July 1997 (aged 23)	(Brazil) Palmeiras	2018	2022	0	0
83	Antonio Mirante	(Italy)	GK	8 July 1983 (aged 37)	(Italy) Bologna	2018	2021	20	0
Defenders
2	Davide Zappacosta	(Italy)	RB / RM	11 June 1992 (aged 28)	(England) Chelsea	2019	2020	9	0
5	Juan Jesus	(Brazil)	CB / LB	10 June 1991 (aged 29)	(Italy) Internazionale	2016	2020	91	1
6	Chris Smalling	(England)	CB	22 November 1989 (aged 30)	(England) Manchester United	2019	2020	37	3
11	Aleksandar Kolarov	(Serbia)	LB	10 November 1985 (aged 34)	(England) Manchester City	2017	2020	132	19
15	Mert Çetin	(Turkey)	CB	1 January 1997 (aged 23)	(Turkey) Gençlerbirliği	2019	2024	6	0
18	Davide Santon	(Italy)	LB / RB	2 January 1991 (aged 29)	(Italy) Internazionale	2018	2022	42	0
20	Federico Fazio	(Argentina)	CB	17 March 1987 (aged 33)	(England) Tottenham Hotspur	2016	2021	158	13
23	Gianluca Mancini	(Italy)	CB	17 April 1996 (aged 24)	(Italy) Atalanta	2019	2020	41	1
33	Bruno Peres	(Brazil)	RB / LB	1 March 1990 (aged 30)	(Italy) Torino	2017	2021	88	4
37	Leonardo Spinazzola	(Italy)	LB / LWB	25 March 1993 (aged 27)	(Italy) Juventus	2019	2023	32	2
41	Roger Ibañez	(Brazil)	CB / LB	23 November 1998 (aged 21)	(Italy) Atalanta	2020	2021	10	0
Midfielders
4	Bryan Cristante	(Italy)	DM / CM	3 March 1995 (aged 25)	(Italy) Atalanta	2018	2023	77	5
7	Lorenzo Pellegrini (vc)	(Italy)	AM / CM	19 June 1996 (aged 24)	(Italy) Sassuolo	2017	2022	104	9
14	Gonzalo Villar	(Spain)	CM	23 March 1998 (aged 22)	(Spain) Elche	2020	2024	11	0
21	Jordan Veretout	(France)	CM / AM	1 March 1993 (aged 27)	(Italy) Fiorentina	2019	2020	43	7
22	Nicolò Zaniolo	(Italy)	AM	2 July 1999 (aged 21)	(Italy) Internazionale	2018	2024	69	14
27	Javier Pastore	(Argentina)	AM / LW	20 June 1989 (aged 31)	(France) Paris Saint-Germain	2018	2023	32	4
42	Amadou Diawara	(Guinea)	DM	17 July 1997 (aged 23)	(Italy) Napoli	2019	2024	30	1
53	Alessio Riccardi	(Italy)	CM	3 April 2001 (aged 19)	(Italy) Youth Sector	2019	2023	1	0
77	Henrikh Mkhitaryan	(Armenia)	AM / LW	21 January 1989 (aged 31)	(England) Arsenal	2019	2020	27	9
Forwards
8	Diego Perotti	(Argentina)	LW / RW	26 July 1988 (aged 32)	(Italy) Genoa	2016	2021	138	32
9	Edin Džeko (c)	(Bosnia and Herzegovina)	CF	17 March 1986 (aged 34)	(England) Manchester City	2015	2022	222	103
17	Cengiz Ünder	(Turkey)	RW	14 July 1997 (aged 23)	(Turkey) İstanbul Başakşehir	2017	2023	88	17
19	Nikola Kalinić	(Croatia)	CF	5 January 1988 (aged 32)	(Spain) Atlético Madrid	2019	2020	19	5
31	Carles Pérez	(Spain)	RW / LW	16 February 1998 (aged 22)	(Spain) Barcelona	2020	2020	17	2
99	Justin Kluivert	(Netherlands)	LW / RW	5 May 1999 (aged 21)	(Netherlands) Ajax	2018	2023	66	9
Players transferred during the season
1	Robin Olsen	(Sweden)	GK	8 January 1990 (aged 30)	(Denmark) Copenhagen	2018	2023	35	0
14	Patrik Schick	(Czech Republic)	CF	24 January 1996 (aged 24)	(Italy) Sampdoria	2017	2018	58	8
24	Alessandro Florenzi	(Italy)	RB	11 March 1991 (aged 29)	(Italy) Youth Sector	2011	2023	280	28
28	William Bianda	(France)	CB	30 April 2000 (aged 20)	(France) Lens	2018	2023	0	0
48	Mirko Antonucci	(Italy)	RW / LW	11 March 1999 (aged 21)	(Italy) Youth Sector	2018	2022	7	0

== Transfers ==
=== In ===
Date	Pos.	Player	Age	From	Fee	Notes	Ref
1 July 2019	DF	(Italy) Leonardo Spinazzola	26	(Italy) Juventus	€29.5M		
1 July 2019	MF	(Guinea) Amadou Diawara	21	(Italy) Napoli	€21M		
9 July 2019	GK	(Spain) Pau López	24	(Spain) Real Betis	€23.5M	Plus 50% of Antonio Sanabria's resale fee	
16 August 2019	DF	(Turkey) Mert Çetin	22	(Turkey) Gençlerbirliği	€3M	Gençlerbirliği retain a right to 10% of any future transfer fee if the player will be sold for a sum exceeding €5m	
29 January 2020	MF	(Spain) Gonzalo Villar	21	(Spain) Elche	€4M		

==== Loans in ====
Date	Pos.	Player	Age	From	Fee	Notes	Ref
17 July 2019	DF	(Italy) Gianluca Mancini	23	(Italy) Atalanta	€2M	On loan until 2020 with obligation to buy for €13M + €8M variables plus 10% sell-on fee	
20 July 2019	MF	(France) Jordan Veretout	26	(Italy) Fiorentina	€1M	On loan until 2020 with obligation to buy for €16M + €2M variables	
21 August 2019	DF	(Italy) Davide Zappacosta	27	(England) Chelsea	Free	On loan until January 2020 with an option to extend the loan until the end of the 2019–20 season	
30 August 2019	DF	(England) Chris Smalling	29	(England) Manchester United	€3M		
2 September 2019	FW	(Croatia) Nikola Kalinić	31	(Spain) Atlético Madrid	Free	Loan with an option to buy for €11M	
2 September 2019	MF	(Armenia) Henrikh Mkhitaryan	30	(England) Arsenal	€3M		
27 January 2020	DF	(Brazil) Roger Ibañez	21	(Italy) Atalanta	Free	On loan until June 2021 with obligation to buy for €8M + €2M variables	
29 January 2020	FW	(Spain) Carles Pérez	21	(Spain) Barcelona	€1M	On loan until June 2020 with obligation to buy for €11M + €4.5M bonus fees	

=== Out ===
Date	Pos.	Player	Age	Moving to	Fee	Notes	Ref
21 June 2019	FW	(Argentina) Ezequiel Ponce	22	(Russia) Spartak Moscow	€3M	€3M + €3M variables	
26 June 2019	GK	(Italy) Andrea Romagnoli	20	(Russia) Spartak Moscow	€2.5M		
30 June 2019	DF	(Greece) Kostas Manolas	28	(Italy) Napoli	€36M		
30 June 2019	DF	(Italy) Luca Pellegrini	20	(Italy) Juventus	€22M		
1 July 2019	MF	(Italy) Daniele De Rossi	35	(Argentina) Boca Juniors	Free	End of contract	
8 July 2019	FW	(Italy) Stephan El Shaarawy	26	(China) Shanghai Shenhua	€16M		
10 July 2019	FW	(Italy) Edoardo Soleri	21	(Italy) Padova	Undisclosed		
11 July 2019	DF	(Spain) Iván Marcano	32	(Portugal) Porto	€3M		
12 July 2019	MF	(Brazil) Gerson	22	(Brazil) Flamengo	€11.8M		
17 July 2019	FW	(Italy) Daniele Verde	23	(Greece) AEK Athens	€1M	Plus 30% sell-on fee	
1 August 2019	DF	(Italy) Elio Capradossi	23	(Italy) Spezia	Undisclosed		

==== Loans out ====
Date	Pos.	Player	Age	Moving to	Fee	Notes	Ref
2 July 2019	FW	(Nigeria) Umar Sadiq	22	(Serbia) Partizan	Loan		
12 July 2019	FW	(Slovenia) Žan Celar	20	(Italy) Cittadella	Loan		
13 July 2019	DF	(Argentina) Matías Nani	21	(Argentina) Central Córdoba	Loan		
7 August 2019	DF	(Netherlands) Rick Karsdorp	24	(Netherlands) Feyenoord	Loan		
16 August 2019	MF	(France) Steven Nzonzi	30	(Turkey) Galatasaray	€0.5M	Two-year loan with an option to buy for €16M in 2020, €13M in 2021	
27 August 2019	MF	(Croatia) Ante Ćorić	22	(Spain) Almería	€0.4M	On loan until June 2020 with an option to buy for €6M	
30 August 2019	FW	(France) Grégoire Defrel	28	(Italy) Sassuolo	€3M	Loan with an obligation to buy for €9M	
30 August 2019	GK	(Sweden) Robin Olsen	29	(Italy) Cagliari	Loan		
2 September 2019	MF	(France) Maxime Gonalons	30	(Spain) Granada	Loan	Loan with conditional obligation to buy	
2 September 2019	FW	(Czech Republic) Patrik Schick	23	(Germany) RB Leipzig	Loan		
30 January 2020	DF	(Italy) Alessandro Florenzi	28	(Spain) Valencia	Loan		
31 January 2020	FW	(Italy) Mirko Antonucci	20	(Portugal) Vitória de Setúbal	Loan		
31 January 2020	MF	(France) Steven Nzonzi	31	(France) Rennes	Loan	Six-month loan with an option to extend for another season	

== Pre-season and friendlies ==
27 July 2019 Friendly	Roma (Italy)	3–1	(Italy) Ternana	Rome, Italy
18:00 CEST (UTC+2)	Ünder 51', 63'; Defrel 90+3'	Report	Defendi 14'	Stadium: Stadio Olimpico

31 July 2019 Friendly	Perugia (Italy)	1–3	(Italy) Roma	Perugia, Italy
20:30 CEST (UTC+2)	Iemmello 35'	Report	Džeko 8'; Mancini 21', 90'	Stadium: Stadio Renato Curi

3 August 2019 Friendly	Lille (France)	2–3	(Italy) Roma	Villeneuve-d'Ascq, France
16:00 CEST (UTC+2)	Weah 19'; Luiz Araújo 73'	Report	Kolarov (yellow card) 17'; Ünder 51'; Zaniolo 62'; Cristante 90+1'	Stadium: Stade Pierre-Mauroy; Attendance: 23,042; Referee: Jérôme Brisard (France)

7 August 2019 Friendly	Roma (Italy)	2–2	(Spain) Athletic Bilbao	Perugia, Italy
20:00 CEST (UTC+2)	Zaniolo (yellow card) 50'; Kolarov 59'; Antonucci (yellow card) 76'; Lo. Pellegrini 90+2' (pen.)	Report	R. García (yellow card) 25', (goal) 78' (pen.); Muniain 27'; López (yellow card) 43'; Berchiche (red card) 61'	Stadium: Stadio Renato Curi; Referee: Fabio Maresca (Italy)

11 August 2019 Mabel Green Cup	Roma (Italy)	2–2 (5–4 p)	(Spain) Real Madrid	Rome, Italy
20:00 CEST (UTC+2)	Perotti 34'; Džeko 40'	Report	Marcelo 16'; Casemiro 39'; Militão (yellow card) 63'	Stadium: Stadio Olimpico; Referee: Michael Fabbri (Italy)
	Penalties
	Kolarov (penalty scored); Ünder (penalty scored); Antonucci (penalty scored); Cristante (penalty scored); Spinazzola (penalty scored)		(penalty scored) Kroos; (penalty scored) Isco; (penalty scored) Bale; (penalty scored) Modrić; (penalty missed) Marcelo

17 August 2019 Friendly	Arezzo (Italy)	1–3	(Italy) Roma	Arezzo, Italy
19:30 CEST (UTC+2)	Cheddira (yellow card) 12'; Belloni 53' (pen.)	Report	Perotti 49' (pen.); Kolarov (yellow card) 54'; Džeko 65'; Kluivert 88'	Stadium: Stadio Città di Arezzo

== Competitions ==
=== Serie A ===
==== League table ====
Pos	Team	Pld	W	D	L	GF	GA	GD	Pts	Qualification or relegation
3	Atalanta	38	23	9	6	98	48	+50	78 (Note: Atalanta finished ahead of Lazio on head-to-head points: Lazio 3–3 Atalanta, Atalanta 3–2 Lazio.)	Qualification for the Champions League group stage
4	Lazio	38	24	6	8	79	42	+37	78	Qualification for the Champions League group stage
5	Roma	38	21	7	10	77	51	+26	70	Qualification for the Europa League group stage
6	Milan	38	19	9	10	63	46	+17	66	Qualification for the Europa League second qualifying round
7	Napoli	38	18	8	12	61	50	+11	62	Qualification for the Europa League group stage (Note: Napoli qualified for the Europa League group stage by winning the 2019–20 Coppa Italia.)

Source: Serie A, Soccerway
Rules for classification: 1) Points; 2) Head-to-head points; 3) Head-to-head goal difference; 4) Goal difference; 5) Goals scored; 6) Draw. (Note: Head-to-head record is used only after all the matches between the teams in question have been played)

==== Results summary ====
Overall								Home						Away					
Pld	W	D	L	GF	GA	GD	Pts	W	D	L	GF	GA	GD	W	D	L	GF	GA	GD
38	21	7	10	77	51	+26	70	10	4	5	36	27	+9	11	3	5	41	24	+17

Source: Competitive matches

==== Results by round ====
Round	1	2	3	4	5	6	7	8	9	10	11	12	13	14	15	16	17	18	19	20	21	22	23	24	25	26	27	28	29	30	31	32	33	34	35	36	37	38
Ground	H	A	H	A	H	A	H	A	H	A	H	A	H	A	A	H	A	H	H	A	H	A	H	A	H	A	H	A	H	A	H	A	H	H	A	H	A	A
Result	D	D	W	W	L	W	D	D	W	W	W	L	W	W	D	W	W	L	L	W	D	L	L	L	W	W	W	L	L	L	W	W	W	D	W	W	W	W
Position	10	15	8	4	7	5	5	6	5	4	3	6	5	5	5	4	4	4	5	4	4	5	5	5	5	5	5	5	5	5	5	5	5	5	5	5	5	5

Source: Competitive matches
A = Away; H = Home; W = Win; D = Draw; L = Loss

==== Matches ====
25 August 2019 1	Roma	3–3	Genoa	Rome
20:45 CEST (UTC+02:00)	Ünder 6'; Džeko 30'; Florenzi (yellow card) 38'; Juan Jesus (yellow card) 42'; Kolarov 49'; Pellegrini (yellow card) 74'	Report	Pinamonti 16'; Criscito 43' (pen.); Romero (yellow card) 56'; Kouamé 70'	Stadium: Stadio Olimpico; Attendance: 38,779; Referee: Gianpaolo Calvarese

1 September 2019 2	Lazio	1–1	Roma	Rome
18:00 CEST (UTC+02:00)	Luiz Felipe (yellow card) 25'; Immobile (yellow card) 55'; Luis Alberto 59'; Radu (yellow card) 63'; Acerbi (yellow card) 76'	Report	Kolarov 17' (pen.); Zaniolo (yellow card) 31'; Florenzi (yellow card) 70'; Santon (yellow card) 84'	Stadium: Stadio Olimpico; Attendance: 50,000; Referee: Marco Guida

15 September 2019 3	Roma	4–2	Sassuolo	Rome
18:00 CEST (UTC+02:00)	Cristante 12'; Džeko 19'; Mkhitaryan 22'; Pellegrini (yellow card) 28'; Kluivert 33'	Report	Obiang (yellow card) 33'; Berardi 53', 72'; Toljan (yellow card) 82'	Stadium: Stadio Olimpico; Attendance: 34,407; Referee: Daniele Chiffi

22 September 2019 4	Bologna	1–2	Roma	Bologna
15:00 CEST (UTC+02:00)	Poli (yellow card) 15'; Dijks (yellow card) 41'; Sansone 54' (pen.); Tomiyasu (yellow card) 56'	Report	Florenzi (yellow card) 13'; Kolarov 49'; Zaniolo (yellow card) 59'; Džeko (yellow card) 62', (goal) 90+4'; Veretout (yellow card) 64'; Mancini (yellow card) 71' (yellow-red card) 85'	Stadium: Stadio Renato Dall'Ara; Attendance: 25,513; Referee: Luca Pairetto

25 September 2019 5	Roma	0–2	Atalanta	Rome
19:00 CEST (UTC+02:00)	Zaniolo (yellow card) 40'; Juan Jesus (yellow card) 89'	Report	Kjær (yellow card) 25'; Zapata 71'; De Roon 90'	Stadium: Stadio Olimpico; Attendance: 31,832; Referee: Massimiliano Irrati

29 September 2019 6	Lecce	0–1	Roma	Lecce
15:00 CEST (UTC+02:00)	Lucioni (yellow card) 79'; Majer (yellow card) 84'	Report	Pellegrini (yellow card) 19'; Mkhitaryan (yellow card) 25'; Smalling (yellow card) 49'; Džeko 56'; Cristante (yellow card) 90+6'	Stadium: Stadio Via del Mare; Attendance: 26,044; Referee: Rosario Abisso

6 October 2019 7	Roma	1–1	Cagliari	Rome
15:00 CEST (UTC+02:00)	Ceppitelli 31' (o.g.); Kolarov (yellow card) 44'	Report	Ceppitelli (yellow card) 11'; Cigarini (yellow card) 16'; João Pedro 26' (pen.); Simeone (yellow card) 33'; Pellegrini (yellow card) 80'	Stadium: Stadio Olimpico; Attendance: 34,385; Referee: Davide Massa

20 October 2019 8	Sampdoria	0–0	Roma	Genoa
15:00 CEST (UTC+02:00)	Vieira (yellow card) 5'; Bertolacci (yellow card) 33'; Bereszyński (yellow card) 66'	Report	Kluivert (yellow card) 31' (yellow-red card) 86'; Mancini (yellow card) 43'; Perotti (yellow card) 90+1'	Stadium: Stadio Luigi Ferraris; Attendance: 17,031; Referee: Fabio Maresca

27 October 2019 9	Roma	2–1	Milan	Rome
18:00 CET (UTC+01:00)	Džeko 38'; Mancini (yellow card) 41'; Zaniolo 59'; Antonucci (yellow card) 78'; Çetin (yellow card) 83'; Kolarov (yellow card) 90+1'	Report	Musacchio (yellow card) 49'; Hernandez 55'; Biglia (yellow card) 64'; Çalhanoğlu (yellow card) 74'; Romagnoli (yellow card) 90+5'; A. Donnarumma (yellow card) 90+6'	Stadium: Stadio Olimpico; Attendance: 44,333; Referee: Daniele Orsato
Note: Antonio Donnarumma was cautioned for dissent while a substitute.

30 October 2019 10	Udinese	0–4	Roma	Udine
21:00 CET (UTC+01:00)	Okaka (yellow card) 35'; Jajalo (yellow card) 47'; Barák (yellow card) 50'; De Paul (yellow card) 68'	Report	Mancini (yellow card) 3'; Zaniolo 14'; Fazio (red card) 32'; Džeko (yellow card) 33'; Smalling 51'; Kluivert 54'; Kolarov 66' (pen.)	Stadium: Dacia Arena; Attendance: 23,854; Referee: Massimiliano Irrati

2 November 2019 11	Roma	2–1	Napoli	Rome
15:00 CET (UTC+01:00)	Zaniolo 19'; Veretout 55' (pen.); Kluivert (yellow card) 76'; Spinazzola (yellow card) 86'; Ünder (yellow card) 90+3'; Çetin (yellow card) 90+3' (yellow-red card) 90+6'	Report	Milik 72', (yellow card) 88'; Insigne (yellow card) 77'; Mário Rui (yellow card) 78'	Stadium: Stadio Olimpico; Attendance: 34,502; Referee: Gianluca Rocchi

10 November 2019 12	Parma	2–0	Roma	Parma
18:00 CET (UTC+01:00)	Scozzarella (yellow card) 24'; Sprocati 68'; Barillà (yellow card) 75'; Hernani (yellow card) 76'; Cornelius 90+3'	Report	Zaniolo (yellow card) 11'; Kluivert (yellow card) 78'	Stadium: Stadio Ennio Tardini; Attendance: 18,532; Referee: Michael Fabbri

24 November 2019 13	Roma	3–0	Brescia	Rome
15:00 CET (UTC+01:00)	Smalling 49'; Mancini 57'; Džeko 66'; Zaniolo (yellow card) 80'	Report	Rômulo (yellow card) 70'	Stadium: Stadio Olimpico; Attendance: 33,695; Referee: Marco Di Bello

1 December 2019 14	Hellas Verona	1–3	Roma	Verona
20:45 CET (UTC+01:00)	Faraoni 21'; Günter (yellow card) 44'; Bocchetti (yellow card) 64'; Amrabat (yellow card) 87'	Report	Kluivert 17'; Pellegrini (yellow card) 28'; Perotti 45' (pen.); Mancini (yellow card) 61'; Diawara (yellow card) 70'; Mkhitaryan 90+2'	Stadium: Stadio Marc'Antonio Bentegodi; Attendance: 17,405; Referee: Marco Guida

6 December 2019 15	Internazionale	0–0	Roma	Milan
20:45 CET (UTC+01:00)	Godín (yellow card) 61'; Lazaro (yellow card) 62'; Brozović (yellow card) 80'	Report	Mancini (yellow card) 77'	Stadium: San Siro; Attendance: 67,008; Referee: Gianpaolo Calvarese

15 December 2019 16	Roma	3–1	SPAL	Rome
18:00 CET (UTC+01:00)	Tomović 53' (o.g.); Çetin (yellow card) 54'; Perotti 66' (pen.); Mkhitaryan 83'	Report	Petagna 44' (pen.); Felipe (yellow card) 50'; Vicari (yellow card) 66'; Janković (yellow card) 90+2'	Stadium: Stadio Olimpico; Attendance: 34,761; Referee: Antonio Giua

20 December 2019 17	Fiorentina	1–4	Roma	Florence
20:45 CET (UTC+01:00)	Pezzella (yellow card) 21'; Badelj 34'; Cáceres (yellow card) 45+1'; Castrovilli (yellow card) 64'; Vlahović (yellow card) 89'	Report	Džeko 19'; Kolarov 21', (yellow card) 45+2'; Zaniolo (yellow card) 38', (goal) 88'; Diawara (yellow card) 57'; Pellegrini 73'	Stadium: Stadio Artemio Franchi; Attendance: 33,055; Referee: Daniele Orsato

5 January 2020 18	Roma	0–2	Torino	Rome
20:45 CET (UTC+01:00)	Diawara (yellow card) 28'; Veretout (yellow card) 45'; Kolarov (yellow card) 55'; Mancini (yellow card) 64'; Florenzi (yellow card) 76'	Report	Izzo (yellow card) 15'; Verdi (yellow card) 20'; Belotti 45+2', 86' (pen.)	Stadium: Stadio Olimpico; Attendance: 38,954; Referee: Marco Di Bello

12 January 2020 19	Roma	1–2	Juventus	Rome
20:45 CET (UTC+01:00)	Veretout (yellow card) 9'; Kolarov (yellow card) 15'; Mancini (yellow card) 26'; Perotti 68' (pen.); Cristante (yellow card) 82'; Kalinić (yellow card) 83'; Florenzi (yellow card) 90+4'	Report	Demiral 3'; Ronaldo 10' (pen.); Pjanić (yellow card) 13'; De Ligt (yellow card) 32'; Cuadrado (yellow card) 45+1'	Stadium: Stadio Olimpico; Attendance: 60,513; Referee: Marco Guida

19 January 2020 20	Genoa	1–3	Roma	Genoa
18:00 CET (UTC+01:00)	Romero (yellow card) 38'; Pandev 45'; Cassata (yellow card) 61'	Report	Ünder 6'; Veretout (yellow card) 26'; Biraschi 44' (o.g.); Džeko (yellow card) 73', (goal) 74'; López (yellow card) 81'	Stadium: Stadio Luigi Ferraris; Attendance: 20,951; Referee: Fabio Maresca

26 January 2020 21	Roma	1–1	Lazio	Rome
18:00 CET (UTC+01:00)	Džeko 26', (yellow card) 53'; Kolarov (yellow card) 87'	Report	Acerbi 34'; Luiz Felipe (yellow card) 40'; Milinković-Savić (yellow card) 64'; Lulić (yellow card) 82'; Immobile (yellow card) 90+3'	Stadium: Stadio Olimpico; Attendance: 59,902; Referee: Gianpaolo Calvarese

1 February 2020 22	Sassuolo	4–2	Roma	Reggio Emilia
20:45 CET (UTC+01:00)	Caputo 7', 16'; Đuričić 26'; Obiang (yellow card) 34'; Boga 74'	Report	Cristante (yellow card) 24'; Santon (yellow card) 29'; Pellegrini (yellow card) 44' (yellow-red card) 69'; Džeko 55'; Kluivert (yellow card) 62'; Spinazzola (yellow card) 65'; Veretout 73' (pen.); Mancini (yellow card) 84'	Stadium: Mapei Stadium – Città del Tricolore; Attendance: 13,411; Referee: Luca Pairetto

7 February 2020 23	Roma	2–3	Bologna	Rome
20:45 CET (UTC+01:00)	Denswil 22' (o.g.); Santon (yellow card) 59'; Mkhitaryan 72'; Cristante (red card) 80'; Peres (yellow card) 85'	Report	Orsolini 16'; Barrow 26', 51'; Svanberg (yellow card) 38'; Schouten (yellow card) 55'; Bani (yellow card) 59'; Skorupski (yellow card) 88'	Stadium: Stadio Olimpico; Attendance: 31,808; Referee: Marco Guida

15 February 2020 24	Atalanta	2–1	Roma	Bergamo
20:45 CET (UTC+01:00)	Palomino 50'; Gosens (yellow card) 55'; Pašalić 59'	Report	Mancini (yellow card) 11'; Mkhitaryan (yellow card) 27'; Džeko 45'; Fazio (yellow card) 88'; Pérez (yellow card) 90+3'	Stadium: Stadio Atleti Azzurri d'Italia; Attendance: 19,830; Referee: Daniele Orsato

23 February 2020 25	Roma	4–0	Lecce	Rome
18:00 CET (UTC+01:00)	Ünder 13'; Mkhitaryan 37'; Mancini (yellow card) 49'; Džeko 69'; Kolarov 80'	Report		Stadium: Stadio Olimpico; Attendance: 34,293; Referee: Piero Giacomelli

1 March 2020 26	Cagliari	3–4	Roma	Cagliari
18:00 CET (UTC+01:00)	João Pedro 28', 89', (yellow card) 35'; Simeone (yellow card) 70'; Pereiro 75'; Pellegrini (yellow card) 80'; Ragatzu (yellow card) 90+6'	Report	Kalinić 29', 42'; Ünder (yellow card) 34'; Villar (yellow card) 55'; Kluivert 64', (yellow card) 78'; Mkhitaryan 81'; López (yellow card) 90+2'; Santon (yellow card) 90+6'	Stadium: Sardegna Arena; Attendance: 14,848; Referee: Marco Di Bello

24 June 2020 27	Roma	2–1	Sampdoria	Rome
21:45 CEST (UTC+02:00)	Džeko 64', 85'; Mkhitaryan (yellow card) 81'	Report	Gabbiadini 11'; Jankto (yellow card) 39'; Bereszyński (yellow card) 59'	Stadium: Stadio Olimpico; Attendance: 0 Referee: Gianpaolo Calvarese
Note: Match was postponed to 15 March, then to 24 June, from its original date of 8 March due to schedule shuffling to allow for previous postponements to be played due to concerns over the COVID-19 pandemic. All subsequent matches were also shuffled to allow for this accommodation. On 9 March, all sports events in Italy were suspended until 3 April. This was the first match played since the COVID-19 pandemic lockdown in Italy.

28 June 2020 28	Milan	2–0	Roma	Milan
17:15 CEST (UTC+02:00)	Castillejo (yellow card) 41'; Rebić (yellow card) 62', (goal) 76'; Çalhanoğlu 89' (pen.)	Report	Pellegrini (yellow card) 23'; Veretout (yellow card) 90+1'	Stadium: San Siro; Attendance: 0 Referee: Piero Giacomelli

2 July 2020 29	Roma	0–2	Udinese	Rome
21:45 CEST (UTC+02:00)	Perotti (red card) 29'; Mkhitaryan (yellow card) 45+2'; Villar (yellow card) 68'; Ibañez (yellow card) 89'	Report	Zeegelaar (yellow card) 11'; Lasagna 12'; Okaka (yellow card) 45+2'; Nestorovski 78'	Stadium: Stadio Olimpico; Attendance: 0 Referee: Marco Guida

5 July 2020 30	Napoli	2–1	Roma	Naples
21:45 CEST (UTC+02:00)	Demme (yellow card) 7'; Koulibaly (yellow card) 49'; Callejón 55'; Insigne 82'	Report	Pellegrini (yellow card) 10'; Mkhitaryan 60'; Mancini (yellow card) 65'; Veretout (yellow card) 75'; Cristante (yellow card) 80'	Stadium: Stadio San Paolo; Attendance: 0 Referee: Gianluca Rocchi

8 July 2020 31	Roma	2–1	Parma	Rome
21:45 CEST (UTC+02:00)	Cristante (yellow card) 9'; Mkhitaryan 43', (yellow card) 78'; Peres (yellow card) 49'; Veretout 57'; Diawara (yellow card) 71'; Ibañez (yellow card) 90+4'	Report	Kucka 9' (pen.); Kurtić (yellow card) 85'	Stadium: Stadio Olimpico; Attendance: 0 Referee: Michael Fabbri

11 July 2020 32	Brescia	0–3	Roma	Brescia
19:30 CEST (UTC+02:00)	Tonali (yellow card) 9'	Report	Fazio 48'; Peres (yellow card) 61'; Kalinić 62'; Zaniolo 74'; Perotti (yellow card) 86'	Stadium: Stadio Mario Rigamonti; Attendance: 0 Referee: Gianpaolo Calvarese

15 July 2020 33	Roma	2–1	Hellas Verona	Rome
21:45 CEST (UTC+02:00)	Veretout 10' (pen.); Džeko 45+4'; Mancini (yellow card) 63'; Zaniolo (yellow card) 71'; Cristante (yellow card) 78'; Villar (yellow card) 90+6'	Report	Veloso (yellow card) 9'; Pessina 47', (yellow card) 67'; Eysseric (yellow card) 90+5'	Stadium: Stadio Olimpico; Attendance: 0 Referee: Fabio Maresca

19 July 2020 34	Roma	2–2	Internazionale	Rome
21:45 CEST (UTC+02:00)	Spinazzola 45+1'; Mkhitaryan 57'; López (yellow card) 72'	Report	De Vrij 15'; Barella (yellow card) 23'; Lukaku 88' (pen.)	Stadium: Stadio Olimpico; Attendance: 0 Referee: Marco Di Bello

22 July 2020 35	SPAL	1–6	Roma	Ferrara
21:45 CEST (UTC+02:00)	Cerri 24'; Espeto (yellow card) 77'; Bonifazi (red card) 85'	Report	Kalinić 10'; Pérez 38'; Kolarov 47'; Peres 52', 75'; Zaniolo 90'	Stadium: Stadio Paolo Mazza; Attendance: 0 Referee: Gianluca Manganiello

26 July 2020 36	Roma	2–1	Fiorentina	Rome
19:30 CEST (UTC+02:00)	Veretout 45' (pen.), 87' (pen.); Mancini (yellow card) 90+6'	Report	Pezzella (yellow card) 35'; Milenković 54', (yellow card) 90+3'; Cáceres (yellow card) 72'; Ghezzal (yellow card) 86'	Stadium: Stadio Olimpico; Attendance: 0 Referee: Daniele Chiffi

29 July 2020 37	Torino	2–3	Roma	Turin
21:45 CEST (UTC+02:00)	Berenguer 14'; Lyanco (yellow card) 23'; Meïté (yellow card) 55'; Singo 65'	Report	Džeko 16'; Smalling 23'; Pérez (yellow card) 35'; Mancini (yellow card) 38'; Diawara 61' (pen.); Zaniolo (yellow card) 81'	Stadium: Stadio Olimpico Grande Torino; Attendance: 0 Referee: Marco Piccinini

1 August 2020 38	Juventus	1–3	Roma	Turin
20:45 CEST (UTC+02:00)	Higuaín 5'; Rugani (yellow card) 21'	Report	Kalinić 23'; Smalling (yellow card) 40'; Perotti 44' (pen.), 52', (yellow card) 45+1'; Cristante (yellow card) 54'; Fazio (yellow card) 90+3'	Stadium: Allianz Stadium; Attendance: 0 Referee: Gianluca Rocchi

=== Coppa Italia ===
16 January 2020 Round of 16	Parma	0–2	Roma	Parma
21:15 CET (UTC+01:00)	Laurini (yellow card) 37'; Dermaku (yellow card) 56'	Report	Pellegrini 49', 76' (pen.), (yellow card) 57'; Ünder (yellow card) 54'	Stadium: Stadio Ennio Tardini; Attendance: 3,604; Referee: Luca Pairetto

22 January 2020 Quarter-finals	Juventus	3–1	Roma	Turin
20:45 CET (UTC+01:00)	Ronaldo 26'; Bentancur 38'; Bonucci 45+2'; Higuaín (yellow card) 65'; Matuidi (yellow card) 80'	Report	Cristante (yellow card) 31'; Buffon 50' (o.g.)	Stadium: Allianz Stadium; Attendance: 40,791; Referee: Gianluca Rocchi

=== UEFA Europa League ===
==== Group stage ====
Pos	Team	Pld	W	D	L	GF	GA	GD	Pts	Qualification	IBS	ROM	MGB	WLB
1	(Turkey) İstanbul Başakşehir	6	3	1	2	7	9	−2	10	Advance to knockout phase	—	0–3	1–1	1–0
2	(Italy) Roma	6	2	3	1	12	6	+6	9	Advance to knockout phase	4–0	—	1–1	2–2
3	(Germany) Borussia Mönchengladbach	6	2	2	2	6	9	−3	8		1–2	2–1	—	0–4
4	(Austria) Wolfsberger AC	6	1	2	3	7	8	−1	5		0–3	1–1	0–1	—

Source: UEFA
Rules for classification: Group stage tiebreakers

19 September 2019 1	Roma (Italy)	4–0	(Turkey) İstanbul Başakşehir	Rome, Italy
21:00 CEST (UTC+02:00)	Júnior Caiçara 42' (o.g.); Džeko 58'; Juan Jesus (yellow card) 66'; Zaniolo 71'; Veretout (yellow card) 73'; Kluivert 90+3'	Report		Stadium: Stadio Olimpico; Attendance: 21,348; Referee: Xavier Estrada Fernández (Spain)

3 October 2019 2	Wolfsberger AC (Austria)	1–1	(Italy) Roma	Graz, Austria
18:55 CEST (UTC+02:00)	Sollbauer (yellow card) 19'; Liendl 51'	Report	Spinazzola 27'; Cristante (yellow card) 32'; Zaniolo (yellow card) 54'; Diawara (yellow card) 67'; Kluivert (yellow card) 84'	Stadium: Liebenauer Stadium; Attendance: 11,169; Referee: Tiago Martins (Portugal)

24 October 2019 3	Roma (Italy)	1–1	(Germany) Borussia Mönchengladbach	Rome, Italy
18:55 CEST (UTC+02:00)	Zaniolo 32'; Veretout (yellow card) 50'; Kluivert (yellow card) 72'; Antonucci (yellow card) 90+2'; Smalling (yellow card) 90+3'	Report	Bensebaini (yellow card) 65'; Lainer (yellow card) 81'; Stindl 90+5' (pen.)	Stadium: Stadio Olimpico; Attendance: 29,037; Referee: Willie Collum (Scotland)

7 November 2019 4	Borussia Mönchengladbach (Germany)	2–1	(Italy) Roma	Mönchengladbach, Germany
21:00 CET (UTC+01:00)	Fazio 35' (o.g.); Bénes (yellow card) 45'; Bensebaini (yellow card) 88'; Thuram 90+5', (yellow card) 90+5'; Kramer (yellow card) 90+6'; Neuhaus (yellow card) 90+6'	Report	Mancini (yellow card) 41'; Fazio 64'; Santon (yellow card) 87'; Diawara (yellow card) 90+3'	Stadium: Borussia-Park; Attendance: 44,570; Referee: Jesús Gil Manzano (Spain)

28 November 2019 5	İstanbul Başakşehir (Turkey)	0–3	(Italy) Roma	Istanbul, Turkey
18:55 CET (UTC+01:00)	Topal (yellow card) 29'	Report	Veretout 30' (pen.); Kolarov (yellow card) 35'; Kluivert 41'; Džeko 45+1'	Stadium: Başakşehir Fatih Terim Stadium; Attendance: 12,879; Referee: Ovidiu Hațegan (Romania)

12 December 2019 6	Roma (Italy)	2–2	(Austria) Wolfsberger AC	Rome, Italy
21:00 CET (UTC+01:00)	Perotti 7' (pen.); Džeko 19'; Diawara (yellow card) 32'	Report	Florenzi 10' (o.g.); Rnić (yellow card) 56'; Weissman 64'; Wernitznig (yellow card) 75'	Stadium: Stadio Olimpico; Attendance: 21,672; Referee: Craig Pawson (England)

==== Knockout phase ====
===== Round of 32 =====
20 February 2020 First leg	Roma (Italy)	1–0	(Belgium) Gent	Rome, Italy
21:00 CET (UTC+01:00)	Pérez 13'; Smalling (yellow card) 65'	Report	Bezus (yellow card) 35'	Stadium: Stadio Olimpico; Attendance: 28,248; Referee: Georgi Kabakov (Bulgaria)

27 February 2020 Second leg	Gent (Belgium)	1–1 (1–2 agg.)	(Italy) Roma	Ghent, Belgium
18:55 CET (UTC+01:00)	Jonathan David 25'; Bezus (yellow card) 28'; Depoitre (yellow card) 50'; Kums (yellow card) 83'; Mohammadi (yellow card) 90+3'; Odjidja-Ofoe (yellow card) 90+5'	Report	Kluivert 29'; Veretout (yellow card) 42'; Spinazzola (yellow card) 62'	Stadium: Ghelamco Arena; Attendance: 17,557; Referee: José María Sánchez Martínez (Spain)

===== Round of 16 =====
6 August 2020 Round of 16	Sevilla (Spain)	2–0	(Italy) Roma	Duisburg, Germany
18:55 CEST (UTC+02:00)	Reguilón 22'; En-Nesyri 44'; Diego Carlos (yellow card) 61'; Jordán (yellow card) 90+2'	Report	Kolarov (yellow card) 45+3'; Pellegrini (yellow card) 86'; Mancini (red card) 90+10'	Stadium: MSV-Arena; Attendance: 0 Referee: Björn Kuipers (Netherlands)
Note: Match was meant to be played behind closed doors due to concerns over the COVID-19 pandemic in Spain, however, on 11 March the match was postponed from its original date of 12 March due to concerns over the pandemic. On 17 June, the match was rescheduled to 6 August to be played in a single leg at MSV-Arena in Germany, and behind closed doors due to concerns over the COVID-19 pandemic in Europe.

== Statistics ==
=== Appearances and goals ===
No.	Pos	Nat	Player	Total		Serie A		Coppa Italia		Europa League	
No.	Pos	Nat	Player	Apps	Goals	Apps	Goals	Apps	Goals	Apps	Goals
Goalkeepers
13	GK	(Spain) ESP	Pau López	42	0	32	0	2	0	7+1	0
63	GK	(Brazil) BRA	Daniel Fuzato	1	0	1	0	0	0	0	0
83	GK	(Italy) ITA	Antonio Mirante	7	0	5	0	0	0	2	0
Defenders
2	DF	(Italy) ITA	Davide Zappacosta	9	0	3+6	0	0	0	0	0
5	DF	(Brazil) BRA	Juan Jesus	5	0	1+3	0	0	0	1	0
6	DF	(England) ENG	Chris Smalling	37	3	29+1	3	2	0	5	0
11	DF	(Serbia) SRB	Aleksandar Kolarov	42	7	30+2	7	2	0	7+1	0
15	DF	(Turkey) TUR	Mert Çetin	6	0	2+4	0	0	0	0	0
18	DF	(Italy) ITA	Davide Santon	21	0	7+8	0	0+1	0	3+2	0
20	DF	(Argentina) ARG	Federico Fazio	23	2	14+2	1	0	0	6+1	1
23	DF	(Italy) ITA	Gianluca Mancini	41	1	31+1	1	2	0	7	0
33	DF	(Brazil) BRA	Bruno Peres	19	2	12+4	2	0+2	0	1	0
37	DF	(Italy) ITA	Leonardo Spinazzola	32	2	18+6	1	0	0	7+1	1
41	DF	(Brazil) BRA	Roger Ibañez	10	0	7+2	0	0	0	1	0
61	DF	(Italy) ITA	Riccardo Calafiori	1	0	1	0	0	0	0	0
Midfielders
4	MF	(Italy) ITA	Bryan Cristante	33	1	18+8	1	2	0	5	0
7	MF	(Italy) ITA	Lorenzo Pellegrini	34	3	26+1	1	2	2	2+3	0
14	MF	(Spain) ESP	Gonzalo Villar	11	0	2+7	0	0	0	0+2	0
21	MF	(France) FRA	Jordan Veretout	43	7	30+3	6	0+2	0	6+2	1
22	MF	(Italy) ITA	Nicolò Zaniolo	33	8	16+10	6	0	0	6+1	2
27	MF	(Argentina) ARG	Javier Pastore	15	0	5+6	0	0	0	4	0
42	MF	(Guinea) GUI	Amadou Diawara	30	1	19+3	1	2	0	5+1	0
77	MF	(Armenia) ARM	Henrikh Mkhitaryan	27	9	16+6	9	0	0	3+2	0
Forwards
8	FW	(Argentina) ARG	Diego Perotti	26	6	10+11	5	1	0	2+2	1
9	FW	(Bosnia and Herzegovina) BIH	Edin Džeko	43	19	31+4	16	0	0	8	3
17	FW	(Turkey) TUR	Cengiz Ünder	23	3	10+8	3	2	0	1+2	0
19	FW	(Croatia) CRO	Nikola Kalinić	19	5	6+9	5	2	0	1+1	0
31	FW	(Spain) ESP	Carles Pérez	17	2	5+9	1	0	0	2+1	1
99	FW	(Netherlands) NED	Justin Kluivert	31	7	19+3	4	1+1	0	6+1	3
Players transferred out during the season
24	MF	(Italy) ITA	Alessandro Florenzi	18	0	12+2	0	2	0	1+1	0
48	FW	(Italy) ITA	Mirko Antonucci	4	0	0+2	0	0	0	0+2	0

Last updated: 6 August 2020
Source: Competitions

=== Goalscorers ===
Rank	No.	Pos	Nat	Name	Serie A	Coppa Italia	Europa League	Total
1	9	FW	(Bosnia and Herzegovina)	Edin Džeko	16	0	3	19
2	77	MF	(Armenia)	Henrikh Mkhitaryan	9	0	0	9
3	22	MF	(Italy)	Nicolò Zaniolo	6	0	2	8
4	11	DF	(Serbia)	Aleksandar Kolarov	7	0	0	7
4	99	FW	(Netherlands)	Justin Kluivert	4	0	3	7
6	21	MF	(France)	Jordan Veretout	6	0	1	7
7	8	FW	(Argentina)	Diego Perotti	5	0	1	6
8	19	FW	(Croatia)	Nikola Kalinić	5	0	0	5
9	6	DF	(England)	Chris Smalling	3	0	0	3
9	7	MF	(Italy)	Lorenzo Pellegrini	1	2	0	3
9	17	FW	(Turkey)	Cengiz Ünder	3	0	0	3
12	20	DF	(Argentina)	Federico Fazio	1	0	1	2
12	31	FW	(Spain)	Carles Pérez	1	0	1	2
12	33	DF	(Brazil)	Bruno Peres	2	0	0	2
12	37	DF	(Italy)	Leonardo Spinazzola	1	0	1	2
16	4	MF	(Italy)	Bryan Cristante	1	0	0	1
16	23	DF	(Italy)	Gianluca Mancini	1	0	0	1
16	42	MF	(Guinea)	Amadou Diawara	1	0	0	1
Own goals					4	1	1	6
Totals					77	3	14	94

Last updated: 6 August 2020

=== Clean sheets ===
Rank	No.	Pos	Nat	Name	Serie A	Coppa Italia	Europa League	Total
1	13	GK	(Spain)	Pau López	5	1	3	9
2	83	GK	(Italy)	Antonio Mirante	2	0	0	2
Totals					7	1	3	11

Last updated: 6 August 2020

=== Disciplinary record ===
No.	Pos	Nat	Name	Serie A			Coppa Italia			Europa League			Total		
No.	Pos	Nat	Name	Yellow card	(yellow card) (yellow-red card)	Red card	Yellow card	(yellow card) (yellow-red card)	Red card	Yellow card	(yellow card) (yellow-red card)	Red card	Yellow card	(yellow card) (yellow-red card)	Red card
13	GK	(Spain)	Pau López	3	0	0	0	0	0	0	0	0	3	0	0
63	GK	(Brazil)	Daniel Fuzato	0	0	0	0	0	0	0	0	0	0	0	0
83	GK	(Italy)	Antonio Mirante	0	0	0	0	0	0	0	0	0	0	0	0
2	DF	(Italy)	Davide Zappacosta	0	0	0	0	0	0	0	0	0	0	0	0
5	DF	(Brazil)	Juan Jesus	2	0	0	0	0	0	1	0	0	3	0	0
6	DF	(England)	Chris Smalling	3	0	0	0	0	0	2	0	0	5	0	0
11	DF	(Serbia)	Aleksandar Kolarov	6	0	0	0	0	0	2	0	0	8	0	0
15	DF	(Turkey)	Mert Çetin	2	1	0	0	0	0	0	0	0	2	1	0
18	DF	(Italy)	Davide Santon	4	0	0	0	0	0	1	0	0	5	0	0
20	DF	(Argentina)	Federico Fazio	2	0	1	0	0	0	0	0	0	2	0	1
23	DF	(Italy)	Gianluca Mancini	14	1	0	0	0	0	1	0	1	15	1	1
33	DF	(Brazil)	Bruno Peres	3	0	0	0	0	0	0	0	0	3	0	0
37	DF	(Italy)	Leonardo Spinazzola	2	0	0	0	0	0	1	0	0	3	0	0
41	DF	(Brazil)	Roger Ibañez	1	0	0	0	0	0	0	0	0	1	0	0
4	MF	(Italy)	Bryan Cristante	7	0	1	1	0	0	1	0	0	9	0	1
7	MF	(Italy)	Lorenzo Pellegrini	6	1	0	1	0	0	1	0	0	8	1	0
14	MF	(Spain)	Gonzalo Villar	3	0	0	0	0	0	0	0	0	3	0	0
21	MF	(France)	Jordan Veretout	6	0	0	0	0	0	3	0	0	9	0	0
22	MF	(Italy)	Nicolò Zaniolo	8	0	0	0	0	0	1	0	0	9	0	0
24	MF	(Italy)	Alessandro Florenzi	5	0	0	0	0	0	0	0	0	5	0	0
27	MF	(Argentina)	Javier Pastore	0	0	0	0	0	0	0	0	0	0	0	0
42	MF	(Guinea)	Amadou Diawara	4	0	0	0	0	0	3	0	0	7	0	0
53	MF	(Italy)	Alessio Riccardi	0	0	0	0	0	0	0	0	0	0	0	0
77	MF	(Armenia)	Henrikh Mkhitaryan	5	0	0	0	0	0	0	0	0	5	0	0
8	FW	(Argentina)	Diego Perotti	3	0	1	0	0	0	0	0	0	3	0	1
9	FW	(Bosnia and Herzegovina)	Edin Džeko	4	0	0	0	0	0	0	0	0	4	0	0
17	FW	(Turkey)	Cengiz Ünder	2	0	0	1	0	0	0	0	0	3	0	0
19	FW	(Croatia)	Nikola Kalinić	1	0	0	0	0	0	0	0	0	1	0	0
48	FW	(Italy)	Mirko Antonucci	1	0	0	0	0	0	1	0	0	2	0	0
99	FW	(Netherlands)	Justin Kluivert	4	1	0	0	0	0	2	0	0	6	1	0
Totals				103	4	3	3	0	0	20	0	1	126	4	4

Last updated: 6 August 2020
