= Kenneth Kluivert =

Surinamese footballer (born 1941)

Personal information
- Full name: Kenneth Ramon Kluivert
- Date of birth: 26 August 1941 (age 85)
- Place of birth: Moengo, Surinam
- Position: Left winger

Senior career*
Years	Team	Apps	(Gls)
1961–1970	Robinhood	345	(366)
- Real Sranang

International career
1964–1965	Suriname	3	(2)
- * Club domestic league appearances and goals

Kenneth Ramon Kluivert (born 26 August 1941) is a Surinamese former footballer who played as a left winger for S.V. Robinhood in the SVB Hoofdklasse, and for the Suriname national football team.

He is the father of former Dutch international football player and manager Patrick Kluivert, and the grandfather of footballers Justin, Ruben and Shane Kluivert.

== Club career ==
Born in Moengo, Kluivert began his senior football career in the SVB Hoofdklasse playing for S.V. Robinhood from Paramaribo. Playing on the left winger, Kluivert was a star in his native Suriname, where he would finish the season as top scorer of Robinhood on several occasions. Commonly known by his nickname "Bossa Nova", Kluivert was renowned for his crosses into the box, his free kicks and his goal scoring abilities. Together with Edwin Schal and Gerrit Niekoop he would form the dangerous attack of Robinhood, only rivaled by S.V. Transvaal at the time, during a period which helped shape the footballing landscape in the country, and the Surinaamse Klassieker, the strongest rivalry in Suriname. In 1970, Kluivert relocated to the Netherlands with his family. He was considered one of the best players in the club's history. During his tenure with Robinhood, he helped his club to two national titles in 1961 and 1964 in a period which was dominated by rivals Transvaal. He later played for the amateur football club Real Sranang in the Netherlands.

== International career ==
Kluivert played for the Suriname national football team. On 20 March 1964 he made his first appearance in an official match, playing in the 1964 Summer Olympics qualifiers against Panama, in a 6–1 win, scoring the opener on his debut. He scored his second goal on 14 March 1965 against Trinidad and Tobago, in a 1966 FIFA World Cup qualification match at home which ended in a 6–1 win once more.

== Personal life ==
Kluivert was married to Lidwina and is now married to Jolanda. His ex-wife was born in Willemstad, Curaçao, in the former Netherlands Antilles to a Surinamese father and a Curaçaoan mother, moving to Suriname at age 23 where she met Kenneth. Their first son Renato, and their daughter Natascia were born in Suriname, before the family relocated to Amsterdam, Netherlands in 1970, where Patrick Kluivert was born six years later. Their youngest son Patrick, was recruited to the Ajax Youth Academy at age 7 where he progressed through the ranks, becoming one of the most successful players in Dutch football history, finishing his playing career as top scorer of the Netherlands national team. The four children of Patrick, the grandchildren of Kenneth Kluivert, also had footballing careers: Quincy (born 1997), Justin (born 1999), Ruben (born 2001), and Shane (born 2007).

== Career statistics ==
=== International goals ===
Scores and results list Suriname' goal tally first.

Goal	Date	Venue	Opponent	Score	Result	Competition
1.	20 March 1964	Estadio Olímpico Universitario, Mexico City, Mexico	Panama	1–0	6–1	1964 Summer Olympics qualification
2.	14 March 1965	National Stadion, Paramaribo, Suriname	Trinidad and Tobago	3–1	6–1	1966 FIFA World Cup qualification

== Honours ==
S.V. Robinhood

- Hoofdklasse: 1961, 1964
