= Flank =

Flank may refer to:

- Flank (anatomy), part of the abdomen
  - Flank steak, a cut of beef
  - Part of the external anatomy of a horse
- Flank speed, a nautical term
- Flank opening, a chess opening
- A term in Australian rules football
- A term in association football
- The side of a military unit, as in a flanking maneuver
- Flanking, a sound path in architectural acoustics
- Flanking region, a region of DNA in directionality
- Rift flank (synonymous of rift shoulder), mountains belt on the sides of extensional rift basins

== See also ==
- Flanker (disambiguation)
