= List of Feyenoord players =

Feyenoord is a Dutch professional football club from Rotterdam, that plays in the Eredivisie. Founded as Wilhelmina in 1908, the club changed its name in 1912 to SC Feijenoord (since 1973 Feyenoord for international reasons) and moved to De Kuip in 1937. Feyenoord is one of the most successful clubs in the Netherlands, winning 16 Eredivisie titles, 14 KNVB Cups and five Johan Cruijff Shields. The club also has won one European Cup, two UEFA Cups and one Intercontinental Cup. The club is historically one of the three clubs that have dominated the Eredivisie (first tier) of Dutch football, the others being Ajax and PSV. These three clubs have always played in the Eredivisie, since its inception in 1952, and have never been relegated to lower divisions.

== List of players ==
Appearances and goals are for first-team league matches only, including both the Netherlands Football League Championship and Eredivisie.

Statistics correct as of 15 November 2025.

Table headers

- Nationality – If a player played international football, the country/countries he played for are shown. Otherwise, the player's nationality is given as their country of birth.
- Feyenoord career – The year of the player's first appearance for Feyenoord to the year of his last appearance.
- Appearances – The number of league games played.
- Goals – The number of league goals scored.

Name	Nationality	Position	Feyenoord career	Appearances	Goals
Anass Achahbar	Netherlands	Forward	2011-2016	33	6
Jorge Acuña	Chile	Midfielder	2002-2004	15	0
Maikel Aerts	Netherlands	Goalkeeper	2005-2006	8	0
Karim El Ahmadi	Morocco	Midfielder	2008-2012, 2014-2018	216	14
Anel Ahmedhodžić	Bosnia and Herzegovina	Defender	2025–	11	0
Roger Albertsen	Norway	Midfielder	1979-1980	28	1
Patrick Allotey	Ghana	Defender	1996-2001	5	0
Sofyan Amrabat	Morocco	Midfielder	2017-2018	21	1
Plamen Andreev	Bulgaria	Goalkeeper	2025–	1	0
Samuel Armenteros	Sweden	Forward	2013-2014	19	1
Mauricio Aros	Chile	Midfielder	2001-2002	5	0
Fredrik Aursnes	Norway	Midfielder	2021–2022	35	1
Yassin Ayoub	Morocco	Midfielder	2018-2019	19	2
Marouan Azarkan	Netherlands	Forward	2019-	2	0
Gábor Babos	Hungary	Goalkeeper	2004-2005	24	0
Stefan Babović	Serbia	Midfielder	2009-2010	11	2
André Bahia	Brazil	Defender	2004-2011	178	17
Aad Bak	Netherlands	Midfielder	1955-1962	133	11
Otman Bakkal	Netherlands	Midfielder	2011-2012, 2013-2014	37	9
Aliou Baldé	Senegal	Forward	2021-	4	0
Luuk Balkestein	Netherlands	Defender	1980-1982	18	0
Naoufal Bannis	Netherlands	Forward	2019-	12	2
Jaap Barendregt	Netherlands	Forward	1925-1937	238	196
Peter Barendse	Netherlands	Midfielder	1985-1989	78	8
Bilal Başaçıkoğlu	Turkey	Forward	2014-2018	76	6
Cole Bassett	United States	Midfielder	2022	8	0
Bruno Basto	Portugal	Defender	2004-2005	18	1
Michel Bastos	Brazil	Defender	2001-2002	0	0
Sven van Beek	Netherlands	Defender	2013-2020	116	3
Thomas Beelen	Netherlands	Defender	2023–	45	1
Mario Been	Netherlands	Midfielder	1982-1988	137	53
Thomas van den Belt	Netherlands	Midfielder	2023–2024	9	0
Mimeirhel Benita	Netherlands	Defender	2022	2	0
Rinus Bennaars	Netherlands	Midfielder	1959-1964	133	41
Jan Bens	Netherlands	Midfielder	1933-1938	76	25
Peter van den Berg	Netherlands	Defender	2003-2004	25	1
Gerard Bergholtz	Netherlands	Midfielder	1961-1965	101	23
Steven Berghuis	Netherlands	Midfielder	2016-2021	149	70
Clyde Best	Bermuda	Forward	1998-2001	23	3
Jhon van Beukering	Netherlands	Fordward	2010-2011	3	0
Justin Bijlow	Netherlands	Goalkeeper	2017–	108	0
Harry Bild	Sweden	Forward	1965-1967	52	39
Diego Biseswar	Suriname	Midfielder	2005-2012	88	11
Fredrik Bjørkan	Norway	Defender	2022	1	0
Fred Blankemeijer	Netherlands	Defender	1949-1952	28	0
Daan den Bleijker	Netherlands	Forward	1950-1959	107	30
Regi Blinker	Netherlands	Midfielder	1986-1996	238	45
George Boateng	Netherlands	Midfielder	1995-1998	68	1
Jean-Paul Boëtius	Netherlands	Forward	2012-2015, 2017-2018	109	24
Henryk Bolesta	Poland	Goalkeeper	1989	7	0
Mariano Bombarda	Argentina	Forward	2002-2004	20	4
Gonçalo Borges	Portugal	Forward	2025–	3	1
Jordan Bos	Australia	Defender	2025–	9	2
Johan Boskamp	Netherlands	Midfielder	1966-1974	102	14
Pascal Bosschaart	Netherlands	Midfielder	2004-2006	53	1
Tinus Bosselaar	Netherlands	Forward	1954-1956	49	12
Paul Bosvelt	Netherlands	Midfielder	1997-2003	177	33
Peter Bosz	Netherlands	Midfielder	1991-1996	155	6
René Bot	Netherlands	Defender	1997-1999	6	0
Eric Botteghin	Brazil	Defender	2015-2021	133	9
Achraf El Bouchataoui	Netherlands	Midfielder	2021	3	0
Khalid Boulahrouz	Netherlands	Defender	2014-2015	12	0
Ali Boussaboun	Morocco	Forward	2005-2007	36	6
Saïd Boutahar	Netherlands	Midfielder	2001-2002	2	0
Karel Bouwens	Netherlands	Forward	1979-1982	59	13
Frans Bouwmeester	Netherlands	Forward	1960-1966	139	44
Róbert Boženík	Slovakia	Forward	2020-	21	3
Joep Brandes	Netherlands	Forward	1947-1950	3	1
Marcel Brands	Netherlands	Midfielder	1988-1990	61	6
Stanley Brard	Netherlands	Defender	1976-1986	208	10
Virgil Breetveld	Netherlands	Forward	1987-1988	4	0
Giovanni van Bronckhorst	Netherlands	Defender	1993–1998, 2007–2010	191	30
Luigi Bruins	Netherlands	Midfielder	2007-2011	70	9
Richard Budding	Netherlands	Forward	1977-1982	121	10
Hugo Bueno	Spain	Defender	2024–2025	20	0
Thomas Buffel	Belgium	Midfielder	1999-2005	80	34
Danny Buijs	Netherlands	Midfielder	2006-2009	51	6
Jordy Buijs	Netherlands	Defender	2007-2008	0	0
Bertus Bul	Netherlands	Defender	1971-1930	187	12
Mukwayanzo Bulayima	Congo-Kinshasa	Goalkeeper	1993-1997	0	0
Ezequiel Bullaude	Argentina	Midfielder	2022–2023	9	0
Wouter Burger	Netherlands	Midfielder	2019-2021	9	0
Jerson Cabral	Netherlands	Forward	2010-2012	52	8
Ellery Cairo	Netherlands	Forward	1994-2000	29	5
Willy Carbo	Netherlands	Forward	1984	6	0
Julián Carranza	Argentina	Forward	2024–	21	4
Stephano Carrillo	Mexico	Forward	2025–	3	0
Luc Castaignos	Netherlands	Forward	2009-2011	37	15
Romeo Castelen	Netherlands	Forward	2004-2007	65	20
Benjamin De Ceulaer	Belgium	Forward	2005-2006	2	0
Angelos Charisteas	Greece	Forward	2006-2007	28	9
Sekou Cissé	Cote d'Ivoire	Forward	2009-2014	56	14
Geoffrey Claeys	Belgium	Midfielder	1996-1998	45	0
Jordy Clasie	Netherlands	Midfielder	2010-2015, 2018-2019	162	9
Tim de Cler	Netherlands	Defender	2007-2011	87	1
Pieter Collen	Belgium	Defender	2001-2007	14	2
David Connolly	Ireland	Forward	1997-2001	25	7
Christian Conteh	Germany	Forward	2020-	2	0
Johan Cruyff	Netherlands	Midfielder	1983-1984	33	11
Julio Ricardo Cruz	Argentina	Forward	1997-2000	86	44
Joop van Daele	Netherlands	Defender	1967-1976	123	6
Marian Damaschin	Romania	Forward	1991-1992	29	9
Danilo	Brazil	Forward	2022–2023	34	10
Darley	Brazil	Goalkeeper	2007-2012	5	0
Lorenzo Davids	Netherlands	Midfielder	2006-2007	1	0
Jordy van Deelen	Netherlands	Defender	2012-2014	1	0
Jan van Deinsen	Netherlands	Midfielder	1976-1983	164	23
Joris Delle	France	Goalkeeper	2019	2	0
Giorgi Demetradze	Georgia	Forward	1997-1998	8	0
Denilson	Brazil	Forward	1996-1997		
Timothy Derijck	Belgium	Defender	2005-2009	23	1
Cyriel Dessers	Nigeria	Forward	2021-2022	27	9
Gaoussou Diarra	Mali	Forward	2025–	2	0
Mark Diemers	Netherlands	Midfielder	2020-2021	31	3
René van Dieren	Netherlands	Midfielder	1998-2001	5	0
Rob van Dijk	Netherlands	Goalkeeper	1992-1996	51	0
Kees van Dijke	Netherlands	Defender	1922-1934	256	28
Kevin Diks	Netherlands	Defender	2017-2018	23	0
Javairô Dilrosun	Netherlands	Forward	2022–2024	39	6
Jean Carlos Dondé	Brazil	Defender	2003-2006	9	0
Royston Drenthe	Netherlands	Midfielder	2005-2007	29	0
Jerzy Dudek	Poland	Goalkeeper	1996-2001	139	0
Theo van Duivenbode	Netherlands	Defender	1969-1973	83	1
Henk Duut	Netherlands	Defender	1982-1986	104	20
Sherif Ekramy	Egypt	Goalkeeper	2005-2009	7	0
Omar Elabdellaoui	Norway	Midfielder	2012	5	0
Eljero Elia	Netherlands	Midfielder	2015-2017	55	17
Johan Elmander	Sweden	Forward	2000-2004	39	3
Lars Elstrup	Denmark	Forward	1986-1988	65	9
Brett Emerton	Australia	Midfielder	2000-2003	92	11
Ton van Engelen	Netherlands	Goalkeeper	1979-1982	43	0
Kermit Erasmus	South Africa	Forward	2008-2010	4	0
John Eriksen	Denmark	Forward	1985-1986	31	22
Dick Ernst	Netherlands	Forward	1976-1978	9	0
Harvey Esajas	Netherlands	Defender	1993-1996	8	1
Jan Everse	Netherlands	Defender	1972-1977	46	2
Ab Fafié	Netherlands	Defender	1959-1963	4	0
Mark Farrington	England	Forward	1991	5	1
Leroy Fer	Netherlands	Midfielder	2007-2011, 2019-2021	152	16
Daniel Fernández Artola	Spain	Defender	2009-2012	10	0
Guyon Fernandez	Netherlands	Forward	2011-2013	28	7
Peter Feteris	Netherlands	Forward	1972-1973	4	0
Chris Feijt	Netherlands	Goalkeeper	1963-1964	1	0
Piet Fransen	Netherlands	Midfielder	1965-1966	28	4
Henk Fräser	Netherlands	Defender	1990-1999	138	15
Jean-Paul van Gastel	Netherlands	Midfielder	1996-2001	121	25
Martin van Geel	Netherlands	Midfielder	1988-1990	50	24
Ruud Geels	Netherlands	Forward	1966-1970	89	46
Lutsharel Geertruida	Netherlands	Defender	2018–2024	144	19
Hossam Ghaly	Egypt	Midfielder	2003-2006	49	3
Cory Gibbs	United States	Defender	2004-2006	15	1
Cor van der Gijp	Netherlands	Forward	1955–1964	233	177
Santiago Giménez	Mexico	Forward	2022–2025	73	45
Gláucio	Brazil	Midfielder	1995-1997	10	3
Ulrich van Gobbel	Netherlands	Defender	1990-1995	222	5
Ed de Goey	Netherlands	Goalkeeper	1990-1997	235	0
Facundo González	Uruguay	Defender	2024–2025	6	0
Bart Goor	Belgium	Midfielder	2004-2005	34	7
John Goossens	Netherlands	Midfielder	2012-2014	30	3
Dean Gorré	Suriname	Midfielder	1992-1995	42	6
Edwin de Graaf	Netherlands	Midfielder	2004-2006	6	0
Ronald Graafland	Netherlands	Goalkeeper	1998-2000, 2011-2015	1	0
Patricio Graff	Argentina	Defender	1996-1999	44	1
Serginho Greene	Netherlands	Defender	2005-2009	85	1
Stanislav Griga	Slovakia	Forward	1990-1992	43	9
Henk Groot	Netherlands	Forward	1963–1965	54	34
John Guidetti	Sweden	Forward	2011-2012	23	20
Ruud Gullit	Netherlands	Midfielder	1982–1985	85	31
Simon Gustafson	Sweden	Midfielder	2015-2016	17	3
Jonathan de Guzmán	Netherlands	Midfielder	2005-2010	109	23
Christian Gyan	Ghana	Defender	1997-2007	93	3
Guus Haak	Netherlands	Defender	1963-1970	164	16
Ferry de Haan	Netherlands	Defender	1998-2002	77	0
Ricky van Haaren	Netherlands	Midfielder	2010-2012	21	1
Ramon van Haaren	Netherlands	Defender	2001–2005	14	0
Anis Hadj Moussa	Algeria	Forward	2024–	41	12
Denzel Hall	Jamaica	Defender	2022-	2	0
Gustavo Hamer	Netherlands	Midfielder	2017	2	0
Dávid Hancko	Slovakia	Defender	2022–2025	97	10
Willem van Hanegem	Netherlands	Midfielder	1968–1976, 1981–1983	298	90
Mohamed El Hankouri	Netherlands	Forward	2016-2018	6	0
Emil Hansson	Norway	Midfielder	2017-2018	3	0
Pär Hansson	Sweden	Goalkeeper	2016	1	0
Ridgeciano Haps	Suriname	Defender	2017-2021	70	5
Quilindschy Hartman	Netherlands	Defender	2022–2025	61	2
Franz Hasil	Austria	Midfielder	1969–1973	112	34
Puck van Heel	Netherlands	Midfielder	1923–1940	322	34
Joop van der Heide	Netherlands	Defender	1935–1949	253	1
Jan-Arie van der Heijden	Netherlands	Defender	2015-2019	97	4
Ramon Hendriks	Netherlands	Defender	2021-	8	0
Jorrit Hendrix	Netherlands	Midfielder	2022	9	1
Jos van Herpen	Netherlands	Defender	1986-1988	52	2
Ruud Heus	Netherlands	Defender	1986–1996	173	8
Joop Hiele	Netherlands	Goalkeeper	1977-1990	318	0
Hans van der Hoek	Netherlands	Defender	1950-1960	55	3
André Hoekstra	Netherlands	Midfielder	1981-1988	181	65
Kevin Hofland	Netherlands	Defender	2007-2011	55	3
René Hofman	Netherlands	Forward	1986-1989	98	31
Nicky Hofs	Netherlands	Midfielder	2004–2009	68	21
Jesper Hogedoorn	Netherlands	Goalkeeper	2002-2006	1	0
Pierre van Hooijdonk	Netherlands	Forward	2001–2003, 2006-2007	98	60
Peter Houtman	Netherlands	Forward	1976–1977, 1978–1979, 1982–1985, 1988–1989	133	84
Mats van Huijgevoort	Netherlands	Defender	2011-2014	1	0
Stein Huysegems	Belgium	Forward	2006–2007	25	6
Hwang In-beom	South Korea	Midfielder	2024–	26	3
Oussama Idrissi	Morocco	Forward	2022–2023	27	4
Edgar Ié	Guinea-Bissau	Defender	2019-2020	11	0
Lex Immers	Netherlands	Midfielder	2012-2016	101	31
Rinus Israël	Netherlands	Defender	1966–1974	219	21
Luka Ivanušec	Croatia	Forward	2023–	37	4
Tomasz Iwan	Poland	Midfielder	1995–1997	45	3
Rob Jacobs	Netherlands	Defender	1963–1965		
Johnny Jacobsen	Denmark	Midfielder	1980-1982	14	7
Alireza Jahanbakhsh	Iran	Forward	2021–2024	71	9
Daryl Janmaat	Netherlands	Defender	2012-2014	63	5
Michał Janota	Poland	Midfielder	2008-2010	6	0
Wim Jansen	Netherlands	Defender	1965–1980	422	34
Malcolm Jeng	Sweden	Defender	2025–	1	0
George Johnston	Scotland	Defender	2020	4	0
Brad Jones	Australia	Goalkeeper	2016-2018	63	0
Chaly Jones	Curaçao	Midfielder	1996–1997	1	0
Theo de Jong	Netherlands	Midfielder	1972–1977	163	61
Nicolai Jørgensen	Denmark	Forward	2016-2021	118	48
Jerry St. Juste	Netherlands	Defender	2017-2019	39	5
Volkan Kahraman	Austria	Midfielder	1997-2000	1	0
Bonaventure Kalou	Côte d'Ivoire	Midfielder	1997-2003	149	35
Salomon Kalou	Côte d'Ivoire	Forward	2003-2006	69	35
Piet Kantebeen	Netherlands	Forward	1935-1938	78	49
Rick Karsdorp	Netherlands	Midfielder	2014-2017, 2019-2020	93	2
Neraysho Kasanwirjo	Netherlands	Defender	2023–	7	0
Colin Kazim-Richards	Turkey	Forward	2014-2015	38	12
Liam Kelly	Ireland	Midfielder	2019	1	0
Gerard Kerkum	Netherlands	Defender	1951-1965	349	13
Piet Keur	Netherlands	Forward	1989-1991	42	15
Ove Kindvall	Sweden	Forward	1966-1971	144	129
József Kiprich	Hungary	Forward	1989–1995	129	53
Jan Klaassens	Netherlands	Midfielder	1959–1964	140	7
Abe Knoop	Netherlands	Goalkeeper	1983-1984	1	0
Glenn Kobussen	Netherlands	Midfielder	2008-2009	1	0
Ronald Koeman	Netherlands	Midfielder	1995–1997	61	20
Orkun Kökçü	Turkey	Midfielder	2018–2023	119	23
Joonas Kolkka	Finland	Midfielder	2006–2007	22	3
Terence Kongolo	Netherlands	Defender	2012-2017	106	1
Bert Konterman	Netherlands	Defender	1998-2000	65	4
Adriaan Koonings	Netherlands	Forward	1915-1930	183	100
Igor Korneev	Russia	Midfielder	1997–2002	79	20
Michel van de Korput	Netherlands	Defender	1974–1980, 1983–1985		
Hans Kraay	Netherlands	Defender	1960–1968	192	2
Michiel Kramer	Netherlands	Forward	2015-2017	55	18
Reinier Kreijermaat	Netherlands	Midfielder	1959-1967	147	29
Jørgen Kristensen	Denmark	Midfielder	1972–1976	134	43
Tommy Kristiansen	Denmark	Forward	1978	10	1
Tom Krommendijk	Netherlands	Midfielder	1988-1989	1	0
Wilhelm Kreuz	Austria	Forward	1974-1978	132	58
Piet Kruiver	Netherlands	Forward	1962–1966	94	74
Dirk Kuyt	Netherlands	Forward	2003–2006, 2015-2017	164	102
Harry van der Laan	Netherlands	Forward	1990-1991	22	9
Attila Ladinszky	Hungary	Fordward	1971–1973	25	9
Carlo l'Ami	Netherlands	Goalkeeper	2002-2003	3	0
Kostas Lamprou	Greece	Goalkeeper	2009-2015	14	0
Denny Landzaat	Netherlands	Midfielder	2008–2010	38	5
Søren Larsen	Denmark	Forward	2011	6	0
Henrik Larsson	Sweden	Forward	1993–1997	101	26
Sam Larsson	Sweden	Midfielder	2017-2020	72	14
Theo Laseroms	Netherlands	Defender	1968–1972	123	4
Danko Lazović	Serbia	Forward	2003–2006	41	9
Lee Chun-Soo	South Korea	Forward	2007-2009	12	0
Kelvin Leerdam	Suriname	Midfielder	2008-2013	97	5
Carlo de Leeuw	Netherlands	Forward	1978-1982	45	7
Henk van Leeuwen	Netherlands	Forward	1969-1972	2	0
Gerard van der Lem	Netherlands	Midfielder	1977-1980	72	9
Jacob Lensky	Canada	Defender	2007-2008	1	0
Philippe Léonard	Belgium	Defender	2006-2007	2	0
Jordan Lotomba	Switzerland	Defender	2024–	11	1
Philippe Sandler	Netherlands	Defender	2022	2	0
Leonardo dos Santos Silva	Brazil	Midfielder	2001–2004	11	0
Leonardo Vitor Santiago	Brazil	Forward	2000–2005	55	4
Tscheu La Ling	Netherlands	Midfielder	1985-1986	18	1
Cyle Larin	Canada	Forward	2025–	5	0
Ondřej Lingr	Czech Republic	Midfielder	2023–2024	20	3
Bryan Linssen	Netherlands	Forward	2020-2022	63	21
Jan Linssen	Netherlands	Forward	1932-1954	337	91
Patrick Lodewijks	Netherlands	Goalkeeper	2002–2007	74	0
John van Loen	Netherlands	Forward	1993–1995	54	17
Ton Lokhoff	Netherlands	Midfielder	1988-1991	79	7
Glenn Loovens	Netherlands	Defender	2001-2006	27	0
Marcos López	Peru	Defender	2022–2024	32	0
Theo Lucius	Netherlands	Defender	2006-2009	74	6
Michael Lumb	Denmark	Defender	2010-2011	2	0
Anthony Lurling	Netherlands	Forward	2002-2005	57	8
Rob Maas	Netherlands	Defender	1993-1996	69	5
Gérson Magrão	Brazil	Midfielder	2004-2007	6	0
Roy Makaay	Netherlands	Forward	2007-2010	83	36
Tyrell Malacia	Netherlands	Defender	2017-2022	98	4
Adri van Male	Netherlands	Goalkeeper	1930-1940	221	2
Zbigniew Małkowski	Poland	Goalkeeper	2000-2005	1	0
Aad Mansveld	Netherlands	Defender	1977-1979	35	8
Elvis Manu	Netherlands	Forward	2012-2015	32	8
Ofir Marciano	Israel	Goalkeeper	2021–2023	12	0
Nick Marsman	Netherlands	Goalkeeper	2019-2021	23	0
Cuco Martina	Curaçao	Defender	2019	11	0
Bruno Martins Indi	Netherlands	Defender	2010-2014	102	5
Joris Mathijsen	Netherlands	Defender	2012–2015	57	1
Marcel Meeuwis	Netherlands	Midfielder	2010-2011	12	0
Pauke Meijers	Netherlands	Midfielder	1957-1961	79	22
Harry Melis	Netherlands	Forward	1976-1979	44	5
John Metgod	Netherlands	Defender	1988–1994	164	13
Antoni Milambo	Netherlands	Midfielder	2023–2025	40	4
Yankuba Minteh	Gambia	Forward	2023–2024	27	10
Dave Mitchell	Australia	Forward	1987-89	40	12
Jeyland Mitchell	Costa Rica	Defender	2024–	1	0
Ryo Miyaichi	Japan	Midfielder	2011	12	3
Jakub Moder	Poland	Midfielder	2025–	14	3
Kamohelo Mokotjo	South Africa	Midfielder	2009-2013	35	0
Keje Molenaar	Netherlands	Defender	1985-1988	100	11
Michael Mols	Netherlands	Forward	2007-2009	36	7
Ken Monkou	Netherlands	Defender	1985–1988	43	2
Eduardo Bustos Montoya	Argentina	Forward	1997	12	1
Coen Moulijn	Netherlands	Midfielder	1955–1972	487	84
Patrick Mtiliga	Denmark	Defender	1999-2006	22	0
Erwin Mulder	Netherlands	Goalkeeper	2007–2008, 2009-2015	120	0
Jan Mulder	Netherlands	Defender	1989-1990	16	1
Chris-Kévin Nadje	Ivory Coast	Midfielder	2024–	8	0
Luciano Narsingh	Netherlands	Forward	2019-2020	24	3
Noah Naujoks	Netherlands	Midfielder	2022	2	0
Robin Nelisse	Netherlands	Forward	1997-2000	14	4
Miquel Nelom	Suriname	Defender	2011-2017	125	2
Reiss Nelson	England	Forward	2021-2022	21	2
Ivan Nielsen	Denmark	Defender	1979–1986	195	14
Bart Nieuwkoop	Netherlands	Defender	2015–2021, 2023–	101	1
Norichio Nieveld	Netherlands	Defender	2008-2012	3	0
Gérard de Nooijer	Netherlands	Defender	2002-2004	22	0
Paul Nortan	Netherlands	Defender	1988-1993	73	0
René Notten	Netherlands	Midfielder	1977-1981	113	17
Mike Obiku	Nigeria	Forward	1992-1996	71	23
Steve Olfers	Netherlands	Defender	1999-2000	1	0
John Steen Olsen	Denmark	Forward	1974-1976	15	3
Shinji Ono	Japan	Midfielder	2001–2005	112	19
Ibrahim Osman	Ghana	Forward	2024–2025	22	3
Alexander Östlund	Sweden	Defender	2004-2006	33	0
John Owoeri	Nigeria	Defender	2005-2006	1	0
Oğuzhan Özyakup	Turkey	Midfielder	2020	2	1
Bas Paauwe	Netherlands	Midfielder	1929-1947	311	18
Jaap Paauwe	Netherlands	Midfielder	1928-1939	121	2
Patrick Paauwe	Netherlands	Midfielder	1998–2006	229	25
Igor Paixão	Brazil	Forward	2022–2025	93	32
Bram Panman	Netherlands	Goalkeeper	1956-1959	16	0
Sebastián Pardo	Chile	Midfielder	2002-2007	70	10
Jordao Pattinama	Netherlands	Forward	2008-2009	3	0
Marcus Pedersen	Norway	Defender	2021–2024	60	1
Luís Pedro	Netherlands	Forward	2008-2010	9	0
Graziano Pellè	Italy	Forward	2012-2014	57	50
Robin van Persie	Netherlands	Forward	2001–2004, 2017-2018	98	35
Jan Peters	Netherlands	Forward	1979-1981	61	29
Petur Petursson	Iceland	Forward	1978–1981, 1984–1985	88	49
Fernando Picun	Uruguay	Defender	1996-1998	36	3
Eddy Pieters Graafland	Netherlands	Goalkeeper	1958-1970	356	0
Kees Pijl	Netherlands	Forward	1921-1931	203	182
Brian Pinas	Netherlands	Midfielder	1998-1999	5	0
Rini Plasmans	Netherlands	Forward	1974-1977	1	1
Gerrit Plomp	Netherlands	Defender	1990-1993	12	0
Jan Plug	Netherlands	Defender	2025–	4	0
Hans Posthumus	Netherlands	Forward	1970-1972	13	8
Lucas Pratto	Argentina	Forward	2021	7	0
Mladen Ramljak	Croatia	Defender	1974-1977	68	1
Kaj Ramsteijn	Netherlands	Defender	2010-2014	7	0
Jacob Rasmussen	Denmark	Defender	2022–2023	10	1
Givairo Read	Netherlands	Defender	2024–	38	2
Errol Refos	Netherlands	Defender	1992-1996	59	0
Johnny Rep	Netherlands	Midfielder	1984–1986	43	5
Peter Ressel	Netherlands	Forward	1972-1975	97	43
Eddy Ridderhof	Netherlands	Midfielder	1976-1979	5	0
Wim Rijsbergen	Netherlands	Defender	1971–1978	173	1
Kees Rijvers	Netherlands	Midfielder	1957–1960	92	36
Nigel Robertha	Netherlands	Forward	2016	1	0
Piet Romeijn	Netherlands	Defender	1962-1971	201	3
Arie Romijn	Netherlands	Forward	1978-1979	1	0
Ed Roos	Netherlands	Forward	1985-1988	20	4
Tomasz Rząsa	Poland	Defender	1999–2003	90	1
Ioan Sabău	Romania	Midfielder	1990-1992	40	11
Marek Saganowski	Poland	Forward	1996-1997	7	0
Nuri Şahin	Turkey	Midfielder	2007–2008	29	6
Karim Saidi	Tunisia	Defender	2004–2008	46	1
Radoslav Samardžić	Serbia	Forward	1999-2000	12	1
Pablo Sánchez	Argentina	Forward	1996-1998	51	20
Leo Sauer	Slovakia	Forward	2023–	24	2
Ruben Schaken	Netherlands	Forward	2010-2015	113	18
Bart Schenkeveld	Netherlands	Defender	2009-2012	5	0
Dick Schneider	Netherlands	Defender	1970-1978	219	52
Lex Schoenmaker	Netherlands	Forward	1971–1975	104	49
Remco Schol	Netherlands	Defender	1989-1993	2	0
Arnold Scholten	Netherlands	Midfielder	1990–1995	165	20
Henk Schouten	Netherlands	Midfielder	1955-1963	194	125
Alfred Schreuder	Netherlands	Midfielder	1991-1993, 2003-2004, 2005–2007	33	0
Bernard Schuiteman	Netherlands	Defender	1995-1998	69	2
Marchanno Schultz	Netherlands	Midfielder	1990-1992	7	1
Jari Schuurman	Netherlands	Midfielder	2016	1	0
Marcos Senesi	Argentina	Defender	2019-2022	80	6
Krisztián Simon	Hungary	Forward	2011	8	0
Jerry Simons	Netherlands	Midfielder	1987-1988	1	0
Jimmy Simons	Netherlands	Midfielder	1988-1989	7	2
Harmeet Singh	Norway	Midfielder	2012-2014	7	0
Luis Sinisterra	Colombia	Forward	2018-2022	76	20
Aymen Sliti	Tunisia	Forward	2025–	11	2
Andwélé Slory	Netherlands	Midfielder	2007–2010	50	7
Jaden Slory	Netherlands	Forward	2025–	5	0
Gijs Smal	Netherlands	Defender	2024–	34	0
Włodzimierz Smolarek	Poland	Forward	1988–1990	46	13
Ebi Smolarek	Poland	Forward	2000-2005	68	12
Fyodor Smolov	Russia	Forward	2010	11	0
Mike Snoei	Netherlands	Defender	1981-1982	1	0
Ferne Snoyl	Netherlands	Defender	2003-2005	15	0
Michiel Sol	Netherlands	Defender	1994-1996	1	0
Song Chong-Gug	South Korea	Midfielder	2002–2005	53	2
Jan Sørensen	Denmark	Forward	1985-1986	25	9
Uroš Spajić	Serbia	Defender	2020-2021	19	0
Civard Sprockel	Netherlands	Defender	2001-2003	6	0
André Stafleu	Netherlands	Defender	1975-1978, 1978-1985	197	8
Piet Steenbergen	Netherlands	Midfielder	1946–1950, 1952–1959	229	25
Sem Steijn	Netherlands	Midfielder	2025–	11	6
Calvin Stengs	Netherlands	Midfielder	2023–	41	7
Gill Swerts	Belgium	Defender	2001-2005, 2011-2012	30	1
Sebastian Szymański	Poland	Midfielder	2022–2023	29	9
Mohamed Taabouni	Netherlands	Midfielder	2022–2023	5	0
Simon Tahamata	Netherlands	Midfielder	1984–1987	87	29
Renato Tapia	Peru	Midfielder	2016-2020	45	2
Oussama Targhalline	Morocco	Midfielder	2025–	14	1
Gaston Taument	Netherlands	Midfielder	1988-1997	204	45
Zier Tebbenhoff	Netherlands	Forward	1988-1990	21	2
João Teixeira	Portugal	Midfielder	2020-2021	19	0
Casper Tengstedt	Denmark	Forward	2025–	2	0
Dwight Tiendalli	Netherlands	Defender	2006–2009	35	0
Guus Til	Netherlands	Midfielder	2021-2022	32	15
Wim van Til	Netherlands	Midfielder	1973-1975, 1976-1984	128	19
Quinten Timber	Netherlands	Midfielder	2022–	83	16
Henk Timmer	Netherlands	Goalkeeper	2001–2002, 2006–2009	96	0
Tininho	Brazil	Midfielder	1998–2001	49	1
Jon Dahl Tomasson	Denmark	Forward	1998–2002, 2008–2011	158	75
Jens Toornstra	Netherlands	Midfielder	2014-2022	234	55
Cheick Touré	Netherlands	Forward	2017	1	0
Gernot Trauner	Austria	Defender	2021–	87	1
Eddy Treijtel	Netherlands	Goalkeeper	1968-1979	322	0
Sjaak Troost	Netherlands	Defender	1978–1992	325	5
Orlando Trustfull	Netherlands	Midfielder	1992–1996	78	13
Ayase Ueda	Japan	Forward	2023–	59	25
Luciano Valente	Netherlands	Midfielder	2025–	12	1
Michel Valke	Netherlands	Midfielder	1982-1983	32	5
Kick van der Vall	Netherlands	Midfielder	1963-1967	35	4
Marko Vejinović	Netherlands	Midfielder	2015-2017	25	0
Leen van de Velde	Netherlands	Midfielder	1950-1954	91	0
Cor Veldhoen	Netherlands	Defender	1956-1970	380	2
Hans Venneker	Netherlands	Defender	1964-1967	33	26
Dylan Vente	Netherlands	Forward	2017-2020	24	4
Leen Vente	Netherlands	Forward	1936-1940	82	65
Calvin Verdonk	Netherlands	Defender	2015-2019	14	1
Jan Verheijen	Netherlands	Forward	1976-1977	21	1
Wesley Verhoek	Netherlands	Midfielder	2012-2015	31	1
Kenneth Vermeer	Netherlands	Goalkeeper	2014-2019	99	0
Pierre Vermeulen	Netherlands	Forward	1980-1984	104	19
Aad Verschoof	Netherlands	Forward	1960-1963	4	0
Raymond Victoria	Netherlands	Defender	1989-1991	1	0
Aurelio Vidmar	Australia	Midfielder	1995	15	0
Tonny Vilhena	Netherlands	Midfielder	2012–2019	208	41
Tim Vincken	Netherlands	Forward	2004-2007	29	1
Jan de Visser	Netherlands	Midfielder	1999-2002	47	2
Ron Vlaar	Netherlands	Defender	2006–2012	132	8
Ruud Vormer	Netherlands	Midfielder	2012-2014	39	3
Harry Vos	Netherlands	Defender	1971–1977	127	1
Henk Vos	Netherlands	Forward	1996–1999	81	15
Peter van Vossen	Netherlands	Forward	1998–2001	73	10
Manus Vrauwdeunt	Netherlands	Midfielder	1931-1947	253	123
Mitchell te Vrede	Suriname	Forward	2012-2015	35	11
Stefan de Vrij	Netherlands	Forward	2009–2014	135	7
Arie de Vroet	Netherlands	Forward	1938-1950	230	31
Patrik Wålemark	Sweden	Forward	2022–2023	27	3
Jo Walhout	Netherlands	Defender	1958-1961	106	0
Henk Warnas	Netherlands	Defender	1963-1964	1	0
Tsuyoshi Watanabe	Japan	Defender	2025–	11	1
Kevin Wattamaleo	Netherlands	Midfielder	2008–2009	4	0
Timon Wellenreuther	Germany	Goalkeeper	2023–	69	0
Henk Wery	Netherlands	Forward	1968-1974	173	49
Mats Wieffer	Netherlands	Midfielder	2022–2024	54	6
Georginio Wijnaldum	Netherlands	Midfielder	2007–2011	111	23
Thijs Wijngaarde	Netherlands	Defender	1967-1969	1	0
Ben Wijnstekers	Netherlands	Defender	1975–1988	352	14
Luke Wilkshire	Australia	Defender	2014-2015	18	0
Rob Witschge	Netherlands	Midfielder	1991–1996	160	25
John de Wolf	Netherlands	Defender	1989–1994	111	9
Kees van Wonderen	Netherlands	Defender	1996–2004	203	5
Mark Wotte	Netherlands	Defender	1981-1982	4	0
Lucas Woudenberg	Netherlands	Defender	2013-2017	10	0
Gjivai Zechiël	Netherlands	Midfielder	2023–	11	0
Floor de Zeeuw	Netherlands	Goalkeeper	1922-1924	23	0
Ramiz Zerrouki	Tunisia	Midfielder	2023–	48	1
Andrey Zhelyazkov	Bulgaria	Midfielder	1981–1984	76	30
Wim van Zinnen	Netherlands	Midfielder	1977-1980	1	0
Edwin Zoetebier	Netherlands	Goalkeeper	1998–2000, 2001–2004	59	0
Gianni Zuiverloon	Netherlands	Defender	2004–2006	10	0
Clemens Zwijnenberg	Netherlands	Defender	1995-1997	34	2
