= List of Feyenoord internationals =

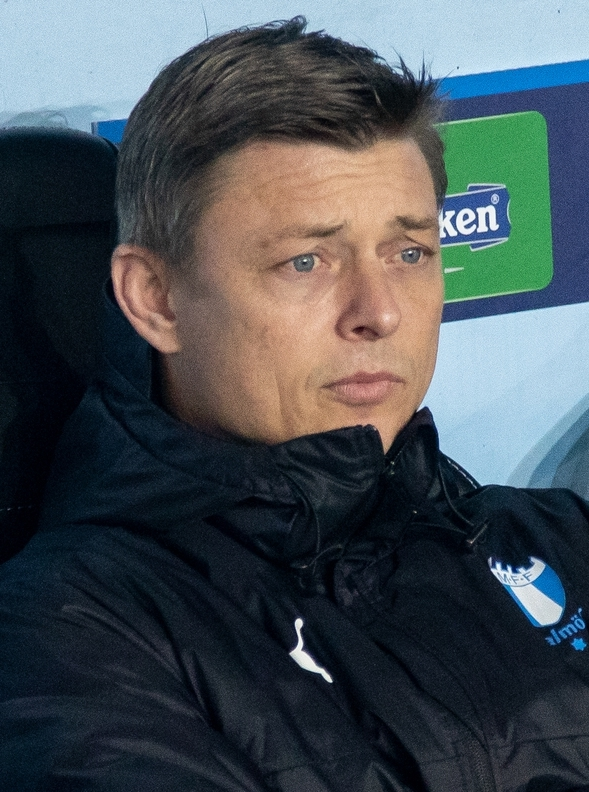
Jon Dahl Tomasson is Feyenoord's most capped non-Dutchman and scored more senior international goals whilst playing for Feyenoord than any other player.

Feyenoord, a Dutch professional association football club based in Rotterdam, was founded in 1908 and has played in the top tier of the Dutch football league system since 1921, winning sixteen Dutch football championships. Players of the club can be called up to represent their national team; as per 18 November 2026, 204 players have played at senior international level whilst playing for Feyenoord, representing 46 nations.

115 of Feyenoord's 204 internationals have represented the Netherlands. The Netherlands' Wim Jansen won 65 caps whilst playing for Feyenoord, more than any other player. Denmark's Jon Dahl Tomasson scored 19 senior international goals whilst playing for Feyenoord, more than any other player, overtaking Hungary's József Kiprich in 2002. Feyenoord's most capped non-European is Karim El Ahmadi, who won 46 caps for Morocco whilst playing for Feyenoord. The most recently new capped player is Kevin Khan, who played his first game for Canada since joining Feyenoord in November 2026.

49 individual Feyenoord players have been in their countries' squads at the FIFA World Cup. Puck van Heel was the first Feyenoord player to represent his nation at the FIFA World Cup, captaining the Netherlands at the 1934 tournament. Ove Kindvall became the first non-Dutchman to do so, playing for Sweden at the 1970 tournament, and Shinji Ono became the first non-European to do so, playing for Japan at the 2002 tournament. No player won the FIFA World Cup whilst playing for Feyenoord, but five Feyenoord players have won a major tournament with their country; Joop Hiele and Sjaak Troost won UEFA Euro 1988 with the Netherlands, the Africa Cup of Nations was won by Hossam Ghaly with Tunisia in 2004 and by Oussama Targhalline with Morocco in 2025, and Santiago Giménez won the 2023 CONCACAF Gold Cup with Mexico.

== List of international players ==
As of 18 November 2026

This is a list of players, past and present, who have been capped for the senior side of their country in international football whilst playing for Feyenoord, excluding matches played during loans out from Feyenoord. Players in bold currently play for Feyenoord.

=== 10+ caps ===
The following players won at least ten caps for the senior side of their country in international football whilst playing for Feyenoord.

- GK = Goalkeeper
- DF = Defender
- MF = Midfielder
- FW = Forward

Player	Country	Position	Caps	Goals	Feyenoord years	International years	Ref.
Karim El Ahmadi	Morocco	MF	46	1	2008–2012; 2014–2018	2008–2019	
Patrick Allotey	Ghana	DF	15	0	1996–2001	1996–1999	
Steven Berghuis	Netherlands	FW	25	2	2016–2021	2016–2023	
**Jordan Bos**	Australia	DF	12	3	2025–	2023–	
Paul Bosvelt	Netherlands	MF	18	0	1997–2003	2000–2004	
Ali Boussaboun	Morocco	FW	10	0	2005–2007	2005–2006	
Giovanni van Bronckhorst	Netherlands	DF	43	2	1993–1998; 2007–2010	1996–2010	
Thomas Buffel	Belgium	MF	18	4	2002–2005	2002–2013	
Romeo Castelen	Netherlands	FW	10	1	2004–2007	2004–2007	
Jordy Clasie	Netherlands	MF	12	0	2010–2015	2012–2016	
**Gaoussou Diarra**	Mali	FW	14	3	2025–	2025–	
Jerzy Dudek	Poland	GK	16	0	1996–2001	2007–2011	
Brett Emerton	Australia	MF	11	5	2000–2003	1998–2012	
Lutsharel Geertruida	Netherlands	DF	11	0	2017–2024	2023–	
Cor van der Gijp	Netherlands	FW	10	5	1955–1964	1954–1961	
Santiago Giménez	Mexico	FW	25	2	2022–2025	2021–	
Ed de Goey	Netherlands	GK	31	0	1990–1997	1992–2000	
Eddy Pieters Graafland	Netherlands	GK	43	0	1958–1970	1957–1967	
Ruud Gullit	Netherlands	MF	15	5	1982–1985	1981–1994	
**Anis Hadj Moussa**	Algeria	FW	18	3	2024–	2024–	
Dávid Hancko	Slovakia	DF	30	5	2022–2025	2018–	
Willem van Hanegem	Netherlands	MF	44	5	1968–1976; 1981–1983	1968–1979	
Franz Hasil	Austria	MF	10	1	1969–1973	1963–1974	
Puck van Heel	Netherlands	MF	64	0	1923–1940	1925–1938	
Hwang In-beom	South Korea	MF	16	1	2024–2026	2018–	
Rinus Israël	Netherlands	DF	38	3	1966–1974	1964–1974	
Alireza Jahanbakhsh	Iran	FW	31	9	2021–2024	2013–	
Daryl Janmaat	Netherlands	DF	21	0	2012–2014	2012–2018	
Wim Jansen	Netherlands	MF	65	1	1965–1980	1967–1980	
Theo de Jong	Netherlands	MF	14	3	1972–1977	1972–1974	
Nicolai Jørgensen	Denmark	FW	23	6	2016–2021	2011–2019	
Bonaventure Kalou	Ivory Coast	FW	24	6	1997–2003	1998–2006	
Ove Kindvall	Sweden	FW	13	9	1966–1971	1965–1974	
József Kiprich	Hungary	FW	32	17	1989–1995	1984–1995	
Jan Klaassens	Netherlands	MF	17	1	1959–1964	1953–1963	
Orkun Kökçü	Turkey	MF	22	2	2018–2023	2020–	
Bert Konterman	Netherlands	DF	11	0	1998–2000	1999–2000	
Wilhelm Kreuz	Austria	FW	18	3	1974–1978	1969–1981	
Piet Kruiver	Netherlands	FW	12	2	1962–1966	1957–1965	
Dirk Kuyt	Netherlands	FW	23	4	2003–2006; 2015–2017	2004–2014	
Henrik Larsson	Sweden	FW	28	6	1993–1997	1993–2009	
Ondřej Lingr	Czech Republic	MF	12	1	2023–2024	2022–	
Marcos López	Peru	DF	18	0	2022–2025	2018–	
Adri van Male	Netherlands	GK	15	0	1930–1939	1932–1940	
Bruno Martins Indi	Netherlands	DF	22	2	2010–2014	2012–2022	
Jeyland Mitchell	Costa Rica	DF	13	2	2024–2026	2024–	
Coen Moulijn	Netherlands	FW	38	4	1955–1972	1956–1969	
Ivan Nielsen	Denmark	DF	35	0	1979–1986	1980–1989	
Shinji Ono	Japan	MF	24	3	2001–2006	1998–2008	
Bas Paauwe	Netherlands	MF	31	1	1929–1947	1932–1946	
Marcus Holmgren Pedersen	Norway	DF	18	0	2021–2025	2021–	
Pétur Pétursson	Iceland	FW	12	3	1978–1981; 1984–1985	1978–1990	
Wim Rijsbergen	Netherlands	DF	28	1	1971–1978	1974–1978	
Kees Rijvers	Netherlands	MF	14	5	1957–1960	1946–1960	
Tomasz Rząsa	Poland	DF	10	0	1999–2003	1994–2006	
Ioan Sabău	Romania	MF	10	1	1990–1992	1988–2001	
Leo Sauer	Slovakia	FW	10	0	2023–2026	2024–	
Dick Schneider	Netherlands	DF	11	2	1970–1978	1972–1974	
Song Chong-gug	South Korea	MF	12	0	2002–2005	2000–2007	
Renato Tapia	Peru	MF	39	3	2016–2020	2015–	
**Oussama Targhalline**	Morocco	MF	12	0	2025–	2024–	
Gaston Taument	Netherlands	FW	15	2	1988–1997	1992–1996	
Jon Dahl Tomasson	Denmark	FW	51	19	1998–2002; 2008–2011	1997–2010	
Gernot Trauner	Austria	DF	11	1	2021–2026	2018–2026	
Ayase Ueda	Japan	FW	27	17	2023–2026	2019–	
Cor Veldhoen	Netherlands	DF	27	0	1956–1970	1961–1967	
Leen Vente	Netherlands	FW	12	10	1936–1941	1933–1940	
Tonny Vilhena	Netherlands	MF	15	0	2012–2019	2016–2018	
Stefan de Vrij	Netherlands	DF	19	1	2009–2014	2012–	
Peter van Vossen	Netherlands	FW	13	2	1998–2001	1992–2000	
Arie de Vroet	Netherlands	FW	22	0	1938–1950	1938–1949	
**Tsuyoshi Watanabe**	Japan	DF	11	0	2025–	2019–	
Henk Wery	Netherlands	FW	10	1	1968–1974	1967–1973	
Ben Wijnstekers	Netherlands	DF	36	1	1975–1988	1979–1985	
Rob Witschge	Netherlands	MF	27	3	1991–1996	1989–1995	
Ramiz Zerrouki	Algeria	MF	20	2	2023–2026	2021–	

=== 9- caps ===
The following players won less than ten caps for the senior side of their country in international football whilst playing for Feyenoord.

Argentina

- Julio Cruz
- Marcos Senesi

Australia

- Brad Jones
- Dave Mitchell

Belgium

- Geoffrey Claeys
- Pieter Collen
- Bart Goor
- Stein Huysegems
- Philippe Léonard

Bulgaria

- Andrey Zhelyazkov

Canada

- Kevin Khan
- Cyle Larin

Chile

- Jorge Acuña

Colombia

- Luis Sinisterra

Croatia

- Luka Ivanušec

Curaçao

- Cuco Martina

Denmark

- John Eriksen
- Jørgen Kristensen

Egypt

- Sherif Ekramy
- Haytham Farouk
- Hossam Ghaly

Finland

- Joonas Kolkka

Gambia

- Yankuba Minteh

Ghana

- Christian Gyan

Greece

- Angelos Charisteas

Hungary

- Antal Róth

Iceland

- Arnar Gunnlaugsson
- Bjarki Gunnlaugsson

Israel

- Ofir Marciano

Ivory Coast

- Sekou Cissé

Morocco

- Sofyan Amrabat
- Oussama Idrissi

Netherlands

- Aad Bak
- Jaap Barendregt
- Mario Been
- Rinus Bennaars
- Gerard Bergholtz
- Justin Bijlow
- Regi Blinker
- Jean-Paul Boëtius
- Tinus Bosselaar
- Peter Bosz
- Frans Bouwmeester
- Joep Brandes
- Bertus Bul
- Tim de Cler
- Jan van Deinsen
- Kees van Dijke
- Toon Duijnhouwer
- Theo van Duivenbode
- Jan Everse
- Leroy Fer
- Piet Fransen
- Henk Fraser
- Jean-Paul van Gastel
- Ulrich van Gobbel
- Wim Groenendijk
- Henk Groot
- Guus Haak
- Quilindschy Hartman
- Joop van der Heide
- Joop Hiele
- Hans van der Hoek
- André Hoekstra
- Nicky Hofs
- Pierre van Hooijdonk
- Peter Houtman
- Gerrit Hulsman
- Rick Karsdorp
- Gerard Kerkum
- Terence Kongolo
- Adriaan Koonings
- Michel van de Korput
- Hans Kraay
- Reinier Kreijermaat
- Gerard Kuppen
- Denny Landzaat
- Theo Laseroms
- Tyrell Malacia
- Joris Mathijsen
- Miquel Nelom
- Jaap Paauwe
- Patrick Paauwe
- Jan Peters
- Kees Pijl
- Peter Ressel
- Piet Romeijn
- Ruben Schaken
- Henk Schouten
- Piet Steenbergen
- **Sem Steijn**
- Calvin Stengs
- Simon Tahamata
- Guus Til
- Quinten Timber
- Henk Timmer
- Jens Toornstra
- Eddy Treijtel
- Sjaak Troost
- Orlando Trustfull
- **Luciano Valente**
- Michel Valke
- Kenneth Vermeer
- Pierre Vermeulen
- Ron Vlaar
- Manus Vrauwdeunt
- Mats Wieffer
- John de Wolf
- Kees van Wonderen
- **Gjivai Zechiël**

Nigeria

- Cyriel Dessers
- Michael Obiku

Norway

- Roger Albertsen
- Fredrik Aursnes
- Fredrik André Bjørkan
- Harmeet Singh

Poland

- Tomasz Iwan
- **Jakub Moder**
- Marek Saganowski
- Ebi Smolarek
- Włodzimierz Smolarek
- Sebastian Szymański

Republic of Ireland

- David Connolly

Serbia

- Danko Lazović
- Uroš Spajić

Slovakia

- Róbert Boženík
- Stanislav Griga

South Africa

- Kamohelo Mokotjo
- Lee Chun-soo

Suriname

- Ridgeciano Haps

Sweden

- Harry Bild
- Johan Elmander
- John Guidetti
- Sam Larsson
- Alexander Östlund

Togo

- Karim Dermane

Tunisia

- Karim Saïdi

Turkey

- Colin Kazim-Richards

United States

- Cory Gibbs

== Major tournaments ==
As of 18 November 2026

The following lists show the players who were included in squads for major international tournaments whilst playing for Feyenoord.

=== FIFA World Cup ===
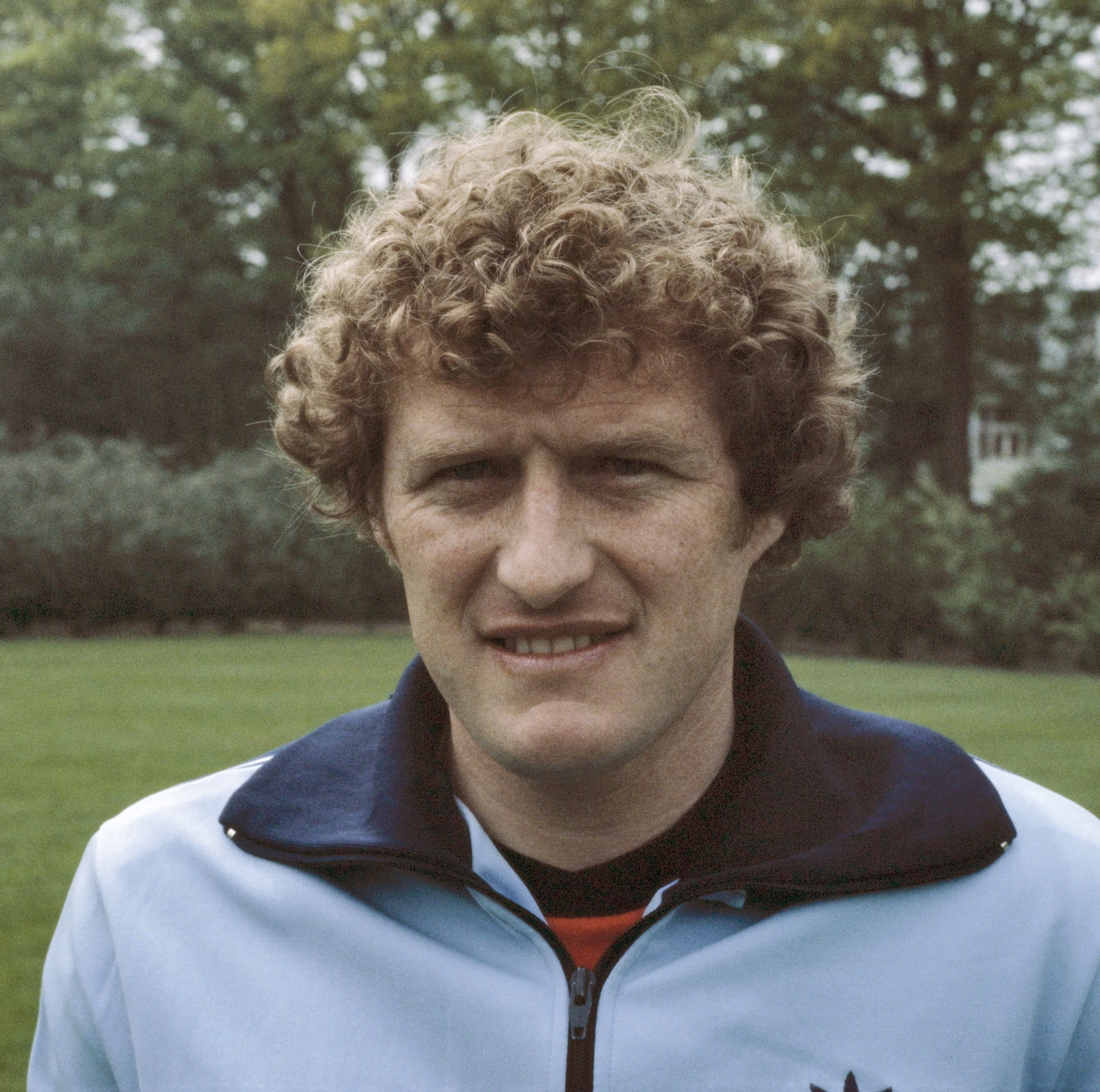
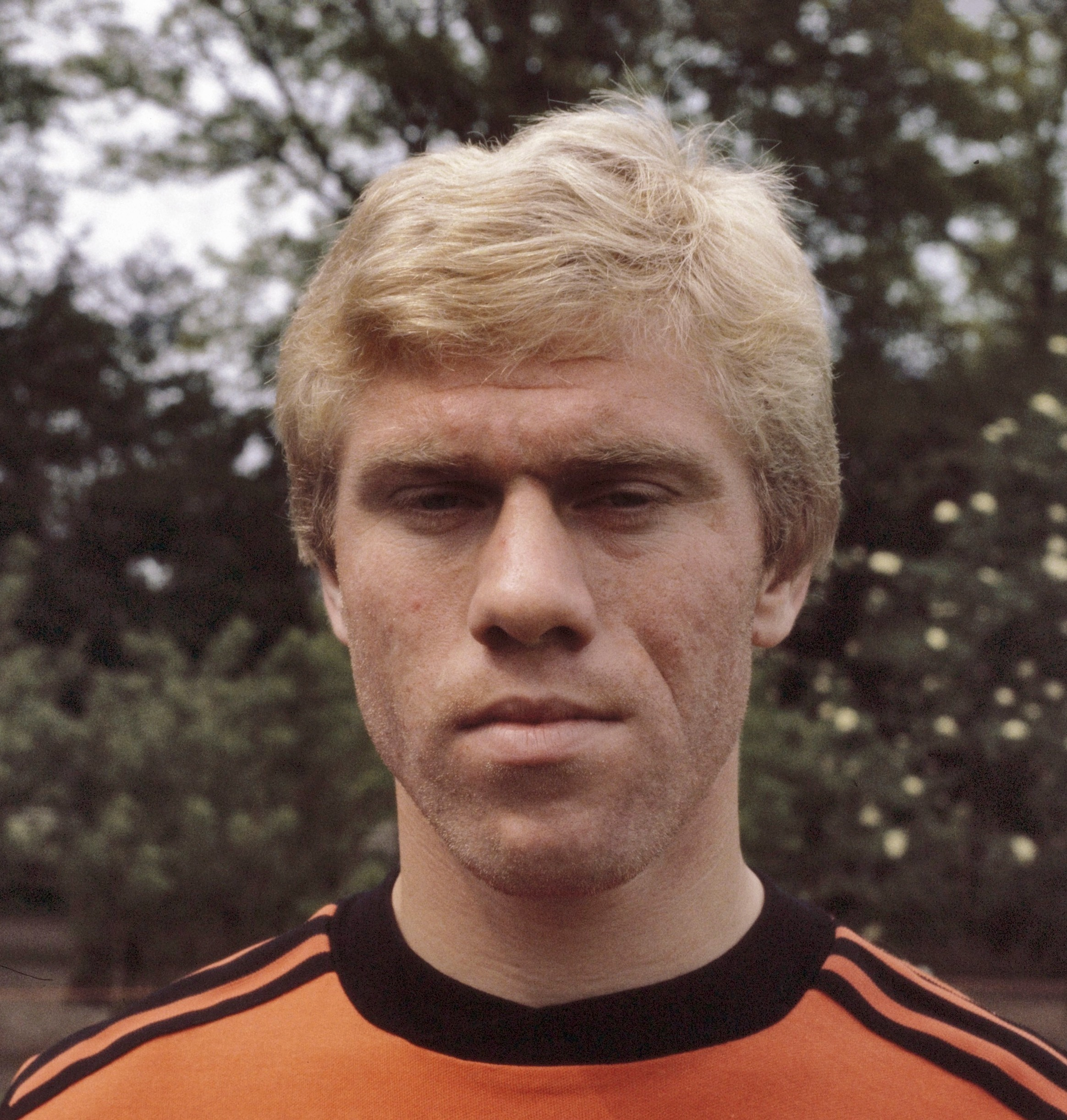
Wim Jansen and Wim Rijsbergen, pictured ahead of the 1978 FIFA World Cup, reached consecutive FIFA World Cup finals with the Netherlands whilst playing for Feyenoord, in 1974 and 1978.

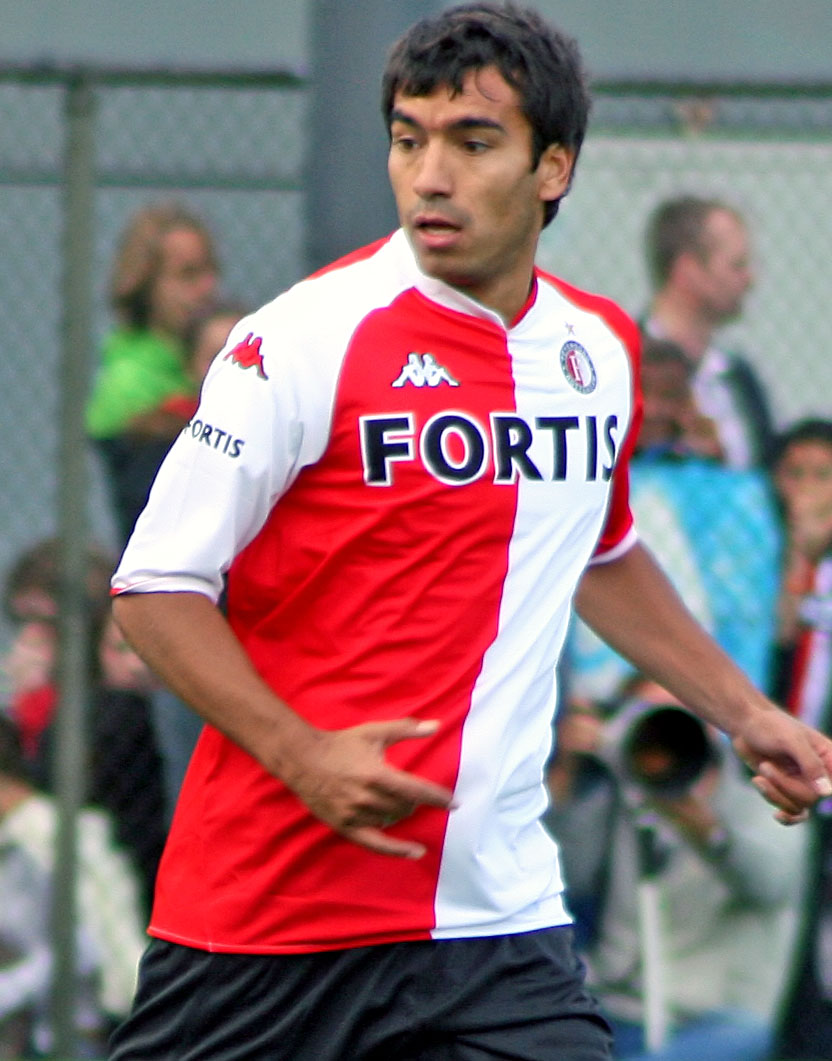
Giovanni van Bronckhorst, pictured playing for Feyenoord in 2007, captained the Netherlands to the 2010 FIFA World Cup final whilst playing for Feyenoord.

Year	Player	Country	Result
1934 (Italy)	Puck van Heel (c)	Netherlands	Round of 16
1934 (Italy)	Adri van Male	Netherlands	Round of 16
1934 (Italy)	Bas Paauwe	Netherlands	Round of 16
1934 (Italy)	Manus Vrauwdeunt	Netherlands	Round of 16
1938 (France)	Puck van Heel (c)	Netherlands	Round of 16
1938 (France)	Adri van Male	Netherlands	Round of 16
1938 (France)	Bas Paauwe	Netherlands	Round of 16
1938 (France)	Leen Vente	Netherlands	Round of 16
1970 (Mexico)	Ove Kindvall	Sweden	3rd in group stage
1974 (West Germany)	Willem van Hanegem	Netherlands	Runner-up
1974 (West Germany)	Rinus Israël	Netherlands	Runner-up
1974 (West Germany)	Wim Jansen	Netherlands	Runner-up
1974 (West Germany)	Theo de Jong	Netherlands	Runner-up
1974 (West Germany)	Wim Rijsbergen	Netherlands	Runner-up
1974 (West Germany)	Eddy Treijtel	Netherlands	Runner-up
1974 (West Germany)	Harry Vos	Netherlands	Runner-up
1978 (Argentina)	Wim Jansen	Netherlands	Runner-up
1978 (Argentina)	Wim Rijsbergen	Netherlands	Runner-up
1978 (Argentina)	Wilhelm Kreuz	Austria	4th in second group stage
1986 (Mexico)	John Eriksen	Denmark	Round of 16
1986 (Mexico)	Ivan Nielsen	Denmark	Round of 16
1990 (Italy)	Stanislav Griga	Czechoslovakia	Quarter-finals
1990 (Italy)	Joop Hiele	Netherlands	Round of 16
1994 (United States)	Henrik Larsson	Sweden	Third
1994 (United States)	Ed de Goey	Netherlands	Quarter-finals
1994 (United States)	Ulrich van Gobbel	Netherlands	Quarter-finals
1994 (United States)	Gaston Taument	Netherlands	Quarter-finals
1994 (United States)	Rob Witschge	Netherlands	Quarter-finals
1994 (United States)	John de Wolf	Netherlands	Quarter-finals
1998 (France)	Giovanni van Bronckhorst	Netherlands	Fourth
2002 (South Korea) (Japan)	Jon Dahl Tomasson	Denmark	Round of 16
2002 (South Korea) (Japan)	Shinji Ono	Japan	Round of 16
2002 (South Korea) (Japan)	Tomasz Rząsa	Poland	4th in group stage
2006 (Germany)	Dirk Kuyt	Netherlands	Round of 16
2006 (Germany)	Karim Saidi (Note: The player was loaned out by Feyenoord at the time the tournament started.)	Tunisia	3rd in group stage
2010 (South Africa)	Giovanni van Bronckhorst (c)	Netherlands	Runner-up
2010 (South Africa)	Jon Dahl Tomasson (c)	Denmark	3rd in group stage
2014 (Brazil)	Jordy Clasie	Netherlands	Third
2014 (Brazil)	Bruno Martins Indi	Netherlands	Third
2014 (Brazil)	Daryl Janmaat	Netherlands	Third
2014 (Brazil)	Terence Kongolo	Netherlands	Third
2014 (Brazil)	Stefan de Vrij	Netherlands	Third
2018 (Russia)	Nicolai Jørgensen	Denmark	Round of 16
2018 (Russia)	Renato Tapia	Peru	3rd in group stage
2018 (Russia)	Brad Jones	Australia	4th in group stage
2018 (Russia)	Karim El Ahmadi	Morocco	4th in group stage
2018 (Russia)	Sofyan Amrabat	Morocco	4th in group stage
2022 (Qatar)	Justin Bijlow	Netherlands	Quarter-finals
2022 (Qatar)	Sebastian Szymański	Poland	Round of 16
2022 (Qatar)	Alireza Jahanbakhsh	Iran	3rd in group stage
2026 (Canada) (Mexico) (United States)	Anis Hadj Moussa	Algeria	Round of 32
2026 (Canada) (Mexico) (United States)	Ramiz Zerrouki	Algeria	Round of 32
2026 (Canada) (Mexico) (United States)	Jordan Bos	Australia	Round of 32
2026 (Canada) (Mexico) (United States)	Ayase Ueda	Japan	Round of 32
2026 (Canada) (Mexico) (United States)	Tsuyoshi Watanabe	Japan	Round of 32
2026 (Canada) (Mexico) (United States)	Hwang In-beom	South Korea	3rd in group stage

=== FIFA Confederations Cup ===
Year	Player	Country	Result
2001 (South Korea) (Japan)	Brett Emerton	Australia	Third
2005 (Germany)	Karim Saidi	Tunisia	3rd in group stage

=== UEFA European Championship ===
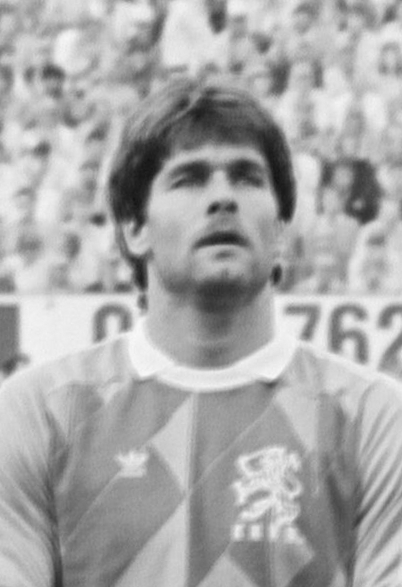
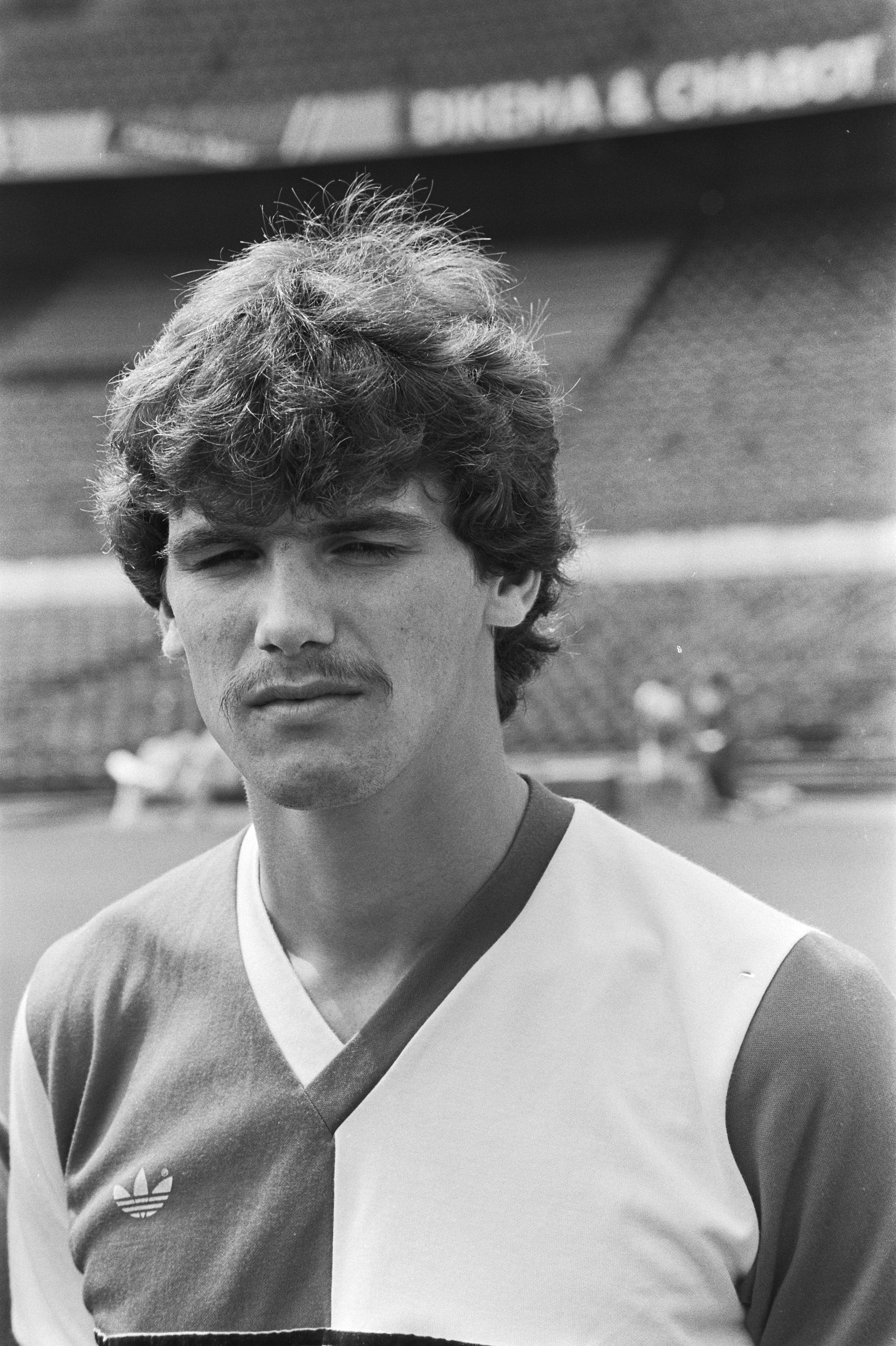
Joop Hiele, pictured playing for the Netherlands in 1987, and Sjaak Troost, pictured in a Feyenoord shirt in 1982, were in the Netherlands squad that won UEFA Euro 1988, although both players did not appear at the final tournament.

Year	Player	Country	Result
1976 (Socialist Federal Republic of Yugoslavia)	Willem van Hanegem	Netherlands	Third
1976 (Socialist Federal Republic of Yugoslavia)	Wim Jansen	Netherlands	Third
1976 (Socialist Federal Republic of Yugoslavia)	Wim Rijsbergen	Netherlands	Third
1980 (Italy)	Michel van de Korput	Netherlands	3rd in group stage
1980 (Italy)	Ben Wijnstekers	Netherlands	3rd in group stage
1984 (France)	Ivan Nielsen	Denmark	Semi-finals
1988 (West Germany)	Joop Hiele	Netherlands	Winner
1988 (West Germany)	Sjaak Troost	Netherlands	Winner
1992 (Sweden)	Peter Bosz	Netherlands	Semi-finals
1992 (Sweden)	Rob Witschge	Netherlands	Semi-finals
1996 (England)	Ed de Goey	Netherlands	Quarter-finals
1996 (England)	Gaston Taument	Netherlands	Quarter-finals
2000 (Netherlands) (Belgium)	Paul Bosvelt	Netherlands	Semi-finals
2000 (Netherlands) (Belgium)	Bert Konterman	Netherlands	Semi-finals
2000 (Netherlands) (Belgium)	Peter van Vossen	Netherlands	Semi-finals
2000 (Netherlands) (Belgium)	Jon Dahl Tomasson	Denmark	4th in group stage
2008 (Austria) (Switzerland)	Giovanni van Bronckhorst	Netherlands	Quarter-finals
2008 (Austria) (Switzerland)	Tim de Cler	Netherlands	Quarter-finals
2008 (Austria) (Switzerland)	Henk Timmer	Netherlands	Quarter-finals
2012 (Poland) (Ukraine)	Ron Vlaar	Netherlands	4th in group stage
2021	Steven Berghuis	Netherlands	Round of 16
2021	Róbert Boženík	Slovakia	3rd in group stage
2021	Orkun Kökçü	Turkey	4th in group stage
2024 (Germany)	Justin Bijlow	Netherlands	Semi-finals
2024 (Germany)	Lutsharel Geertruida	Netherlands	Semi-finals
2024 (Germany)	Gernot Trauner	Austria	Round of 16
2024 (Germany)	Dávid Hancko	Slovakia	Round of 16
2024 (Germany)	Leo Sauer	Slovakia	Round of 16
2024 (Germany)	Luka Ivanušec	Croatia	3rd in group stage
2024 (Germany)	Ondřej Lingr	Czech Republic	4th in group stage

=== Copa América ===
Year	Player	Country	Result
2016 (United States)	Renato Tapia	Peru	Quarter-finals
2019 (Brazil)	Renato Tapia	Peru	Runner-up
2024 (United States)	Santiago Giménez	Mexico	3rd in group stage
2024 (United States)	Marcos López	Peru	4th in group stage

=== Africa Cup of Nations ===
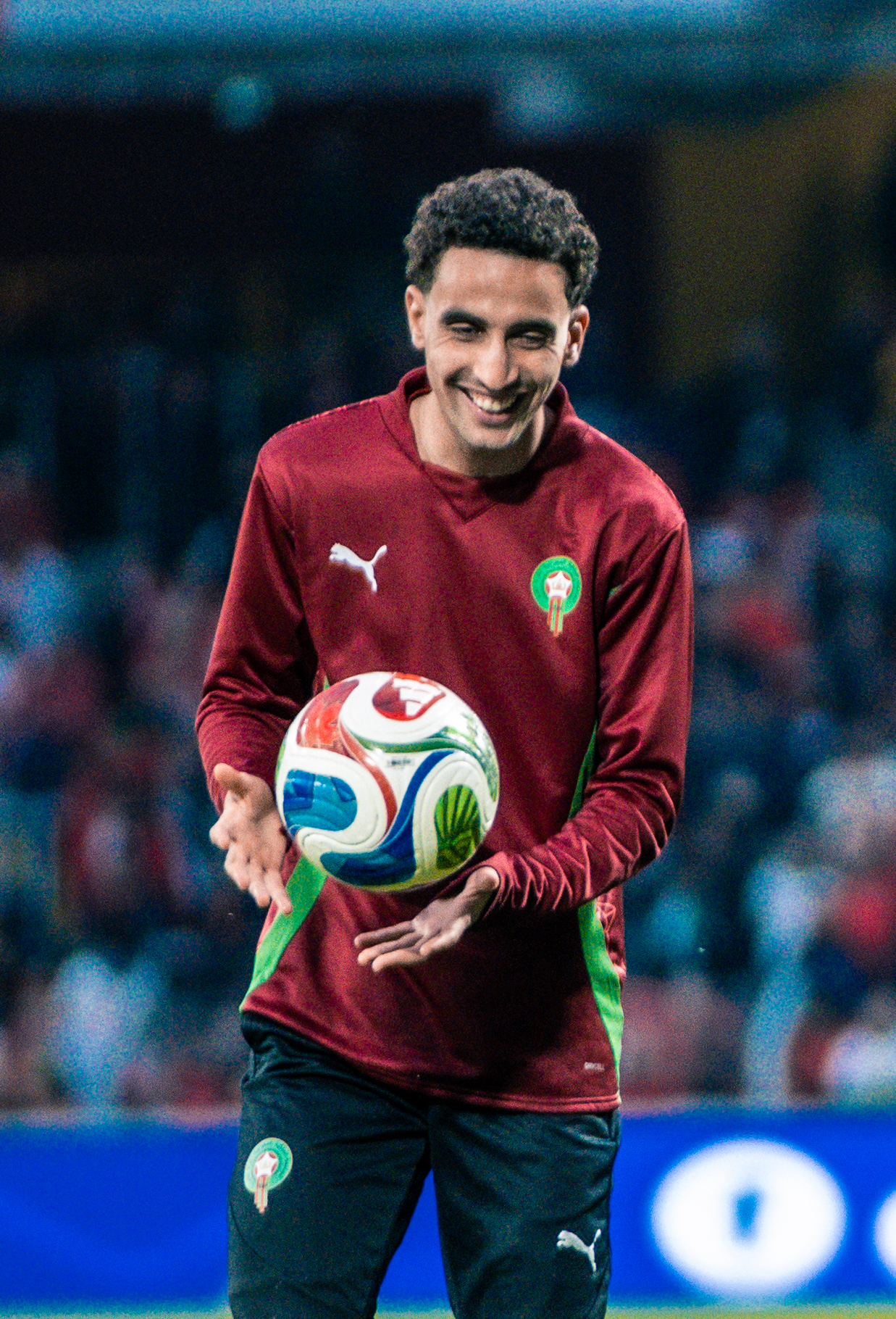
Oussama Targhalline, pictured with Morocco in 2026, won the tournament in 2025.

Year	Player	Country	Result
1994 (Tunisia)	Bulayima Mukuayanzo	Zaire	Quarter-finals
1998 (Burkina Faso)	Bonaventure Kalou	Ivory Coast	Quarter-finals
1998 (Burkina Faso)	Patrick Allotey	Ghana	3rd in group stage
2000 (Ghana) (Nigeria)	Christian Gyan	Ghana	Quarter-finals
2000 (Ghana) (Nigeria)	Bonaventure Kalou	Ivory Coast	3rd in group stage
2002 (Mali)	Bonaventure Kalou	Ivory Coast	Quarter-finals
2004 (Tunisia)	Hossam Ghaly	Tunisia	Winner
2006 (Egypt)	Ali Boussaboun	Morocco	3rd in group stage
2012 (Gabon) (Equatorial Guinea)	Karim El Ahmadi	Morocco	3rd in group stage
2017 (Gabon)	Karim El Ahmadi	Morocco	Quarter-finals
2024 (Ivory Coast)	Ramiz Zerrouki	Algeria	4th in group stage
2024 (Ivory Coast)	Yankuba Minteh	Gambia	4th in group stage
2025 (Morocco)	Oussama Targhalline	Morocco	Winner
2025 (Morocco)	Anis Hadj Moussa	Algeria	Quarter-finals
2025 (Morocco)	Gaoussou Diarra	Mali	Quarter-finals

=== AFC Asian Cup ===
Year	Player	Country	Result
2024 (Qatar)	Alireza Jahanbakhsh	Iran	Semi-finals
2024 (Qatar)	Ayase Ueda	Japan	Quarter-finals

=== CONCACAF Gold Cup ===
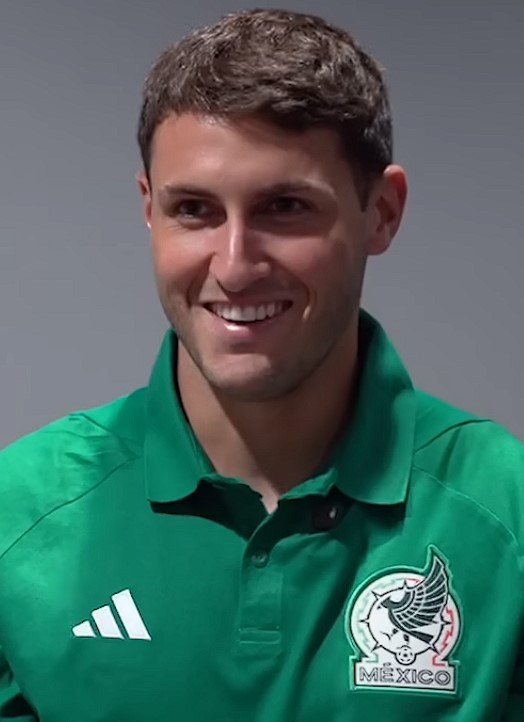
Santiago Giménez, pictured in 2023, scored the winning goal for Mexico in the 2023 CONCACAF Gold Cup final whilst playing for Feyenoord.

Year	Player	Country	Result
2019 (Costa Rica) (Jamaica) (United States)	Cuco Martina (c)	Curaçao	Quarter-finals
2021 (United States)	Ridgeciano Haps	Suriname	3rd in group stage
2023 (United States)	Santiago Giménez	Mexico	Winner
2025 (United States) (Canada)	Jeyland Mitchell	Costa Rica	Quarter-finals

=== UEFA Nations League Finals ===
Year	Player	Country	Result
2019 (Portugal)	Kenneth Vermeer	Netherlands	Runner-up
2019 (Portugal)	Tonny Vilhena	Netherlands	Runner-up
2023 (Netherlands)	Justin Bijlow	Netherlands	Fourth
2023 (Netherlands)	Lutsharel Geertruida	Netherlands	Fourth
2023 (Netherlands)	Mats Wieffer	Netherlands	Fourth

=== CONCACAF Nations League Finals ===
Year	Player	Country	Result
2023 (United States)	Santiago Giménez	Mexico	Third
2024 (United States)	Santiago Giménez	Mexico	Runner-up
