= Puck van Heel =

Dutch footballer (1904–1984)

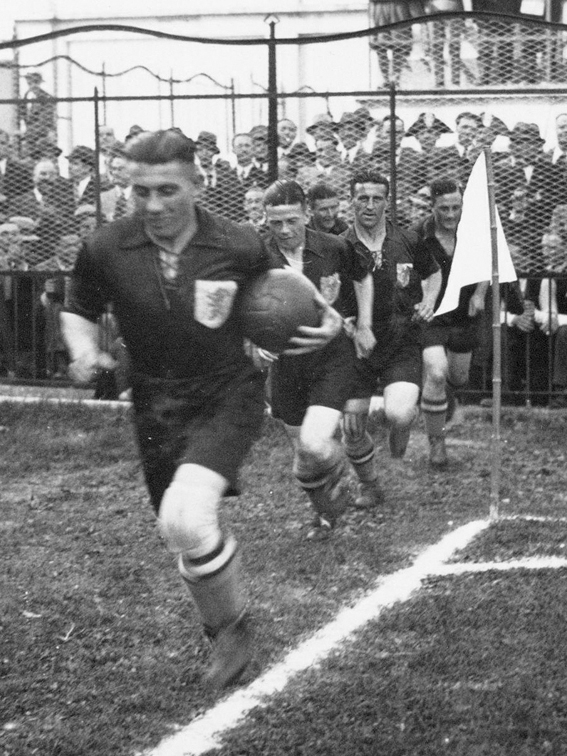
- Van Heel (front) playing for the Netherlands national football team in the 1934 World Cup.

Personal information
- Full name: Gerardus Henricus van Heel
- Date of birth: 21 January 1904
- Place of birth: Rotterdam, Netherlands
- Date of death: 19 December 1984 (aged 80)
- Place of death: Rotterdam, Netherlands
- Position: Midfielder

Youth career
- 1919–1923: Feijenoord

Senior career*
Years	Team	Apps	(Gls)
1923–1940	Feijenoord	322	(43)

International career
1925–1938	Netherlands	64	(0)

Managerial career
- 1941–1944: Fortuna Vlaardingen
- * Club domestic league appearances and goals

Gerardus Henricus "Puck" van Heel (21 January 1904 – 19 December 1984) was a Dutch footballer. He earned 64 caps for the Netherlands national football team, and played in the 1934 and 1938 FIFA World Cups. He also represented the Netherlands at the 1928 Summer Olympics. During his club career, he played for his home town club of Feyenoord. Normally an inside left or left wing half, Van Heel was a slow player but possessed considerable vision and technical ability and was particularly good passer.

He held the Dutch caps record from 4 April 1937 (when he equaled the total of Harry Dénis) until 22 May 1979 (when his total was surpassed by Ruud Krol).

Van Heel was born on the southside of Rotterdam, the fourth of eleven children, into a Roman Catholic family. His father worked in the shipyards of Rotterdam. He was nicknamed Puck due to his small stature and joined the amateur club Sportclub Feyenoord, a youth academy for Feyenoord Rotterdam, and made his amateur debut in the red and white on 12 October 1919.

== Club career ==
Van Heel was a cornerstone of the Feijenoord success preceding World War II, winning five national titles and two KNVB Cups. During his time there, he became the team captain and a figurehead for the club. He was also one of the 11 Feyenoord players, (Adri van Male, Pleun de Groot, Joop van der Heide, Bas Paauwe, Gerard Kuppen, van Heel, Jan Linssen, Piet Smits, Manus Vrauwdeunt, Leen Vente, Piet Kantebeen) chosen to play at the inauguration of their new stadium on 27 March 1937. The stadium was christened Feijenoord Stadion but would become known as "De Kuip". The game was against Belgian side Beerschot and watched by 37,825 spectators. Feijenoord were runaway victors with a final scoreline of 5–2.

== International career ==
Van Heel earned his first international cap at 21 years of age, on 19 April 1925. He would be part of the Dutch team for the next 13 years, until his retirement from international duty on 23 October 1938. His final game, a 2–2 draw with Denmark, would be his 64th cap for the Dutch national side. He equaled Harry Dénis's record of 56 caps on 4 April 1937 and would earn his 57th on 2 May 1937, both of these games were against Belgium. He would remain the most capped Dutch player until 1979 when Ruud Krol would exceed his total.

Van Heel played at the 1934 and 1938 FIFA World Cups under English manager Bob Glendenning.

== Personal life ==
Van Heel was born to Marcelis van Heel and Gerardina Vos and he married Marie Schellekens on 2 August 1933. They did not have any children. After retiring as a player, van Heel owned a bar in Rotterdam until 1969. He also coached amateur sides Fortuna Vlaardingen, OVV, SSS and Flakkee.

He was appointed an honorary member of Feijenoord in 1935 and the KNVB (Dutch FA) named him a Knight of the Association in 1964. The city of Rotterdam awarded him the Wolfert van Borselen Medal on his 75th birthday in 1979. His wife Marie died in 1978 which depressed van Heel and he passed away in 1984.

== Career honours ==
=== Club ===
Feyenoord

- Eredivisie: 1923–24, 1927–28, 1935–36, 1937–38, 1939–40; runner-up: 1930-31, 1931–32, 1932–33, 1936–37
- KNVB Cup: 1930, 1935; runner-up: 1934
