= Piet Vrauwdeunt =

Dutch professional footballer (1944–1987)

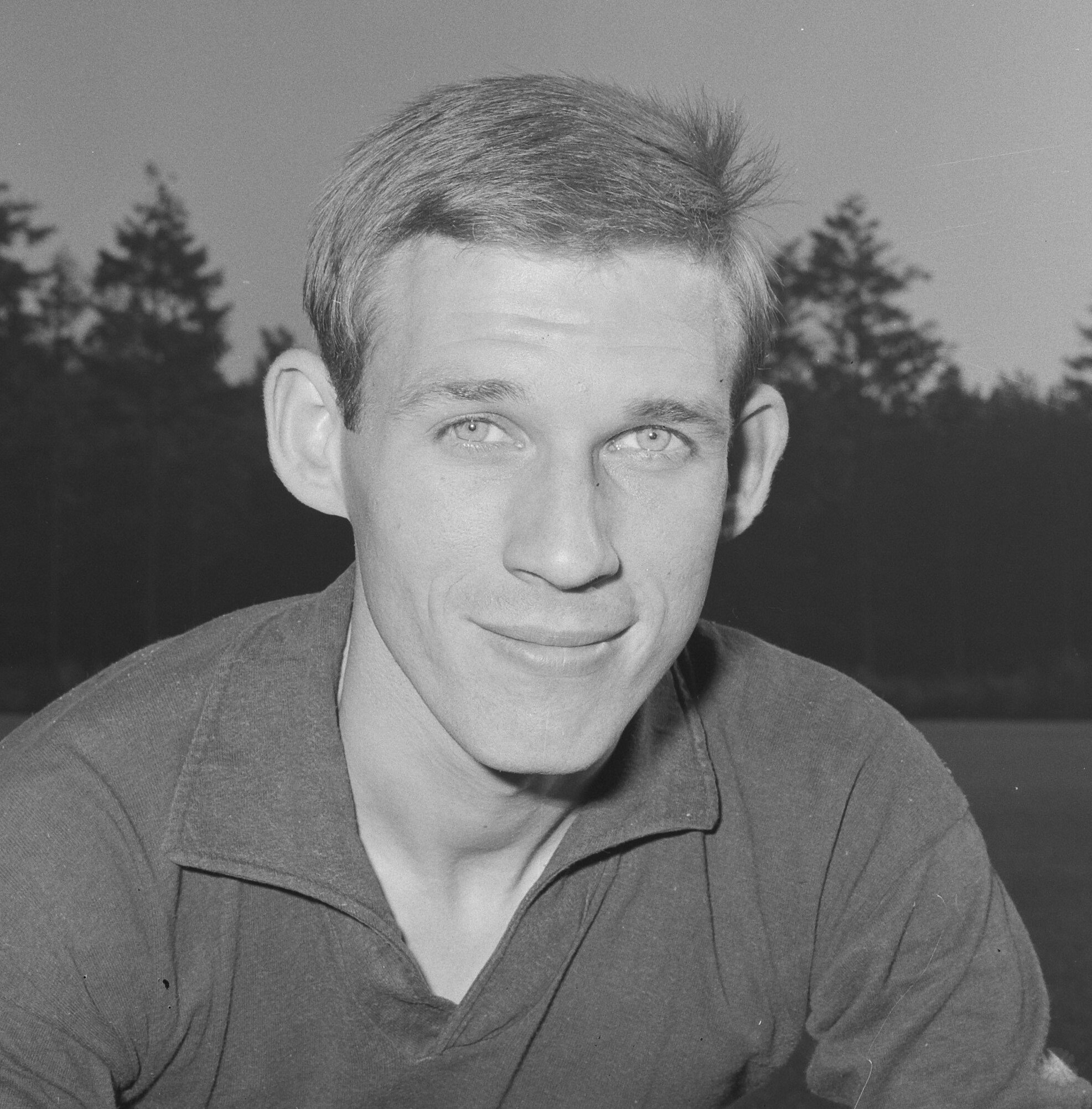
- Vrauwdeunt with Feyenoord in 1965

Personal information
- Full name: Pieter Willem Vrauwdeunt
- Date of birth: 1 January 1944
- Place of birth: Rotterdam, Netherlands
- Date of death: 2 January 1987 (aged 43)
- Place of death: Rotterdam, Netherlands
- Position: Midfielder

Youth career
- 1963–1964: Feyenoord

Senior career*
Years	Team	Apps	(Gls)
1964–1966	Feyenoord	11	(2)
1966–1969	Dordrecht		
1969–1970	Feyenoord	8	(3)
1970–1972	DWS	55	(8)
1972–1973	AFC		
Total		74+	(13+)
- * Club domestic league appearances and goals

Pieter "Piet" Willem Vrauwdeunt (1 January 1944–2 January 1987) was a Dutch professional footballer, who played as a midfielder.

== Career ==
Vrauwdeunt was the son of Dutch professional footballer Manus Vrauwdeunt, who also played for Feyenoord. Vrauwdeunt was part of the Feyenoord team that won the European Cup in 1970, however, he only played in a quarter-final match against Vorwärts Berlin. Vrauwdeunt passed away on 2 January 1987, at Sint Clara Ziekenhuis in Rotterdam.

== Honours ==
Feyenoord

- Eredivisie: 1964–65
- European Cup: 1969–70
