= Bertus Bul =

Dutch footballer

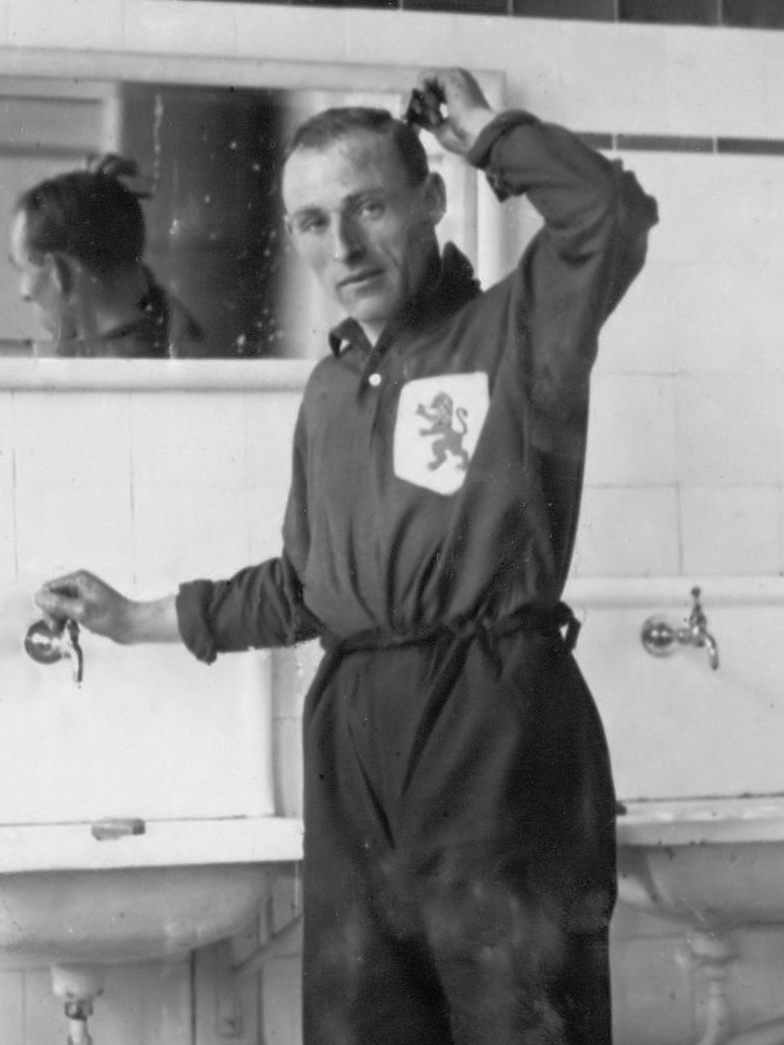

Personal information
- Date of birth: 16 May 1897
- Place of birth: Rotterdam, Netherlands
- Date of death: 4 October 1972 (aged 75)
- Position: Defender

Youth career
- Transvalia

Senior career*
Years	Team	Apps	(Gls)
1917–1930	Feijenoord	187	(12)

International career
1923–1926	Netherlands	6	(0)
- * Club domestic league appearances and goals

Bertus Bul (16 May 1897 – 4 October 1972) was a Dutch footballer. He played in six matches for the Netherlands national football team from 1923 to 1926.

Bul was the second Feijenoord player who made it to the national team, behind Gerrit Hulsman.

A mural in Rotterdam was unveiled in 2021, dedicated to Bul and Puck van Heel.
