= Patrick Allotey =

Ghanaian footballer (1978–2007)

Personal information
- Full name: Patrick Allotey
- Date of birth: 13 December 1978
- Place of birth: Accra, Ghana
- Date of death: 27 June 2007 (aged 28)
- Place of death: Accra, Ghana
- Height: 1.75 m (5 ft 9 in)
- Position: Defender

Senior career*
Years	Team	Apps	(Gls)
1996–2001	Feyenoord	5	(0)
1997–1998	→ Excelsior (loan)	7	(0)

International career
1996–1999	Ghana	15	(0)
- * Club domestic league appearances and goals

Patrick Allotey (13 December 1978 – 27 June 2007) was a football defender from Ghana.

== Career ==
Born in Accra, Allotey played five official matches for Dutch giants Feyenoord. He also served Excelsior Rotterdam.

Even though Allotey only played a few matches for Feyenoord, he is part of their history in the 1990s and 2000s as he was one of the main persons in the FIOD-affaire at Feyenoord. In 1998 the Fiscal Intelligence and Investigation Service (FIOD) visited Feyenoord because of suspected fraud. Mainly based on the signings of Aurelio Vidmar, Christian Gyan and Allotey. This became an ongoing scandal in the years to come with chairman Jorien van den Herik as the main suspect. Eventually in 2006 both Feyenoord and Van den Herik were cleared of any charges.

== Death ==
Allotey died in Accra, Ghana on June 27, 2007. It was said he was suffering from headaches, collapsed while with friends and was taken to hospital. The player was said to be suffering from hypoglycemia, a condition caused by low blood sugar level. For this reason, he had been inactive as far as football was concerned, until his death.

== International ==
Feyenoord scouted Allotey at the 1995 FIFA Under-17 World Championships in Ecuador where Ghana became World Champions. He featured in a team with players like Awudu Issaka, Stephen Appiah and Emanuel Bentil. He was one of the best left-footed footballers Ghana ever produced. Although he was a defender, his surging runs on the flanks made him one of the most sought-after players subsequent to the Ecuador 1995 World under-17 championship.
