= Henryk Bolesta =

Polish Footballer

Personal information
- Date of birth: 20 September 1957 (age 69)
- Place of birth: Radom, Poland
- Height: 1.87 m (6 ft 2 in)
- Position: Goalkeeper

Senior career*
Years	Team	Apps	(Gls)
–1973	Radomiak Radom		
1973–1974	Star Starachowice		
1974–1975	Radomiak Radom		
1975–1982	Ruch Chorzów	101	(0)
1982–1989	Widzew Łódź	133	(0)
1989	Feyenoord	7	(0)
1989–1993	Roda JC	82	(0)

International career
1986	Poland	1	(0)
- * Club domestic league appearances and goals

Henryk Bolesta (born 20 September 1957) is a Polish former professional footballer who played as a goalkeeper.

== Honours ==
Ruch Chorzów

- Ekstraklasa: 1974–75, 1978–79

Widzew Łódź

- Polish Cup: 1984–85
