= Zier Tebbenhoff =

Dutch footballer

Personal information
- Date of birth: February 1, 1972 (age 54)
- Place of birth: The Hague, Netherlands
- Position: Forward

Senior career*
Years	Team	Apps	(Gls)
-1989/90	Feyenoord	21	(2)
1989/90-1991	SV SVV	13+	(3+)
1991-1992	FC Dordrecht	12	(2)
1992-1995	ADO Den Haag		
- * Club domestic league appearances and goals

Zier Tebbenhoff (born 1 February 1972 in The Hague) is a Dutch retired footballer.

== Career ==
In 1995, Tebbenhoff was released by ADO Den Haag due to financial problems and was replaced by amateur players. After not being able to find a team to join for 6 months, he said "Everyone around me asks me why I don't play at a club. I don't understand myself either. I know what I can do, but I'm on my own. I have to keep myself sharp through running training and competitions at an amateur club from The Hague. I am used to the highest, then this is very disappointing".
