= Adriaan Koonings =

Dutch footballer and manager

Personal information
- Full name: Adriaan Koonings
- Date of birth: 23 December 1895
- Place of birth: Rotterdam, Netherlands
- Date of death: 18 April 1963 (aged 67)
- Place of death: Rotterdam, Netherlands
- Position: Striker

Youth career
- Feijenoord

Senior career*
Years	Team	Apps	(Gls)
1915–1930	Feijenoord	183	(100)

International career^{‡}
1924–1924	Netherlands	1	(0)

Managerial career
- 1946–1950: Feijenoord
- * Club domestic league appearances and goals as of 9 June 2007 ‡ National team caps and goals as of 9 June 2007

Adriaan Koonings (23 December 1895 – 18 April 1963), was a Dutch footballer who was active as a striker.

Koonings was born in Rotterdam and played his whole career at Feijenoord. He won one cap for the Netherlands. After his playing career he managed Feijenoord from 1946 to 1950, and he died in Rotterdam.

== Honours ==
- 1923-24 : Eredivisie winner with Feijenoord
- 1927-28 : Eredivisie winner with Feijenoord
- 1929-30 : KNVB Cup winner with Feijenoord
