= Jan Klaassens =

Dutch footballer (1931–1983)

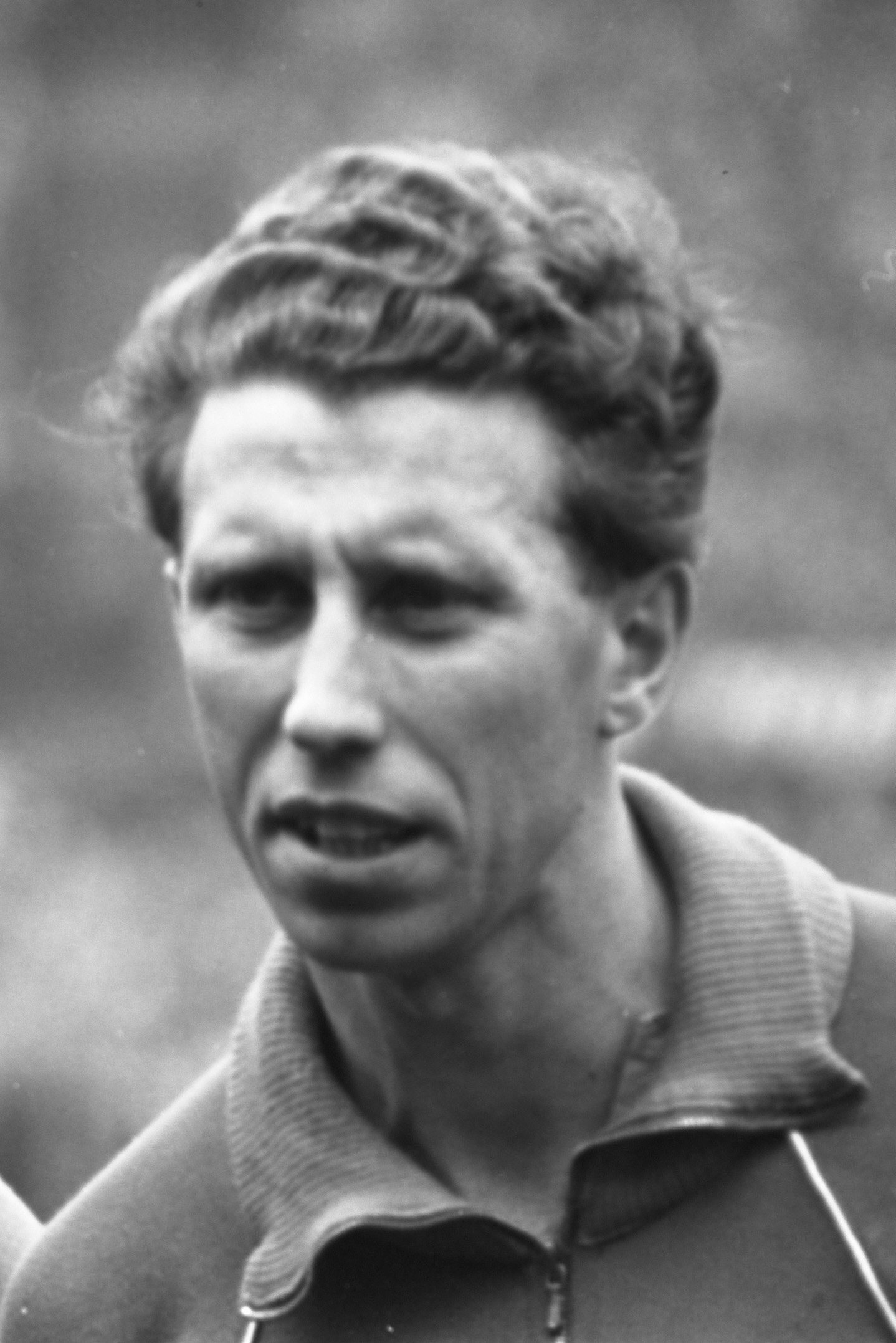

Personal information
- Date of birth: 4 September 1931
- Place of birth: Venlo, Netherlands
- Date of death: 12 February 1983 (aged 51)
- Place of death: Netherlands
- Position: Midfielder

Youth career
- Venlose Boys

Senior career*
Years	Team	Apps	(Gls)
1948–1959	VVV-Venlo		
1959–1964	Feyenoord		
1964–1967	VVV-Venlo		

International career
1953–1963	Netherlands	57	(1)
- * Club domestic league appearances and goals

Jan Klaassens (4 September 1931 – 12 February 1983) was a Dutch football player who played for VVV-Venlo and Feyenoord, as well as the Netherlands national team.
