= Sjaak Troost =

Dutch retired footballer (born 1959)

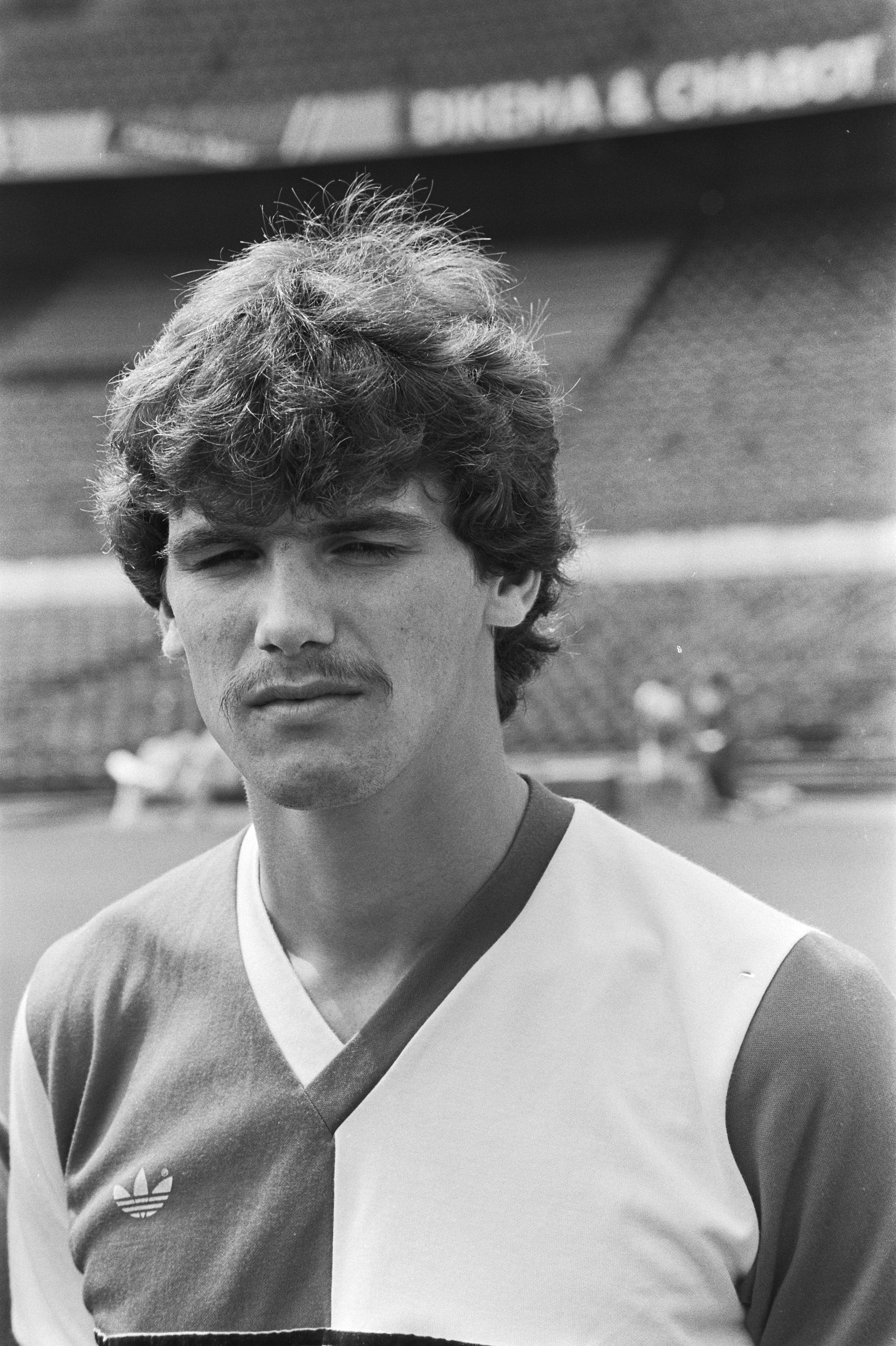
- Troost in 1982

Personal information
- Full name: Jacob Troost
- Date of birth: 28 August 1959 (age 67)
- Place of birth: Pernis, Netherlands
- Height: 1.80 m (5 ft 11 in)
- Position: Defender

Youth career
- DOTO Pernis
- Feyenoord

Senior career*
Years	Team	Apps	(Gls)
1978–1992	Feyenoord	325	(5)

International career
1987–1988	Netherlands	4	(0)
Medal record
Representing Netherlands
UEFA European Championship
Winner	1988 West Germany
- * Club domestic league appearances and goals

Jacob "Sjaak" Troost (born 28 August 1959) is a Dutch former footballer who played as a defender.

== Club career ==
Born in Pernis, South Holland, Troost played his entire career with local Feyenoord, making his Eredivisie debut on 9 April 1978 in a 0–1 away loss against FC Volendam and becoming an undisputed starter from the 1981–82 season onwards. He appeared in 29 games in 1983–84 as the Rotterdam club won the league after a 10-year wait, scoring once in a 4–0 win at Fortuna Sittard as the campaign also ended with Dutch Cup conquest.

Troost appeared in 397 official matches for Feyenoord, retiring in June 1992 at nearly 33. Later on, he became the club's commercial director.

== International career ==
Troost earned four caps for the Dutch national team. His debut came on 9 September 1987 in a 0–0 friendly with Belgium, in front of a familiar crowd at De Kuip (90 minutes played).

Troost was selected for the squad that appeared at UEFA Euro 1988 in West Germany, being an unused squad member for the eventual champions.

== Honours ==
=== Club ===
Feyenoord

- Eredivisie: 1983–84
- KNVB Cup: 1979–80, 1983–84, 1990–91, 1991–92
- Johan Cruijff Shield: 1991

=== International ===
Netherlands

- UEFA European Championship: 1988

== See also ==
- List of one-club men
