= Jan Linssen =

Dutch association football player

Personal information
- Full name: Jan Linssen
- Date of birth: 19 January 1913
- Place of birth: Rotterdam, Netherlands
- Date of death: 2 November 1995 (aged 82)
- Place of death: Rotterdam, Netherlands
- Position: Forward

Youth career
- De Jonge Spartaan
- Feijenoord

Senior career*
Years	Team	Apps	(Gls)
1932–1954	Feijenoord	337	(91)

International career
1938	Netherlands (unofficial)	1	(1)
- * Club domestic league appearances and goals

Jan Linssen (19 January 1913 – 2 November 1995) was a Dutch footballer who was active as a forward. Linssen played his whole career at Feijenoord and is known as the player who has never made a single foul. The only referee that fouled him during a match was Dirk Nijs who did this as a joke and to become the only referee that ever fouled Linssen. Linssen played once for the Netherlands national football team, in 1938 against the Dutch Indies and also scored a goal, however the match was not officially recognized as such.

== Honours ==
- 1935-36 : Eredivisie winner with Feijenoord
- 1937-38 : Eredivisie winner with Feijenoord
- 1939-40 : Eredivisie winner with Feijenoord
