= Aad Bak =

Dutch footballer

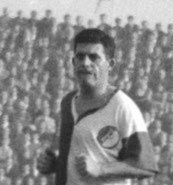

Personal information
- Full name: Adrianus Johannes Bak
- Date of birth: 18 June 1926
- Place of birth: Rotterdam, Netherlands
- Date of death: 16 January 2009 (aged 82)
- Place of death: Schiedam, Netherlands
- Position: Midfielder

Youth career
- Excelsior
- FC Rotterdam

Senior career*
Years	Team	Apps	(Gls)
1954–1955	Holland Sport		
1955–1962	Feijenoord	133	(11)

International career^{‡}
1956	Netherlands	1	(0)
- * Club domestic league appearances and goals as of 4 June 2007 ‡ National team caps and goals as of 4 June 2007

Adrianus ("Aad") Johannes Bak (Rotterdam, South Holland, 18 June 1926 - 16 January 2009 Schiedam, South Holland) was a Dutch professional football player.

== Club career ==
Bak started his career in the team of Excelsior. He played for Holland Sport during the 1954–55 season. Between 1955 and 1962, he played in the midfielder position for Feijenoord. While there, he won two Dutch national championships, in 1961 and 1962.

== International career ==
Bak received his only cap in the Netherlands national football team in 1956.
