= Gerrit Hulsman =

Dutch footballer (1900–1964)

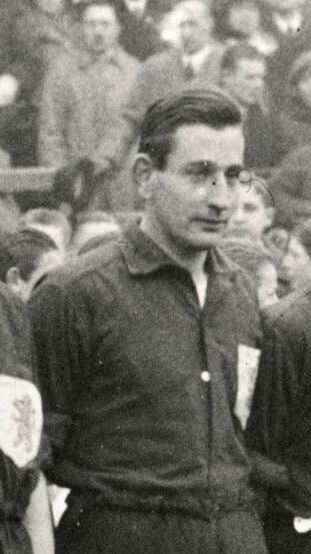
- Hulsman in 1923

Personal information
- Full name: Gerhardus Hendrikus Hulsman
- Date of birth: 18 February 1900
- Place of birth: Deventer, Netherlands
- Date of death: 23 November 1964 (aged 64)
- Place of death: Deventer, Netherlands
- Position: Midfielder

Senior career*
Years	Team	Apps	(Gls)
1918–1921	Go Ahead		
1921–1922	Feijenoord	20	(2)
1922–1929	Go Ahead		

International career
1921–1923	Netherlands	4	(0)
- * Club domestic league appearances and goals

Gerrit Hulsman (18 February 1900 – 23 November 1964) was a Dutch footballer who played as a midfielder. He played in four matches for the Netherlands national football team from 1921 to 1923.

Nicknamed De Neuze (The Nose), Hulsman made his senior debut in 1918 for hometown club Go Ahead, who were one of the Netherland's best clubs at the time. As football was fully amateur in those days, he then controversially moved to Rotterdam citing he found a new job there, and had a one year spell at Feijenoord. Subsequently he became their first Oranje player.
