= Guus Haak =

Dutch footballer (born 1937)

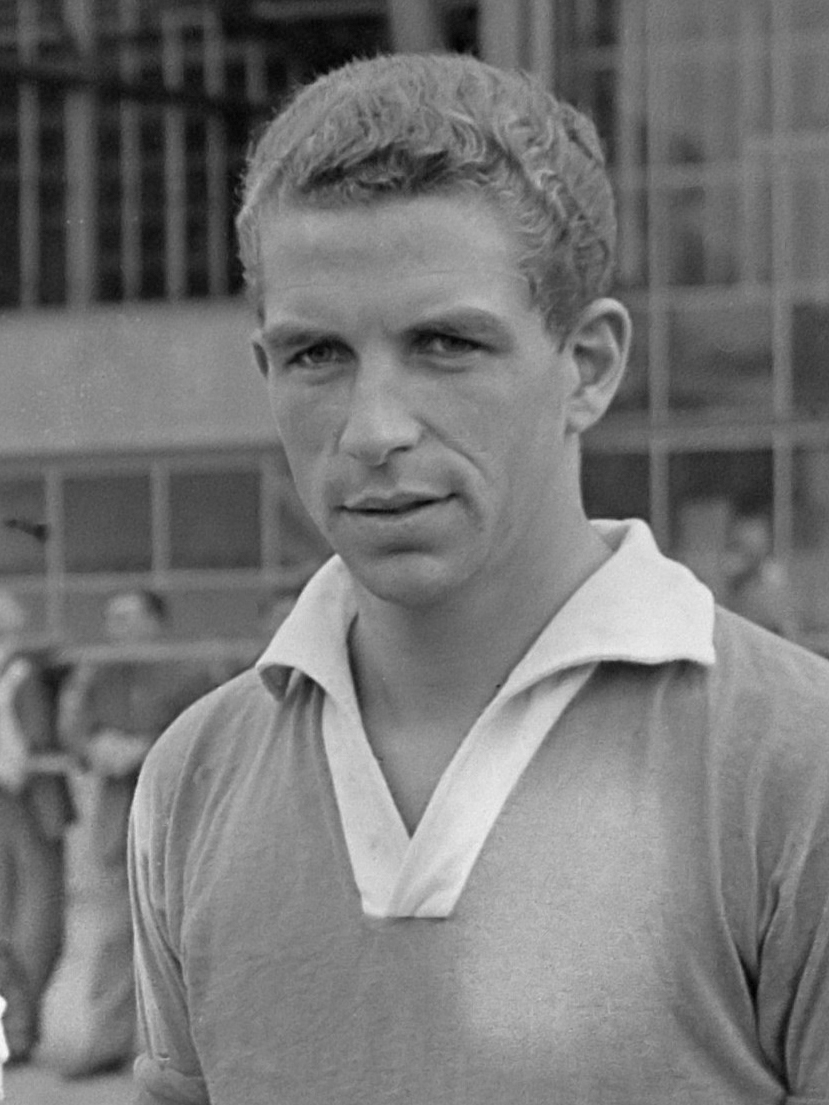
- Guus Haak in 1963

Personal information
- Full name: Augustinus Wilhelmus Haak
- Date of birth: 17 April 1937 (age 89)
- Place of birth: The Hague, Netherlands
- Position: Defender

Youth career
- 1952–1956: VCS

Senior career*
Years	Team	Apps	(Gls)
1956–1963	ADO	135	(17)
1963–1970	Feijenoord	164	(16)
1970–1971	Holland Sport	6	(0)
Total		305	(33)

International career
1962–1965	Netherlands	14	(0)

Managerial career
- 1973-1990: DHC
- 1990-1997: DSO
- 1998-1999: SVV/SMC
- * Club domestic league appearances and goals

Augustinus Wilhelmus "Guus" Haak (born 17 April 1937) is a Dutch retired footballer who played for Feyenoord and was part of their Champion's Cup victory in 1970.

Born and raised in The Hague, Haak lost his father in World War II and grew up with his mother and two siblings. He started playing football for VCS who sold him to professional side ADO.

He earned 14 caps for the Netherlands national football team.

After retiring as a player, Haak was head coach at DHC for 17 years and won the Sunday League championship twice with the club. They named a boardoom after him in his honour. He also coached DSO and SVV/SMC.
