= Piet Steenbergen =

Dutch footballer

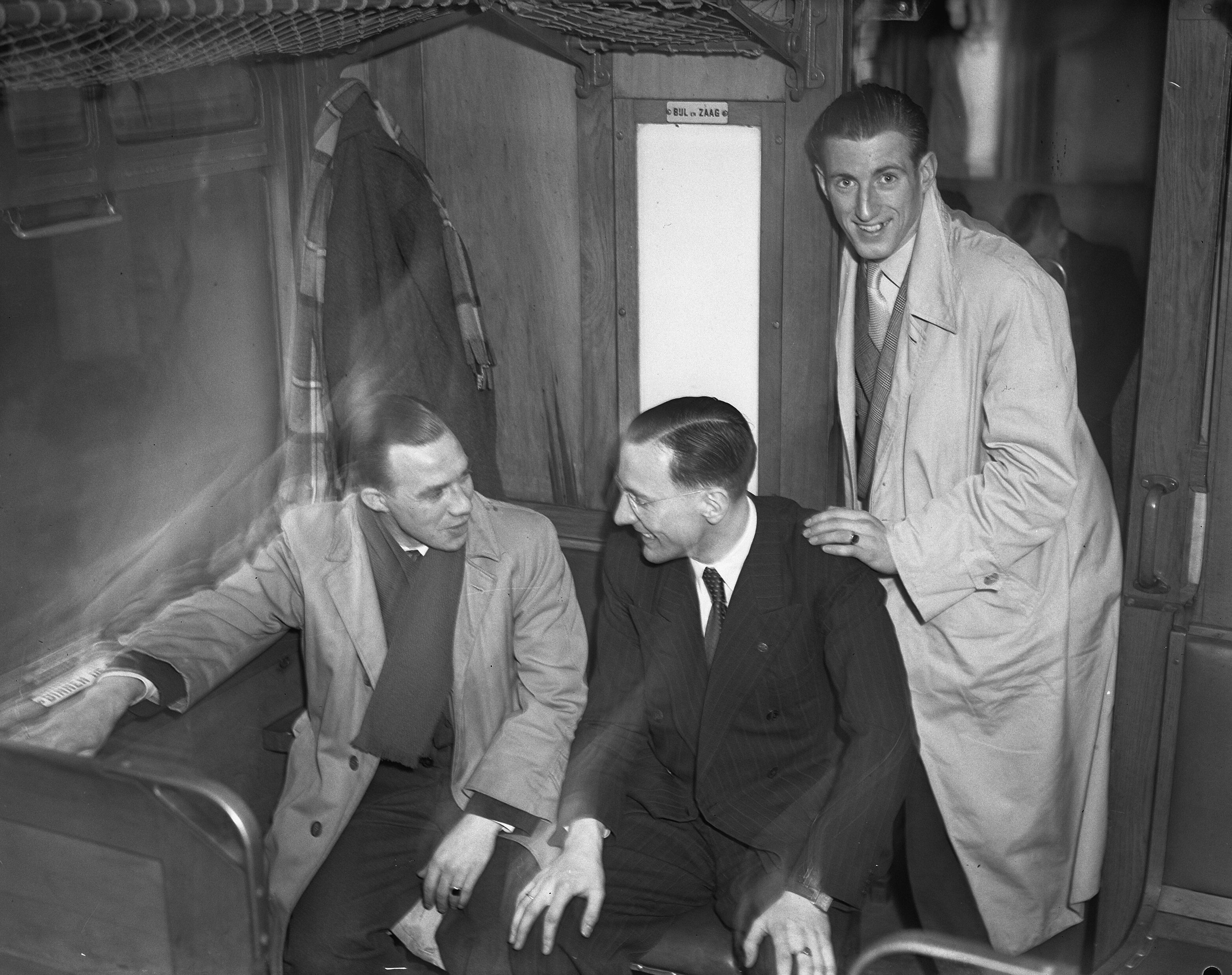

Personal information
- Full name: Piet Steenbergen
- Date of birth: 28 November 1928
- Place of birth: Rotterdam, Netherlands
- Date of death: 22 April 2010 (aged 81)
- Place of death: Rotterdam, Netherlands
- Position: Midfielder

Youth career
- Feijenoord

Senior career*
Years	Team	Apps	(Gls)
1946–1950	Feijenoord	?	(?)
1950–1952	Le Havre	9	(2)
1952–1959	Feijenoord	229	(25)

International career
1950–1955	Netherlands	2	(0)

Managerial career
- 1959–1964: Feyenoord Rotterdam (members' council)
- 1964–1971: Feyenoord Rotterdam (board member)
- * Club domestic league appearances and goals

Piet Steenbergen (28 November 1928 – 22 April 2010) was a Dutch professional footballer who played as a midfielder. Steenbergen made his debut at Feijenoord and also played for French club Le Havre AC. At Feijenoord he played a total of 229 matches in which he scored 25 times, divided over eleven seasons. He was born and died in Rotterdam.
