= Harry Vos =

Dutch footballer

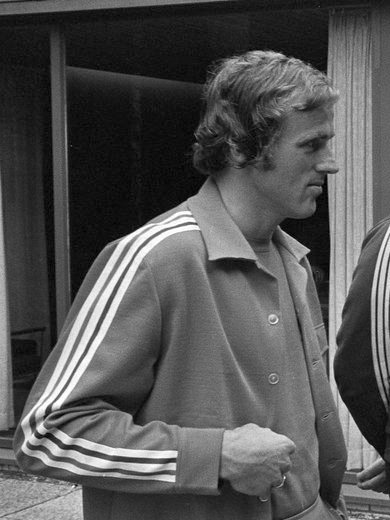
- Vos in 1974

Personal information
- Full name: Henry Antonie Vos
- Date of birth: 4 September 1946
- Place of birth: The Hague, Netherlands
- Date of death: 19 May 2010 (aged 63)
- Place of death: Delft, Netherlands
- Position: Defender

Youth career
- ADO

Senior career*
Years	Team	Apps	(Gls)
1965–1970	ADO	139	(3)
1970–1971	PSV Eindhoven	34	(0)
1971–1977	Feijenoord / Feyenoord	127	(1)
Total		300	(4)
Medal record
Men's football
Representing Netherlands
FIFA World Cup
Runner-up	1974 West Germany
- * Club domestic league appearances and goals

Henry Antonie "Harry" Vos (4 September 1946 – 19 May 2010) was a Dutch footballer who played as a defender.

== Club career ==
During his club career he played for ADO Den Haag, PSV Eindhoven and Feyenoord Rotterdam in the Eredivisie.

== International career ==
He was part of the Netherlands squad who finished as runners-up in the 1974 FIFA World Cup. However, he never earned any caps for the national team.

== Death ==
Vos died of cancer in May 2010.
