= Jaap Barendregt =

Dutch footballer

Personal information
- Full name: Jaap Barendregt
- Date of birth: 10 January 1905
- Place of birth: Rotterdam, Netherlands
- Date of death: 16 February 1954 (aged 49)
- Position: Striker

Youth career
- DCL
- Feijenoord

Senior career*
Years	Team	Apps	(Gls)
1925–1937	Feijenoord	238	(196)

International career
1929	Netherlands	1	(0)
- * Club domestic league appearances and goals

Jaap Barendregt (10 January 1905 – 16 February 1952) was a Dutch football striker.

== Club career ==
Barendregt played his whole career at Feijenoord and his total of 196 league goals is a club record, leading Kees Pijl and Cor van der Gijp. He played his first official game in 1925 against De Spartaan and his final one in 1937 against Go Ahead Eagles.

== International career ==
Behind the legendary Beb Bakhuys in the national team pecking order, he only earned one cap for the Netherlands, a March 1929 friendly match against Switzerland.

== Honours ==
- 1927–28 : Eredivisie winner with Feijenoord
- 1929–30 : KNVB Cup winner with Feijenoord
- 1934–35 : KNVB Cup winner with Feijenoord
- 1935–36 : Eredivisie winner with Feijenoord
