= Cor Veldhoen =

Dutch footballer

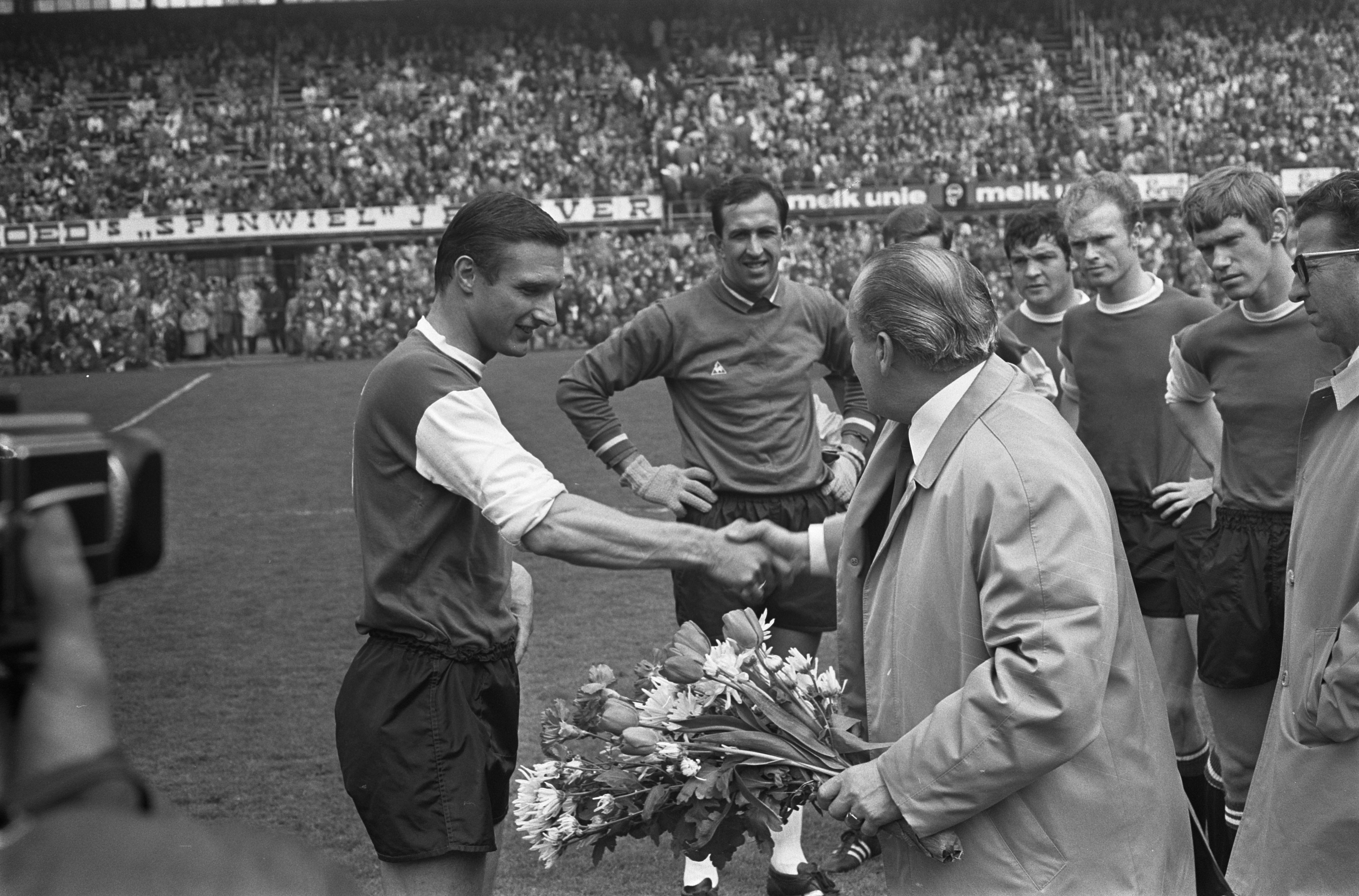
- Cor Veldhoen (left) in 1969

Personal information
- Full name: Cor Pleun Veldhoen
- Date of birth: 6 April 1939
- Place of birth: Rotterdam, Netherlands
- Date of death: 11 October 2005 (aged 66)
- Position: Defender

Youth career
- Feijenoord

Senior career*
Years	Team	Apps	(Gls)
1956–1970	Feijenoord	380	(2)

International career
1961–1967	Netherlands	27	(0)

Managerial career
- Feyenoord Rotterdam (board member)
- * Club domestic league appearances and goals

Cor Veldhoen (6 April 1939 – 11 October 2005) was a Dutch footballer who was active as a defender. Veldhoen played his whole professional career at Feijenoord and won 27 caps for the Netherlands.

== Honours ==
- 1960-61 : Eredivisie winner with Feijenoord
- 1961-62 : Eredivisie winner with Feijenoord
- 1964-65 : Eredivisie winner with Feijenoord
- 1964-65 : KNVB Cup winner with Feijenoord
- 1968-69 : Eredivisie winner with Feijenoord
- 1969-70 : European Cup winner with Feijenoord
