= Gerard Kuppen =

Dutch footballer

Personal information
- Date of birth: 6 February 1915
- Date of death: 23 September 1995 (aged 80)

International career
Years	Team	Apps	(Gls)
1937–1946	Netherlands	3	(0)

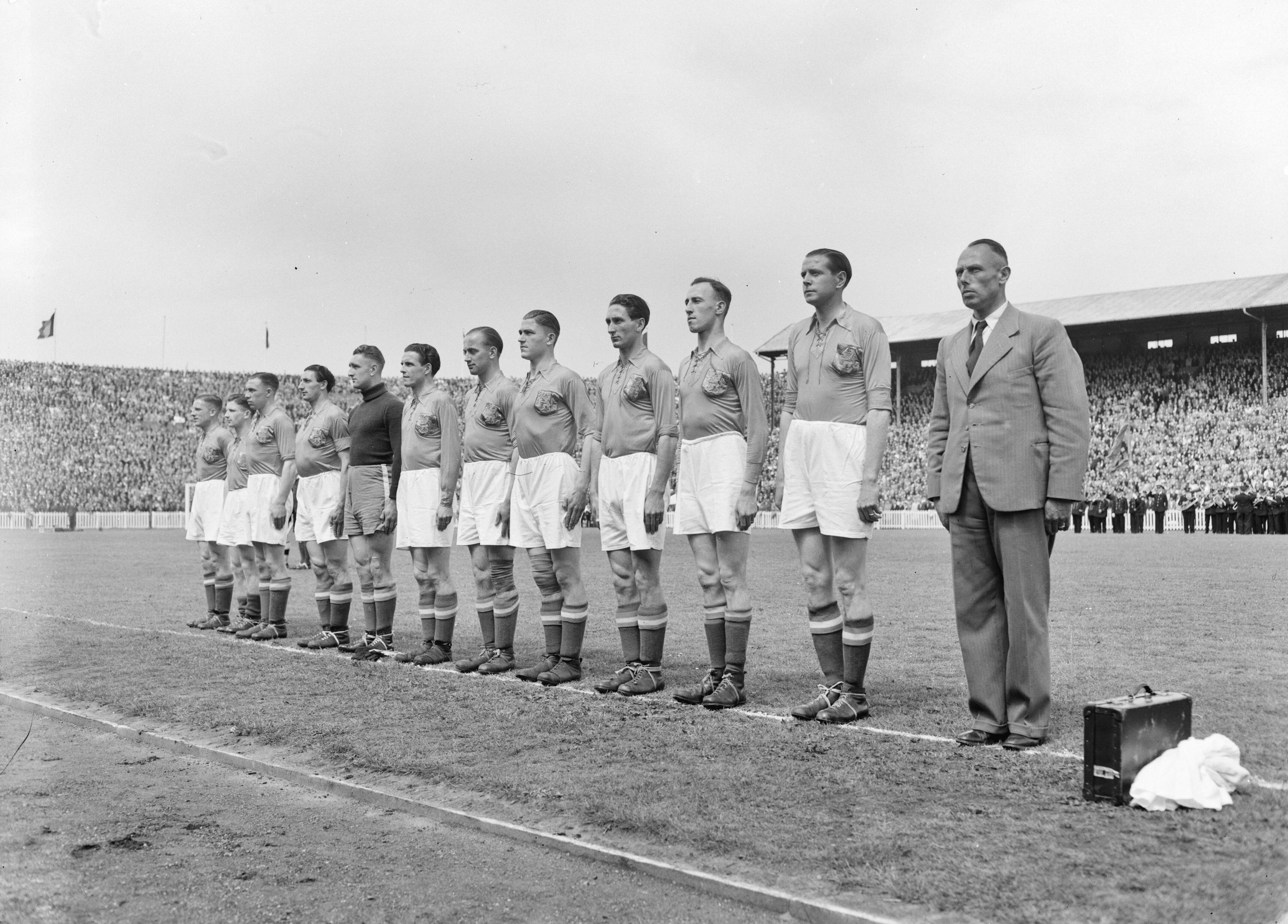

Gerard Kuppen (6 February 1915 – 23 September 1995) was a Dutch footballer. He played in three matches for the Netherlands national football team from 1937 to 1946.
