= Piet Fransen =

Dutch footballer

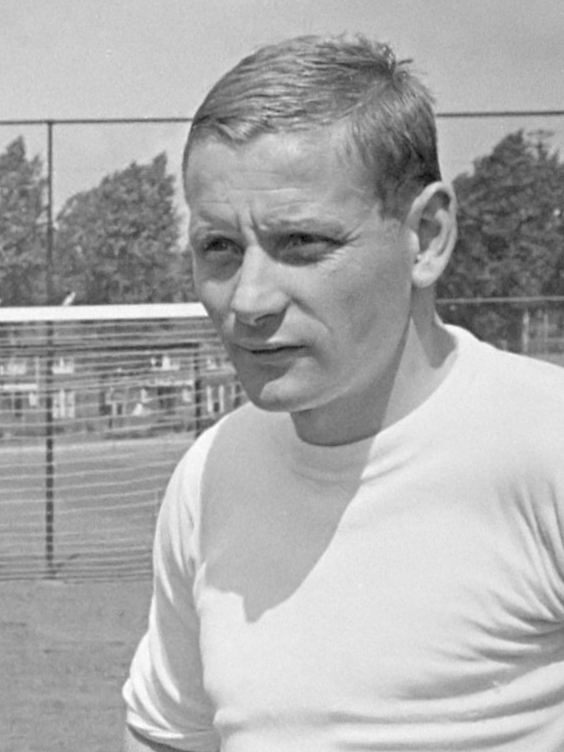
- Fransen in 1965

Personal information
- Date of birth: 5 July 1936
- Place of birth: Groningen, Netherlands
- Date of death: 2 August 2015 (aged 79)
- Place of death: Groningen, Netherlands
- Position: Midfielder

Youth career
- Velocitas 1897

Senior career*
| Years | Team | Apps | (Gls) |
| 1952–1957 | Velocitas 1897 | | |
| 1957–1965 | GVAV | 246 | (49) |
| 1965–1966 | Feyenoord | 40 | (6) |
| 1967–1971 | GVAV | 136 | (18) |
| 1971–1973 | FC Groningen | 65 | (5) |
| Total | | 487 | (78) |

International career
| 1964–1966 | Netherlands | 6 | (1) |
- * Club domestic league appearances and goals

Piet Fransen (5 July 1936 – 2 August 2015) was a Dutch footballer who played as a midfielder.

== Club career ==
Nicknamed Mr. FC Groningen, Fransen played the majority of his career for FC Groningen and its predecessor GVAV. He totalled 484 official matches for the club, scoring 82 goals. He started his career at Velocitas and was part of their first professional Tweede Divisie squad, when the third professional football league was introduced in the Netherlands in 1956.

He also had a spell at Feyenoord.

== International career ==
He made his debut for the Netherlands in an October 1964 FIFA World Cup qualification match against Albania and has earned a total of 6 caps, scoring 1 goal. He represented his country in 3 FIFA World Cup qualification matches.

His final international was a March 1966 friendly match against West Germany.

=== International goals ===
Scores and results list the Netherlands' goal tally first.

| # | Date | Venue | Opponent | Score | Result | Competition |
|---|---|---|---|---|---|---|
| 1 | 26 January 1965 | Bloomfield Stadium, Tel Aviv, Israel | Israel | 1–0 | 1–0 | Friendly match |

== Death and legacy ==
He died on 2 August 2015 in Groningen. A minute of silence was held ahead of the Johan Cruijff Shield match between Groningen and PSV Eindhoven later that day.

In 2007 a street in Groningen at the former Oosterpark Stadion terrain was named after Fransen. In 2011, the east stand of the Euroborg stadium was named Piet Fransen Stand.
