= Kees van Dijke =

Dutch footballer

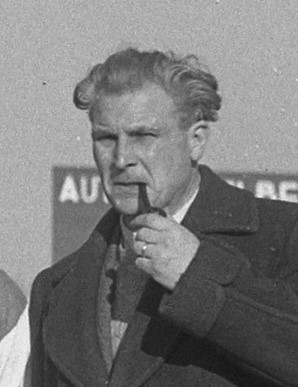
- Kees van Dijke in 1949

Personal information
- Full name: Cornelis Adriaan van Dijke
- Date of birth: 18 December 1902
- Place of birth: Rotterdam, Netherlands
- Date of death: 3 May 1983 (aged 80)
- Place of death: Moordrecht, Netherlands
- Position: Defender

Senior career*
Years	Team	Apps	(Gls)
1922–1934	Feijenoord	257	(30)

International career
1925	Netherlands	3	(0)

Managerial career
- 1936-1941: SVV
- 1941-1942: Feijenoord
- 1947-1949: SVV
- 1949-1950: Xerxes
- 1958-1959: PSV
- 1963-1964: Hermes DVS
- * Club domestic league appearances and goals

Kees van Dijke (18 December 1902 – 3 May 1983) was a Dutch footballer and manager. He played in three matches for the Netherlands national football team in 1925.

As a player, he won the 1924 league title with Feijenoord.

With SVV, Van Dijke won the club's only Dutch league title in 1949. He also managed Dutch giants Feijenoord and PSV.
