= Joop Hiele =

Dutch footballer

- Hiele in 1983

Personal information
- Full name: Johannes Frederik Hiele
- Date of birth: 25 December 1958 (age 67)
- Place of birth: Rotterdam, Netherlands
- Height: 1.85 m (6 ft 1 in)
- Position: Goalkeeper

Youth career
- VV Belvédère
- Feyenoord

Senior career*
Years	Team	Apps	(Gls)
1977–1990	Feyenoord	319	(0)
1990–1991	SVV	34	(0)
1991–1992	SVV/Dordrecht '90	34	(0)
1992–1994	Dordrecht '90	30	(0)
1994–1995	Go Ahead Eagles	32	(0)
Total		449	(0)

International career
1976–1977	Netherlands U19	8	(0)
1979–1980	Netherlands U21	4	(0)
1980–1991	Netherlands	7	(0)

Managerial career
- 1996–1998: Willem II (gk coach)
- 1996–2001: Netherlands U-21 (gk coach)
- 1998–2008: PSV (gk coach)
- 2001–2006: Netherlands (gk coach)
- 2006–2013: Feyenoord (gk coach)
- 2012–2015: ASWH (gk coach)
- 2013: ADO Den Haag (gk coach)
- 2015: ASWH (interim coach)
- 2015–2016: Zwaluwen Vlaardingen
- 2016–2018: XerxesDZB
- 2019–2022: SV Heienoord
Medal record
Representing Netherlands
UEFA European Championship
Winner	1988 West Germany
- * Club domestic league appearances and goals

Johannes Frederik "Joop" Hiele (born 25 December 1958 in Rotterdam) is a retired football goalkeeper from the Netherlands, who earned seven caps for the Netherlands national football team. He was a member of the Dutch team that won the European title at the 1988 European Football Championship in West Germany, but was second choice behind Hans van Breukelen.

== Playing career ==
Hiele started playing football at RVV Belvédère and his professional career with hometown club Feyenoord (1977–90), then moved to SVV (1990–92), Dordrecht'90 (1992–94) and ended his career at Go Ahead Eagles (1994–95).

Hiele played 8 games for the Netherlands national under-19 football team and made his debut for the senior team in a September 1980 World Cup qualification match away against Ireland. In 11 years, he only won 7 caps as he had been primarily second choice behind Piet Schrijvers, Pim Doesburg and Hans van Breukelen.

== Manager career ==
Later on, Hiele became a goalkeeping coach and worked for Willem II, Feyenoord, PSV and ADO Den Haag.

Hiele became a general football coach for the first time at ASWH, where he was a goalkeeping coach in 2012–2015 and for a while in 2015 general caretaker. Hiele continued to general coaching for Zwaluwen Vlaardingen, XerxesDZB, and SV Heienoord.

== Personal life ==
Hiele lived in Maasdam with his wife and daughter and he also worked as a mental health coach at a school in Schoonhoven. His daughter Cheryl won a Europeen Cup Winners Cup with her softball team Terrasvogels and played in the Netherlands u-21 team.

== Career statistics ==
=== International ===
Appearances and goals by national team and year
National team	Year	Apps	Goals
Netherlands	1980	1	0
Netherlands	1981	0	0
Netherlands	1983	0	0
Netherlands	1984	0	0
Netherlands	1985	0	0
Netherlands	1986	1	0
Netherlands	1987	1	0
Netherlands	1988	1	0
Netherlands	1989	2	0
Netherlands	1990	0	0
Netherlands	1991	1	0
Total		7	0

== Honours ==
Feyenoord

- Eredivisie: 1983–84
- KNVB Cup: 1979–80, 1983–84

Netherlands

- UEFA Euro 1988: winner
