= Jaap Paauwe =

Dutch footballer

Personal information
- Date of birth: 3 February 1909
- Date of death: 25 June 1982 (aged 73)

International career
Years	Team	Apps	(Gls)
1931–1932	Netherlands	8	(0)

Jaap Paauwe (3 February 1909 – 25 June 1982) was a Dutch footballer. He played in eight matches for the Netherlands national football team from 1931 to 1932.
