= Adri van Male =

Dutch footballer

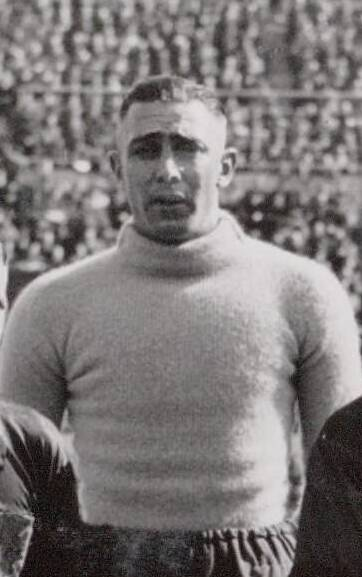

Personal information
- Full name: Adrianus van Male
- Date of birth: 7 October 1910
- Place of birth: Philippine, Netherlands
- Date of death: 11 October 1990 (aged 80)
- Position: Goalkeeper

International career
Years	Team	Apps	(Gls)
- Netherlands

Adrianus "Adri" van Male (7 October 1910, in Philippine – 11 October 1990) was a Dutch football goalkeeper.

He played 221 matches for Feyenoord from 1930 to 1939, and 15 matches for the Netherlands national football team from 1932 to 1940, and participated in the 1934 FIFA World Cup and the 1938 FIFA World Cup.
