= Joop van der Heide =

Dutch footballer

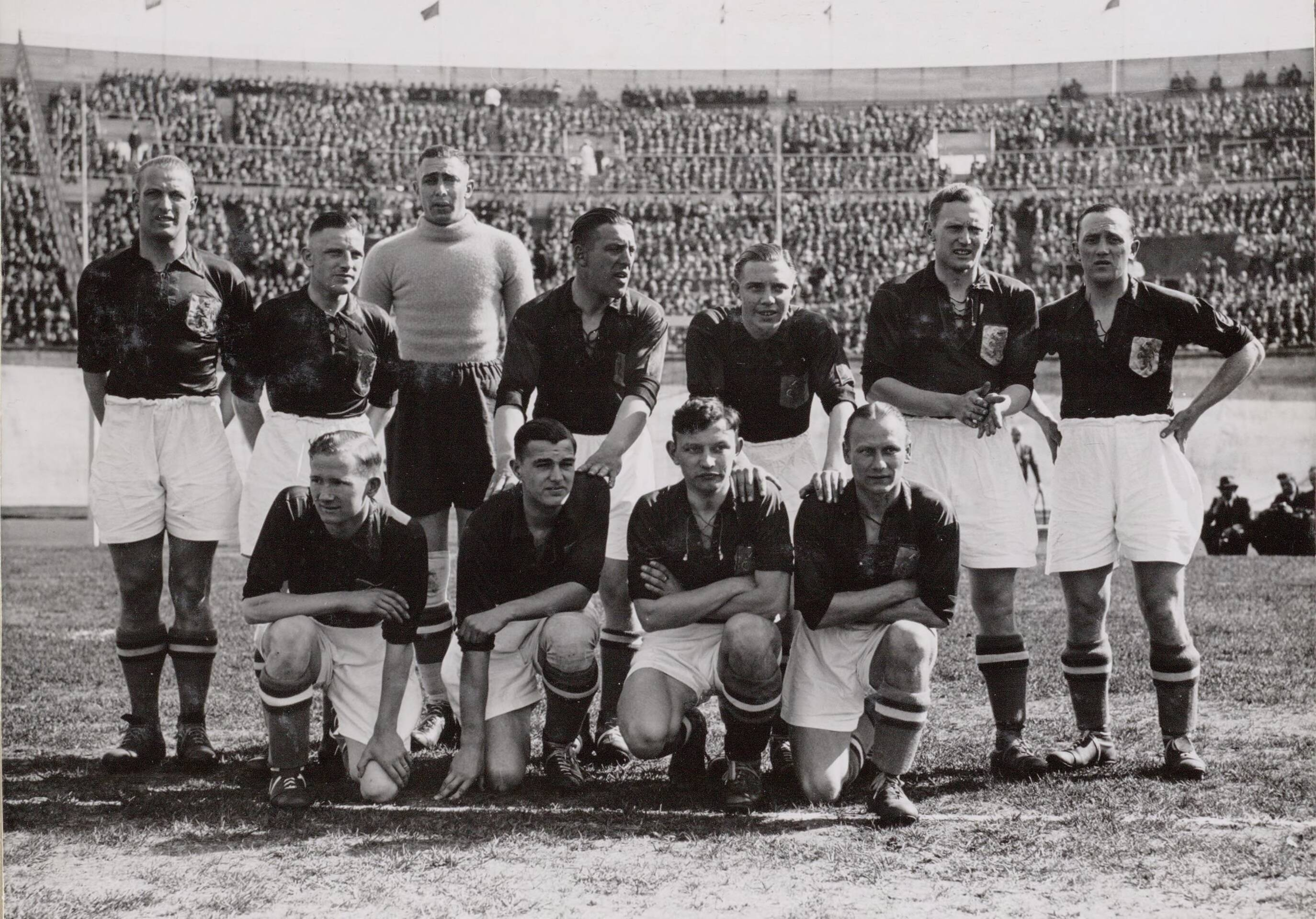
- Van der Heide in Oranje, standing second from right

Personal information
- Full name: Johannes van der Heide
- Date of birth: July 21, 1917
- Place of birth: Rotterdam, Netherlands
- Date of death: July 29, 1980 (aged 63)
- Place of death: Capelle aan den IJssel, Netherlands
- Position: Defender

Senior career*
Years	Team	Apps	(Gls)
1935–1949	Feijenoord	253	(1)

International career
1940	Netherlands	1	(0)
- * Club domestic league appearances and goals

Joop van der Heide (21 July 1917 – 29 July 1980) was a Dutch footballer. Born in Rotterdam, Van der Heide played his whole career at Feijenoord and won one cap for the Netherlands.

== World War II ==
A painter by profession, van der Heide famously returned to Rotterdam with the Canadian liberators in May 1945 after he had been captured by the German occupier during the raid of Rotterdam in November 1944.

== Honours ==
- Eredivisie: 1935-36, 1937-38, 1939-40
