= Christian Gyan =

Ghanaian footballer (1978–2021)

Personal information
- Full name: Christian Atta Gyan
- Date of birth: 2 November 1978
- Place of birth: Tema, Ghana
- Date of death: 29 December 2021 (aged 43)
- Height: 1.80 m (5 ft 11 in)
- Position: Defender

Youth career
- Ghapoha
- Feyenoord

Senior career*
Years	Team	Apps	(Gls)
1997–2007	Feyenoord	93	(3)
1998	→ Excelsior (loan)	16	(0)
2006–2007	→ Excelsior (loan)	16	(0)
2008–2009	TPS	16	(0)
2009	Wrexham	0	(0)
2010	RoPS	0	(0)
Total		131	(3)

International career
- Ghana U20
1998–2001	Ghana	8	(0)
- * Club domestic league appearances and goals

Christian Atta Gyan (2 November 1978 – 29 December 2021) was a Ghanaian professional footballer who played as a defender. He was known primarily for his time at Feyenoord where he won the 1998–99 Eredivisie and the 2001–02 UEFA Cup.

== Club career ==
Gyan was born in Tema, Ghana on 2 November 1978. Playing for Ghapoha, he signed for Feyenoord in 1996. During the following season he moved on loan to Excelsior. After only a couple of months Feyenoord recalled the defender, and he made his debut for Feyenoord that same season. Gyan remained with Feyenoord for the next eight seasons. He was mainly used as a substitute. Gyan did play the 2002 UEFA Cup Final against Borussia Dortmund. He replaced the suspended Brett Emerton in the starting eleven. With Gyan, Feyenoord went on to beat Dortmund 3–2. While at Feyenoord Gyan also won a Dutch League Championship and a Johan Cruijff Schaal. Gyan was one of the most popular players at Feyenoord, always gaining a big applause from the fans when he started his warming-up.

In June 2008 Gyan completed a successful trial for the Finnish club Turun Palloseura, and he signed a six-month deal with TPS on 3 June. In January 2009 Gyan signed for Wrexham until the end of the 2008–09 season, but made only two appearances for the club in the FA Trophy before being released at the end of the season. He signed a contract for RoPS in February 2010. In July, he got released by the club because of knee injury that happened in February. Gyan did not make any appearances for RoPS. He finished his career at amateur side RKSV Leonidas in Rotterdam.

== International career ==
Gyan was part of the Ghana team that won the 1995 FIFA U-17 World Championship.

Gyan played seven games at the 1997 FIFA World Youth Championship, where Ghana finished fourth.

His full international debut, incidentally, came against the Netherlands. For the senior side he featured eight times between 1998 and 2001, including at the 2000 Africa Cup of Nations.

== Personal life and death ==
Gyan was diagnosed with terminal cancer in November 2021. He died from the disease a month later on 29 December 2021, at the age of 43.

== Honours ==
Feyenoord

- UEFA Cup: 2001–02
- Eredivisie: 1998-99
- Johan Cruyff Shield: 1999
