= Manus Vrauwdeunt =

Dutch footballer

Personal information
- Full name: Hermanus Lodevicus Willebrordus Vrauwdeunt
- Date of birth: 29 April 1915
- Place of birth: Rotterdam, Netherlands
- Date of death: 8 June 1982 (aged 67)
- Positions: Midfielder; forward

Youth career
- Feijenoord

Senior career*
Years	Team	Apps	(Gls)
1931–1947	Feijenoord	253	(123)

International career^{‡}
1937	Netherlands	1	(1)
- * Club domestic league appearances and goals as of 9 June 2007 ‡ National team caps and goals as of 9 June 2007

Hermanus Lodevicus Willebrordus "Manus" Vrauwdeunt (29 April 1915 – 8 June 1982) is a former Dutch footballer who was active as a midfielder and forward. Vrauwdeunt played his whole career at Feijenoord and won one cap for the Netherlands, a friendly match against Switzerland (2–1 victory) on 7 March 1937.

== Honours ==
- 1935–36 : Eredivisie winner with Feijenoord
- 1937–38 : Eredivisie winner with Feijenoord
- 1939–40 : Eredivisie winner with Feijenoord
