= Theo Laseroms =

Dutch footballer (1940–1991)

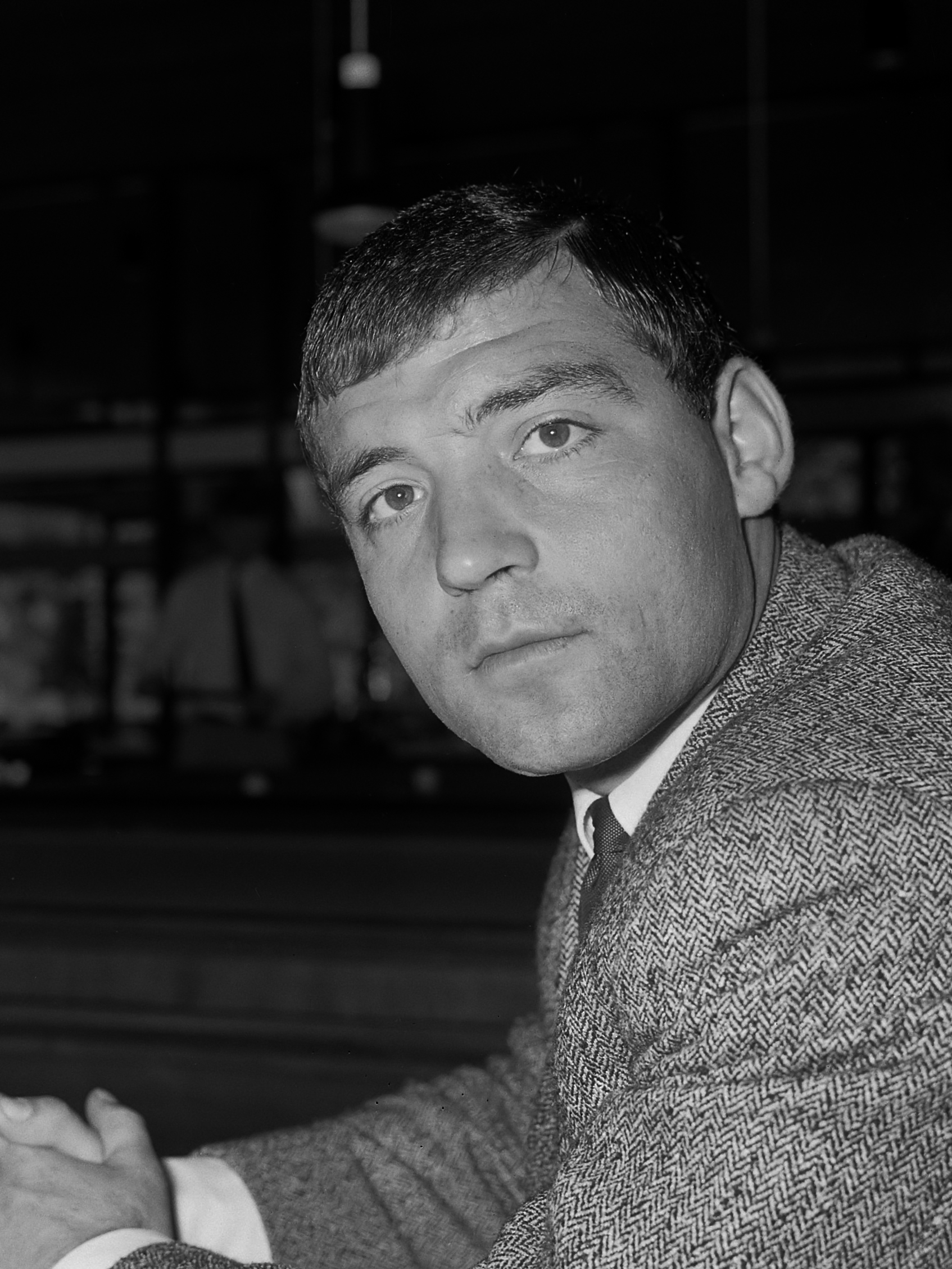
- Laseroms in 1965

Personal information
- Full name: Matheus Wilhelmus Theodorus Laseroms
- Date of birth: 8 March 1940
- Place of birth: Roosendaal, Netherlands
- Date of death: 25 April 1991 (aged 51)
- Place of death: Zwolle, Netherlands
- Height: 1.80 m (5 ft 11 in)
- Position: Defender

Youth career
- 1952–1957: RBC

Senior career*
Years	Team	Apps	(Gls)
1957–1958	RBC		
1958–1963	NAC	129	(28)
1963–1967	Sparta	104	(11)
1967	Pittsburgh Phantoms	13	(3)
1968–1972	Feijenoord	123	(4)
1972–1974	Gent	56	(2)

International career
1965–1970	Netherlands	6	(1)

Managerial career
- 1974–1975: Ieper
- 1975–1979: Vlaardingen '74
- 1979–1981: Heracles Almelo
- 1982–1984: West Riffa
- 1985–1986: Bahrain
- 1986–1987: Al-Nahda Club
- 1987–1988: Helmond Sport
- 1988–1989: PEC Zwolle
- 1989–1990: Trabzonspor
- 1990–1991: Çengelköyspor
- * Club domestic league appearances and goals

Matheus Wilhelmus Theodorus "Theo" Laseroms (8 March 1940 – 25 April 1991) was a Dutch football player and manager. A defender, he made a name for himself when he played for Feijenoord. He gained six caps for the Netherlands national team. His grandson Mick van Buren is also a football player.

== Club career ==
Laseroms, nicknamed De Tank or Theo de Tank, was famous for his sliding tackle. His career had started in 1956 at RBC, followed in 1958 by NAC. In 1963, he switched to Sparta Rotterdam, with whom he won the KNVB Cup in 1966. In 1967, Laseroms signed with the Pittsburgh Phantoms of the newly created National Professional Soccer League (NPSL) while still under contract with Sparta Rotterdam. Sparta sued Pittsburgh in both the United States and the Netherlands and received $50,000 from the Phantoms.

In 1968 he moved to Feijenoord where he would form the defensive core alongside Rinus Israël. He played four seasons for Feijenoord through late sixties and early seventies. Laseroms was part of the team that won the European Cup in 1970 after a 2–1 final win over Celtic and in that same year the Intercontinental Cup against Argentinian club Estudiantes de La Plata. He also became champion twice with Feijenoord, in the seasons 1968–69 and 1970–71. In the seasons 1969–70 and 1971–72, Laseroms finished in second place with Feyenoord. The KNVB Cup was won in the 1968–69 season. He was part of the team that included Eddy Pieters Graafland, Eddy Treijtel, Piet Romeijn, Rinus Israël, Theo van Duivenbode, Franz Hasil, Wim Jansen, Willem van Hanegem, Henk Wery, Ove Kindvall and Coen Moulijn.

After leaving the club in 1972, he played for the Belgian club Gent for two more years.

== International career ==
In April 1965, Laseroms made his first international appearance for the Netherlands against Northern Ireland.

== Managerial career ==
Laseroms did an internship at Ajax in Amsterdam in the 1975–76 season before obtaining his training diploma; a team then consisting of players such as Frank Arnesen, Søren Lerby, Tscheu La Ling and Ruud Geels and was coached by Rinus Michels in his second period. Laseroms then started a less successful coaching career with Heracles, Helmond Sport, Vlaardingen '74, Trabzonspor and clubs from Bahrain and Saudi Arabia, among others.

== Death ==
Laseroms died of heart attack on 25 April 1991, aged 51.

== Career statistics ==
=== International ===
Appearances and goals by national team and year
National team	Year	Apps	Goals
Netherlands	1965	2	1
Netherlands	1966	0	0
Netherlands	1967	0	0
Netherlands	1968	2	0
Netherlands	1969	1	0
Netherlands	1970	1	0
Total		6	1

Scores and results list the Netherlands' goal tally first, score column indicates score after each Laseroms goal.

List of international goals scored by Theo Laseroms
No.	Date	Venue	Opponent	Score	Result	Competition
1	14 November 1965	Bern, Switzerland	Switzerland	1–1	1–2	1966 FIFA World Cup qualification

== Honours ==
=== Player ===
Sparta

- KNVB Cup: 1965–66

Feyenoord

- Eredivisie: 1968–69, 1970–71
- KNVB Cup: 1968–69
- European Cup: 1969–70
- Intercontinental Cup: 1970
