= 1970 European Cup final =

- Match programme cover
- Event: 1969–70 European Cup
Feyenoord	Celtic
(Netherlands)	(Scotland)
2	1
- After extra time
- Date: 6 May 1970
- Venue: San Siro, Milan
- Referee: Concetto Lo Bello (Italy)
- Attendance: 53,187

The 1970 European Cup final was an association football match played between Feijenoord (Note: Though the club was interchangeably referred to as either SC Feijenoord (the original Dutch spelling) or Feyenoord (the spelling used internationally) in the years prior, it would not be until 1974 that the club officially changed its name to Feyenoord, which is an anglicised spelling.) of the Netherlands and Celtic of Scotland on 6 May 1970 at the San Siro, Milan, Italy. The showpiece event was the final match of the 1969–70 season of Europe's premier cup competition, the European Cup. Feyenoord were appearing in their first final, while Celtic were appearing in their second final, after winning the competition in 1967. Feyenoord won 2–1 after extra time. Ove Kindvall's goal in the 117th minute meant the trophy was won by a Dutch club for the first time. It remains Feyenoord's only European Cup triumph.

For losing finalists Celtic, this marked the second, and to date most recent, European Cup final appearance in club history, after the famous win by the "Lisbon Lions" side in the 1967 edition. The match nearly never took place due to massive strikes throughout Italy in 1970; the Italian Football Federation backed down to ensure that their own clubs would be able to compete in further UEFA competitions.

== Route to the final ==
Feyenoord				Round	Celtic			
Opponent	Agg.	1st leg	2nd leg		Opponent	Agg.	1st leg	2nd leg
(Iceland) KR	16–2	12–2 (H) (Note: Despite the second leg of Feyenoord's first round tie against Icelandic minnows KR being officially designated as an "away" match, both legs were actually played at the Stadion Feijenoord in Rotterdam.)	4–0 (A)	First round	(Switzerland) Basel	2–0	0–0 (A)	2–0 (H)
(Italy) AC Milan	2–1	0–1 (A)	2–0 (H)	Second round	(Portugal) Benfica	3–3 (c)	3–0 (H)	0–3 (a.e.t.) (A)
(East Germany) Vorwärts Berlin	2–1	0–1 (A)	2–0 (H)	Quarter-finals	(Italy) Fiorentina	3–1	3–0 (H)	0–1 (A)
(Poland) Legia Warsaw	2–0	0–0 (A)	2–0 (H)	Semi-finals	(England) Leeds United	3–1	1–0 (A)	2–1 (H)

== Match ==
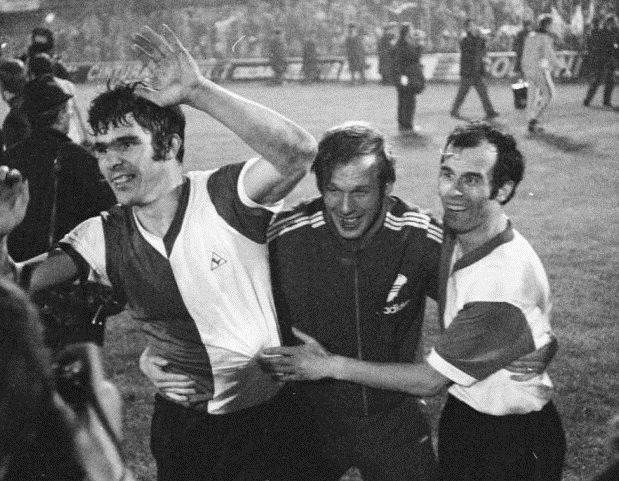
Willem van Hanegem, Piet Vrauwdeunt, and Coen Moulijn

=== Summary ===
In contrast to their win in the European Cup final three years prior, in which they had gone into the match as heavy underdogs against Inter Milan, this time around, Celtic entered the final as strong favourites over Feyenoord. However, despite Celtic's Tommy Gemmell opening the scoring after 30 minutes, they were outplayed by the Dutch outfit, whose manager, Ernst Happel, ensured Celtic winger Jimmy Johnstone was double marked at all times, whilst the midfield trio of Franz Hasil, Willem van Hanegem, and Wim Jansen dominated their Scottish counterparts. Rinus Israël quickly equalised with his head; remarkably, this was the first goal of Feyenoord's European campaign that they scored away from their home stadium. In the second half, Celtic managed to hold on at 1–1 to force extra time.

With just a few minutes of extra-time remaining, a long free-kick from the Feyenoord half was sent towards the Celtic penalty area. Celtic defender and captain Billy McNeill stumbled and misjudged the ball, and as he tried to recover he appeared to punch the ball away. Before the referee had a chance to award a penalty, Ove Kindvall reacted quickly, running on and chipping the ball over the advancing goalkeeper Evan Williams to seal a 2–1 win for Feyenoord.

=== Details ===
6 May 1970

Feyenoord (Netherlands)	2–1 (a.e.t.)	(Scotland) Celtic
Israël 32'; Kindvall 117'	Report	Gemmell 30'

San Siro, Milan
Attendance: 53,187
Referee: Concetto Lo Bello (Italy)

Feyenoord	Celtic

GK	1	(Netherlands) Eddy Pieters Graafland
RB	2	(Netherlands) Piet Romeijn	(substituted off) 106'
CB	4	(Netherlands) Theo Laseroms
CB	3	(Netherlands) Rinus Israël (c) 32'
LB	5	(Netherlands) Theo van Duivenbode
CM	7	(Netherlands) Wim Jansen
RM	6	(Austria) Franz Hasil
LM	10	(Netherlands) Willem van Hanegem
RW	8	(Netherlands) Henk Wery
CF	9	(Sweden) Ove Kindvall 117'
LW	11	(Netherlands) Coen Moulijn
Substitutes:
MF	15	(Netherlands) Guus Haak	(substituted on) 106'
GK		(Netherlands) Eddy Treijtel
DF		(Netherlands) Cor Veldhoen
MF		(Netherlands) Piet Vrauwdeunt
DF		(Netherlands) Joop van Daele
Manager:
(Austria) Ernst Happel

GK	1	(Scotland) Evan Williams
RB	2	(Scotland) David Hay
CB	5	(Scotland) Billy McNeill (c)
CB	6	(Scotland) Jim Brogan
LB	3	(Scotland) Tommy Gemmell 30'
CM	4	(Scotland) Bobby Murdoch
CM	10	(Scotland) Bertie Auld	(substituted off) 77'
RW	7	(Scotland) Jimmy Johnstone
CF	9	(Scotland) John Hughes
CF	8	(Scotland) Willie Wallace
LW	11	(Scotland) Bobby Lennox
Substitutes:
GK	12	(Scotland) John Fallon
RB	13	(Scotland) Jim Craig
MF	14	(Scotland) George Connelly	(substituted on) 77'
MF	15	(Scotland) Tommy Callaghan
FW	16	(Scotland) Harry Hood
Manager:
(Scotland) Jock Stein

== See also ==
- 1969–70 Celtic F.C. season
- 1970 European Cup Winners' Cup final
- 1970 Inter-Cities Fairs Cup final
- 1970 Intercontinental Cup
- Feyenoord in international football
- Celtic F.C. in international football
