= Feyenoord in international football =

Dutch association football club records

Feyenoord in European football
- Club: Feyenoord
- Seasons played: 51
- First entry: 1961–62 European Cup
- Latest entry: 2026–27 UEFA Champions League

Titles
- Champions League: 1: 1970
- Europa League: 2: 1974; 2002
- Intercontinental Cup: 1: 1970

Feyenoord is one of the three major association football clubs in the Netherlands, and have a successful record playing in European competition. They have won the European Cup/Champions League one time, and the UEFA Cup twice. In addition, the club has also won the Intercontinental Cup once, and played in one UEFA Super Cup match. Below is a list of all official European matches contested by Feyenoord.

== History ==
=== 1960s: European Breakthrough and First Triumph ===
Feyenoord made their European debut in the 1961–62 European Cup but had their first significant impact in the late 1960s. The club reached the semi-finals of the 1962–63 European Cup, where they were eliminated by Benfica. However, their golden moment came in the 1969–70 season, when Feyenoord became the first Dutch club to win the European Cup. Led by coach Ernst Happel and key players like Ove Kindvall and Willem van Hanegem, they defeated Celtic F.C. 2–1 in the final after extra time, securing their place in history.

=== 1970s & 1980s: Super Cup, UEFA Cup, and Decline ===
Following their European Cup success, Feyenoord won the 1970 Intercontinental Cup against Estudiantes, proving their strength on the global stage. In the mid-1970s, they remained competitive in Europe but were overshadowed by Ajax and later PSV Eindhoven. The club found continental success again in the 1973–74 UEFA Cup, defeating Tottenham Hotspur in the final. However, the 1980s saw a decline in European performances, with Feyenoord rarely progressing far in European competitions.

=== 1990s: UEFA Cup Redemption ===
The 1990s marked Feyenoord’s return to the European spotlight, particularly with the introduction of the UEFA Champions League. They were regular participants in the competition, with a notable campaign in the 1993–94 season when they reached the group stage. In the 1994–95 UEFA Cup Winners’ Cup, Feyenoord advanced to the semi-finals before being eliminated by Real Zaragoza. Despite strong domestic performances, they struggled to make deep runs in European tournaments. Their best Champions League performance of the decade came in 1999–2000, when they topped their group and reached the second group stage, showcasing their ability to compete at the highest level.

=== 2000s: Champions League and Another UEFA Cup Victory ===
The early 2000s saw Feyenoord consistently competing in the Champions League, with a notable second-round finish in 1999–2000. However, their crowning achievement came in the 2001–02 UEFA Cup. Under coach Bert van Marwijk, Feyenoord defeated Borussia Dortmund 3–2 in the final, played at their home ground, De Kuip. This victory secured their third UEFA Cup and reaffirmed their status as a European contender.

=== 2010s: Group Stages and Struggles ===
The 2010s were a challenging decade for Feyenoord in Europe. While they frequently participated in the Europa League and Champions League, deep runs were rare. A highlight was the 2016–17 season when they won the Eredivisie and qualified for the 2017–18 Champions League, marking their return to Europe’s elite competition after 15 years. However, they struggled in the group stage, finishing last.

=== 2020s: Europa Conference League Final and Continued Ambition ===
Feyenoord regained European relevance in the 2021–22 season, reaching the final of the inaugural UEFA Europa Conference League under coach Arne Slot. They lost 1–0 to AS Roma but demonstrated their ability to compete on the European stage once more. In subsequent seasons, they continued to participate in European competitions, aiming to build on their resurgence and challenge for another major continental trophy.

== European match history ==
As of 3 November 2026

Season	Round	Opponent	Home	Away	Aggregate
1961–62 European Cup	Preliminary round	(Sweden) IFK Göteborg	8–2	3–0	11–2
1961–62 European Cup	First round	(England) Tottenham Hotspur	1–3	1–1	2–4
1962–63 European Cup	Preliminary round	(Switzerland) Servette	1–3	3–1	4–4 (Note: Feyenoord won 3–1 in the replay played in Dusseldorf, Germany.) (3–1 (replay, a.e.t.))
1962–63 European Cup	First round	(Hungary) Vasas	1–1	2–2	3–3 (Note: Feyenoord won 1–0 in the replay played in Deurne, Belgium.) (1–0 replay)
1962–63 European Cup	Quarter-final	(France) Reims	1–1	1–0	2–1
1962–63 European Cup	Semi-final	(Portugal) Benfica	0–0	1–3	1–3
1965–66 European Cup	Preliminary round	(Spain) Real Madrid	2–1	0–5	2–6
1968–69 Inter-Cities Fairs Cup	First round	(England) Newcastle United	2–0	0–4	2–4
1969–70 European Cup	First round	(Iceland) KR	12–2	4–0	16–2
1969–70 European Cup	Second round	(Italy) Milan	2–0	0–1	2–1
1969–70 European Cup	Quarter-final	(East Germany) Vorwärts Berlin	2–0	0–1	2–1
1969–70 European Cup	Semi-final	(Poland) Legia Warsaw	2–0	0–0	2–0
1969–70 European Cup	Final	(Scotland) Celtic	2–1 (a.e.t.)		
1970–71 European Cup	First round	(Romania) UTA Arad	1–1	0–0	1–1 (a)
1971–72 European Cup	First round	(Cyprus) Olympiakos Nicosia	8–0	9–0	17–0
1971–72 European Cup	Second round	(Romania) Dinamo București	3–0	2–0	5–0
1971–72 European Cup	Quarter-final	(Portugal) Benfica	1–0	1–5	2–5
1972–73 UEFA Cup	First round	(Luxembourg) US Rumelange	9–0	12–0	21–0
1972–73 UEFA Cup	Second round	(Socialist Federal Republic of Yugoslavia) OFK Beograd	4–3	1–2	5–5 (a)
1973–74 UEFA Cup	First round	(Sweden) Öster	2–1	3–1	5–2
1973–74 UEFA Cup	Second round	(Poland) Gwardia Warsaw	3–1	0–1	3–2
1973–74 UEFA Cup	Third round	(Belgium) Standard Liège	2–0	1–3	3–3 (a)
1973–74 UEFA Cup	Quarter-final	(Poland) Ruch Chorzów	3–1 (a.e.t.)	1–1	4–2
1973–74 UEFA Cup	Semi-final	(West Germany) VfB Stuttgart	2–1	2–2	4–3
1973–74 UEFA Cup	Final	(England) Tottenham Hotspur	2–0	2–2	4–2
1974–75 European Cup	First round	(Northern Ireland) Coleraine	7–0	4–1	11–1
1974–75 European Cup	Second round	(Spain) Barcelona	0–0	0–3	0–3
1975–76 UEFA Cup	First round	(England) Ipswich Town	1–2	0–2	1–4
1976–77 UEFA Cup	First round	(Sweden) Djurgården	3–0	1–2	4–2
1976–77 UEFA Cup	Second round	(West Germany) 1. FC Kaiserslautern	5–0	2–2	7–2
1976–77 UEFA Cup	Third round	(Spain) Español	2–0	1–0	3–0
1976–77 UEFA Cup	Quarter-final	(Belgium) Molenbeek	0–0	1–2	1–2
1979–80 UEFA Cup	First round	(England) Everton	1–0	1–0	2–0
1979–80 UEFA Cup	Second round	(Sweden) Malmö FF	4–0	1–1	5–1
1979–80 UEFA Cup	Third round	(West Germany) Eintracht Frankfurt	1–0	1–4	2–4
1980–81 Cup Winners' Cup	First round	(Finland) Ilves	4–2	3–1	7–3
1980–81 Cup Winners' Cup	Second round	(Denmark) Hvidovre	1–0	2–1	3–1
1980–81 Cup Winners' Cup	Quarter-final	(Bulgaria) Slavia Sofia	4–0	2–3	6–3
1980–81 Cup Winners' Cup	Semi-final	(Soviet Union) Dinamo Tbilisi (Note: A team of Georgia today.)	2–0	0–3	2–3
1981–82 UEFA Cup	First round	(Poland) Szombierki Bytom	2–0	1–1	3–1
1981–82 UEFA Cup	Second round	(East Germany) Dynamo Dresden	2–1	1–1	3–2
1981–82 UEFA Cup	Third round	(Socialist Federal Republic of Yugoslavia) Radnički Niš	1–0	0–2	1–2
1983–84 UEFA Cup	First round	(Scotland) St Mirren	2–0	1–0	3–0
1983–84 UEFA Cup	Second round	(England) Tottenham Hotspur	0–2	2–4	2–6
1984–85 European Cup	First round	(Greece) Panathinaikos	0–0	1–2	1–2
1985–86 UEFA Cup	First round	(Portugal) Sporting CP	2–1	1–3	3–4
1986–87 UEFA Cup	First round	(Hungary) Pécsi MFC	2–0	0–1	2–1
1986–87 UEFA Cup	Second round	(West Germany) Borussia Mönchengladbach	0–2	1–5	1–7
1987–88 UEFA Cup	First round	Spora Luxembourg	5–0	5–2	10–2
1987–88 UEFA Cup	Second round	(Scotland) Aberdeen	1–0	1–2	2–2 (a)
1987–88 UEFA Cup	Third round	(West Germany) Bayer Leverkusen	2–2	0–1	2–3
1989–90 UEFA Cup	First round	(West Germany) VfB Stuttgart	2–1	0–2	2–3
1991–92 Cup Winners' Cup	First round	(Albania) Partizani	1–0	0–0	1–0
1991–92 Cup Winners' Cup	Second round	(Switzerland) Sion	0–0 (a.e.t.)	0–0	0–0 (5–3 p)
1991–92 Cup Winners' Cup	Quarter-final	(England) Tottenham Hotspur	1–0	0–0	1–0
1991–92 Cup Winners' Cup	Semi-final	(France) Monaco	2–2	1–1	3–3 (a)
1992–93 Cup Winners' Cup	First round	(Israel) Hapoel Petah Tikva	1–0	1–2	2–2 (a)
1992–93 Cup Winners' Cup	Second round	(Switzerland) Luzern	4–1	0–1	4–2
1992–93 Cup Winners' Cup	Quarter-final	(Russia) Spartak Moscow	0–1	1–3	1–4
1993–94 Champions League	First round	(Iceland) ÍA	3–0	0–1	3–1
1993–94 Champions League	Second round	(Portugal) Porto	0–0	0–1	0–1
1994–95 Cup Winners' Cup	First round	(Lithuania) Žalgiris	2–1	1–1	3–2
1994–95 Cup Winners' Cup	Second round	(Germany) Werder Bremen	1–0	4–3	5–3
1994–95 Cup Winners' Cup	Quarter-final	(Spain) Zaragoza	1–0	0–2	1–2
1995–96 Cup Winners' Cup	First round	(Latvia) DAG-Liepaya	6–0	7–0	13–0
1995–96 Cup Winners' Cup	Second round	(England) Everton	1–0	0–0	1–0
1995–96 Cup Winners' Cup	Quarter-final	(Germany) Borussia Mönchengladbach	1–0	2–2	3–2
1995–96 Cup Winners' Cup	Semi-final	(Austria) Rapid Wien	1–1	0–3	1–4
1996–97 UEFA Cup	First round	(Russia) CSKA Moscow	1–1	1–0	2–1
1996–97 UEFA Cup	Second round	(Spain) Espanyol	0–1	3–0	3–1
1996–97 UEFA Cup	Third round	(Spain) Tenerife	2–4	0–0	2–4
1997–98 Champions League	Second qualifying round	(Finland) Jazz	6–2	2–1	8–3
1997–98 Champions League	Group stage	(Italy) Juventus	2–0	1–5	3rd
1997–98 Champions League	Group stage	(Slovakia) Košice	2–0	1–0	3rd
1997–98 Champions League	Group stage	(England) Manchester United	1–3	1–2	3rd
1998–99 UEFA Cup	First round	(Germany) VfB Stuttgart	0–3	3–1	3–4
1999–2000 Champions League	First group stage	(Germany) Borussia Dortmund	1–1	1–1	2nd
1999–2000 Champions League	First group stage	(Norway) Rosenborg	1–0	2–2	2nd
1999–2000 Champions League	First group stage	(Portugal) Boavista	1–1	1–1	2nd
1999–2000 Champions League	Second group stage	(England) Chelsea	1–3	1–3	3rd
1999–2000 Champions League	Second group stage	(France) Marseille	3–0	0–0	3rd
1999–2000 Champions League	Second group stage	(Italy) Lazio	0–0	2–1	3rd
2000–01 Champions League	Third qualifying round	(Austria) Sturm Graz	1–1	1–2	2–3
2001–02 Champions League	First group stage	(Russia) Spartak Moscow	2–1	2–2	3rd
2001–02 Champions League	First group stage	(Czech Republic) Sparta Prague	0–2	0–4	3rd
2001–02 Champions League	First group stage	(Germany) Bayern Munich	2–2	1–3	3rd
2001–02 UEFA Cup	Third round	(Germany) SC Freiburg	1–0	2–2	3–2
2001–02 UEFA Cup	Fourth round	(Scotland) Rangers	3–2	1–1	4–3
2001–02 UEFA Cup	Quarter-final	(Netherlands) PSV Eindhoven	1–1 (a.e.t.)	1–1	2–2 (5–4 p)
2001–02 UEFA Cup	Semi-final	(Italy) Inter Milan	2–2	1–0	3–2
2001–02 UEFA Cup	Final	(Germany) Borussia Dortmund	3–2		
2002 UEFA Super Cup		(Spain) Real Madrid	1–3		
2002–03 Champions League	Third qualifying round	(Turkey) Fenerbahçe	1–0	2–0	3–0
2002–03 Champions League	First group stage	(Italy) Juventus	1–1	0–2	4th
2002–03 Champions League	First group stage	(England) Newcastle United	2–3	1–0	4th
2002–03 Champions League	First group stage	(Ukraine) Dynamo Kyiv	0–0	0–2	4th
2003–04 UEFA Cup	First round	(Austria) Kärnten	2–1	1–0	3–1
2003–04 UEFA Cup	Second round	(Czech Republic) Teplice	0–2	1–1	1–3
2004–05 UEFA Cup	First round	(Norway) Odd Grenland	4–1	1–0	5–1
2004–05 UEFA Cup	Group stage	(Scotland) Heart of Midlothian	3–0	—N/a	1st
2004–05 UEFA Cup	Group stage	(Hungary) Ferencváros	—N/a	1–1	1st
2004–05 UEFA Cup	Group stage	(Germany) Schalke 04	2–1	—N/a	1st
2004–05 UEFA Cup	Group stage	(Switzerland) Basel	—N/a	0–1	1st
2004–05 UEFA Cup	Round of 32	(Portugal) Sporting CP	1–2	1–2	2–4
2005–06 UEFA Cup	First round	(Romania) Rapid București	1–1	0–1	1–2
2006–07 UEFA Cup	First round	(Bulgaria) Lokomotiv Sofia	0–0	2–2	2–2 (a)
2006–07 UEFA Cup	Group stage	(Switzerland) Basel	—N/a	1–1	3rd
2006–07 UEFA Cup	Group stage	(England) Blackburn Rovers	0–0	—N/a	3rd
2006–07 UEFA Cup	Group stage	(France) Nancy	—N/a	0–3	3rd
2006–07 UEFA Cup	Group stage	(Poland) Wisła Kraków	3–1	—N/a	3rd
2006–07 UEFA Cup	Round of 32	(England) Tottenham Hotspur	Disqualified (Note: On 19 January 2007, UEFA declared that Feyenoord had been disqualified after a member of their crowd threw a glass of beer at Morten Gamst Pedersen in their group stage match at home to Blackburn Rovers. UEFA announced on 25 January that Tottenham Hotspur had received a bye. This was confirmed after a final appeal.)		
2008–09 UEFA Cup	First round	(Sweden) Kalmar FF	0–1	2–1	2–2 (a)
2008–09 UEFA Cup	Group stage	(France) Nancy	—N/a	0–3	5th
2008–09 UEFA Cup	Group stage	(Russia) CSKA Moscow	1–3	—N/a	5th
2008–09 UEFA Cup	Group stage	(Spain) Deportivo La Coruña	—N/a	0–3	5th
2008–09 UEFA Cup	Group stage	(Poland) Lech Poznań	0–1	—N/a	5th
2010–11 Europa League	Play-off round	(Belgium) Gent	1–0	0–2	1–2
2012–13 Champions League	Third qualifying round	(Ukraine) Dynamo Kyiv	0–1	1–2	1–3
2012–13 Europa League	Play-off round	(Czech Republic) Sparta Prague	2–2	0–2	2–4
2013–14 Europa League	Play-off round	(Russia) Kuban Krasnodar	1–2	0–1	1–3
2014–15 Champions League	Third qualifying round	(Turkey) Beşiktaş	1–2	1–3	2–5
2014–15 UEFA Europa League	Play-off round	(Ukraine) Zorya Luhansk	4–3	1–1	5–4
2014–15 UEFA Europa League	Group stage	(Spain) Sevilla	2–0	0–2	1st
2014–15 UEFA Europa League	Group stage	(Belgium) Standard Liège	2–1	3–0	1st
2014–15 UEFA Europa League	Group stage	(Croatia) Rijeka	2–0	1–3	1st
2014–15 UEFA Europa League	Round of 32	(Italy) Roma	1–2	1–1	2–3
2016–17 Europa League	Group stage	(England) Manchester United	1–0	0–4	3rd
2016–17 Europa League	Group stage	(Turkey) Fenerbahçe	0–1	0–1	3rd
2016–17 Europa League	Group stage	(Ukraine) Zorya Luhansk	1–0	1–1	3rd
2017–18 Champions League	Group stage	(England) Manchester City	0–4	0–1	4th
2017–18 Champions League	Group stage	(Italy) Napoli	2–1	1–3	4th
2017–18 Champions League	Group stage	(Ukraine) Shakhtar Donetsk	1–2	1–3	4th
2018–19 Europa League	Third qualifying round	(Slovakia) Trenčín	1–1	0–4	1–5
2019–20 Europa League	Third qualifying round	(Georgia (country)) Dinamo Tbilisi	4–0	1–1	5–1
2019–20 Europa League	Play-off round	(Israel) Hapoel Be'er Sheva	3–0	3–0	6–0
2019–20 Europa League	Group stage	(Scotland) Rangers	2–2	0–1	4th
2019–20 Europa League	Group stage	(Portugal) Porto	2–0	2–3	4th
2019–20 Europa League	Group stage	(Switzerland) Young Boys	1–1	0–2	4th
2020–21 Europa League	Group stage	(Croatia) Dinamo Zagreb	0–2	0–0	3rd
2020–21 Europa League	Group stage	(Russia) CSKA Moscow	3–1	0–0	3rd
2020–21 Europa League	Group stage	(Austria) Wolfsberger AC	1–4	0–1	3rd
2021–22 Conference League	Second qualifying round	(Kosovo) Drita	3–2	0–0	3–2
2021–22 Conference League	Third qualifying round	(Switzerland) Luzern	3–0	3–0	6–0
2021–22 Conference League	Play-off round	(Sweden) IF Elfsborg	5–0	1–3	6–3
2021–22 Conference League	Group stage	(Israel) Maccabi Haifa	2–1	0–0	1st
2021–22 Conference League	Group stage	(Czech Republic) Slavia Prague	2–1	2–2	1st
2021–22 Conference League	Group stage	(Germany) Union Berlin	3–1	2–1	1st
2021–22 Conference League	Round of 16	(Serbia) Partizan	3–1	5–2	8–3
2021–22 Conference League	Quarter-final	(Czech Republic) Slavia Prague	3–3	3–1	6–4
2021–22 Conference League	Semi-final	(France) Marseille	3–2	0–0	3–2
2021–22 Conference League	Final	(Italy) Roma	0–1		
2022–23 Europa League	Group stage	(Italy) Lazio	1–0	2–4	1st
2022–23 Europa League	Group stage	(Austria) Sturm Graz	6–0	0–1	1st
2022–23 Europa League	Group stage	(Denmark) Midtjylland	2–2	2–2	1st
2022–23 Europa League	Round of 16	(Ukraine) Shakhtar Donetsk	7–1	1–1	8–1
2022–23 Europa League	Quarter-final	(Italy) Roma	1–0	1–4 (a.e.t.)	2–4
2023–24 Champions League	Group stage	(Scotland) Celtic	2–0	1–2	3rd
2023–24 Champions League	Group stage	(Spain) Atlético Madrid	1–3	2–3	3rd
2023–24 Champions League	Group stage	(Italy) Lazio	3–1	0–1	3rd
2023–24 Europa League	Knockout round play-offs	(Italy) Roma	1–1	1–1 (a.e.t.)	2–2 (2–4 p)
2024–25 Champions League	League phase	(Germany) Bayer Leverkusen	0–4	—N/a	19th
2024–25 Champions League	League phase	(Spain) Girona	—N/a	3–2	19th
2024–25 Champions League	League phase	(Portugal) Benfica	—N/a	3–1	19th
2024–25 Champions League	League phase	(Austria) Red Bull Salzburg	1–3	—N/a	19th
2024–25 Champions League	League phase	(England) Manchester City	—N/a	3–3	19th
2024–25 Champions League	League phase	(Czech Republic) Sparta Prague	4–2	—N/a	19th
2024–25 Champions League	League phase	(Germany) Bayern Munich	3–0	—N/a	19th
2024–25 Champions League	League phase	(France) Lille	—N/a	1–6 (Note: This is the most goals conceded by Feyenoord in its UEFA history.)	19th
2024–25 Champions League	Knockout phase play-offs	(Italy) Milan	1–0	1–1	2–1
2024–25 Champions League	Round of 16	(Italy) Inter Milan	0–2	1–2	1–4
2025–26 Champions League	Third qualifying round	(Turkey) Fenerbahçe	2–1	2–5	4–6
2025–26 Europa League	League phase	(Portugal) Braga	—N/a	0–1	29th
2025–26 Europa League	League phase	(England) Aston Villa	0–2	—N/a	29th
2025–26 Europa League	League phase	(Greece) Panathinaikos	3–1	—N/a	29th
2025–26 Europa League	League phase	(Germany) VfB Stuttgart	—N/a	0–2	29th
2025–26 Europa League	League phase	(Scotland) Celtic	1–3	—N/a	29th
2025–26 Europa League	League phase	(Romania) FCSB	—N/a	3–4	29th
2025–26 Europa League	League phase	(Austria) Sturm Graz	3–0	—N/a	29th
2025–26 Europa League	League phase	(Spain) Real Betis	—N/a	1–2	29th
2026–27 Champions League	League phase	(Spain) Barcelona	—N/a	1–5	
2026–27 Champions League	League phase	(Italy) Como	3–2	—N/a	
2026–27 Champions League	League phase	(Spain) Real Betis	—N/a	0–1	
2026–27 Champions League	League phase	(Italy) Inter Milan	0–3	—N/a	
2026–27 Champions League	League phase	(Portugal) Porto		—N/a	
2026–27 Champions League	League phase	(Norway) Viking	—N/a		
2026–27 Champions League	League phase	(Turkey) Galatasaray	—N/a		
2026–27 Champions League	League phase	(Germany) RB Leipzig		—N/a	
UEFA club coefficient: 68.000 (24th) (as per 2024–25 season)

== Intercontinental Cup ==
In addition to the European competitions the club played in, Feyenoord's 1970 victory in the European Cup gave them Europe's place in that year's Intercontinental Cup, played against the winners of the Copa Libertadores.

Season	Round	Opponent	Home	Away	Aggregate
1970 Intercontinental Cup	Final	(Argentina) Estudiantes	1–0	2–2	3–2

== European record ==
=== Record by competition ===
As of 3 November 2026

Competition	Pld	W	D	L	GF	GA	GD	Win%
European Cup/UEFA Champions League	113	43	25	45	185	169	+16	38.05
UEFA Cup/UEFA Europa League	159	63	38	58	243	205	+38	39.62
UEFA Europa Conference League	19	12	5	2	43	21	+22	63.16
European Cup Winners' Cup/UEFA Cup Winners' Cup	36	18	10	8	57	34	+23	50.00
UEFA Super Cup	1	0	0	1	1	3	−2	0.00
Inter-Cities Fairs Cup	2	1	0	1	2	4	−2	50.00
Total	330	137	78	115	531	436	+95	41.52

=== Top goalscorers ===
As of 14 October 2026

Rank	Goals	Player	Date of last goal	Competition
1	19	(Netherlands) Lex Schoenmaker	2 October 1974	1974–75 European Cup
2	18	(Netherlands) Willem van Hanegem	18 September 1974	1974–75 European Cup
3	14	(Netherlands) Theo de Jong	20 October 1976	1976–77 UEFA Cup
4	13	(Mexico) Santiago Giménez	29 January 2025	2024–25 UEFA Champions League
5	11	(Denmark) Jon Dahl Tomasson	8 May 2002	2001–02 UEFA Cup
5	11	(Netherlands) Pierre van Hooijdonk	18 September 2002	2002–03 UEFA Champions League
7	9	(Sweden) Henrik Larsson	15 October 1996	1996–97 UEFA Cup
8	8	(Netherlands) Jean-Paul van Gastel	15 September 1998	1998–99 UEFA Cup
8	8	(Sweden) Ove Kindvall	6 May 1970	1969–70 European Cup
10	7	(Iran) Alireza Jahanbakhsh	19 September 2023	2023–24 UEFA Champions League
10	7	(Netherlands) Frans Bouwmeester	8 May 1963	1962–63 European Cup
10	7	(Algeria) Anis Hadj Moussa	14 October 2026	2026–27 UEFA Champions League
10	7	(Colombia) Luis Sinisterra	28 April 2022	2021–22 UEFA Europa Conference League
10	7	(Netherlands) Regi Blinker	2 November 1995	1995–96 UEFA Cup Winners' Cup
15	6	(Austria) Franz Hasil	25 October 1972	1972–73 UEFA Cup
15	6	(Netherlands) Guus Til	5 August 2021	2021–22 UEFA Europa Conference League
15	6	(Denmark) Ivan Nielsen	19 October 1983	1983–84 UEFA Cup
15	6	(Argentina) Julio Cruz	26 November 1997	1997–98 UEFA Champions League
15	6	(Netherlands) Rinus Bennaars	12 December 1962	1962–63 European Cup
15	6	(Netherlands) Ruud Geels	30 September 1969	1969–70 European Cup
15	6	(Austria) Wilhelm Kreuz	8 December 1976	1976–77 UEFA Cup

=== Opponents by country ===
As of 3 November 2026

Nation	Pld	W	D	L	GF	GA	Opponents
Albania	2	1	1	0	1	0	Partizani (2)
Austria	12	4	2	6	17	17	Red Bull Salzburg (1), Kärnten (2), Rapid Wien (2), Sturm Graz (5), Wolfsberger AC (2)
Belgium	8	4	1	3	10	8	Gent (2), Molenbeek (2), Standard Liège (4)
Bulgaria	4	1	2	1	8	5	Lokomotiv Sofia (2), Slavia Sofia (2)
Croatia	4	1	1	2	3	5	Dinamo Zagreb (2), Rijeka (2)
Cyprus	2	2	0	0	17	0	Olympiakos Nicosia (2)
Czech Republic	11	3	4	4	17	22	Sparta Prague (5), Slavia Prague (4), Teplice (2)
Denmark	4	2	2	0	7	5	Hvidovre (2), Midtjylland (2)
England	28	8	6	15	26	48	Aston Villa (1), Blackburn Rovers (1), Chelsea (2), Everton (4), Ipswich Town (2), Manchester City (3), Manchester United (4), Newcastle United (4), Tottenham Hotspur (8)
Finland	4	4	0	0	15	6	Ilves (2), Jazz (2)
France	11	3	5	3	12	18	Lille (1), Marseille (4), Monaco (2), Nancy (2), Reims (2)
Georgia (Note: Includes a team from former Soviet Union.)	4	2	1	1	7	4	Dinamo Tbilisi (4)
Germany (Note: Teams of former East Germany are included.)	35	16	9	10	55	54	Bayer Leverkusen (3), Bayern Munich (3), Borussia Dortmund (3), Borussia Mönchengladbach (4), Dynamo Dresden (2) (Note: Team of former East Germany), Eintracht Frankfurt (2), SC Freiburg (2), 1. FC Kaiserslautern (2), Schalke 04 (1), VfB Stuttgart (7), Union Berlin (2), Vorwärts Berlin (2), Werder Bremen (2)
Greece	3	1	1	1	4	3	Panathinaikos (3)
Hungary	6	2	3	1	7	5	Ferencváros (1), Pécs (2), Vasas (3)
Iceland	4	3	0	1	19	3	ÍA (2), KR (2)
Israel	6	4	1	1	10	3	Hapoel Be'er Sheva (2), Hapoel Petah Tikva (2), Maccabi Haifa (2)
Italy	29	10	7	12	32	42	Como (1), Inter Milan (5), Juventus (4), Lazio (6), Milan (4), Napoli (2), Roma (7)
Kosovo	2	1	1	0	3	2	Drita (2)
Latvia	2	2	0	0	13	0	DAG-Liepaya (2)
Lithuania	2	1	1	0	3	2	Žalgiris Vilnius (2)
Luxembourg	4	4	0	0	31	2	Spora Luxembourg (2), US Rumelange (2)
Netherlands	2	0	2	0	2	2	PSV Eindhoven (2)
Northern Ireland	2	2	0	0	11	1	Coleraine (2)
Norway	4	3	1	0	8	3	Odd Grenland (2), Rosenborg (2)
Poland	10	5	3	2	15	7	Gwardia Warsaw (2), Lech Poznań (1), Legia Warsaw (2), Ruch Chorzów (2), Szombierki Bytom (2), Wisła Kraków (1)
Portugal	16	4	4	8	17	24	Benfica (5), Boavista (2), Braga (1), Porto (4), Sporting CP (4)
Romania	7	2	3	2	10	7	Dinamo București (2), Rapid București (2), UTA Arad (2), FCSB (1)
Russia	11	3	3	5	12	15	CSKA Moscow (3), Kuban Krasnodar (2), Spartak Moscow (6)
Scotland	13	7	2	4	20	14	Aberdeen (2), Celtic (4), Heart of Midlothian (1), Rangers (4), St Mirren (2)
Serbia (Note: Teams of former Yugoslavia are included)	6	4	0	2	14	10	OFK Beograd (2) (Note: Team of former Yugoslavia), Partizan (2), Radnički Niš (2)
Slovakia	4	2	1	1	4	5	Košice (2), Trenčín (2)
Spain	22	7	2	13	22	40	Atlético Madrid (2), Barcelona (3), Deportivo La Coruña (1), Espanyol (4), Girona (1), Real Betis (2), Real Madrid (3), Sevilla (2), Tenerife (2), Zaragoza (2)
Sweden	12	8	1	3	33	12	Djurgården (2), Elfsborg (2), IFK Göteborg (2), Kalmar (2), Malmö FF (2), Öster (2)
Switzerland	13	5	4	4	19	12	Basel (2), Luzern (4), Servette (3), Sion (2), Young Boys (2)
Turkey	8	3	0	5	9	13	Beşiktaş (2), Fenerbahçe (6)
Ukraine	12	3	4	5	18	17	Dynamo Kyiv (4), Shakhtar Donetsk (4), Zorya Luhansk (4)

=== Most frequent opponents ===
As of 6 November 2025

Rank	Club	Pld	W	D	L	GF	GA	Last match
1	(England) Tottenham Hotspur	8	2	3	3	9	12	1991–92 European Cup Winners' Cup
2	(Italy) Roma	7	1	3	3	6	10	2023–24 UEFA Europa League
2	(Germany) VfB Stuttgart	7	3	1	3	9	12	2025–26 UEFA Europa League
4	(Turkey) Fenerbahçe	6	3	0	3	7	8	2025–26 UEFA Champions League
4	(Italy) Lazio	6	3	1	2	8	7	2023–24 UEFA Champions League
4	(Russia) Spartak Moscow	6	2	2	2	8	8	2001–02 UEFA Champions League

=== European finals ===
Year	Competition	Opponent	Score	Venue
1970	European Cup	(Scotland) Celtic	2–1 (a.e.t.)	(Italy) San Siro, Milan
1974	UEFA Cup	(England) Tottenham Hotspur	2–2	(England) White Hart Lane, London
1974	UEFA Cup	(England) Tottenham Hotspur	2–0 (4–2 agg.)	(Netherlands) De Kuip, Rotterdam
2002	UEFA Cup	(Germany) Borussia Dortmund	3–2	(Netherlands) De Kuip, Rotterdam
2002	UEFA Super Cup	(Spain) Real Madrid	1–3	Stade Louis II, Monaco
2022	UEFA Europa Conference League	(Italy) Roma	0–1	(Albania) Arena Kombëtare, Tirana
