= Rinus Israël =

Dutch football player and manager (1942–2025)

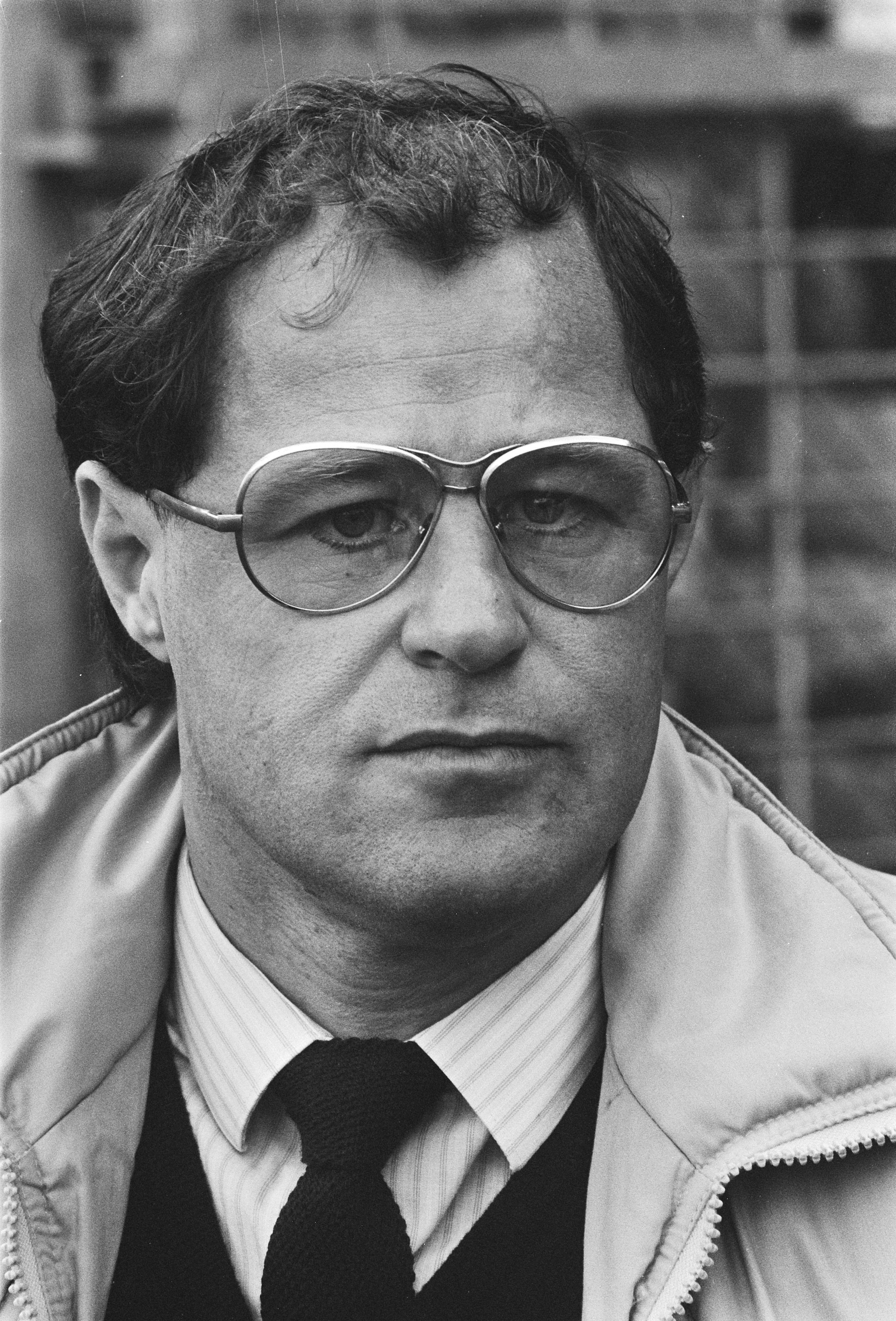
- Israël in 1982

Personal information
- Full name: Marinus David Israël
- Date of birth: 19 March 1942
- Place of birth: Amsterdam, German-occupied Netherlands
- Date of death: 1 July 2025 (aged 83)
- Position: Defender

Youth career
- DWV
- DWS

Senior career*
Years	Team	Apps	(Gls)
1962–1966	DWS	88	(1)
1966–1974	Feyenoord	219	(21)
1974–1975	Excelsior	32	(2)
1975–1982	PEC Zwolle	198	(16)
Total		537	(40)

International career
1964–1974	Netherlands	47	(3)

Managerial career
- 1982–1984: PEC Zwolle (assistant)
- 1984–1986: FC Den Bosch
- 1986–1988: Feyenoord
- 1988–1989: PAOK
- 1989–1990: FC Den Bosch
- 1990–1992: FC Dinamo București
- 1992–1997: Netherlands U21
- 1997–1998: Ghana
- 1998–1999: Al-Jazira Club
- 1999–2000: Al-Shabab
- 2000–2001: Al-Wahda FC
- 2001–2003: ADO Den Haag
- 2003–2004: Al-Wahda FC
- 2010–2012: VV Young Boys
Medal record
Representing Netherlands
FIFA World Cup
Runner-up	1974 West Germany
- * Club domestic league appearances and goals

Marinus David “Rinus” Israël (19 March 1942 – 1 July 2025) was a Dutch professional football player and manager. Nicknamed "Iron Rinus" (or IJzeren Rinus in Dutch), he formed a solid defence line at Feyenoord with Theo Laseroms, nicknamed "Theo the Tank" (Theo de Tank).

Israël was the grandfather of handball player Rachel de Haze.

== Club career ==
During his career he played for DWS (1962–66), Feyenoord Rotterdam (1966–74), Excelsior Rotterdam (1974–75) and PEC Zwolle (1975–82).

Israël achieved his greatest success at club level with Feyenoord, where he won three Eredivisie titles, a KNVB Cup, a European Cup and a UEFA Cup. He scored one of Feyenoord's two goals in the 1970 European Cup Final against Celtic and gave the long range pass on Ove Kindvall who made the winning goal in extra time.

== International career ==
Israël played 47 matches and scored 3 goals for the Netherlands national team from 1964 to 1974, and he played three matches for the Netherlands in the 1974 FIFA World Cup, including the second-round victories against Brazil and Argentina.

== Death ==
Israël died on 1 July 2025, at the age of 83.

== Career statistics ==
=== International ===
Appearances and goals by national team and year
National team	Year	Apps	Goals
Netherlands	1964	3	0
Netherlands	1965	5	0
Netherlands	1966	5	0
Netherlands	1967	6	1
Netherlands	1968	6	0
Netherlands	1969	6	0
Netherlands	1970	5	0
Netherlands	1971	4	1
Netherlands	1972	2	1
Netherlands	1973	1	0
Netherlands	1974	4	0
Total		47	3

Scores and results list the Netherlands' goal tally first, score column indicates score after each Israël goal.

List of international goals scored by Rinus Israël
No.	Date	Venue	Opponent	Score	Result	Competition
1	4 October 1967	Københavns Idrætspark, Copenhagen, Denmark	Denmark	2–3	2–3	UEFA Euro 1968 qualification
2	11 October 1970	De Kuip, Rotterdam, Netherlands	Yugoslavia	1–1	1–1	UEFA Euro 1972 qualification
3	17 November 1971	Philips Stadion, Eindhoven, Netherlands	Luxembourg	8–0	8–0	UEFA Euro 1972 qualification

== Honours ==
=== Player ===
DWS

- Eerste Divisie: 1962–63
- Eredivisie: 1963–64

Feijenoord

- Eredivisie: 1968–69, 1970–71, 1973–74
- KNVB Cup: 1968–69
- Intercontinental Cup: 1970
- European Cup: 1969–70
- UEFA Cup: 1973–74

Netherlands

- FIFA World Cup runner-up: 1974

Individual

- Dutch Footballer of the Year: 1971, 1975

=== Manager ===
FC Dinamo București

- Liga I: 1991-92

Al-Wahda FC

- UAE League: 2000–01

ADO Den Haag

- Eerste Divisie: 2002–03
