= Theo van Duivenbode =

Dutch footballer (born 1943)

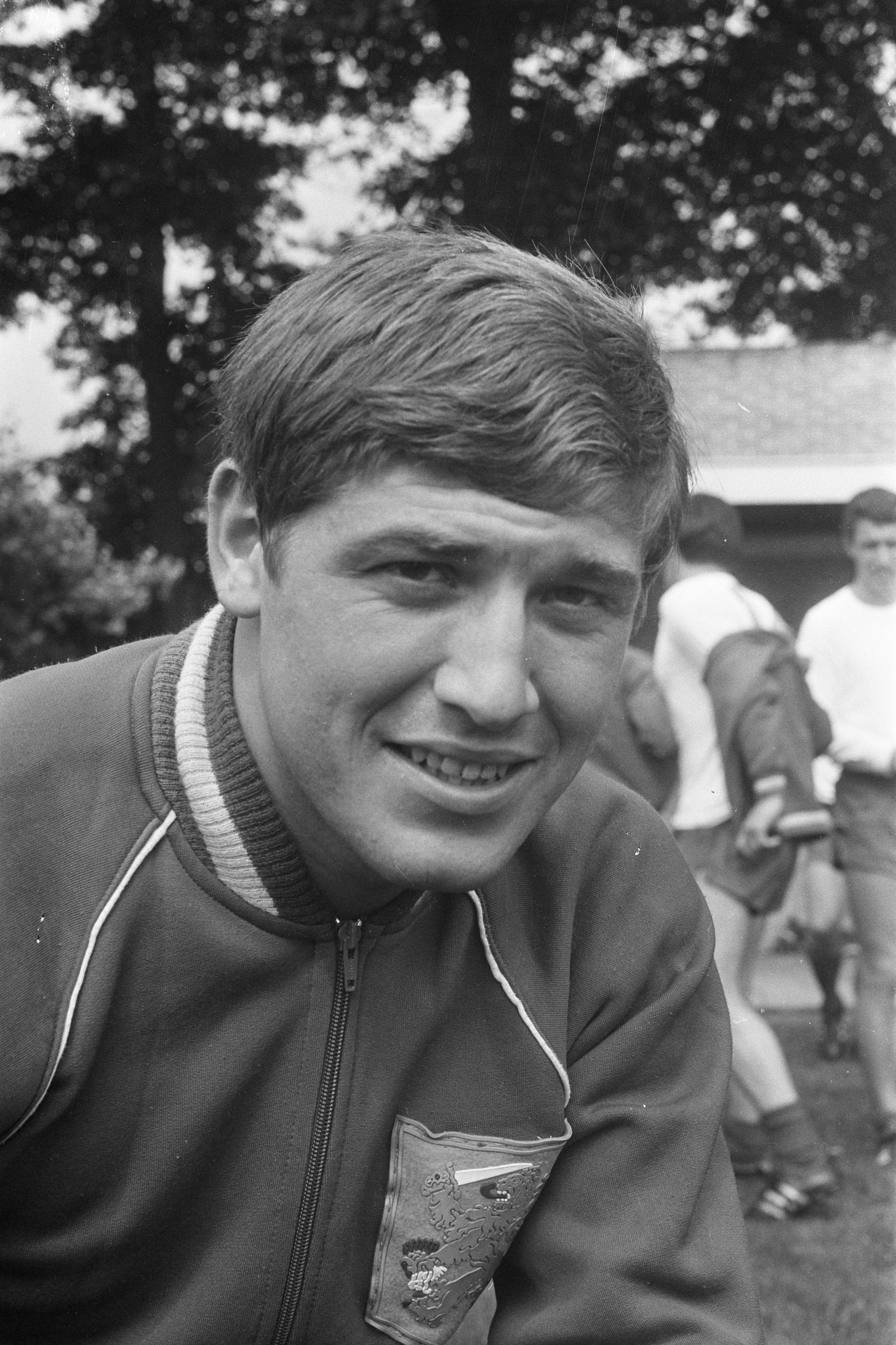
- Van Duivenbode in 1968

Personal information
- Full name: Theodorus van Duivenbode
- Date of birth: 1 November 1943 (age 82)
- Place of birth: Amsterdam, Netherlands
- Position: Left-back

Youth career
- DWS
- –1964: VVA/Spartaan

Senior career*
Years	Team	Apps	(Gls)
1964–1969	Ajax	135	(6)
1969–1973	Feyenoord	83	(1)
1973–1974	Haarlem	46	(0)
Total		264	(7)

International career
1968–1970	Netherlands	5	(0)
- * Club domestic league appearances and goals

Theo van Duivenbode (born 1 November 1943) is a Dutch former footballer who played for Ajax and Feyenoord and was part of their European and Intercontinental Cup victory in 1970.

== Club career ==
Born in Amsterdam, van Duivenbode started at local side DWS and made his senior professional debut on 3 May 1964 for hometown club Ajax against Sparta, but was deemed not hard enough by manager Rinus Michels after they lost the 1969 European Cup Final to Milan. He subsequently left the club for arch rivals Feyenoord, with whom he did win international silverware. He was the third Ajax player in history to join Feyenoord after Eddy Pieters Graafland and Henk Groot and also scored the only goal in his first Klassieker in a Feyenoord-shirt, on 2 November 1969.

He finished his career at Haarlem, his final game was in December 1974 against Excelsior.

== International career ==
Van Duivenbode made his debut for the Netherlands in a September 1968 FIFA World Cup qualification match against Luxembourg and earned a total of five caps, scoring no goals. His final international was an October 1970 UEFA Euro qualification match against Yugoslavia.

== Personal life ==
After retiring as a player he became a successful businessman and was a commercial director at insurance company Stad Rotterdam Verzekeringen, who had been shirtsponsoring Feyenoord.

=== Football administration ===
Van Duivenbode worked for Ajax in different positions and also was a member of the board at the KNVB. As of 2017, he has a seat in the Board of Supervisors of Ajax.

== Honours ==
Ajax

- Eredivisie: 1965–66, 1966–67, 1967–68
- KNVB Cup: 1966–67

Feyenoord

- Eredivisie: 1970–71
- European Cup: 1969–70
- Intercontinental Cup: 1970
