= Evan Williams (footballer) =

Scottish footballer (1943–2025)

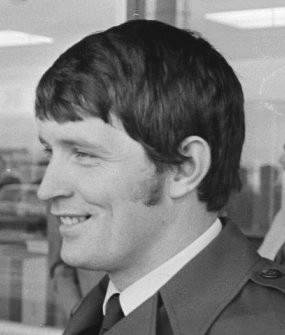
- Williams in 1971

Personal information
- Full name: Evan Samuel Williams
- Date of birth: 15 July 1943
- Place of birth: Dumbarton, Scotland
- Date of death: 20 February 2025 (aged 81)
- Position: Goalkeeper

Youth career
- Vale of Leven

Senior career*
Years	Team	Apps	(Gls)
1963–1964	East Fife (trialist)	2	(0)
1964–1966	Third Lanark		
1966–1969	Wolverhampton Wanderers	13	(0)
1969	→ Aston Villa (loan)	12	(0)
1969–1974	Celtic	82	(0)
1974–1975	Clyde	21	(0)
1975–1976	Stranraer	1	(0)
Total		131	(0)

Managerial career
- Vale of Leven
- 2001–2003: Ardeer Thistle
- * Club domestic league appearances and goals

Evan Samuel Williams (15 July 1943 – 20 February 2025) was a Scottish footballer who played as a goalkeeper for Third Lanark, Wolverhampton Wanderers, Aston Villa, Celtic, Clyde and Stranraer. Williams was also manager of Vale of Leven, where he lived.

The largest part of his playing career was at Celtic, for whom he made 82 league appearances between 1969 and 1973. Williams played in the 1970 European Cup Final, which Celtic lost 2–1 to Feyenoord. Evan was named man of the match in the final even though on the losing team.

Williams died on 20 February 2025, at the age of 81.
