= Coen Moulijn =

Dutch footballer

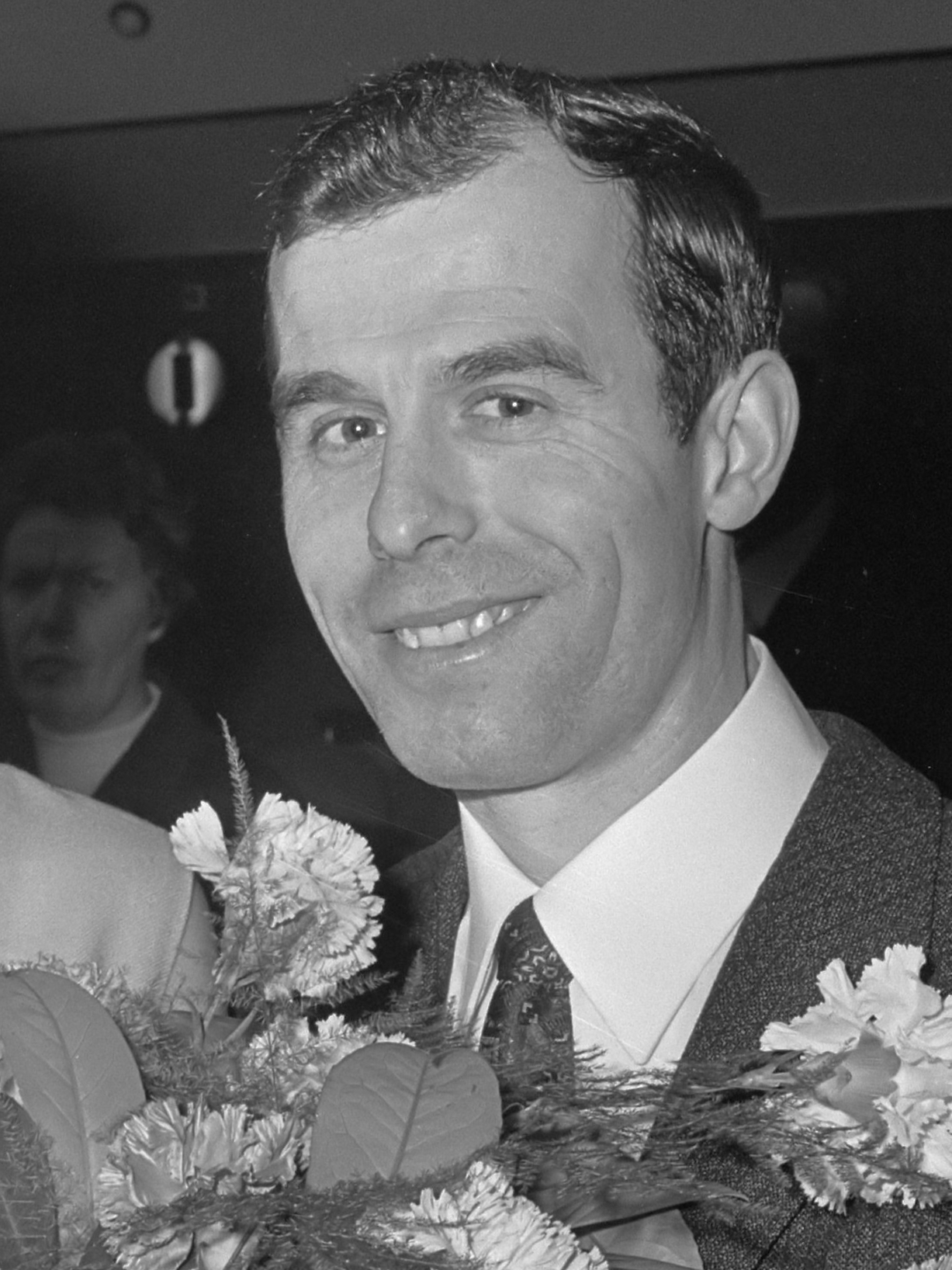
- Coen Moulijn in 1968

Personal information
- Full name: Coenraadt Moulijn
- Date of birth: 15 February 1937
- Place of birth: Rotterdam, Netherlands
- Date of death: 4 January 2011 (aged 73)
- Place of death: Rotterdam, Netherlands
- Height: 1.72 m (5 ft 8 in)
- Position: Left winger

Youth career
- Xerxes

Senior career*
Years	Team	Apps	(Gls)
1954–1955	Xerxes	38	(4)
1955–1972	Feyenoord	487	(84)
Total		525	(88)

International career
1956–1969	Netherlands	38	(4)
- * Club domestic league appearances and goals

Coenraadt "Coen" Moulijn (15 February 1937 – 4 January 2011) was a Dutch professional footballer. He spent nearly his entire club career with Feyenoord, winning several trophies. He also played for the Netherlands national team.

== Club career ==
Compared to Stanley Matthews and Garrincha, Moulijn was considered one of the most talented leftwingers in Dutch football history. Johan Cruyff added him to his alltime favorite Dutch national team, stating that "Coen mastered one movement better than anyone: threatening to pass his opponent through the center, and then speeding past him on the other side. He was an exceptionally talented football player. A typical product of the Dutch school."

Hans Kraay was a tough defender in Feyenoord in those days. "Coen was unique. Coaches tried to tell him how to play but he’d shrug and do his own thing. Like Messi. He played on intuition. His move to the inside was unique. He was able to make the opponent stand stiff like a puppet and he’d race past him. He didn’t look like much though. When I saw him first up close I didn’t even recognize him. He looked like an accountant."

Rinus Israël: "He was a modest, hardworking man. I think the fans loved him because of that too. Whenever Coen would have ball possession, people would get religious experiences. I think he was the best Feyenoord player ever."

Wim Jansen: "Coen was tremendous. I dare to say that in pure football skills he was as good as Johan Cruyff. Johan was a leader and would impact the whole team, whereas Coen was an individual player, but man oh man, was he good."

Moulijn played over 400 matches from the 1950s to the 1970s as a left winger for Rotterdam-based club Feyenoord. He starred when the team won both the European Cup and the Intercontinental Cup in 1970. He earned 38 caps and scored 4 goals for the Netherlands national football team.

== Personal life ==
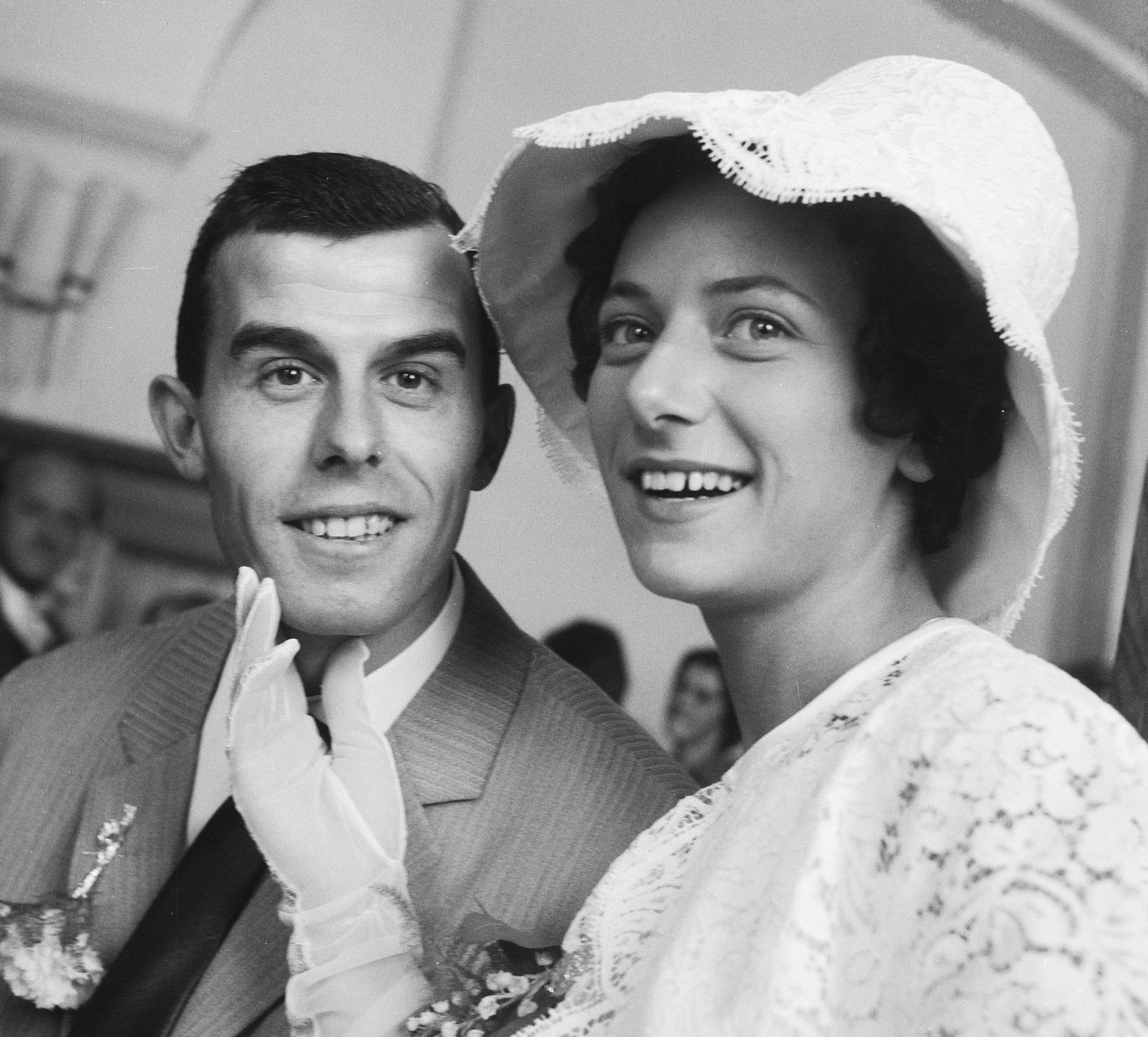
Coen Moulijn and his wife Lenie Waterreu on their wedding day

As a child, Moulijn lived on the same street (Bloklandstraat) as Feyenoord teammate Wim Jansen. On 28 July 1961, he married Lenie Waterreus.

On New Year's Day 2011, Moulijn suffered a cerebral infarction. He died three days later.

== Honours ==
Feyenoord

- European Cup: 1969–70
- Intercontinental Cup: 1970
- Eredivisie: 1960–61, 1961–62, 1964–65, 1968–69, 1970–71
- KNVB Cup: 1964–65, 1968–69
