= Joop van Daele =

Dutch footballer and manager (1947–2025)

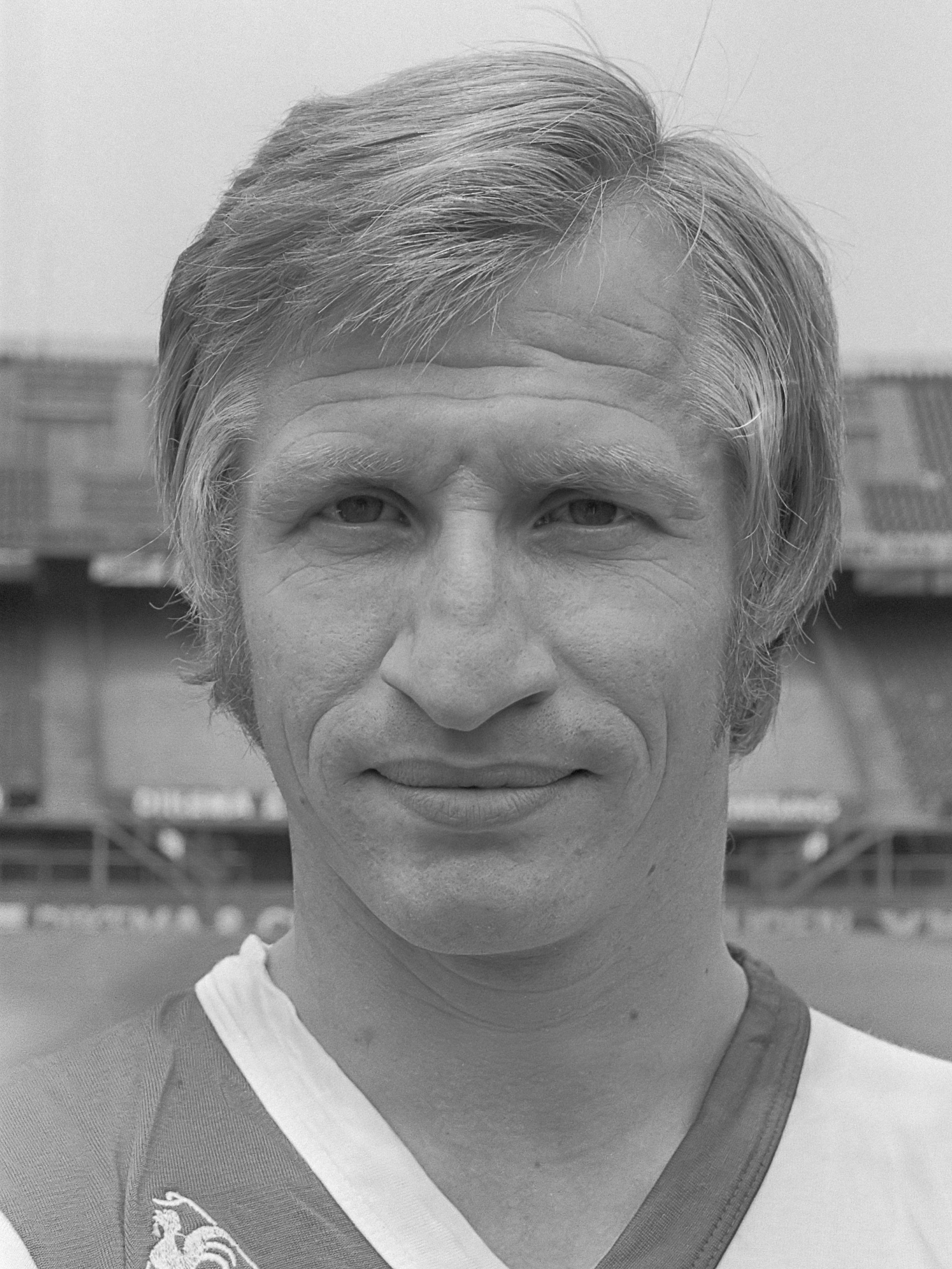
- van Daele in 1976

Personal information
- Full name: Johannes Cornelis van Daele
- Date of birth: 14 August 1947
- Place of birth: Rotterdam, Netherlands
- Date of death: 7 May 2025 (aged 77)
- Position: Defender

Youth career
- RVAV Overmaas
- Feyenoord

Senior career*
Years	Team	Apps	(Gls)
1967–1977	Feyenoord	144	(6)
1976	→ Go Ahead Eagles (loan)	9	(1)
1977–1980	Fortuna SC	102	(4)
1980–1981	Excelsior	28	(5)
Total		283	(16)

Managerial career
- 1978–1980: Fortuna Sittard (assistant)
- 1980–1993: Excelsior (assistant)
- 1984–1988: Papendrecht
- 1988–1990: Excelsior
- * Club domestic league appearances and goals

Johannes Cornelis "Joop" van Daele (14 August 1947 – 7 May 2025) was a Dutch footballer who played as a defender.

== Playing career ==
Van Daele was born in Rotterdam. He joined the Feijenoord youth set-up in 1960 from local amateurs Overmaas and stayed with the Rotterdam giants until 1977. In 1970, he won the European Cup and the Intercontinental Cup. He scored the winning goal in the homematch, the return final of the latter tournament, against Estudiantes.

He also had a short loan spell at Go Ahead Eagles and played for Fortuna Sittard before finishing his career at Excelsior.

=== "Het brilletje van Van Daele" ===
He claimed his name in the history books during the second leg of the 1970 Intercontinental Cup Final against tough-tackling Estudiantes in Rotterdam. Van Daele scored the winning goal and during the goal celebrations his glasses were ripped off by the Argentinians and allegedly smashed to pieces on the pitch by Carlos Pachamé. The incident prompted Toon Hermans to write a song about it and it was recorded by actor Luc Lutz after van Daele declined to sing it himself. Johnny Hoes also released a single with Van Daele de klusjesman (Van Daele the handyman) on the one side and Waar is de bril van Joop van Daele (Where are Joop van Daele's glasses?) on the other.

== Managerial career ==
After retiring as a player, van Daele was assistant manager at former clubs Fortuna and Excelsior before appointed manager at amateur side Papendrecht and as head coach at Excelsior.

In 2006, he was appointed scout at Feyenoord.

== Death ==
Van Daele died on 7 May 2025, at the age of 77.

== Honours ==
=== Player ===
Feijenoord

- Intercontinental Cup: 1970
- European Cup: 1970
- UEFA Cup: 1974
- Eredivisie: 1968–69, 1970–71, 1973–74,
- KNVB Cup : 1968–69
