= 1970 Intercontinental Cup =

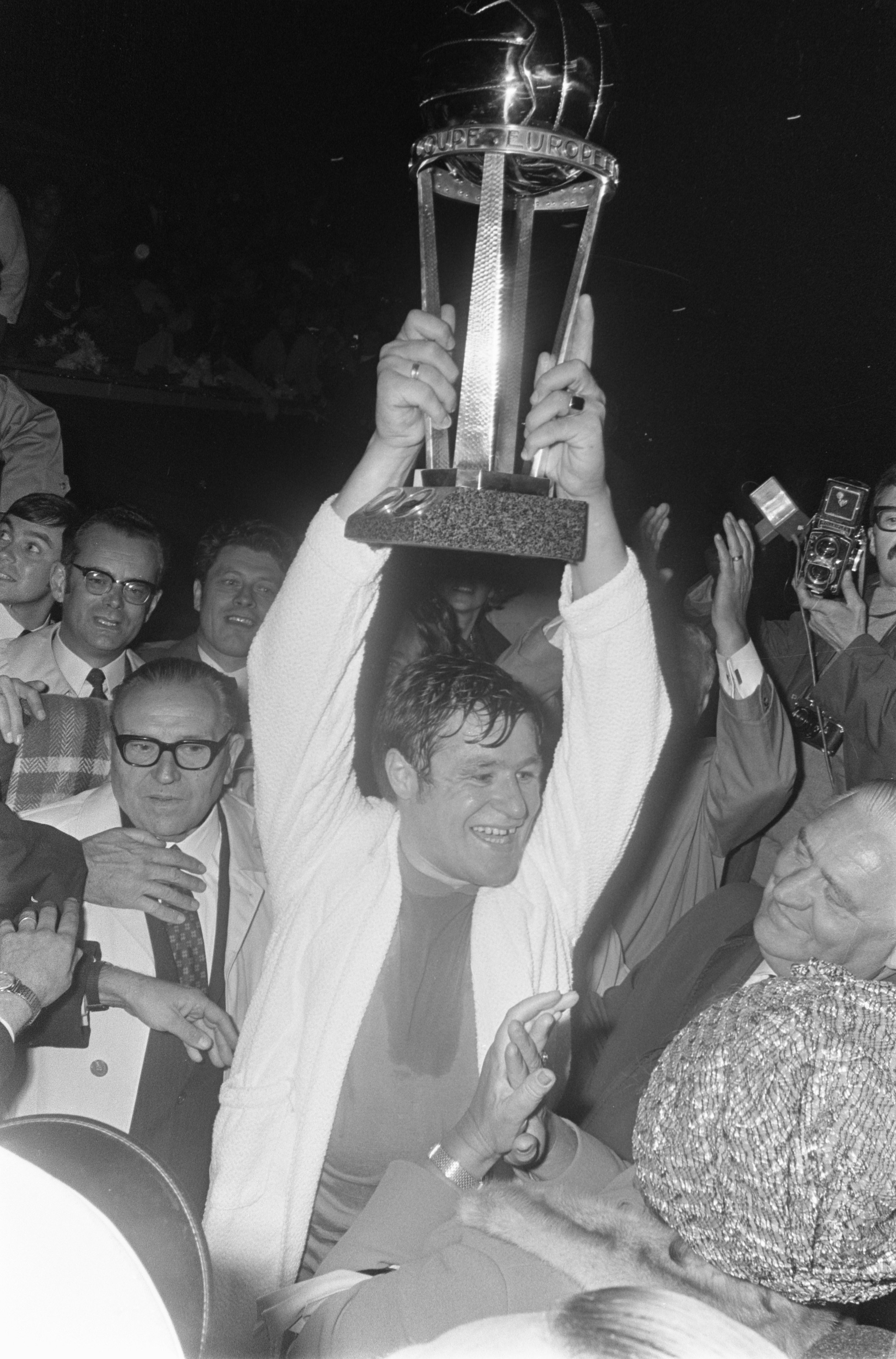
- Feyenoord, champions
Estudiantes (LP)	Feyenoord
(Argentina)	(Netherlands)
2	3
- on aggregate

First leg
Estudiantes (LP)	Feyenoord
2	2
- Date: 26 August 1970
- Venue: La Bombonera, Buenos Aires
- Referee: Rudi Glöckner (East Germany)
- Attendance: 50,500

Second leg
Feyenoord	Estudiantes (LP)
1	0
- Date: 9 September 1970
- Venue: De Kuip, Rotterdam
- Referee: Alberto Tejada Burga (Peru)
- Attendance: 63,475

The 1970 Intercontinental Cup was a football tie held over two legs in August and September 1970 between the winners of the 1969–70 European Cup, Feyenoord, and winners of the 1970 Copa Libertadores, Estudiantes de La Plata.

The first leg was held on 26 August 1970 at La Bombonera in Buenos Aires, and ended in a 2–2 draw, with goals from Juan Echecopar and Juan Ramón Verón for Estudiantes and Willem van Hanegem and Ove Kindvall for Feyenoord. The return leg was held on 9 September 1970 at De Kuip in Rotterdam, which Feyenoord won 1–0 through a goal by Joop van Daele.

This was the first Intercontinental Cup title for Feyenoord in their first final appearance. Feyenoord never reached the Intercontinental Cup final again before the competition was made defunct in 2004 and merged into today's FIFA Club World Cup. On the other hand, this was the third consecutive final appearance for Estudiantes, having won in 1968 and lost in 1969.

== Qualified teams ==
Team	Qualification	Previous finals app.
(Netherlands) Feyenoord	1969–70 European Cup champion	None
(Argentina) Estudiantes de La Plata	1970 Copa Libertadores champion	**1968**, 1969

Bold indicates winning years

== Venues ==
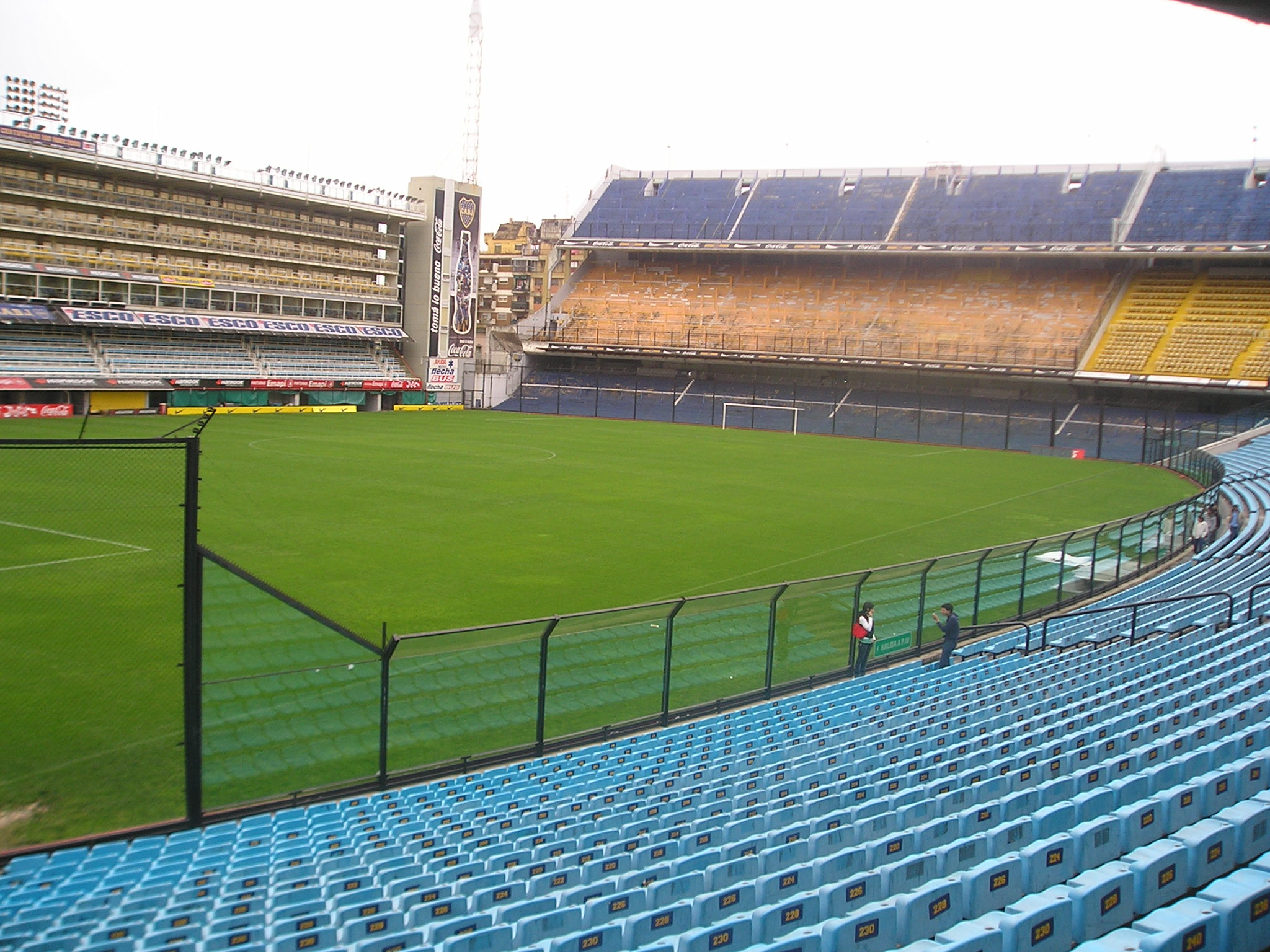
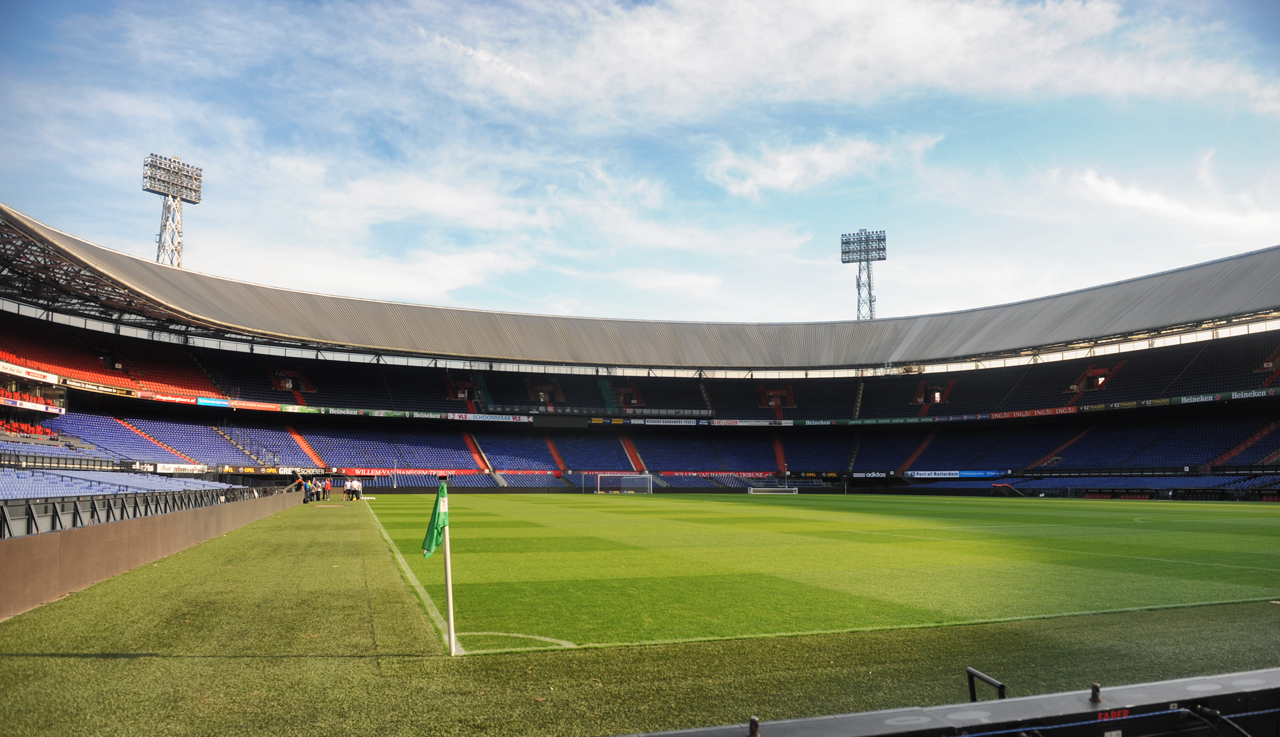
La Bombonera (left) and Feyenoord Stadion, venues for the series

== Match details ==
=== First leg ===
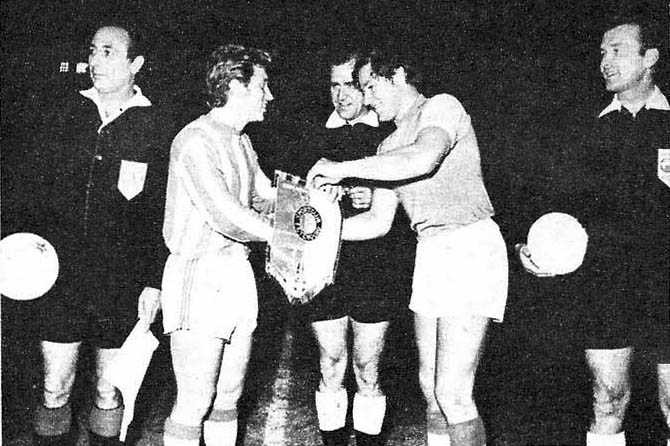
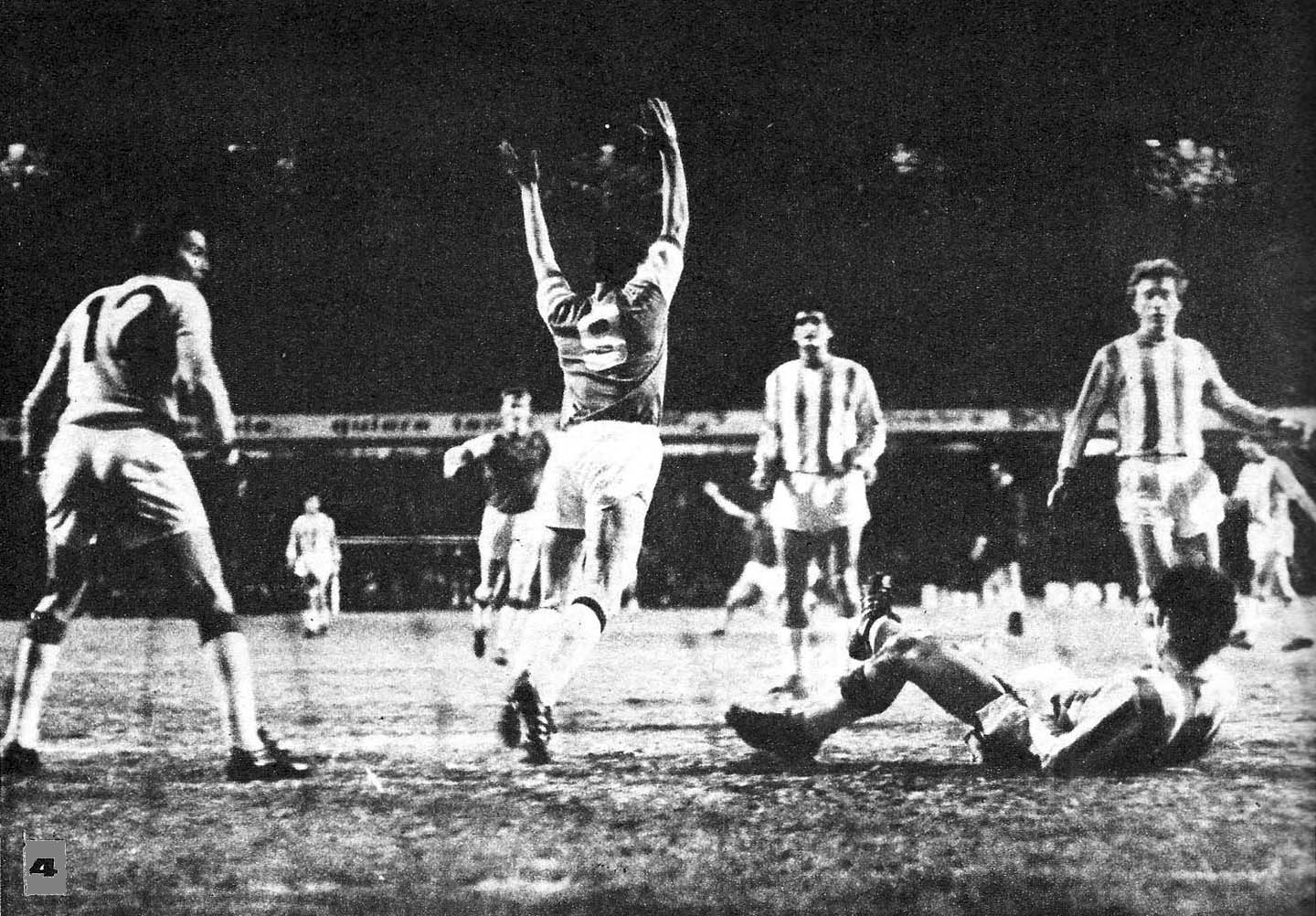
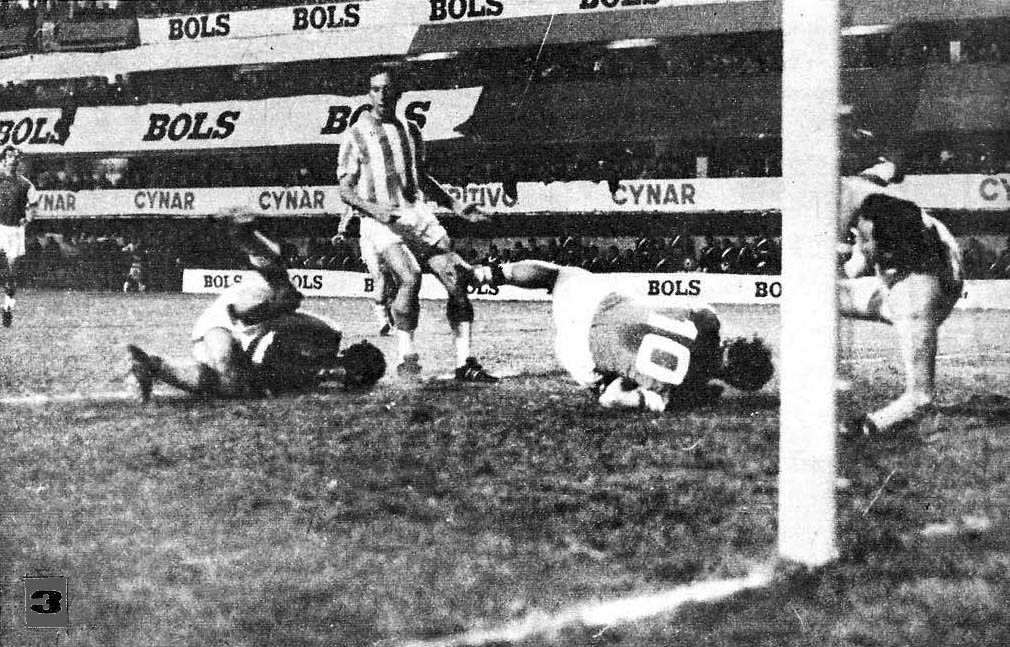
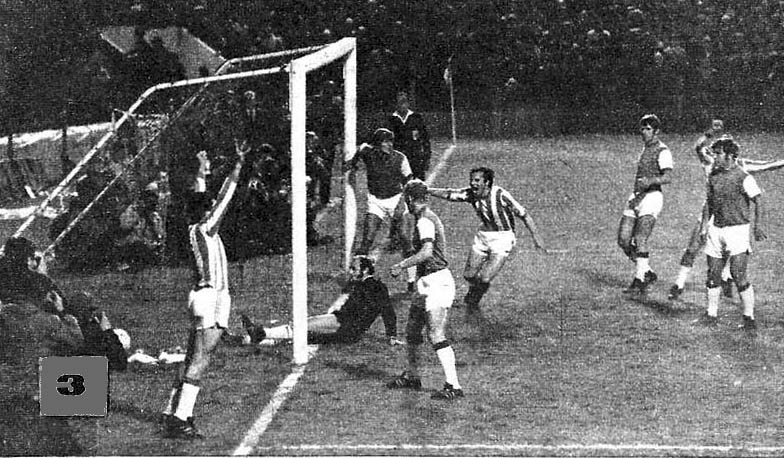
Several moments of the match played at La Bombonera; Estudiantes led 2–0, but Feyenoord reacted and achieved a draw
1970 Intercontinental Cup
26 August 1970
First leg

Estudiantes LP (Argentina)	2–2	(Netherlands) Feyenoord
Echecopar 6'; Verón 12'	Report	Van Hanegem 21'; Kindvall 67'

La Bombonera, Buenos Aires
Attendance: 50,500
Referee: Rudi Glöckner (East Germany)

**Estudiantes LP**	**Feyenoord**

GK	12	(Argentina) Néstor Errea
RB	4	(Argentina) Rubén Pagnanini
CB	2	(Argentina) Hugo Spadaro
CB	3	(Argentina) Néstor Togneri
LB	6	(Argentina) Oscar Malbernat (c)
MF	8	(Argentina) Carlos Bilardo	(substituted off) 84'
MF	5	(Argentina) Carlos Pachamé
MF	10	(Argentina) Juan Echecopar	(substituted off) 84'
FW	7	(Argentina) Marcos Conigliaro
FW	9	(Argentina) Eduardo Flores
FW	11	(Argentina) Juan Ramón Verón
Substitutes:
MF	15	(Argentina) Jorge Solari	(substituted on) 84'
FW	14	(Argentina) Christian Rudzki	(substituted on) 84'
Manager:
(Argentina) Osvaldo Zubeldía

GK	1	(Netherlands) Eddy Treijtel
RB	2	(Netherlands) Piet Romeijn
SW	3	(Netherlands) Rinus Israël
CB	4	(Netherlands) Theo Laseroms
LB	5	(Netherlands) Theo van Duivenbode
CM	6	(Austria) Franz Hasil
CM	7	(Netherlands) Wim Jansen (c)
CM	10	(Netherlands) Willem van Hanegem	(substituted off) 73'
RW	8	(Netherlands) Henk Wery
CF	9	(Sweden) Ove Kindvall
LW	11	(Netherlands) Coen Moulijn
Substitutes:
CM	12	(Netherlands) Johan Boskamp	(substituted on) 73'
Manager:
(Austria) Ernst Happel

=== Second leg ===
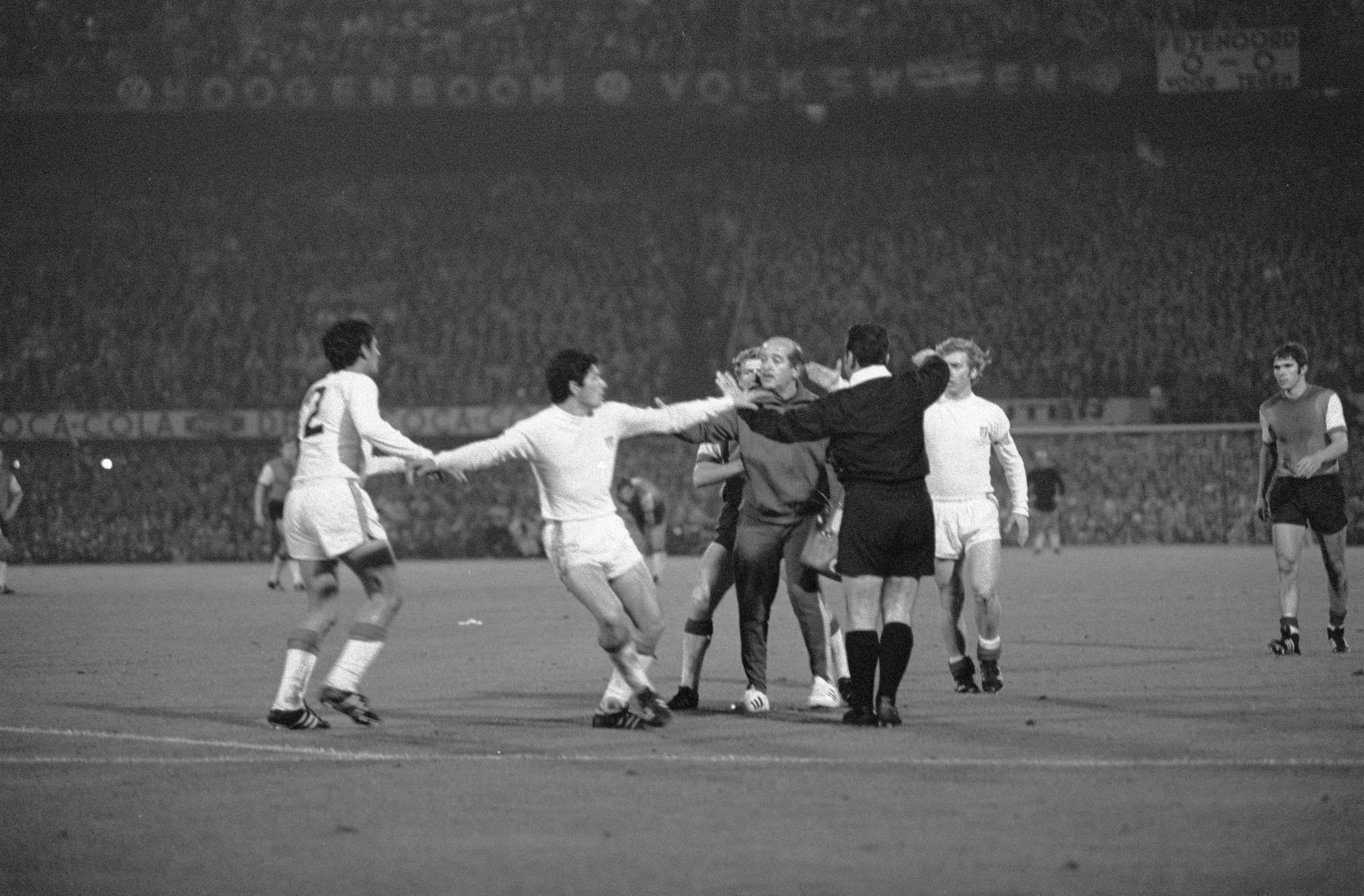
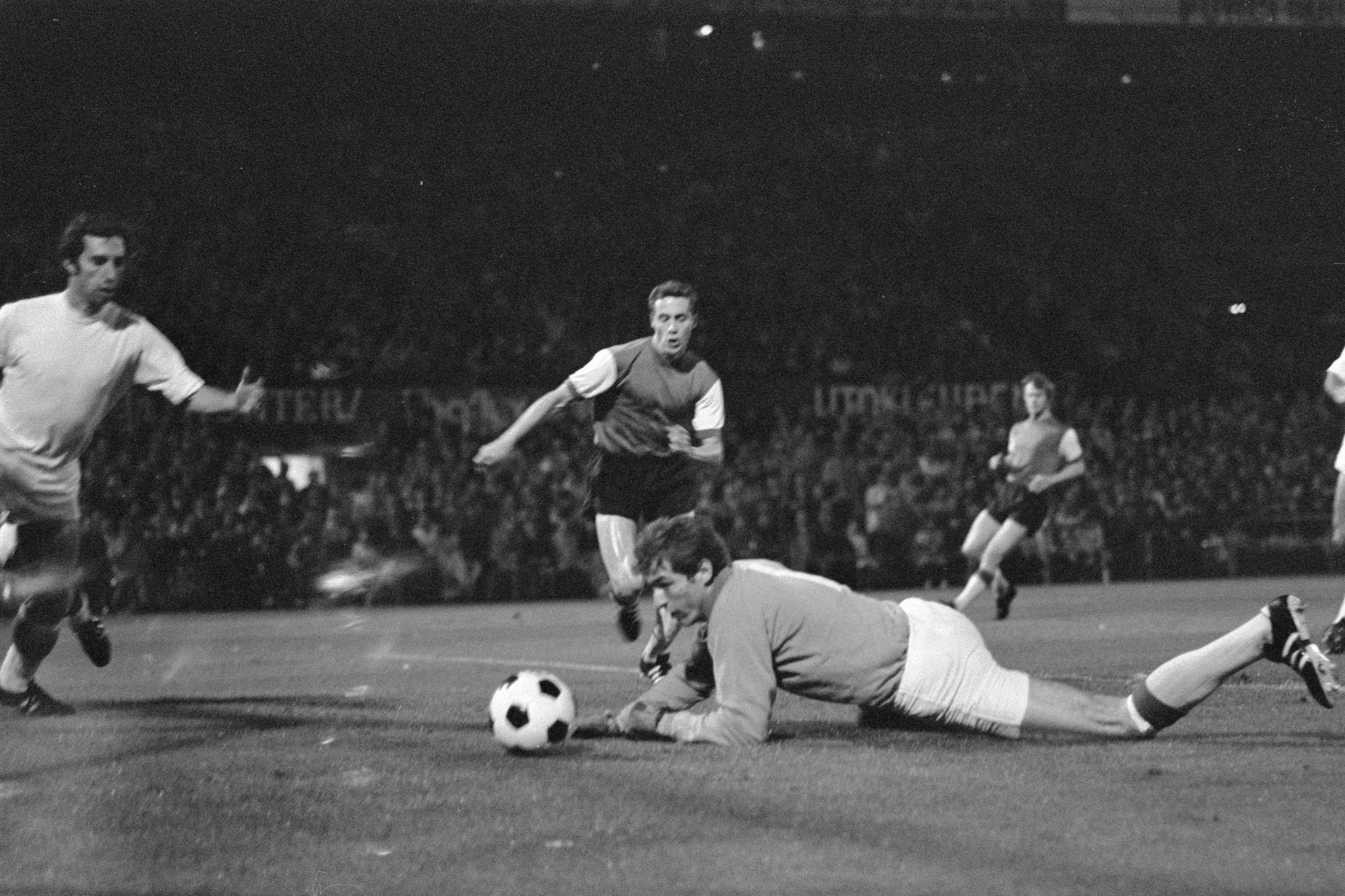
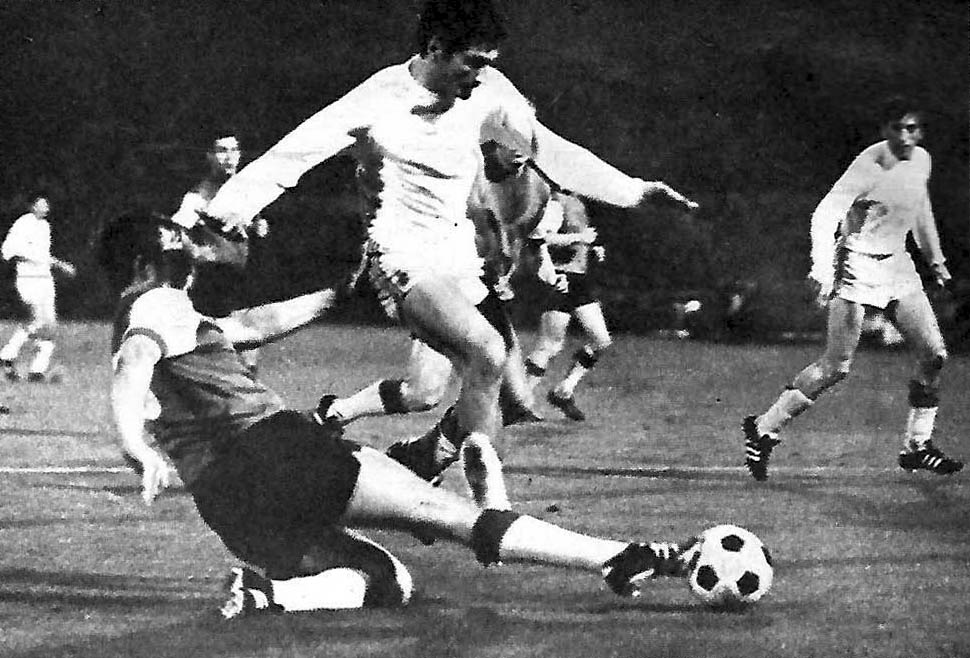
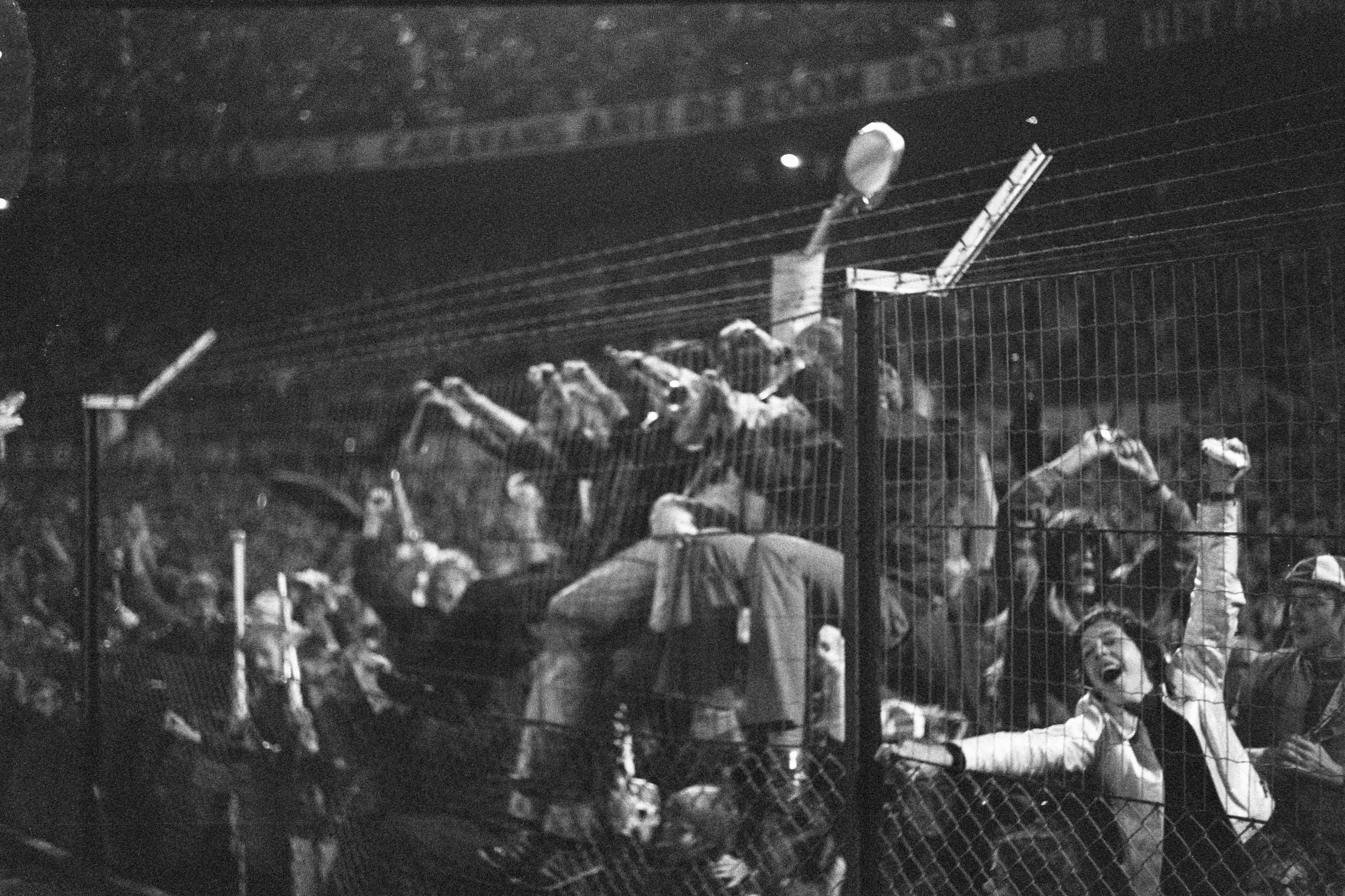
Several moments of the match
9 September 1970
Second leg

Feyenoord (Netherlands)	1–0	(Argentina) Estudiantes LP
Van Daele 63'	Report

De Kuip, Rotterdam
Attendance: 63,475
Referee: Alberto Tejada Burga (Peru)

**Feyenoord**	**Estudiantes LP**

GK	1	(Netherlands) Eddy Treijtel
RB	2	(Netherlands) Piet Romeijn
SW	3	(Netherlands) Rinus Israël
CB	4	(Netherlands) Theo Laseroms
LB	5	(Netherlands) Theo van Duivenbode
CM	6	(Austria) Franz Hasil	(substituted off) 46'
CM	7	(Netherlands) Wim Jansen (c)
CM	10	(Netherlands) Willem van Hanegem
RW	8	(Netherlands) Henk Wery
CF	9	(Sweden) Ove Kindvall
LW	11	(Netherlands) Coen Moulijn	(substituted off) 61'
Substitutes:
CM	12	(Netherlands) Johan Boskamp	(substituted on) 46'
DF	13	(Netherlands) Joop van Daele	(substituted on) 61'
Manager:
(Austria) Ernst Happel

GK	1	(Argentina) Oscar Pezzano
RB	6	(Argentina) Oscar Malbernat (c)
CB	2	(Argentina) Hugo Spadaro
CB	3	(Argentina) Néstor Togneri
LB	13	(Argentina) José Hugo Medina
MF	8	(Argentina) Carlos Bilardo
MF	5	(Argentina) Carlos Pachamé
MF	16	(Argentina) Daniel Romeo	(substituted off) 61'
FW	7	(Argentina) Marcos Conigliaro	(substituted off) 51'
FW	9	(Argentina) Eduardo Flores
FW	11	(Argentina) Juan Ramón Verón
Substitutes:
FW	14	(Argentina) Christian Rudzki	(substituted on) 51'
DF	4	(Argentina) Rubén Pagnanini	(substituted on) 61'
Manager:
(Argentina) Osvaldo Zubeldía

== See also ==
- 1969–70 European Cup
- 1970 Copa Libertadores
