= Eddy Treijtel =

Dutch footballer

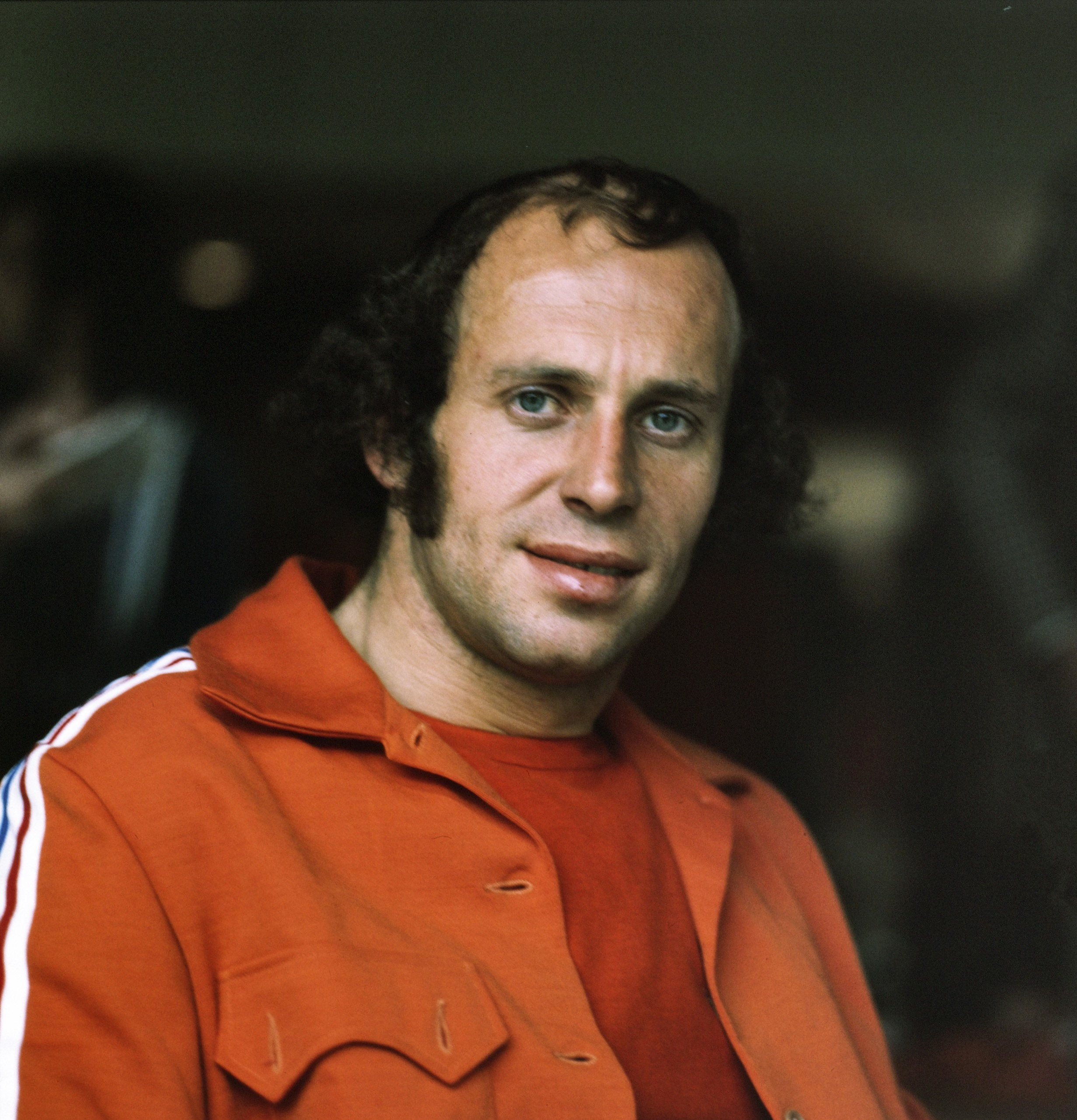
- Treijtel in 1974

Personal information
- Full name: Eduard Willem Treijtel
- Date of birth: 28 May 1946 (age 80)
- Place of birth: Rotterdam, Netherlands
- Position: Goalkeeper

Youth career
- VV Schiebroek
- Xerxes

Senior career*
Years	Team	Apps	(Gls)
1964–1967	Xerxes	57	(0)
1967–1968	Xerxes/DHC	33	(0)
1968–1979	Feyenoord	322	(0)
1979–1985	AZ'67	170	(0)
Total		582	(0)

International career
1969–1976	Netherlands	5	(0)
Medal record
Men's football
Representing Netherlands
FIFA World Cup
Runner-up	1974 West Germany
- * Club domestic league appearances and goals

Eduard Willem Treijtel (born 28 May 1946) is a Dutch former professional footballer who played as a goalkeeper. He won the Intercontinental Cup in 1970 and the UEFA Cup in the 1973–74 season with Feyenoord.

== Club career ==
Treijtel was born in Rotterdam. He joined Feyenoord from Xerxes/DHC in 1968 along with Willem van Hanegem. On 15 November 1970, Treijtel took down a gull with the ball from a goal-kick during the derby between Sparta Rotterdam and Feyenoord. That gull was later put in Feyenoord's Home of History, but notable Sparta fans want it to be transferred to Sparta's museum. Treijtel moved to AZ'67 in 1979. He retired in 1985.

== International career ==
Treijtel obtained five caps for the Netherlands national team. He represented his country in two FIFA World Cup qualification matches and was a non-playing squad member at the 1974 FIFA World Cup.

== Career statistics ==
=== International ===
Appearances and goals by national team and year
National team	Year	Apps	Goals
Netherlands	1969	2	0
Netherlands	1970	1	0
Netherlands	1971	0	0
Netherlands	1972	0	0
Netherlands	1973	0	0
Netherlands	1974	1	0
Netherlands	1975	0	0
Netherlands	1976	1	0
Total		5	0

== Honours ==
Feyenoord

- Eredivisie: 1968–69, 1970–71, 1973–74
- KNVB Cup: 1968–69
- European Cup: 1969–70
- Intercontinental Cup: 1970
- UEFA Cup: 1973–74

AZ'67

- Eredivisie: 1980–81
- UEFA Cup: runner-up 1980–81

Netherlands

- FIFA World Cup: runner-up 1974
