= Eddy Pieters Graafland =

Dutch footballer (1934–2020)

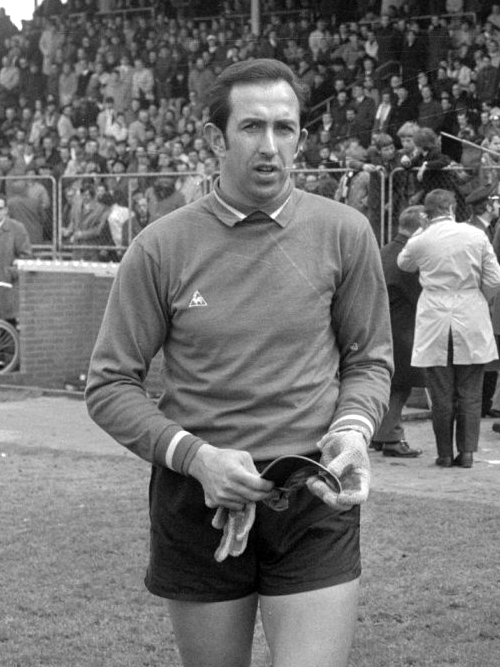
- Pieters Graafland in 1970

Personal information
- Full name: Eduard Laurens Pieters Graafland
- Date of birth: 5 January 1934
- Place of birth: Amsterdam, Netherlands
- Date of death: 28 April 2020 (aged 86)
- Place of death: Barendrecht, Netherlands
- Height: 1.86 m (6 ft 1 in)
- Position: Goalkeeper

Youth career
- 1948–1952: Ajax

Senior career*
Years	Team	Apps	(Gls)
1952–1958	Ajax	154	(0)
1958–1970	Feijenoord	356	(0)

International career
1957–1967	Netherlands	47	(0)

Managerial career
- 1979–1981: Feyenoord (youth coach)
- * Club domestic league appearances and goals

Eduard Laurens Pieters Graafland (5 January 1934 – 28 April 2020) was a Dutch professional football player and coach. As a player, he was the goalkeeper of Ajax, Feyenoord and the Netherlands. In 1970, his last season as a professional, he won the Europa Cup with Feijenoord. In total, he was capped for the national team 47 times.

His nickname was, after his abbreviated surname, Eddy PG. He was a renowned penalty stopper, and kept a notebook with potential penalty takers' favorite side.

== Career ==
At the age of eleven he became a member of Ajax. Twelve was the minimum age, but his father was a board member, which gave him priority. At the age of seventeen, in 1951, he made his debut in Ajax's first team. In the mid-1950s, Pieters Graafland fulfilled his military service in Arnhem. From that moment on he practiced for a year with the first team of Vitesse. After his military service he returned to Amsterdam. On 28 April 1957, Pieters Graafland made his international debut for the Netherlands against Belgium (1–1).

In 1958, Pieters Graafland left for Feijenoord for the, at that time, record sum of 134,000 guilders. He experienced his greatest success in 1970; his final year as a player. That season, he was initially benched by Feijenoord coach Ernst Happel as first goalkeeper and replaced by Eddy Treijtel. Happel made him the starter for the Europa Cup final against Celtic. Initially, Pieters Graafland did not want to play this match: "You haven't seen me all season. I'm not doing it," was his initial reaction, allegedly. He changed his decision later and partly thanks to his goalkeeping work, Feyenoord won the final 2–1. It was his last official game in professional football.

== Outside football ==
After his playing career he started a trade in promotional and business gifts. Pieters Graafland's hobby was making amateur film images. Parts of the films he made during his sporting career were regularly broadcast in various sports programs on television. He shot the images of Jan Janssen's Tour de France victory in 1968. In 1999, he was voted the third Dutch goalkeeper, after Hans van Breukelen and Edwin van der Sar, in the election of European goalkeeper of the twentieth century organized by the International Federation of Football History & Statistics (IFFHS).

Pieters Graafland was a knight in the Order of Oranje-Nassau. In 2017, he and his wife Teddy celebrated their diamond wedding.

== Death ==
He died on 28 April 2020, at the age of 86.

== Honours ==
Ajax

- Eredivisie: 1956–57

Feyenoord

- Eredivisie: 1960–61, 1961–62, 1964–65, 1968–69
- KNVB Cup: 1964–65, 1968–69
- European Cup: 1969–70
