= Oscar Pezzano =

Argentine footballer

Personal information
- Date of birth: May 3, 1949
- Place of birth: Carhué, Argentina
- Date of death: February 19, 1994
- Place of death: Carhué, Argentina
- Position: Goalkeeper

Youth career
- Sacachispas

Senior career*
Years	Team	Apps	(Gls)
1970–1971	Estudiantes de La Plata		
1972	Vélez Sársfield		
1973–1980	Estudiantes de La Plata		
1981	Club 9 de Octubre		
1983–1984	Temperley		
1985	Banfield		
- * Club domestic league appearances and goals

Oscar Pezzano (3 May 1948 - 19 February 1994) was an Argentine football goalkeeper, notable for his years in Estudiantes de La Plata.

Pezzano started his career in Buenos Aires minor-league club Sacachispas, and joined Estudiantes in 1970. He was the goalkeeper in two significant international matches against Feyenoord for the Inter-continental Cup in 1970 and against Nacional de Montevideo in the 1971 Copa Libertadores decider played in Lima, Peru.

Pezzano remained in Estudiantes (with a short stint in Vélez Sársfield during 1973), where he played 349 matches, making him the goalkeeper with the most appearances for the team. His signature jersey color was pink, leading to his nickname "the pink panther".

After the 1980 campaign, Pezzano played for other clubs in Argentina and Ecuador, and retired from active play in 1985. He remained in football, mostly coaching provincial teams.

Pezzano was stabbed to death on 19 February 1994 in his native city of Carhué, Buenos Aires province, where he was coaching a local team, while trying to mediate in a dispute outside a night club.
