= Piet Romeijn =

Dutch footballer

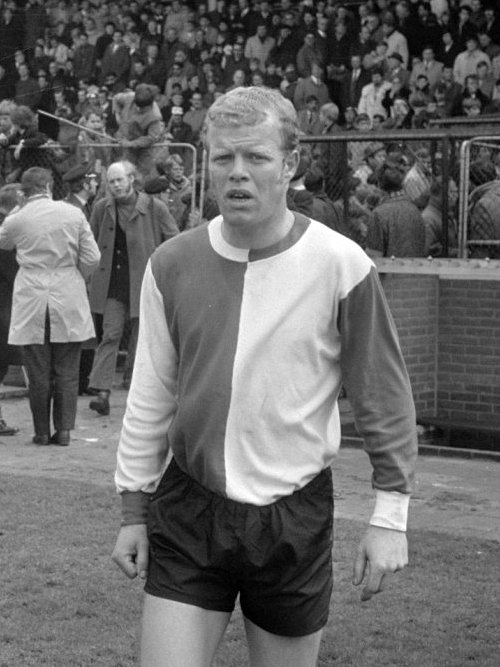

Personal information
- Full name: Piet Romeijn
- Date of birth: September 10, 1939 (age 87)
- Place of birth: Schiedam, South Holland, Netherlands
- Position: Defender

Youth career
- SVV

Senior career*
Years	Team	Apps	(Gls)
1955–1962	SVV		
1962–1972	Feijenoord	198	(3)
1972–1973	SVV		

International career
1967–1968	Netherlands	4	(1)
- * Club domestic league appearances and goals

Piet Romeijn (born 10 September 1939) is a Dutch former footballer who played for Feyenoord and was part of their European Cup victory in 1970. He earned 4 caps for the Netherlands national football team.

On 30 July 1971 he opened a sport shop in Schiedam.
