= Ove Kindvall =

Swedish footballer (1943–2025)

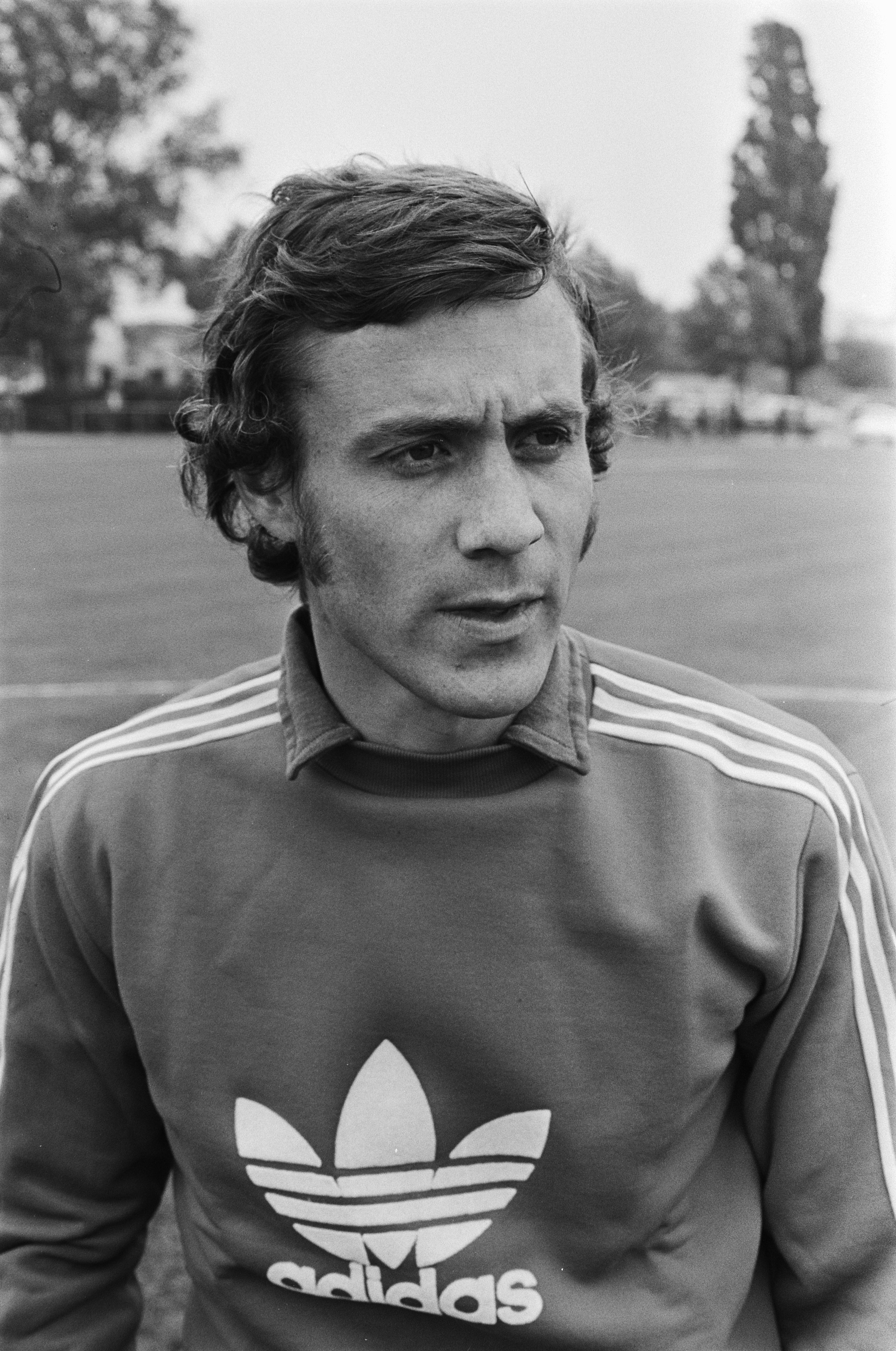
- Kindvall with Sweden during the 1974 FIFA World Cup

Personal information
- Full name: Bengt Ove Kindvall
- Date of birth: 16 May 1943
- Place of birth: Norrköping, Sweden
- Date of death: 5 August 2025 (aged 82)
- Height: 1.74 m (5 ft 9 in)
- Position: Striker

Youth career
- IFK Norrköping

Senior career*
Years	Team	Apps	(Gls)
1962–1966	IFK Norrköping	84	(70)
1966–1971	Feyenoord	144	(129)
1971–1975	IFK Norrköping	94	(30)
1975–1977	IFK Göteborg	58	(30)
Total		344	(259)

International career
1961	Sweden U19	3	(0)
1964	Sweden U21	2	(0)
1963–1964	Sweden B	2	(4)
1965–1974	Sweden	43	(16)

Managerial career
- 1979–1980: IFK Göteborg (chairman)
- * Club domestic league appearances and goals

Bengt Ove Kindvall (Swedish pronunciation: ['beŋkt 'uːve 'tɕindvɑːl], 16 May 1943 – 5 August 2025) was a Swedish professional footballer who played as a striker. He started his career at IFK Norrköping, where he played until he joined Feyenoord in 1966 and became professional. The same year, he won the Guldbollen, as the best Swedish footballer of the year. He is regarded as one of Sweden's greatest ever players. A full international between 1965 and 1974, he won 43 caps and scored 16 goals for the Sweden national team. He represented his country at the 1970 and 1974 FIFA World Cups.

== Club career ==
With Feyenoord he won two national championships as well as the 1970 European Cup. In the final against Celtic he scored the winning goal in extra time. In his five seasons with the club, Kindvall scored 129 league goals in 144 games. He returned to Sweden and Norrköping 1971, where he played for three years, until ending his career in IFK Göteborg.

He was the first non-Dutchman to be named Eredivisie top scorer, doing so in 1968, 1969 and 1971. No other foreigner achieved this until Romário in 1989.

Kindvall earned the Svenska Dagbladet Gold Medal in 1969. In that year, he was named as the fourth best player in Europe.

== International career ==
Kindvall played 43 games with the national team and scored 16 goals. He participated in the 1970 and 1974 FIFA World Cup, playing a major role in the team's qualification for the former.

== Personal life and death ==
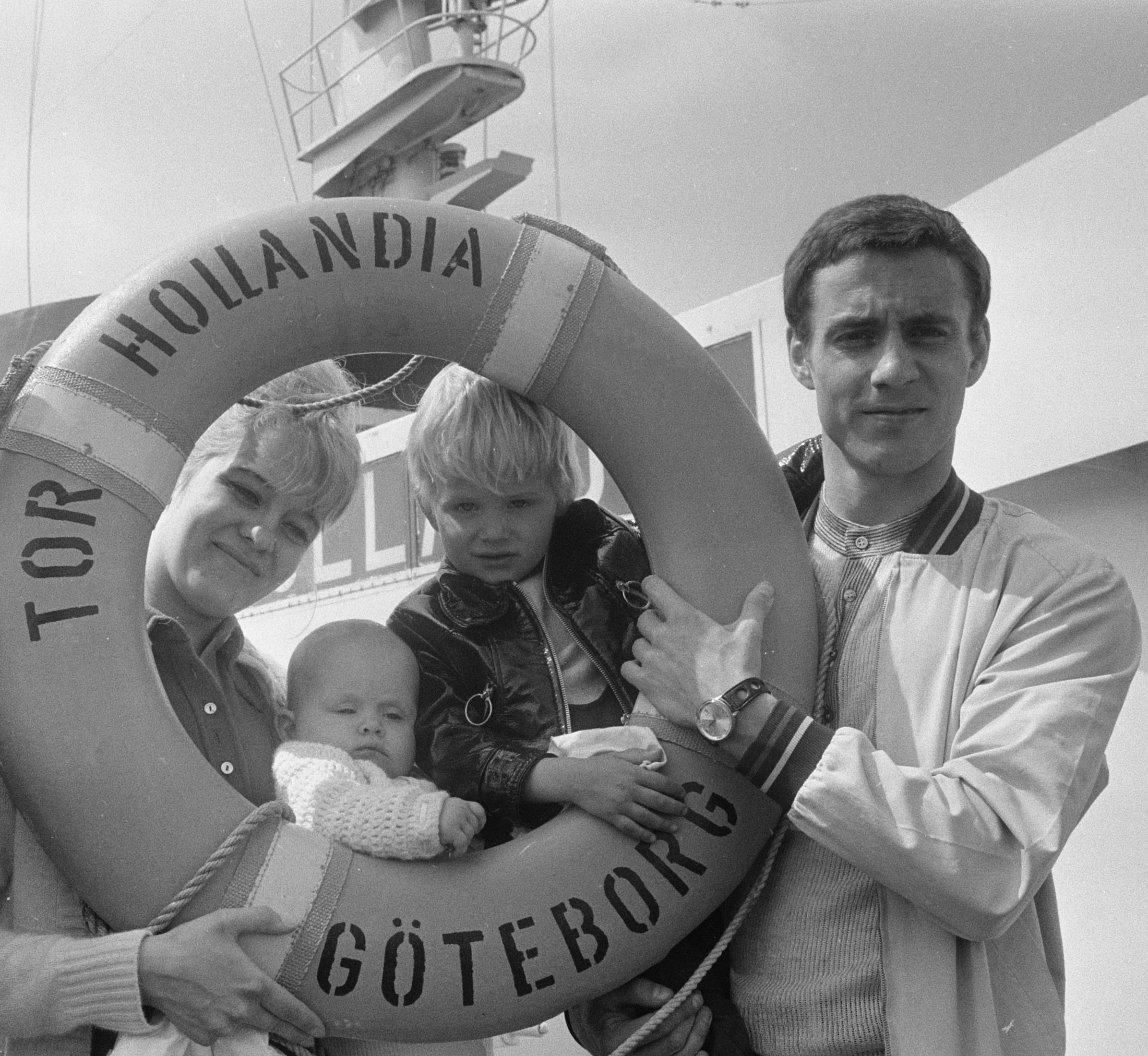
Kindvall with family in 1970

He was the father of former footballers Niclas Kindvall and Tina Kindvall, and brother of Kaj Kindvall, a radio host.

Kindvall died on 5 August 2025, at the age of 82.

== Career statistics ==
=== International ===
Appearances and goals by national team and year
National team	Year	Apps	Goals
Sweden	1965	3	1
Sweden	1966	6	4
Sweden	1967	0	0
Sweden	1968	3	3
Sweden	1969	3	4
Sweden	1970	3	0
Sweden	1971	4	1
Sweden	1972	5	0
Sweden	1973	10	3
Sweden	1974	6	0
Total		43	16

Scores and results list Sweden's goal tally first, score column indicates score after each Kindvall goal.

List of international goals scored by Ove Kindvall
No.	Date	Venue	Opponent	Score	Result	Competition	Ref.
1	7 November 1965	Dr. Fazil Kucuk Stadium, Famagusta, Cyprus	Cyprus	3–0	5–0	1966 FIFA World Cup qualifier	
2	27 April 1966	Zentralstadion, Leipzig, East Germany	East Germany	1–3	1–4	Friendly	
3	30 June 1966	Ullevi, Gothenburg, Sweden	Brazil	1–1	2–3	Friendly	
4	30 June 1966	Ullevi, Gothenburg, Sweden	Brazil	2–3	2–3	Friendly	
5	5 October 1966	Råsunda, Solna, Sweden	Austria	2–0	4–1	Friendly	
6	9 October 1968	Råsunda, Solna, Sweden	Norway	1–0	5–0	1970 FIFA World Cup qualifier	
7	9 October 1968	Råsunda, Solna, Sweden	Norway	3–0	5–0	1970 FIFA World Cup qualifier	
8	9 October 1968	Råsunda, Solna, Sweden	Norway	4–0	5–0	1970 FIFA World Cup qualifier	
9	1 May 1969	Malmö Stadium, Malmö, Sweden	Mexico	1–0	1–0	Friendly	
10	19 June 1969	Ullevaal Stadium, Oslo, Norway	Norway	3–0	5–2	1970 FIFA World Cup qualifier	
11	15 October 1969	Råsunda, Solna, Sweden	France	1–0	2–0	1970 FIFA World Cup qualifier	
12	15 October 1969	Råsunda, Solna, Sweden	France	2–0	2–0	1970 FIFA World Cup qualifier	
13	27 June 1971	Ullevi, Gothenburg, Sweden	West Germany	1–0	1–0	Friendly	
14	26 April 1973	Parken, Copenhagen, Denmark	Denmark	2–1	2–1	Friendly	
15	13 June 1973	Nepstadion, Budapest, Hungary	Hungary	1–1	3–3	1974 FIFA World Cup qualifier	
16	11 November 1973	Gżira Stadium, Gżira, Malta	Malta	1–1	2–1	1974 FIFA World Cup qualifier	

== Honours ==
IFK Norrköping

- Allsvenskan: 1962, 1963

Feyenoord

- Intercontinental Cup: 1970
- European Cup: 1969–70
- Intertoto Cup: 1967, 1968
- Eredivisie: 1968–69, 1970–71
- KNVB Cup: 1968-69

Individual

- Guldbollen: 1966
- Allsvenskan top scorer: 1966
- Eredivisie top scorer: 1967–68, 1968–69, 1970–71
- Ballon d'Or fourth place: 1969 (shared with Johan Cruyff)
- FUWO European Team of the Season: 1969

== Sources ==
- (in Dutch) Profile
- (in Dutch) History of Feyenoord

Awards
Preceded by Toini Gustafsson-Rönnlund	Svenska Dagbladet Gold Medal; 1969	Succeeded by Gunnar Larsson
