= 1968–69 Eredivisie =

13th season of the Eredivisie

Eredivisie
- Season: 1968–69
- Champions: Feijenoord (9th title)
- Promoted: Holland Sport; AZ '67
- Relegated: FC Volendam; Fortuna SC
- European Cup: Feijenoord
- Cup Winners' Cup: PSV Eindhoven
- Inter-Cities Fairs Cup: AFC Ajax; FC Twente
- Goals: 797
- Average goals/game: 2.60
- Top goalscorer: (Netherlands) Dick van Dijk; FC Twente; (Sweden) Ove Kindvall; Feijenoord 30 goals

The Dutch Eredivisie in the 1968–69 season was contested by 18 teams. Feijenoord won the championship.

== Teams ==
A total of 18 teams are taking part in the league.

Location of teams in Eredivisie 1968–69

Club	Location
ADO Den Haag	The Hague
AFC Ajax	Amsterdam
AZ '67	Alkmaar
DOS	Utrecht
DWS	Amsterdam
Feyenoord	Rotterdam
Fortuna Sittard	Sittard
Go Ahead	Deventer
GVAV	Groningen
Holland Sport	The Hague
MVV	Maastricht
NAC Breda	Breda
N.E.C.	Nijmegen
PSV Eindhoven	Eindhoven
Sparta Rotterdam	Rotterdam
Telstar	IJmuiden
FC Twente	Enschede
FC Volendam	Volendam

== Managers ==
Club	Managers
ADO Den Haag	(Austria) Ernst Happel
AFC Ajax	(Netherlands) Rinus Michels
AZ '67	(Netherlands) Wim Blokland
DOS	(Netherlands) Co Stijger
DWS	(England) Les Talbot
Feyenoord	(Netherlands) Ben Peeters
Fortuna Sittard	(Netherlands) Frans de Bruyn
Go Ahead	(Czechoslovakia) František Fadrhonc
GVAV	(Netherlands) Ludwig Veg
Holland Sport	(Netherlands) Cor van der Hart
MVV	(Netherlands) Jung Schlangen
NAC Breda	(Netherlands) Leo Canjels
N.E.C.	(Netherlands) Jan Remmers
PSV Eindhoven	(Germany) Kurt Linder
Sparta Rotterdam	(Netherlands) Wiel Coerver
Telstar	(Netherlands) Piet de Visser
FC Twente	(Netherlands) Kees Rijvers
FC Volendam	(England) Ron Dellow

== League standings ==
Pos	Team	Pld	W	D	L	GF	GA	GD	Pts	Qualification or relegation
1	Feijenoord	34	26	5	3	73	21	+52	57	Qualified for 1969–70 European Cup.
2	AFC Ajax	34	25	4	5	90	34	+56	54	Qualified for 1969–70 Inter-Cities Fairs Cup.
3	FC Twente	34	21	5	8	69	38	+31	47	Qualified for 1969–70 Inter-Cities Fairs Cup.
4	Go Ahead	34	19	7	8	63	34	+29	45	
5	PSV Eindhoven	34	17	10	7	54	36	+18	44	Qualified for 1969–70 European Cup Winners' Cup.
6	ADO Den Haag	34	12	13	9	45	37	+8	37	
7	NAC	34	10	15	9	50	48	+2	35	
8	Sparta Rotterdam	34	11	12	11	45	33	+12	34	
9	DWS	34	13	8	13	42	41	+1	34	
10	Holland Sport	34	12	9	13	32	45	−13	33	
11	GVAV	34	8	12	14	32	48	−16	28	
12	NEC	34	9	9	16	29	38	−9	27	
13	MVV Maastricht	34	7	12	15	34	46	−12	26	
14	Telstar	34	7	10	17	33	65	−32	24	
15	FC Volendam	34	6	11	17	24	45	−21	23	Relegation play-off as level on points.
16	AZ '67	34	5	13	16	27	53	−26	23	Relegation play-off as level on points.
17	DOS	34	7	9	18	37	74	−37	23	Relegation play-off as level on points.
18	Fortuna SC	34	3	12	19	18	61	−43	18	Relegated to Eerste Divisie.

Source: rsssf.com

== Results ==
Home \ Away	ADO	AJA	AZ	DOS	DWA	FEY	FOR	GOA	GVA	HOL	MVV	NAC	NEC	PSV	SPA	TEL	TWE	VOL
ADO		2–5	2–0	1–3	2–0	2–3	4–0	1–1	3–2	2–1	1–0	1–1	3–0	0–0	0–0	2–2	1–3	4–0
Ajax	1–0		4–0	7–0	3–2	0–1	2–0	4–3	6–0	2–2	2–1	8–1	2–1	1–2	2–1	9–2	2–0	2–0
AZ '67	1–1	0–3		2–3	0–0	1–1	1–1	0–0	1–1	2–0	4–1	2–0	3–0	2–0	1–1	0–0	1–2	0–0
DOS	1–1	1–1	1–1		3–2	0–3	1–2	0–4	1–0	4–1	2–2	3–3	0–0	1–1	0–3	2–0	0–5	0–0
DWS/A	0–0	2–1	2–0	1–0		0–1	1–0	4–2	2–0	2–1	2–0	2–0	4–0	1–2	0–0	0–0	1–3	2–1
Feijenoord	1–1	1–1	2–0	2–0	3–0		5–0	4–0	3–0	6–0	4–1	2–1	1–0	2–0	2–1	4–1	3–0	1–0
Fortuna SC	0–0	0–1	3–0	1–3	0–0	0–0		1–1	0–0	0–0	0–0	0–0	1–1	1–3	0–2	3–0	1–4	1–1
Go Ahead	2–1	2–1	5–0	7–0	2–1	3–1	2–0		3–0	0–0	2–1	3–1	1–0	1–1	2–1	3–0	4–0	1–0
GVAV	1–0	1–2	0–0	3–0	2–2	1–2	0–0	1–1		1–0	3–0	4–2	0–0	3–0	3–1	1–0	2–4	0–0
Holland Sport	1–3	0–3	3–0	1–1	2–1	1–0	3–0	1–0	4–1		0–0	0–0	1–0	0–0	1–1	2–0	0–0	2–1
MVV	1–2	2–2	1–0	4–0	1–1	2–3	1–0	0–2	0–0	3–0		1–2	0–0	2–4	0–0	3–0	2–1	1–0
NAC	0–1	0–2	6–0	1–0	1–1	3–1	5–1	1–1	2–1	2–0	0–0		2–0	2–2	1–0	4–4	0–0	3–0
N.E.C.	0–1	1–2	1–1	2–1	2–1	0–1	4–0	1–0	2–0	0–1	1–0	1–1		1–1	0–1	3–1	2–0	0–0
PSV	2–0	0–1	2–1	3–1	2–1	0–3	2–0	0–1	0–0	4–0	2–1	2–0	3–1		1–1	2–0	1–1	4–2
Sparta	2–2	0–1	3–1	2–1	3–0	0–1	5–0	3–0	0–0	3–0	1–1	3–3	0–3	2–3		2–0	0–0	1–1
Telstar	1–1	1–4	1–1	2–1	0–2	0–0	3–1	1–0	1–1	1–3	1–1	1–1	1–0	0–3	0–1		4–2	2–0
FC Twente	2–0	5–1	1–0	3–2	4–1	0–1	3–0	4–1	4–0	2–0	3–0	1–1	4–2	2–1	2–1	2–1		1–0
Volendam	0–0	0–2	2–1	3–1	0–1	2–5	3–1	0–3	2–0	0–1	1–1	0–0	0–0	1–1	1–0	1–2	2–1	

Legend: Blue = home team win; Yellow = draw; Red = away team win.

== Relegation play-offs ==
Since FC Volendam, AZ '67 and DOS had an equal number of points at the end of the competition, extra matches were played.

Pos	Team	Pld	W	D	L	GF	GA	GD	Pts	Relegation
1	DOS	2	1	1	0	3	3	0	3	
2	AZ '67	2	0	2	0	1	1	0	2	
3	FC Volendam	2	0	1	1	1	2	−1	1	Relegated to Eerste Divisie.

Source: rsssf.com

== Attendances ==
#	Club	Average	Change
1	Feijenoord	47,647	−0.9
2	Ajax	20,794	−18.5
3	Twente	18,471	+64.8
4	NEC	14,412	−23.9
5	Go Ahead	14,265	+9.5
6	Holland Sport	14,265	+23.1
7	ADO	13,176	−14.0
8	PSV	12,559	−3.2
9	Sparta	12,353	−15.2
10	DOS	10,500	−8.6
11	NAC	10,235	−4.6
12	MVV	9,512	+17.2
13	AZ	9,382	+15.7
14	Fortuna	8,176	−16.3
15	DWS	8,147	−13.4
16	Telstar	7,941	−8.8
17	GVAV	7,294	−34.0
18	Volendam	6,176	−15.3

== See also ==
- 1968–69 Eerste Divisie
- 1968–69 Tweede Divisie
