= Dutch football clubs in European competitions =

Dutch football clubs have entered European association football competitions since 1900, when HVV and RAP took part in the inaugural season of the Coupe Van der Straeten Ponthoz (one of the first European club football tournaments, is considered a predecessor of club tournaments in Europe, namely the European Cup), which was also won by RAP.

In the inaugural 1955–56 European Cup, PSV Eindhoven participated as the national champions. Feyenoord became the first Dutch club to win the European Cup in 1970. Subsequently, followed by three consecutive European Cup wins by Ajax. The third Dutch club to win the European Cup was PSV Eindhoven, doing so in 1988.

== Main UEFA finals ==
Year	Competition	(Netherlands) Dutch team	Opposing team	Score	Venue
1969	European Cup	Ajax	(Italy) Milan	1–4	(Spain) Santiago Bernabéu, Madrid
1970	European Cup	Feyenoord	(Scotland) Celtic	2–1 (a.e.t.)	(Italy) San Siro, Milan
1971	European Cup	Ajax	(Greece) Panathinaikos	2–0	(England) Wembley Stadium, London
1972	European Cup	Ajax	(Italy) Internazionale	2–0	(Netherlands) De Kuip, Rotterdam
1973	European Cup	Ajax	(Italy) Juventus	1–0	(Socialist Federal Republic of Yugoslavia) Stadion Crvena Zvezda, Belgrade
1973	European Super Cup	Ajax	(Italy) Milan	1–0	(Italy) San Siro, Milan
1973	European Super Cup	Ajax	(Italy) Milan	6–0 (6–1 agg.)	(Netherlands) Olympic Stadium, Amsterdam
1974	UEFA Cup	Feyenoord	(England) Tottenham Hotspur	2–2	(England) White Hart Lane, London
1974	UEFA Cup	Feyenoord	(England) Tottenham Hotspur	2–0 (4–2 agg.)	(Netherlands) De Kuip, Rotterdam
1975	UEFA Cup	FC Twente	(Germany) Borussia Mönchengladbach	0–0	(Germany) Rheinstadion, Düsseldorf
1975	UEFA Cup	FC Twente	(Germany) Borussia Mönchengladbach	1–5 (1–5 agg.)	(Netherlands) Diekman Stadion, Enschede
1978	UEFA Cup	PSV Eindhoven	(France) Bastia	0–0	(France) Stade Furiani, Bastia
1978	UEFA Cup	PSV Eindhoven	(France) Bastia	3–0 (3–0 agg.)	(Netherlands) Philips Stadion, Eindhoven
1981	UEFA Cup	AZ '67	(England) Ipswich Town	3–0	(England) Portman Road, Ipswich
1981	UEFA Cup	AZ '67	(England) Ipswich Town	4–2 (4–5 agg.)	(Netherlands) Olympic Stadium, Amsterdam
1987	European Cup Winners' Cup	Ajax	(East Germany) Lokomotiv Leipzig	1–0	(Greece) Olympic Stadium, Athens
1987	European Super Cup	Ajax	(Portugal) Porto	0–1	(Netherlands) Olympic Stadium, Amsterdam
1987	European Super Cup	Ajax	(Portugal) Porto	1–0 (0–2 agg.)	(Portugal) Estádio das Antas, Porto
1988	European Cup Winners' Cup	Ajax	(Belgium) Mechelen	0–1	(France) Stade de la Meinau, Strasbourg
1988	European Cup	PSV Eindhoven	(Portugal) Benfica	0–0 (a.e.t.) (6–5 p)	(Germany) Neckarstadion, Stuttgart
1988	European Super Cup	PSV Eindhoven	(Belgium) Mechelen	0–3	(Belgium) Argosstadion Achter de Kazerne, Mechelen
1988	European Super Cup	PSV Eindhoven	(Belgium) Mechelen	1–0 (1–3 agg.)	(Netherlands) Philips Stadion, Eindhoven
1992	UEFA Cup	Ajax	(Italy) Torino	2–2	(Italy) Stadio delle Alpi, Turin
1992	UEFA Cup	Ajax	(Italy) Torino	0–0 (2–2 agg.) (a)	(Netherlands) Olympic Stadium, Amsterdam
1995	UEFA Champions League	Ajax	(Italy) Milan	1–0	(Austria) Ernst-Happel-Stadion, Vienna
1995	UEFA Super Cup	Ajax	(Spain) Zaragoza	1–1	(Spain) La Romareda, Zaragoza
1995	UEFA Super Cup	Ajax	(Spain) Zaragoza	4–0 (5–1 agg.)	(Netherlands) Olympic Stadium, Amsterdam
1996	UEFA Champions League	Ajax	(Italy) Juventus	1–1 (a.e.t.) (2–4 p)	(Italy) Stadio Olimpico, Rome
2002	UEFA Cup	Feyenoord	(Germany) Borussia Dortmund	3–2	(Netherlands) De Kuip, Rotterdam
2002	UEFA Super Cup	Feyenoord	(Spain) Real Madrid	1–3	Stade Louis II, Monaco
2017	UEFA Europa League	Ajax	(England) Manchester United	0–2	(Sweden) Friends Arena, Stockholm
2022	UEFA Europa Conference League	Feyenoord	(Italy) Roma	0–1	(Albania) Arena Kombëtare, Tirana

== Intercontinental finals ==
Year	Competition	(Netherlands) Dutch team	Opposing team	Score	Venue
1970	Intercontinental Cup	Feyenoord	(Argentina) Estudiantes	2–2	(Argentina) La Bombonera, Buenos Aires
1970	Intercontinental Cup	Feyenoord	(Argentina) Estudiantes	1–0 (3–2 agg.)	(Netherlands) De Kuip, Rotterdam
1971	(Note: Ajax had qualified for the Intercontinental Cup, but declined to participate in tournament.)				
1972	Intercontinental Cup	Ajax	(Argentina) Independiente	1–1	(Argentina) Estadio Libertadores de América, Buenos Aires
1972	Intercontinental Cup	Ajax	(Argentina) Independiente	3–0 (4–1 agg.)	(Netherlands) Olympic Stadium, Amsterdam
1973					
1988	Intercontinental Cup	PSV	(Uruguay) Nacional	2–2 (a.e.t.) 6–7 (p)	(Japan) National Stadium, Tokyo
1995	Intercontinental Cup	Ajax	(Brazil) Grêmio	0–0 (a.e.t.) 4–3 (p)	(Japan) National Stadium, Tokyo

== Lower or non-UEFA European finals ==
Year	Competition	(Netherlands) Dutch team	Opposing team	Score	Venue
1962	Intertoto Cup (Note: The Intertoto Cup did not become an official UEFA tournament until 1995.)	Ajax	(Netherlands) Feyenoord	4–2	(Netherlands) Olympic Stadium, Amsterdam
1972	European Super Cup (Note: Excludes the 1972 European Super Cup, not organised nor recognised by UEFA as an official title.)	Ajax	(Scotland) Rangers	1–3	(Scotland) Ibrox Stadium, Glasgow
1972	European Super Cup	Ajax	(Scotland) Rangers	3–2 (6–3 agg.)	(Netherlands) Olympic Stadium, Amsterdam
2003	UEFA Intertoto Cup (Note: From 1995 to 2005 there were three joint winners in the UEFA Intertoto Cup.)	Heerenveen	(Spain) Villarreal	1–2	(Netherlands) Abe Lenstra Stadion, Heerenveen
2003	UEFA Intertoto Cup	Heerenveen	(Spain) Villarreal	0–0 (1–2 agg.)	(Spain) El Madrigal, Villarreal

== Final appearance by competition ==
Competition	Winners	Runners-up	Total
European Cup / UEFA Champions League	6	2	8
European / UEFA Cup Winners' Cup	1	1	2
UEFA Cup / UEFA Europa League	4	3	7
UEFA Conference League	0	1	1
UEFA Super Cup	2	3	5
Total UEFA Finals	13	10	23
Intercontinental Cup / FIFA Club World Cup	3	1	4

== Friendly finals ==
*Only friendly tournaments where three or more clubs, from at least two different countries participated in a tournament format (at least semi-finals, final) are included in this list.

Year	Competition	(Netherlands) Dutch team	Opposing team	Score	Venue	Source
1900	Coupe Van der Straeten Ponthoz	RAP	(Netherlands) HVV	2–1	(Belgium) Léopold FC's field, Brussels	
1901	Coupe Van der Straeten Ponthoz	HBS	(Belgium) Racing Club	1–0	(Belgium) Léopold FC's field, Brussels	
1902	Coupe Van der Straeten Ponthoz	D.F.C.	(England) Pilgrims	2–4	(Belgium) Léopold FC's field, Brussels	
1921	Tournoi du Nouvel An du Red Star	Maastricht VV	(France) Red Star Paris	1–1 (Note: The two teams where declared winners ex aequo).	(France) Stade de Paris, Paris	
1923	Coupe Jean Dupuich	Feyenoord	(Belgium) Daring Club de Bruxelles	2–0	(Belgium) Léopold FC's field, Brussels	
1935	Tournoi de Bruxelles du Daring Club	Ajax	(France) Sochaux	2–1	(Belgium) Brussels	
1958	Benelux Cup	Feyenoord	(Belgium) Anderlecht	6–0	(Netherlands) De Kuip, Rotterdam	
1959	Benelux Cup	Feyenoord	(France) UA Sedan	4–2		
1961	Benelux Cup	PSV Eindhoven	(Italy) Vicenza	1–2	(Italy) Vicenza	
1973	Tournoi de Paris	Feyenoord	(Germany) Bayern Munich	1–1 (a.e.t.) (5–4 p)	(France) Parc des Princes, Paris	
1975	Amsterdam Tournament	Ajax	(Belgium) Molenbeek	5–2	(Netherlands) Olympic Stadium, Amsterdam	
1975	Joan Gamper Trophy	Feyenoord	(Spain) Barcelona	2–1	(Spain) Camp Nou, Barcelona	
1976	Amsterdam Tournament	Ajax	(Belgium) Anderlecht	1–3	(Netherlands) Olympic Stadium, Amsterdam	
1977	Amsterdam Tournament	AZ '67	(Netherlands) Ajax	3–0	(Netherlands) Olympic Stadium, Amsterdam	
1978	Amsterdam Tournament	Ajax	(Belgium) Anderlecht	2–2 (p)	(Netherlands) Olympic Stadium, Amsterdam	
1978	Bruges Matins	AZ '67	(England) Ipswich Town	2–0	(Belgium) Jan Breydel Stadium, Bruges	
1978	Rotterdam AD Tournament	Feyenoord	(England) Everton	3–1	(Netherlands) De Kuip, Rotterdam	
1979	Amsterdam Tournament	AZ '67	(Netherlands) Ajax	2–1	(Netherlands) Olympic Stadium, Amsterdam	
1979	Rotterdam AD Tournament	Feyenoord	(England) Ipswich Town	5–4 (a.e.t.)	(Netherlands) De Kuip, Rotterdam	
1979	Trofeo Santiago Bernabéu	Ajax	(Germany) Bayern Munich	2–0	(Spain) Santiago Bernabéu, Madrid	
1980	Amsterdam Tournament	Ajax	(Netherlands) AZ '67	2–1	(Netherlands) Olympic Stadium, Amsterdam	
1980	Trofeo Costa Verde	AZ '67	(Spain) Real Madrid	3–2	(Spain) El Molinón, Gijón	
1981	Trofeo Santiago Bernabéu	AZ '67	(Spain) Sporting Gijón	2–0	(Spain) Santiago Bernabéu, Madrid	
1982	Amsterdam Tournament	AZ '67	(Netherlands) Ajax	3–3 (p)	(Netherlands) Olympic Stadium, Amsterdam	
1982	Rotterdam AD Tournament	Feyenoord	(Scotland) Celtic	4–3	(Netherlands) De Kuip, Rotterdam	
1983	Amsterdam Tournament	Feyenoord	(Italy) Roma	1–1 (p)	(Netherlands) Olympic Stadium, Amsterdam	
1984	Amsterdam Tournament	Ajax	(Brazil) Atlético Mineiro	2–2 (p)	(Netherlands) Olympic Stadium, Amsterdam	
1984	Rotterdam AD Tournament	Feyenoord	(England) Manchester United	1–0	(Netherlands) De Kuip, Rotterdam	
1985	Amsterdam Tournament	Ajax	(Brazil) Atlético Mineiro	4–1	(Netherlands) Olympic Stadium, Amsterdam	
1986	Joan Gamper Trophy	PSV Eindhoven	(Spain) Barcelona	1–0	(Spain) Camp Nou, Barcelona	
1986	Rotterdam AD Tournament	Feyenoord	(Germany) Werder Bremen	1–3	(Netherlands) De Kuip, Rotterdam	
1989	Bruges Matins	PSV	(Soviet Union) Torpedo Moscow	0–1	(Belgium) Jan Breydel Stadium, Bruges	
1992	Joan Gamper Trophy	Feyenoord	(Spain) Barcelona	2–0	(Spain) Camp Nou, Barcelona	
1996	Umbro International Tournament	Ajax	(England) Chelsea	2–0	(England) City Ground, Nottingham	
2003	Peace Cup	PSV Eindhoven	(France) Lyon	1–0	(South Korea) Seoul World Cup Stadium, Seoul	
2005	Europe-America Tournament	Feyenoord	(Uruguay) Nacional	3–0	(China) Nanjing	
2006	Polar Cup	FC Groningen	(Netherlands Antilles) Deportivo Barber	2–1	(Netherlands Antilles) Ergilio Hato Stadium, Brievengat	
2007	UTS Polar Cup	FC Utrecht	(Brazil) Ferroviário AC	1–0	(Netherlands Antilles) Ergilio Hato Stadium, Brievengat	
2007	Russian Railways Cup	PSV Eindhoven	(Spain) Real Madrid	2–1	(Russia) RZD Arena, Moscow	
2008	Chippie Polar Cup	FC Groningen	Netherlands Antilles	4–2	(Netherlands Antilles) Ergilio Hato Stadium, Brievengat	
2010	Chippie Polar Cup	Ajax	(Netherlands) NEC	0–0 (4–3 p)	(Netherlands Antilles) Ergilio Hato Stadium, Brievengat	
2013	Multipost Polar Cup	ADO Den Haag	(Curaçao) Centro Dominguito	2–2 (4–3 p)	(Curaçao) Ergilio Hato Stadium, Brievengat	
2019	Interwetten Cup	FC Utrecht	(Germany) Fortuna Düsseldorf	1–0	(Germany) Hänsch-Arena, Meppen	

== Points by season ==
Points by season (UEFA coefficient)
Season	Points	League position (Note: The UEFA Country Ranking is used to display the strength of the league in Europe. The ranking is determined by the sum of the UEFA country coefficients collectively earned by the leagues's clubs over the last 5 years. Therefore, from 1955 until 1959 no position can be given.)
1955–56	2.000	
1956–57	0.000	
1957–58	6.000	
1958–59	0.000	
1959–60	5.000	12
1960–61	1.000	18 ▼
1961–62	3.500	16 ▲
1962–63	5.333	16
1963–64	3.666	13 ▲
1964–65	5.000	13
1965–66	1.000	12 ▲
1966–67	4.500	12
1967–68	2.500	17 ▼
1968–69	5.200	14 ▲
1969–70	9.500	12 ▲
1970–71	9.600	6 ▲
1971–72	8.400	4 ▲
1972–73	8.500	2 ▲
1973–74	7.500	2
1974–75	11.200	3 ▼
1975–76	8.000	2 ▲
1976–77	4.250	3 ▼
1977–78	12.500	2 ▲
1978–79	3.250	2
1979–80	7.250	5 ▼
1980–81	8.666	4 ▲
1981–82	3.800	3 ▲
1982–83	2.000	10 ▼
1983–84	3.833	12 ▼
1984–85	3.750	14 ▼
1985–86	2.600	19 ▼
1986–87	7.250	15 ▲
1987–88	9.200	8 ▲
1988–89	4.250	6 ▲
1989–90	3.200	8 ▼
1990–91	2.250	7 ▲
1991–92	8.600	6 ▲
1992–93	7.600	8 ▼
1993–94	2.600	9 ▼
1994–95	7.400	9
1995–96	12.500	5 ▲
1996–97	6.250	5
1997–98	6.833	5
1998–99	4.833	5
1999–2000	6.250	6 ▼
2000–01	6.083	6
2001–02	10.166	7 ▼
2002–03	6.166	8 ▼
2003–04	5.416	8
2004–05	12.000	7 ▲
2005–06	7.583	7
2006–07	8.214	8 ▼
2007–08	5.000	9 ▼
2008–09	6.333	8 ▲
2009–10	9.416	10 ▼
2010–11	11.166	9 ▲
2011–12	13.600	8 ▲
2012–13	4.214	9 ▼
2013–14	5.916	8 ▲
2014–15	6.083	9 ▼
2015–16	5.750	10 ▼
2016–17	9.100	13 ▼
2017–18	2.900	14 ▼
2018–19	8.600	11 ▲
2019–20	9.400	10 ▲
2020–21	9.200	7 ▲
2021–22	19.200	7
2022–23	13.500	6 ▲
2023–24	10.000	6
2024–25	15.250	6
