= István Kovács (referee) =

Romanian football referee (born 1984)

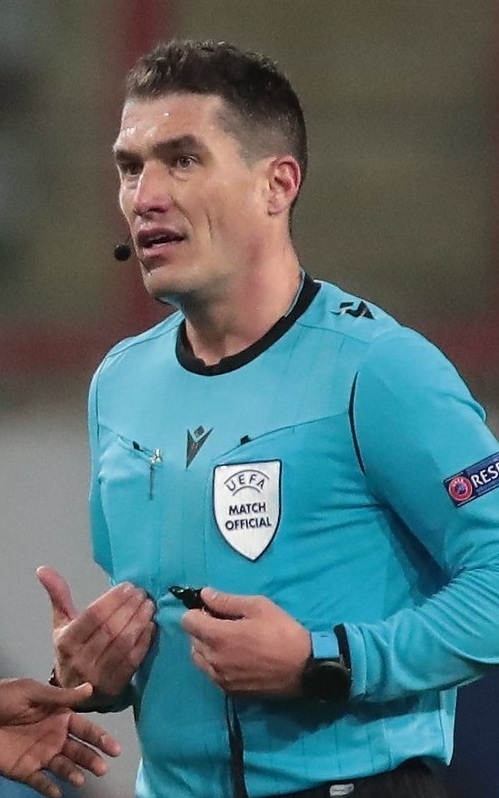
- Kovács in 2020
- Born: 16 September 1984 (age 42); Carei, Romania
- Other occupation: Physical education teacher

Domestic
Years	League	Role
2007–	Liga I	Referee

International
Years	League	Role
2010–	FIFA listed	Referee
2019–	UEFA Elite	Referee
2021–	FIFA listed	Video match official

István Kovács (born 16 September 1984) is a Romanian football referee who primarily officiates in the Liga I. He has been a full international for FIFA since 2018, and a UEFA elite referee since 2019.

== Career ==
Kovács was one of two Romanian referees selected to officiate in UEFA Euro 2020, the other being Ovidiu Hațegan. He was in charge of one group stage game, the Group D fixture between the Netherlands and North Macedonia on 21 June 2021 in Amsterdam, which ended in a 3–0 victory for the Dutch.

On 26 April 2022 he refereed the first leg of the UEFA Champions League semi-final between Manchester City and Real Madrid in Manchester, which City won 4–3. Because of the good performance, Kovács was praised by the media, especially for the advantage he allowed in the build-up to Bernardo Silva's goal. As a reward for his good performance, the UEFA Referees Committee chose him to officiate the 2022 UEFA Europa Conference League final between A.S. Roma and Feyenoord, the first ever final of the competition. Roma won the final in Albania 1–0 and became the first title holders of the UEFA Europa Conference League.

The same year, Kovács was selected for the 2022 FIFA World Cup, along with his compatriot assistant referees Vasile Marinescu and Mihai Artene. He wasn't ultimately picked as overall referee for any match, but he was the fourth official in eight fixtures.

On 19 January 2023 he refereed the final of the 25th Arabian Gulf Cup between Iraq and Oman. That same month, he was one of six match officials appointed for the 2022 FIFA Club World Cup in Morocco. On 7 February he oversaw the semi-final between Brazilian side Flamengo and Saudi Arabian side Al Hilal, which Al Hilal won 3–2.

In June 2023, Kovács was appointed as the fourth official for the UEFA Champions League final between Manchester City and Inter Milan, which City won 1–0.

In May 2024, he was selected by UEFA to referee the UEFA Europa League Final between Atalanta and Bayer Leverkusen, on 22 May in the Aviva Stadium in Dublin. Atalanta won the match 3–0, breaking Leverkusen's record-break winning streak. As expected, he was picked for UEFA Euro 2024, where he officiated two group stage fixtures–Slovenia vs. Serbia on 20 June, and Czech Republic vs. Turkey on 26 June. In the latter game, Kovács broke the European Championship record for the most cautions between both teams in a single match, handing out sixteen yellow cards and two reds. By sending off Czech midfielder Antonín Barák for a second bookable offence only 20 minutes into the match, he also broke the record for the fastest red card in the history of the European Championship. Czech striker Tomáš Chorý was shown a direct red card during a melée between the two teams after the end of the match.

In May 2025, Kovács was the referee in the 2025 UEFA Champions League final between Paris Saint-Germain and Inter Milan.

In June 2026, Kovács was selected to officiate milestone 1,000th FIFA World Cup match, Tunisia vs Japan at 2026 FIFA World Cup.

== Selected matches ==
UEFA Euro 2020 – Multiple hosts
Date	Match	Venue	Location	Round	Result
21 June 2021	North Macedonia – Netherlands	Johan Cruyff Arena	Amsterdam	Group stage	0–3
2022 UEFA Europa Conference League Final
Date	Match	Venue	Location	Round	Result
25 May 2022	Roma – Feyenoord	Arena Kombëtare	Tirana	Final	1–0
2024 UEFA Europa League Final
Date	Match	Venue	Location	Round	Result
22 May 2024	Atalanta – Bayer Leverkusen	Aviva Stadium	Dublin	Final	3–0
UEFA Euro 2024 - Germany
Date	Match	Venue	Location	Round	Result
20 June 2024	Slovenia – Serbia	Allianz Arena	Munich	Group stage	1–1
26 June 2024	Czech Republic – Turkey	Volksparkstadion	Hamburg	Group stage	1–2
2025 UEFA Champions League Final
Date	Match	Venue	Location	Round	Result
31 May 2025	Paris Saint-Germain – Inter Milan	Allianz Arena	Munich	Final	5–0
2026 FIFA World Cup - USA/Mexico/Canada
Date	Match	Venue	Location	Round	Result
20 June 2026	Tunisia – Japan	Estadio BBVA	Guadalupe	Group stage	0–4
27 June 2026	Jordan – Argentina	AT&T Stadium	Arlington	Group stage	1–3

== Personal life ==
Kovács is of Hungarian descent through his father and is also German through his maternal side. He holds Romanian and Hungarian passports. His younger brother, Szabolcs, is also a referee in the Romanian Liga I. Kovács is in a relationship with model Denisa Fazakas. Together, they have a son who was born around July 2024.

He was born in Carei, Satu Mare County, and currently resides in Cluj-Napoca. In recognition of his refereeing career, he became an honorary citizen of Carei in 2023.

== See also ==
- List of FIFA international referees

Sporting positions (Romania) Istvan Kovacs
Preceded by 2024 (Slovenia) Slavko Vinčić	UEFA Champions League Final Referee; 2025	Succeeded by 2026 (Germany) Daniel Siebert
Preceded by 2023 (England) Anthony Taylor	UEFA Europa League Final Referee; 2024	Succeeded by 2025 (Germany) Felix Zwayer
Preceded by No previous competition	UEFA Europa Conference League Final Referee; 2022	Succeeded by 2023 (Spain) Carlos del Cerro Grande
