= 1957–58 Benelux Cup =

Tournament details
- Dates: 16 October 1957 – 31 May 1958
- Teams: 6

Final positions
- Champions: (Netherlands) Feijenoord Rotterdam (1st title)
- Runners-up: (Belgium) R.S.C. Anderlecht

Tournament statistics
- Matches played: 13
- Goals scored: 67 (5.15 per match)

The 1957-58 Benelux Cup was won by Feijenoord Rotterdam in the final against RSC Anderlecht.

== Group stage ==
=== Group A ===
| # | Team | Pld | W | D | L | Pts | GF | GA |
|---|---|---|---|---|---|---|---|---|
| 1 | (Netherlands) Feijenoord Rotterdam | 4 | 3 | 0 | 1 | 6 | 14 | 4 |
| 2 | (Belgium) Beerschot | 4 | 3 | 0 | 1 | 6 | 13 | 6 |
| 3 | (Luxembourg) Red Boys Differdange | 4 | 0 | 0 | 4 | 0 | 4 | 21 |

=== Group B ===
| # | Team | Pld | W | D | L | Pts | GF | GA |
|---|---|---|---|---|---|---|---|---|
| 1 | (Belgium) RSC Anderlecht | 4 | 2 | 1 | 1 | 5 | 18 | 5 |
| 2 | (Netherlands) PSV Eindhoven | 4 | 2 | 1 | 1 | 5 | 7 | 13 |
| 3 | CA Spora Luxembourg | 4 | 0 | 2 | 2 | 2 | 5 | 12 |

== Final ==
31 May 1958

| Feijenoord Rotterdam (Netherlands) | 6–0 | (Belgium) RSC Anderlecht |
|---|---|---|
| Rijvers 10'; Van der Gijp 27', 43', 73'; Meijers 65'; Schouten 68' |

De Kuip, Rotterdam
Attendance: 22,000
