= AS Roma in European football =

Italian club in European football

- Club: AS Roma
- Seasons played: 47
- First entry: 1958–60 Inter-Cities Fairs Cup
- Latest entry: 2026–27 UEFA Champions League

Titles
- Conference League: 1: 2021–22
- Inter-Cities Fairs Cup: 1: 1960–61

These are the matches that Roma have played in European football competitions. The club's first entry into European football was the 1958–60 Inter-Cities Fairs Cup, with their first official entry in the 1969–70 European Cup Winners' Cup, a competition where it had an Italian record six-time appearances.

The club have played four UEFA finals. In the 1983–84 European Cup, their first entry in the competition, they lost to Liverpool on penalties at their own Stadio Olimpico, and in the 1990–91 UEFA Cup they lost the final 2–1 on aggregate to compatriots Inter Milan. They won the 2021–22 UEFA Europa Conference League by beating Feyenoord 1–0 in the final, and lost on penalties to Sevilla in the final of the 2022–23 UEFA Europa League.

== UEFA-organised seasonal competitions ==
Roma's score listed first.

=== European Cup / UEFA Champions League ===
Season	Round	Opposition	Home	Away	Aggregate	Ref.
1983–84	First round	(Sweden) IFK Göteborg	3–0	1–2	4–2	
1983–84	Second round	(Bulgaria) CSKA Sofia	1–0	1–0	2–0	
1983–84	Quarter-finals	(East Germany) Berliner Dynamo	3–0	1–2	4–2	
1983–84	Semi-finals	(Scotland) Dundee United	3–0	0–2	3–2	
1983–84	Final	(England) Liverpool	1–1 (a.e.t.) (2–4 p)			
2001–02	First group stage	(Spain) Real Madrid	1–2	1–1	2nd	
2001–02	First group stage	(Belgium) Anderlecht	1–1	0–0	2nd	
2001–02	First group stage	(Russia) Lokomotiv Moscow	2–1	1–0	2nd	
2001–02	Second group stage	(Turkey) Galatasaray	1–1	1–1	3rd	
2001–02	Second group stage	(England) Liverpool	0–0	0–2	3rd	
2001–02	Second group stage	(Spain) Barcelona	3–0	1–1	3rd	
2002–03	First group stage	(Spain) Real Madrid	0–3	1–0	2nd	
2002–03	First group stage	(Greece) AEK Athens	1–1	0–0	2nd	
2002–03	First group stage	(Belgium) Genk	0–0	1–0	2nd	
2002–03	Second group stage	(England) Arsenal	1–3	1–1	4th	
2002–03	Second group stage	(Netherlands) Ajax	1–1	1–2	4th	
2002–03	Second group stage	(Spain) Valencia	0–1	3–0	4th	
2004–05	Group stage	(Ukraine) Dynamo Kyiv	0–3 (f)	0–2	4th	
2004–05	Group stage	(Spain) Real Madrid	0–3	2–4	4th	
2004–05	Group stage	(Germany) Bayer Leverkusen	1–1	1–3	4th	
2006–07	Group stage	(Ukraine) Shakhtar Donetsk	4–0	0–1	2nd	
2006–07	Group stage	(Spain) Valencia	1–0	1–2	2nd	
2006–07	Group stage	(Greece) Olympiacos	1–1	1–0	2nd	
2006–07	Round of 16	(France) Lyon	0–0	2–0	2–0	
2006–07	Quarter-finals	(England) Manchester United	2–1	1–7	3–8	
2007–08	Group stage	(Ukraine) Dynamo Kyiv	2–0	4–1	2nd	
2007–08	Group stage	(England) Manchester United	1–1	0–1	2nd	
2007–08	Group stage	(Portugal) Sporting CP	2–1	2–2	2nd	
2007–08	Round of 16	(Spain) Real Madrid	2–1	2–1	4–2	
2007–08	Quarter-finals	(England) Manchester United	0–2	0–1	0–3	
2008–09	Group stage	(Romania) CFR Cluj	1–2	3–1	1st	
2008–09	Group stage	(France) Bordeaux	2–0	3–1	1st	
2008–09	Group stage	(England) Chelsea	3–1	0–1	1st	
2008–09	Round of 16	(England) Arsenal	1–0 (a.e.t.)	0–1	1–1 (6–7 p)	
2010–11	Group stage	(Germany) Bayern Munich	3–2	0–2	2nd	
2010–11	Group stage	(Romania) CFR Cluj	2–1	1–1	2nd	
2010–11	Group stage	(Switzerland) Basel	1–3	3–2	2nd	
2010–11	Round of 16	(Ukraine) Shakhtar Donetsk	2–3	0–3	2–6	
2014–15	Group stage	(Russia) CSKA Moscow	5–1	1–1	3rd	
2014–15	Group stage	(England) Manchester City	0–2	1–1	3rd	
2014–15	Group stage	(Germany) Bayern Munich	1–7	0–2	3rd	
2015–16	Group stage	(Spain) Barcelona	1–1	1–6	2nd	
2015–16	Group stage	(Belarus) BATE Borisov	0–0	2–3	2nd	
2015–16	Group stage	(Germany) Bayer Leverkusen	3–2	4–4	2nd	
2015–16	Round of 16	(Spain) Real Madrid	0–2	0–2	0–4	
2016–17	Play-off round	(Portugal) Porto	0–3	1–1	1–4	
2017–18	Group stage	(England) Chelsea	3–0	3–3	1st	
2017–18	Group stage	(Spain) Atlético Madrid	0–0	0–2	1st	
2017–18	Group stage	(Azerbaijan) Qarabağ	1–0	2–1	1st	
2017–18	Round of 16	(Ukraine) Shakhtar Donetsk	1–0	1–2	2–2 (a)	
2017–18	Quarter-finals	(Spain) Barcelona	3–0	1–4	4–4 (a)	
2017–18	Semi-finals	(England) Liverpool	4–2	2–5	6–7	
2018–19	Group stage	(Spain) Real Madrid	0–2	0–3	2nd	
2018–19	Group stage	(Russia) CSKA Moscow	3–0	2–1	2nd	
2018–19	Group stage	(Czech Republic) Viktoria Plzeň	5–0	1–2	2nd	
2018–19	Round of 16	(Portugal) Porto	2–1	1–3 (a.e.t.)	3–4	
2026–27	League phase	(Turkey) Fenerbahçe	—N/a	1–1		
2026–27	League phase	(Spain) Real Madrid	3–4	—N/a		
2026–27	League phase	(Slovakia) Slovan Bratislava	4–0	—N/a		
2026–27	League phase	(England) Manchester United	—N/a	2–3		
2026–27	League phase	(France) Paris Saint-Germain	—N/a			
2026–27	League phase	(Portugal) Sporting CP		—N/a		
2026–27	League phase	(Greece) AEK Athens	—N/a			
2026–27	League phase	(France) Lille		—N/a		

=== European Cup Winners' Cup ===
Season	Round	Opposition	Home	Away	Aggregate	Ref.
1969–70	First round	(Northern Ireland) Ards	3–1	0–0	3–1	
1969–70	Second round	(Netherlands) PSV Eindhoven	1–0	0–1	1–1 (c)	
1969–70	Quarter-finals	(Turkey) Göztepe	2–0	0–0	2–0	
1969–70	Semi-finals	(Poland) Górnik Zabrze	1–1	2–2	4–4 (PO 1–1, c)	
1980–81	First round	(East Germany) Carl Zeiss Jena	3–0	0–4	3–4	
1981–82	First round	(Northern Ireland) Ballymena United	4–0	2–0	6–0	
1981–82	Second round	(Portugal) Porto	0–0	0–2	0–2	
1984–85	First round	(Romania) Steaua București	1–0	0–0	1–0	
1984–85	Second round	(Wales) Wrexham	2–0	1–0	3–0	
1984–85	Quarter-finals	(West Germany) Bayern Munich	1–2	0–2	1–4	
1986–87	First round	(Spain) Zaragoza	2–0	0–2 (a.e.t.)	2–2 (3–4 p)	
1991–92	First round	(Russia) CSKA Moscow	0–1	2–1	2–2 (a)	
1991–92	Second round	(Finland) Ilves Tampere	5–2	1–1	6–3	
1991–92	Quarter-finals	(France) Monaco	0–0	0–1	0–1	

=== UEFA Cup / UEFA Europa League ===
Season	Round	Opposition	Home	Away	Aggregate	Ref.
1975–76	First round	(Bulgaria) Dunav Ruse	2–0	0–1	2–1	
1975–76	Second round	(Sweden) Öster	2–0	0–1	2–1	
1975–76	Third round	(Belgium) Club Brugge	0–1	0–1	0–2	
1982–83	First round	(England) Ipswich Town	3–0	1–3	4–3	
1982–83	Second round	(Sweden) IFK Norrköping	1–0	0–1 (a.e.t.)	1–1 (4–2 p)	
1982–83	Third round	(West Germany) 1. FC Köln	2–0	0–1	2–1	
1982–83	Quarter-finals	(Portugal) Benfica	1–2	1–1	2–3	
1988–89	First round	(West Germany) 1. FC Nürnberg	1–2	3–1 (a.e.t.)	4–3	
1988–89	Second round	(Socialist Federal Republic of Yugoslavia) Partizan	2–0	2–4	4–4 (a)	
1988–89	Third round	(East Germany) Dynamo Dresden	0–2	0–2	0–4	
1990–91	First round	(Portugal) Benfica	1–0	1–0	2–0	
1990–91	Second round	(Spain) Valencia	2–1	1–1	3–2	
1990–91	Third round	(France) Bordeaux	5–0	2–0	7–0	
1990–91	Quarter-finals	(Belgium) Anderlecht	3–0	3–2	6–2	
1990–91	Semi-finals	(Denmark) Brøndby	2–1	0–0	2–1	
1990–91	Final	(Italy) Internazionale	1–0	0–2	1–2	
1992–93	First round	(Austria) Wacker Innsbruck	1–0	4–1	5–1	
1992–93	Second round	(Switzerland) Grasshopper	3–0	3–4	6–4	
1992–93	Third round	(Turkey) Galatasaray	3–1	2–3	5–3	
1992–93	Quarter-finals	(Germany) Borussia Dortmund	1–0	0–2	1–2	
1995–96	First round	(Switzerland) Neuchâtel Xamax	4–0	1–1	5–1	
1995–96	Second round	(Belgium) Eendracht Aalst	4–0	0–0	4–0	
1995–96	Third round	(Denmark) Brøndby	3–1	1–2	4–3	
1995–96	Quarter-finals	(Czech Republic) Slavia Prague	3–1	0–2	3–3 (a)	
1996–97	First round	(Russia) Dynamo Moscow	3–0	3–1	6–1	
1996–97	Second round	(Germany) Karlsruher SC	2–1	0–3	2–4	
1998–99	First round	(Denmark) Silkeborg	1–0	2–0	3–0	
1998–99	Second round	(England) Leeds United	1–0	0–0	1–0	
1998–99	Third round	(Switzerland) Zürich	1–0	2–2	3–2	
1998–99	Quarter-finals	(Spain) Atlético Madrid	1–2	1–2	2–4	
1999–2000	First round	(Portugal) Vitória de Setúbal	7–0	0–1	7–1	
1999–2000	Second round	(Sweden) IFK Göteborg	1–0	2–0	3–0	
1999–2000	Third round	(England) Newcastle United	1–0	0–0	1–0	
1999–2000	Fourth round	(England) Leeds United	0–0	0–1	0–1	
2000–01	First round	(Slovenia) Gorica	7–0	4–1	11–1	
2000–01	Second round	(Portugal) Boavista	1–1	1–0	2–1	
2000–01	Third round	(Germany) Hamburger SV	1–0	3–0	4–0	
2000–01	Fourth round	(England) Liverpool	0–2	1–0	1–2	
2003–04	First round	(North Macedonia) Vardar	4–0	1–1	5–1	
2003–04	Second round	(Croatia) Hajduk Split	1–0	1–1	2–1	
2003–04	Round of 32	(Turkey) Gaziantepspor	2–0	0–1	2–1	
2003–04	Round of 16	(Spain) Villarreal	2–1	0–2	2–3	
2005–06	First round	(Greece) Aris	5–1	0–0	5–1	
2005–06	Group stage	(Norway) Tromsø	—N/a	2–1	2nd	
2005–06	Group stage	(France) Strasbourg	1–1	—N/a	2nd	
2005–06	Group stage	(Serbia and Montenegro) Red Star Belgrade	—N/a	1–3	2nd	
2005–06	Group stage	(Switzerland) Basel	3–1	—N/a	2nd	
2005–06	Round of 32	(Belgium) Club Brugge	2–1	2–1	4–2	
2005–06	Round of 16	(England) Middlesbrough	2–1	0–1	2–2 (a)	
2009–10	Third qualifying round	(Belgium) Gent	3–1	7–1	10–2	
2009–10	Play-off round	(Slovakia) Košice	7–1	3–3	10–4	
2009–10	Group stage	(Switzerland) Basel	2–1	0–2	1st	
2009–10	Group stage	(Bulgaria) CSKA Sofia	2–0	3–0	1st	
2009–10	Group stage	(England) Fulham	2–1	1–1	1st	
2009–10	Round of 32	(Greece) Panathinaikos	2–3	2–3	4–6	
2011–12	Play-off round	(Slovakia) Slovan Bratislava	1–1	0–1	1–2	
2014–15	Round of 32	(Netherlands) Feyenoord	1–1	2–1	3–2	
2014–15	Round of 16	(Italy) Fiorentina	0–3	1–1	1–4	
2016–17	Group stage	(Czech Republic) Viktoria Plzeň	4–1	1–1	1st	
2016–17	Group stage	(Romania) Astra Giurgiu	4–0	0–0	1st	
2016–17	Group stage	Austria Wien	3–3	4–2	1st	
2016–17	Round of 32	(Spain) Villarreal	0–1	4–0	4–1	
2016–17	Round of 16	(France) Lyon	2–1	2–4	4–5	
2019–20	Group stage	(Turkey) İstanbul Başakşehir	4–0	3–0	2nd	
2019–20	Group stage	(Austria) Wolfsberger AC	2–2	1–1	2nd	
2019–20	Group stage	(Germany) Borussia Mönchengladbach	1–1	1–2	2nd	
2019–20	Round of 32	(Belgium) Gent	1–0	1–1	2–1	
2019–20	Round of 16	(Spain) Sevilla	0–2			
2020–21	Group stage	(Switzerland) Young Boys	3–1	2–1	1st	
2020–21	Group stage	(Romania) CFR Cluj	5–0	2–0	1st	
2020–21	Group stage	(Bulgaria) CSKA Sofia	0–0	1–3	1st	
2020–21	Round of 32	(Portugal) Braga	3–1	2–0	5–1	
2020–21	Round of 16	(Ukraine) Shakhtar Donetsk	3–0	2–1	5–1	
2020–21	Quarter-finals	(Netherlands) Ajax	1–1	2–1	3–2	
2020–21	Semi-finals	(England) Manchester United	3–2	2–6	5–8	
2022–23	Group stage	(Bulgaria) Ludogorets Razgrad	3–1	1–2	2nd	
2022–23	Group stage	(Finland) HJK	3–0	2–1	2nd	
2022–23	Group stage	(Spain) Real Betis	1–2	1–1	2nd	
2022–23	Knockout round play-offs	(Austria) Red Bull Salzburg	2–0	0–1	2–1	
2022–23	Round of 16	(Spain) Real Sociedad	2–0	0–0	2–0	
2022–23	Quarter-finals	(Netherlands) Feyenoord	4–1 (a.e.t.)	0–1	4–2	
2022–23	Semi-finals	(Germany) Bayer Leverkusen	1–0	0–0	1–0	
2022–23	Final	(Spain) Sevilla	1–1 (a.e.t.) (1–4 p)			
2023–24	Group stage	(Moldova) Sheriff Tiraspol	3–0	2–1	2nd	
2023–24	Group stage	(Switzerland) Servette	4–0	1–1	2nd	
2023–24	Group stage	(Czech Republic) Slavia Prague	2–0	0–2	2nd	
2023–24	Knockout round play-offs	(Netherlands) Feyenoord	1–1 (a.e.t.)	1–1	2–2 (4–2 p)	
2023–24	Round of 16	(England) Brighton & Hove Albion	4–0	0–1	4–1	
2023–24	Quarter-finals	(Italy) Milan	2–1	1–0	3–1	
2023–24	Semi-finals	(Germany) Bayer Leverkusen	0–2	2–2	2–4	
2024–25	League phase	(Spain) Athletic Bilbao	1–1	—N/a	15th	
2024–25	League phase	(Sweden) IF Elfsborg	—N/a	0–1	15th	
2024–25	League phase	(Ukraine) Dynamo Kyiv	1–0	—N/a	15th	
2024–25	League phase	(Belgium) Union Saint-Gilloise	—N/a	1–1	15th	
2024–25	League phase	(England) Tottenham Hotspur	—N/a	2–2	15th	
2024–25	League phase	(Portugal) Braga	3–0	—N/a	15th	
2024–25	League phase	(Netherlands) AZ	—N/a	0–1	15th	
2024–25	League phase	(Germany) Eintracht Frankfurt	2–0	—N/a	15th	
2024–25	Knockout phase play-offs	(Portugal) Porto	3–2	1–1	4–3	
2024–25	Round of 16	(Spain) Athletic Bilbao	2–1	1–3	3–4	
2025–26	League phase	(France) Nice	—N/a	2–1	8th	
2025–26	League phase	(France) Lille	0–1	—N/a	8th	
2025–26	League phase	(Czech Republic) Viktoria Plzeň	1–2	—N/a	8th	
2025–26	League phase	(Scotland) Rangers	—N/a	2–0	8th	
2025–26	League phase	(Denmark) Midtjylland	2–1	—N/a	8th	
2025–26	League phase	(Scotland) Celtic	—N/a	3–0	8th	
2025–26	League phase	(Germany) VfB Stuttgart	2–0	—N/a	8th	
2025–26	League phase	(Greece) Panathinaikos	—N/a	1–1	8th	
2025–26	Round of 16	(Italy) Bologna	3–4 (a.e.t.)	1–1	4–5	

=== UEFA Europa Conference League ===
Season	Round	Opposition	Home	Away	Aggregate	Ref.
2021–22	Play-off round	(Turkey) Trabzonspor	3–0	2–1	5–1	
2021–22	Group stage	(Ukraine) Zorya Luhansk	4–0	3–0	1st	
2021–22	Group stage	(Bulgaria) CSKA Sofia	5–1	3–2	1st	
2021–22	Group stage	(Norway) Bodø/Glimt	2–2	1–6	1st	
2021–22	Round of 16	(Netherlands) Vitesse	1–1	1–0	2–1	
2021–22	Quarter-finals	(Norway) Bodø/Glimt	4–0	1–2	5–2	
2021–22	Semi-finals	(England) Leicester City	1–0	1–1	2–1	
2021–22	Final	(Netherlands) Feyenoord	1–0			

== FIFA-only recognized seasonal competitions ==
=== Inter-Cities Fairs Cup ===
Season	Round	Opposition	Home	Away	Aggregate
1958–60	First round	(West Germany) Hannover 96	1–1	3–1	4–2
1958–60	Quarter-finals	(Belgium) Union Saint-Gilloise	1–1	0–2	1–3
1960–61	First round	(Belgium) Union Saint-Gilloise	4–1	0–0	4–1
1960–61	Quarter-finals	(West Germany) Cologne XI	0–2	2–0	6–3 (PO 4–1)
1960–61	Semi-finals	(Scotland) Hibernian	3–3	2–2	11–5 (PO 6–0)
1960–61	Final	(England) Birmingham City	2–0	2–2	4–2
1961–62	First round	Given bye as holders			
1961–62	Second round	(England) Sheffield Wednesday	1–0	0–4	1–4
1962–63	First round	(Turkey) Altay	3–2	10–1	13–3
1962–63	Second round	(Spain) Zaragoza	1–2	4–2	5–4
1962–63	Quarter-finals	(Socialist Federal Republic of Yugoslavia) Red Star Belgrade	3–0	0–2	3–2
1962–63	Semi-finals	(Spain) Valencia	1–0	0–3	1–3
1963–64	First round	(West Germany) Hertha BSC	2–0	3–1	5–1
1963–64	Second round	(Portugal) Belenenses	2–1	1–0	3–1
1963–64	Quarter-finals	(West Germany) 1. FC Köln	3–1	0–4	3–5
1964–65	First round	(Greece) Aris	3–0	0–0	3–0
1964–65	Second round	(Socialist Federal Republic of Yugoslavia) NK Zagreb	1–0	1–1	2–1
1964–65	Third round	(Hungary) Ferencváros	1–2	0–1	1–3
1965–66	First round	(England) Chelsea	0–0	1–4	1–4

== UEFA coefficient rankings ==
=== UEFA club coefficient ranking ===
As of 29 August 2024

Rank	Club	Points
3	(Germany) Bayern Munich	114.000
4	(England) Liverpool	102.000
5	(Italy) Roma	93.000
6	(France) Paris Saint-Germain	91.000
7	(Germany) Borussia Dortmund	85.000

=== UEFA rankings since 2004 ===
As of 1 June 2024

Season	Ranking	Movement	Points	Change
2023–24	6	▲ +4	101.000	▲ +4.000
2022–23	10	▲ +1	97.000	▼ –3.000
2021–22	11	▲ +2	100.000	▲ +10.000
2020–21	13	▲ +4	90.000	▲ +10.000
2019–20	17	▼ –3	80.000	▼ –1.000
2018–19	14	▲ +7	81.000	▲ +17.000
2017–18	21	▲ +16	64.000	▲ +25.000
2016–17	37	▲ +14	39.000	▲ +11.500
2015–16	51	▼ –5	27.500	▼ –22.000
2014–15	46	▲ +9	49.500	▲ +13.000
2013–14	55	▼ –12	26.500	▼ –14.000
2012–13	43	▼ –17	40.500	▼ –17.000
2011–12	26	▼ –10	57.500	▼ –15.500
2010–11	16	▼ –2	73.000	▲ +2.000
2009–10	14	0	71.000	▲ +5.000
2008–09	14	▲ +2	66.000	▲ +4.000
2007–08	16	0	62.000	▲ +5.000
2006–07	16	▲ +1	57.000	▲ +3.000
2005–06	17	▼ –1	54.000	▲ +1.000
2004–05	16	0	53.000	0.000

=== Football Club Elo Rating ===
As of 6 September 2024

Rank	Club	Points
19	(Spain) Girona	1801
20	(Netherlands) PSV Eindhoven	1797
21	(Italy) Roma	1793
22	(Germany) VfB Stuttgart	1791
23	(England) Tottenham Hotspur	1791

== Overall record ==
=== By competition ===
As of 3 November 2026.

Competition	Pld	W	D	L	GF	GA	GD	Win%
European Champions' Cup / UEFA Champions League	115	42	28	45	158	168	−10	36.52
European Cup Winners' Cup	29	12	9	8	34	24	+10	41.38
UEFA Cup / UEFA Europa League	196	102	42	52	335	192	+143	52.04
UEFA Europa Conference League	15	10	3	2	33	16	+17	66.67
Total	355	166	82	107	560	400	+160	46.76

Source: UEFA.com
Pld = Matches played; W = Matches won; D = Matches drawn; L = Matches lost; GF = Goals for; GA = Goals against; GD = Goal difference.

== See also ==
- Football in Italy
- European Club Association
