= 2022 UEFA Europa Conference League final =

Football match

- Match programme cover
- Event: 2021–22 UEFA Europa Conference League
Roma	Feyenoord
(Italy)	(Netherlands)
1	0
- Date: 25 May 2022
- Venue: Arena Kombëtare, Tirana
- Man of the Match: Chris Smalling (Roma)
- Referee: István Kovács (Romania)
- Attendance: 19,597
- Weather: Sunny; 23 °C (73 °F); 51% humidity

The 2022 UEFA Europa Conference League final was the final match of the 2021–22 UEFA Europa Conference League, the first season of Europe's tertiary club football tournament organised by UEFA. It was played on 25 May 2022 at the Arena Kombëtare in Tirana, Albania, between Italian club Roma and Dutch club Feyenoord.

Roma won the match 1–0 to secure the inaugural UEFA Europa Conference League title, the first club from Italy to win a UEFA competition in 12 years. As they had already qualified for the group stage of the 2022–23 UEFA Europa League via their domestic league performance, that competition's access list was rebalanced, with Feyenoord qualifying for the group stage instead of play-off round as the third place in the 2021–22 Eredivisie. If Roma had not qualified for the Champions League or the Europa League through their league performance, they would have received a place in the Europa League group stage instead.

== Venue ==
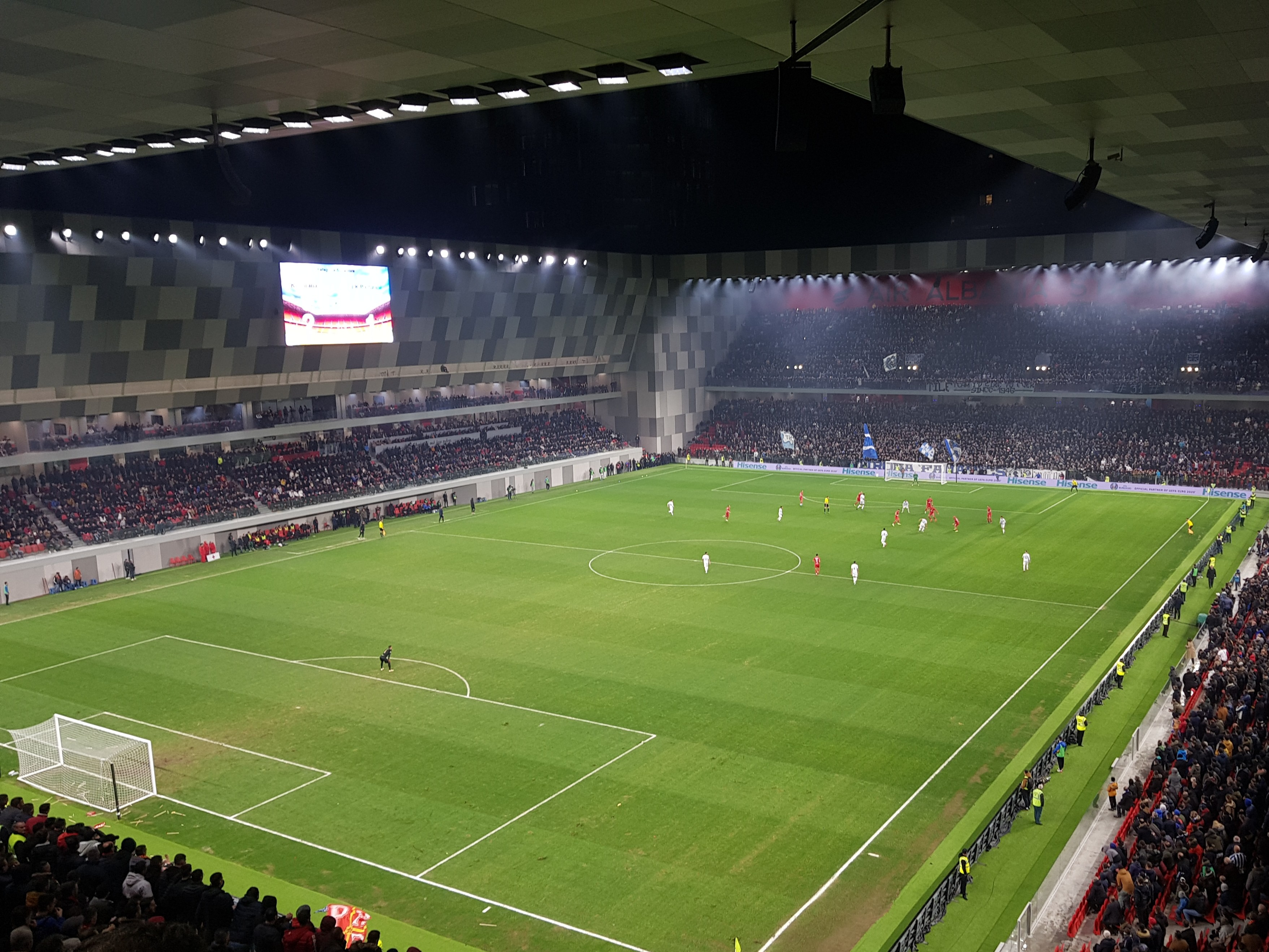
The Arena Kombëtare in Tirana hosted the final.

The match was the first UEFA competition final to be played in Albania. The 21,690-seat Arena Kombëtare is the home stadium of the Albania national team, as well as clubs Dinamo Tirana and Partizani. Construction of the stadium began in 2016 and was completed by November 2019.

=== Host selection ===
A bidding process was launched by UEFA to select the venues of the finals of the UEFA Europa Conference League in 2022 and 2023. Associations interested in hosting one of the finals had until 20 February 2020 to submit bid dossiers.

Bidding associations for 2022 UEFA Europa Conference League Final
Association	Stadium	City	Capacity
Albania	Arena Kombëtare	Tirana	22,500
France	Stade Geoffroy-Guichard	Saint-Étienne	41,965
Greece	Pankritio Stadium	Heraklion	26,240
North Macedonia	Toše Proeski Arena	Skopje	33,460

Arena Kombëtare was selected by the UEFA Executive Committee during their meeting on 3 December 2020.

== Background ==
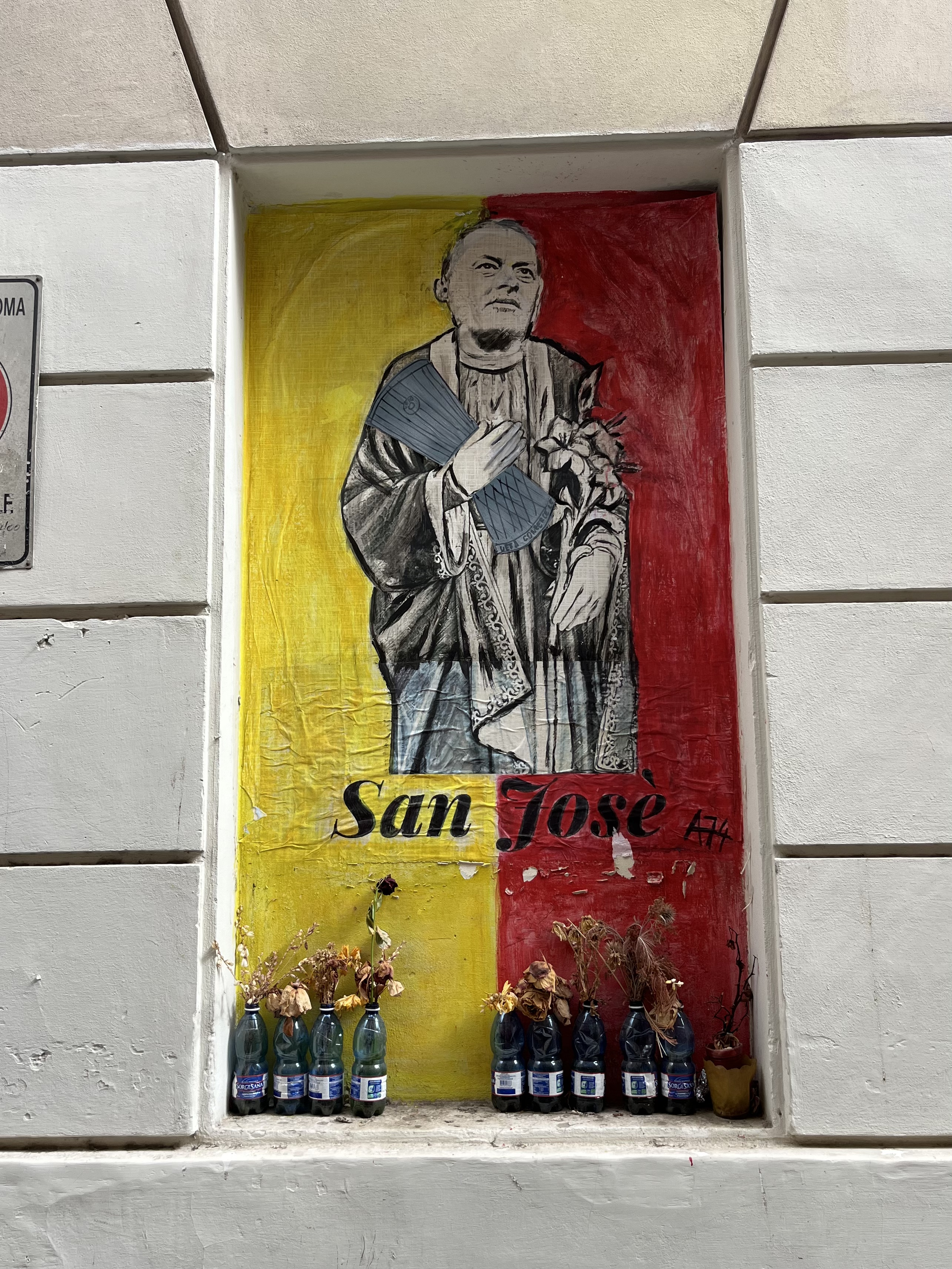
A graffito in honour of Jose Mourinho in the streets of Rome

This was Roma's third final in a major UEFA competition, having lost the 1984 European Cup final to Liverpool and the 1991 UEFA Cup final to fellow Italian club Inter Milan, who were the most recent Italian club to reach a European final – losing in the 2020 UEFA Europa League final. Roma was seeking to win their first trophy since the 2007–08 Coppa Italia, and a first European title for an Italian side since Inter won the 2010 UEFA Champions League final. Their head coach José Mourinho, having become the first manager to reach European finals with four different clubs – including the aforementioned 2010 Champions League final, was seeking to become only the third manager – after Udo Lattek and Giovanni Trapattoni – to have won all three existing major European trophies, and the first to achieve the UEFA treble by winning the European Champion Clubs' Cup/UEFA Champions League, UEFA Cup/Europa League, and UEFA Europa Conference League (in place of the now-defunct UEFA Cup Winners' Cup).

This was Feyenoord's fourth final in a major UEFA competition, having won the 1970 European Cup final and both the 1974 and 2002 UEFA Cup finals. The first Dutch club to reach a European final since their rivals Ajax lost the 2017 UEFA Europa League final to Mourinho's Manchester United and the most recent to win a European title, they were seeking to join Juventus, Ajax, Bayern Munich, Chelsea and Manchester United as the only clubs to have won all three existing major European trophies, and the first to achieve the UEFA treble by winning the European Champion Clubs' Cup/UEFA Champions League, UEFA Cup/Europa League and UEFA Europa Conference League (again in place of the Cup Winners' Cup). Their head coach Arne Slot was seeking to become the first Dutch to win a European trophy since Dick Advocaat with Zenit Saint Petersburg in the 2008 UEFA Super Cup.

The two sides previously met twice in European competitions, in the 2014–15 UEFA Europa League round of 32, with Roma won one and drew one.

== Route to the final ==
Note: In all results below, the score of the finalist is given first (H: home; A: away).

(Italy) Roma				Round	(Netherlands) Feyenoord			
Opponent	Agg.	1st leg	2nd leg	Qualifying phase	Opponent	Agg.	1st leg	2nd leg
Bye				Second qualifying round	(Kosovo) Drita	3–2	0–0 (A)	3–2 (H)
Bye				Third qualifying round	(Switzerland) Luzern	6–0	3–0 (A)	3–0 (H)
(Turkey) Trabzonspor	5–1	2–1 (A)	3–0 (H)	Play-off round	(Sweden) IF Elfsborg	6–3	5–0 (H)	1–3 (A)
Opponent	Result			Group stage	Opponent	Result		
(Bulgaria) CSKA Sofia	5–1 (H)			Matchday 1	(Israel) Maccabi Haifa	0–0 (A)		
(Ukraine) Zorya Luhansk	3–0 (A)			Matchday 2	(Czech Republic) Slavia Prague	2–1 (H)		
(Norway) Bodø/Glimt	1–6 (A)			Matchday 3	(Germany) Union Berlin	3–1 (H)		
(Norway) Bodø/Glimt	2–2 (H)			Matchday 4	(Germany) Union Berlin	2–1 (A)		
(Ukraine) Zorya Luhansk	4–0 (H)			Matchday 5	(Czech Republic) Slavia Prague	2–2 (A)		
(Bulgaria) CSKA Sofia	3–2 (A)			Matchday 6	(Israel) Maccabi Haifa	2–1 (H)		
Group C winners: Pos / Team / Pld / Pts; 1 / (Italy) Roma / 6 / 13; 2 / (Norway) Bodø/Glimt / 6 / 12; 3 / (Ukraine) Zorya Luhansk / 6 / 7; 4 / (Bulgaria) CSKA Sofia / 6 / 1; Source: UEFA				Final standings	Group E winners: Pos / Team / Pld / Pts; 1 / (Netherlands) Feyenoord / 6 / 14; 2 / (Czech Republic) Slavia Prague / 6 / 8; 3 / (Germany) Union Berlin / 6 / 7; 4 / (Israel) Maccabi Haifa / 6 / 4; Source: UEFA			
Opponent	Agg.	1st leg	2nd leg	Knockout phase	Opponent	Agg.	1st leg	2nd leg
(Netherlands) Vitesse	2–1	1–0 (A)	1–1 (H)	Round of 16	(Serbia) Partizan	8–3	5–2 (A)	3–1 (H)
(Norway) Bodø/Glimt	5–2	1–2 (A)	4–0 (H)	Quarter-finals	(Czech Republic) Slavia Prague	6–4	3–3 (H)	3–1 (A)
(England) Leicester City	2–1	1–1 (A)	1–0 (H)	Semi-finals	(France) Marseille	3–2	3–2 (H)	0–0 (A)

== Pre-match ==
=== Identity ===
The logo of the 2022 UEFA Europa Conference League Final was unveiled at the group stage draw on 27 August 2021 in Istanbul.

=== Ambassador ===
The ambassador for the final was former Albanian international Lorik Cana.

=== Officials ===
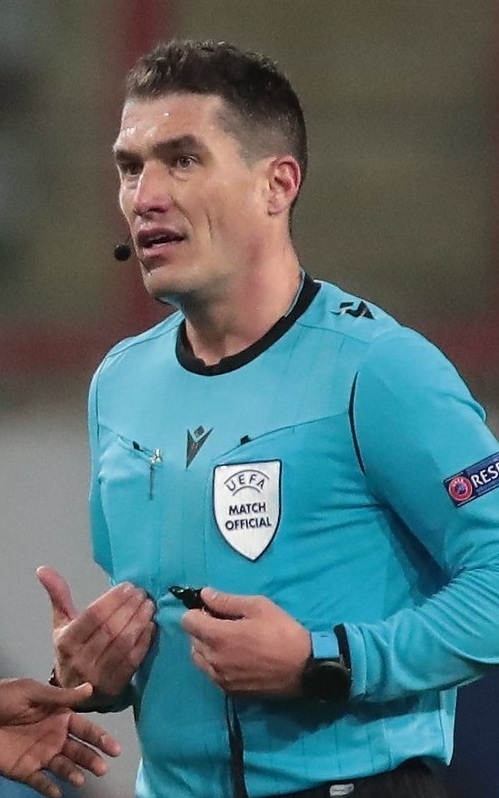
Romanian referee István Kovács officiated the final.

On 11 May 2022, UEFA announced Romanian István Kovács, a FIFA referee since 2010, would officiate the final. Kovács officiated six matches in the 2021–22 Champions League, three matches in the 2021–22 Europa League and one group stage fixture in the 2021–22 Europa Conference League season. He served as a referee at UEFA Euro 2020, where he officiated one group stage match. He also was a referee at the 2014 UEFA European Under-19 Championship, 2019 UEFA European Under-21 Championship and 2019 FIFA U-17 World Cup. He was joined by his fellow countrymen Vasile Marinescu and Ovidiu Artene as assistant referees. Sandro Schärer of Switzerland served as the fourth official, while German Marco Fritz was appointed as the video assistant referee. Fritz's compatriots Christian Dingert and Bastian Dankert served as the assistant and support VAR officials, respectively.

== Match ==
=== Details ===
The "home" team (for administrative purposes) was determined by an additional draw held after the quarter-final and semi-final draws.

25 May 2022
21:00 UTC+2

Roma (Italy)	1–0	(Netherlands) Feyenoord
Zaniolo 32'	Report

Arena Kombëtare, Tirana
Attendance: 19,597
Referee: István Kovács (Romania)

Roma	Feyenoord

GK	1	(Portugal) Rui Patrício	(yellow card) 84'
CB	23	(Italy) Gianluca Mancini
CB	6	(England) Chris Smalling
CB	3	(Brazil) Roger Ibañez
RWB	2	(Netherlands) Rick Karsdorp		(substituted off) 89'
LWB	59	(Poland) Nicola Zalewski	(yellow card) 66'	(substituted off) 67'
DM	77	(Armenia) Henrikh Mkhitaryan		(substituted off) 17'
DM	4	(Italy) Bryan Cristante
AM	22	(Italy) Nicolò Zaniolo		(substituted off) 67'
AM	7	(Italy) Lorenzo Pellegrini (c)	(yellow card) 37'
CF	9	(England) Tammy Abraham		(substituted off) 89'
Substitutes:
GK	87	(Brazil) Daniel Fuzato
DF	5	(Uruguay) Matías Viña		(substituted on) 89'
DF	15	(England) Ainsley Maitland-Niles
DF	24	(Albania) Marash Kumbulla
DF	37	(Italy) Leonardo Spinazzola	(yellow card) 90+4'	(substituted on) 67'
MF	17	(France) Jordan Veretout		(substituted on) 67'
MF	27	(Portugal) Sérgio Oliveira		(substituted on) 17'
MF	52	(Italy) Edoardo Bove
FW	11	(Spain) Carles Pérez
FW	14	(Uzbekistan) Eldor Shomurodov		(substituted on) 89'
FW	64	(Ghana) Felix Afena-Gyan
FW	92	(Italy) Stephan El Shaarawy
Other disciplinary actions:
TS	(Italy) Salvatore Foti		(yellow card) 59'
Manager:
(Portugal) José Mourinho

GK	1	(Netherlands) Justin Bijlow (c)
RB	3	(Netherlands) Lutsharel Geertruida
CB	18	(Austria) Gernot Trauner	(yellow card) 25'	(substituted off) 74'
CB	4	(Argentina) Marcos Senesi
LB	5	(Netherlands) Tyrell Malacia		(substituted off) 88'
CM	26	(Netherlands) Guus Til		(substituted off) 59'
CM	17	(Norway) Fredrik Aursnes
CM	10	(Turkey) Orkun Kökçü		(substituted off) 88'
RF	14	(England) Reiss Nelson		(substituted off) 74'
CF	33	(Nigeria) Cyriel Dessers
LF	7	(Colombia) Luis Sinisterra
Substitutes:
GK	16	(Romania) Valentin Cojocaru
GK	21	(Israel) Ofir Marciano
GK	30	(Netherlands) Thijs Jansen
DF	2	(Norway) Marcus Holmgren Pedersen		(substituted on) 74'
DF	13	(Netherlands) Philippe Sandler
DF	25	(Netherlands) Ramon Hendriks
DF	32	(Netherlands) Denzel Hall
MF	6	(Netherlands) Jorrit Hendrix
MF	28	(Netherlands) Jens Toornstra		(substituted on) 59'
FW	9	(Iran) Alireza Jahanbakhsh		(substituted on) 88'
FW	11	(Netherlands) Bryan Linssen		(substituted on) 74'
FW	23	(Sweden) Patrik Wålemark		(substituted on) 88'
Manager:
(Netherlands) Arne Slot

Man of the Match:
Chris Smalling (Roma)

Assistant referees:
Vasile Marinescu (Romania)
Ovidiu Artene (Romania)
Fourth official:
Sandro Schärer (Switzerland)
Video assistant referee:
Marco Fritz (Germany)
Assistant video assistant referee:
Christian Dingert (Germany)
Support video assistant referee:
Bastian Dankert (Germany)

Match rules

- 90 minutes
- 30 minutes of extra time if necessary
- Penalty shoot-out if scores still level
- Twelve named substitutes
- Maximum of five substitutions, with a sixth allowed in extra time (Note: Each team was given only three opportunities to make substitutions, with a fourth opportunity in extra time, excluding substitutions made at half-time, before the start of extra time and at half-time in extra time.)

=== Statistics ===
First half
Statistic	Roma	Feyenoord
Goals scored	1	0
Total shots	2	5
Shots on target	1	2
Saves	2	0
Ball possession	41%	59%
Corner kicks	2	1
Fouls committed	3	8
Offsides	1	0
Yellow cards	1	1
Red cards	0	0

Second half
Statistic	Roma	Feyenoord
Goals scored	0	0
Total shots	6	7
Shots on target	2	3
Saves	3	2
Ball possession	31%	69%
Corner kicks	2	5
Fouls committed	5	10
Offsides	0	0
Yellow cards	3	0
Red cards	0	0

Overall
Statistic	Roma	Feyenoord
Goals scored	1	0
Total shots	8	12
Shots on target	3	5
Saves	5	2
Ball possession	36%	64%
Corner kicks	4	6
Fouls committed	8	18
Offsides	1	0
Yellow cards	4	1
Red cards	0	0

== See also ==
- 2022 UEFA Champions League final
- 2022 UEFA Europa League final
- 2022 UEFA Women's Champions League final
- 2022 UEFA Super Cup
- AS Roma in European football
- Feyenoord in international football
- 2021–22 AS Roma season
- 2021–22 Feyenoord season
