= Brievengat =

- Neighbourhood
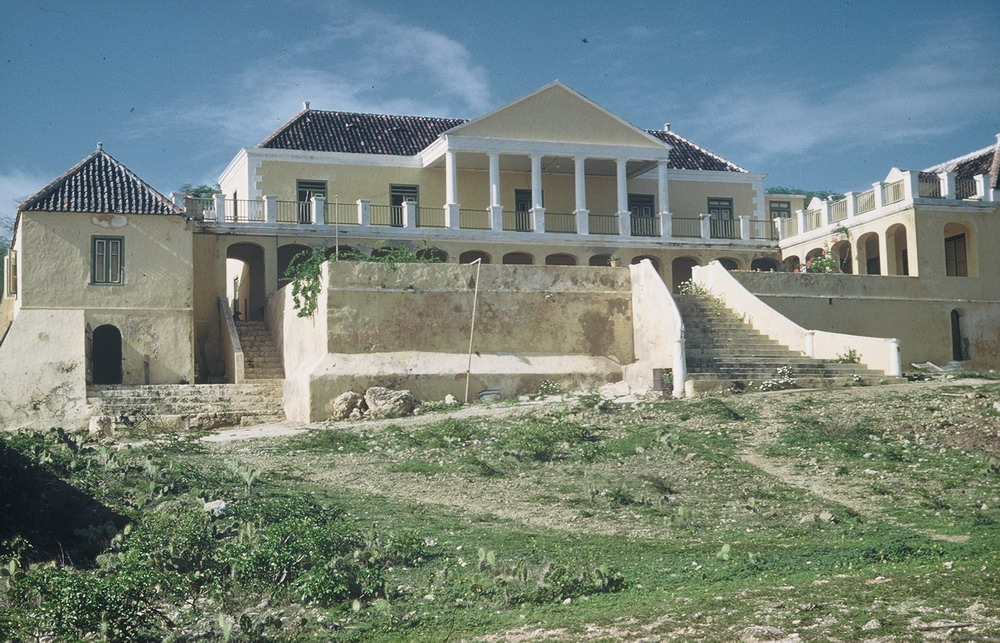
- Ronde Klip estate in Brievengat

- Location in Curaçao
- Coordinates: 12.14806°N 68.89437°W
- State: Kingdom of the Netherlands
- Country: Curaçao
- City: Willemstad

Area
  - Total: 4.93 km^{2} (1.90 sq mi)

Population (2011)
  - Total: 4,695
  - Density: 952/km^{2} (2,470/sq mi)

Brievengat (Dutch pronunciation: [ˈbrivə(ŋ)ˌɣɑt]) is a neighbourhood of Willemstad in Curaçao. It is located to the north of the centre of the capital, Willemstad, and to the east of the Hato International Airport.

== Overview ==
The origin of the name Brievengat (English: Letter hole) is unclear. It was first mentioned in 1708 in a will as the name of a plantation. The ground was very fertile, and the plantation flourished until 1877 when a hurricane destroyed the buildings, and killed about 75% of the animals. In 1924, the terrain was sold to Royal Dutch Shell who in turn sold it in 1954 to the monument trust who restored the buildings. In 1956, construction started of a residential neighbourhood with 1,400 houses on the former plantation grounds.

== Landhuis Brievengat ==
The estate was built in the 18th century. The kitchen dates from the 19th century. The estate has a rectangular shape with galleries on the front and rear of the building. On the side of the buildings are two towers. The buildings has been designed a monument. The estate is nowadays in use as an entertainment centre.

== Notable people ==
- Yurendell DeCaster (born 1979), Dutch professional baseball player.

== Bibliography ==
- Buurtprofiel Brievengat (2011). "Buurtprofiel Brievengat" (PDF). Government of Curaçao (in Dutch).
