= Pauke Meijers =

Dutch footballer

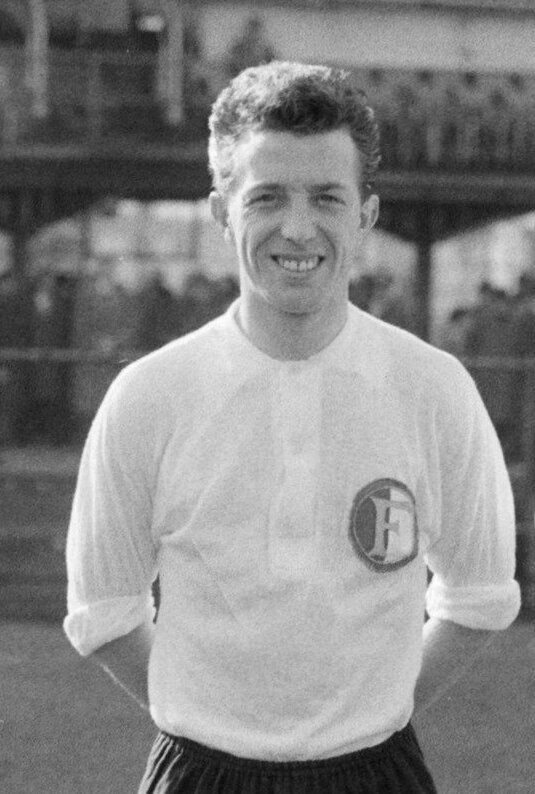

Personal information
- Full name: Paulus Maria Meijers
- Date of birth: 2 June 1934
- Place of birth: Nijmegen, Netherlands
- Date of death: 14 October 2013 (aged 79)
- Position: Winger

Youth career
- NEC

Senior career*
Years	Team	Apps	(Gls)
1952–1954	NEC	6	(0)
1954–1957	De Graafschap		(15)
1957–1961	Feyenoord	79	(22)
1961–1962	NAC	14	(3)
1962–1967	NEC	78	(10)
1967–1968	AGOVV		

International career^{‡}
1953	Netherlands	1	(0)
- * Club domestic league appearances and goals as of 15 October 2013 ‡ National team caps and goals as of 15 October 2013

Paul "Pauke" Meijers (2 June 1934 – 14 October 2013) was a Dutch football player.

== Club career ==
A right winger, Meijers followed in his father Hendrik's footsteps and started his career at NEC Nijmegen, making his professional debut against Rigtersbleek in September 1954 and joined Feyenoord from De Graafschap in 1957 for a then Dutch record 55,000 Dutch guilders and went on to play 98 official games for the Rotterdammers. He also had spells at De Graafschap, NAC Breda and AGOVV.

== International career ==
Meijers made his debut for the Netherlands in a September 1953 friendly match against Norway. It would end up as his only cap. He was the second player in NEC history to make the national team.

He also played for the Dutch army team.

== Personal life and death ==
Meijers was the father of former Helmond Sport manager Eric Meijers.

Meijers suffered from Alzheimer's disease and died on 14 October 2013.
