= 2023 UEFA Europa League final =

- Match programme cover
- Event: 2022–23 UEFA Europa League
Sevilla	Roma
(Spain)	(Italy)
1	1
- After extra time Sevilla won 4–1 on penalties
- Date: 31 May 2023
- Venue: Puskás Aréna, Budapest
- Man of the Match: Yassine Bounou (Sevilla)
- Referee: Anthony Taylor (England)
- Attendance: 61,476
- Weather: Clear night 18 °C (64 °F); 63% humidity

The 2023 UEFA Europa League final was the final match of the 2022–23 UEFA Europa League, the 52nd season of Europe's secondary club football tournament organised by UEFA, and the 14th season since it was renamed from the UEFA Cup to the UEFA Europa League. The match was played at the Puskás Aréna in Budapest, Hungary, on 31 May 2023, between Spanish club Sevilla and Italian club Roma. Due to the postponement and relocation of the 2020 final, the final hosts were shifted back a year, with Budapest instead hosting the 2023 final.

Sevilla won the match 4–1 on penalties following a 1–1 draw after extra time for their record seventh UEFA Cup/Europa League title. As winners, they qualified for the group stage of the 2023–24 UEFA Champions League, and earned the right to play against the winners of the 2022–23 UEFA Champions League, Manchester City, in the 2023 UEFA Super Cup.

== Background ==
Sevilla were aiming for their record-extending seventh UEFA Cup/Europa League title, having won their previous finals in 2006, 2007, 2014, 2015, 2016, and 2020. Their manager José Luis Mendilibar was seeking the first major title in his managerial career.

Roma were into their fourth European final and seeking their first UEFA Cup/Europa League title, having lost the 1984 European Cup final and the 1991 UEFA Cup final as well as winning the 2021–22 UEFA Europa Conference League. Manager José Mourinho was also looking to win his second consecutive European title with Roma. He could become the first manager since Rafael Benítez in 2005 to win two different major European trophies in consecutive seasons, and the first of the five managers (Note: They are Nereo Rocco (1967–68 European Cup Winners' Cup and 1968–69 European Cup, both with Milan), Bob Paisley (1975–76 UEFA Cup and 1976–77 European Cup, both with Liverpool), Giovanni Trapattoni (1983–84 European Cup Winners' Cup and 1984–85 European Cup, both with Juventus), Mourinho, and Benítez (2003–04 UEFA Cup with Valencia and 2004–05 UEFA Champions League with Liverpool).) to achieve that twice, having done so with Porto in 2004. He also had the chance to become the first manager to win six major European competition titles (Note: European Cup/Champions League, Cup Winners' Cup, UEFA Cup/Europa League, UEFA Europa Conference League.) and also the first to have won the UEFA Cup/Europa League with three distinct clubs, having won the 2002–03 UEFA Cup with Porto and the 2016–17 UEFA Europa League with Manchester United.

Both clubs had met in the 2019–20 UEFA Europa League knockout phase round of 16, which was only played as a single tie because of the COVID-19 pandemic in Europe. Sevilla won the game 2–0.

=== Previous finals ===
In the following table, the finals until 2009 were in the UEFA Cup era, and since 2010 in the UEFA Europa League era.

Team	Previous final appearances (bold indicates winners)
(Spain) Sevilla	6 (**2006**, **2007**, **2014**, **2015**, **2016**, **2020**)
(Italy) Roma	1 (1991)

== Venue ==
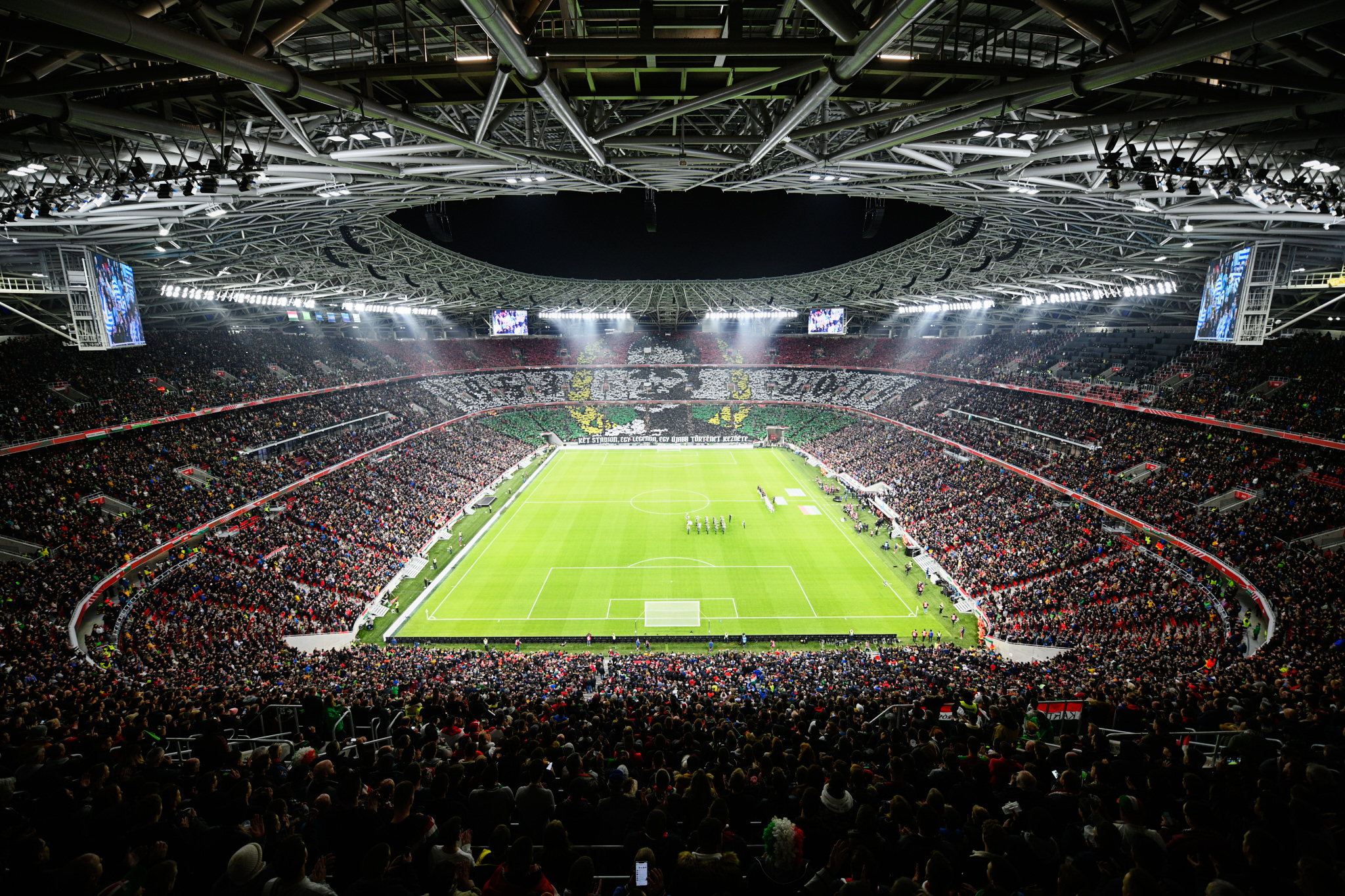
The Puskás Aréna in Budapest hosted the final.

The match was the first UEFA Cup/Europa League final to be held in Budapest, and the second final in the competition's history to be held in Hungary after the 1985 first leg. The final was also the third UEFA club competition final to be held in the city after the 2019 UEFA Women's Champions League final and the 2020 UEFA Super Cup, making it the fourth overall UEFA club final in Hungary. The stadium was also chosen as a venue for UEFA Euro 2020, where it hosted three group stage matches and a round of 16 fixture.

=== Host selection ===
The Puskás Aréna was selected as the final host by the UEFA Executive Committee during their meeting in Amsterdam, the Netherlands, on 2 March 2020.

On 17 June 2020, the UEFA Executive Committee announced that due to the postponement and relocation of the 2020 final, Budapest would instead host the 2023 final.

== Route to the final ==
Note: In all results below, the score of the finalist is given first (H: home; A: away).

(Spain) Sevilla				Round	(Italy) Roma			
Champions League					Europa League			
Opponent	Result			Group stage (CL, EL)	Opponent	Result		
(England) Manchester City	0–4 (H)			Matchday 1	(Bulgaria) Ludogorets Razgrad	1–2 (A)		
(Denmark) Copenhagen	0–0 (A)			Matchday 2	(Finland) HJK	3–0 (H)		
(Germany) Borussia Dortmund	1–4 (H)			Matchday 3	(Spain) Real Betis	1–2 (H)		
(Germany) Borussia Dortmund	1–1 (A)			Matchday 4	(Spain) Real Betis	1–1 (A)		
(Denmark) Copenhagen	3–0 (H)			Matchday 5	(Finland) HJK	2–1 (A)		
(England) Manchester City	1–3 (A)			Matchday 6	(Bulgaria) Ludogorets Razgrad	3–1 (H)		
Group G third place: Pos / Team / Pld / Pts; 1 / (England) Manchester City / 6 / 14; 2 / (Germany) Borussia Dortmund / 6 / 9; 3 / (Spain) Sevilla / 6 / 5; 4 / (Denmark) Copenhagen / 6 / 3; Source: UEFA				Final standings	Group C runners-up: Pos / Team / Pld / Pts; 1 / (Spain) Real Betis / 6 / 16; 2 / (Italy) Roma / 6 / 10; 3 / (Bulgaria) Ludogorets Razgrad / 6 / 7; 4 / (Finland) HJK / 6 / 1; Source: UEFA			
Europa League					Group C runners-up: Pos / Team / Pld / Pts; 1 / (Spain) Real Betis / 6 / 16; 2 / (Italy) Roma / 6 / 10; 3 / (Bulgaria) Ludogorets Razgrad / 6 / 7; 4 / (Finland) HJK / 6 / 1; Source: UEFA			
Opponent	Agg.	1st leg	2nd leg	Knockout phase	Opponent	Agg.	1st leg	2nd leg
(Netherlands) PSV Eindhoven	3–2	3–0 (H)	0–2 (A)	Knockout round play-offs	(Austria) Red Bull Salzburg	2–1	0–1 (A)	2–0 (H)
(Turkey) Fenerbahçe	2–1	2–0 (H)	0–1 (A)	Round of 16	(Spain) Real Sociedad	2–0	2–0 (H)	0–0 (A)
(England) Manchester United	5–2	2–2 (A)	3–0 (H)	Quarter-finals	(Netherlands) Feyenoord	4–2	0–1 (A)	4–1 (a.e.t.) (H)
(Italy) Juventus	3–2	1–1 (A)	2–1 (a.e.t.) (H)	Semi-finals	(Germany) Bayer Leverkusen	1–0	1–0 (H)	0–0 (A)

== Pre-match ==
=== Identity ===
The original identity of the 2023 UEFA Europa League Final was unveiled at the group stage draw on 26 August 2022.

=== Ambassador ===
The ambassador for the final was former Hungarian international Zoltán Gera, who finished as runner-up in the 2009–10 UEFA Europa League with Fulham.

=== Ticketing ===
With a stadium capacity of 63,000 for the final, a total amount of 46,800 tickets were available to fans and the general public, with the two finalist teams receiving 15,000 tickets each, and with the other tickets being available for sale to fans worldwide via UEFA.com from 21 to 28 April 2023 in four price categories: €150, €100, €65, and €40. Accessibility tickets for disabled spectators cost €40. The remaining tickets were allocated to the local organising committee, national associations, commercial partners, and broadcasters, and to serve the corporate hospitality programme.

== Match ==
=== Summary ===
In the 35th minute, Roma went in front when Paulo Dybala slotted the ball low into the right corner of the net after a pass from Gianluca Mancini, but Sevilla equalised ten minutes into the second half when Mancini turned the ball into his own goal after a cross from Jesús Navas on the right to make it 1–1. The game went to a penalties following almost 132 minutes of game time. After two missed Roma penalties in the shootout, one of which was saved by goalkeeper Yassine Bounou and the other of which hit the post, Gonzalo Montiel, who also scored the winning penalty for Argentina in the 2022 FIFA World Cup final against France, scored the winner for Sevilla. His penalty at first was missed but was re-taken owing to encroachment.

=== Details ===
The "home" team (for administrative purposes) was determined by an additional draw held after the quarter-final and semi-final draws.

31 May 2023
21:00 UTC+2

Sevilla (Spain)	1–1 (a.e.t.)	(Italy) Roma
Mancini 55' (o.g.)	Report	Dybala 35'
Penalties
Ocampos (penalty scored); Lamela (penalty scored); Rakitić (penalty scored); Montiel (penalty scored)	4–1	(penalty scored) Cristante; (penalty missed) Mancini; (penalty missed) Ibañez

Puskás Aréna, Budapest
Attendance: 61,476
Referee: Anthony Taylor (England)

Sevilla	Roma

GK	13	(Morocco) Yassine Bounou
RB	16	(Spain) Jesús Navas (c)		(substituted off) 94'
CB	44	(France) Loïc Badé
CB	6	(Serbia) Nemanja Gudelj		(substituted off) 120+8'
LB	3	(Brazil) Alex Telles		(substituted off) 95'
CM	20	(Brazil) Fernando		(substituted off) 120+8'
CM	10	(Croatia) Ivan Rakitić	(yellow card) 65'
RW	55	(Argentina) Lucas Ocampos	(yellow card) 120+10'
AM	21	(Spain) Óliver Torres		(substituted off) 46'
LW	25	(Spain) Bryan Gil		(substituted off) 46'
CF	15	(Morocco) Youssef En-Nesyri
Substitutes:
GK	1	(Serbia) Marko Dmitrović
GK	31	(Spain) Alberto Flores
DF	2	(Argentina) Gonzalo Montiel	(yellow card) 120+4'	(substituted on) 94'
DF	4	(Netherlands) Karim Rekik		(substituted on) 95'
DF	14	(France) Tanguy Nianzou
DF	23	(Brazil) Marcão		(substituted on) 120+8'
MF	8	(Spain) Joan Jordán	(yellow card) 120'	(substituted on) 120+8'
MF	24	(Argentina) Alejandro Gómez
MF	43	(Spain) Manu Bueno
FW	7	(Spain) Suso		(substituted on) 46'
FW	12	(Spain) Rafa Mir	(yellow card) 36'
FW	17	(Argentina) Erik Lamela	(yellow card) 109'	(substituted on) 46'
Manager:
(Spain) José Luis Mendilibar

GK	1	(Portugal) Rui Patrício
CB	23	(Italy) Gianluca Mancini	(yellow card) 48'
CB	6	(England) Chris Smalling
CB	3	(Brazil) Roger Ibañez
RM	19	(Turkey) Zeki Çelik	(yellow card) 74'	(substituted off) 91'
CM	4	(Italy) Bryan Cristante	(yellow card) 65'
CM	8	(Serbia) Nemanja Matić	(yellow card) 21'	(substituted off) 120'
LM	37	(Italy) Leonardo Spinazzola		(substituted off) 106'
AM	7	(Italy) Lorenzo Pellegrini (c)	(yellow card) 45'	(substituted off) 106'
CF	21	(Argentina) Paulo Dybala		(substituted off) 68'
CF	9	(England) Tammy Abraham		(substituted off) 74'
Substitutes:
GK	63	(Italy) Pietro Boer
GK	99	(Serbia) Mile Svilar
DF	2	(Netherlands) Rick Karsdorp	(yellow card) 120+10'
DF	14	(Spain) Diego Llorente		(substituted on) 106'
MF	20	(Guinea) Mady Camara
MF	25	(Netherlands) Georginio Wijnaldum		(substituted on) 68'
MF	52	(Italy) Edoardo Bove		(substituted on) 120'
MF	59	(Poland) Nicola Zalewski	(yellow card) 105'	(substituted on) 91'
MF	62	(Italy) Cristian Volpato
MF	68	(Bosnia and Herzegovina) Benjamin Tahirović
FW	11	(Italy) Andrea Belotti		(substituted on) 74'
FW	92	(Italy) Stephan El Shaarawy		(substituted on) 106'
Other disciplinary actions:
TS	(Italy) Salvatore Foti		(yellow card) 82'
Manager:
(Portugal) José Mourinho			(yellow card) 120'

Man of the Match:
Yassine Bounou (Sevilla)

Assistant referees:
Gary Beswick (England)
Adam Nunn (England)
Fourth official:
Michael Oliver (England)
Reserve assistant referee:
Stuart Burt (England)
Video assistant referee:
Stuart Attwell (England)
Assistant video assistant referee:
Chris Kavanagh (England)
Support video assistant referee:
Bastian Dankert (Germany)

Match rules

- 90 minutes
- 30 minutes of extra time if necessary
- Penalty shoot-out if scores still level
- Twelve named substitutes
- Maximum of five substitutions, with a sixth allowed in extra time (Note: Each team was given only three opportunities to make substitutions, with a fourth opportunity in extra time, excluding substitutions made at half-time, before the start of extra time and at half-time in extra time.)

=== Statistics ===
First half
Statistic	Sevilla	Roma
Goals scored	0	1
Total shots	4	2
Shots on target	1	2
Saves	1	1
Ball possession	58%	42%
Corner kicks	2	1
Fouls committed	7	8
Offsides	0	0
Yellow cards	1	2
Red cards	0	0

Second half
Statistic	Sevilla	Roma
Goals scored	1	0
Total shots	11	6
Shots on target	1	1
Saves	1	1
Ball possession	65%	35%
Corner kicks	2	0
Fouls committed	8	8
Offsides	1	0
Yellow cards	1	3
Red cards	0	0

Extra time
Statistic	Sevilla	Roma
Goals scored	0	0
Total shots	3	3
Shots on target	1	0
Saves	0	1
Ball possession	65%	35%
Corner kicks	2	3
Fouls committed	6	3
Offsides	0	1
Yellow cards	4	3
Red cards	0	0

Overall
Statistic	Sevilla	Roma
Goals scored	1	1
Total shots	18	11
Shots on target	3	3
Saves	2	3
Ball possession	62%	38%
Corner kicks	6	4
Fouls committed	21	19
Offsides	1	1
Yellow cards	6	8
Red cards	0	0

== Post-match ==
=== Critical response ===
Steve McManaman told BT Sport that the final had been "really ugly" and "unsavoury". He also stated his belief that the "behaviour and histrionics of both benches" had been "awful", saying that he felt for "the fourth official, Michael Oliver".

== See also ==
- 2023 UEFA Champions League final
- 2023 UEFA Europa Conference League final
- 2023 UEFA Women's Champions League final
- 2023 UEFA Super Cup
- AS Roma in European football
- Sevilla FC in European football
- 2022–23 AS Roma season
- 2022–23 Sevilla FC season
