= Benelux Cup =

- Founded: 1957
- Abolished: 1961
- Region: Europe (UEFA)
- Last champions: (Netherlands) Feyenoord (2)

Benelux Cup or Benelux Friendship Cup, is a defunct friendly football club tournament.

== Winners ==
Years	Winners	Runner-up	Score
1957–58	(Netherlands) Feyenoord	(Belgium) Anderlecht	6–0
1958–59	(Netherlands) Feyenoord	(France) UA Sedan	4–2
1959–61	(Italy) Lanerossi Vicenza	(Netherlands) PSV Eindhoven	2–1
