= Feyenoord Tournament =

Football friendlies in Rotterdam

The Feyenoord Tournament was a friendly pre season football tournament that took place between 1978 and 1991.The tournament was held by the famous Dutch giants Feyenoord and 3 other invited teams. All the games were played at the Feijenoord Stadion, Rotterdam which is the home stadium of Feyenoord.

== Winners ==
Year	Winner
1978	Feyenoord
1979	Feyenoord
1980	Southampton FC
1981	Celtic FC
1982	Feyenoord
1983	Hamburger SV
1984	Feyenoord
1985	Grêmio
1986	Werder Bremen
1987	Standard Liège
1988	Feyenoord
1989	Feyenoord
1990	Feyenoord
1991	Dinamo Bucharest

== Details ==
=== 1981 Tournament ===
==== Semi Final (31/07/1981) ====
- (Czechoslovakia) Dukla Prague 3 - 1 (Belgium) RSC Anderlecht
- (Scotland) Celtic FC 2 - 1 (Netherlands) Feyenoord

==== Third Place Match (02/08/1981) ====
- (Belgium) RSC Anderlecht 1 - 1 (Netherlands) Feyenoord (5-4 pen)

==== Final (02/08/1981) ====
- (Scotland) Celtic FC 2 - 1 (Czechoslovakia) Dukla Prague

=== 1982 Tournament ===
==== Semi Final (06/08/1982) ====
- (Scotland) Celtic FC^{1} 4 - 0 FK Austria Wien
- (Netherlands) Feyenoord 2 - 0 (England) Arsenal FC

==== Third Place Match (08/08/1982) ====
- FK Austria Wien 4 - 0 (England) Arsenal FC

==== Final (08/08/1982) ====
- (Netherlands) Feyenoord 4 - 3 (Scotland) Celtic FC

^{1} Celtic FC were invited to the tournament again as they were the holders of the trophy.
