= Arena Kombëtare =

Football stadium in Tirana, Albania

- Air Albania Stadium

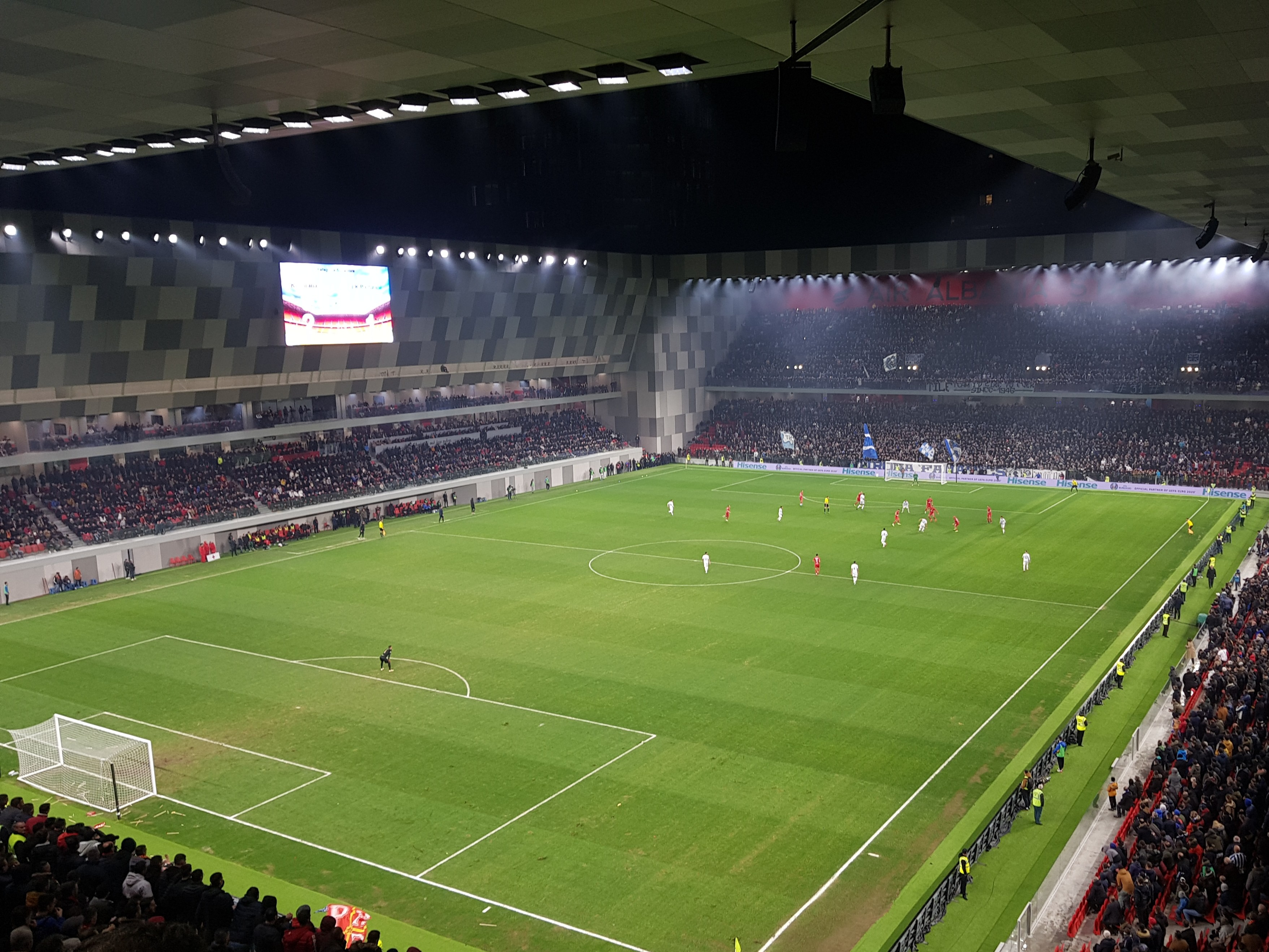
- UEFA
- Interactive map of Arena Kombëtare
- Address: Sheshi Italia 1, 1010
- Location: Tirana, Albania
- Coordinates: 41°19′6″N 19°49′27″E
- Elevation: 112 m (367 ft)
- Owner: Albanian Football Federation
- Operator: Qendra Sportive Kuq e Zi Sh.A.
- Capacity: 22,500
- Surface: Grass
- Scoreboard: LED
- Field size: 110 x 68 m

Construction
- Groundbreaking: June 2016
- Built: 2016–2019
- Opened: 17 November 2019
- Cost: €85 million
- Architect: Marco Casamonti (Archea Associati)
- Builder: AlbStar Sh.P.K.
- Structural engineer: AEI Progetti srl

Tenants
- Albania national football team (2019–present); Major sporting events hosted; 2022 UEFA Europa Conference League final 2027 UEFA European Under-21 Championship

Website
- arenacenter.al

Arena Kombëtare (pronounced [aˈɾena ˌkɔmbəˈtaɾɛ]; known as the Air Albania Stadium for sponsorship reasons) is an all-seater, multi-purpose football stadium located in the Albanian capital city of Tirana which was built on the ground of the former Qemal Stafa Stadium. The stadium has a seating capacity of 22,500 constituting the largest stadium in Albania.

The stadium is owned by the governing body of Albanian football, the Albanian Football Association (FSHF) and the Albanian State through Shoqëria Sportive Kuq e Zi Sh.A, a subsidiary established for the purpose of building, managing and maintaining the structure.

Designed by Marco Casamonti of Archea Associati, the structure of the stadium is a peculiar multi-faceted form (an 8-faceted rectangle) so that each side allows access to distinct functions. At one corner of the stadium structure is an 112-metre tall tower (24 floors). Each facet accommodates different streams, thus identifying users of private areas, such as the hotel tower, shopping areas and stadium spectators.

In May 2022, the stadium hosted the first ever Europa Conference League final between AS Roma and Feyenoord Rotterdam. It will host the 2027 UEFA European Under-21 Championship final.

== Location ==
The stadium is located in the city-centre of the capital city of Tirana. Precisely on the Italia Square which itself is alongside one of the two main squares of the city, the Mother Teresa Square, named after the Albanian-born Saint Teresa of Calcutta. Both squares are located at the southern end of the Dëshmorët e Kombit Boulevard, which on that side is confined to the University of Tirana building and the Grand Park of the city. The whole area, including the old Qemal Stafa Stadium, was conceived and built during the Kingdom of Albania and later during the Italian occupation by architects and urban planners Gherardo Bosio, Armando Brasini and Florestano Di Fausto. The stadium is surrounded by other public buildings such as the University of Tirana, the Palace of Congress, the Archaeological Museum, University of Arts, the Presidential palace, etc.

== History ==
=== Planning and attempts ===
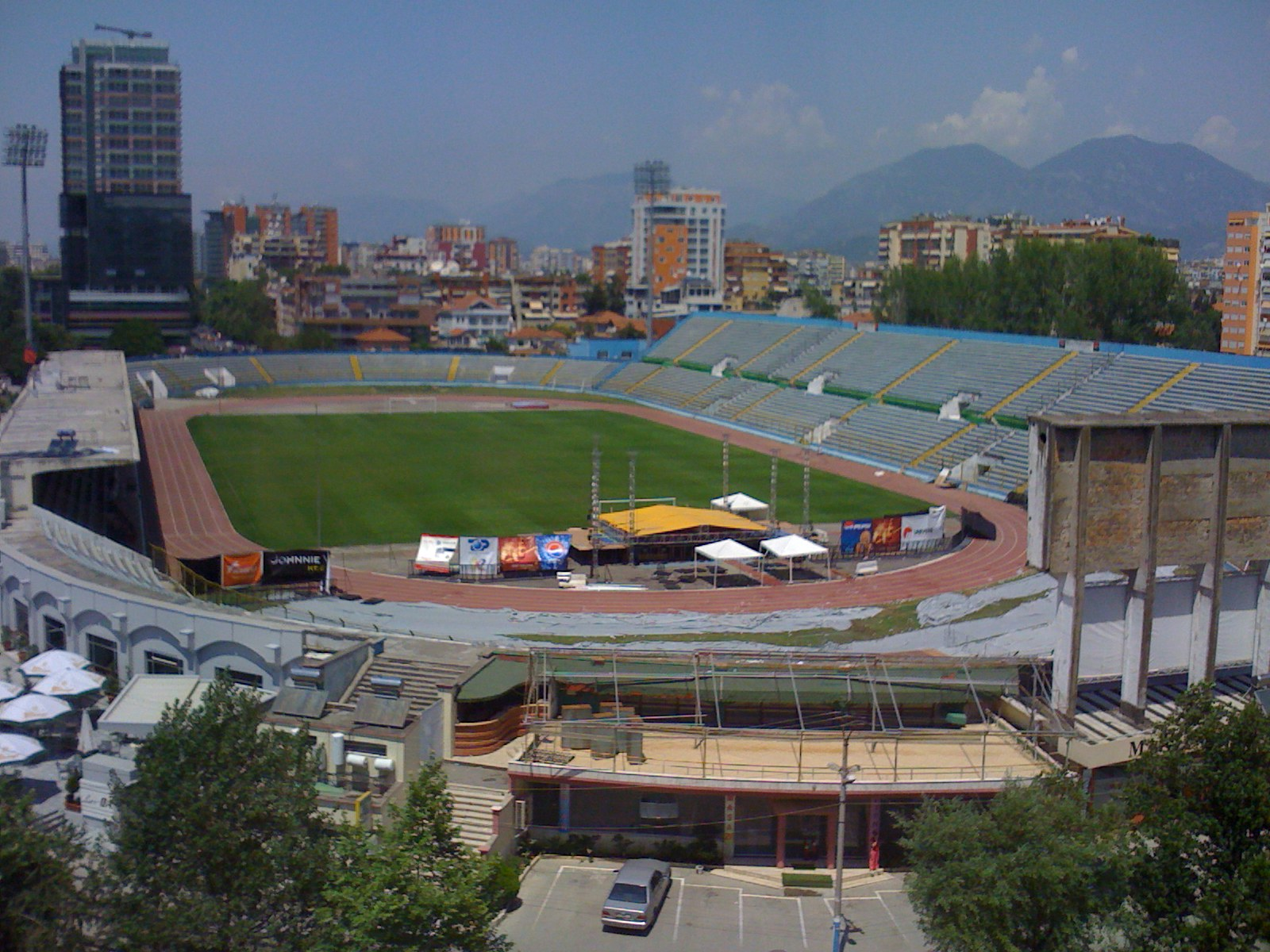
The Qemal Stafa Stadium

For more than 60 years since its construction, Qemal Stafa Stadium served as the main stadium in Albania, the home of the Albania national team, as well as the home of several athletic competitions and other events. After its degradation over the years, around 2010s the Albanian Football Association (FSHF) and the Albanian government began to discuss the possibility of renovating the facility or, if not possible, building a new stadium in the same location. The government and the FSHF came to an agreement to create a joint venture that would handle the tendering, construction and then management of the new stadium, with the condition that the destination of the sports facility would not be changed. Thus, on 26 March 2011, was established Qëndra Sportive Kuq e Zi Sh.A with 70% of shareholding belonging to the FSHF and 25% to the Albanian Government through the Ministry of Sports.

On 19 October 2010, Albania's PM Sali Berisha after a meeting with the President of UEFA Michel Platini, declared that the government is seriously considering the construction of a new stadium. Soon after, at a meeting of the Council of Ministers on 2 February 2011, a decision was taken that for the 100th Anniversary of the Independence of Albania, which will occur in 2012, a new national stadium will be built in Tirana. Fenwick Iribarren Architects was commissioned to design the new stadium. The project envisioned the construction of a 33,000 all-seated stadium with an exterior facade representing Albanian state borders and its flag colours. But it never went ahead with the implementation of the project, considering it too expensive for the state budget which would cover most of the construction costs.

In November 2013 the President of the FSHF, Armand Duka stated that UEFA will no longer allow European competitions such as the Champions League, UEFA Europa League and other international leagues to be played at Qemal Stafa Stadium or any other stadium in Albania because none of them met UEFA standards. Consequently, the Albania national team and the Albanian Superliga teams participating in international competitions risked playing their matches abroad. Soon after, FSHF in cooperation with the new government elected, took steps to finance the reconstruction of the Elbasan Arena stadium to avoid UEFA's penalties, thus giving time for the construction of a new national stadium in Tirana.

Efforts were made again in 2015, but this time trying new forms of financing without burdening the state budget. The Italian company Serenissima Costruzioni in collaboration with MANICA Architecture and Progetto CMR as designer, presented its project for the stadium. The project envisioned the transfer of ownership of all non-sporting and commercial spaces in favour of the company, as well as the construction of a tower on one side of the stadium which would also be owned by the company. This attempt also failed during negotiations between the government and the investor because the company requested the government to provide bank guarantees for the loans that the company would obtain during construction.

On 22 May 2016 after the stadium was previously excluded from UEFA due to non-compliance with the standards, the last match between FK Kukësi and KF Laçi valid for the Albanian Cup Final was played in the Qemal Stafa Stadium before its final closure until the new stadium begins to build.

=== Final effort and tendering ===
A final attempt was made the following month by reopening the invitation to tender, with AlbStar Sh.p.k presenting a concrete offer. Compared to previous projects, AlbStar presented a new project with a reduced capacity of 22.500 all-seated stadium which also envisioned a tower in one corner of the stadium structure. The project was designed by Florentine architect Marco Casamonti of Archea Associati, who envisioned a faceted rectangular stadium bound by a curved line. Such a form of the stadium was associated with the symbolism of the map of Albania which has a similar rectangular shape from north to south with some curved incisions at the northeast, northwest, southeast and southwestern extremes of the country. The external facade is covered with black and red metal panels combining them with the use of glass on the whole facade, including the tower. The metal panels have a curved triangular form, stylised with some shapes reminiscent of traditional Albanian carpets. The tower itself is 112 metres high and it fits the curved line of the structure on that side. The sports spaces inside the stadium consists of 3 uniform two-ring grandstands, and the main grandstand of one level which serves only for VIP stands.

=== Demolition and construction ===
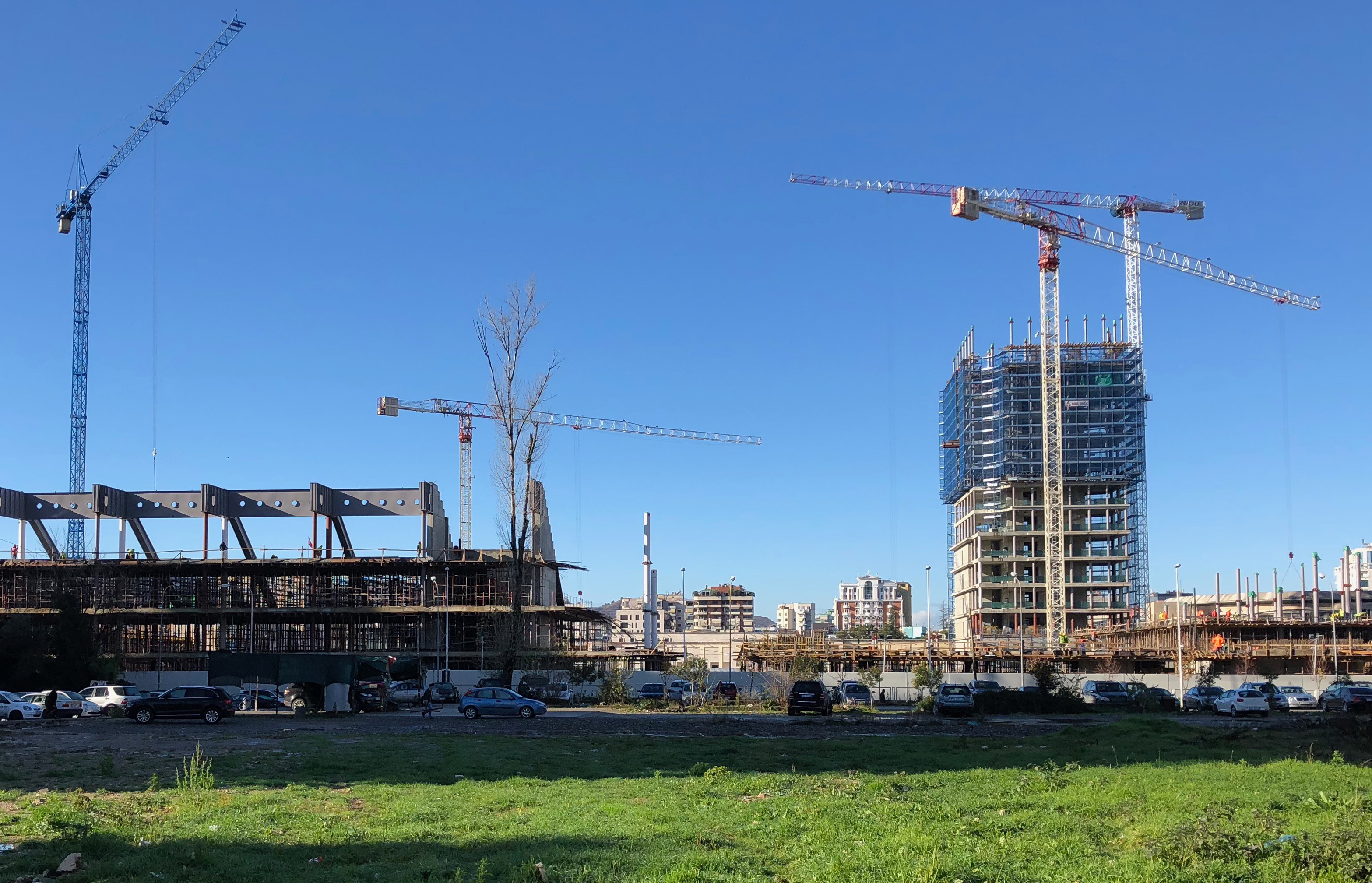
Arena Kombëtare during construction

On 21 April 2016, the project was officially presented by the President of FSHF Armand Duka, accompanied by the PM Edi Rama. At the design stage and during its presentation, the project was named "Arena Kombëtare" (English: National Arena), becoming the common name and widely used throughout its construction. The preliminary cost of the construction was initially said to be around € 50 million but later was increased to 60m, and according to comments from FSHF officials, the final cost exceeded 75 million euros.

The signed contract stipulates that most of the cost of construction will be carried out by the private company itself, somewhere around € 40 million, and the difference of € 10 million would be covered by UEFA’s HatTrick assistance programme. Also, any cost increases during construction would also be carried by the company. While the company would be rewarded with the ownership of all non-sporting parts and the tower which will be built simultaneously on one corner of the structure, as well as exempting the company from VAT payments for any work done related to the project.

On the other hand, any other cost for everything sports spaces or game-related spaces will be carried out by the federation itself in cooperation with the government. The FSHF will pay for the interior design of the sports spaces, such as the changing rooms, conference rooms, etc. Also for the natural grass for the pitch, all the seats, the LED floodlights, as well as a large screen also in LED to be installed on the roof of the main grandstand.

On 9 June 2016, the demolition of the National Stadium Qemal Stafa officially began. A new stadium, the Arena Kombëtare, will be built in its place, which will serve as the new home of the Albania national football team. The stadium will have 21,690 seats, but the facility is projected to be multi-functional. Simultaneously with the demolition began the disassembling stone by stone of the monumental staircase built by Gherardo Bosio in 1939, which is considered Monument of Culture and part of the cultural heritage of the capital. It will be conserved and then integrated by reassembled in the same location into the new stadium, where it will serve the same function as the main entrance to the stadium as it has had since its construction.

Initially it was said that at least the sports areas of the stadium would be completed within two years of the start of construction, otherwise there would be penalties for the company. But since the beginning of the works there were problems with the sewage system of the capital which passed just under the old stadium, which caused the work to be delayed until the solution was found in cooperation with the Municipality. Then there were some other postponements making the stadium finally wrap up on 10 November 2019, waiting for the first time a test match between women's football teams of Vllaznia Shkodër and Apolonia Fier.

=== Opening ===
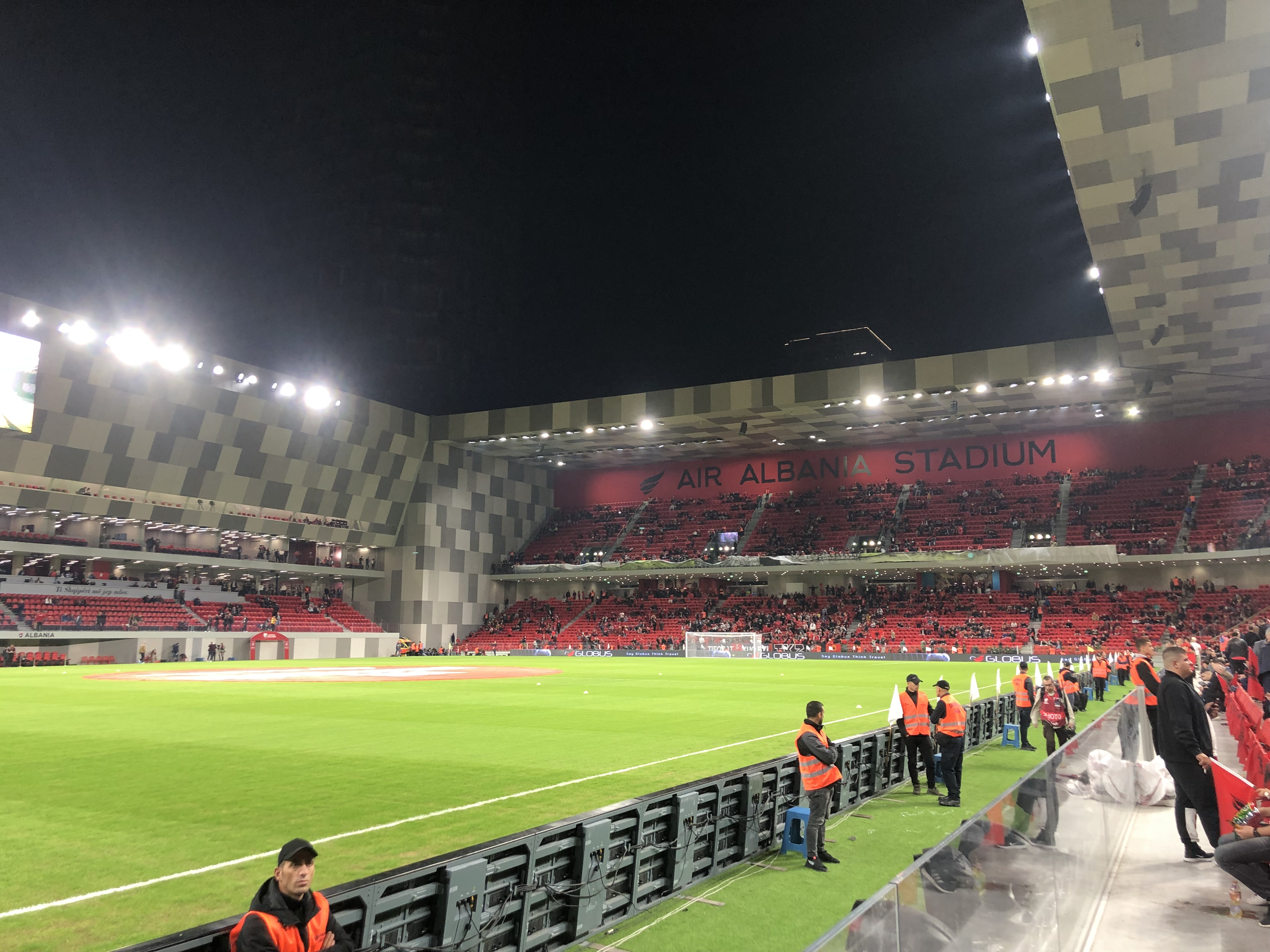
Air Albania Stadium during its inauguration match between Albania and France

The FSHF initially announced that the stadium would most likely be inaugurated on 11 June 2019 but had to be tested and inspected by UEFA officials beforehand. However, the plan for the inauguration was postponed due to the delay in work and the pitch just being installed. The first test match was originally set to be played on 3 November, but was delayed by a week due to heavy rains. The first match, a women's fixture between KF Vllaznia and KF Apollonia held on 10 November, was attended by many fans and won by Vllaznia 2–0, with the first-ever goal at the stadium scored by Arbiona Bajraktari.

Arena Kombëtare, now under the new official name of Air Albania Stadium, was officially inaugurated with a ceremony on 17 November 2019, 1274 days after the final game at the old stadium. The first match, was valid for the Euro 2020 qualifiers played at 20:45 between the national teams of Albania and France, which the host team lost 0–2. A crowd of more 21,000 was in attendance. Many celebrities of sport, politics and art were invited to the ceremony, with the UEFA President Aleksander Čeferin and Prime Minister of Albania Edi Rama were among them.

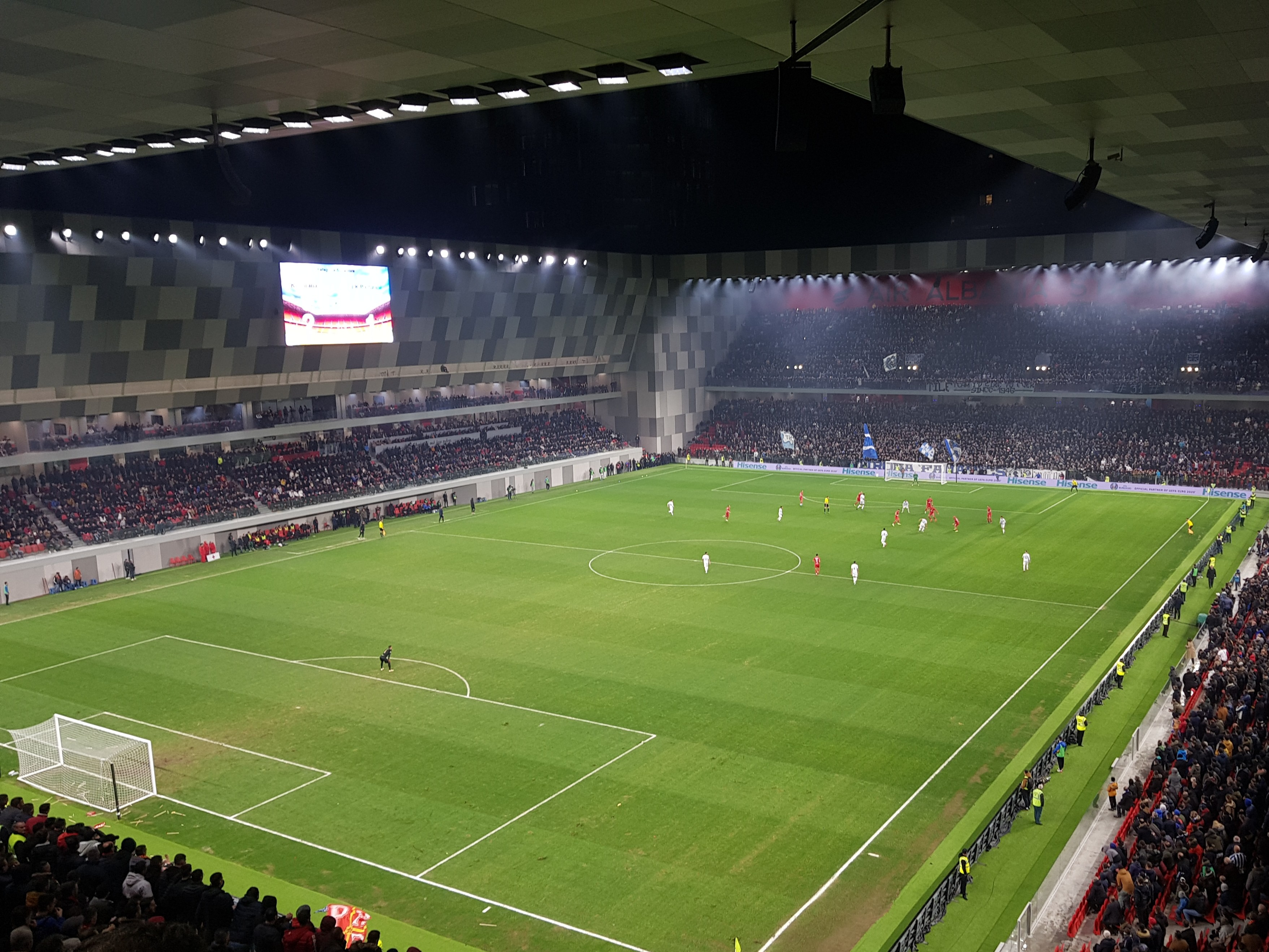
Tirana-Partizani match on 28 February 2020

=== Naming ===
Since 1946, the time at which the stadium was finished, was named Qemal Stafa Stadium in honor of Qemal Stafa, a hero of the second world war and founder of the Communist Party, which was in power after the war. The old stadium held this name until 9 June 2016, the day on which its demolition officially began.

During a ceremony held to present the winning project and the conclusion of the agreement for the construction of the new stadium, Albania's PM Edi Rama referred to the new stadium with the name of Arena Kombëtare. This made the stadium widely known and referred to as "Arena Kombëtare" from the day the works began until a few weeks before the completion of the work. However, much controversy arose during the construction of whether the stadium should retain its old name "Qemal Stafa", the new one "Arena Kombëtare" or should be renamed in honor of a prominent Albanian football player to honor him as well as the history of this sport in the country. The most discussed figure was that of Panajot Pano, the former striker of KF Partizani, one of the capital's teams, as well as the national football team player. His name is widely respected and is considered one of the greatest footballers the country has ever known.

Towards the end of the works, however, the FSHF hinted that the stadium could be named after a private company for sponsorship reasons. According to the federation, such a stadium will require ongoing funding due to maintenance and this necessitates taking advantage of any sponsorship opportunities.

This led to the opening of the tender on 8 August 2019, just months before the inauguration, for the new stadium name. Some domestic and foreign companies were interested in the competition, including oil, telecommunications, insurance, and airline companies. On 15 November 2019, Kuq e Zi Sh.A issued a press release announcing that two companies, Bolv Oil and Air Albania, went in the final phase of negotiations. With the Air Albania being announced as the winner with the most favourable bid.

The deal stipulates that within the next five years starting from the date of signing, the new stadium name will be "Air Albania Stadium". It was also decided that each tribune would have its own name.

- Main Stand to be named - Qemal Stafa Stand, in honor of the hero as well as the demolished stadium which was in the same location.
- East Stand to be named - Panajot Pano Stand, in honor of former KF Partizani player.
- North Stand to be named - Fatmir Frashëri Stand, in honor of former KF Tirana player.
- South Stand to be named - Vasillaq Zëri Stand, in honor of former FK Dinamo player.

== Structure and facilities ==
=== Tirana Marriott Hotel and Arena Centre ===
The stadium is located near the centre of the capital Tirana. The building built on the side of the stadium includes a Tirana Marriott Hotel. The stadium includes a history museum, changing rooms, and other facilities such as cafeterias, lavatories including access for the disabled, a press area, a convention centre, a trophy room, etc.

There is no room for a running track as capacity will grow to over 22,000 seats, all covered. The overall project is part of the Arena Shopping Centre together with the 112-metre tower, 80-room hotel and 256 underground parking spaces. All of the stadium facilities will be hidden behind a unique set of blinders in national colours of Albania.

=== Tirana's TUMO Center ===
In October 2020, the Municipality of Tirana alongside the Albanian-American Development Fund (AADF) decided to temporarily open the TUMO Center on the Arena Kombëtare internal spaces. The center offers for adolescents aged 12–18, extracurricular educational programs, innovative in design and technology, providing adolescents with space and equipment to advance their education while developing technical skills. The original location of the TUMO Tirana is the Pyramid of Tirana which is planned to be reconstructed and returned to the headquarters of this teaching center.

== Image gallery ==
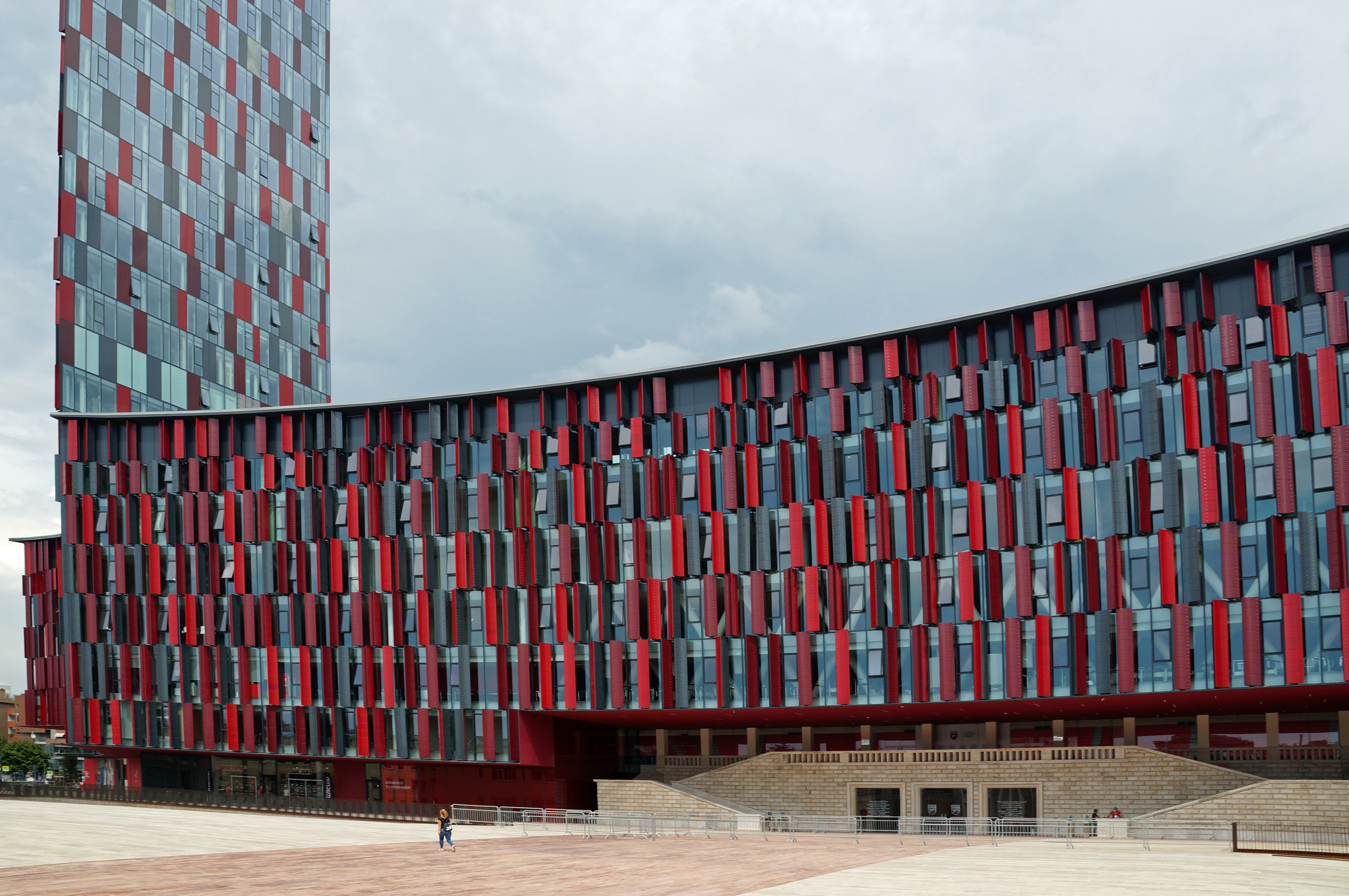
The tower and main entrance, incorporating part of the old stadium in rationalist style

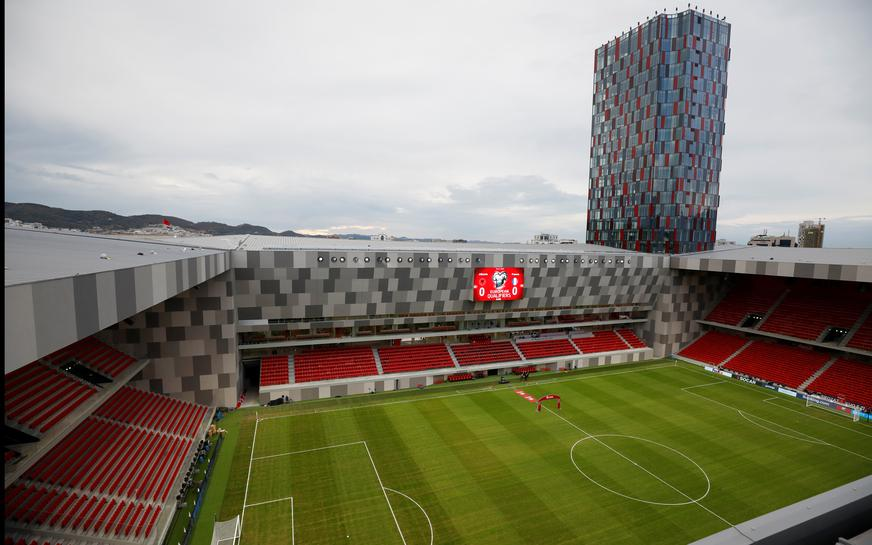
The stadium from above the grandstand

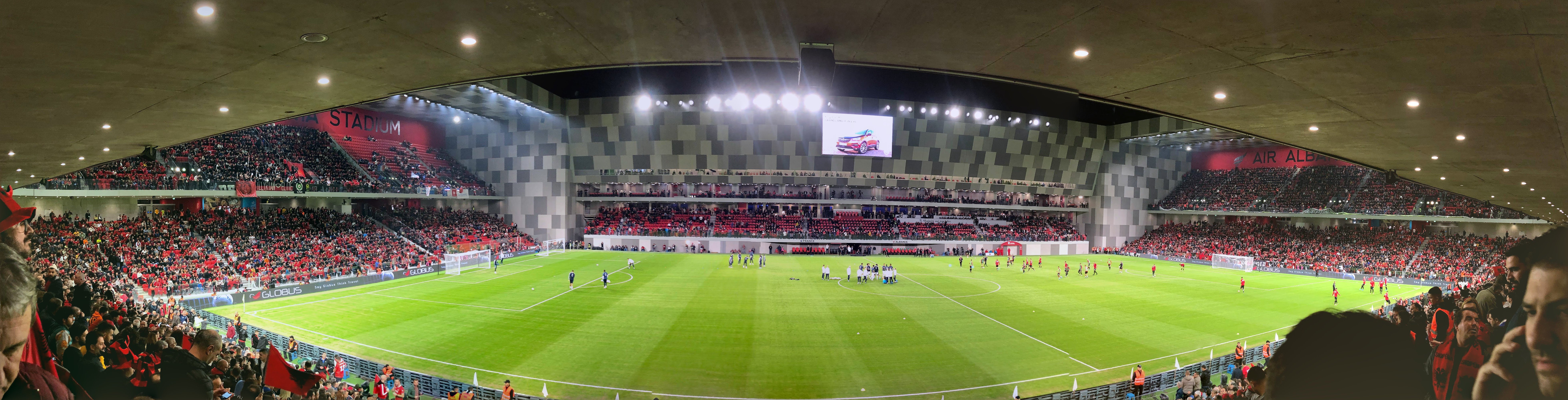
Interior overview in 2019...

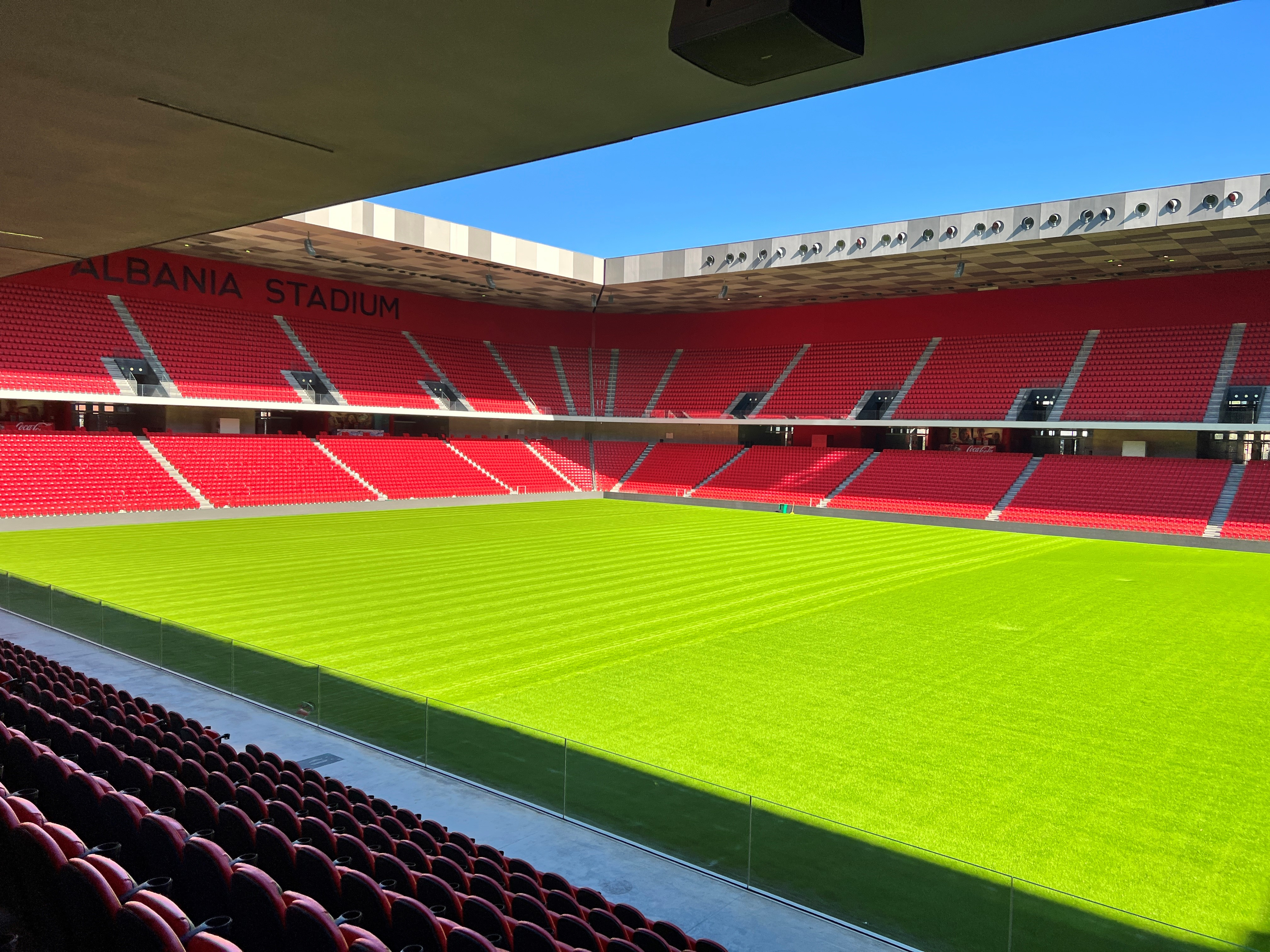
...and in 2022

== See also ==
- Air Albania
- Qemal Stafa Stadium
- List of tallest buildings in Albania
