= 1983–84 Feyenoord season =

Feyenoord
1983–84 season
- Chairman: Gerard Kerkum
- Manager: Thijs Libregts
- Stadium: De Kuip
- Eredivisie: 1st
- KNVB Cup: Winners
- UEFA Cup: Second round
- Top goalscorer: League: Peter Houtman (21 goals); All: Peter Houtman (25 goals)

During the 1983–84 season, Feyenoord participated in the Eredivisie, the KNVB Cup, and the UEFA Cup, winning the double. This was Johan Cruyff's last season as a footballer, having signed with Feyenoord due to his former club Ajax's refusal to offer him a new contract.

== Squad ==
Note: Flags indicate national team as defined under FIFA eligibility rules; some limited exceptions apply. Players may hold more than one non-FIFA nationality.

No.	Pos.	Nation	Player
—	GK	NED	Joop Hiele
—	GK	NED	Abe Knoop
—	GK	NED	Peter Brunings
—	DF	NED	Michel van de Korput
—	DF	NED	André Stafleu
—	DF	NED	Henk Duut
—	DF	DEN	Ivan Nielsen
—	DF	NED	Stanley Brard

No.	Pos.	Nation	Player
—	DF	NED	Sjaak Troost
—	DF	NED	Ben Wijnstekers
—	MF	NED	Ruud Brood
—	MF	NED	Wim van Til
—	MF	NED	André Hoekstra
—	MF	NED	Johan Cruyff
—	MF	NED	Ruud Gullit
—	MF	BUL	Andrey Zhelyazkov
—	MF	NED	Mario Been
—	FW	NED	Pierre Vermeulen
—	FW	NED	Peter Houtman
—	FW	NED	Willy Carbo

== Competitions ==
=== Matches ===
21 August 1983 1	FC Volendam	1–4	Feyenoord	Volendam
	Holshuijsen 60'		Hoekstra 3'; Houtman 25', 38'; Zhelyazkov 52'	Stadium: Kras Stadion; Attendance: 17,000; Referee: Egbert Mulder

24 August 1983 2	Feyenoord	5–2	Helmond Sport	Rotterdam
	Andries 44' (og.); Zhelyazkov 46', 69'; Cruyff 49'; Houtman 79'		Lubse 7'; Corbijn 61'	Stadium: De Kuip; Attendance: 24,320; Referee: Gerard Geurds

28 August 1983 3	Feyenoord	5–2	Fortuna Sittard	Rotterdam
	André Hoekstra 45'; Zhelyazkov 52'; Vermeulen 56'; Gullit 60'; Been 89'		Huub Smeets 22', 84'	Stadium: De Kuip; Attendance: 24,090; Referee: Bouke Draaismas

31 August 1983 4	FC Den Bosch	1–1	Feyenoord	Den Bosch
	van der Horst 9'		Cruyff 39'	Stadium: De Vliert; Attendance: 25,000; Referee: Piet Bosman

3 September 1983 5	HFC Haarlem	0–1	Feyenoord	Haarlem
			Houtman 69'	Stadium: Haarlem Stadion; Attendance: 7,550; Referee: Henk van Ettekoven

11 September 1983 6	Feyenoord	2–0	FC Groningen	Rotterdam
	Duut 44'; Hoekstra 55'			Stadium: De Kuip; Attendance: 25,889; Referee: Ignace van Swieten

18 September 1983 7	Ajax	8–2	Feyenoord	Amsterdam
	Olsen 5', 84'; Van Basten 15', 73', 87'; Boeve 24'; Molenaar 61'; Koeman 64' (pen.)		Houtman 28'; Duut 34'	Stadium: Olympisch Stadion Amsterdam; Attendance: 40,000; Referee: Gerard Geurds

25 September 1983 8	Feyenoord	2–0	Go Ahead Eagles	Rotterdam
	Gullit 42', 74'			Stadium: De Kuip; Attendance: 21,609; Referee: Egbert Mulder

2 October 1983 9	AZ'67	0–1	Feyenoord	Alkmaar
			Hoekstra 76'	Stadium: Alkmaarderhout; Attendance: 7,500; Referee: Jan Mulder

16 October 1983 10	Feyenoord	1–1	PSV Eindhoven	Rotterdam
	Zhelyazkov 57'		Koolhof 71'	Stadium: De Kuip; Attendance: 33,076; Referee: Egbert Mulder

23 October 1983 11	Roda JC	0–4	Feyenoord	Kerkrade
			Zhelyazkov 34', 40'; Hoekstra 66', 71'	Stadium: Gemeentelijk Sportpark Kaalheide; Attendance: 16,500; Referee: Ignace van Swieten

30 October 1983 12	Feyenoord	4–0	RV & AV Excelsior	Rotterdam
	Cruyf 17', 42'; Hoekstra 68'; Gullit 87'			Stadium: De Kuip; Attendance: 21,161; Referee: Piet Bosman

6 November 1983 13	Sparta Rotterdam	1–4	Feyenoord	Rotterdam
	Lengkeek 90'		Vermeulen 69'; André Hoekstra 76', 89'; Houtman 76' (pen.)	Stadium: Het Kasteel; Attendance: 20,000; Referee: Bep Thomas

20 November 1983 14	Feyenoord	2–1	DS'79	Rotterdam
	Houtman 9'; Gullit 86'		Van der Wiel 23'	Stadium: De Kuip; Attendance: 19,213; Referee: Jan Keizer

4 December 1983 16	Feyenoord	4–0	Willem II	Rotterdam
	Zhelyazkov 26'; Houtman 52', 56', 88'			Stadium: De Kuip; Attendance: 21,000; Referee: Gerard de Schepper

11 December 1983 17	Zwolle	2–2	Feyenoord	Zwolle
	Van Moorst 7'; Gullit 32' (og.)		Houtman 67'; Stafleu 87'	Stadium: Oosterenkstadion; Attendance: 15,000; Referee: Ignace van Swieten

21 December 1983 15	FC Utrecht	0–2	Feyenoord	Utrecht
			Gullit 10'; Cruyff 39'	Stadium: Stadion Galgenwaard; Attendance: 19,000; Referee: Gerard Geurds

15 January 1984 18	Feyenoord	2–0	FC Volendam	Rotterdam
	Gullit 10'; Cruyff 59'			Stadium: De Kuip; Attendance: 14,702; Referee: George Oetelmans

22 January 1984 19	Helmond Sport	0–5	Feyenoord	Helmond
			Stafleu 6'; Hoekstra 10'; Houtman 24'; Brard 71'; Been 79'	Stadium: GS Staalwerken Stadion; Attendance: 7,000; Referee: Bouke Draaisma

5 February 1984 21	Feyenoord	1–1	FC Den Bosch	Rotterdam
	Stafleu 24'		Van der Horst 42'	Stadium: De Kuip; Attendance: 19,500; Referee: Chris van der Laar

12 February 1984 22	Feyenoord	7–2	HFC Haarlem	Rotterdam
	Hoekstra 1', 6', 32'; Gullit 51', 69', 90'; Verkaik 72' (o.g.)		Van Hameren 63'; Wim Balm 67'	Stadium: De Kuip; Attendance: 16,519; Referee: Bep Thomas

19 February 1984 23	FC Groningen	1–0	Feyenoord	Groningen
	McDonald 68'			Stadium: Oosterpark; Attendance: 17,000; Referee: Cees Bakker

26 February 1984 24	Feyenoord	4–1	Ajax	Rotterdam
	Gullit 12'; Cruyff 14'; Hoekstra 78'; Duut 89'		Mølby 49'	Stadium: De Kuip; Attendance: 58,000; Referee: Egbert Mulder

10 March 1984 20	Fortuna Sittard	0–4	Feyenoord	Sittard
			Troost 6'; Hoekstra 11', 74'; Gullit 88'	Stadium: De Baandert; Attendance: 15,000; Referee: Jan Keizer

17 March 1984 25	Go Ahead Eagles	1–1	Feyenoord	Deventer
	Veldmate 66'		Brard 74'	Stadium: De Adelaarshorst; Attendance: 16,000; Referee: Gerard Geurds

25 March 1984 26	Feyenoord	5–2	AZ'67	Rotterdam
	Houtman 8', 35', 61'; Wijnstekers 65'; Duut 79'		Talan 6'; Van der Poppe 67'	Stadium: De Kuip; Attendance: 19,447; Referee: Cees Bakker

31 March 1984 27	PSV Eindhoven	1–1	Feyenoord	Eindhoven
	Hysén 87'		Duut 29'	Stadium: Philips Stadion; Attendance: 28,000; Referee: Bep Thomas

8 April 1984 28	Feyenoord	5–2	Roda JC	Rotterdam
	Gullit 21'; Hoekstra 34', 53'; Houtman 40'; Nielsen 90'		Eriksen 32'; Guthrie 36'	Stadium: De Kuip; Attendance: 20,931; Referee: Jan Keizer

15 April 1984 29	RV & AV Excelsior	0–2	Feyenoord	Rotterdam
			Houtman 69' (pen.), 72'	Stadium: Van Donge & De Roo Stadion; Attendance: 19,130; Referee: John Blankenstein

21 April 1984 30	Feyenoord	0–0	Sparta Rotterdam	Rotterdam
				Stadium: De Kuip; Attendance: 35,897; Referee: Gerard Geurds

23 April 1984 31	DS'79	0–3	Feyenoord	Dordrecht
			Wijnstekers 27'; Cruyff 58', 65'	Stadium: M-Scores Stadion; Attendance: 8,000; Referee: Chris Verhoef

29 April 1984 32	Feyenoord	3–0	FC Utrecht	Rotterdam
	Gullit 59', 88'; Hoekstra 90'			Stadium: De Kuip; Attendance: 31,038; Referee: Bouke Draaisma

6 May 1984 33	Willem II	0–5	Feyenoord	Tilburg
			Cruyff 13'; Duut 42'; Houtman 50', 85'; Brard 79'	Attendance: 12,500; Referee: Henk van Ettekoven

13 May 1984 34	Feyenoord	2–1	PEC Zwolle '82	Rotterdam
	Cruyff 13'; Houtman 76'		Booij 4'	Stadium: De Kuip; Attendance: 33,263; Referee: Jan Severein

=== KNVB Cup ===
9 October 1983 First round	SC Heerenveen	0–1	Feyenoord	Heerenveen
			Hoekstra 4'	Stadium: Sportpark Noord; Attendance: 10,000; Referee: Bep Thomas

23 November 1983 Second round	Feyenoord	7–0	USV Elinkwijk	Rotterdam
	Vermeulen 8'; Gullit 29', 55', 56'; Zhelyazkov 63' van de Korput 66' (pen.); Stafleu 82'			Stadium: De Kuip; Attendance: 3,785; Referee: Chris Verhoef

31 January 1984 Round of 16	Ajax	2–2	Feyenoord	Amsterdam
	Rijkaard 49' van Basten 68'		Houtman 20'; Gullit 53'	Stadium: De Meer Stadion; Attendance: 29,000; Referee: Jan Keizer

15 February 1984 Round of 16 replay	Feyenoord	2–1 (a.e.t)	Ajax	Rotterdam
	Houtman 3', 97' (pen.)		van Basten 83'	Stadium: De Kuip; Attendance: 57,000; Referee: Ignace van Swieten

3 March 1984 Quarter-finals	Feyenoord	6–1	NEC Nijmegen	Rotterdam
	Hoekstra 7', 79'; Wijnstekers 9'; Cruyff 13'; Gullit 43', 57'		Grim 1'	Stadium: De Kuip; Attendance: 11,801; Referee: Jan Severein

27 March 1984 Semi-finals	Feyenoord	1–1	HFC Haarlem	Rotterdam
	Gullit 53'		Balm 62' (pen.)	Stadium: De Kuip; Attendance: 14,589

9 April 1984 Semi-final replay	HFC Haarlem	1–4	Feyenoord	Haarlem
	Keur 64'		Gullit 2', 57'; Duut 40'; Carbo 85'	Stadium: Haarlem Stadion; Attendance: 17,000; Referee: Ignace van Swieten

1 May 1984 Final	Feyenoord	1–0	Fortuna Sittard	Rotterdam
	Houtman 72'			Stadium: De Kuip

=== First round ===
14 September 1983 First leg	St Mirren (Scotland)	0–1	Feyenoord (Netherlands)	Paisley
			Gullit 29'	Stadium: St Mirren Park; Attendance: 10,301; Referee: Svein Inge Thime

28 September 1983 Second leg	Feyenoord (Netherlands)	2–0	St Mirren (Scotland)	Rotterdam
	van Til 58'; Zhelyazkov 76'			Stadium: De Kuip; Attendance: 18,286; Referee: Augusto Marques Pires

=== Second round ===
19 October 1983 First leg	Tottenham Hotspur (England)	4–2	Feyenoord (Netherlands)	London
	Archibald 7', 33'; Galvin 19', 39'		Cruyff 75'; Nielsen 81'	Stadium: White Hart Lane; Attendance: 35,404; Referee: Emilio Carlos Guruceta Muro

2 November 1984 Second leg	Feyenoord (Netherlands)	0–2	Tottenham Hotspur (England)	Rotterdam
			Hughton 25'; Galvin 84'	Stadium: De Kuip; Attendance: 45,061; Referee: Luigi Agnolin
