= André Hoekstra =

Dutch footballer and manager

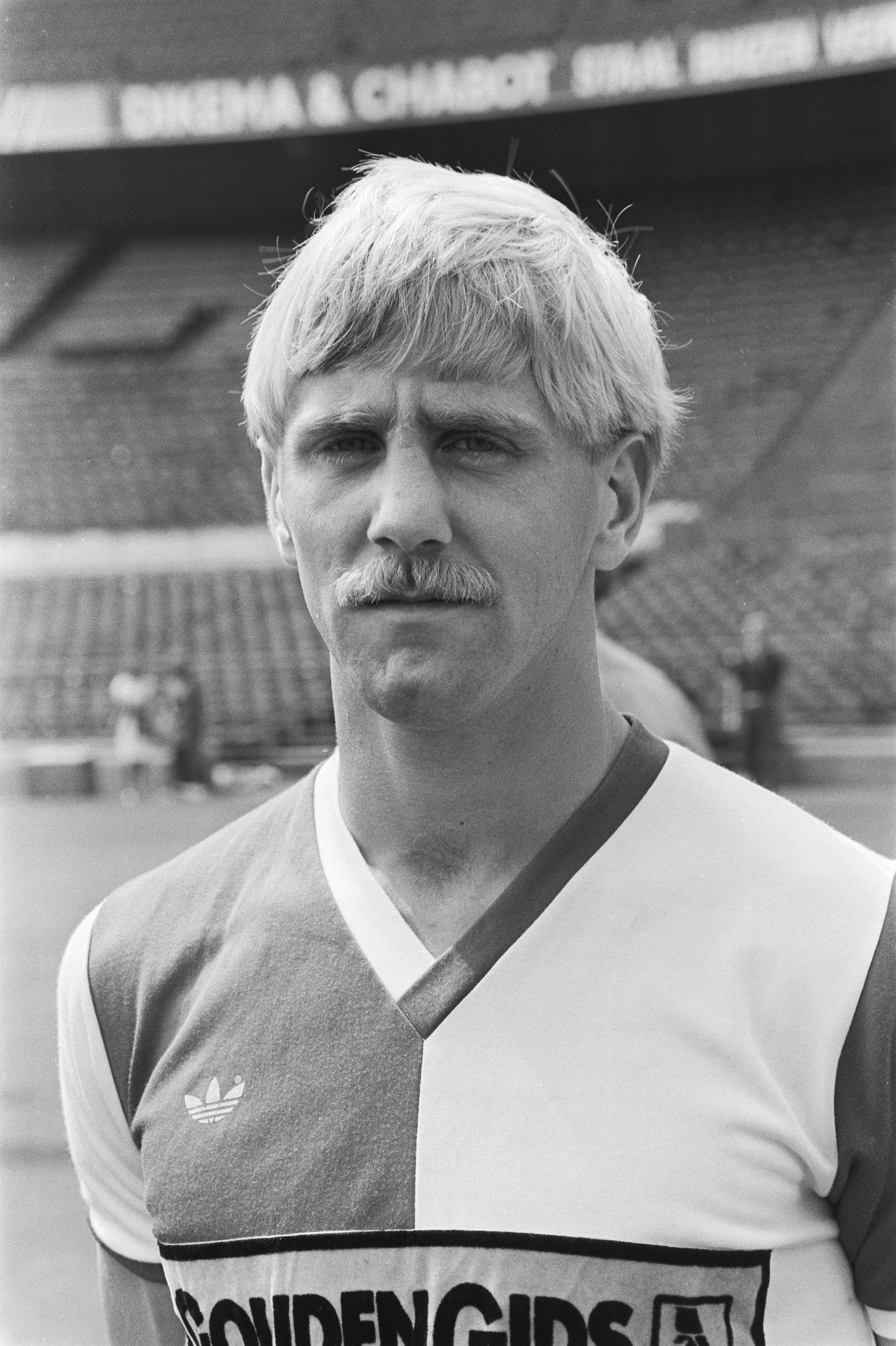

Personal information
- Full name: André Hoekstra
- Date of birth: 5 April 1962 (age 64)
- Place of birth: Baarn, Netherlands
- Position: Forward

Youth career
- CVV Zwervers
- Capelle
- Feyenoord

Senior career*
Years	Team	Apps	(Gls)
1981–1988	Feyenoord	181	(66)
1988–1994	RKC	137	(40)
Total		318	(106)

International career
1984	Netherlands	1	(1)

Managerial career
- 1994–1996: RBC (assistant)
- 1996–1998: ADO Den Haag (assistant)
- 1998–1999: ADO Den Haag
- 1999–2021: Excelsior (asst. & academy)
- * Club domestic league appearances and goals

André Hoekstra (born 5 April 1962 in Baarn) is a Dutch retired footballer who played as a Forward or attacking midfielder.

== Club career ==
Nicknamed Koko (after Cambuur player Koko Hoekstra), Hoekstra came through the youth ranks of amateur side CVV Zwervers and made his professional debut for Feyenoord in April 1982. Also named Koning van de kluts due to his ability to tap in goals in goalmouth scrambles, he had a lenghty spell at RKC as well.

After his playing career he became a manager and served as an assistant coach with RBC Roosendaal, ADO Den Haag, and Excelsior, also holding the position of head coach with ADO Den Haag between 1998 and 1999. He stayed with Excelsior for 22 years until the club sacked him in 2021. He then worked as an assistant manager for Kozakken Boys and SteDoCo.

== International career ==
Hoekstra earned one cap for the Netherlands, in an 6-0 win over a famous Danish Dynamite team in which he also scored.

== Personal life ==
After his sacking by Excelsior, Hoekstra worked at a sawmill.

== Career statistics ==
- First match: 6 April 1982: Feyenoord Rotterdam – Roda JC, 1–0

== Honours ==
Feyenoord

- Eredivisie: 1983–84
- KNVB Cup: 1983–84
