= Ben Wijnstekers =

Dutch footballer

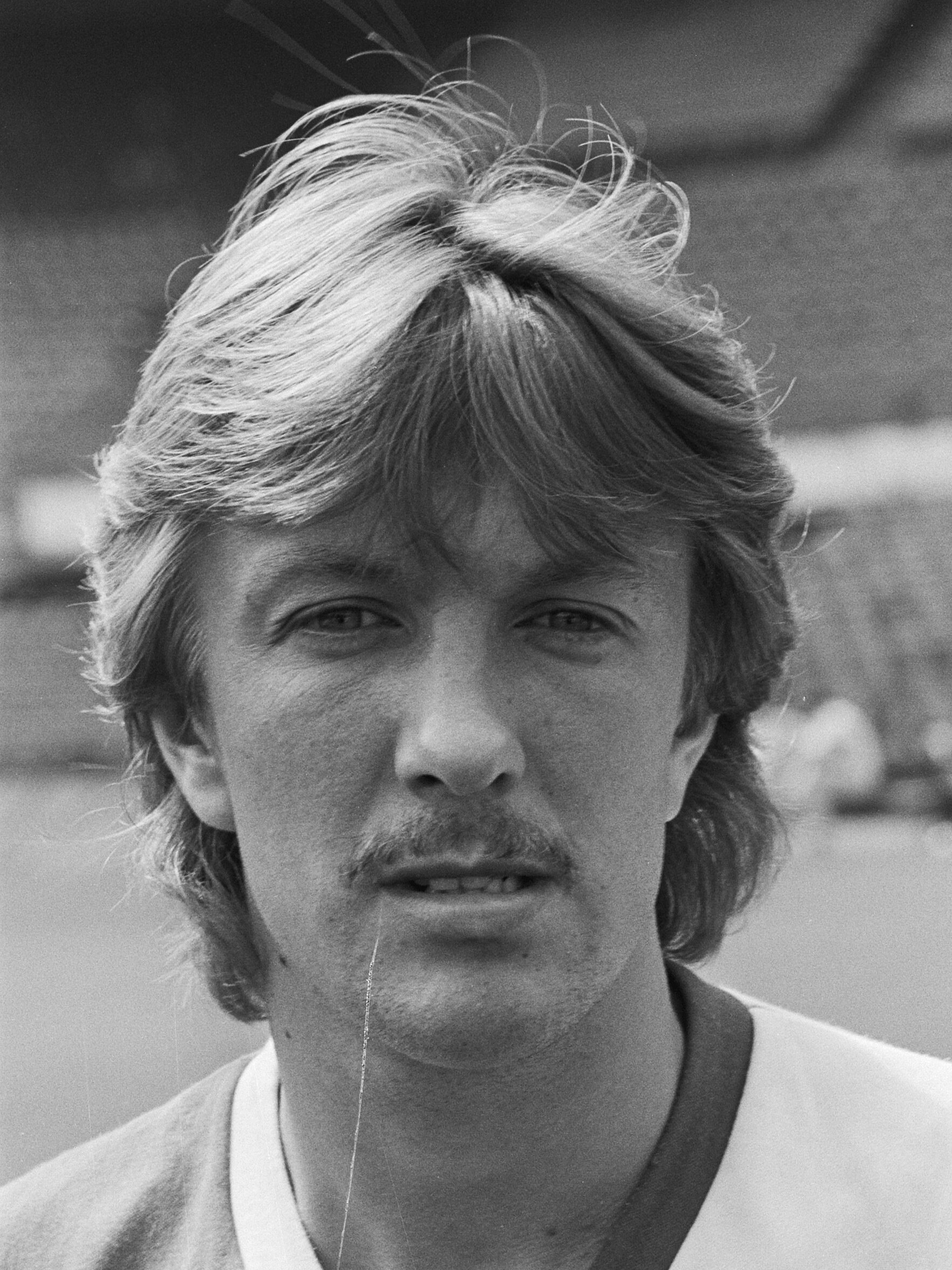
- Wijnstekers at Feyenoord in 1982

Personal information
- Full name: Hubertus Johannes Nicolaas Wijnstekers
- Date of birth: 31 August 1955 (age 71)
- Place of birth: Rotterdam, Netherlands
- Position: Defender

Youth career
- RVAV Overmaas
- Feyenoord Rotterdam

Senior career*
Years	Team	Apps	(Gls)
1975–1988	Feyenoord Rotterdam	352	(14)
1988–1990	RC Mechelen	57	(0)
1990–1991	Germinal Ekeren	7	(0)

International career^{‡}
1979–1985	Netherlands	36	(1)
- * Club domestic league appearances and goals as of 6 June 2007 ‡ National team caps and goals as of 6 June 2007

Hubertus Johannes Nicolaas "Ben" (or "Bennie") Wijnstekers (Dutch pronunciation: [bɛɱ ˈʋɛinsteːkərs]; born 31 August 1955) is a Dutch retired footballer who was active as a defender. Wijnstekers made his professional debut at Feyenoord Rotterdam on 7 June 1976 against De Graafschap (finale score 8–0). He also played for K.R.C. Mechelen and Germinal Ekeren.

Wijnstekers earned 36 caps for the Netherlands national football team, scoring one goal, and captaining the team during 19 matches.

== Career statistics ==
=== International ===
Appearances and goals by national team and year
National team	Year	Apps	Goals
Netherlands	1979	3	0
Netherlands	1980	8	0
Netherlands	1981	5	0
Netherlands	1982	4	0
Netherlands	1983	7	1
Netherlands	1984	3	0
Netherlands	1985	6	0
Total		36	1

Scores and results list the Netherlands' goal tally first, score column indicates score after each Wijnstekers goal.

List of international goals scored by Ben Wijnstekers
No.	Date	Venue	Opponent	Score	Result	Competition
1	17 December 1983	De Kuip, Rotterdam, Netherlands	Malta	2–0	5–0	UEFA Euro 1984 qualification

== Honours ==
Feyenoord

- Eredivisie: 1983-84
- KNVB Cup: 1979-80, 1983-84
