= Wagenburg =

Wagenburg may refer to:

- Wagenburg (wagon fort), a temporary fortification made of wagons
- Wagenburg (trailer park), a humorous term for trailer parks
- Wagenburg (museum), the Imperial Carriage Museum in Vienna, Austria
- Wagenburg (Seegräben), a settlement in the municipality of Seegräben in Switzerland

== See also ==
- Wagenberg
- Wagenborgen
