= Ivan Nielsen =

Danish footballer (born 1956)

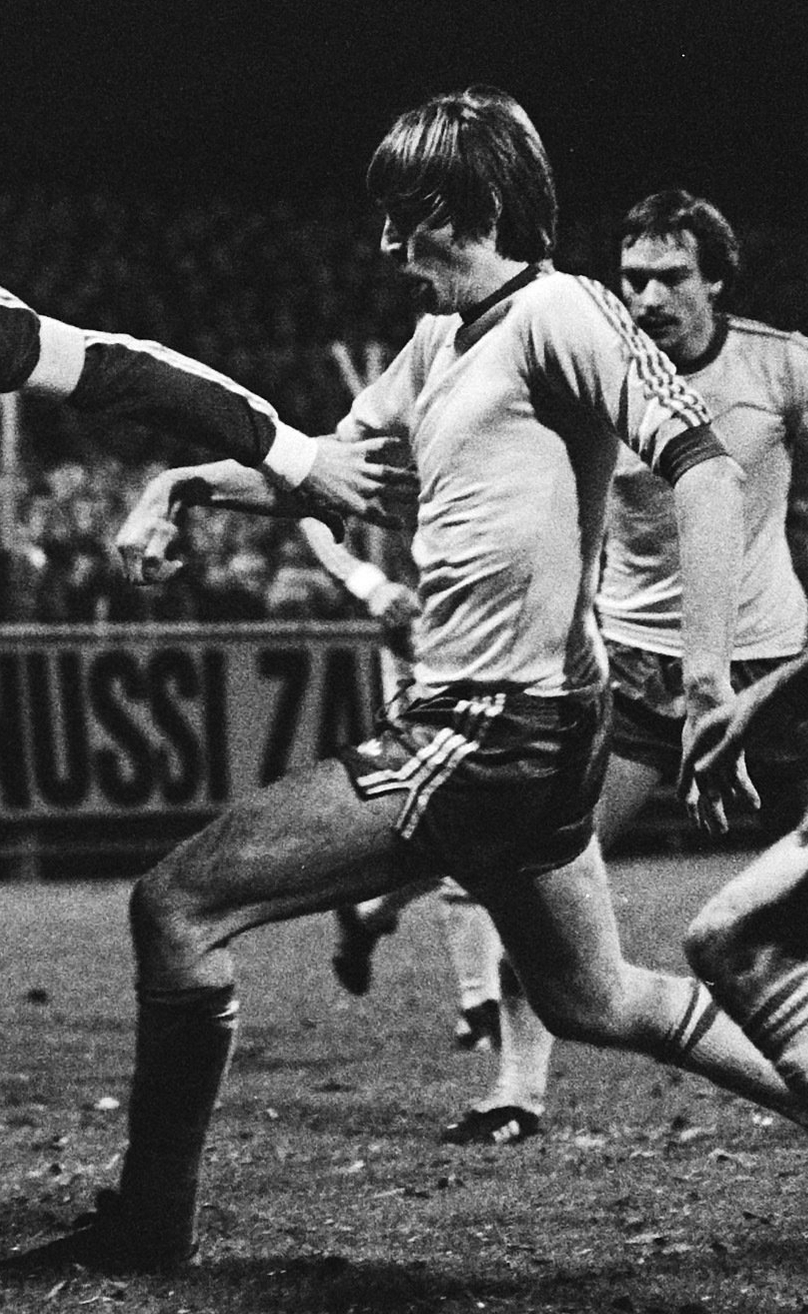
- Nielsen (1979)

Personal information
- Date of birth: 9 October 1956 (age 70)
- Place of birth: Frederiksberg, Denmark
- Height: 6 ft 4 in (1.93 m)
- Position: Defender

Senior career*
Years	Team	Apps	(Gls)
1975–1979	Fremad Amager		
1979–1986	Feyenoord	195	(14)
1986–1990	PSV	83	(5)
1990–1991	Fremad Amager		
1991–1992	B 1903	25	(1)
1992–1993	Copenhagen	20	(2)
1993	Næstved		

International career
1977–1979	Denmark under-21	6	(1)
1980–1989	Denmark	51	(0)

Managerial career
- 1993: Næstved
- 1995–1996: Dragør
- * Club domestic league appearances and goals

Ivan Nielsen (born 9 October 1956) is a Danish former professional football player, who most prominently played professionally for Dutch clubs Feyenoord Rotterdam and PSV Eindhoven, winning the European Cup with PSV. A central defender, he was capped 51 times for the Danish national team, and represented his country at 1986 World Cup and two European Championship tournaments.

== Biography ==
Born on Frederiksberg in Copenhagen, Ivan Nielsen started his senior career with Fremad Amager in 1975. He debuted for the Danish under-21 national team in September 1977, and went on to play six games and score one goal for the under-21 national team. In 1979, he moved abroad to play professionally with Feyenoord Rotterdam in the Dutch Eredivisie championship.

He was a part of the Feyenoord team which won the 1980 Dutch Cup, and made his debut for the Danish national team under national team manager Sepp Piontek in November 1980. In 1984, Nielsen and Feyenoord won both the 1984 Eredivisie championship and Dutch Cup trophy. He was called up for the Danish national team at the 1984 European Championship. He played full time in Denmark's four games at the tournament, before the team was eliminated in the semi-finals. He was also called up for the 1986 World Cup, where he played three games as Denmark reached the round of 16. After seven seasons at Feyenoord, he left the club in 1986.

Moving on to defending Eredivisie champions PSV Eindhoven, Nielsen joined up with fellow Danish internationals Frank Arnesen and Jan Heintze. Nielsen helped PSV win three Eredivisie championships in a row from 1987 to 1989, as well as the three Dutch Cups in a row from 1988 to 1990. His most notable result with PSV, was winning the international 1988 European Cup, when S.L. Benfica from Portugal were beaten on penalty shootout in the final. Nielsen represented the Danish national team in the 1988 European Championship tournament. The tournament was a disappointment for the Danish team, though Nielsen was one of few older players who played up to standard. He ended his national team career in November 1989, having never scored in his 51 national team games.

After four seasons at PSV, he returned to Denmark to end his career in 1990. He joined former club Fremad Amager, where he spent a single season. He moved to B 1903 in 1991, and when the club merged to form F.C. Copenhagen in 1992, Nielsen went on to play for the new club. He was a part of the Copenhagen team which won the 1993 Danish Superliga championship, in its first season of existence. After that season, he moved to Næstved IF, where he ended his career. He managed Næstved, and later Dragør Boldklub, before starting his own plumbing business in Copenhagen.

== Style of play ==
With his tall, 192 cm, and his strong body and stamina, he was a tough man-marker. In a 1986 World Cup match, he successfully marked Uruguayan star Enzo Francescoli, and left him unable to move and play his football. In the 7th minute he was booked for a strong tackle against Francescoli. Towards the end of the first half, Nielsen fouled him at the edge of the penalty area. The referee was close to the situation and awarded a penalty, on which Francescoli scored Uruguay's only goal (2–1) in Denmark's 6–1 win.

== Honours ==
Feyenoord

- Eredivisie: 1983–84
- KNVB Cup: 1979–80, 1983–84

PSV

- Eredivisie: 1986–87, 1987–88, 1988–89
- KNVB Cup: 1987–88, 1988–89, 1989–90
- European Cup: 1987–88

FC Copenhagen

- Danish Superliga: 1992–93
