= Michel van de Korput =

Dutch association footballer

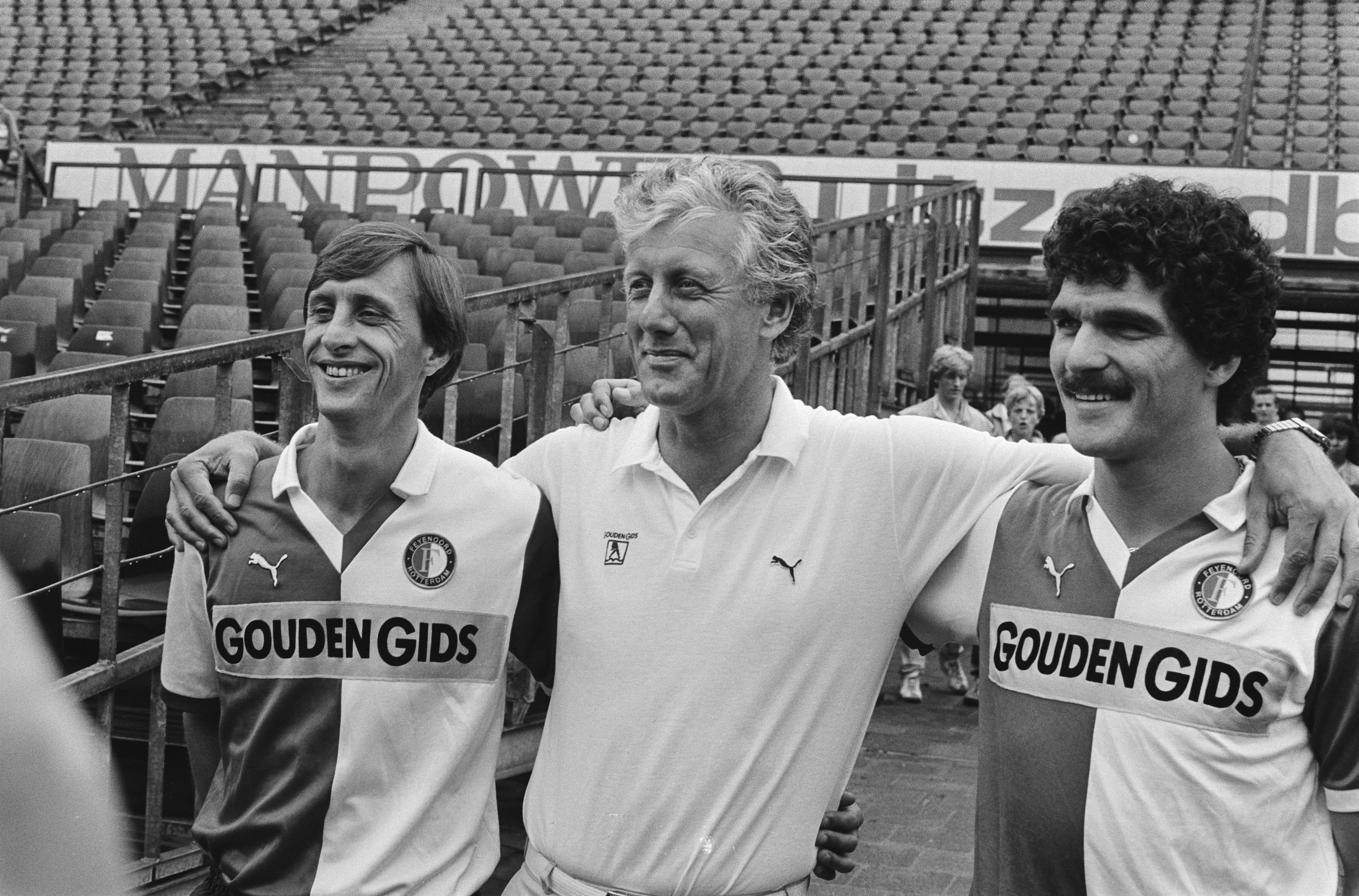
- Johan Cruyff, Thijs Libregts, and Michel van de Korput in 1983 after joining Feyenoord

Personal information
- Full name: Michael Antonius Bernardus van de Korput
- Date of birth: 18 September 1956 (age 70)
- Place of birth: Wagenberg, Netherlands
- Height: 1.83 m (6 ft 0 in)
- Position: Defender

Senior career*
Years	Team	Apps	(Gls)
1974–1980	Feyenoord	134	(1)
1980–1983	Torino	72	(2)
1983–1985	Feyenoord	62	(1)
1985–1987	1. FC Köln	27	(0)
1987–1989	Germinal Ekeren		
1989–1990	Cappellen		

International career
1978–1985	Netherlands	23	(0)
- * Club domestic league appearances and goals

Michaël "Michel" Antonius Bernardus van de Korput (Dutch pronunciation: [ˈmiʃɛl vɑn də ˈkɔrpʏt]; born 18 September 1956 in Wagenberg) is a retired Dutch footballer.

He also earned 23 caps for the Netherlands national football team from 1979 to 1985, and participated in UEFA Euro 1980.

== Career statistics ==
=== International ===
Appearances and goals by national team and year
National team	Year	Apps	Goals
Netherlands	1979	2	0
Netherlands	1980	6	0
Netherlands	1981	3	0
Netherlands	1982	7	0
Netherlands	1983	1	0
Netherlands	1984	0	0
Netherlands	1985	4	0
Total		23	0

== Honours ==
Feyenoord

- Eredivisie: 1983-84
- KNVB Cup: 1979-80, 1983-84
