= Peter Houtman =

Dutch footballer (born 1957)

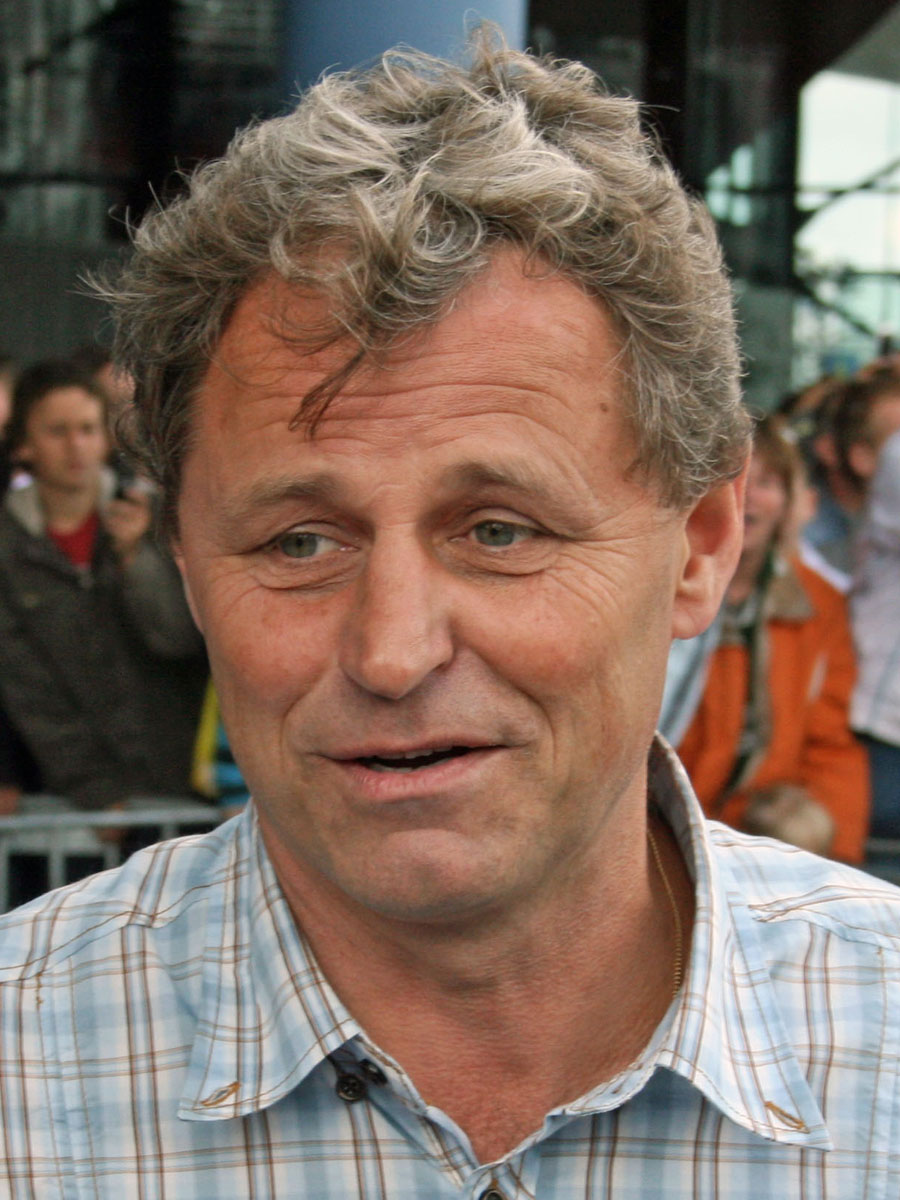
- Houtman in 2007

Personal information
- Date of birth: 4 June 1957 (age 69)
- Place of birth: Rotterdam, Netherlands
- Position: Striker

Youth career
- Meeuwenplaat
- 1971-1976: Feyenoord

Senior career*
Years	Team	Apps	(Gls)
1976–1977	Feyenoord	0	(0)
1977–1978	Groningen	32	(24)
1978–1979	Feyenoord	15	(5)
1979	Club Brugge	15	(3)
1979–1982	Groningen	91	(55)
1982–1985	Feyenoord	96	(72)
1985–1987	Groningen	51	(30)
1987–1988	Sporting Lisbon	19	(3)
1988–1989	Feyenoord	21	(7)
1989–1991	Sparta	76	(32)
1991–1993	FC Den Haag	15	(2)
1993	Excelsior	16	(6)
Total		447	(239)

International career
1983–1985	Netherlands	8	(7)
- * Club domestic league appearances and goals

Peter Houtman (born 4 June 1957) is a Dutch retired footballer who played as a striker. He obtained eight caps for the Netherlands national team in the 1980s, scoring seven goals.

== Career ==
Born in the Oude Westen district, Rotterdam, Houtman and his family moved to Hoogvliet when he was a child and he started playing football at local club Meeuwenplaat. In 1971 Feyenoord snapped him up to play in their academy.

Houtman then embarked on a professional career that took him to Feyenoord and Groningen for whom he both had different spells. He also had spells with Club Brugge, Sporting CP, Sparta, FC Den Haag and Excelsior. For Feyenoord he scored 90 goals in 153 official matches. He is one of a handful of players who played for all three Rotterdam professional clubs.

After the end of his professional career, Houtman became the stadium announcer in De Kuip, the home stadium of his club Feyenoord, in 1998. Houtman decided to quit after the 2024-25 season, after 27 years of service, as he was diagnosed with Alzheimer's disease.

== Personal life ==
Houtman lives with his wife Rina in Nissewaard and they have a son, Jeffrey. In 2023, Houtman was named Knight in the Order of Orange Nassau.

== Career statistics ==
=== International ===
Appearances and goals by national team and year
National team	Year	Apps	Goals
Netherlands	1983	4	3
Netherlands	1984	3	3
Netherlands	1985	1	1
Total		8	7

Scores and results list the Netherlands' goal tally first, score column indicates score after each Houtman goal.

List of international goals scored by Peter Houtman
No.	Date	Venue	Opponent	Score	Result	Competition
1	7 September 1983	Stadion Oosterpark, Groningen, Netherlands	Iceland	3–0	3–0	UEFA Euro 1984 qualification
2	16 November 1983	De Kuip, Rotterdam, Netherlands	Spain	1–0	2–1	UEFA Euro 1984 qualification
3	17 December 1983	De Kuip, Rotterdam, Netherlands	Malta	4–0	5–0	UEFA Euro 1984 qualification
4	14 March 1985	De Meer, Amsterdam, Netherlands	Denmark	3–0	6–0	Friendly
5	14 March 1985	De Meer, Amsterdam, Netherlands	Denmark	5–0	6–0	Friendly
6	23 December 1984	Makario Stadium, Nicosia, Cyprus	Cyprus	1–0	1–0	1986 FIFA World Cup qualification
7	20 November 1985	De Kuip, Rotterdam, Netherlands	Belgium	1–0	2–1	1986 FIFA World Cup - UEFA Play-off

== Honours ==
Feyenoord

- Eredivisie: 1983-84
- KNVB Cup: 1983-84
