= 1983–84 Eerste Divisie =

28th season of the second-tier football league in Netherlands

Eerste Divisie
- Season: 1983–84
- Champions: MVV Maastricht
- Promoted: MVV Maastricht; FC Twente; NAC Breda
- Goals: 897
- Average goals/game: 3.29

The Dutch Eerste Divisie in the 1983–84 season was contested by 17 teams, one more than in the previous season. This was due to RBC Roosendaal, entering from the amateurs. MVV won the championship.

== New entrants ==
Entered from amateur football

- RBC Roosendaal

Relegated from the 1982–83 Eredivisie

- NAC Breda
- NEC
- FC Twente

== League standings ==
Pos	Team	Pld	W	D	L	GF	GA	GD	Pts	Promotion or qualification
1	MVV Maastricht	32	19	10	3	72	37	+35	48	Promoted to Eredivisie.
2	FC Twente	32	21	5	6	82	41	+41	47	Promoted to Eredivisie.
3	NAC Breda	32	18	5	9	72	49	+23	41	Qualified for Promotion play-off as Period champions.
4	SC Cambuur	32	13	12	7	50	37	+13	38	
5	Telstar	32	14	9	9	53	43	+10	37	
6	De Graafschap	32	13	10	9	55	47	+8	36	Qualified for Promotion play-off as Period champions.
7	FC Den Haag	32	15	5	12	49	39	+10	35	
8	FC Wageningen	32	11	13	8	42	46	−4	35	
9	NEC	32	14	5	13	47	44	+3	33	Qualified for Promotion play-off as Period champions.
10	VVV-Venlo	32	14	4	14	54	53	+1	32	Qualified for Promotion play-off as Period champions.
11	Vitesse Arnhem	32	12	8	12	51	55	−4	32	
12	SC Heracles	32	10	10	12	48	49	−1	30	
13	sc Heerenveen	32	8	9	15	46	63	−17	25	
14	RBC Roosendaal	32	7	7	18	45	61	−16	21	
15	FC Eindhoven	32	8	5	19	52	82	−30	21	
16	SC Veendam	32	5	9	18	43	78	−35	19	
17	SVV	32	3	8	21	36	73	−37	14	

Source: rsssf.com

== Promotion competition ==
In the promotion competition, four period winners (the best teams during each of the four quarters of the regular competition) played for promotion to the eredivisie.

Pos	Team	Pld	W	D	L	GF	GA	GD	Pts	Promotion
1	NAC Breda	6	4	2	0	12	3	+9	10	Promoted to Eredivisie.
2	VVV-Venlo	6	3	1	2	12	7	+5	7	
3	De Graafschap	6	0	4	2	6	12	−6	4	
4	NEC	6	1	1	4	8	16	−8	3	

Source: rsssf.com

== Attendances ==
#	Club	Average
1	Twente	8,134
2	Cambuur	7,075
3	De Graafschap	5,194
4	NAC	4,697
5	MVV	4,006
6	RBC	3,631
7	Heerenveen	3,456
8	Heracles	3,213
9	Den Haag	2,863
10	VVV	2,847
11	Telstar	2,713
12	Wageningen	2,503
13	NEC	2,475
14	Eindhoven	2,200
15	Vitesse	2,175
16	Veendam	1,506
17	SVV	1,036

== See also ==
- 1983–84 Eredivisie
- 1983–84 KNVB Cup
