= Rick Talan =

Dutch footballer (1960–2015)

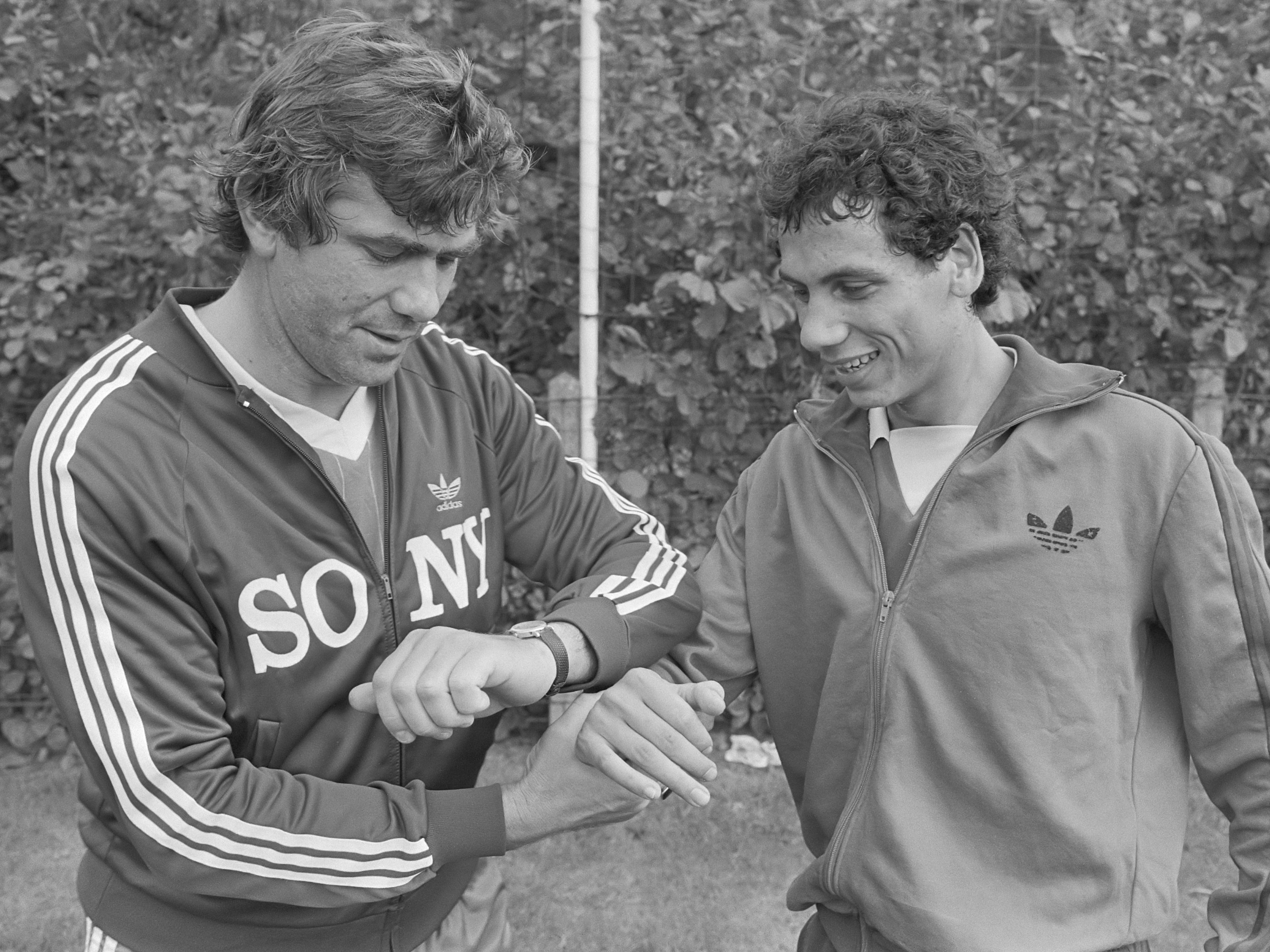
- Talan (right) with Hans Eijkenbroek in 1982

Personal information
- Date of birth: 3 November 1960
- Place of birth: Katwijk, Netherlands
- Date of death: 30 September 2015 (aged 54)
- Place of death: Zevenaar, Netherlands
- Position: Striker

Youth career
- Katwijk

Senior career*
Years	Team	Apps	(Gls)
1979–1985	AZ'67	95	(39)
1981–1982	→ Cercle Brugge (loan)	13	(2)
1985	→ Haarlem (loan)	13	(2)
1986–1988	Vitesse Arnhem	78	(38)
Total		199	(81)
- * Club domestic league appearances and goals

Rick Talan (3 November 1960 – 30 September 2015) was a Dutch footballer who played as a striker.

== Club career ==
Talan started his career with local amateur side Katwijk and joined AZ'67 in 1978. He scored 44 goals in 95 official matches for the club and was part of the squad that won the club's first Eredivisie title in 1981. In the 1983–84 Eredivisie season he scored 20 goals in 33 league games for AZ. In 1982, he played half a year for Belgian side Cercle Brugge, scoring twice in 14 official matches.

He finished his career in 1988 after playing almost 100 games with Vitesse Arnhem.

== Personal life and death ==
Talan's younger brother Jeffrey also became a professional footballer and earned eight senior caps for the Netherlands. Talan owned an accountancy company in Zevenaar.

Rick Talan suffered from a brain tumor in 2007 and underwent two operations. The tumor however returned a year later and he died in September 2015.

== Honours ==
AZ'67

- Eredivisie: 1981
