= Henk Schouten =

Dutch footballer

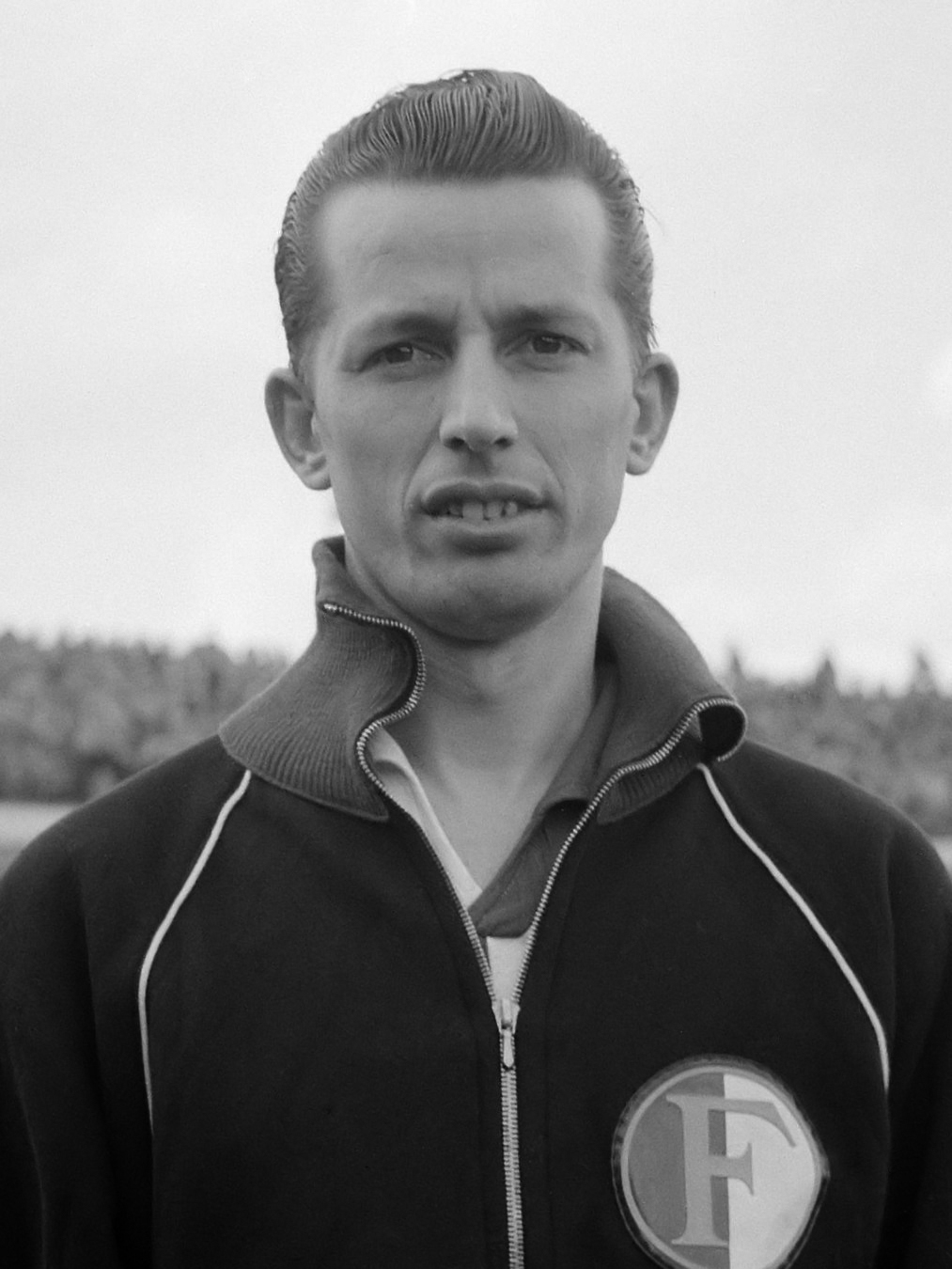
- Schouten (1961)

Personal information
- Full name: Henk Schouten
- Date of birth: 16 April 1932
- Place of birth: Rotterdam, Netherlands
- Date of death: 18 April 2018 (aged 86)
- Position: Midfielder

Youth career
- Excelsior Rotterdam

Senior career*
Years	Team	Apps	(Gls)
1950–1954	Excelsior Rotterdam	?	(?)
1954–1955	Holland Sport	?	(?)
1955–1963	Feijenoord	194	(125)
1963–1967	Excelsior Rotterdam	?	(?)

International career^{‡}
1955–1961	Netherlands	2	(0)
- * Club domestic league appearances and goals as of 9 June 2007 ‡ National team caps and goals as of 9 June 2007

Henk Schouten (16 April 1932 – 18 April 2018) was a Dutch footballer who was active as a midfielder. Schouten made his debut at Excelsior Rotterdam and also played for Holland Sport and Feijenoord.

Schouten died of pancreatic cancer on 18 April 2018 at the age of 86.

== Honours ==
- 1960-61 : Eredivisie winner with Feijenoord
- 1961-62 : Eredivisie winner with Feijenoord
