= Abe Knoop =

Dutch footballer and coach

Personal information
- Full name: Abe Knoop
- Date of birth: 28 August 1963 (age 63)
- Place of birth: Willemstad, Netherlands Antilles (now Curaçao)
- Height: 1.87 m (6 ft 2 in)
- Position: Goalkeeper

Team information
- Current team: Iran

Senior career*
Years	Team	Apps	(Gls)
1983–1984	Feyenoord	1	(0)
1984–1985	NSVV		
1985–1986	Vv Barendrecht		
1986–1987	Sparta Rotterdam	0	(0)
1987–1990	FC Wageningen	94	(0)
1990	Ajax		
1991	Neptunus		
1991–1998	Vitesse	14	(0)
Total		109	(0)

Managerial career
- 1998–2005: Vitesse (goalkeeping coach)
- 2005–2006: S.L. Benfica (goalkeeping coach)
- 2006–2007: Al-Jazira (goalkeeping coach)
- 2009–2010: Iran (goalkeeping coach)
- 2022–: PSV (goalkeeping coach)
- * Club domestic league appearances and goals

Abe Knoop (born 28 August 1963 in Curaçao) is a Dutch professional football goalkeeping coach. He is currently the goalkeeping coach of the Iran national football team under the wing of Afshin Ghotbi.

During his playing career, Knoop was primarily used as a reserve goalkeeper, but he made a few Eredivisie appearances for Feyenoord and Vitesse.
