= Wim Balm =

Dutch footballer (born 1960)

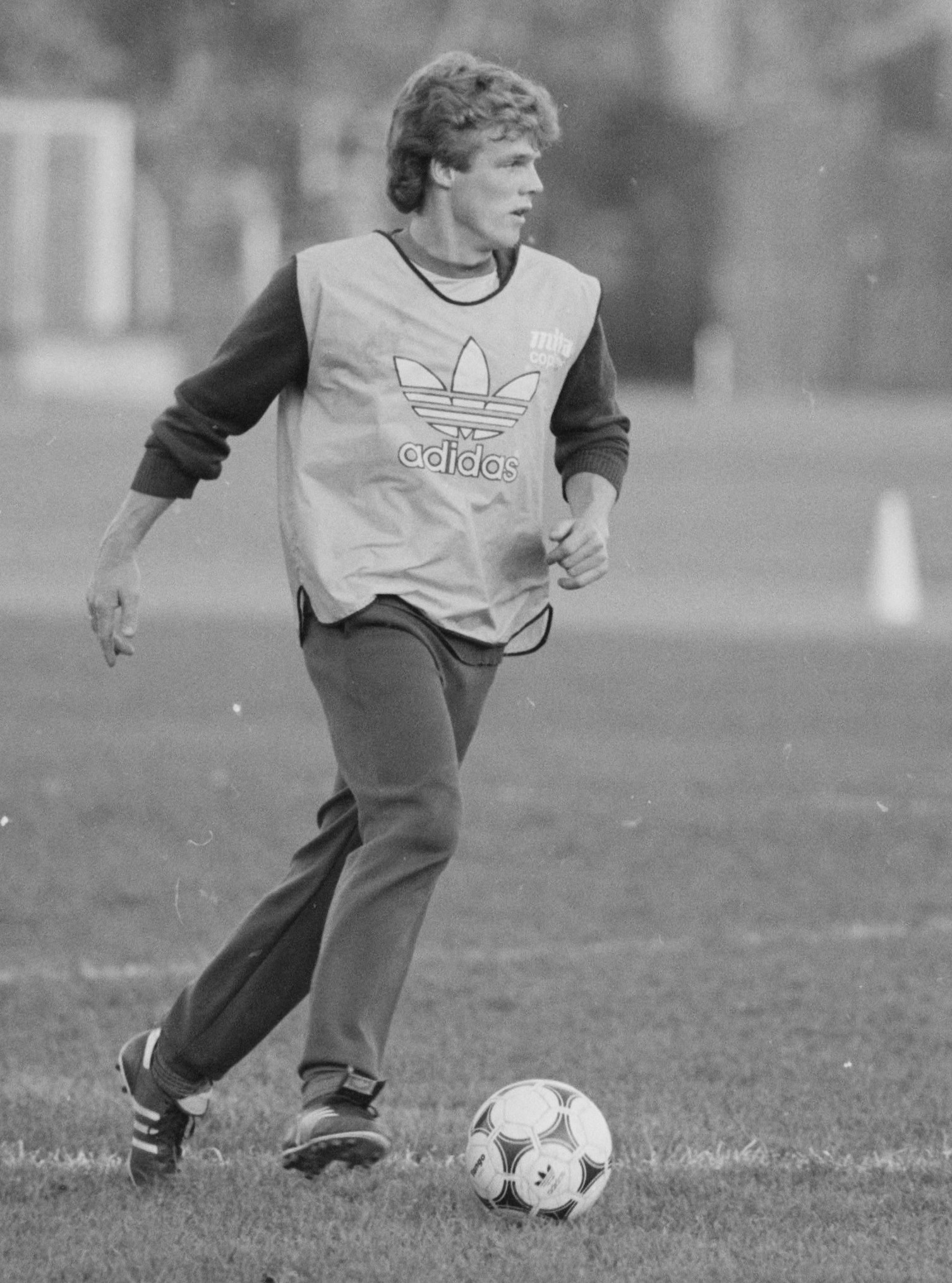

Personal information
- Date of birth: 24 February 1960 (age 66)
- Place of birth: Haarlem
- Position: Midfielder

Senior career*
Years	Team	Apps	(Gls)
1978–1987	Haarlem	265	(53)
1987–1989	Twente	68	(15)
1989–1994	Vard		

International career
1979-1980	Netherlands U-21	6	(0)

Managerial career
- 2010–2011: Haugar (women)
- * Club domestic league appearances and goals

Wim Balm (born 24 February 1960) is a Dutch retired footballer.

He played for Haarlem and Twente in his home country, then emigrated to Norway to play for SK Vard Haugesund. Staying in Norway, he later coached the women's team of SK Haugar.

With Haarlem, he played in the 1982–83 UEFA Cup including in the Luzhniki disaster game. In 2007 he scored in a game held in remembrance of the disaster.

He once scored 4 goals in one Eredivisie match, playing for FC Twente against RKC in October 1988.

He also played 6 games for the Netherlands U-21 national football team and was called-up for the senior national team in 1984.

== Personal life ==
Balm lives in Norway with his Norwegian wife and three kids.
