= Sportpark Noord =

Multi-use stadium in Heerenveen, Netherlands

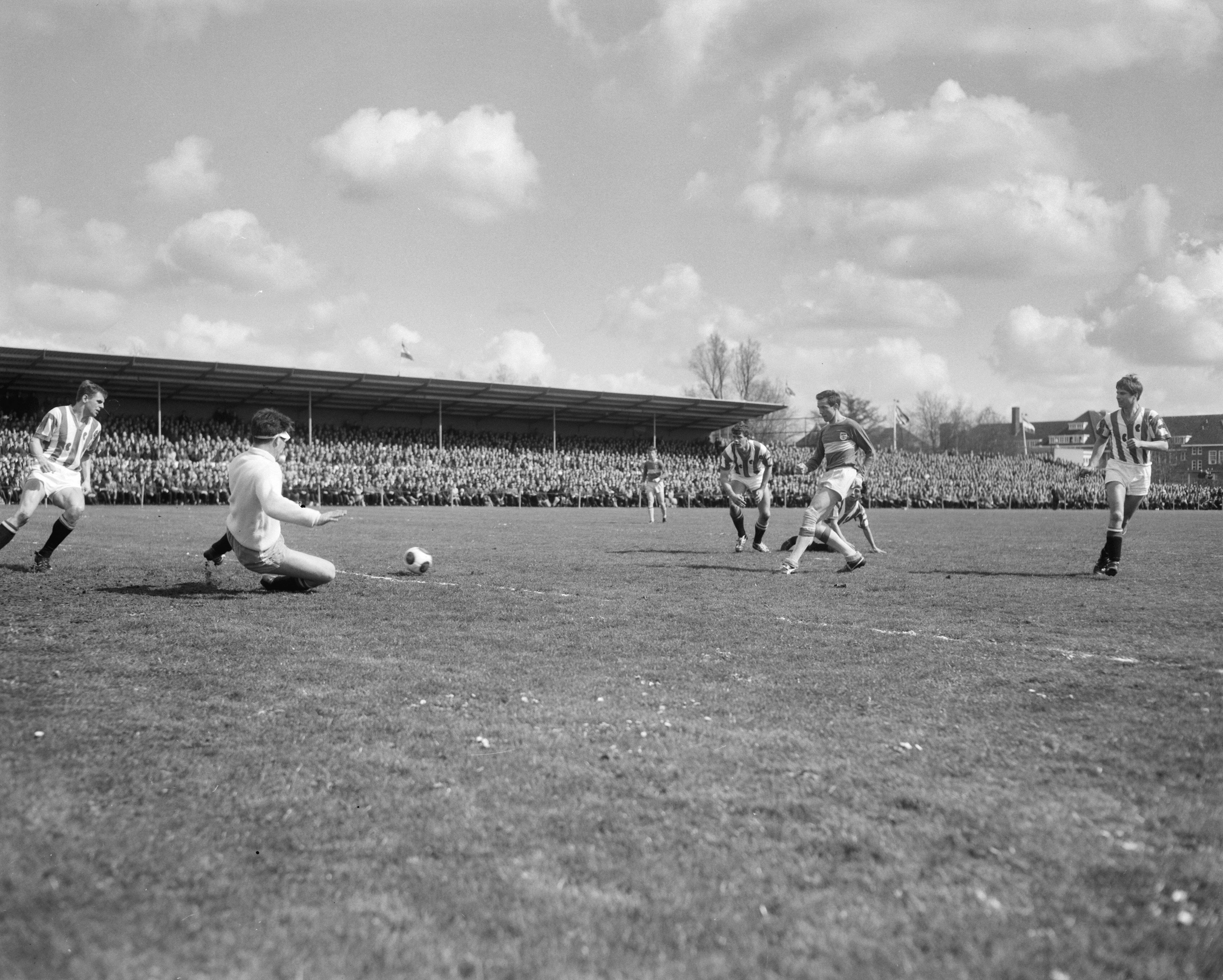
- Sportpark Noord in 1965
- Interactive map of Sportpark Noord
- Location: Heerenveen, Netherlands
- Capacity: 15,000 (peak)

Construction
- Groundbreaking: 1928
- Closed: 1994

Tenant
- SC Heerenveen

Sportpark Noord was a multi-use stadium in Heerenveen, Netherlands. It was used mostly for football matches and hosted the home matches of SC Heerenveen. The stadium was able to hold 15,000 spectators at its peak. It was closed in 1994 when the Abe Lenstra Stadion was opened.
