= Pierre Vermeulen =

Dutch footballer

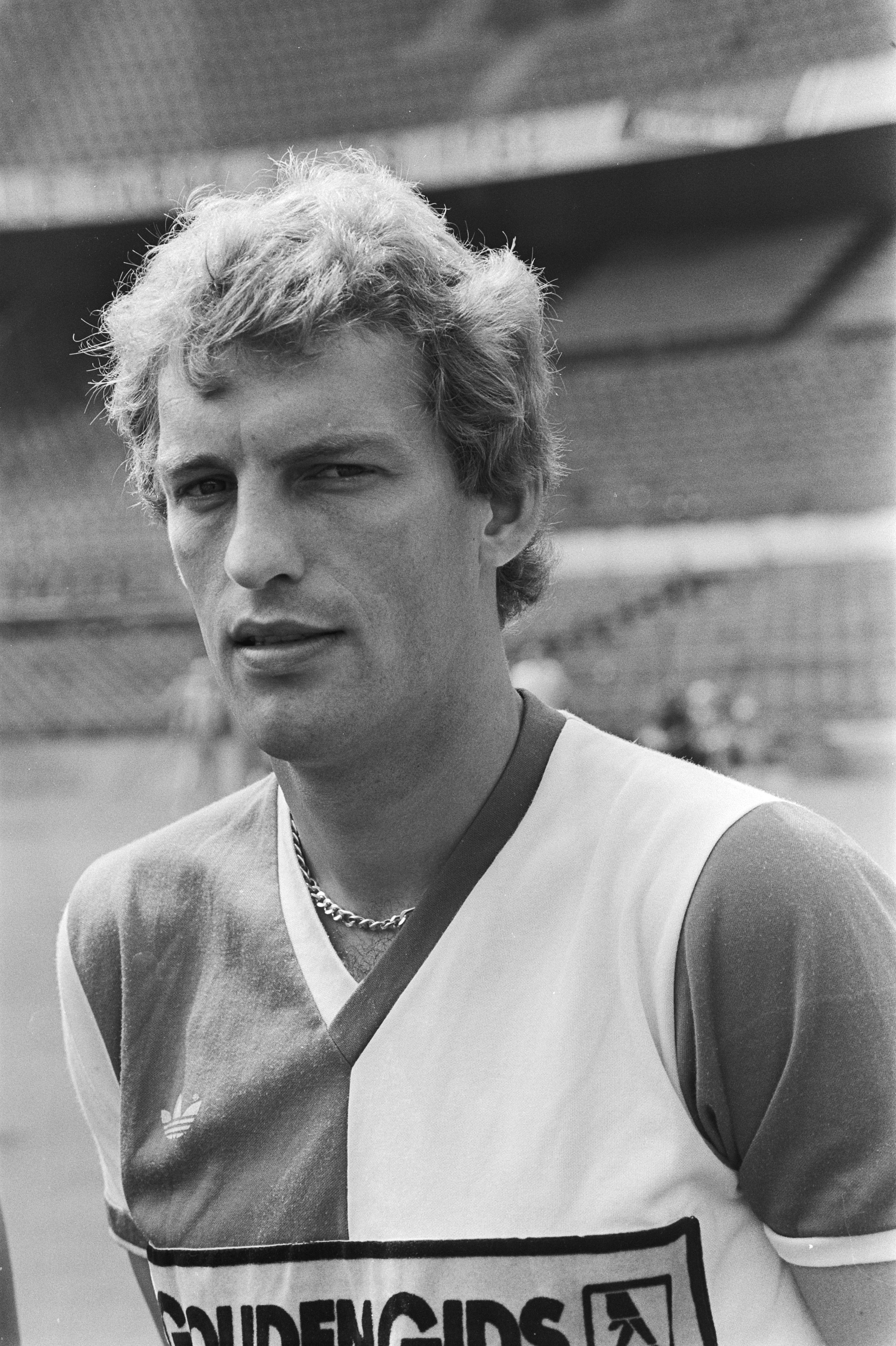

Personal information
- Full name: Pierre Vermeulen
- Date of birth: 16 March 1956 (age 70)
- Place of birth: Kerkrade, Netherlands
- Position: Forward

Youth career
- Roda JC

Senior career*
Years	Team	Apps	(Gls)
1974–1980	Roda JC	155	(47)
1980–1984	Feyenoord	104	(19)
1984–1985	MVV Maastricht	34	(5)
1985–1987	Paris Saint-Germain	45	(1)
1987–1989	Tours FC	46	(7)
1989–1991	Angers SCO	39	(0)

International career^{‡}
1978–1983	Netherlands	9	(1)
- * Club domestic league appearances and goals as of 9 June 2007 ‡ National team caps and goals as of 9 June 2007

Pierre Vermeulen (born 16 March 1956 in Kerkrade) is a Dutch footballer who was active as a forward. Vermeulen made his professional debut at Roda JC and also played for Feyenoord Rotterdam, MVV Maastricht, Paris Saint-Germain FC, Tours FC, and Angers SCO.

== Honours ==
- 1983-84 : Eredivisie winner with Feyenoord
- 1983-84 : KNVB Cup winner with Feyenoord
- 1985-86 : Ligue 1 winner with Paris Saint-Germain
