= André Stafleu =

Dutch footballer

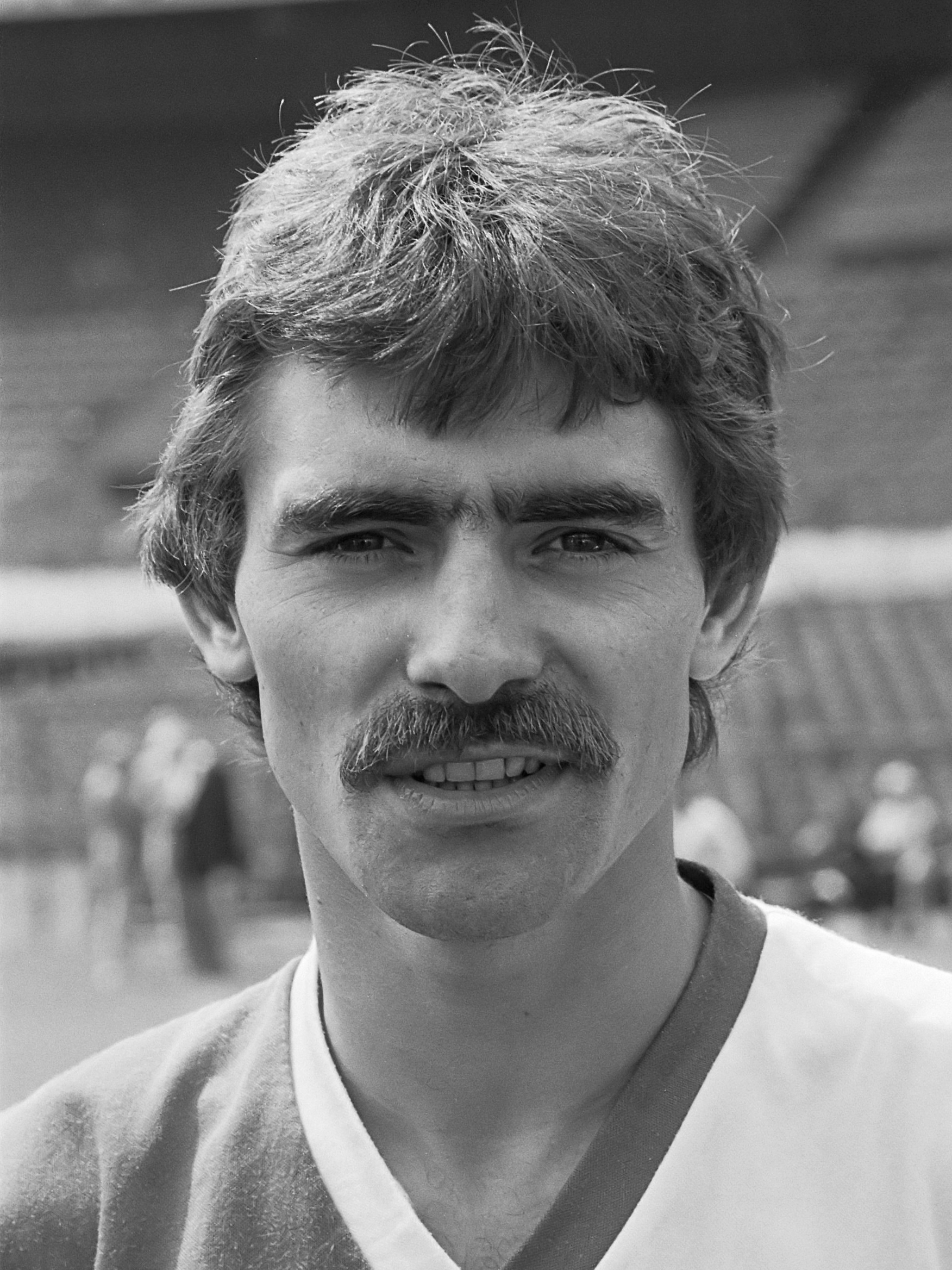

Personal information
- Full name: André Stafleu
- Date of birth: 21 February 1955 (age 71)
- Place of birth: Leidschendam, Netherlands
- Position: Defender

Youth career
- RKAVV Leidschendam
- Feyenoord

Senior career*
Years	Team	Apps	(Gls)
1975–1978	Feyenoord	1	(0)
1978–1978	Excelsior	13	(0)
1978–1985	Feyenoord	196	(8)
1985–1987	Vitesse Arnhem	54	(1)
1987–1988	Willem II	34	(0)
1988–1990	HFC Haarlem	59	(0)

International career
	Netherlands	0	(0)

Managerial career
- 1990–1991: HFC Haarlem (assistant)
- 1991–1992: FC Volendam (assistant)
- 1992–1993: FC Volendam
- 1998–2004: Feyenoord (youth coach)
- 2004–2007: Feyenoord
- 2007: Tianjin Teda (assistant)
- * Club domestic league appearances and goals

André Stafleu (born 21 February 1955 in Leidschendam) is a retired Dutch footballer who was active as a defender. Stafleu made his professional debut at Feyenoord and also played for Excelsior, Vitesse Arnhem, Willem II and HFC Haarlem. After his career he took control as a manager over FC Volendam and Sportclub Feyenoord (the amateur branch of Feyenoord), while he was a youth coach at Feyenoord for many years. He was assistant coach in Chinese Football Club Tianjin Teda in 2007.

== Honours ==
- 1979-80 : KNVB Cup winner with Feyenoord
- 1983-84 : Eredivisie winner with Feyenoord
- 1983-84 : KNVB Cup winner with Feyenoord
- First match: 7 June 1976 : Feyenoord - De Graafschap, 8-0
