= Wagenberg =

- Village
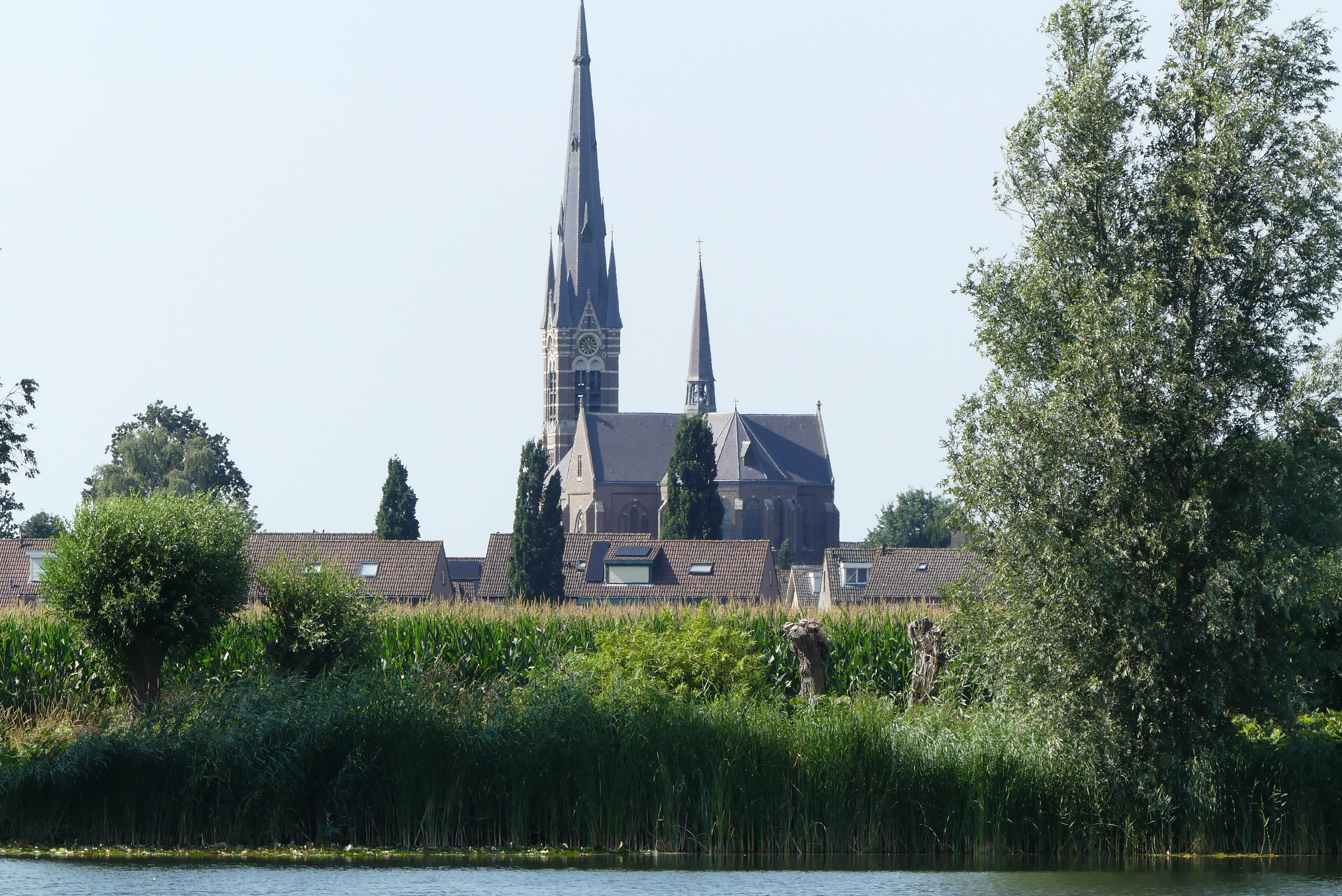
- St Gummarus Church

- Location in the province of North Brabant in the Netherlands Wagenberg (Netherlands)
- Coordinates: 51.6640°N 4.7461°E
- Country: Netherlands
- Province: North Brabant
- Municipality: Drimmelen

Area
  - Total: 5.36 km^{2} (2.07 sq mi)
- Elevation: 2.1 m (6.9 ft)

Population (2021)
  - Total: 2,180
  - Density: 407/km^{2} (1,050/sq mi)
- Time zone: UTC+1 (CET)
  - Summer (DST): UTC+2 (CEST)
- Postal code: 4844
- Dialing code: 076

Wagenberg is a village in the Dutch province of North Brabant. It is located in the municipality of Drimmelen. The village is located about 6 kilometres (3.7 mi) north of Breda.

== History ==
The village was first mentioned in 1331 as Wagenberghe, and means "hill of Wago (person)." Wagenberg developed to the north of Terheijden in the Middle Ages.

The Catholic St Gummarus Church is a three aisled basilica-like church in Gothic Revival style. It was built between 1903 and 1904 as a replacement of the 1796 church. It has a multi-coloured interior, and a 67 metres (220 ft) tall tower which is the same length as the church. In 1944, a bomb fell through the roof, but did not explode, and the damage could be repaired.

Wagenberg was home to 1,195 people in 1840. The village was damaged by war in October and November 1944 resulting in 21 deaths among the population. The village used to be part of the municipality of Terheijden. In 1997, it became part of the Drimmelen.

== Notable people ==
- Michel van de Korput (born 1956), former footballer

== Gallery ==
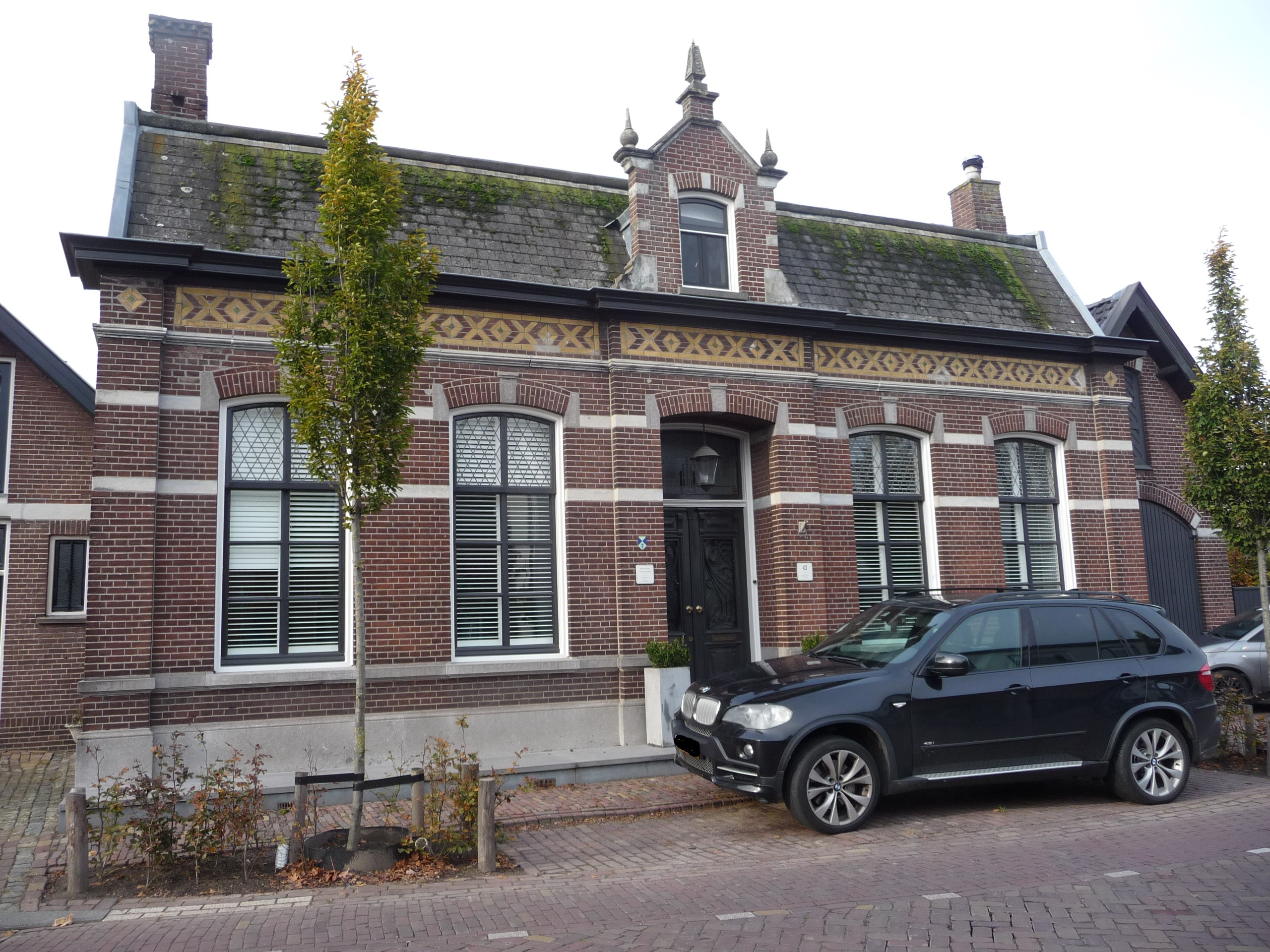
House in Wagenberg

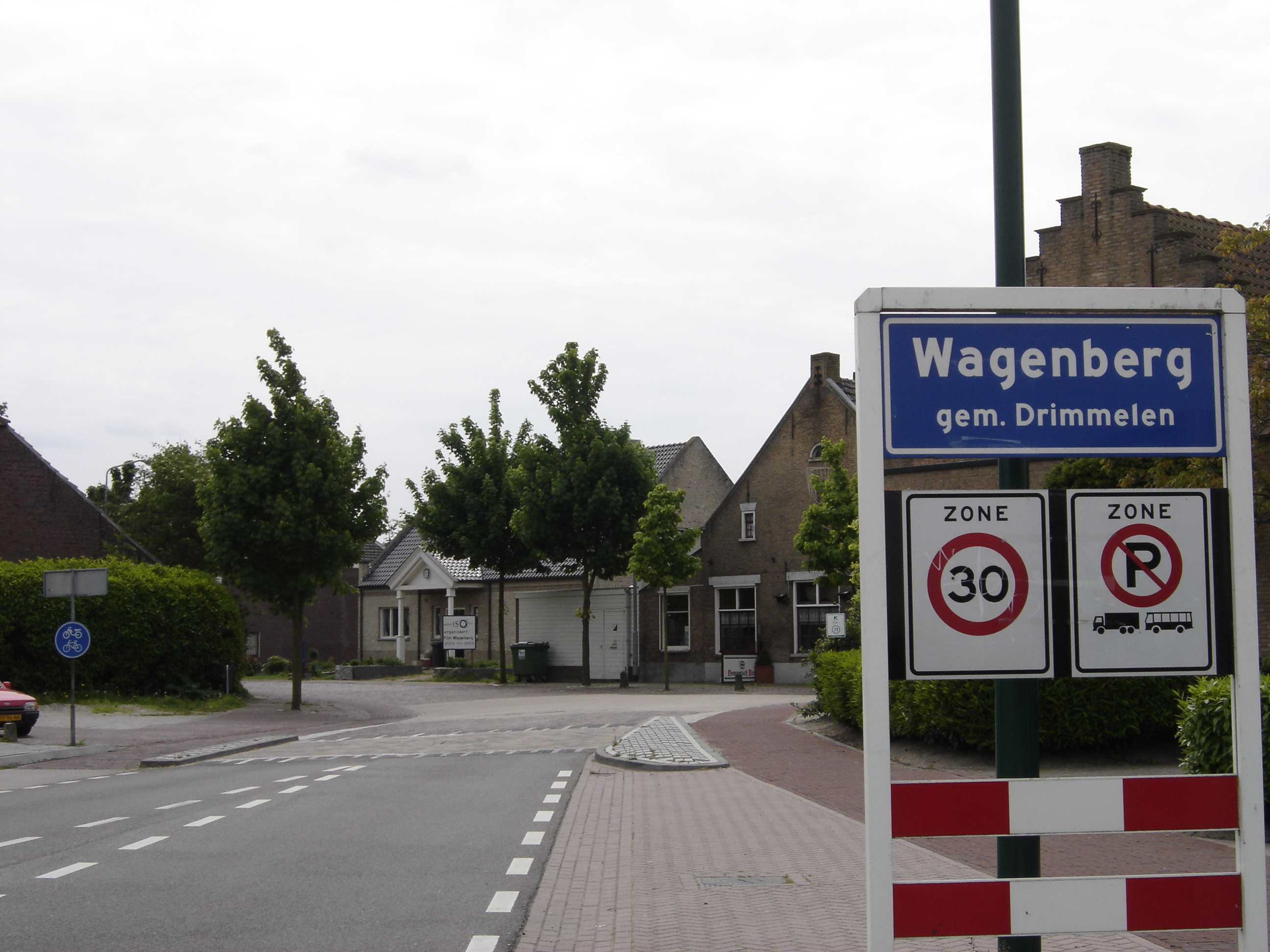
Welcome to Wagenberg

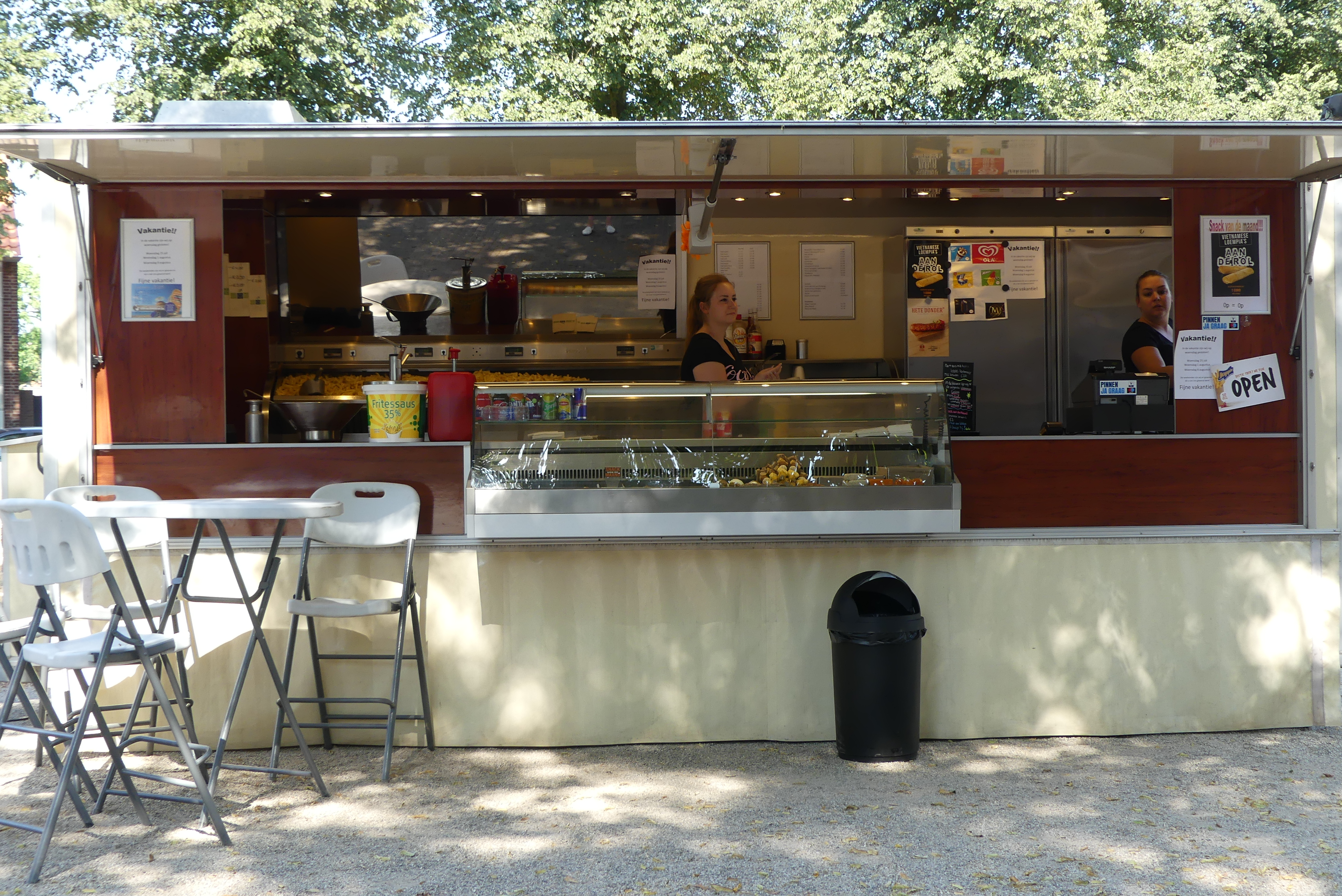
Snack bar

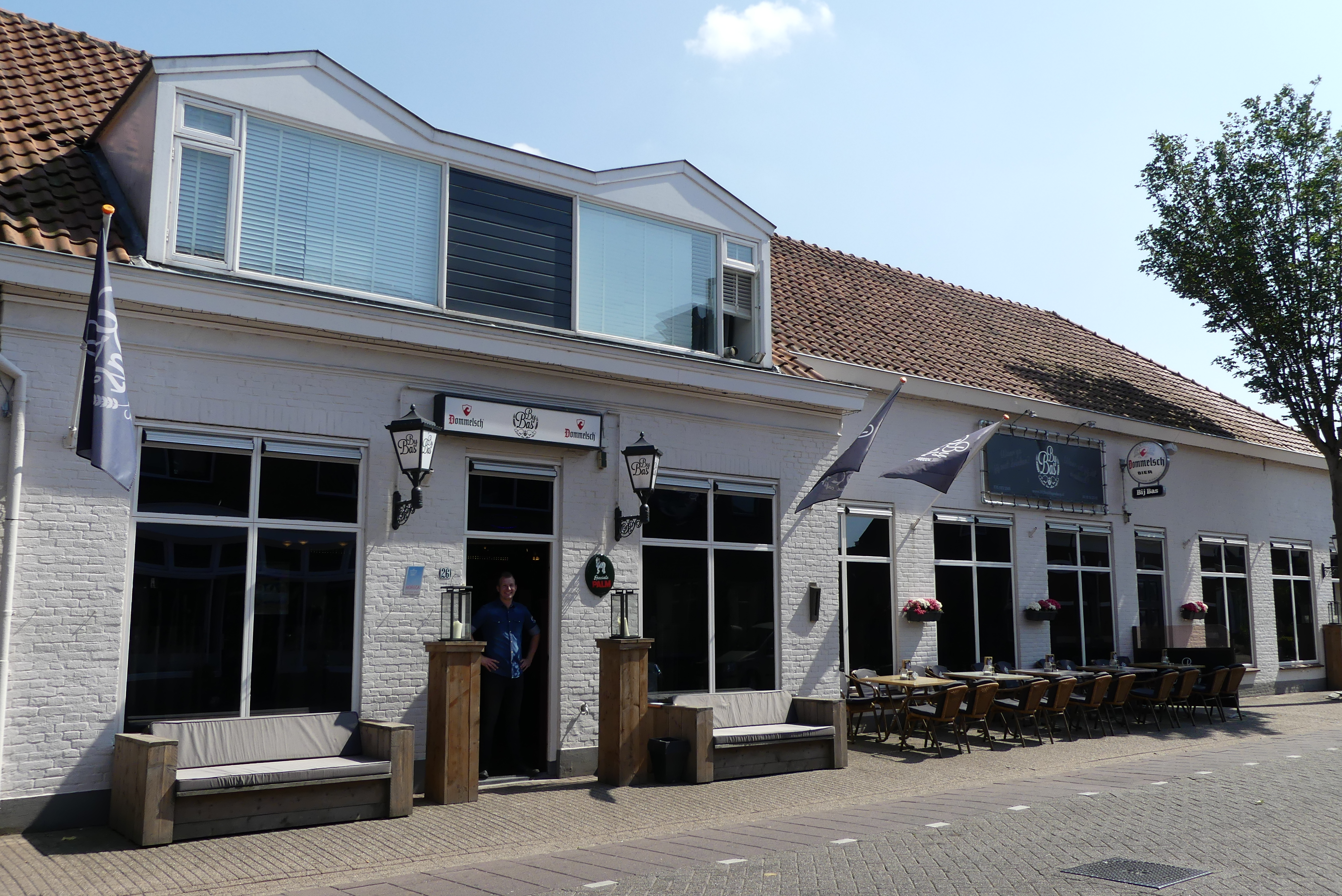
Pub in Wagenberg
