= Piet Keur =

Dutch footballer

Pieter Keur
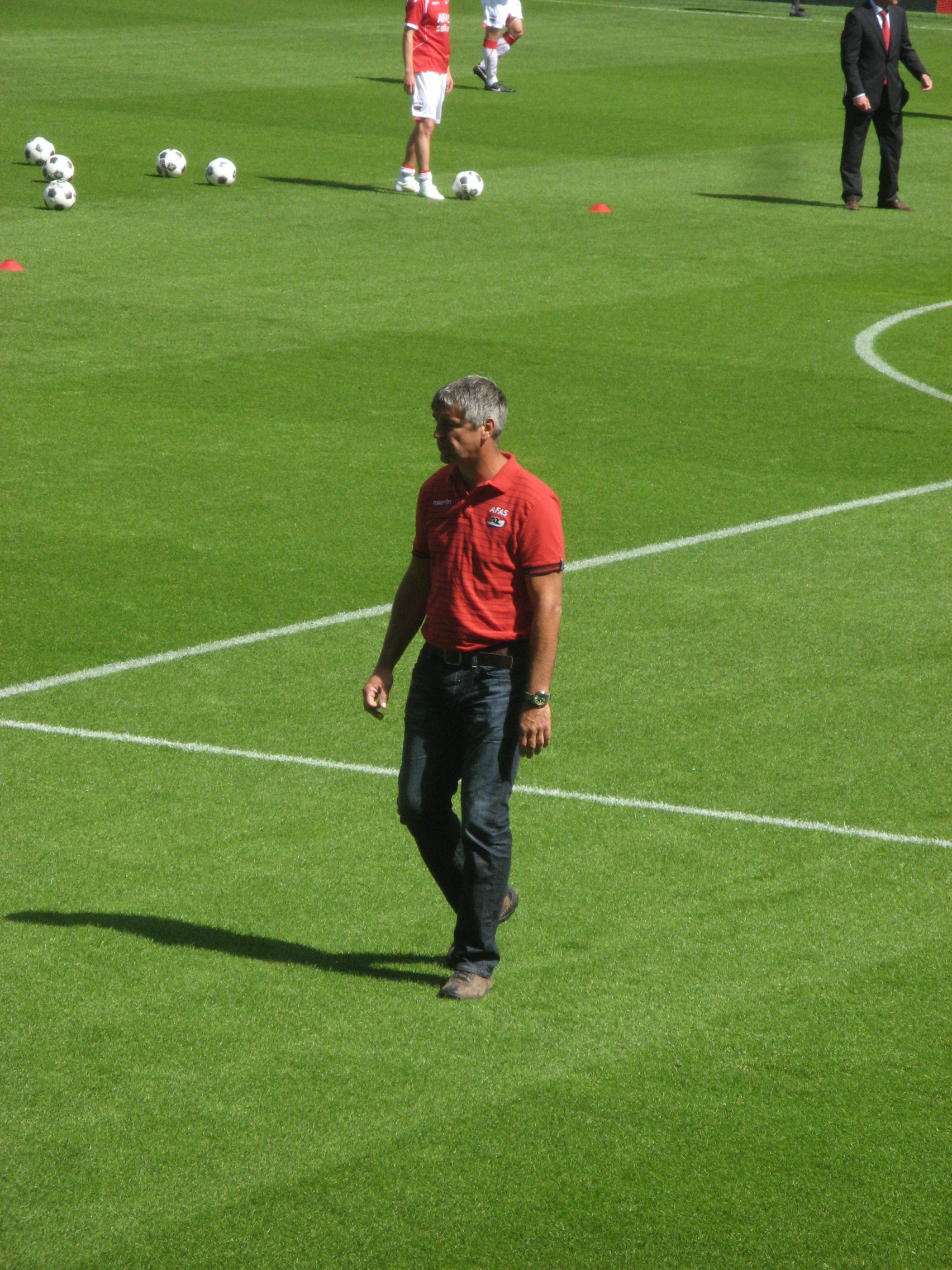

Personal information
- Full name: Pieter Keur
- Date of birth: 20 December 1960 (age 65)
- Place of birth: Zandvoort, Netherlands
- Position: Striker

Youth career
- Zandvoortmeeuwen

Senior career*
Years	Team	Apps	(Gls)
1981–1987	HFC Haarlem	165	(65)
1987–1989	FC Twente	60	(33)
1989–1991	Feyenoord Rotterdam	42	(15)
1991–1991	→ SVV (loan)	15	(4)
1991–1993	HFC Haarlem	54	(28)
1993–1995	SC Heerenveen	18	(8)
1995–1996	AZ	38	(15)
1996–1997	HFC Haarlem	16	(6)

International career
	Netherlands	0	(0)

Managerial career
- 1996–1999: AZ (staff member)
- 1999–2003: HBC Heemstede
- 2006–2007: Zandvoort SV
- * Club domestic league appearances and goals

Pieter "Piet" Keur (born 20 December 1960 in Zandvoort, North Holland) is a retired football striker from the Netherlands, who was a prolific goalscorer in the 1980s and early 1990s. He's currently striker-coach at AZ.

He played for HFC Haarlem (1981–1987), FC Twente (1987–1989), Feyenoord Rotterdam (1989–1990), SVV (1991), HFC Haarlem (1991–1993), SC Heerenveen (1993–1994) and AZ Alkmaar (1995–1996). He retired in 1996, playing for the club where he started his career, HFC Haarlem. Keur was a member of the famous Haarlem-team, that competed in the UEFA Cup in the 1982–83 season, for the first time in the club's history.
