= Henk Duut =

Dutch footballer (born 1964)

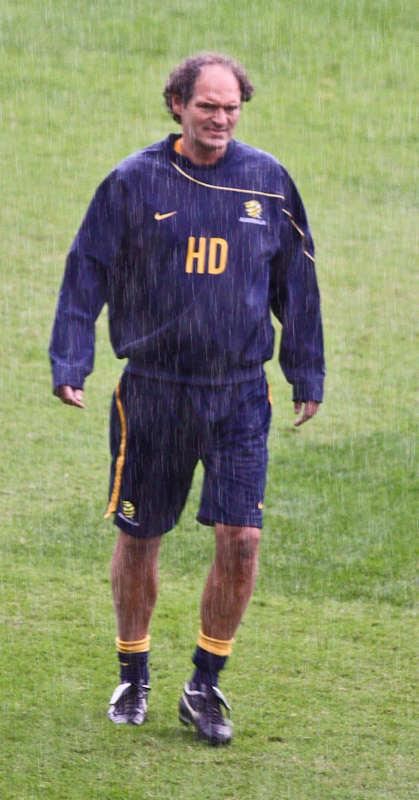

Personal information
- Full name: Henk Duut
- Date of birth: 14 January 1964 (age 62)
- Place of birth: Rotterdam, Netherlands
- Position: Defender

Youth career
- Transvalia ZW
- Feyenoord

Senior career*
Years	Team	Apps	(Gls)
1982–1986	Feyenoord	104	(20)
1985–1992	Fortuna Sittard	109	(18)
Total		213	(38)

International career
1982	Netherlands U19	4	(0)
1982-1985	Netherlands U21	4	(0)

Managerial career
- 1992–1996: Fortuna Sittard (youth coach)
- 1996–2000: Fortuna Sittard (assistant)
- 2000: Fortuna Sittard
- 2000–2002: Fortuna Sittard (youth coach)
- 2002: Omiya Ardija
- 2004: Netherlands Antilles (assistant)
- 2004–2007: Feyenoord (assistant)
- 2007–2010: Australia (assistant)
- 2010–2014: Morocco U-23 (assistant)
- 2016–2017: Guangzhou Evergrande (youth coach)
- 2018: Shijiazhuang Ever Bright (assistant)
- 2024-: Roda JC (academy)
- * Club domestic league appearances and goals

Henk Duut (born 14 January 1964 in Rotterdam) is a retired Dutch footballer who played as a defender. Currently, he works as a coach at the Guangzhou Evergrande youth academy.

== Playing career ==
=== Club ===
Duut started his football career at amateur side Transvalia ZW in his hometown Rotterdam before being scouted by Feyenoord. He made his professional debut on 13 March 1982 when Feyenoord won 1–2 in Eindhoven against PSV. For six seasons Duut was part of the Feyenoord squad and during the 1983–84 season he and his teammates won the double (Eredivisie and KNVB Cup). In December 1986, Feyenoord sent Duut on loan to Fortuna Sittard where he finished the season, after which Fortuna Sittard decided to sign Duut and he played another five years for the club based in Limburg. He suffered a stroke in 1990 but managed to return to Fortuna's senior squad, only to retire aged 28.

=== International ===
Duut played 4 games for the Netherlands national under-21 football team and was a member of the Dutch team at the 1983 FIFA World Youth Championship.

== Managerial career ==
On 29 April 1992, Duut was said to retire from professional football due to a cerebral hemorrhage. Earlier that year, on 7 February, he played his last match with Fortuna Sittard against MVV. Duut stayed at Fortuna Sittard and from the start of the following season (1992–93) he became a youth coach at the club, with which he stayed until 1996 to become Bert van Marwijk's assistant. Van Marwijk left Fortuna Sittard in 2000 to become the manager at Feyenoord and Duut took over as a manager. However, after 13 matches without a win he was taken out of his position. Again he became a youth coach at the club, until February 2002 when he joined the Japan-based Omiya Ardija as their manager for a season. He then became Pim Verbeek's assistant manager at the Netherlands Antilles national football team. In June 2004, he re-joined Feyenoord Rotterdam when the newly appointed manager, Ruud Gullit, asked him to become his assistant. After Gullit left, Duut remained in his position when his replacement Erwin Koeman arrived. On 11 December 2007, Duut was named as an assistant coach for the Australian national team, the Socceroos. He again worked under the newly appointed head coach, Verbeek.

On 8 April 2010, Duut followed Verbeek to Morocco to become coach of their Olympic squad. The team qualified for the Olympic Games in London 2012. He was dismissed in 2013 and left for China in 2016 to become coach of the U-19's at Guangzhou Evergrande. He later worked for Dewa United in Indonesia and Al-Markhiya in Qatar.

In 2024 Duut was named head coach of the Roda JC U21s, succeeding Edwin Linssen.

== Managerial statistics ==
Team	From	To	Record				
Team	From	To	G	W	D	L	Win %
Omiya Ardija	2002	2002	44	14	17	13	31.82
Total			44	14	17	13	31.82
