= Wim van Til =

Dutch footballer

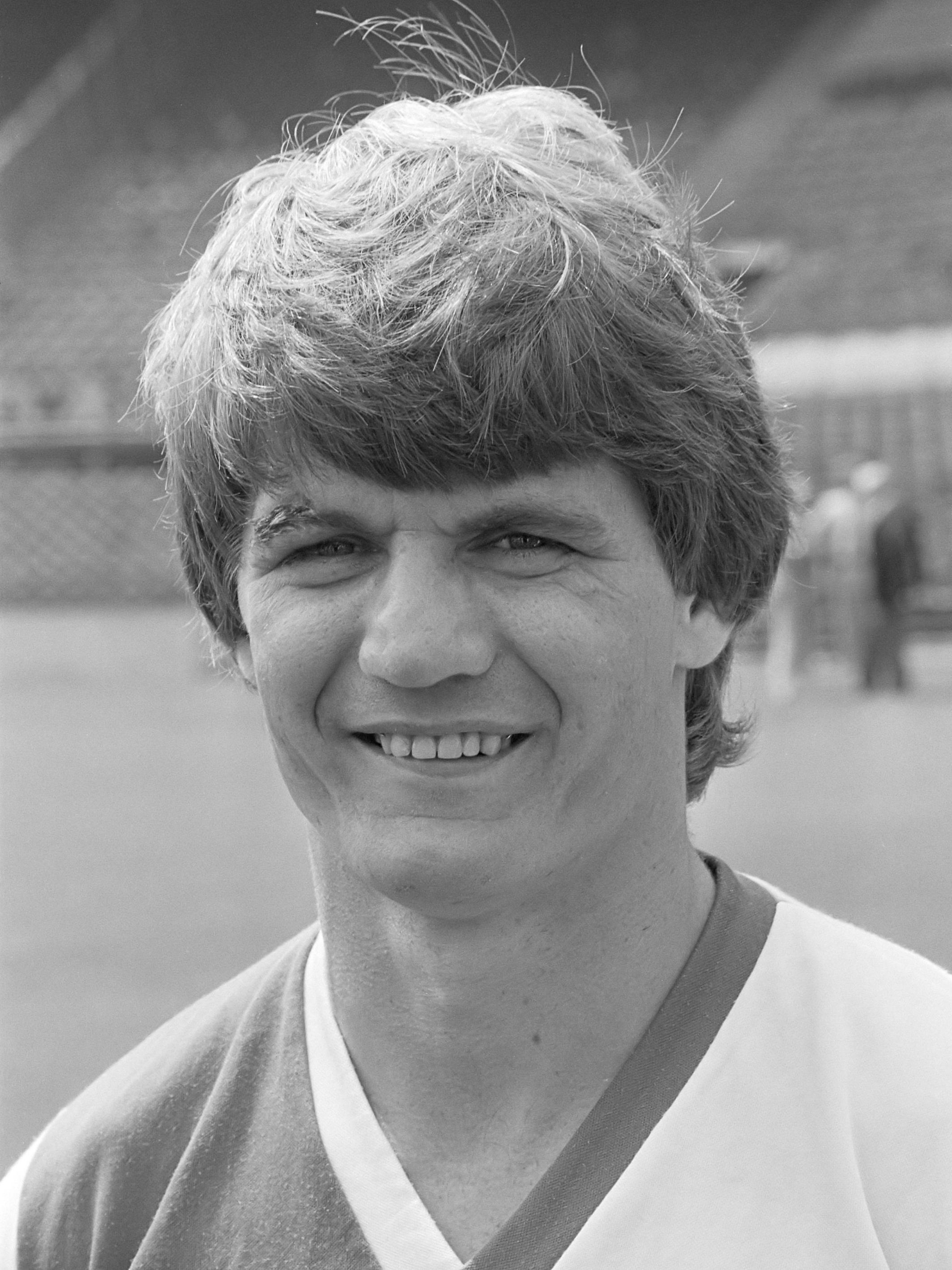

Personal information
- Full name: Wim van Til
- Date of birth: 24 September 1953 (age 73)
- Place of birth: Rotterdam, Netherlands
- Position: Midfielder

Youth career
- RVAV Overmaas
- Feijenoord

Senior career*
Years	Team	Apps	(Gls)
1973–1975	Feijenoord	6	(0)
1975–1976	FC Dordrecht	36	(2)
1976–1984	Feyenoord Rotterdam	122	(19)
1984–1985	Excelsior Rotterdam	29	(2)
1985–1986	Heracles Almelo	7	(1)

International career
	Netherlands	0	(0)

Managerial career
- 1986–1988: Feyenoord Rotterdam (youth coach)
- * Club domestic league appearances and goals

Wim van Til (born 24 September 1953) is a Dutch former footballer who was active as a midfielder. Van Til made his professional debut at Feijenoord and also played for FC Dordrecht, Excelsior Rotterdam and Heracles Almelo.

== Honours ==
- 1973–74 : Eredivisie winner with Feyenoord
- 1983–84 : Eredivisie winner with Feyenoord
- 1983–84 : KNVB Cup winner with Feyenoord
