= 1983–84 KNVB Cup =

Tournament details
- Country: Netherlands
- Teams: 64

Final positions
- Champions: Feyenoord
- Runners-up: Fortuna Sittard

The 1983-84 KNVB Cup was the 66th edition of the Dutch national football annual knockout tournament for the KNVB Cup. 46 teams contested, beginning on 8 October 1983 and ending at the final on 2 May 1984.

Feyenoord beat Fortuna Sittard 1–0 and won the cup for the sixth time. Replays were held if teams were tied after ninety minutes.

== Teams ==
- All 18 participants of the Eredivisie 1983-84
- All 17 participants of the Eerste Divisie 1983-84
- 29 teams from lower (amateur) leagues

== First round ==
The matches of the first round were played on 8-9 October 1983.

Home team	Result	Away team
sc Heerenveen _{1}	0–1	Feyenoord _{E}
Helmond Sport _{E}	0–0	HFC Haarlem _{E}
RVV HOV _{A}	0–5	Ajax _{E}
TSV Longa _{A}	1–4	PEC Zwolle _{E}
MVV _{1}	1–0	Vitesse Arnhem _{1}
NEC _{1}	2–0	Excelsior _{E}
VV Noordwijk _{A}	0–3	SC Heracles _{1}
Oranje Nassau _{A}	0–1	FC VVV _{1}
Quick Boys _{A}	1–0	SV AWC _{A}
ROHDA Raalte _{A}	2–11	Sparta _{E}
Rijnsburgse Boys _{A}	3–1	Willem II _{E}
SC Cambuur _{1}	2–2	PSV _{E}
SV Spakenburg _{A}	1–4	FC Groningen _{E}
TOP Oss _{A}	1–1	RBC _{1}
De Treffers _{A}	1–1	IJsselmeervogels _{A}
FC Wageningen _{1}	1–5	AZ'67 _{E}

Home team	Result	Away team
Achilles'29 _{A}	0–5	Go Ahead Eagles _{E}
ACV _{A}	0–7	Roda JC _{E}
BVV Barendrecht _{A}	0–2	XerxesDZB _{A}
SV Blerick _{A}	1–0	FC Eindhoven _{1}
VV Breskens _{A}	2–0	DWS _{A}
DESK _{A}	3–3	VV Caesar _{A}
DHC Delft _{A}	2–4	FC Den Haag _{1}
VV DOVO _{A}	2–4	Fortuna Sittard _{E}
VV Drachtster Boys _{A}	1–3	DS '79 _{E}
VV DWV _{A}	1–0	FC Den Bosch _{E}
USV Elinkwijk _{A}	1–0	SC Veendam _{1}
FC Emmen _{A}	3–0	AFC _{A}
FC Twente _{1}	4–0	Telstar _{1}
FC Utrecht _{E}	1–0	FC Volendam _{E}
VV Geldrop/AEK _{A}	1–5	NAC Breda _{1} (played at Breda)
De Graafschap _{1}	5–3	SVV _{1}

_{E} Eredivisie; _{1} Eerste Divisie; _{A} Amateur teams

=== Replays ===
Home team	Result	Away team
VV Caesar	1–0	DESK
HFC Haarlem	(p) 1-1	Helmond Sport
IJsselmeervogels	3–2	De Treffers
PSV	3–2	SC Cambuur
RBC	(p) 2-2	TOP Oss

== Second round ==
The matches of the second round were played on November 12 and 13, 1983.

Home team	Result	Away team
Fortuna Sittard	3–0	Go Ahead Eagles
De Graafschap	3–2	SC Heracles
IJsselmeervogels	1–5	DS '79
MVV	2–2	HFC Haarlem
NEC	0–0	Quick Boys
PSV	5–1	NAC Breda
Roda JC	1–0	Rijnsburgse Boys
Sparta	4–1	FC VVV

Home team	Result	Away team
AZ'67	6–1	FC Emmen
SV Blerick	2–1	PEC Zwolle
VV Breskens	2–2	VV Caesar
VV DWV	0–6	Ajax
FC Den Haag	4–0	XerxesDZB
FC Groningen	4–0	RBC
FC Twente	3–1	FC Utrecht
Feyenoord	7–0	USV Elinkwijk

=== Replays ===
Home team	Result	Away team
VV Caesar	1–0	VV Breskens
Quick Boys	2–4	NEC

== Round of 16 ==
The matches of the round of 16 were played during January, 1984.

Home team	Result	Away team
Ajax	2–2	Feyenoord
SV Blerick	1–6	AZ'67
FC Den Haag	1–5	FC Twente
FC Groningen	1–0	Sparta
De Graafschap	0–1	HFC Haarlem
NEC	1–1	DS '79
PSV	5–0	VV Caesar
Roda JC	1–2	Fortuna Sittard

=== Replays ===
Home team	Result	Away team
DS '79	0–2	NEC
Feyenoord	2–1 (aet)	Ajax

== Quarter finals ==
The quarter finals were played between February 29 and March 4, 1984.

Home team	Result	Away team
FC Groningen	2–2	FC Twente
Feyenoord	6–1	NEC
Fortuna Sittard	5–0	AZ'67
HFC Haarlem	4–1	PSV

=== Replay ===
Home team	Result	Away team
FC Twente	1–1 (p)	FC Groningen

== Semi-finals ==
The semi-finals were played on March 28, 1984.

Home team	Result	Away team
Feyenoord	1–1	HFC Haarlem
Fortuna Sittard	2–0	FC Groningen

=== Replay ===
Home team	Result	Away team
HFC Haarlem	1–4	Feyenoord

== Final ==
2 May 1984

Feyenoord	1–0	Fortuna Sittard
Houtman 72'

De Kuip, Rotterdam
Attendance: 40,000
Referee: Bep Thomas

Feyenoord also won the Dutch Eredivisie championship, thereby taking the double. They would participate in the European Cup, so finalists Fortuna Sittard could play in the Cup Winners' Cup.
