= 1983–84 Eredivisie =

28th season of the Eredivisie

Eredivisie
- Season: 1983–84
- Champions: Feyenoord (12th title)
- Promoted: FC Den Bosch; FC Volendam; DS '79
- Relegated: Helmond Sport; Willem II; DS '79
- European Cup: Feyenoord
- Cup Winners' Cup: Fortuna Sittard
- UEFA Cup: PSV Eindhoven; AFC Ajax
- Matches: 306
- Goals: 1,079 (3.53 per match)
- Average goals/game: 3.52
- Top goalscorer: (Netherlands) Marco van Basten; AFC Ajax 28 goals

The Dutch Eredivisie in the 1983–84 season was contested by 18 teams. Feyenoord won the championship.

== League standings ==
| Pos | Team | Pld | W | D | L | GF | GA | GD | Pts | Qualification or relegation |
|---|---|---|---|---|---|---|---|---|---|---|
| 1 | Feyenoord | 34 | 25 | 7 | 2 | 96 | 31 | +65 | 57 | Qualified for 1984–85 European Cup |
| 2 | PSV | 34 | 23 | 6 | 5 | 88 | 32 | +56 | 52 | Qualified for 1984–85 UEFA Cup |
| 3 | Ajax | 34 | 22 | 7 | 5 | 100 | 46 | +54 | 51 | Qualified for 1984–85 UEFA Cup |
| 4 | Haarlem | 34 | 14 | 13 | 7 | 59 | 50 | +9 | 41 | |
| 5 | Sparta | 34 | 12 | 13 | 9 | 77 | 63 | +14 | 37 | |
| 6 | AZ '67 | 34 | 14 | 9 | 11 | 64 | 50 | +14 | 37 | |
| 7 | FC Groningen | 34 | 14 | 9 | 11 | 64 | 51 | +13 | 37 | |
| 8 | FC Utrecht | 34 | 14 | 8 | 12 | 64 | 74 | −10 | 36 | |
| 9 | Roda JC | 34 | 13 | 9 | 12 | 55 | 55 | 0 | 35 | |
| 10 | FC Den Bosch | 34 | 11 | 11 | 12 | 48 | 55 | −7 | 33 | |
| 11 | Go Ahead Eagles | 34 | 12 | 8 | 14 | 52 | 63 | −11 | 32 | |
| 12 | Fortuna Sittard | 34 | 11 | 9 | 14 | 50 | 55 | −5 | 31 | Qualified for 1984–85 European Cup Winners' Cup (Note: Feyenoord also won the KNVB Cup, thereby taking the double. They would participate in the European Cup, so finalists Fortuna Sittard Would play in the Cup Winners' Cup.) |
| 13 | Excelsior | 34 | 13 | 5 | 16 | 56 | 62 | −6 | 31 | |
| 14 | PEC Zwolle | 34 | 10 | 9 | 15 | 56 | 70 | −14 | 29 | |
| 15 | FC Volendam | 34 | 9 | 8 | 17 | 39 | 68 | −29 | 26 | |
| 16 | Helmond Sport | 34 | 4 | 8 | 22 | 49 | 92 | −43 | 16 | Relegated to Eerste Divisie |
| 17 | Willem II | 34 | 5 | 6 | 23 | 27 | 74 | −47 | 16 | Relegated to Eerste Divisie |
| 18 | DS '79 | 34 | 6 | 3 | 25 | 35 | 88 | −53 | 15 | Relegated to Eerste Divisie |

Source: rsssf.com

== Results ==
| Home \ Away | AJA | AZ | DBO | DS | EXC | FEY | FSI | GAE | GRO | HFC | HSP | PEC | PSV | RJC | SPA | UTR | VOL | WIL |
|---|---|---|---|---|---|---|---|---|---|---|---|---|---|---|---|---|---|---|
| Ajax | | 2–1 | 5–2 | 7–2 | 4–0 | 8–2 | 5–1 | 3–1 | 1–1 | 0–3 | 7–2 | 4–2 | 1–0 | 5–2 | 4–0 | 5–2 | 5–0 | 5–0 |
| AZ '67 | 1–1 | | 1–1 | 2–0 | 2–1 | 0–1 | 2–0 | 2–2 | 0–0 | 4–4 | 3–1 | 1–2 | 3–0 | 2–0 | 0–1 | 0–1 | 3–1 | 4–0 |
| FC Den Bosch '67 | 3–0 | 2–4 | | 2–0 | 2–0 | 1–1 | 2–1 | 0–0 | 0–0 | 0–2 | 3–0 | 3–1 | 2–4 | 1–1 | 2–2 | 3–0 | 1–2 | 2–0 |
| DS '79 | 1–2 | 0–2 | 1–3 | | 0–2 | 0–3 | 2–0 | 2–2 | 1–5 | 0–4 | 0–4 | 4–1 | 1–5 | 1–2 | 1–4 | 0–1 | 2–0 | 0–1 |
| Excelsior | 1–1 | 0–2 | 3–1 | 0–1 | | 0–2 | 6–0 | 2–1 | 3–0 | 0–0 | 1–4 | 4–1 | 0–3 | 1–2 | 2–1 | 7–4 | 4–2 | 0–1 |
| Feyenoord | 4–1 | 5–2 | 1–1 | 2–1 | 4–0 | | 5–2 | 2–0 | 2–0 | 7–2 | 5–2 | 2–1 | 1–1 | 5–2 | 0–0 | 3–0 | 2–0 | 4–0 |
| Fortuna Sittard | 1–2 | 0–0 | 5–1 | 4–1 | 2–0 | 0–4 | | 1–2 | 0–0 | 2–0 | 2–0 | 1–1 | 1–2 | 1–1 | 1–0 | 2–0 | 5–2 | 7–0 |
| Go Ahead Eagles | 1–3 | 1–4 | 0–1 | 2–1 | 4–1 | 1–1 | 3–2 | | 2–2 | 1–3 | 2–1 | 2–0 | 2–1 | 1–2 | 5–3 | 2–0 | 4–0 | 4–6 |
| FC Groningen | 1–5 | 6–2 | 1–1 | 1–1 | 0–2 | 1–0 | 3–0 | 2–0 | | 1–2 | 5–3 | 1–1 | 1–4 | 4–1 | 4–0 | 3–1 | 4–1 | 2–0 |
| FC Haarlem | 3–3 | 2–2 | 1–1 | 2–2 | 2–2 | 0–1 | 1–0 | 3–1 | 2–1 | | 3–0 | 2–1 | 0–0 | 0–0 | 2–2 | 5–1 | 1–1 | 2–0 |
| Helmond Sport | 0–2 | 5–3 | 1–3 | 2–4 | 1–2 | 0–5 | 1–1 | 0–1 | 0–0 | 0–0 | | 2–6 | 1–5 | 3–2 | 2–3 | 2–2 | 1–2 | 2–2 |
| PEC Zwolle '82 | 1–1 | 2–1 | 1–1 | 3–2 | 2–0 | 2–2 | 1–3 | 1–1 | 0–2 | 3–0 | 2–1 | | 1–3 | 1–2 | 1–1 | 1–2 | 1–1 | 3–1 |
| PSV | 1–0 | 1–0 | 6–1 | 5–0 | 0–0 | 1–1 | 5–1 | 7–1 | 3–1 | 6–0 | 5–0 | 4–2 | | 2–0 | 1–0 | 3–3 | 3–1 | 1–2 |
| Roda JC | 1–1 | 1–2 | 4–0 | 2–1 | 2–0 | 0–4 | 1–2 | 1–1 | 2–3 | 0–1 | 2–1 | 7–3 | 1–2 | | 2–2 | 1–1 | 3–0 | 1–0 |
| Sparta Rotterdam | 5–2 | 1–1 | 2–1 | 8–1 | 3–3 | 1–4 | 1–1 | 4–0 | 3–2 | 3–4 | 3–3 | 2–2 | 2–2 | 2–2 | | 6–1 | 3–0 | 3–1 |
| FC Utrecht | 1–1 | 1–7 | 3–0 | 3–1 | 7–4 | 0–2 | 0–0 | 2–0 | 3–2 | 2–1 | 6–4 | 6–2 | 2–0 | 0–2 | 2–2 | | 2–2 | 2–0 |
| FC Volendam | 0–2 | 4–0 | 1–1 | 2–0 | 1–3 | 1–4 | 1–1 | 0–2 | 2–1 | 1–0 | 0–0 | 0–2 | 0–1 | 1–1 | 3–2 | 1–1 | | 3–2 |
| Willem II | 0–2 | 1–1 | 1–0 | 0–1 | 0–2 | 0–5 | 0–0 | 0–0 | 3–4 | 2–2 | 0–0 | 1–2 | 0–1 | 1–2 | 1–2 | 0–2 | 1–3 | |

Legend: Blue = home team win; Yellow = draw; Red = away team win.

== Attendances ==
| No. | Club | Average | Change | Highest |
|---|---|---|---|---|
| 1 | Feyenoord | 25,696 | 11,0% | 57,000 |
| 2 | PSV | 16,059 | -4,0% | 28,000 |
| 3 | FC Groningen | 12,496 | -1,4% | 17,000 |
| 4 | AFC Ajax | 12,376 | -28,4% | 40,000 |
| 5 | FC Utrecht | 8,647 | -8,1% | 19,500 |
| 6 | Fortuna Sittard | 8,018 | -26,5% | 15,000 |
| 7 | FC Den Bosch | 7,199 | 127,2% | 25,000 |
| 8 | PEC Zwolle | 7,176 | 10,9% | 15,000 |
| 9 | Go Ahead Eagles | 6,882 | -3,3% | 16,000 |
| 10 | Roda JC | 6,853 | -28,7% | 16,500 |
| 11 | Willem II | 6,124 | -9,9% | 12,500 |
| 12 | FC Volendam | 5,676 | 29,7% | 17,000 |
| 13 | Sparta | 5,412 | -28,1% | 20,000 |
| 14 | Helmond Sport | 5,265 | -25,4% | 9,000 |
| 15 | Excelsior | 4,609 | -36,6% | 19,500 |
| 16 | HFC Haarlem | 4,329 | -16,6% | 12,500 |
| 17 | AZ '67 | 4,186 | -32,3% | 10,350 |
| 18 | DS '79 | 3,635 | -13,9% | 8,500 |

== See also ==
- 1983–84 Eerste Divisie
- 1983–84 KNVB Cup
