= Belgium at the UEFA European Championship =

International football delegation

The UEFA European Championship is the main football competition of the men's national football teams governed by UEFA (the Union of European Football Associations). Held every four years since 1960, in the even-numbered year between World Cup tournaments, it was originally called the UEFA European Nations Cup, changing to the current name in 1968. Starting with the 1996 tournament, specific championships are often referred to in the form "Euro 2008" or whichever year is appropriate. Prior to entering the tournament, all teams other than the host nations (which qualify automatically) compete in a qualifying process.

Belgium have participated in seven UEFA European Championships finals, those held in 1972, 1980, 1984, 2000, 2016, 2020 (which was postponed to 2021 due to the COVID-19 pandemic) and 2024. As of 1 July 2024, they have played 26 matches: twelve wins, three draws and eleven losses.

== Overview ==
=== Overall record ===
Champions Runners-up Third place

Line-ups for the UEFA Euro 1980 final in which Belgium (red) faced the 1976 runners-up West Germany (white). The respective coaches were Guy Thys and Jupp Derwall.

UEFA European Championship record											Qualification record						
Year	Host(s)	Round	Position	Pld	W	D	L	GF	GA	Squad	Pos.	Pld	W	D	L	GF	GA
1960	France	Did not enter									Did not enter						
1964	Spain	Did not qualify									Preliminary round	2	0	0	2	2	4
1968	Italy	Did not qualify									2nd	6	3	1	2	14	9
1972	Belgium	Third place	3rd	2	1	0	1	3	3	Squad	Quarter-finals	8	5	2	1	13	4
1976	Yugoslavia	Did not qualify									Quarter-finals	8	3	2	3	7	10
1980	Italy	Runners-up	2nd	4	1	2	1	4	4	Squad	1st	8	4	4	0	12	5
1984	France	Group stage	6th	3	1	0	2	4	8	Squad	1st	6	4	1	1	12	8
1988	West Germany	Did not qualify									3rd	8	3	3	2	16	8
1992	Sweden	Did not qualify									3rd	6	2	1	3	7	6
1996	England	Did not qualify									3rd	10	4	3	3	17	13
2000	Belgium; Netherlands	Group stage	12th	3	1	0	2	2	5	Squad	Qualified as co-hosts						
2004	Portugal	Did not qualify									3rd	8	5	1	2	11	9
2008	Austria; Switzerland	Did not qualify									5th	14	5	3	6	14	16
2012	Poland; Ukraine	Did not qualify									3rd	10	4	3	3	21	15
2016	France	Quarter-finals	6th	5	3	0	2	9	5	Squad	1st	10	7	2	1	24	5
2020	Europe	Quarter-finals	5th	5	4	0	1	9	3	Squad	1st	10	10	0	0	40	3
2024	Germany	Round of 16	10th	4	1	1	2	2	2	Squad	1st	8	6	2	0	22	4
2028	United Kingdom; Ireland	To be determined									To be determined						
2032	Italy; Turkey	To be determined									To be determined						
Total		Runners-up	7/17	26	12	3	11	33	30	—	7/17	122	65	28	29	232	119
Champions Runners-up Third place

=== List of matches ===
List of UEFA European Championship matches
Year	Round	Opponent	Score	Result
1972	Semi-finals	West Germany	1–2	Loss
1972	Third place match	Hungary	2–1	Win
1980	Group stage	England	1–1	Draw
1980	Group stage	Spain	2–1	Win
1980	Group stage	Italy	0–0	Draw
1980	Final	West Germany	1–2	Loss
1984	Group stage	Yugoslavia	2–0	Win
1984	Group stage	France	0–5	Loss
1984	Group stage	Denmark	2–3	Loss
2000	Group stage	Sweden	2–1	Win
2000	Group stage	Italy	0–2	Loss
2000	Group stage	Turkey	0–2	Loss
2016	Group stage	Italy	0–2	Loss
2016	Group stage	Republic of Ireland	3–0	Win
2016	Group stage	Sweden	1–0	Win
2016	Round of 16	Hungary	4–0	Win
2016	Quarter-finals	Wales	1–3	Loss
2020	Group stage	Russia	3–0	Win
2020	Group stage	Denmark	2–1	Win
2020	Group stage	Finland	2–0	Win
2020	Round of 16	Portugal	1–0	Win
2020	Quarter-finals	Italy	1–2	Loss
2024	Group stage	Slovakia	0–1	Loss
2024	Group stage	Romania	2–0	Win
2024	Group stage	Ukraine	0–0	Draw
2024	Round of 16	France	0–1	Loss

== Euro 1972 ==
Belgium hosted the European Championship twice, as they were chosen amongst the four semi-finalists to host the event, and ended third by beating Hungary.

=== Final tournament ===
Semi-finals

14 June 1972
20:00

Belgium	1–2	West Germany
Polleunis 83'	Report	Müller 24', 71'

Bosuilstadion, Antwerp
Attendance: 55,669
Referee: William Mullan (Scotland)

Third place play-off

17 June 1972
20:00

Hungary	1–2	Belgium
Kű 53' (pen.)	Report	Lambert 24'; Van Himst 28'

Stade Maurice Dufrasne, Liège
Attendance: 6,184
Referee: Johan Einar Boström (Sweden)

== Euro 1980 ==
Under the guidance of manager Guy Thys, Belgium achieved their best European result at the 1980 edition in Italy. After finishing first in the group phase, before football nations Italy, England and Spain, Belgium stood in the final against West Germany. After the German opener from Horst Hrubesch and the penalty equalizer from René Vandereycken, the match seemed to go in extra time. Two minutes before the end of the regular playing time, Hrubesch's second goal ended the Belgian dream of winning a first major (non-Olympic) tournament.

=== Group stage ===
Pos	Team	Pld	W	D	L	GF	GA	GD	Pts	Qualification
1	Belgium	3	1	2	0	3	2	+1	4	Advance to final
2	Italy (H)	3	1	2	0	1	0	+1	4	Advance to third place play-off
3	England	3	1	1	1	3	3	0	3	
4	Spain	3	0	1	2	2	4	−2	1	

Source: UEFA
Rules for classification: Group stage tiebreakers
(H) Hosts
12 June 1980
17:45

Belgium	1–1	England
Ceulemans 29'	Report	Wilkins 26'

Stadio Comunale, Turin
Attendance: 15,186
Referee: Heinz Aldinger (West Germany)

15 June 1980
17:45

Belgium	2–1	Spain
Gerets 17'; Cools 65'	Report	Quini 36'

San Siro, Milan
Attendance: 11,430
Referee: Charles Corver (Netherlands)

18 June 1980
20:30

Italy	0–0	Belgium
	Report

Stadio Olimpico, Rome
Attendance: 42,318
Referee: António Garrido (Portugal)

=== Knockout stage ===
Final

22 June 1980
20:30

Belgium	1–2	West Germany
Vandereycken 75' (pen.)	Report	Hrubesch 10', 88'

Stadio Olimpico, Rome
Attendance: 47,860
Referee: Nicolae Rainea (Romania)

== Euro 1984 ==
At UEFA Euro 1984 the road to the knockout stage seemed open after taking a 2–0 lead in their last group match against Denmark, but the Red Devils could not prevent Danish Dynamite to turn the tide in their favour.

=== Group stage ===
Pos	Team	Pld	W	D	L	GF	GA	GD	Pts	Qualification
1	France (H)	3	3	0	0	9	2	+7	6	Advance to knockout stage
2	Denmark	3	2	0	1	8	3	+5	4	Advance to knockout stage
3	Belgium	3	1	0	2	4	8	−4	2	
4	Yugoslavia	3	0	0	3	2	10	−8	0	

Source: UEFA
Rules for classification: Group stage tiebreakers
(H) Hosts
13 June 1984
20:30

Belgium	2–0	Yugoslavia
Vandenbergh 28'; Grün 45'	Report

Stade Félix-Bollaert, Lens
Attendance: 41,525
Referee: Erik Fredriksson (Sweden)

16 June 1984
17:15

France	5–0	Belgium
Platini 4', 74' (pen.), 89'; Giresse 33'; Fernández 43'	Report

Stade de la Beaujoire, Nantes
Attendance: 51,359
Referee: Bob Valentine (Scotland)

19 June 1984
20:30

Denmark	3–2	Belgium
Arnesen 41' (pen.); Brylle 60'; Elkjær 84'	Report	Ceulemans 26'; Vercauteren 39'

Stade de la Meinau, Strasbourg
Attendance: 36,911
Referee: Adolf Prokop (East Germany)

== Euro 2000 ==
The Belgian team was one of the major disappointments of the 2000 edition with a first-round exit. This early exit was fairly unexpected since during the eight preparational friendlies for Euro 2000 under Robert Waseige Belgium played well, winning three times convincingly and losing only once (2–1 against England). At Euro 2000, Belgium first won against Sweden 2–1 via goals from Bart Goor in the 43rd minute and Émile Mpenza in the 46th minute against Sweden's one by Johan Mjallby in the 53rd minute after a terrible error of goalkeeper Filip De Wilde. In the second match, Belgium lost 2–0 against the eventual tournament runners-up Italy by a header from Francesco Totti in the fifth minute and Stefano Fiore's goal of the tournament (according to the United Kingdom's Match of the Day television programme) in the 66th minute. In the crucial match where Belgium needed one more point to move ahead to the quarter-finals, they lost 2–0 against Turkey (two goals from Hakan Şükür in the 45th after another error of goalkeeper Filip De Wilde, and 70th minute). In the 83rd minute of that last group match, De Wilde even ended his tournament, being sent off for attacking Arif Erdem outside the penalty area.

=== Group stage ===
Pos	Team	Pld	W	D	L	GF	GA	GD	Pts	Qualification
1	Italy	3	3	0	0	6	2	+4	9	Advance to knockout stage
2	Turkey	3	1	1	1	3	2	+1	4	Advance to knockout stage
3	Belgium (H)	3	1	0	2	2	5	−3	3	
4	Sweden	3	0	1	2	2	4	−2	1	

Source: UEFA
Rules for classification: Group stage tiebreakers
(H) Hosts
10 June 2000
20:45

Belgium	2–1	Sweden
Goor 43'; É. Mpenza 46'	Report	Mjällby 53'

King Baudouin Stadium, Brussels
Attendance: 46,700
Referee: Markus Merk (Germany)

14 June 2000
20:45

Italy	2–0	Belgium
Totti 6'; Fiore 66'	Report

King Baudouin Stadium, Brussels
Attendance: 44,500
Referee: José María García-Aranda (Spain)

19 June 2000
20:45

Turkey	2–0	Belgium
Şükür 45+2', 70'	Report

King Baudouin Stadium, Brussels
Attendance: 48,000
Referee: Kim Milton Nielsen (Denmark) (Note: Nielsen suffered an injury in the 39th minute and was replaced by fourth official Günter Benkö (Austria).)

== Euro 2016 ==
Just like in Belgium's previous Euro tournament in 2000, they lost 2–0 to Italy in the group phase. In spite of winning with broad margins against the Republic of Ireland (3–0) and Hungary (4–0) at UEFA Euro 2016, Belgium's second talented generation exited the cup with a 3-1 quarter-final loss to Wales.

=== Group stage ===
Pos	Team	Pld	W	D	L	GF	GA	GD	Pts	Qualification
1	Italy	3	2	0	1	3	1	+2	6 (Note: Head-to-head result: Belgium 0–2 Italy.)	Advance to knockout stage
2	Belgium	3	2	0	1	4	2	+2	6	Advance to knockout stage
3	Republic of Ireland	3	1	1	1	2	4	−2	4	Advance to knockout stage
4	Sweden	3	0	1	2	1	3	−2	1	

Source: UEFA
Rules for classification: Group stage tiebreakers
Notes:
13 June 2016
21:00

Belgium	0–2	Italy
	Report	Giaccherini 32'; Pellè 90+3'

Parc Olympique Lyonnais, Décines-Charpieu
Attendance: 55,408
Referee: Mark Clattenburg (England)

18 June 2016
15:00

Belgium	3–0	Republic of Ireland
R. Lukaku 48', 70'; Witsel 61'	Report

Stade de Bordeaux, Bordeaux
Attendance: 39,493
Referee: Cüneyt Çakır (Turkey)

22 June 2016
21:00

Sweden	0–1	Belgium
	Report	Nainggolan 84'

Stade de Nice, Nice
Attendance: 34,011
Referee: Felix Brych (Germany)

=== Knockout stage ===
Round of 16

26 June 2016
21:00

Hungary	0–4	Belgium
	Report	Alderweireld 10'; Batshuayi 78'; Hazard 80'; Carrasco 90+1'

Stadium Municipal, Toulouse
Attendance: 28,921
Referee: Milorad Mažić (Serbia)

Quarter-finals

1 July 2016
21:00

Wales	3–1	Belgium
A. Williams 31'; Robson-Kanu 55'; Vokes 86'	Report	Nainggolan 13'

Stade Pierre-Mauroy, Villeneuve-d'Ascq
Attendance: 45,936
Referee: Damir Skomina (Slovenia)

== Euro 2020 ==
=== Group stage ===
Pos	Team	Pld	W	D	L	GF	GA	GD	Pts	Qualification
1	Belgium	3	3	0	0	7	1	+6	9	Advance to knockout stage
2	Denmark (H)	3	1	0	2	5	4	+1	3 (Note: Tied on head-to-head points (3). Head-to-head goal difference: Denmark +2, Finland 0, Russia −2.)	Advance to knockout stage
3	Finland	3	1	0	2	1	3	−2	3	
4	Russia (H)	3	1	0	2	2	7	−5	3	

Source: UEFA
Rules for classification: Group stage tiebreakers
(H) Hosts
Notes:
12 June 2021
21:00 (22:00 UTC+3)

Belgium	3–0	Russia
Lukaku 10', 88'; Meunier 34'	Report

Krestovsky Stadium, Saint Petersburg
Attendance: 26,264
Referee: Antonio Mateu Lahoz (Spain)

17 June 2021
18:00

Denmark	1–2	Belgium
Poulsen 2'	Report	T. Hazard 55'; De Bruyne 70'

Parken Stadium, Copenhagen
Attendance: 23,395
Referee: Björn Kuipers (Netherlands)

21 June 2021
21:00 (22:00 UTC+3)

Finland	0–2	Belgium
	Report	Hradecky 74' (o.g.); Lukaku 81'

Krestovsky Stadium, Saint Petersburg
Attendance: 18,545
Referee: Felix Brych (Germany)

=== Knockout stage ===
Round of 16

27 June 2021
21:00

Belgium	1–0	Portugal
T. Hazard 42'	Report

Estadio de La Cartuja, Seville
Attendance: 11,504
Referee: Felix Brych (Germany)

Quarter-finals

2 July 2021
21:00

Belgium	1–2	Italy
Lukaku 45+2' (pen.)	Report	Barella 31'; Insigne 44'

Allianz Arena, Munich
Attendance: 12,984
Referee: Slavko Vinčić (Slovenia)

== Euro 2024 ==
=== Group stage ===
Pos	Team	Pld	W	D	L	GF	GA	GD	Pts	Qualification
1	Romania	3	1	1	1	4	3	+1	4	Advance to knockout stage
2	Belgium	3	1	1	1	2	1	+1	4	Advance to knockout stage
3	Slovakia	3	1	1	1	3	3	0	4	Advance to knockout stage
4	Ukraine	3	1	1	1	2	4	−2	4	

Source: UEFA
17 June 2024
18:00

Belgium	0–1	Slovakia
	Report	Schranz 7'

Waldstadion, Frankfurt
Attendance: 45,181
Referee: Halil Umut Meler (Turkey)

22 June 2024
21:00

Belgium	2–0	Romania
Tielemans 2'; De Bruyne 80'	Report

RheinEnergieStadion, Cologne
Attendance: 42,535
Referee: Szymon Marciniak (Poland)

26 June 2024
18:00

Ukraine	0–0	Belgium
	Report

MHPArena, Stuttgart
Attendance: 54,000
Referee: Anthony Taylor (England)

=== Knockout stage ===
Round of 16

1 July 2024
18:00

France	1–0	Belgium
Vertonghen 85' (o.g.)	Report

Merkur Spiel-Arena, Düsseldorf
Attendance: 46,810
Referee: Glenn Nyberg (Sweden)

== Goalscorers ==
Player	Goals	1972	1980	1984	2000	2016	2020	2024
Romelu Lukaku	6					2	4	
Jan Ceulemans	2		1	1				
Kevin De Bruyne	2						1	1
Thorgan Hazard	2						2	
Radja Nainggolan	2					2		
Toby Alderweireld	1					1		
Michy Batshuayi	1					1		
Yannick Carrasco	1					1		
Julien Cools	1		1					
Eric Gerets	1		1					
Bart Goor	1				1			
Georges Grün	1			1				
Eden Hazard	1					1		
Raoul Lambert	1	1						
Thomas Meunier	1						1	
Émile Mpenza	1				1			
Odilon Polleunis	1	1						
Youri Tielemans	1							1
Paul Van Himst	1	1						
Erwin Vandenbergh	1			1				
René Vandereycken	1		1					
Frank Vercauteren	1			1				
Axel Witsel	1					1		
Own goals	1						1	
Total	33	3	4	4	2	9	9	2

== See also ==
- Belgium national football team records and statistics
- Belgium at the FIFA World Cup

== Head-to-head record ==
Opponent	Pld	W	D	L	GF	GA	GD	Win %
Denmark	2	1	0	1	4	4	+0	50.00
England	1	0	1	0	1	1	+0	0.00
Finland	1	1	0	0	2	0	+2	100.00
France	2	0	0	2	0	6	−6	0.00
Germany	2	0	0	2	2	4	−2	0.00
Hungary	2	2	0	0	6	1	+5	100.00
Italy	4	0	1	3	1	6	−5	0.00
Portugal	1	1	0	0	1	0	+1	100.00
Republic of Ireland	1	1	0	0	3	0	+3	100.00
Romania	1	1	0	0	2	0	+2	100.00
Russia	1	1	0	0	3	0	+3	100.00
Serbia	1	1	0	0	2	0	+2	100.00
Slovakia	1	0	0	1	0	1	−1	0.00
Spain	1	1	0	0	2	1	+1	100.00
Sweden	2	2	0	0	3	1	+2	100.00
Turkey	1	0	0	1	0	2	−2	0.00
Ukraine	1	0	1	0	0	0	+0	0.00
Wales	1	0	0	1	1	3	−2	0.00
Total	26	12	3	11	33	30	+3	46.15
