= UEFA Euro 1980 knockout stage =

Football tournament knockout stage

The knockout stage of UEFA Euro 1980 was a single-elimination tournament involving the four teams that qualified from the group stage of the tournament. There were two matches: a third place play-off contested by the group runners-up, and the final to decide the champions, contested by the group winners. The knockout stage began with the third place play-off on 21 June and ended with the final on 22 June at the Stadio Olimpico in Rome. West Germany won the tournament with a 2–1 victory over Belgium.

All times Central European Summer Time (UTC+2)

== Format ==
For the third place play-off, if the scores remained level after the end of the regular 90 minutes, the match would go straight to a penalty shoot-out (at least five penalties each, and more if necessary). If the final was undecided by the end of the regular 90 minutes, thirty minutes of extra time (two 15-minute halves) would be played. If scores were still level after 30 minutes of extra time, there would be a penalty shoot-out (at least five penalties each, and more if necessary) to determine the champion.

== Qualified teams ==
The top two placed teams from each of the two groups qualified for the knockout stage.

| Group | Winners (qualification for final) | Runners-up (qualification for third place play-off) |
|---|---|---|
| 1 | West Germany | Czechoslovakia |
| 2 | Belgium | Italy |

== Bracket ==
Final
22 June – Rome
Belgium | 1
West Germany | 2
Third place play-off
21 June – Naples
Czechoslovakia (p) | 1 (9)
Italy | 1 (8)

== Third place play-off ==
21 June 1980
20:30

| Czechoslovakia | 1–1 | Italy |
|---|---|---|
| Jurkemik 54' | Report | Graziani 73' |
Penalties
| Masný (penalty scored); Nehoda (penalty scored); Ondruš (penalty scored); Jurkemik (penalty scored); Panenka (penalty scored); Gögh (penalty scored); Gajdůšek (penalty scored); Kozák (penalty scored); Barmoš (penalty scored) | 9–8 | (penalty scored) Causio; (penalty scored) Altobelli; (penalty scored) G. Baresi; (penalty scored) Cabrini; (penalty scored) Benetti; (penalty scored) Graziani; (penalty scored) Scirea; (penalty scored) Tardelli; (penalty missed) Collovati |

Stadio San Paolo, Naples
Attendance: 24,652
Referee: Erich Linemayr (Austria)

| Czechoslovakia | Italy |

| GK | 1 | Jaroslav Netolička |
| SW | 4 | Anton Ondruš (c) |
| CB | 2 | Jozef Barmoš |
| CB | 12 | Rostislav Vojáček |
| CB | 5 | Koloman Gögh |
| CM | 7 | Ján Kozák |
| CM | 3 | Ladislav Jurkemik | Booked |
| CM | 8 | Antonín Panenka |
| RW | 10 | Marián Masný |
| CF | 11 | Zdeněk Nehoda |
| LW | 15 | Ladislav Vízek | | (substituted off) 64' |
Substitutions:
| FW | 9 | Miroslav Gajdůšek | | (substituted on) 64' |
Manager:
Jozef Vengloš

| GK | 1 | Dino Zoff (c) |
| SW | 9 | Gaetano Scirea |
| CB | 7 | Claudio Gentile |
| CB | 6 | Fulvio Collovati |
| CB | 5 | Antonio Cabrini |
| RM | 19 | Franco Causio |
| CM | 3 | Giuseppe Baresi |
| CM | 18 | Roberto Bettega | (substituted off) 83' |
| LM | 15 | Marco Tardelli |
| CF | 20 | Francesco Graziani |
| CF | 17 | Alessandro Altobelli |
Substitutions:
| MF | 11 | Romeo Benetti | (substituted on) 83' |
Manager:
Enzo Bearzot

== Final ==
22 June 1980
20:30

| Belgium | 1–2 | West Germany |
|---|---|---|
| Vandereycken 75' (pen.) | Report | Hrubesch 10', 88' |

Stadio Olimpico, Rome
Attendance: 47,860
Referee: Nicolae Rainea (Romania)

| Belgium | West Germany |

| GK | 12 | Jean-Marie Pfaff |
| RB | 2 | Eric Gerets |
| CB | 4 | Walter Meeuws |
| CB | 3 | Luc Millecamps | (yellow card) 35' |
| LB | 5 | Michel Renquin |
| RM | 6 | Julien Cools (c) |
| CM | 8 | Wilfried Van Moer |
| CM | 7 | René Vandereycken | (yellow card) 55' |
| LM | 17 | Raymond Mommens |
| CF | 9 | François Van der Elst | (yellow card) 89' |
| CF | 11 | Jan Ceulemans |
Manager:
Guy Thys

| GK | 1 | Toni Schumacher |
| SW | 15 | Uli Stielike |
| CB | 5 | Bernard Dietz (c) |
| CB | 4 | Karlheinz Förster | (yellow card) 59' |
| RWB | 20 | Manfred Kaltz |
| LWB | 2 | Hans-Peter Briegel | | (substituted off) 55' |
| CM | 6 | Bernd Schuster |
| CM | 10 | Hansi Müller |
| AM | 8 | Karl-Heinz Rummenigge |
| CF | 9 | Horst Hrubesch |
| CF | 11 | Klaus Allofs |
Substitutions:
| MF | 3 | Bernhard Cullmann | | (substituted on) 55' |
Manager:
Jupp Derwall
