= UEFA Euro 1980 final =

Final game of the UEFA Euro 1980

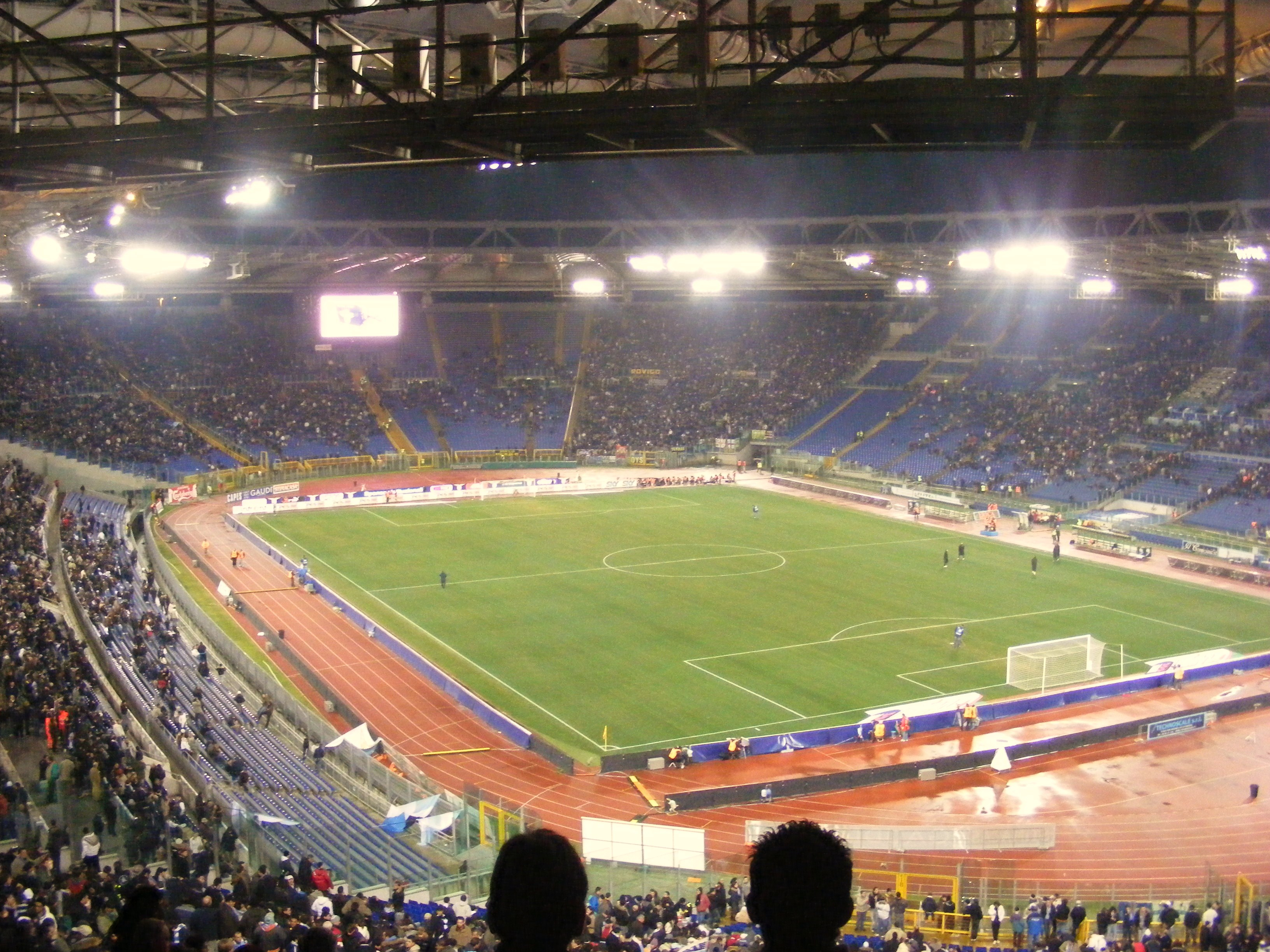
- The Stadio Olimpico (pictured in 2008) held the final
- Event: UEFA Euro 1980
Belgium	West Germany
1	2
- Date: 22 June 1980
- Venue: Stadio Olimpico, Rome
- Referee: Nicolae Rainea (Romania)
- Attendance: 47,860

The UEFA Euro 1980 final was the final match of UEFA Euro 1980, the sixth European Championship, UEFA's top football competition for national teams. The match was played at the Stadio Olimpico in Rome, Italy, on 22 June 1980, and was contested between Belgium and West Germany.

En route to the final, Belgium finished top of their qualifying group, before reaching the final as winners of the tournament's Group 2, which included Italy, England and Spain. West Germany, who had ended the previous European Championship as runners-up, also won their qualifying group, and went on to secure a spot in the final after finishing top of the tournament's Group 1, which included Greece, Czechoslovakia and the Netherlands.

The final took place in front of 47,860 spectators, with Nicolae Rainea from Romania acting as the referee. West Germany won 2–1 to secure a second European Championship title in three attempts.

== Background ==
UEFA Euro 1980 was the sixth edition of the UEFA European Football Championship, UEFA's football competition for national teams. Qualifying rounds were played on a home-and-away round-robin tournament basis prior to the final tournament taking place in Italy, between 11 and 22 June 1980. There, the eight qualified teams were divided into two groups of four with each team playing one another once. The winners of each group then faced each other in the final with the runners-up of each group participating in a third-place play-off match.

In the previous international tournament, the 1978 FIFA World Cup, West Germany were knocked out in the second group stage, placing third behind the Netherlands and Italy. Belgium had failed to progress past the first qualifying stage as they ended second in group 4, five points behind the Netherlands. The UEFA Euro 1980 Final was the fifteenth meeting between West Germany and Belgium, with ten of those matches being won by West Germany, the remainder by Belgium. They had last faced each other in a competitive game eight years prior, in UEFA Euro 1972, when West Germany had won 2–1 in the semi-final.

== Route to the final ==
=== West Germany ===
West Germany began their UEFA Euro 1980 campaign in qualifying group 7 where their opponents were Turkey, Wales and Malta. After playing each team both home and away, West Germany had won four matches and drawn the other two, to finish top of the group, three points ahead of Turkey, to qualify for the final tournament in Belgium.

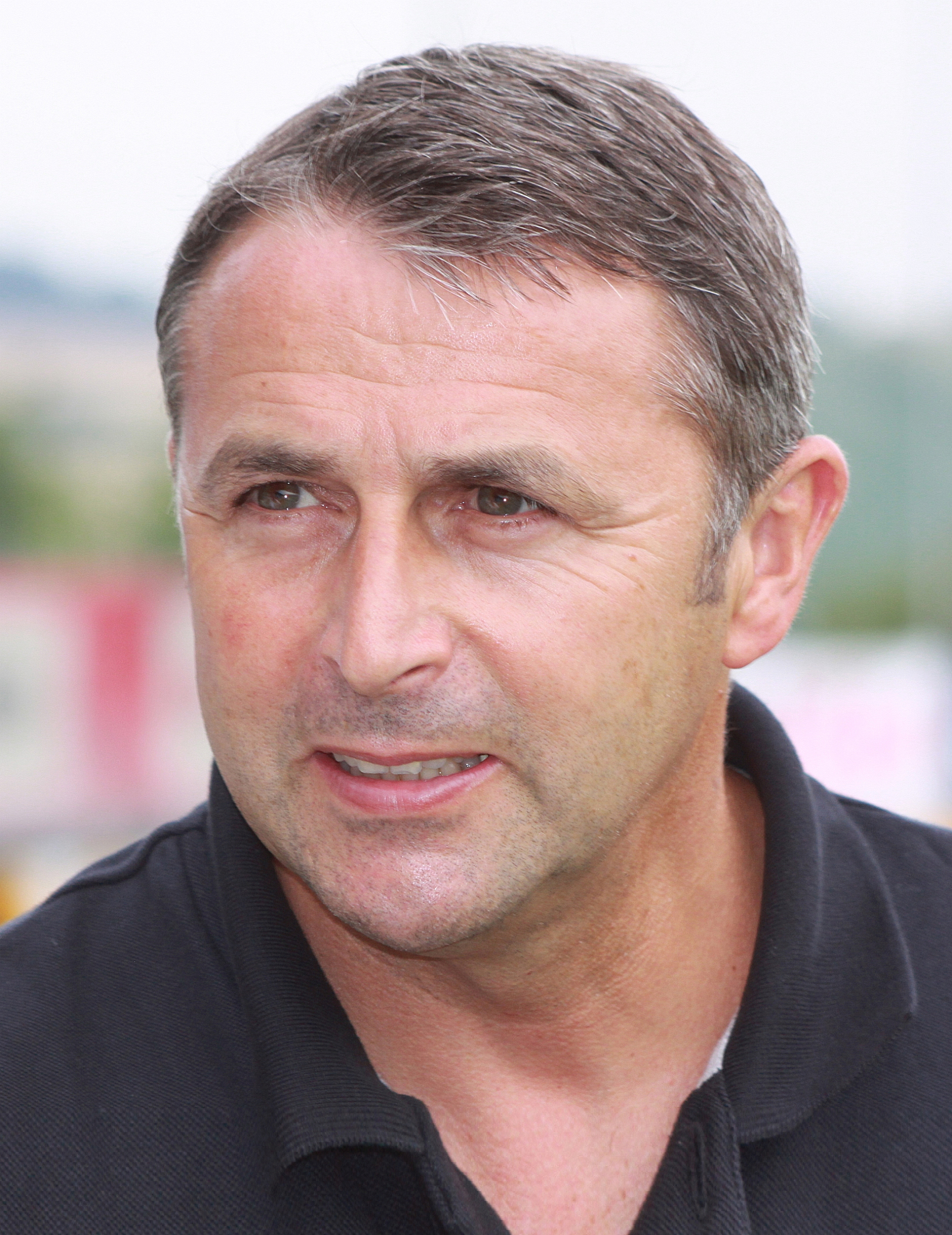
Klaus Allofs (pictured in 2008) scored a hat-trick against the Netherlands.

There, they were drawn in group 1 alongside Czechoslovakia, Greece and the Netherlands. The first match was against the reigning European Championship winners, Czechoslovakia, and held on 11 June 1980 at the Stadio Olimpico in Rome with 11,059 spectators, in a repeat of the 1976 final. Jupp Derwall, the West Germany manager, selected a defensive line-up after Herbert Zimmerman was injured on the morning of the match. Author Jonathan O'Brien described the West Germany team as "playing like Eintracht Frankfurt reserves on a bad night", Uli Stielike's curling shot went over the Czechoslovakia crossbar before Ladislav Vízek beat two West Germany defenders before rolling his shot along the goal-line. In the 57th minute, Hansi Müller played in a cross to the far post where Karl-Heinz Rummenigge out-jumped Czechoslovakia's goalkeeper Jaroslav Netolička to score with a header. West Germany had further chances to score but Netolička saved from Hans-Peter Briegel before Müller shot wide, and the game ended 1–0.

West Germany's second group match saw them face the Netherlands at the Stadio San Paolo in Naples on 14 June 1980. Klaus Allofs gave West Germany the lead midway through the first half, scoring after Bernd Schuster's shot rebounded off the Netherlands goal post. Horst Hrubesch saw his header cleared off the Netherlands goal-line and although Michel van de Korput brought down Rummenigge in the Netherlands penalty area, the referee did not award a penalty kick. After a number of ill-tempered challenges between the sides, West Germany doubled their lead fifteen minutes into the second half. Schuster won the ball from Arie Haan before playing it to Müller; he passed to Allofs who scored his and West Germany's second goal. Six minutes later, Allofs completed his hat-trick, scoring with his knee from a Schuster cross. Dick Nanninga and Hann then went close to scoring for the Netherlands and with ten minutes remaining, they were awarded a penalty after Lothar Matthäus was adjudged to have fouled Ben Wijnstekers inside the West Germany penalty area. Johnny Rep scored from the penalty spot to make it 3–1. Five minutes later, Willy van de Kerkhof struck a low shot past Toni Schumacher into the West Germany goal to make it 3–2 which remained the score at the final whistle.

The final group stage match for West Germany was against Greece at the Stadio Comunale in Turin on 17 June 1980. Derwall once again adopted a defensive approach to the game and rested Schuster, Allofs and Bernard Dietz, all of whom had been booked earlier in the tournament. In the first half, Rummenigge's header was saved by Eleftherios Poupakis, the Greece goalkeeper, while Hrubesch sent a headed shot over the Greece crossbar. Briegel then beat four Greece defenders but his shot was straight at Popuakis. After half-time, Rummenigge's lob went over Poupakis but bounced wide of the Greece goalpost. In the 80th minute, Christos Ardizoglou's shot from 25 yards (23 m) hit the West Germany post but the match ended goalless. West Germany ended the group stage at the top of the table with five points, two ahead of Czechoslovakia and the Netherlands, and qualified for their third consecutive UEFA European Championship final.

=== Belgium ===
Belgium's UEFA Euro 1980 campaign started in qualifying group 2 where they faced Austria, Portugal, Scotland and Norway. Each team met one another both at home and away, after which Belgium had won four and drawn four of their matches to finish top of the group, one point ahead of Austria, to qualify for the final tournament.

Belgium were place in group 2 which consisted of Italy, England and Spain. The first match was against England and took place at the Stadio Comunale in Turin on 12 June 1980. Midway through the first half, Ray Wilkins took possession of the ball from a Walter Meeuws headed clearance, chipped it over two Belgium defenders before lobbing it into the goal over Belgium goalkeeper Jean-Marie Pfaff. Minutes later, England failed to Wilfried Van Moer's corner and it fell to Jan Ceulemans who scored. Fighting in the crowd then broke out and the game was suspended for five minutes as England's goalkeeper Ray Clemence needed treatment for the effects of tear gas which the local police had deployed to quell the violence. In the second half, Tony Woodcock put the ball into Belgium's net but the goal was disallowed as Kenny Sansom was adjudged to have been offside, and the game ended without further goals in a 1–1 draw.

Belgium's second group match saw them face Spain at the San Siro in Milan on 15 June 1980. Seventeen minutes into the game, Eric Gerets played a one-two with Meeuws and his weak shot beat Luis Arconada, the Spain goalkeeper, to give Belgium a 1–0 lead. François Van der Elst and Erwin Vandenbergh both missed opportunities to score before Spain equalised after Quini headed the ball past Pfaff from a Juanito free kick. Spain's Juan Manuel Asensi was then forced to leave the pitch with an injury after which Belgium dominated the game, including a René Vandereycken free kick which was saved by Arconada. In the second half, both Quini and Jesús María Satrústegui missed chances to score for Spain and, in the 65th minute, Julien Cools scored, converting Ceulemans' cross which had deflected off Vicente del Bosque, to ensure a 2–1 victory for Belgium.

The final group match for Belgium was against hosts Italy at the Stadio Olimpico in Rome on 18 June 1980. According to O'Brien, "Belgium made the hosts drink their own rancid medicine", a reference to the quarter-final of the 1972 tournament. He continued that "their massed defence and midfield grimly suffocated the life out of Italy". It was an ill-tempered game in which five players were booked. Pfaff made a double-save in the second half from Francesco Graziani before Italy's appeals for a penalty when Meeuws appeared to handle the ball were rejected by the referee. The match ended in a 0–0 draw. Belgium finished the group stage tied on four points and level on goal difference with Italy but having scored more goals, and so progressed to the tournament final.

=== Summary ===
Belgium
Round
West Germany
Opponent
Result
Group stage
Opponent
Result
England
1–1
Match 1
Czechoslovakia
1–0
Spain
2–1
Match 2
Netherlands
3–2
Italy
0–0
Match 3
Greece
0–0
Group 2 winners

Pos	Team	Pld	Pts
1	Belgium	3	4
2	Italy (H)	3	4
3	England	3	3
4	Spain	3	1

Source: UEFA
(H) Hosts
Final standings
Group 1 winners

Pos	Team	Pld	Pts
1	West Germany	3	5
2	Czechoslovakia	3	3
3	Netherlands	3	3
4	Greece	3	1

Source: UEFA

== Match ==
=== Pre-match ===
West Germany recalled Dietz, Schuster and Allofs to their team, while Belgium's starting line-up was unchanged from their last group match against Italy, although a number of players had to cancel family holidays they had booked in anticipation that they would not have progressed so far in the tournament.

=== Summary ===
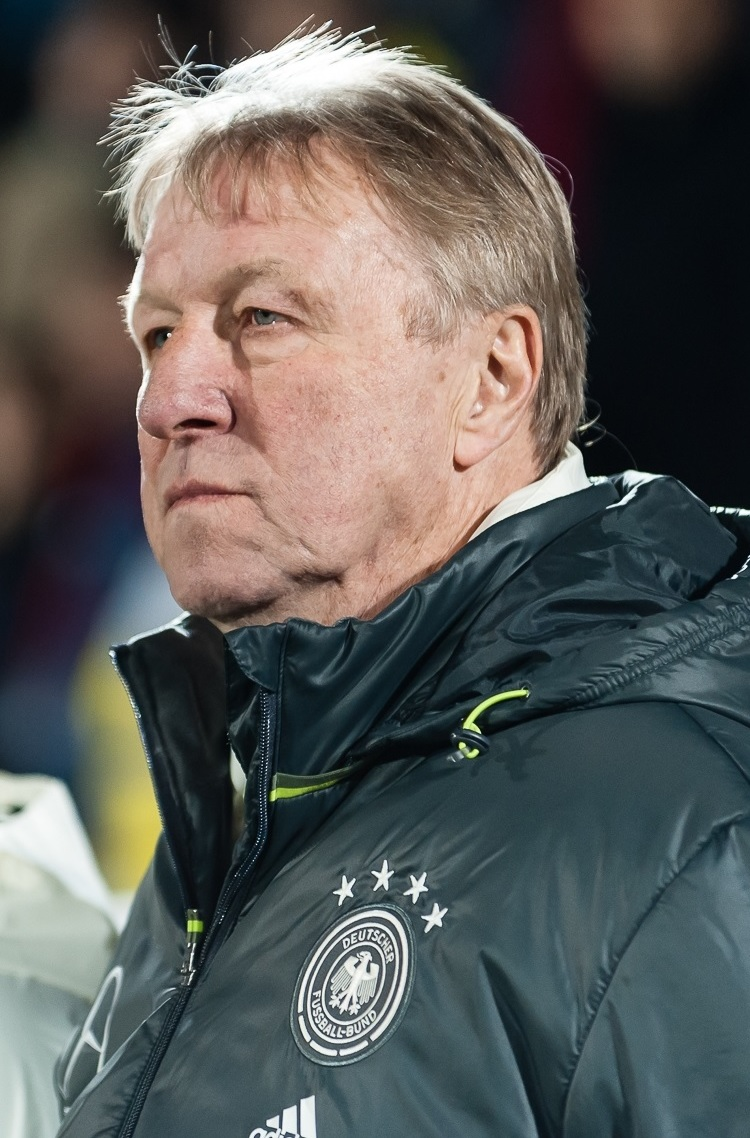
West Germany's Horst Hrubesch (pictured in 2016) scored both of his side's goals.

The final took place at the Stadio Olimpico in Rome on 21 June 1980 in front of 47,864 spectators and was refereed by Nicolae Rainea from Romania. In the fourth minute, Müller took control of the ball after Gerets headed it clear and shot from the edge of the penalty area but his strike was pushed around the post by Pfaff. West Germany took the lead in the tenth minute through Hrubesch. Schuster played a one-two with Alloffs before chipping the ball over Gerets to Hrubesch who controlled it with his chest before striking it on the half-volley into the far corner of the Belgium goal. Van der Elst then had the opportunity to equalise almost immediately: Schuster conceded possession to Ceulemans whose pass sent Van der Elst through on goal but his shot went high over the crossbar as Schumacher charged out. Ceulemans made a weak connection with a scissor kick from a Cools cross, but Schumacher saved the shot. Schuster's strike from 25 yards (23 m) was kept out by Pfaff before Alloffs drew another save from the Belgium goalkeeper.

Ten minutes into the second half, West Germany were forced to make a substitution when Briegel injured his left ankle in a tackle with Vandereycken and was replaced by Bernhard Cullmann. Both Geets and Meeuws saw their shots fly wide of the West Germany goal, before Vandereycken's strike in the 60th minute from a Raymond Mommens pass was saved by Schumacher. In the 75th minute, Schuster lost possession 10 yards (9 m) inside his own half and Manfred Kaltz inadvertently played the ball to Van der Elst who headed it goalbound and was fouled by Stielike. Although the initial contact appeared to have been outside West Germany's penalty area, the referee awarded a penalty that Vandereycken scored, with Schumacher diving the wrong way. Michel Renquin then blocked Müller's shot after Rummenigge had played in a cross, before Gerets prevented Rummenigge from scoring. Pfaff was forced to make a save after Dietz's shot was deflected off two defenders and fell to Schuster. With 90 seconds of the match remaining, Rummenigge's corner found Hrubesch who had made a late run into the penalty area and he headed the ball into the Belgium goal from close range to secure a 2–1 victory for West Germany, and their second European Championship in three attempts.

=== Details ===
22 June 1980
20:30 CEST

Belgium	1–2	West Germany
Vandereycken 75' (pen.)	Report	Hrubesch 10', 88'

Stadio Olimpico, Rome
Attendance: 47,860
Referee: Nicolae Rainea (Romania)

Belgium	West Germany

GK	12	Jean-Marie Pfaff
RB	2	Eric Gerets
CB	4	Walter Meeuws
CB	3	Luc Millecamps	(yellow card) 35'
LB	5	Michel Renquin
RM	6	Julien Cools (c)
CM	8	Wilfried Van Moer
CM	7	René Vandereycken	(yellow card) 55'
LM	17	Raymond Mommens
CF	9	François Van der Elst	(yellow card) 89'
CF	11	Jan Ceulemans
Manager:
Guy Thys

GK	1	Toni Schumacher
SW	15	Uli Stielike
CB	5	Bernard Dietz (c)
CB	4	Karlheinz Förster	(yellow card) 59'
RWB	20	Manfred Kaltz
LWB	2	Hans-Peter Briegel		(substituted off) 55'
CM	6	Bernd Schuster
CM	10	Hansi Müller
AM	8	Karl-Heinz Rummenigge
CF	9	Horst Hrubesch
CF	11	Klaus Allofs
Substitutions:
MF	3	Bernhard Cullmann		(substituted in) 55'
Manager:
Jupp Derwall

== Post-match ==
All but four of UEFA's team of the tournament had featured in the final, including one Belgium and six West Germany players. Rummenigge was awarded the 1980 Ballon d'Or. Hrubesch later said, "We wouldn't have made it in extra time because it would have been too much ... It was very hot that day and I recall being so tired after the game that it was hard to lift the trophy."

In the following international tournament, the 1982 FIFA World Cup, West Germany were beaten in the final 3–1 by Italy. Belgium, in contrast, failed to progress past the second qualifying round, finishing bottom of the group with losses against both the Soviet Union and Poland.

== See also ==
- Belgium at the UEFA European Championship
- Germany at the UEFA European Championship
