= UEFA Euro 1980 Group 1 =

Football tournament group stage

Group 1 of UEFA Euro 1980 began on 11 June 1980, and ended on 17 June 1980. The pool was made up of holders Czechoslovakia, West Germany, Netherlands, and Greece.

== Teams ==
Team	Method of qualification	Date of qualification	Finals appearance	Last appearance	Previous best performance
Czechoslovakia	Group 5 winner	24 November 1979	3rd	1976	Winners (1976)
Greece	Group 6 winner	31 October 1979	1st	—	Debut
Netherlands	Group 4 winner	21 November 1979	2nd	1976	Third place (1976)
West Germany	Group 7 winner	22 December 1979	3rd	1976	Winners (1972)

== Standings ==
Pos	Team	Pld	W	D	L	GF	GA	GD	Pts	Qualification
1	West Germany	3	2	1	0	4	2	+2	5	Advance to final
2	Czechoslovakia	3	1	1	1	4	3	+1	3	Advance to third place play-off
3	Netherlands	3	1	1	1	4	4	0	3	
4	Greece	3	0	1	2	1	4	−3	1	

Source: UEFA
Rules for classification: Group stage tiebreakers

In the knockout stage,

- The winner of Group 1, West Germany, advanced to play the winner of Group 2, Belgium, in the final.
- The runner-up of Group 1, Czechoslovakia, advanced to play the runner-up of Group 2, Italy, in the third place play-off.

== Matches ==
=== Czechoslovakia vs West Germany ===
11 June 1980
17:45

Czechoslovakia	0–1	West Germany
	Report	Rummenigge 57'

Stadio Olimpico, Rome
Attendance: 10,500
Referee: Alberto Michelotti (Italy)

Czechoslovakia	West Germany

GK	1	Jaroslav Netolička
RB	2	Jozef Barmoš
CB	4	Anton Ondruš (c)
CB	3	Ladislav Jurkemik
LB	5	Koloman Gögh
CM	7	Ján Kozák
CM	6	František Štambachr
CM	8	Antonín Panenka
RW	9	Miroslav Gajdůšek	(substituted off) 66'
CF	15	Ladislav Vízek
LW	11	Zdeněk Nehoda
Substitutions:
FW	10	Marián Masný	(substituted on) 66'
Manager:
Jozef Vengloš

GK	1	Harald Schumacher
RB	20	Manfred Kaltz
CB	3	Bernhard Cullmann
CB	4	Karlheinz Förster
LB	5	Bernard Dietz (c)	Booked
RM	7	Bernd Förster		(substituted off) 60'
CM	15	Uli Stielike
CM	2	Hans-Peter Briegel
LM	10	Hansi Müller
CF	8	Karl-Heinz Rummenigge
CF	11	Klaus Allofs	Booked
Substitutions:
MF	14	Felix Magath		(substituted on) 60'
Manager:
Jupp Derwall

=== Netherlands vs Greece ===
11 June 1980
20:30

Netherlands	1–0	Greece
Kist 65' (pen.)	Report

Stadio San Paolo, Naples
Attendance: 14,990
Referee: Adolf Prokop (East Germany)

Netherlands	Greece

GK	1	Piet Schrijvers		(substituted off) 15'
RB	2	Ben Wijnstekers
CB	5	Ruud Krol (c)
CB	3	Michel van de Korput
LB	4	Hugo Hovenkamp
DM	15	Huub Stevens
CM	10	Arie Haan
CM	8	Willy van de Kerkhof	Booked
RW	17	Martien Vreijsen		(substituted off) 46'
CF	9	Kees Kist
LW	7	René van de Kerkhof
Substitutions:
GK	16	Pim Doesburg		(substituted on) 15'
MF	13	Dick Nanninga		(substituted on) 46'
Manager:
Jan Zwartkruis

GK	1	Vasilis Konstantinou
RB	2	Ioannis Kyrastas
CB	5	Giorgos Foiros
CB	4	Anthimos Kapsis (c)
LB	3	Konstantinos Iosifidis
CM	6	Spiros Livathinos
CM	16	Dinos Kouis
CM	7	Christos Terzanidis
RW	9	Christos Ardizoglou		(substituted off) 68'
CF	19	Giorgos Kostikos		(substituted off) 78'
LW	15	Thomas Mavros	Booked
Substitutions:
FW	20	Nikos Anastopoulos		(substituted on) 68'
FW	10	Maik Galakos		(substituted on) 78'
Manager:
Alketas Panagoulias

=== West Germany vs Netherlands ===
14 June 1980
17:45

West Germany	3–2	Netherlands
Allofs 20', 60', 65'	Report	Rep 79' (pen.); W. van de Kerkhof 85'

Stadio San Paolo, Naples
Attendance: 29,889
Referee: Robert Wurtz (France)

West Germany	Netherlands

GK	1	Harald Schumacher
CB	5	Bernard Dietz (c)		(substituted off) 73'
CB	15	Uli Stielike
CB	4	Karlheinz Förster
RWB	20	Manfred Kaltz
LWB	2	Hans-Peter Briegel
CM	6	Bernd Schuster	Booked
CM	10	Hansi Müller		(substituted off) 65'
AM	8	Karl-Heinz Rummenigge
CF	9	Horst Hrubesch
CF	11	Klaus Allofs
Substitutions:
MF	14	Felix Magath		(substituted on) 65'
MF	18	Lothar Matthäus		(substituted on) 73'
Manager:
Jupp Derwall

GK	1	Piet Schrijvers
RB	2	Ben Wijnstekers
CB	5	Ruud Krol (c)
CB	3	Michel van de Korput
LB	4	Hugo Hovenkamp		(substituted off) 46'
DM	15	Huub Stevens	Booked
CM	10	Arie Haan
CM	8	Willy van de Kerkhof
RW	12	Johnny Rep
CF	9	Kees Kist		(substituted off) 69'
LW	7	René van de Kerkhof
Substitutions:
MF	13	Dick Nanninga		(substituted on) 46'
MF	18	Frans Thijssen		(substituted on) 69'
Manager:
Jan Zwartkruis

=== Greece vs Czechoslovakia ===
14 June 1980
20:30

Greece	1–3	Czechoslovakia
Anastopoulos 14'	Report	Panenka 6'; Vízek 26'; Nehoda 63'

Stadio Olimpico, Rome
Attendance: 7,614
Referee: Pat Partridge (England)

Greece	Czechoslovakia

GK	1	Vasilis Konstantinou
RB	2	Ioannis Kyrastas
CB	5	Giorgos Foiros
CB	4	Anthimos Kapsis (c)
LB	3	Konstantinos Iosifidis
CM	6	Spiros Livathinos
CM	7	Christos Terzanidis	(substituted off) 46'
CM	16	Dinos Kouis
RW	20	Nikos Anastopoulos
CF	19	Giorgos Kostikos	(substituted off) 57'
LW	15	Thomas Mavros
Substitutions:
FW	10	Maik Galakos	(substituted on) 46'
MF	13	Charalambos Xanthopoulos	(substituted on) 57'
Manager:
Alketas Panagoulias

GK	21	Stanislav Seman
RB	2	Jozef Barmoš
CB	4	Anton Ondruš (c)
CB	3	Ladislav Jurkemik
LB	5	Koloman Gögh
CM	7	Ján Kozák
CM	8	Antonín Panenka
CM	18	Jan Berger	(substituted off) 23'
RW	10	Marián Masný
CF	15	Ladislav Vízek
LW	11	Zdeněk Nehoda	(substituted off) 74'
Substitutions:
FW	13	Werner Lička	(substituted on) 23'
FW	9	Miroslav Gajdůšek	(substituted on) 74'
Manager:
Jozef Vengloš

=== Netherlands vs Czechoslovakia ===
17 June 1980
17:45

Netherlands	1–1	Czechoslovakia
Kist 59'	Report	Nehoda 16'

San Siro, Milan
Attendance: 11,889
Referee: Hilmi Ok (Turkey)

Netherlands	Czechoslovakia

GK	1	Piet Schrijvers
RB	2	Ben Wijnstekers
CB	5	Ruud Krol (c)
CB	3	Michel van de Korput
LB	4	Hugo Hovenkamp
CM	6	Jan Poortvliet
CM	8	Willy van de Kerkhof
CM	18	Frans Thijssen
RW	12	Johnny Rep	Booked
CF	13	Dick Nanninga		(substituted off) 46'
LW	7	René van de Kerkhof		(substituted off) 15'
Substitutions:
FW	9	Kees Kist		(substituted on) 15'
MF	10	Arie Haan	Booked	(substituted on) 46'
Manager:
Jan Zwartkruis

GK	1	Jaroslav Netolička
RB	2	Jozef Barmoš
CB	12	Rostislav Vojáček
CB	4	Anton Ondruš (c)
LB	5	Koloman Gögh
DM	3	Ladislav Jurkemik
CM	7	Ján Kozák
CM	8	Antonín Panenka	(substituted off) 89'
RW	10	Marián Masný	(substituted off) 66'
CF	15	Ladislav Vízek
LW	11	Zdeněk Nehoda
Substitutions:
FW	13	Werner Lička	(substituted on) 66'
MF	6	František Štambachr	(substituted on) 89'
Manager:
Jozef Vengloš

=== Greece vs West Germany ===
17 June 1980
20:30

Greece	0–0	West Germany
	Report

Stadio Comunale, Turin
Attendance: 13,901
Referee: Brian McGinlay (Scotland)

Greece	West Germany

GK	21	Eleftherios Poupakis
RB	13	Charalambos Xanthopoulos
CB	12	Ioannis Gounaris	Booked
CB	17	Petros Ravousis
LB	18	Lakis Nikolaou
CM	6	Spiros Livathinos
CM	8	Takis Nikoloudis (c)		(substituted off) 65'
CM	16	Dinos Kouis
RW	9	Christos Ardizoglou
CF	10	Maik Galakos
LW	15	Thomas Mavros		(substituted off) 79'
Substitutions:
MF	14	Giorgos Koudas		(substituted on) 65'
FW	19	Giorgos Kostikos		(substituted on) 79'
Manager:
Alketas Panagoulias

GK	1	Harald Schumacher
RB	20	Manfred Kaltz
CB	15	Uli Stielike
CB	4	Karlheinz Förster
LB	7	Bernd Förster	(substituted off) 46'
CM	2	Hans-Peter Briegel
CM	3	Bernhard Cullmann (c)
CM	10	Hansi Müller
RW	8	Karl-Heinz Rummenigge	(substituted off) 66'
CF	9	Horst Hrubesch
LW	12	Caspar Memering
Substitutions:
MF	19	Miroslav Votava	(substituted on) 46'
FW	17	Calle Del'Haye	(substituted on) 66'
Manager:
Jupp Derwall

== See also ==
- Czech Republic at the UEFA European Championship
- Germany at the UEFA European Championship
- Greece at the UEFA European Championship
- Netherlands at the UEFA European Championship
- Slovakia at the UEFA European Championship
