= UEFA Euro 1980 Group 2 =

Football tournament group stage

Group 2 of UEFA Euro 1980 began on 12 June 1980, and ended on 18 June 1980. The pool was made up of Belgium, England, hosts Italy, and Spain.

== Teams ==
Team	Method of qualification	Date of qualification	Finals appearance	Last appearance	Previous best performance
Belgium	Group 2 winner	19 December 1979	2nd	1972	Third place (1972)
England	Group 1 winner	21 November 1979	2nd	1968	Third place (1968)
Italy	Host	12 November 1977	2nd	1968	Winners (1968)
Spain	Group 3 winner	9 December 1979	2nd	1964	Winners (1964)

== Standings ==
Pos	Team	Pld	W	D	L	GF	GA	GD	Pts	Qualification
1	Belgium	3	1	2	0	3	2	+1	4	Advance to final
2	Italy (H)	3	1	2	0	1	0	+1	4	Advance to third place play-off
3	England	3	1	1	1	3	3	0	3	
4	Spain	3	0	1	2	2	4	−2	1	

Source: UEFA
Rules for classification: Group stage tiebreakers
(H) Hosts

In the knockout stage,

- The winner of Group 2, Belgium, advanced to play the winner of Group 1, West Germany, in the final.
- The runner-up of Group 2, Italy, advanced to play the runner-up of Group 1, Czechoslovakia, in the third place play-off.

== Matches ==
=== Belgium vs England ===
12 June 1980
17:45

Belgium	1–1	England
Ceulemans 29'	Report	Wilkins 26'

Stadio Comunale, Turin
Attendance: 15,186
Referee: Heinz Aldinger (West Germany)

Belgium	England

GK	12	Jean-Marie Pfaff
RB	2	Eric Gerets
CB	3	Luc Millecamps
CB	4	Walter Meeuws
LB	5	Michel Renquin
CM	6	Julien Cools (c)
CM	8	Wilfried Van Moer	(substituted off) 88'
CM	7	René Vandereycken
RW	9	François Van der Elst
CF	11	Jan Ceulemans
LW	10	Erwin Vandenbergh
Substitutions:
FW	17	Raymond Mommens	(substituted on) 88'
Manager:
Guy Thys

GK	1	Ray Clemence
RB	2	Phil Neal
CB	4	Phil Thompson
CB	5	Dave Watson
LB	3	Kenny Sansom
CM	10	Trevor Brooking
CM	6	Ray Wilkins
AM	7	Kevin Keegan (c)
RW	8	Steve Coppell	(substituted off) 81'
CF	9	David Johnson	(substituted off) 70'
LW	11	Tony Woodcock
Substitutions:
MF	18	Ray Kennedy	(substituted on) 70'
MF	17	Terry McDermott	(substituted on) 81'
Manager:
Ron Greenwood

=== Spain vs Italy ===
12 June 1980
20:30

Spain	0–0	Italy
	Report

San Siro, Milan
Attendance: 46,337
Referee: Károly Palotai (Hungary)

Spain	Italy

GK	1	Luis Arconada
RB	20	Miguel Tendillo
CB	2	José Ramón Alexanko
CB	3	Migueli
LB	14	Rafael Gordillo
RM	18	Enrique Saura
CM	6	Juan Manuel Asensi (c)
CM	21	Jesús María Zamora
LM	10	Quini
CF	7	Dani		(substituted off) 53'
CF	17	Jesús María Satrústegui	(yellow card) 12'
Substitutions:
FW	12	Juanito		(substituted on) 53'
Manager:
Ladislao Kubala

GK	1	Dino Zoff (c)
RB	7	Claudio Gentile
CB	9	Gaetano Scirea
CB	6	Fulvio Collovati
LB	5	Antonio Cabrini		(substituted off) 56'
CM	14	Gabriele Oriali
CM	15	Marco Tardelli
CM	10	Giancarlo Antognoni
RW	19	Franco Causio
CF	20	Francesco Graziani	(yellow card) 43'
LW	18	Roberto Bettega
Substitutions:
MF	11	Romeo Benetti		(substituted on) 56'
Manager:
Enzo Bearzot

=== Belgium vs Spain ===
15 June 1980
17:45

Belgium	2–1	Spain
Gerets 17'; Cools 65'	Report	Quini 36'

San Siro, Milan
Attendance: 11,430
Referee: Charles Corver (Netherlands)

Belgium	Spain

GK	12	Jean-Marie Pfaff
RB	2	Eric Gerets
CB	3	Luc Millecamps
CB	4	Walter Meeuws
LB	5	Michel Renquin
CM	6	Julien Cools (c)
CM	8	Wilfried Van Moer	(substituted off) 80'
CM	7	René Vandereycken
RW	9	François Van der Elst
CF	10	Erwin Vandenbergh	(substituted off) 81'
LW	11	Jan Ceulemans
Substitutions:
FW	17	Raymond Mommens	(substituted on) 80'
MF	15	René Verheyen	(substituted on) 81'
Manager:
Guy Thys

GK	1	Luis Arconada
RB	20	Miguel Tendillo		(substituted off) 79'
CB	2	José Ramón Alexanko
CB	3	Migueli	(yellow card) 29'
LB	14	Rafael Gordillo
CM	21	Jesús María Zamora
CM	6	Juan Manuel Asensi (c)	Booked	(substituted off) 37'
CM	12	Juanito
RW	18	Enrique Saura
CF	17	Jesús María Satrústegui
LW	10	Quini
Substitutions:
MF	11	Vicente del Bosque		(substituted on) 37'
MF	9	Lobo Carrasco		(substituted on) 79'
Manager:
Ladislao Kubala

=== England vs Italy ===
15 June 1980
20:30

England	0–1	Italy
	Report	Tardelli 79'

Stadio Comunale, Turin
Attendance: 59,649
Referee: Nicolae Rainea (Romania)

England	Italy

GK	13	Peter Shilton
RB	2	Phil Neal
CB	4	Phil Thompson
CB	5	Dave Watson
LB	3	Kenny Sansom
CM	6	Ray Wilkins
CM	7	Kevin Keegan (c)
CM	18	Ray Kennedy
RW	8	Steve Coppell
CF	21	Garry Birtles	(substituted off) 75'
LW	11	Tony Woodcock
Substitutions:
FW	20	Paul Mariner	(substituted on) 75'
Manager:
Ron Greenwood

GK	1	Dino Zoff (c)
RB	7	Claudio Gentile
CB	9	Gaetano Scirea
CB	6	Fulvio Collovati
LB	14	Gabriele Oriali
CM	11	Romeo Benetti	(yellow card) 51'
CM	10	Giancarlo Antognoni
CM	15	Marco Tardelli	(yellow card) 76'
RW	19	Franco Causio		(substituted off) 88'
CF	20	Francesco Graziani
LW	18	Roberto Bettega
Substitutions:
MF	3	Giuseppe Baresi		(substituted on) 88'
Manager:
Enzo Bearzot

=== Spain vs England ===
18 June 1980
17:45

Spain	1–2	England
Dani 48' (pen.)	Report	Brooking 19'; Woodcock 61'

Stadio San Paolo, Naples
Attendance: 14,440
Referee: Erich Linemayr (Austria)

Spain	England

GK	1	Luis Arconada
RB	14	Rafael Gordillo
CB	2	José Ramón Alexanko
CB	15	Antonio Olmo
LB	19	Cundi
RM	5	Francisco Javier Uría
CM	8	Julio Cardeñosa		(substituted off) 46'
CM	18	Enrique Saura
LM	21	Jesús María Zamora
CF	12	Juanito		(substituted off) 46'
CF	16	Santillana (c)
Substitutions:
FW	7	Dani		(substituted on) 46'
MF	9	Lobo Carrasco	(yellow card) 65'	(substituted on) 46'
Manager:
Ladislao Kubala

GK	1	Ray Clemence
RB	12	Viv Anderson		(substituted off) 86'
CB	4	Phil Thompson
CB	5	Dave Watson
LB	16	Mick Mills
RM	6	Ray Wilkins
CM	19	Glenn Hoddle		(substituted off) 77'
CM	17	Terry McDermott	(yellow card) 65'
LM	10	Trevor Brooking
CF	7	Kevin Keegan (c)
CF	11	Tony Woodcock
Substitutions:
FW	20	Paul Mariner		(substituted on) 77'
MF	14	Trevor Cherry		(substituted on) 86'
Manager:
Ron Greenwood

=== Italy vs Belgium ===
18 June 1980
20:30

Italy	0–0	Belgium
	Report

Stadio Olimpico, Rome
Attendance: 42,318
Referee: António Garrido (Portugal)

Italy	Belgium

GK	1	Dino Zoff (c)
RB	14	Gabriele Oriali	(yellow card) 45'	(substituted off) 46'
CB	9	Gaetano Scirea
CB	6	Fulvio Collovati
LB	7	Claudio Gentile
CM	15	Marco Tardelli
CM	11	Romeo Benetti
AM	10	Giancarlo Antognoni		(substituted off) 35'
RW	19	Franco Causio	(yellow card) 75'
CF	20	Francesco Graziani
LW	18	Roberto Bettega
Substitutions:
MF	3	Giuseppe Baresi		(substituted on) 35'
FW	17	Alessandro Altobelli		(substituted on) 46'
Manager:
Enzo Bearzot

GK	12	Jean-Marie Pfaff
RB	2	Eric Gerets
CB	3	Luc Millecamps
CB	4	Walter Meeuws	(yellow card) 20'
LB	5	Michel Renquin
RM	6	Julien Cools (c)
CM	8	Wilfried Van Moer		(substituted off) 48'
CM	7	René Vandereycken	(yellow card) 40'
LM	17	Raymond Mommens		(substituted off) 77'
CF	9	François Van der Elst	(yellow card) 80'
CF	11	Jan Ceulemans
Substitutions:
MF	15	René Verheyen		(substituted on) 48'
FW	10	Erwin Vandenbergh		(substituted on) 77'
Manager:
Guy Thys

== See also ==
- Belgium at the UEFA European Championship
- England at the UEFA European Championship
- Italy at the UEFA European Championship
- Spain at the UEFA European Championship
