= UEFA Euro 1980 =

European football competition

1980 UEFA European Football Championship
Italia 1980 Campionato Europeo di Calcio 1980 (in Italian)

Tournament details
- Host country: Italy
- Dates: 11–22 June 1980
- Teams: 8
- Venues: 4 (in 4 host cities)

Final positions
- Champions: West Germany (2nd title)
- Runners-up: Belgium
- Third place: Czechoslovakia
- Fourth place: Italy

Tournament statistics
- Matches played: 14
- Goals scored: 27 (1.93 per match)
- Attendance: 345,463 (24,676 per match)
- Top scorer: (West Germany) Klaus Allofs (3 goals)
- Best player: (West Germany) Karl-Heinz Rummenigge

The 1980 UEFA European Football Championship finals tournament was held in Italy. This was the sixth UEFA European Championship, which is held every four years and endorsed by UEFA. It was the first European Championship to feature eight teams in the finals, which took place between 11 and 22 June 1980. West Germany won the final 2–1 against Belgium for their second title. This was the last European Championship with a third place play-off.

== Bid process ==
This was the first European Championship in which eight teams, rather than four, contested the finals tournament. On 17 October 1977 UEFA announced that England, Greece, Italy, Netherlands, Switzerland and West Germany had expressed interest in hosting this event. On 19 October UEFA's Organising Committee decided to assign the hosting to England or Italy (expressing its favour to the latter, the former having already hosted the FIFA World Cup just 14 years earlier), and on 12 November the Organising Committee and the Executive Committee announced that Italy had been chosen unanimously. Seven countries had to qualify for the finals, and the draw for the qualifying round took place in Rome on 30 November 1977. Also for the first time, the hosts, in this case Italy, qualified automatically for the finals.

== Overview ==
Because of the expanded format, the finals tournament went through some changes as well. Two groups of four teams each were created; each team would play all others within their group. The winners of the groups would qualify directly for the final (there were no semi-finals), while the runners-up contested the third place play-off.

The tournament failed to draw much enthusiasm from spectators and TV viewers. Attendance was generally poor except for matches involving the Italian team. The tournament format, which required a team to win their group in order to progress to the final, led to a succession of dull, defensive matches. Hooliganism, already a rising problem in the 1970s, made headlines again at the first-round match between England and Belgium where riot police had to use tear gas, causing the match to be held up for five minutes in the first half. The only bright spots were the emergence of a new generation of talented German stars such as Bernd Schuster, Hans-Peter Briegel, Horst Hrubesch, Hansi Müller and Karl-Heinz Rummenigge, and the inspirational performance of Belgium (around rising stars such as Jan Ceulemans, Eric Gerets, Jean-Marie Pfaff, and Erwin Vandenbergh) who reached the final, only losing to West Germany (2–1) by a Hrubesch goal two minutes before time.

== Qualification ==
Greece made their major tournament debut. Spain and Italy made their first appearances since their wins in 1964 and 1968, respectively. England also qualified for the first time since 1968. Belgium qualified after missing the 1976 tournament. Yugoslavia did not qualify after hosting the previous tournament. Other notable absentees were the USSR, France, and Hungary. This was the last time until 2008 that Denmark failed to qualify.

=== Qualified teams ===
Team	Qualified as	Qualified on	Previous appearances in tournament (Note: Bold indicates champion for that year. Italic indicates host for that year.)
Italy	Host	12 November 1977	1 (**1968**)
Greece	Group 6 winner	31 October 1979	0 (debut)
England	Group 1 winner	21 November 1979	1 (1968)
Netherlands	Group 4 winner	21 November 1979	1 (1976)
Czechoslovakia	Group 5 winner	24 November 1979	2 (1960, **1976**)
Spain	Group 3 winner	9 December 1979	1 (**1964**)
Belgium	Group 2 winner	19 December 1979	1 (1972)
West Germany	Group 7 winner	22 December 1979	2 (**1972**, 1976)

Group 1 West Germany Netherlands Czechoslovakia Greece	Group 2 Italy England Spain Belgium

== Venues ==
UEFA Euro 1980 is located in Italy	Rome	Milan
UEFA Euro 1980 is located in Italy	Stadio Olimpico	San Siro
UEFA Euro 1980 is located in Italy	Capacity: 66,341	Capacity: 83,141
UEFA Euro 1980 is located in Italy	Naples	Turin
UEFA Euro 1980 is located in Italy	Stadio San Paolo	Stadio Comunale
UEFA Euro 1980 is located in Italy	Capacity: 81,101	Capacity: 71,180

== Squads ==
Each national team had to submit a squad of 22 players.

== Match officials ==
Referee
Erich Linemayr (AUT)
Adolf Prokop (GDR)
Pat Partridge (ENG)
Robert Wurtz (FRA)
Heinz Aldinger (FRG)
Károly Palotai (HUN)
Alberto Michelotti (ITA)
Charles Corver (NED)
António Garrido (POR)
Nicolae Rainea (ROU)
Brian McGinlay (SCO)
Hilmi Ok (TUR)

== Group stage ==
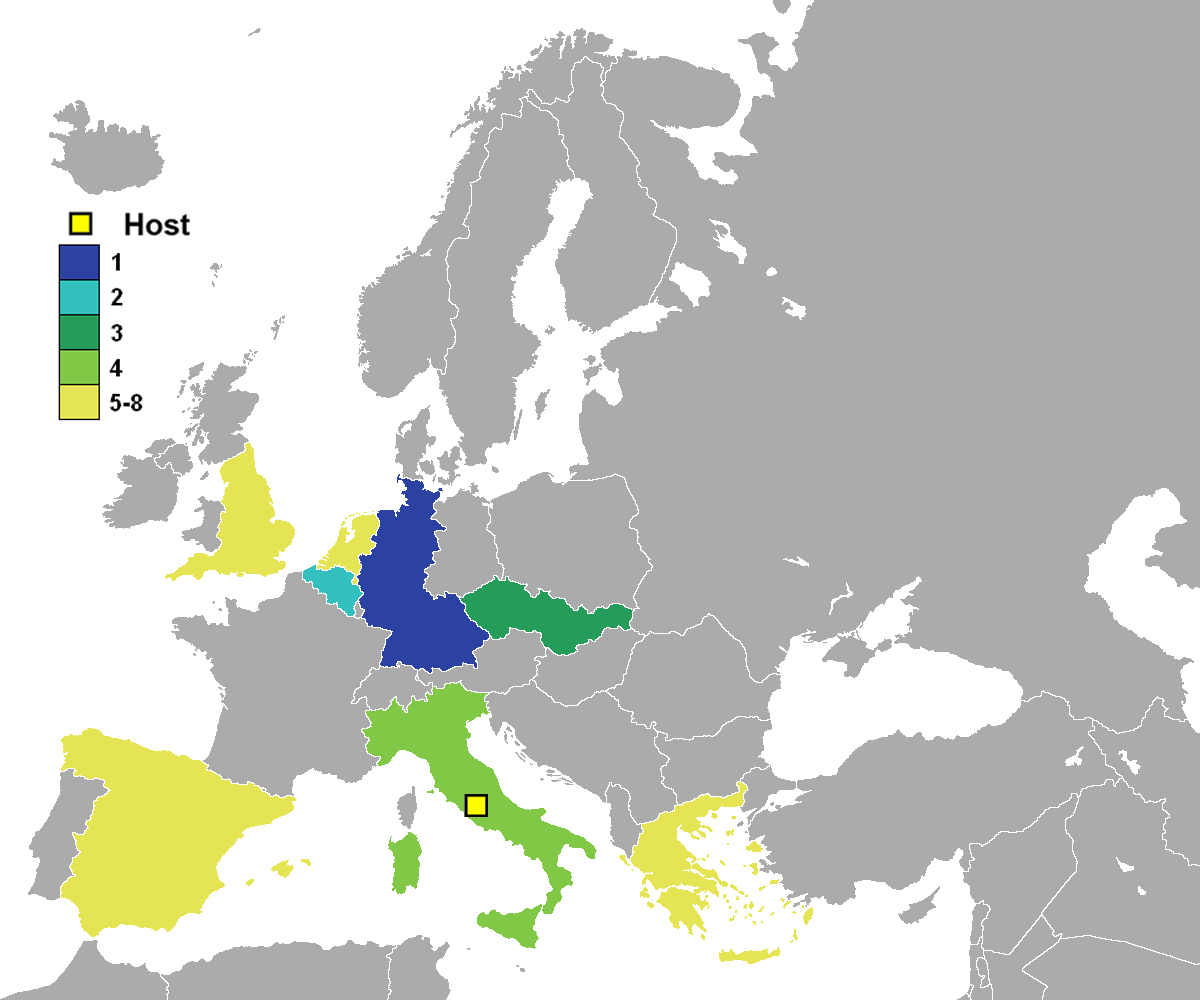
UEFA Euro 1980 Finalists and their result

The teams finishing in the top position in each of the two groups progress to the finals, while the second placed teams advanced to the third place play-off, and bottom two teams were eliminated from the tournament.

All times are local, CEST (UTC+2).

=== Tiebreakers ===
If two or more teams finished level on points after completion of the group matches, the following tie-breakers were used to determine the final ranking:

1. Goal difference in all group matches
2. Greater number of goals scored in all group matches
3. Drawing of lots

=== Group 1 ===
Pos	Team	Pld	W	D	L	GF	GA	GD	Pts	Qualification
1	West Germany	3	2	1	0	4	2	+2	5	Advance to final
2	Czechoslovakia	3	1	1	1	4	3	+1	3	Advance to third place play-off
3	Netherlands	3	1	1	1	4	4	0	3	
4	Greece	3	0	1	2	1	4	−3	1	

Source: UEFA
11 June 1980
17:45

Czechoslovakia	0–1	West Germany
	Report	Rummenigge 57'

Stadio Olimpico, Rome
Attendance: 10,500
Referee: Alberto Michelotti (Italy)
11 June 1980
20:30

Netherlands	1–0	Greece
Kist 65' (pen.)	Report

Stadio San Paolo, Naples
Attendance: 14,990
Referee: Adolf Prokop (East Germany)

14 June 1980
17:45

West Germany	3–2	Netherlands
Allofs 20', 60', 65'	Report	Rep 79' (pen.); W. van de Kerkhof 85'

Stadio San Paolo, Naples
Attendance: 29,889
Referee: Robert Wurtz (France)
14 June 1980
20:30

Greece	1–3	Czechoslovakia
Anastopoulos 14'	Report	Panenka 6'; Vízek 26'; Nehoda 63'

Stadio Olimpico, Rome
Attendance: 7,614
Referee: Pat Partridge (England)

17 June 1980
17:45

Netherlands	1–1	Czechoslovakia
Kist 59'	Report	Nehoda 16'

San Siro, Milan
Attendance: 11,889
Referee: Hilmi Ok (Turkey)
17 June 1980
20:30

Greece	0–0	West Germany
	Report

Stadio Comunale, Turin
Attendance: 13,901
Referee: Brian McGinlay (Scotland)

=== Group 2 ===
Pos	Team	Pld	W	D	L	GF	GA	GD	Pts	Qualification
1	Belgium	3	1	2	0	3	2	+1	4	Advance to final
2	Italy (H)	3	1	2	0	1	0	+1	4	Advance to third place play-off
3	England	3	1	1	1	3	3	0	3	
4	Spain	3	0	1	2	2	4	−2	1	

Source: UEFA
(H) Hosts
12 June 1980
17:45

Belgium	1–1	England
Ceulemans 29'	Report	Wilkins 26'

Stadio Comunale, Turin
Attendance: 15,186
Referee: Heinz Aldinger (West Germany)
12 June 1980
20:30

Spain	0–0	Italy
	Report

San Siro, Milan
Attendance: 46,337
Referee: Károly Palotai (Hungary)

15 June 1980
17:45

Belgium	2–1	Spain
Gerets 17'; Cools 65'	Report	Quini 36'

San Siro, Milan
Attendance: 11,430
Referee: Charles Corver (Netherlands)
15 June 1980
20:30

England	0–1	Italy
	Report	Tardelli 79'

Stadio Comunale, Turin
Attendance: 59,649
Referee: Nicolae Rainea (Romania)

18 June 1980
17:45

Spain	1–2	England
Dani 48' (pen.)	Report	Brooking 19'; Woodcock 61'

Stadio San Paolo, Naples
Attendance: 14,440
Referee: Erich Linemayr (Austria)
18 June 1980
20:30

Italy	0–0	Belgium
	Report

Stadio Olimpico, Rome
Attendance: 42,318
Referee: António Garrido (Portugal)

== Knockout stage ==
In the final, extra time and a penalty shoot-out were used to decide the winner if necessary. However, the third place play-off would go straight to a penalty shoot-out if the scores were level after 90 minutes.

All times are local, CEST (UTC+2).

=== Bracket ===
Final
22 June – Rome
Belgium	1
West Germany	2
Third place play-off
21 June – Naples
Czechoslovakia (p)	1 (9)
Italy	1 (8)

=== Third place play-off ===
21 June 1980
20:30

Czechoslovakia	1–1	Italy
Jurkemik 54'	Report	Graziani 73'
Penalties
Masný (penalty scored); Nehoda (penalty scored); Ondruš (penalty scored); Jurkemik (penalty scored); Panenka (penalty scored); Gögh (penalty scored); Gajdůšek (penalty scored); Kozák (penalty scored); Barmoš (penalty scored)	9–8	(penalty scored) Causio; (penalty scored) Altobelli; (penalty scored) G. Baresi; (penalty scored) Cabrini; (penalty scored) Benetti; (penalty scored) Graziani; (penalty scored) Scirea; (penalty scored) Tardelli; (penalty missed) Collovati

Stadio San Paolo, Naples
Attendance: 24,652
Referee: Erich Linemayr (Austria)

=== Final ===
22 June 1980
20:30

Belgium	1–2	West Germany
Vandereycken 75' (pen.)	Report	Hrubesch 10', 88'

Stadio Olimpico, Rome
Attendance: 47,860
Referee: Nicolae Rainea (Romania)

== Statistics ==
=== Goalscorers ===
There were 27 goals scored in 14 matches, for an average of 1.93 goals per match.

3 goals

- (West Germany) Klaus Allofs

2 goals

- (Czechoslovakia) Zdeněk Nehoda
- (Netherlands) Kees Kist
- (West Germany) Horst Hrubesch

1 goal

- (Belgium) Jan Ceulemans
- (Belgium) Julien Cools
- (Belgium) Eric Gerets
- (Belgium) René Vandereycken
- (Czechoslovakia) Ladislav Jurkemik
- (Czechoslovakia) Antonín Panenka
- (Czechoslovakia) Ladislav Vízek
- (England) Trevor Brooking
- (England) Ray Wilkins
- (England) Tony Woodcock
- (Greece) Nikos Anastopoulos
- (Italy) Francesco Graziani
- (Italy) Marco Tardelli
- (Netherlands) Johnny Rep
- (Netherlands) Willy van de Kerkhof
- (Spain) Dani
- (Spain) Quini
- (West Germany) Karl-Heinz Rummenigge

=== Awards ===
==== Team of the Tournament ====
UEFA Team of the Tournament
Goalkeeper	Defenders	Midfielders	Forwards
(Italy) Dino Zoff	(Italy) Claudio Gentile (Italy) Gaetano Scirea (West Germany) Hans-Peter Briegel (West Germany) Karlheinz Förster	(Belgium) Jan Ceulemans (Italy) Marco Tardelli (West Germany) Hansi Müller (West Germany) Bernd Schuster	(West Germany) Horst Hrubesch (West Germany) Karl-Heinz Rummenigge
