= Jaroslav Netolička =

Czech footballer (born 1954)

Personal information
- Date of birth: 3 March 1954 (age 72)
- Place of birth: Opava, Czechoslovakia
- Position: Goalkeeper

Youth career
- –1973: VOKD Poruba

Senior career*
Years	Team	Apps	(Gls)
1973–1982	Dukla Prague	135	(0)
1983–1985	TJ Vítkovice	39	(0)
1985–1986	TSV 1860 München	18	(0)
1986–1988	TJ Vítkovice		
1988–1989	SC Hasselt		
1989–1990	ŽD Bohumín		
1990–1993	Sabah FA		
1993–1994	Slavoj Kovkor Bruntál		

International career
1978–1981	Czechoslovakia	15	(0)

Managerial career
- 1993–1994: Slavoj Kovkor Bruntál
- 1995–1999: FC Karviná
- 1999: Rapid Muglinov
- 2000–2001: FC Biocel Vratimov
- 2001–2003: FK VP Frýdek-Místek
- 2003–2004: FC Vysočina Jihlava
- 2005–2006: SK Dětmarovice
- * Club domestic league appearances and goals

Olympic medal record

Representing Czechoslovakia

Men's Football
Gold medal – first place	1980 Moscow	Team competition

Jaroslav Netolička (born 3 March 1954, in Opava) is a Czech football goalkeeper. He obtained a total number of fifteen caps for Czechoslovakia national football team, in which he conceded ten goals.

Netolička began his playing career with Dukla Prague and TJ Vítkovice.

He was a participant in the 1980 Olympic Games, where Czechoslovakia won the gold medal, and in the 1980 UEFA European Championship, where Czechoslovakia won the bronze medal. He also won three times the Czechoslovak First League with Dukla Prague, in 1977, 1979 and 1982.
