= Jozef Barmoš =

Slovak footballer and coach

Personal information
- Date of birth: 28 August 1954 (age 72)
- Place of birth: Šurany, Czechoslovakia
- Height: 1.75 m (5 ft 9 in)
- Position: Defender

Youth career
- 1960–1970: TJ Družstevník Bešeňov

Senior career*
Years	Team	Apps	(Gls)
1970–1978	Inter Bratislava		
1978–1979	Dukla Prague		
1979–1985	Inter Bratislava		

International career
1977–1982	Czechoslovakia	52	(0)

Managerial career
- 1995–1998: Slovakia (assistant)
- 1997–1998: Slovakia U21
- 1999–2000: Žilina
- 2004–2005: Inter Bratislava
- 2006–2007: Slovakia U20
- 2007–2008: Slovakia U21
- 2009: TJ Malinovo
- 2009–2016: Inter Bratislava
- 2017: Inter Bratislava
Medal record
Representing Czechoslovakia
UEFA European Championship
Winner	1976 Yugoslavia
- * Club domestic league appearances and goals

Jozef Barmoš (born 28 August 1954) is a Slovak former football coach and former player. He played in defence for Czechoslovakia, and won 52 international caps.

Barmoš played club football in Czechoslovakia, making 343 appearances in the Czechoslovak First League between 1973 and 1985 for Inter Bratislava and Dukla Prague. After winning the European Championships in 1976, Barmoš played for Czechoslovakia at both Euro 1980 and Spain 1982. At the latter tournament, he scored an own goal as the Czechoslovaks lost 2–0 to England in Bilbao, during the first round of the competition.

He managed the Slovak U21 national team, Žilina and Inter Bratislava.
