= Nicolae Rainea =

Romanian football referee (1933–2015)

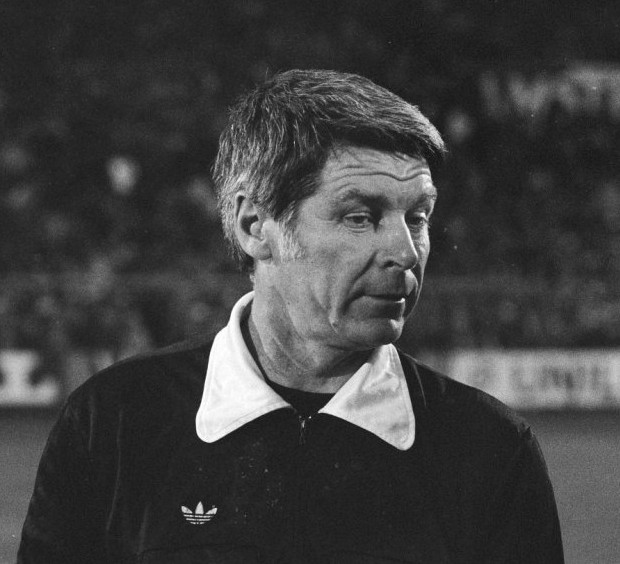
- Rainea in 1980
- Born: 19 November 1933; Brăila, Romania
- Died: 1 April 2015 (aged 81); Galați, Romania
- Other occupation: Technician, footballer

Domestic
Years	League	Role
1964–1984	Liga I	Referee

International
Years	League	Role
1967–1989	FIFA-listed	Referee

Nicolae Rainea (19 November 1933 – 1 April 2015), nicknamed The Locomotive of the Carpathians, was a Romanian football referee and player. Regarded as one of the most important referees in the world of the 1970s and 1980s and, arguably, the most famous Romanian referee of all time.

== Career ==
Nicolae Rainea played football in the lower leagues of Romania for Laminorul Brăila, Metalul Piatra Neamț and Constructorul Bârlad, he retired in 1959 to start his career as a referee, making his debut in Liga I in 1965. He refereed at three FIFA World Cups (1974, 1978, 1982), the UEFA Euro 1980 Final, the 1983 European Cup Final, the second leg of the 1978 European Super Cup and the second leg of the 1978 UEFA Cup Final.

Rainea officiated the Italy v Argentina game at the 1982 World Cup. He was linesman in a later match between France and Northern Ireland.

== Honours and legacy ==
Rainea was decorated by two presidents of Romania, Ion Iliescu and Traian Băsescu. He was made honorary citizen of Galați where he resided and served four local council terms.

Nicolae Rainea Stadium in Galați is named after him.

== Personal life and death ==
In 2011, he celebrated 50 years of marriage. He had a son and a daughter, both living in Sweden.

After an untreated mild cold turned into a pulmonary edema, Rainea suffered a cardiac arrest while in hospital and died on 1 April 2015 in Galați. He was 81 years old.

== Major matches refereed ==
Date	Match	Tournament	Venue	Result	Ref
9 May 1978	PSV vs. Bastia	1978 UEFA Cup final (second leg)	Philips Stadion, Eindhoven	3–0 (3–0 on aggregate)	
19 December 1978	Liverpool vs. Anderlecht	1978 European Super Cup final (second leg)	Anfield, Liverpool	2–1 (3–4 on aggregate)	
22 June 1980	Belgium vs. West Germany	UEFA Euro 1980 final	Stadio Olimpico, Rome	1–2	
25 May 1983	Hamburger SV vs. Juventus	1983 European Cup final	Olympic Stadium, Athens	1–0	

Preceded by (Socialist Federal Republic of Yugoslavia) Dusan Maksimović	1978 UEFA Cup Final (Romania) Nicolae Rainea	Succeeded by (Scotland) Ian Foote
Preceded by (Hungary) Károly Palotai	1978 European Super Cup (Romania) Nicolae Rainea	Succeeded by (East Germany) Adolf Prokop
Preceded by (Italy) Sergio Gonella	1980 UEFA Euro Final (Romania) Nicolae Rainea	Succeeded by (Czechoslovakia) Vojtech Christov
Preceded by (France) Georges Konrath	1983 European Cup Final (Romania) Nicolae Rainea	Succeeded by (Sweden) Erik Fredriksson
