= Horst Hrubesch =

German footballer and manager (born 1951)

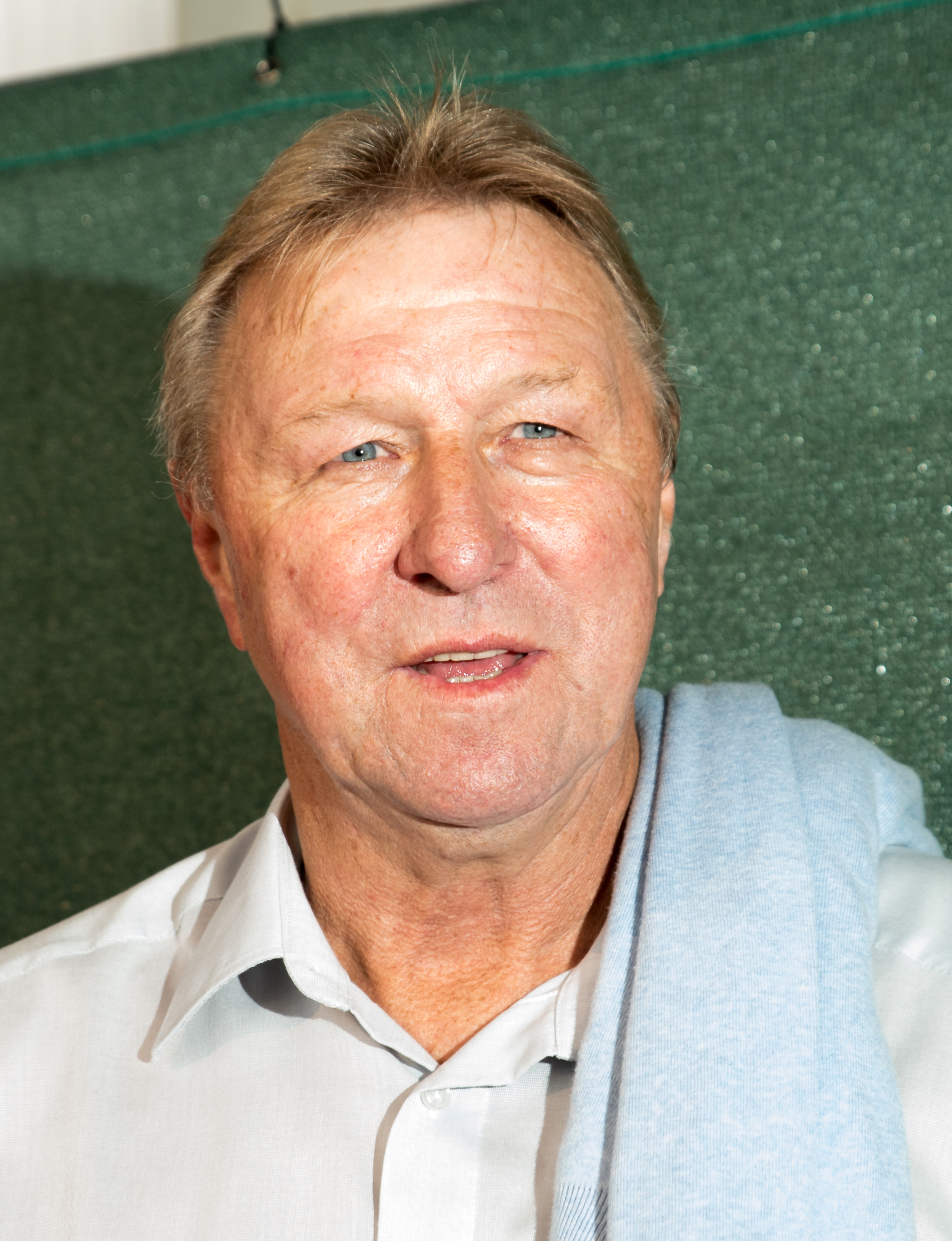
- Hrubesch in 2016

Personal information
- Date of birth: 17 April 1951 (age 75)
- Place of birth: Hamm, West Germany
- Height: 1.88 m (6 ft 2 in)
- Position: Centre forward

Youth career
- 1958–1969: FC Pelkum

Senior career*
Years	Team	Apps	(Gls)
1969–1970	Germania Hamm (de)		
1970–1971	Hammer SpVg		
1971–1975	SC Westtünnen (de)		
1975–1978	Rot-Weiss Essen	83	(80)
1978–1983	Hamburger SV	159	(96)
1983–1985	Standard Liège	43	(17)
1985–1986	Borussia Dortmund	17	(2)
1987–1988	SC Westtünnen		
Total		302	(195)

International career
1980–1982	West Germany	21	(6)

Managerial career
- 1986: FC Pelkum
- 1986–1987: Rot-Weiss Essen
- 1987–1988: SC Westtünnen (player-manager)
- 1988–1989: VfL Wolfsburg
- 1990–1991: Swarovski Tirol (assistant)
- 1992: Swarovski Tirol
- 1993: Hansa Rostock
- 1994–1995: Dynamo Dresden
- 1995–1996: Austria Wien
- 1997: Samsunspor
- 2000: Germany (assistant)
- 2000–2016: Germany youth
- 2016: Germany Olympic
- 2018: Germany women (interim)
- 2021: Hamburger SV (interim)
- 2023–2024: Germany women (interim)
Medal record
Men's football
Representing West Germany (as player)
UEFA European Championship
Winner	1980 Italy
FIFA World Cup
Runner-up	1982 Spain
Representing Germany (as manager)
UEFA European Under-19 Championship
Winner	2008 Czech Republic
UEFA European Under-21 Championship
Winner	2009 Sweden
Olympic Games
Silver medal – second place	2016 Rio de Janeiro	Team
Representing Germany (as manager)
Olympic Games
Bronze medal – third place	2024 Paris	Team
UEFA Women's Nations League
Third place	2024
- * Club domestic league appearances and goals

Horst Hrubesch (German: [ˈhɔʁst ˈʁuːbɛʃ]; born 17 April 1951) is a German professional football manager and former player who last managed the Germany women's national team. As a player, Hrubesch won three West German championships with his club side, Hamburger SV, as well as the European Cup title in 1983. He was a key member of the West Germany team that won the 1980 European Championship and made it to the final of the 1982 World Cup, losing to Italy. His nickname was Das Kopfball-Ungeheuer (the Header Beast) for his heading skills as a centre forward.

== Club career ==
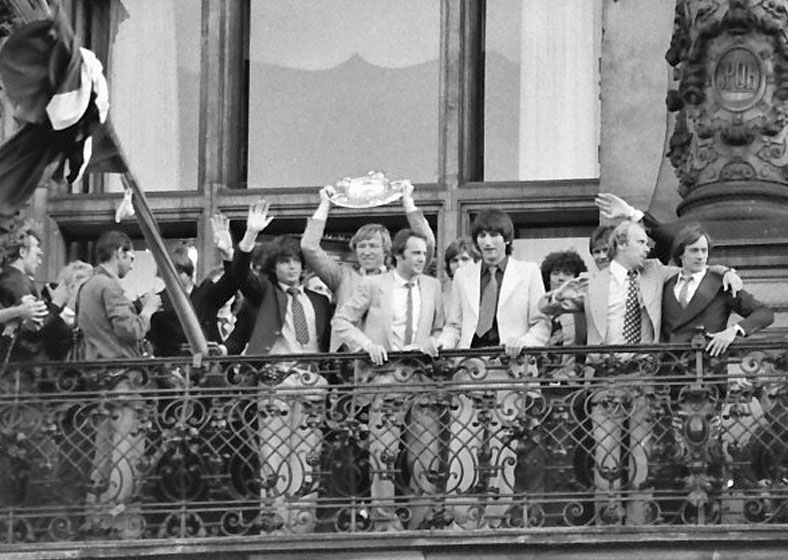
Hrubesch lifts the Bundesliga trophy during Hamburg's title celebration parade in 1979

Hrubesch played in small clubs until the age of 24 when he was signed by Rot-Weiss Essen. There, he played well enough that in 1978 Hamburger SV (HSV) bought him. At Hamburg he blossomed into one of the most productive forwards of the Bundesliga and was soon called up for the West German national team. Hrubesch formed an attacking partnership with fellow HSV player Manfred Kaltz, a right wingback whose crosses Hrubesch often headed in, or headed to teammates to provide them with scoring chances. Hrubesch won the West German championship three times with Hamburg, in 1979, 1982 and 1983; and his team finished second in the league standings twice, in 1980 and 1981. In all, he scored 96 goals in 159 matches for the club.

Hrubesch won the European Cup in 1983, captaining the team to a 1–0 win against favourites Juventus in the final in Athens. Three years earlier he had been on the team that lost the 1980 European Cup Final against Nottingham Forest, however he was injured shortly before the game and could only feature as a half time substitute. Hamburg reached one other major European final while Hrubesch was on the team, losing the 1982 UEFA Cup final against IFK Göteborg.

Hrubesch left Hamburg after the 1983 season to play for Belgian club Standard Liège. After two years he returned to the Bundesliga to play for Borussia Dortmund, appearing in about half the club's games during his one season there. Over the course of his entire career he scored 136 goals in 224 games in the Bundesliga.

== International career ==
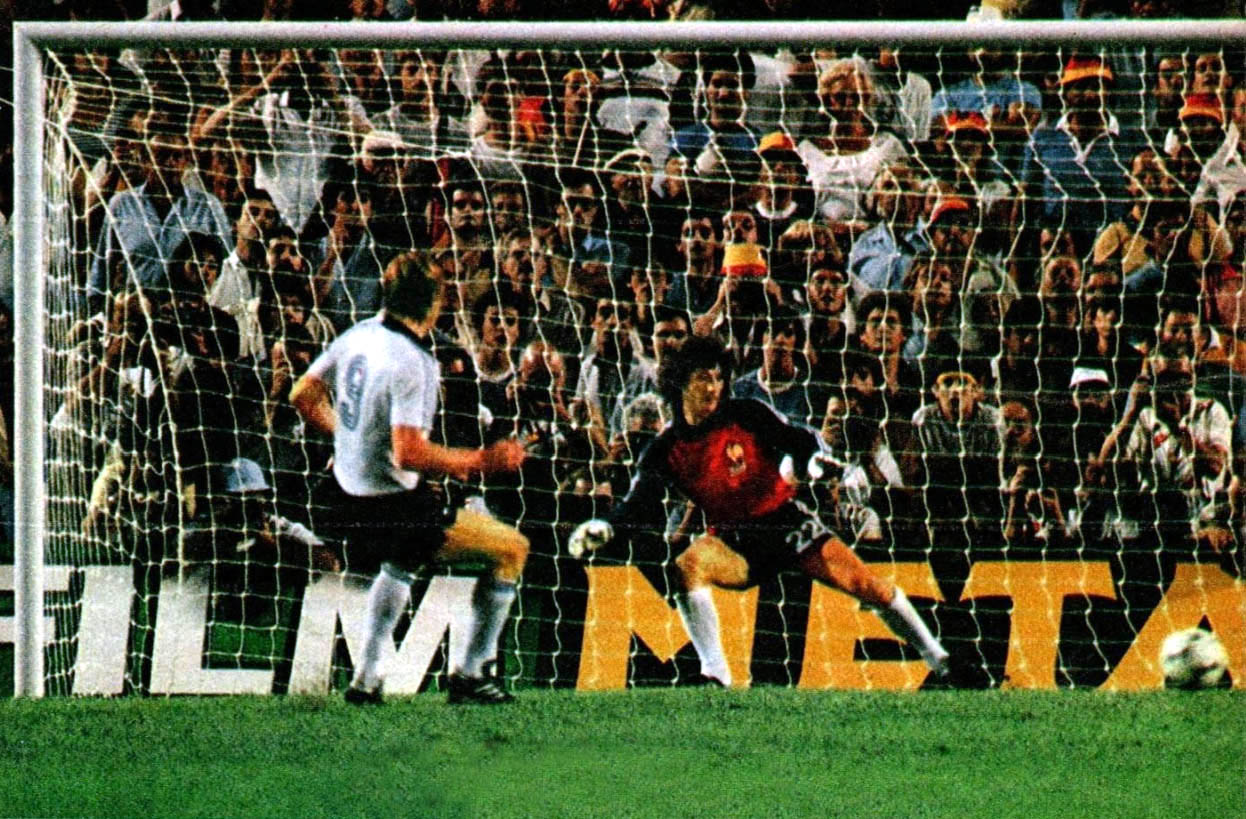
Hrubesch scoring the decisive penalty in the 1982 World Cup semifinal against France, helping West Germany win 5–4 on penalties and advance to the final

West Germany's match-winning hero in the UEFA Euro 1980 final in Rome against Belgium, Hrubesch scored two goals, the second a trademark bullet header, in the 89th minute. It was a day of redemption for the big Hamburger SV centre forward who a few weeks earlier had hobbled around the field with an ankle injury as his club lost the European Cup final to Nottingham Forest. A latecomer to the international scene, Hrubesch had only been called into the West Germany squad after Klaus Fischer broke his leg, and the game against Belgium was only his fifth international appearance. He would play for West Germany 21 times, scoring six goals, his last match being the losing 1982 FIFA World Cup final against Italy.

Hrubesch is also famous for having scored the only goal in the Disgrace of Gijón victory against Austria, and the winning penalty which defeated France in the 1982 FIFA World Cup semi-final, after an epic game which was tied 3–3 after extra-time. Minutes earlier, in the second extra-time period with France leading 3–2, it was Hrubesch who headed a cross from the left wing to Fischer, enabling his spectacular overhead kick equalizer. Irish television commentator Jimmy Magee during the shoot-out coined the nickname that made Hrubesch best known in the English-speaking world: "The man they call 'The Monster'."

== Coaching career ==
=== Club football ===
Hrubesch started his coaching career with Rot-Weiss Essen He was there between 1 July 1986 and 14 September 1987. His first match was a 2–0 loss against Rot-Weiß Oberhausen on 25 July 1986. He had won two of nine league matches and a first round exit from the cup before leaving the club. His final match was a 3–1 loss to Rot-Weiß Oberhausen on 13 September 1987. He won 16 of his 47 league matches. Hrubesch then took over VfL Wolfsburg for the 1988–89 season. In the cup, he had a draw and a loss. This includes a 1–1 draw and a 6–1 loss against to Eintracht Frankfurt. Hrubesch then took over Swarovski Tirol from 1 January 1992 to 30 June 1992. His first match was a 2–0 win against Austria Salzburg. Hrubesch took over at Hansa Rostock between 4 January 1993 and 26 June 1993. His first match was a 3–0 loss to Waldhof Mannheim on 6 February 1993. Hrubesch took over as head coach of Dynamo Dresden on 22 November 1994 and was there until 1 March 1995. He failed to win any of his five matches. His first match was a 1–1 draw against Karlsruher SC on 26 November 1994. Dynamo Dresden also lost a 2–1 to Bayern Munich, 1–1 draw against Bayer Leverkusen, 1–0 loss to Werder Bremen, and a 2–0 loss to VfL Bochum. Hrubesch was head coach of Austria Wien for the 1995–96 season. His first match was a 4–0 win against Vorwärts Steyr on 2 August 1995. Hrubesch was head coach of Samsunspor for the 1997–98 season. Samsunspor finished second in Group 6 of the UEFA Intertoto Cup, three points behind Hamburger SV. Their record was three wins and a loss. In the league, they finished with a record of 14 wins, seven draws, and 13 losses in 34 matches.

On 3 May 2021, Hrubesch was appointed as manager of Hamburger SV for the last three matches of the 2020–21 2. Bundesliga season.

=== International ===
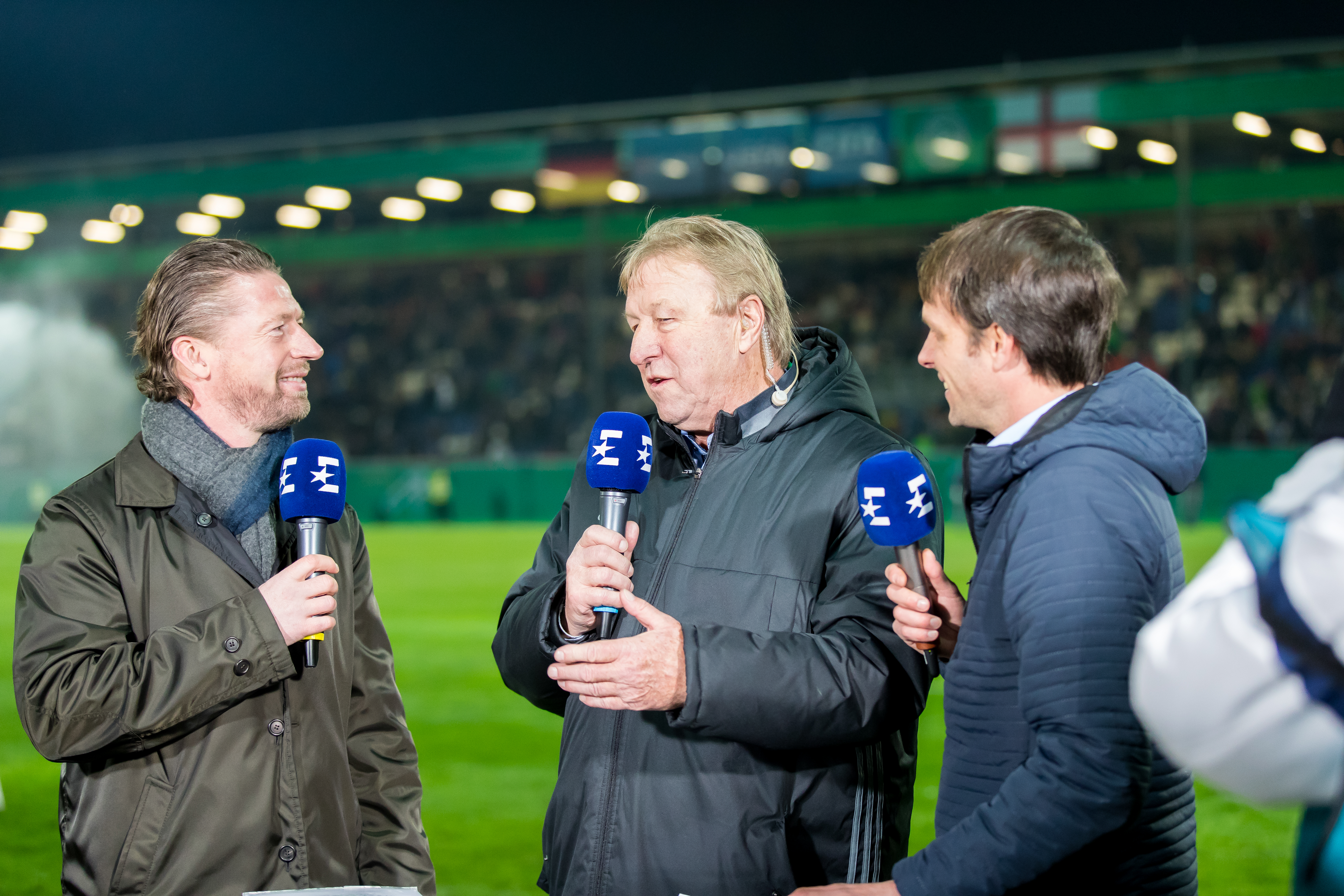
Steffen Freund (left) and Hrubesch (center) in discussion on Eurosport at the under-21 football international between England and Germany in 2017

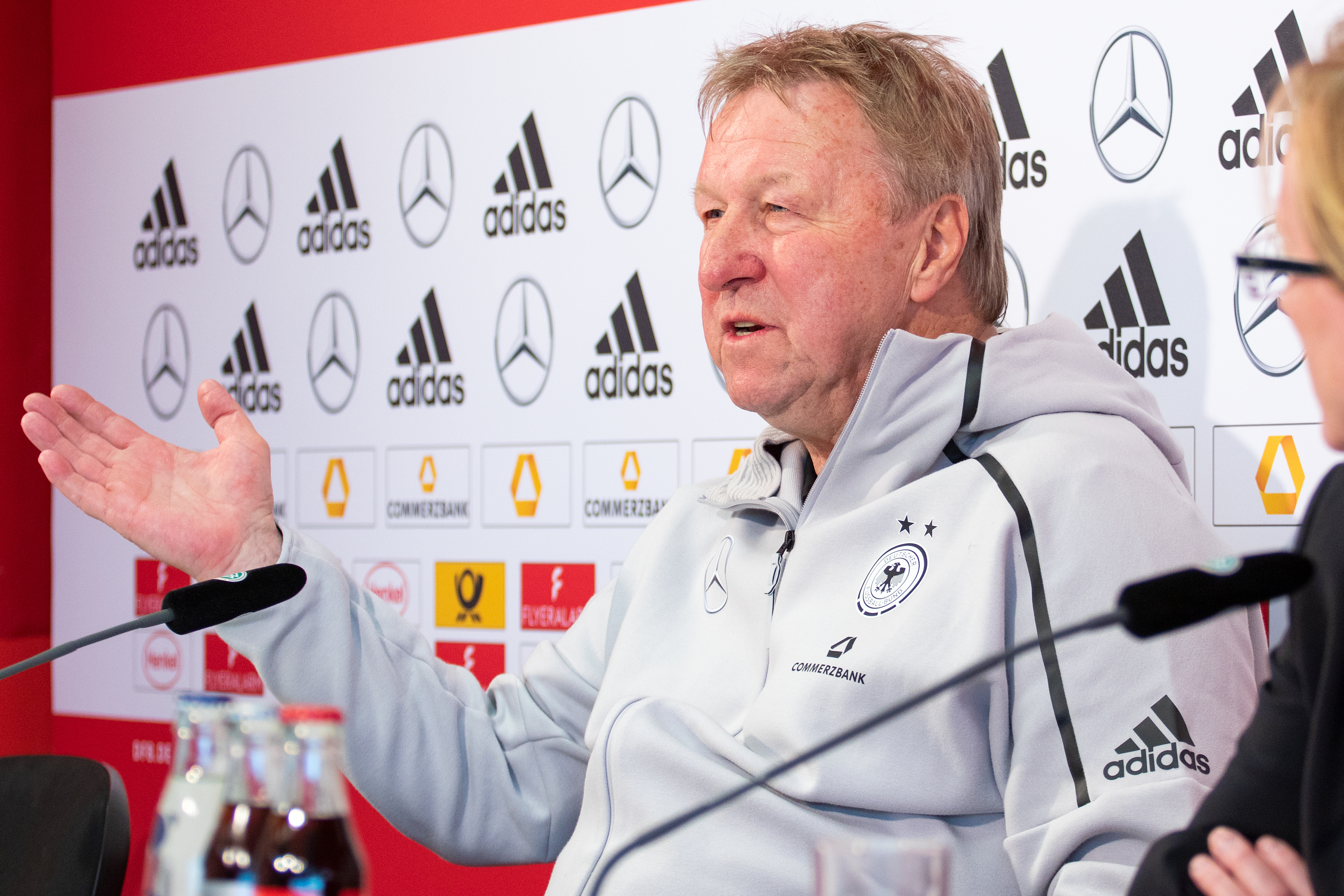
Hrubesch as the coach of the German woman's national team, 2018

Hrubesch was head coach of Germany's B team from 22 March 1999. He was appointed assistant coach of Germany's A team on 8 May 2000. The coaching staff was reconstructed on 26 March 2002 with Uli Stielike becoming the new head coach of Germany's B team. In 2008, Hrubesch won the European Championship with the Germany U–19 team. On 9 January 2009, Hrubesch was named interim coach of the Germany U–21 team. Rainer Adrion was unavailable to become the permanent head coach until the summer. In June 2009, he guided Germany to the final of the 2009 UEFA European Under-21 Championship where they defeated England Under 21s by 4–0. On 11 November 2009, it was announced that he will begin to work as U-19 coach of the DFB. He returned to the Germany U–21 team after Rainer Adrion was sacked on 21 June 2013.

At the 2016 Summer Olympics, he was the coach when Germany won the silver medal.

On 13 March 2018, he was appointed as the head coach for the Germany women's national team. He took over the same role again in 2023, as an interim coach for Martina Voss-Tecklenburg, who was out with an illness and eventually sacked.

== Career statistics ==
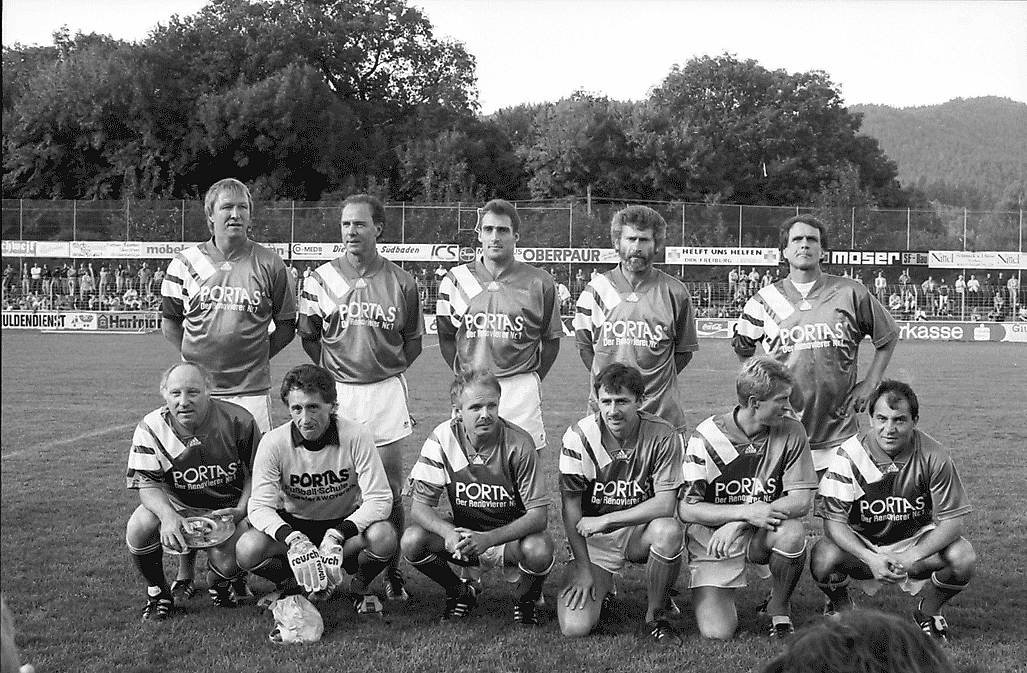
Hrubesch (first from left, back row) with Beckenbauer, Breitner, Seeler, Allofs and Magath at an All-Star game in Freiburg, 1993

=== Club ===
Appearances and goals by club, season and competition
Club	Season	League			DFB-Pokal		Europe		Total	
Club	Season	Division	Apps	Goals	Apps	Goals	Apps	Goals	Apps	Goals
Rot-Weiss Essen	1975–76	Bundesliga	22	18			—		22	18
Rot-Weiss Essen	1976–77	Bundesliga	26	20			—		26	20
Rot-Weiss Essen	1977–78	2. Bundesliga	35	42			—		35	42
Rot-Weiss Essen	Total		83	80			—		83	80
Hamburger SV	1978–79	Bundesliga	34	13	1	0	—		35	13
Hamburger SV	1979–80	Bundesliga	34	21	3	3	9 (Note: Appearances in European Cup)	7	46	31
Hamburger SV	1980–81	Bundesliga	29	17	5	7	6 (Note: Appearances in UEFA Cup)	7	40	31
Hamburger SV	1981–82	Bundesliga	32	27	6	5	11	5	49	37
Hamburger SV	1982–83	Bundesliga	30	18	4	2	8	2	42	22
Hamburger SV	Total		159	96	19	17	34	21	212	134
Standard Liège	1983–84	Belgian First Division	23	9			2	1	25	10
Standard Liège	1984–85	Belgian First Division	20	8			0	0	20	8
Standard Liège	Total		43	17			2	1	45	18
Borussia Dortmund	1985–86	Bundesliga	17	2			—		17	2
Career total			302	195	19	17	36	22	357	234

=== International ===
Scores and results list West Germany's goal tally first, score column indicates score after each Hrubesch goal.

List of international goals scored by Horst Hrubesch
No.	Date	Venue	Opponent	Score	Result	Competition
1	22 June 1980	Stadio Olimpico, Rome, Italy	Belgium	1–0	2–1	UEFA Euro 1980
2	22 June 1980	Stadio Olimpico, Rome, Italy	Belgium	2–1	2–1	UEFA Euro 1980
3	11 October 1980	Eindhoven, Netherlands	Netherlands	1–1	1–1	Friendly
4	19 November 1980	Niedersachsenstadion, Hanover, West Germany	France	3–1	4–1	Friendly
5	1 January 1981	Estadio Centenario, Montevideo, Uruguay	Argentina	1–0	1–2	1980 World Champions' Gold Cup
6	25 June 1982	El Molinón, Gijón, Spain	Austria	1–0	1–0	1982 FIFA World Cup

== Managerial statistics ==
As of 6 August 2024

Team	From	To	Record								
Team	From	To	M	W	D	L	GF	GA	GD	Win %	Ref.
Rot-Weiss Essen	1 July 1986	14 September 1987	48	16	12	20	77	84	−7	33.33	
VfL Wolfsburg	1 July 1988	30 June 1989	2	0	1	1	2	7	−5	0.00	
Swarovski Tirol	1 January 1992	30 June 1992	14	9	0	5	21	15	+6	64.29	
Hansa Rostock	4 January 1993	26 June 1993	21	7	4	10	21	29	−8	33.33	
Dynamo Dresden	22 November 1994	1 March 1995	5	0	2	3	3	7	−4	0.00	
Austria Wien	1 July 1995	1 June 1996	41	16	9	16	52	40	+12	39.02	
Samsunspor	21 June 1997	30 June 1998	38	17	7	14	49	45	+4	44.74	
Germany women national team (interim)	13 March 2018	30 November 2018	8	7	1	0	29	5	+24	87.50	
Hamburger SV	3 May 2021	30 June 2021	3	2	0	1	11	5	+6	66.67	
Germany women national team (interim)	7 October 2023	9 August 2024	17	11	2	4	38	17	+21	64.71	
Total			197	85	38	74	303	255	+48	43.15	—

== Honours ==
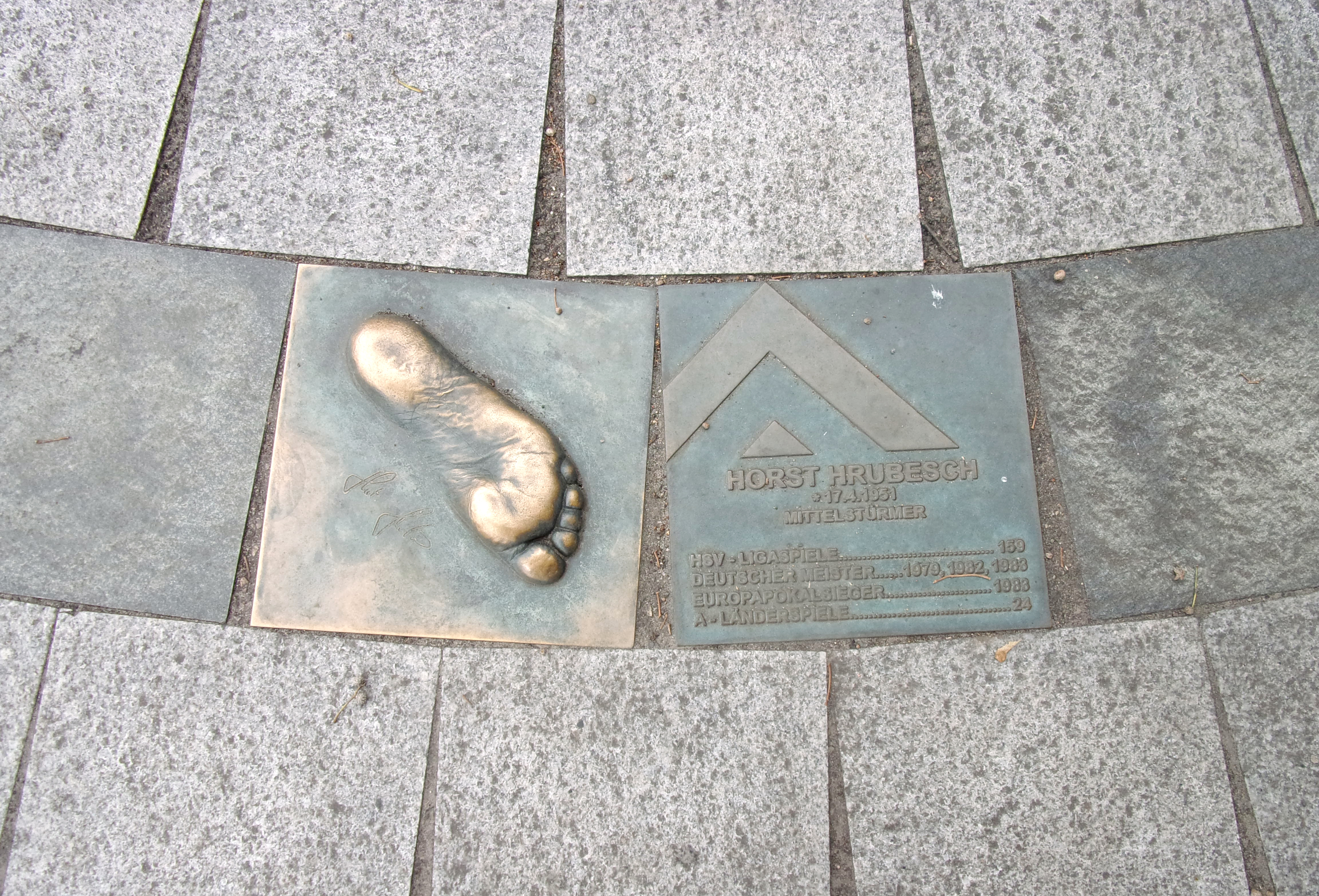
Hrubesch, featured on the HSV Walk of Fame outside the Volksparkstadion in Hamburg

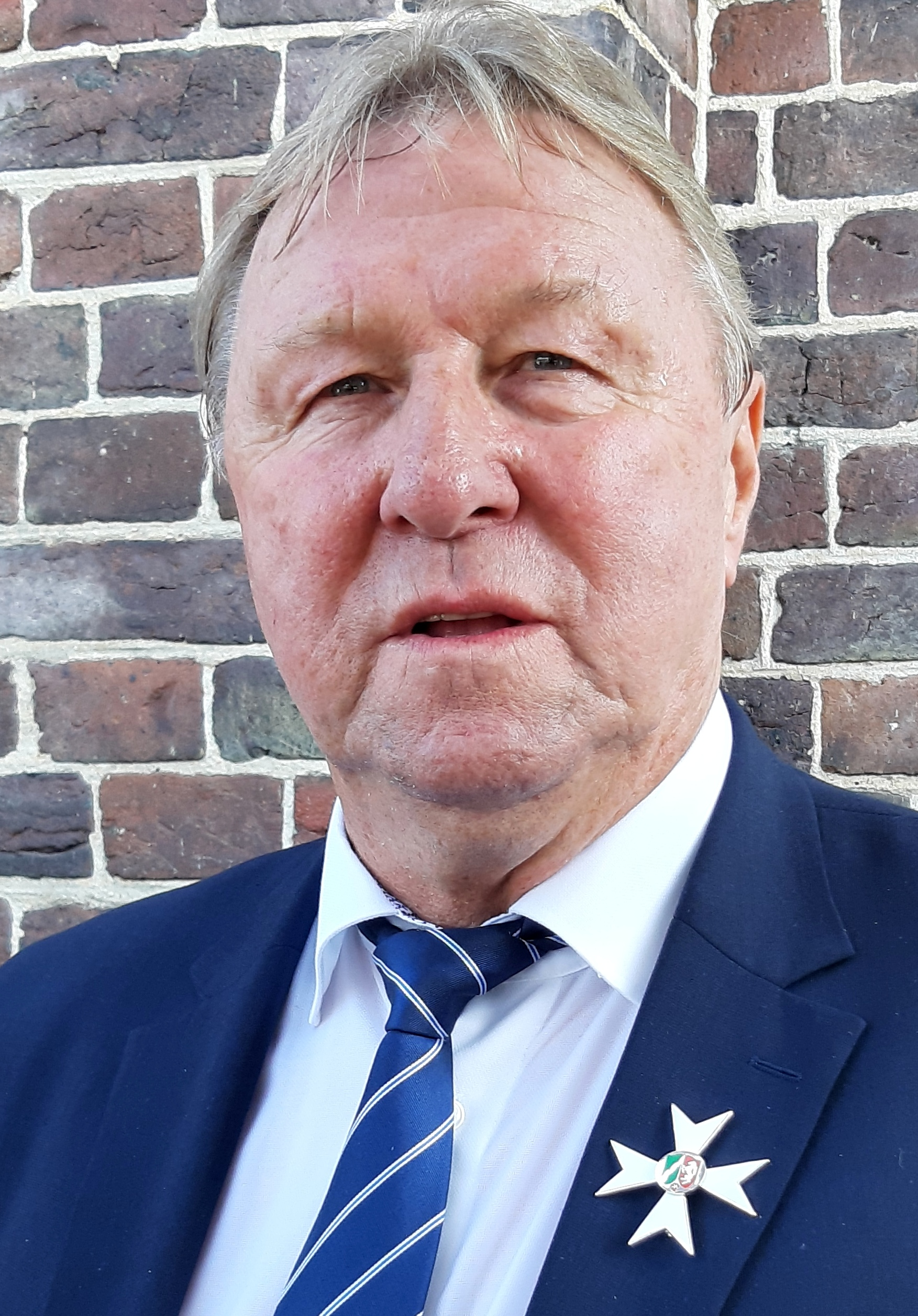
Hrubesch honored with the Order of Merit of North Rhine-Westphalia in 2019

=== As a player ===
Hamburger SV

- Bundesliga: 1978–79, 1981–82, 1982–83
- European Cup: 1982–83, runner-up: 1979–80

West Germany

- UEFA European Championship: 1980
- FIFA World Cup runner-up: 1982

Individual

- Sport Ideal European XI: 1980
- UEFA European Championship Team of the Tournament: 1980
- Onze de Bronze: 1980
- Onze Mondial: 1980, 1983
- Guerin Sportivo All-Star Team: 1980
- Bundesliga Torschützenkönig: 1981–82

=== As a coach ===
Germany U19

- UEFA European Under-19 Championship: 2008

Germany U21

- UEFA European Under-21 Championship: 2009

Germany U23

- Summer Olympics silver medal: 2016

Germany Women

- UEFA Women's Nations League third place: 2023–24
- Summer Olympics bronze medal: 2024

Orders

- Order of Merit of North Rhine-Westphalia: 2019
