= René Vandereycken =

Belgian football player and manager

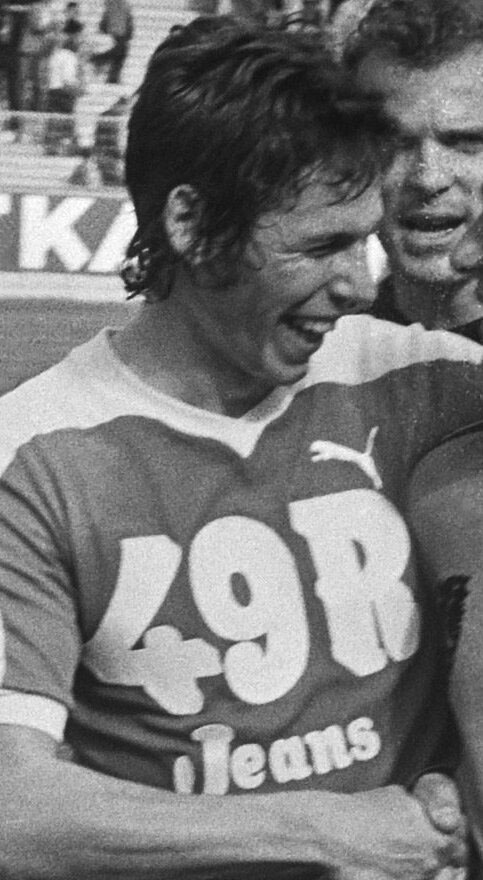
- Vandereycken in 1978

Personal information
- Date of birth: 22 July 1953 (age 73)
- Place of birth: Spalbeek, Belgium
- Height: 1.83 m (6 ft 0 in)
- Position: Midfielder

Senior career*
Years	Team	Apps	(Gls)
1971–1974	KSC Hasselt		
1974–1981	Club Brugge	233	(63)
1981–1983	Genoa	28	(0)
1983–1986	Anderlecht	94	(13)
1986–1987	Blau-Weiß 1890 Berlin	24	(0)
1987–1989	Gent	41	(1)

International career
1975–1986	Belgium	50	(3)

Managerial career
- 1989–1993: Gent
- 1993–1994: Standard Liège
- 1994–1997: R.W.D. Molenbeek
- 1997: Anderlecht
- 2000: Mainz 05
- 2002–2004: Twente
- 2004–2005: Genk
- 2006–2009: Belgium
Medal record
Men's football
Representing Belgium
UEFA European Championship
Runner-up	1980 Italy
- * Club domestic league appearances and goals

René Vandereycken (born 22 July 1953) is a Belgian retired professional footballer and manager. During his playing career, he played as a midfielder. He was the head coach of the Belgium national team from 2006 to 2009.

== Club career ==
Vandereycken was born in Spalbeek. He played for Club Brugge, Genoa and Anderlecht.

== International career ==
Vandereycken earned 50 caps and scored three goals for the Belgium national team. He represented the country at the 1980 UEFA European Championship, where they reached the final, in which he scored a penalty in a 2–1 loss to West Germany.

== Coaching career ==
Vandereycken coached Twente as well as Anderlecht for some months and was fired by Genk in June 2005 after he managed to qualify the team for the UEFA Cup. He also managed Gent, Standard Liège, RWD Molenbeek and Mainz 05. Vandereycken is known to like the defensive play and to be a tactician.

He was the head coach of the Belgium national team from January 2006 to April 2009. During this time, he was subject to criticism in the press for his tactical decisions. He was sacked on 7 April 2009 following poor results in their 2010 FIFA World Cup qualifying campaign, including two back-to-back losses against Bosnia and Herzegovina.

== Career statistics ==
=== International ===
Appearances and goals by national team and year
National team	Year	Apps	Goals
Belgium	1975	1	0
Belgium	1976	2	0
Belgium	1977	3	0
Belgium	1978	4	0
Belgium	1979	7	1
Belgium	1980	11	2
Belgium	1981	5	0
Belgium	1982	2	0
Belgium	1983	–	
Belgium	1984	6	0
Belgium	1985	5	0
Belgium	1986	4	0
Total		50	3

Scores and results list Belgium's goal tally first, score column indicates score after each Vandereycken goal.

List of international goals scored by René Vandereycken
No.	Date	Venue	Opponent	Score	Result	Competition
1	28 March 1979	Constant Vanden Stock Stadium, Brussels, Belgium	Austria	1–0	1–1	UEFA Euro 1980 qualification
2	27 February 1980	Heysel Stadium, Brussels, Belgium	Luxembourg	2–0	5–0	Friendly
3	22 June 1980	Stadio Olimpico, Rome, Italy	West Germany	1–1	1–2	UEFA Euro 1980

== Honours ==
=== Player ===
Club Brugge

- Belgian First Division: 1975–76, 1976–77, 1977–78, 1979–80
- Belgian Cup: 1976–77
- Belgian Super Cup: 1980
- European Champion Clubs' Cup runner-up: 1977–78
- UEFA Cup runner-up: 1975–76
- Japan Cup Kirin World Soccer: 1981
- Jules Pappaert Cup: 1978

Anderlecht

- Belgian First Division: 1984–85, 1985–86
- Belgian Super Cup: 1985
- UEFA Cup runner-up: 1983–84
- Bruges Matins: 1985
- Jules Pappaert Cup: 1983, 1985

Belgium

- UEFA European Championship runner-up: 1980
- FIFA World Cup fourth place: 1986
- Belgian Sports Merit Award: 1980

=== Manager ===
Individual

- Belgian Professional Manager of the Year: 1991
