= Adolf Prokop =

German football referee (1939–2026)

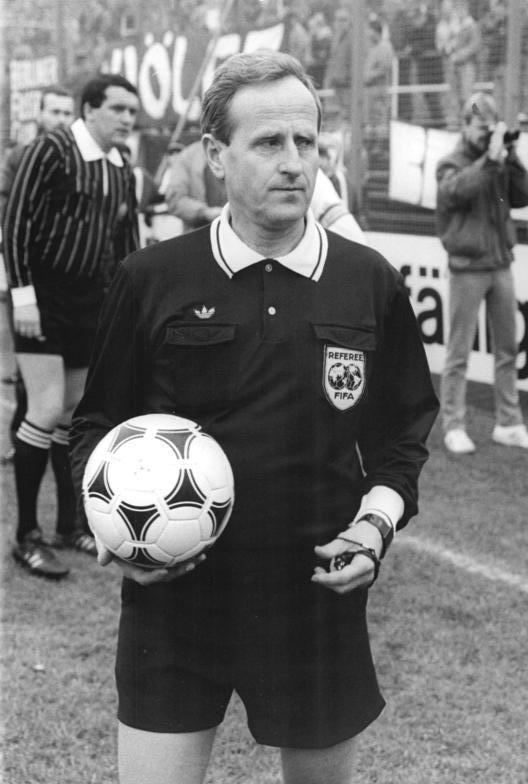
- Prokop in 1988
- Born: 2 February 1939; Altenbuch, Nazi Germany
- Died: 13 August 2026 (aged 87); Erfurt, Thuringia, Germany
- Occupation: Football referee

Adolf Prokop (2 February 1939 – 12 August 2026) was a football referee from East Germany.

Prokop is mostly known for supervising two matches in the FIFA World Cup, one in 1978 and one in 1982. He was also active at the 1976 Olympics, UEFA Euro 1984 and refereed the 1984 European Cup Winners' Cup Final.

Prokop died on 12 August 2026, at the age of 87.
