= Jan Ceulemans =

Belgian footballer

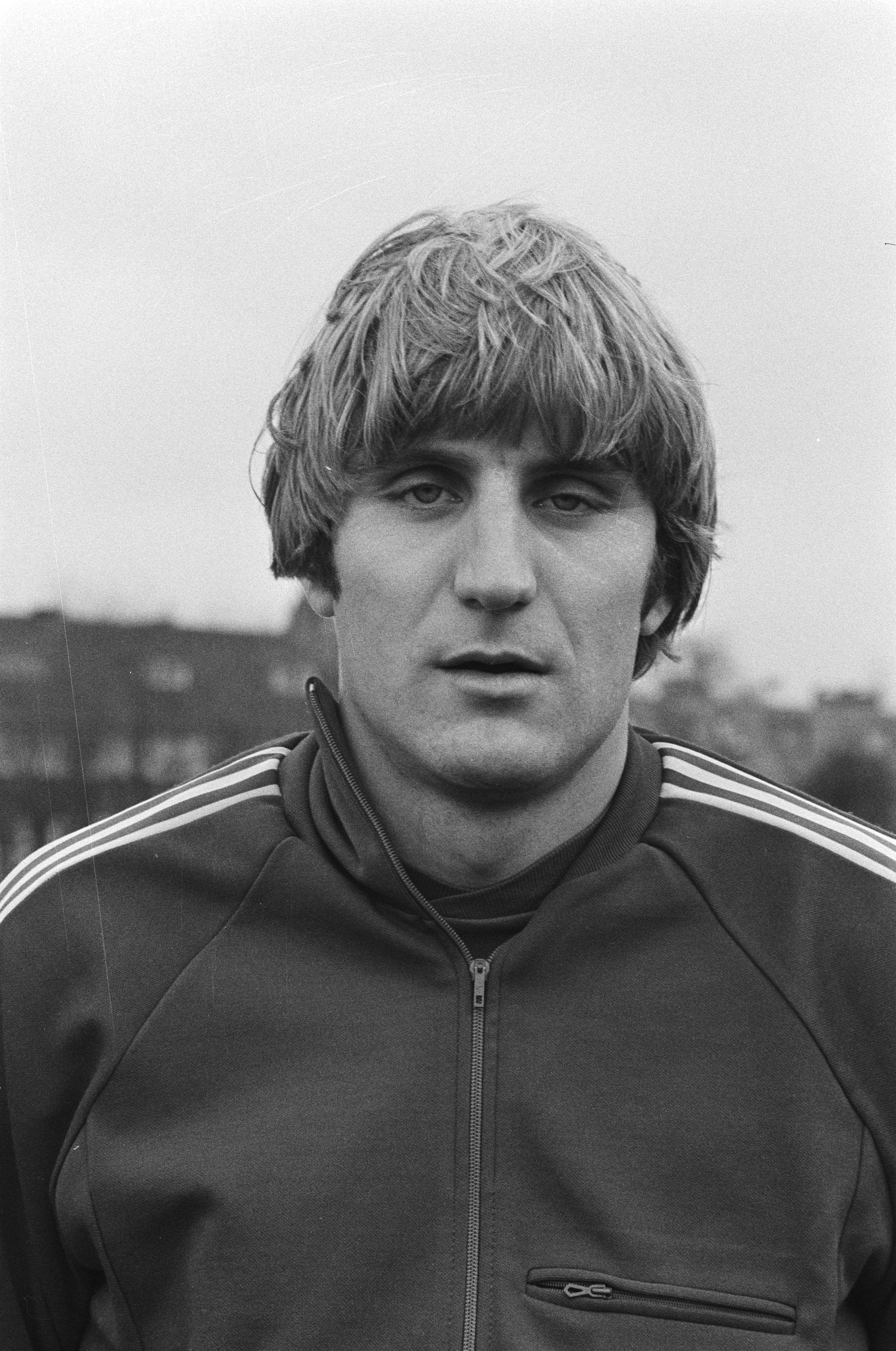
- Ceulemans in 1980

Personal information
- Date of birth: 28 February 1957 (age 69)
- Place of birth: Lier, Belgium
- Height: 1.91 m (6 ft 3 in)
- Positions: Midfielder; forward

Youth career
- 1967–1974: Lierse

Senior career*
Years	Team	Apps	(Gls)
1974–1978	Lierse	110	(39)
1978–1992	Club Brugge	407	(191)
Total		517	(230)

International career
1977–1991	Belgium	96	(23)

Managerial career
- 1992–1996: Eendracht Aalst
- 1997–1999: Ingelmunster
- 1999–2005: Westerlo
- 2005–2006: Club Brugge
- 2007–2012: Westerlo
- 2013–2014: Cappellen
- 2015: Deinze
Medal record
Representing Belgium
UEFA European Championship
Runner-up	1980
- * Club domestic league appearances and goals

Jan Ceulemans (Flemish pronunciation: [ˈjɑŋ ˈkøːləmɑns]; born 28 February 1957) is a Belgian former professional footballer who played as a midfielder or forward. A prolific goalscorer, Ceulemans was known for his stamina, aerial ability, technique and was also recognized as one of the greatest Belgian footballers of all time. He was also known for his power, imposing frame and natural authority.

Ceulemans was also a regular member of the Belgium national football team, with 96 international appearances, a record that stood for 26 years until it was surpassed by Jan Vertonghen's 97th appearance for Belgium on 10 October 2017; Ceulemans is now the ninth most-capped for Belgium. He still holds the record for most appearances in the Belgian Pro League with 517. Most of his time with Belgium took place under the guidance of Guy Thys. This period saw the Belgium squad record some of their finest results, which include reaching the final of Euro 80 and fourth place at the 1986 FIFA World Cup.

== Career ==
Ceulemans was born in Lier, Belgium. His first of three World Cup appearances was at the 1982 FIFA World Cup, where Belgium beat the defending champions Argentina 1–0 in the opening game of the tournament at Camp Nou en route to reaching the second round. Among Ceulemans' finest achievements was captaining his national side to fourth place in the 1986 FIFA World Cup, scoring three goals in the tournament including a spectacular diving header against Spain in the quarter-finals. His performance earned the nickname "Captain Courageous". He retired from international competition after the 1990 FIFA World Cup; Jan scored the third goal in a 3–1 win over Uruguay but Belgium was eliminated by England in the round of sixteen, with the winning goal being scored by David Platt in the 119th minute in extra time. Jan had struck the post during the game.

Professionally, he stayed at Club Brugge for 13 years, endearing himself to his country when he turned down an offer from Italian club A.C. Milan. He remains the only football player to have posed with the A.C. Milan board for the press that never actually became an A.C. Milan player.

After retiring as a player due to knee injury, he became a manager at KSC Eendracht Aalst in 1992. He won promotion to Belgian First Division and even a qualification for UEFA Cup. He moved in 1998 to K.V.C. Westerlo where he also qualified for UEFA Cup. In 2005, he is back at 'his' Club Brugge where he would be manager for three years but after several bad results he was fired in April 2006. For the 2007–08 season, he returned to K.V.C. Westerlo. He currently lives in Westerlo.

Ceulemans was named by Pelé as one of the top 125 greatest living footballers in March 2004.

== Style of play ==
Considered one of Belgium's greatest players, Ceulemans was a complete and versatile player, able to play anywhere in midfield or the attack. A physically powerful player with a tall frame, Ceulemans had great technique, was a good passer of the ball, possessed a powerful shot, and was superb in the air. He also stood out for his mentality and leadership on the pitch, receiving the nicknames. Fellow Belgium national team teammate Eric Gerets said of Ceulemans: "He wasn't the best dribbler, not the best finisher and not an assist master. He had all three. He was complete."

== Career statistics ==
Appearances and goals by club, season and competition
Club	Season	League			National cup		Europe		Other		Total	
Club	Season	Division	Apps	Goals	Apps	Goals	Apps	Goals	Apps	Goals	Apps	Goals
Lierse	1974–75	First Division	15	1	2	3	—		—		17	4
Lierse	1975–76	First Division	29	12	3	1	—		—		32	13
Lierse	1976–77	First Division	34	12	2	1	2 (Note: Appearances in UEFA Cup Winners' Cup)	1	—		38	14
Lierse	1977–78	First Division	32	14		—			3 (Note: Appearances in UEFA Intertoto Cup)	3	39	19
Lierse	Total		110	39	11	7	2	1	3	3	126	50
Club Brugge	1978–79	First Division	34	13	8	9	2 (Note: Appearances in European Champion Clubs' Cup)	2	—		44	24
Club Brugge	1979–80	First Division	34	29	5	4	—		—		39	33
Club Brugge	1980–81	First Division	32	12	3	1	2	1	1 (Note: Appearances in Belgian Super Cup)	1	38	15
Club Brugge	1981–82	First Division	29	11	2	0	2 (Note: Appearances in UEFA Cup)	0	—		33	11
Club Brugge	1982–83	First Division	33	14	8	6	—		—		41	20
Club Brugge	1983–84	First Division	31	15	2	0	—		—		33	15
Club Brugge	1984–85	First Division	27	17	4	3	3	1	—		34	21
Club Brugge	1985–86	First Division	33	13	9	7	4	1	—		46	21
Club Brugge	1986–87	First Division	28	12	2	1	2	0	1	1	33	14
Club Brugge	1987–88	First Division	30	13	3	2	9	5	—		42	20
Club Brugge	1988–89	First Division	28	13	4	0	4	0	1	0	37	13
Club Brugge	1989–90	First Division	34	15	2	3	4	1	—		40	19
Club Brugge	1990–91	First Division	33	14	7	3	4	0	1	0	45	17
Club Brugge	Total		406	191	59	39	36	11	6	2	505	243
Career total			516	230	70	46	38	12	9	5	631	293

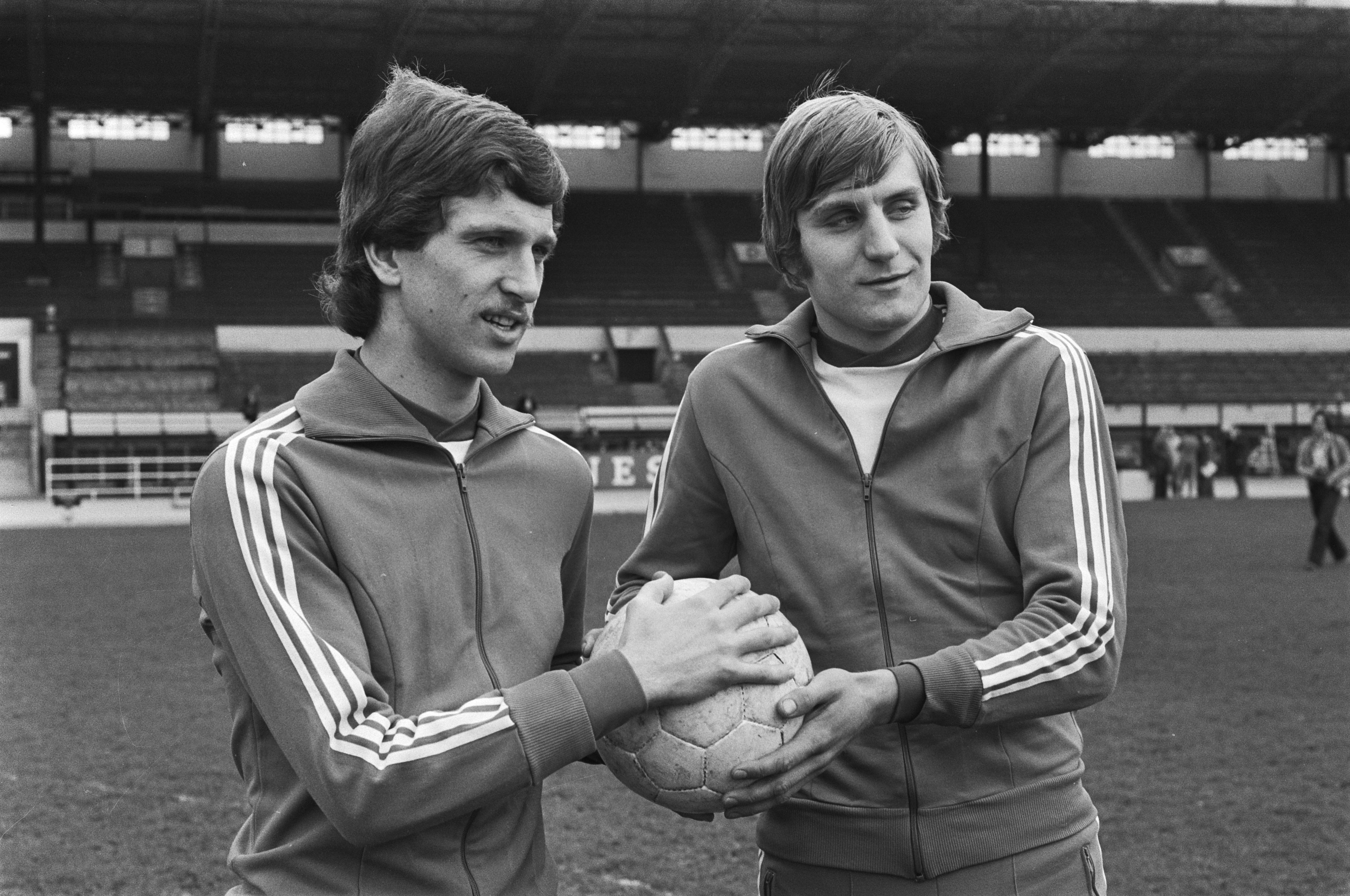
Ludo Coeck and Ceulemans during a training of the national team in 1977

Appearances and goals by national team and year
National team	Year	Apps	Goals
Belgium	1977	3	0
Belgium	1978	2	0
Belgium	1979	5	0
Belgium	1980	11	3
Belgium	1981	5	3
Belgium	1982	10	0
Belgium	1983	5	1
Belgium	1984	8	3
Belgium	1985	5	0
Belgium	1986	12	4
Belgium	1987	5	0
Belgium	1988	5	2
Belgium	1989	9	4
Belgium	1990	9	1
Belgium	1991	2	1
Total		96	23

List of international goals scored by Jan Ceulemans
No.	Cap	Date	Venue	Opponent	Score	Result	Competition
1	14	6 June 1980	Heysel Stadium, Brussels, Belgium	Romania	1–1	2–1	Friendly
2	15	12 June 1980	Stadio Comunale, Turin, Italy	England	1–1	1–1	UEFA Euro 1980 Group stage
3	21	21 December 1980	Makario Stadium, Nicosia, Cyprus	Cyprus	2–0	2–0	1982 World Cup qualification
4	22	18 February 1981	Heysel Stadium, Brussels, Belgium	Cyprus	2–0	3–2	1982 World Cup qualification
5	23	25 March 1981	Heysel Stadium, Brussels, Belgium	Republic of Ireland	1–0	1–0	1982 World Cup qualification
6	24	29 April 1981	Parc des Princes, Paris, France	France	2–3	2–3	1982 World Cup qualification
7	38	27 April 1983	Heysel Stadium, Brussels, Belgium	East Germany	1–1	2–1	Euro 1984 qualification
8	43	6 June 1984	Heysel Stadium, Brussels, Belgium	Hungary	1–0	2–2	Friendly
9	43	6 June 1984	Heysel Stadium, Brussels, Belgium	Hungary	2–2	2–2	Friendly
10	46	19 June 1984	Stade de la Meinau, Strasbourg, France	Denmark	1–0	2–3	UEFA Euro 1984 Group stage
11	60	15 June 1986	Estadio León, León, Mexico	Soviet Union	2–2	4–3 (a.e.t.)	1986 World Cup Round of 16
12	61	22 June 1986	Estadio Cuauhtémoc, Puebla, Mexico	Spain	1–0	2–2 (a.e.t.)	1986 World Cup Quarter finals
13	63	28 June 1986	Estadio Cuauhtémoc, Puebla, Mexico	France	1–0	2–4 (a.e.t.)	1986 World Cup Third place play-off
14	65	14 October 1986	Stade Municipal, Luxembourg City, Luxembourg	Luxembourg	5–0	6–0	Euro 1988 qualification
15	71	11 November 1987	Heysel Stadium, Brussels, Belgium	Luxembourg	1–0	3–0	Euro 1988 qualification
16	73	26 March 1988	Heysel Stadium, Brussels, Belgium	Hungary	1–0 ‡	3–0	Friendly
17	74	5 June 1988	Odense Stadium, Odense, Denmark	Denmark	1–0	1–3	Friendly
18	81	8 June 1989	Terry Fox Stadium, Ottawa, Canada	Canada	1–0	2–0	Friendly
19	82	23 August 1989	Olympiastadion, Bruges, Belgium	Denmark	2–0	3–0	Friendly
20	82	23 August 1989	Olympiastadion, Bruges, Belgium	Denmark	3–0 ‡	3–0	Friendly
21	86	6 September 1989	Heysel Stadium, Brussels, Belgium	Portugal	1–0	3–0	1990 World Cup qualification
22	90	17 June 1990	Stadio Marcantonio Bentegodi, Verona, Italy	Uruguay	3–0	3–1	1990 World Cup Group stage
23	96	27 February 1991	Constant Vanden Stock Stadium, Anderlecht, Belgium	Luxembourg	2–0	3–0	Euro 1992 qualification

Key
‡	Indicates goal was scored from a penalty kick

== Honours ==
=== Player ===
Club Brugge

- Belgian First Division: 1979–80, 1987–88, 1989–90
- Belgian Cup: 1985–86, 1990–91; runner-up 1978–79, 1982–83
- Belgian Super Cup: 1980, 1986, 1988, 1990, 1991
- Jules Pappaert Cup: 1978, 1991
- Bruges Matins: 1979, 1981, 1984, 1990
- Japan Cup Kirin World Soccer: 1981
- Amsterdam Tournament: 1990

Belgium

- UEFA European Championship runner-up: 1980
- FIFA World Cup fourth place: 1986
- Belgian Sports Merit Award: 1980

Individual

- Belgian First Division Man of the Season: 1979–80, 1982–83, 1985–86
- Belgian Golden Shoe: 1980, 1985, 1986, runner-up 1979, 1984
- UEFA European Championship Team of the Tournament: 1980
- Ballon d'Or 5th place: 1980; nominations 1981, 1985, 1986
- Sport Ideal European XI: 1980
- Onze de Bronze: 1981
- Onze Mondial: 1980, 1981
- Belgian Professional Footballer of the Year: 1984, 1985, 1986
- FIFA World Cup All-Star Team: 1986
- Belgian Fair Play Award: 1986
- Former Belgium's Most Capped Player: 1989–2017 (96 caps)
- World Soccer Magazine World XI: 1990
- Belgian Sports Merit Award: 1990
- Belgian Golden Shoe of the 20th Century (2nd place): 1995
- Voetbal International's 50 World Stars by Raf Willems: 1999
- Platina 11 (Best Team in 50 Years Golden Shoe Winners): 2003
- FIFA 100: 2004
- The Best Golden Shoe Team Ever: 2011
- Het Nieuwsblad Best Club Brugge player ever: 2011
- Honorary Citizen of Lier: 2014
- These Football Times Top 50 Legends: 2017
- RBFA 125 Years Icons Team: 2020
- Pro League Hall of Fame: 2024

=== Manager ===
Eendracht Aalst

- Belgian Second Division play-off winner: 1993–94

KVC Westerlo

- Belgian Cup: 2000–01

Club Brugge

- Belgian Super Cup: 2005
