= UEFA Euro 1976 final =

Association football match

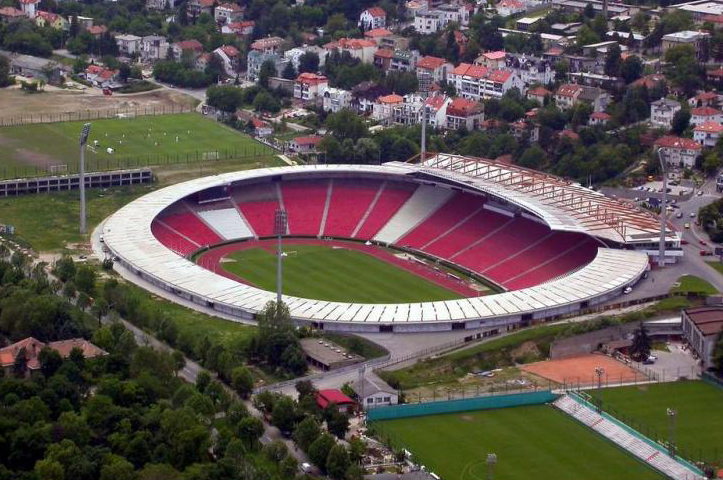
- The Stadion Crvena Zvezda held the final.
- Event: UEFA Euro 1976
Czechoslovakia	West Germany
2	2
- After extra time Czechoslovakia won 5–3 on penalties
- Date: 20 June 1976
- Venue: Stadion Crvena Zvezda, Belgrade
- Referee: Sergio Gonella (Italy)
- Attendance: 30,790

The UEFA Euro 1976 final was the final match of the UEFA Euro 1976, the fifth edition of the European Championship, UEFA's top football competition for national teams. Contested by Czechoslovakia and West Germany, the match was played at Stadion Crvena Zvezda in Belgrade, Yugoslavia, on 20 June 1976.

En route to the final, Czechoslovakia finished top of their qualifying group, which included England, Cyprus and Portugal. After beating the Soviet Union 4–2 on aggregate over a two-legged tie in the quarter-finals, they progressed to the final after defeating the Netherlands 3–1 after extra time in the semi-finals. West Germany also won their qualifying group, which included Greece, Malta and Bulgaria, before beating Spain 3–1 on aggregate in the two-legged quarter-finals and then tournament hosts Yugoslavia 4–2 after extra time in the single-match semi-final.

The final took place in front of 30,790 supporters, and was refereed by Sergio Gonella from Italy. Following a 2–2 draw after extra time, Czechoslovakia won 5–3 on penalties to secure their only European Championship title. The winning Czechoslovak penalty, gently lobbed straight in the middle of the net, was famously scored by Antonín Panenka, and his name is now synonymous with that particular style of penalty kick. Until they lost on penalties against Paraguay in the 2026 FIFA World Cup round of 32, this was West or reunified Germany’s only penalty shootout loss in a major tournament.

== Background ==
UEFA Euro 1976 was the fifth edition of the UEFA European Football Championship, UEFA's football competition for national teams. Thirty-two teams competed in qualifying rounds, which were played on a home-and-away round-robin basis, between 1 September 1974 and 28 February 1976, before the two-legged quarter-finals were held between 24 April and 22 May 1976. The semi-finals and final took place in Yugoslavia, between 16 and 20 June 1976. A third-place play-off match took place the day before the final.

West Germany went into the 1976 Final as reigning European and world champions, having defeated the Soviet Union 3–0 in the UEFA Euro 1972 Final and the Netherlands in the 1974 FIFA World Cup Final. Czechoslovakia had failed to progress beyond their group stage of UEFA Euro 1972, finishing level on points with Romania but behind them on goal difference. Czechoslovakia had failed to qualify for the 1974 FIFA World Cup finals when they ended their three-team group stage in second place, behind Scotland. The UEFA Euro 1976 Final was the third competitive fixture between West Germany and Czechoslovakia, the sides having played one another in the 1934 and the 1958 FIFA World Cups.

== Route to the final ==
=== Czechoslovakia ===
Czechoslovakia's route to the final
Round	Opposition	Score
Qualifying group	England	0–3 (A), 2–1 (H)
Qualifying group	Cyprus	4–0 (H), 3–0 (A)
Qualifying group	Portugal	5–0 (H), 1–1 (A)
Quarter-final	Soviet Union	2–0 (H), 2–2 (A)
Semi-final	Netherlands	3–1 (a.e.t.) (N)

Czechoslovakia commenced their UEFA Euro 1976 campaign in qualifying group 1 where they faced three other teams in a home-and-away round-robin tournament. Their first fixture was against England and was played at Wembley Stadium on 30 October 1974. After a goalless first half, Mick Channon opened the scoring midway through the second half. Two goals in quick succession from Colin Bell secured a 3–0 win for England. Czechoslovakia's next qualifying game came almost six months later, at home, when they faced Cyprus at the Stadion Letná in Prague. Antonín Panenka scored twice before half-time before completing his hat-trick five minutes after the interval with a penalty. Marián Masný added a fourth goal twelve minutes before full-time to give Czechoslovakia a 4–0 victory. Ten days later Czechoslovakia played Portugal at the Stadion Letná. Přemysl Bičovský scored twice before Zdeněk Nehoda's goal made it 3–0 at half time. Nehoda scored his second almost immediately after the interval and with a 52nd-minute goal from Ladislav Petráš, Czechoslovakia secured a 5–0 win.

England were Czechoslovakia's next opponents and although the match was originally scheduled for 29 October 1975, it was abandoned after 17 minutes as a result of thick fog. The fixture was fulfilled the following afternoon and although Channon gave England the lead midway through the first half, goals either side of half-time from Nehoda and Dušan Galis ensured a 2–1 victory for Czechoslovakia. Their next opponents were Portugal at the Estádio das Antas in Porto on 12 November 1975. Anton Ondruš gave Czechoslovakia the lead in the seventh minute but Nené equalised almost immediately and no further goals were scored, resulting in a 1–1 draw. The final group match for Czechoslovakia was away against Cyprus at the Tsirio Stadium on 23 November 1975. Nehoda opened the scoring early in the first half before Bičovský and Masný made it 3–0 before half-time. The second half was goalless and the result ensured that Czechoslovakia ended as winners of Group 1, one point ahead of England, and securing progression to the quarter-finals.

Czechoslovakia faced the Soviet Union there with the first leg being played at Tehelné pole in Bratislava on 24 April 1976. Konstantin Beskov, the Soviet Union manager, had been dismissed following defeat to the Republic of Ireland during the qualifying round. His replacement, Valeriy Lobanovskyi was the Dynamo Kiev manager and selected eight of his club side for the national team. The match was played in wet conditions and Jozef Móder opened the scoring for Czechoslovakia, striking past Aleksandr Prokhorov in the 34th minute. Just after half-time, Panenka doubled Czechoslovakia's lead when his free kick passed under the Soviet Union's defensive wall and into the bottom corner of the net. Oleg Blokhin missed an opportunity to reduce the deficit for the Soviet Union late in the second half and the match ended 2–0. The second leg was held at the Central Stadium in Kiev on 22 May 1976. Ivo Viktor, the Czechoslovak goalkeeper, made several saves in the first half, denying Blokhin, Volodymyr Veremeyev and Anatoliy Konkov, before Móder gave Czechoslovakia the lead with a free kick just before half-time. Eight minutes into the second half, Leonid Buryak equalised but Móder restored Czechoslovakia's lead after a Karol Dobiaš breakaway with eight minutes remaining. Blokhin sent a chipped shot over Viktor in the 87th minute to make it 2–2, but Czechoslovakia progressed with a 4–2 aggregate victory.

In their semi-final, Czechoslovakia's opponents were the Netherlands with the one-off match being played at the Stadion Maksimir in Zagreb, a neutral venue. The match was played in torrential rain with the referee holding an umbrella over the two captains for the pre-match handshake. Czechoslovakia dominated the early stages and took the lead in the 19th minute when Ondruš scored with a header from Panenka's free kick. Jaroslav Pollák was booked for encroaching on the Netherlands' free kicks and was then sent off for a foul on Johan Neeskens on the hour mark. With 17 minutes remaining, Ondruš sliced the ball into the Czechoslovak net when attempting to clear a cross from Ruud Geels to level the score with an own goal. Neeskens was then dismissed for a foul on Nehoda before Viktor denied Rob Rensenbrink on three separate occasions to send the game into extra time. In the 114th minute, substitute František Veselý crossed for Nehoda whose header made it 2–1, before Willem van Hanegem of the Netherlands became the third player to be sent off, for dissent. Four minutes later, Panenka passed to Veselý who avoided Netherlands defender Piet Schrijvers before striking the ball into the goal, securing a 3–1 victory and passage to the final.

=== West Germany ===
West Germany's route to the final
Round	Opposition	Score
Qualifying group	Greece	2–2 (A), 1–1 (H)
Qualifying group	Malta	1–0 (A), 8–0 (H)
Qualifying group	Bulgaria	1–1 (A), 1–0 (H)
Quarter-final	Spain	1–1 (A), 2–0 (H)
Semi-final	Yugoslavia	4–2 (a.e.t.) (N)

West Germany were in Qualifying Group 8 and the first match of their campaign was against Greece at the Karaiskakis Stadium in Piraeus on 20 November 1974. Georgios Delikaris scored the only goal of the first half to give Greece a 1–0 lead at half-time. Bernhard Cullmann equalised for West Germany early in the second half before Kostas Eleftherakis restored Greece's lead with 20 minutes of the game remaining. Herbert Wimmer then levelled the match in the 82nd minute and the game ended in a 2–2 draw. The following month, West Germany faced Malta in the first competitive match between the sides, at the Empire Stadium in Gżira. Cullmann gave West Germany the lead just before half-time and with a goalless second half, the match finished 1–0. West Germany's next opponents were Greece who they played at the Rheinstadion in Düsseldorf on 11 October 1975. After a goalless first half, Jupp Heynckes scored midway through the second to give West Germany the lead, but Delikaris equalised with twelve minutes remaining to secure a 1–1 draw. West Germany then played their return fixture against Bulgaria on 19 November 1975 at the Neckarstadion in Stuttgart. The only goal of the game came midway through the second half as Heynckes' strike secured a 1–0 win. In their final group game, West Germany's faced Malta at the Westfalenstadion in Dortmund on 28 February 1976. Ronnie Worm scored twice and Heynckes added a third before Erich Beer converted a penalty to give West Germany a 4–0 half-time lead. Heynckes and Beer both doubled their tally before Berti Vogts and Bernd Hölzenbein scored late in the game to secure an 8–0 win for their side. West Germany finished top of their group, two points ahead of Greece, and qualified for the quarter-finals.

There, West Germany faced Spain in the two-legged tie with the first match taking place at the Metropolitano Stadium in Madrid on 24 April 1976. Santillana gave Spain the lead midway through the first half: outjumping Hans-Georg Schwarzenbeck, he controlled Goyo Benito's cross and struck it past Sepp Maier in the West Germany goal. Fifteen minutes into the second half, Beer equalised with a shot from around 25 yards (23 m) which Spain's goalkeeper José Ángel Iribar could not keep out, and the match ended 1–1. The return leg was held at the Olympiastadion in Munich on 22 May 1976. Uli Hoeneß put West Germany ahead in the 17th minute volleyed Beer's cross over his own shoulder to make it 1–0 before Klaus Toppmöller doubled the lead just before half-time when he converted a rebound after Miguel Ángel saved Franz Beckenbauer's shot. The second half was goalless and the match ended 2–0, West Germany progressing with a 3–1 aggregate win.

In the semi-final, West Germany's opponents were the host nation Yugoslavia and the match was played on 17 June 1976 at the Crvena Zvezda Stadium in Belgrade. Yugoslavia dominated the first half, Dragan Džajić later suggesting that it was "maybe the best half the Yugoslav national team have ever played". They took the lead in the 19th minute through Danilo Popivoda who controlled Branko Oblak's high ball before outrunning Beckenbauer and striking the ball under Maier. Eleven minutes later, Yugoslavia doubled their lead when Maier failed to keep hold of Slaviša Žungul's cross and Džajić scored with his knee, and after Josip Katalinski cleared a shot from Hoeneß off the Yugoslavia goalline, the first half ended 2–0. Midway through the second half, West Germany substitute Heinz Flohe's shot was deflected off Wimmer past Ognjen Petrović in the Yugoslavia goal to halve the deficit. In the 79th minute, West Germany made their second substitution with Wimmer being replaced by Dieter Müller who was making his international debut, and scored with his first touch, a header from a Rainer Bonhof cross to level the score at 2–2. In the first half of extra time, Yugoslavia had several opportunities to score but Maier was not beaten. With five minutes remaining, Müller scored again after a Hölzenbein pass, before completing his hat-trick four minutes later, converting a rebound after Bonhof's initial shot had hit the Yugoslavia goalpost. The match ended 4–2 and West Germany progressed to the final.

== Match ==
=== Pre-match ===
Müller retained his place in the West Germany team, replacing Dietmar Danner, and Beckenbauer was selected for his 100th cap, an unparalleled achievement for the Germany national football team. Ján Švehlík came in for Czechoslovakia as Pollák was suspended for the final following his dismissal in the previous match. It was the eighth meeting between the sides, each team having won three of those encounters. The most recent match was a friendly in March 1973 which West Germany won 3–0.

Although Czechoslovakia were considered underdogs, Beckenbauer warned that "[Czechoslovakia] as a team is to be estimated higher than Yugoslavia. How strong they are, we have seen in the extra time against Holland, where they were even able to increase [their strength]". Schön was confident of his side's chance to win: "We have a wonderful team. You can absolutely rely on them." The final was broadcast live in the United Kingdom on the ITV network. Before the match, the teams had agreed that should the result be a draw, then a penalty shoot-out would be used to determine the overall winner, as opposed to a replay the following Tuesday.

German magazine Kicker reported that the Germany team had suggested the use of the penalty shoot-out, while author Thomas Roth claimed that the German Football Association had made the decision without consulting their players. The Czechoslovak team had prepared for a potential shoot-out while training ahead of the tournament, their manager Václav Ježek deploying hundreds of people behind the goal to intimidate the penalty takers.

=== Summary ===
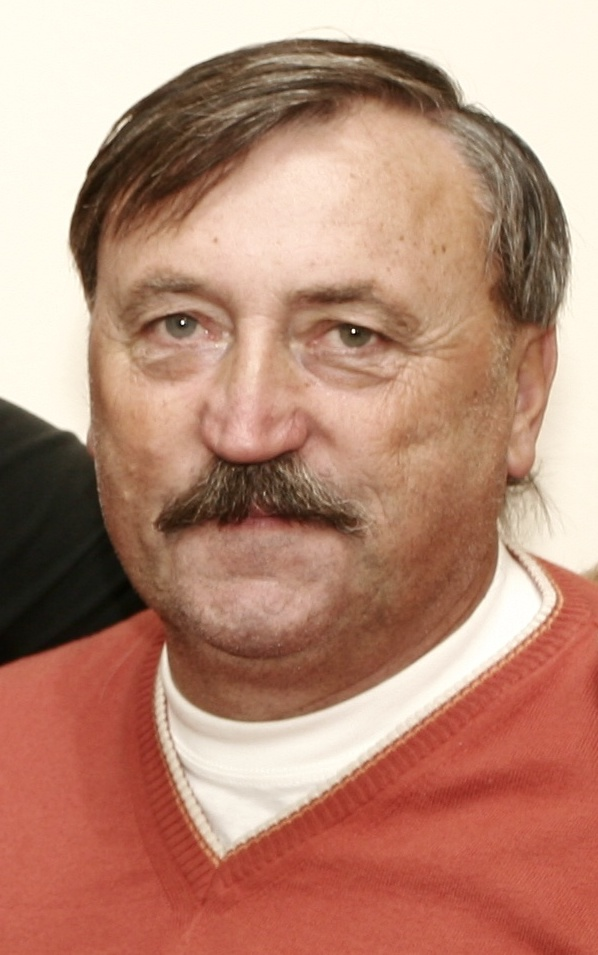
Antonín Panenka (pictured in 2009) scored the winning penalty for Czechoslovakia.

The final took place on 20 June 1976 at the Red Star Stadium in front of 30,790 supporters and was refereed by Sergio Gonella from Italy. Czechoslovakia took the lead in the eighth minute through Švehlík: Masný passed to him on the edge of the penalty area and his initial shot was saved by Maier. The rebound fell to Nehoda who passed the ball across the goalmouth, which was missed by Ondruš but converted by Švehlík. He was then elbowed in the head by Schwarzenbeck and required medical treatment, but the West Germany player was not booked. Müller then passed to Viktor down the right wing but Maier came out to block the opportunity to score. The Czechoslovak goalkeeper then punched Bonhof's strong shot away before pushing Hölzenbein's curling strike over the crossbar. Midway through the first half, Schwarzenbeck fouled Koloman Gögh and Masný took the resulting free kick which was cleared by Beckenbauer as far as Dobiaš who struck a half-volley past Maier to make it 2–0. Within four minutes, West Germany had halved the deficit as Müller scored his fourth international goal in 80 minutes after volleying Bonhof's cross into the Czechoslovak goal.

During the half-time interval, the Germany manager Helmut Schön made his first substitution, replacing Wimmer with Flohe. Early in the second half, Flohe relinquished possession and allowed Švehlík to shoot but the ball flew wide of the West Germany goal. Müller's shot was then blocked by Viktor who claimed the rebound at the feet of Beer. In the 60th minute, a shot from Hoeneß hit a defender and Beer's strike from the rebound was saved by Viktor before Hoeneß then struck the post. Schwarzenbeck cleared a shot from Ondruš off the West Germany goalline before Viktor made saves from both Bonhof and Beckenbauer. Nehoda's header hit the West Germany goalpost before Bonhof's deflected free kick was palmed over the crossbar by Viktor. With around ten minutes remaining, both sides made substitutions, Czechoslovakia's Ladislav Jurkemik coming on for Švehlík and West Germany's Beer being replaced by Hannes Bongartz. In the final minute of regular time, West Germany won a corner which was headed past Viktor by Hölzenbein at the near post. With the score level at 2–2 and no time left to re-start, the game went into extra time.

Viktor made saves from Flohe and Müller but with no change to the scoreline after the additional 30 minutes, the match went to a penalty shoot-out for the first time in the tournament's history. Masný scored the first penalty kick before Bonhof levelled the shoot-out when his strike went in off the goalpost. Nehoda, Ondruš and Jurkemik then all scored for Czechoslovakia while Flohe and Bongartz converted their penalties to make it 4–3 as Hoeneß stepped up to take his kick. Striking it firmly, the ball sailed high over the Czechoslovak crossbar leaving Panenka with the opportunity to win the final for his side should he score. Taking a short and stuttering run-up, he gently struck the ball in an arcing parabola into the net while Maier had already dived and was resting on his knees. The match ended 5–3 with Czechoslovakia winning their only European Championship.

=== Details ===
20 June 1976
20:15 CET

Czechoslovakia	2–2 (a.e.t.)	West Germany
Švehlík 8'; Dobiaš 25'	Report; Positions	Müller 28'; Hölzenbein 89'
Penalties
Masný (penalty scored); Nehoda (penalty scored); Ondruš (penalty scored); Jurkemik (penalty scored); Panenka (penalty scored)	5–3	(penalty scored) Bonhof; (penalty scored) Flohe; (penalty scored) Bongartz; (penalty missed) Hoeneß

Red Star Stadium, Belgrade
Attendance: 30,790
Referee: Sergio Gonella (Italy)

Czechoslovakia	West Germany

GK	1	Ivo Viktor
SW	4	Anton Ondruš (c)
RB	5	Ján Pivarník
CB	12	Koloman Gögh
LB	3	Jozef Čapkovič
CM	2	Karol Dobiaš	(yellow card) 55'	(substituted off) 94'
CM	8	Jozef Móder	(yellow card) 59'
AM	7	Antonín Panenka
RW	10	Marián Masný
LW	11	Zdeněk Nehoda
CF	17	Ján Švehlík		(substituted off) 79'
Substitutions:
DF	6	Ladislav Jurkemik		(substituted on) 79'
MF	16	František Veselý		(substituted on) 94'
Manager:
Václav Ježek

GK	1	Sepp Maier
SW	5	Franz Beckenbauer (c)
RB	2	Berti Vogts
CB	4	Hans-Georg Schwarzenbeck
LB	3	Bernard Dietz
CM	7	Rainer Bonhof
CM	6	Herbert Wimmer	(substituted off) 46'
AM	10	Erich Beer	(substituted off) 80'
RW	8	Uli Hoeneß
LW	11	Bernd Hölzenbein
CF	9	Dieter Müller
Substitutions:
MF	15	Heinz Flohe	(substituted on) 46'
MF	14	Hannes Bongartz	(substituted on) 80'
Manager:
Helmut Schön

== Post-match ==
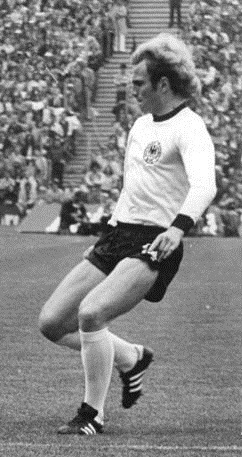
Uli Hoeneß (pictured in 1974) missed the decisive penalty for West Germany.

After the match, the sides upheld a pre-match agreement to exchange shirts. All but three of UEFA's team of the tournament had featured in the final, including six Czechoslovakia and two West Germany players. Hoeneß later described how he had approached his penalty: "I was so exhausted, I was taking no chances, and I hit it with full force. I saw the ball climb higher and higher like a rocket. It whizzed into the clouds. At that moment, everything around me went grey." The European press described Panenka's penalty as "the falling leaf": it has since been replicated by players such as Lionel Messi, Andrea Pirlo and Zinedine Zidane, and is often referred to as "a Panenka". David Lacey, writing for The Guardian described Panenka's winning penalty as "a remarkably cool double shuffle ... before scoring with a cheeky little chip." He went on to suggest that while West Germany "had speed, wit and invention", Czechoslovakia were "more direct in their methods, more inclined to launch searching attacks from deep positions". Berliner Zeitung described the final as dramatic and suggested that Czechoslovakia's win was a "sensation". Fellow Berlin newspaper Neues Deutschland also said the match was "dramatic" and described the Czechoslovakia side as a "brilliant team".

Viktor later recalled that he blamed himself for Czechoslovakia conceding the equaliser in the final moments of the match, suggesting that he "wasn't aggressive enough going for the ball", that he had been tired and had lost concentration. Schön had found it difficult to find five Germany players prepared to take part in the penalty shoot-out. Dietz claimed "I'll drop [if I take one]. I'm broken." while Beckenbauer said that he was not sure he could shoot "with this injured shoulder". Schwarzenbeck remarked that he had not taken a penalty kick for nine years, so "why now?" while Maier was unfazed, stating "I'll take one."

In a 2020 interview with Czech Television, the Czechoslovakia defender Jozef Čapkovič noted that despite their side being composed of both Czechs and Slovaks, there was a harmonious atmosphere, "It wasn't ... who was from where, but what we were playing for. We played for Czechoslovakia then. There was absolute peace, cohesion." Panenka agreed, stating that the team "was an excellent bunch, cohesive. The atmosphere was absolutely great ... There was no difference between a Czech and a Slovak " Dobiaš remarked that Czechoslovakia went into the final without "any worries", and were confident following their victory over the Netherlands.

The French newspaper L'Équipe reported that "this final showed a great dialogue between the playful ease of [Czechoslovakia] and the German football machine. Previously hardly known dimensions were reached." Belgrade's Politika noted that "Czechoslovakia and the Federal Republic left nothing to owe the spectators and played a football dignified of the final. [Czechoslovakia] is completely deservedly the new champion. The Germans endured the failure calmly and stoically." In Italy, Corriere dello Sport reported that "The success has rewarded the unquestionably better team. Germany was deadly wounded in the short time span of 18 minutes in the first half. The Germans have lost the European crown they had won in Brussels in 1972, but they have confirmed that they are an absolutely world class team."

In the following international tournament, the 1978 FIFA World Cup, Czechoslovakia failed to progress past their qualifying group, finishing behind Scotland. West Germany automatically qualified as champions of the 1974 FIFA World Cup but were knocked in the second group stage, placing third behind the Netherlands and Italy.

== See also ==
- Czechoslovakia at the UEFA European Championship
- Germany at the UEFA European Championship
