= UEFA Euro 1976 final tournament =

UEFA Euro 1976 final stage

The final tournament of UEFA Euro 1976 was a single-elimination tournament involving the four teams that qualified from the quarter-finals. There were two rounds of matches: a semi-final stage leading to the final to decide the champions. The final tournament began with the semi-finals on 16 June and ended with the final on 20 June at the Stadion Crvena zvezda in Belgrade. Czechoslovakia won the tournament with a 5–3 penalty shoot-out victory over West Germany.

All times Central European Time (UTC+1)

== Format ==
Any game in the final tournament that was undecided by the end of the regular 90 minutes was followed by thirty minutes of extra time (two 15-minute halves). If scores were still level after 30 minutes of extra time, there would be a penalty shootout (at least five penalties each, and more if necessary) to determine who progressed to the next round.

== Teams ==
Team	Method of qualification	Date of qualification	Finals appearance	Last appearance	Previous best performance
Czechoslovakia	Quarter-final winner	22 May 1976	2nd	1960	Third place (1960)
Netherlands	Quarter-final winner	22 May 1976	1st	—	Debut
West Germany	Quarter-final winner	22 May 1976	2nd	1972	Winners (1972)
Yugoslavia (host)	Quarter-final winner	22 May 1976	3rd	1968	Runners-up (1960, 1968)

== Bracket ==
Semi-finals
16 June – Zagreb
Czechoslovakia (a.e.t.)	3
Netherlands	1
17 June – Belgrade
Yugoslavia	2
West Germany (a.e.t.)	4

Final
20 June – Belgrade
Czechoslovakia (p)	2 (5)
West Germany	2 (3)
Third place play-off
19 June – Zagreb
Netherlands (a.e.t.)	3
Yugoslavia	2

== Semi-finals ==
=== Czechoslovakia vs Netherlands ===
16 June 1976
20:15

Czechoslovakia	3–1 (a.e.t.)	Netherlands
Ondruš 19'; Nehoda 114'; Veselý 118'	Report	Ondruš 73' (o.g.)

Stadion Maksimir, Zagreb
Attendance: 17,879
Referee: Clive Thomas (Wales)

Czechoslovakia	Netherlands

GK	1	Ivo Viktor
SW	4	Anton Ondruš (c)
CB	5	Ján Pivarník
CB	3	Jozef Čapkovič		(substituted off) 106'
CB	12	Koloman Gögh
RM	9	Jaroslav Pollák	(yellow card) 51' (yellow-red card) 60'
CM	7	Antonín Panenka
CM	2	Karol Dobiaš	(yellow card) 113'
LM	8	Jozef Móder		(substituted off) 91'
CF	10	Marián Masný
CF	11	Zdeněk Nehoda
Substitutions:
MF	16	František Veselý		(substituted on) 91'
DF	6	Ladislav Jurkemik		(substituted on) 106'
Manager:
Václav Ježek

GK	1	Piet Schrijvers
SW	4	Adrie van Kraay
CB	2	Wim Suurbier
CB	3	Wim Rijsbergen		(substituted off) 37'
CB	5	Ruud Krol
CM	6	Johan Neeskens	(red card) 76'
CM	7	Wim Jansen
CM	10	Willy van de Kerkhof	(yellow card) 57'
RW	8	Johnny Rep		(substituted off) 65'
LW	11	Rob Rensenbrink
CF	9	Johan Cruyff (c)	(yellow card) 76'
Substitutions:
MF	12	Willem van Hanegem	(red card) 115'	(substituted on) 37'
FW	13	Ruud Geels		(substituted on) 65'
Manager:
George Knobel

=== Yugoslavia vs West Germany ===
17 June 1976
20:15

Yugoslavia	2–4 (a.e.t.)	West Germany
Popivoda 19'; Džajić 30'	Report	Flohe 64'; Müller 82', 115', 119'

Red Star Stadium, Belgrade
Attendance: 50,652
Referee: Alfred Delcourt (Belgium)

Yugoslavia	West Germany

GK	1	Ognjen Petrović
SW	5	Josip Katalinski
CB	2	Ivan Buljan
CB	4	Dražen Mužinić
CM	10	Jurica Jerković
CM	9	Jovan Aćimović (c)	(substituted off) 105'
CM	6	Ivica Šurjak
AM	8	Branko Oblak	(substituted off) 105'
RW	17	Slaviša Žungul
LW	11	Dragan Džajić
CF	7	Danilo Popivoda
Substitutions:
MF	15	Franjo Vladić	(substituted on) 105'
DF	20	Luka Peruzović	(substituted on) 105'
Manager:
Ante Mladinić

GK	1	Sepp Maier
SW	5	Franz Beckenbauer (c)
CB	2	Berti Vogts
CB	3	Bernard Dietz
CB	4	Hans-Georg Schwarzenbeck
DM	7	Rainer Bonhof
CM	6	Herbert Wimmer	(substituted off) 79'
CM	13	Dietmar Danner	(substituted off) 46'
AM	10	Erich Beer
CF	8	Uli Hoeneß
CF	11	Bernd Hölzenbein
Substitutions:
MF	15	Heinz Flohe	(substituted on) 46'
FW	9	Dieter Müller	(substituted on) 79'
Manager:
Helmut Schön

== Third place play-off ==
19 June 1976
20:15

Netherlands	3–2 (a.e.t.)	Yugoslavia
Geels 27', 107'; W. van de Kerkhof 39'	Report	Katalinski 43'; Džajić 82'

Stadion Maksimir, Zagreb
Attendance: 6,766
Referee: Walter Hungerbühler (Switzerland)

Netherlands	Yugoslavia

GK	1	Piet Schrijvers
SW	4	Adrie van Kraay
CB	2	Wim Suurbier
CB	7	Wim Jansen	(substituted off) 46'
CB	5	Ruud Krol (c)
CM	14	Jan Peters
CM	10	Willy van de Kerkhof
CM	16	Peter Arntz	(substituted off) 70'
RW	15	René van de Kerkhof
LW	11	Rob Rensenbrink
CF	13	Ruud Geels
Substitutions:
DF	20	Wim Meutstege	(substituted on) 46'
FW	19	Kees Kist	(substituted on) 70'
Manager:
George Knobel

GK	1	Ognjen Petrović
SW	5	Josip Katalinski
CB	2	Ivan Buljan
CB	4	Dražen Mužinić
CB	6	Ivica Šurjak
CM	10	Jurica Jerković
CM	8	Branko Oblak
CM	9	Jovan Aćimović (c)	(substituted off) 46'
RW	17	Slaviša Žungul	(substituted off) 46'
LW	11	Dragan Džajić
CF	7	Danilo Popivoda
Substitutions:
FW	13	Vahid Halilhodžić	(substituted on) 46'
MF	15	Franjo Vladić	(substituted on) 46'
Manager:
Ante Mladinić

== Final ==
20 June 1976
20:15

Czechoslovakia	2–2 (a.e.t.)	West Germany
Švehlík 8'; Dobiaš 25'	Report; Positions	Müller 28'; Hölzenbein 89'
Penalties
Masný (penalty scored); Nehoda (penalty scored); Ondruš (penalty scored); Jurkemik (penalty scored); Panenka (penalty scored)	5–3	(penalty scored) Bonhof; (penalty scored) Flohe; (penalty scored) Bongartz; (penalty missed) Hoeneß

Red Star Stadium, Belgrade
Attendance: 30,790
Referee: Sergio Gonella (Italy)

Czechoslovakia	West Germany

GK	1	Ivo Viktor
SW	4	Anton Ondruš (c)
RB	5	Ján Pivarník
CB	12	Koloman Gögh
LB	3	Jozef Čapkovič
CM	2	Karol Dobiaš	(yellow card) 55'	(substituted off) 94'
CM	8	Jozef Móder	(yellow card) 59'
AM	7	Antonín Panenka
RW	10	Marián Masný
LW	11	Zdeněk Nehoda
CF	17	Ján Švehlík		(substituted off) 79'
Substitutions:
DF	6	Ladislav Jurkemik		(substituted on) 79'
MF	16	František Veselý		(substituted on) 94'
Manager:
Václav Ježek

GK	1	Sepp Maier
SW	5	Franz Beckenbauer (c)
RB	2	Berti Vogts
CB	4	Hans-Georg Schwarzenbeck
LB	3	Bernard Dietz
CM	7	Rainer Bonhof
CM	6	Herbert Wimmer	(substituted off) 46'
AM	10	Erich Beer	(substituted off) 80'
RW	8	Uli Hoeneß
LW	11	Bernd Hölzenbein
CF	9	Dieter Müller
Substitutions:
MF	15	Heinz Flohe	(substituted on) 46'
MF	14	Hans Bongartz	(substituted on) 80'
Manager:
Helmut Schön

== See also ==
- Czech Republic at the UEFA European Championship
- Germany at the UEFA European Championship
- Netherlands at the UEFA European Championship
- Slovakia at the UEFA European Championship
- Yugoslavia at the UEFA European Championship
