= Czechoslovakia at the UEFA European Championship =

International football delegation

Czechoslovakia participated in the UEFA European Championship three times: 1960, 1976 (which it won), and 1980. UEFA and FIFA have recognized both the Czech Republic and Slovakia as joint and equal successors to Czechoslovakia.

== Overall record ==
UEFA European Championship record										Qualifying record						
Year	Result	Position	Pld	W	D	L	GF	GA	Squad	Pld	W	D	L	GF	GA	—
(France) 1960	Third place	3rd	2	1	0	1	2	3	Squad	6	4	1	1	16	5	1960
(Spain) 1964	Did not qualify									2	0	1	1	2	3	1964
(Italy) 1968	Did not qualify									6	3	1	2	8	4	1968
(Belgium) 1972	Did not qualify									6	4	1	1	11	4	1972
(Socialist Federal Republic of Yugoslavia) 1976	Champions	1st	2	1	1	0	5	3	Squad	8	5	2	1	19	7	1976
(Italy) 1980	Third place	3rd	4	1	2	1	5	4	Squad	6	5	0	1	17	4	1980
(France) 1984	Did not qualify									8	3	4	1	15	7	1984
(West Germany) 1988	Did not qualify									6	2	3	1	7	5	1988
(Sweden) 1992	Did not qualify									8	5	0	3	12	9	1992
Total	1 Title	3/9	8	3	3	2	12	10	—	56	31	13	12	107	48	—

== 1960 European Nations' Cup ==
=== Final tournament ===
Semi-finals

6 July 1960
21:30

Czechoslovakia	0–3	Soviet Union
	Report	Ivanov 34', 56'; Ponedelnik 66'

Stade Vélodrome, Marseille
Attendance: 25,184
Referee: Cesare Jonni (Italy)

Third place play-off

9 July 1960
21:30

Czechoslovakia	2–0	France
Bubník 58'; Pavlovič 88'	Report

Stade Vélodrome, Marseille
Attendance: 9,438
Referee: Cesare Jonni (Italy)

== Euro 1976 ==
=== Final tournament ===
Semi-finals

16 June 1976
20:15

Czechoslovakia	3–1 (a.e.t.)	Netherlands
Ondruš 19'; Nehoda 114'; Veselý 118'	Report	Ondruš 73' (o.g.)

Stadion Maksimir, Zagreb
Attendance: 17,879
Referee: Clive Thomas (Wales)

Final

20 June 1976
20:15

Czechoslovakia	2–2 (a.e.t.)	West Germany
Švehlík 8'; Dobiaš 25'	Report; Positions	Müller 28'; Hölzenbein 89'
Penalties
Masný (penalty scored); Nehoda (penalty scored); Ondruš (penalty scored); Jurkemik (penalty scored); Panenka (penalty scored)	5–3	(penalty scored) Bonhof; (penalty scored) Flohe; (penalty scored) Bongartz; (penalty missed) Hoeneß

Red Star Stadium, Belgrade
Attendance: 30,790
Referee: Sergio Gonella (Italy)

== Euro 1980 ==
=== Group stage ===
Pos	Team	Pld	W	D	L	GF	GA	GD	Pts	Qualification
1	West Germany	3	2	1	0	4	2	+2	5	Advance to final
2	Czechoslovakia	3	1	1	1	4	3	+1	3	Advance to third place play-off
3	Netherlands	3	1	1	1	4	4	0	3	
4	Greece	3	0	1	2	1	4	−3	1	

Source: UEFA
Rules for classification: Group stage tiebreakers
11 June 1980
17:45

Czechoslovakia	0–1	West Germany
	Report	Rummenigge 57'

Stadio Olimpico, Rome
Attendance: 10,500
Referee: Alberto Michelotti (Italy)

14 June 1980
20:30

Greece	1–3	Czechoslovakia
Anastopoulos 14'	Report	Panenka 6'; Vízek 26'; Nehoda 63'

Stadio Olimpico, Rome
Attendance: 7,614
Referee: Pat Partridge (England)

17 June 1980
17:45

Netherlands	1–1	Czechoslovakia
Kist 59'	Report	Nehoda 16'

San Siro, Milan
Attendance: 11,889
Referee: Hilmi Ok (Turkey)

=== Knockout stage ===
Third place play-off

21 June 1980
20:30

Czechoslovakia	1–1	Italy
Jurkemik 54'	Report	Graziani 73'
Penalties
Masný (penalty scored); Nehoda (penalty scored); Ondruš (penalty scored); Jurkemik (penalty scored); Panenka (penalty scored); Gögh (penalty scored); Gajdůšek (penalty scored); Kozák (penalty scored); Barmoš (penalty scored)	9–8	(penalty scored) Causio; (penalty scored) Altobelli; (penalty scored) G. Baresi; (penalty scored) Cabrini; (penalty scored) Benetti; (penalty scored) Graziani; (penalty scored) Scirea; (penalty scored) Tardelli; (penalty missed) Collovati

Stadio San Paolo, Naples
Attendance: 24,652
Referee: Erich Linemayr (Austria)

== See also ==
- Czech Republic at the UEFA European Championship
- Slovakia at the UEFA European Championship

== Bibliography ==
- Kier, Richard (2018). The European Championship – A Complete History (Part 1: 1960–1976). Rowanvale Books Ltd. ISBN 978-1-9115-6967-1.

== Head-to-head record ==
Opponent	Pld	W	D	L	GF	GA	GD	Win %
France	1	1	0	0	2	0	+2	100.00
Germany	2	0	1	1	2	3	−1	0.00
Greece	1	1	0	0	3	1	+2	100.00
Italy	1	0	1	0	1	1	+0	0.00
Netherlands	2	1	1	0	4	2	+2	50.00
Russia	1	0	0	1	0	3	−3	0.00
Total	8	3	3	2	12	10	+2	37.50
