= Germany at the UEFA European Championship =

International football delegation

The UEFA European Championship is the main football competition of the men's national football teams governed by UEFA (the Union of European Football Associations). Held every four years since 1960, in the even-numbered year between FIFA World Cup tournaments, it was originally called the UEFA European Nations' Cup, changing to the current name in 1968.

Starting with the 1996 tournament, specific championships are often referred to in the form "UEFA Euro XXXX". Prior to entering the tournament all teams other than the host nations (which qualify automatically) compete in a qualifying process.

Germany have participated in fourteen European Championships, five of which were as West Germany and nine of which were as (unified) Germany. By doing so, the nation holds the record of most participations in the competition's history.

Germany are holders of three European titles, won in 1972 in Belgium, in 1980 in Italy, and in 1996 in England. The team have finished out of the top eight on only three occasions, in the 2000, 2004 and 2020 tournaments. They have reached at least the semi-finals on nine occasions, an unparalleled record in the competition.

== Overall record ==
=== History ===
- 1960–1988 as West Germany
- 1992–present as Germany

Champions Runners-up Third place Tournament played fully or partially on home soil

UEFA European Championship record										Qualification record						
Year	Round	Position	Pld	W	D*	L	GF	GA	Squad	Pld	W	D	L	GF	GA	Campaign
(France) 1960	Did not enter									Did not enter						
(Spain) 1964	Did not enter									Did not enter						
(Italy) 1968	Did not qualify									4	2	1	1	9	2	1968
(Belgium) 1972	Champions	1st	2	2	0	0	5	1	Squad	8	5	3	0	13	3	1972
(Socialist Federal Republic of Yugoslavia) 1976	Runners-up	2nd	2	1	1*	0	6	4	Squad	8	4	4	0	17	5	1976
(Italy) 1980	Champions	1st	4	3	1	0	6	3	Squad	6	4	2	0	17	1	1980
(France) 1984	Group stage	5th	3	1	1	1	2	2	Squad	8	5	1	2	15	5	1984
(West Germany) 1988	Semi-finals	3rd	4	2	1	1	6	3	Squad	Qualified as hosts						
(Sweden) 1992	Runners-up	2nd	5	2	1	2	7	8	Squad	6	5	0	1	13	4	1992
(England) 1996	Champions	1st	6	4	2*	0	10	3	Squad	10	8	1	1	27	10	1996
(Belgium) (Netherlands) 2000	Group stage	15th	3	0	1	2	1	5	Squad	8	6	1	1	20	4	2000
(Portugal) 2004	Group stage	12th	3	0	2	1	2	3	Squad	8	5	3	0	13	4	2004
(Austria) (Switzerland) 2008	Runners-up	2nd	6	4	0	2	10	7	Squad	12	8	3	1	35	7	2008
(Poland) (Ukraine) 2012	Semi-finals	3rd	5	4	0	1	10	6	Squad	10	10	0	0	34	7	2012
(France) 2016	Semi-finals	3rd	6	3	2*	1	7	3	Squad	10	7	1	2	24	9	2016
(Europe) 2020	Round of 16	15th	4	1	1	2	6	7	Squad	8	7	0	1	30	7	2020
(Germany) 2024	Quarter-finals	5th	5	3	1	1	11	4	Squad	Qualified as hosts						
(United Kingdom) (Republic of Ireland) 2028	To be determined									To be determined						2028
(Italy) (Turkey) 2032	To be determined									To be determined						2032
Total	3 Titles	14/17	58	30	14*	14	89	59	—	106	76	20	10	267	68	Total

* Denotes draws include knockout matches decided via penalty shoot-out.

=== Winning campaigns ===
Year	Manager	Captain	Final goalscorer(s)
1972	Helmut Schön	Franz Beckenbauer	Gerd Müller (2), Herbert Wimmer
1980	Jupp Derwall	Bernard Dietz	Horst Hrubesch (2)
1996	Berti Vogts	Jürgen Klinsmann	Oliver Bierhoff (2)

== List of matches ==
Year	Round	Opponent	Score	Germany scorer(s)
1972	Semi-finals	Belgium	2–1	G. Müller (2)
1972	Final	Soviet Union	3–0	G. Müller (2), Wimmer
1976	Semi-finals	Yugoslavia	4–2 (a.e.t.)	Flohe, D. Müller (3)
1976	Final	Czechoslovakia	2–2 (a.e.t.) (3–5 p)	D. Müller, Hölzenbein
1980	Group 1	Czechoslovakia	1–0	Rummenigge
1980	Group 1	Netherlands	3–2	Allofs (3)
1980	Group 1	Greece	0–0	—
1980	Final	Belgium	2–1	Hrubesch (2)
1984	Group 2	Portugal	0–0	—
1984	Group 2	Romania	2–1	Völler (2)
1984	Group 2	Spain	0–1	—
1988	Group 1	Italy	1–1	Brehme
1988	Group 1	Denmark	2–0	Klinsmann, Thon
1988	Group 1	Spain	2–0	Völler (2)
1988	Semi-finals	Netherlands	1–2	Matthäus
1992	Group 2	CIS	1–1	Häßler
1992	Group 2	Scotland	2–0	Riedle, Effenberg
1992	Group 2	Netherlands	1–3	Klinsmann
1992	Semi-finals	Sweden	3–2	Häßler, Riedle (2)
1992	Final	Denmark	0–2	—
1996	Group C	Czech Republic	2–0	Ziege, Möller
1996	Group C	Russia	3–0	Sammer, Klinsmann (2)
1996	Group C	Italy	0–0	—
1996	Quarter-finals	Croatia	2–1	Klinsmann, Sammer
1996	Semi-finals	England	1–1 (a.e.t.) (6–5 p)	Kuntz
1996	Final	Czech Republic	2–1 (a.e.t.)	Bierhoff (2)
2000	Group A	Romania	1–1	Scholl
2000	Group A	England	0–1	—
2000	Group A	Portugal	0–3	—
2004	Group D	Netherlands	1–1	Frings
2004	Group D	Latvia	0–0	—
2004	Group D	Czech Republic	1–2	Ballack
2008	Group B	Poland	2–0	Podolski (2)
2008	Group B	Croatia	1–2	Podolski
2008	Group B	Austria	1–0	Ballack
2008	Quarter-finals	Portugal	3–2	Schweinsteiger, Klose, Ballack
2008	Semi-finals	Turkey	3–2	Schweinsteiger, Klose, Lahm
2008	Final	Spain	0–1	—
2012	Group B	Portugal	1–0	Gómez
2012	Group B	Netherlands	2–1	Gómez (2)
2012	Group B	Denmark	2–1	Podolski, Bender
2012	Quarter-finals	Greece	4–2	Lahm, Khedira, Klose, Reus
2012	Semi-finals	Italy	1–2	Özil
2016	Group C	Ukraine	2–0	Mustafi, Schweinsteiger
2016	Group C	Poland	0–0	—
2016	Group C	Northern Ireland	1–0	Gómez
2016	Round of 16	Slovakia	3–0	Boateng, Gómez, Draxler
2016	Quarter-finals	Italy	1–1 (a.e.t.) (6–5 p)	Özil
2016	Semi-finals	France	0–2	—
2020	Group F	France	0–1	—
2020	Group F	Portugal	4–2	Dias (o.g.), Guerreiro (o.g.), Havertz, Gosens
2020	Group F	Hungary	2–2	Havertz, Goretzka
2020	Round of 16	England	0–2	—
2024	Group A	Scotland	5–1	Wirtz, Musiala, Havertz, Füllkrug, Can
2024	Group A	Hungary	2–0	Musiala, Gündoğan
2024	Group A	Switzerland	1–1	Füllkrug
2024	Round of 16	Denmark	2–0	Havertz, Musiala
2024	Quarter-finals	Spain	1–2 (a.e.t.)	Wirtz

== Head-to-head record ==
Opponent	Pld	W	D	L	GF	GA
Austria	1	1	0	0	1	0
Belgium	2	2	0	0	4	2
CIS	1	0	1	0	1	1
Croatia	2	1	0	1	3	3
Czech Republic	3	2	0	1	5	3
Czechoslovakia	2	1	1	0	3	2
Denmark	4	3	0	1	6	3
England	3	0	1	2	1	4
France	2	0	0	2	0	3
Greece	2	1	1	0	4	2
Hungary	2	1	1	0	4	2
Italy	4	0	3	1	3	4
Latvia	1	0	1	0	0	0
Netherlands	5	2	1	2	8	9
Northern Ireland	1	1	0	0	1	0
Poland	2	1	1	0	2	0
Portugal	5	3	1	1	8	7
Romania	2	1	1	0	3	2
Russia	1	1	0	0	3	0
Scotland	2	2	0	0	7	1
Slovakia	1	1	0	0	3	0
Soviet Union	1	1	0	0	3	0
Spain	4	1	0	3	3	4
Sweden	1	1	0	0	3	2
Switzerland	1	0	1	0	1	1
Turkey	1	1	0	0	3	2
Ukraine	1	1	0	0	2	0
Yugoslavia	1	1	0	0	4	2
Total	58	30	14	14	89	59

== UEFA Euro 1972 ==
=== Final tournament ===
Semi-finals

14 June 1972
20:00

Belgium	1–2	West Germany
Polleunis 83'	Report	Müller 24', 71'

Bosuilstadion, Antwerp
Attendance: 55,669
Referee: William Mullan (Scotland)

Final

18 June 1972
16:00

West Germany	3–0	Soviet Union
Müller 27', 58'; Wimmer 52'	Report

Heysel Stadium, Brussels
Attendance: 43,437
Referee: Ferdinand Marschall (Austria)

== UEFA Euro 1976 ==
=== Final tournament ===
Semi-finals

17 June 1976
20:15

Yugoslavia	2–4 (a.e.t.)	West Germany
Popivoda 19'; Džajić 30'	Report	Flohe 64'; Müller 82', 115', 119'

Red Star Stadium, Belgrade
Attendance: 50,652
Referee: Alfred Delcourt (Belgium)

Final

20 June 1976
20:15

Czechoslovakia	2–2 (a.e.t.)	West Germany
Švehlík 8'; Dobiaš 25'	Report; Positions	Müller 28'; Hölzenbein 89'
Penalties
Masný (penalty scored); Nehoda (penalty scored); Ondruš (penalty scored); Jurkemik (penalty scored); Panenka (penalty scored)	5–3	(penalty scored) Bonhof; (penalty scored) Flohe; (penalty scored) Bongartz; (penalty missed) Hoeneß

Red Star Stadium, Belgrade
Attendance: 30,790
Referee: Sergio Gonella (Italy)

== UEFA Euro 1980 ==
=== Group stage ===
Pos	Team	Pld	W	D	L	GF	GA	GD	Pts	Qualification
1	West Germany	3	2	1	0	4	2	+2	5	Advance to final
2	Czechoslovakia	3	1	1	1	4	3	+1	3	Advance to third place play-off
3	Netherlands	3	1	1	1	4	4	0	3	
4	Greece	3	0	1	2	1	4	−3	1	

Source: UEFA
Rules for classification: Group stage tiebreakers
11 June 1980
17:45

Czechoslovakia	0–1	West Germany
	Report	Rummenigge 57'

Stadio Olimpico, Rome
Attendance: 10,500
Referee: Alberto Michelotti (Italy)

14 June 1980
17:45

West Germany	3–2	Netherlands
Allofs 20', 60', 65'	Report	Rep 79' (pen.); W. van de Kerkhof 85'

Stadio San Paolo, Naples
Attendance: 29,889
Referee: Robert Wurtz (France)

17 June 1980
20:30

Greece	0–0	West Germany
	Report

Stadio Comunale, Turin
Attendance: 13,901
Referee: Brian McGinlay (Scotland)

=== Knockout stage ===
Final

22 June 1980
20:30

Belgium	1–2	West Germany
Vandereycken 75' (pen.)	Report	Hrubesch 10', 88'

Stadio Olimpico, Rome
Attendance: 47,860
Referee: Nicolae Rainea (Romania)

== UEFA Euro 1984 ==
=== Group stage ===
Pos	Team	Pld	W	D	L	GF	GA	GD	Pts	Qualification
1	Spain	3	1	2	0	3	2	+1	4	Advance to knockout stage
2	Portugal	3	1	2	0	2	1	+1	4	Advance to knockout stage
3	West Germany	3	1	1	1	2	2	0	3	
4	Romania	3	0	1	2	2	4	−2	1	

Source: UEFA
Rules for classification: Group stage tiebreakers
14 June 1984
17:15

West Germany	0–0	Portugal
	Report

Stade de la Meinau, Strasbourg
Attendance: 44,707
Referee: Romualdas Juška (Soviet Union)

17 June 1984
17:15

West Germany	2–1	Romania
Völler 25', 66'	Report	Coraș 46'

Stade Félix-Bollaert, Lens
Attendance: 31,787
Referee: Jan Keizer (Netherlands)

20 June 1984
20:30

West Germany	0–1	Spain
	Report	Maceda 90'

Parc des Princes, Paris
Attendance: 47,691
Referee: Vojtech Christov (Czechoslovakia)

== UEFA Euro 1988 ==
=== Group stage ===
Pos	Team	Pld	W	D	L	GF	GA	GD	Pts	Qualification
1	West Germany (H)	3	2	1	0	5	1	+4	5	Advance to knockout stage
2	Italy	3	2	1	0	4	1	+3	5	Advance to knockout stage
3	Spain	3	1	0	2	3	5	−2	2	
4	Denmark	3	0	0	3	2	7	−5	0	

Source: UEFA
Rules for classification: Group stage tiebreakers
(H) Hosts
10 June 1988
20:15

West Germany	1–1	Italy
Brehme 55'	Report	Mancini 52'

Rheinstadion, Düsseldorf
Attendance: 62,552
Referee: Keith Hackett (England)

14 June 1988
17:15

West Germany	2–0	Denmark
Klinsmann 10'; Thon 85'	Report

Parkstadion, Gelsenkirchen
Attendance: 64,812
Referee: Bob Valentine (Scotland)

17 June 1988
20:15

West Germany	2–0	Spain
Völler 29', 51'	Report

Olympiastadion, Munich
Attendance: 63,802
Referee: Michel Vautrot (France)

=== Knockout stage ===
Semi-finals

21 June 1988
20:15

West Germany	1–2	Netherlands
Matthäus 55' (pen.)	Report	R. Koeman 74' (pen.); Van Basten 88'

Volksparkstadion, Hamburg
Attendance: 56,115
Referee: Ioan Igna (Romania)

== UEFA Euro 1992 ==
=== Group stage ===
Pos	Team	Pld	W	D	L	GF	GA	GD	Pts	Qualification
1	Netherlands	3	2	1	0	4	1	+3	5	Advance to knockout stage
2	Germany	3	1	1	1	4	4	0	3	Advance to knockout stage
3	Scotland	3	1	0	2	3	3	0	2	
4	CIS	3	0	2	1	1	4	−3	2	

Source: UEFA
Rules for classification: Group stage tiebreakers
12 June 1992
20:15

CIS	1–1	Germany
Dobrovolski 64' (pen.)	Report	Häßler 90'

Idrottsparken, Norrköping
Attendance: 17,410
Referee: Gérard Biguet (France)

15 June 1992
17:15

Scotland	0–2	Germany
	Report	Riedle 29'; Effenberg 47'

Idrottsparken, Norrköping
Attendance: 17,638
Referee: Guy Goethals (Belgium)

18 June 1992
20:15

Netherlands	3–1	Germany
Rijkaard 4'; Witschge 15'; Bergkamp 72'	Report	Klinsmann 53'

Ullevi, Gothenburg
Attendance: 37,725
Referee: Pierluigi Pairetto (Italy)

=== Knockout stage ===
Semi-finals

21 June 1992
20:15

Sweden	2–3	Germany
Brolin 64' (pen.); K. Andersson 89'	Report	Häßler 11'; Riedle 59', 88'

Råsunda Stadium, Solna
Attendance: 28,827
Referee: Tullio Lanese (Italy)

Final

26 June 1992
20:15

Denmark	2–0	Germany
Jensen 18'; Vilfort 78'	Report

Ullevi, Gothenburg
Attendance: 37,800
Referee: Bruno Galler (Switzerland)

== UEFA Euro 1996 ==
=== Group stage ===
Pos	Team	Pld	W	D	L	GF	GA	GD	Pts	Qualification
1	Germany	3	2	1	0	5	0	+5	7	Advance to knockout stage
2	Czech Republic	3	1	1	1	5	6	−1	4 (Note: Head-to-head result: Czech Republic 2–1 Italy.)	Advance to knockout stage
3	Italy	3	1	1	1	3	3	0	4	
4	Russia	3	0	1	2	4	8	−4	1	

Source: UEFA
Rules for classification: Group stage tiebreakers
Notes:
9 June 1996
17:00

Germany	2–0	Czech Republic
Ziege 26'; Möller 32'	Report

Old Trafford, Manchester
Attendance: 37,300
Referee: David Elleray (England)

16 June 1996
15:00

Russia	0–3	Germany
	Report	Sammer 56'; Klinsmann 77', 90'

Old Trafford, Manchester
Attendance: 50,760
Referee: Kim Milton Nielsen (Denmark)

19 June 1996
19:30

Italy	0–0	Germany
	Report

Old Trafford, Manchester
Attendance: 53,740
Referee: Guy Goethals (Belgium)

=== Knockout stage ===
Quarter-finals

23 June 1996
15:00

Germany	2–1	Croatia
Klinsmann 20' (pen.); Sammer 59'	Report	Šuker 51'

Old Trafford, Manchester
Attendance: 43,412
Referee: Leif Sundell (Sweden)

Semi-finals

26 June 1996
19:30

Germany	1–1 (a.e.t.)	England
Kuntz 16'	Report	Shearer 3'
Penalties
Häßler (penalty scored); Strunz (penalty scored); Reuter (penalty scored); Ziege (penalty scored); Kuntz (penalty scored); Möller (penalty scored)	6–5	(penalty scored) Shearer; (penalty scored) Platt; (penalty scored) Pearce; (penalty scored) Gascoigne; (penalty scored) Sheringham; (penalty missed) Southgate

Wembley Stadium, London
Attendance: 75,862
Referee: Sándor Puhl (Hungary)

Final

30 June 1996
19:00

Czech Republic	1–2 (a.e.t./g.g.)	Germany
Berger 59' (pen.)	Report	Bierhoff 73', 95'

Wembley Stadium, London
Attendance: 73,611
Referee: Pierluigi Pairetto (Italy)

== UEFA Euro 2000 ==
=== Group stage ===
Pos	Team	Pld	W	D	L	GF	GA	GD	Pts	Qualification
1	Portugal	3	3	0	0	7	2	+5	9	Advance to knockout stage
2	Romania	3	1	1	1	4	4	0	4	Advance to knockout stage
3	England	3	1	0	2	5	6	−1	3	
4	Germany	3	0	1	2	1	5	−4	1	

Source: UEFA
Rules for classification: Group stage tiebreakers
12 June 2000
18:00

Germany	1–1	Romania
Scholl 28'	Report	Moldovan 5'

Stade Maurice Dufrasne, Liège
Attendance: 28,500
Referee: Kim Milton Nielsen (Denmark)

17 June 2000
20:45

England	1–0	Germany
Shearer 53'	Report

Stade du Pays de Charleroi, Charleroi
Attendance: 29,000
Referee: Pierluigi Collina (Italy)

20 June 2000
20:45

Portugal	3–0	Germany
Conceição 35', 54', 71'	Report

Feijenoord Stadion, Rotterdam
Attendance: 44,000
Referee: Dick Jol (Netherlands)

== UEFA Euro 2004 ==
=== Group stage ===
Pos	Team	Pld	W	D	L	GF	GA	GD	Pts	Qualification
1	Czech Republic	3	3	0	0	7	4	+3	9	Advance to knockout stage
2	Netherlands	3	1	1	1	6	4	+2	4	Advance to knockout stage
3	Germany	3	0	2	1	2	3	−1	2	
4	Latvia	3	0	1	2	1	5	−4	1	

Source: UEFA
Rules for classification: Group stage tiebreakers
15 June 2004
19:45

Germany	1–1	Netherlands
Frings 30'	Report	Van Nistelrooy 81'

Estádio do Dragão, Porto
Attendance: 48,197
Referee: Anders Frisk (Sweden)

19 June 2004
17:00

Latvia	0–0	Germany
	Report

Estádio do Bessa, Porto
Attendance: 22,344
Referee: Mike Riley (England)

23 June 2004
19:45

Germany	1–2	Czech Republic
Ballack 21'	Report	Heinz 30'; Baroš 77'

Estádio José Alvalade, Lisbon
Attendance: 46,849
Referee: Terje Hauge (Norway)

== UEFA Euro 2008 ==
=== Group stage ===
Pos	Team	Pld	W	D	L	GF	GA	GD	Pts	Qualification
1	Croatia	3	3	0	0	4	1	+3	9	Advance to knockout stage
2	Germany	3	2	0	1	4	2	+2	6	Advance to knockout stage
3	Austria (H)	3	0	1	2	1	3	−2	1 (Note: Tied on head-to-head result (Austria 1–1 Poland). Overall goal difference was used as the tiebreaker.)	
4	Poland	3	0	1	2	1	4	−3	1	

Source: UEFA
Rules for classification: Group stage tiebreakers
(H) Hosts
Notes:
8 June 2008
20:45

Germany	2–0	Poland
Podolski 20', 72'	Report

Wörthersee Stadion, Klagenfurt
Attendance: 30,461
Referee: Tom Henning Øvrebø (Norway)

12 June 2008
18:00

Croatia	2–1	Germany
Srna 24'; Olić 62'	Report	Podolski 79'

Wörthersee Stadion, Klagenfurt
Attendance: 30,461
Referee: Frank De Bleeckere (Belgium)

16 June 2008
20:45

Austria	0–1	Germany
	Report	Ballack 49'

Ernst-Happel-Stadion, Vienna
Attendance: 51,428
Referee: Manuel Mejuto González (Spain)

=== Knockout stage ===
Quarter-finals

19 June 2008
20:45

Portugal	2–3	Germany
Nuno Gomes 40'; Postiga 87'	Report	Schweinsteiger 22'; Klose 26'; Ballack 61'

St. Jakob-Park, Basel
Attendance: 39,374
Referee: Peter Fröjdfeldt (Sweden)

Semi-finals

25 June 2008
20:45

Germany	3–2	Turkey
Schweinsteiger 26'; Klose 79'; Lahm 90'	Report	Boral 22'; Şentürk 86'

St. Jakob-Park, Basel
Attendance: 39,374
Referee: Massimo Busacca (Switzerland)

Final

29 June 2008
20:45

Germany	0–1	Spain
	Report	Torres 33'

Ernst-Happel-Stadion, Vienna
Attendance: 51,428
Referee: Roberto Rosetti (Italy)

== UEFA Euro 2012 ==
=== Group stage ===
Pos	Team	Pld	W	D	L	GF	GA	GD	Pts	Qualification
1	Germany	3	3	0	0	5	2	+3	9	Advance to knockout stage
2	Portugal	3	2	0	1	5	4	+1	6	Advance to knockout stage
3	Denmark	3	1	0	2	4	5	−1	3	
4	Netherlands	3	0	0	3	2	5	−3	0	

Source: UEFA
Rules for classification: Group stage tiebreakers
9 June 2012
21:45 EEST

Germany	1–0	Portugal
Gómez 72'	Report

Arena Lviv, Lviv
Attendance: 32,990
Referee: Stéphane Lannoy (France)

13 June 2012
21:45 EEST

Netherlands	1–2	Germany
Van Persie 73'	Report	Gómez 24', 38'

Metalist Stadium, Kharkiv
Attendance: 37,750
Referee: Jonas Eriksson (Sweden)

17 June 2012
21:45 EEST

Denmark	1–2	Germany
Krohn-Dehli 24'	Report	Podolski 19'; Bender 80'

Arena Lviv, Lviv
Attendance: 32,990
Referee: Carlos Velasco Carballo (Spain)

=== Knockout stage ===
Quarter-finals

22 June 2012
20:45 CEST

Germany	4–2	Greece
Lahm 39'; Khedira 61'; Klose 68'; Reus 74'	Report	Samaras 55'; Salpingidis 89' (pen.)

PGE Arena, Gdańsk
Attendance: 38,751
Referee: Damir Skomina (Slovenia)

Semi-finals

28 June 2012
20:45 CEST

Germany	1–2	Italy
Özil 90+2' (pen.)	Report	Balotelli 20', 36'

National Stadium, Warsaw
Attendance: 55,540
Referee: Stéphane Lannoy (France)

== UEFA Euro 2016 ==
=== Group stage ===
Pos	Team	Pld	W	D	L	GF	GA	GD	Pts	Qualification
1	Germany	3	2	1	0	3	0	+3	7 (Note: Tied on head-to-head result (Germany 0–0 Poland). Overall goal difference was used as the tiebreaker.)	Advance to knockout stage
2	Poland	3	2	1	0	2	0	+2	7	Advance to knockout stage
3	Northern Ireland	3	1	0	2	2	2	0	3	Advance to knockout stage
4	Ukraine	3	0	0	3	0	5	−5	0	

Source: UEFA
Rules for classification: Group stage tiebreakers
Notes:
12 June 2016
21:00

Germany	2–0	Ukraine
Mustafi 19'; Schweinsteiger 90+2'	Report

Stade Pierre-Mauroy, Villeneuve-d'Ascq
Attendance: 43,035
Referee: Martin Atkinson (England)

16 June 2016
21:00

Germany	0–0	Poland
	Report

Stade de France, Saint-Denis
Attendance: 73,648
Referee: Björn Kuipers (Netherlands)

21 June 2016
18:00

Northern Ireland	0–1	Germany
	Report	Gómez 30'

Parc des Princes, Paris
Attendance: 44,125
Referee: Clément Turpin (France)

=== Knockout stage ===
Round of 16

26 June 2016
18:00

Germany	3–0	Slovakia
Boateng 8'; Gómez 43'; Draxler 63'	Report

Stade Pierre-Mauroy, Villeneuve-d'Ascq
Attendance: 44,312
Referee: Szymon Marciniak (Poland)

Quarter-finals

2 July 2016
21:00

Germany	1–1 (a.e.t.)	Italy
Özil 65'	Report	Bonucci 78' (pen.)
Penalties
Kroos (penalty scored); Müller (penalty missed); Özil (penalty missed); Draxler (penalty scored); Schweinsteiger (penalty missed); Hummels (penalty scored); Kimmich (penalty scored); Boateng (penalty scored); Hector (penalty scored)	6–5	(penalty scored) Insigne; (penalty missed) Zaza; (penalty scored) Barzagli; (penalty missed) Pellè; (penalty missed) Bonucci; (penalty scored) Giaccherini; (penalty scored) Parolo; (penalty scored) De Sciglio; (penalty missed) Darmian

Stade de Bordeaux, Bordeaux
Attendance: 38,764
Referee: Viktor Kassai (Hungary)

Semi-finals

7 July 2016
21:00

Germany	0–2	France
	Report	Griezmann 45+2' (pen.), 72'

Stade Vélodrome, Marseille
Attendance: 64,078
Referee: Nicola Rizzoli (Italy)

== UEFA Euro 2020 ==
=== Group stage ===
Pos	Team	Pld	W	D	L	GF	GA	GD	Pts	Qualification
1	France	3	1	2	0	4	3	+1	5	Advance to knockout stage
2	Germany (H)	3	1	1	1	6	5	+1	4 (Note: Head-to-head result: Portugal 2–4 Germany.)	Advance to knockout stage
3	Portugal	3	1	1	1	7	6	+1	4	Advance to knockout stage
4	Hungary (H)	3	0	2	1	3	6	−3	2	

Source: UEFA
Rules for classification: Group stage tiebreakers
(H) Hosts
Notes:
15 June 2021
21:00

France	1–0	Germany
Hummels 20' (o.g.)	Report

Allianz Arena, Munich
Attendance: 13,000
Referee: Carlos del Cerro Grande (Spain)

19 June 2021
18:00

Portugal	2–4	Germany
Ronaldo 15'; Jota 67'	Report	Dias 35' (o.g.); Guerreiro 39' (o.g.); Havertz 51'; Gosens 60'

Allianz Arena, Munich
Attendance: 12,926
Referee: Anthony Taylor (England)

23 June 2021
21:00

Germany	2–2	Hungary
Havertz 66'; Goretzka 84'	Report	Ád. Szalai 11'; Schäfer 68'

Allianz Arena, Munich
Attendance: 12,413
Referee: Sergei Karasev (Russia)

=== Knockout stage ===
Round of 16

29 June 2021
18:00 (17:00 UTC+1)

England	2–0	Germany
Sterling 75'; Kane 86'	Report

Wembley Stadium, London
Attendance: 41,973
Referee: Danny Makkelie (Netherlands)

== UEFA Euro 2024 ==
=== Group stage ===
Pos	Team	Pld	W	D	L	GF	GA	GD	Pts	Qualification
1	Germany (H)	3	2	1	0	8	2	+6	7	Advance to knockout stage
2	Switzerland	3	1	2	0	5	3	+2	5	Advance to knockout stage
3	Hungary	3	1	0	2	2	5	−3	3	
4	Scotland	3	0	1	2	2	7	−5	1	

Source: UEFA
(H) Hosts
14 June 2024
21:00

Germany	5–1	Scotland
Wirtz 10'; Musiala 19'; Havertz 45+1' (pen.); Füllkrug 68'; Can 90+3'	Report	Rüdiger 87' (o.g.)

Allianz Arena, Munich
Attendance: 65,052
Referee: Clément Turpin (France)

19 June 2024
18:00

Germany	2–0	Hungary
Musiala 22'; Gündoğan 67'	Report

MHPArena, Stuttgart
Attendance: 54,000
Referee: Danny Makkelie (Netherlands)

23 June 2024
21:00

Switzerland	1–1	Germany
Ndoye 28'	Report	Füllkrug 90+2'

Waldstadion, Frankfurt
Attendance: 46,685
Referee: Daniele Orsato (Italy)

=== Knockout stage ===
Round of 16

29 June 2024
21:00

Germany	2–0	Denmark
Havertz 53' (pen.); Musiala 68'	Report

Westfalenstadion, Dortmund
Attendance: 61,612
Referee: Michael Oliver (England)

Quarter-finals

5 July 2024
18:00

Spain	2–1 (a.e.t.)	Germany
Olmo 51'; Merino 119'	Report	Wirtz 89'

MHPArena, Stuttgart
Attendance: 54,000
Referee: Anthony Taylor (England)

== Most appearances ==
Rank	Player	Matches	Years
1	Manuel Neuer	20	2012, 2016, 2020, 2024
2	Toni Kroos	19	2012, 2016, 2020, 2024
3	Bastian Schweinsteiger	18	2004, 2008, 2012, 2016
4	Thomas Müller	17	2012, 2016, 2020, 2024
5	Philipp Lahm	14	2004, 2008, 2012
6	Mario Gómez	13	2008, 2012, 2016
6	Thomas Häßler	13	1992, 1996, 2000
6	Mats Hummels	13	2012, 2016, 2020
6	Joshua Kimmich	13	2016, 2020, 2024
6	Jürgen Klinsmann	13	1988, 1992, 1996
6	Miroslav Klose	13	2004, 2008, 2012

== Top goalscorers ==
Rank	Player	Goals	Years (goals)
1	Mario Gómez	5	2012 (3), 2016 (2)
1	Jürgen Klinsmann	5	1988, 1992, 1996 (3)
3	Kai Havertz	4	2020 (2), 2024 (2)
3	Dieter Müller	4	1976 (4)
3	Gerd Müller	4	1972 (4)
3	Lukas Podolski	4	2008 (3), 2012
3	Rudi Völler	4	1984 (2), 1988 (2)
8	Klaus Allofs	3	1980 (3)
8	Michael Ballack	3	2004, 2008 (2)
8	Miroslav Klose	3	2008 (2), 2012
8	Jamal Musiala	3	2024 (3)
8	Karl-Heinz Riedle	3	1992 (3)
8	Bastian Schweinsteiger	3	2008 (2), 2016

== See also ==
- Germany at the FIFA Confederations Cup
- Germany at the FIFA World Cup
