= Václav Ježek =

Czechoslovak football manager (1923–1995)

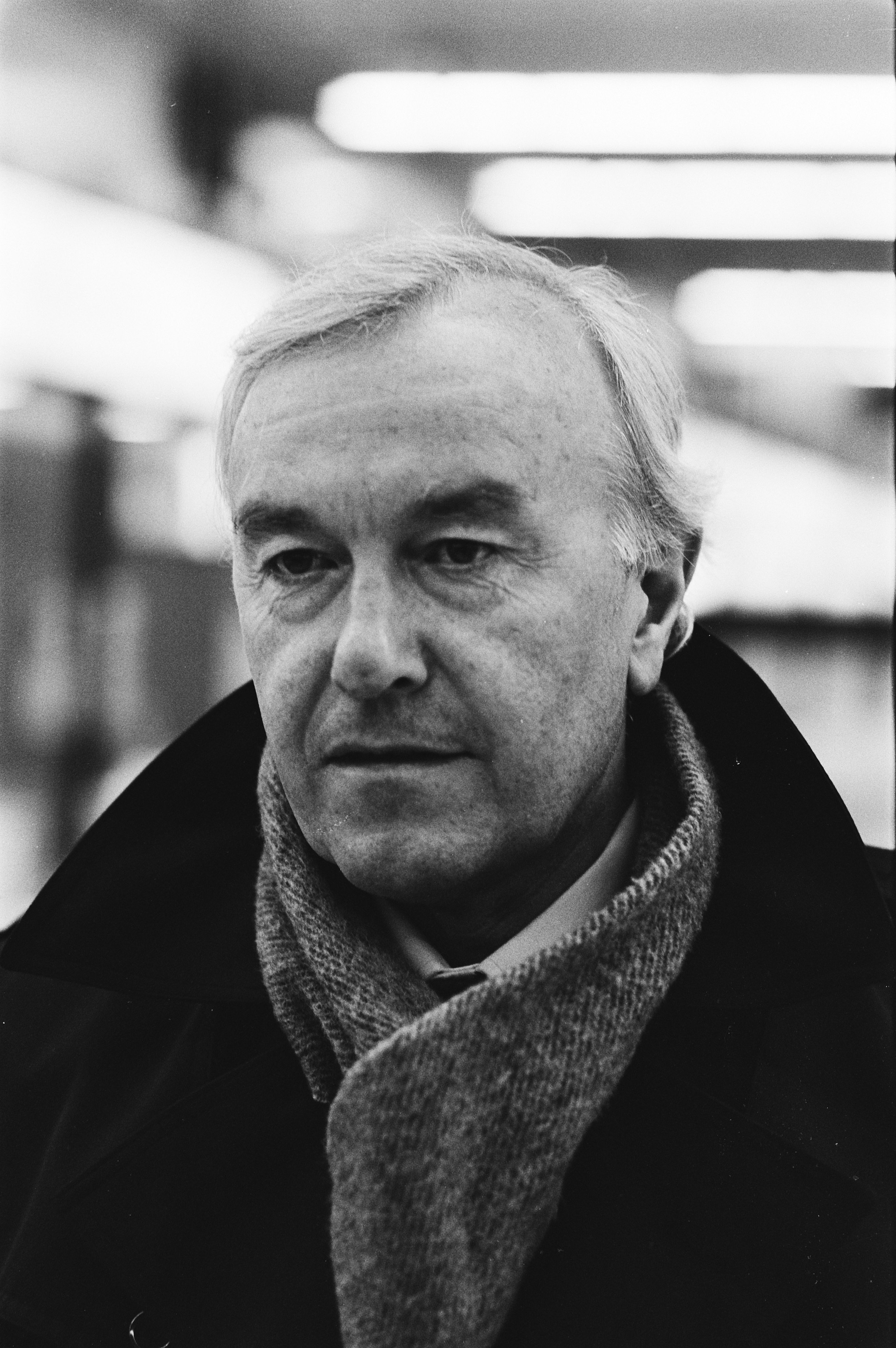

Personal information
- Date of birth: 1 October 1923
- Place of birth: Zvolen, Czechoslovakia
- Date of death: 27 August 1995 (aged 71)
- Place of death: Prague, Czech Republic

Managerial career
- Years: Team
- 1964–1969: Sparta Prague
- 1969–1972: ADO Den Haag
- 1972–1978: Czechoslovakia
- 1978–1982: Feyenoord
- 1982–1984: Sparta Prague
- 1984–1986: FC Zürich
- 1986–1988: Sparta Prague
- 1990–1991: Sparta Prague
- 1993: Representation of Czechs and Slovaks (RCS)
Medal record
Men's football
Representing Czech Republic (as manager)
UEFA European Championship
Winner	1976

Václav Ježek (1 October 1923 – 27 August 1995) was a Czech football manager. Ježek is best known for being the serial manager at Sparta Prague, one of the Czech Republic's most successful clubs, as well as helming the Czechoslovakia national football team to the 1976 UEFA European Football Championship triumph, the country's sole international title.

== Career ==
Chiefly remembered more as a famous coach than as a player, he became coach of Sparta Prague for the first time in the 1960s, going on to transform the team and win two Czechoslovak titles, in 1965 and 1967. After this success, he left Czechoslovakia and moved to the Netherlands. From 1969 to 1972, he coached ADO Den Haag, leading them to third place in the Dutch league, before taking over as head coach of Czechoslovakia's national team. He created a new team of talented players including Ivo Viktor, Alexander Vencel, Antonín Panenka, Ladislav Jurkemik, Zdeněk Nehoda, Anton Ondruš, Jaroslav Pollák and Ján Pivarník. The team won the European Championships in 1976, beating West Germany in a penalty shoot-out in the final, but failed to qualify for the 1978 World Cup Finals. Ježek was replaced as head coach by his assistant Jozef Vengloš.

Ježek moved back to the Netherlands in 1978 as coach of Feyenoord. His best league finish with the Rotterdam club was second in 1979. On leaving Feyenoord in 1982, Ježek was twice coach of Sparta Prague again in the next decade, and started a long period of success for the club, winning the Czechoslovak title several times. In 1993, he became the provisional head coach of the joint Czech-Slovak team, formed after the Czech Republic and Slovakia split in November 1992, in the qualifiers for the 1994 World Cup. During the 1990s he also continued as a member of the managerial stuff of Slavia Prague. He also coached FC Zürich.

Ježek died in Prague in 1995, at the age of 71.

== Honours ==
=== Manager ===
Sparta Prague

- Czechoslovak First League: 1964–65, 1966–67, 1983–84, 1986–87, 1987–88, 1990–91
- Czechoslovak Cup: 1983–84, 1987–88

Feyenoord

- KNVB Cup: 1979–80

Czechoslovakia

- UEFA European Championship: 1976
