= Čapkovič =

Čapkovič (Slovak pronunciation: [ˈtʂapkɔʋitʂ]) is Slovak surname of:

- Ján Čapkovič (born 1948, Bratislava), a Slovak football player
- Jozef Čapkovič (born 1948, Bratislava), a Slovak football player
- Kamil Čapkovič (born 1986, Michalovce), a Slovak tennis player
