= Panenka (penalty kick) =

Type of penalty kick notably used in the 1976 European Championship

An example of a panenka penalty

In association football, the panenka is a technique used while taking a penalty kick in which the taker, instead of kicking the ball to the left or right of the goalkeeper, gives a light touch underneath the ball, causing it to rise and fall within the centre of the goal, deceiving the goalkeeper who will most likely have committed to a dive away from the centre.

The technique was pioneered by Czech player Antonín Panenka when he scored the winning goal in the penalty shootout that decided the UEFA Euro 1976 final in Belgrade, beating West German goalkeeper Sepp Maier to claim the title for the Czechoslovakia national team. The technique garnered Panenka much media attention and praise, but it was likewise deemed risky. Due to it being difficult to execute correctly and relatively easy to save for the goalkeeper if anticipated, a panenka is rarely attempted at professional knock-out tournaments. Sports journalists have noted that generally only highly regarded players who can deal with the consequences of missing such an attempt have tried scoring with a panenka at major tournaments.

Originally, the Czech name for panenka was Vršovický dloubák ('Vršovice chip') — a reference to the Prague district of Vršovice, where Panenka's home club Bohemians is based. This style of penalty kick is also called Il cucchiaio ('the spoon') in Italy, cavadinha ('little dig') in Brazil and penal picado ('poked penalty kick') in Argentina and elsewhere in South America.

== Technique ==
The principle of the panenka: the goalkeeper commits to a dive before the ball is struck, and the ball is chipped gently into the centre of the goal. Below, the flight of the ball compared with an ordinary penalty.

The aim of the technique is not to chip the ball over the goalkeeper, but to take advantage of the fact that many goalkeepers will dive to either side of the goal in anticipation, rather than waiting to see in which direction the ball is going. It is a very risky technique, because the subtle touch on the ball gives it a very slow speed, thus allowing the goalkeeper to move back from where they jumped, or even to simply remain in the same spot and wait for the ball to fall easily into their hands. In addition, the subtle touch is most easily applied by a taker who slows down as they are about to strike the ball, making it possible for the goalkeeper to recognize what the taker is intending. The move is generally only used by confident penalty takers who dare to risk missing the kick. Some players who have attempted a panenka have been criticized by the specialized media or their team's members and supporters, especially if they miss it.

According to studies, a panenka has a lower scoring probability over placement or power, though it is alleged that if successful, a panenka's psychological impact on the opposite team may be profound, which may be why penalty takers elect to use it. In the penalty shootout in Italy's game against England in Euro 2012, Andrea Pirlo opted for a panenka specifically in the hope of inflicting a psychological blow on England. Antonín Panenka, though, saw the penalty as a reflection of his own personality.

== History ==
=== Original 1976 penalty ===
"I saw myself as an entertainer and I saw this penalty as a reflection of my personality. I wanted to give the fans something new to see, to create something that would get them talking."

— Antonín Panenka

Antonín Panenka came to international prominence playing for Czechoslovakia in the 1976 European Championship; Czechoslovakia reached the final, where they faced West Germany. After extra time, the result was 2–2, and so the first penalty shootout in a European Championships final ensued. The first seven kicks were converted, until West Germany's fourth penalty taker, Uli Hoeneß, ballooned his shot over the bar. With the score 4–3, Panenka stepped up to take the fifth Czechoslovak penalty, which would win the match if he scored. He feigned shooting to the side of the goal, causing West German goalkeeper Sepp Maier to dive to his left, and then gently chipped the ball into the middle of the net. The perceived impudence of the shot, in addition to its success, led a watching French journalist to dub Panenka "a poet". The goal was very widely reported on, and Panenka's name became synonymous with the technique. After the game, Panenka was told that he could have been punished if he had missed, as it may have been seen as disrespecting the Communist system in place at the time in his home country. On viewing the penalty, Pelé described Panenka as being "either a genius or a madman".

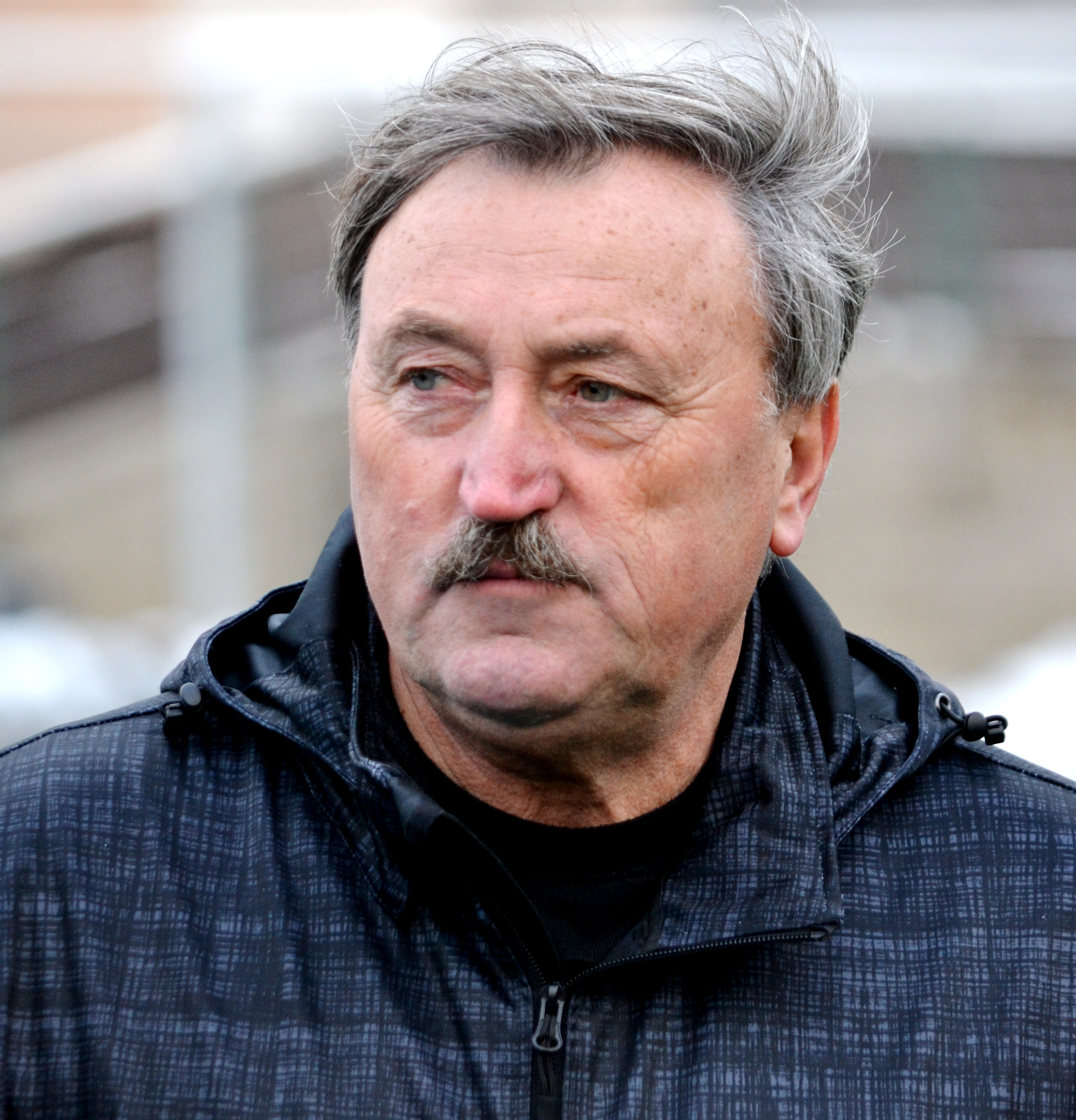
Panenka in 2013.

As well as winning the 1976 European Championship, Panenka helped Czechoslovakia come third in the 1980 tournament, after scoring once again in a 9–8 penalty shootout win. In the finals of the 1982 World Cup, Panenka scored twice from penalties, but these were the only Czechoslovak goals, and the team did not progress beyond the first group stage.

=== Notable subsequent successful examples ===
Panenka's penalty has since been successfully emulated by many other players in a wide range of competitions. Only a small number of these have been, like Panenka's original, in major cup finals:

- Zinedine Zidane in the 2006 FIFA World Cup Final.
- Alexis Sánchez in the 2015 Copa América Final.
- Eden Hazard in the 2019 EFL Cup final.
- Odsonne Édouard in the 2020 Scottish Cup final.
- Fabinho in the 2022 EFL Cup final.

Examples of panenkas outside finals include:

- Marcelo Carrusca for Adelaide United against Wellington Phoenix during the 2013–14 A-League.
- Aaron Ramsey for Wales in their 2018 FIFA World Cup qualification 1–1 draw against Serbia in Belgrade. His goal was in front of the same stand as Panenka's original, in the Red Star Stadium.
- Francesco Totti for Italy in their Euro 2000 semi-final shoot-out against the Netherlands.
- Hélder Postiga for Portugal in their Euro 2004 quarter-finals shoot-out against England.
- Sebastián Abreu for Uruguay in their 2010 FIFA World Cup quarter-final shoot-out against Ghana.
- Andrea Pirlo for Italy in their Euro 2012 quarter-final shoot-out against England.
- Lionel Messi in a UEFA Champions League game for Paris Saint-Germain against RB Leipzig in 2021.
- Karim Benzema for Real Madrid against Manchester City in a UEFA Champions League semi-final in 2022.
- Achraf Hakimi for Morocco in their 2022 FIFA World Cup round of 16 shoot-out against Spain.
- Santiago Rodriguez for New York City FC against FC Cincinnati in the first round of the 2024 MLS Cup playoffs.
- Cole Palmer for Chelsea FC against Tottenham Hotspur FC in the 24/25 Premier League season.
- Mauro Icardi in a UEFA Champions League game for Galatasaray against FC Bayern Munich in 2023.
- Mohamed Salah for Egypt in their 2026 World Cup round of 32 shoot-out against Australia, securing their first knockout win.

Among other players, Sergio Ramos is well known for his penchant on regularly using the panenka, most notably during the Euro 2012 semi-finals against Portugal, and his penalties have been praised by Panenka himself.

=== Notable subsequent unsuccessful examples ===
Attempted panenkas are often unsuccessful. In the Australian 2019 A-League Grand Final Perth Glory player Brendon Santalab, who had scored multiple panenkas previously in his career, played his last game as a professional. The match ended in a penalty shootout between Sydney FC and Santalab's club Perth Glory. With Sydney FC leading 3–1, Santalab took Perth's third penalty, attempting a panenka, but Sydney FC goalkeeper Andrew Redmayne was expecting it. The keeper stood upright and easily saved the weak kick. Sydney FC scored their next penalty, winning the shootout and the A-League Championship 4–1. In 1992, former England captain Gary Lineker failed a panenka which at the time, would have put him level with Bobby Charlton for the England team's top scorer, the missed penalty instead leaving him one goal behind on 48 for the rest of his career.

In a 2013 Copa do Brasil quarter final match on 24 October between Corinthians and Grêmio which went to a penalty shootout, Alexandre Pato attempted a panenka, which was easily caught by Grêmio goalkeeper and former Milan teammate Dida, resulting in Gremio winning the shootout and advancing to the semi-finals.

On 4 July 2024, during the 2024 Copa América quarterfinal match between Argentina and Ecuador, Lionel Messi missed the opening kick of the penalty shootout when he attempted a panenka. The chip fooled the Ecuadorian goalkeeper, but the ball hit the crossbar and bounced up and back, finally landing on the top of the net. Argentina nevertheless won the penalty shootout 4–2. A few days later, during the tournament's third-place match between Canada and Uruguay, Alphonso Davies missed the fourth kick of the penalty shootout when he attempted a panenka. The chip convinced the Uruguayan goalkeeper to dive to his left, but the ball hit the crossbar. With that miss, Uruguay ended up winning the penalty shootout 4–3.

On 18 January 2026 in the AFCON final between Morocco and Senegal, after Senegal left the pitch when a controversial penalty was awarded to Morocco deep in stoppage time, Brahim Díaz attempted a panenka which was easily saved by Édouard Mendy, ultimately costing them the game (though Senegal's win was later overturned and awarded to Morocco by the CAF).
