= Chip (association football) =

Association football shot involving launching the ball via kicking from underneath

A player scoring via chip

A chip, also known as a lob, is a kick in which the ball is kicked from underneath with accuracy but with less than maximum force, to launch it high into the air in order either to pass it over the heads of opponents or to score a goal over the goalkeeper. Chip shots usually have backspin, otherwise they are usually considered a lob.

In general, the lob requires that the player strike the ball with the front of their foot, using the toe to lift the ball up in the air. Mostly used to score, it focuses on getting the ball to a certain amount of vertical height where the goalkeeper cannot reach it and then have it come back down again into the goal. It takes a certain amount of technique and precision to do and players such as Carlos Vela, Raúl González, Cristiano Ronaldo, Radamel Falcao, Ronaldinho, Roberto Baggio, Romário, Francesco Totti, Alessandro Del Piero and Lionel Messi have made it a trademark move.

When a chip shot is used by a player when taking a penalty kick, it is called a panenka, after Czech footballer Antonín Panenka, who famously scored the winning penalty in the shootout of the 1976 UEFA European Championship final in this manner, when he beat West German goalkeeper Sepp Maier to claim the title for the Czechoslovakia national team. The rabona can also be considered a chip if it has the same arc and backspin that the chip does.

In Soviet football and post-Soviet states, the term is known as a parachute goal (Russian: парашутик) or "behind-the-collar" goal (Russian: за воротник). Note that even though the Russian language is widely used in the post-Soviet states, there exist local derivatives of the term.

== See also ==
- Volley
- Shooting
- Panenka (penalty kick)
