= Ognjen Petrović =

Serbian footballer

Personal information
- Full name: Ognjen Petrović
- Date of birth: 2 January 1948
- Place of birth: Beograd, FPR Yugoslavia
- Date of death: 5 August 2000 (aged 52)
- Place of death: Belgrade, FR Yugoslavia
- Position: Goalkeeper

Youth career
- Napredak Kruševac
- –1965: FK 14. Oktobar
- 1965–1967: Red Star Belgrade

Senior career*
Years	Team	Apps	(Gls)
1967–1976	Red Star Belgrade	115	(3)
1976–1978	Bastia	41	(0)
Total		156	(3)

International career
1973–1976	Yugoslavia	15	(0)
Medal record
Men's Football
Representing Yugoslavia
Mediterranean Games
Gold medal – first place	1971 Izmir	Team
- * Club domestic league appearances and goals

Ognjen "Olja" Petrović (Serbian Cyrillic: Огњен Оља Петровић; 2 January 1948 – 21 September 2000) was a Serbian professional goalkeeper who played at Euro 76 for Yugoslavia.

A native of Kruševac, Petrović totalled 259 games for Red Star Belgrade scoring three goals in 115 league games. He also played for French side Bastia alongside Yugoslav star Dragan Džajić and retired at 30 due to injury.

He is the only goalkeeper to score twice in a European match against Real Madrid, when he netted once in normal time and once more in the penalty shoot-out during a 1974–75 European Cup Winners' Cup quarter final match. He also saved a penalty to put Red Star through.
