= Piet Schrijvers =

Dutch footballer and manager (1946–2022)

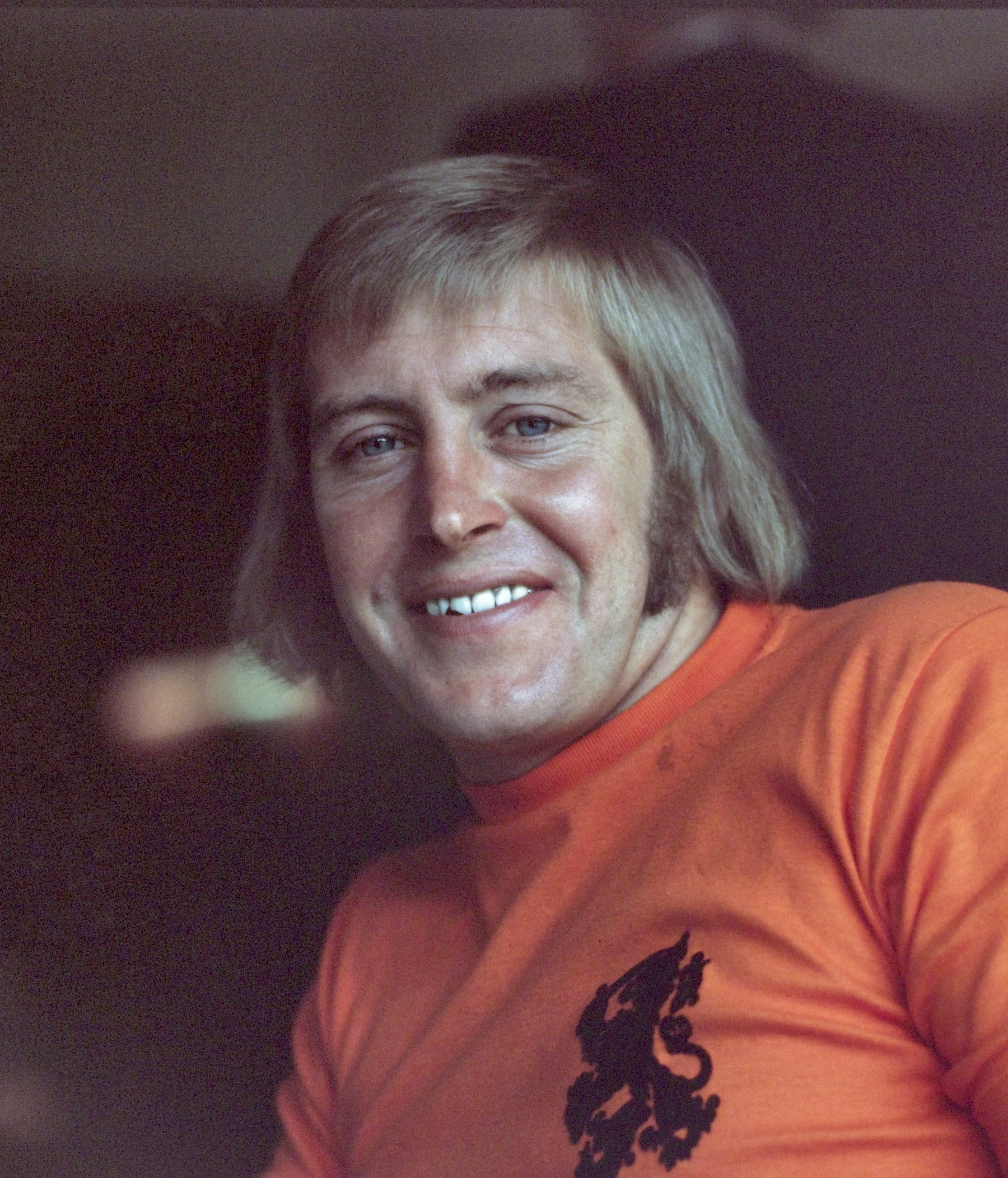
- Schrijvers in 1974

Personal information
- Date of birth: 15 December 1946
- Place of birth: Jutphaas, Netherlands
- Date of death: 7 September 2022 (aged 75)
- Position: Goalkeeper

Senior career*
Years	Team	Apps	(Gls)
1963–1965	HVC	0	(0)
1965–1968	DWS	40	(0)
1968–1974	FC Twente	190	(0)
1974–1983	Ajax	269	(1)
1983–1985	Zwolle	62	(0)
Total		563	(1)

International career
1971–1984	Netherlands	46	(0)

Managerial career
- 1987–1989: FC Wageningen
- 1991–1993: TOP Oss
- 1993–1994: AZ
- 1995–1996: FC Zwolle
Medal record
Men's football
Representing Netherlands
FIFA World Cup
Runner-up	1974
Runner-up	1978
European Championship
Third place	1976
- * Club domestic league appearances and goals

Pieter "Piet" Schrijvers (15 December 1946 – 7 September 2022) was a Dutch professional football manager and player who played as a goalkeeper.

At club level, he spent nine years with AFC Ajax, winning five Eredivisie titles and two KNVB Cups.

At international level, he was a member of the Netherlands squads which finished runner up in both the 1974 and 1978 FIFA World Cups. In addition, he was selected in the Dutch squads for UEFA Euro 1976 and 1980.

== Death ==
Schrijvers died in September 2022 from complications of Alzheimer's disease.

== Nicknames ==
Schrijvers earned his first nickname at Ajax, as De Beer van De Meer (meaning The Bear of De Meer, the stadium where Ajax used to play its home games). Later, he earned several other (rhyming) nicknames, such as De Bolle van Zwolle (The Fatty from Zwolle). Most names alluded to his stature as he used to be heavy. Schrijvers himself said in interviews he was only proud of his nickname at Ajax.

== Career statistics ==
=== International ===
Appearances and goals by national team and year
National team	Year	Apps	Goals
Netherlands	1971	1	0
Netherlands	1972	0	0
Netherlands	1973	3	0
Netherlands	1974	1	0
Netherlands	1975	4	0
Netherlands	1976	4	0
Netherlands	1977	2	0
Netherlands	1978	8	0
Netherlands	1979	7	0
Netherlands	1980	5	0
Netherlands	1981	3	0
Netherlands	1982	1	0
Netherlands	1983	6	0
Netherlands	1984	1	0
Total		46	0

== Honours ==
Ajax

- Eredivisie: 1976–77, 1978–79, 1979–80, 1981–82, 1982–83
- KNVB Cup: winner 1978–79, 1982–83; runner-up 1977–78, 1979–80, 1980–81

Netherlands

- FIFA World Cup: runner-up 1974, 1978
- UEFA European Football Championship: third place 1976

Individual

- Tonny van Leeuwen Award (best goalkeeper of the season): 1971-72
- Dutch Golden Boot winner: 1983
