= Alfred Delcourt =

Belgian football referee

- Delcourt in 1977
- Born: 17 January 1929; Sleidinge, Belgium
- Died: 12 December 2012 (aged 83)

Domestic
Years	League	Role
1965–1978	Belgian First Division A	Referee

International
Years	League	Role
1967–1978	FIFA listed	Referee

Alfred Delcourt (17 January 1929 – 12 December 2012) was a Belgian football referee.

== Refereeing career ==
In 1965, Delcourt was promoted to officiate in the Belgian First Division A, the top flight of Belgian football. Two years later, he was appointed as a FIFA referee.

In 1976, Delcourt was appointed as a referee for UEFA Euro 1976, where he officiated a semi-final match between Yugoslavia and West Germany.

Delcourt retired from refereeing in 1978.
