= Koloman Gögh =

Czechoslovak footballer (1948–1995)

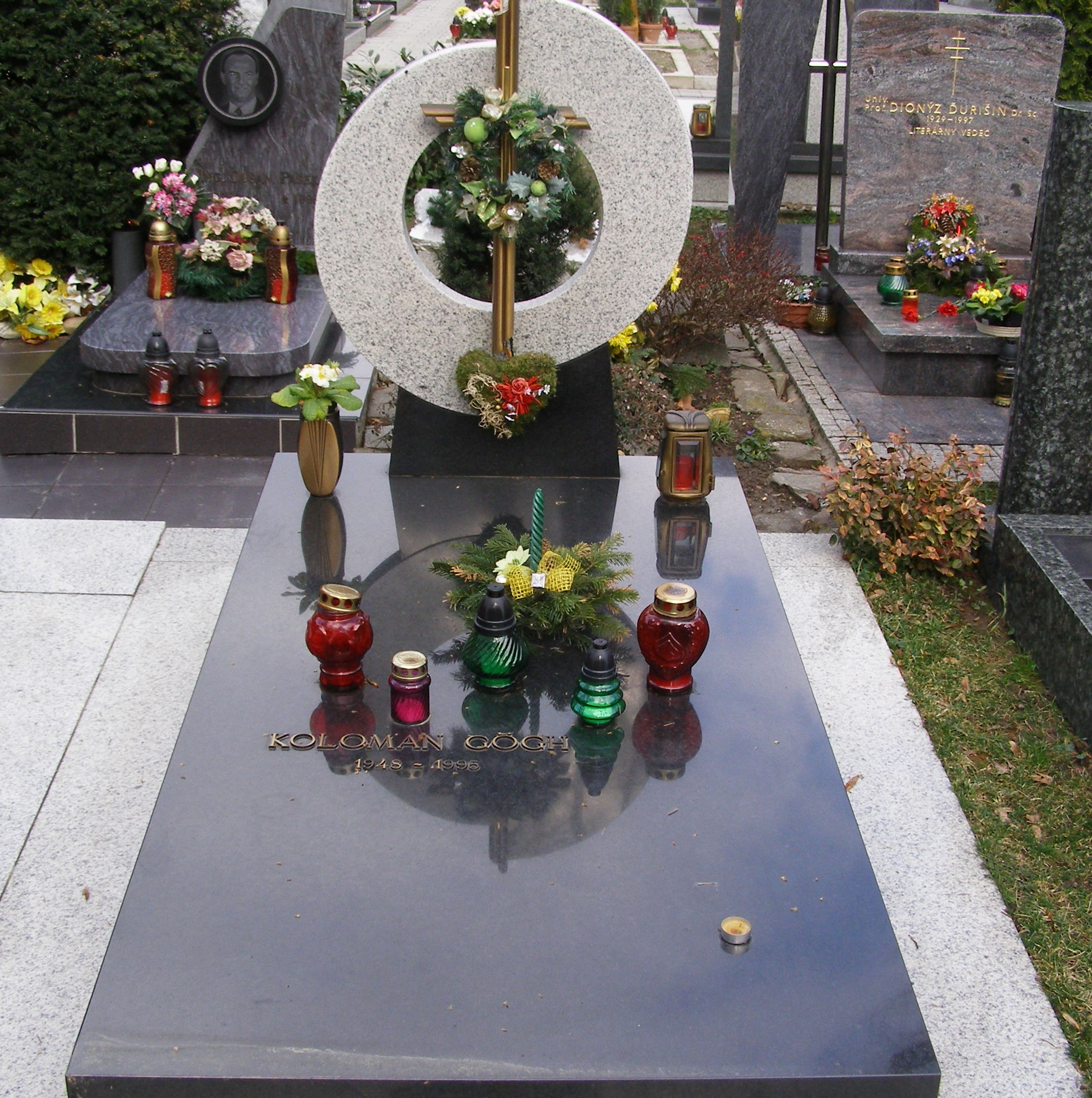
- Gögh's grave

Personal information
- Date of birth: 7 January 1948
- Place of birth: Kladno, Czechoslovakia
- Date of death: 11 November 1995 (aged 47)
- Place of death: Gattendorf, Austria
- Position: Defender

Youth career
- 1956–1963: Družstevník Kolárovo
- 1963–1967: Spartak Komárno

Senior career*
Years	Team	Apps	(Gls)
1967–1969	Dukla Holešov		
1969–1970	Vagónka Poprad		
1970–1980	Slovan Bratislava	225	(3)
1980–1982	VÖEST Linz	59	(0)
1982–1984	DAC Dunajská Streda		

International career
1974–1980	Czechoslovakia	55	(1)

Managerial career
- 1982–1984: DAC Dunajská Streda (player-coach)
- 1984–1986: Slovan Bratislava (assistant)
- 1986–1995: SV Gols (player-coach)
Medal record
Representing Czechoslovakia
UEFA European Championship
Winner	1976 Yugoslavia
- * Club domestic league appearances and goals

Koloman Gögh (Hungarian: Gőgh Kálmán; 7 January 1948 – 11 November 1995) was a Czechoslovak footballer who played as a defender.

== Biography ==
Gögh was born in Kladno in what is today the Czech Republic but began playing football in Kolárovo, a town with over 80% Hungarian minority.

After that, he played for the junior team of Komárno and fulfilled his national service duties in Dukla Holešov serving as a paratrooper.

After military service, Gögh resumed his football career at Slovan Bratislava. He played for Czechoslovakia national team in 1975 and 1976 when they won the 1976 European Football Championship; in that period he played in 55 matches and scored one goal. Gögh was a participant in the 1980 UEFA European Championship.

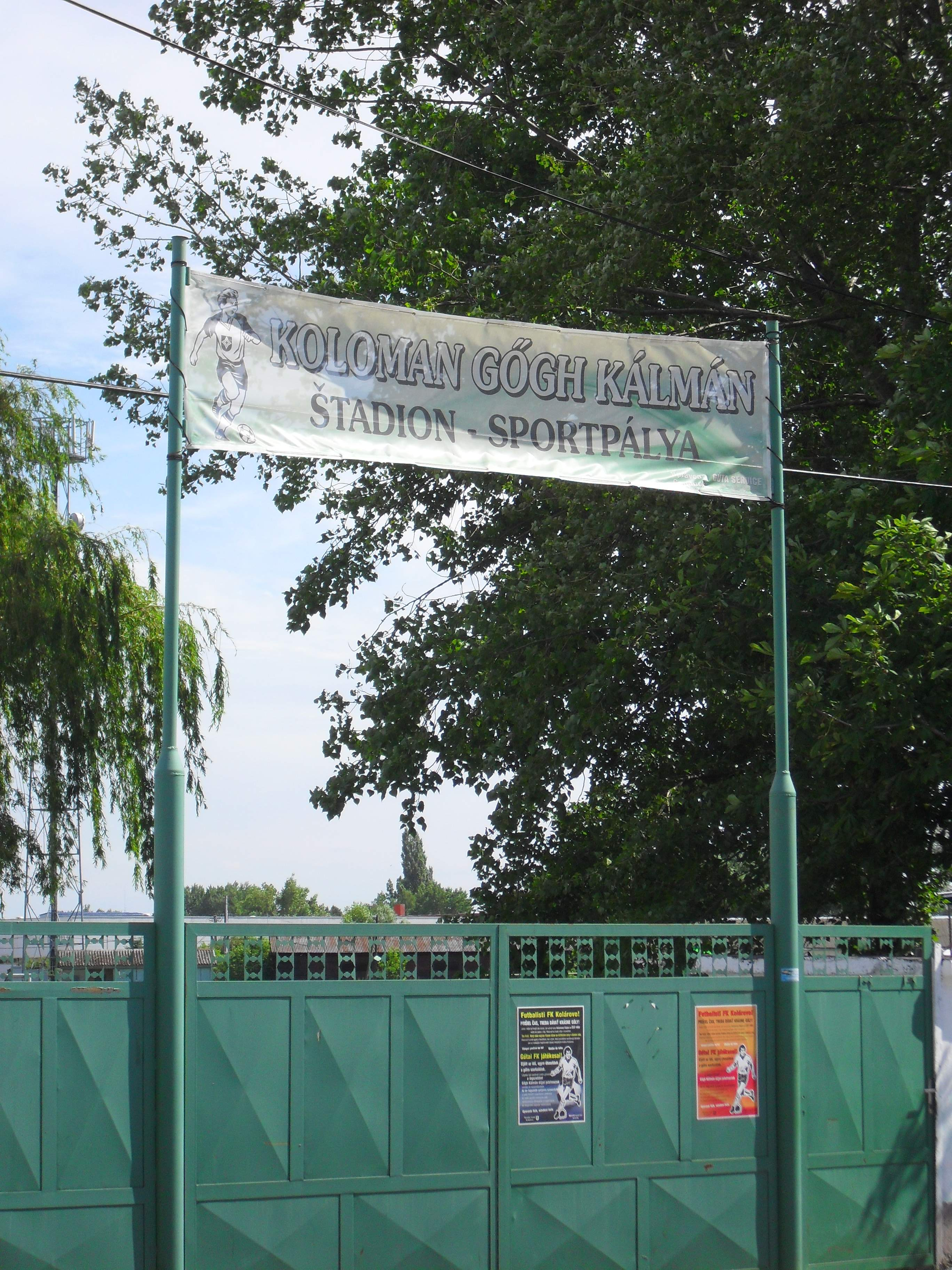
Kálmán Gőgh Stadium in Kolárovo (Gúta)

Later he worked as coach, returning from a game Gögh died in a car accident. FK Kolárovo named stadium in his honour Štadión Kolomana Gögha (Gőgh Kálmán Sportpálya).
