= Jozef Čapkovič =

Slovak footballer

Personal information
- Date of birth: 11 January 1948 (age 78)
- Place of birth: Bratislava, Czechoslovakia
- Height: 1.81 m (5 ft 11 1/2 in)
- Position: Midfielder

Senior career*
Years	Team	Apps	(Gls)
1967–1977	Slovan Bratislava		
1977	Dukla Prague		
1978–1979	Slovan Bratislava		

International career
1974–1977	Czechoslovakia	16	(0)
Medal record
Representing Czechoslovakia
UEFA European Championship
Winner	1976 Yugoslavia
- * Club domestic league appearances and goals

Jozef Čapkovič (born 11 January 1948 in Bratislava, Czechoslovakia) is a former Slovak football player. He played for Czechoslovakia, making 16 appearances for the national side.

He was a participant at the 1976 UEFA European Championship, where Czechoslovakia won the gold medal.

He played mostly for Slovan Bratislava, although he played part of the 1977–78 Czechoslovak First League for Dukla Prague. His twin brother Ján was also a successful footballer.

From 1992 to 1994 he was a Member of the National Council for the Slovak National Party. He unsuccessfully ran for a parliament seat again in 2010.
