= Danilo Popivoda =

Slovenian footballer (1947–2021)

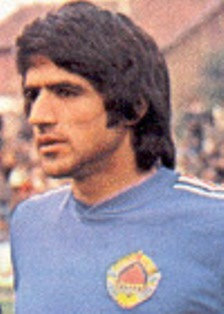
- Popivoda in the 1970s

Personal information
- Full name: Danilo Popivoda
- Date of birth: 1 May 1947
- Place of birth: Lovćenac, PR Serbia, Yugoslavia
- Date of death: 9 September 2021 (aged 74)
- Place of death: Bijela, Montenegro
- Height: 1.71 m (5 ft 7 in)
- Positions: Forward; right winger

Youth career
- 1964–1965: Olimpija Ljubljana

Senior career*
Years	Team	Apps	(Gls)
1965–1975	Olimpija Ljubljana	226	(58)
1975–1981	Eintracht Braunschweig	129	(30)
1981–1982	Olimpija Ljubljana	1	(0)
Total		356	(88)

International career
1972–1977	Yugoslavia	20	(5)

Managerial career
- 1998–2002: Slovenia (assistant)
- * Club domestic league appearances and goals

Danilo Popivoda (Serbian Cyrillic: Данило Попивода; 1 May 1947 – 9 September 2021) was a football player and manager.

On the international level he played for the Yugoslavia national team (20 matches and five goals) and was a participant at the 1974 FIFA World Cup. He also participated at the UEFA Euro 1976, where he scored a goal in a match against West Germany. His final international was a November 1977 World Cup qualification match against Spain.

During the 1945–1990 period, Popivoda was among a handful of Slovenian players, along with Branko Oblak and Srečko Katanec, who managed to get into the Yugoslavia national team.
