= Jaroslav Pollák =

Slovak footballer (1947–2020)

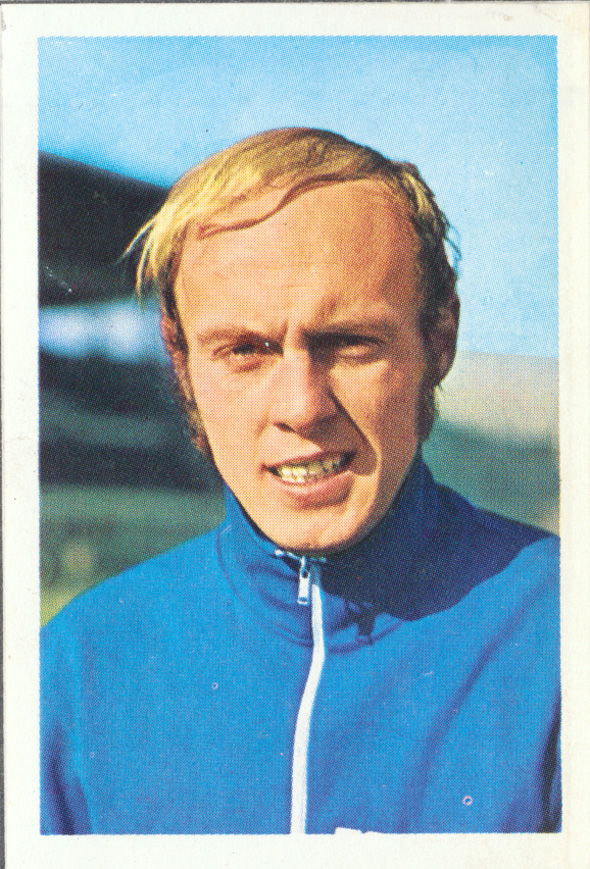
- Pollák at the 1970 FIFA World Cup

Personal information
- Date of birth: 11 July 1947
- Place of birth: Nižný Medzev, Czechoslovakia
- Date of death: 26 June 2020 (aged 72)
- Place of death: Košice, Slovakia
- Height: 1.76 m (5 ft 9 in)
- Position: Midfielder

Senior career*
Years	Team	Apps	(Gls)
1965–1977	VSS Košice		
1977–1979	Dukla Banská Bystrica		
1979–1980	Sparta Prague	40	(1)
1981–1983	Austria Salzburg	65	(1)
1983–1988	ZŤS Košice		
Total		105	(2)

International career
1968–1980	Czechoslovakia	49	(1)
Medal record
Representing Czechoslovakia
UEFA European Championship
Winner	1976 Yugoslavia
- * Club domestic league appearances and goals

Jaroslav Pollák (11 July 1947 – 26 June 2020) was a Slovak footballer who played as a midfielder. He played for Czechoslovakia national team in 49 matches and scored one goal.

He was a participant at the 1970 FIFA World Cup, where he played in a match against England, at Euro 1976, where his team won the gold medal, and also at Euro 1980.

Pollák played for more than 10 years for FC VSS Košice.

== Death ==
Pollák died on 26 June 2020 at the age of 72.

== Honours ==
Czechoslovakia

- UEFA European Championship: 1976

Individual

- UEFA European Championship Team of the Tournament: 1976
