= Ján Pivarník =

Slovak footballer and manager

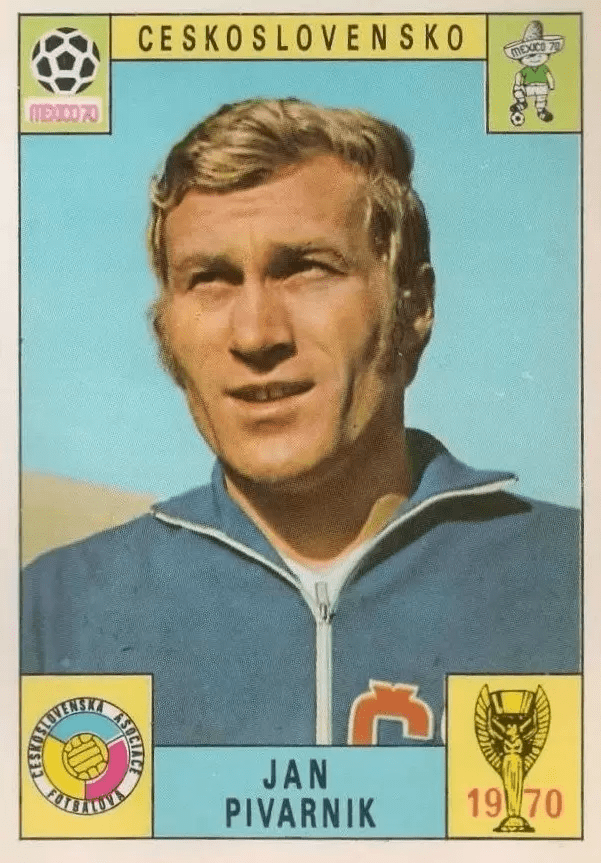
- Pivarník at the 1970 FIFA World Cup

Personal information
- Date of birth: 13 November 1947 (age 78)
- Place of birth: Cejkov, Czechoslovakia
- Position: Right back

Senior career*
Years	Team	Apps	(Gls)
1965–1966	Slavoj Trebišov		
1966–1972	VSS Košice		
1972–1978	Slovan Bratislava		
1978–1979	Dukla Banská Bystrica		
1979–1980	ASV Kittsee		
1980–1981	SC Neusiedl am See		
1981	Cádiz	3	(0)

International career
1968–1977	Czechoslovakia	39	(1)

Managerial career
- 1982–1983: FK Austria Wien (assistant)
- 1983–1984: Sporting CP (assistant)
- 1985–1989: Al-Fahaheel
- 1992–1993: Hapoel Petah Tikva
- 1993–1995: Al Qadsiah
- 1995–1996: Oman U19
- 1997–1998: Al-Salmiya
- 1998–1999: Al-Arabi (Kuwait)
- 1999–2000: Al Jazira
- 2000–2001: Al-Arabi (Kuwait)
- 2002–2003: Kuwait SC
- 2003–2005: Al Qadsiah
- 2005–2007: Al-Fahaheel
Medal record
Representing Czechoslovakia
UEFA European Championship
Winner	1976 Yugoslavia
- * Club domestic league appearances and goals

JUDr. Ján Pivarník (born 13 November 1947) is a former Slovak football player and later a football manager. He played for Czechoslovakia, for which he played 39 matches.

He won the 1976 UEFA European Championship against Franz Beckenbauer's West Germany.

He was member of the ALL STAR TEAM of 1976 UEFA European Championship and named as the best right defender in Europe.

At his time, he was the quickest football player in the World, making 100m in 10.9 sec.

He played mostly for Slovan Bratislava and later worked successfully as a coach for 25 years in Portugal, Austria, Saudi Arabia, Kuwait, Qatar, UAE and Oman.

== Honours ==
=== Player ===
Slovan Bratislava

- Slovak Cup (2): 1973–74, 1975–76
- Czechoslovak First League (2): 1973–74, 1974–75
- Czechoslovak Cup (1): 1973–74

Czechoslovakia

- UEFA Euro 1976: Winner

=== Manager ===
- Asian Cup Winners Cup (1):
  - 1993 – 1994 – Al Qadisiyah Saudi
- Kuwait Emir Cup (2):
  - 1986 – 1999
- Kuwaiti Premier League (1):
  - 1997–98
- Kuwait Crown Prince Cup (1):
  - 1999
- Al-Khurafi Cup (1):
  - 1999
- Saudi Federation Cup (1):
  - 1993–94
