= František Veselý =

Czech footballer

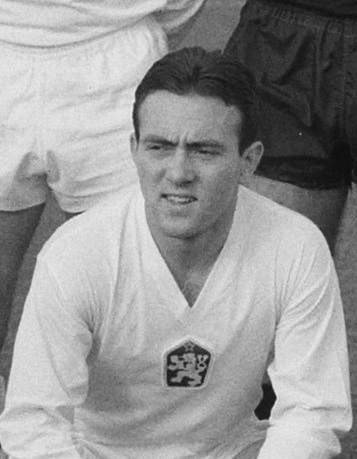
- František Veselý in 1966

Personal information
- Date of birth: 7 December 1943
- Place of birth: Prague, Bohemia and Moravia
- Date of death: 30 October 2009 (aged 65)
- Place of death: Prague, Czech Republic
- Position: Right winger

Youth career
- 1953–1962: Slavia Prague

Senior career*
Years	Team	Apps	(Gls)
1962–1964	Dukla Prague	10	(1)
1964–1980	Slavia Prague	404	(61)
1980–1981	Rapid Wien	20	(1)
1981–1983	SC Zwettl		
1983–1984	First Vienna	10	(0)
Total		444	(63)

International career
1965–1977	Czechoslovakia	34	(3)
Medal record
Representing Czechoslovakia
UEFA European Championship
Winner	1976 Yugoslavia
- * Club domestic league appearances and goals

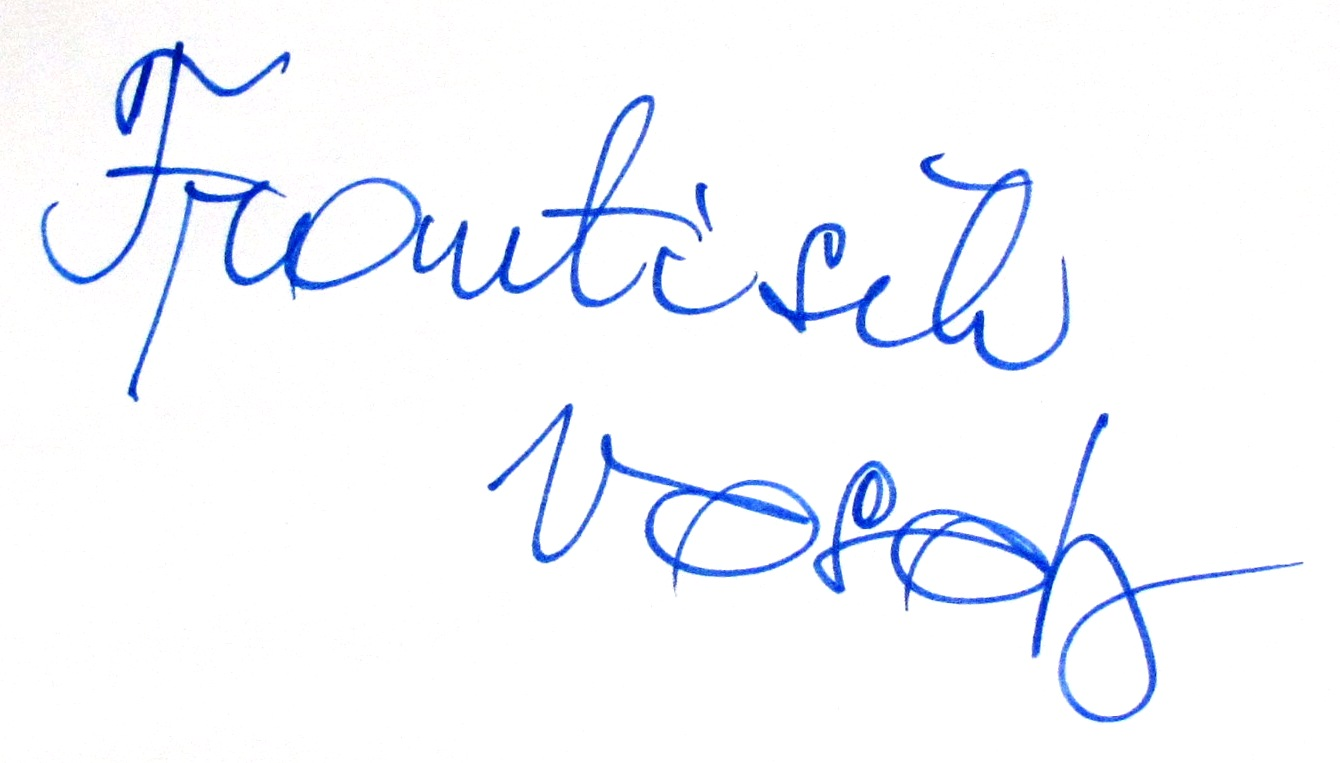
Signature of Frantisek Vesely (2004)

František Veselý (7 December 1943, in Prague – 30 October 2009) was a Czech football player. He played on the right wing and was known for his technique. He spent his best football years playing for SK Slavia Prague.

He played for Czechoslovakia, for whom he appeared in 34 matches and scored three goals. He was a participant in the 1970 FIFA World Cup and in the 1976 UEFA European Championship, where Czechoslovakia won the gold medal. In extra time of the semi-final of EURO 1976 against the Netherlands, he provided a pass to Zdeněk Nehoda, who scored to give Czechoslovakia a 2–1 lead. He then scored himself as the game finished 3–1 and the team reached the final.

Veselý died of heart failure on 30 October 2009 at the age of 65.
