= Dieter Müller =

German footballer

Personal information
- Birth name: Dieter Kaster
- Date of birth: 1 April 1954 (age 72)
- Place of birth: Offenbach, West Germany
- Height: 1.82 m (6 ft 0 in)
- Position: Striker

Youth career
- 1964–1969: SG Götzenhain
- 1969–1972: Kickers Offenbach

Senior career*
Years	Team	Apps	(Gls)
1972–1973	Kickers Offenbach	2	(0)
1973–1981	1. FC Köln	248	(159)
1981–1982	VfB Stuttgart	30	(14)
1982–1985	Bordeaux	93	(43)
1985	Grasshoppers	7	(3)
1985–1986	1. FC Saarbrücken	23	(4)
1986–1989	Kickers Offenbach	51	(26)
Total		454	(249)

International career
1973–1974	West Germany Amateur	6	(2)
1975–1981	West Germany B	6	(6)
1976–1978	West Germany	12	(9)

Managerial career
- 2000: Kickers Offenbach (joint with Oliver Roth)
Medal record
Representing West Germany
UEFA European Championship
Runner-up	1976 Yugoslavia
- * Club domestic league appearances and goals

Dieter Müller (né Kaster; 1 April 1954) is a German former professional footballer who played as a forward. He achieved his greatest success playing for 1. FC Köln in the Bundesliga in the late 1970s, becoming the topscorer of the Bundesliga for two consecutive seasons and winning the domestic double in the 1978 season. Müller scored 177 goals in 303 games in the German league, including six goals in one game in August 1977, a record that still stands. With his 231 goals in 326 games in all tournaments for 1. FC Köln, he remains the club's all time topscorer. He also represented West Germany at two major tournaments, becoming the UEFA Euro 1976 tournament top scorer and being the only player to score a hattrick in the knockout stage after coming on from the bench. He also scored two goals at the 1978 FIFA World Cup.

== Career ==
Müller played and scored in the UEFA Euro 1976 final, which West Germany lost on penalties to Czechoslovakia. He was again in the national team in the 1978 FIFA World Cup, though the campaign ended in disappointment when West Germany, the defending champions, did not qualify for the tournament's final. In his spell with 1. FC Köln he set a record for the most goals scored by a player in a single Bundesliga match. On 17 August 1977, he tallied six goals (scoring in the 12th, 23rd, 32nd, 52nd, 73rd and in the 85th minute) in Köln's 7–2 victory over Werder Bremen in front of a crowd of 19,000 at Köln's Müngersdorfer Stadion. However, since television cameramen were on strike on that day, there are no known film of Müller's goals. He was crowned Bundesliga topscorer that season (24 goals in 33 games), as he had the season before (34 goals in 34 appearances).

After he left Köln, he played for several seasons in France and Switzerland, before returning to West Germany.

Müller is the son of Heinz Kaster, who played as a defender for FC St. Pauli and Kickers Offenbach in the early 1950s. The striker had already been a schoolboy international, when his stepfather's adoption turned his surname into Müller.

== Personal life ==
Müller's son Alexander, aged 16, died of a brain tumor in 1997.

Müller suffered a severe heart attack on 5 October 2012 and fell into a five-day coma.

== Career statistics ==
=== Club ===
Appearances and goals by club, season and competition
Club	Season	League	League		Cup		Europe		Total	
Club	Season	League	Apps	Goals	Apps	Goals	Apps	Goals	Apps	Goals
Kickers Offenbach	1972–73	Bundesliga	2	0						
1. FC Köln	1973–74	Bundesliga	31	17	3	1	7	4	41	22
1. FC Köln	1974–75	Bundesliga	34	24	4	4	9	8	47	36
1. FC Köln	1975–76	Bundesliga	19	14	4	3	-	-	23	17
1. FC Köln	1976–77	Bundesliga	34	34	8	14	6	5	48	53
1. FC Köln	1977–78	Bundesliga	33	24	7	8	2	1	42	33
1. FC Köln	1978–79	Bundesliga	29	8	2	2	6	5	37	15
1. FC Köln	1979–80	Bundesliga	34	21	8	7	-	-	42	28
1. FC Köln	1980–81	Bundesliga	34	17	3	2	9	8	46	27
1. FC Köln	Total		248	159	39	41	39	31	326	231
VfB Stuttgart	1981–82	Bundesliga	30	14	3	5	2	1	35	20
Bordeaux	1982–83	Division 1	29	17	5	1	2	3	36	21
Bordeaux	1983–84	Division 1	28	14	5	5	0	0	33	19
Bordeaux	1984–85	Division 1	36	12	2	4	8	3	46	19
Bordeaux	Total		93	43	12	10	10	6	116	59
Grasshoppers	1985–86	Super League	7	3	-	-	—		7	3
1. FC Saarbrücken	1985–86	Bundesliga	23	4	1	0	—		24	4
Kickers Offenbach	1986–87		6	3	-	-	—		6	3
Kickers Offenbach	1987–88	2. Bundesliga	24	16	-	-	—		24	16
Kickers Offenbach	1988–89	2. Bundesliga	27	10	1	2	—		28	12
Kickers Offenbach	1989–90		0	0	-	-	—		0	0
Kickers Offenbach	Total		60	31	1	2	—		63	33
Career total			463	254	54	53	49	37	566	348

== Honours ==
1. FC Köln

- Bundesliga: 1977–78
- DFB Pokal: 1976–77, 1977–78

Bordeaux

- French Division 1: 1983–84, 1984–85

Individual

- Sport Ideal European XI: 1976
- Bundesliga top scorer: 1976–77, 1977–78
- DFB-Pokal top scorer: 1976–77, 1977–78
- UEFA European Championship top scorer: 1976
- UEFA European Championship Team of the Tournament: 1976
