= Ján Švehlík =

Slovak footballer and manager

Personal information
- Date of birth: 17 January 1950 (age 76)
- Place of birth: Lovča, Czechoslovakia
- Position: Striker

Senior career*
| Years | Team | Apps | (Gls) |
| 1969–1976 | Slovan Bratislava | | |
| 1976–1977 | Dukla Prague | | |
| 1977–1982 | Slovan Bratislava | | |
| 1982–1983 | KSC Hasselt | | |

International career
| 1974–1979 | Czechoslovakia | 17 | (4) |

Managerial career
- 1997: Slovan Bratislava
- 1998: Slovan Bratislava
- 2002: Slovan Bratislava
Medal record
Representing Czechoslovakia
UEFA European Championship
| Winner | 1976 Yugoslavia |
- * Club domestic league appearances and goals

Ján Švehlík (born 17 January 1950) is a former Slovak football player and later a football manager. He played for Czechoslovakia, for which he played 17 matches and scored 4 goals.

He played mostly for ŠK Slovan Bratislava.

== International career ==
Švehlík made 17 appearances for the full Czechoslovakia national football team. He was a participant at the 1976 UEFA European Championship, which Czechoslovakia won. He scored an important first goal in the final against West Germany.
