= Karol Dobiaš =

Slovak footballer and coach

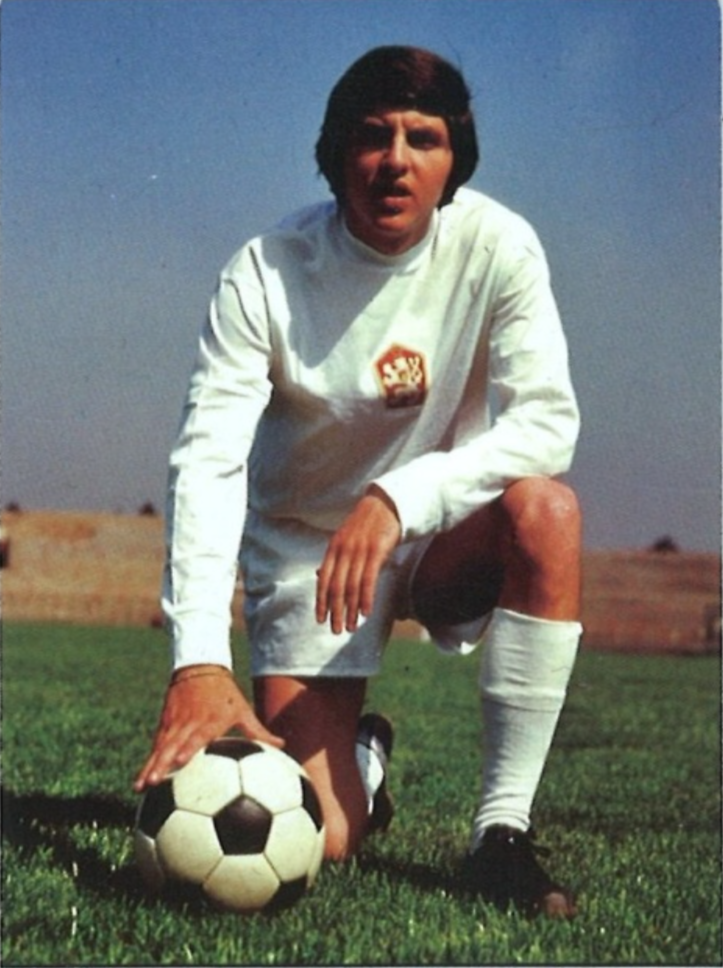
- Dobiaš in 1970

Personal information
- Full name: Karol Dobiaš
- Date of birth: 18 December 1947 (age 78)
- Place of birth: Handlová, Czechoslovakia
- Positions: Right back; midfielder

Youth career
- Baník Handlová

Senior career*
Years	Team	Apps	(Gls)
1965–1977	Spartak Trnava	277	(11)
1977–1980	Bohemians Prague	67	(9)
1980–1983	Lokeren	68	(0)
1984	Racing Gand		
Total		412	(20)

International career
1967–1980	Czechoslovakia	67	(6)

Managerial career
- 1984–1988: Bohemians Prague (youth)
- 1988: SK Hradec Králové
- 1990–1993: Zbrojovka Brno
- 1993–1994: Sparta Prague
- 1995: SK Sparta Krč
- 2003–2004: Bohemians Prague (assistant)
Medal record
Representing Czechoslovakia
UEFA European Championship
Winner	1976 Yugoslavia
- * Club domestic league appearances and goals

Karol Dobiaš (born 18 December 1947) is a former Slovak football player and coach. During his career, he was a versatile player, mostly playing as either a defender or midfielder.

== Playing career ==
He was born in Handlová. His career started in Baník Handlová. In 1965 he moved to Spartak Trnava where he achieved the biggest success as a player. With Spartak he became a five time Czechoslovak champion and won three national cups. In 1970 and 1971, he was named Czechoslovak Footballer of the Year. In 1977, he moved to Bohemians Prague. During his career he played 345 matches in the Czechoslovak league and scored 20 goals. In 1980, he was allowed to be transferred abroad and he went to KSC Lokeren in Belgium. He ended his career in 1984 at Racing Gand.

He was capped 67 times for Czechoslovakia, scored 6 goals. He was a participant at the 1970 FIFA World Cup and a member of Czechoslovak winning team at 1976 European Football Championship. In the 1976 final game Dobiaš scored a goal that gave Czechoslovakia a 2–0 lead against West Germany.

== Coaching career ==
Dobias' first team as a manager was the youth squad of Bohemians Prague. In 1988/89 he managed SK Hradec Králové but was dismissed after the 14th game day. In September 1990 he was assigned manager of Zbrojovka Brno. The team was relegated and with Dobiaš it achieved a one-season comeback. In 1993/1994 he managed Sparta Prague and won the Czech league. Still he was fired after just two games the following season. In 1995/1996 he coached a minor Prague team SK Sparta Krč. Afterwards he worked for many years as a scout for Sparta Prague. For the 2003/2004 he was selected an assistant manager for Bohemians Prague but his contract was cancelled in January 2004.
