= Anton Ondruš =

Slovak footballer

Personal information
- Date of birth: 27 March 1950 (age 76)
- Place of birth: Solčany, Czechoslovakia
- Position: Sweeper

Youth career
- 1959–1970: Slovan Bratislava

Senior career*
Years	Team	Apps	(Gls)
1970–1977	Slovan Bratislava	210	(38)
1977–1978	Dukla Banská Bystrica		
1978–1980	Slovan Bratislava		
1981–1982	Club Brugge	7	(0)
1983–1987	CS Thonon	116	(6)
1988–1989	FC Biel		
Total		333	(44)

International career
1974–1980	Czechoslovakia	58	(9)
Medal record
Representing Czechoslovakia
UEFA European Championship
Winner	1976 Yugoslavia
- * Club domestic league appearances and goals

Anton Ondruš (born 27 March 1950) is a Slovak footballer who played as a defender.

== Early club career ==
Ondruš was born in Solčany, Czechoslovakia. He started to play regularly for Slovan Bratislava in the fall of 1970. With this club, he won the Czechoslovak League in 1974 and 1975, and he later become the captain of this team, playing in total in 210 matches and scoring 38 goals. The team won the Czechoslovak Cup in 1974.

== International career ==
Ondruš played 58 matches for Czechoslovakia and scored 9 goals. As a captain, he led the national team in the 1976 UEFA European Championship. His superb performance against Cruyff's Netherlands in semi-finals where he scored twice (one own goal) opened his team the door to the final match where Czechoslovakia won the gold medal in the famous Belgrade Night game against the then world champion West Germany. At the 1980 UEFA European Championship, he contributed to the national team's bronze medal.

== Later career ==
1981 Ondruš changed to Club Brugge K.V. to Belgium, but he played only nine games. From 1983 till 1987 he played in the French club CS Thonon and towards the end of his career at FC Biel-Bienne, Switzerland.

1997 he was a president of Slovan Bratislava for a short period. Currently he works in Switzerland.

== Honours ==
Czechoslovakia

- UEFA European Championship: 1976

Individual

- UEFA European Championship Team of the Tournament: 1976
- Sport Ideal European XI: 1976

Preceded by Franz Beckenbauer; West Germany	UEFA European Championship; Winning Captain; 1976	Succeeded by Bernard Dietz; West Germany
