= Hannes Bongartz =

German footballer (born 1951)

Personal information
- Full name: Hans Bongartz
- Date of birth: 3 October 1951 (age 75)
- Place of birth: Bonn, West Germany
- Position: Midfielder

Senior career*
Years	Team	Apps	(Gls)
1969–1971	Bonner SC	23	(3)
1971–1974	SG Wattenscheid 09	99	(37)
1974–1978	Schalke 04	131	(24)
1978–1984	1. FC Kaiserslautern	167	(15)
Total		420	(79)

International career
1974–1978	West Germany B	9	(0)
1976–1977	West Germany	4	(0)

Managerial career
- 1985–1987: 1. FC Kaiserslautern
- 1988–1990: FC Zürich
- 1990–1994: SG Wattenscheid 09
- 1994–1996: MSV Duisburg
- 1996–1997: Borussia Mönchengladbach
- 1998–2004: SG Wattenscheid 09
- 2006: Sportfreunde Siegen
- 2006–2008: Skoda Xanthi (athletic director)
- * Club domestic league appearances and goals

Hans "Hannes" Bongartz (born 3 October 1951) is a German football coach and former player.

== Club career ==
Bongartz was born in Bonn. He began his footballing career at SG Wattenscheid 09 and became a central midfielder to be reckoned with even before moving to FC Schalke 04 in 1974. He moved to 1. FC Kaiserslautern in 1978 where he was to finish his career in 1984. Altogether Bongartz played 298 Bundesliga games, scoring 39 goals.

== International career ==
Bongartz participated in the Euro 1976 in Yugoslavia. Bongartz won four caps for the West Germany national team.

== Coaching career ==
Bongartz later became the coach of Borussia Mönchengladbach and 1. FC Kaiserslautern. During the 2003–04 season Bongartz became the trainer of SG Wattenscheid 09. His best Bundesliga result as a manager is seventh place in 1987 with Kaiserslautern.

== Honours ==
West Germany

- UEFA European Championship runner-up: 1976

Schalke 04

- Bundesliga runner-up: 1976–77

1. FC Kaiserslautern

- DFB-Pokal finalist: 1980–81
