= Ladislav Jurkemik =

Slovak footballer and manager

Personal information
- Date of birth: 20 July 1953 (age 73)
- Place of birth: Jacovce, Czechoslovakia
- Height: 1.76 m (5 ft 9 in)
- Position: Defender

Youth career
- TJ Jacovce
- Kablo Topoľčany

Senior career*
Years	Team	Apps	(Gls)
1973–1980	Inter Bratislava		
1980–1981	Dukla Banská Bystrica	26	(4)
1981–1984	Inter Bratislava	82	(7)
1984–1989	St. Gallen	129	(4)
1989–1991	Chur 97	31	(2)

International career
1974–1983	Czechoslovakia	57	(3)
1975	Czechoslovakia Olympic	1	(0)

Managerial career
- 1989–1992: Chur 97
- 1992–1993: Sturm Graz
- 1993–1994: Spartak Trnava
- 1994–1996: Kapfenberg
- 1997–1998: Tauris Rimavská Sobota
- 1998–1999: Ružomberok
- 1999–2000: KOBA Senec
- 2000–2001: Žilina
- 2002–2003: Slovakia
- 2004: Slovakia U21
- 2004–2005: Žilina
- 2006–2008: Inter Bratislava
- 2008: Slovácko
- 2010: Ružomberok
- 2011: Ružomberok
- 2011–2012: Nitra
Medal record
Representing Czechoslovakia
UEFA European Championship
Winner	1976 Yugoslavia
- * Club domestic league appearances and goals

Ladislav Jurkemik (born 20 July 1953) is a former Slovak football player and later a football manager. He played in the Czechoslovak First League for Inter Bratislava and Dukla Banská Bystrica. Jurkemik played internationally for Czechoslovakia; he played a total of 57 matches and scored 3 goals. He managed Slovakia in 2002 and 2003.

== Playing career ==
Jurkemik played in his domestic Czechoslovak First League from 1973 to 1984, with two periods at Inter Bratislava interrupted by the 1980–81 season, which he spent at Dukla Banská Bystrica. He subsequently went to the Swiss league, where he played for FC St. Gallen.

Jurkemik was involved in three major tournaments as a player of Czechoslovakia. He was a participant in the 1976 UEFA European Championship, where Czechoslovakia won the gold medal, in the 1980 UEFA European Championship, where Czechoslovakia won the bronze medal, and at the 1982 FIFA World Cup. He also played one match for the Olympic team in 1975.

== Management career ==
After his playing career Jurkemik became a manager, taking charge of various club sides as well as the Slovakia national football team. In 2008 he took charge of 1. FC Slovácko in the Czech Second League, his first appointment in the Czech Republic. He was relieved of his duties in December 2008 with the club 14th in the league and just two points above the relegation zone. Jurkemik managed FC Nitra but became the second departing manager of the 2012–13 Slovak First Football League after an eight-game winless streak left Nitra bottom of the league after 15 matches in November 2012.

== Honours ==
=== Player ===
Czechoslovakia

- UEFA Euro 1976: Winner
- UEFA Euro 1980: Third place
- 1982 FIFA World Cup: Group stage
