= UEFA Euro 1976 =

European football competition

1976 UEFA European Football Championship
Europsko prvenstvo u nogometu Jugoslavija 1976. (in Croatian) Европско првенство во фудбал Jугославиjа 1976 (in Macedonian) Европско првенство у фудбалу Jугославиjа 1976 (in Serbian) Evropsko prvenstvo v nogometu Jugoslavija 1976 (in Slovene)

Tournament details
- Host country: Yugoslavia
- Dates: 16–20 June
- Teams: 4
- Venues: 2 (in 2 host cities)

Final positions
- Champions: Czechoslovakia (1st title)
- Runners-up: West Germany
- Third place: Netherlands
- Fourth place: Yugoslavia

Tournament statistics
- Matches played: 4
- Goals scored: 19 (4.75 per match)
- Attendance: 106,087 (26,522 per match)
- Top scorer: (West Germany) Dieter Müller (4 goals)
- Best player: (Czechoslovakia) Antonín Panenka

The 1976 UEFA European Football Championship tournament was held in Yugoslavia. This was the fifth UEFA European Championship, held every four years and endorsed by UEFA and the only tournament that was held in a socialist state. The final tournament took place between 16 and 20 June 1976.

Only four countries played in the final tournament, with the tournament consisting of the semi-finals, a third place play-off, and the final. This was the last tournament to have this format, as the tournament was expanded to include eight teams four years later. It was the only time that all four matches in the final tournament were decided after extra time, either on penalties or by goals scored. This was also the last tournament in which the hosts had to qualify for the final stage.

Czechoslovakia won the tournament after defeating holders West Germany in the final on penalties following a 2–2 draw after extra time. Antonín Panenka gained fame for his delicately chipped penalty, which has since been named after him, to win the penalty shootout and Czechoslovakia's only European Championship title.

== Qualification ==
The qualifying round was played in 1974, 1975 (group phase), and 1976 (quarter-finals). There were eight qualifying groups of four teams each, with matches played on a home-and-away basis. The group winners qualified for the quarter-finals, played in two legs, home and away. The winners of the quarter-finals would go through to the final tournament.

This was the first time the Soviet Union failed to qualify for the finals.

== Quarterfinals ==
Team 1	Agg.	Team 2	1st leg	2nd leg
**Yugoslavia**	3–1	Wales	2–0	1–1
Spain	1–3	**West Germany**	1–1	0–2
**Czechoslovakia**	4–2	Soviet Union	2–0	2–2
**Netherlands**	7–1	Belgium	5–0	2–1

=== Qualified teams ===
Team	Qualified as	Qualified on	Previous appearances in tournament (Note: Bold indicates champion for that year.)
Czechoslovakia	Quarter-final winner	22 May 1976	1 (1960)
Netherlands	Quarter-final winner	22 May 1976	0 (debut)
West Germany	Quarter-final winner	22 May 1976	1 (**1972**)
Yugoslavia (host)	Quarter-final winner	22 May 1976	2 (1960, 1968)

Alternate logo for the tournament

== Venues ==
UEFA Euro 1976 is located in Yugoslavia	Belgrade	Zagreb
UEFA Euro 1976 is located in Yugoslavia	Red Star Stadium	Stadion Maksimir
UEFA Euro 1976 is located in Yugoslavia	Capacity: **90,000**	Capacity: **55,000**

== Match officials ==
Country	Referee
Belgium	Alfred Delcourt
Italy	Sergio Gonella
Switzerland	Walter Hungerbühler
Wales	Clive Thomas

== Final tournament ==
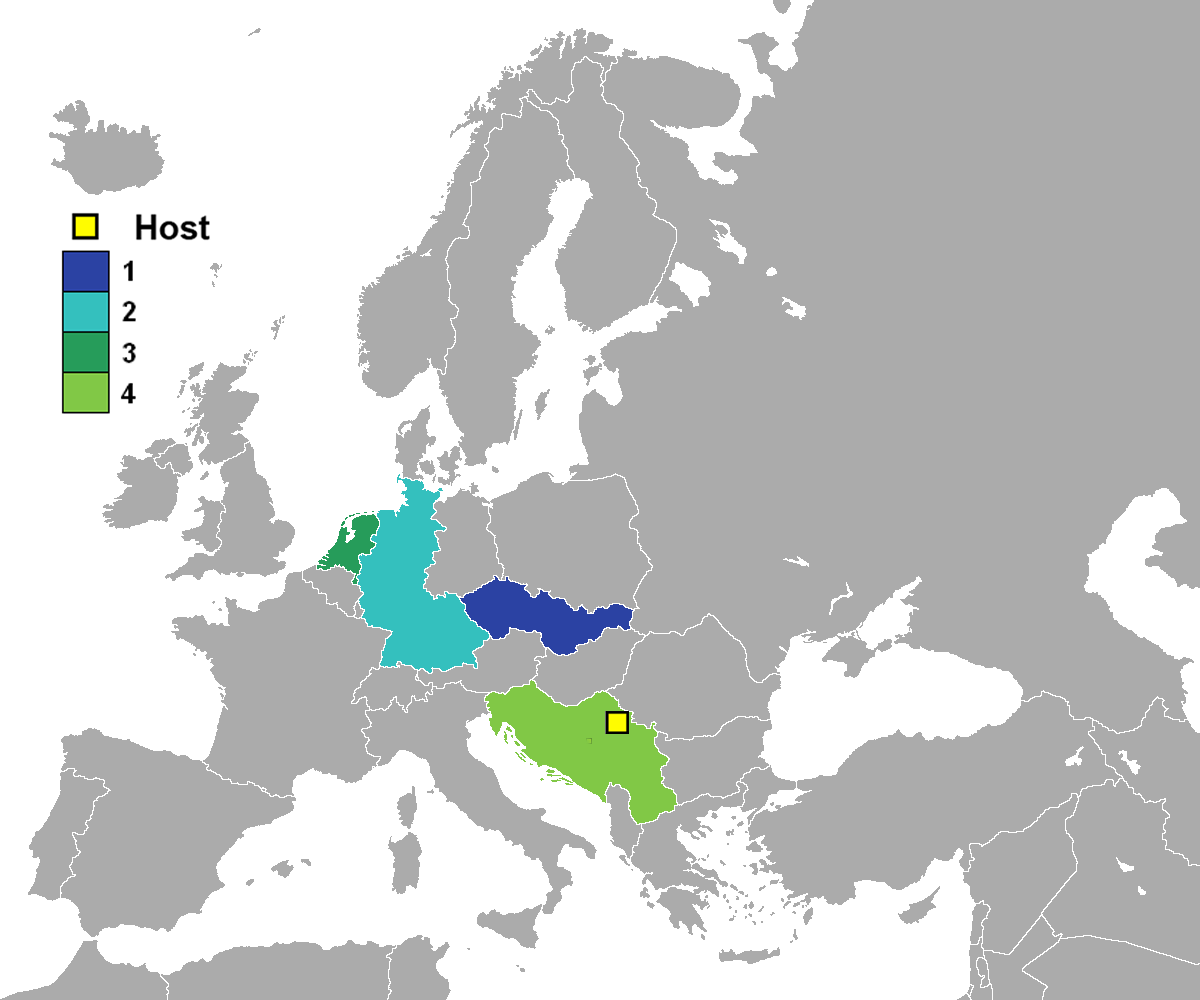
1976 UEFA European Football Championship finalists

At the final tournament, extra time and a penalty shoot-out were used to decide the winner if necessary.

All times are local, CET (UTC+1).

=== Bracket ===
Semi-finals
16 June – Zagreb
**Czechoslovakia (a.e.t.)**	**3**
Netherlands	1
17 June – Belgrade
Yugoslavia	2
**West Germany (a.e.t.)**	**4**

Final
20 June – Belgrade
**Czechoslovakia (p)**	**2 (5)**
West Germany	2 (3)
Third place play-off
19 June – Zagreb
**Netherlands (a.e.t.)**	**3**
Yugoslavia	2

=== Semi-finals ===
16 June 1976
20:15

Czechoslovakia	3–1 (a.e.t.)	Netherlands
Ondruš 19'; Nehoda 114'; Veselý 118'	Report	Ondruš 73' (o.g.)

Stadion Maksimir, Zagreb
Attendance: 17,879
Referee: Clive Thomas (Wales)

17 June 1976
20:15

Yugoslavia	2–4 (a.e.t.)	West Germany
Popivoda 19'; Džajić 30'	Report	Flohe 64'; Müller 82', 115', 119'

Red Star Stadium, Belgrade
Attendance: 50,652
Referee: Alfred Delcourt (Belgium)

=== Third place play-off ===
19 June 1976
20:15

Netherlands	3–2 (a.e.t.)	Yugoslavia
Geels 27', 107'; W. van de Kerkhof 39'	Report	Katalinski 43'; Džajić 82'

Stadion Maksimir, Zagreb
Attendance: 6,766
Referee: Walter Hungerbühler (Switzerland)

=== Final ===
20 June 1976
20:15

Czechoslovakia	2–2 (a.e.t.)	West Germany
Švehlík 8'; Dobiaš 25'	Report; Positions	Müller 28'; Hölzenbein 89'
Penalties
Masný (penalty scored); Nehoda (penalty scored); Ondruš (penalty scored); Jurkemik (penalty scored); Panenka (penalty scored)	5–3	(penalty scored) Bonhof; (penalty scored) Flohe; (penalty scored) Bongartz; (penalty missed) Hoeneß

Red Star Stadium, Belgrade
Attendance: 30,790
Referee: Sergio Gonella (Italy)

== Statistics ==
=== Goalscorers ===
There were 19 goals scored in 4 matches, for an average of 4.75 goals per match.

4 goals

- (West Germany) Dieter Müller

2 goals

- (Netherlands) Ruud Geels
- (Socialist Federal Republic of Yugoslavia) Dragan Džajić

1 goal

- (Czechoslovakia) Karol Dobiaš
- (Czechoslovakia) Zdeněk Nehoda
- (Czechoslovakia) Anton Ondruš
- (Czechoslovakia) Ján Švehlík
- (Czechoslovakia) František Veselý
- (Netherlands) Willy van de Kerkhof
- (West Germany) Heinz Flohe
- (West Germany) Bernd Hölzenbein
- (Socialist Federal Republic of Yugoslavia) Josip Katalinski
- (Socialist Federal Republic of Yugoslavia) Danilo Popivoda

1 own goal

- (Czechoslovakia) Anton Ondruš (against Netherlands)

=== Awards ===
UEFA Team of the Tournament

Goalkeeper	Defenders	Midfielders	Forwards
(Czechoslovakia) Ivo Viktor	(Czechoslovakia) Anton Ondruš (Czechoslovakia) Ján Pivarník (Netherlands) Ruud Krol (West Germany) Franz Beckenbauer	(Czechoslovakia) Antonín Panenka (Czechoslovakia) Jaroslav Pollák (West Germany) Rainer Bonhof (Socialist Federal Republic of Yugoslavia) Dragan Džajić	(Czechoslovakia) Zdeněk Nehoda (West Germany) Dieter Müller
