= 1979–80 UEFA Cup =

9th season of Europe's secondary club football tournament organised by UEFA

Tournament details
- Dates: 19 September 1979 – 21 May 1980
- Teams: 64

Final positions
- Champions: (West Germany) Eintracht Frankfurt (1st title)
- Runners-up: (West Germany) Borussia Mönchengladbach

Tournament statistics
- Matches played: 126
- Goals scored: 352 (2.79 per match)
- Attendance: 3,074,766 (24,403 per match)
- Top scorer(s): Dieter Hoeneß (Bayern Munich); Harald Nickel (Borussia Mönchengladbach); 7 goals each

The 1979–80 UEFA Cup was the ninth season of the UEFA Cup, the third-tier club football competition organised by UEFA. The final was played in West Germany over two legs, at the Bökelbergstadion., Mönchengladbach, and at the Waldstadion, Frankfurt. It was won by Eintracht Frankfurt, who defeated title holders and fellow West German side Borussia Mönchengladbach on the away goals rule after a 3–3 aggregate draw to claim their first UEFA Cup title.

The competition was notable for the dominance of West German teams, who were only knocked out of the tournament among themselves, setting up for an all-German final, the first out of the two ever played in UEFA history. All four semi-finalists came from West Germany, with this being the only instance in a UEFA club competition, and one of them defeated the fifth team in the quarter-finals.

This was the last edition of the UEFA Cup where the 64 spots were allocated to the respective associations by the invitation method inherited from the Inter-Cities Fairs Cup. Beginning in 1980, the newly introduced UEFA country rankings would determine the number of teams for each country, based on results from the five-year period preceding the last completed season.

== Association team allocation ==
A total of 64 teams from 31 UEFA member associations participate in the 1979–80 UEFA Cup. The original allocation scheme was as follows:

- 3 associations have four teams qualify.
- 3 associations have three teams qualify.
- 18 associations have two teams qualify.
- 7 associations have one team qualify.

Czechoslovakia was the only association selected to have an extra third birth for this season, while Bulgaria and East Germany went back to two qualified teams. The remaining spot went to West Germany for title holders Borussia Mönchengladbach. With this being the last season before the introduction of the UEFA rankings, only four of the 20 two-team associations had never been chosen for the extra third birth over eight seasons of rotation: Greece, Turkey, Denmark and Norway.

Associations in the 1979-80 UEFA Cup

Five teams
West Germany
Four teams
England
Italy
Three teams
Spain
Czechoslovakia

Two teams
Netherlands	Belgium	Soviet Union
East Germany	France	(Socialist Federal Republic of Yugoslavia) Yugoslavia
Hungary	Portugal	Poland
Scotland	Greece	Switzerland
Bulgaria	Austria	Sweden
Turkey	Romania	Denmark
Norway		

One team
(Northern Ireland) Northern Ireland
(Republic of Ireland) Republic of Ireland
Finland
Cyprus
Malta
Iceland
Luxembourg

Did not compete
Wales
Albania

Wales: There was no national league in Wales before 1992 and the only competition organised by the Football Association of Wales was the Welsh Cup so Wales had just a single participant in European competitions, the winner (or best placed Welsh team as several English teams also competed) of the Welsh Cup which competed in the UEFA Cup Winners' Cup.
Albania: Although Albanian teams returned to European competition in 1978 after five years of absence, the country choose to not participate in the UEFA Cup until 1981. Vllaznia would have qualified for the UEFA Cup by league position.

=== Teams ===
The labels in the parentheses show how each team qualified for competition:

- TH: Title holders
- CW: Cup winners
- CR: Cup runners-up
- LC: League Cup winners
- 2nd, 3rd, 4th, 5th, 6th, etc.: League position
- P-W: End-of-season European competition play-offs winners

Qualified teams for 1979–80 UEFA Cup
(West Germany) Borussia Mönchengladbach (TH)	(West Germany) Stuttgart (2nd)	(West Germany) Kaiserslautern (3rd)	(West Germany) Bayern Munich (4th)
(West Germany) Eintracht Frankfurt (5th)	(England) West Bromwich Albion (2nd)	(England) Everton (3rd)	(England) Leeds United (4th)
(England) Ipswich Town (5th)	(Italy) Perugia (2nd)	(Italy) Internazionale (4th)	(Italy) Torino (5th)
(Italy) Napoli (6th)	(Spain) Sporting Gijón (2nd)	(Spain) Atlético Madrid (3rd)	(Spain) Real Sociedad (4th)
(Czechoslovakia) Baník Ostrava (2nd)	(Czechoslovakia) Zbrojovka Brno (3rd)	(Czechoslovakia) Bohemians Prague (4th)	(Netherlands) Feyenoord (2nd)
(Netherlands) PSV Eindhoven (3rd)	(Belgium) Anderlecht (2nd)	(Belgium) Standard Liège (3rd)	(Soviet Union) Dynamo Kyiv (2nd)
(Soviet Union) Shakhtar Donetsk (3rd)	(East Germany) Dynamo Dresden (2nd)	(East Germany) Carl Zeiss Jena (3rd)	(France) Saint-Étienne (3rd)
(France) Monaco (4th)	(Socialist Federal Republic of Yugoslavia) Dinamo Zagreb (2nd)	(Socialist Federal Republic of Yugoslavia) Red Star Belgrade (3rd)	(Hungary) Ferencváros (2nd)
(Hungary) Diósgyőr (3rd)	(Portugal) Benfica (2nd)	(Portugal) Sporting CP (3rd)	(Poland) Widzew Łódź (2nd)
(Poland) Stal Mielec (3rd)	(Scotland) Dundee United (3rd)	(Scotland) Aberdeen (4th)	(Greece) Olympiacos (2nd)
(Greece) Aris (3rd)	(Switzerland) Zürich (2nd)	(Switzerland) Grasshoppers (3rd)	(Bulgaria) CSKA Sofia (2nd)
(Bulgaria) Lokomotiv Sofia (3rd)	(Austria) Wiener Sport-Club (2nd)	(Austria) Rapid Wien (3rd)	(Sweden) Malmö (2nd)
(Sweden) Kalmar (4th)	(Turkey) Galatasaray (2nd)	(Turkey) Orduspor (4th)	(Romania) Dinamo București (2nd)
(Romania) Universitatea Craiova (4th)	(Denmark) Esbjerg (2nd)	(Denmark) AGF (3rd)	(Norway) Viking FK (3rd)
(Norway) Skeid (4th)	(Northern Ireland) Glenavon (2nd)	(Republic of Ireland) Bohemians (2nd)	(Finland) KPT Kuopio (2nd)
(Cyprus) Alki Larnaca (3rd)	(Malta) Valletta (2nd)	(Iceland) Keflavík (3rd)	(Luxembourg) FC Progrès Niederkorn (2nd)

== Schedule ==
The schedule of the competition was as follows. Matches were scheduled for Wednesdays, though some matches in the first two rounds exceptionally took place on Tuesdays or Thursdays. Also, the second leg of the semi-finals was played on a Tuesday.

Schedule for 1979–80 UEFA Cup
Round	First leg	Second leg
First round	18–26 September 1979	2–4 October 1979
Second round	24 October 1979	7–8 November 1979
Third round	28 November 1979	12 December 1979
Quarter-finals	5 March 1980	19 March 1980
Semi-finals	9 April 1980	22 April 1980
Final	7 May 1980	21 May 1980

== Bracket ==
Third round
(Switzerland) Grasshoppers	0	0	0
(West Germany) Stuttgart	2	3	5
(Bulgaria) Lokomotiv Sofia (a)	1	1	2
(Soviet Union) Dynamo Kyiv	0	2	2
(France) Saint-Étienne	4	3	7
(Greece) Aris Thessaloniki	1	3	4
(West Germany) Borussia Mönchengladbach	2	0	2
(Romania) Universitatea Craiova	0	1	1
(Hungary) Diósgyőri VTK	0	1	1
(West Germany) Kaiserslautern	2	6	8
(West Germany) Bayern Munich	2	2	4
(Socialist Federal Republic of Yugoslavia) Red Star Belgrade	0	3	3
(West Germany) Eintracht Frankfurt	4	0	4
(Netherlands) Feyenoord	1	1	2
(Belgium) Standard Liège	1	2	3
(Czechoslovakia) Zbrojovka Brno	2	3	5

Quarter-finals
(West Germany) Stuttgart	3	1	4
(Bulgaria) Lokomotiv Sofia	1	0	1
(France) Saint-Étienne	1	0	1
(West Germany) Borussia Mönchengladbach	4	2	6
(West Germany) Kaiserslautern	1	1	2
(West Germany) Bayern Munich	0	4	4
(West Germany) Eintracht Frankfurt	4	2	6
(Czechoslovakia) Zbrojovka Brno	1	3	4

Semi-finals
(West Germany) Stuttgart	2	0	2
(West Germany) Borussia Mönchengladbach	1	2	3
(West Germany) Bayern Munich	2	1	3
(West Germany) Eintracht Frankfurt (aet)	0	5	5

Final
(West Germany) Borussia Mönchengladbach	3	0	3
(West Germany) Eintracht Frankfurt (a)	2	1	3

== First round ==
Team 1	Agg.	Team 2	1st leg	2nd leg
Zbrojovka Brno (Czechoslovakia)	7–1	(Denmark) Esbjerg	6–0	1–1
AGF (Denmark)	2–1	(Poland) Stal Mielec	1–1	1–0
Aberdeen (Scotland)	1–2	(West Germany) Eintracht Frankfurt	1–1	0–1
Aris Thessaloniki (Greece)	4–3	(Portugal) Benfica	3–1	1–2
Atlético Madrid (Spain)	1–5	(East Germany) Dynamo Dresden	1–2	0–3
Borussia Mönchengladbach (West Germany)	4–1	(Norway) Viking	3–0	1–1
Dinamo București (Romania)	12–0	(Cyprus) Alki Larnaca	3–0	9–0
Dundee United (Scotland)	1–1 (a)	(Belgium) Anderlecht	0–0	1–1
Bohemians Praha (Czechoslovakia)	2–4	(West Germany) Bayern Munich	0–2	2–2
Carl Zeiss Jena (East Germany)	4–1	(England) West Bromwich Albion	2–0	2–1
Dynamo Kyiv (Soviet Union)	3–2	(Bulgaria) CSKA Sofia	2–1	1–1
Progrès Niederkorn (Luxembourg)	0–6	(Switzerland) Grasshoppers	0–2	0–4
Shakhtar Donetsk (Soviet Union)	2–3	(France) Monaco	2–1	0–2
Feyenoord (Netherlands)	2–0	(England) Everton	1–0	1–0
Zürich (Switzerland)	2–8	(West Germany) Kaiserslautern	1–3	1–5
Galatasaray (Turkey)	1–3	(Socialist Federal Republic of Yugoslavia) Red Star Belgrade	0–0	1–3
Glenavon (Northern Ireland)	0–2	(Belgium) Standard Liège	0–1	0–1
Inter Milan (Italy)	3–2	(Spain) Real Sociedad	3–0	0–2
Kalmar FF (Sweden)	2–2 (a)	(Iceland) Keflavík	2–1	0–1
KPT (Finland)	1–4	(Sweden) Malmö FF	1–2	0–2
Napoli (Italy)	2–1	(Greece) Olympiacos	2–0	0–1
Orduspor (Turkey)	2–6	(Czechoslovakia) Baník Ostrava	2–0	0–6
Perugia (Italy)	1–0	(Socialist Federal Republic of Yugoslavia) Dinamo Zagreb	1–0	0–0
Lokomotiv Sofia (Bulgaria)	3–2	(Hungary) Ferencváros	3–0	0–2
Rapid Wien (Austria)	2–4	(Hungary) Diósgyőri VTK	0–1	2–3
Skeid (Norway)	1–10	(England) Ipswich Town	1–3	0–7
Sporting CP (Portugal)	2–0	(Republic of Ireland) Bohemians	2–0	0–0
Sporting Gijón (Spain)	0–1	(Netherlands) PSV Eindhoven	0–0	0–1
Valletta (Malta)	0–7	(England) Leeds United	0–4	0–3
Stuttgart (West Germany)	2–2 (a)	(Italy) Torino	1–0	1–2 (a.e.t.)
Widzew Łódź (Poland)	2–4	(France) Saint-Étienne	2–1	0–3
Wiener Sport-Club (Austria)	1–3	(Romania) Universitatea Craiova	0–0	1–3

=== First leg ===
19 September 1979

Zbrojovka Brno (Czechoslovakia)	6–0	(Denmark) Esbjerg
Mazura 17'; Janečka 53', 75'; Kroupa 55'; Jarůšek 72', 87'	Report

Městský fotbalový stadion Srbská, Brno
Attendance: 12,000
Referee: Franz Latzin (Austria)

19 September 1979

AGF (Denmark)	1–1	(Poland) Stal Mielec
Olsen 55'	Report	Karaś 64'

Aarhus Stadium, Aarhus
Attendance: 4,300
Referee: Malcolm Moffatt (Northern Ireland)

19 September 1979

Aberdeen (Scotland)	1–1	(West Germany) Eintracht Frankfurt
Harper 53'	Report	Cha 12'

Pittodrie Stadium, Aberdeen
Attendance: 18,000
Referee: Luigi Agnolin (Italy)

19 September 1979

Aris Thessaloniki (Greece)	3–1	(Portugal) Benfica
Ballis 17'; Pallas 21' (pen.); Zindros 58'	Report	Reinaldo 30'

Aris Stadium, Thessaloniki
Attendance: 15,280
Referee: Bogdan Dochev (Bulgaria)

19 September 1979

Atlético Madrid (Spain)	1–2	(East Germany) Dynamo Dresden
Cano 46'	Report	Häfner 56'; Weber 85'

Vicente Calderón Stadium, Madrid
Attendance: 38,000
Referee: Ernst Dörflinger (Switzerland)

19 September 1979

Borussia Mönchengladbach (West Germany)	3–0	(Norway) Viking
Lienen 11'; Nickel 42'; Kulik 79'	Report

Bökelbergstadion, Mönchengladbach
Attendance: 7,500
Referee: Marijan Rauš (Yugoslavia)

19 September 1979

Dinamo București (Romania)	3–0	(Cyprus) Alki Larnaca
Mulțescu 34'; Georgescu 40'; Vrînceanu 56'	Report

Stadionul Dinamo, Bucharest
Attendance: 12,000
Referee: Arsen Hoxha (Albania)

19 September 1979

Dundee United (Scotland)	0–0	(Belgium) Anderlecht
	Report

Tannadice Park, Dundee
Attendance: 13,177
Referee: Reidar Bjørnestad (Norway)

19 September 1979

Bohemians Praha (Czechoslovakia)	0–2	(West Germany) Bayern Munich
	Report	Kraus 26'; Rummenigge 74'

Stadion Letná, Prague
Attendance: 31,000
Referee: Michel Vautrot (France)

19 September 1979

Carl Zeiss Jena (East Germany)	2–0	(England) West Bromwich Albion
Schnuphase 36'; Lindemann 64'	Report

Ernst-Abbe-Sportfeld, Jena
Attendance: 16,000
Referee: Emilio Guruceta Muro (Spain)

19 September 1979
19:00

Dynamo Kyiv (Soviet Union)	2–1	(Bulgaria) CSKA Sofia
Bezsonov 1'; Demyanenko 52'	Report	Metodiev 34'

Dynamo Stadium, Kyiv (Note: Dynamo Kyiv played their home matches at Dynamo Stadium, Kyiv, instead of their regular stadium Central Stadium, Kyiv, due to reconstruction.)
Attendance: 17,000
Referee: Constantin Ghiță (Romania)

26 September 1979

Progrès Niederkorn (Luxembourg)	0–2	(Switzerland) Grasshoppers
	Report	Hermann 53'; Egli 79'

Stade du Thillenberg, Differdange
Attendance: 2,500
Referee: Alain Delmer (France)

19 September 1979
19:00

Shakhtar Donetsk (Soviet Union)	2–1	(France) Monaco
Sokolovsky 48', 70'	Report	Petit 80'

Lokomotyv Stadium, Donetsk
Attendance: 44,000
Referee: Heinz Fahnler (Austria)

19 September 1979

Feyenoord (Netherlands)	1–0	(England) Everton
Notten 28'	Report

De Kuip, Rotterdam
Attendance: 32,970
Referee: Károly Palotai (Hungary)

19 September 1979

Zürich (Switzerland)	1–3	(West Germany) Kaiserslautern
Zwicker 83'	Report	Neues 20' (pen.); Bongartz 82'; Wolf 85'

Letzigrund, Zürich
Attendance: 18,000
Referee: Alexis Ponnet (Belgium)

19 September 1979

Galatasaray (Turkey)	0–0	(Socialist Federal Republic of Yugoslavia) Red Star Belgrade
	Report

İnönü Stadium, Istanbul
Attendance: 10,547
Referee: Franz Wöhrer (Austria)

18 September 1979

Glenavon (Northern Ireland)	0–1	(Belgium) Standard Liège
	Report	Edström 68'

Mourneview Park, Lurgan
Attendance: 2,500
Referee: Henk van Ettekoven (Netherlands)

19 September 1979

Inter Milan (Italy)	3–0	(Spain) Real Sociedad
Muraro 46'; Baresi 48'; Marini 76'	Report

San Siro, Milan
Attendance: 53,000
Referee: António Garrido (Portugal)

19 September 1979

Kalmar FF (Sweden)	2–1	(Iceland) Keflavík
Sunesson 3'; Sandberg 24'	Report	Margeirsson 70'

Fredriksskans, Kalmar
Attendance: 1,360
Referee: Mauri Laakso (Finland)

19 September 1979

KPT (Finland)	1–2	(Sweden) Malmö FF
Pirinen 87'	Report	Andersson 29'; Prytz 52' (pen.)

Väinölänniemen stadion, Kuopio
Attendance: 1,435
Referee: Rolf Haugen (Norway)

19 September 1979

Napoli (Italy)	2–0	(Greece) Olympiacos
Damiani 27' (pen.); Agostinelli 90+1'	Report

Stadio San Paolo, Naples
Attendance: 62,031
Referee: Heinz Aldinger (West Germany)

19 September 1979

Orduspor (Turkey)	2–0	(Czechoslovakia) Baník Ostrava
Umanç 28'; Güney 57'	Report

19 Eylül Stadium, Ordu
Attendance: 3,917
Referee: Nikola Dudin (Bulgaria)

19 September 1979

Perugia (Italy)	1–0	(Socialist Federal Republic of Yugoslavia) Dinamo Zagreb
Vujadinović 43' (o.g.)	Report

Stadio Renato Curi, Perugia
Attendance: 26,000
Referee: Nicolae Rainea (Romania)

18 September 1979

Lokomotiv Sofia (Bulgaria)	3–0	(Hungary) Ferencváros
Dangov 28'; Velichkov 48'; Sokolov 66'	Report

Vasil Levski National Stadium, Sofia
Attendance: 9,800
Referee: Dušan Krchňák (Czechoslovakia)

19 September 1979

Rapid Wien (Austria)	0–1	(Hungary) Diósgyőri VTK
	Report	Fükő 86'

Gerhard Hanappi Stadium, Vienna
Attendance: 12,000
Referee: Paolo Casarin (Italy)

19 September 1979

Skeid (Norway)	1–3	(England) Ipswich Town
Rein 5'	Report	Mills 10'; Turner 35'; Mariner 53'

Ullevaal Stadion, Oslo
Attendance: 3,190
Referee: Ole Amundsen (Denmark)

19 September 1979

Sporting CP (Portugal)	2–0	(Republic of Ireland) Bohemians
Manoel 20', 68'	Report

Estádio José Alvalade, Lisbon
Attendance: 30,000
Referee: Georges Konrath (France)

19 September 1979

Sporting Gijón (Spain)	0–0	(Netherlands) PSV Eindhoven
	Report

El Molinón, Gijón
Attendance: 28,000
Referee: Volker Roth (West Germany)

19 September 1979

Valletta (Malta)	0–4	(England) Leeds United
	Report	Graham 12', 46', 53'; Hart 33'

Empire Stadium, Gżira
Attendance: 18,735
Referee: Rudolf Renggli (Switzerland)

19 September 1979

Stuttgart (West Germany)	1–0	(Italy) Torino
Kelsch 70'	Report

Neckarstadion, Stuttgart
Attendance: 55,000
Referee: César Correia (Portugal)

19 September 1979

Widzew Łódź (Poland)	2–1	(France) Saint-Étienne
Boniek 66'; Kowenicki 82'	Report	Platini 36'

Stadion Miejski, Łódź
Attendance: 30,000
Referee: Rolf Nyhus (Norway)

19 September 1979

Wiener Sport-Club (Austria)	0–0	(Romania) Universitatea Craiova
	Report

Weststadion, Vienna
Attendance: 9,000
Referee: Marian Środecki (Poland)

=== Second leg ===
3 October 1979

Esbjerg (Denmark)	1–1	(Czechoslovakia) Zbrojovka Brno
Bach 74'	Report	Jarůšek 61'

Esbjerg Stadium, Esbjerg
Attendance: 1,300
Referee: Brian McGinlay (Scotland)

Zbrojovka Brno won 7–1 on aggregate.

3 October 1979

Stal Mielec (Poland)	0–1	(Denmark) AGF
	Report	Jensen 81'

Stadion Miejski, Mielec
Attendance: 10,000
Referee: İhsan Türe (Turkey)

AGF won 2–1 on aggregate.

3 October 1979

Eintracht Frankfurt (West Germany)	1–0	(Scotland) Aberdeen
Hölzenbein 50'	Report

Waldstadion, Frankfurt
Attendance: 21,000
Referee: Augusto Lamo Castillo (Spain)

Eintracht Frankfurt won 2–1 on aggregate.

3 October 1979

Benfica (Portugal)	2–1	(Greece) Aris Thessaloniki
Reinaldo 21'; Gomes 50'	Report	Semertzidis 80'

Estádio da Luz, Lisbon
Attendance: 46,059
Referee: George Courtney (England)

Aris Thessaloniki won 4–3 on aggregate.

3 October 1979

Dynamo Dresden (East Germany)	3–0	(Spain) Atlético Madrid
Riedel 21'; Ruiz 36' (o.g.); Weber 47'	Report

Rudolf-Harbig-Stadion, Dresden
Attendance: 37,000
Referee: Erik Fredriksson (Sweden)

Dynamo Dresden won 5–1 on aggregate.

3 October 1979

Viking (Norway)	1–1	(West Germany) Borussia Mönchengladbach
Bjørnsen 44'	Report	Kulik 61'

Stavanger Stadion, Stavanger
Attendance: 7,189
Referee: Gwyn Owen (Wales)

Borussia Mönchengladbach won 4–1 on aggregate.

4 October 1979

Alki Larnaca (Cyprus)	0–9	(Romania) Dinamo București
	Report	Georgescu 9' (pen.), 46', 67'; Augustin 20'; Vrînceanu 21', 75'; Țălnar 52'; Mulțescu 54'; Moldovan 61'

GSZ Stadium, Larnaca
Attendance: 2,000
Referee: Edward Morgan (Wales)

Dinamo București won 12–0 on aggregate.

2 October 1979

Anderlecht (Belgium)	1–1	(Scotland) Dundee United
Nielsen 25'	Report	Kopel 80'

Émile Versé Stadium, Brussels
Attendance: 19,066
Referee: Adolf Prokop (East Germany)

1–1 on aggregate; Dundee United won on away goals.

3 October 1979

Bayern Munich (West Germany)	2–2	(Czechoslovakia) Bohemians Praha
Rummenigge 55'; Breitner 84' (pen.)	Report	Ondra 83'; Prokeš 85'

Olympiastadion, Munich
Attendance: 18,000
Referee: Iordan Zhezhov (Bulgaria)

Bayern Munich won 4–2 on aggregate.

3 October 1979

West Bromwich Albion (England)	1–2	(East Germany) Carl Zeiss Jena
Wile 33'	Report	Raab 6', 61' (pen.)

The Hawthorns, West Bromwich
Attendance: 19,376
Referee: Josef Bucek (Austria)

Carl Zeiss Jena won 4–1 on aggregate.

3 October 1979
18:30

CSKA Sofia (Bulgaria)	1–1	(Soviet Union) Dynamo Kyiv
Metodiev 62' (pen.)	Report	Buryak 60'

Vasil Levski National Stadium, Sofia (Note: CSKA Sofia played their home match at Vasil Levski National Stadium at 18:30 instead of their regular stadium Narodna Armia Stadium at 15:00 as initially planned due to lack of floodlights.)
Attendance: 26,000
Referee: Aleksander Suchanek (Poland)

Dynamo Kyiv won 3–2 on aggregate.

3 October 1979

Grasshoppers (Switzerland)	4–0	(Luxembourg) Progrès Niederkorn
Ponte 15'; Pfister 29'; Egli 36'; Hermann 86'	Report

Hardturm, Zürich
Attendance: 3,900
Referee: Richard Casha (Malta)

Grasshoppers won 6–0 on aggregate.

3 October 1979

Monaco (France)	2–0	(Soviet Union) Shakhtar Donetsk
Onnis 49'; Dalger 53'	Report

Stade Louis II, Monaco
Attendance: 10,325
Referee: Jan Redelfs (West Germany)

Monaco won 3–2 on aggregate.

3 October 1979

Everton (England)	0–1	(Netherlands) Feyenoord
	Report	Budding 76'

Goodison Park, Liverpool
Attendance: 28,203
Referee: Ulf Eriksson (Sweden)

Feyenoord won 2–0 on aggregate.

3 October 1979

Kaiserslautern (West Germany)	5–1	(Switzerland) Zürich
Melzer 15', 46'; Kaminke 29'; Wendt 54'; Geye 85'	Report	Zappa 16'

Fritz-Walter-Stadion, Kaiserslautern
Attendance: 14,160
Referee: Bob Valentine (Scotland)

Kaiserslautern won 8–2 on aggregate.

3 October 1979

Red Star Belgrade (Socialist Federal Republic of Yugoslavia)	3–1	(Turkey) Galatasaray
Savić 20', 73'; Milovanović 77'	Report	Tekin 76'

Red Star Stadium, Belgrade
Attendance: 24,801
Referee: Marcel Van Langenhove (Belgium)

Red Star Belgrade won 3–1 on aggregate.

3 October 1979

Standard Liège (Belgium)	1–0	(Northern Ireland) Glenavon
Edström 57'	Report

Stade Maurice Dufrasne, Liège
Attendance: 15,000
Referee: Marcel Hermann (Luxembourg)

Standard Liège won 2–0 on aggregate.

3 October 1979

Real Sociedad (Spain)	2–0	(Italy) Inter Milan
Satrústegui 22', 78'	Report

Atotxa Stadium, San Sebastián
Attendance: 18,198
Referee: Pat Partridge (England)

Inter Milan won 3–2 on aggregate.

3 October 1979

Keflavík (Iceland)	1–0	(Sweden) Kalmar FF
Andreasson 17' (o.g.)	Report

Keflavíkurvöllur, Keflavík
Attendance: 1,511
Referee: Eamonn Farrell (Republic of Ireland)

2–2 on aggregate; Keflavík won on away goals.

3 October 1979

Malmö FF (Sweden)	2–0	(Finland) KPT
Arvidsson 68', 79'	Report

Malmö IP, Malmö
Attendance: 3,715
Referee: Widukind Herrmann (East Germany)

Malmö FF won 4–1 on aggregate.

4 October 1979

Olympiacos (Greece)	1–0	(Italy) Napoli
Karavitis 37'	Report

Karaiskakis Stadium, Piraeus
Attendance: 34,213
Referee: Robert Wurtz (France)

Napoli won 2–1 on aggregate.

3 October 1979

Baník Ostrava (Czechoslovakia)	6–0	(Turkey) Orduspor
Knapp 20'; Vojáček 25'; Němec 30'; Lička 55', 63'; Daněk 68'	Report

Bazaly, Ostrava
Attendance: 15,000
Referee: Ib Nielsen (Denmark)

Baník Ostrava won 6–2 on aggregate.

3 October 1979

Dinamo Zagreb (Socialist Federal Republic of Yugoslavia)	0–0	(Italy) Perugia
	Report

Stadion Maksimir, Zagreb
Attendance: 35,000
Referee: Charles Corver (Netherlands)

Perugia won 1–0 on aggregate.

3 October 1979

Ferencváros (Hungary)	2–0	(Bulgaria) Lokomotiv Sofia
Pusztai 43'; Pogány 60' (pen.)	Report

Ferenc Puskás Stadium, Budapest
Attendance: 30,000
Referee: George Smith (Scotland)

Lokomotiv Sofia won 3–2 on aggregate.

3 October 1979

Diósgyőri VTK (Hungary)	3–2	(Austria) Rapid Wien
Szalai 9'; Fekete 17'; Tatár 83'	Report	Keglevits 42'; Sallmayer 61'

Diósgyőri Stadion, Miskolc
Attendance: 14,000
Referee: Walter Horstmann (West Germany)

Diósgyőri VTK won 4–2 on aggregate.

3 October 1979

Ipswich Town (England)	7–0	(Norway) Skeid
Wark 8'; Mühren 19', 23'; Thijssen 38'; Mariner 58'; McCall 63', 84'	Report

Portman Road, Ipswich
Attendance: 13,440
Referee: Eysteinn Guðmundsson (Iceland)

Ipswich Town won 10–1 on aggregate.

3 October 1979

Bohemians (Republic of Ireland)	0–0	(Portugal) Sporting CP
	Report

Dalymount Park, Dublin
Attendance: 2,200
Referee: Jean-Claude Jourquin (Belgium)

Sporting CP won 2–0 on aggregate.

3 October 1979

PSV Eindhoven (Netherlands)	1–0	(Spain) Sporting Gijón
W. van de Kerkhof 21'	Report

Philips Stadion, Eindhoven
Attendance: 24,100
Referee: John Hunting (England)

PSV Eindhoven won 1–0 on aggregate.

3 October 1979

Leeds United (England)	3–0	(Malta) Valletta
Curtis 1'; Hankin 17'; Hart 36'	Report

Elland Road, Leeds
Attendance: 13,682
Referee: Guðmundur Haraldsson (Iceland)

Leeds United won 7–0 on aggregate.

3 October 1979

Torino (Italy)	2–1 (a.e.t.)	(West Germany) Stuttgart
C. Sala 65'; Graziani 104'	Report	Ohlicher 120'

Stadio Comunale, Turin
Attendance: 54,920
Referee: Eldar Azimzade (Soviet Union)

2–2 on aggregate; Stuttgart won on away goals.

3 October 1979

Saint-Étienne (France)	3–0	(Poland) Widzew Łódź
Rep 25', 52' (pen.), 68'	Report

Stade Geoffroy-Guichard, Saint-Étienne
Attendance: 36,428
Referee: Ian Foote (Scotland)

Saint-Étienne won 4–2 on aggregate.

3 October 1979

Universitatea Craiova (Romania)	3–1	(Austria) Wiener Sport-Club
Cămătaru 24', 74'; Geolgău 49'	Report	Drabits 83'

Stadionul Central, Craiova
Attendance: 23,000
Referee: Nicolaos Lagoyannis (Greece)

Universitatea Craiova won 3–1 on aggregate.

== Second round ==
Team 1	Agg.	Team 2	1st leg	2nd leg
Zbrojovka Brno (Czechoslovakia)	5–2	(Iceland) Keflavík	3–1	2–1
AGF (Denmark)	2–5	(West Germany) Bayern Munich	1–2	1–3
Aris Thessaloniki (Greece)	4–1	(Italy) Perugia	1–1	3–0
Borussia Mönchengladbach (West Germany)	4–3	(Italy) Inter Milan	1–1	3–2 (a.e.t.)
Dinamo București (Romania)	2–3	(West Germany) Eintracht Frankfurt	2–0	0–3 (a.e.t.)
Dundee United (Scotland)	1–4	(Hungary) Diósgyőri VTK	0–1	1–3
Dynamo Dresden (East Germany)	1–1 (a)	(West Germany) Stuttgart	1–1	0–0
Baník Ostrava (Czechoslovakia)	1–2	(Soviet Union) Dynamo Kyiv	1–0	0–2
Universitatea Craiova (Romania)	4–0	(England) Leeds United	2–0	2–0
Feyenoord (Netherlands)	5–1	(Sweden) Malmö FF	4–0	1–1
Grasshoppers (Switzerland)	1–1 (a)	(England) Ipswich Town	0–0	1–1
Lokomotiv Sofia (Bulgaria)	5–4	(France) Monaco	4–2	1–2
PSV Eindhoven (Netherlands)	2–6	(France) Saint-Étienne	2–0	0–6
Red Star Belgrade (Socialist Federal Republic of Yugoslavia)	6–4	(East Germany) Carl Zeiss Jena	3–2	3–2
Sporting CP (Portugal)	1–3	(West Germany) Kaiserslautern	1–1	0–2
Standard Liège (Belgium)	3–2	(Italy) Napoli	2–1	1–1

=== First leg ===
24 October 1979

Zbrojovka Brno (Czechoslovakia)	3–1	(Iceland) Keflavík
Kotásek 43', 46'; Janečka 82'	Report	Georgsson 8'

Městský fotbalový stadion Srbská, Brno
Attendance: 7,500
Referee: Emmanuel Platopoulos (Greece)

24 October 1979

AGF (Denmark)	1–2	(West Germany) Bayern Munich
Sander 84'	Report	Rummenigge 41', 48'

Aarhus Stadium, Aarhus
Attendance: 21,500
Referee: Eamonn Farrell (Republic of Ireland)

24 October 1979

Aris Thessaloniki (Greece)	1–1	(Italy) Perugia
Semertzidis 64'	Report	Rossi 17'

Kleanthis Vikelidis Stadium, Thessaloniki
Attendance: 15,000
Referee: Marcel Van Langenhove (Belgium)

24 October 1979

Borussia Mönchengladbach (West Germany)	1–1	(Italy) Inter Milan
Hannes 39'	Report	Altobelli 53'

Bökelbergstadion, Mönchengladbach
Attendance: 36,500
Referee: Robert Wurtz (France)

24 October 1979

Dinamo București (Romania)	2–0	(West Germany) Eintracht Frankfurt
Mulțescu 22' (pen.); Augustin 88'	Report

Stadionul Dinamo, Bucharest
Attendance: 9,000
Referee: Ian Foote (Scotland)

24 October 1979

Dundee United (Scotland)	0–1	(Hungary) Diósgyőri VTK
	Report	Fekete 89'

Tannadice Park, Dundee
Attendance: 10,500
Referee: Anders Mattsson (Finland)

24 October 1979

Dynamo Dresden (East Germany)	1–1	(West Germany) Stuttgart
Weber 34' (pen.)	Report	Förster 44'

Rudolf-Harbig-Stadion, Dresden
Attendance: 37,000
Referee: Franz Wöhrer (Austria)

24 October 1979
14:45

Baník Ostrava (Czechoslovakia)	1–0	(Soviet Union) Dynamo Kyiv
Němec 51'	Report

Bazaly, Ostrava
Attendance: 15,067
Referee: László Pádár (Hungary)

24 October 1979

Universitatea Craiova (Romania)	2–0	(England) Leeds United
Balaci 12'; Irimescu 78'	Report

Stadionul Central, Craiova
Attendance: 35,000
Referee: Gianfranco Menegali (Italy)

24 October 1979

Feyenoord (Netherlands)	4–0	(Sweden) Malmö FF
Pétursson 1', 27' (pen.), 80' (pen.); van Deinsen 45'	Report

De Kuip, Rotterdam
Attendance: 36,376
Referee: Heinz Aldinger (West Germany)

24 October 1979

Grasshoppers (Switzerland)	0–0	(England) Ipswich Town
	Report

Hardturm, Zürich
Attendance: 16,000
Referee: Roger Schoeters (Belgium)

24 October 1979

Lokomotiv Sofia (Bulgaria)	4–2	(France) Monaco
Mihaylov 27', 36', 80' (pen.), 88'	Report	Onnis 75', 86' (pen.)

Vasil Levski National Stadium, Sofia
Attendance: 15,000
Referee: Jan Keizer (Netherlands)

24 October 1979

PSV Eindhoven (Netherlands)	2–0	(France) Saint-Étienne
W. van de Kerkhof 12'; Koster 61'	Report

Philips Stadion, Eindhoven
Attendance: 27,000
Referee: Rolf Eriksson (Sweden)

24 October 1979

Red Star Belgrade (Socialist Federal Republic of Yugoslavia)	3–2	(East Germany) Carl Zeiss Jena
Savić 12' (pen.); Muslin 24'; Šestić 77'	Report	Raab 63'; Vogel 66' (pen.)

Red Star Stadium, Belgrade
Attendance: 56,314
Referee: André Daina (Switzerland)

24 October 1979

Sporting CP (Portugal)	1–1	(West Germany) Kaiserslautern
Manoel 47'	Report	Bongartz 52'

Estádio José Alvalade, Lisbon
Attendance: 40,000
Referee: John Carpenter (Republic of Ireland)

24 October 1979

Standard Liège (Belgium)	2–1	(Italy) Napoli
Plessers 50'; Sigurvinsson 56' (pen.)	Report	Capone 25'

Stade Maurice Dufrasne, Liège
Attendance: 22,632
Referee: Emilio Guruceta Muro (Spain)

=== Second leg ===
8 November 1979

Keflavík (Iceland)	1–2	(Czechoslovakia) Zbrojovka Brno
Ólafsson 83'	Report	Kroupa 25'; Vojtek 65'

Laugardalsvöllur, Reykjavík
Attendance: 1,706
Referee: Torben Månsson (Denmark)

Zbrojovka Brno won 5–2 on aggregate.

7 November 1979

Bayern Munich (West Germany)	3–1	(Denmark) AGF
Hoeneß 30', 89'; Breitner 83'	Report	Mikkelsen 40'

Olympiastadion, Munich
Attendance: 3,000
Referee: Francisc Coloşi (Romania)

Bayern Munich won 5–2 on aggregate.

7 November 1979

Perugia (Italy)	0–3	(Greece) Aris Thessaloniki
	Report	Ballis 7'; Semertzidis 17'; Zindros 62'

Stadio Renato Curi, Perugia
Attendance: 24,971
Referee: Vojtech Christov (Czechoslovakia)

Aris Thessaloniki won 4–1 on aggregate.

7 November 1979

Inter Milan (Italy)	2–3 (a.e.t.)	(West Germany) Borussia Mönchengladbach
Altobelli 24', 93'	Report	Nickel 33', 108' (pen.); Ringels 103'

San Siro, Milan
Attendance: 81,000
Referee: Károly Palotai (Hungary)

Borussia Mönchengladbach won 4–3 on aggregate.

7 November 1979

Eintracht Frankfurt (West Germany)	3–0 (a.e.t.)	(Romania) Dinamo București
Cha 73'; Hölzenbein 90+1'; Nickel 94'	Report

Waldstadion, Frankfurt
Attendance: 21,000
Referee: Erik Fredriksson (Sweden)

Eintracht Frankfurt won 3–2 on aggregate.

7 November 1979

Diósgyőri VTK (Hungary)	3–1	(Scotland) Dundee United
Borostyán 8'; Tatár 43' (pen.), 68'	Report	Kopel 80'

Diósgyőri Stadion, Miskolc
Attendance: 20,000
Referee: Alain Delmer (France)

Diósgyöri VTK won 4–1 on aggregate.

7 November 1979

Stuttgart (West Germany)	0–0	(East Germany) Dynamo Dresden
	Report

Neckarstadion, Stuttgart
Attendance: 71,000
Referee: Pat Partridge (England)

1–1 on aggregate; Stuttgart won on away goals.

7 November 1979
17:00

Dynamo Kyiv (Soviet Union)	2–0	(Czechoslovakia) Baník Ostrava
Demyanenko 59'; Khapsalis 77'	Report

Dynamo Stadium, Kyiv
Attendance: 6,000
Referee: Talat Tokat (Turkey)

Dynamo Kyiv won 2–1 on aggregate.

7 November 1979

Leeds United (England)	0–2	(Romania) Universitatea Craiova
	Report	Cârțu 68'; Beldeanu 84'

Elland Road, Leeds
Attendance: 14,438
Referee: Antonín Vencl (Czechoslovakia)

Universitatea Craiova won 4–0 on aggregate.

7 November 1979

Malmö FF (Sweden)	1–1	(Netherlands) Feyenoord
Arvidsson 88'	Report	Pétursson 82'

Malmö IP, Malmö
Attendance: 5,790
Referee: Myroslav Stupar (Soviet Union)

Feyenoord won 5–1 on aggregate.

7 November 1979

Ipswich Town (England)	1–1	(Switzerland) Grasshoppers
Beattie 43'	Report	Sulser 69'

Portman Road, Ipswich
Attendance: 19,574
Referee: Klaus Scheurell (East Germany)

1–1 on aggregate; Grasshoppers won on away goals.

7 November 1979

Monaco (France)	2–1	(Bulgaria) Lokomotiv Sofia
Christophe 2'; Onnis 39'	Report	Mihaylov 77'

Stade Louis II, Monaco
Attendance: 9,434
Referee: António Garrido (Portugal)

Lokomotiv Sofia won 5–4 on aggregate.

7 November 1979

Saint-Étienne (France)	6–0	(Netherlands) PSV Eindhoven
Larios 3'; Platini 4', 59'; Santini 5'; Roussey 88'; Rep 90' (pen.)	Report

Stade Geoffroy-Guichard, Saint-Étienne
Attendance: 38,000
Referee: Alberto Michelotti (Italy)

Saint-Étienne won 6–2 on aggregate.

7 November 1979

Carl Zeiss Jena (East Germany)	2–3	(Socialist Federal Republic of Yugoslavia) Red Star Belgrade
Trocha 42'; Töpfer 82'	Report	Kurbjuweit 63' (o.g.); Filipović 65'; Blagojević 76'

Ernst-Abbe-Sportfeld, Jena
Attendance: 16,000
Referee: George Courtney (England)

Red Star Belgrade won 6–4 on aggregate.

7 November 1979

Kaiserslautern (West Germany)	2–0	(Portugal) Sporting CP
Bongartz 26'; Neues 63' (pen.)	Report

Fritz-Walter-Stadion, Kaiserslautern
Attendance: 29,739
Referee: Hilmi Ok (Turkey)

Kaiserslautern won 3–1 on aggregate.

7 November 1979

Napoli (Italy)	1–1	(Belgium) Standard Liège
Damiani 77'	Report	Riedl 40'

Stadio San Paolo, Naples
Attendance: 53,000
Referee: Adolf Prokop (East Germany)

Standard Liège won 3–2 on aggregate.

== Third round ==
Team 1	Agg.	Team 2	1st leg	2nd leg
Saint-Étienne (France)	7–4	(Greece) Aris Thessaloniki	4–1	3–3
Bayern Munich (West Germany)	4–3	(Socialist Federal Republic of Yugoslavia) Red Star Belgrade	2–0	2–3
Borussia Mönchengladbach (West Germany)	2–1	(Romania) Universitatea Craiova	2–0	0–1
Diósgyőri VTK (Hungary)	1–8	(West Germany) Kaiserslautern	0–2	1–6
Eintracht Frankfurt (West Germany)	4–2	(Netherlands) Feyenoord	4–1	0–1
Grasshoppers (Switzerland)	0–5	(West Germany) Stuttgart	0–2	0–3
Lokomotiv Sofia (Bulgaria)	2–2 (a)	(Soviet Union) Dynamo Kyiv	1–0	1–2
Standard Liège (Belgium)	3–5	(Czechoslovakia) Zbrojovka Brno	1–2	2–3

=== First leg ===
28 November 1979

Saint-Étienne (France)	4–1	(Greece) Aris Thessaloniki
Platini 14' (pen.); Larios 46'; Lopez 54'; Roussey 77'	Report	Semertzidis 34'

Stade Geoffroy-Guichard, Saint-Étienne
Attendance: 38,722
Referee: Walter Eschweiler (West Germany)

28 November 1979

Bayern Munich (West Germany)	2–0	(Socialist Federal Republic of Yugoslavia) Red Star Belgrade
Rummenigge 51'; Janzon 69'	Report

Olympiastadion, Munich
Attendance: 39,000
Referee: Paolo Casarin (Italy)

28 November 1979

Borussia Mönchengladbach (West Germany)	2–0	(Romania) Universitatea Craiova
Nickel 10', 79'	Report

Bökelbergstadion, Mönchengladbach
Attendance: 22,000
Referee: David Syme (Scotland)

28 November 1979

Diósgyőri VTK (Hungary)	0–2	(West Germany) Kaiserslautern
	Report	Riedl 13'; Bongartz 55'

Diósgyőri Stadion, Miskolc
Attendance: 13,000
Referee: Emmanuel Platopoulos (Greece)

28 November 1979

Eintracht Frankfurt (West Germany)	4–1	(Netherlands) Feyenoord
Cha 20'; Nickel 30'; Müller 56'; Lottermann 60'	Report	Stafleu 85'

Waldstadion, Frankfurt
Attendance: 40,000
Referee: John Hunting (England)

28 November 1979

Grasshoppers (Switzerland)	0–2	(West Germany) Stuttgart
	Report	Klotz 14'; Hadewicz 79'

Hardturm, Zürich
Attendance: 29,450
Referee: Vojtech Christov (Czechoslovakia)

28 November 1979
18:00

Lokomotiv Sofia (Bulgaria)	1–0	(Soviet Union) Dynamo Kyiv
Mihaylov 38'	Report

Vasil Levski National Stadium, Sofia
Attendance: 8,000
Referee: Adolf Prokop (East Germany)

28 November 1979

Standard Liège (Belgium)	1–2	(Czechoslovakia) Zbrojovka Brno
Voordeckers 6'	Report	Svoboda 60'; Došek 85'

Stade Maurice Dufrasne, Liège
Attendance: 27,500
Referee: Bruno Galler (Switzerland)

=== Second leg ===
12 December 1979

Aris Thessaloniki (Greece)	3–3	(France) Saint-Étienne
Zindros 20'; Pallas 85' (pen.); Janvion 88' (o.g.)	Report	Larios 7'; Zimako 65'; Rep 78'

Kleanthis Vikelidis Stadium, Thessaloniki
Attendance: 26,153
Referee: Erich Linemayr (Austria)

Saint-Étienne won 7–4 on aggregate.

12 December 1979

Red Star Belgrade (Socialist Federal Republic of Yugoslavia)	3–2	(West Germany) Bayern Munich
Savić 3'; Petrović 41'; Repčić 49'	Report	Hoeneß 65', 68'

Red Star Stadium, Belgrade
Attendance: 86,185
Referee: Hilmi Ok (Turkey)

Bayern Munich won 4–3 on aggregate.

12 December 1979

Universitatea Craiova (Romania)	1–0	(West Germany) Borussia Mönchengladbach
Irimescu 75'	Report

Stadionul Central, Craiova
Attendance: 42,000
Referee: Marcel Van Langenhove (Belgium)

Borussia Mönchengladbach won 2–1 on aggregate.

12 December 1979

Kaiserslautern (West Germany)	6–1	(Hungary) Diósgyőri VTK
Neues 47' (pen.); Melzer 52'; Brummer 62'; Kaminke 66'; Bongartz 78'; Stabel 90' (pen.)	Report	Borostyán 54'

Fritz-Walter-Stadion, Kaiserslautern
Attendance: 17,000
Referee: Emilio Guruceta Muro (Spain)

Kaiserslautern won 8–1 on aggregate.

12 December 1979

Feyenoord (Netherlands)	1–0	(West Germany) Eintracht Frankfurt
Peters 89'	Report

De Kuip, Rotterdam
Attendance: 52,241
Referee: Michel Vautrot (France)

Eintracht Frankfurt won 4–2 on aggregate.

12 December 1979

Stuttgart (West Germany)	3–0	(Switzerland) Grasshoppers
Müller 4'; Martin 35'; Kelsch 59'	Report

Neckarstadion, Stuttgart
Attendance: 58,000
Referee: Jan Beck (Netherlands)

Stuttgart won 5–0 on aggregate.

12 December 1979
18:00

Dynamo Kyiv (Soviet Union)	2–1	(Bulgaria) Lokomotiv Sofia
Blokhin 41'; Khapsalis 43'	Report	Doichev 72'

Dynamo Stadium, Kyiv
Attendance: 18,000
Referee: Károly Palotai (Hungary)

2–2 on aggregate; Lokomotiv Sofia won on away goals.

12 December 1979

Zbrojovka Brno (Czechoslovakia)	3–2	(Belgium) Standard Liège
Jarůšek 44'; Kroupa 65'; Janečka 69'	Report	Edström 18'; Norton de Matos 54'

Městský fotbalový stadion Srbská, Brno
Attendance: 24,853
Referee: Ron Bridges (Wales)

Zbrojovka Brno won 5–3 on aggregate.

== Quarter-finals ==
Team 1	Agg.	Team 2	1st leg	2nd leg
Kaiserslautern (West Germany)	2–4	(West Germany) Bayern Munich	1–0	1–4
Saint-Étienne (France)	1–6	(West Germany) Borussia Mönchengladbach	1–4	0–2
Eintracht Frankfurt (West Germany)	6–4	(Czechoslovakia) Zbrojovka Brno	4–1	2–3
Stuttgart (West Germany)	4–1	(Bulgaria) Lokomotiv Sofia	3–1	1–0

=== First leg ===
5 March 1980

Kaiserslautern (West Germany)	1–0	(West Germany) Bayern Munich
Brummer 57'	Report

Betzenberg, Kaiserslautern
Attendance: 33,500
Referee: Dušan Krchňák (Czechoslovakia)

5 March 1980

Saint-Étienne (France)	1–4	(West Germany) Borussia Mönchengladbach
Platini 55' (pen.)	Report	Nielsen 15', 21'; Nickel 18'; Lienen 36'

Stade Geoffroy-Guichard, Saint-Étienne
Attendance: 39,217
Referee: Augusto Lamo Castillo (Spain)

5 March 1980

Eintracht Frankfurt (West Germany)	4–1	(Czechoslovakia) Zbrojovka Brno
Nachtweih 13'; Lorant 44' (pen.); Nickel 51'; Karger 72'	Report	Horný 31'

Waldstadion, Frankfurt
Attendance: 25,376
Referee: Eamonn Farrell (Republic of Ireland)

5 March 1980

Stuttgart (West Germany)	3–1	(Bulgaria) Lokomotiv Sofia
Müller 30'; Volkert 35' (pen.), 76'	Report	Kolev 29'

Neckarstadion, Stuttgart
Attendance: 38,000
Referee: Marijan Rauš (Yugoslavia)

=== Second leg ===
19 March 1980

Bayern Munich (West Germany)	4–1	(West Germany) Kaiserslautern
Hoeneß 35', 82'; Janzon 60'; Breitner 73' (pen.)	Report	Wendt 13'

Olympiastadion, Munich
Attendance: 30,000
Referee: Nikola Dudin (Bulgaria)

Bayern Munich won 4–2 on aggregate.

19 March 1980

Borussia Mönchengladbach (West Germany)	2–0	(France) Saint-Étienne
Thychosen 11'; Hannes 15'	Report

Bökelbergstadion, Mönchengladbach
Attendance: 20,000
Referee: Nicolae Rainea (Romania)

Borussia Mönchengladbach won 6–1 on aggregate.

19 March 1980

Zbrojovka Brno (Czechoslovakia)	3–2	(West Germany) Eintracht Frankfurt
Horný 10'; Kotásek 89'; Kopenec 90'	Report	Karger 18'; Neuberger 77'

Městský fotbalový stadion Srbská, Brno
Attendance: 45,000
Referee: Ole Amundsen (Denmark)

Eintracht Frankfurt won 6–4 on aggregate.

19 March 1980

Lokomotiv Sofia (Bulgaria)	0–1	(West Germany) Stuttgart
	Report	Ohlicher 7'

Vasil Levski National Stadium, Sofia
Attendance: 15,000
Referee: Clive Thomas (Wales)

Stuttgart won 4–1 on aggregate.

== Semi-finals ==
Team 1	Agg.	Team 2	1st leg	2nd leg
Bayern Munich (West Germany)	3–5	(West Germany) Eintracht Frankfurt	2–0	1–5 (a.e.t.)
Stuttgart (West Germany)	2–3	(West Germany) Borussia Mönchengladbach	2–1	0–2

=== First leg ===
9 April 1980

Bayern Munich (West Germany)	2–0	(West Germany) Eintracht Frankfurt
D. Hoeneß 50'; Breitner 76' (pen.)	Report

Olympiastadion, Munich
Attendance: 14,000
Referee: László Pádár (Hungary)

9 April 1980

Stuttgart (Germany)	2–1	(Germany) Borussia Mönchengladbach
Ohlicher 85'; Volkert 89' (pen.)	Report	Nickel 73'

Neckarstadion, Stuttgart
Attendance: 42,000
Referee: George Courtney (England)

=== Second leg ===
22 April 1980

Eintracht Frankfurt (West Germany)	5–1 (a.e.t.)	(Germany) Bayern Munich
Pezzey 31', 87'; Karger 103', 107'; Lorant 118' (pen.)	Report	Dremmler 105'

Waldstadion, Frankfurt
Attendance: 48,500
Referee: Brian McGinlay (Scotland)

Eintracht Frankfurt won 5–3 on aggregate.

22 April 1980

Borussia Mönchengladbach (West Germany)	2–0	(Germany) Stuttgart
Matthäus 23'; Schäfer 68'	Report

Bökelbergstadion, Mönchengladbach
Attendance: 22,000
Referee: Erik Fredriksson (Sweden)

Borussia Mönchengladbach won 3–2 on aggregate.

== Final ==
=== First leg ===
7 May 1980

Borussia Mönchengladbach (West Germany)	3–2	(West Germany) Eintracht Frankfurt
Kulik 45', 88'; Matthäus 77'	Report	Karger 37'; Hölzenbein 71'

Bökelbergstadion, Mönchengladbach
Attendance: 25,000
Referee: Emilio Guruceta Muro (Spain)

=== Second leg ===
21 May 1980

Eintracht Frankfurt (West Germany)	1–0	(West Germany) Borussia Mönchengladbach
Schaub 81'	Report

Waldstadion, Frankfurt
Attendance: 59,000
Referee: Alexis Ponnet (Belgium)

3–3 on aggregate; Eintracht Frankfurt won on away goals.
