= Zdeněk Nehoda =

Czech footballer

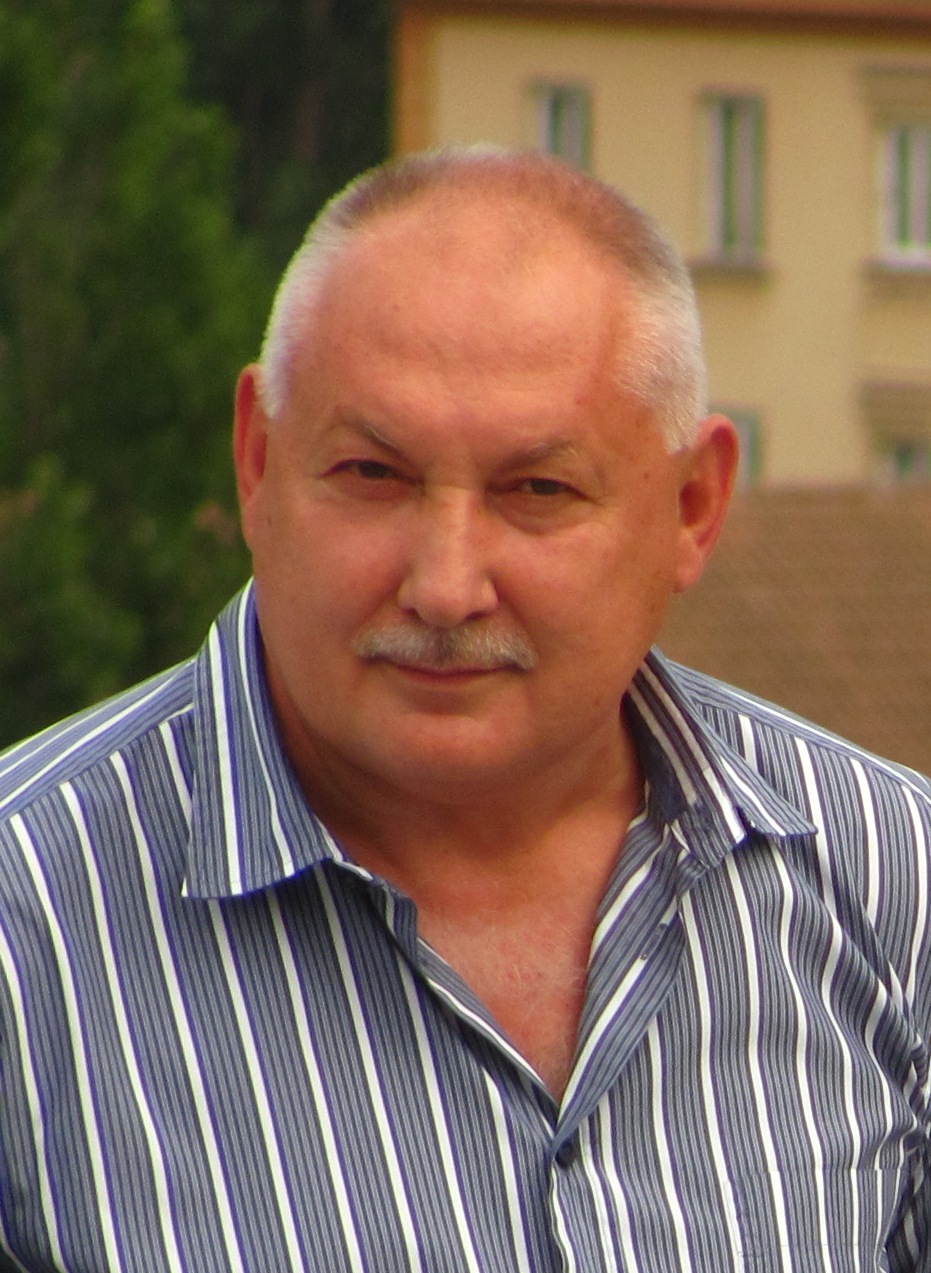
- Nehoda in 2012

Personal information
- Date of birth: 9 May 1952 (age 74)
- Place of birth: Hulín, Czechoslovakia
- Height: 1.81 m (5 ft 11 in)
- Position: Forward

Youth career
- 1962–1967: Spartak Hulín
- 1967–1969: TJ Gottwaldov

Senior career*
| Years | Team | Apps | (Gls) |
| 1969–1971 | TJ Gottwaldov | 56 | (21) |
| 1971–1983 | Dukla Prague | 290 | (124) |
| 1983 | SV Darmstadt 98 | 32 | (14) |
| 1984 | Standard Liège | 3 | (0) |
| 1984–1986 | FC Grenoble | 60 | (24) |
| 1986–1989 | SC Amaliendorf | 55 | (33) |
| Total | | 496 | (216) |

International career
| 1971–1987 | Czechoslovakia | 91 | (31) |
Medal record
Representing Czechoslovakia
UEFA European Championship
| Winner | 1976 Yugoslavia |
- * Club domestic league appearances and goals

Zdeněk Nehoda (born 9 May 1952) is a Czech former footballer who played as a forward.

== International career ==
At international level, Nehoda played for Czechoslovakia, making 91 appearances and scoring 31 goals, usually as a right winger. He was a participant in the 1982 FIFA World Cup. He won a gold medal in the UEFA Euro 1976 and a bronze medal in the UEFA Euro 1980.

== Agent career ==
Nehoda is currently an agent, representing a number of Czech and foreign players.

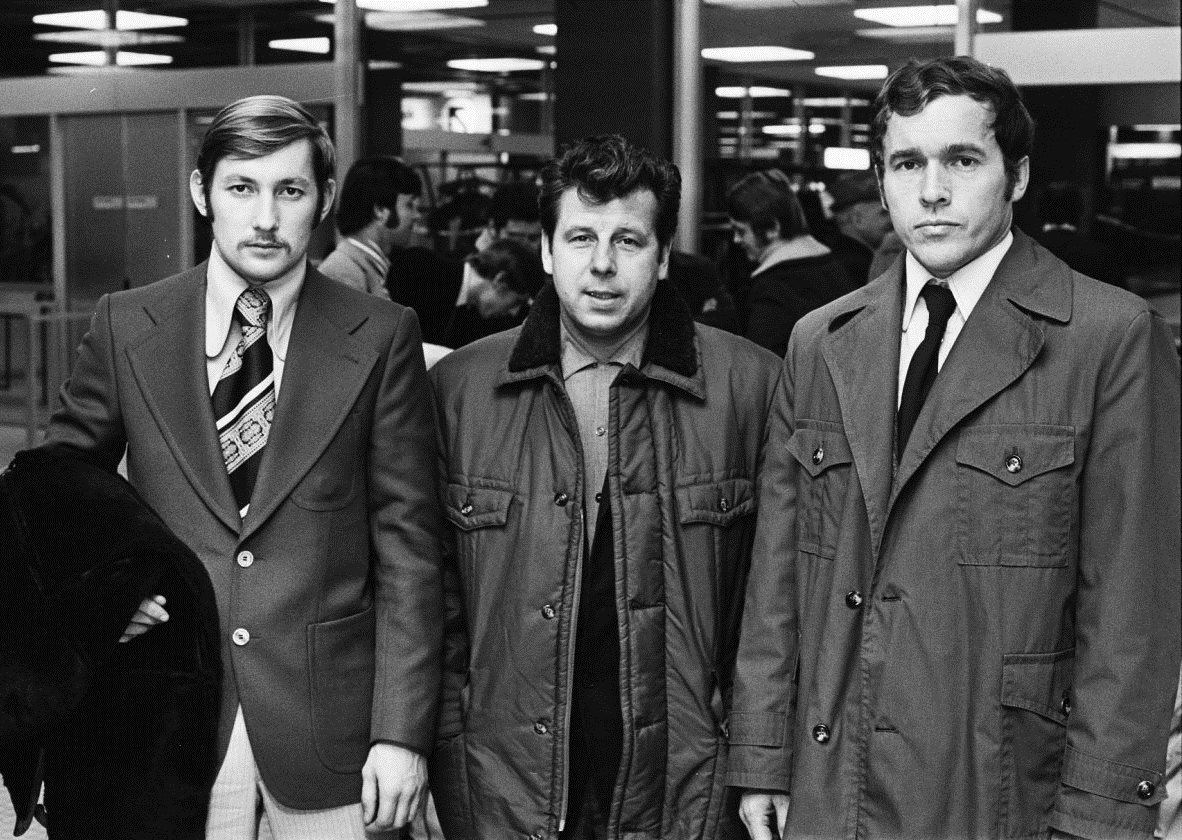
Zdeněk Nehoda (left) with Josef Masopust and Ivo Viktor in 1974

== Honours ==
TJ Gottwaldov

- Czechoslovak Cup: 1969–70

Dukla Prague

- Czechoslovak First League: 1976–77, 1978–79, 1981–82
- Czechoslovak Cup: 1980–81, 1982–83

Czechoslovakia

- European Football Championship: 1976

Individual

- Czechoslovak Footballer of the Year: 1978, 1979
- UEFA European Championship Team of the Tournament: 1976
