= 1978–79 Czechoslovak First League =

Czechoslovak First League
- Season: 1978–79
- Champions: Dukla Prague
- Relegated: Tatran Prešov; Sklo Union Teplice
- European Cup: Dukla Prague
- Cup Winners' Cup: Lokomotíva Košice
- UEFA Cup: Baník Ostrava; Zbrojovka Brno; Bohemians Prague
- Top goalscorer: Karel Kroupa; Zdeněk Nehoda (17 goals each)

Statistics of Czechoslovak First League in the 1978–79 season.

== Overview ==
It was contested by 16 teams, and Dukla Prague won the championship. Karel Kroupa and Zdeněk Nehoda were the league's top scorers with 17 goals each.

== Stadia and locations ==
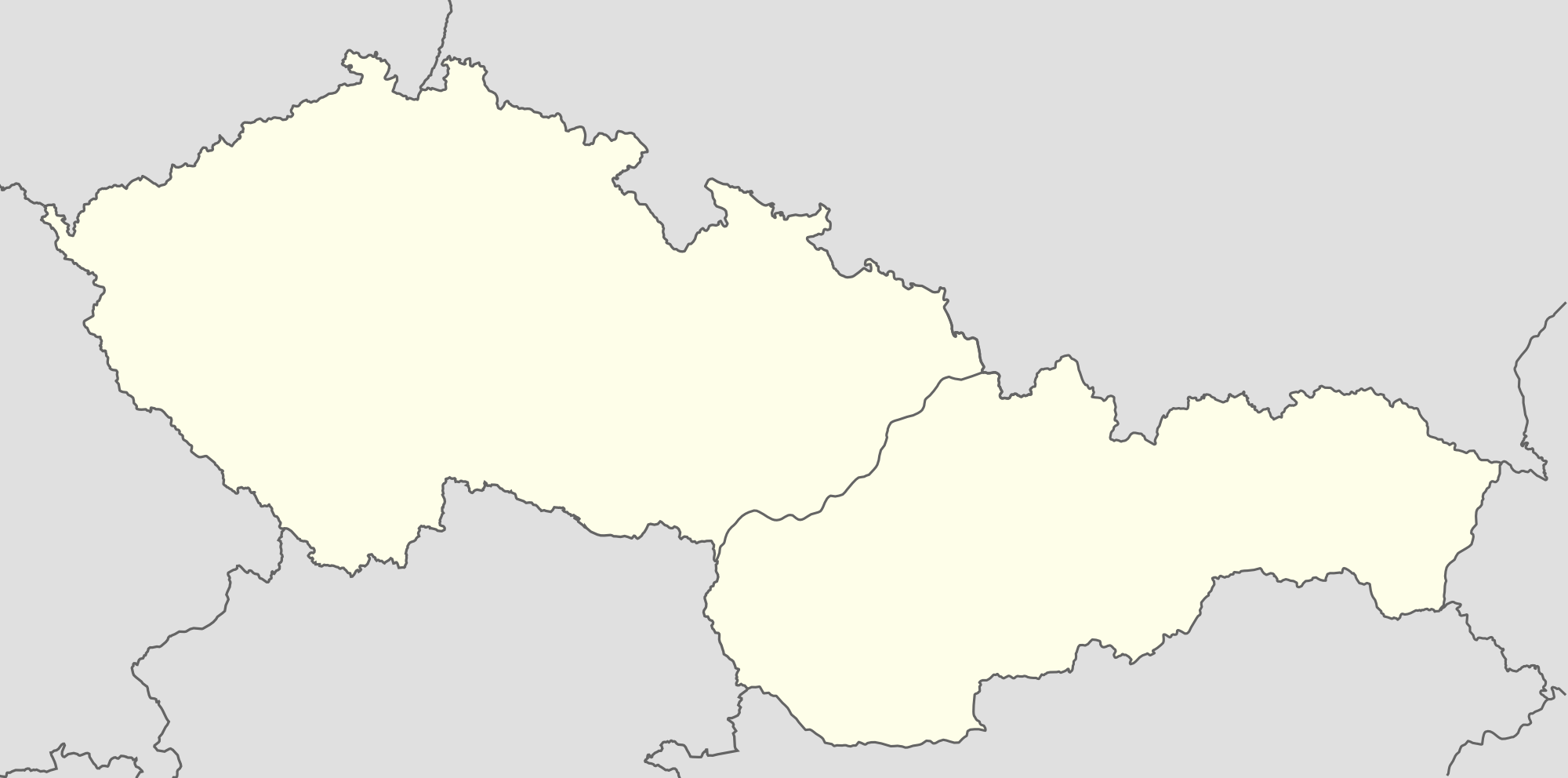
Location of clubs in the 1978–79 Czechoslovak First League

== League standings ==
Pos	Team	Pld	W	D	L	GF	GA	GD	Pts	Qualification or relegation
1	Dukla Prague (C)	30	18	5	7	65	24	+41	41	Qualification for European Cup first round
2	Baník Ostrava	30	16	9	5	44	22	+22	41	Qualification for UEFA Cup first round
3	Zbrojovka Brno	30	13	9	8	55	32	+23	35	Qualification for UEFA Cup first round
4	Bohemians Prague	30	12	8	10	44	41	+3	32	Qualification for UEFA Cup first round
5	Sparta Prague	30	12	7	11	43	37	+6	31	
6	Inter Bratislava	30	11	8	11	40	34	+6	30	
7	Slavia Prague	30	12	5	13	40	45	−5	29	
8	Dukla Banská Bystrica	30	10	9	11	42	49	−7	29	
9	Košice	30	12	5	13	42	58	−16	29	
10	Slovan Bratislava	30	8	12	10	35	32	+3	28	
11	Lokomotíva Košice	30	11	6	13	47	48	−1	28	Qualification for Cup Winners' Cup first round
12	Spartak Trnava	30	7	13	10	34	37	−3	27	
13	Jednota Trenčín	30	10	6	14	38	45	−7	26	
14	Škoda Plzeň	30	9	8	13	27	47	−20	26	
15	Tatran Prešov (R)	30	7	11	12	24	51	−27	25	Relegation to Slovak National Football League
16	Sklo Union Teplice (R)	30	8	7	15	30	48	−18	23	Relegation to Czech National Football League

Source: rsssf.com
(C) Champions; (R) Relegated

== Results ==
Home \ Away	OST	BOH	BB	DUK	INT	TRE	KOŠ	LOK	TEP	PLZ	SLA	SLO	SPA	TRN	PRE	BRN
Baník Ostrava		2–1	4–0	0–1	3–0	1–0	1–0	3–1	3–0	0–0	3–1	1–1	2–0	2–2	4–0	2–0
Bohemians Prague	0–1		2–2	2–0	2–1	2–1	2–0	2–0	3–1	1–1	1–0	1–0	2–1	1–1	2–0	2–1
Dukla Banská Bystrica	1–1	0–3		2–1	1–1	2–1	2–0	1–1	1–0	3–0	1–1	3–0	2–0	2–1	3–0	3–4
Dukla Prague	1–0	3–1	0–0		3–1	4–0	8–0	5–0	5–0	4–2	4–1	2–0	3–0	4–2	3–0	0–0
Inter Bratislava	0–2	1–1	4–0	2–0		5–1	2–0	2–1	1–3	5–0	1–0	1–0	1–0	1–1	1–1	1–0
Jednota Trenčín	1–1	1–1	1–1	0–1	2–1		2–0	3–1	4–0	3–0	2–0	1–4	1–2	1–0	4–0	1–1
Košice	1–2	3–2	4–2	0–3	3–1	1–1		2–1	1–0	2–1	1–0	3–2	1–1	3–3	3–1	2–1
Lokomotiva Košice	4–1	3–2	3–1	0–0	1–0	3–1	2–4		4–1	1–1	6–0	2–2	1–0	1–0	3–0	0–2
Sklo Union Teplice	0–0	2–0	3–2	0–3	0–0	1–3	1–2	1–0		1–0	2–2	2–0	1–2	0–0	4–0	4–2
Škoda Plzeň	0–2	3–2	1–0	2–0	2–1	2–1	1–0	3–1	1–0		1–1	0–0	0–0	2–1	1–1	1–3
Slavia Prague	0–1	1–0	4–1	2–4	1–1	1–0	4–2	3–1	2–0	2–0		1–0	2–1	2–2	5–1	2–0
Slovan Bratislava	0–0	3–1	0–0	1–1	0–2	0–0	1–1	3–2	0–0	3–1	4–1		2–0	3–0	0–0	4–2
Sparta Prague	3–1	2–2	3–5	2–1	4–2	3–0	3–1	0–0	2–0	2–0	1–0	1–1		2–1	6–1	0–1
Spartak Trnava	3–0	1–1	1–1	0–0	1–0	2–0	1–1	1–2	3–1	2–0	0–1	1–0	1–1		0–0	1–0
Tatran Prešov	0–0	2–2	2–0	2–1	1–1	1–2	1–0	2–0	1–1	1–1	2–0	1–0	1–0	1–1		1–3
FC Zbrojovka Brno	1–1	4–0	3–0	2–0	0–0	4–0	6–1	2–2	1–1	4–0	2–0	1–1	1–1	4–1	0–0	

Source: statistiky1ligy.fotbal.cz
Legend: Blue = home team win; Yellow = draw; Red = away team win.

== Attendances ==
#	Club	Average	Highest
1	Brno	11,390	19,131
2	Sparta Praha	9,729	20,537
3	Slavia Praha	7,836	22,643
4	Bohemians	7,135	13,969
5	Spartak Trnava	6,125	9,386
6	Ostrava	5,724	12,236
7	Slovan	5,258	10,387
8	Lokomotíva Košice	5,042	8,684
9	Dukla Banská Bystrica	4,470	15,536
10	Teplice	4,240	7,062
11	Tatran Prešov	3,818	7,282
12	Trenčín	3,606	5,462
13	Plzeň	3,504	9,479
14	ZŤS	3,447	6,433
15	Inter Bratislava	3,149	7,382
16	Dukla Praha	3,123	8,645
