= Petr Janečka =

Czechoslovak footballer

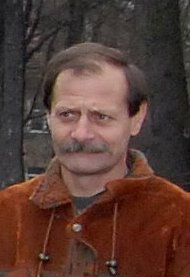

Personal information
- Date of birth: 25 November 1957 (age 68)
- Place of birth: Gottwaldov, Czechoslovakia
- Height: 1.78 m (5 ft 10 in)
- Position: Striker

Senior career*
Years	Team	Apps	(Gls)
1977–1983	Zbrojovka Brno	146	(63)
1983–1988	Bohemians Prague	104	(42)
1987–1988	RC Jet de Bruxelles	20	(4)
Total		270	(109)

International career
1978–1987	Czechoslovakia	39	(9)
- * Club domestic league appearances and goals

Petr Janečka (born 25 November 1957 in Gottwaldov) is a former Czechoslovak footballer.

He played 39 matches for the Czechoslovakia national team and participated in the 1982 FIFA World Cup. In 1978, he won the Czechoslovak First League with Zbrojovka Brno.

== Career ==
He started in 1967 in TJ Gottwaldov, where he played till 1977. Then he went from 3rd league club to 1st league club Zbrojovka Brno when he was 19. In 1st season in Brno, he won the Czechoslovak First League in 1978.

He missed Euro 1980 in Italy (3rd place) and Moscow 1980 Olympic Games (1st place) due to peptic ulcer disease. He participated in the 1982 FIFA World Cup in Spain, but he did not score, although he played all 3 matches.

Only 5 years after the title, Zbrojovka Brno was relegated in 1983. Janečka, as a national team member, went to Bohemians Prague (which had won its only league title in 1983) to avoid playing in 2nd league.

In 1987, after Bohemians Prague played with Belgian club KSK Beveren in 1987-88 UEFA Cup 1st round, Janečka went to another Belgian club, RC Jet de Bruxelles.

1989, he was back in TJ Gottwaldov in 2nd league.
