= Křelov-Břuchotín =

- Municipality
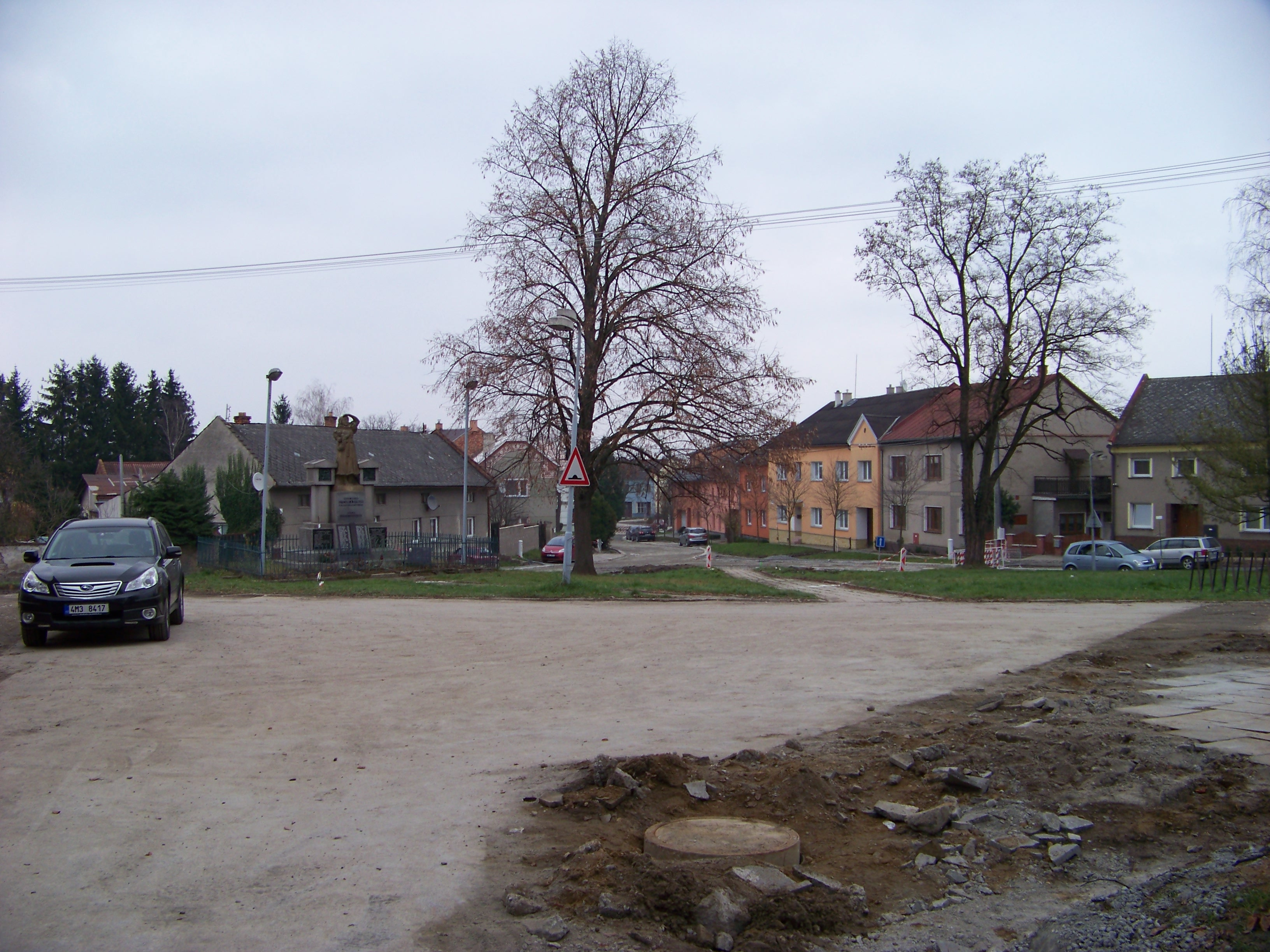
- Lipové Square in Křelov

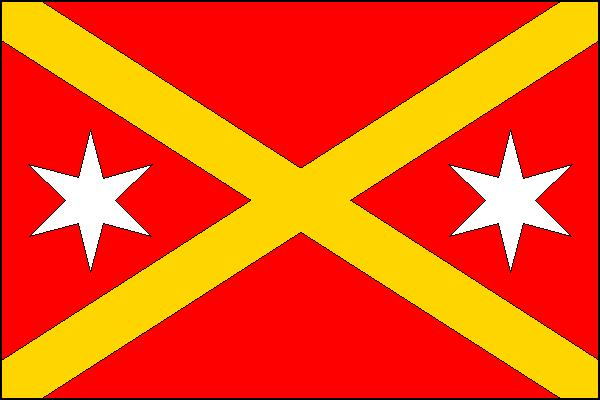
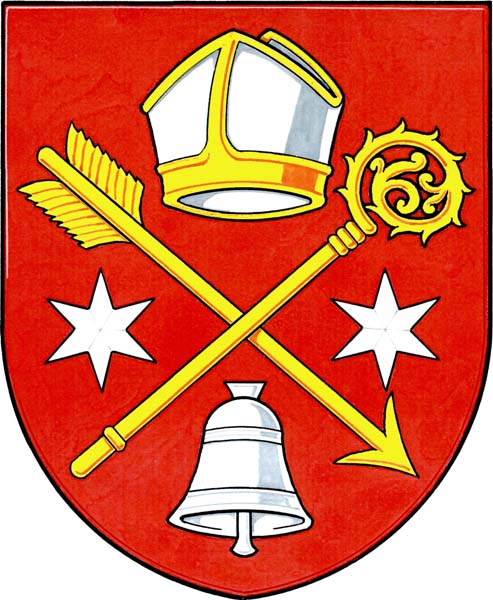
- Flag Coat of arms

- Location in the Czech Republic
- Coordinates: 49°36′53″N 17°11′58″E
- Country: Czech Republic
- Region: Olomouc
- District: Olomouc
- First mentioned: 1275

Area
  - Total: 7.91 km^{2} (3.05 sq mi)
- Elevation: 255 m (837 ft)

Population (2026-01-01)
  - Total: 1,996
  - Density: 252/km^{2} (654/sq mi)
- Time zone: UTC+1 (CET)
  - Summer (DST): UTC+2 (CEST)
- Postal code: 783 36
- Website: www.krelov.cz

Křelov-Břuchotín is a municipality in Olomouc District in the Olomouc Region of the Czech Republic. It has about 2,000 inhabitants.

== Administrative division ==
Křelov-Břuchotín consists of two municipal parts (in brackets population according to the 2021 census):

- Křelov (1,516)
- Břuchotín (240)

== Geography ==
Křelov-Břuchotín is located about 3 kilometres (2 mi) northwest of Olomouc. It lies in a flat landscape in the Upper Morava Valley. The highest point is the flat hill Dílový vrch at 283 m (928 ft) above sea level. The eastern tip of the municipal territory extends into the Litovelské Pomoraví Protected Landscape Area.

== History ==
The first written mention of Křelov is from 1275 and the first mention of Břuchotín is from 1278. The two municipalities were merged in 1960 under the name Křelov. In 1975, Křelov and Břuchotín were joined to Olomouc. In 1995, it became a separate municipality under its current name.

== Demographics ==
Historical population

Year	Pop.	±%
1869	885	—
1880	1,040	+17.5%
1890	1,193	+14.7%
1900	1,345	+12.7%
1910	1,497	+11.3%

Year	Pop.	±%
1921	1,545	+3.2%
1930	1,814	+17.4%
1950	1,469	−19.0%
1961	1,440	−2.0%
1970	1,297	−9.9%

Year	Pop.	±%
1980	1,276	−1.6%
1991	1,207	−5.4%
2001	1,314	+8.9%
2011	1,569	+19.4%
2021	1,756	+11.9%

Source: Censuses

== Transport ==
The D35 motorway from Olomouc to the Hradec Králové Region runs through the municipality.

== Sights ==
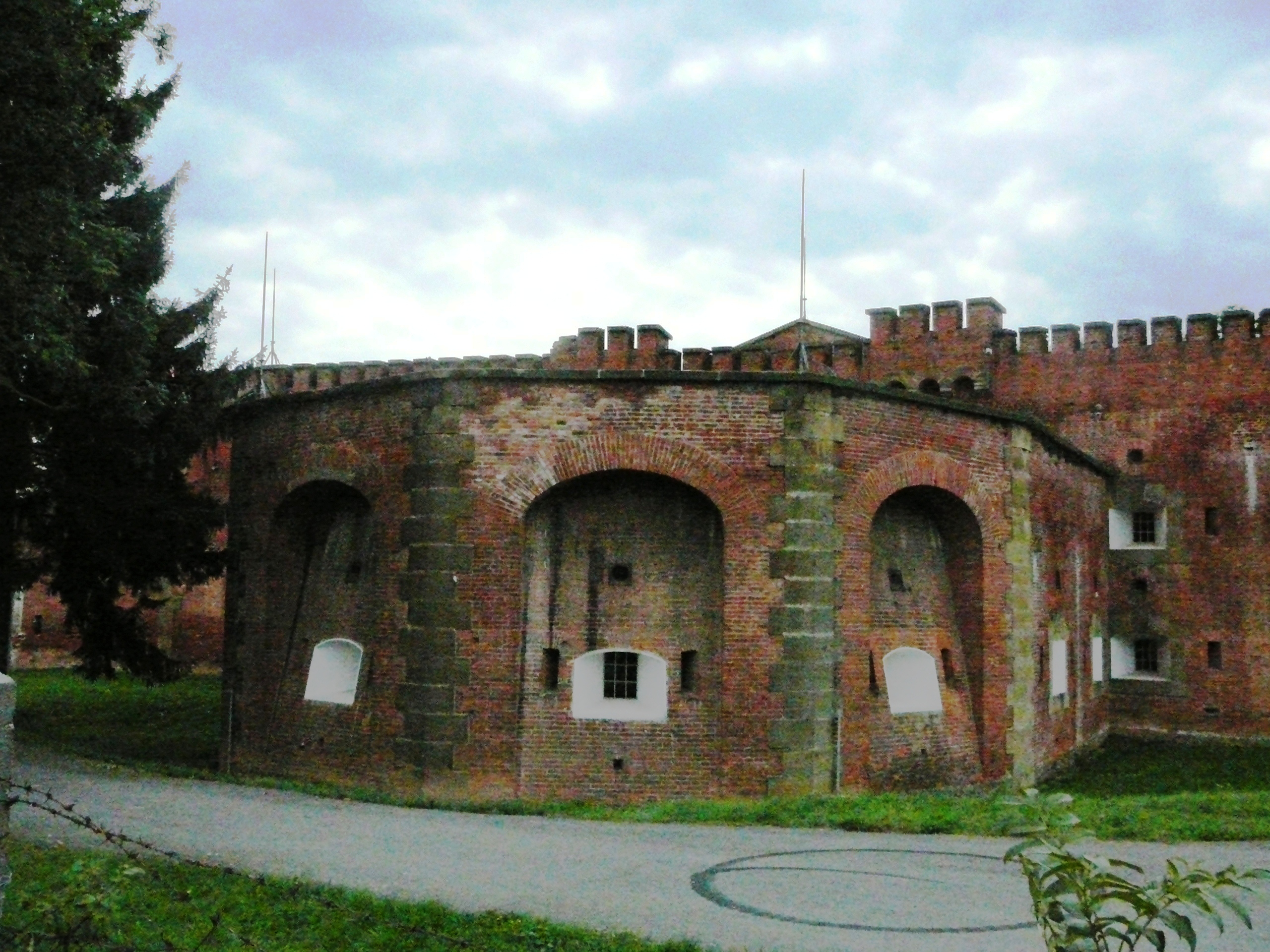
Fort XVII Křelov

Historical monuments are Fort XVII Křelov (built in 1850–1854) and Fort XX Křelov (built in 1854–1858). They were built as part of the advanced fortification around the city walls of Olomouc. Fort XVII Křelov house a small museum, a restaurant and spaces for organising cultural events.

== Notable people ==
- Ivo Viktor (born 1942), footballer
