= Czechoslovak Footballer of the Year =

Association football award in Czechoslovakia

The Czechoslovak Player of the Year (Czech: Fotbalista roku, Slovak: Futbalista roka) award was an annual prize given to the best Czechoslovak football player by the Czechoslovak Football Association since 1965. Award for coach of the year was also awarded since 1985.

== Winners ==
Year	Footballer of the Year	Coach of the Year
1965	Ján Popluhár (Slovan Bratislava)	
1966	Josef Masopust (Dukla Prague)	
1967	Ján Geleta (Dukla Prague)	
1968	Ivo Viktor (Dukla Prague)	
1969	Ladislav Kuna (Spartak Trnava)	
1970	Karol Dobiáš (Spartak Trnava)	
1971	Karol Dobiáš (Spartak Trnava)	
1972	Ivo Viktor (Dukla Prague)	
1973	Ivo Viktor (Dukla Prague)	
1974	Ján Pivarník (Slovan Bratislava)	
1975	Ivo Viktor (Dukla Prague)	
1976	Ivo Viktor (Dukla Prague)	
1977	Karel Kroupa (Zbrojovka Brno)	
1978	Zdeněk Nehoda (Dukla Prague)	
1979	Zdeněk Nehoda (Dukla Prague)	
1980	Antonín Panenka (Bohemians Prague)	
1981	Ján Kozák (Dukla Prague)	
1982	Jan Fiala (Dukla Prague)	
1983	Ladislav Vízek (Dukla Prague)	
1984	Jan Berger (Sparta Prague)	
1985	Ladislav Vízek (Dukla Prague)	Karel Brückner (SK Sigma Olomouc)
1986	Jozef Chovanec (Sparta Prague)	Ivan Kopecký (TJ Vítkovice)
1987	Ivan Hašek (Sparta Prague)	Václav Ježek (Sparta Prague)
1988	Ivan Hašek (Sparta Prague)	Václav Ježek (Sparta Prague)
1989	Michal Bílek (Sparta Prague)	Milan Máčala (Baník Ostrava)
1990	Ján Kocian (FC St. Pauli)	Milan Máčala (Baník Ostrava)
1991	Tomáš Skuhravý (Genoa C.F.C.)	Dušan Uhrin (Sparta Prague)
1992	Ľubomír Moravčík (AS Saint-Étienne)	Dušan Uhrin (Sparta Prague)
