= Jan Fiala =

Czech footballer (born 1956)

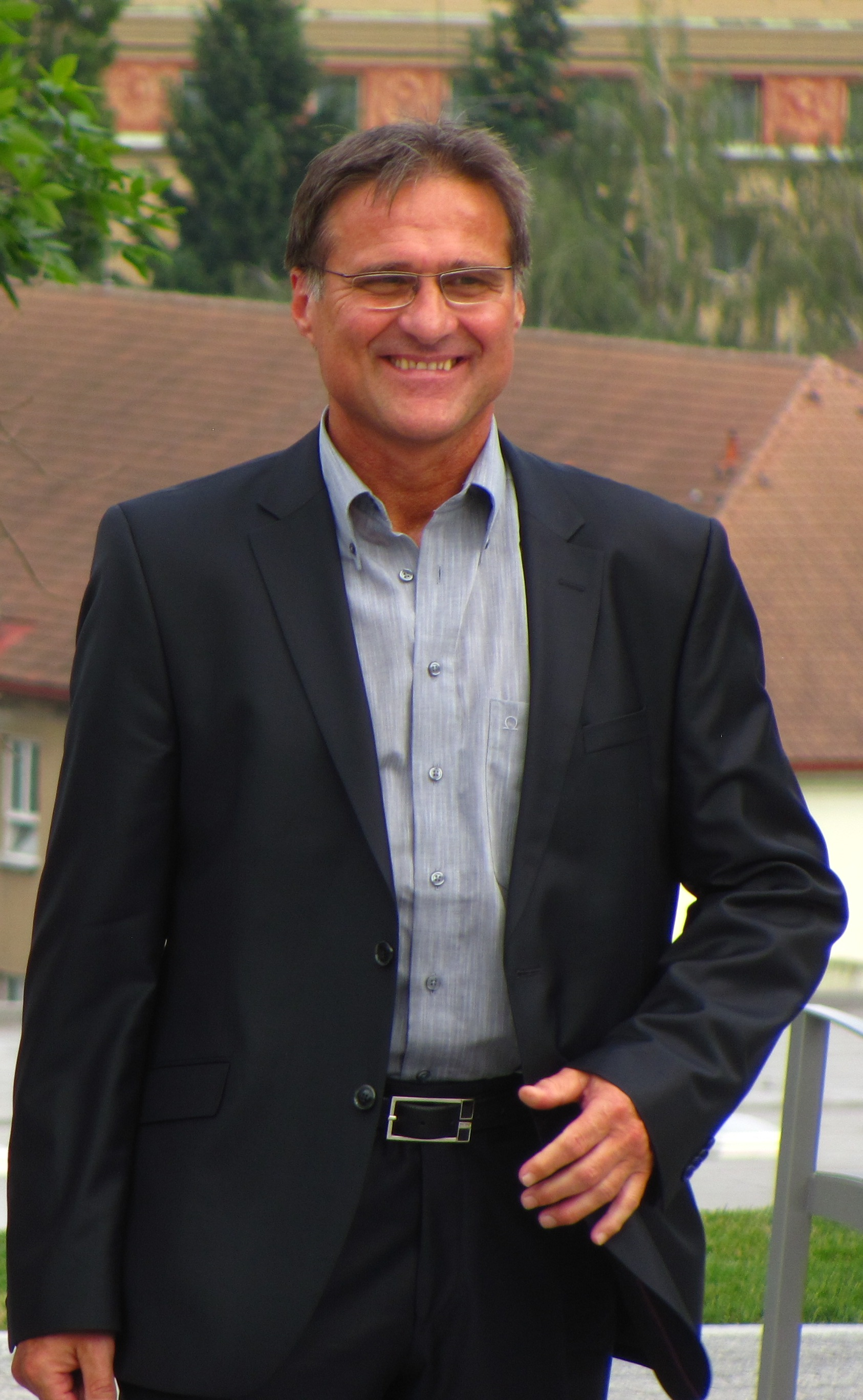
- Jan Fiala (2012)

Personal information
- Date of birth: 19 May 1956 (age 70)
- Place of birth: Slatinice, Czechoslovakia
- Height: 1.78 m (5 ft 10 in)
- Position: Defender

Youth career
- –1972: SK Slatinice
- 1972–1975: Strojírny Uničov

Senior career*
Years	Team	Apps	(Gls)
1975–1987	Dukla Prague	310	(2)
1987–1988	Le Havre AC	28	(0)
1988–1991	FC Bourges		

International career
1977–1987	Czechoslovakia	58	(1)
- * Club domestic league appearances and goals

Jan Fiala (born 19 May 1956 in Slatinice) is a Czech former football player.

He played 58 matches for the Czechoslovakia national football team, for which he scored one goal. He was a member of the bronze team in the 1980 UEFA European Football Championship even if he didn't play a single match. He was a participant in the 1982 FIFA World Cup, where he played all three matches.

Fiala played his whole career in Czechoslovakia for Dukla Prague. He played for them 310 league matches and won the Czechoslovak First League in 1977, 1979 and 1982. In 1982, he was also voted the Czechoslovak Footballer of the Year. He then played for Le Havre AC from 1987 to 1988.
