= Karel Kroupa Jr. =

Czech football player

Karel Kroupa
Personal information
- Full name: Karel Kroupa
- Date of birth: 27 April 1980 (age 46)
- Place of birth: Brno, Czechoslovakia
- Height: 1.93 m (6 ft 4 in)
- Position: Striker

Youth career
- Zbrojovka Brno

Senior career*
Years	Team	Apps	(Gls)
2000–2002	Zbrojovka Brno	5	(0)
2002–2003	Mladá Boleslav	0	(0)
2003–2005	Zbrojovka Brno	51	(5)
2005–2006	Drnovice	0	(0)
2006–2007	Denizlispor	10	(0)
2007	Teplice	9	(1)
2008	Kladno	13	(1)
2008–2010	Tescoma Zlín	37	(15)
2010	Ružomberok	18	(4)
2011	Tescoma Zlín	13	(6)
2011	Senica	11	(2)
2012	Nitra	28	(2)
2013–2014	Zbrojovka Brno	33	(3)
2014–2020	Prostějov	74	(56)
- * Club domestic league appearances and goals as of 10 August 2016

Karel Kroupa (born 27 April 1980) is a former Czech football player, who last played for Prostějov.

== Career ==
In the 2009–2010 season, while playing for Tescoma Zlín, he scored 14 goals and became the best goalscorer of the Czech 2. Liga together with Pavel Černý and Dani Chigou. In June 2011, he joined Slovak club Senica on a one-year contract. On 13 January 2012, Kroupa signed for Slovak side FC Nitra on a two-year contract.

== Personal life ==
Karel is the son of the famous Czechoslovak footballer Karel Kroupa.
