= Slatinice =

- Municipality
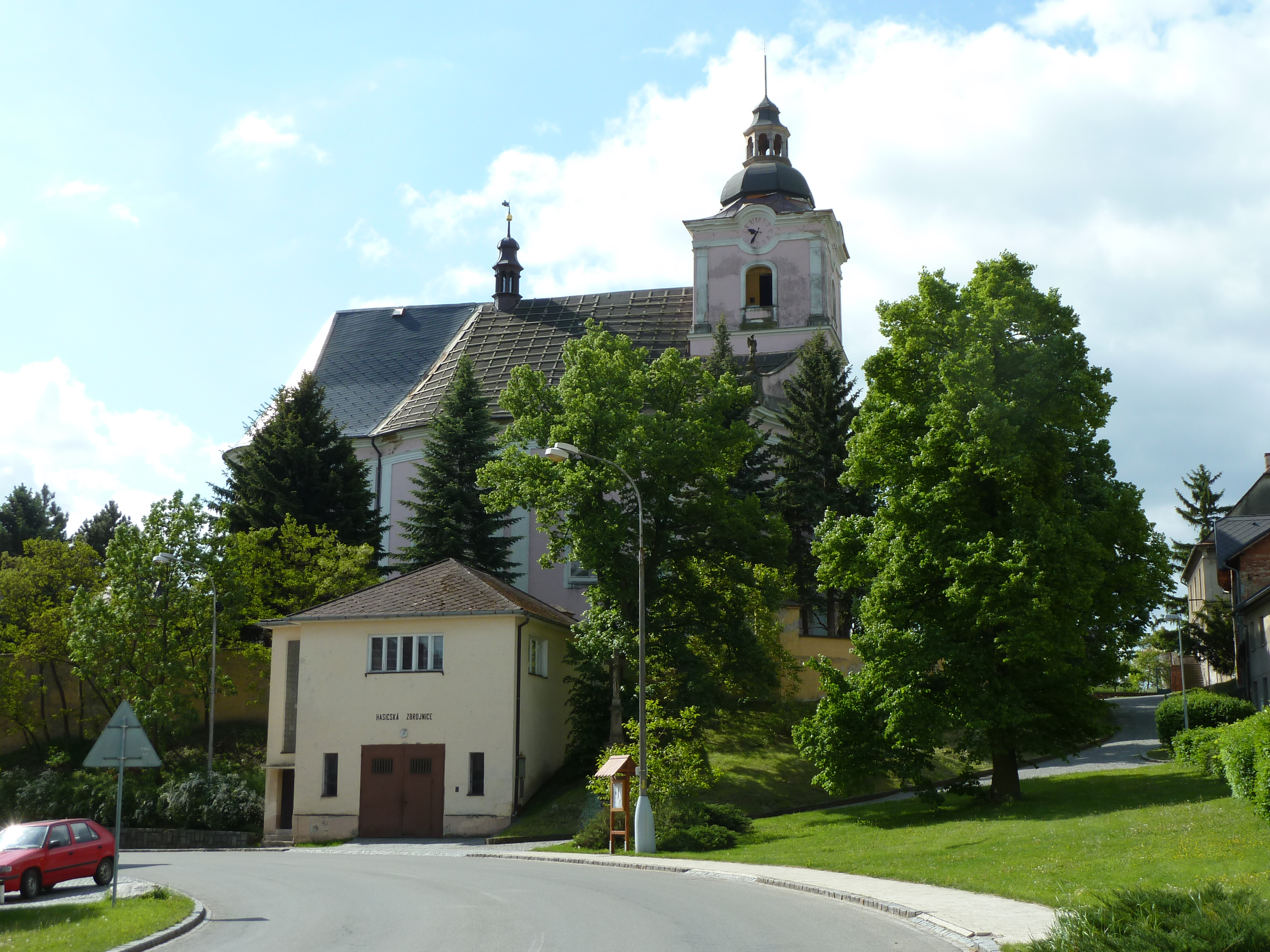
- Church of the Assumption of the Virgin Mary

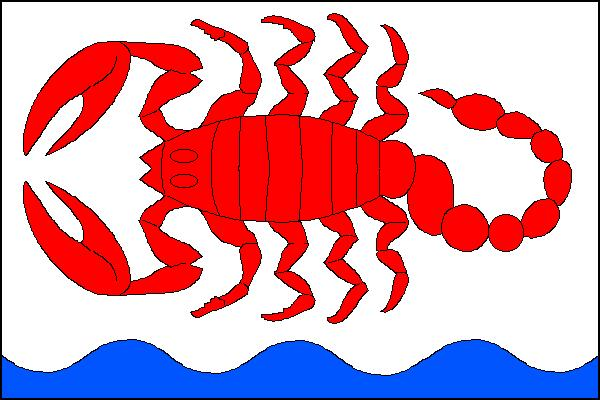
- Flag Coat of arms

- Location in the Czech Republic
- Coordinates: 49°33′42″N 17°6′0″E
- Country: Czech Republic
- Region: Olomouc
- District: Olomouc
- First mentioned: 1247

Area
  - Total: 7.78 km^{2} (3.00 sq mi)
- Elevation: 247 m (810 ft)

Population (2026-01-01)
  - Total: 1,593
  - Density: 205/km^{2} (530/sq mi)
- Time zone: UTC+1 (CET)
  - Summer (DST): UTC+2 (CEST)
- Postal code: 783 42
- Website: www.slatinice.com

Slatinice (German: Groß Latein) is a municipality and village in Olomouc District in the Olomouc Region of the Czech Republic. It has about 1,600 inhabitants.

Slatinice lies approximately 12 kilometres (7 mi) west of Olomouc and 201 km (125 mi) east of Prague.

== Administrative division ==
Slatinice consists of two municipal parts (in brackets population according to the 2021 census):

- Slatinice (1,164)
- Lípy (366)

== Demographics ==
Historical population
Year	Pop.	±%
1869	885	—
1880	975	+10.2%
1890	966	−0.9%
1900	1,075	+11.3%
1910	1,126	+4.7%
1921	1,134	+0.7%
1930	1,384	+22.0%
1950	1,542	+11.4%
1961	1,551	+0.6%
1970	1,421	−8.4%
1980	1,431	+0.7%
1991	1,330	−7.1%
2001	1,398	+5.1%
2011	1,517	+8.5%
2021	1,530	+0.9%
Source: Censuses

== Notable people ==
- Jan Fiala (born 1956), footballer
