= Svein Gunnar Rein =

Norwegian footballer (born 1954)

Personal information
- Date of birth: 10 April 1954 (age 72)

International career
Years	Team	Apps	(Gls)
1979	Norway	3	(1)

Svein Gunnar Rein (born 10 April 1954) is a Norwegian footballer. He played in three matches for the Norway national football team in 1979.
