= 1978 Danish 1st Division =

33rd season of Danish 1st Division

Danish 1st Division
- Season: 1978

Statistics of Danish 1st Division in the 1978 season.

== Overview ==
It was contested by 16 teams, and Vejle Boldklub won the championship.

== League standings ==
Pos	Team	Pld	W	D	L	GF	GA	GD	Pts
1	Vejle Boldklub	30	19	6	5	64	33	+31	44
2	Esbjerg fB	30	16	8	6	50	32	+18	40
3	Aarhus Gymnastikforening	30	15	9	6	52	39	+13	39
4	Odense Boldklub	30	15	8	7	63	39	+24	38
5	Boldklubben 1903	30	13	9	8	48	32	+16	35
6	Kjøbenhavns Boldklub	30	15	4	11	54	39	+15	34
7	Boldklubben af 1893	30	12	9	9	45	40	+5	33
8	Slagelse B&I	30	10	10	10	50	53	−3	30
9	IK Skovbakken	30	10	8	12	47	49	−2	28
10	Boldklubben Frem	30	10	8	12	30	34	−4	28
11	Kastrup Boldklub	30	9	7	14	38	40	−2	25
12	B 1901	30	8	8	14	49	59	−10	24
13	Næstved IF	30	9	6	15	36	47	−11	24
14	Frederikshavn fI	30	7	7	16	37	53	−16	21
15	Køge BK	30	7	7	16	28	53	−25	21
16	Randers Sportsklub Freja	30	6	4	20	39	88	−49	16

== Results ==
Home \ Away	AGF	B93	B01	B03	EfB	FfI	BKF	KAS	KB	KBK	NIF	OB	RSF	SKV	SBI	VBK
Aarhus GF	—	3–1	1–0	1–0	2–3	1–1	0–0	1–0	2–2	2–0	3–1	1–1	4–3	2–0	0–3	3–0
B.93	3–1	—	2–5	0–1	3–1	1–0	2–0	0–0	0–0	3–2	3–0	0–3	3–1	4–0	1–1	1–1
B 1901	0–1	0–2	—	3–5	0–3	2–2	1–1	1–3	1–1	3–0	0–2	3–1	3–0	1–1	3–4	1–2
B 1903	2–4	2–2	2–2	—	0–0	1–0	1–2	2–0	2–1	1–1	1–1	0–1	8–0	6–1	3–1	1–0
Esbjerg fB	1–1	2–1	5–2	4–1	—	1–0	3–0	2–1	1–3	1–1	4–0	1–1	3–1	2–1	3–3	3–0
Frederikshavn fI	1–1	0–2	3–4	0–1	4–0	—	0–2	0–2	0–3	2–0	5–2	1–0	2–2	3–1	2–2	0–1
BK Frem	2–1	0–1	2–2	0–2	0–0	3–1	—	0–2	0–2	2–0	0–1	0–0	2–0	1–0	2–1	1–1
Kastrup BK	1–2	0–0	3–0	0–2	0–0	6–0	0–0	—	1–0	2–1	1–3	2–2	0–1	2–3	1–4	2–2
Kjøbenhavns BK	1–2	4–1	3–4	1–0	0–2	1–2	1–0	2–1	—	6–0	1–0	1–0	5–0	2–2	2–1	1–0
Køge BK	0–0	2–2	0–0	0–0	0–1	3–1	1–0	0–2	1–0	—	0–1	2–3	5–2	0–4	1–0	0–3
Næstved IF	3–1	1–1	1–2	2–0	1–2	0–1	1–3	3–1	1–2	0–2	—	1–4	4–2	1–1	0–0	0–0
Odense BK	2–2	3–1	4–0	1–1	3–0	2–1	0–0	1–1	7–5	3–1	1–0	—	1–0	5–2	7–0	0–3
Randers Freja	2–2	0–1	1–6	0–1	2–1	4–2	4–3	1–3	0–1	1–3	0–4	0–4	—	3–3	2–1	3–5
IK Skovbakken	2–4	2–0	0–0	0–0	0–1	2–0	1–2	3–0	3–0	1–1	2–1	2–1	2–3	—	2–0	0–0
Slagelse B&I	1–2	3–3	2–0	1–1	0–0	1–1	2–0	2–1	2–1	2–0	1–1	4–2	1–1	2–5	—	4–1
Vejle BK	3–2	2–1	2–0	3–1	1–0	2–2	3–2	2–0	3–2	5–1	3–0	4–0	5–0	2–1	5–1	—

Legend: Blue = home team win; Yellow = draw; Red = away team win.
