= Karel Jarůšek =

Czech footballer and manager

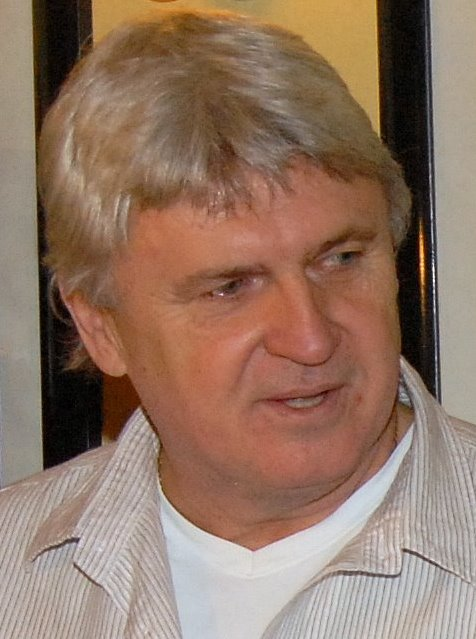
- Karel Jarůšek in 2009

Personal information
- Date of birth: 2 December 1952 (age 73)
- Place of birth: Blansko, Czechoslovakia
- Position: Midfielder

Youth career
- 1959–1967: ČKD Blansko
- 1967–1971: FC Zbrojovka Brno

Senior career*
Years	Team	Apps	(Gls)
1971–1973	Dukla Tábor		
1973–1983	FC Zbrojovka Brno	237	(51)
1983–1985	FC Zbrojovka Brno II.	42	(8)
1985–1987	Panserraikos	28	(2)
1987–1990	SV Sparkasse Stockerau		
1990–1993	1. Wiener Neustädter SC		
1993–1995	SV Eibenstein		

International career
1977–1980	Czechoslovakia	15	(1)

Managerial career
- 1993–1995: SV Eibenstein (playing coach)
- 1995–1997: SK Tuřany
- 1996–1998: FC Boby Brno (co-manager)
- 1998–2000: FC Boby Brno
- 2001–2002: FK Drnovice
- 2002–2003: SFC Opava
- 2003–2004: 1. FC Brno
- * Club domestic league appearances and goals

Karel Jarůšek (born 2 December 1952) is a Czech football manager and former player.

As a player, Jarůšek played mostly for FC Zbrojovka Brno. In 1978, he won the Czechoslovak First League with Zbrojovka. From 1977 to 1980 he was also a member of the Czechoslovakia national football team. After finishing his active career, he started with coaching. Jarůšek coached FC Zbrojovka Brno, FK Drnovice and SFC Opava in the Czech Republic.

From 2003 to 2004 he was a Senator in the Senate of the Czech Republic, where he represented the senate district no. 58 Brno-City and the Civic Democratic Party.
