= 1977–78 Czechoslovak First League =

Czechoslovak First League
- Season: 1977–78
- Champions: Zbrojovka Brno
- Relegated: ZVL Žilina
- European Cup: Zbrojovka Brno
- Cup Winners' Cup: Baník Ostrava
- UEFA Cup: Dukla Prague; Lokomotíva Košice
- Top goalscorer: Karel Kroupa (20 goals)

Statistics of Czechoslovak First League in the 1977–78 season.

== Overview ==
It was contested by 16 teams, and Zbrojovka Brno won the championship. Karel Kroupa was the league's top scorer with 20 goals.

== Stadia and locations ==
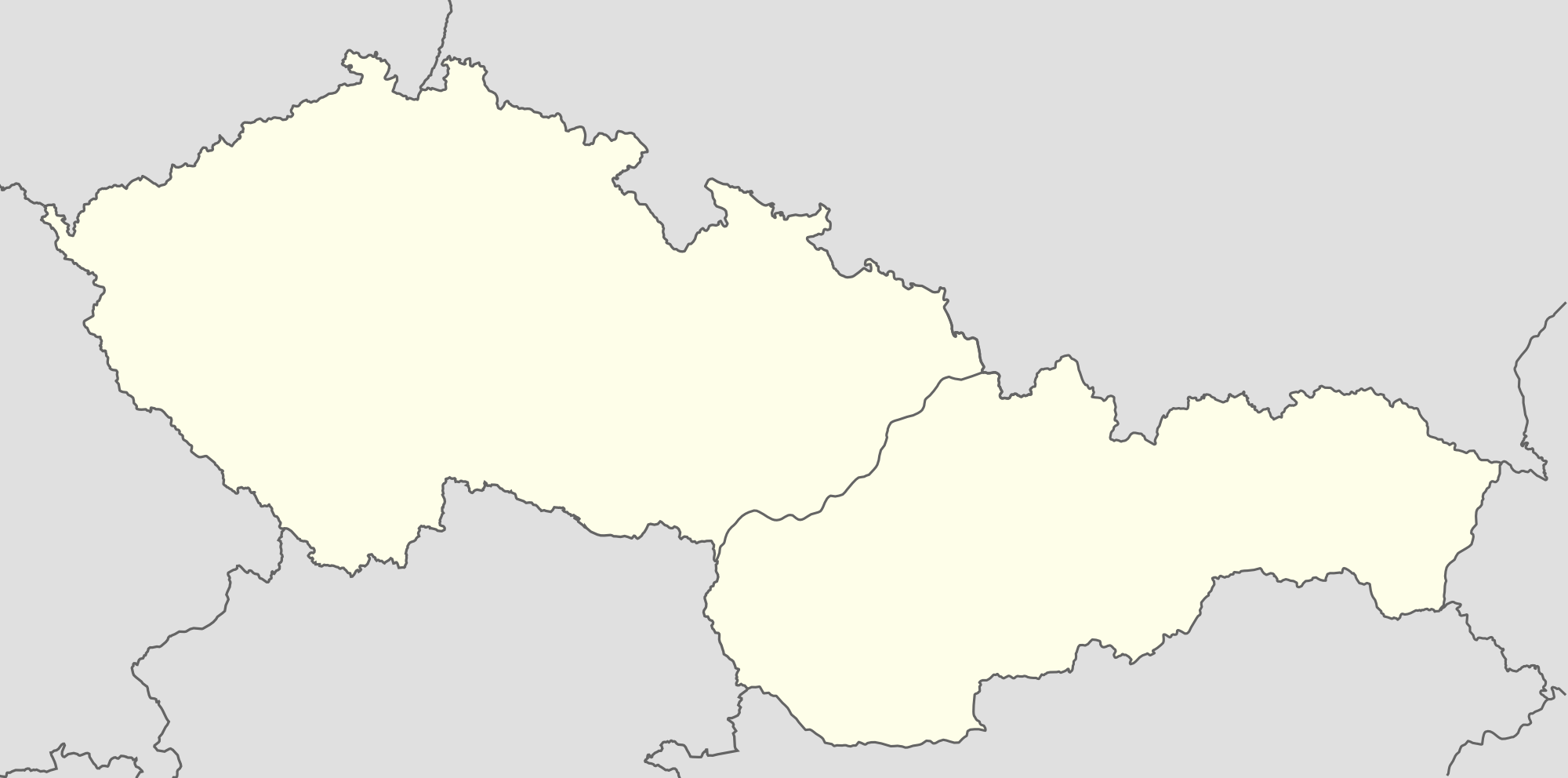
Location of clubs in the 1977–78 Czechoslovak First League

== League standings ==
Pos	Team	Pld	W	D	L	GF	GA	GD	Pts	Qualification or relegation
1	Zbrojovka Brno (C)	30	18	7	5	64	25	+39	43	Qualification for European Cup first round
2	Dukla Prague	30	19	3	8	73	33	+40	41	Qualification for UEFA Cup first round
3	Lokomotíva Košice	30	17	5	8	53	34	+19	39	Qualification for UEFA Cup first round
4	Slavia Prague	30	11	12	7	39	37	+2	34	
5	Sklo Union Teplice	30	11	11	8	28	34	−6	33	
6	Bohemians Prague	30	12	8	10	36	32	+4	32	
7	Tatran Prešov	30	11	8	11	45	40	+5	30	
8	Slovan Bratislava	30	11	7	12	53	46	+7	29	
9	Spartak Trnava	30	8	12	10	26	31	−5	28	
10	Baník Ostrava	30	11	6	13	35	41	−6	28	Qualification for Cup Winners' Cup first round
11	Jednota Trenčín	30	13	2	15	39	46	−7	28	
12	Škoda Plzeň	30	12	2	16	29	42	−13	26	
13	Dukla Banská Bystrica	30	9	8	13	32	46	−14	26	
14	Sparta Prague	30	9	7	14	29	49	−20	25	
15	Inter Bratislava	30	6	10	14	30	46	−16	22	
16	ZVL Žilina (R)	30	5	6	19	29	58	−29	16	Relegation to Slovak National Football League

Source: rsssf.com
(C) Champions; (R) Relegated

== Results ==
Home \ Away	OST	BOH	BB	DUK	INT	TRE	LOK	TEP	PLZ	SLA	SLO	SPA	TRN	PRE	BRN	ŽIL
Baník Ostrava		0–0	1–1	0–1	6–1	3–1	0–5	1–0	1–0	3–0	0–2	1–0	1–0	2–1	1–1	2–1
Bohemians Prague	1–1		3–0	3–2	2–0	1–0	2–0	0–0	2–0	3–3	2–2	4–0	1–0	2–2	0–2	3–0
Dukla Banská Bystrica	2–0	1–0		0–5	5–1	2–0	3–1	0–0	1–2	0–0	0–1	1–1	0–0	0–0	2–1	0–0
Dukla Prague	4–2	4–0	3–1		2–0	3–1	2–1	2–3	3–0	3–1	8–1	3–0	1–2	3–0	3–1	7–0
Inter Bratislava	2–1	0–1	5–0	0–0		2–2	0–2	2–3	0–0	1–1	0–0	2–1	1–1	2–1	1–1	2–1
Jednota Trenčín	4–1	1–0	1–0	4–2	1–0		0–1	3–0	0–1	3–2	2–0	2–1	3–2	3–1	1–0	4–2
Lokomotiva Košice	1–1	1–2	3–0	2–1	2–0	2–1		4–1	2–1	2–1	5–0	1–1	3–0	2–0	1–0	2–0
Sklo Union Teplice	1–0	1–0	0–1	1–0	1–1	1–0	3–1		1–0	1–1	0–0	1–1	1–0	2–0	0–0	1–0
Škoda Plzeň	0–2	2–0	4–2	0–1	3–1	1–0	1–1	3–0		1–0	0–4	2–0	1–0	2–0	0–3	3–2
Slavia Prague	2–1	1–0	2–2	1–1	1–1	1–0	1–0	0–0	2–0		2–1	1–1	2–0	2–1	1–1	4–1
Slovan Bratislava	4–0	1–1	3–4	2–1	1–0	6–2	1–2	1–1	2–0	1–2		6–0	1–2	4–0	1–1	4–0
Sparta Prague	0–2	0–2	1–0	1–4	3–2	5–0	1–1	3–1	2–1	0–0	2–1		1–0	1–0	1–1	2–0
Spartak Trnava	0–0	2–0	1–0	1–1	1–0	1–0	1–1	2–2	2–0	1–1	1–1	2–0		1–1	0–1	1–1
Tatran Prešov	2–1	3–0	2–1	4–0	1–1	1–0	4–1	1–1	4–0	2–0	1–0	3–0	2–2		2–2	3–0
Zbrojovka Brno	2–0	2–0	4–1	0–1	2–0	4–0	5–1	4–0	3–1	5–2	2–1	3–0	4–0	4–2		1–0
ZVL Žilina	2–1	1–1	1–2	1–2	0–2	0–0	1–2	3–1	1–0	1–2	5–1	2–0	0–0	1–1	2–4	

Source: statistiky1ligy.fotbal.cz
Legend: Blue = home team win; Yellow = draw; Red = away team win.

== Attendances ==
No.	Club	Average
1	Brno	19,261
2	Sparta Praha	9,968
3	Slavia Praha	8,667
4	Bohemians	7,519
5	Spartak Trnava	6,465
6	Slovan	6,462
7	Lokomotíva Košice	6,193
8	Tatran Prešov	6,094
9	Baník Ostrava	6,031
10	Dukla Banská Bystrica	5,860
11	Trenčín	5,190
12	Teplice	4,133
13	Dukla Praha	4,112
14	Plzeň	4,029
15	Inter Bratislava	3,023
16	Žilina	2,826
