= Jan Peters (footballer, born 1953) =

Dutch footballer

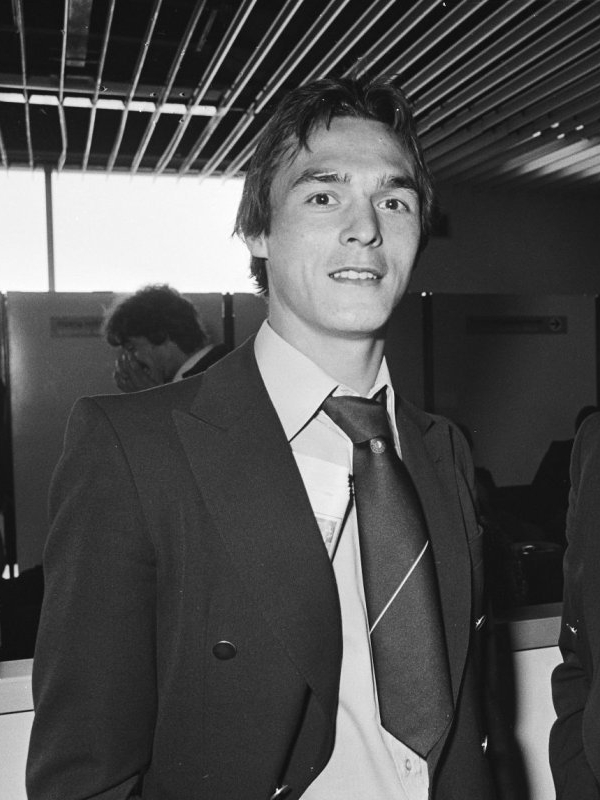
- Peters in 1979

Personal information
- Full name: Wilhelmus Johannes Hendrikus Peters
- Date of birth: 20 July 1953 (age 73)
- Place of birth: Gorinchem, Netherlands
- Height: 1.82 m (6 ft 0 in)
- Position: Forward

Senior career*
Years	Team	Apps	(Gls)
1976–1979	FC Den Bosch '67		
1979–1981	Feyenoord	61	(30)
1981–1983	K.V. Kortrijk		
1983	Sabadell	4	(2)
1983	K.V. Kortrijk		
1983–1984	Espinho	15	(6)
1984	Seiko		
1985–1986	Sabadell	20	(2)

International career
1979	Netherlands	1	(0)
- * Club domestic league appearances and goals

Wilhelmus Johannes Hendrikus Peters (born 20 July 1953), known as Jan Peters, is a Dutch former professional footballer who played as a forward. He made one appearance for the Netherlands national team in 1979.

== Doping ==
In 2010 Peters stated that during his time at Feyenoord he and his teammates received performance-enhancing substances before important matches, such as before the final of the 1979–80 KNVB Cup against Ajax.
