= Ivo Viktor =

Czech former football goalkeeper (born 1942)

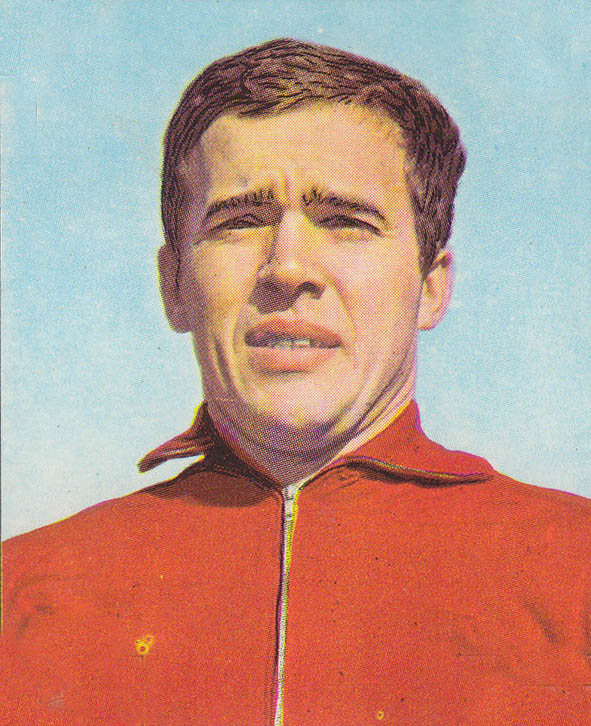
- Viktor at the 1970 FIFA World Cup

Personal information
- Date of birth: 21 May 1942 (age 84)
- Place of birth: Křelov, Protectorate of Bohemia and Moravia
- Position: Goalkeeper

Youth career
- Spartak Šternberk

Senior career*
Years	Team	Apps	(Gls)
1960–1961	Železárny Prostějov		
1961–1962	RH Brno		
1962–1963	Spartak Brno ZJŠ	6	(0)
1963–1977	Dukla Prague	310	(0)
Total		316	(0)

International career
1966–1977	Czechoslovakia	63	(0)

Managerial career
- 1990–1991: Dukla Prague
Medal record
Representing Czechoslovakia
UEFA European Championship
Winner	1976 Yugoslavia
- * Club domestic league appearances and goals

Ivo Viktor (born 21 May 1942) is a Czech former footballer who played as a goalkeeper. He played for Czechoslovakia, representing his country on 63 occasions between 1966 and 1977, taking part in the 1970 FIFA World Cup and winning the 1976 European Championship. Regarded as one of the best goalkeepers of his generation in Europe in his prime, he placed third in the 1976 Ballon d'Or, and was a five-time winner of the Czechoslovak Footballer of the Year award, and a two-time winner of the European Goalkeeper of the Year award.

== Club career ==
In his country, Viktor played for several clubs, including Dukla Prague, where he remained for 13 years, winning several titles.

== International career ==
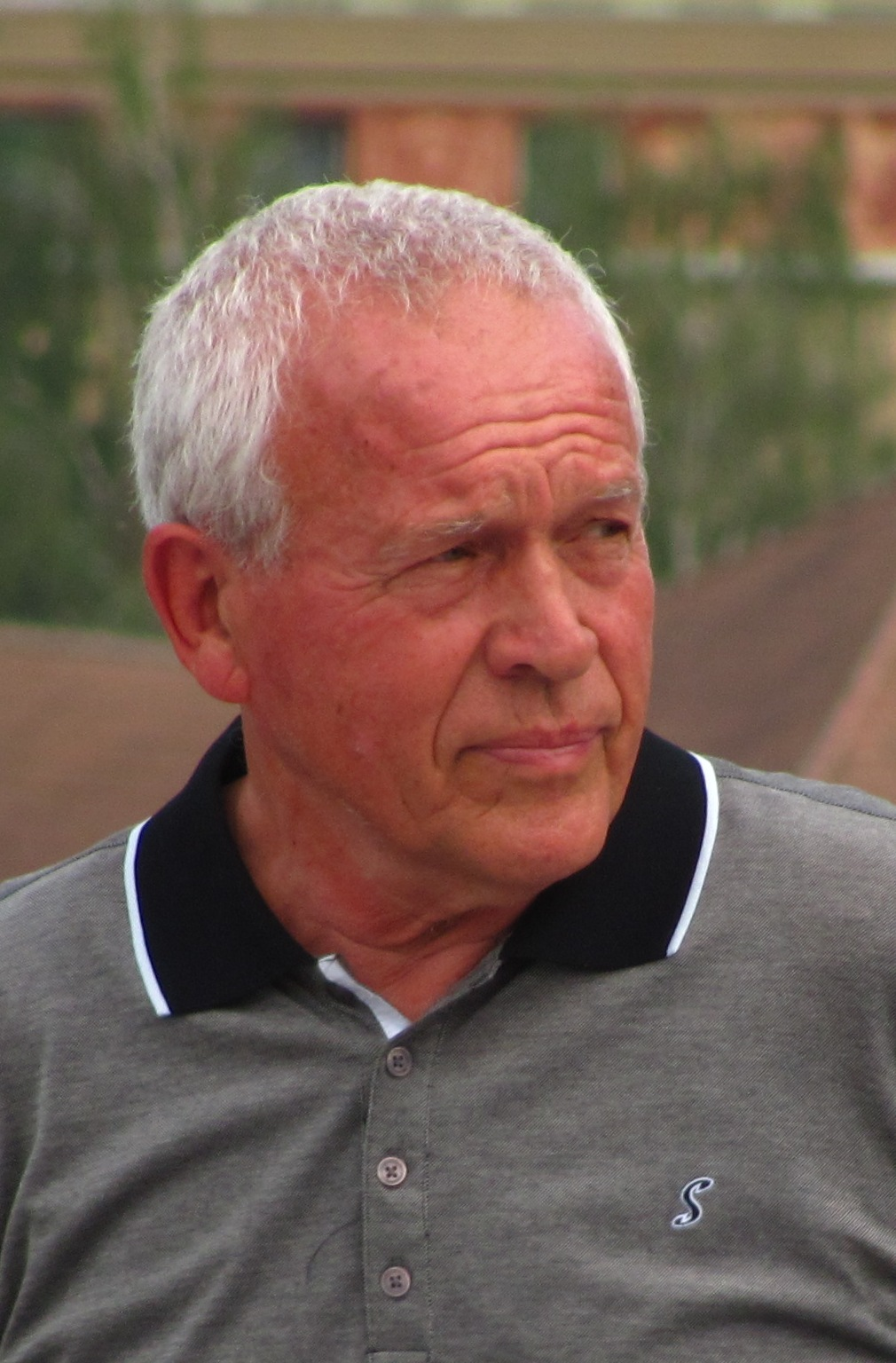
Viktor in 2012

Viktor's senior national team debut came in 1966 against Brazil at the Maracanã stadium. He represented his nation at the 1970 FIFA World Cup. He was one of the brightest stars at UEFA Euro 1976, where he helped Czechoslovakia win the championship, producing notable performances and key saves against the Netherlands in the semi-final, and West Germany in the final, later being named to the team of the tournament. In the same year he came third in the European Footballer of the Year awards. In total, he made 63 international appearances between 1966 and 1977.

== Coaching career ==
Viktor took charge of Dukla Prague for one season as manager, in the 1990–91 Czechoslovak First League. The club finished the season in 11th place.

== Honours ==
=== Club ===
Dukla Prague

- Czechoslovak First League: 1964, 1966, 1977
- Czechoslovak Cup: 1965, 1966, 1969

=== International ===
Czechoslovakia

- UEFA European Football Championship: 1976

=== Individual ===
- FUWO European Team of the Season: 1967
- Czechoslovak Footballer of the Year: 1968, 1972, 1973, 1975, 1976
- Ballon d'Or: Third place 1976
- European Goalkeeper of the Year award: 1969, 1976
- Sport Ideal European XI: 1976
- UEFA Euro Team of the Tournament: 1976
- ADN Eastern European Footballer of the Season: 1976
- Voted 24th in Keeper of the Century – IFFHS' Century Elections.
