= Richard Budding =

Dutch footballer

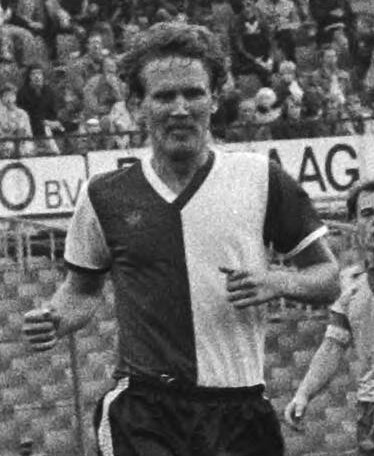

Personal information
- Full name: Richard Budding
- Date of birth: 6 May 1957 (age 69)
- Place of birth: Renkum, Netherlands
- Position: Right winger

Youth career
- CHRC Heelsum

Senior career*
Years	Team	Apps	(Gls)
1975–1977	Wageningen	44	(4)
1977–1982	Feyenoord	121	(10)
1982–1983	Wageningen	16	(1)
1983–1987	Vitesse	69	(7)
1985–1986	→ Wageningen (loan)	14	(1)
Total		264	(23)

International career
1975	Netherlands U-19	1	(0)
- * Club domestic league appearances and goals

Richard Budding (born 6 May 1957 in Renkum, Gelderland) is a retired Dutch footballer who was active as a right winger.

== Club career ==
Budding started his career in his town of birth, Renkum where he played for CHRC Heelsum, before he joined his first Eredivisie side FC Wageningen in 1975. FC Wageningen was underperforming that season and Budding was hardly used, but he made his senior debut on 12 January 1975 against AZ'67. The club relegated to the Eerste Divisie at the end of the season. Once there Budding became a key factor in the team soon and played in most of their matches and also managed to score some goals. Dutch giants Feyenoord showed their interest and signed the player in March 1977. At Feyenoord Budding was a first team regular and won the KNVB Cup in 1980, when Ajax was beaten 3-1 in the final. He played in 13 Europa Cup matches for Feyenoord, scoring one goal.

In 1982 Budding left Feyenoord to return at his first professional team FC Wageningen, followed by two seasons at Vitesse. After switching back to FC Wageningen one more time he also returned to Vitesse for the final seasons of his career. At the age of 33 he did no longer pass the fitness test and was told to retire from professional football. Budding played his last match on 13 December 1989 against Willem II.

== International career ==
Budding played one game for the Netherlands U-19, against France U-19 in 1975.
