= Karel Kroupa =

Czech footballer

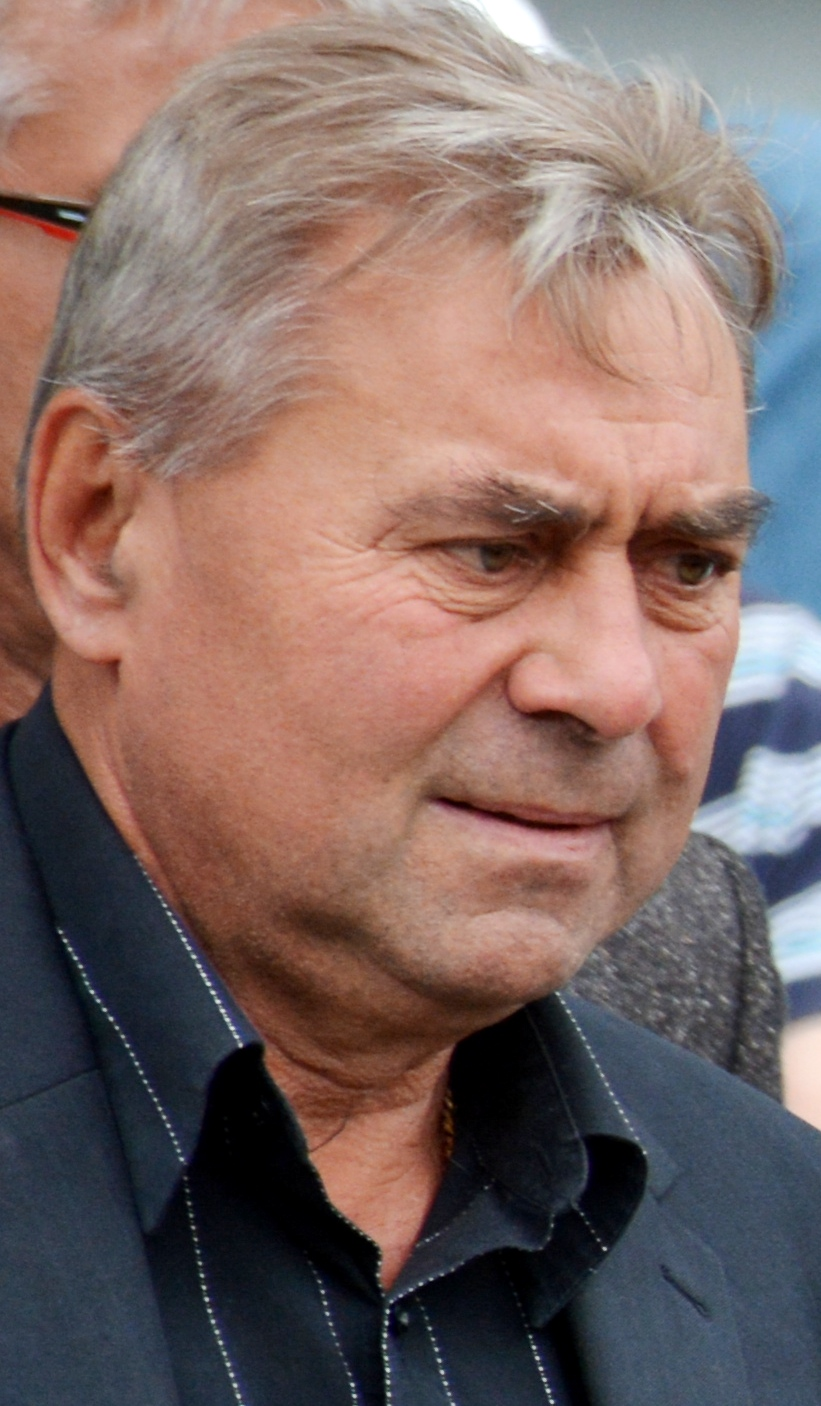

Personal information
- Date of birth: 15 April 1950 (age 76)
- Place of birth: Brno, Czechoslovakia
- Position: Striker

Youth career
- –1966: TJ Sokol Bosonohy

Senior career*
Years	Team	Apps	(Gls)
1966–1969	Spartak KPS Brno	41	(19)
1969–1971	Dukla Tábor	53	(22)
1971–1982	Zbrojovka Brno	277	(118)
1982–1983	TJ Gottwaldov	26	(14)
1983–1985	Zbrojovka Brno	21	(7)

International career
1974–1977	Czechoslovakia U-23	11	(5)
1974–1980	Czechoslovakia	21	(4)
1977	Czechoslovakia B	1	(0)
- * Club domestic league appearances and goals

Karel Kroupa (born 15 April 1950) is a former Czech football player, considered as legendary player of Zbrojovka Brno.

Kroupa played his whole professional career for Zbrojovka Brno. He appeared in 277 league matches and scored 118 goals, becoming the best goalscorer of the club in its history. Kroupa won the Czechoslovak First League with Brno in 1978. It is the only championship for this team to date.

Being a prolific goalscorer, Kroupa became the top scorer of Czechoslovak First League in 1978 and 1979. In 1977, he was voted the Czechoslovak Footballer of the Year.

Kroupa was a member of the Czechoslovakia national football team and played for his country total 21 matches, scoring 4 goals.

His son Karel is also a professional footballer.
