= List of UEFA European Championship winning players =

This page is a list of all players who have won the men's UEFA European Championship tournament since its inception in 1960.

== Winning players ==
A total of 347 players have been in the winning team in the European Championship. Only 14 players have been on the winning team twice, with Rainer Bonhof the only non-Spanish player to do so.

In the table below, years in bold indicate that the player appeared in the respective final where his team won. In contrast, years in italics indicate that the player was an unused squad member in the respective tournament.

Players who have won the European Championship
Player	Team	Titles won		Other appearances	Ref.
Player	Team	Number	Years	Other appearances	Ref.
Raúl Albiol	Spain	2	2008, 2012		
Xabi Alonso	Spain	2	**2008**, **2012**	2004	
Álvaro Arbeloa	Spain	2	2008, **2012**		
Rainer Bonhof	West Germany	2	1972, 1980	1976	
Iker Casillas	Spain	2	**2008**, **2012**	2000, 2004, 2016	
Santi Cazorla	Spain	2	**2008**, 2012		
Cesc Fàbregas	Spain	2	**2008**, **2012**	2016	
Andrés Iniesta	Spain	2	**2008**, **2012**	2016	
Jesús Navas	Spain	2	2012, 2024		
Sergio Ramos	Spain	2	**2008**, **2012**	2016	
Pepe Reina	Spain	2	2008, 2012		
David Silva	Spain	2	**2008**, **2012**	2016	
Fernando Torres	Spain	2	**2008**, **2012**	2004	
Xavi	Spain	2	**2008**, **2012**	2004	
Francesco Acerbi	Italy	1	2020		
Jordi Alba	Spain	1	**2012**	2016, 2020	
Enrico Albertosi	Italy	1	1968		
Klaus Allofs	West Germany	1	**1980**	1984	
Bruno Alves	Portugal	1	2016	2008, 2012	
Amancio	Spain	1	1964		
Manuel Amoros	France	1	**1984**	1992	
Pietro Anastasi	Italy	1	**1968**		
Henrik Andersen	Denmark	1	1992		
Nicolas Anelka	France	1	2000	2008	
Angelo Anquilletti	Italy	1	1968		
German Apukhtin	Soviet Union	1	1960		
Markus Babbel	Germany	1	**1996**	2000	
Álex Baena	Spain	1	2024		
Nicolò Barella	Italy	1	**2020**	2024	
Jozef Barmoš	Czechoslovakia	1	1976	1980	
Fabien Barthez	France	1	**2000**	1996, 2004	
Angelos Basinas	Greece	1	**2004**	2008	
Mario Basler	Germany	1	1996		
Alessandro Bastoni	Italy	1	2020	2024	
Joël Bats	France	1	**1984**		
Patrick Battiston	France	1	**1984**		
Franz Beckenbauer	West Germany	1	**1972**	1976	
Michael Bella	West Germany	1	1972		
Bruno Bellone	France	1	**1984**		
Andrea Belotti	Italy	1	**2020**		
Domenico Berardi	Italy	1	**2020**		
Giancarlo Bercellino	Italy	1	1968		
Philippe Bergeroo	France	1	1984		
Federico Bernardeschi	Italy	1	**2020**	2016	
Přemysl Bičovský	Czechoslovakia	1	1976		
Oliver Bierhoff	Germany	1	**1996**	2000	
Pavol Biroš	Czechoslovakia	1	1976		
Laurent Blanc	France	1	**2000**	1992, 1996	
Fredi Bobic	Germany	1	1996	2004	
Marco Bode	Germany	1	**1996**	2000	
Leonardo Bonucci	Italy	1	**2020**	2012, 2016	
John Bosman	Netherlands	1	1988		
Maxime Bossis	France	1	**1984**		
Daniel Bravo	France	1	1984		
Paul Breitner	West Germany	1	**1972**		
Hans-Peter Briegel	West Germany	1	**1980**	1984	
Morten Bruun	Denmark	1	1992		
Valentin Bubukin	Soviet Union	1	**1960**		
Giacomo Bulgarelli	Italy	1	1968		
Tarcisio Burgnich	Italy	1	**1968**		
Sergio Busquets	Spain	1	**2012**	2016, 2020	
Isacio Calleja	Spain	1	**1964**		
Vincent Candela	France	1	2000		
Joan Capdevila	Spain	1	**2008**	2004	
Jozef Čapkovič	Czechoslovakia	1	**1976**		
Dani Carvajal	Spain	1	**2024**		
Ricardo Carvalho	Portugal	1	2016	2004, 2008	
William Carvalho	Portugal	1	**2016**	2020	
Ernesto Castano	Italy	1	**1968**		
Gaetano Castrovilli	Italy	1	2020		
Cédric	Portugal	1	**2016**		
Kostas Chalkias	Greece	1	2004	2008, 2012	
Angelos Charisteas	Greece	1	**2004**	2008	
Giorgio Chiellini	Italy	1	**2020**	2008, 2012, 2016	
Federico Chiesa	Italy	1	**2020**	2024	
Givi Chokheli	Soviet Union	1	**1960**		
Bent Christensen Arensøe	Denmark	1	1992		
Claus Christiansen	Denmark	1	**1992**		
Kim Christofte	Denmark	1	**1992**		
Bryan Cristante	Italy	1	**2020**	2024	
Cristiano Ronaldo	Portugal	1	**2016**	2004, 2008, 2012, 2020, 2024	
Marc Cucurella	Spain	1	**2024**		
Bernhard Cullmann	West Germany	1	**1980**		
Nikos Dabizas	Greece	1	2004		
Danilo Pereira	Portugal	1	2016	2020	
Rubén de la Red	Spain	1	2008		
Karl Del'Haye	West Germany	1	1980		
Traianos Dellas	Greece	1	**2004**	2008	
Luis del Sol	Spain	1	1964		
Marcel Desailly	France	1	**2000**	1996, 2004	
Didier Deschamps	France	1	**2000**	1992, 1996	
Giancarlo De Sisti	Italy	1	**1968**		
Bernard Dietz	West Germany	1	**1980**	1976	
Giovanni Di Lorenzo	Italy	1	**2020**	2024	
Youri Djorkaeff	France	1	**2000**	1996	
Karol Dobiaš	Czechoslovakia	1	**1976**	1980	
Angelo Domenghini	Italy	1	**1968**		
Jean-François Domergue	France	1	**1984**		
Gianluigi Donnarumma	Italy	1	**2020**	2024	
Christophe Dugarry	France	1	**2000**	1996	
Éder	Portugal	1	**2016**		
Eduardo	Portugal	1	2016	2012	
Dieter Eilts	Germany	1	**1996**		
Eliseu	Portugal	1	2016		
Lars Elstrup	Denmark	1	1992		
Emerson	Italy	1	**2020**		
Giacinto Facchetti	Italy	1	**1968**		
Luis Fernandez	France	1	**1984**	1992	
Jean-Marc Ferreri	France	1	1984		
Giorgio Ferrini	Italy	1	**1968**		
José Fonte	Portugal	1	**2016**	2020	
Bernd Förster	West Germany	1	**1980**	1984	
Karlheinz Förster	West Germany	1	1980	1984	
Alessandro Florenzi	Italy	1	**2020**	2016	
Torben Frank	Denmark	1	1992		
Steffen Freund	Germany	1	1996		
Josep Maria Fusté	Spain	1	**1964**		
Takis Fyssas	Greece	1	**2004**		
Dušan Galis	Czechoslovakia	1	1976		
Gallego	Spain	1	1964		
Sergio García	Spain	1	2008		
Bernard Genghini	France	1	**1984**		
Georgios Georgiadis	Greece	1	2004		
Stelios Giannakopoulos	Greece	1	**2004**	2008	
Alain Giresse	France	1	**1984**		
Koloman Gögh	Czechoslovakia	1	**1976**	1980	
André Gomes	Portugal	1	2016		
Giannis Goumas	Greece	1	2004	2008	
Jürgen Grabowski	West Germany	1	1972		
Álex Grimaldo	Spain	1	2024		
Aristide Guarneri	Italy	1	**1968**		
Raphaël Guerreiro	Portugal	1	**2016**	2020	
Dani Güiza	Spain	1	**2008**		
Ruud Gullit	Netherlands	1	**1988**	1992	
Thomas Häßler	Germany	1	**1996**	1992, 2000	
Thierry Henry	France	1	**2000**	2004, 2008	
Dušan Herda	Czechoslovakia	1	1976		
Jupp Heynckes	West Germany	1	**1972**		
Joop Hiele	Netherlands	1	1988		
Uli Hoeneß	West Germany	1	**1972**	1976	
Horst-Dieter Höttges	West Germany	1	**1972**		
Horst Hrubesch	West Germany	1	**1980**		
Ciro Immobile	Italy	1	**2020**	2016	
Lorenzo Insigne	Italy	1	**2020**	2016	
José Ángel Iribar	Spain	1	**1964**		
Valentin Ivanov	Soviet Union	1	**1960**	1964	
John Jensen	Denmark	1	**1992**	1988	
João Mário	Portugal	1	**2016**		
Jorginho	Italy	1	**2020**	2024	
Joselu	Spain	1	2024		
Juanfran	Spain	1	2012	2016	
Juanito	Spain	1	2008	2004	
Antonio Juliano	Italy	1	**1968**		
Walter Junghans	West Germany	1	1980		
Ladislav Jurkemik	Czechoslovakia	1	**1976**	1980	
Pantelis Kafes	Greece	1	2004		
Oliver Kahn	Germany	1	1996	2000, 2004	
Zaur Kaloev	Soviet Union	1	1960		
Manfred Kaltz	West Germany	1	**1980**	1976	
Michalis Kapsis	Greece	1	**2004**		
Giorgos Karagounis	Greece	1	2004	2008, 2012	
Christian Karembeu	France	1	2000	1996	
Fanis Katergiannakis	Greece	1	2004		
Kostas Katsouranis	Greece	1	**2004**	2008, 2012	
Vladimir Kesarev	Soviet Union	1	1960		
Wim Kieft	Netherlands	1	1988	1992	
Wolfgang Kleff	West Germany	1	1972		
Jürgen Klinsmann	Germany	1	**1996**	1988, 1992	
Erwin Koeman	Netherlands	1	**1988**		
Ronald Koeman	Netherlands	1	**1988**	1992	
Wim Koevermans	Netherlands	1	1988		
Jürgen Kohler	Germany	1	1996	1988, 1992	
Andreas Köpke	Germany	1	**1996**	1992	
Horst Köppel	West Germany	1	1972		
Yury Kovalyov	Soviet Union	1	1960		
Erwin Kremers	West Germany	1	**1972**		
Mogens Krogh	Denmark	1	1992	1996	
Anatoly Krutikov	Soviet Union	1	**1960**		
Hendrie Krüzen	Netherlands	1	1988		
Stefan Kuntz	Germany	1	**1996**		
Bernard Lacombe	France	1	**1984**		
Vasilios Lakis	Greece	1	2004		
Bernard Lama	France	1	2000	1996	
Lamine Yamal	Spain	1	**2024**		
Carlos Lapetra	Spain	1	**1964**		
Aymeric Laporte	Spain	1	**2024**	2020	
Henrik Larsen	Denmark	1	**1992**	1996	
Brian Laudrup	Denmark	1	**1992**	1996	
Frank Lebœuf	France	1	2000	1996	
Robin Le Normand	Spain	1	**2024**		
Yvon Le Roux	France	1	**1984**		
Bixente Lizarazu	France	1	**2000**	1996, 2004	
Fernando Llorente	Spain	1	2012		
Manuel Locatelli	Italy	1	**2020**		
Giovanni Lodetti	Italy	1	**1968**		
Hannes Löhr	West Germany	1	1972		
Anthony Lopes	Portugal	1	2016	2020	
Fermín López	Spain	1	2024		
Felix Magath	West Germany	1	1980		
Sepp Maier	West Germany	1	**1972**	1976	
Marcelino	Spain	1	**1964**		
Carlos Marchena	Spain	1	**2008**	2004	
Javi Martínez	Spain	1	2012		
Vladimir Maslachenko	Soviet Union	1	1960		
Anatoli Maslyonkin	Soviet Union	1	**1960**		
Marián Masný	Czechoslovakia	1	**1976**	1980	
Juan Mata	Spain	1	**2012**		
Lothar Matthäus	West Germany	1	1980	1984, 1988, 2000	
Sandro Mazzola	Italy	1	**1968**		
Mikheil Meskhi	Soviet Union	1	**1960**		
Caspar Memering	West Germany	1	1980		
Alex Meret	Italy	1	2020	2024	
Mikel Merino	Spain	1	**2024**		
Slava Metreveli	Soviet Union	1	**1960**		
Johan Micoud	France	1	2000		
Jozef Móder	Czechoslovakia	1	**1976**		
Johnny Mølby	Denmark	1	1992		
Andreas Möller	Germany	1	1996	1992	
Álvaro Morata	Spain	1	**2024**	2016, 2020	
João Moutinho	Portugal	1	**2016**	2008, 2012, 2020	
Gerd Müller	West Germany	1	**1972**		
Hansi Müller	West Germany	1	**1980**		
Arnold Mühren	Netherlands	1	**1988**		
Nacho	Spain	1	**2024**		
Nani	Portugal	1	**2016**	2008, 2012	
Fernando Navarro	Spain	1	2008		
Álvaro Negredo	Spain	1	2012		
Zdeněk Nehoda	Czechoslovakia	1	**1976**	1980	
Igor Netto	Soviet Union	1	**1960**		
Günter Netzer	West Germany	1	**1972**		
Kent Nielsen	Denmark	1	**1992**		
Peter Nielsen	Denmark	1	1992		
Themistoklis Nikolaidis	Greece	1	2004		
Antonios Nikopolidis	Greece	1	**2004**	2008	
Ferran Olivella	Spain	1	**1964**		
Dani Olmo	Spain	1	**2024**	2020	
Lars Olsen	Denmark	1	**1992**	1988, 1996	
Anton Ondruš	Czechoslovakia	1	**1976**	1980	
Mikel Oyarzabal	Spain	1	**2024**	2020	
Andrés Palop	Spain	1	2008		
Antonín Panenka	Czechoslovakia	1	**1976**	1980	
Dimitrios Papadopoulos	Greece	1	**2004**		
Paquito	Spain	1	1964		
Rui Patrício	Portugal	1	**2016**	2008, 2012, 2020	
Pedri	Spain	1	2024	2020	
Pedro	Spain	1	**2012**	2016	
Pepe	Portugal	1	**2016**	2008, 2012, 2020	
Chus Pereda	Spain	1	**1964**		
Ayoze Pérez	Spain	1	2024		
Matteo Pessina	Italy	1	2020		
Emmanuel Petit	France	1	2000	1992	
Ladislav Petráš	Czechoslovakia	1	1976		
Torben Piechnik	Denmark	1	**1992**	1996	
Robert Pirès	France	1	**2000**	2004	
Gerard Piqué	Spain	1	**2012**	2016	
Ján Pivarník	Czechoslovakia	1	**1976**		
Jaroslav Pollák	Czechoslovakia	1	**1976**	1980	
Michel Platini	France	1	**1984**		
Viktor Ponedelnik	Soviet Union	1	**1960**	1964	
Flemming Povlsen	Denmark	1	**1992**	1988	
Pierino Prati	Italy	1	**1968**		
Carles Puyol	Spain	1	**2008**	2004	
Ricardo Quaresma	Portugal	1	**2016**	2008, 2012	
Ulrich Ramé	France	1	2000		
David Raya	Spain	1	2024		
Giacomo Raspadori	Italy	1	2020	2024	
Oliver Reck	Germany	1	1996		
Severino Reija	Spain	1	1964		
Álex Remiro	Spain	1	2024		
Stefan Reuter	Germany	1	1996	1992	
Frank Rijkaard	Netherlands	1	**1988**	1992	
Gigi Riva	Italy	1	**1968**		
Gianni Rivera	Italy	1	1968		
Feliciano Rivilla	Spain	1	**1964**		
Rodri	Spain	1	**2024**	2020	
Roberto Rosato	Italy	1	**1968**		
Fabián Ruiz	Spain	1	**2024**	2020	
Karl-Heinz Rummenigge	West Germany	1	**1980**	1984	
Albert Rust	France	1	1984		
Salvador Sadurní	Spain	1	1964		
Sandro Salvadore	Italy	1	**1968**		
Matthias Sammer	Germany	1	**1996**	1992	
Renato Sanches	Portugal	1	**2016**	2020	
Giourkas Seitaridis	Greece	1	**2004**	2008	
Peter Schmeichel	Denmark	1	**1992**	1988, 1996, 2000	
René Schneider	Germany	1	1996		
Mehmet Scholl	Germany	1	**1996**	2000	
Harald Schumacher	West Germany	1	**1980**	1984	
Bernd Schuster	West Germany	1	**1980**		
Hans-Georg Schwarzenbeck	West Germany	1	**1972**	1976	
Marcos Senna	Spain	1	**2008**		
Adrien Silva	Portugal	1	**2016**		
Rafa Silva	Portugal	1	2016	2020	
Unai Simón	Spain	1	**2024**	2020	
Salvatore Sirigu	Italy	1	2020	2012, 2016	
John Sivebæk	Denmark	1	**1992**	1984, 1988	
Didier Six	France	1	1984		
Leonardo Spinazzola	Italy	1	2020		
František Štambachr	Czechoslovakia	1	1976	1980	
Uli Stielike	West Germany	1	**1980**	1984	
Thomas Strunz	Germany	1	**1996**		
Luis Suárez	Spain	1	**1964**		
Wilbert Suvrijn	Netherlands	1	1988		
Ján Švehlík	Czechoslovakia	1	**1976**		
Lilian Thuram	France	1	**2000**	1996, 2004, 2008	
Jean Tigana	France	1	**1984**		
Jens Todt	Germany	1	1996		
Rafael Tolói	Italy	1	2020		
Ferran Torres	Spain	1	2024	2020	
David Trezeguet	France	1	**2000**	2004	
Sjaak Troost	Netherlands	1	1988		
Viktor Tsaryov	Soviet Union	1	1960		
Vasilios Tsiartas	Greece	1	2004		
Thierry Tusseau	France	1	1984		
Víctor Valdés	Spain	1	2012		
Berry van Aerle	Netherlands	1	**1988**	1992	
Marco van Basten	Netherlands	1	**1988**	1992	
Hans van Breukelen	Netherlands	1	**1988**	1980, 1992	
Gerald Vanenburg	Netherlands	1	**1988**		
Adri van Tiggelen	Netherlands	1	**1988**	1992	
John van 't Schip	Netherlands	1	1988	1992	
Alexander Vencel	Czechoslovakia	1	1976		
Stylianos Venetidis	Greece	1	**2004**		
Marco Verratti	Italy	1	**2020**		
František Veselý	Czechoslovakia	1	**1976**		
Patrick Vieira	France	1	**2000**	2004, 2008	
Vieirinha	Portugal	1	2016		
Lido Vieri	Italy	1	1968		
Ivo Viktor	Czechoslovakia	1	**1976**		
Kim Vilfort	Denmark	1	**1992**	1988, 1996	
Daniel Vivian	Spain	1	2024		
Berti Vogts	West Germany	1	1972	1976	
Miroslav Votava	West Germany	1	1980		
Yuriy Voynov	Soviet Union	1	**1960**		
Zisis Vryzas	Greece	1	**2004**		
Nico Williams	Spain	1	**2024**		
Sylvain Wiltord	France	1	**2000**	2004	
Herbert Wimmer	West Germany	1	**1972**	1976	
Aron Winter	Netherlands	1	1988	1992, 1996, 2000	
Jan Wouters	Netherlands	1	**1988**	1992	
Lev Yashin	Soviet Union	1	**1960**	1964	
Theodoros Zagorakis	Greece	1	**2004**		
Zinédine Zidane	France	1	**2000**	1996, 2004	
Christian Ziege	Germany	1	**1996**	2000, 2004	
Herbert Zimmermann	West Germany	1	1980		
Ignacio Zoco	Spain	1	**1964**		
Dino Zoff	Italy	1	**1968**	1980	
Martín Zubimendi	Spain	1	**2024**		

== By year ==
In the below table, players highlighted in bold appeared in the respective finals, while players highlighted in italics were unused squad members in the respective tournaments.

Squads of teams that won the European Championship
Year	Team	Squad	Manager	Ref
1960	Soviet Union (detailed squad)	V. Maslachenko • **L. Yashin** • **G. Chokheli** • V. Kesarev • **A. Krutikov** • **A. Maslyonkin** • V. Tsaryov • **I. Netto** • **Y. Voynov** • G. Apukhtin • **V. Bubukin** • **V. Ivanov** • Z. Kaloev • Y. Kovalyov • **M. Meskhi** • **S. Metreveli** • **V. Ponedelnik**	G. Kachalin	
1964	Spain (detailed squad)	**J. Iribar** • S. Sadurní • **I. Calleja** • Gallego • **F. Olivella** • S. Reija • **F. Rivilla** • L. del Sol • **J. Fusté** • Paquito • **C. Pereda** • **I. Zoco** • **Amancio** • **C. Lapetra** • **Marcelino** • **L. Suárez**	J. Villalonga	
1968	Italy (detailed squad)	1 E. Albertosi • 2 **P. Anastasi** • 3 A. Anquilletti • 4 G. Bercellino • 5 **T. Burgnich** • 6 G. Bulgarelli • 7 **E. Castano** • 8 **G. De Sisti** • 9 **A. Domenghini** • 10 **G. Facchetti** • 11 **G. Ferrini** • 12 **A. Guarneri** • 13 **A. Juliano** • 14 **G. Lodetti** • 15 **S. Mazzola** • 16 **P. Prati** • 17 **G. Riva** • 18 G. Rivera • 19 **R. Rosato** • 20 **S. Salvadore** • 21 L. Vieri • 22 **D. Zoff**	F. Valcareggi	
1972	West Germany (detailed squad)	1 **S. Maier** • 2 **H.-D. Höttges** • 3 **P. Breitner** • 4 **H.-G. Schwarzenbeck** • 5 **F. Beckenbauer** • 6 **H. Wimmer** • 7 J. Grabowski • 8 **U. Hoeneß** • 9 **J. Heynckes** • 10 **G. Netzer** • 11 **E. Kremers** • 13 **G. Müller** • 14 B. Vogts • 15 R. Bonhof • 16 M. Bella • 17 H. Löhr • 18 H. Köppel • 22 W. Kleff	H. Schön	
1976	Czechoslovakia (detailed squad)	1 **I. Viktor** • 2 **K. Dobiaš** • 3 **J. Čapkovič** • 4 **A. Ondruš** • 5 **J. Pivarník** • 6 **L. Jurkemik** • 7 **A. Panenka** • 8 **J. Moder** • 9 J. Pollák • 10 **M. Masný** • 11 **Z. Nehoda** • 12 **K. Gögh** • 13 J. Barmoš • 14 P. Biroš • 15 D. Herda • 16 **F. Veselý** • 17 **J. Švehlík** • 18 D. Galis • 19 L. Petráš • 20 F. Štambachr • 21 P. Bičovský • 22 A. Vencel	V. Ježek	
1980	West Germany (detailed squad)	1 **H. Schumacher** • 2 **H.-P. Briegel** • 3 **B. Cullmann** • 4 K. Förster • 5 **B. Dietz** • 6 **B. Schuster** • 7 **B. Förster** • 8 **K.-H. Rummenigge** • 9 **H. Hrubesch** • 10 **H. Müller** • 11 **K. Allofs** • 12 C. Memering • 13 R. Bonhof • 14 F. Magath • 15 **U. Stielike** • 16 H. Zimmermann • 17 K. Del’Haye • 18 L. Matthäus • 19 M. Votava • 20 **M. Kaltz** • 21 W. Junghans • 22 E. Immel	J. Derwall	
1984	France (detailed squad)	1 **J. Bats** • 2 **M. Amoros** • 3 **J.-F. Domergue** • 4 **M. Bossis** • 5 **P. Battiston** • 6 **L. Fernández** • 7 J.-M. Ferreri • 8 D. Bravo • 9 **B. Genghini** • 10 **M. Platini** • 11 **B. Bellone** • 12 **A. Giresse** • 13 D. Six • 14 **J. Tigana** • 15 **Y. Le Roux** • 16 D. Rocheteau • 17 **B. Lacombe** • 18 T. Tusseau • 19 P. Bergeroo • 20 A. Rust	M. Hidalgo	
1988	Netherlands (detailed squad)	1 **H. van Breukelen** • 2 **A. van Tiggelen** • 3 S. Troost • 4 **R. Koeman** • 5 A. Winter • 6 **B. van Aerle** • 7 **G. Vanenburg** • 8 **A. Mühren** • 9 J. Bosman • 10 **R. Gullit** • 11 J. van ’t Schip • 12 **M. van Basten** • 13 **E. Koeman** • 14 W. Kieft • 15 W. Koevermans • 16 J. Hiele • 17 **F. Rijkaard** • 18 W. Suvrijn • 19 H. Krüzen • 20 **J. Wouters**	R. Michels	
1992	Denmark (detailed squad)	1 **P. Schmeichel** • 2 **J. Sivebæk** • 3 **K. Nielsen** • 4 **L. Olsen** • 5 H. Andersen • 6 **K. Christofte** • 7 **J. Jensen** • 8 J. Mølby • 9 **F. Povlsen** • 10 L. Elstrup • 11 **B. Laudrup** • 12 **T. Piechnik** • 13 **H. Larsen** • 14 T. Frank • 15 B. Christensen Arensøe • 16 M. Krogh • 17 **C. Christiansen** • 18 **K. Vilfort** • 19 P. Nielsen • 20 M. Bruun	R. Nielsen	
1996	Germany (detailed squad)	1 **A. Köpke** • 2 S. Reuter • 3 **M. Bode** • 4 S. Freund • 5 **T. Helmer** • 6 **M. Sammer** • 7 A. Möller • 8 **M. Scholl** • 9 F. Bobic • 10 **T. Häßler** • 11 **S. Kuntz** • 12 O. Kahn • 13 M. Basler • 14 **M. Babbel** • 15 J. Kohler • 16 R. Schneider • 17 **C. Ziege** • 18 **J. Klinsmann** • 19 **T. Strunz** • 20 **O. Bierhoff** • 21 **D. Eilts** • 22 O. Reck • 23 J. Todt	B. Vogts	
2000	France (detailed squad)	1 B. Lama • 2 V. Candela • 3 **B. Lizarazu** • 4 **P. Vieira** • 5 **L. Blanc** • 6 **Y. Djorkaeff** • 7 **D. Deschamps** • 8 **M. Desailly** • 9 N. Anelka • 10 **Z. Zidane** • 11 **R. Pirès** • 12 **T. Henry** • 13 **S. Wiltord** • 14 J. Micoud • 15 **L. Thuram** • 16 **F. Barthez** • 17 E. Petit • 18 F. Lebœuf • 19 C. Karembeu • 20 **D. Trezeguet** • 21 **C. Dugarry** • 22 U. Ramé	R. Lemerre	
2004	Greece (detailed squad)	1 **A. Nikopolidis** • 2 **G. Seitaridis** • 3 **S. Venetidis** • 4 N. Dabizas • 5 **T. Dellas** • 6 **A. Basinas** • 7 **T. Zagorakis** • 8 **S. Giannakopoulos** • 9 **A. Charisteas** • 10 V. Tsiartas • 11 T. Nikolaidis • 12 K. Chalkias • 13 F. Katergiannakis • 14 **T. Fyssas** • 15 **Z. Vryzas** • 16 P. Kafes • 17 G. Georgiadis • 18 G. Goumas • 19 **M. Kapsis** • 20 G. Karagounis • 21 **K. Katsouranis** • 22 **D. Papadopoulos** • 23 V. Lakis	O. Rehhagel	
2008	Spain (detailed squad)	1 **I. Casillas** • 2 R. Albiol • 3 F. Navarro • 4 **C. Marchena** • 5 **C. Puyol** • 6 **A. Iniesta** • 7 D. Villa • 8 **Xavi** • 9 **F. Torres** • 10 **C. Fàbregas** • 11 **J. Capdevila** • 12 **S. Cazorla** • 13 A. Palop • 14 **X. Alonso** • 15 **S. Ramos** • 16 S. García • 17 **D. Güiza** • 18 Á. Arbeloa • 19 **M. Senna** • 20 Juanito • 21 **D. Silva** • 22 R. de la Red • 23 P. Reina	L. Aragonés	
2012	Spain (detailed squad)	1 **I. Casillas** • 2 R. Albiol • 3 **G. Piqué** • 4 J. Martínez • 5 Juanfran • 6 **A. Iniesta** • 7 **Pedro** • 8 **Xavi** • 9 **F. Torres** • 10 **C. Fàbregas** • 11 Á. Negredo • 12 V. Valdés • 13 **J. Mata** • 14 **X. Alonso** • 15 **S. Ramos** • 16 **S. Busquets** • 17 **Á. Arbeloa** • 18 **J. Alba** • 19 F. Llorente • 20 S. Cazorla • 21 **D. Silva** • 22 J. Navas • 23 P. Reina	V. del Bosque	
2016	Portugal (detailed squad)	1 **R. Patrício** • 2 B. Alves • 3 **Pepe** • 4 **J. Fonte** • 5 **R. Guerreiro** • 6 R. Carvalho • 7 **Cristiano Ronaldo** • 8 **J. Moutinho** • 9 **Éder** • 10 **João Mário** • 11 Vieirinha • 12 A. Lopes • 13 Danilo • 14 **W. Carvalho** • 15 A. Gomes • 16 **R. Sanches** • 17 **Nani** • 18 R. Silva • 19 Eliseu • 20 **R. Quaresma** • 21 **Cédric** • 22 Eduardo • 23 **A. Silva**	F. Santos	
2020	Italy (detailed squad)	1 S. Sirigu • 2 **G. Di Lorenzo** • 3 **G. Chiellini** • 4 L. Spinazzola • 5 **M. Locatelli** • 6 **M. Veratti** • 7 G. Castrovilli • 8 **Jorginho** • 9 **A. Belotti** • 10 **L. Insigne** • 11 **D. Berardi** • 12 M. Pessina • 13 **Emerson** • 14 **F. Chiesa** • 15 F. Acerbi • 16 **B. Cristante** • 17 **C. Immobile** • 18 **N. Barella** • 19 **L. Bonucci** • 20 **F. Bernardeschi** • 21 **G. Donnarumma** • 22 G. Raspadori • 23 A. Bastoni • 24 **A. Florenzi** • 25 R. Tolói • 26 A. Meret	R. Mancini	
2024	Spain (detailed squad)	1 D. Raya • 2 **D. Carvajal** • 3 **R. Le Normand** • 4 **Nacho** • 5 D. Vivian • 6 **M. Merino** • 7 **Á. Morata** • 8 **F. Ruiz** • 9 Joselu • 10 **D. Olmo** • 11 **F. Torres** • 12 Á. Grimaldo • 13 Á. Remiro • 14 **A. Laporte** • 15 Á. Baena • 16 **Rodri** • 17 **N. Williams** • 18 **M. Zubimendi** • 19 **Lamine Yamal** • 20 Pedri • 21 **M. Oyarzabal** • 22 J. Navas • 23 **U. Simón** • 24 **M. Cucurella** • 25 F. López • 26 A. Pérez	L. de la Fuente	

== See also ==
- UEFA European Championship
- List of UEFA European Championship finals
- List of players who have appeared in multiple UEFA European Championships
- List of UEFA European Championship winning managers
