= UEFA Euro 1976 squads =

These are the squads for the 1976 European Football Championship tournament in Yugoslavia, which took place between 16 June and 20 June 1976. The players' listed ages are their ages on the tournament's opening day (16 June 1976).

== Czechoslovakia ==
Manager: Václav Ježek

No.	Pos.	Player	Date of birth (age)	Caps	Club
1	GK	Ivo Viktor	21 May 1942 (aged 34)	60	(Czechoslovakia) Dukla Prague
2	DF	Karol Dobiaš	18 December 1947 (aged 28)	51	(Czechoslovakia) Spartak Trnava
3	DF	Jozef Čapkovič	1 November 1948 (aged 27)	20	(Czechoslovakia) Slovan Bratislava
4	DF	Anton Ondruš (captain)	27 March 1950 (aged 26)	43	(Czechoslovakia) Slovan Bratislava
5	DF	Ján Pivarník	13 November 1947 (aged 28)	34	(Czechoslovakia) Slovan Bratislava
6	DF	Ladislav Jurkemik	20 July 1953 (aged 22)	12	(Czechoslovakia) Internacionál Slovnaft Bratislava
7	MF	Antonín Panenka	2 December 1948 (aged 27)	16	(Czechoslovakia) Bohemians Prague
8	MF	Jozef Móder	19 September 1947 (aged 28)	10	(Czechoslovakia) Lokomotíva Košice
9	MF	Jaroslav Pollák	11 July 1947 (aged 28)	34	(Czechoslovakia) VSS Košice
10	FW	Marián Masný	13 August 1950 (aged 25)	22	(Czechoslovakia) Slovan Bratislava
11	FW	Zdeněk Nehoda	9 May 1952 (aged 24)	29	(Czechoslovakia) Dukla Prague
12	DF	Koloman Gögh	7 January 1948 (aged 28)	14	(Czechoslovakia) Slovan Bratislava
13	DF	Jozef Barmoš	28 August 1954 (aged 21)	0	(Czechoslovakia) Internacionál Slovnaft Bratislava
14	DF	Pavol Biroš	1 April 1953 (aged 23)	6	(Czechoslovakia) Slavia Prague
15	MF	Dušan Herda	15 July 1951 (aged 24)	2	(Czechoslovakia) Slavia Prague
16	FW	František Veselý	7 December 1943 (aged 32)	31	(Czechoslovakia) Slavia Prague
17	FW	Ján Švehlík	17 January 1950 (aged 26)	15	(Czechoslovakia) Slovan Bratislava
18	FW	Dušan Galis	24 November 1946 (aged 29)	8	(Czechoslovakia) VSS Košice
19	FW	Ladislav Petráš	1 December 1946 (aged 29)	21	(Czechoslovakia) Internacionál Slovnaft Bratislava
20	MF	František Štambachr	13 February 1953 (aged 23)	0	(Czechoslovakia) Dukla Prague
21	MF	Přemysl Bičovský	18 August 1950 (aged 25)	29	(Czechoslovakia) Sklo Union Teplice
22	GK	Alexander Vencel	8 February 1944 (aged 32)	22	(Czechoslovakia) Slovan Bratislava

== Netherlands ==
Manager: George Knobel

No.	Pos.	Player	Date of birth (age)	Caps	Club
1	GK	Piet Schrijvers	15 December 1946 (aged 29)	11	(Netherlands) Ajax
2	DF	Wim Suurbier	16 January 1945 (aged 31)	45	(Netherlands) Ajax
3	DF	Wim Rijsbergen	18 January 1952 (aged 24)	14	(Netherlands) Feyenoord
4	DF	Adrie van Kraay	1 August 1953 (aged 22)	8	(Netherlands) PSV Eindhoven
5	DF	Ruud Krol	24 March 1949 (aged 27)	39	(Netherlands) Ajax
6	MF	Johan Neeskens	15 September 1951 (aged 24)	32	(Spain) Barcelona
7	MF	Wim Jansen	28 October 1946 (aged 29)	39	(Netherlands) Feyenoord
8	FW	Johnny Rep	25 November 1951 (aged 24)	17	(Spain) Valencia
9	MF	Johan Cruyff (captain)	25 April 1947 (aged 29)	42	(Spain) Barcelona
10	MF	Willy van de Kerkhof	16 September 1951 (aged 24)	5	(Netherlands) PSV Eindhoven
11	FW	Rob Rensenbrink	3 July 1947 (aged 28)	25	(Belgium) Anderlecht
12	MF	Willem van Hanegem	20 February 1944 (aged 32)	45	(Netherlands) Feyenoord
13	FW	Ruud Geels	28 July 1948 (aged 27)	8	(Netherlands) Ajax
14	MF	Jan Peters	18 August 1954 (aged 21)	9	(Netherlands) NEC
15	FW	René van de Kerkhof	16 September 1951 (aged 24)	11	(Netherlands) PSV Eindhoven
16	MF	Peter Arntz	5 February 1953 (aged 23)	2	(Netherlands) Go Ahead Eagles
17	GK	Jan Ruiter	24 November 1946 (aged 29)	0	(Belgium) Anderlecht
18	GK	Jan Jongbloed	25 November 1940 (aged 35)	14	(Netherlands) FC Amsterdam
19	FW	Kees Kist	7 August 1952 (aged 23)	3	(Netherlands) AZ '67
20	DF	Wim Meutstege	28 June 1952 (aged 23)	0	(Netherlands) Sparta Rotterdam

== West Germany ==
Manager: Helmut Schön

No.	Pos.	Player	Date of birth (age)	Caps	Club
1	GK	Sepp Maier	28 February 1944 (aged 32)	69	(West Germany) Bayern Munich
2	DF	Berti Vogts	30 December 1946 (aged 29)	73	(West Germany) Borussia Mönchengladbach
3	DF	Bernard Dietz	22 March 1948 (aged 28)	8	(West Germany) MSV Duisburg
4	DF	Hans-Georg Schwarzenbeck	3 April 1948 (aged 28)	41	(West Germany) Bayern Munich
5	DF	Franz Beckenbauer (captain)	11 September 1945 (aged 30)	100	(West Germany) Bayern Munich
6	MF	Herbert Wimmer	9 November 1944 (aged 31)	34	(West Germany) Borussia Mönchengladbach
7	MF	Rainer Bonhof	29 March 1952 (aged 24)	17	(West Germany) Borussia Mönchengladbach
8	MF	Uli Hoeneß	5 January 1952 (aged 24)	38	(West Germany) Bayern Munich
9	FW	Dieter Müller	1 April 1954 (aged 22)	1	(West Germany) 1. FC Köln
10	MF	Erich Beer	9 December 1946 (aged 29)	10	(West Germany) Hertha BSC
11	FW	Bernd Hölzenbein	9 March 1946 (aged 30)	23	(West Germany) Eintracht Frankfurt
12	FW	Ronnie Worm	7 October 1953 (aged 22)	9	(West Germany) MSV Duisburg
13	MF	Dietmar Danner	29 November 1950 (aged 25)	5	(West Germany) Borussia Mönchengladbach
14	MF	Hannes Bongartz	3 October 1951 (aged 24)	1	(West Germany) Schalke 04
15	MF	Heinz Flohe	28 January 1948 (aged 28)	21	(West Germany) 1. FC Köln
16	DF	Peter Nogly	14 January 1947 (aged 29)	0	(West Germany) Hamburger SV
17	DF	Manfred Kaltz	6 January 1953 (aged 23)	4	(West Germany) Hamburger SV
18	GK	Rudi Kargus	15 August 1952 (aged 23)	2	(West Germany) Hamburger SV

== Yugoslavia ==
Manager: Ante Mladinić

No.	Pos.	Player	Date of birth (age)	Caps	Club
1	GK	Ognjen Petrović	2 January 1948 (aged 28)	13	(Socialist Federal Republic of Yugoslavia) Red Star Belgrade
2	DF	Ivan Buljan	11 December 1949 (aged 26)	23	(Socialist Federal Republic of Yugoslavia) Hajduk Split
3	DF	Enver Hadžiabdić	6 November 1945 (aged 30)	11	(Belgium) Charleroi
4	DF	Dražen Mužinić	25 January 1953 (aged 23)	16	(Socialist Federal Republic of Yugoslavia) Hajduk Split
5	DF	Josip Katalinski	12 May 1948 (aged 28)	37	(France) Nice
6	FW	Ivica Šurjak	23 March 1953 (aged 23)	25	(Socialist Federal Republic of Yugoslavia) Hajduk Split
7	FW	Danilo Popivoda	1 May 1947 (aged 29)	14	(West Germany) Eintracht Braunschweig
8	MF	Branko Oblak	27 May 1947 (aged 29)	41	(West Germany) Schalke 04
9	MF	Jovan Aćimović (captain)	21 June 1948 (aged 27)	53	(Socialist Federal Republic of Yugoslavia) Red Star Belgrade
10	MF	Jurica Jerković	25 February 1950 (aged 26)	36	(Socialist Federal Republic of Yugoslavia) Hajduk Split
11	FW	Dragan Džajić	30 May 1946 (aged 30)	80	(France) Bastia
12	GK	Enver Marić	23 April 1948 (aged 28)	32	(Socialist Federal Republic of Yugoslavia) Velež Mostar
13	FW	Vahid Halilhodžić	15 May 1952 (aged 24)	1	(Socialist Federal Republic of Yugoslavia) Velež Mostar
14	MF	Edhem Šljivo	16 March 1950 (aged 26)	3	(Socialist Federal Republic of Yugoslavia) FK Sarajevo
15	MF	Franjo Vladić	19 October 1951 (aged 24)	20	(Socialist Federal Republic of Yugoslavia) Velež Mostar
16	MF	Momčilo Vukotić	2 June 1950 (aged 26)	8	(Socialist Federal Republic of Yugoslavia) Partizan Belgrade
17	FW	Slaviša Žungul	28 July 1954 (aged 21)	4	(Socialist Federal Republic of Yugoslavia) Hajduk Split
20	DF	Luka Peruzović	26 February 1952 (aged 24)	4	(Socialist Federal Republic of Yugoslavia) Hajduk Split
