= List of UEFA European Championship winning managers =

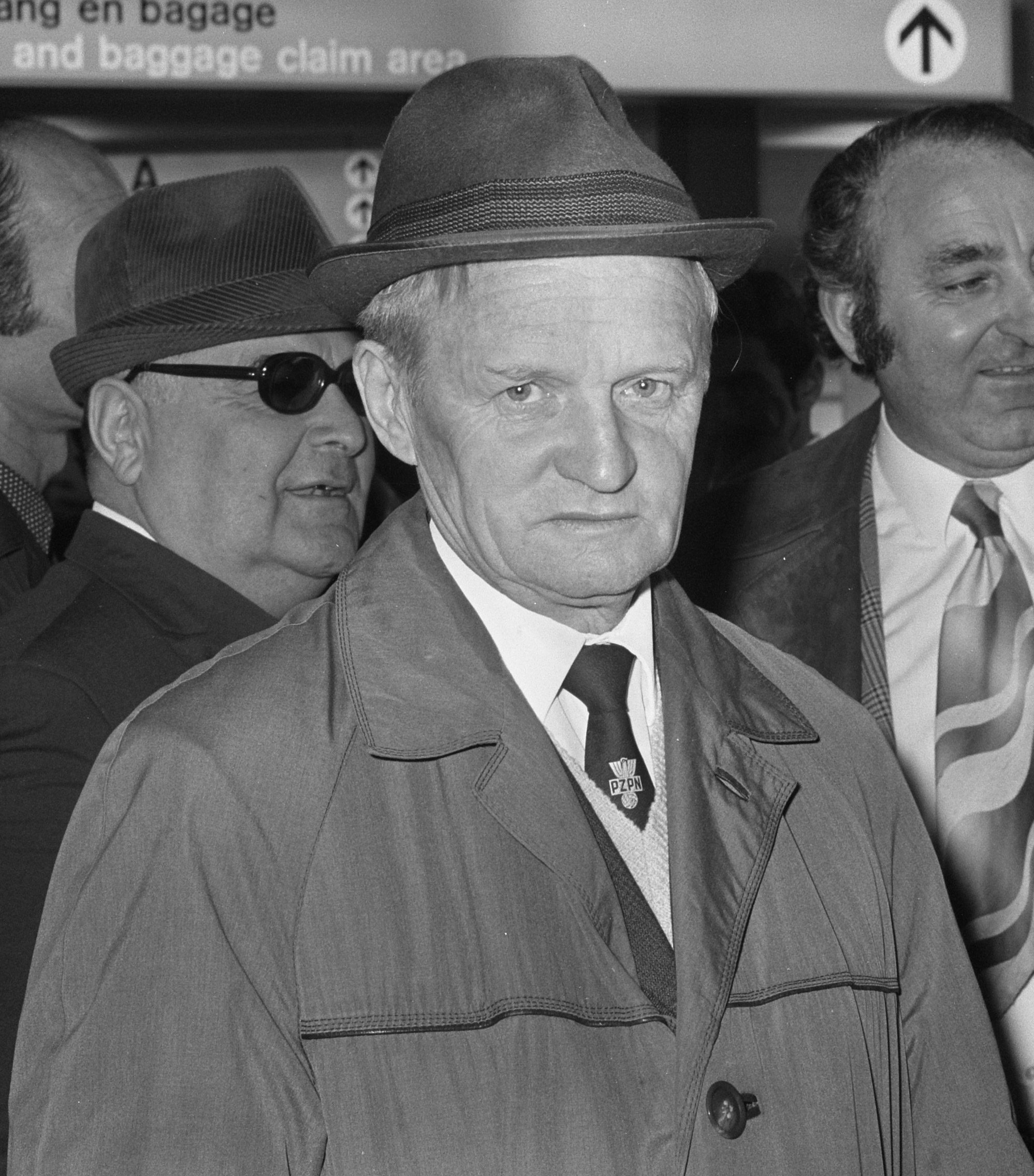
Gavriil Kachalin was the first manager to win the UEFA European Championship.

The UEFA European Championship is the primary national association football tournament in Europe. The seventeen completed tournaments have been won by ten national teams: Spain has won four titles, Germany has won three, France and Italy have each won two titles, and the Soviet Union, Czechoslovakia, the Netherlands, Denmark, Greece and Portugal have each won one title. The role of the manager is to select the squad for the European Championship and develop the tactics of the team. Pressure is attached to the role due to the significance of winning the competition and the lack of day-to-day contact with players during the regular club season aside from international breaks.

Gavriil Kachalin led the Soviet Union to victory in the inaugural tournament in 1960. No manager has won the title on more than one occasion at the men's Championship, and all winning managers of the men's Championship have won it with their native countries, with the exception of German coach Otto Rehhagel leading Greece to victory in 2004. Two managers have both won and lost a European Championship final: Helmut Schön (winner in 1972 and runner-up in 1976, both with West Germany) and Berti Vogts (winner in 1996 and runner-up in 1992, both with Germany). Vogts is also the only person to win the European Championship as both a player and a manager, having previously lifted the trophy while playing for West Germany in 1972. Schön, Vicente del Bosque and Luis de la Fuente are the only managers to have won the European Championship and World Cup; Schön managed Germany to the 1974 World Cup after winning the European Championship in 1972, del Bosque led Spain to victory in the 2010 World Cup before winning the European Championship in 2012 and de la Fuente led Spain to the 2026 World Cup after winning the European Championship in 2024.

José Villalonga is the youngest manager to win the trophy, he was 44 years and 192 days old when he led Spain to victory in 1964. The oldest manager to win the European Championship is Luis Aragonés, who was 69 years and 336 days old when Spain won in 2008. Joachim Löw and Lars Lagerbäck jointly hold the record for managing at the most European Championships, with both leading teams at four different tournaments; Löw additionally holds the records for most matches managed (21) and most matches won (12) in the competition, all coming between the 2008 and 2020 tournaments.

== Winning managers ==
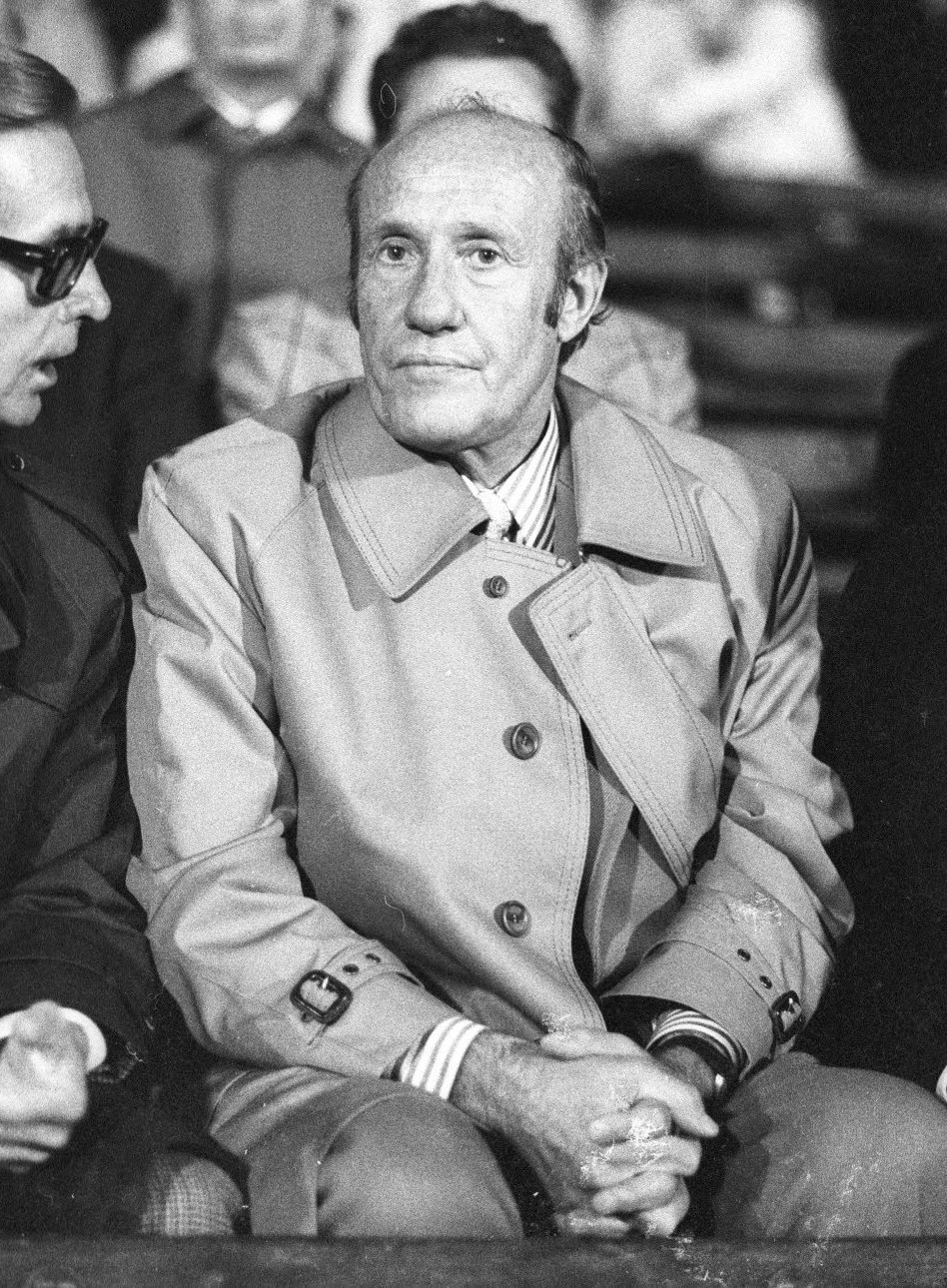
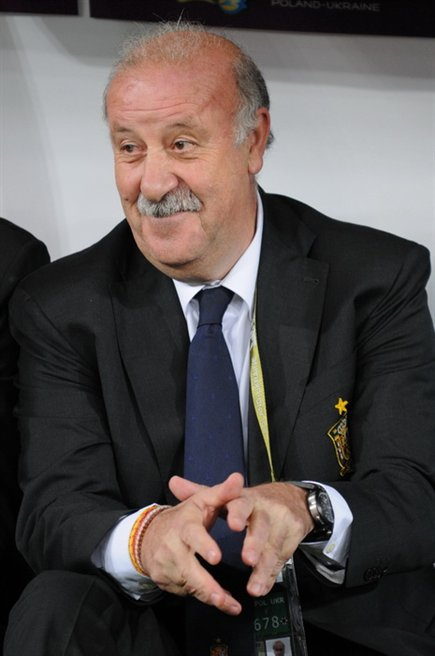
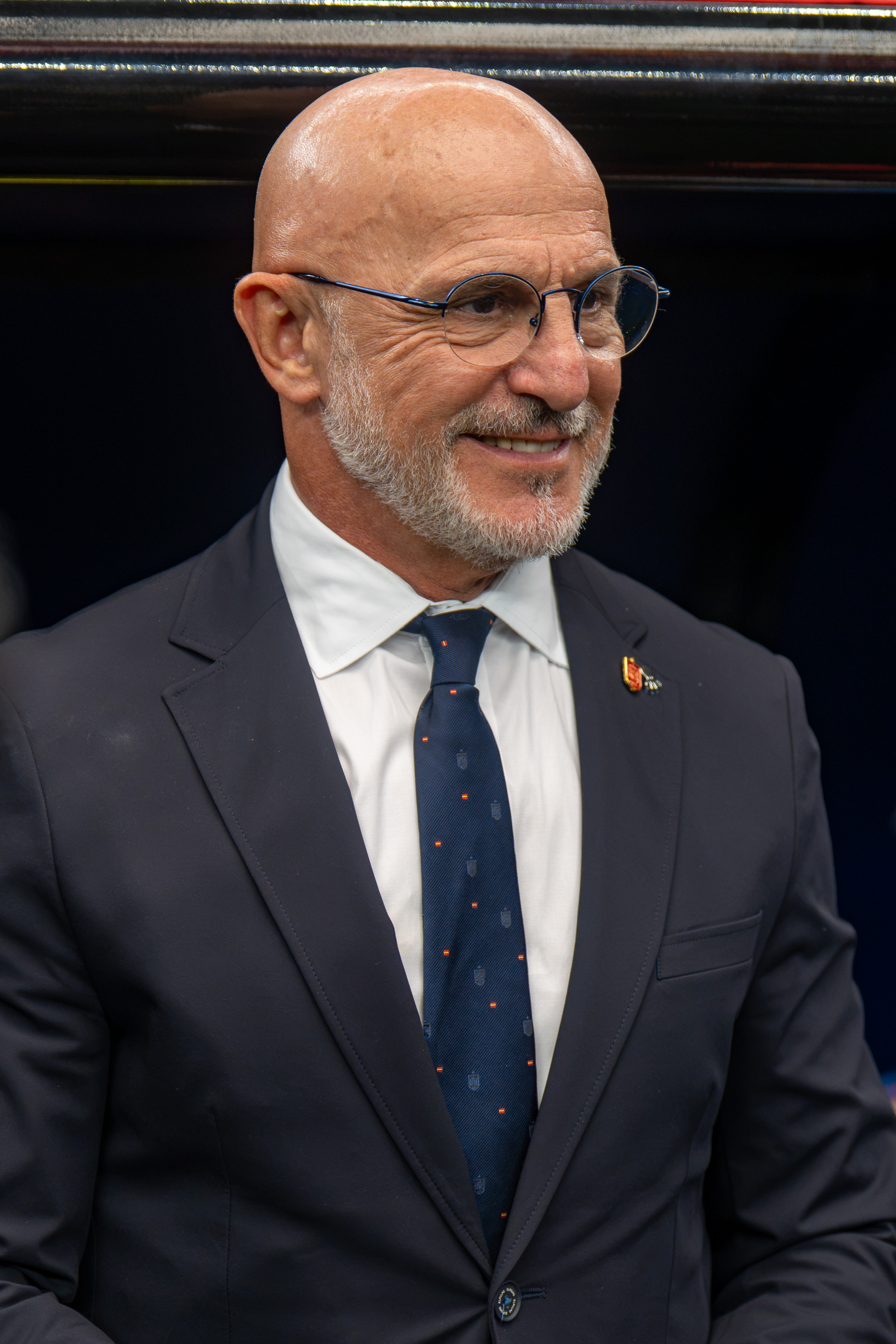
Helmut Schön of Germany (left), Vicente del Bosque (middle) and Luis de la Fuente (right) of Spain are the only three managers to have won the European Championship and the FIFA World Cup. De la Fuente is the most recent manager to have won the tournament.

UEFA European Championship-winning managers
Year	Winning manager	Nationality	Winning national team
1960	Gavriil Kachalin	Soviet Union	Soviet Union
1964	José Villalonga	Spain	Spain
1968	Ferruccio Valcareggi	Italy	Italy
1972	Helmut Schön	West Germany	West Germany
1976	Václav Ježek	Czechoslovakia	Czechoslovakia
1980	Jupp Derwall	West Germany	West Germany
1984	Michel Hidalgo	France	France
1988	Rinus Michels	Netherlands	Netherlands
1992	Richard Møller Nielsen	Denmark	Denmark
1996	Berti Vogts	Germany	Germany
2000	Roger Lemerre	France	France
2004	Otto Rehhagel	Germany	Greece
2008	Luis Aragonés	Spain	Spain
2012	Vicente del Bosque	Spain	Spain
2016	Fernando Santos	Portugal	Portugal
2020	Roberto Mancini	Italy	Italy
2024	Luis de la Fuente	Spain	Spain

== By nationality ==
Winning managers by nationality
Nationality	Manager(s)	Number of wins
Germany (Note: Includes West Germany)	4	4
Spain	4	4
France	2	2
Italy	2	2
Russia (Note: Includes Soviet Union)	1	1
Slovakia (Note: Includes Czechoslovakia)	1	1
Netherlands	1	1
Denmark	1	1
Portugal	1	1

== See also ==
- UEFA European Championship
- List of UEFA European Championship finals
- List of UEFA European Championship winning players
