= List of Sporting CP records and statistics =

This List of Sporting CP records and statistics provides information about Sporting Clube de Portugal, which is a Portuguese sports club based in Lisbon. The club is particularly renowned for its football branch. With more than 150,000 registered club members, Sporting CP is one of the most successful and popular sports clubs in Portugal. Its teams, athletes, and supporters are often nicknamed Os Leões (The Lions).

== Honours ==
=== Domestic competitions ===
- Primeira Liga

- Winners (21): 1940–41, 1943–44, 1946–47, 1947–48, 1948–49, 1950–51, 1951–52, 1952–53, 1953–54, 1957–58, 1961–62, 1965–66, 1969–70, 1973–74, 1979–80, 1981–82, 1999–2000, 2001–02, 2020–21, 2023–24, 2024–25
- Runners-up (22): 1934–35, 1938–39, 1939–40, 1941–42, 1942–43, 1949–50, 1959–60, 1960–61, 1967–68, 1970–71, 1976–77, 1984–85, 1994–95, 1996–97, 2005–06, 2006–07, 2007–08, 2008–09, 2013–14, 2015–16, 2021–22, 2025–26

- Campeonato de Portugal (*defunct)

- Winners (4): 1922–23, 1933–34, 1935–36, 1937–38
- Runners-up (6): 1922, 1924–25, 1927–28, 1932–33, 1934–35, 1936–37

- Taça de Portugal

- Winners (18): 1940–41, 1944–45, 1945–46, 1947–48, 1953–54, 1962–63, 1970–71, 1972–73, 1973–74, 1977–78, 1981–82, 1994–95, 2001–02, 2006–07, 2007–08, 2014–15, 2018–19, 2024–25
- Runners-up (14): 1951–52, 1954–55, 1959–60, 1969–70, 1971–72, 1978–79, 1986–87, 1993–94, 1995–96, 1999–2000, 2011–12, 2017–18, 2023–24, 2025–26

- Taça da Liga

- Winners (4): 2017–18, 2018–19, 2020–21, 2021–22
- Runners-up (3): 2007–08, 2008–09, 2022–23

- Supertaça Cândido de Oliveira

- Winners (9): 1982, 1987, 1995, 2000, 2002, 2007, 2008, 2015, 2021
- Runners-up (3): 1980, 2019, 2024

- Taça Império

- Winners (1): 1943–44

- Taça Monumental "O Século"

- Winners (2): 1948, 1953

=== Doubles ===
- Primeira Liga & Taça de Portugal

7: 1940–41, 1947–48, 1953–54, 1973–74, 1981–82, 2001–02, 2024–25

- Primeira Liga & Taça da Liga

1: 2020–21

- Taça de Portugal & Taça da Liga

1 – shared record: 2018–19

=== Domestic multiple trophies ===
- Taça de Portugal & Supertaça Cândido de Oliveira

1: 2007–08

- Taça da Liga & Supertaça Cândido de Oliveira

1: 2021–22

=== Regional competitions ===
- Campeonato de Lisboa

- Winners (19): 1915, 1919, 1922, 1923, 1925, 1928, 1931, 1934, 1935, 1936, 1937, 1938, 1939, 1941, 1942, 1943, 1945, 1947, 1948

- Taça de Honra

- Winners (13): 1915, 1916, 1917, 1948, 1962, 1964, 1966, 1971, 1985, 1991, 1992, 2014, 2015

- Campeonato de reservas

- Winners (16): 1934–35, 1937–38, 1939–40, 1941–42, 1958–59, 1959–60, 1960–61, 1961–62, 1963–64, 1966–67, 1967–68, 1968–69, 1973–74, 1983–84, 1984–85, 1985–86

- Campeonatos da 2ª Categoria

- Winners (3): 1934–35, 1940–41, 1945–46

- Campeonatos da 3ª Categoria

- Winners (2): 1923–24, 1930–31

- Campeonatos da 4ª Categoria

- Winners (2): 1911–12, 1912–13

- Taça Mutilados de Guerra

- Winners (1): 1917–18 (Provisional)

- Taça Lisboa

- Winners (1): 1930–31

=== European competitions ===
- European Cup Winners' Cup

- Winners (1): 1963–64

- Intertoto Cup

- Winners (1): 1968

- Iberian Cup

- Winners (1): 2000

- Torneio Triangular de Caracas

- Winners (1): 1981

- UEFA Cup

- Runners-up (1): 2004–05

- Latin Cup

- Runners-up (1): 1949

=== Friendly competitions ===
- Teresa Herrera Trophy

- Winners (1): 1961

- Iberian Trophy (Badajoz, Spain)

- Winners (2): 1967, 1970
- Runners-up (1): 2005

- Trofeo Internacional Montilla-Moriles (Córdoba, Spain)

- Winners (1): 1969

- Tournament of Bulgaria

- Winners (1): 1981

- Tournament City San Sebastián

- Winners (1): 1991

- Trofeo Ciudad de Vigo

- Winners (1): 2001
- Runners-up (1): 1977

- Guadiana Trophy

- Winners (3): 2005, 2006, 2008

- Colombino Trophy

- Winners (1): 2006

- Trofeo Santiago Bernabéu

- Runners-up (1): 2008

- Fenway Football Challenge

- Runners-up (1): 2010

- Barclays New York Challenge

- Winners (1): 2010

== Players ==
Competitive, professional matches only. Players in bold are still active.

=== Appearances ===
- Most appearances: **494** – Hilário
- Most appearances in a season: **56** – João Moutinho (2007–08)

==== Overall appearances ====
Rank	Nationality	Player	Games	Years
1	(Portugal)	Hilário	494	1958–1973
2	(Portugal)	Rui Patrício	467	2006–2018
3	(Portugal)	Damas	456	1966–1976, 1984–1989
4	(Portugal)	Manuel Fernandes	441	1975–1987
5	(Portugal)	Azevedo	421	1935–1952
6	(Portugal)	Oceano	405	1984–1991, 1994–1998
7	(Uruguay)	Sebastián Coates	369	2015–2024
8	(Portugal)	José Carlos	367	1962–1974
9	(Portugal)	Manecas	366	1935–1951
10	(Portugal)	Mourão	348	1928–1944
10	(Portugal)	Vasques	348	1946–1959
Last update: 11 January 2018

=== Goalscorers ===
- Most goals scored: **544** – Fernando Peyroteo
- Most league goals in a season: **46** – Héctor Yazalde (1973–74)
- Most goals scored in a match: **9** – Fernando Peyroteo

==== Overall scorers ====
Rank	Nationality	Player	Games	Goals	Years
1	(Portugal)	Peyroteo	334	544	1937–1949
2	(Portugal)	Manuel Fernandes	441	260	1975–1987
3	(Portugal)	Vasques	348	227	1946–1959
4	(Portugal)	Soeiro	219	204	1933–1945
5	(Portugal)	Jordão	286	186	1977–1986
6	(Portugal)	Mourão	335	176	1928–1944
7	(Brazil) (Portugal)	Liédson	313	172	2003–2011
8	(Portugal)	João Martins	248	163	1947–1959
9	(Portugal)	Albano	336	160	1943–1956
10	(Portugal)	Jesus Correia	208	159	1943–1953
Last update: 13 August 2018

==== Overall scorers (foreign players) ====
Rank	Nationality	Player	Games	Goals	Years
1	(Brazil) (Portugal)	Liédson	313	172	2003–2011
2	(Argentina)	Yazalde	135	128	1971–1975
3	(Sweden)	**Viktor Gyökeres**	114	108	2023–2025
4	(Bulgaria)	Yordanov	226	71	1991–2001
5	(Netherlands)	Bas Dost	85	69	2016–2019
6	(Brazil)	Jardel	62	67	2001–2003
7	(Algeria)	Islam Slimani	116	61	2013–2017 2022–2023
8	(Bulgaria)	Balakov	169	60	1991–1995
Last update: 21 April 2025

== Team records ==
=== Matches ===
- First European match: Sporting 3 – 3 Partizan de Belgrado, Estádio Nacional, Jamor, 1955

=== Record wins ===
- Record League win: Sporting 14–0 Leça, 1941–42
- Record Portuguese Cup win: Sporting 21–0 Mindelense, 1/8 Finals, 1970–71
- Record League Cup win: Sporting 6–0 União da Madeira, group stage, 2017–18
- Record European win: Sporting 16–1 APOEL, 1963–64 (European Record)
- Record Portuguese Supercup win: Sporting 6–1 Braga, away leg, 1981–82

== League, cup and Europe history ==
=== Recent seasons ===
Season	Division	Pos	Pld	W	D	L	GF	GA	Pts	Cup	League Cup	Competition	Result	Competition	Result	Player(s)	Goals
Season	League									Cup	League Cup	European competitions		Other competitions		Top scorer(s) (Note: Only goals scored in the regional championship or Primeira Liga are considered.)	
2014–15	Primeira Liga	3rd	34	22	10	2	67	29	76	W	R3 (GS2)	Champions League Europa League	GS R32	—	—	Islam Slimani	12
2015–16	Primeira Liga	2nd	34	27	5	2	79	21	86	R16	R3 (GS)	Champions League Europa League	PO R32	Supertaça	W	Islam Slimani	27
2016–17	Primeira Liga	3rd	34	21	7	6	68	36	70	QF	R3 (GS)	Champions League	GS	—	—	Bas Dost	34
2017–18	Primeira Liga	3rd	34	24	6	4	63	24	78	RU	W	Champions League Europa League	GS QF	—	—	Bas Dost	27
2018–19	Primeira Liga	3rd	34	23	5	6	72	33	74	W	W	Europa League	R32	—	—	Bruno Fernandes	20
2019–20	Primeira Liga	4th	34	18	6	10	49	34	60	R64	SF	Europa League	R32	Supertaça	RU	Bruno Fernandes (Note: Left the club halfway through the season.)	8
2020–21	Primeira Liga	1st	34	26	7	1	65	20	85	R16	W	Europa League	PO	—	—	Pedro Gonçalves	23
2021–22	Primeira Liga	2nd	34	27	4	3	73	23	85	SF	W	Champions League	R16	Supertaça	W	Pablo Sarabia	15
2022–23	Primeira Liga	4th	34	23	5	6	71	32	74	R64	RU	Champions League Europa League	GS QF	—	—	Pedro Gonçalves	15
2023–24	Primeira Liga	1st	34	29	3	2	96	29	90	RU	SF	Europa League	R16	—	—	Viktor Gyökeres	29
2024–25	Primeira Liga	1st	34	25	7	2	88	27	82	W	RU	Champions League	KPO	Supertaça	RU	Viktor Gyökeres	39
