= List of players who have appeared in multiple UEFA European Championships =

In the UEFA European Championship, the following male football players have been named in the national team in at least four finals tournaments.

== Most tournaments ==
Team	Player (Note: Name in bold indicates a player still active at international level.)	In squad (Note: Number of finals tournaments in which the player was part of the squad.)	Played (Note: Number of finals tournaments in which the player played in at least one match.)	Tournaments (Note: Years in brackets indicate that the player was part of the squad but did not play in any matches.)
Portugal	Cristiano Ronaldo	6	6	2004, 2008, 2012, 2016, 2020, 2024
Croatia	**Luka Modrić**	5	5	2008, 2012, 2016, 2020, 2024
Portugal	Pepe	5	5	2008, 2012, 2016, 2020, 2024
Spain	Iker Casillas	5	3	(2000), 2004, 2008, 2012, (2016)
Portugal	Rui Patrício	5	3	(2008), 2012, 2016, 2020, (2024)
Italy	Gianluigi Buffon	4	4	2004, 2008, 2012, 2016
Czech Republic	Petr Čech	4	4	2004, 2008, 2012, 2016
Italy	Giorgio Chiellini	4	4	2008, 2012, 2016, 2020
Italy	Alessandro Del Piero	4	4	1996, 2000, 2004, 2008
France	Olivier Giroud	4	4	2012, 2016, 2020, 2024
Sweden	Zlatan Ibrahimović	4	4	2004, 2008, 2012, 2016
Sweden	Andreas Isaksson	4	4	2004, 2008, 2012, 2016
Sweden	Kim Källström	4	4	2004, 2008, 2012, 2016
Germany	Toni Kroos	4	4	2012, 2016, 2020, 2024
Sweden	Sebastian Larsson	4	4	2008, 2012, 2016, 2020
Poland	**Robert Lewandowski**	4	4	2012, 2016, 2020, 2024
Germany	Lothar Matthäus	4	4	1980, 1984, 1988, 2000
Sweden	Olof Mellberg	4	4	2000, 2004, 2008, 2012
Portugal	João Moutinho	4	4	2008, 2012, 2016, 2020
Germany	Thomas Müller	4	4	2012, 2016, 2020, 2024
Germany	Manuel Neuer	4	4	2012, 2016, 2020, 2024
Croatia	**Ivan Perišić**	4	4	2012, 2016, 2020, 2024
Czech Republic	Jaroslav Plašil	4	4	2004, 2008, 2012, 2016
Germany	Lukas Podolski	4	4	2004, 2008, 2012, 2016
Czech Republic	Tomáš Rosický	4	4	2000, 2004, 2012, 2016
Netherlands	Edwin van der Sar	4	4	1996, 2000, 2004, 2008
Denmark	Peter Schmeichel	4	4	1988, 1992, 1996, 2000
Germany	Bastian Schweinsteiger	4	4	2004, 2008, 2012, 2016
Croatia	Darijo Srna	4	4	2004, 2008, 2012, 2016
Poland	Wojciech Szczęsny	4	4	2012, 2016, 2020, 2024
France	Lilian Thuram	4	4	1996, 2000, 2004, 2008
Ukraine	**Andriy Yarmolenko**	4	4	2012, 2016, 2020, 2024
Netherlands	Aron Winter	4	3	(1988), 1992, 1996, 2000
Croatia	Domagoj Vida	4	3	2012, 2016, 2020, (2024)
Russia	Igor Akinfeev	4	2	(2004), 2008, (2012), 2016
Sweden	Andreas Granqvist	4	2	(2008), 2012, 2016, (2020)
France	Steve Mandanda	4	0	(2008), (2012), (2016), (2020)

== Most matches ==
The following players have played at least fifteen matches, which requires appearances in a minimum of three European Championship tournaments.

Team	Player (Note: Name in bold indicates a player still active in international football.)	Matches (Note: Number of finals matches the player entered the field, not counting those as an unused substitute.)	Tournaments
Portugal	Cristiano Ronaldo	30	2004, 2008, 2012, 2016, 2020, 2024
Portugal	Pepe	23	2008, 2012, 2016, 2020, 2024
Germany	Manuel Neuer	20	2012, 2016, 2020, 2024
Germany	Toni Kroos	19	2012, 2016, 2020, 2024
Portugal	João Moutinho	19	2008, 2012, 2016, 2020
Italy	Leonardo Bonucci	18	2012, 2016, 2020
England	**Harry Kane**	18	2016, 2020, 2024
Germany	Bastian Schweinsteiger	18	2004, 2008, 2012, 2016
Italy	Gianluigi Buffon	17	2004, 2008, 2012, 2016
Italy	Giorgio Chiellini	17	2008, 2012, 2016, 2020
France	Antoine Griezmann	17	2016, 2020, 2024
Spain	**Álvaro Morata**	17	2016, 2020, 2024
Germany	Thomas Müller	17	2012, 2016, 2020, 2024
Spain	Jordi Alba	16	2012, 2016, 2020
Spain	Cesc Fàbregas	16	2008, 2012, 2016
Spain	Andrés Iniesta	16	2008, 2012, 2016
Croatia	**Luka Modrić**	16	2008, 2012, 2016, 2020, 2024
Portugal	Rui Patrício	16	2012, 2016, 2020
Netherlands	Edwin van der Sar	16	1996, 2000, 2004, 2008
France	Lilian Thuram	16	1996, 2000, 2004, 2008
England	Kyle Walker	16	2016, 2020, 2024
France	Olivier Giroud	15	2012, 2016, 2020, 2024
France	Hugo Lloris	15	2012, 2016, 2020
Portugal	Nani	15	2008, 2012, 2016
Spain	Sergio Ramos	15	2008, 2012, 2016
Spain	David Silva	15	2008, 2012, 2016

== See also ==
- UEFA European Championship
- UEFA European Championship top goalscorers
- List of UEFA European Championship winning players
