= Portugal national football team records and statistics =

The following is a list of the Portugal national football team's competitive records and statistics.

== Individual records ==
=== Player records ===
==== Most capped players ====
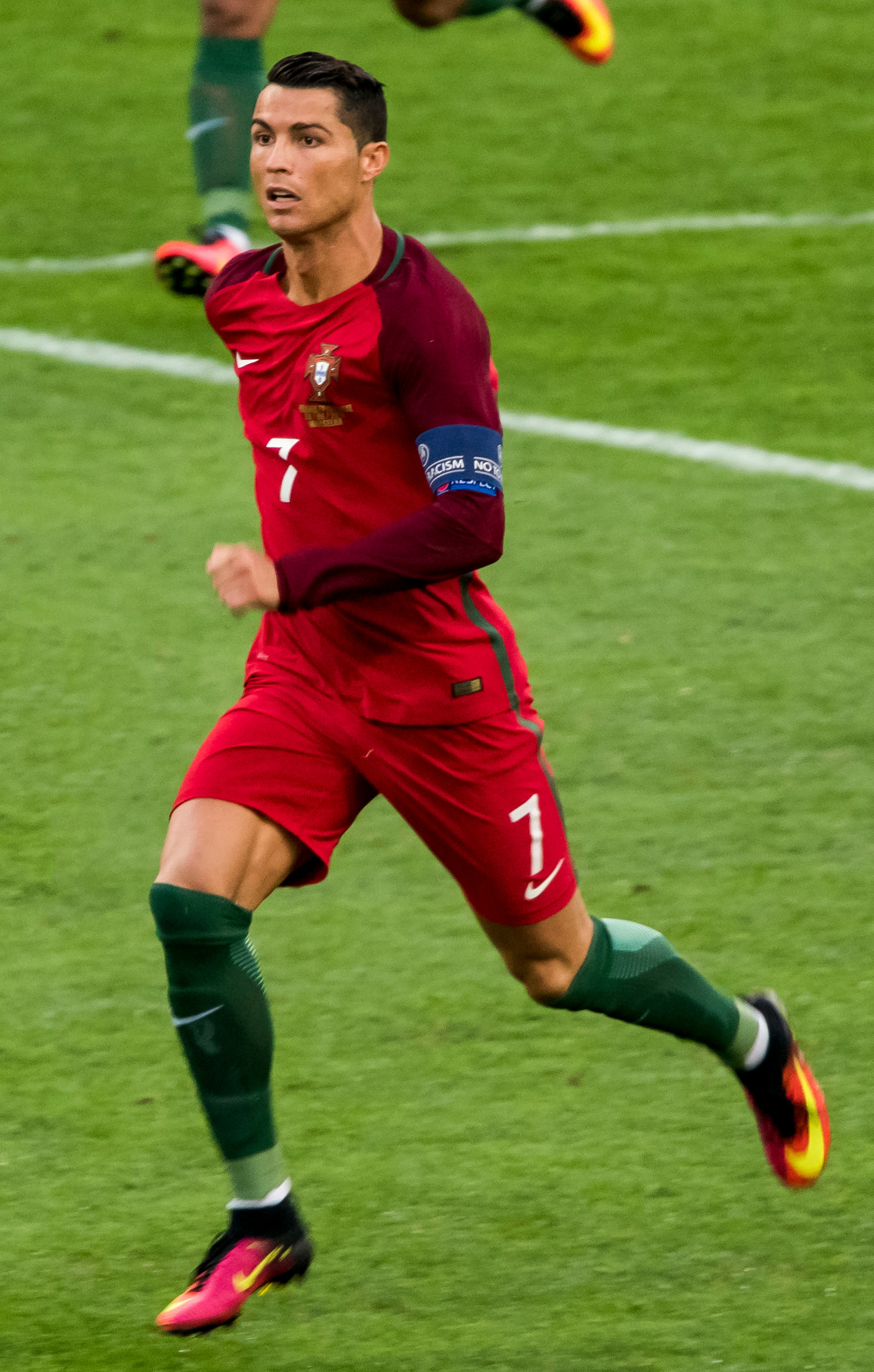
Cristiano Ronaldo is Portugal's record appearance maker and all-time top scorer.

As of match played 24 September 2026
Players in bold are still active with Portugal.

Rank	Player	Caps	Goals	First cap	Latest cap
1	Cristiano Ronaldo	234	146	20 August 2003	24 September 2026
2	João Moutinho	146	7	17 August 2005	9 June 2022
3	Pepe	141	8	21 November 2007	5 July 2024
4	Luís Figo	127	32	12 October 1991	8 July 2006
5	**Bernardo Silva**	114	14	21 March 2015	27 September 2026
6	Nani	112	24	1 September 2006	2 July 2017
7	Fernando Couto	110	8	19 December 1990	30 June 2004
8	Rui Patrício	108	0	17 November 2010	21 March 2024
9	Bruno Alves	96	11	5 June 2007	7 June 2018
10	**Bruno Fernandes**	95	29	10 November 2017	24 September 2026

==== Top goalscorers ====
As of match played 24 September 2026
Players in bold are still active for the national team.

Rank	Player	Goals	Caps	Average	First cap	Latest cap
1	Cristiano Ronaldo (list)	146	234	0.62	20 August 2003	24 September 2026
2	Pauleta (list)	47	88	0.53	20 August 1997	8 July 2006
3	Eusébio (list)	41	64	0.64	8 October 1961	13 October 1973
4	Luís Figo	32	127	0.25	12 October 1991	8 July 2006
5	Nuno Gomes	29	79	0.37	24 January 1996	11 October 2011
5	**Bruno Fernandes**	29	95	0.31	10 November 2017	24 September 2026
7	Hélder Postiga	27	71	0.38	13 June 2003	14 November 2014
8	Rui Costa	26	94	0.28	31 March 1993	4 July 2004
9	Nani	24	112	0.21	1 September 2006	2 July 2017
10	João Pinto	23	81	0.28	12 October 1991	14 June 2002

=== Other records ===
Most matches played in World Cup
27 – Cristiano Ronaldo (2006, 2010, 2014, 2018, 2022 and 2026)
Most matches played in European Championship
30 – Cristiano Ronaldo (2004, 2008, 2012, 2016, 2020 and 2024)
Oldest player (outfield and goalkeeper)
41 years, 152 days – Cristiano Ronaldo (0–1 against Spain on 6 July 2026)
Longest national career
23 years, 35 days – Cristiano Ronaldo (from 20 August 2003 to 24 September 2026)
Youngest debutant
17 years, 6 months and 24 days – Paulo Futre (5–0 against Finland on 21 September 1983)
Youngest player to reach 100 caps
27 years, 8 months and 11 days – Cristiano Ronaldo (1–1 against Northern Ireland on 16 October 2012)

=== Goal records ===
Most goals scored in World Cups
11 – Cristiano Ronaldo (2006, 2010, 2014, 2018, 2022 and 2026)
Most goals scored in one World Cup
9 – Eusébio (1966)
Most goals scored in one European Championship
5 – Cristiano Ronaldo (2020)
Most goals scored in European Championships
14 – Cristiano Ronaldo (2004, 2008, 2012, 2016 and 2020)
Oldest goalscorer
41 years, 147 days – Cristiano Ronaldo (2–1 against Croatia on 2 July 2026)
Youngest goalscorer
17 years, 299 days – Fernando Chalana (2–1 against Cyprus on 5 December 1976)
Most hat-tricks
10 – Cristiano Ronaldo (includes four goals against Andorra on 7 October 2016 and Lithuania on 10 September 2019)
Most pokers
2 – Cristiano Ronaldo
Youngest player to score a hat-trick
20 years, 339 days – André Silva (6–0 against Faroe Islands on 10 October 2016)

== Competition records ==
Champions Runners-up Third place Fourth place

=== FIFA World Cup ===
FIFA World Cup record									FIFA World Cup qualification record						
Year	Round	Position	Pld	W	D*	L	GF	GA	Position	Pld	W	D	L	GF	GA
(Uruguay) 1930	Did not enter								Declined participation						
(Kingdom of Italy) 1934	Did not qualify								2nd	2	0	0	2	1	11
(French Third Republic) 1938	Did not qualify								2nd	1	0	0	1	1	2
(Fourth Brazilian Republic) 1950	Did not qualify								2nd	2	0	1	1	3	7
(Switzerland) 1954	Did not qualify								2nd	2	0	1	1	1	9
(Sweden) 1958	Did not qualify								3rd	4	1	1	2	4	7
(Chile) 1962	Did not qualify								2nd	4	1	1	2	9	7
(England) 1966	Third place	3rd	6	5	0	1	17	8	1st	6	4	1	1	9	4
(Mexico) 1970	Did not qualify								4th	6	1	2	3	8	10
(West Germany) 1974	Did not qualify								2nd	6	2	3	1	10	6
(Argentina) 1978	Did not qualify								2nd	6	4	1	1	12	6
(Spain) 1982	Did not qualify								4th	8	3	1	4	8	11
(Mexico) 1986	Group stage	17th	3	1	0	2	2	4	2nd	8	5	0	3	12	10
(Italy) 1990	Did not qualify								3rd	8	4	2	2	11	8
(United States) 1994	Did not qualify								3rd	10	6	2	2	18	5
(France) 1998	Did not qualify								3rd	10	5	4	1	12	4
(South Korea) (Japan) 2002	Group stage	21st	3	1	0	2	6	4	1st	10	7	3	0	33	7
(Germany) 2006	Fourth place	4th	7	4	1*	2	7	5	1st	12	9	3	0	35	5
(South Africa) 2010	Round of 16	11th	4	1	2	1	7	1	P/O	12	7	4	1	19	5
(Brazil) 2014	Group stage	18th	3	1	1	1	4	7	P/O	12	8	3	1	24	11
(Russia) 2018	Round of 16	13th	4	1	2	1	6	6	1st	10	9	0	1	32	4
(Qatar) 2022	Quarter-finals	8th	5	3	0	2	12	6	P/O	10	7	2	1	22	7
(Canada) (Mexico) (United States) 2026	Round of 16	TBD	5	2	2	1	8	3	1st	6	4	1	1	20	7
Total	Third place	9/23	40	19	8	13	69	44	Total	155	87	36	32	304	153

FIFA World Cup history
First match	Portugal 3–1 Hungary (13 July 1966; Manchester, England)
Biggest win	Portugal 7–0 North Korea (21 June 2010; Cape Town, South Africa)
Biggest defeat	Germany 4–0 Portugal (16 June 2014; Salvador, Brazil)
Best result	Third place in 1966
Worst result	Group stage in 1986, 2002, 2014

*Draws include knockout matches decided via penalty shoot-out.

=== UEFA European Championship ===
UEFA European Championship record									Qualification record					
Year	Round	Position	Pld	W	D*	L	GF	GA	Pld	W	D	L	GF	GA
(France) 1960	Did not qualify								4	3	0	1	8	8
(Spain) 1964	Did not qualify								3	1	0	2	4	5
(Italy) 1968	Did not qualify								6	2	2	2	6	6
(Belgium) 1972	Did not qualify								6	3	1	2	10	6
(Socialist Federal Republic of Yugoslavia) 1976	Did not qualify								6	2	3	1	5	7
(Italy) 1980	Did not qualify								8	4	1	3	10	11
(France) 1984	Semi-finals	3rd	4	1	2	1	4	4	6	5	0	1	11	6
(West Germany) 1988	Did not qualify								8	2	4	2	6	8
(Sweden) 1992	Did not qualify								8	5	1	2	11	4
(England) 1996	Quarter-finals	5th	4	2	1	1	5	2	10	7	2	1	29	7
(Belgium) (Netherlands) 2000	Semi-finals	3rd	5	4	0	1	10	4	10	7	2	1	32	4
(Portugal) 2004	Runners-up	2nd	6	3	1*	2	8	6	Qualified as hosts					
(Austria) (Switzerland) 2008	Quarter-finals	7th	4	2	0	2	7	6	14	7	6	1	24	10
(Poland) (Ukraine) 2012	Semi-finals	3rd (Note: Though there was no third place play-off, UEFA decided in the 2012 edition to award the semi-final losers (Germany and Portugal) bronze medals for the first time.)	5	3	1*	1	6	4	10	6	2	2	27	14
(France) 2016	Champions	1st	7	3	4*	0	9	5	8	7	0	1	11	5
(Europe) 2020	Round of 16	13th	4	1	1	2	7	7	8	5	2	1	22	6
(Germany) 2024	Quarter-finals	8th	5	2	2*	1	5	3	10	10	0	0	36	2
(United Kingdom) (Republic of Ireland) 2028	To be determined								To be determined					
(Italy) (Turkey) 2032	To be determined								To be determined					
Total	1 Title	9/17	44	21	12	11	61	41	125	76	26	23	252	109

UEFA European Championship history
First match	Portugal 0–0 West Germany (14 June 1984; Strasbourg, France)
Biggest win	Croatia 0–3 Portugal (19 June 1996; Nottingham, England) Portugal 3–0 Germany (20 June 2000; Rotterdam, Netherlands); Hungary 0–3 Portugal (15 June 2021; Budapest, Hungary); Turkey 0–3 Portugal (22 June 2024; Dortmund, Germany)
Biggest defeat	Switzerland 2–0 Portugal (15 June 2008; Basel, Switzerland) Portugal 2–4 Germany (19 June 2021; Munich, Germany); Georgia 2–0 Portugal (26 June 2024; Gelsenkirchen, Germany)
Best result	Champions in 2016
Worst result	Round of 16 in 2020

*Draws include knockout matches decided via penalty shoot-out. Red border colour indicates that the tournament was held on home soil.

=== UEFA Nations League ===
UEFA Nations League record
Season**	Division	Group	Pld	W	D*	L	GF	GA	P/R	Rank
(Portugal) 2018–19	A	3	6	4	2	0	9	4	Same position	1st
(Italy) 2020–21	A	3	6	4	1	1	12	4	Same position	5th
(Netherlands) 2022–23	A	2	6	3	1	2	11	3	Same position	6th
(Germany) 2024–25	A	1	10	6	3	1	22	11	Same position	1st
2026–27	A	4	2	2	0	0	3	1	Same position	1st
Total			30	19	7	4	57	23	2 titles	

UEFA Nations League history
First match	Portugal 1–0 Italy (10 September 2018; Lisbon, Portugal)
Biggest win	Portugal 4–0 Switzerland (6 June 2022; Lisbon, Portugal); Portugal 5–1 Poland (15 November 2024; Porto, Portugal)
Biggest defeat	Portugal 0–1 France (14 November 2020; Lisbon, Portugal); Switzerland 1–0 Portugal (13 June 2022; Bern, Switzerland); Portugal 0–1 Spain (27 September 2022; Braga, Portugal); Denmark 1–0 Portugal (20 March 2025; Copenhagen, Denmark)
Best result	Champions in 2018–19 and 2024–25
Worst result	6th in 2022–23

*Draws include knockout matches decided via penalty shoot-out.
**Group stage played home and away. Flag shown represents host nation for the finals stage. Red border colour indicates the finals stage was held on home soil.

=== FIFA Confederations Cup ===
FIFA Confederations Cup record
Year	Round	Position	Pld	W	D*	L	GF	GA
(Saudi Arabia) 1992	Did not qualify							
(Saudi Arabia) 1995	Did not qualify							
(Saudi Arabia) 1997	Did not qualify							
(Mexico) 1999	Did not qualify							
(South Korea) (Japan) 2001	Did not qualify							
(France) 2003	Did not qualify							
(Germany) 2005	Did not qualify							
(South Africa) 2009	Did not qualify							
(Brazil) 2013	Did not qualify							
(Russia) 2017	Third place	3rd	5	3	2*	0	9	3
Total	Third place	1/10	5	3	2	0	9	3

FIFA Confederations Cup history
First match	Portugal 2–2 Mexico (18 June 2017; Kazan, Russia)
Biggest win	New Zealand 0–4 Portugal (24 June 2017; Saint Petersburg, Russia)
Biggest defeat	—
Best result	Third place in 2017
Worst result	Third place in 2017

*Draws include knockout matches decided via penalty shoot-out.

=== Olympic Games ===
1968–1988 national amateur football team. Football at the Summer Olympics has been an under-23 tournament since 1992.

Olympic Games record
Year	Round	Pld	W	D*	L	GF	GA
(Greece) 1896	No football tournament						
(France) 1900	Did not enter						
(United States) 1904	Did not enter						
(United Kingdom) 1908	Did not enter						
(Sweden) 1912	Did not enter						
(Belgium) 1920	Did not enter						
(France) 1924	Did not enter						
(Netherlands) 1928	Quarter-finals	3	2	0	1	7	5
(United States) 1932	No football tournament						
(Germany) 1936	Did not enter						
(United Kingdom) 1948	Did not enter						
(Finland) 1952	Did not enter						
(Australia) 1956	Did not enter						
(Italy) 1960	Did not enter						
(Japan) 1964	Did not enter						
(Mexico) 1968	Did not enter						
(West Germany) 1972	Did not enter						
(Canada) 1976	Did not enter						
(Soviet Union) 1980	Did not enter						
(United States) 1984	Did not qualify						
(South Korea) 1988	Did not qualify						
(Spain) 1992	Did not qualify						
(United States) 1996	Fourth place	6	2	2	2	6	10
(Australia) 2000	Did not qualify						
(Greece) 2004	Group stage	3	1	0	2	6	9
(China) 2008	Did not qualify						
(United Kingdom) 2012	Did not qualify						
(Brazil) 2016	Quarter-finals	4	2	1	1	5	6
(Japan) 2020	Did not qualify						
(France) 2024	Did not qualify						
Total	Fourth place	16	7	3	6	24	30

*Draws include knockout matches decided via penalty shoot-out.

=== Minor tournaments ===
Year	Round	Position	Pld	W	D*	L	GF	GA
(Brazil) 1964 Taça de Nações	Third place, round-robin	3rd	3	0	1	2	2	7
1972 Brazil Independence Cup	Runners-up	2nd	8	6	1	1	17	5
(United States) 1992 U.S. Cup	Round-robin	4th	3	0	1	2	0	3
(Canada) 1995 SkyDome Cup	Winners, round-robin	1st	2	1	1	0	2	1
Total		1 title	16	7	4	5	21	16

*Draws include knockout matches decided via penalty shoot-out.

=== All-time results ===
The following table shows Portugal's all-time international record, correct as of 27 September 2026.

	Played	Won	Drawn	Lost	GF	GA
Total	710	356	162	192	1245	792

Source: Portugal - Historical results

== Head-to-head record ==
Portugal have played against teams from every confederation. Their first international match was played on 18 December 1921 in Madrid against Spain, losing 3–1. The team they have faced the most often is also Spain, with a total of 42 matches played. Their biggest win was by a nine-goal margin, in a 9–0 Euro qualifying victory against Luxembourg on 11 September 2023.

Key
Positive balance (more Wins)
Neutral balance (Wins = Losses)
Negative balance (more Losses)

As of match played against Norway on 4 October 2026.

Team	Pld	W	D	L	GF	GA	GD
Albania	7	5	1	1	13	5	+8
Algeria	1	1	0	0	3	0	+3
Andorra	6	6	0	0	29	1	+28
Angola	3	3	0	0	12	1	+11
Argentina	8	2	1	5	7	13	−6
Armenia	8	6	2	0	23	5	+18
Austria	11	2	6	3	11	19	−8
Azerbaijan	8	7	1	0	22	1	+21
Belgium	19	6	7	6	21	23	−2
Bolivia	1	1	0	0	4	0	+4
Bosnia and Herzegovina	6	5	1	0	16	2	+14
Brazil	20	4	3	13	16	39	−23
Bulgaria	13	4	3	6	16	18	−2
Cameroon	2	2	0	0	8	2	+6
Canada	2	1	1	0	5	2	+3
Cape Verde	3	1	1	1	4	3	+1
Chile	5	3	2	0	11	5	+6
China	2	2	0	0	4	0	+4
Colombia	1	0	1	0	0	0	0
Croatia	11	8	2	1	21	9	+12
Cyprus	11	10	1	0	35	6	+29
Czech Republic	6	5	0	1	12	3	+9
Denmark	19	13	2	4	41	23	+18
DR Congo	1	0	1	0	1	1	0
Ecuador	2	1	0	1	5	3	+2
Egypt	4	3	0	1	9	3	+6
England	23	3	10	10	25	46	−21
Estonia	8	7	1	0	25	1	+24
Faroe Islands	3	3	0	0	16	1	+15
Finland	11	6	4	1	18	8	+10
France	29	6	4	19	31	53	−22
Gabon	1	0	1	0	2	2	0
Georgia	2	1	0	1	2	2	0
Germany	20	4	5	11	20	34	−14
Ghana	2	2	0	0	5	3	+1
Gibraltar	1	1	0	0	5	0	+5
Greece	14	4	5	5	16	18	−2
Hungary	16	11	5	0	38	14	+24
Iceland	5	4	1	0	12	5	+7
Iran	3	2	1	0	6	1	+5
Israel	7	4	2	1	16	9	+7
Italy	28	6	4	18	23	51	−28
Ivory Coast	1	0	1	0	0	0	0
Kazakhstan	3	3	0	0	6	1	+5
Kuwait	2	1	1	0	9	1	+8
Latvia	6	6	0	0	18	4	+14
Liechtenstein	9	8	1	0	41	3	+38
Lithuania	4	4	0	0	20	3	+17
Luxembourg	21	19	1	1	74	8	+66
Macedonia	3	2	1	0	3	0	+3
Malta	10	9	1	0	28	5	+23
Mexico	6	3	3	0	7	4	+3
Moldova	1	1	0	0	3	0	+3
Morocco	3	1	0	2	2	4	-2
Mozambique	2	2	0	0	5	1	+4
Netherlands	14	8	4	2	16	10	+6
New Zealand	1	1	0	0	4	0	+4
Nigeria	2	2	0	0	6	1	+5
North Korea	2	2	0	0	12	3	+9
Northern Ireland	13	4	7	2	14	13	+1
Norway	13	10	2	1	22	7	+15
Panama	1	1	0	0	2	0	+2
Paraguay	1	0	1	0	0	0	0
Poland	15	7	5	3	26	15	+11
Qatar	2	2	0	0	6	1	+5
Republic of Ireland	18	10	3	5	26	13	+13
Romania	11	5	2	4	11	9	+2
Russia	7	4	1	2	11	3	+8
Saudi Arabia	2	2	0	0	6	0	+6
Scotland	17	9	4	4	23	15	+8
Serbia	9	3	4	2	14	11	+3
Slovakia	6	5	1	0	10	3	+7
Slovenia	2	0	1	1	0	2	−2
South Africa	2	2	0	0	5	1	+4
South Korea	2	0	0	2	1	3	−2
Spain	42	6	18	18	47	80	−33
Sweden	21	8	6	7	30	31	−1
Switzerland	26	10	5	11	40	35	+5
Tunisia	2	0	2	0	3	3	0
Turkey	10	8	0	2	22	9	+13
Ukraine	4	1	1	2	3	4	−1
United States	8	3	3	2	10	8	+2
Uruguay	4	2	1	1	7	3	+4
Uzbekistan	1	1	0	0	5	0	+5
Wales	5	4	0	1	10	4	+6
Former teams
Czechoslovakia	9	3	3	3	7	10	−3
East Germany	3	2	0	1	6	5	+1
Soviet Union	4	3	0	1	4	6	−2
Yugoslavia	5	3	0	2	10	12	−2
