= Michael Bella =

German footballer

Personal information
- Date of birth: 29 September 1945 (age 81)
- Place of birth: Duisburg, Germany
- Height: 1.72 m (5 ft 8 in)
- Position: Defender

Youth career
- 1953–1957: DJK Lösort-Meiderich
- 1957–1964: MSV Duisburg

Senior career*
Years	Team	Apps	(Gls)
1964–1978	MSV Duisburg	405	(13)
Total		405	(13)

International career
1968–1971	West Germany	4	(0)
Medal record
Representing West Germany
UEFA European Championship
Winner	1972 Belgium
- * Club domestic league appearances and goals

Michael Bella (born 29 September 1945) is a German former professional footballer who played as a defender.

== Career ==
Bella was born in Duisburg. Between 1964 and 1978, he played for MSV Duisburg in the Bundesliga, playing 405 games, a record for the club. He scored 13 goals in this time. He also stood with Duisburg in the German Cup finals of 1966 and 1975, however both finals were lost. Between 1968 and 1971, Bella played four times in the West Germany national team. He was an unused member of the title-winning DFB squad for Euro 72.
