= Rui Patrício =

Portuguese footballer (born 1988)

Rui Patrício ComM
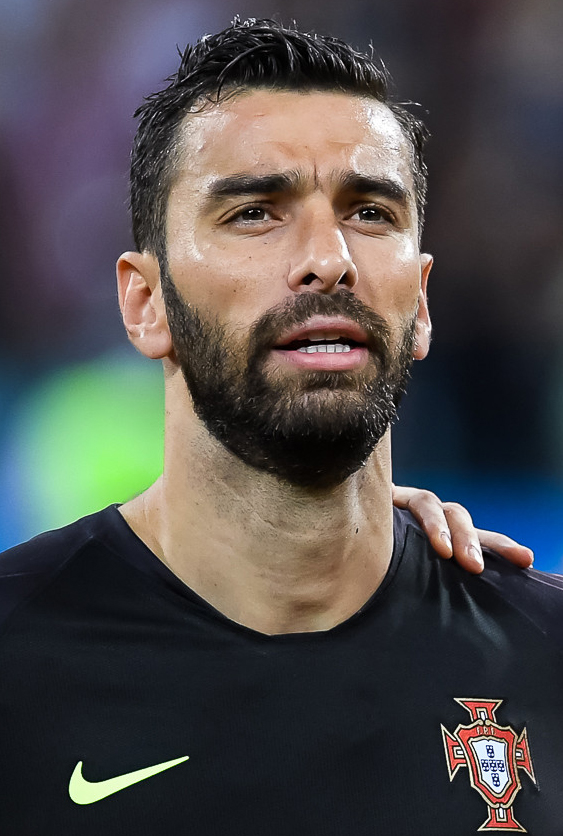
- Patrício with Portugal at the 2018 FIFA World Cup

Personal information
- Full name: Rui Pedro dos Santos Patrício
- Date of birth: 15 February 1988 (age 38)
- Place of birth: Marrazes, Portugal
- Height: 1.90 m (6 ft 3 in)
- Position: Goalkeeper

Youth career
- 1997–2000: Leiria e Marrazes
- 2000–2006: Sporting CP

Senior career*
Years	Team	Apps	(Gls)
2006–2018	Sporting CP	327	(0)
2018–2021	Wolverhampton Wanderers	112	(0)
2021–2024	Roma	96	(0)
2024–2025	Atalanta	3	(0)
2025	Al Ain	0	(0)
Total		538	(0)

International career
2003–2004	Portugal U16	5	(0)
2004–2005	Portugal U17	11	(0)
2005–2006	Portugal U18	4	(0)
2006–2007	Portugal U19	10	(0)
2007–2008	Portugal U20	8	(0)
2007–2010	Portugal U21	14	(0)
2010–2024	Portugal	108	(0)
Medal record
Men's football
Representing Portugal
UEFA European Championship
Winner	2016 France
Bronze medal – third place	2012 Poland–Ukraine	(Note: Though there was no third place playoff, UEFA decided in the 2012 edition to award the semi-final losers (Germany and Portugal) bronze medals for the first time: "Regulations for UEFA Euro 2012")
UEFA Nations League
Winner	2019 Portugal
FIFA Confederations Cup
Third place	2017 Russia
UEFA European U17 Championship
Third place	2004 France
- * Club domestic league appearances and goals

Rui Pedro dos Santos Patrício ComM (Portuguese pronunciation: [ˈʁuj pɐˈtɾisju]; born 15 February 1988) is a Portuguese former professional footballer who played as a goalkeeper.

A product of Sporting CP's youth academy, Patrício made his first team debut at the age of 18, and went on to appear in 467 official games. He won five trophies during his twelve years with the club, including two Portuguese Cups, before moving to England to join Wolverhampton Wanderers in 2018. In 2021, he signed for Roma, where he won the Europa Conference League in his first season.

Patrício earned his first cap for the Portugal national team in 2010, after Paulo Bento's appointment as head coach, and his 100th in 2021. He represented the nation in three World Cups and five European Championships, winning the 2016 edition of the latter tournament as well as the 2019 Nations League.

Patrício announced his retirement from professional football on 11 December 2025, concluding a 19-year senior career.

== Club career ==
=== Sporting CP ===
Born in the village of Marrazes in Leiria, Patrício played as a striker at a young age. Reportedly, a Sporting CP scout was in the area and saw him play in goal, being impressed enough to sign the 12-year-old to the club's youth academy. He made his Primeira Liga debut on 19 November 2006, in a 1–0 away win against Marítimo in the tenth round: standing in for habitual club and country first-choice Ricardo, he saved a penalty kick 15 minutes before the end of the game.

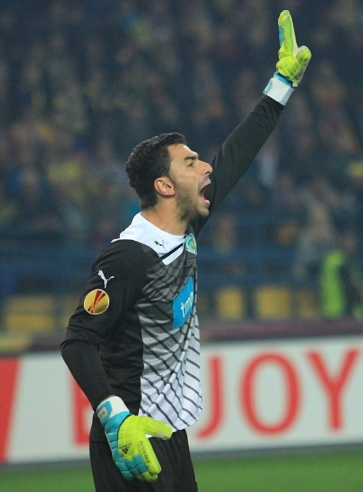
Patrício with Sporting in 2012

In the 2007–08 season, after Ricardo's departure to Real Betis, Patrício beat competition from Sporting veteran Tiago and new signing Vladimir Stojković to become the undisputed starter. He made his UEFA Champions League debut on 27 November 2007, in a 1–2 group stage loss at Manchester United.

During the 2008 off-season, Patrício was the subject of a rumoured transfer to Italian giants Inter Milan. Nothing came of it, however, and in that year's Supertaça Cândido de Oliveira, against Porto, he stopped a Lucho González penalty in a 2–0 final success, also being an everpresent fixture in the league.

In the qualifying rounds of the 2009–10 Champions League, at Twente, Sporting were trailing 0–1 in the 94th minute, after a 0–0 tie in the first leg: Patrício rushed to the opposing area for a corner kick, where he went up for a header with Nikita Rukavytsya. Both players seemed to make contact with the ball, and it was helped into the net for an own goal via the boot of Peter Wisgerhof as the latter side qualified for the last games prior to the group stage.

On 20 December 2012, Patrício was awarded Sporting's Footballer of the Year award for a second consecutive year. On 18 October 2014, with the score at 2–1 for his team, he saved a penalty by Jackson Martínez to help oust Porto from the Taça de Portugal with a 3–1 win at the Estádio do Dragão.

Patrício was one of 30 players nominated for the 2016 Ballon d'Or award alongside Portugal teammates Pepe and Cristiano Ronaldo. On 18 February the following year he appeared in his 400th competitive game with Sporting, putting on a Player of the match performance in a 1–0 home win against Rio Ave.

On 15 May 2018, Patrício and several of his teammates, including coaches, were injured following an attack by around 50 supporters of Sporting at the club's training ground after the team finished third in the league and missed out on Champions League qualification. Despite the events, he and the rest of the team agreed to play in the Portuguese Cup final scheduled for the following weekend, eventually losing 2–1 to Aves.

Patrício's record of 467 official games was the second-highest in Sporting's history, behind only Hilário da Conceição.

=== Wolverhampton Wanderers ===
On 1 June 2018, Patrício submitted a request to terminate his Sporting contract with grounds for just cause, due to the dressing room violence from supporters as well as seeing an €18 million move to newly promoted Premier League team Wolverhampton Wanderers fall through, after Sporting president Bruno de Carvalho pulled out of negotiations at the last minute. He completed the move on 18 June, on a four-year deal, and it was announced on 31 October that both clubs had agreed a €18 million deal as settlement of his departure to England.

Patrício opted to wear the No.11 shirt for Wolves as opposed to the habitual No.1, in honour of Carl Ikeme, who had just retired following treatment for acute leukaemia. He made his league debut on 11 August 2018, in a 2–2 home draw against Everton. He kept nine clean sheets – a club record – as they finished his first season in seventh place and qualified for the Europa League.

In 2019–20, Patrício increased his number of clean sheets to 14, and conceded 40 goals compared to 46 the season before. On the European front, he helped the team to a first continental quarter-final since 1972. On 19 February 2021, he played his 100th Premier League match in a 1–0 win over Leeds United.

=== Roma ===
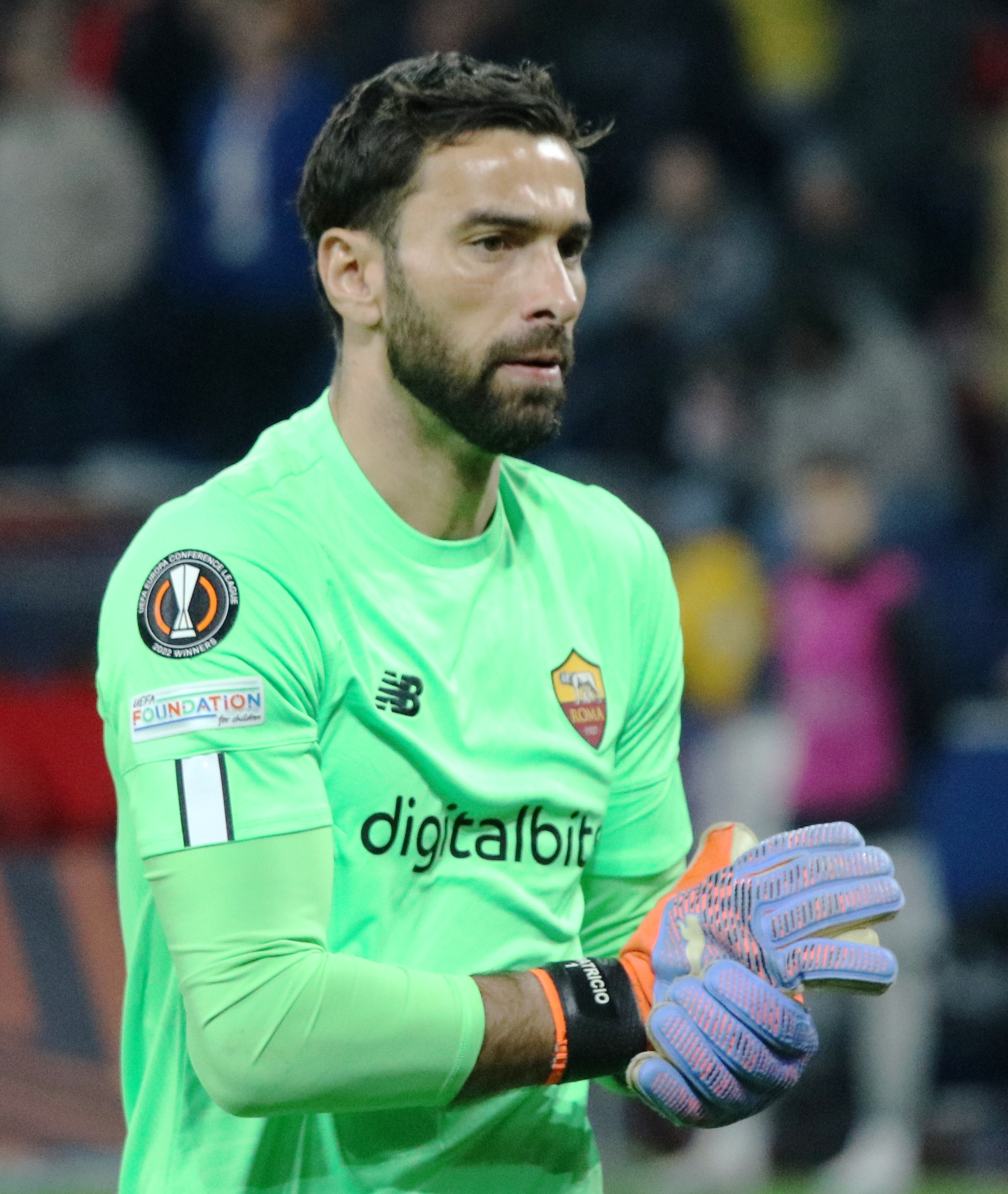
Patrício in 2023 with Roma

On 14 July 2021, Patrício joined Italian side Roma, signing a three-year deal. He made his debut on 19 August in the first game under compatriot José Mourinho, a 2–1 win away to Trabzonspor in the first leg of the UEFA Europa Conference League play-offs. Three days later he made his first Serie A appearance, a 3–1 victory at home to Fiorentina; he was one of seven players to feature in every game of the season, while only Empoli counterpart Guglielmo Vicario matched him for playing every minute. He played all bar one of the fifteen fixtures as the team won the inaugural Conference League, including the 1–0 final win over Feyenoord in Tirana.

Patrício departed Roma on 30 June 2024, after his contract expired.

=== Atalanta ===
On 27 August 2024, Patrício joined fellow Italian club Atalanta as a free agent on a one-year deal.

=== Al Ain ===
In late May 2025, Patrício signed a short-term deal with UAE Pro League side Al Ain ahead of their participation in the 2025 FIFA Club World Cup.

=== Retirement ===
On 10 December 2025, Patrício announced his retirement from professional football.

== International career ==
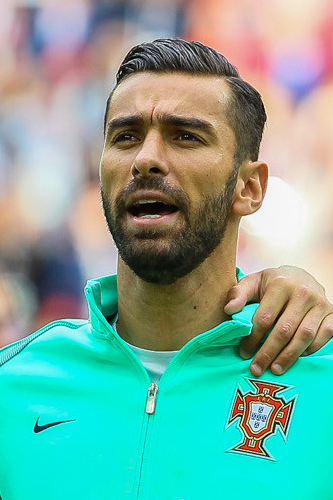
Patrício with Portugal at the 2017 Confederations Cup

From 2007, Patrício started appearing for the Portuguese under-21 side. On 29 January of the following year, senior team coach Luiz Felipe Scolari called him up for a 1–3 friendly defeat against Italy in Zürich, although he did not leave the bench; on 12 May he was picked to the squad for UEFA Euro 2008, but did not play in the tournament.

Although not part of the provisional 24-player list for the 2010 FIFA World Cup in South Africa, Patrício was named in a backup list of six players. He made his debut on 17 November 2010, playing the second half of a 4–0 friendly win against Spain.

After Eduardo was relegated to the bench at his new club, Benfica, Patrício became the starter under national team boss Paulo Bento, and both players finished the Euro 2012 qualifying campaign with five games (450 minutes) as Portugal qualified for the final stages. He was the starter in the finals in Poland and Ukraine, conceding four goals in five matches in an eventual semi-final exit.

Patrício was included in Bento's 23-man squad for the 2014 FIFA World Cup as first-choice, and made his debut in the competition in the first encounter against Germany, which ended with a 0–4 loss. He missed the second game against the United States, due to injury.

Patrício appeared in his 50th international on 30 June 2016, during Euro 2016: after the 1–1 draw to Poland at the Stade Vélodrome during the first 120 minutes, he saved Jakub Błaszczykowski's attempt in a 5–3 penalty shootout win that qualified his team to the semi-finals. Having won the tournament with a solid display in the final, he also made the squad for the 2018 FIFA World Cup in Russia. On 17 November that year, he captained the side for the first time in a goalless draw with Italy in the UEFA Nations League.

As Portugal defeated the Netherlands in the 2019 UEFA Nations League Final on home soil at the Estádio do Dragão, Patrício earned his 81st cap, thereby surpassing Vítor Baía as the nation's most capped goalkeeper. After keeping his place at the delayed UEFA Euro 2020 in 2021, he reached 100 caps on 12 October that year in a 5–0 World Cup qualifying win over Luxembourg, becoming the seventh Portuguese player and the first goalkeeper from his country to reach the landmark.

In March 2022, Patrício did not play in the World Cup playoffs, being replaced by Porto's Diogo Costa. At the finals in Qatar, the latter played all five matches in a run to the quarter-finals.

== Personal life ==
Patrício married Joana Pereira in June 2011, after a seven-year relationship. He filed for divorce on 24 December of the same year, aged 23. As of 2019, he is married to television sexologist Vera Ribeiro, with whom he has a son and a daughter.

== Career statistics ==
=== Club ===
Appearances and goals by club, season and competition
Club	Season	League			National cup (Note: Includes Taça de Portugal, Coppa Italia)		League cup (Note: Includes Taça da Liga)		Europe		Other		Total	
Club	Season	Division	Apps	Goals	Apps	Goals	Apps	Goals	Apps	Goals	Apps	Goals	Apps	Goals
Sporting CP	2006–07	Primeira Liga	1	0	0	0	—		0	0	—		1	0
Sporting CP	2007–08	Primeira Liga	20	0	5	0	3	0	8 (Note: Two appearances in UEFA Champions League, six appearances in UEFA Cup)	0	0	0	36	0
Sporting CP	2008–09	Primeira Liga	26	0	1	0	0	0	6 (Note: Appearance(s) in UEFA Champions League)	0	1 (Note: Appearance in Supertaça Cândido de Oliveira)	0	34	0
Sporting CP	2009–10	Primeira Liga	30	0	3	0	4	0	14 (Note: Four appearances in UEFA Champions League, ten appearances in UEFA Europa League)	0	—		51	0
Sporting CP	2010–11	Primeira Liga	30	0	2	0	3	0	8 (Note: Appearances in UEFA Europa League)	0	—		43	0
Sporting CP	2011–12	Primeira Liga	28	0	6	0	0	0	13	0	—		47	0
Sporting CP	2012–13	Primeira Liga	30	0	1	0	1	0	7	0	—		39	0
Sporting CP	2013–14	Primeira Liga	30	0	1	0	0	0	—		—		31	0
Sporting CP	2014–15	Primeira Liga	33	0	4	0	0	0	8 (Note: Six appearances in UEFA Champions League, two appearances in UEFA Europa League)	0	—		45	0
Sporting CP	2015–16	Primeira Liga	34	0	2	0	0	0	9	0	1	0	46	0
Sporting CP	2016–17	Primeira Liga	31	0	1	0	0	0	6	0	—		38	0
Sporting CP	2017–18	Primeira Liga	34	0	5	0	3	0	14 (Note: Eight appearances in UEFA Champions League, six appearances in UEFA Europa League)	0	—		56	0
Sporting CP	Total		327	0	31	0	14	0	93	0	2	0	467	0
Wolverhampton Wanderers	2018–19	Premier League	37	0	0	0	0	0	—		—		37	0
Wolverhampton Wanderers	2019–20	Premier League	38	0	0	0	0	0	15	0	—		53	0
Wolverhampton Wanderers	2020–21	Premier League	37	0	0	0	0	0	—		—		37	0
Wolverhampton Wanderers	Total		112	0	0	0	0	0	15	0	—		127	0
Roma	2021–22	Serie A	38	0	2	0	—		14 (Note: Appearances in UEFA Europa Conference League)	0	—		54	0
Roma	2022–23	Serie A	35	0	2	0	—		14	0	—		51	0
Roma	2023–24	Serie A	23	0	1	0	—		0	0	—		24	0
Roma	Total		96	0	5	0	—		28	0	—		129	0
Atalanta	2024–25	Serie A	3	0	2	0	—		1	0	—		6	0
Al Ain	2024–25	UAE Pro League	—		—		—		—		2 (Note: Appearances in FIFA Club World Cup)	0	2	0
Career total			538	0	38	0	14	0	137	0	4	0	731	0

=== International ===
Appearances and goals by national team and year
National team	Year	Apps	Goals
Portugal	2010	1	0
Portugal	2011	8	0
Portugal	2012	11	0
Portugal	2013	9	0
Portugal	2014	6	0
Portugal	2015	7	0
Portugal	2016	14	0
Portugal	2017	12	0
Portugal	2018	9	0
Portugal	2019	10	0
Portugal	2020	5	0
Portugal	2021	10	0
Portugal	2022	3	0
Portugal	2023	2	0
Portugal	2024	1	0
Total		108	0

== Honours ==
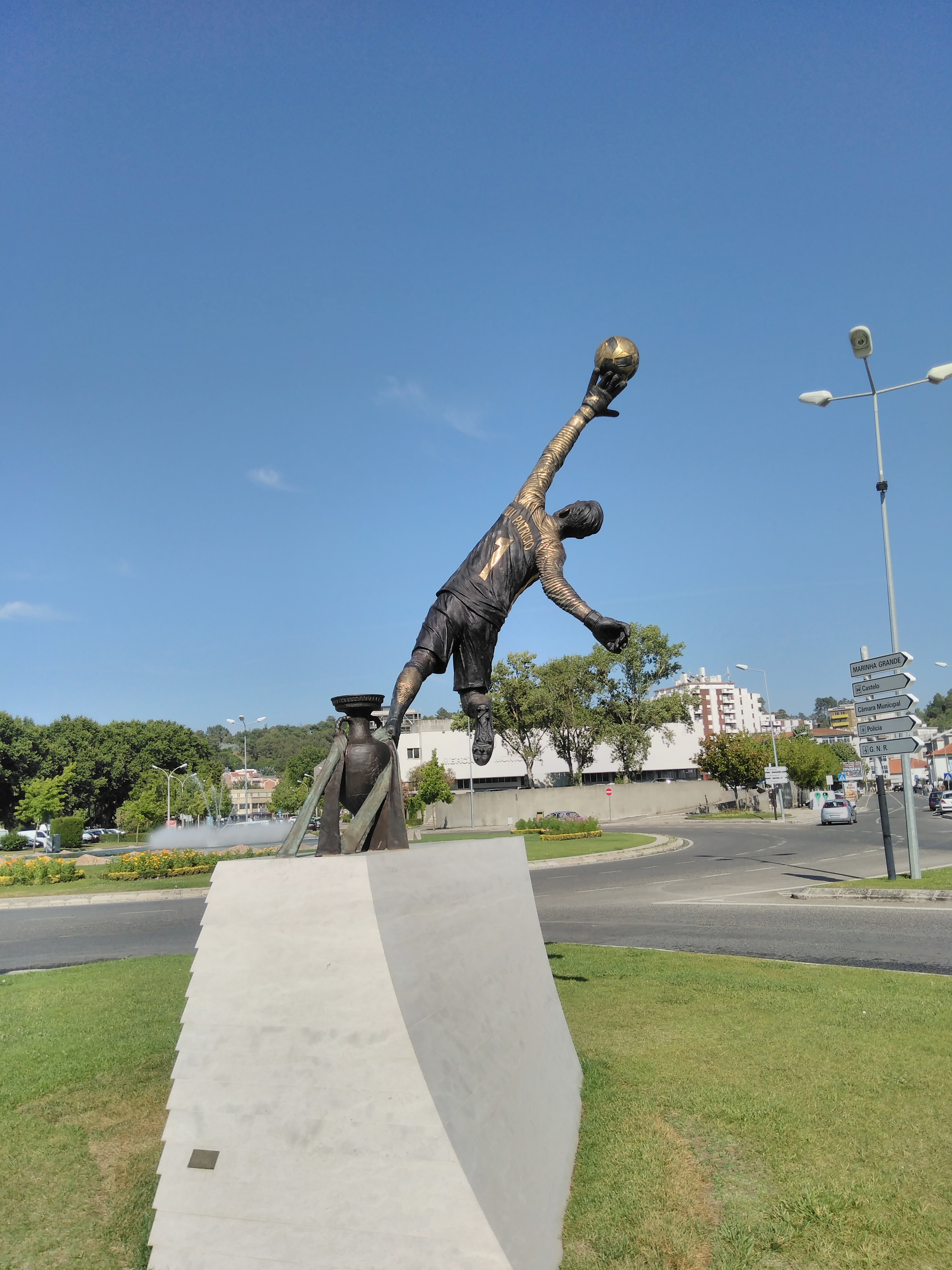
Statue of Patrício and the Henri Delaunay Trophy, unveiled in Leiria in May 2017 to immortalise a save he made from Antoine Griezmann in the Euro 2016 final.

Sporting

- Taça de Portugal: 2006–07, 2007–08, 2014–15
- Taça da Liga: 2017–18
- Supertaça Cândido de Oliveira: 2007, 2008, 2015

Roma

- UEFA Europa Conference League: 2021–22

Portugal U17

- UEFA European Under-17 Championship: 3rd Place 2004

Portugal

- UEFA European Championship: 2016
- UEFA European Championship: 3rd Place 2012
- UEFA Nations League: 2018–19
- FIFA Confederations Cup: 3rd Place 2017

Individual

- SJPF Young Player of the Month: January 2008, April 2009, November 2010, March 2011, April 2011
- SJPF Player of the Month: April 2011
- Sporting CP Footballer of the Year: 2011, 2012
- Primeira Liga Team of the Year: 2016–17, 2017–18
- LPFP Primeira Liga Goalkeeper of the Year: 2011–12, 2015–16, 2017–18
- UEFA European Championship Team of the Tournament: 2016
- O Jogo Primeira Liga Team of the Year: 2013, 2017
- Most clean sheets in Liga Portugal: 2013-2014, 2015-2016, 2017-2018
- SJPF Primeira Liga Team of the Year: 2017
- UEFA Europa League Squad of the Season: 2017–18
- UEFA Europa Conference League Team of the Season: 2021–22

Orders

- Commander of the Order of Merit

Records

- Second-most appearances for Sporting CP in all competitions: 467, behind Hilário Rosário da Conceição, 494
- Most appearances for Sporting CP in the UEFA Champions League: 34 (including 8 in the qualifying rounds)
- Most appearances for Sporting CP in the UEFA Europa League: 59 (including 8 in the qualifying rounds and 6 in the UEFA Cup)
- Most appearances for Sporting CP in UEFA club competitions: 93
- Most appearances by a Portuguese goalkeeper at the UEFA European Championship: 16
- Most goalkeeper appearances for Portugal senior team: 108
