= Dušan Herda =

Slovak footballer

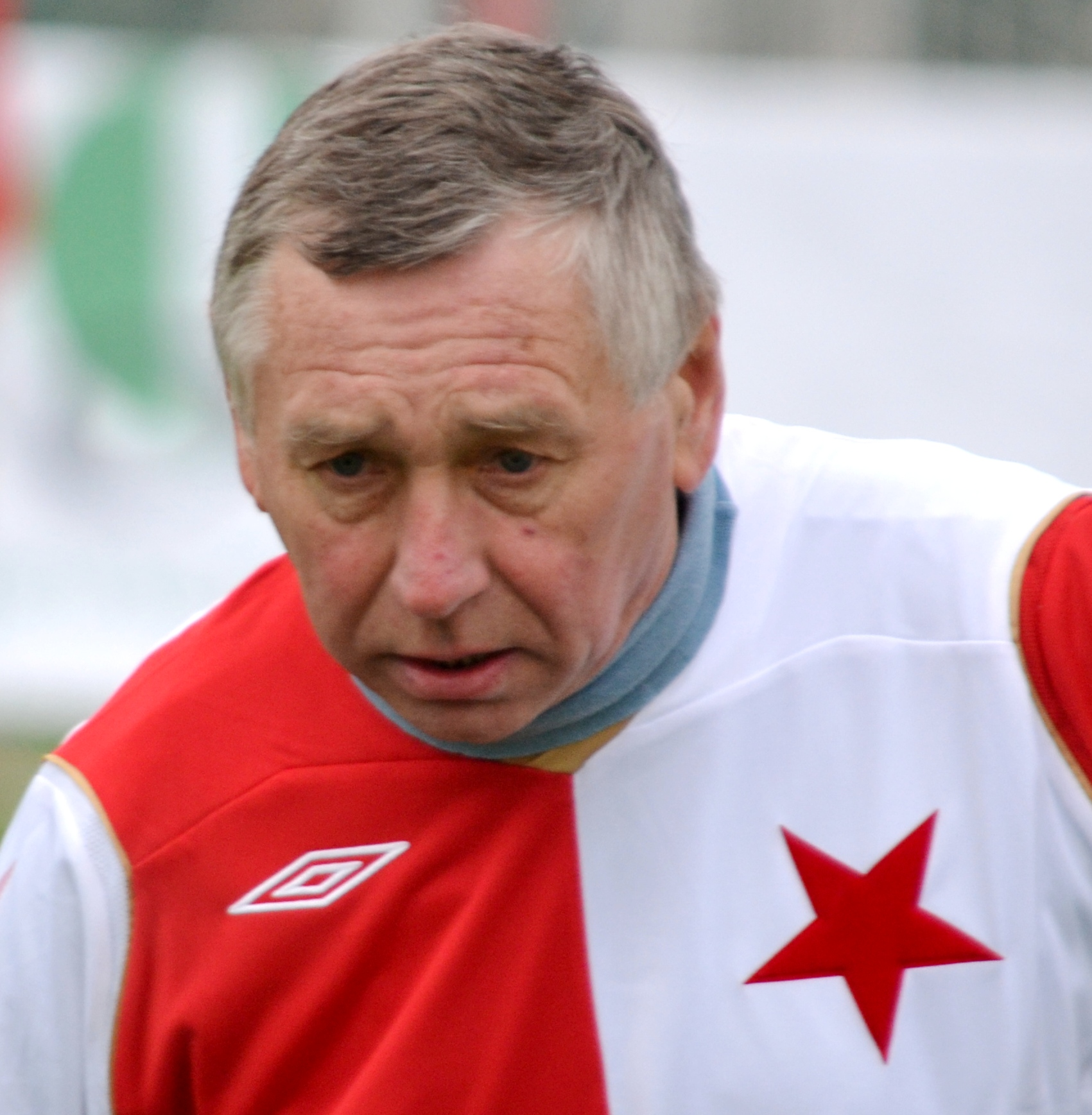

Personal information
- Full name: Dušan Herda
- Date of birth: 15 July 1951 (age 75)
- Place of birth: Jacovce, Czechoslovakia
- Position: Midfielder

International career
Years	Team	Apps	(Gls)
1972	Czechoslovakia	2	(0)
Medal record
Representing Czechoslovakia
UEFA European Championship
Winner	1976 Yugoslavia

Dušan Herda (born 15 July 1951) is a former Slovak football player. At age 11 he started to play in Jacovce and at 17, in 1962, he transferred to Slavia Prague (1969–1980). He also played for Dukla Praha (1980–1982) and Bohemians Praha (1982–1985).

== Career ==
During his club career he played for Slavia Prague. He earned 2 caps for the Czechoslovakia national football team, and was part of the championship-winning team at the 1976 UEFA European Football Championship.
