= Pavol Biroš =

Slovak footballer (1953–2020)

Personal information
- Date of birth: 1 April 1953
- Place of birth: Prešov, Czechoslovakia
- Date of death: 12 August 2020 (aged 67)
- Place of death: Prešov, Slovakia
- Position: Defender

Youth career
- Tatran Prešov
- Slavia Prague

Senior career*
Years	Team	Apps	(Gls)
1972–1979	Slavia Prague	135	(1)
1979–1980	Lokomotíva Košice	40	(0)
1982–1985	Tatran Prešov	37	(0)
Total		212	(1)

International career
1974–1977	Czechoslovakia	9	(0)
Medal record
Representing Czechoslovakia
UEFA European Championship
Winner	1976 Yugoslavia
- * Club domestic league appearances and goals

Pavol Biroš (1 April 1953 – 12 August 2020) was a Slovak football player who played as a defender. He played for the Czechoslovakia national football team.

== Career ==
During his club career he played for Slavia Prague and Tatran Prešov. Biroš made a total of 212 appearances in the Czechoslovak First League, scoring once. He earned 9 caps for the Czechoslovakia national football team, and was part of the championship-winning team at the 1976 UEFA European Football Championship.
